= 2009–10 S.L. Benfica season =

Benfica
2009–10 season
- President: Luís Filipe Vieira
- Manager: Jorge Jesus
- Stadium: Estádio da Luz
- Primeira Liga: 1st
- Taça de Portugal: Fourth round
- Taça da Liga: Winners
- UEFA Europa League: Quarter-finals
- Top goalscorer: League: Óscar Cardozo (26); All: Óscar Cardozo (38)
- Highest home attendance: 64,103 v Rio Ave (9 May 2010)
- Lowest home attendance: 20,000 v Vitória de Guimarães (22 November 2009)
- Average home league attendance: 50,033
- Biggest win: Benfica 8–1 Vitória de Setúbal (31 August 2009)
- Biggest defeat: Liverpool 4–1 Benfica (8 April 2010)
| Home colours | Away colours |

The 2009–10 European football season was the 106th season of Sport Lisboa e Benfica's existence and the club's 76th consecutive season in the top flight of Portuguese football. The season ran from 1 July 2009 to 30 June 2010; Benfica competed domestically in the Primeira Liga, Taça de Portugal and Taça da Liga. The club also participated in the UEFA Europa League after qualifying from the competition's play-off round, which they had to play as a result of finishing third in the previous season.

On 16 June 2009, Jesus replaced Quique Sánchez Flores at the helm of Benfica. Jesus implemented a 4–1–3–2 formation, in which a winger, Ramires, provided cover and assistance to the defensive midfielder, Javi García, and other winger, Ángel Di María, conducted the counterattacks. Pablo Aimar, as an attacking midfielder, distributed play and Javier Saviola created space between lines for Óscar Cardozo, Aimar and Di María.

This fast-paced football proved to be successful and during his first year Jesus led Benfica to the first division title with only 2 loses, also reaching the quarter-finals in the Europa League, losing to Liverpool on a 3–5 aggregate score (this would be the last match Benfica would lose in a run that lasted 27 games).

Benfica won their 32nd Primeira Liga and their second League Cup. They saw the definite breakthroughs of Ángel Di María, David Luiz and Fábio Coentrão, while Óscar Cardozo had his best season yet, scoring 26 league goals. The team's only disappointments of the season were a 4–1 loss to Liverpool at Anfield in the Europa League quarter-finals second leg, where Fernando Torres hit two second-half goals to knock Benfica out of Europe, and an early exit at the Taça de Portugal.

== Season summary ==
After a disappointing season in which Benfica failed to qualify for the Champions League, the club appointed Jorge Jesus as head coach. To strengthen the squad, Benfica signed Javi García and Javier Saviola from Real Madrid, Ramires from Cruzeiro, and César Peixoto from Braga. Fábio Coentrão also returned from loan, while Kostas Katsouranis, Reyes, and David Suazo left the club.

The pre-season began with a 2–2 draw against Sion in Switzerland, followed by victories over Shakhtar Donetsk, Athletic Bilbao, and Olhanense, a defeat to Atlético Madrid, four consecutive wins against Sunderland, Ajax, Portsmouth and Vitória de Guimarães, and a 1–1 draw with Milan in the Eusébio Cup.

The official season opened on 16 August with a 1–1 home draw against Marítimo, followed by a 1–0 away victory over Vitória de Guimarães and an 8–1 home win against Vitória de Setúbal. Later that month, Benfica defeated Vorskla Poltava 5–2 on aggregate in the 2009–10 UEFA Europa League play-off round.

In September Benfica won all four of its matches: 4–0 away at Belenenses, 2–1 away at Leiria, 5–0 at home against Leixões, and 2–0 at home against BATE Borisov in their opening Europa League group stage match. October began with a 1–0 away loss to AEK Athens, but the team responded with victories over Paços de Ferreira, Monsanto in the Taça de Portugal, and a 5–0 home win against Everton in the Europa League. The month ended with a 2–0 away defeat to Braga, leaving Benfica three points behind them in the league table.

Benfica began November with a 2–0 away win over Everton in the Europa League, followed by a league victory against Naval 1º de Maio. The team was then eliminated at home by Vitória de Guimarães in the fourth round of the Taça de Portugal. The month concluded with a 0–0 draw against Sporting at the Estádio José Alvalade. In December, Benfica defeated BATE Borisov and Académica, drew 2–2 away with Olhanense, and won 2–1 against AEK Athens before hosting Porto. In a tightly contested match, a 23rd-minute goal from Javier Saviola secured a 1–0 victory, allowing Benfica to end the year level on points with Braga.

The new year began with a 1–0 win over Nacional in the Taça da Liga, followed by league victories against Rio Ave away, Marítimo away, and Vitória de Guimarães at home. A draw against Guimarães and a win over Rio Ave in the Taça da Liga ensured Benfica advanced to the semi-finals, finishing January as joint league leaders.

In February, Benfica recorded league wins over Leiria, Belenenses and Leixões, drew away to Vitória de Setúbal, eliminated Sporting with a 4–1 away victory in the Taça da Liga semi-finals, and defeated Hertha BSC 5–1 on aggregate in the Europa League round of 32. March began with league wins over Paços de Ferreira and Nacional, followed by three decisive fixtures. Benfica eliminated Marseille 3–2 on aggregate in the Europa League round of 16, after a 1–1 home draw and a 2–1 away win secured in extra time. The team then defeated Porto 3–0 in the Taça da Liga final at the Estádio Algarve, before hosting Braga in a decisive league match at the Estádio da Luz, which Benfica won 1–0. The month ended with Benfica advancing in the Europa League, winning the Taça da Liga, and extending their lead at the top of the league to six points.

April began with a UEFA Europa League quarter-final tie against Liverpool, where Benfica won the first leg 2–1 at home but lost 4–1 at Anfield, resulting in elimination from the competition. The team then secured league victories over Naval 1º de Maio, Sporting, Académica and Olhanense, moving closer to the league title. On 2 May, Benfica visited Estádio do Dragão to face Porto, knowing that a win would secure the championship. However, the match ended in a 3–1 defeat, delaying their celebrations. One week later, Benfica clinched their 32nd league title with a victory over Rio Ave.

== Competitions ==
Win Draw Loss Postponed

=== Pre-season friendlies ===
| 12 July 2009 Friendly | Sion | 2–2 | Benfica | Sion, Switzerland |
| 17:30 CET (UTC+01) | Die 65'; Dabo 77' | | Cardozo 25'; Saviola 35' (pen.) | Stadium: Stade Tourbillon; Attendance: 12,450 |

| 13 July 2009 Friendly | Benfica | 2–0 | Shakhtar Donetsk | Geneva, Switzerland |
| 18:30 CET (UTC+01) | Cardozo 8'; Martins 25' | | | Stadium: Charmilles Stadium |

| 16 July 2009 Guadiana Trophy | Benfica | 2–1 | Athletic Bilbao | Vila Real de Santo António, Portugal |
| 21:15 CET (UTC+01) | Saviola 48', 66' | | Toquero 17' | Stadium: Complexo Desportivo de Vila Real de Santo; Attendance: 3,568; Referee: Eugénio Ârez |

| 18 July 2009 Guadiana Trophy | Benfica | 2–1 | Olhanense | Vila Real de Santo António, Portugal |
| 21:15 CET (UTC+01) | Cardozo 64'; Vítor 90' | | Ukra 62' (pen.) | Stadium: Complexo Desportivo de Vila Real de Santo |

| 21 July 2009 Friendly | Benfica | 1–2 | Atlético Madrid | Lisbon, Portugal |
| 19:00 CET (UTC+01) | Cardozo 20' | | García 11'; Forlán 45' (pen.) | Stadium: Estádio da Luz; Attendance: 57,462 |

| 24 July 2009 Amsterdam Tournament | Sunderland | 0–2 | Benfica | Amsterdam, Netherlands |
| 18:00 CET (UTC+01) | | | Cardozo 32' (pen.); Pereira 55' | Stadium: Amsterdam Arena; Referee: Reinold Wiedemeijer |

| 26 July 2009 Amsterdam Tournament | Ajax | 2–3 | Benfica | Amsterdam, Netherlands |
| 20:15 CET (UTC+01) | Donald 44'; Rommedahl 77' | | Aissati 8' (o.g.); Di María 31'; David Luiz 55' | Stadium: Amsterdam ArenA; Referee: Pieter Vink |

| 1 August 2009 Guimarães Trophy | Benfica | 4–0 | Portsmouth | Guimarães, Portugal |
| 21:15 CET (UTC+01) | Cardozo 15', 38'; Weldon 69'; Wilkinson 85' (o.g.) | | | Stadium: Estádio D. Afonso Henriques |

| 2 August 2009 Guimarães Trophy | Vitória de Guimarães | 0–2 | Benfica | Guimarães, Portugal |
| 21:15 CET (UTC+01) | | | Weldon 39'; Amorim 65' | Stadium: Estádio D. Afonso Henriques; Referee: Jorge Sousa |

| 8 August 2009 Eusébio Cup | Benfica | 1–1 (5–4 p) | Milan | Lisbon, Portugal |
| 19:00 CET (UTC+01) | Cardozo 58' | | Sidnei 87' (o.g.) | Stadium: Estádio da Luz; Attendance: 62,342; Referee: João Ferreira |
| | Penalties |
| | Keirrison (penalty scored); Shaffer (penalty scored); Coentrão (penalty missed); Amorim (penalty scored); Weldon (penalty missed); Yebda (penalty scored); Patric (penalty missed); Sidnei (penalty scored) | | Pirlo (penalty scored); Ronaldinho (penalty missed); Jankulovski (penalty scored); Silva (penalty missed); Borriello (penalty scored); Pato (penalty scored); Zambrotta (penalty missed); Antonini (penalty missed) |

=== Regular season friendlies ===
| 3 September 2009 CNE Cup | Benfica | 3–1 | Celtic | Toronto, Canada |
| 00:30 CET (UTC+01) | Keirrison 3'; Pinto 58'; Saviola 72' | Report | McGowan 45+1' | Stadium: BMO Field; Referee: Silviu Petresco |

| 13 November 2009 Pedro Pauleta Trophy | Santa Clara | 1–1 (3–5 p) | Benfica | Azores, Portugal |
| 22:15 CET (UTC+01) | Leandro Tatu 51' | | Keirrison 35' | Stadium: Estádio de São Miguel; Referee: Jacinto Paixão |
| | Penalties |
| | Netto (penalty scored); Lico (penalty scored); Danilo Silva (penalty missed); Renan (penalty scored) | | Menezes (penalty scored); Ribeiro (penalty scored); Sidnei (penalty scored); Shaffer (penalty scored); Jean (penalty scored) |

| 20 May 2010 Friendly | New England Revolution | 0–4 | Benfica | Foxborough, United States |
| 01:00 CET (UTC+01) | | | Menezes 15'; Sidnei 17'; Peixoto 32'; Kardec 53' | Stadium: Gillette Stadium; Attendance: 12,735; Referee: Hilario Grajeda |

| 23 May 2010 Friendly | Benfica | 0–0 | Panathinaikos | Toronto, Canada |
| 20:15 CET (UTC+01) | David Luiz (red card) | | | Stadium: BMO Field; Attendance: 8,000 |

=== Primeira Liga ===
==== League table ====
| Pos | Team | Pld | W | D | L | GF | GA | GD | Pts | Qualification or relegation |
|---|---|---|---|---|---|---|---|---|---|---|
| 1 | Benfica (C) | 30 | 24 | 4 | 2 | 78 | 20 | +58 | 76 | Qualification to Champions League group stage |
| 2 | Braga | 30 | 22 | 5 | 3 | 48 | 20 | +28 | 71 | Qualification to Champions League third qualifying round |
| 3 | Porto | 30 | 21 | 5 | 4 | 70 | 26 | +44 | 68 | Qualification to Europa League play-off round (Note: Porto qualified for the play-off round of 2010–11 UEFA Europa League after winning the 2009–10 Taça de Portugal.) |
| 4 | Sporting CP | 30 | 13 | 9 | 8 | 42 | 26 | +16 | 48 | Qualification to Europa League third qualifying round |
| 5 | Marítimo | 30 | 11 | 8 | 11 | 42 | 43 | −1 | 41 (Note: Marítimo ahead of Vitória de Guimarães on head-to-head record; Vitória de Guimarães–Marítimo 1–2, Marítimo–Vitória de Guimarães 0–1.) | Qualification to Europa League second qualifying round |

Source: LPFP
Rules for classification: 1) points; 2) head-to-head points; 3) head-to-head goal difference; 4) head-to-head goals scored; 5) goal difference; 6) number of goals scored.
(C) Champions

==== Results by round ====
| Round | 1 | 2 | 3 | 4 | 5 | 6 | 7 | 8 | 9 | 10 | 11 | 12 | 13 | 14 | 15 | 16 | 17 | 18 | 19 | 20 | 21 | 22 | 23 | 24 | 25 | 26 | 27 | 28 | 29 | 30 |
|---|---|---|---|---|---|---|---|---|---|---|---|---|---|---|---|---|---|---|---|---|---|---|---|---|---|---|---|---|---|---|
| Ground | H | A | H | A | A | H | A | H | A | H | A | H | A | H | A | A | H | A | H | H | A | H | A | H | A | H | A | H | A | H |
| Result | D | W | W | W | W | W | W | W | L | W | D | W | D | W | W | W | W | D | W | W | W | W | W | W | W | W | W | W | L | W |
| Position | 5 | 5 | 2 | 2 | 2 | 2 | 2 | 1 | 2 | 1 | 2 | 1 | 1 | 1 | 1 | 1 | 1 | 2 | 2 | 1 | 1 | 1 | 1 | 1 | 1 | 1 | 1 | 1 | 1 | 1 |

Source: ForaDeJogo.net
A = Away; H = Home; W = Win; D = Draw; L = Loss

==== Matches ====
| 16 August 2009 1 | Benfica | 1–1 | Marítimo | Lisbon |
| 20:15 | Weldon 86' | Report | Alonso 24' (pen.) | Stadium: Estádio da Luz; Attendance: 54,103; Referee: Artur Soares Dias (Porto) |

| 23 August 2009 2 | Vitória Guimarães | 0–1 | Benfica | Guimarães |
| 18:00 | | Report | Ramires 90' | Stadium: Estádio D. Afonso Henriques; Attendance: 27,310; Referee: Pedro Proença (Lisbon) |

| 31 August 2009 3 | Benfica | 8–1 | Vitória de Setúbal | Lisbon |
| 20:15 | García 13'; Luisão 20'; Cardozo 29' (pen.), 65', 75'; Aimar 35'; Ramires 37'; Nuno Gomes 85' | Report | Barbosa 90+2' | Stadium: Estádio da Luz; Attendance: 40,915; Referee: Duarte Gomes (Lisbon) |

| 13 September 2009 4 | Belenenses | 0–4 | Benfica | Lisbon |
| 18:00 | | Report | Saviola 9'; Cardozo 57'; García 76'; Ramires 87' | Stadium: Estádio do Restelo; Attendance: 17,473; Referee: Olegário Benquerença (Leiria) |

| 20 September 2009 5 | União de Leiria | 1–2 | Benfica | Leiria |
| 20:15 | David Luiz 18' (o.g.) | Report | Saviola 4'; Cardozo 78' (pen.) | Stadium: Estádio Dr. Magalhães Pessoa; Attendance: 22,676; Referee: Jorge Sousa (Porto) |

| 26 September 2009 6 | Benfica | 5–0 | Leixões | Lisbon |
| 21:15 | David Luiz 45+3'; Cardozo 55' (pen.), 88'; Ramires 74'; Pereira 81' | Report | | Stadium: Estádio da Luz; Attendance: 43,283; Referee: João Capela (Lisbon) |

| 5 October 2009 7 | Paços de Ferreira | 1–3 | Benfica | Paços de Ferreira |
| 20:15 | Maykon 68' | Report | David Luiz 3'; Martins 21'; Cardozo 40' | Stadium: Estádio da Mata Real; Attendance: 4,865; Referee: João Ferreira (Setúbal) |

| 26 October 2009 8 | Benfica | 6–1 | Nacional | Lisbon |
| 20:15 | Cardozo 16', 48' (pen.), 90+1' (pen.); Saviola 39', 63'; Nuno Gomes 85' | Report | Edgar Costa 26' | Stadium: Estádio da Luz; Attendance: 47,011; Referee: Vasco Santos (Porto) |

| 31 October 2009 9 | Braga | 2–0 | Benfica | Braga |
| 21:15 | Viana 6'; Paulo César 77' | Report | | Stadium: Estádio Municipal de Braga; Attendance: 24,181; Referee: Jorge Sousa (Porto) |

| 9 November 2009 10 | Benfica | 1–0 | Naval | Lisbon |
| 20:15 | García 89' | Report | | Stadium: Estádio da Luz; Attendance: 41,981; Referee: Lucílio Baptista (Lisbon) |

| 28 November 2009 11 | Sporting CP | 0–0 | Benfica | Lisbon |
| 21:15 | | Report | | Stadium: Estádio José Alvalade; Attendance: 45,880; Referee: Pedro Proença (Lisbon) |

| 6 December 2009 12 | Benfica | 4–0 | Académica | Lisbon |
| 20:15 | Cardozo 5', 55', 68'; Saviola 31' | Report | | Stadium: Estádio da Luz; Attendance: 41,206; Referee: Cosme Machado (Braga) |

| 12 December 2009 13 | Olhanense | 2–2 | Benfica | Olhão |
| 21:15 | Fernandes 9'; Toy 32' | Report | Saviola 28'; Nuno Gomes 90+2' | Stadium: Estádio José Arcanjo; Attendance: 8,206; Referee: Artur Soares Dias (Porto) |

| 20 December 2009 14 | Benfica | 1–0 | Porto | Lisbon |
| 20:15 | Saviola 22' | Report | | Stadium: Estádio da Luz; Attendance: 58,659; Referee: Lucílio Baptista (Lisbon) |

| 9 January 2010 15 | Rio Ave | 0–1 | Benfica | Vila do Conde |
| 21:15 | | Report | Saviola 47' | Stadium: Estádio do Rio Ave FC; Attendance: 7,060; Referee: Bruno Paixão (Setúbal) |

| 17 January 2010 16 | Marítimo | 0–5 | Benfica | Funchal |
| 20:15 | | Report | Saviola 28'; Pereira 34'; Cardozo 49' (pen.); Roberto 50' (o.g.); Luisão 69' | Stadium: Estádio dos Barreiros; Attendance: 5,000; Referee: João Ferreira (Setúbal) |

| 30 January 2010 17 | Benfica | 3–1 | Vitória de Guimarães | Lisbon |
| 19:15 | Aimar 16'; Martins 50', 59' | Report | Assis 31' | Stadium: Estádio da Luz; Attendance: 52,616; Referee: Elmano Santos (Madeira) (Madeira) |

| 6 February 2010 18 | Vitória Setúbal | 1–1 | Benfica | Setúbal |
| 21:15 | David Luiz 37' (o.g.) | Report | Silva 14' (o.g.) | Stadium: Estádio do Bonfim; Attendance: 9,640; Referee: Jorge Sousa (Porto) |

| 13 February 2010 19 | Benfica | 1–0 | Belenenses | Lisbon |
| 17:00 | Cardozo 10' | Report | | Stadium: Estádio da Luz; Attendance: 45,329; Referee: Carlos Xistra (Castelo Branco) |

| 3 February 2010 20 | Benfica | 3–0 | União de Leiria | Lisbon |
| 21:00 | Cardozo 9'; Saviola 60'; Amorim 89' | Report | | Stadium: Estádio da Luz; Attendance: 33,179; Referee: Marco Ferreira (Madeira) |

| 27 February 2010 21 | Leixões | 0–4 | Benfica | Leixões |
| 21:15 | | Report | Éder Luís 26'; Di María 69', 76', 86' | Stadium: Estádio do Mar; Attendance: 6,474; Referee: Lucílio Baptista (Lisbon) |

| 7 March 2010 22 | Benfica | 3–1 | Paços de Ferreira | Lisbon |
| 20:15 | Amorim 13'; Saviola 17'; Cardozo 58' | Report | William 43' | Stadium: Estádio da Luz; Attendance: 42,971; Referee: Artur Soares Dias (Porto) |

| 14 March 2010 23 | Nacional | 0–1 | Benfica | Funchal |
| 18:00 | | Report | Cardozo 58' | Stadium: Estádio da Madeira; Attendance: 4,646; Referee: Paulo Baptista (Portalegre) |

| 27 March 2010 24 | Benfica | 1–0 | Braga | Lisbon |
| 20:15 | Luisão 45+1' | Report | | Stadium: Estádio da Luz; Attendance: 63,679; Referee: Pedro Proença (Lisbon) |

| 5 April 2010 25 | Naval | 2–4 | Benfica | Figueira da Foz |
| 21:00 | Fábio Junior 2'; Bolívia 11' | Report | Weldon 15', 18'; Di María 37'; Cardozo 55' | Stadium: Estádio Municipal José Bento Pessoa; Attendance: 7,491; Referee: Elmano Santos (Madeira) (Madeira) |

| 13 April 2010 26 | Benfica | 2–0 | Sporting CP | Lisbon |
| 20:45 | Cardozo 62'; Aimar 77' | Report | | Stadium: Estádio da Luz; Attendance: 59,317; Referee: João Ferreira (Setúbal) |

| 18 April 2010 27 | Académica | 2–3 | Benfica | Coimbra |
| 18:00 | Gomes 28'; Tiero 88' | Report | Weldon 2', 41'; Amorim 81' | Stadium: Estádio Cidade de Coimbra; Attendance: 21,742; Referee: Carlos Xistra (Castelo Branco) |

| 24 April 2010 28 | Benfica | 5–0 | Olhanense | Lisbon |
| 21:15 | Cardozo 3' (pen.), 54', 56'; Di María 18'; Aimar 78' | Report | | Stadium: Estádio da Luz; Attendance: 62,147; Referee: Lucílio Baptista (Lisbon) |

| 2 May 2010 29 | Porto | 3–1 | Benfica | Porto |
| 20:15 | Alves 42'; Farías 59'; Belluschi 82' | Report | Luisão 56' | Stadium: Estádio do Dragão; Attendance: 44,902; Referee: Olegário Benquerença (Leiria) |

| 9 May 2010 30 | Benfica | 2–1 | Rio Ave | Lisbon |
| 18:00 | Cardozo 3', 79' | Report | Chaves 72' | Stadium: Estádio da Luz; Attendance: 64,103; Referee: Jorge Sousa (Porto) |

=== Taça de Portugal ===
| 18 October 2009 Third round | GDR Monsanto | 0–6 | Benfica | Torres Novas |
| 18:15 CET | | | Menezes 29'; Martins 47', 59'; Saviola 84'; Peixoto 89'; Coentrão 90+1' | Stadium: Estádio Municipal Dr. Alves Vieira; Attendance: 10,000; Referee: Paulo Costa (Porto) |

| 22 November 2009 Fourth round | Benfica | 0–1 | Vitória de Guimarães | Lisbon |
| 19:45 CET | | | Gustavo Lazzaretti 25' | Stadium: Estádio da Luz; Attendance: 20,000; Referee: Elmano Santos (Madeira) |

=== Taça da Liga ===
==== Group stage ====
| 3 January 2010 1 | Benfica | 1–0 | Nacional | Lisbon |
| 19:15 | Saviola 78' | Report | | Stadium: Estádio da Luz; Attendance: 17,684; Referee: Olegário Benquerença (Leiria) (Leiria) |

| 13 January 2010 2 | Vitória de Guimarães | 1–1 | Benfica | Guimarães |
| 20:15 | Douglas 56' | Report | Coentrão 75' | Stadium: Estádio D. Afonso Henriques; Attendance: 4,318; Referee: Carlos Xistra (Castelo Branco) |

| 23 January 2010 3 | Rio Ave | 1–2 | Benfica | Vila do Conde |
| 20:15 | Gama 53' (pen.) | Report | Di María 49'; Martins 76' | Stadium: Estádio do Rio Ave FC; Attendance: 7,555; Referee: Cosme Machado (Braga) |

==== Semi-finals ====
| 9 February 2010 | Sporting CP | 1–4 | Benfica | Lisbon |
| 20:15 | Liédson 36' | Report | David Luiz 7'; Ramires 29'; Luisão 67'; Cardozo 90+4' | Stadium: Estádio José Alvalade; Attendance: 20,000; Referee: Olegário Benquerença (Leiria) |

==== Final ====
| 21 March 2010 | Benfica | 3–0 | Porto | Faro |
| 19:15 | Amorim 10'; Martins 44'; Cardozo 90+2' | Report | | Stadium: Estádio Algarve; Attendance: 23,430; Referee: Jorge Sousa (Porto) |

=== UEFA Europa League ===
==== Play-off round ====
| 20 August 2009 First leg | Benfica (Portugal) | 4–0 | (Ukraine) Vorskla Poltava | Lisbon, Portugal |
| 20:45 CEST | Di María 31'; Cardozo 55' (pen.); Saviola 57'; Weldon 77' | Report | | Stadium: Estádio da Luz; Attendance: 34,177; Referee: Darko Čeferin (Slovenia) |

| 27 August 2009 Second leg | Vorskla Poltava (Ukraine) | 2–1 (2–5 agg.) | (Portugal) Benfica | Poltava, Ukraine |
| 20:45 CEST | Sachko 48'; Yesin 74' | Report | Saviola 59' | Stadium: Butovsky Vorskla Stadium; Attendance: 22,000; Referee: Claudio Circhetta (Switzerland) |

==== Group stage ====
| Pos | Team | Pld | W | D | L | GF | GA | GD | Pts | Qualification |
|---|---|---|---|---|---|---|---|---|---|---|
| 1 | (Portugal) Benfica | 6 | 5 | 0 | 1 | 13 | 3 | +10 | 15 | Advance to knockout phase |
| 2 | (England) Everton | 6 | 3 | 0 | 3 | 7 | 9 | −2 | 9 | Advance to knockout phase |
| 3 | (Belarus) BATE Borisov | 6 | 2 | 1 | 3 | 7 | 9 | −2 | 7 | |
| 4 | (Greece) AEK Athens | 6 | 1 | 1 | 4 | 5 | 11 | −6 | 4 | |

Source: Soccerway

| 17 September 2009 1 | Benfica (Portugal) | 2–0 | (Belarus) BATE Borisov | Lisbon, Portugal |
| 21:05 CEST | Nuno Gomes 36'; Cardozo 41' | | | Stadium: Estádio da Luz; Attendance: 34,953; Referee: Knut Kircher (Germany) |

| 1 October 2009 2 | AEK Athens (Greece) | 1–0 | (Portugal) Benfica | Athens, Greece |
| 19:00 CEST | Majstorović 43' | | | Stadium: Olympic Stadium; Attendance: 12,420; Referee: Stefan Johannesson (Sweden) |

| 22 October 2009 3 | Benfica (Portugal) | 5–0 | (England) Everton | Lisbon, Portugal |
| 19:00 CEST | Saviola 14', 83'; Cardozo 47', 48'; Luisão 52' | | | Stadium: Estádio da Luz; Attendance: 44,534; Referee: Nikolay Ivanov (Russia) |

| 5 November 2009 4 | Everton (England) | 0–2 | (Portugal) Benfica | Liverpool, England |
| 21:05 CET | | | Saviola 63'; Cardozo 76' | Stadium: Goodison Park; Attendance: 30,790; Referee: Saïd Ennjimi (France) |

| 2 December 2009 5 | BATE Borisov (Belarus) | 1–2 | (Portugal) Benfica | Minsk, Belarus |
| 19:00 CET | Vítor 69' (o.g.) | | Saviola 46'; Coentrão 63' | Stadium: Dinamo Stadium; Attendance: 10,000; Referee: Thomas Einwaller (Austria) |

| 17 December 2009 6 | Benfica (Portugal) | 2–1 | (Greece) AEK Athens | Lisbon, Portugal |
| 21:05 CET | Di María 45', 73' | | Blanco 84' | Stadium: Estádio da Luz; Attendance: 20,000; Referee: Gianluca Rocchi (Italy) |

==== Knockout phase ====
===== Round of 32 =====
| 18 February 2010 First leg | Hertha BSC (Germany) | 1–1 | (Portugal) Benfica | Berlin, Germany |
| 21:05 | García 33' (o.g.) | Report | Di María 4' | Stadium: Olympic Stadium; Attendance: 13,684; Referee: Terje Hauge (Norway) |

| 23 February 2010 Second leg | Benfica (Portugal) | 4–0 (5–1 agg.) | (Germany) Hertha BSC | Lisbon, Portugal |
| 18:00 | Aimar 25'; Cardozo 48', 62'; García 59' | Report | | Stadium: Estádio da Luz; Attendance: 30,402; Referee: Pieter Vink (Netherlands) |

===== Round of 16 =====
| 11 March 2010 First leg | Benfica (Portugal) | 1–1 | (France) Marseille | Lisbon, Portugal |
| 21:05 | Pereira 76' | Report | Ben Arfa 90' | Stadium: Estádio da Luz; Attendance: 46,635; Referee: Felix Brych (Germany) |

| 18 March 2010 Second leg | Marseille (France) | 1–2 (2–3 agg.) | (Portugal) Benfica | Marseille, France |
| 19:00 | Niang 70' | Report | Pereira 75'; Kardec 90+1' | Stadium: Stade Vélodrome; Attendance: 40,000; Referee: Damir Skomina (Slovenia) |

===== Quarter-finals =====
| 1 April 2010 First leg | Benfica (Portugal) | 2–1 | (England) Liverpool | Lisbon, Portugal |
| 21:05 | Cardozo 59' (pen.), 79' (pen.) | Report | Agger 9' | Stadium: Estádio da Luz; Attendance: 62,629; Referee: Jonas Eriksson (Sweden) |

| 8 April 2010 Second leg | Liverpool (England) | 4–1 (5–3 agg.) | (Portugal) Benfica | Liverpool, England |
| 21:05 | Kuyt 27'; Lucas 34'; Torres 59', 82' | Report | Cardozo 70' | Stadium: Anfield; Attendance: 42,377; Referee: Björn Kuipers (Netherlands) |

=== Overall record ===
| Competition | First match | Last match | Record | | | | | | | | |
| Competition | First match | Last match | G | W | D | L | GF | GA | GD | Win % | Source |
|---|---|---|---|---|---|---|---|---|---|---|---|
| Primeira Liga | 16 August 2009 | 9 May 2010 | 30 | 24 | 4 | 2 | 78 | 20 | +58 | 80.00 | |
| Taça de Portugal | 17 October 2009 | 22 November 2009 | 2 | 1 | 0 | 1 | 6 | 1 | +5 | 50.00 | |
| Taça da Liga | 3 January 2010 | 21 March 2010 | 5 | 4 | 1 | 0 | 11 | 3 | +8 | 80.00 | |
| UEFA Europa League | 20 August 2009 | 8 April 2010 | 14 | 9 | 2 | 3 | 29 | 13 | +16 | 64.29 | |
| Total | | | 51 | 38 | 7 | 6 | 124 | 37 | +87 | 74.51 | |

== Player statistics ==
| No. | Pos | Nat | Player | Total | | Primeira Liga | | Portuguese Cup | | League Cup | | Europa League | |
| No. | Pos | Nat | Player | Apps | Goals | Apps | Goals | Apps | Goals | Apps | Goals | Apps | Goals |
Goalkeepers
| 1 | GK | (Portugal) POR | José Moreira | 5 | -5 | 0 | 0 | 2 | -1 | 1 | -1 | 2 | -3 |
| 12 | GK | (Portugal) POR | Quim | 33 | -20 | 30 | -20 | 0 | 0 | 2 | 0 | 1 | 0 |
| 13 | GK | (Brazil) BRA | Júlio César | 14 | -12 | 0 | 0 | 0 | 0 | 2 | -2 | 12 | -10 |
| 31 | GK | (Brazil) BRA | Moretto | 0 | 0 | 0 | 0 | 0 | 0 | 0 | 0 | 0 | 0 |
Defenders
| 3 | LB | (Argentina) ARG | José Shaffer | 6 | 0 | 4 | 0 | 0 | 0 | 0 | 0 | 2 | 0 |
| 4 | CB | (Brazil) BRA | Luisão | 45 | 6 | 28 | 4 | 0 | 0 | 5 | 1 | 12 | 1 |
| 14 | RB | (Uruguay) URU | Maxi Pereira | 37 | 4 | 25 | 2 | 0 | 0 | 4 | 0 | 8 | 2 |
| 15 | CB | (Portugal) POR | Roderick Miranda | 2 | 0 | 0 | 0 | 0 | 0 | 1 | 0 | 1 | 0 |
| 18 | LB | (Portugal) POR | Fábio Coentrão | 45 | 3 | 26 | 0 | 2 | 1 | 4 | 1 | 13 | 1 |
| 22 | RB | (Portugal) POR | Luís Filipe | 3 | 0 | 1 | 0 | 0 | 0 | 0 | 0 | 2 | 0 |
| 23 | CB | (Brazil) BRA | David Luiz | 49 | 3 | 29 | 2 | 2 | 0 | 5 | 1 | 13 | 0 |
| 25 | LB | (Portugal) POR | César Peixoto | 29 | 1 | 15 | 0 | 1 | 1 | 3 | 0 | 10 | 0 |
| 27 | CB | (Brazil) BRA | Sidnei | 10 | 0 | 5 | 0 | 2 | 0 | 0 | 0 | 3 | 0 |
| 28 | CB | (Portugal) POR | Miguel Vítor | 7 | 0 | 2 | 0 | 1 | 0 | 0 | 0 | 4 | 0 |
| 35 | LB | (Portugal) POR | Jorge Ribeiro | 0 | 0 | 0 | 0 | 0 | 0 | 0 | 0 | 0 | 0 |
Midfielders
| 2 | DM | (Brazil) BRA | Airton | 6 | 0 | 4 | 0 | 0 | 0 | 1 | 0 | 1 | 0 |
| 6 | DM | (Spain) ESP | Javi García | 46 | 4 | 26 | 3 | 2 | 0 | 4 | 0 | 14 | 1 |
| 5 | CM | (Portugal) POR | Ruben Amorim | 38 | 4 | 24 | 3 | 2 | 0 | 2 | 1 | 10 | 0 |
| 8 | CM | (Brazil) BRA | Ramires | 43 | 5 | 26 | 4 | 1 | 0 | 4 | 1 | 12 | 0 |
| 10 | AM | (Argentina) ARG | Pablo Aimar | 41 | 5 | 25 | 4 | 1 | 0 | 4 | 0 | 11 | 1 |
| 16 | RW | (Uruguay) URU | Urreta | 2 | 0 | 1 | 0 | 0 | 0 | 0 | 0 | 1 | 0 |
| 17 | AM | (Portugal) POR | Carlos Martins | 8 | 0 | 6 | 0 | 1 | 0 | 0 | 0 | 1 | 0 |
| 20 | RW | (Argentina) ARG | Ángel Di María | 45 | 10 | 26 | 5 | 1 | 0 | 4 | 1 | 14 | 4 |
| 24 | MF | (Brazil) BRA | Felipe Menezes | 8 | 1 | 4 | 0 | 1 | 0 | 0 | 0 | 3 | 1 |
Strikers
| 7 | FW | (Paraguay) PAR | Óscar Cardozo | 47 | 38 | 29 | 26 | 0 | 0 | 5 | 2 | 13 | 10 |
| 9 | FW | (Angola) ANG | Mantorras | 1 | 0 | 0 | 0 | 1 | 0 | 0 | 0 | 0 | 0 |
| 11 | FW | (Brazil) BRA | Keirrison | 7 | 0 | 5 | 0 | 1 | 0 | 0 | 0 | 1 | 0 |
| 19 | FW | (Brazil) BRA | Weldon | 18 | 6 | 12 | 5 | 1 | 0 | 2 | 0 | 3 | 1 |
| 21 | FW | (Portugal) POR | Nuno Gomes | 23 | 4 | 13 | 3 | 2 | 0 | 2 | 0 | 6 | 1 |
| 30 | FW | (Argentina) ARG | Javier Saviola | 44 | 19 | 27 | 11 | 2 | 1 | 4 | 1 | 11 | 6 |
| 31 | FW | (Brazil) BRA | Alan Kardec | 13 | 1 | 8 | 0 | 0 | 0 | 3 | 0 | 2 | 1 |
| 32 | FW | (Brazil) BRA | Éder Luís | 10 | 1 | 6 | 1 | 0 | 0 | 1 | 0 | 3 | 0 |

== Transfers ==
=== In ===
==== Summer ====
| No. | Pos. | Name | Age | Moving From | Type of Transfer | Contract Ends | Transfer fee | Notes | Source |
|---|---|---|---|---|---|---|---|---|---|
| 6 | MF | (Spain) Javi García | 22 | (Spain) Real Madrid | Transfer | 2014 | €7M | N/A | |
| 8 | MF | (Brazil) Ramires | 22 | (Brazil) Cruzeiro | Transfer | 2014 | €7.5M | N/A | |
| 30 | FW | (Argentina) Javier Saviola | 27 | (Spain) Real Madrid | Transfer | 2012 | €5M | N/A | |
| 2 | DF | (Brazil) Patric | 20 | (Brazil) São Caetano | Transfer | 2013 | €1.9M | N/A | |
| 3 | DF | (Argentina) José Shaffer | 23 | (Argentina) Racing Club | Transfer | 2013 | €1.7M | N/A | |
| 13 | GK | (Brazil) Júlio César | 22 | (Portugal) Belenenses | Transfer | 2014 | €0.5M | N/A | |
| 25 | DF | (Portugal) César Peixoto | 29 | (Portugal) Braga | Transfer | 2012 | €0.4M | N/A | |
| 24 | MF | (Brazil) Felipe Menezes | 21 | (Brazil) Goiás | Transfer | 2014 | €1.1M | N/A | |
| 19 | FW | (Brazil) Weldon | 28 | (Brazil) Recife | Transfer | 2011 | €0.2M | N/A | |
| 11 | FW | (Brazil) Keirrison | 20 | (Spain) Barcelona | Loan | 2010 | Undisclosed | N/A | |
| 22 | DF | (Portugal) Luís Filipe | 29 | (Portugal) Vitória de Guimarães | Loan return | 2011 | Free | N/A | |
| 18 | FW | (Portugal) Fábio Coentrão | 20 | (Portugal) Rio Ave | Loan return | 2012 | Free | N/A | |
| # | DF | (Brazil) Leandro Silva | 20 | (Brazil) Coritiba | Transfer | 2015 | Free | N/A | |
| # | FW | (Portugal) Ivan Santos | 20 | (Portugal) Boavista | Loan return | 2012 | Free | N/A | |
| # | FW | (China) Yu Dabao | 21 | (Portugal) Olivais e Moscavide | Loan return | 2009 | Free | N/A | |
| # | DF | (Portugal) Ruben Lima | 19 | (Portugal) Desportivo das Aves | Loan return | 2012 | Free | N/A | |
| # | MF | (Portugal) Miguel Rosa | 20 | (Portugal) Estoril | Loan return | 2012 | Free | N/A | |
| # | DF | (Romania) László Sepsi | 23 | (Spain) Racing Santander | Loan return | 2012 | Free | N/A | |
| # | DF | (Brazil) Edcarlos | 24 | (Brazil) Fluminense | Loan return | 2013 | Free | N/A | |
| # | FW | (Portugal) Ariza Makukula | 28 | (England) Bolton Wanderers | Loan return | 2013 | Free | N/A | |
| # | MF | (Argentina) Andrés Díaz | 25 | (Argentina) Banfield | Loan return | 2011 | Free | N/A | |
| # | DF | (Ivory Coast) Marco Zoro | 25 | (Portugal) Vitória de Setúbal | Loan return | 2011 | Free | N/A | |
| # | DF | (Algeria) Rafik Halliche | 22 | (Portugal) Nacional | Loan return | 2013 | Free | N/A | |
| # | FW | (Brazil) Marcel | 27 | (Japan) Vissel Kobe | Loan Return | 2012 | Free | N/A | |
| # | FW | (Portugal) André Carvalhas | 20 | (Portugal) Olhanense | Loan return | 2012 | Free | N/A | |
| # | MF | (Portugal) Romeu Ribeiro | 20 | (Portugal) Desportivo das Aves | Loan return | 2011 | Free | N/A | |
| # | FW | (United States) Freddy Adu | 20 | (France) Monaco | Loan return | 2013 | Free | N/A | |

==== Winter ====
| No. | Pos. | Name | Age | Moving From | Type of Transfer | Contract Ends | Transfer fee | Notes | Source |
|---|---|---|---|---|---|---|---|---|---|
| 2 | MF | (Brazil) Airton | 19 | (Brazil) Flamengo | Transfer | 2015 | €2.6M | N/A | |
| 31 | FW | (Brazil) Alan Kardec | 20 | (Brazil) Vasco da Gama | Transfer | 2015 | €2.5M | N/A | |
| 32 | FW | (Brazil) Éder Luís | 24 | (Brazil) Atlético Mineiro | Transfer | 2015 | €2M | For 50% economic right's | |

Spend : ▼€32.4M

=== Out ===
==== Summer ====
| No. | Pos. | Name | Age | Moving to | Type of transfer | Transfer fee | Source |
|---|---|---|---|---|---|---|---|
| # | MF | (Greece) Kostas Katsouranis | 31 | (Greece) Panathinaikos | Transfer | €3.5M | |
| # | DF | (Brazil) Edcarlos | 23 | (Mexico) Cruz Azul | Transfer | €1.3M | |
| # | DF | (Romania) László Sepsi | 23 | (Romania) Politehnica Timișoara | Transfer | €1.3M | |
| # | MF | (Portugal) Romeu Ribeiro | 20 | (Portugal) Marítimo | Transfer | Free | |
| # | MF | (Argentina) Andrés Díaz | 26 | - | Contract terminated | Free | |
| 2 | DF | (Brazil) Patric | 20 | (Brazil) Cruzeiro | Loan | €0.15M | |
| 26 | MF | (Algeria) Hassan Yebda | 25 | (England) Portsmouth | Loan | €0.48M | |
| # | MF | (Cameroon) Gilles Binya | 24 | (Switzerland) Neuchâtel Xamax | Loan | Free | |
| # | DF | (Algeria) Rafik Halliche | 22 | (Portugal) Nacional | Loan | Free | |
| # | FW | (United States) Freddy Adu | 20 | (Portugal) Belenenses | Loan | Free | |
| # | FW | (China) Yu Dabao | 21 | (Portugal) Mafra | Loan | Free | |
| # | DF | (Ivory Coast) Marco Zoro | 25 | (Portugal) Vitória Setúbal | Loan | Free | |
| # | FW | (Ghana) Ishmael Yartey | 19 | (Portugal) Beira-Mar | Loan | Free | |
| # | DF | (Brazil) Leandro da Silva | 20 | (Portugal) Guimarães | Loan | Free | |
| # | FW | (Brazil) Marcel | 27 | (Brazil) Santos FC | Loan | Free | |
| # | MF | (Brazil) Fellipe Bastos | 19 | (Portugal) Belenenses | Loan | Free | |
| # | DF | (Portugal) Ruben Lima | 19 | (Portugal) Vitória Setúbal | Loan | Free | |
| # | FW | (Portugal) André Carvalhas | 19 | (Portugal) Fátima | Loan | Free | |
| # | FW | (Portugal) Ivan Santos | 20 | (Portugal) Carregado | Loan | Free | |
| # | MF | (Portugal) Miguel Rosa | 20 | (Portugal) Carregado | Loan | Free | |
| # | FW | (Portugal) Ariza Makukula | 28 | (Turkey) Kayserispor | Loan | Free | |
| # | DF | (Portugal) Abel Pereira | 19 | (Portugal) Mafra | Loan | Free | |
| # | FW | (Portugal) Hélio Vaz | 18 | (Portugal) Mafra | Loan | Free | |
| # | FW | (Portugal) André Soares | 19 | (Portugal) Carregado | Loan | Free | |
| # | FW | (Portugal) José Coelho | 19 | (Portugal) Paços de Ferreira | Loan | Free | |
| # | MF | (Portugal) David Simão | 19 | (Portugal) Fátima | Loan | Free | |
| # | DF | (Portugal) João Pereira | 19 | (Portugal) Fátima | Loan | Free | |
| # | FW | (Spain) José Antonio Reyes | 24 | (Spain) Atlético Madrid | Loan return | - | |
| # | FW | (Honduras) David Suazo | 28 | (Italy) Internazionale | Loan return | - | |

==== Winter ====
| No. | Pos. | Name | Age | Moving to | Type of transfer | Transfer fee | Source |
|---|---|---|---|---|---|---|---|
| # | FW | (China) Yu Dabao | 21 | (China) Tianjin Teda | Transfer | Free | |
| # | GK | (Brazil) Moretto | 31 | (Brazil) Brasiliense | Contract terminated | Free | |
| 11 | FW | (Brazil) Keirrison | 20 | (Spain) Barcelona | Loan return | Free | |
| # | MF | (Brazil) Fellipe Bastos | 19 | (Switzerland) Servette | Loan | Free | |
| 2 | DF | (Brazil) Patric | 20 | (Brazil) Avaí | Loan | €0.1M | |
| 3 | DF | (Argentina) José Shaffer | 24 | (Argentina) Banfield | Loan | Free | |
| # | FW | (Uruguay) Urreta | 19 | (Uruguay) Peñarol | Loan | Free | |
| # | FW | (United States) Freddy Adu | 20 | (Turkey) Aris | Loan | Free | |
| # | FW | (Equatorial Guinea) Javier Balboa | 24 | (Spain) Cartagena | Loan | Free | |
| # | FW | (Portugal) Nélson Oliveira | 18 | (Portugal) Rio Ave | Loan | Free | |
| # | DF | (Portugal) Abel Pereira | 20 | (Portugal) Tondela | Loan | Free | |
| # | FW | (Portugal) Ivan Santos | 21 | (Portugal) Atlético CP | Loan | Free | |
| # | FW | (Portugal) Hélio Vaz | 19 | (Portugal) Tondela | Loan | Free | |
| # | FW | (Portugal) André Soares | 19 | (Portugal) Atlético CP | Loan | Free | |

Transfer income: ▲€6.83M

=== Overall transfer activity ===
==== Spending ====
Summer: ▼€25,300,000
Winter: ▼€7,100,000
Total: ▼€32,400,000

==== Income ====
Summer: ▲€6,730,000
Winter: ▲€100,000
Total: ▲€6,830,000

==== Expenditure ====
Summer: ▼€18,570,000
Winter: ▼€7,000,000
Total: ▼€25,570,000

== Filmography ==
- Benfica - Campeões Nacionais 09/10 [Benfica - 2009–10 National Champions] (DVD) (in Portuguese). Lisbon, Portugal: Valentim de Carvalho Multimédia. 9 June 2010.
