= 2011–12 S.L. Benfica season =

Benfica
2011–12 season
- President: Luís Filipe Vieira
- Head coach: Jorge Jesus
- Stadium: Estádio da Luz
- Primeira Liga: 2nd
- Taça de Portugal: Fifth round
- Taça da Liga: Winners
- UEFA Champions League: Quarter-finals
- Top goalscorer: League: Óscar Cardozo (20); All: Óscar Cardozo (28)
- Highest home attendance: 63,822 v Manchester United (14 September 2011)
- Lowest home attendance: 14,453 v Santa Clara (18 January 2012)
- Average home league attendance: 42,530
- Biggest win: União de Leiria 0–4 Benfica (8 January 2012); Benfica 5–1 Rio Ave (16 December 2011)
- Biggest defeat: 1 goal difference in 7 matches
Home colours	Away colours

The 2011–12 season was Sport Lisboa e Benfica's 108th season in existence and the club's 78th consecutive season in the top flight of Portuguese football. It involved Benfica competing in the Primeira Liga, Taça de Portugal, Taça da Liga and the UEFA Champions League. Benfica qualified for the Champions League by finishing second in the previous Primeira Liga.

In Jesus' third season at the helm of the club, he tried to implement a more balanced system, with Axel Witsel replacing Pablo Aimar as a more central midfielder, with Aimar pushed as to second striker role, to give more defensive support than Javier Saviola. Nicolás Gaitán was moved to the right, with Bruno César and Nolito alternating on the left. Rodrigo eventually gained his space in the starting eleven, replacing Aimar.

This season, Benfica placed first in their UEFA Champions League group, later reaching the competition's quarter-finals, and won their fourth Taça da Liga by defeating Gil Vicente.

== Competitions ==
Win Draw Loss Postponed

=== Pre-season ===
9 July 2011 Friendly	Benfica	9–1	Fribourg Regional Team	Fribourg, Switzerland
19:45 CET (UTC+01)	Cardozo 15', 21', 30', 43'; Saviola 39' (pen.); Gaitán 41'; Nolito 51'; Rodrigo 58'; Vítor 71'			Stadium: Stade Universitaire Saint-Léonard; Referee: Stephan Klossner

10 July 2011 Friendly	Servette	1–1	Benfica	Geneva, Switzerland
19:45 CET (UTC+01)	Vitkieviez 25'		Gaitán 11'	Stadium: Stade de Genève; Attendance: 12,699

12 July 2011 Friendly	Dijon	2–1	Benfica	Nyon, Switzerland
19:30 CET (UTC+01)	Cacérès 40'; Courgnaud 72'		Urretavizcaya 90+1'	Stadium: Centre sportif de Colovray Nyon; Referee: Ludovic Gremaud

15 July 2011 Guadiana Trophy	Benfica	3–1	Paris Saint-Germain	Faro, Portugal
20:45 CET (UTC+01)	Cardozo 11'; Jara 89'; Saviola 89'		Nenê 14'	Stadium: Estádio do Algarve; Referee: João Ferreira

17 July 2011 Guadiana Trophy	Benfica	2–2	Anderlecht	Faro, Portugal
20:45 CET (UTC+01)	Saviola 16'; Urretavizcaya 58'		Lukaku 27'; Suárez 45+1'	Stadium: Estádio do Algarve; Referee: Duarte Gomes

20 July 2011 Friendly	Benfica	1–0	Toulouse	Lisbon, Portugal
19:00 CET (UTC+01)	Jardel 88'			Stadium: Estádio da Luz; Attendance: 33,416; Referee: Hugo Miguel

6 August 2011 Eusébio Cup	Benfica	2–1	Arsenal	Lisbon, Portugal
19:00 WEST (UTC+01:00)	Aimar 50'; Nolito 60'		Van Persie 34'	Stadium: Estádio da Luz; Attendance: 40,833; Referee: Duarte Gomes

=== Primeira Liga ===
==== League table ====
Pos	Team	Pld	W	D	L	GF	GA	GD	Pts	Qualification or relegation
1	Porto (C)	30	23	6	1	69	19	+50	75	Qualification to Champions League group stage
2	Benfica	30	21	6	3	66	27	+39	69	Qualification to Champions League group stage
3	Braga	30	19	5	6	59	29	+30	62	Qualification to Champions League play-off round
4	Sporting CP	30	18	5	7	47	26	+21	59	Qualification to Europa League play-off round
5	Marítimo	30	14	8	8	41	38	+3	50	Qualification to Europa League third qualifying round

Source: LPFP (in Portuguese)
Rules for classification: 1) Points; 2) Head-to-head points; 3) Head-to-head goal difference; 4) Head-to-head away goals scored; 5) Goal difference; 6) Matches won; 7) Goals scored; 8) Play-off.
(Note: LPFP decided that only criteria 1, 5, 6 and 7 would be applied to establish the classification during the competition.)
(C) Champions

==== Results by round ====
Round	1	2	3	4	5	6	7	8	9	10	11	12	13	14	15	16	17	18	19	20	21	22	23	24	25	26	27	28	29	30
Ground	A	H	A	H	H	A	H	A	H	A	H	A	H	A	H	H	A	H	A	A	H	A	H	A	H	A	H	A	H	A
Result	D	W	W	W	W	D	W	W	W	D	W	W	W	W	W	W	W	W	L	D	L	W	W	D	W	L	W	D	W	W
Position	4	3	2	2	2	2	2	2	2	2	2	2	2	1	1	1	1	1	1	1	2	2	2	3	2	2	2	2	2	2

Source: ForaDeJogo.net
A = Away; H = Home; W = Win; D = Draw; L = Loss

==== Matches ====
12 August 2011 1	Gil Vicente	2–2	Benfica	Barcelos
20:45 CET (UTC+01)	Vieira 37' (yellow card) 77'; Laionel 74'; Vilela (yellow card) 76'	Report	Nolito 7'; Saviola 20'	Stadium: Estádio Cidade de Barcelos; Attendance: 12,008; Referee: João Ferreira

20 August 2011 2	Benfica	3–1	Feirense	Lisbon
20:45 CET (UTC+01)	Nolito 14'; Cardozo 75'; Bruno César 90+1'; Saviola (yellow card) 90+3'	Report	Cunha (yellow card) 46'; Rabiola 53'; Luciano (yellow card) 61'; Sténio (yellow card) 70'; Ludovic (yellow card) 83'	Stadium: Estádio da Luz; Attendance: 35,856; Referee: Hugo Pacheco

29 August 2011 3	Nacional	0–2	Benfica	Funchal
21:45 CET (UTC+01)	Aurélio (yellow card) 49' (yellow-red card) 62'; Danielson (yellow card) 52'; Lopes (yellow card) 67'; Costa (yellow card) 78'	Report	Cardozo 22' (yellow card) 41'; Emerson (yellow card) 54'; García (yellow card) 60'; Bruno César 90+4'	Stadium: Estádio da Madeira; Attendance: 3,257; Referee: Artur Soares Dias

10 September 2011 4	Benfica	2–1	Vitória de Guimarães	Lisbon
19:30 CET (UTC+01)	Cardozo 33' (pen.), 45' (pen.); Garay (yellow card) 69'; Emerson (yellow card) 84'; Pereira (yellow card) 88'; Artur (yellow card) 90'	Report	Alex (yellow card) 20'; João Paulo (yellow card) 35'; El Adoua (yellow card) 38'; Teles (yellow card) 43'; N'Diaye (yellow card) 45'; Silva 63'; Alves (yellow card) 80'	Stadium: Estádio da Luz; Attendance: 38,917; Referee: Vasco Santos

18 September 2011 5	Benfica	4–1	Académica de Coimbra	Lisbon
21:15 CET (UTC+01)	Bruno César (yellow card) 9' (goal) 26'; Nolito 42', 90+1' (yellow card) 74'; Pereira (yellow card) 77'; Aimar 82'	Report	Sow (yellow card) 7'; Danilo 40'; Adrien (yellow card) 64'	Stadium: Estádio da Luz; Attendance: 32,191; Referee: Vasco Santos

23 September 2011 6	Porto	2–2	Benfica	Porto
21:15 CET (UTC+01)	Otamendi (yellow card) 9' (goal) 51'; Kléber 37' (yellow card) 77'; Fucile (yellow card) 43'; Pereira (yellow card) 57'; Fernando (yellow card) 78'; Moutinho (yellow card) 90+1'	Report	Luisão (yellow card) 40'; García (yellow card) 40'; Cardozo (yellow card) 43' (goal) 47'; Gaitán 82'; Bruno César (yellow card) 89'	Stadium: Estádio do Dragão; Attendance: 49,511; Referee: Jorge Sousa

1 October 2011 7	Benfica	4–1	Paços de Ferreira	Lisbon
21:30 CET (UTC+01)	Saviola 22', 43'; Matić (yellow card) 45+1'; Luisão (yellow card) 51' (goal) 65'; Gaitán (yellow card) 52'; Nolito 66' (yellow card) 88'	Report	Melgarejo (yellow card) 8'; Michel 51' (pen.); Josué (yellow card) 54'; Luisinho (yellow card) 68'	Stadium: Estádio da Luz; Attendance: 33,467; Referee: Bruno Esteves

22 October 2011 8	Beira-Mar	0–1	Benfica	Aveiro
21:15 CET (UTC+01)	Joãozinho (yellow card) 13'; Coelho (yellow card) 49'; Tavares (yellow card) 70'; Moreira (yellow card) 70'	Report	Bruno César (yellow card) 11'; Cardozo 42'; Saviola (yellow card) 45+1'; Matić (yellow card) 59'; Amorim (yellow card) 71'	Stadium: Estádio Municipal de Aveiro; Attendance: 17,845; Referee: Paulo Baptista

29 October 2011 9	Benfica	2–1	Olhanense	Lisbon
21:30 CET (UTC+01)	Rodrigo 1', 13'; Luisão (yellow card) 52'	Report	Eduardo 48'; Djalmir (yellow card) 77'	Stadium: Estádio da Luz; Attendance: 35,319; Referee: Marco Ferreira

6 November 2011 10	Braga	1–1	Benfica	Braga
19:00 CET (UTC+01)	Mahamat (yellow card) 7'; Lima 45' (pen.); Viana (yellow card) 60'; Mossoró (yellow card) 72'; Alan (yellow card) 79'	Report	Emerson (yellow card) 45'; García (yellow card) 55'; Rodrigo 73'; Garay (yellow card) 76'; Amorim (yellow card) 82'	Stadium: Estádio Municipal de Braga; Attendance: 18,688; Referee: Pedro Proença

26 November 2011 11	Benfica	1–0	Sporting CP	Lisbon
21:15 CET (UTC+01)	García 42'; Aimar (yellow card) 45+2'; Cardozo (yellow card) 48' (yellow-red card) 63'	Report	Elias (yellow card) 2'; Carriço (yellow card) 21'; Van Wolfswinkel (yellow card) 48'; Carrillo (yellow card) 81'; Santos (yellow card) 84'; Schaars (yellow card) 87'	Stadium: Estádio da Luz; Attendance: 63,146; Referee: João Capela

11 December 2011 12	Marítimo	0–1	Benfica	Funchal
21:15 CET (UTC+01)	Roberto (yellow card) 39'; Miranda (yellow card) 40'; Olberdam (yellow card) 42' (yellow-red card) 47'	Report	García (yellow card) 29'; Emerson (yellow card) 40'; Aimar (yellow card) 50'; Pereira (yellow card) 63'; Cardozo 85'; Jardel (yellow card) 90+2'	Stadium: Estádio dos Barreiros; Attendance: 5,000; Referee: Jorge Sousa

16 December 2011 13	Benfica	5–1	Rio Ave	Lisbon
21:15 CET (UTC+01)	Pereira (yellow card) 22'; Cardozo 34' (pen.); Nolito 36', 72'; Saviola 45'; Garay 48'; Witsel (yellow card) 64'	Report	Bruno China (yellow card) 9'; Atsu 25'; Éder (yellow card) 33'; Kelvin (yellow card) 77'	Stadium: Estádio da Luz; Attendance: 33,996; Referee: Bruno Esteves

8 January 2012 14	União de Leiria	0–4	Benfica	Marinha Grande
19:15 CET (UTC+01)	Djaniny (yellow card) 25'	Report	Bruno César 10'; Cardozo 48'; García (yellow card) 62'; Rodrigo 73', 76'; Luisão (yellow card) 87'	Stadium: Municipal da Marinha Grande; Attendance: 8,378; Referee: Cosme Machado

14 January 2012 15	Benfica	4–1	Vitória de Setúbal	Lisbon
19:30 CET (UTC+01)	Nolito 24'; Cardozo 33', 45' (yellow card) 39' (yellow-red card) 85'; Matić 73'	Report	Neca 6'; Silva (yellow card) 39'; Santos (yellow card) 39'; Tengarrinha (yellow card) 53'	Stadium: Estádio da Luz; Attendance: 56,155; Referee: Hélder Malheiro

22 January 2012 16	Benfica	3–1	Gil Vicente	Lisbon
21:15 CET (UTC+01)	Cardozo 27'; Rodrigo 72' (yellow card) 88'; Aimar 74'	Report	Galo 40'; Daniel (yellow card) 53'; Cunha (yellow card) 71'; Luís Manuel (yellow card) 71'	Stadium: Estádio da Luz; Attendance: 45,214; Referee: Marco Ferreira

28 January 2012 17	Feirense	1–2	Benfica	Santa Maria da Feira
21:30 CET (UTC+01)	De Freitas (yellow card) 6'; Varela 50' (yellow card) 72'; Ludovic (yellow card) 72'	Report	García (yellow card) 36'; Varela 54' (o.g.); Artur (yellow card) 57'; Cardozo 73' (pen.); Pereira (yellow card) 82'	Stadium: Estádio Marcolino de Castro; Attendance: 3,622; Referee: Rui Costa

11 February 2012 18	Benfica	4–1	Nacional	Lisbon
21:30 CET (UTC+01)	Garay 9'; Cardozo 21'; Rodrigo 39', 61'; Witsel (yellow card) 51'	Report	Todorović (yellow card) 15'; Claudemir 29' (pen.) (yellow card) 58'; Barcelos (yellow card) 65'; Neto (yellow card) 78'; Danielson (yellow card) 81'; Candeias (yellow card) 85'	Stadium: Estádio da Luz; Attendance: 53,238; Referee: Jorge Sousa

20 February 2012 19	Vitória de Guimarães	1–0	Benfica	Guimarães
21:15 CET (UTC+01)	João Paulo (yellow card) 26'; Toscano (yellow card) 32' (goal) 37'; Alves (yellow card) 78'	Report	Pereira (yellow card) 19'; Matić (yellow card) 36'; Aimar (yellow card) 67'; Witsel (yellow card) 71'; Luisão (yellow card) 76'	Stadium: Estádio D. Afonso Henriques; Attendance: 19,052; Referee: Carlos Xistra

25 February 2012 20	Académica de Coimbra	0–0	Benfica	Coimbra
21:15 CET (UTC+01)	Diogo (yellow card) 36'; Ferreira (yellow card) 64'; Cédric (yellow card) 82'; Adrien (yellow card) 90+1'; Peiser (yellow card) 90+7'	Report	Matić (yellow card) 45+1'; Pereira (yellow card) 60'; Nolito (yellow card) 90+7'	Stadium: Estádio Cidade de Coimbra; Attendance: 14,011; Referee: Hugo Miguel

2 March 2012 21	Benfica	2–3	Porto	Lisbon
21:15 CET (UTC+01)	Cardozo 42', 48' (yellow card) 45+1'; Emerson (yellow card) 63' (yellow-red card) 77'; M. Pereira (yellow card) 90+4'	Report	Hulk 7' (yellow card) 90+2'; Rolando (yellow card) 21'; Á. Pereira (yellow card) 24'; Djalma (yellow card) 29'; Rodríguez 64'; Maicon 87'; Helton (yellow card) 90+1'	Stadium: Estádio da Luz; Attendance: 58,222; Referee: Pedro Proença

11 March 2012 22	Paços de Ferreira	1–2	Benfica	Paços de Ferreira
19:15 CET (UTC+01)	Michel (yellow card) 22' (yellow-red card) 76' (goal) 28'; Luíz Carlos (yellow card) 67'; Ricardo (red card) 89'	Report	García (yellow card) 10'; Bruno César (yellow card) 42' (goal) 68'; Luisão (yellow card) 49'; Gaitán 63'; Oliveira (yellow card) 83'; Pereira (yellow card) 85'; Artur (yellow card) 90+2'	Stadium: Estádio da Mata Real; Attendance: 4,528; Referee: Bruno Esteves

16 March 2012 23	Benfica	3–1	Beira-Mar	Lisbon
22:15 CET (UTC+01)	Cardozo 26', 48'; Gaitán 44'; Bruno César (yellow card) 61'; Witsel (yellow card) 88'	Report	Cássio (yellow card) 90+1'	Stadium: Estádio da Luz; Attendance: 33,986; Referee: Manuel Mota

23 March 2012 24	Olhanense	0–0	Benfica	Olhão
21:45 CET (UTC+01)	Agra (yellow card) 32'; Maurício (yellow card) 64'; Toy (yellow card) 81'; Vinha (yellow card) 83'; Meza (yellow card) 89'	Report	Emerson (yellow card) 32'; Aimar (red card) 63'; Jardel (yellow card) 64'; Oliveira (yellow card) 90+5'	Stadium: Estádio José Arcanjo; Attendance: 4,842; Referee: João Capela

31 March 2012 25	Benfica	2–1	Braga	Lisbon
22:15 CET (UTC+01)	Vítor (yellow card) 32'; Luisão (yellow card) 65'; Witsel 77' (pen.); Bruno César 90+2'	Report	Douglão (yellow card) 13'; Elderson 82'	Stadium: Estádio da Luz; Attendance: 49,078; Referee: João Ferreira

9 April 2012 26	Sporting CP	1–0	Benfica	Lisbon
21:15 CET (UTC+01)	Van Wolfswinkel 18' (pen.); Schaars (yellow card) 40'; Xandão (yellow card) 45'; Pereira (yellow card) 64'; Polga (yellow card) 69'; Elias (yellow card) 81'; Carriço (yellow card) 81'	Report	Luisão (yellow card) 17' (yellow-red card) 90'; García (yellow card) 28'; Oliveira (yellow card) 64'; Nolito (yellow card) 75'; Witsel (yellow card) 80'	Stadium: Estádio José Alvalade; Attendance: 47,409; Referee: Artur Soares Dias

21 April 2012 27	Benfica	4–1	Marítimo	Lisbon
18:00 CET (UTC+01)	Nolito 15', 19'; Rodrigo 65'; Bruno César 69'; Capdevila (yellow card) 90'	Report	Roberto (yellow card) 25'; Sami (yellow card) 34' (goal) 52'	Stadium: Estádio da Luz; Attendance: 40,099; Referee: Bruno Paixão

29 April 2012 28	Rio Ave	2–2	Benfica	Vila do Conde
20:15 CET (UTC+01)	Atsu 8'; Pinto (yellow card) 16'; Gaspar (yellow card) 40'; Yazalde 51'; Kelvin (yellow card) 66'; Braga (yellow card) 72'	Report	Pereira (yellow card) 37'; Nolito 37' (yellow card) 53'; Cardozo 40' (pen.); Matić (yellow card) 43'; Capdevila (yellow card) 55'; García (yellow card) 78'	Stadium: Estádio do Rio Ave FC; Attendance: 3,706; Referee: Olegário Benquerença

5 May 2012 29	Benfica	1–0	União de Leiria	Lisbon
21:30 CET (UTC+01)	Garay (yellow card) 14'; Bruno César 21'; Pereira (yellow card) 26'; Almeida (yellow card) 87'	Report	Ogu (yellow card) 37'	Stadium: Estádio da Luz; Attendance: 30,070; Referee: Rui Costa

12 May 2012 30	Vitória de Setúbal	1–3	Benfica	Setúbal
19:30 CET (UTC+01)	Lopes 12'; Santos (yellow card) 36'; Neca (yellow card) 56'; Suswam (yellow card) 73'	Report	Matić (yellow card) 31'; Bruno César 34', 62' (yellow card) 57'; Cardozo 90'	Stadium: Estádio do Bonfim; Attendance: 5,590; Referee: Jorge Sousa

=== Taça de Portugal ===
14 October 2011 Third round	Portimonense	0–2	Benfica	Portimão
21:15 CET (UTC+01)		Report		Stadium: Estádio Municipal de Portimão

18 November 2011 Fourth round	Naval 1º de Maio	0–1	Benfica	Figueira da Foz
21:15 CET (UTC+01)	Godinho (yellow card) 50'	Report	Nolito (yellow card) 63'; Mora (yellow card) 73'; Rodrigo 83'	Stadium: Estádio Municipal José Bento Pessoa; Attendance: 1,500; Referee: Artur Soares Dias

2 December 2011 Fifth round	Marítimo	2–1	Benfica	Funchal
21:15 CET (UTC+01)	Briguel (yellow card) 25'; Dias (yellow card) 28'; Roberto 60'; Sami 70'; João Guilherme (yellow card) 79'; Miranda (yellow card) 90'	Report	Saviola 26' (pen.); Gaitán (yellow card) 39'	Stadium: Estádio dos Barreiros; Attendance: 5,000; Referee: Paulo Baptista

=== Taça da Liga ===
==== Group stage ====
3 January 2012 1	Vitória de Guimarães	1–4	Benfica	Guimarães
20:45	João Paulo 48'	Report	Witsel 11'; Cardozo 65', 83'; Rodrigo 88'	Stadium: Estádio D. Afonso Henriques; Attendance: 7,237; Referee: Bruno Paixão

18 January 2012 2	Benfica	2–0	Santa Clara	Lisbon
20:15	Oliveira 68'; Witsel 75'	Report		Stadium: Estádio da Luz; Attendance: 14,453; Referee: Rui Silva

5 February 2012 3	Benfica	3–0	Marítimo	Lisbon
20:30	Oliveira 13'; Rodrigo 72', 80'	Report		Stadium: Estádio da Luz; Attendance: 19,594; Referee: Artur Soares Dias

==== Knockout phase ====
20 March 2012 Semi-finals	Benfica	3–2	Porto	Lisbon
20:45	Pereira 4'; Nolito 43'; Cardozo 77'	Report	González 8'; Mangala 17'	Stadium: Estádio da Luz; Attendance: 28,553; Referee: Artur Soares Dias

14 April 2012 Final	Benfica	2–1	Gil Vicente	Coimbra
20:45	Rodrigo 31'; Gaitán (yellow card) 81'; Saviola 83' (yellow card) 85'; Bruno César (yellow card) 85'	Report	Luís Manuel (yellow card) 50'; Zé Luís 79'; Cláudio (yellow card) 85'	Stadium: Estádio Cidade de Coimbra; Attendance: 23,452; Referee: Jorge Sousa

=== UEFA Champions League ===
==== Third qualifying round ====
27 July 2011 First leg	Benfica (Portugal)	2–0	(Turkey) Trabzonspor	Lisbon, Portugal
20:45	Nolito 71'; Gaitán 88'	Report		Stadium: Estádio da Luz; Attendance: 37,341; Referee: Stephan Studer (Switzerland)

3 August 2011 Second leg	Trabzonspor (Turkey)	1–1 (1–3 agg.)	(Portugal) Benfica	Istanbul, Turkey
20:45	Paulo Henrique 32'	Report	Nolito 19'	Stadium: Atatürk Olympic Stadium^{9} Attendance: 32,060; Referee: Aleksandar Stavrev (Macedonia)

==== Play-off round ====
16 August 2011 First leg	Twente (Netherlands)	2–2	(Portugal) Benfica	Enschede, Netherlands
20:45	De Jong 6'; Ruiz 80'	Report	Cardozo 21'; Nolito 35'	Stadium: De Grolsch Veste; Attendance: 20,000; Referee: Alberto Undiano Mallenco (Spain)

24 August 2011 Second leg	Benfica (Portugal)	3–1 (5–3 agg.)	(Netherlands) Twente	Lisbon, Portugal
20:45	Witsel 46', 66'; Luisão 59'	Report	Ruiz 85'	Stadium: Estádio da Luz; Attendance: 48,353; Referee: Felix Brych (Germany)

==== Group stage ====
Group C
Team	Pld	W	D	L	GF	GA	GD	Pts
(Portugal) Benfica	6	3	3	0	8	4	+4	12
(Switzerland) Basel	6	3	2	1	11	10	+1	11
(England) Manchester United	6	2	3	1	11	8	+3	9
(Romania) Oțelul Galați	6	0	0	6	3	11	−8	0

14 September 2011 1	Benfica (Portugal)	1–1	(England) Manchester United	Lisbon, Portugal
20:45	Cardozo 24'	Report	Giggs 42'	Stadium: Estádio da Luz; Attendance: 63,822; Referee: Damir Skomina (Slovenia)

27 September 2011 2	Oțelul Galați (Romania)	0–1	(Portugal) Benfica	Bucharest, Romania^{1}
20:45		Report	Bruno César 40'	Stadium: Stadionul Național; Attendance: 6,824; Referee: David Fernández Borbalán (Spain)

18 October 2011 3	Basel (Switzerland)	0–2	(Portugal) Benfica	Basel, Switzerland
20:45		Report	Bruno César 20'; Cardozo 75'	Stadium: St. Jakob-Park; Attendance: 35,831; Referee: Viktor Kassai (Hungary)

2 November 2011 4	Benfica (Portugal)	1–1	(Switzerland) Basel	Lisbon, Portugal
20:45	Rodrigo 4'	Report	Huggel 64'	Stadium: Estádio da Luz; Attendance: 39,270; Referee: Carlos Velasco Carballo (Spain)

22 November 2011 5	Manchester United (England)	2–2	(Portugal) Benfica	Manchester, England
20:45	Berbatov 30'; Fletcher 59'	Report	Jones 3' (o.g.); Aimar 61'	Stadium: Old Trafford; Attendance: 74,873; Referee: Cüneyt Çakır (Turkey)

7 December 2011 6	Benfica (Portugal)	1–0	(Romania) Oțelul Galați	Lisbon, Portugal
20:45	Cardozo 7'	Report		Stadium: Estádio da Luz; Attendance: 35,155; Referee: Manuel Gräfe (Germany)

==== Knockout phase ====
===== Round of 16 =====
15 February 2012 First leg	Zenit St. Petersburg (Russia)	3–2	(Portugal) Benfica	Saint Petersburg, Russia
18:00	Shirokov 27', 88'; Semak 71'	Report	Pereira 21'; Cardozo 87'	Stadium: Petrovsky Stadium; Attendance: 18,200; Referee: Jonas Eriksson (Sweden)

6 March 2012 Second leg	Benfica (Portugal)	2–0 (4–3 agg.)	(Russia) Zenit St. Petersburg	Lisbon, Portugal
20:45	Pereira 45+1'; Oliveira 90+3'	Report		Stadium: Estádio da Luz; Attendance: 48,909; Referee: Howard Webb (England)

===== Quarter-finals =====
27 March 2012 First leg	Benfica (Portugal)	0–1	(England) Chelsea	Lisbon, Portugal
19:45 GMT	Bruno César (yellow card) 26'; Luisão (yellow card) 67'; García (yellow card) 75'	Report	Meireles (yellow card) 18'; Kalou 75'	Stadium: Estádio da Luz; Attendance: 60,000; Referee: Paolo Tagliavento (Italy)

4 April 2012 Second leg	Chelsea (England)	2–1 (3–1 agg.)	(Portugal) Benfica	London, England
19:45 GMT	Lampard 21' (pen.); Ivanović (yellow card) 38'; Ramires (yellow card) 44'; Mikel (yellow card) 79'; Meireles 90+2'	Report	Cardozo (yellow card) 19'; Bruno César (yellow card) 20'; Pereira (yellow card) 20' (yellow-red card) 40'; Aimar (yellow card) 27'; García 85'	Stadium: Stamford Bridge; Attendance: 37,264; Referee: Damir Skomina (Slovakia)

=== Overall record ===
Competition	First match	Last match	Record								
Competition	First match	Last match	G	W	D	L	GF	GA	GD	Win %	Source
Primeira Liga	12 August 2011	12 May 2012	30	21	6	3	66	27	+39	70.00	
Taça de Portugal	14 October 2011	2 December 2011	3	2	0	1	4	2	+2	66.67	
Taça da Liga	3 January 2012	14 April 2012	5	5	0	0	14	4	+10	100.00	
UEFA Champions League	27 July 2011	4 April 2012	14	6	5	3	21	14	+7	42.86	
Total			52	34	11	7	105	47	+58	65.38	

== Player statistics ==
No.	Pos	Nat	Player	Total		Primeira Liga		Portuguese Cup		League Cup		Champions League	
No.	Pos	Nat	Player	Apps	Goals	Apps	Goals	Apps	Goals	Apps	Goals	Apps	Goals
Goalkeepers
1	GK	(Brazil) BRA	Artur	47	-43	29	-26	0	0	4	-3	14	-14
39	GK	(Portugal) POR	Mika	0	0	0	0	0	0	0	0	0	0
47	GK	(Portugal) POR	Eduardo	9	-7	1	-1	3	-2	5	-4	0	0
Defenders
14	DF	(Uruguay) URU	Maxi Pereira	43	3	25	0	1	0	4	1	13	2
22	DF	(Portugal) POR	André Almeida	4	0	3	0	0	0	1	0	0	0
4	DF	(Brazil) BRA	Luisão	41	2	25	1	2	0	2	0	12	1
33	DF	(Brazil) BRA	Jardel	18	0	10	0	1	0	4	0	3	0
24	DF	(Argentina) ARG	Ezequiel Garay	41	2	24	2	3	0	3	0	11	0
27	DF	(Portugal) POR	Miguel Vítor	10	0	3	0	2	0	1	0	4	0
38	DF	(Spain) ESP	Joan Capdevila	12	0	5	0	2	0	4	0	1	0
3	DF	(Brazil) BRA	Emerson	39	0	24	0	1	0	1	0	13	0
36	DF	(Portugal) POR	Luís Martins	5	0	4	0	0	0	0	0	1	0
Midfielders
6	MF	(Spain) ESP	Javi García	39	2	22	1	1	0	4	0	12	1
21	DF	(Serbia) SRB	Nemanja Matić	30	1	16	1	2	0	2	0	10	0
5	MF	(Portugal) POR	Ruben Amorim	14	0	6	0	2	0	0	0	6	0
10	MF	(Argentina) ARG	Pablo Aimar	42	3	24	2	2	0	4	0	12	1
28	MF	(Belgium) BEL	Axel Witsel	49	5	29	1	2	0	4	2	14	2
35	MF	(Argentina) ARG	Enzo Pérez	4	0	3	0	0	0	0	0	1	0
26	FW	(Portugal) POR	David Simão	2	0	0	0	2	0	0	0	0	0
37	MF	(Portugal) POR	Rúben Pinto	0	0	0	0	0	0	0	0	0	0
8	MF	(Brazil) BRA	Bruno César	44	13	26	10	2	1	4	0	12	2
12	FW	(Portugal) POR	Yannick Djaló	5	0	3	0	0	0	1	0	1	0
20	MF	(Argentina) ARG	Nicolás Gaitán	44	4	25	3	1	0	4	0	14	1
9	MF	(Spain) ESP	Nolito	48	15	29	11	3	0	4	1	12	3
Strikers
7	FW	(Paraguay) PAR	Óscar Cardozo	45	28	29	20	0	0	4	3	12	5
11	FW	(Argentina) ARG	Franco Jara	2	0	1	0	0	0	0	0	1	0
16	FW	(Portugal) POR	Nélson Oliveira	22	3	12	0	3	0	5	2	2	1
19	FW	(Spain) ESP	Rodrigo	38	16	22	9	3	2	4	4	9	1
30	FW	(Argentina) ARG	Javier Saviola	31	6	18	4	2	1	5	1	6	0
22	FW	(Uruguay) URU	Rodrigo Mora	3	0	1	0	2	0	0	0	0	0

== Transfers ==
=== In ===
==== Summer ====
No.	Pos.	Name	Age	Moving From	Type of Transfer	Contract Ends	Transfer fee	Source	Notes
1	GK	(Brazil) Artur	30	(Portugal) Braga	Transfer	2016	€200,000	N/A	
28	MF	(Belgium) Axel Witsel	22	(Belgium) Standard Liège	Transfer	2017	€6,500,000	N/A	
24	DF	(Argentina) Ezequiel Garay	24	(Spain) Real Madrid	Transfer	2016	€5,500,000	N/A	
8	MF	(Brazil) Bruno César	22	(Brazil) Corinthians	Transfer	2016	€5,300,000	N/A	
21	MF	(Serbia) Nemanja Matić	22	(England) Chelsea	Transfer	2016	€7,614,350	N/A	Transfer of David Luiz
35	MF	(Argentina) Enzo Pérez	25	(Argentina) Estudiantes La Plata	Transfer	2016	€5,500,000	N/A	
3	DF	(Brazil) Emerson	25	(France) Lille	Transfer	2015	€2,000,000	N/A	
38	DF	(Spain) Joan Capdevila	33	(Spain) Villarreal	Transfer	2013	€1,000,000	N/A	
39	GK	(Portugal) Mika	20	(Portugal) União de Leiria	Transfer	2016	€500,000	N/A	
#	DF	(Paraguay) Lorenzo Melgarejo	20	(Paraguay) Independiente FBC	Transfer	2015	€750,000	N/A	
9	MF	(Spain) Nolito	24	(Spain) Barcelona B	Transfer	2016	Free	N/A	
34	DF	(Portugal) André Almeida	20	(Portugal) Belenenses	Transfer	2016	€1,100,000	N/A	
22	FW	(Uruguay) Rodrigo Mora	23	(Uruguay) Defensor	Transfer	2015	€780,000	N/A	
47	GK	(Portugal) Eduardo	28	(Italy) Genoa	Loan	2012	Free	N/A	
#	MF	(Portugal) Nuno Coelho	23	(Portugal) Académica de Coimbra	Transfer	2014	€100,000	N/A	
#	DF	(Denmark) Daniel Wass	22	(Denmark) Brøndby	Transfer	2015	Free	N/A	
36	DF	(Portugal) Luís Martins	19	(Portugal) Benfica U19	Promoted	2016	Free	N/A	
37	MF	(Portugal) Rúben Pinto	19	(Portugal) Benfica U19	Promoted	2015	Free	N/A	
26	MF	(Portugal) David Simão	21	(Portugal) Paços Ferreira	Loan return	2015	Free	N/A	
#	DF	(Ivory Coast) Marco Zoro	27	(Romania) Universitatea Craiova	Loan return	2012	Free	N/A	
#	DF	(Argentina) José Shaffer	24	(Argentina) Banfield	Loan return	2013	Free	N/A	
#	FW	(Uruguay) Jonathan Urretavizcaya	21	(Uruguay) Peñarol	Loan return	2013	Free	N/A	
#	FW	(United States) Freddy Adu	22	(Turkey) Çaykur Rizespor	Loan return	2012	Free	N/A	
#	FW	(Equatorial Guinea) Javier Balboa	26	(Spain) Albacete	Loan Return	2012	Free	N/A	
#	FW	(Brazil) Marcel	29	(Brazil) Vasco da Gama	Loan return	2011	Free	N/A	
#	FW	(Ghana) Ishmael Yartey	21	(Portugal) Beira-Mar	Loan return	2013	Free	N/A	
#	GK	(Slovenia) Jan Oblak	18	(Portugal) Olhanense	Loan return	2015	Free	N/A	
3	DF	(Portugal) Fábio Faria	22	(Spain) Real Valladolid	Loan return	2014	Free	N/A	
#	DF	(Portugal) Abel Pereira	22	(Portugal) Gondomar	Loan return	2013	Free		
#	FW	(Portugal) Evandro Brandão	20	(Portugal) Gondomar	Loan return	2013	Free	N/A	
#	FW	(Portugal) Hélio Vaz	20	(Portugal) Casa Pia	Loan return	2012	Free		
#	DF	(Algeria) Hassan Yebda	27	(Italy) Napoli	Loan Return	2013	Free	N/A	
#	FW	(Spain) Rodrigo	20	(England) Bolton Wanderers	Loan return	2016	Free	N/A	
#	FW	(Portugal) Nélson Oliveira	19	(Portugal) Paços Ferreira	Loan return	2018	Free	N/A	
#	FW	(Portugal) José Coelho	21	(Portugal) Fátima	Loan return	2012	Free	N/A	
#	FW	(Portugal) Ivan Santos	22	(Portugal) Espinho	Loan return	2012	Free	N/A	
#	FW	(Portugal) André Carvalhas	22	(Portugal) Fátima	Loan return	2012	Free	N/A	
#	MF	(Portugal) Miguel Rosa	22	(Portugal) Belenenses	Loan return	2015	Free	N/A	
#	MF	(Portugal) Lassana Camará	19	(Switzerland) Servette	Loan Return	2013	Free	N/A	
#	FW	(Portugal) André Soares	21	(Switzerland) Servette	Loan return	2013	Free	N/A	
#	MF	(Portugal) Leandro Pimenta	20	(Portugal) Fátima	Loan return	2013	Free	N/A	
#	DF	(Portugal) Mário Rui	20	(Portugal) Fátima	Loan return	2013	Free	N/A	
#	DF	(Portugal) Miguel Vítor	22	(England) Leicester City	Loan return	2012	Free	N/A	
#	DF	(Portugal) Jorge Ribeiro	29	(Portugal) Vitória de Guimarães	Loan return	2012	Free	N/A	

==== Winter ====
No.	Pos.	Name	Age	Moving From	Type of Transfer	Contract Ends	Transfer fee	Notes	Source
12	MF	(Portugal) Yannick Djaló	25	-	Transfer	2015	€250,000		
34	DF	(Portugal) André Almeida	21	(Portugal) União de Leiria	Loan return	2015	Free	N/A	

Spend : ▼€27,050,000

=== Out ===
==== Summer ====
No.	Pos.	Name	Age	Moving to	Type of transfer	Transfer fee	Source
18	DF	(Portugal) Fábio Coentrão	23	(Spain) Real Madrid	Transfer	€30,000,000	N/A
12	GK	(Spain) Roberto	25	(Spain) Real Zaragoza	Transfer	€8,600,000	CMVM
1	GK	(Portugal) José Moreira	29	(England) Swansea City	Transfer	€850,000	N/A
21	FW	(Portugal) Nuno Gomes	34	(Portugal) Braga	Transfer	Free	N/A
22	DF	(Portugal) Luís Filipe	32	(Portugal) Olhanense	Transfer	Free	N/A
#	DF	(Ivory Coast) Marco Zoro	27	-	Contract Terminated	Free	N/A
#	FW	(United States) Freddy Adu	22	(United States) Philadelphia Union	Transfer	Free	N/A
#	FW	(Brazil) Marcel	29	(South Korea) Suwon Bluewings	Transfer	Free	N/A
#	FW	(Brazil) Weldon	30	(Romania) CFR Cluj	Transfer	Free	N/A
#	DF	(Portugal) Abel Pereira	22	(Cyprus) Doxa	Transfer	Free	N/A
#	FW	(Portugal) Evandro Brandão	20	(Hungary) Videoton	Transfer	Free	N/A
#	DF	(Algeria) Hassan Yebda	27	(Spain) Granada	Transfer	Free	N/A
#	DF	(Portugal) Jorge Ribeiro	29	(Spain) Granada	Transfer	Free	N/A
#	FW	(Portugal) Ivan Santos	22	(Portugal) Oliveirense	Transfer	Free	N/A
#	FW	(Portugal) André Carvalhas	22	(Portugal) Trofense	Transfer	Free	N/A
#	MF	(Portugal) Lassana Camará	19	(Spain) Real Valladolid	Transfer	Free	N/A
#	FW	(Portugal) André Soares	21	(Portugal) Marítimo B	Transfer	Free	N/A
#	DF	(Portugal) Mário Rui	20	(Italy) Parma	Transfer	Free	N/A
#	FW	(Equatorial Guinea) Javier Balboa	26	(Portugal) Beira-Mar	Transfer	Free	N/A
24	DF	(France) Lionel Carole	20	(France) Sedan	Loan	Free	N/A
#	DF	(Denmark) Daniel Wass	22	(France) Evian	Loan	Free	N/A
#	MF	(Argentina) José Luis Fernández	23	(Argentina) Estudiantes La Plata	Loan	Free	N/A
#	DF	(Paraguay) Lorenzo Melgarejo	20	(Portugal) Paços de Ferreira	Loan	Free	N/A
#	DF	(Portugal) Fábio Faria	22	(Portugal) Paços de Ferreira	Loan	Free	N/A
#	MF	(Portugal) Nuno Coelho	23	(Portugal) Beira-Mar	Loan	Free	N/A
34	DF	(Portugal) André Almeida	20	(Portugal) União de Leiria	Loan	Free	N/A
#	DF	(Argentina) José Shaffer	24	(Portugal) União de Leiria	Loan	Free	N/A
#	MF	(Brazil) Elvis	20	(Portugal) Leiria	Loan	Free	N/A
#	GK	(Slovenia) Jan Oblak	18	(Portugal) Leiria	Loan	Free	N/A
#	FW	(Uruguay) Jonathan Urretaviscaya	21	(Portugal) Vitória de Guimarães	Loan	Free	N/A
#	FW	(Portugal) Hélio Vaz	20	(Portugal) Atlético CP	Loan	Free	N/A
#	FW	(Portugal) José Coelho	21	(Portugal) Atlético CP	Loan	Free	N/A
#	MF	(Portugal) Leandro Pimenta	20	(Portugal) Atlético CP	Loan	Free	N/A
#	MF	(Portugal) Miguel Rosa	22	(Portugal) Belenenses	Loan	Free	N/A
#	FW	(Argentina) Franco Jara	22	(Spain) Granada	Loan	€400,000	N/A
#	MF	(Portugal) Carlos Martins	29	(Spain) Granada	Loan	€500,000	N/A
#	GK	(Brazil) Júlio César	24	(Spain) Granada	Loan	Free	N/A
#	DF	(Brazil) Sidnei	21	(Turkey) Beşiktaş	Loan	€200,000	N/A
#	MF	(Brazil) Airton	21	(Brazil) Flamengo	Loan	€300,000	N/A
#	FW	(Brazil) Alan Kardec	22	(Brazil) Santos	Loan	Free	N/A
#	FW	(Ghana) Ishmael Yartey	21	(Switzerland) Servette	Loan	Free	N/A
#	DF	(Portugal) Roderick	20	(Switzerland) Servette	Loan	Free	N/A
#	MF	(Argentina) Eduardo Salvio	20	(Spain) Atlético Madrid	Loan Return	Free	N/A

==== Winter ====
No.	Pos.	Name	Age	Moving to	Type of transfer	Transfer fee	Source
25	DF	(Portugal) César Peixoto	31	(Portugal) Gil Vicente	Transfer	Free	N/A
#	FW	(Portugal) José Coelho	21	(Moldova) Sheriff Tiraspol	Transfer	Free	N/A
5	MF	(Portugal) Ruben Amorim	26	(Portugal) Braga	Loan	Free	N/A
35	MF	(Argentina) Enzo Pérez	25	(Argentina) Estudiantes La Plata	Loan	€300,000	N/A
22	FW	(Uruguay) Rodrigo Mora	24	(Uruguay) Peñarol	Loan	Free	N/A
26	MF	(Portugal) David Simão	21	(Portugal) Académica de Coimbra	Loan	Free	N/A
#	DF	(Portugal) Fábio Faria	22	(Portugal) Rio Ave	Loan	Free	N/A

Transfer income: ▲€41,150,000

=== Overall transfer activity ===
==== Spending ====
Summer: ▼€27,050,000
Winter: €0,000,000
Total: ▼€27,050,000

==== Income ====
Summer: ▲€40,850,000
Winter: ▲€300,000
Total: ▲€41,150,000

==== Expenditure ====
Summer: ▲€13,800,000
Winter: ▲€300,000
Total: ▲€14,100,000
