= List of S.L. Benfica honours =

Sport Lisboa e Benfica, commonly known as Benfica, is a Portuguese professional football team based in Lisbon. The club was founded on 28 February 1904 as Sport Lisboa and later absorbed Grupo Sport Benfica to form Sport Lisboa e Benfica.

In terms of overall major trophies won, Benfica is the most decorated team in Portugal. At regional level, Benfica won 10 Campeonato de Lisboa and a record 18 Taça de Honra. Nationally, they have won a record 38 Primeira Liga titles, a record 26 Taça de Portugal, a record 8 Taça da Liga, 10 Supertaça Cândido de Oliveira, 3 Campeonato de Portugal, and a shared record 3 Taça Ribeiro dos Reis. In international football, Benfica won the Latin Cup in 1950 and back-to-back European Cups in 1961 and 1962.

In addition to the aforementioned honours, the following list includes trophies in other competitions, Portuguese orders and medals, and other awards pertaining to the club.

== Regional titles (28) ==
- Campeonato de Lisboa

Winners (10): 1909–10, 1911–12, 1912–13, 1913–14, 1915–16, 1916–17, 1917–18, 1919–20, 1932–33, 1939–40

- Taça de Honra

Winners (18) – record: 1919–20, 1921–22, 1962–63, 1964–65, 1966–67, 1967–68, 1968–69, 1971–72, 1972–73, 1973–74, 1974–75, 1977–78, 1978–79, 1979–80, 1981–82, 1983–84, 1985–86, 1987–88

== National titles (88) ==
- Primeira Liga

Winners (38) – record: 1935–36, 1936–37, 1937–38, 1941–42, 1942–43, 1944–45, 1949–50, 1954–55, 1956–57, 1959–60, 1960–61, 1962–63, 1963–64, 1964–65, 1966–67, 1967–68, 1968–69, 1970–71, 1971–72, 1972–73, 1974–75, 1975–76, 1976–77, 1980–81, 1982–83, 1983–84, 1986–87, 1988–89, 1990–91, 1993–94, 2004–05, 2009–10, 2013–14, 2014–15, 2015–16, 2016–17, 2018–19, 2022–23

- Taça de Portugal

Winners (26) – record: 1939–40, 1942–43, 1943–44, 1948–49, 1950–51, 1951–52, 1952–53, 1954–55, 1956–57, 1958–59, 1961–62, 1963–64, 1968–69, 1969–70, 1971–72, 1979–80, 1980–81, 1982–83, 1984–85, 1985–86, 1986–87, 1992–93, 1995–96, 2003–04, 2013–14, 2016–17

- Taça da Liga

Winners (8) – record: 2008–09, 2009–10, 2010–11, 2011–12, 2013–14, 2014–15, 2015–16, 2024–25

- Supertaça Cândido de Oliveira

Winners (10): 1980, 1985, 1989, 2005, 2014, 2016, 2017, 2019, 2023, 2025

- Campeonato de Portugal

Winners (3): 1929–30, 1930–31, 1934–35

- Taça Ribeiro dos Reis

Winners (3) – shared record: 1963–64, 1965–66, 1970–71

== International titles (3) ==
- European Cup / UEFA Champions League

Winners (2): 1960–61, 1961–62

- Latin Cup

Winners (1): 1950

== Other competitions ==
- National Olympic Games: 1910, 1912, 1913
- Empire Cup: 1912, 1913, 1918
- Three Cities Trophy (Lisbon, Porto, Vigo): 1913
- Four Cities Trophy (Lisbon, Porto, Madrid, Lausanne): 1915–16
- Easter Trophy (Lisbon): 1924–25
- Ramón de Carranza Trophy: 1963, 1971
- Press Gold Cup: 1964
- Small Club World Cup: 1965
- Badajoz Trophy: 1968–69, 1972–73
- Salamanca Trophy: 1972–73
- Porto Wine Trophy: 1972–73
- Los Angeles Trophy: 1974–75
- Belo Horizonte Trophy: 1974–75
- Braga Trophy: 1976–77
- Tournoi de Paris: 1979
- FC Schalke 04 Trophy (Gelsenkirchen): 1979–80
- Toronto Trophy: 1980–81, 1981–82, 1982–83, 1986–87
- Iberian Cup: 1983
- Lisbon Trophy: 1983–84, 1985–86, 1986–87
- Maputo Trophy: 1985–86
- Teresa Herrera Trophy: 1987
- Trofeo Cidade de Vigo: 1989
- Pepsi Cup: 1992, 1993
- Memoriale Cecchi Gori: 1996
- Middlesbrough Trophy: 1998
- Coppa Nereo Rocco: 1999
- Friendship Cup: 1999, 2001
- Superbola Trophy: 2002
- Guadiana Trophy / Algarve Football Cup / Algarve Trophy: 2002, 2007, 2009, 2010, 2011, 2016, 2017, 2022, 2023
- Dubai Cup: 2007
- Cidade de Guimarães Trophy: 2008, 2009, 2010
- Amsterdam Tournament: 2009
- Eusébio Cup: 2009, 2011, 2012, 2022, 2024, 2025
- Pedro Pauleta Trophy: 2009
- CNE Cup: 2009
- Albufeira Summer Cup: 2010
- Festa d'Elx Trophy: 2013
- Sado International Tournament: 2018
- Hospital da Luz Cup: 2019
- International Champions Cup: 2019

== Orders, medals, awards ==
- Commander of the Military Order of Christ (1932)
- Officer of the Order of Merit (1936)
- Medal of the Order of Prince Henry (1979)
- Medal of Sports Merit (1954)
- Medal of Honour of Sports Merit (1981)
- Collar of Honour of Sports Merit (1988)
- France Football European Team of the Year: 1968
- kicker Sportmagazin 7th Greatest Club of the 20th Century (1998)
- 12th in FIFA Club of the Century (2000)
- 9th in IFFHS Top 200 European clubs of the 20th century (2009)
- Globe Soccer Awards Best Club Academy: 2015, 2019
- Globe Soccer Awards Best Youth Team of the Year: 2022

== See also ==
- List of S.L. Benfica records and statistics
