= Ivan Santos =

Ivan Santos may refer to

- Ivan Santos (footballer, born 1988), Portuguese footballer
- Ivan Santos (footballer, born 1982), Brazilian footballer
- Ivan Santos (athlete), Santomean pole vaulter
- Ivan Santos (musician), Brazilian guitar player and singer
