= Javier Saviola =

Argentine footballer (born 1981)

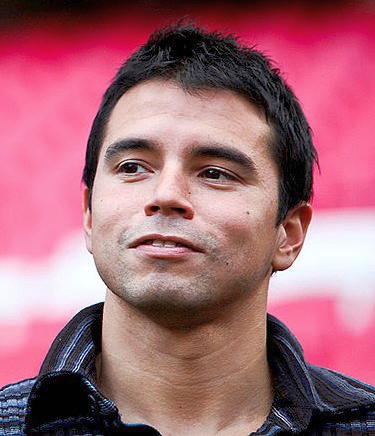
- Saviola during his presentation as a Benfica player, 2009

Personal information
- Full name: Javier Pedro Saviola Fernández
- Date of birth: 11 December 1981 (age 44)
- Place of birth: Buenos Aires, Argentina
- Height: 1.68 m (5 ft 6 in)
- Position: Forward

Team information
- Current team: Barcelona U19 (assistant); Encamp (futsal)

Youth career
- Parque Chas
- 1996–1998: River Plate

Senior career*
Years	Team	Apps	(Gls)
1998–2001	River Plate	86	(45)
2001–2007	Barcelona	123	(49)
2004–2005	→ Monaco (loan)	29	(7)
2005–2006	→ Sevilla (loan)	29	(9)
2007–2009	Real Madrid	17	(4)
2009–2012	Benfica	69	(24)
2012–2013	Málaga	27	(8)
2013–2014	Olympiacos	26	(12)
2014–2015	Verona	15	(1)
2015–2016	River Plate	14	(0)
Total		434	(159)

International career
2000–2001	Argentina U20	7	(11)
2000–2007	Argentina	39	(11)

Managerial career
- 2016–2022: Ordino (assistant)
- 2022–: Barcelona U19 (assistant)
Medal record
Men's football
Representing Argentina
Olympic Games
Gold medal – first place	2004 Athens
FIFA U-20 World Cup
Winner	2001 Argentina
Copa América
Runner-up	2004 Peru
FIFA Confederations Cup
Runner-up	2005 Germany
- * Club domestic league appearances and goals

Javier Pedro Saviola Fernández (Spanish pronunciation: [xaˈβjeɾ ˈpeðɾo saˈβjola feɾˈnandes]; born 11 December 1981), better known as El Conejo (The Rabbit), is an Argentine former professional footballer who played as a forward. Saviola was renowned for his speed, agility, and goal-scoring ability, which made him a standout player throughout his football career. Since retiring, he has been involved in various roles within the world of football, including advisory work and developing young talent as a coach at Barcelona U19.

He was trained in River Plate's academy and made his debut for the club in 1998. He spent much of his career in Spain, representing both Barcelona and Real Madrid, as well as having spells with Málaga and Sevilla. He played 196 games and scored 70 goals over the course of eight seasons in La Liga. He also had spells with Monaco, Benfica, Olympiacos, and Verona. He finished his playing career at River Plate in 2016. Saviola won league titles in Argentina, Spain, Portugal and Greece, as well as the UEFA Cup with Sevilla. He was the youngest player on Pelé's FIFA 100 list of the 125 greatest living footballers in 2004.

An Argentine international for seven years, he made his debut in 2000, representing his country at the 2006 World Cup, as well as the 2004 Copa América, where Argentina reached the final. He also won a gold medal with Argentina at the 2004 Olympics in Athens.

== Club career ==
=== River Plate ===
Born in Buenos Aires, Saviola made his debut for River Plate at the age of 16, and went on to be a prolific goalscorer for the club.

He helped River to the 1999 Apertura and 2000 Clausura championships, and earned the 1999 South American Footballer of the Year award. Still only 18, he gained a reputation as a phenomenal prospect, and was even regarded as a potential heir to Diego Maradona, in particular after he broke the latter's 1978 record by becoming the youngest player to win the Golden Boot award.

=== Barcelona ===
In 2001, aged 19, Saviola moved abroad to play for Barcelona in a £15 million transfer. He obtained Spanish citizenship shortly after, thereby not being restricted by the Spanish league maximum on the number of non-European Union citizens allowed in each team; under coach Carles Rexach, he scored 17 goals in his first season, finishing joint-fourth top scorer in La Liga.

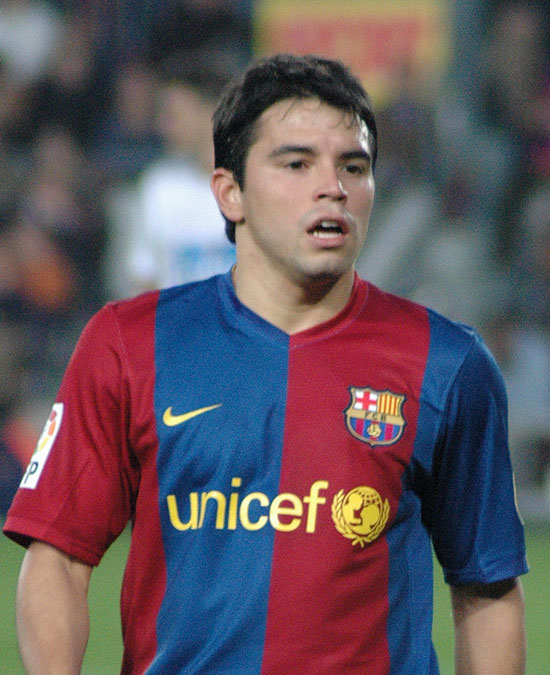
Saviola with Barcelona in 2007

Saviola's second year at the Camp Nou did not start well, as he only scored two goals in the first half of the season. Radomir Antić became the new coach after Louis van Gaal was fired, and he went on to net eleven goals in the latter half of the campaign; Frank Rijkaard was subsequently appointed as new manager for 2003–04, and the player scored 14 times in the league alone, but was deemed surplus at the club as was longtime attacking partner Patrick Kluivert.

Saviola was sent on loan in the summer of 2004, moving to Monaco in Ligue 1. As he did not fit into Rijkaard's plans, he was again loaned out the following year, this time to Sevilla who were seeking to replace Real Madrid-bound Júlio Baptista; with the Andalusians he won his first title in Europe, conquering the UEFA Cup — he also scored nine times in the league, good enough for fifth.

Saviola returned to Barcelona for 2006–07, playing in 18 league games, six as a starter, and netting five goals. He benefited greatly from injuries to teammates, most notably to Samuel Eto'o, and added five in as many matches in that season's Copa del Rey, notably a hat-trick against Alavés (3–2 win at home, 5–2 aggregate).

=== Real Madrid ===
On 10 July 2007, Real Madrid signed Saviola after his Barcelona contract expired, on a three-year deal. Although on a financially lucrative contract, he endured a difficult time at Real, being mainly restricted to cup matches and sporadic appearances (mainly as a substitute) in the league and the UEFA Champions League.

The arrival of Klaas-Jan Huntelaar limited Saviola's opportunities even more, and he finished his Real Madrid spell with five goals in 28 overall appearances.

=== Benfica ===
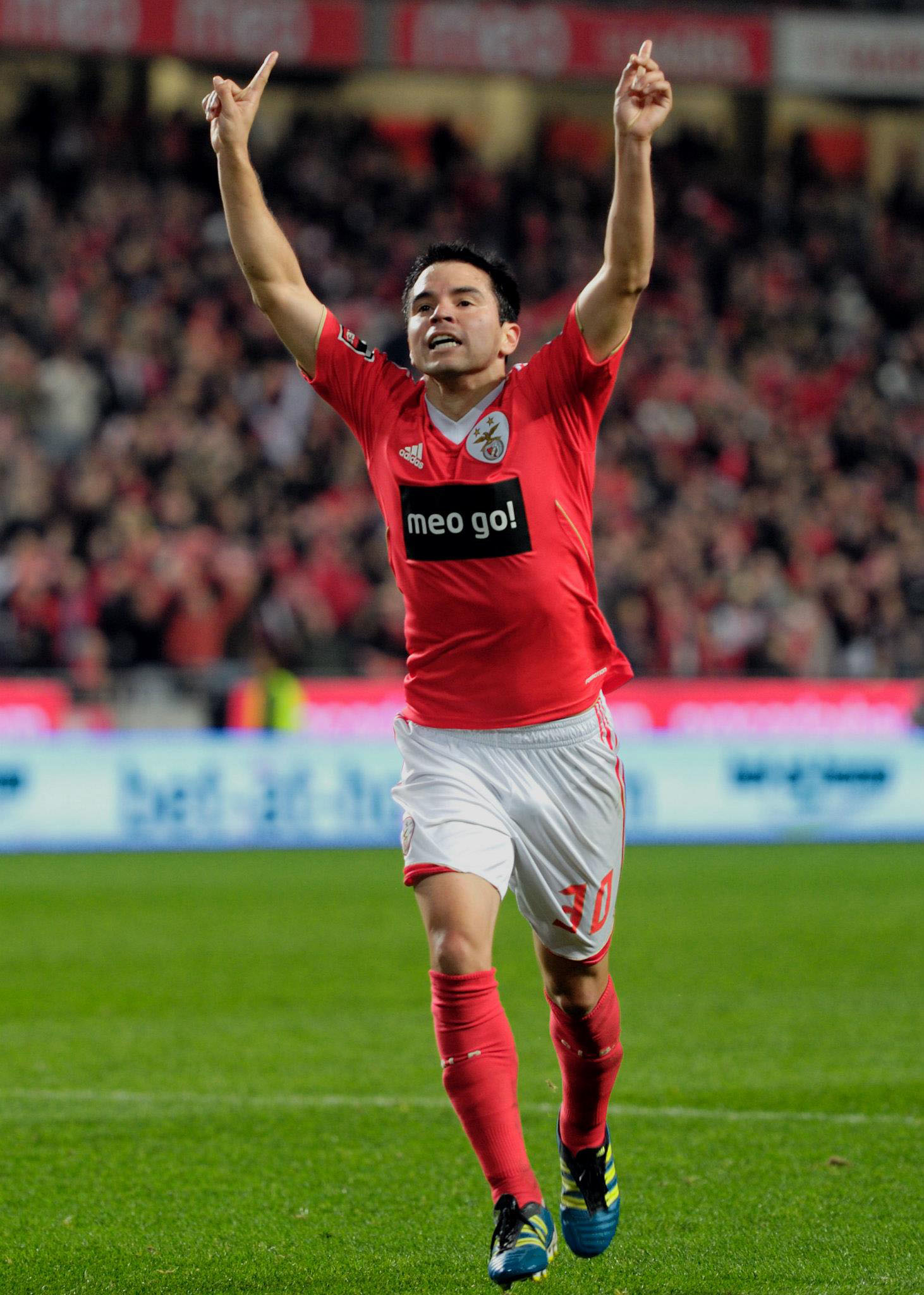
Saviola celebrating a goal for Benfica, 2011

On 26 June 2009, Benfica and Real Madrid agreed on a €5 million deal that would see Saviola play in Portugal for the next three years, with an option for one more; a €30 million clause was added. On 16 July, he scored two goals to send his team into the Guadiana Trophy finals after defeating Athletic Bilbao.

Saviola netted twice on 22 October 2009, guiding his side to a 5–0 victory over Everton for the UEFA Europa League (he would also score in their 2–0 win in Liverpool in the second match), adding another brace four days later in a 6–1 routing of C.D. Nacional for the Primeira Liga.

On 6 December 2009, Saviola scored through a chip shot against Académica de Coimbra in a 4–0 home win. On 20 December, he netted the game's only goal as Benfica defeated rivals Porto at home; during the victorious campaign, he formed a deadly attacking partnership with Paraguayan Óscar Cardozo, with the pair combining for more than 50 goals overall.

On 3 January 2010, shortly before receiving the SJPF Player of the Month award, Saviola scored another winning goal against Nacional, now for the Taça da Liga, again being the game's only scorer in an away defeat of Rio Ave, netting in the 48th minute. He scored his 19th goal overall in a 3–1 home triumph against Paços de Ferreira on 7 March, and the Lisbon club was eventually crowned league champions

=== Málaga ===
In the last hours of the 2012–13 summer transfer window, Saviola agreed on a move to Málaga. He played 45 minutes in his first appearance, a 1–0 win at Real Zaragoza on 1 September.

On 15 September 2012, Saviola scored once and provided one assist in a 3−1 home win against Levante. He continued with his streak the following game, Málaga's first-ever in the Champions League group stage, netting in a 3–0 home win over Zenit Saint Petersburg.

=== Olympiacos ===
On 25 July 2013, Saviola signed a two-year contract with Greek champions Olympiacos. He scored his first goal in the Super League on 25 August, coming on at half-time and helping his team come from behind to win 2–1 at home to Atromitos On 10 December, he netted a brace – and also missed a penalty – in a 3–1 success over Anderlecht also at the Karaiskakis Stadium in the group stage's last round, which helped the Piraeus team finish second and qualify at the expense of former side Benfica.

=== Verona ===
On 2 September 2014, Saviola joined Serie A club Hellas Verona. He made his official debut on 22 September, starting in a 2–2 home draw against Genoa, and scored his first goal on 2 December, netting the only in a home win over Perugia for the Coppa Italia. His sole goal of the league season came on 25 January 2015, the only one in a home victory over Atalanta.

=== Return to River ===
On 30 June 2015, River Plate announced that Saviola had returned to the club. He left in January of the following year, after failing to find the net in his second spell, and subsequently retired from professional football at the age of 34.

=== Retirement, coaching and futsal career ===
Shortly after retiring, Saviola settled in Andorra with his family and joined FC Ordino as an assistant coach in the Primera Divisió.

In February 2018 he signed for local futsal side Encamp. In April 2018 he won the Andorran futsal league with Encamp.

== International career ==
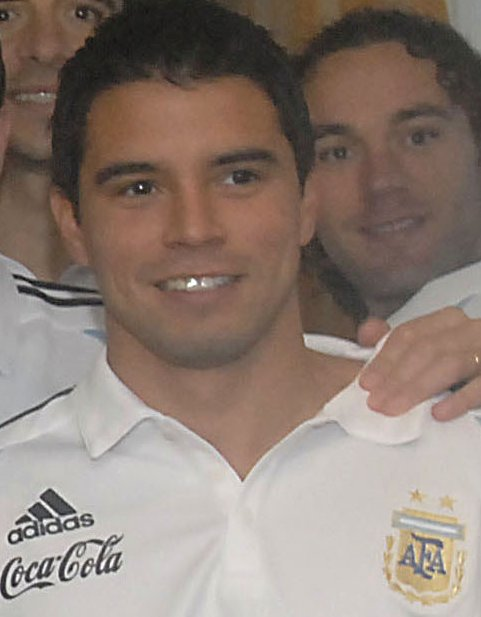
Saviola in the Argentina national team, 2007

Saviola starred in the 2001 edition of the FIFA U-20 World Cup, held in Argentina. He was top scorer and was voted player of the tournament, as the national team won the competition; with 11 goals in seven games, he became the record goal-scorer in the tournament's history. He scored the second goal in the victory 3–0 over Ghana in the final.

Three years later, Saviola played in the 2004 Olympic Games and won the gold medal. Under coach Marcelo Bielsa he was given few playing opportunities for the senior team but, after the former's resignation in 2004, new manager José Pékerman, who also worked with him at youth level, turned the tide in the player's favour; he was also a member of the squads that reached final of the 2004 Copa América and the 2005 FIFA Confederations Cup, netting three times in the former tournament and one in the latter.

Saviola was called up to represent Argentina at the 2006 World Cup – Luciano Figueroa and Luciano Galletti were also in contention for a place on the roster, but his excellent form for Sevilla secured his place in the squad. He scored against Ivory Coast in the country's opening game, and made two assists in the 6–0 victory over Serbia and Montenegro also in the group phase.

Saviola retired from international football on 5 December 2009, although not yet 28. He stated that he felt his career as an Argentina player had come to an end, and that he wanted to concentrate on club football.

== Style of play ==
Saviola was known for his speed, agility, dribbling and ability to score from almost any attacking position on the field. A diminutive, talented, and prolific forward, with a slender build, he was capable of playing as a striker, in a more creative role as a second striker, or even in a playmaking role as an attacking midfielder. Throughout his career, Saviola was nicknamed El Conejo (The Rabbit, in Spanish), due to his appearance, and also El Pibito (The Little Kid, in Spanish), a reference to compatriot Diego Maradona, who was nicknamed El Pibe de Oro (The Golden Kid, in Spanish), and to whom Saviola was often compared in his youth.

== Media ==
Saviola was sponsored by sportswear company Nike, and appeared in commercials for the brand. In a global advertising campaign in the run-up to the 2002 World Cup in Korea and Japan, he starred in a "Secret Tournament" commercial (branded "Scopion KO") directed by Terry Gilliam, appearing alongside footballers such as Luís Figo, Thierry Henry, Hidetoshi Nakata, Roberto Carlos, Ronaldinho, Ronaldo and Francesco Totti, with former player Eric Cantona the tournament "referee".

== Career statistics ==
=== Club ===
Appearances and goals by club, season and competition
Club	Season	League			National cup		League cup		Continental		Total	
Club	Season	Division	Apps	Goals	Apps	Goals	Apps	Goals	Apps	Goals	Apps	Goals
River Plate	1998–99	Argentine Primera División	19	6			—		—		19	6
River Plate	1999–2000	Argentine Primera División	33	19			—		—		33	19
River Plate	2000–01	Argentine Primera División	34	20			—		—		34	20
River Plate	Total		86	45			—		—		86	45
Barcelona	2001–02	La Liga	36	17	1	0	—		11	4	48	21
Barcelona	2002–03	La Liga	36	13	1	0	—		14	7	51	20
Barcelona	2003–04	La Liga	33	14	5	2	—		7	3	45	19
Barcelona	2006–07	La Liga	18	5	5	5	—		1	0	24	10
Barcelona	Total		123	49	12	7	0	0	33	14	168	70
Monaco (loan)	2004–05	Ligue 1	29	7	5	6	1	0	7	4	42	17
Sevilla (loan)	2005–06	La Liga	29	9	0	0	—		13	6	42	15
Real Madrid	2007–08	La Liga	9	3	6	0	—		2	0	17	3
Real Madrid	2008–09	La Liga	8	1	2	1	—		2	0	12	2
Real Madrid	Total		17	4	8	1	0	0	4	0	29	5
Benfica	2009–10	Primeira Liga	27	11	2	1	4	1	11	6	44	19
Benfica	2010–11	Primeira Liga	24	9	6	3	3	1	12	1	45	14
Benfica	2011–12	Primeira Liga	18	4	2	1	5	1	6	0	31	6
Benfica	Total		69	24	10	5	12	3	29	7	120	39
Málaga	2012–13	La Liga	27	8	4	0	—		6	1	37	9
Olympiacos	2013–14	Super League Greece	25	12	4	0	—		5	2	34	14
Olympiacos	2014–15	Super League Greece	1	0	0	0	—		0	0	1	0
Olympiacos	Total		26	12	4	0	—		5	2	35	14
Verona	2014–15	Serie A	15	1	1	1	—		—		16	2
River Plate	2015	Argentine Primera División	13	0	0	0	—		2	0	15	0
Career total			434	159	44	20	13	3	99	34	590	216

=== International ===
Appearances and goals by national team and year
National team	Year	Apps	Goals
Argentina	2000	1	0
Argentina	2001	0	0
Argentina	2002	3	0
Argentina	2003	8	3
Argentina	2004	10	5
Argentina	2005	8	1
Argentina	2006	5	1
Argentina	2007	4	1
Total		39	11

Scores and results list Argentina's goal tally first, score column indicates score after each Saviola goal.

List of international goals scored by Javier Saviola
No.	Date	Venue	Opponent	Score	Result	Competition
1	20 April 2003	June 11, Tripoli, Libya	Libya	1–0	3–1	Friendly
2	8 June 2003	Nagai Stadium, Osaka, Japan	Japan	1–0	4–1	Friendly
3	11 June 2003	Seoul World Cup, Seoul, South Korea	South Korea	1–0	1–0	Friendly
4	30 June 2004	Giants Stadium, New Jersey, United States	Peru	2–0	2–1	Friendly
5	7 July 2004	Elías Aguirre, Chiclayo, Peru	Ecuador	2–1	6–1	2004 Copa América
6	7 July 2004	Elías Aguirre, Chiclayo, Peru	Ecuador	3–1	6–1	2004 Copa América
7	7 July 2004	Elías Aguirre, Chiclayo, Peru	Ecuador	4–1	6–1	2004 Copa América
8	17 November 2004	El Monumental, Buenos Aires, Argentina	Venezuela	3–1	3–2	2006 World Cup qualification
9	15 June 2005	RheinEnergieStadion, Cologne, Germany	Tunisia	2–0	2–1	2005 FIFA Confederations Cup
10	10 June 2006	Imtech Arena, Hamburg, Germany	Ivory Coast	2–0	2–1	2006 FIFA World Cup
11	7 February 2007	Stade de France, Saint-Denis, France	France	1–0	1–0	Friendly

== Honours ==
River Plate

- Argentine Primera División: 1999 Apertura, 2000 Clausura
- Copa Libertadores: 2015
- Suruga Bank Championship: 2015
- FIFA Club World Cup runner-up: 2015

Sevilla

- UEFA Cup: 2005–06

Real Madrid

- La Liga: 2007–08
- Supercopa de España: 2008

Benfica

- Primeira Liga: 2009–10
- Taça da Liga: 2009–10, 2010–11, 2011–12
- Supertaça Cândido de Oliveira runner-up: 2010

Olympiacos

- Super League Greece: 2013–14

Argentina

- FIFA World Youth Championship: 2001
- Summer Olympic Games: 2004
- Copa América runner-up: 2004
- FIFA Confederations Cup runner-up: 2005

Individual

- Argentine Primera División top scorer: 1999 Apertura
- South American Footballer of the Year: 1999
- South American Team of the Year: 1999
- Player of the Year of Argentina: 1999
- FIFA World Youth Championship Golden Ball: 2001
- FIFA World Youth Championship Golden Shoe: 2001
- Trofeo EFE: 2001–02
- Copa del Rey top scorer: 2006–07
- Primeira Liga Player of the Month: December 2009
- Portuguese Golden Ball: 2010
- FIFA 100: 2004
