= Ivan Santos (footballer, born 1982) =

Brazilian footballer

Personal information
- Full name: Ivan Carlos de Souza Santos
- Date of birth: 8 June 1982 (age 44)
- Place of birth: São Paulo, Brazil
- Position: Forward

Team information
- Current team: Gremio Barueri

Senior career*
Years	Team	Apps	(Gls)
2007	AD São Caetano		
2008	Grêmio Barueri		
2008–09	G.D. Estoril-Praia		
2009–2010	Belenenses		
2010	Volgar Astrakhan	10	(0)
2012	Guarani		(0)
2014	Água Santa		
2015	Gremio Barueri		
- * Club domestic league appearances and goals as of 22:03, 22 November 2010 (UTC)

Ivan Carlos de Souza Santos is a Brazilian footballer who plays as a forward.
