= Leandro da Silva (footballer, born 1989) =

Brazilian footballer

Leandro Silva
Personal information
- Full name: Leandro da Silva
- Date of birth: 11 January 1989 (age 37)
- Place of birth: Rio Branco do Sul, Brazil
- Height: 1.84 m (6 ft 0 in)
- Position: Centre back

Youth career
- 2006–2008: Coritiba

Senior career*
Years	Team	Apps	(Gls)
2008–2009	Coritiba	0	(0)
2009–2010	Benfica	0	(0)
2009–2010	→ Vitória Guimarães (loan)	5	(0)
2011–2012	Paraná	1	(0)
2012–2013	Doxa	24	(1)
2014–2015	Nea Salamina	20	(0)
2015–2016	Doxa	32	(2)

International career
2008–2009	Brazil U20	1	(0)
- * Club domestic league appearances and goals as of 19:53, 28 May 2016 (UTC)

Leandro da Silva (born 11 January 1989) is a Brazilian professional footballer who plays as a central defender.

== Club career ==
Born in Rio Branco do Sul, Paraná, Silva started his professional career with Coritiba. He appeared with the first team in the 2009 edition of the Brazilian Cup, against CSA and Ponte Preta.

In that summer, Silva was bought by S.L. Benfica. He was immediately loaned to another side in the Portuguese Primeira Liga, Guimarães-based Vitória SC, being rarely used during the season.

On 25 March 2011, Silva returned to Brazil and signed a long-term contract with Paraná Clube. After failing to appear officially, however, he moved clubs and countries again, joining Doxa Katokopias F.C. from the Cypriot First Division.

== International career ==
Silva was part of the Brazil under-20 squad at the 2009 South American Youth Championship, as the nation emerged victorious.

== Honours ==
Brazil U20

- South American Youth Championship: 2009
