= Alexandre Ludovic =

Portuguese footballer (born 1990)

Personal information
- Full name: Alexandre Ludovic Ribeiro Pereira
- Date of birth: 18 June 1990 (age 36)
- Place of birth: Paris, France
- Height: 1.68 m (5 ft 6 in)
- Position: Winger

Youth career
- 2001–2003: Paivense
- 2003–2004: Porto
- 2004–2009: Feirense

Senior career*
Years	Team	Apps	(Gls)
2009–2013	Feirense	80	(4)
2013–2015	Créteil	18	(2)
2015	Santa Clara	21	(0)
2015–2016	Chaves	9	(1)
2016	Zimbru Chișinău	7	(1)
2016–2017	Leixões	26	(2)
2017–2022	Penafiel	101	(10)
2022–2023	Varzim	6	(0)
Total		268	(20)

International career
2010	Portugal U20	1	(0)
2011–2012	Portugal U21	2	(0)
- * Club domestic league appearances and goals

Alexandre Ludovic Ribeiro Pereira (born 18 June 1990), known as Ludovic, is a Portuguese former professional footballer who played as a winger.

He made 29 appearances and scored two goals in the Primeira Liga for Feirense but spent most of his career in the second tier, where he totalled 208 games and 15 goals primarily for Feirense and Penafiel as well as three other clubs. He also had brief spells in France and Moldova.

== Club career ==
=== Feirense ===
Born in Paris, France to Portuguese parents, Ludovic was raised mainly in their country, and was formed as a footballer at C.D. Feirense after a year at FC Porto. He made his professional debut on 1 August 2009 in the first round of the Taça da Liga as a last-minute substitute for Claudinei Reis in a 1–1 away draw against Portimonense SC. He made his Liga de Honra bow 15 days later, as a starter in a 1–0 win at G.D. Chaves on the first day of the season.

Ludovic scored his first career goal on 13 February 2011 in the fifth minute of added time to beat F.C. Arouca 2–1 at home, and added another on 17 April in a 5–2 away victory over Moreirense F.C. as his team won promotion as runners-up to Gil Vicente FC. He played all bar one Primeira Liga games as the team from Santa Maria da Feira went straight back down in the 2011–12 campaign, scoring twice again, beginning with a late winner from the bench on 11 September in the 2–1 away defeat of S.C. Olhanense.

=== Créteil ===
On 24 June 2013, Ludovic moved to the outskirts of the city of his birth, signing for US Créteil-Lusitanos of Ligue 2 while his previous team retained 20% of his economic rights. He appeared in just under half of the matches in his one season, again scoring two goals; the first was in a 3–2 loss at FC Istres on 31 January, followed a week later by the opener in a 2–0 home win over Clermont Foot.

=== Return to Portugal ===
Ludovic returned to Portugal's second division with C.D. Santa Clara and Chaves, before a brief spell with FC Zimbru Chișinău in the Moldovan Super Liga. He returned home on 4 July 2016 to sign for Leixões SC.

On 13 June 2017, Ludovic was acquired by F.C. Penafiel. He renewed his contract two years later to last until 2021, and then again for one more year.

Ludovic dropped into the third tier for the first time in his career on 17 July 2022, signing a two-year deal at newly relegated Varzim SC. He announced his retirement in January 2023 at 32, immediately joining the club's coaching staff.

== International career ==
Ludovic earned one cap for the Portugal under-20 team on 28 January 2010, starting a 2–2 friendly draw with China in Óbidos. He played twice at under-21 level, debuting on 14 November 2011 as a late substitute in a game of the same score away to Albania in a European qualifier.
