= Hélio Vaz =

Portuguese footballer (born 1990)

Personal information
- Full name: Hélio José Vaz
- Date of birth: 19 December 1990 (age 35)
- Place of birth: Montijo, Portugal
- Height: 1.70 m (5 ft 7 in)
- Position: Forward

Team information
- Current team: Olímpico Montijo

Youth career
- 2002–2007: Montijo
- 2007–2008: Olímpico Montijo
- 2008–2009: Benfica

Senior career*
Years	Team	Apps	(Gls)
2009–2012	Benfica	0	(0)
2009	→ Mafra (loan)	4	(0)
2010	→ Tondela (loan)	1	(0)
2011	→ Casa Pia (loan)	14	(4)
2011–2012	→ Atlético (loan)	14	(0)
2012–2013	União Leiria	28	(10)
2013	Doxa	0	(0)
2013–2016	União Leiria	54	(12)
2016	Peniche	17	(4)
2016–2019	Torreense	86	(18)
2019–2020	Loures	22	(2)
2020–2021	Lusitano Évora	16	(4)
2021–2022	Cova Piedade	18	(0)
2022–	Olímpico Montijo	18	(8)
- * Club domestic league appearances and goals as of 19:52, 25 March 2023 (UTC)

Hélio José Vaz (born 19 December 1990) is a Portuguese footballer who plays for Clube Olímpico do Montijo as a forward.

== Club career ==
Born in Montijo, Setúbal District, Vaz started playing with hometown club C.D. Montijo, whose academy he joined at the age of 12. In 2008, for his last year as a junior, he signed with S.L. Benfica. Upon his arrival, he said that representing the latter was always a dream of his, and that he hoped it would also open the doors of the under-18 national team.

At the end of his youth career, and as Vaz was one of highest goalscorers throughout the season only behind Nélson Oliveira, Benfica decided to offer him a professional contract and loan him. He started out at C.D. Mafra, whom he represented in the opening stages of 2009–10. Due to the lack of playing time, he moved to fellow third division team C.D. Tondela for the remainder of the season.

Vaz was a regular fixture in the early training sessions of Benfica's main squad the following campaign, but in January 2011 he was loaned to Casa Pia A.C. of the third tier. For 2011–12, in also on loan, he joined Segunda Liga's Atlético Clube de Portugal, making his professional debut on 7 August 2011 by coming on as a 72nd-minute substitute in a 1–1 away draw against Portimonense S.C. in the first round of the Taça da Liga.

Subsequently, Vaz opted to terminate his contract with Benfica and join division three club U.D. Leiria, scoring ten goals in his debut season to help to a seventh-place finish. His performances attracted interest abroad, and he signed with Doxa Katokopias FC in the Cypriot First Division on a two-year deal, only to return to his previous team three months later.

Vaz moved to G.D. Peniche still in the third division at the beginning of the 2016 winter transfer window.
