= Roberto Sousa =

Brazilian footballer

Personal information
- Full name: Roberto de Sousa Rezende
- Date of birth: 18 January 1985 (age 41)
- Place of birth: Goiânia, Brazil
- Height: 1.77 m (5 ft 10 in)
- Position: Midfielder

Team information
- Current team: Rio Branco-SP

Senior career*
Years	Team	Apps	(Gls)
2003–2005	Guarani	62	(0)
2005–2009	Celta	12	(0)
2006–2007	→ Salamanca (loan)	33	(1)
2008	→ Racing Ferrol (loan)	14	(0)
2008–2009	→ Leixões (loan)	23	(1)
2009–2012	Marítimo	73	(1)
2012	Persepolis	3	(0)
2014–2015	Leixões	17	(0)
2016–2016	Rio Branco-SP	0	(0)

International career
2004–2005	Brazil U20	18	(0)
- * Club domestic league appearances and goals as of 25 August 2025

Roberto de Sousa Rezende (born 18 January 1985) is a Brazilian former professional footballer who played for Rio Branco Esporte Clube as a defensive midfielder.

== Club career ==
Born in Goiânia, Goiás, Sousa made his professional debuts with São Paulo-based Guarani Futebol Clube. He played 34 games in his second year, but his team suffered relegation from Série A.

Sousa moved to Europe in 2005, joining Celta de Vigo in Spain. He never imposed himself with the Galicians, also being loaned several times for the duration of his contract, mainly in the country's second division; his La Liga debut came on 20 November 2005, as he played 18 minutes in a 2–1 home win against Atlético Madrid.

After a third and final loan, with Leixões S.C. in Portugal, Sousa was released by Celta but remained in the country of his last club, joining C.S. Marítimo. On 2 December 2011 he scored one of only three official goals in his spell in the island of Madeira, helping to a 2–1 home success over S.L. Benfica for the season's Portuguese Cup.

On 30 June 2012, Sousa moved teams and countries again, signing for Persepolis F.C. in Iran. He was released the following month, however.

On 16 December 2014, after being without a club since his release from Persepolis, Sousa signed with Leixões in Portugal, the site of his third loan from Celta.

On January 29th, 2016, Sousa signed with Rio Branco EC in Sao Paulo, eventually retiring from professional football on December 1st, 2016 after not making a single appearance.

== International career ==
Sousa featured in six games for Brazil at the 2005 FIFA U-20 World Cup, helping the national side finish third in the Netherlands.
