= José Coelho (footballer, born 1990) =

Portuguese footballer (born 1990)

Personal information
- Full name: José Manuel Barbosa Alves
- Date of birth: 4 February 1990 (age 36)
- Place of birth: Paços de Ferreira, Portugal
- Height: 1.75 m (5 ft 9 in)
- Position: Midfielder

Youth career
- 1998–2001: Paços Ferreira
- 2001–2006: Porto
- 2006–2007: Inter Milan
- 2007–2009: Benfica

Senior career*
Years	Team	Apps	(Gls)
2009–2012	Benfica	0	(0)
2009–2010	→ Paços Ferreira (loan)	3	(0)
2010–2011	→ Fátima (loan)	16	(0)
2011–2012	→ Atlético (loan)	2	(0)
2012	Sheriff	7	(0)
2013	Freamunde	14	(5)
2013–2014	Penafiel	17	(0)
2014–2015	Felgueiras 1932	31	(7)
2015–2016	Olhanense	19	(3)
2016	Al Hala	6	(0)
2016–2017	Felgueiras 1932	10	(0)
2017–2018	Persela Lamongan	32	(4)
2018	OFI	11	(2)
2018–2021	Aliados Lordelo	45	(2)
Total		213	(23)

International career
2005–2006	Portugal U16	12	(1)
2006–2007	Portugal U17	9	(2)
- * Club domestic league appearances and goals

José Manuel Barbosa Alves (born 4 February 1990), known as José Coelho, is a Portuguese former professional footballer who plays as an attacking midfielder.

== Club career ==
=== Youth ===
Born in Paços de Ferreira, Coelho started his football career at hometown club F.C. Paços de Ferreira, then continued his formation with a further five years at FC Porto.

In 2006, he joined Inter Milan's Allievi Nazionali (under-17). He scored three league goals that season, ranking in the team behind Mario Balotelli (18 goals), Mattia Destro (nine) and Samuele Beretta (four) and also netting two of the six in the playoffs round as the club finished second in Group 1 (quarter-final), yet failing to qualify to the final.

In July 2007, Coelho was promoted to the Primavera Team, and played at the Champions Youth Cup in the following month. He finished his youth career at S.L. Benfica, staying there two years.

=== Professional ===
In summer 2009 Coelho, owned by Benfica, made his professional debut at his very first club Paços de Ferreira. His first official match was against another former team, Porto, in the 0–2 defeat for the Portuguese Supercup on 9 August. He made his first appearance in the Primeira Liga 20 days later in a 0–0 home draw against Vitória de Guimarães – on both occasions, he was brought from the bench.

In late July 2010, after only five overall appearances during the season, Coelho was loaned out again, this time to Segunda Liga's C.D. Fátima. He joined another club at that level, Atlético Clube de Portugal, for the following campaign on yet another loan.

In February 2012, Coelho terminated his contract with Benfica and signed for three years with FC Sheriff Tiraspol in Moldova. He returned to Portugal in the summer, however, to be close to his father who faced medical problems with two amputated legs; in early January 2013, after six months without a club, he joined second-tier side S.C. Freamunde.
