= Estádio José Arcanjo =

Stadium in Olhão, Portugal

Coordinates: 37°01′44.86″N 7°50′54.54″W

- Interactive map of Estádio José Arcanjo
- Full name: Estádio José Arcanjo
- Location: Olhão, Portugal
- Owner: Olhanense
- Capacity: 5,661
- Surface: Grass

Construction
- Built: 1984
- Opened: 1984
- Renovated: 2009

Tenant
- Olhanense

Estadio José Arcanjo is a multi-purpose stadium in Olhão, Portugal. It is currently used mostly for football matches and is the home stadium of Olhanense. The stadium was able to hold 11,622 people and was built in 1984. Currently the capacity is 5,661 people after renovations in 2009 in order to comply with the minimum requirements of the Portuguese first league.
