= Jorge Sousa =

Portuguese football referee (born 1975)

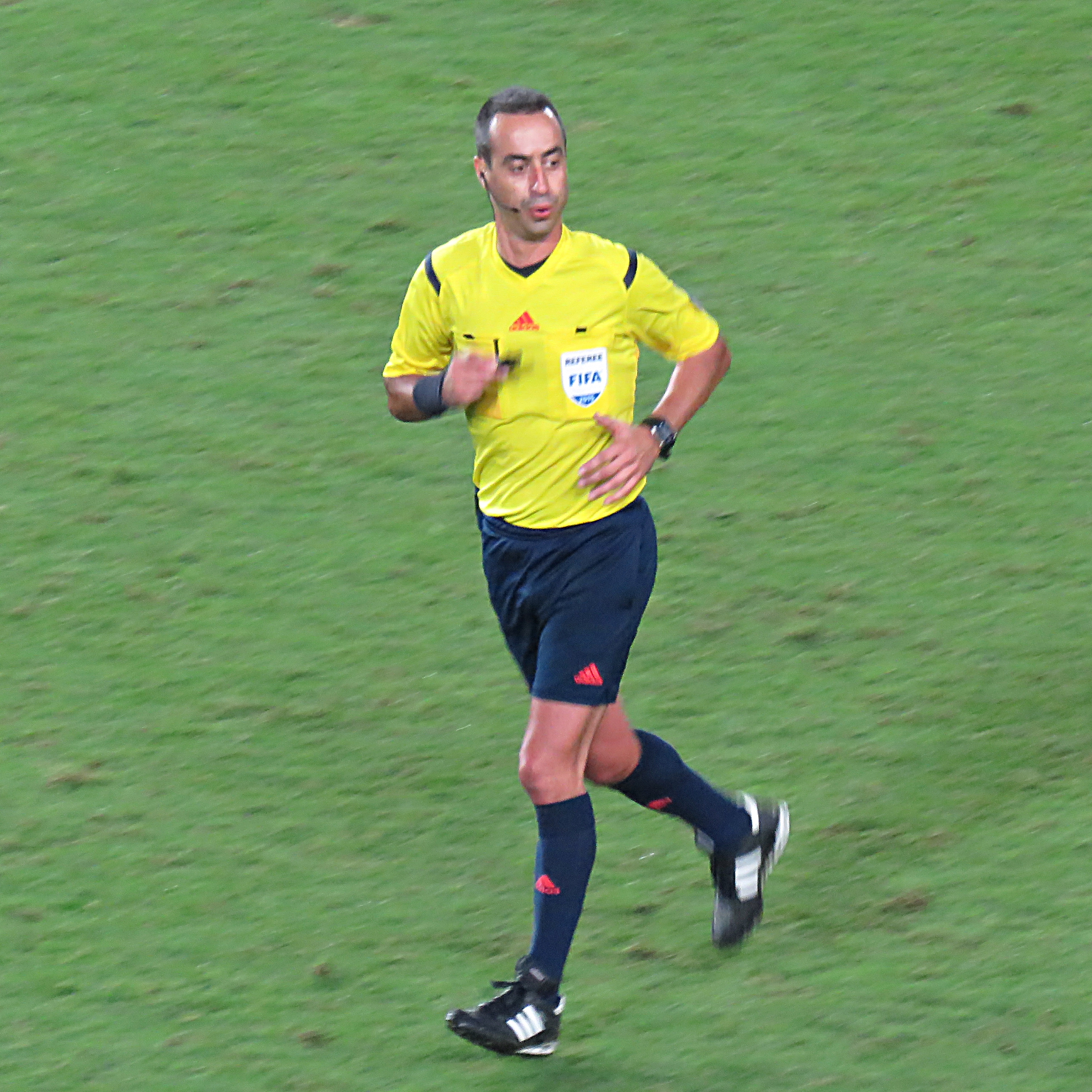
- Sousa in 2015
- Full name: Manuel Jorge Neves Moreira de Sousa
- Born: 18 June 1975 (age 51); Porto, Portugal

Domestic
Years	League	Role

International
Years	League	Role
2006–2018	FIFA listed	Referee

Manuel Jorge Neves Moreira de Sousa (European Portuguese pronunciation: [ˈʒɔɾʒɨ ˈsozɐ]; born 18 June 1975) is a Portuguese international football referee who has been active internationally since 2006.
