= 2009 Guadiana Trophy =

Tournament details
- Host country: Portugal
- Dates: 16 July 2009 – 18 July 2009
- Teams: 4
- Venue: Complexo Desportivo de Vila Real de Santo António

Final positions
- Champions: (Portugal) Benfica (3rd title)
- Runners-up: (Portugal) Olhanense
- Third place: (Belgium) Anderlecht
- Fourth place: (Spain) Athletic Bilbao

Tournament statistics
- Matches played: 4
- Goals scored: 11 (2.75 per match)
- Top scorer: 2 – Javier Saviola (Benfica)
- Best player: Javier Saviola (Benfica)

The 2009 Guadiana Trophy was a football competition that took place between 16-18 July 2009. This competition featured Benfica, Olhanense, Athletic Bilbao and Anderlecht.

Benfica won the 2009 Guadiana Trophy by defeating Olhanense 2-1 in the final.

The Guadiana Trophy was renamed the Algarve Football Cup after the 2013 edition, with the competition returning under its new name in 2016.

== Matches ==
=== Semi-finals ===
2009-07-16
22:15 CET

| Benfica (Portugal) | 2 – 1 | (Spain) Athletic Bilbao |
|---|---|---|
| Saviola 48' 66' | | Toquero 17' |

Complexo Desportivo de Vila Real de Santo António, Vila Real de Santo António

2009-07-16
22:15 CET

| Olhanense (Portugal) | 2 – 1 | (Belgium) Anderlecht |
|---|---|---|
| Zequinha 55'; Fábio 72' | | Biglia 64' |

Complexo Desportivo de Vila Real de Santo António, Vila Real de Santo António

=== Third place match ===
2009-07-18
20:00 CET

| (Spain) Athletic Bilbao | 2 – 2 (a.e.t.) | (Belgium) Anderlecht |
|---|---|---|
| de Marcos 30'; Gurpeguí 60' | | Suárez 13' de Sutter 26' |
Penalties
| Iturraspe (penalty missed); Gurpeguí (penalty scored); Susaeta (penalty scored); Yeste (penalty missed); Koikili (penalty scored) | 3 – 4 | (penalty scored) Boussoufa; (penalty scored) Wasilewski; (penalty missed) Kanu; (penalty scored) Biglia; (penalty scored) Suárez |

Complexo Desportivo de Vila Real de Santo António, Vila Real de Santo António

=== Final ===
2009-07-18
20:00 CET

| Benfica (Portugal) | 2 – 1 | (Portugal) Olhanense |
|---|---|---|
| Cardozo 64'; Miguel Vítor 90' | | Ukra 62' (pen.) |

Complexo Desportivo de Vila Real de Santo António, Vila Real de Santo António
