= André Soares (Portuguese footballer) =

Portuguese footballer

Personal information
- Full name: André Tiago Carneiro Soares
- Date of birth: 5 March 1990 (age 36)
- Place of birth: Vieira do Minho, Portugal
- Height: 1.72 m (5 ft 8 in)
- Position: Attacking midfielder

Team information
- Current team: Pevidém

Youth career
- 2000–2001: Vieira
- 2001–2004: Braga
- 2004–2009: Benfica

Senior career*
Years	Team	Apps	(Gls)
2009–2011	Benfica	0	(0)
2009	→ Carregado (loan)	3	(0)
2010	→ Atlético (loan)	7	(0)
2010–2011	→ Servette (loan)	11	(0)
2011–2013	Marítimo B	31	(5)
2013–2014	Famalicão	28	(3)
2014–2015	Vilaverdense	23	(4)
2015–2016	Gil Vicente	2	(0)
2016–2018	Vilaverdense	69	(11)
2018–2021	Vizela	69	(16)
2021–2024	Vilaverdense	81	(15)
2024–2026	Paredes	42	(10)
2026–	Pevidém	2	(0)

International career
2005–2006	Portugal U16	5	(1)
2007	Portugal U17	3	(0)
2007	Portugal U18	2	(0)
- * Club domestic league appearances and goals as of 18 September 2026

André Tiago Carneiro Soares (born 5 March 1990) is a Portuguese professional footballer who plays as an attacking midfielder for Pevidém.

== Club career ==
Born in Vieira do Minho, Braga District, Soares started playing football with local Vieira S.C. at age 10. He finished his development with S.L. Benfica, having signed in 2004.

Subsequently, Benfica offered Soares a professional contract and loaned him to A.D. Carregado, who were having their first-ever experience in the Segunda Liga. He made his professional debut on 15 November, coming on as a late substitute in a 1–0 away loss against C.D. Feirense. He moved to third-division club Atlético Clube de Portugal on loan for the second part of the season.

In June 2010, still owned by Benfica, Soares joined Servette FC of the Swiss Challenge League. He reunited with former Benfica youth coach João Alves, being sparingly used during the campaign.

On 31 August 2011, Soares moved to C.S. Marítimo as a free agent. He appeared solely for the reserve side during his tenure, helping them win promotion to the second tier in 2012.

Subsequently, Soares continued to compete in division three, with F.C. Famalicão and Vilaverdense FC. He had a brief return to the second tier in June 2015 after signing with Gil Vicente FC, who described him as a "technically gifted player", but returned to his previous team only six months later.

== International career ==
Soares helped the Portugal under-16 side to reach the final of the Val-de-Marne Tournament in October 2005. He also appeared for the nation during the qualifying stage for the 2007 UEFA European Under-17 Championship.
