= André Carvalhas =

Portuguese footballer

Personal information
- Full name: André Filipe da Silva Carvalhas
- Date of birth: 7 March 1989 (age 37)
- Place of birth: Lisbon, Portugal
- Height: 1.65 m (5 ft 5 in)
- Position: Winger

Youth career
- 1997–1999: Corroios
- 1999–2001: Cova Piedade
- 2001–2008: Benfica
- 2005–2006: → Corroios (loan)

Senior career*
Years	Team	Apps	(Gls)
2008–2011	Benfica	0	(0)
2008	→ Rio Ave (loan)	5	(0)
2009	→ Olhanense (loan)	4	(0)
2009–2011	→ Fátima (loan)	46	(6)
2011–2012	Trofense	26	(1)
2012–2013	Naval	37	(8)
2013–2014	Moreirense	19	(2)
2014–2015	Tondela	24	(2)
2015–2016	Portimonense	31	(2)
2016–2017	Cova Piedade	28	(2)
2017	Zaria	4	(0)
2018	União Madeira	15	(3)
2018–2020	Cova Piedade	16	(0)
2020–2022	Académico Viseu	40	(1)
2023	Fabril	7	(0)
Total		302	(27)

International career
2005	Portugal U16	4	(1)
2005–2006	Portugal U17	13	(5)
2006–2007	Portugal U18	9	(3)
2007–2008	Portugal U19	13	(7)
- * Club domestic league appearances and goals

André Filipe da Silva Carvalhas (born 7 March 1989) is a Portuguese former professional footballer who played as a winger.

== Club career ==
Carvalhas was born in Lisbon. A product of S.L. Benfica's youth system, he was promoted to the first team for 2008–09. However, on 16 July 2008, he was loaned to Rio Ave F.C. also in the Primeira Liga, to gain more playing time and experience; unsettled, he finished the season with Segunda Liga club S.C. Olhanense also on loan, where he also appeared rarely.

For 2009–10, Carvalhas continued in the second division and on loan, arranging a contract with recently-promoted C.D. Fátima; in July 2010, it was extended for another campaign. On 13 February of the following year he scored a hat-trick against Varzim S.C. in a 4–0 away win, and was voted the league's Young Player of the Month in February 2011– his team could not however avoid relegation, as 16th and last.

Carvalhas joined C.D. Trofense on 8 August 2011, as a free agent. On 19 July of the following year he signed for another side in division two, Associação Naval 1º de Maio.

After one season in Figueira da Foz, Carvalhas moved to yet another club in the second tier, Moreirense FC. After contributing two goals in 971 minutes to help them win the championship and subsequently promote, he agreed to a two-year deal with C.D. Tondela.

On 24 May 2015, in the last minute of the away fixture against S.C. Freamunde, Carvalhas scored through a free kick to level the score at 1–1 and help Tondela reach the top flight for the first time in its history, as champions. After being released, he returned to Algarve to sign with Portimonense SC. He found the net on the opening day of the campaign, helping defeat FC Porto B away 2–1.

On 26 June 2016, Carvalhas returned to C.D. Cova da Piedade who now competed in the second division, 15 years after having represented the club in its youth teams. He then moved abroad for the first time at FC Zaria Bălți, finishing fifth in the Moldovan National Division and being eliminated from the UEFA Europa League qualifiers by Apollon Limassol FC; he criticised the working conditions that he had in Eastern Europe.

Carvalhas returned to Portugal on 13 January 2018, signing for two and a half years with second-tier C.F. União. In June, he cancelled his cancelled his contract with the Madeirans after their relegation.

In July 2018, Carvalhas rejoined Cova da Piedade on a two-year deal.

== International career ==
A Portugal youth international, Carvalhas was the youngest player ever to represent the national team. He scored three goals in the 2008 Torneio Internacional do Porto for the under-19s.

Across four levels, Carvalhas earned 39 caps and scored 16 goals.

== Career statistics ==
As of 6 August 2017

Club	Season	League		Cup		League Cup		Europe		Total	
Club	Season	Apps	Goals	Apps	Goals	Apps	Goals	Apps	Goals	Apps	Goals
Rio Ave	2008–09	5	0	1	0	2	0	-		8	0
Olhanense	2008–09	4	0	0	0	0	0	-		4	0
Fátima	2009–10	24	1	1	0	2	0	-		27	1
Fátima	2010–11	22	5	2	0	4	1	-		28	6
Trofense	2011–12	26	1	2	0	0	0	-		28	1
Naval	2012–13	37	8	2	0	8	1	-		47	9
Moreirense	2013–14	19	2	0	0	4	1	-		23	3
Tondela	2014–15	24	2	0	0	2	0	-		26	2
Portimonense	2015–16	31	2	4	0	4	3	-		39	5
Cova Piedade	2016–17	28	2	1	0	1	0	-		30	2
Zaria	2017	1	0	0	0	0	0	-		1	0
Career total		219	23	12	0	27	6	-		261	29

== Honours ==
Olhanense

- Segunda Liga: 2008–09

Moreirense

- Segunda Liga: 2013–14

Tondela

- Segunda Liga: 2014–15

Individual

- Segunda Liga Young Player of the Month: February 2011
