= José Shaffer =

Argentine footballer

Personal information
- Full name: José Alberto Shaffer
- Date of birth: 16 December 1985 (age 40)
- Place of birth: Córdoba, Argentina
- Height: 1.75 m (5 ft 9 in)
- Position: Left wing back

Senior career*
Years	Team	Apps	(Gls)
2005–2009	Racing Club	41	(0)
2006–2007	→ IFK Göteborg (loan)	3	(0)
2009–2012	Benfica	4	(0)
2010	→ Banfield (loan)	6	(0)
2010–2011	→ Rosario Central (loan)	10	(0)
2011–2012	→ União Leiria (loan)	26	(2)
2013–2014	Talleres	21	(0)
2014−2015	Unión La Calera	16	(0)
2016	Gimnasia de Mendoza	5	(0)
2017–2018	El Porvenir	46	(2)
2019	Victoriano Arenas	7	(0)
Total		185	(4)
- * Club domestic league appearances and goals

José Alberto Shaffer (born 16 December 1985) is a former Argentine professional footballer who played as a left wingback.

== Career ==
In 2006, Shaffer was loaned on a one-year deal from Racing Club de Avellaneda to IFK Göteborg to replace the departing Oscar Wendt, who moved to FC Copenhagen. However, he did not manage to make a first team impact, and he subsequently moved back to Argentina after his short loan spell in Europe.

On 27 June 2009, it was announced that Shaffer had signed a deal with Portuguese club Benfica for €1.9 million. On 29 June, he was officially presented at Benfica's Estádio da Luz. However, after failing to hold on to a position in the first team, Shaffer moved once again back to Argentina on a 6-month loan to Banfield in January 2010. In 2010–2011 he was loaned to Rosario Central, until the end of the season. In 2011–2012, Shaffer was loaned to União Leiria.

On 27 September 2012, Shaffer terminated is contract with Benfica. In July 2013, he signed with Talleres de Córdoba. A year later, he joined Unión La Calera in Chile.

In 2016, Shaffer returned to Argentina and joined Gimnasia y Esgrima de Mendoza. He ended his career playing for El Porvenir and Victoriano Arenas in the Primera C.

== Career statistics ==
As of 23 June 2010

Club	Season	League		Cup		League Cup		Europe		Total	
Club	Season	Apps	Goals	Apps	Goals	Apps	Goals	Apps	Goals	Apps	Goals
Racing Club	2005–06	6	*	*	*	*	*	*	*	6	0
IFK Göteborg (loan)	2007	3	*	*	*	*	*	*	*	3	0
Racing Club	2007–08	6	*	*	*	*	*	*	*	6	0
Racing Club	2008–09	31	0	*	*	*	*	*	*	31	0
Benfica	2009–10	4	0	0	0	0	0	2	0	6	0
Banfield (loan)	2010	6	0	0	0	0	0	2	0	8	0
Career Total		56	0	0	0	0	0	4	0	60	0

== Honours ==
Benfica

- Primeira Liga: 2009–10
