= 2009 Amsterdam Tournament =

International football competition

The Amsterdam Tournament 2009 was the 11th Amsterdam Tournament, a pre-season football tournament which is contested from club teams from all over Western Europe. The 2009 tournament was contested by Ajax, Sunderland, Benfica, and Atlético Madrid. It was won for the first time by Portuguese side Benfica.

== Table ==
Team	Pld	W	D	L	GF	GA	GD	Pts
(Portugal) Benfica	2	2	0	0	5	2	3	11
(Netherlands) Ajax	2	0	1	1	5	6	-1	6
(England) Sunderland	2	1	0	1	2	2	0	5
(Spain) Atlético Madrid	2	0	1	1	3	5	-2	4

NB: An extra point is awarded for each goal scored.

== Matches ==
=== Day 1 ===
2009-07-24
19:00 CET

Sunderland (England)	0–2	(Portugal) Benfica
	Report	Cardozo 32' (pen.); Maxi Pereira 55'

Amsterdam ArenA, Amsterdam

2009-07-24
21:15 CET

Ajax (Netherlands)	3–3	(Spain) Atlético Madrid
Cvitanich 8'; Rommedahl 70'; Suárez 90'		Simão 30'; Agüero 41'; M. Rodríguez 76'

Amsterdam ArenA, Amsterdam

=== Day 2 ===
2009-07-26
19:00 CET

Sunderland (England)	2–0	(Spain) Atlético Madrid
Richardson 45' (pen.) 86'	Report

Amsterdam ArenA, Amsterdam

2009-07-26
21:15 CET

Ajax (Netherlands)	2–3	(Portugal) Benfica
Donald 44'; Rommedahl 77'	Report	Aissati 8' (o.g.); Di María 31'; David Luiz 55'

Amsterdam ArenA, Amsterdam
