= Ivan Santos (footballer, born 1988) =

Portuguese footballer

Personal information
- Full name: Ivan Manuel Amorim dos Santos
- Date of birth: 22 September 1988 (age 38)
- Place of birth: Espinho, Portugal
- Height: 1.74 m (5 ft 9 in)
- Position: Midfielder

Team information
- Current team: Maria Fonte

Youth career
- 2001–2003: Espinho
- 2003–2004: Pasteleira
- 2004–2005: Boavista
- 2005–2006: Candal
- 2006–2007: Boavista

Senior career*
Years	Team	Apps	(Gls)
2007–2008	Boavista	10	(1)
2008–2011	Benfica	0	(0)
2008–2009	→ Boavista (loan)	23	(0)
2009–2010	→ Carregado (loan)	3	(0)
2010	→ Atlético (loan)	7	(0)
2010–2011	→ Espinho (loan)	27	(3)
2011–2013	Oliveirense	54	(5)
2013–2014	Penafiel	15	(0)
2014–2015	Oliveirense	28	(3)
2015	Freamunde	1	(0)
2016–2017	Freamunde	0	(0)
2017–2018	Gondomar	13	(3)
2018–2020	Espinho	9	(0)
2020–2021	Cerveira	6	(0)
2021–	Maria Fonte	7	(1)

International career
2007	Portugal U19	10	(1)
2008	Portugal U20	9	(3)
- * Club domestic league appearances and goals as of 18:31, 21 December 2021 (UTC)

Ivan Manuel Amorim dos Santos (born 22 September 1988) is a Portuguese professional footballer who plays for SC Maria da Fonte as a midfielder.

== Club career ==
Born in Espinho, Santos made his Primeira Liga debut in 2007–08 with Boavista FC, and scored in his last appearance of the season, a 2–1 away loss against Sporting CP. In July 2008, he signed a three-year contract with S.L. Benfica, but was immediately loaned to Boavista, with the northern club now in the Segunda Liga for irregularities.

After appearing regularly for the Porto side, again relegated, Santos was loaned once more for the 2009–10 campaign, joining another team in the second division, newly-promoted A.D. Carregado. Shortly after, he dropped down to the third tier and moved, still on loan, to Atlético Clube de Portugal.

In 2010–11, Santos played with hometown's S.C. Espinho, scoring three goals for an eventual seventh-place finish in division three. For the following season he returned to the second tier, signing with U.D. Oliveirense and helping it reach the semi-finals of the Taça de Portugal for the first time ever.
