= List of Taça de Portugal winning managers =

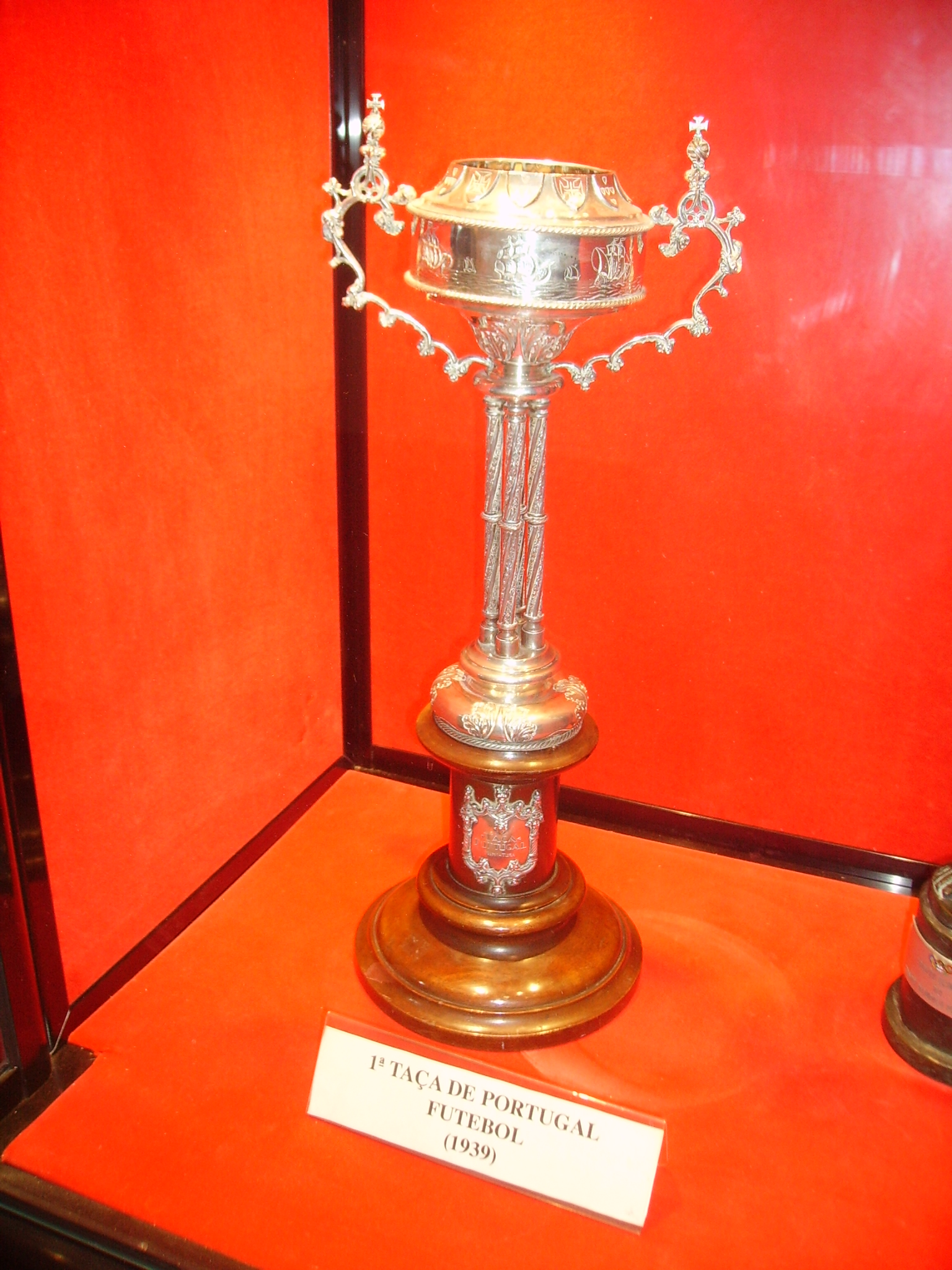
Replica of the Taça de Portugal trophy first awarded to Académica de Coimbra in 1939.

This is a list of Taça de Portugal winning football managers.

Albano Paulo led Académica to victory in the inaugural final.

Otto Glória, José Maria Pedroto and Sérgio Conceição have won the competition on four occasions, while János Biri and Fernando Vaz guided their teams to the trophy on three occasions. Otto Glória was the first manager to have won the competition with two different clubs, a feat later achieved by Fernando Vaz, José Maria Pedroto, Jimmy Hagan and Rui Vitória.

Nine managers led their teams to consecutive wins in the tournament: János Biri (1943, 1944), Cândido de Oliveira (1946, 1948) (Note: The 1946–47 edition of Taça de Portugal was not held due to overscheduling.), Ted Smith (1949, 1951) (Note: The 1949–50 edition of Taça de Portugal was not played due to the Latin Cup being held at Estádio Nacional.) Mário Lino (1973, 1974), John Mortimore (1986, 1987), Fernando Santos (2000, 2001), Paulo Bento (2007, 2008), Jesualdo Ferreira (2009, 2010) and Sérgio Conceição (2022–2024). José Maria Pedroto (1975–1977) and Sérgio Conceição (2022–2024) are the only managers to have won three consecutive times; the latter is the only to have won four times with the same club.

Fourteen men have won the tournament both as a player and as a manager, namely Fernando Caiado, Juca, José Maria Pedroto, José Augusto, Mário Lino, António Morais, João Alves, Artur Jorge, Toni, António Oliveira, António Sousa, Paulo Bento, Pedro Emanuel and Sérgio Conceição.

== Winning managers ==
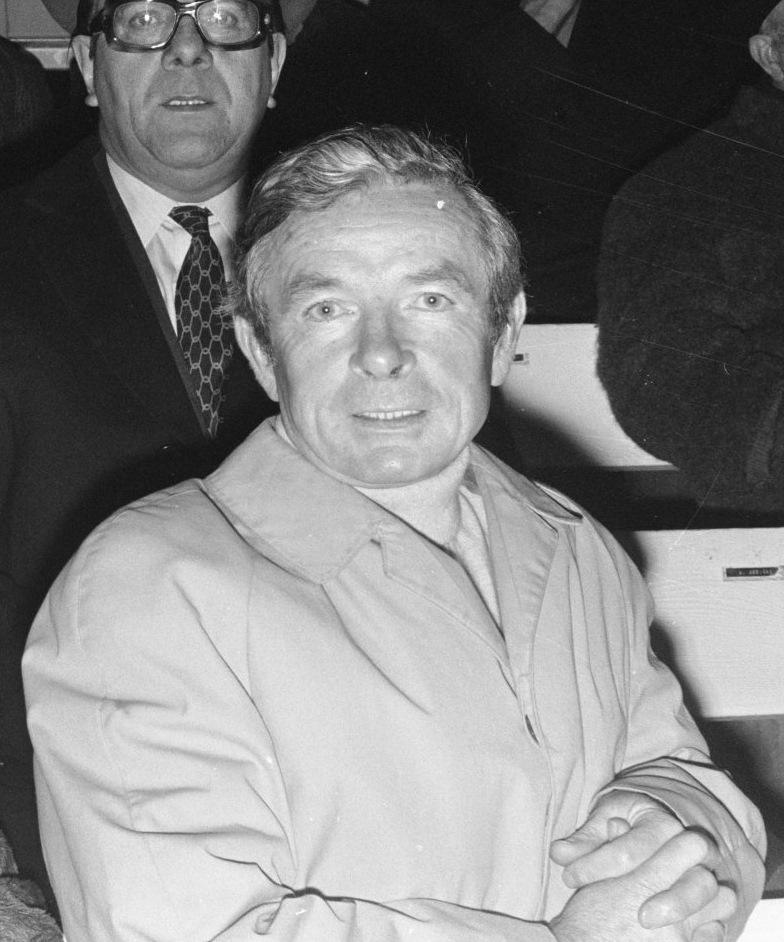
Jimmy Hagan, winning manager in 1972 and 1979.

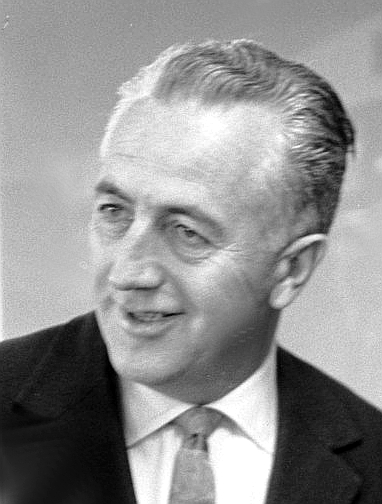
Lajos Baróti, winning manager in 1981.

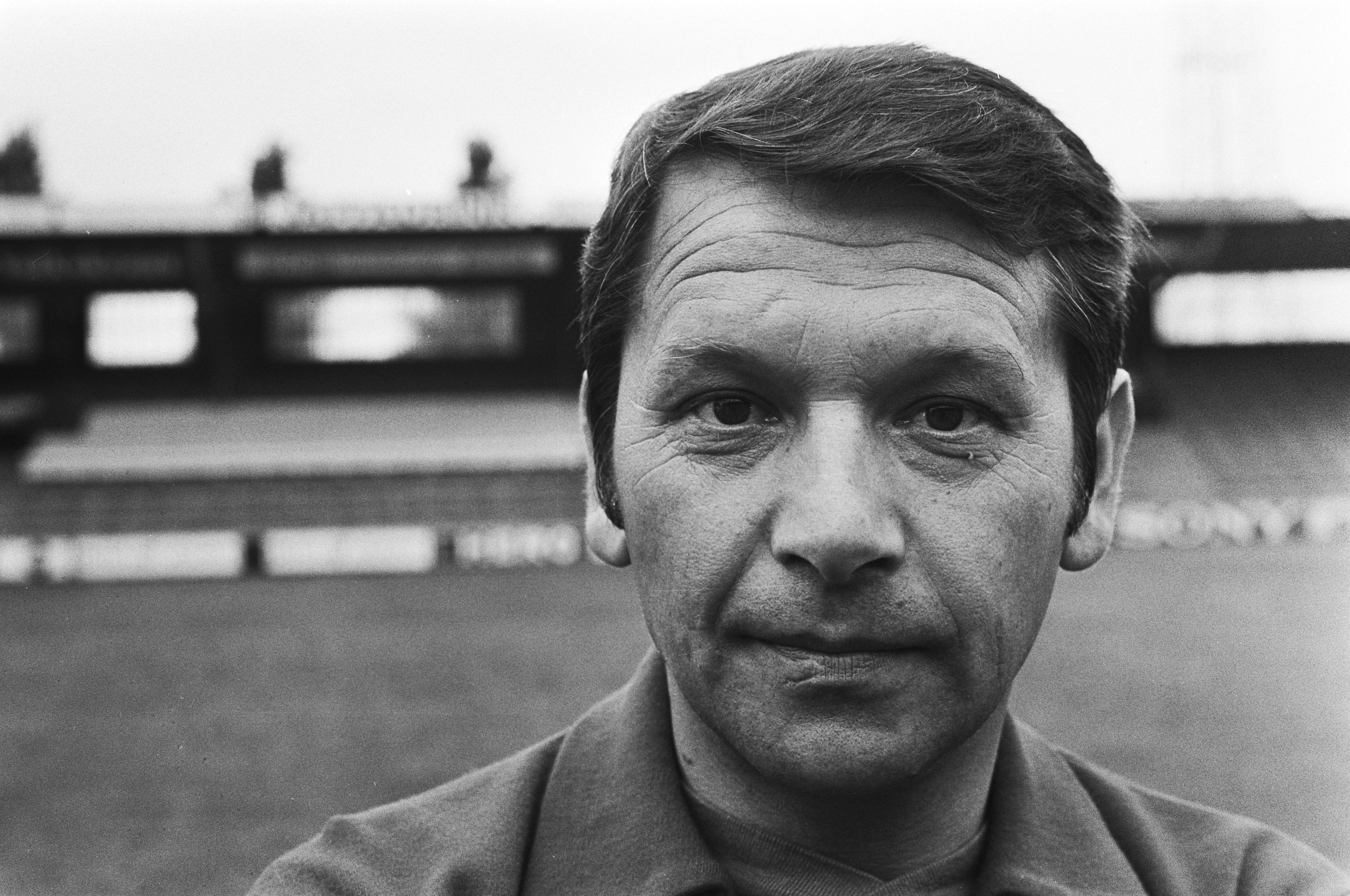
Tomislav Ivić, winning manager in 1988.

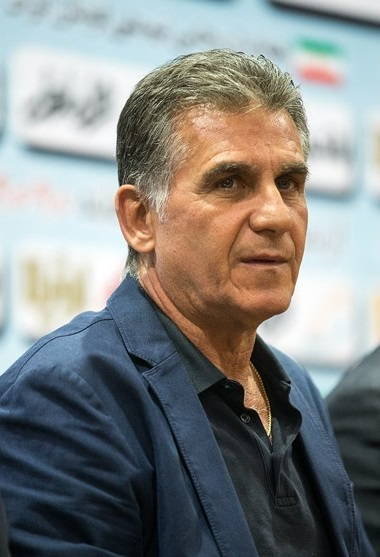
Carlos Queiroz, winning manager in 1995.

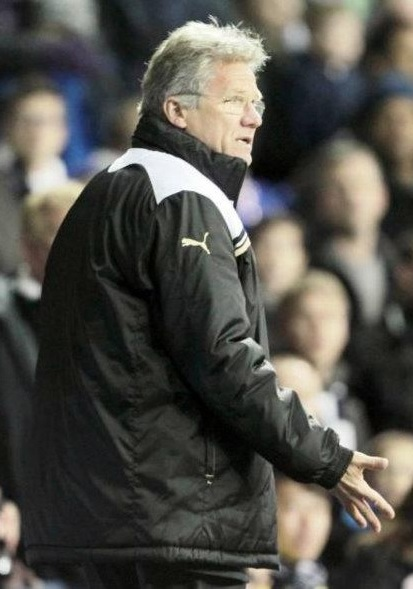
László Bölöni, winning manager in 2002.

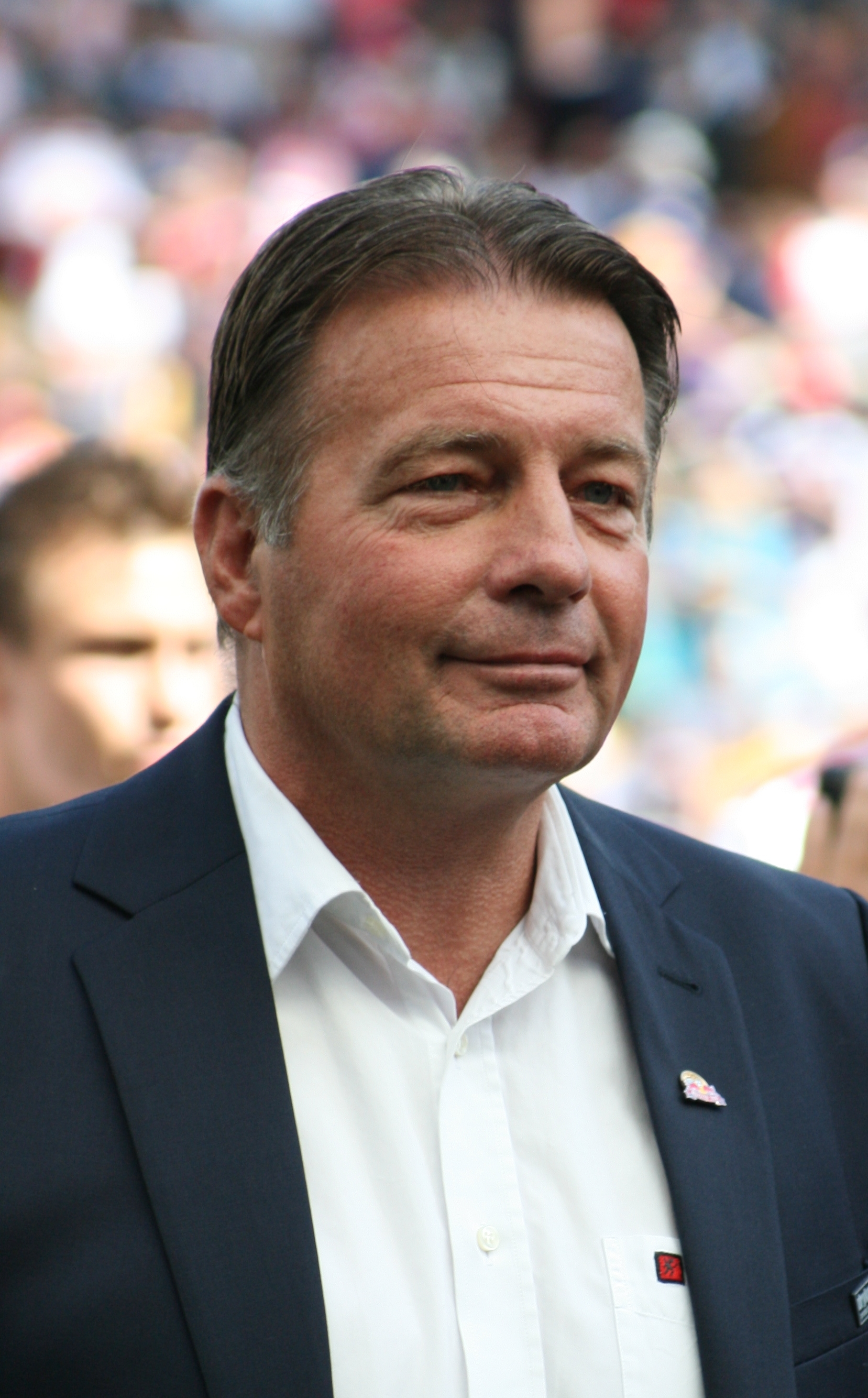
Co Adriaanse, winning manager in 2006.

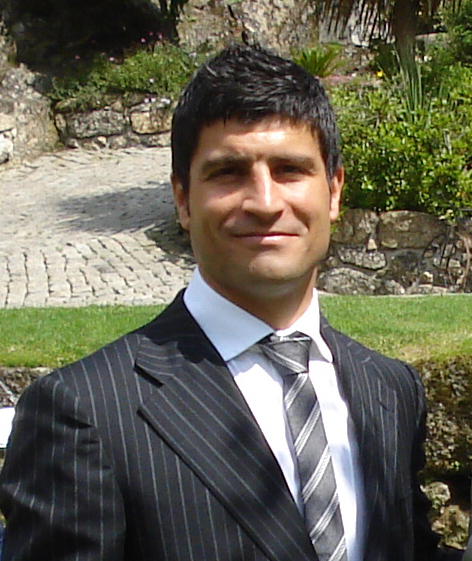
Pedro Emanuel, winning manager in 2012.

Final	Manager	Nationality	Club	Ref
1939	Albano Paulo	Portugal	Académica	
1940	János Biri	Hungary	Benfica	
1941	József Szabó	Hungary	Sporting CP	
1942	Rodolfo Faroleiro	Portugal	Belenenses	
1943	János Biri	Hungary	Benfica	
1944	János Biri	Hungary	Benfica	
1945	Joaquim Ferreira	Portugal	Sporting CP	
1946	Cândido de Oliveira	Portugal	Sporting CP	
1948	Cândido de Oliveira	Portugal	Sporting CP	
1949	Ted Smith	England	Benfica	
1951	Ted Smith	England	Benfica	
1952	Cândido Tavares	Portugal	Benfica	
1953	António Ribeiro dos Reis	Portugal	Benfica	
1954	József Szabó	Hungary	Sporting CP	
1955	Otto Glória	Brazil	Benfica	
1956	Dorival Knippel	Brazil	Porto	
1957	Otto Glória	Brazil	Benfica	
1958	Otto Bumbel	Brazil	Porto	
1959	José Valdivieso	Argentina	Benfica	
1960	Otto Glória	Brazil	Belenenses	
1961	Filpo Núñez	Argentina	Leixões	
1962	Fernando Caiado	Portugal	Benfica	
1963	Juca	Portugal	Sporting CP	
1964	Lajos Czeizler	Hungary	Benfica	
1965	Fernando Vaz	Portugal	Vitória de Setúbal	
1966	Rui Sim-Sim	Portugal	Braga	
1967	Fernando Vaz	Portugal	Vitória de Setúbal	
1968	José Maria Pedroto	Portugal	Porto	
1969	Otto Glória	Brazil	Benfica	
1970	José Augusto	Portugal	Benfica	
1971	Fernando Vaz	Portugal	Sporting CP	
1972	Jimmy Hagan	England	Benfica	
1973	Mário Lino	Portugal	Sporting CP	
1974	Mário Lino	Portugal	Sporting CP	
1975	José Maria Pedroto	Portugal	Boavista	
1976	José Maria Pedroto	Portugal	Boavista	
1977	José Maria Pedroto	Portugal	Porto	
1978	Rodrigues Dias	Portugal	Sporting CP	
1979	Jimmy Hagan	England	Boavista	
1980	Mário Wilson	Portugal	Benfica	
1981	Lajos Baróti	Hungary	Benfica	
1982	Malcolm Allison	England	Sporting CP	
1983	Sven-Göran Eriksson	Sweden	Benfica	
1984	António Morais	Portugal	Porto	
1985	Pál Csernai	Hungary	Benfica	
1986	John Mortimore	England	Benfica	
1987	John Mortimore	England	Benfica	
1988	Tomislav Ivić	Yugoslavia	Porto	
1989	Marinho Peres	Brazil	Belenenses	
1990	João Alves	Portugal	Estrela da Amadora	
1991	Artur Jorge	Portugal	Porto	
1992	Manuel José	Portugal	Boavista	
1993	Toni	Portugal	Benfica	
1994	Bobby Robson	England	Porto	
1995	Carlos Queiroz	Portugal	Sporting CP	
1996	Mário Wilson	Portugal	Benfica	
1997	Mário Reis	Portugal	Boavista	
1998	António Oliveira	Portugal	Porto	
1999	António Sousa	Portugal	Beira-Mar	
2000	Fernando Santos	Portugal	Porto	
2001	Fernando Santos	Portugal	Porto	
2002	László Bölöni	Romania	Sporting CP	
2003	José Mourinho	Portugal	Porto	
2004	José Antonio Camacho	Spain	Benfica	
2005	José Rachão	Portugal	Vitória de Setúbal	
2006	Co Adriaanse	Netherlands	Porto	
2007	Paulo Bento	Portugal	Sporting CP	
2008	Paulo Bento	Portugal	Sporting CP	
2009	Jesualdo Ferreira	Portugal	Porto	
2010	Jesualdo Ferreira	Portugal	Porto	
2011	André Villas-Boas	Portugal	Porto	
2012	Pedro Emanuel	Portugal	Académica	
2013	Rui Vitória	Portugal	Vitória de Guimarães	
2014	Jorge Jesus	Portugal	Benfica	
2015	Marco Silva	Portugal	Sporting CP	
2016	Paulo Fonseca	Portugal	Braga	
2017	Rui Vitória	Portugal	Benfica	
2018	José Mota	Portugal	Desportivo das Aves	
2019	Marcel Keizer	Netherlands	Sporting CP	
2020	Sérgio Conceição	Portugal	Porto	
2021	Carlos Carvalhal	Portugal	Braga	
2022	Sérgio Conceição	Portugal	Porto	
2023	Sérgio Conceição	Portugal	Porto	
2024	Sérgio Conceição	Portugal	Porto	
2025	Rui Borges	Portugal	Sporting CP	
2026	Luís Tralhão	Portugal	Torreense	

== Managers with multiple titles ==
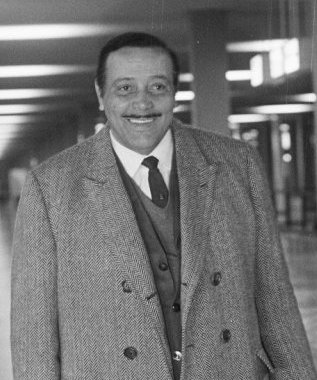
Otto Glória, winning manager in 1955, 1957, 1960 and 1969.

Rank	Name	Number of wins	Club(s)	Winning years
1	(Brazil) Otto Glória	4	Benfica, Belenenses	1955, 1957, 1960, 1969
=	(Portugal) José Maria Pedroto	4	Porto, Boavista	1968, 1975, 1976, 1977
=	(Portugal) Sérgio Conceição	4	Porto	2020, 2022, 2023, 2024
4	(Hungary) János Biri	3	Benfica	1940, 1943, 1944
=	(Portugal) Fernando Vaz	3	Vitória de Setúbal, Sporting CP	1965, 1967, 1971
6	(Portugal) Cândido de Oliveira	2	Sporting CP	1946, 1948
=	(England) Ted Smith	2	Benfica	1949, 1951
=	(Hungary) József Szabó	2	Sporting CP	1941, 1954
=	(Portugal) Mário Lino	2	Sporting CP	1973, 1974
=	(England) Jimmy Hagan	2	Benfica, Boavista	1972, 1979
=	(England) John Mortimore	2	Benfica	1986, 1987
=	(Portugal) Mário Wilson	2	Benfica	1980, 1996
=	(Portugal) Fernando Santos	2	Porto	2000, 2001
=	(Portugal) Paulo Bento	2	Sporting CP	2007, 2008
=	(Portugal) Jesualdo Ferreira	2	Porto	2009, 2010
=	(Portugal) Rui Vitória	2	Vitória de Guimarães, Benfica	2013, 2017

== By nationality ==
Country	Managers	Total
Portugal	40	54
England	5	8
Hungary	5	8
Brazil	4	7
Argentina	2	2
Netherlands	2	2
Croatia	1	1
Romania	1	1
Spain	1	1
Sweden	1	1

== See also ==
- List of Taça da Liga winning managers
- List of Supertaça Cândido de Oliveira winning managers
