= List of Supertaça Cândido de Oliveira winning managers =

This is a list of Supertaça Cândido de Oliveira winning football managers.

Six men have won the tournament both as a player and as a manager, namely António Oliveira, Manuel Fernandes, Rui Barros, Paulo Bento, Sérgio Conceição and Ruben Amorim.

== Winning managers ==
| Final | Manager | Nationality | Club | Ref. |
|---|---|---|---|---|
| 1979 | Mário Lino | Portugal | Boavista | |
| 1980 | Lajos Baróti | Hungary | Benfica | |
| 1981 | Hermann Stessl | Austria | Porto | |
| 1982 | António Oliveira | Portugal | Sporting CP | |
| 1983 | António Morais | Portugal | Porto | |
| 1984 | Artur Jorge | Portugal | Porto | |
| 1985 | John Mortimore | England | Benfica | |
| 1986 | Artur Jorge | Portugal | Porto | |
| 1987 | Keith Burkinshaw | England | Sporting CP | |
| 1988 | Geninho | Brazil | Vitória de Guimarães | |
| 1989 | Sven-Göran Eriksson | Sweden | Benfica | |
| 1990 | Artur Jorge | Portugal | Porto | |
| 1991 | Carlos Alberto Silva | Brazil | Porto | |
| 1992 | Manuel José | Portugal | Boavista | |
| 1993 | Bobby Robson | England | Porto | |
| 1994 | Bobby Robson | England | Porto | |
| 1995 | Octávio Machado | Portugal | Sporting CP | |
| 1996 | António Oliveira | Portugal | Porto | |
| 1997 | Mário Reis | Portugal | Boavista | |
| 1998 | Fernando Santos | Portugal | Porto | |
| 1999 | Fernando Santos | Portugal | Porto | |
| 2000 | Manuel Fernandes | Portugal | Sporting CP | |
| 2001 | Octávio Machado | Portugal | Porto | |
| 2002 | László Bölöni | Romania | Sporting CP | |
| 2003 | José Mourinho | Portugal | Porto | |
| 2004 | Víctor Fernández | Spain | Porto | |
| 2005 | Ronald Koeman | Netherlands | Benfica | |
| 2006 | Rui Barros | Portugal | Porto | |
| 2007 | Paulo Bento | Portugal | Sporting CP | |
| 2008 | Paulo Bento | Portugal | Sporting CP | |
| 2009 | Jesualdo Ferreira | Portugal | Porto | |
| 2010 | André Villas-Boas | Portugal | Porto | |
| 2011 | Vítor Pereira | Portugal | Porto | |
| 2012 | Vítor Pereira | Portugal | Porto | |
| 2013 | Paulo Fonseca | Portugal | Porto | |
| 2014 | Jorge Jesus | Portugal | Benfica | |
| 2015 | Jorge Jesus | Portugal | Sporting CP | |
| 2016 | Rui Vitória | Portugal | Benfica | |
| 2017 | Rui Vitória | Portugal | Benfica | |
| 2018 | Sérgio Conceição | Portugal | Porto | |
| 2019 | Bruno Lage | Portugal | Benfica | |
| 2020 | Sérgio Conceição | Portugal | Porto | |
| 2021 | Ruben Amorim | Portugal | Sporting CP | |
| 2022 | Sérgio Conceição | Portugal | Porto | |
| 2023 | Roger Schmidt | Germany | Benfica | |
| 2024 | Vítor Bruno | Portugal | Porto | |
| 2025 | Bruno Lage | Portugal | Benfica | |
| 2026 | Francesco Farioli | Italy | Porto | |

== Managers with multiple titles ==
| Rank | Manager | Titles | Club(s) | Winning years |
|---|---|---|---|---|
| 1 | (Portugal) Artur Jorge | 3 | Porto | 1984, 1986, 1990 |
| 1 | (Portugal) Sérgio Conceição | 3 | Porto | 2018, 2020, 2022 |
| 3 | (England) Bobby Robson | 2 | Porto | 1993, 1994 |
| 3 | (Portugal) António Oliveira | 2 | Sporting CP, Porto | 1982, 1996 |
| 3 | (Portugal) Fernando Santos | 2 | Porto | 1998, 1999 |
| 3 | (Portugal) Octávio Machado | 2 | Sporting CP, Porto | 1995, 2001 |
| 3 | (Portugal) Paulo Bento | 2 | Sporting CP | 2007, 2008 |
| 3 | (Portugal) Vítor Pereira | 2 | Porto | 2011, 2012 |
| 3 | (Portugal) Jorge Jesus | 2 | Benfica, Sporting CP | 2014, 2015 |
| 3 | (Portugal) Rui Vitória | 2 | Benfica | 2016, 2017 |
| 3 | (Portugal) Bruno Lage | 2 | Benfica | 2019, 2025 |

== By nationality ==
| Country | Managers | Total |
|---|---|---|
| Portugal | 22 | 34 |
| England | 3 | 4 |
| Austria | 1 | 1 |
| Brazil | 2 | 2 |
| Hungary | 1 | 1 |
| Netherlands | 1 | 1 |
| Romania | 1 | 1 |
| Spain | 1 | 1 |
| Sweden | 1 | 1 |
| Germany | 1 | 1 |
| Italy | 1 | 1 |

== See also ==
- List of Taça de Portugal winning managers
- List of Taça da Liga winning managers
