= List of Taça da Liga winning managers =

This is a list of Taça da Liga winning football managers.

Taça da Liga was established in the 2007–08 season. Carlos Carvalhal won the first edition with Vitória de Setúbal.

Quique Flores was the first foreign manager to win the competition. With the victory in 2018, Jorge Jesus became the first manager to win the tournament with two clubs, a feat later achieved by Ruben Amorim (in consecutive seasons). Amorim was also the first to win the tournament both as a player and as a manager.

== Winning managers ==
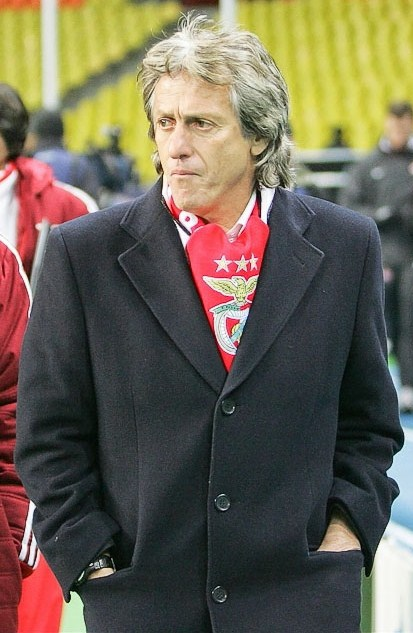
Jorge Jesus won the trophy a record six times.

Year	Manager	Nationality	Club	Ref.
2008	Carlos Carvalhal	Portugal	Vitória de Setúbal	
2009	Quique Flores	Spain	Benfica	
2010	Jorge Jesus	Portugal	Benfica	
2011	Jorge Jesus	Portugal	Benfica	
2012	Jorge Jesus	Portugal	Benfica	
2013	José Peseiro	Portugal	Braga	
2014	Jorge Jesus	Portugal	Benfica	
2015	Jorge Jesus	Portugal	Benfica	
2016	Rui Vitória	Portugal	Benfica	
2017	Augusto Inácio	Portugal	Moreirense	
2018	Jorge Jesus	Portugal	Sporting CP	
2019	Marcel Keizer	Netherlands	Sporting CP	
2020	Ruben Amorim	Portugal	Braga	
2021	Ruben Amorim	Portugal	Sporting CP	
2022	Ruben Amorim	Portugal	Sporting CP	
2023	Sérgio Conceição	Portugal	Porto	
2024	Artur Jorge	Portugal	Braga	
2025	Bruno Lage	Portugal	Benfica	
2026	Luís Pinto	Portugal	Vitória de Guimarães	

== Managers with multiple titles ==
Rank	Manager	Wins	Club(s)	Winning years
1	(Portugal) Jorge Jesus	6	Benfica, Sporting CP	2010, 2011, 2012, 2014, 2015, 2018
2	(Portugal) Ruben Amorim	3	Braga, Sporting CP	2020, 2021, 2022

== By nationality ==
Country	Managers	Total
Portugal	10	17
Spain	1	1
Netherlands	1	1

== See also ==
- List of Taça de Portugal winning managers
- List of Supertaça Cândido de Oliveira winning managers
