= 2007 Taça de Portugal final =

- Event: 2006–07 Taça de Portugal
| Belenenses | Sporting CP |
| 0 | 1 |
- Date: 27 May 2007
- Venue: Estádio Nacional, Oeiras
- Referee: Pedro Proença (Lisbon)
- Attendance: 37,000

The 2007 Taça de Portugal final was the final match of the 2006–07 Taça de Portugal, the 67th season of the Taça de Portugal, the premier Portuguese football cup competition organized by the Portuguese Football Federation (FPF). The match was played on 27 May 2007 at the Estádio Nacional in Oeiras, and opposed two Primeira Liga sides: Belenenses and Sporting CP. Sporting CP defeated Belenenses 1–0 to claim their fourteenth Taça de Portugal.

In Portugal, the final was televised live in HD on RTP1 and Sport TV. As Sporting CP claimed the Taça de Portugal, they qualified for the 2007 Supertaça Cândido de Oliveira, where they took on the winners of the 2006–07 Primeira Liga, Porto at the Estádio Dr. Magalhães Pessoa.

== Match ==
=== Details ===
27 May 2007
17:00 WEST

| Belenenses | 0–1 | Sporting CP |
|---|---|---|
| | | Liédson 87' |

Estádio Nacional, Oeiras
Attendance: 37,000
Referee: Pedro Proença (Lisbon)

| Belenenses | Sporting CP |

| GK | 73 | (Portugal) Costinha |
| RB | 2 | (Brazil) Amaral | | (substituted off) 88' |
| CB | 13 | (Portugal) Rolando |
| CB | 25 | (Brazil) Nivaldo |
| LB | 4 | (Brazil) Rodrigo Alvim |
| DM | 6 | (Brazil) Sandro Gaúcho |
| CM | 27 | (Portugal) Cândido Costa |
| CM | 5 | (Portugal) Ruben Amorim | | (substituted off) 71' |
| AM | 11 | (Portugal) José Pedro |
| CF | 10 | (Portugal) Silas (c) | | (substituted off) 75' |
| CF | 30 | (Cape Verde) Dady |
Substitutes:
| GK | 1 | (Portugal) Marco |
| DF | 17 | (Portugal) Gaspar |
| DF | 21 | (Serbia) Ivan Đurđević |
| MF | 24 | (Portugal) Carlitos | | (substituted on) 88' |
| FW | 19 | (Brazil) Roma |
| FW | 77 | (Brazil) Fernando | | (substituted on) 71' |
| FW | 99 | (Panama) José Garcés | (yellow card) 90+3' | (substituted on) 75' |
Manager:
(Portugal) Jorge Jesus

| GK | 1 | (Portugal) Ricardo (c) |
| RB | 78 | (Portugal) Abel |
| CB | 12 | (Portugal) Marco Caneira |
| CB | 4 | (Brazil) Ânderson Polga |
| LB | 11 | (Chile) Rodrigo Tello | | (substituted off) 65' |
| DM | 24 | (Portugal) Miguel Veloso |
| CM | 28 | (Portugal) João Moutinho |
| CM | 18 | (Portugal) Nani | (yellow card) 73' |
| AM | 30 | (Argentina) Leandro Romagnoli | | (substituted off) 90+1' |
| CF | 19 | (Brazil) Alecsandro | | (substituted off) 70' |
| CF | 31 | (Brazil) Liédson |
Substitutes:
| GK | 16 | (Portugal) Tiago |
| DF | 13 | (Portugal) Tonel | | (substituted on) 65' |
| MF | 21 | (Sweden) Pontus Farnerud |
| MF | 27 | (Portugal) Custódio | | (substituted on) 90+1' |
| MF | 34 | (Portugal) João Alves |
| MF | 76 | (Paraguay) Carlos Paredes |
| FW | 20 | (Portugal) Yannick Djaló | | (substituted on) 70' |
Manager:
(Portugal) Paulo Bento

2006–07 Taça de Portugal Winners
Sporting CP
14th Title

Match officials

- Assistant referees:
  - Tiago Trigo (Lisbon)
  - Ricardo Santos (Lisbon)
- Fourth official: João Vilas Boas (Braga)

Match rules

- 90 minutes
- Penalty shoot-out if scores level after 90 minutes
- Seven named substitutes
- Maximum of three substitutions
