= 1966 Taça de Portugal final =

- Event: 1965–66 Taça de Portugal
Braga	Vitória de Setúbal
1	0
- Date: 22 May 1966
- Venue: Estádio Nacional, Oeiras
- Referee: Braga Barros (Leiria)
- Attendance: 35,000

The 1966 Taça de Portugal final was the final match of the 1965–66 Taça de Portugal, the 26th season of the Taça de Portugal, the premier Portuguese football cup competition organized by the Portuguese Football Federation (FPF). The match was played on 22 May 1966 at the Estádio Nacional in Oeiras, and opposed two Primeira Liga sides: Braga and Vitória de Setúbal. Braga defeated Vitória de Setúbal 1–0 to claim the Taça de Portugal for the first time.

== Match ==
=== Details ===
22 May 1966

Braga	1–0	Vitória de Setúbal
Perrichon 77'

Estádio Nacional, Oeiras
Attendance: 35,000
Referee: Braga Barros (Leiria)

Braga	Vitória de Setúbal

GK	1	(Portugal) Armando Silva
DF		(Portugal) Joaquim Coimbra
DF		(Portugal) Mário dos Santos
DF		(Portugal) José Azevedo
MF		(Portugal) Bino
MF		(Portugal) Juvenal Costa
MF		(Portugal) Carlos Canário (c)
MF		(Portugal) Luciano Marques
FW		(Portugal) Adão
FW		(Portugal) Estevão Mansidão
FW	10	(Argentina) Miguel Perrichon
Substitutes:
Manager:
(Portugal) Rui Sim-Sim

GK	1	(Portugal) José Mourinho Félix
DF	4	(Portugal) Carlos Torpes (c)
DF		(Portugal) Joaquim Conceição
MF		(Portugal) Jaime Graça
MF		(Portugal) Armando Bonjour
MF		(Portugal) Carriço
MF		(Portugal) Manuel Leiria
MF		(Brazil) Augusto Martins
FW		(Portugal) Carlos Manuel
FW		(Portugal) Quim
FW		(Portugal) José Maria
Substitutes:
Manager:
(Portugal) Fernando Vaz

1965–66 Taça de Portugal Winners
Braga
1st Title

Match officials

- Assistant referees:
- Fourth official:

Match rules

- 90 minutes.
- 30 minutes of extra time if necessary.
