= Bino =

Bino may refer to:

- Binoculars
- Bino (footballer, born 1940), Portuguese footballer
- Bino (footballer, born 1972), Portuguese footballer
- Bino (particle)
- Bino (singer) (1953–2010), Italian pop singer
- Bino, a nickname for rapper and singer Childish Gambino
- Wine
