= Carlos Canário (footballer, born 1944) =

Portuguese footballer (born 1944)

Personal information
- Full name: Carlos Manuel Elvas Canário
- Date of birth: 21 June 1944 (age 82)
- Place of birth: Portugal
- Position: Midfielder

Youth career
- Sporting CP

Senior career*
Years	Team	Apps	(Gls)
- Braga
- * Club domestic league appearances and goals

Carlos Manuel Elvas Canário (born 21 June 1944) is a Portuguese former footballer who played as a midfielder.

== Early and personal life ==
Canário's father, also named Carlos, played in the same position for Sporting CP. The younger Canário became a registered member of the club at age one and watched them from age three, before starting basketball with them aged 12 and switching to football two years later.

== Career ==
Canário was the captain of the Braga side that won the first Taça de Portugal of the club's history. In the quarter-finals, the club had eliminated European champions Benfica in a replay. They won 1–0 in the final against Vitória de Setúbal on 22 May 1966; the result was a shock as Vitória had won the league fixture 8–1 two weeks earlier, and Canário was competing against international midfielder Jaime Graça. Canário's training for the final had been interrupted by being called up for military service and stationed in Mafra; he barely celebrated the result due to fear he would be sent to Portuguese Guinea to fight against independence.
