= 1945 Taça de Portugal final =

- Event: 1944–45 Taça de Portugal
Olhanense	Sporting CP
0	1
- Date: 1 July 1945
- Venue: Campo das Salésias, Lisbon
- Referee: Domingos Miranda (Porto)

The 1945 Taça de Portugal final was the final match of the 1944–45 Taça de Portugal, the 7th season of the Taça de Portugal, the premier Portuguese football cup competition organized by the Portuguese Football Federation (FPF). The match was played on 1 July 1945 at the Campo das Salésias in Lisbon, and opposed two Primeira Liga sides: Olhanense and Sporting CP. Sporting CP defeated Olhanense 1–0 to claim their second Taça de Portugal.

== Match ==
=== Details ===
1 July 1945

Olhanense	0–1	Sporting CP
		Correia 86'

Campo das Salésias, Lisbon

Olhanense	Sporting CP

GK	1	(Portugal) José Abraão (c)
DF		(Portugal) Nunes
DF		(Portugal) Santos
DF		(Portugal) António Rodrigues
MF		(Portugal) Joaquim Paulo
MF		(Portugal) Grazina
MF		(Portugal) Loulé
MF		(Portugal) Moreira
FW		(Portugal) Fernando Cabrita
FW		(Portugal) Salvador
FW		(Portugal) Francisco Palmeiro
Substitutes:
Manager:
(Portugal) Cassiano

GK	1	(Portugal) João Azevedo
DF		(Portugal) Álvaro Cardoso
DF		(Portugal) Octávio Barrosa
MF		(Portugal) João Nogueira
MF		(Portugal) António Lourenço
MF		(Portugal) Veríssimo Alves
MF		(Portugal) Manuel Marques (c)
FW		(Portugal) Albano
FW		(Portugal) Jesus Correia
FW		(Portugal) João Cruz
FW		(Portugal) Armando Ferreira
Substitutes:
Manager:
(Portugal) Cândido de Oliveira

1944–45 Taça de Portugal Winners
Sporting CP
2nd Title

Match officials

- Assistant referees:
- Fourth official:

Match rules

- 90 minutes.
