= António Morais (football manager) =

Portuguese footballer (1934–1989)

Personal information
- Full name: António da Rocha Morais
- Date of birth: 30 December 1934
- Place of birth: Vila Nova de Gaia, Portugal
- Date of death: 1 July 1989 (aged 54)
- Place of death: Ourique, Portugal
- Position: Forward

Youth career
- 1951–1956: FC Porto

Senior career*
Years	Team	Apps	(Gls)
1956–1962	FC Porto	34	(9)
1963–1965	Braga	26	(8)
1965–1966	Tirsense		

Managerial career
- 1967–1969: FC Porto (assistant)
- 1969–1974: Vitória Setúbal (assistant)
- 1974–1975: Boavista (assistant)
- 1975–1980: FC Porto (assistant)
- 1980–1982: Vitória Guimarães (assistant)
- 1982–1983: FC Porto (assistant)
- 1983–1984: FC Porto
- 1984: Portugal (assistant)
- 1985–1986: Vitória Guimarães
- 1986–1987: Rio Ave
- 1988: Sporting CP
- 1988–1989: Leixões
- * Club domestic league appearances and goals

António da Rocha Morais (30 December 1934 – 1 July 1989) was a Portuguese football forward and manager, best known for his association with FC Porto.

Morais died as a result of a car crash in 1989 at the age of 54.

== Managerial statistics ==
Team	From	To	Record				
Team	From	To	G	W	D	L	Win %
FC Porto	1983	1984	35	23	8	4	65.71
Vitória Guimarães	1985	1986	30	16	8	6	53.33
Rio Ave	1986	1987	49	21	9	19	42.86
Sporting CP	1988	1988	19	10	6	3	52.63
Leixões	1988	1989	29	7	8	14	24.14
Total			162	77	39	46	47.53

== Honours ==
=== Player ===
Porto

- Primeira Liga: 1958–59
- Portuguese Cup: 1957–58

=== Manager ===
Porto

- Portuguese Cup: 1983–84
- Portuguese Supercup: 1983
- UEFA Cup Winners' Cup runner-up: 1983–84

== See also ==
- List of Taça de Portugal winning managers
- List of Supertaça Cândido de Oliveira winning managers
