= Kátia Aveiro =

Portuguese singer (born 1977)

- Born: Liliana Cátia Santos Aveiro; 5 October 1977 (age 49); Funchal, Portugal
- Children: 3
- Mother: Dolores Aveiro
- Relatives: Cristiano Ronaldo (brother)
- Musical career
- Genre: Pop
- Occupation: Singer
- Years active: 2005–present

Liliana Cátia Santos Aveiro (born 5 October 1977) is a Portuguese pop singer. She launched her singing career in 2005 under the artistic name Ronalda, after her brother, footballer Cristiano Ronaldo, releasing the album Pronta P'ra Te Amar (lit. 'Ready to Love You'), a romantic pop album with slow songs.

In 2008, Aveiro wrote the song "Vivo na Esperança de Te Ver" (lit. 'I Live in the Hope of Seeing You') with her brother Ronaldo, containing lyrics that honor their father Dinis Aveiro, who died in 2005. In 2009, she stopped singing and dedicated herself to her two children, and opened the CR7 stores in partnership with her sister, containing her brother's products. Aveiro resumed her music career in 2012. In July 2013, she released the single "Boom Sem Parar" (lit. 'Non-stop Boom'), which reached 750,000 views on YouTube in fifteen days. The song was produced by RedOne, a regular contributor to Lady Gaga and Jennifer Lopez's albums.

== Personal life ==
Aveiro is the mother of Rodrigo (born 2000) and Dinis (born 2010) from her relationship with José Pereira. With Brazilian businessman Alexandre Bertolucci, she has a daughter named Valentina (born 2019).
