= Miguel Perrichon =

Argentine footballer

Personal information
- Full name: Miguel Angel Perrichon Segóvia
- Date of birth: 20 March 1941 (age 85)
- Place of birth: Córdoba, Argentina
- Position: Forward

Senior career*
Years	Team	Apps	(Gls)
1961	Talleres de Córdoba	–	(–)
1962	Olimpo	–	(–)
1963–1964	Punta Alta	–	(–)
1964–1965	Boavista	–	(–)
1965–1967	Braga	48	(19)
1967–1969	Deportivo Oro	–	(–)
1969–1970	Irapuato	–	(–)
1970–1971	Necaxa	–	(–)
1971–1972	Boavista	2	(0)
1972	Toronto Blizzard	–	(–)
1972–1973	União de Coimbra	15	(5)
1973	Toronto Blizzard	–	(–)
1973–1974	Braga	–	(–)
1974	Toronto Italia	–	(–)
1975	Los Angeles Aztecs (futsal)	–	(–)
1975	Cleveland Cobras	–	(–)
- * Club domestic league appearances and goals

Miguel Angel Perrichon Segóvia (born 30 March 1941), known as Miguel Perrichon, is a former Argentine professional football player.

Perrichon scored the winning goal in the 1966 Taça de Portugal Final, which granted Braga its first Taça de Portugal in its history. In 1974, he played in the National Soccer League with Toronto Italia.
