= Pedro Russiano =

Portuguese football manager and former player

Personal information
- Full name: Pedro Miguel Braço Forte Russiano
- Date of birth: 19 November 1984 (age 41)
- Place of birth: Montijo, Portugal
- Height: 1.78 m (5 ft 10 in)
- Position: Winger

Youth career
- 1994–1998: Benfica
- 1998–2001: Vitória Setúbal

Senior career*
| Years | Team | Apps | (Gls) |
| 2001–2003 | Porto | 0 | (0) |
| 2001–2003 | Porto B | 3 | (0) |
| 2003–2004 | Académica | 0 | (0) |
| 2003–2004 | Académica B | 20 | (0) |
| 2004–2005 | Olivais Moscavide | 22 | (2) |
| 2005–2007 | Vitória Setúbal | 4 | (0) |
| 2005–2006 | Vitória Setúbal B | 20 | (2) |
| 2007–2008 | Gela | 5 | (0) |
| 2008–2009 | Gloria Buzău | 7 | (0) |
| 2009–2010 | Al-Riffa | – | (–) |
| 2011–2013 | Louletano | 20 | (2) |
| Total | | 101 | (6) |

International career
| 2003 | Portugal U19 | 2 | (0) |

Managerial career
- 2018–2019: Amora
- * Club domestic league appearances and goals

Pedro Miguel Braço Forte Russiano (born 19 November 1984), simply known as Pedro Russiano is a Portuguese former footballer and current manager of Lusitano de Évora

== Career ==
Russiano played in the Benfica youth team with Ruben Amorim and Bruno Simão.

Russiano was part of the Vitória Setúbal side who reached the 2005–06 Taça de Portugal.

After several unsuccessful seasons playing in Portugal, Russiano left for Italian club Gela. He would remain with the Italian side for one season, making only five appearances. Following his departure from Gela, Russiano would have spells at Romanian side Gloria Buzău and Bahraini club Al-Riffa, before moving back to Portugal to play for Louletano.
