= Bruno Simão =

Portuguese footballer

Personal information
- Full name: Bruno Martins Simão
- Date of birth: 5 May 1985 (age 41)
- Place of birth: Lisbon, Portugal
- Height: 1.77 m (5 ft 10 in)
- Position: Left-back

Youth career
- 1994–1998: Benfica
- 1998–1999: Oeiras
- 1999–2000: Benfica
- 2000–2001: Estoril
- 2001–2004: Belenenses

Senior career*
Years	Team	Apps	(Gls)
2004–2005	Benfica B		
2005–2006	Barreirense	6	(0)
2006–2008	UTA Arad	36	(1)
2009	Dinamo București	10	(0)
2009	Slovan Bratislava	7	(0)
2010	Astra Ploieşti	4	(0)
2011	Khazar	8	(0)
2011–2013	Milsami	28	(2)
2013	Doxa	0	(0)
2013–2014	Dacia	11	(0)
2014	União Leiria	13	(1)
2014–2015	Oliveirense	35	(0)
2015–2016	União Leiria	10	(0)
2016	Atlético	15	(1)
2016–2017	Fátima	24	(0)
2017–2018	Lusitanos Saint-Maur	9	(0)
2018	Pinhalnovense	1	(0)
2018–2020	Casa Pia	44	(0)
2020	Torreense	5	(0)
2020–2021	Oriental	14	(0)
2021	Atlético	2	(0)
Total		282	(5)

International career
2001–2002	Portugal U17	4	(0)
2002	Portugal U18	2	(0)
2003–2004	Portugal U19	8	(0)
2004	Portugal U20	2	(0)
- * Club domestic league appearances and goals

Bruno Martins Simão (born 5 May 1985) is a Portuguese former professional footballer who played as a left-back.

He spent most of his career abroad, making 49 appearances with three clubs in Romania's Liga I and also winning cups in Azerbaijan and Moldova, in addition to brief stints in Slovakia, Cyprus and France. Domestically, he totalled 68 games in LigaPro, where he represented four teams.

== Club career ==
Simão was born in Lisbon. He had two stints at Benfica's youth system, where he played with Ruben Amorim and Pedro Russiano.

Following the decision of club president João Vale e Azevedo to dissolve the club's underage teams, Simão moved on to Estoril and Belenenses before returning to the Eagles' reserves. After a brief spell in the Segunda Liga with Barreirense, he moved abroad for the first time to UTA Arad in Romania's Liga I.

Simão had further experience of the Eastern European country's top flight with Dinamo București and Astra Giurgiu, with a year at Slovan Bratislava in Slovakia in between. In 2010, he signed for Khazar Lankaran of the Azerbaijan Premier League, and won the cup in his only season.

Moving on to Milsami Orhei of Moldova, Simão was again a cup champion in his first campaign (2011–12), also picking up the Super Cup that summer. After a brief stint in Cyprus with Doxa Katokopias without playing, he signed in September 2013 with Dacia Chișinău in the previous country.

Simão's eight-year Eastern adventure ended in 2014 as he joined União de Leiria in his country's third division, moving on to Oliveirense in LigaPro that July. Following a brief return to Leiria in July 2015, he signed for Atlético Clube de Portugal of division two.

In August 2017, Simão headed abroad again to sign for Lusitanos Saint-Maur, a Portuguese-community team in France's fourth tier. He left soon after for Pinhalnovense in the Portuguese lower leagues, where he suffered a road accident that put him in a coma for two days.

Simão joined Casa Pia in July 2018, and was part of their squad that defeated Vilafranquense on penalties to win the third-division title. He was one of three players to be released halfway through the season in January 2020, dropping down a level to Torreense.

== Personal life ==
Simão's younger brother, David, was also a footballer, in the midfielder position. Their cousin Amorim was also involved in the sport, as both a player and a manager.

== Career statistics ==
As of 19 October 2019

Appearances and goals by club, season and competition
Club	Season	League			Cup (Note: Includes national cup and league cup matches)		Continental		Total	
Club	Season	Division	Apps	Goals	Apps	Goals	Apps	Goals	Apps	Goals
Belenenses	2003–04	Primeira Liga	0	0	0	0	—		0	0
Barreirense	2005–06	Segunda Liga	6	0	1	0	—		7	0
UTA Arad	2006–07	Liga I	12	0	0	0	—		12	0
UTA Arad	2007–08	Liga I	23	1	0	0	—		23	1
UTA Arad	2008–09	Liga II	1	0	0	0	—		1	0
UTA Arad	Total		36	1	0	0	—		36	1
Dinamo București	2008–09	Liga I	9	0	1	0	—		10	0
Slovan Bratislava	2009–10	Slovak Superliga	7	0	0	0	2 (Note: Appearances in UEFA Champions League and UEFA Europa League)	0	9	0
Astra Ploieşti	2009–10	Liga I	4	0	0	0	—		4	0
Khazar	2010–11	Azerbaijan Premier League	8	0	2	0	—		10	0
Milsami	2011–12	Divizia Națională	15	0	0	0	—		15	0
Milsami	2012–13	Divizia Națională	13	2	1	0	2 (Note: Appearances in UEFA Europa League)	0	16	2
Milsami	Total		28	2	1	0	2	0	31	2
Doxa	2013–14	Cypriot First Division	0	0	0	0	—		0	0
Dacia	2013–14	Divizia Națională	11	0	0	0	—		11	0
União Leiria	2013–14	Campeonato de Portugal	13	1	0	0	—		13	1
Oliveirense	2014–15	Segunda Liga	35	0	5	0	—		40	0
União Leiria	2015–16	Campeonato de Portugal	10	0	2	0	—		12	0
Atlético	2015–16	Segunda Liga	15	1	0	0	—		15	1
Fátima	2016–17	Campeonato de Portugal	24	0	3	0	—		27	0
Lusitanos Saint-Maur	2017–18	Championnat National 2	9	0	1	0	—		10	0
Pinhalnovense	2017–18	Campeonato de Portugal	1	0	0	0	—		1	0
Casa Pia	2018–19	Campeonato de Portugal	32	0	3	0	—		35	0
Casa Pia	2019–20	Segunda Liga	7	0	2	0	—		9	0
Casa Pia	Total		39	0	5	0	—		44	0
Career total			255	5	21	0	4	0	280	5

== Honours ==
Khazar Lankaran

- Azerbaijan Cup: 2010–11

Milsami

- Moldovan Cup: 2011–12
- Moldovan Super Cup: 2012

Casa Pia

- Campeonato de Portugal: 2018–19
