= Marco Gonçalves =

Portuguese footballer (born 1978)

Marco
Personal information
- Full name: Marco André Azevedo Gonçalves
- Date of birth: 1 March 1978 (age 48)
- Place of birth: Amares, Portugal
- Height: 1.92 m (6 ft 4 in)
- Position: Goalkeeper

Youth career
- 1989–1992: Braga
- 1993–1994: Palmeiras Braga
- 1994–1997: Dumiense

Senior career*
Years	Team	Apps	(Gls)
1997–1999	Águias da Graça		
1999–2001	Amares		
2001–2006	Braga	14	(0)
2002–2005	Braga B	10	(0)
2006–2008	Belenenses	17	(0)
2008–2009	Gil Vicente	25	(0)
2009–2010	UD Oliveirense	18	(0)
2010–2011	Arouca	15	(0)
2011–2012	Espinho	5	(0)
2012–2013	Trofense	35	(0)
2013–2014	Boavista	13	(0)
2014–2015	AD Oliveirense	2	(0)
2015–2016	Centro Lusitano Zurique		
2017–2018	Maria Fonte	0	(0)
Total		154	(0)
- * Club domestic league appearances and goals

Marco André Azevedo Gonçalves (born 1 March 1978), known simply as Marco, is a Portuguese former professional footballer who played as a goalkeeper.

== Club career ==
Marco was born in Amares, Braga District. During his professional career, he played for S.C. Braga (where he was consecutively barred by two Portuguese internationals, Quim and Paulo Santos, after the former's departure to S.L. Benfica), C.F. Os Belenenses, Gil Vicente FC, U.D. Oliveirense, F.C. Arouca and C.D. Trofense, the first two in the Primeira Liga and the last four in the Segunda Liga.

Marco made his debut in the Portuguese top flight on 17 February 2002, appearing for Braga in a 1–0 away loss against C.D. Santa Clara.
