= Ruben Amorim =

Portuguese football manager (born 1985)

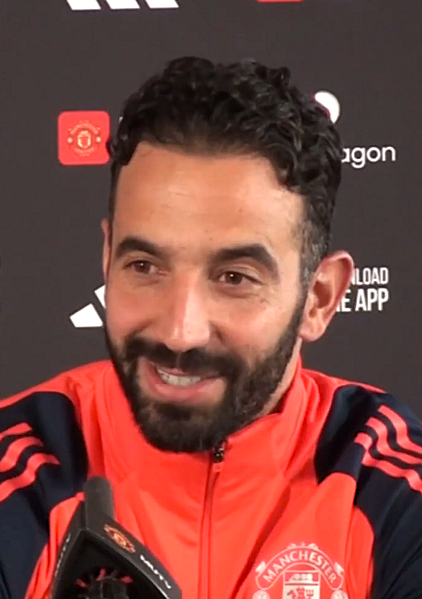
- Amorim with Manchester United in 2025

Personal information
- Full name: Ruben Filipe Marques Amorim
- Date of birth: 27 January 1985 (age 41)
- Place of birth: Lisbon, Portugal
- Height: 1.78 m (5 ft 10 in)
- Position: Midfielder

Team information
- Current team: AC Milan (head coach)

Youth career
- 1998–2000: Clube Atlético Cultural
- 2000–2002: Benfica
- 2002–2003: Belenenses

Senior career*
Years	Team	Apps	(Gls)
2003–2008	Belenenses	96	(4)
2008–2017	Benfica	95	(5)
2012–2013	→ Braga (loan)	30	(4)
2015	→ Benfica B (loan)	2	(0)
2015–2016	→ Al-Wakrah (loan)	14	(2)
Total		237	(15)

International career
2003	Portugal U18	3	(0)
2003–2004	Portugal U19	13	(0)
2004–2005	Portugal U20	13	(0)
2005–2008	Portugal U21	10	(0)
2010–2014	Portugal	14	(0)

Managerial career
- 2018–2019: Casa Pia
- 2019: Braga B
- 2019–2020: Braga
- 2020–2024: Sporting CP
- 2024–2026: Manchester United
- 2026–: AC Milan
- * Club domestic league appearances and goals

Ruben Filipe Marques Amorim (European Portuguese: [ˈʁuβɛn fɨˈlipɨ ˈmaɾkɨʃ ɐmuˈɾĩ]; born 27 January 1985) is a Portuguese professional football manager and former player who is currently head coach of Serie A club AC Milan.

As a footballer, Amorim played as a midfielder. He spent most of his professional career with Belenenses and Benfica, signing with the latter in 2008 and going on to win ten major titles, including three league titles, one Taça de Portugal, five Taças da Liga and one Supertaça Cândido de Oliveira. He represented Portugal in two FIFA World Cups, earning a total of 14 caps.

His managerial career started in 2017, managing Casa Pia in 2018, before resigning after six months. He then was appointed head coach at Braga's reserve team, before taking charge of the Braga senior side in December 2019, winning the 2020 Taça da Liga in his half-season. In March 2020, Amorim was appointed manager of Sporting CP, becoming then the third most expensive manager ever. In his first full season, Amorim guided the club to a double by winning both the Taça da Liga and the Primeira Liga, ending the latter's 19-year league title drought. These achievements won him the Primeira Liga's Manager of the Year award for the 2020–21 season. He later led them to another Primeira Liga title in the 2023–24 season, being named for the second time Primeira Liga's Manager of the Year.

He left the club for Manchester United in late 2024, bringing them to the final of the Europa League in 2025, before being dismissed from his role in January 2026. He joined AC Milan in June 2026.

== Club career ==
=== Early career ===
Amorim began his career with Benfica, playing in the youth team alongside Bruno Simão and Pedro Russiano.

=== Belenenses ===
After being released by Benfica, Amorim went on trial with Belenenses at the suggestion of Simao, playing with a broken arm.

Amorim made his debut in the Primeira Liga on 14 December 2003, playing one minute for Belenenses in a 2–0 home win against Alverca. He played in the 2007 Portuguese Cup final for the club.

=== Benfica ===
In late April 2008, Amorim signed a four-year deal with Benfica after his Belenenses contract expired. During his first season he was a regular starter, scoring his first goal on 23 November in a 2–0 away victory over Académica de Coimbra.

Competing with new signings Javi García and Ramires, Amorim appeared less in 2009–10, but still featured prominently (24 matches with ten starts) as the side won the league – and the League Cup – after a five-year drought. When healthy, he was again regularly used by manager Jorge Jesus in the 2010–11 season. On 19 January 2011, however, after undergoing surgery on both knees, he was sidelined for several months.

In early October 2011, whilst on duty with the national team, Amorim criticised Jesus' preferences – Benfica played most of their games without a single Portuguese player. Increasingly disgusted with his plight, in December, he refused to train with the bench players – after warming up for several minutes only to not be used – following a game against Rio Ave, being subjected to the club's disciplinary proceedings; on 30 January 2012, a loan was arranged with Braga until June of the following year.

In 2013–14, Amorim returned to the Estádio da Luz and played 37 matches across all competitions, helping to win an unprecedent treble of league, Taça de Portugal and Taça da Liga. At the beginning of the following campaign, he featured the full 120 minutes to help his team defeat Rio Ave in the Supertaça Cândido de Oliveira, thus winning four titles in 2014. On 24 August, however, he got severely injured while playing on an artificial turf at Boavista, with news the next day reporting an anterior cruciate ligament injury; he was sidelined until 11 February 2015, when he featured as a substitute in a 3–0 home defeat of Vitória de Setúbal in the semi-finals of the domestic league cup.

On 14 August 2015, Amorim joined Al-Wakrah in Qatar on a season-long deal. On 4 April 2017, after more than a year of inactivity due to a complete rupture of the cruciate ligament in his right knee, the 32-year-old terminated his contract with Benfica and retired.

== International career ==
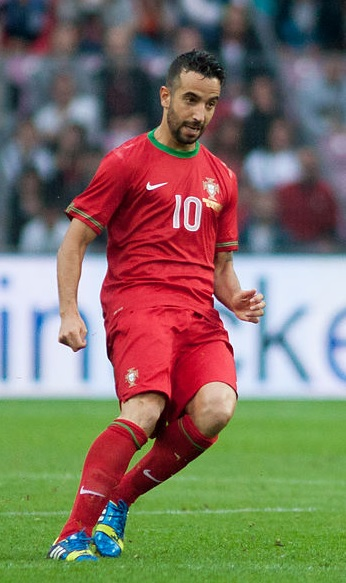
Amorim playing for Portugal in June 2013

Amorim appeared for Portugal at the 2007 UEFA European Under-21 Championship in the Netherlands, as the national side eventually lost to Italy for the final berth for the following year's Summer Olympic Games. On 10 May 2010, although not part of the senior squad's list of 23 for the 2010 FIFA World Cup, he was named in a backup list of six players. On 8 June, he replaced Nani after the Manchester United player sustained a clavicle injury which ruled him out of the finals in South Africa. His senior debut came on the 15th, as he played the last five minutes of the group stage opener against Ivory Coast (0–0) in the place of Raul Meireles.

Amorim was also selected by new manager Paulo Bento for the 2014 World Cup. He made his debut in the tournament on 26 June in the last group phase match against Ghana, featuring the full 90 minutes in the 2–1 win but seeing his team eliminated on goal difference.

== Style of play ==
Amorim's style was similar to countryman Tiago, with both playing the same position, operating in central midfield, both defensive and offensive, although he could also be deployed as a right-back or winger.

== Coaching career ==
=== Early career ===
Shortly after retiring, Amorim joined the Lisbon Football Association in order to earn a coaching licence. Additionally, he attended a postgraduation course in psychomotor education and spent a week-long internship under Manchester United manager José Mourinho.

Amorim started working as a manager in 2018–19, with third division team Casa Pia. After losing his first two games and, with his pride hurt and doubts setting in, he announced if he lost the third game he would quit. In the next match, he changed his system and played a back three for the first time. With the new system working, Casa Pia embarked on an unbeaten run. He also felt he had found the formation that allowed him to produce the football he wanted. In January 2019, the team were deducted six points and he was suspended from all activity for one year after giving instructions during a match without having the required coaching level to do so; even though the bans were suspended shortly after, he presented his resignation in the aftermath.

On 20 May 2019, Amorim initially agreed to return to Benfica as their under-23 coach. The following month, however, after a meeting at the club, he rejected that possibility.

=== Braga ===
In mid-September 2019, Amorim was appointed at Braga's reserves in the third tier, winning seven of his eight games, managing them. Three months later, he replaced the dismissed Ricardo Sá Pinto at the helm of the first team on a two-and-a-half-year contract, with the Minhotos being eighth place in the league at the time of his appointment.

In his first game in charge on 4 January, he led them to a 7–1 away demolition of B SAD, and three weeks later won the domestic league cup final against Porto with a last-minute goal from Ricardo Horta, Braga's first trophy in four years. In the Primeira Liga, on 15 February, Amorim recorded Braga's first win away to Benfica in 65 years, with João Palhinha scoring the game's only goal. He lost his first point in the league, after Braga drew 2–2 at home to Gil Vicente. During this time, he picked up ten wins in 13 games, with Braga being placed third in the league, he only lost two games for the club, in the round of 16 of the 2019–20 UEFA Europa League against Rangers, 3–2 away in the first leg on 20 February, and 1–0 on the return leg at home, a week later.

=== Sporting CP ===
==== 2019–20: Debut season ====
Amorim became Sporting CP's manager on 4 March 2020 after the sacking of Silas, signing a deal until 30 June 2023 with a €20 million buyout clause. Despite only having two years of top-flight experience, Sporting paid €10 million for his services, the third-highest transfer fee for a manager in history.

In his first game in charge on 8 March, he led them to a 2–0 home win against Desportivo das Aves. In the rest of the games he took over, Amorim won six and drew three, but lost to Benfica in the Lisbon derby and rivals Porto at the end of the season, guiding Sporting to a fourth-place finish and qualification to the Europa League third qualifying round. Despite their league finish, Amorim managed to bring a recognisable identity that the club had previously been lacking, despite a toxic atmosphere that had grown around the club since May 2018, after a mob of about 50 club supporters brutally attacked players and staff on the premises of Sporting's training facility.

==== 2020–21: Sporting's first league title in 19 years ====
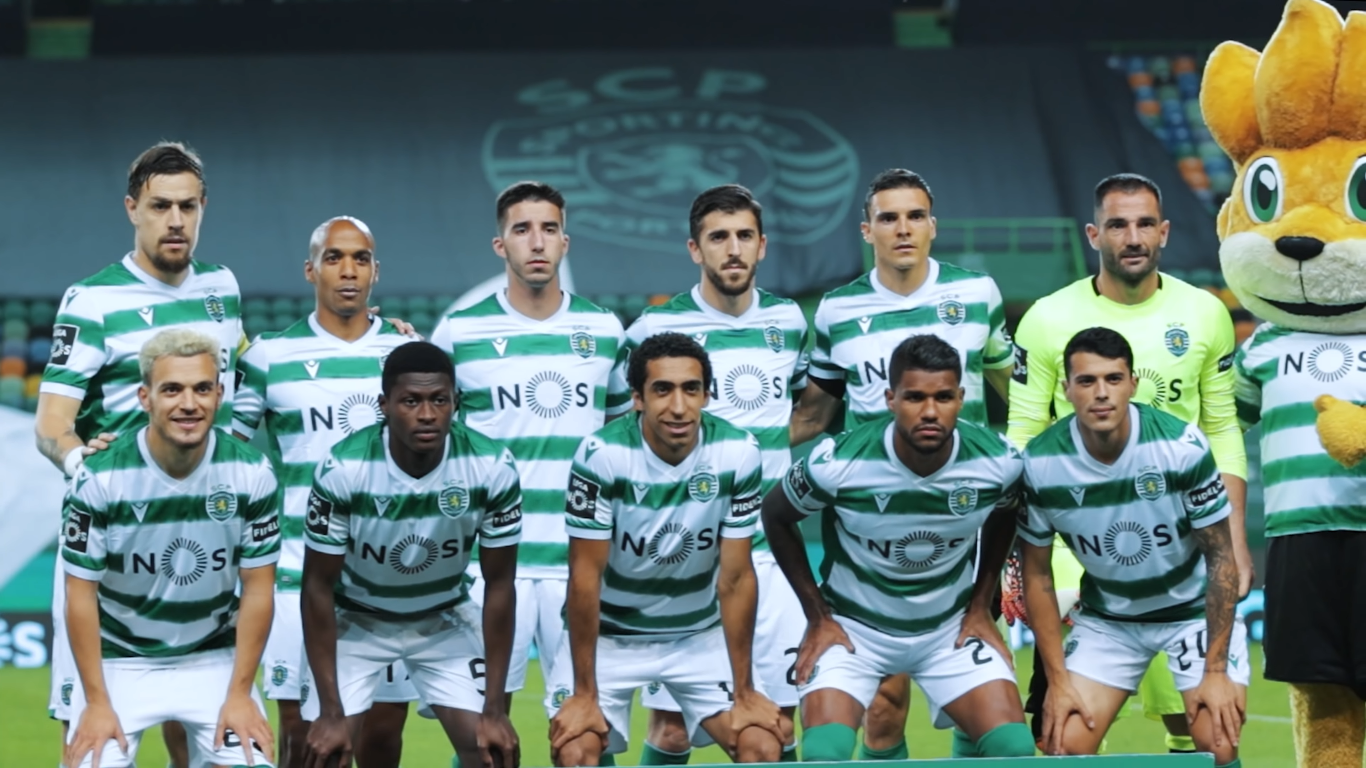
The Sporting CP squad in April 2021.

In the summer transfer window, Jérémy Mathieu retired after suffering a knee injury in training, and was replaced by Zouhair Feddal. Rodrigo Battaglia, Miguel Luís, Luciano Vietto, Wendel and Marcos Acuña departed from the club. Experienced goalkeeper Antonio Adán was brought in as the new first-choice goalkeeper, with other signings including Nuno Santos, Bruno Tabata, Pedro Porro, João Mário and João Palhinha, the last returning from his loan at Braga. At the end of the transfer window, Sporting signed Pedro Gonçalves, who had impressed in the previous season at Famalicão. Along with the new signings, Amorim promoted Daniel Bragança, Gonçalo Inácio, Matheus Nunes, Nuno Mendes and Tiago Tomás to the first-team squad.

"It would be a mistake for us [to be assumed as champions], it has to be game by game [...] when it is mathematically assured, we will be considered candidates"

— Amorim on Sporting's chances of winning the 2020–21 Primeira Liga on 25 April 2021

On 23 January 2021, Amorim won his second consecutive league cup final, against his previous club; both he and Braga manager Carlos Carvalhal were sent to the stands for arguing with each other. On 4 March, he renewed his contract for one more year, with an improved release clause of €30 million. Following a national record of a 32-match unbeaten-streak, including on 11 May, a 1–0 home win against Boavista, he guided the club to their first league title triumph in 19 years, with Pedro Gonçalves finishing as the top scorer of the league with 23 goals and six Sporting players being named in the Primeira Liga Team of the Year. Sporting only had one loss, during the season, being defeated by rivals Benfica 4–3 away in the Lisbon derby on 15 May. At the end of the season, Amorim was named Primeira Liga's Manager of the Month in April and the Primeira Liga's Manager of the Year.

==== 2021–22: European improvement and title challenge ====
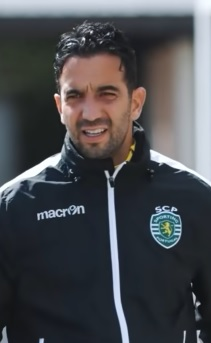
Amorim at a Sporting CP training session in 2021

In his second summer transfer window, Amorim identified the defensive areas which required improvement for the squad, with his options being shorter than Sporting's domestic rivals, leading Ricardo Esgaio to return to the club, midfielder Manuel Ugarte and defender Rúben Vinagre also being signed. After remaining as a back-up to Antonio Adán, Luís Maximiano was sold to Spanish La Liga side Granada, which in turn led to Sporting signing João Virgínia. At the end of the transfer window, starting left-back Nuno Mendes was loaned to Paris Saint-Germain, with Pablo Sarabia moving in the other direction.

Amorim began his second season at Sporting by winning the Supertaça Cândido de Oliveira, on 31 July 2021, in the 2–1 defeat of his former club Braga. After losing their first two Champions League group games, Sporting won their next three matches, culminating on 24 November when they defeated Borussia Dortmund 3–1 at home in the penultimate fixture to ensure the club's qualification to the round of 16, for the first time since the 2008–09 season. On 28 November, Amorim became the fastest manager to win 50 games in the Primeira Liga, following a 2–0 home win against Tondela. On 3 December, he led his squad to their first victory at the Estádio da Luz in six years, following a 3–1 away defeat of rivals Benfica in the Lisbon derby.

On 29 January 2022, Amorim won his third consecutive league cup final, in a 2–1 victory against Benfica. Sporting were eliminated in the last 16 of the Champions League by Manchester City, 5–0 on aggregate, knocked out of the Taça de Portugal in the semi-finals by Porto, and finished the league season on 85 points as the year before, but six points behind aforementioned rival.

==== 2022–23: European and domestic disappointment ====
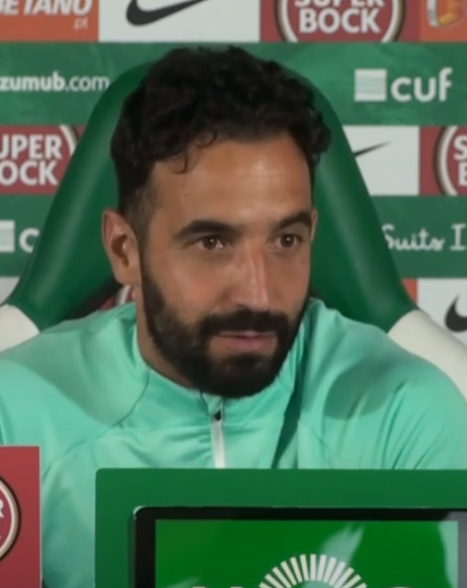
Amorim in November 2022

Sporting's success inevitably attracted richer clubs in Europe to their players, and the summer transfer window saw an exodus of key players: João Palhinha and Matheus Nunes to Premier League sides Fulham and Wolverhampton Wanderers, respectively, and Nuno Mendes completing a permanent move to Paris Saint-Germain, after a one-year loan spell. However, Amorim successfully adapted his side, despite a difficult start to the new season, including a 3–3 away draw to Braga and two consecutive losses to Porto (3–0) and Chaves (2–0), with the side being placed 13th in the league table. Referring to the departures of both Nunes and Palhinha, claimed he "failed to plan [summer transfer window] and had to pay attention to now, in this end of the market, is to be sure where [Sporting] are going, not to think that [Sporting] have to save now everything that was changed in a one-year planning".

Despite their league form, on 7 September, Sporting won in Germany for the first time in their history, beating Europa League champions Eintracht Frankfurt 3–0 in their first group stage match of the 2022–23 UEFA Champions League, followed by surprising victory at home over Tottenham Hotspur in their next fixture. The following group stages matches, were marked by two individual errors from Antonio Adán and Ricardo Esgaio, which saw them lose twice to Marseille 4–1 and 2–0, respectively, with Esgaio coming through to a lot of scrutiny, from the club supporters, which led to Amorim defend him, saying: "He's not one of the fans' favorite players, but he's one of mine. As long as I am here, I will protect him as much as possible. He will never be abandoned by the manager and as long as I'm here there's nothing you can do to Esgaio". Both losses, were followed by a surprise elimination from the third round of the Taça de Portugal to Liga 3 side Varzim, after a narrow 1–0 loss. After losing 2–1 at home to Eintracht Frankfurt on 1 November, Sporting finished third in the group stage, which put them in the Europa League knockout round play-offs.

Despite a difficult league season, Amorim guided Sporting to their third and Amorim's fourth consecutive league cup final, where they lost 2–0 to Porto in Leiria, who won tournament for the first time. Shortly after, the club also featured the departure of Pedro Porro to Tottenham Hotspur on 31 January 2023, the deadline day of the winter transfer window. In the Europa League, Amorim led Sporting to the quarter-finals, following a surprise victory over favourites Arsenal on penalties, after drawing 3–3 on aggregate in London. They were eliminated in the following round, after losing to Juventus 2–1 on aggregate at home. Following a 2–2 home draw with Benfica in the Primeira Liga, despite leading 2–0 at half-time, Sporting missed out on Champions League qualification and qualified to the Europa League, after a 4th-place finish in the league. After failing to qualify for the Champions League, he admitted that he put his position at risk, despite having the trust of the club's president, who labelled him as 'one of the best coaches in the world', citing the poor planning of the season, especially the departure of Matheus Nunes to Wolverhampton Wanderers as one of the factors for the failure of the objectives.

==== 2023–24: Second league title ====
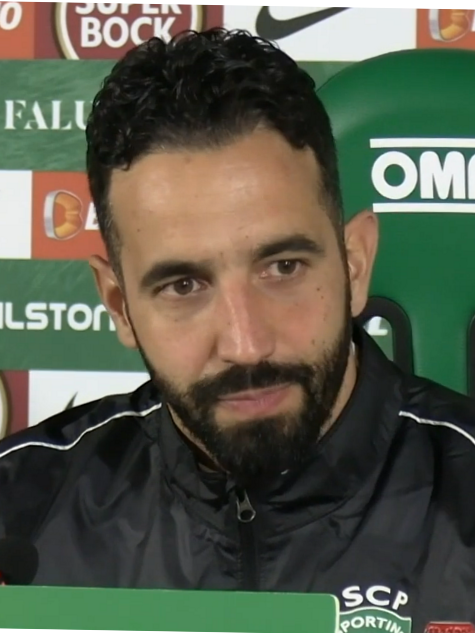
Amorim in January 2024

During the summer transfer window of 2023, Sporting broke the club's transfer record by signing Coventry City striker Viktor Gyökeres for €20 million. On 12 August, Sporting opened their 2023–24 campaign with a 3–2 league victory at home to Vizela, with Sporting's record signing Gyökeres scoring a brace. Amorim's team lost the Lisbon derby against Benfica away by two late goals at stoppage time on 12 November after Sporting's one-goal halftime lead from a Viktor Gyökeres goal, despite the visitors being reduced to 10 men for practically the whole of the second half. But on 18 December, Amorim's Sporting defeated Porto at the Estádio José Alvalade by 2–0, with goals from Gyökeres and Pedro Gonçalves, to end Sporting's eight-game straight winless run against Porto in the Primeira Liga. The win also resulted in Sporting overtaking their rivals Benfica at the top of the table.

Amorim led Sporting to their biggest Primeira Liga margin of victory since 2018, following of an 8–0 thrashing of Casa Pia, their second of the season, following a similar score against Dumiense at Taça de Portugal, early in the season. Over the following months, Amorim was heavily linked to take over as the new manager of English Premier League club Liverpool, following the departure of long-serving manager Jürgen Klopp and when previous favourite Xabi Alonso publicly announced he was staying at Bayer Leverkusen amid interest before the role ultimately went to then Feyenoord coach Arne Slot. On 2 April 2024, Amorim led Sporting to the Taça de Portugal final by drawing 2–2 away at Benfica, resulting in a 4–3 aggregate win, and secured Sporting a stoppage time 2–1 home win in the league four days later, to increase their lead at the top of the table.

Shortly after, Amorim went on a trip to London to negotiate with West Ham United to take over as their new manager for next season, with then manager David Moyes being set to leave. However, Amorim refused the offer, and ahead of an important league match with Porto, he publicly apologised for the trip, deeming it a mistake and that the timing was wrong. The match against Porto on 29 April ended in a 2–2, with Sporting being two goals down at halftime and Viktor Gyökeres scoring goals in the 87th and 88th minutes. On 5 May, Sporting mathematically secured their 20th Primeira Liga title, and second title under Amorim, following Benfica's defeat to Famalicão. Afterwards, during the club's title celebration, Amorim confirmed he would continue as manager of Sporting for the next season. In the Taça de Portugal final, on 26 May, Sporting were defeated by Porto 2–1 in extra-time.

==== 2024–25: Final season in Lisbon ====
Amorim adopted a small change to his tactics for the new season, with his team being more dominant in possession and with a big emphasis on high pressing, compared to his pragmatic approach used in his previous seasons managing the club. The summer transfer window, saw the departure of club captain Sebastián Coates, with Sporting signed ball playing centre-back Zeno Debast to replace him, Amorim also promoted Geovany Quenda to the first-team squad, playing him as a right wing-back, despite being a natural right winger and Morten Hjulmand was also promoted as the new club captain. Sporting also brought in Conrad Harder as a signing for the future to develop under Amorim and to serve as back-up striker for Viktor Gyökeres. In his first match of the new season, on 3 August, Sporting suffered a 4–3 loss to rivals Porto in the 2024 Supertaça Cândido de Oliveira, despite leading the game by three goals. The following months, he was mentioned as a possible successor to Pep Guardiola at Manchester City, when Sporting's director of football Hugo Viana replaced Txiki Begiristain as City's director of football.

On 29 October, following the dismissal of Manchester United manager Erik ten Hag, Sporting confirmed that the English club were set to trigger Amorim's €10 million release clause. After guiding Sporting to a 3–1 victory over Nacional in the quarter-finals of the Taça da Liga, he addressed United's interest saying, "It's a negotiation between two clubs. It's never easy, even with the [release] clauses. They have to talk. We will have clarification after the game [against Estrela da Amadora], it will be clear. So it's one more day and after the game tomorrow, we will have a decision made".

After the two clubs agreed on a fee for Amorim's departure, in his last home match for the club, on 5 November, he led Sporting to a 4–1 home win against Manchester City, marking the third time that a team managed by Pep Guardiola conceded four goals in a UEFA Champions League match. In the 2024–25 Primeira Liga, Amorim's Sporting won their first ten matches to move three points clear at the top of the table, his side also led the league for most goals scored and least goals conceded. Amorim was named Primeira Liga Manager of the Month for three consecutive months in August, September and October. On 10 November, he managed his final match for Sporting, leading his team to a 4–2 victory against his former club Braga, after being two goals down at halftime. This win allowed Amorim to match the best league start in the club's history, with 11 consecutive victories. The achievement equalled the record set by Marinho Peres during the 1990–91 season. Amorim was succeeded by João Pereira, whom he met in Benfica's youth teams and later managed in Sporting during the latter's final season as a player.

=== Manchester United ===
==== 2024–25: Europa League final amidst domestic struggles ====
On 1 November 2024, Premier League club Manchester United announced they had appointed Amorim as new head coach on a contract running until 2027, and that he would begin his tenure at the club on 11 November.

Amorim's debut was a 1–1 away draw with Ipswich Town on 24 November. Four days later, he secured his first win as Manchester United head coach against Bodø/Glimt in the UEFA Europa League league stage. On 1 December, Amorim won his first game in the Premier League against Everton, beating them 4–0 at Old Trafford. On 15 December, Amorim became the first Manchester United manager to win his first Manchester derby since Alex Ferguson in a 2–1 away win against Manchester City.

On 19 January 2025, Amorim labelled his team as "probably the worst team in the history" of the club after their 3–1 defeat to Brighton in the Premier League. The defeat was the club's fourth in its past five games at Old Trafford. Towards the end of the season, United's league form collapsed, earning just four points from their final six matches, leaving them mathematically confirmed to finish in the bottom half of the Premier League table. Amorim's only remaining hope to salvage the season came in the UEFA Europa League, where on 21 May, he led United to the final against Tottenham Hotspur, where the winner would earn a place in the following season's UEFA Champions League, while the loser would be left without European football entirely. At the match, United were defeated 1–0, compounding a disappointing season that saw them lose to Tottenham Hotspur for the fourth time that season. With no trophies, no European qualification, and a string of heavy defeats, Amorim's first season ended in failure, being widely condemned by the media as one of the worst campaigns in Manchester United's history.

==== 2025–26: Final months at Old Trafford ====
The 2025–26 season was originally intended to be Amorim's first full season with United. Despite a productive summer transfer window that included the signings of Benjamin Sesko, Bryan Mbeumo, Matheus Cunha and Senne Lammens, United suffered a bad start to the season, exiting from the EFL Cup on 27 August, against EFL League Two side Grimsby Town after a shock 12–11 defeat on penalties, after the game finished 2–2 at full time. Grimsby Town went up 2–0 at half time. However, results began improving, on 20 October, with Amorim coaching United's first away win at Anfield against arch-rivals Liverpool since 2016, emerging victorious 2–1. With United also winning against Brighton and Sunderland in October, Amorim won his first Premier League Manager of the Month award.

From November onwards, the club won only three matches in eleven. The last of those eleven matches was on 4 January 2026, when Amorim coached a 1–1 away draw at Elland Road against rivals Leeds United. Afterwards, in the post-match press conference, he publicly declared that he was hired as the manager, not just a head coach, and effectively demanded that the scouting department and sporting director, Jason Wilcox, "do their jobs". He noted that while his name was not "[Thomas] Tuchel, [Antonio] Conte or [José] Mourinho" he expected full control of the team. He also added that he would do his job for exactly 18 months and "then we move on". Amorim criticised the influence of former United players working in the media, including Gary Neville and Paul Scholes, claiming that "if people cannot handle the Gary Nevilles and the critics of everything, [United] needed to change the club". The next day, the club announced that Amorim had departed with immediate effect.

Amorim left the club in sixth place in the league with a record of 24 wins, 18 draws and 21 losses in 63 games in all competitions and a win percentage of 38%, the lowest of any permanent Manchester United manager since the retirement of Alex Ferguson and second-lowest after Ralf Rangnick (37%), who served as an interim manager. He was succeeded by Darren Fletcher on a caretaker basis, and Michael Carrick permanently.

=== AC Milan ===
On 16 June 2026, Serie A club AC Milan appointed Amorim as new head coach on a contract running until 2028, replacing outgoing manager Massimiliano Allegri.

He took charge of his first match on 23 August guiding Milan to a 2–1 away win away against Torino, becoming the first manager to win his opening Serie A match in charge of Milan since Leonardo in August 2009. In his second game, on 28 August, he guided the club to a 2–0 win home against Venezia. He became the third AC Milan manager (after Alberto Zaccheroni in 1998 and Filippo Inzaghi in 2014) in the three-points-for-a-win era to win his first two Serie A matches when taking charge at the start of a season.

== Manager profile ==
=== Tactics ===
Amorim speaking as the Sporting CP manager during a press conference at Estádio José Alvalade.

Amorim is known for his communication skills and tactical knowledge. Exuding a positive outlook and a laid-back, conciliatory demeanor, Amorim has consistently emphasised that he refrains from engaging in discussions about referees with the media. Described as being "transparent and straightforward", he rarely gives interviews outside of his contracted duties and always credits his players for his achievements rather than talking up his own credentials. At Sporting CP, he built a collective spirit that made every player feel like a vital thread in the fabric of the club. Amorim's approach is rooted in a belief that a squad must function as more than a sum of its parts; it must breathe as one. He treats his players as people first, athletes second. At Sporting, his leadership style fostered a sense of camaraderie that went beyond the locker room; it extended into the lives of his players.

Amorim considers Jorge Jesus as his teacher, mentor, and one of his main influences. Amorim played under Jesus for close to a decade at Belenenses and Benfica. He also considers José Mourinho as one of his biggest mentors and has displayed an admiration for Pep Guardiola. Amorim himself said, "There are coaches who have a way of watching the game that I like, like Guardiola, but for me, the role model is Mourinho, because I watch the ball in a way that's more similar to [Mourinho], that is, he analyses the opponents very well and sets his team up, not just with a certain style of play but thinking a lot about how to adapt to win."

"His playing style is clearly pragmatic. He is a studious coach with the capacity for work and a lot of intuition. He is contagious with his will to win [...] and with the conviction that only with hard work from everyone is this possible."

— Paulo Meneses, head of recruitment for Braga, on Amorim

During his tenure with Sporting CP beginning in March 2020, Amorim primarily played a 3–4–3, a system he adopted during his tenure at Casa Pia and Braga, with two midfielders, usually João Palhinha and Matheus Nunes, and later, Morten Hjulmand and Hidemasa Morita in the following seasons, being responsible for protecting the defense, and emphasise the attacking capabilities of the wing-backs, like Pedro Porro and Nuno Mendes at first, and later Geny Catamo. When defending in a low block, Sporting's players stay behind the line of the box in order to keep a compact shape, prevent any potential shots from the edge of the box, and limit attacking opportunities. Amorim's team utilises an intense pressing style and attempts to win the ball back in the final third.

Amorim's team use interchanging movements to distract the opposing defenders and create space for the attackers to exploit. They focus on exploiting the wings and half-spaces (with players like Pedro Gonçalves playing inside with Pablo Sarabia and Nuno Santos sticking to the left side of the attack). The number 9, firstly Paulinho and then Gyökeres after the signing of the Swede in 2023, is the only player who tends to act in terms of pressing the ball and slowing the progression of the opposition, looking to create a space in the defensive line of the opposition that can be quickly attacked, in order to allow the man in possession initially to look for a vertical passing option. Amorim has also a 3–4–3 diamond formation with three mobile defenders; plus one more covering space – becoming, in effect, a defensive midfielder, two "controlling" midfielders with responsibilities to feed the attack-minded players, one second striker, two touchline-hugging wingers and one versatile centre forward.

=== Reception ===
Amorim is often credited with rejuvenating Sporting CP by promoting young talents, instilling a winning mentality, and developing a versatile and cohesive style of play. José Mourinho insisted that "Amorim would never change his approach regardless of the opposition and his tactics provide depth for the wingers and the striker", leading to describe Amorim's style as "always intense".

Former Estoril head coach stated that Amorim's teams reflect his work ethic, with "he is always trying to improve his players [...] works with young talent but also with experienced players as well and what they all have in common is that they fight [...] I think he wins a lot with his communication, his message is clear and it is easy to understand. The players connect with him easily. Even on the outside, for the reporters and the public, it is really simple and really concrete". In April 2023, Manchester United player and fellow compatriot Bruno Fernandes praised Amorim's management style, believing that his skill set is adaptable to leagues outside of Portugal and had all the qualities "to be able to succeed in English, French, or Spanish football". Amorim was described by Guillem Balagué of BBC Sport as a coach who's "still adding layers of knowledge to his methods but he still believes football only makes sense if those watching are thrilled by it".

However at Manchester United, Amorim was criticised for his handling of academy players. In December 2025, he claimed that 18-year-old defender Harry Amass was "struggling in the Championship" with Sheffield Wednesday, although Amass was at the time the club's player of the month. He also claimed that 18-year-old forward Chido Obi was "not always a starter in the Under-21s", which he and his team were reportedly unhappy with.

Amorim was also heavily criticised for his devotion to a 3–4–3 system that the squad was never built to execute. His tactical inflexibility became a constant source of frustration for critics, most notably in a Premier League match against Everton, where despite playing the majority of the match with an extra man, Amorim did not alter his shape, keeping three centre-backs and two wing-backs on the pitch even when the situation screamed for a more attacking approach — a decision that drew fierce criticism from Gary Neville, who had grown increasingly vocal in his disapproval as results deteriorated throughout the season. Paul Scholes, another former United player, was similarly scathing, feeling that Amorim was betraying the club's identity and deeply ingrained attacking principles. Amorim's insistence on sticking with the system eventually led to a run of poor performances that ultimately made his position untenable.

== Personal life ==
Amorim was born in Lisbon. His parents divorced when he was a year old. Amorim's cousins, David Simão and Bruno Simão, are also professional footballers. He is godfather to Bruno Simão's eldest daughter.

Amorim has two children. He is married to Maria João Diogo and they have one son together. Their wedding took place at the Palácio e Mosteiro de São Marcos (Saint Mark Palace and Monastery) in Coimbra. Maria João Diogo has an academic degree in telecommunications engineering and has built her own business in interior design. She is the sister-in-law of Antero Henrique, former sporting director of Paris Saint-Germain and responsible for the most expensive transfer ever, the transfer of footballer Neymar to the French football club for €222 million in 2017. Another sister of Maria João Diogo's, Inês, is married to a former Braga, Sporting CP and Benfica footballer, Luís Filipe.

== Career statistics ==
=== Club ===
Appearances and goals by club, season and competition
Club	Season	League			Taça de Portugal		Taça da Liga		Continental		Other		Total	
Club	Season	Division	Apps	Goals	Apps	Goals	Apps	Goals	Apps	Goals	Apps	Goals	Apps	Goals
Belenenses	2003–04	Primeira Liga	2	0		0	0		0	0	–		2	0
Belenenses	2004–05	Primeira Liga	17	0		0	0		0	0	–		17	0
Belenenses	2005–06	Primeira Liga	25	3	1	0	0		0	0	–		26	3
Belenenses	2006–07	Primeira Liga	23	1	6	1	0		0	0	–		29	2
Belenenses	2007–08	Primeira Liga	29	0	1	0	0		2 (Note: Appearances in UEFA Cup)	0	–		32	0
Belenenses	Total		96	4	8	1	0	0	2	0	0	0	106	5
Benfica	2008–09	Primeira Liga	26	2	2	0	5	0	2	0	–		35	2
Benfica	2009–10	Primeira Liga	24	3	2	0	2	1	10 (Note: Appearances in UEFA Europa League)	0	–		38	4
Benfica	2010–11	Primeira Liga	12	0	2	0	1	0	2 (Note: Appearances in UEFA Champions League)	0	1 (Note: Appearances in Supertaça Cândido de Oliveira)	0	18	0
Benfica	2011–12	Primeira Liga	6	0	2	0	0	0	6	0	–		14	0
Benfica	2013–14	Primeira Liga	17	0	6	0	5	0	9 (Note: Two appearances in UEFA Champions League, seven appearances in UEFA Europa League)	0	–		37	0
Benfica	2014–15	Primeira Liga	10	0	0	0	1	0	0	0	1	0	12	0
Benfica	Total		95	5	14	0	14	1	29	0	2	0	154	6
Benfica B	2014–15	Segunda Liga	2	0	—						–		2	0
Braga (loan)	2011–12	Primeira Liga	8	0	0				2	0	–		10	0
Braga (loan)	2012–13	Primeira Liga	22	4	3	0	4	1	7	0	–		36	5
Braga (loan)	Total		30	4	3	0	4	1	9	0			46	5
Al-Wakrah (loan)	2015–16	Qatar Stars League	14	2	—								14	2
Career total			237	15	25	1	18	2	40	0	2	0	322	18

=== International ===
Appearances and goals by national team and year
National team	Year	Apps	Goals
Portugal	2010	1	0
Portugal	2011	0	0
Portugal	2012	3	0
Portugal	2013	6	0
Portugal	2014	4	0
Total		14	0

== Managerial statistics ==
As of match played 22 November 2026

Managerial record by team and tenure
Team	From	To	Record					Ref.
Team	From	To	P	W	D	L	Win %	Ref.
Casa Pia	1 July 2018	7 January 2019	4	3	0	1	75.00	
Braga B	16 September 2019	23 December 2019	11	8	2	1	72.73	
Braga	23 December 2019	4 March 2020	13	10	1	2	76.92	
Sporting CP	4 March 2020	10 November 2024	231	164	34	33	71.00	
Manchester United	11 November 2024	5 January 2026	63	24	18	21	38.10	
AC Milan	16 June 2026	present	16	9	3	4	56.25	
Career total			338	218	58	62	64.50	

== Honours ==
=== Player ===
Benfica

- Primeira Liga: 2009–10, 2013–14, 2014–15
- Taça de Portugal: 2013–14
- Taça da Liga: 2008–09, 2009–10, 2010–11, 2013–14, 2014–15
- Supertaça Cândido de Oliveira: 2014
- UEFA Europa League runner-up: 2013–14

Braga

- Taça da Liga: 2012–13

=== Manager ===
Braga

- Taça da Liga: 2019–20

Sporting CP

- Primeira Liga: 2020–21, 2023–24
- Taça da Liga: 2020–21, 2021–22
- Supertaça Cândido de Oliveira: 2021

Manchester United

- UEFA Europa League runner-up: 2024–25

Individual

- Primeira Liga Manager of the Month: February 2021, April 2021, October/November 2021, September 2023, December 2023, January 2024, March 2024, August 2024, September/October 2024
- Primeira Liga's Manager of the Season: 2021, 2024
- Premier League Manager of the Month: October 2025
