= Dolores Aveiro =

Portuguese businesswoman and writer (born 1954)

- Born: Maria Dolores dos Santos Aveiro; 31 December 1954 (age 71); Caniçal, Machico, Madeira Island
- Citizenship: Portuguese
- Occupations: Businessperson, social media influencer and writer
- Partner: José Andrade (2006–present)
- Children: Elma, Hugo, Kátia and Cristiano Ronaldo

Maria Dolores dos Santos Aveiro (born 31 December 1954) is a Portuguese businesswoman, social media influencer and writer. She is widely known as the mother of Portuguese international footballer Cristiano Ronaldo, having been one of the main sources of support throughout his sporting career.

== Biography ==
=== Early life ===
Born in Caniçal, on the Madeira Island, Dolores Aveiro grew up in a family facing severe financial difficulties. She was orphaned at the age of six, when her mother died prematurely at the age of 37. Following her mother's death, her father remarried a woman who already had five children. During this period, Dolores was subjected to mistreatment by her stepmother. She subsequently went to live in an orphanage, enduring a childhood marked by hunger and extreme poverty.

=== Marriage and family ===
She married José Diniz Aveiro (died 2005). Their marriage was marked by severe financial difficulties and episodes of domestic violence. The couple had four children: Elma (born 1973), Hugo (born 1975), Kátia (born 1977) and Cristiano Ronaldo (born 1985).

At the age of 30, amid financial hardship, Dolores considered terminating her fourth pregnancy. After unsuccessfully attempting home remedies to induce an abortion, she sought medical assistance and was advised by a healthcare professional to continue the pregnancy to term.

Since March 2006, she has been in a relationship with José Andrade, a former member of the National Republican Guard (GNR).

=== Public profile and career ===
Over the years, Aveiro has become a prominent figure in the international media, building a strong online presence and amassing millions of followers on social media.

In 2014, she released her official autobiography, Mãe Coragem – A vida, a força e a fé de uma lutadora (Courageous Mother – The Life, Strength and Faith of a Fighter), co-written with author Paulo Sousa Costa. In the book, she recounts the experiences of raising her children, the hardships of poverty during her youth and her personal battle with breast cancer.

In March 2020, she suffered an ischemic stroke on Madeira Island. The incident attracted international media coverage and messages of support from figures in sport and international politics during her hospital recovery.

On 16 November 2026, Dolores Aveiro was honoured by Leões de Portugal, an association affiliated with Sporting CP which, in addition to supporting the elderly, has awarded scholarships since 1985, having helped more than a thousand young people. At a ceremony held at the Estádio José Alvalade, the name of Cristiano Ronaldo's mother, a former Sporting player, was given to the association's day centre, one day after the facility's 22nd anniversary.
