= Mário Lino (footballer) =

Portuguese footballer and manager

Personal information
- Full name: Mário Goulart Lino
- Date of birth: 9 January 1937 (age 89)
- Place of birth: Horta, Azores, Portugal
- Position: Right back

Senior career*
| Years | Team | Apps | (Gls) |
| 1952–1954 | Fayal | | |
| 1954–1958 | Lusitânia | | |
| 1958–1967 | Sporting CP | 127 | (4) |

International career
| 1961–1962 | Portugal | 6 | (0) |

Managerial career
- 1967–1968: Sporting CP U19
- 1969: Sporting CP
- 1972–1974: Sporting CP
- 1974–1975: Farense
- 1975–1976: Vitória de Setúbal
- 1976–1977: Braga
- 1977–1979: Portimonense
- 1979–1980: Boavista
- 1980–1981: Braga
- 1981–1982: Boavista
- 1982–1984: Marítimo
- 1984–1985: Olhanense
- 1985–1986: Águeda
- 1986–1987: Beira-Mar
- 1988: Barreirense
- 1988–1990: Peniche
- * Club domestic league appearances and goals

Mário Goulart Lino (born 9 January 1937) is a former Portuguese footballer who played as right back and manager.

== Career ==
Mário Lino began playing football with Faial and S.C. Lusitânia before starring with Sporting Clube de Portugal.
