= Cândido de Oliveira =

Portuguese footballer and sports journalist (1896–1958)

Personal information
- Full name: Cândido Plácido Fernandes de Oliveira
- Date of birth: 24 September 1896
- Place of birth: Fronteira, Portugal
- Date of death: 23 June 1958 (aged 61)
- Place of death: Stockholm, Sweden
- Position: Midfielder

Senior career*
Years	Team	Apps	(Gls)
1914–1920	Benfica		
1920–1926	Casa Pia		

International career
1921	Portugal	1	(0)

Managerial career
- 1926–1929: Portugal
- 1935–1945: Portugal
- 1937–1938: Belenenses
- 1945–1946: Sporting
- 1947–1949: Sporting
- 1950: Flamengo
- 1952: Portugal
- 1952–1953: Porto
- 1956–1958: Académica de Coimbra
- * Club domestic league appearances and goals

Cândido Plácido Fernandes de Oliveira (24 September 1896 – 23 June 1958) was a Portuguese football player, coach, and sports journalist.

The Portuguese Super Cup is named after him, being officially known as Supertaça Cândido de Oliveira.

== Life and career ==
Oliveira was educated at Casa Pia. He played for Benfica from 1911 to 1920, moving then to Casa Pia in 1920, of which he was one of the founders. He had his only cap for the Portugal national team, in the first game ever of the Selecção das Quinas, on 18 December 1921, a 1–3 loss to Spain in Madrid, a game which he captained.

Oliveira was also a coach of Sporting and was in charge, for several times, of the Portugal national squad, including at the 1928 Olympics.

He was one of the founders of the sports newspaper A Bola in 1945. He also published several books about football.

His opposition to the Portuguese dictatorship landed him several stays in prison, including an imprisonment at the infamous Tarrafal prison.

== Death ==
Oliveira died on 23 June 1958 in Stockholm, Sweden, of lung disease when he was covering the 1958 FIFA World Cup for A Bola. He felt ill a few days before, and even received hospital care, but his spirit of mission brought him back to the stadiums and when he returned to the hospital it was too late.
