= Bino (footballer, born 1940) =

Portuguese footballer (born 1950)

Personal information
- Full name: Albino Aguiar de Sousa
- Date of birth: 6 June 1940 (age 86)
- Place of birth: Portugal
- Position: Midfielder

Senior career*
Years	Team	Apps	(Gls)
1960–1973	Braga	200	(44)
1973–1974	Riopele		
1974–1975	Rio Ave	1	(0)
- * Club domestic league appearances and goals

Albino Aguiar de Sousa (born 6 June 1940), known as Bino, is a Portuguese former footballer who played as a midfielder.

== Career ==
Bino started his career with Braga, helping the club achieve promotion from the second tier to the top flight and win the 1966 Taça de Portugal. Altogether, he made two hundred league appearances and scored forty-four goals while playing for them.

In 1973, he signed for Riopele. One year later, he signed for Rio Ave where he made one league appearance before retiring from professional football.

== Style of play ==
Bino played as a midfielder and was nicknamed "Bino Trivelas" because he was known for his trivela ability.
