= Rui Sim-Sim =

Portuguese footballer (1934–2013)

Rui Bernardino Matado Sim-Sim (1934 – 8 August 2013) was a Portuguese football player and manager.

Born in Almada, Sim-Sim played for local Cova da Piedade before joining Braga. In 1965–66, his final season as a player, he was assistant manager to Manuel Palmeira, who had replaced José Valle halfway through the campaign. On 22 May 1966, Braga won their first Taça de Portugal with a 1–0 win over Vitória de Setúbal; Sim-Sim is described by different sources as either Palmeira's assistant, a joint manager, or the manager of the side. A January 2013 retrospective by the University of Minho makes no reference to Sim-Sim, referring only to Palmeira as manager. Carlos Canário, captain of the winning team, told Record in 2015 "It happened because we, in the Taça de Portugal, having already finished the league campaign, created a strong mentality with the new manager, Rui Sim-Sim, who was our teammate and ended up taking over the team".
