= Jorge Jesus =

Portuguese football manager (born 1954)

Jorge Jesus ComIH
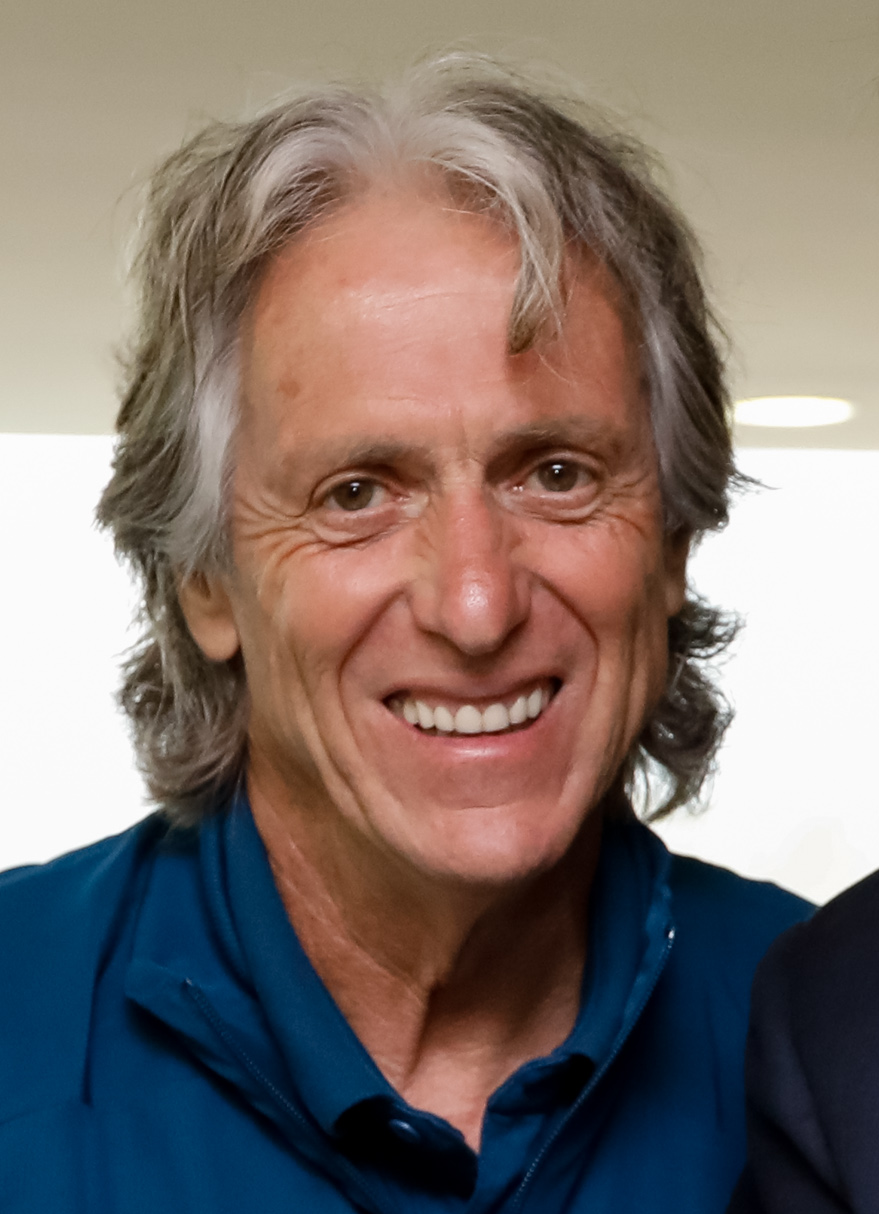
- Jesus in 2020

Personal information
- Full name: Jorge Fernando Pinheiro de Jesus
- Date of birth: 24 July 1954 (age 72)
- Place of birth: Amadora, Portugal
- Height: 1.75 m (5 ft 9 in)
- Position: Right midfielder

Team information
- Current team: Portugal (head coach)

Youth career
- 1969–1971: Estrela da Amadora
- 1971–1973: Sporting CP

Senior career*
| Years | Team | Apps | (Gls) |
| 1973–1976 | Sporting CP | 12 | (1) |
| 1973–1974 | → Peniche (loan) | | |
| 1974–1975 | → Olhanense (loan) | 29 | (5) |
| 1976–1977 | Belenenses | 13 | (0) |
| 1977–1978 | Riopele | 28 | (3) |
| 1978–1979 | Juventude de Évora | | |
| 1979–1980 | União Leiria | 22 | (1) |
| 1980–1983 | Vitória Setúbal | 38 | (4) |
| 1983–1984 | Farense | 24 | (0) |
| 1984–1987 | Estrela da Amadora | | |
| 1987–1988 | Atlético | | |
| 1988–1989 | Benfica Castelo Branco | | |
| 1989–1990 | Almancilense | | |

Managerial career
- 1990–1993: Amora
- 1993–1996: Felgueiras
- 1997–1998: Felgueiras
- 1998: União Madeira
- 1998–2000: Estrela da Amadora
- 2000–2002: Vitória Setúbal
- 2002–2003: Estrela da Amadora
- 2003–2004: Vitória Guimarães
- 2005: Moreirense
- 2005–2006: União Leiria
- 2006–2008: Belenenses
- 2008–2009: Braga
- 2009–2015: Benfica
- 2015–2018: Sporting CP
- 2018–2019: Al-Hilal
- 2019–2020: Flamengo
- 2020–2021: Benfica
- 2022–2023: Fenerbahçe
- 2023–2025: Al-Hilal
- 2025–2026: Al-Nassr
- 2026–: Portugal
- * Club domestic league appearances and goals

Jorge Fernando Pinheiro de Jesus ComIH (Portuguese pronunciation: [ˈʒɔɾʒɨ ʒɨˈzuʃ]; born 24 July 1954) is a Portuguese professional football manager and former player who is the head coach of the Portugal national team.

Jesus started his career with Sporting CP, going on to play for 12 other clubs in 17 years as a professional, which included nine Primeira Liga seasons.

Jesus began a coaching career in 1990, and his first stop in the main category was with Felgueiras in the 1995–96 campaign. He went on to work with several teams, arriving at Benfica in 2009 and winning ten trophies (a club record for a single manager, winning all domestic trophies at least once) as well as reaching two UEFA Europa League finals with them in six seasons. He became manager of Flamengo in 2019 and won the Copa Libertadores and Campeonato Brasileiro Série A in his first year. He returned to Benfica in 2020 but did not win a trophy despite a Portuguese record investment during the COVID-19 pandemic. In 2022, he joined Turkish club Fenerbahçe before going on to have spells in charge of Saudi Pro League clubs Al-Hilal and Al-Nassr, winning the domestic title with both. In July 2026, he was named the manager of the Portugal national team.

Jesus was twice considered one of the ten best club coaches in the world by the International Federation of Football History & Statistics, in 2013 (eighth place) and in 2019 (7th place).

== Playing career ==
Jesus, son of Virgolino António de Jesus who played for Sporting CP in the 1940s, was born in Amadora, Lisbon, and finished his football formation with the same club, making his top flight debut with Olhanense on loan from the Lions.

He played with Sporting's first team in the 1975–76 season, appearing in 12 matches and starting once as the Lisbon club finished in fifth place. Subsequently, released, he played in the country's top flight in seven of the following eight years, representing Belenenses, Grupo Desportivo Riopele, Juventude de Évora, União de Leiria, Vitória de Setúbal and Farense, amassing totals in the category of 166 games and 14 goals.

Jesus retired in 1990 at the age of 36, after spells in the second (mainly with his hometown Estrela da Amadora) and third levels.

== Managerial career ==
=== Early years ===
After starting as a manager with lowly Amora, Jesus moved in December 1993 to Felgueiras as a replacement for Rodolfo Reis, helping the club promote to the top flight in his second season and being in and out of the team until January 1998, with Felgueiras back in division two.

Subsequently, he led former team Estrela da Amadora to two consecutive eighth-place finishes in the first division and, in quick succession, managed both Vitória de Setúbal and Amadora, celebrating top flight promotions with both even though he was fired by the latter in March 2003. In 2003–04 he helped Vitória de Guimarães narrowly avoid relegation, finishing two points ahead of first relegated team Alverca.

In the following four years, always in division one, Jesus was in charge of Moreirense (suffering relegation), União de Leiria and Belenenses, finishing fifth with the latter and qualifying to the UEFA Cup, and adding a presence in the 2007 Portuguese Cup final, losing 0–1 to Sporting.

On 20 May 2008, one day after leaving Belenenses, Jesus took over at Braga, leading the Minho side to the fifth position in the league and the round-of-16 in the UEFA Cup. Highlights in the latter competition included a 3–0 home win against Portsmouth and a last-minute 0–1 defeat to Milan at the San Siro. He won the last edition of the UEFA Intertoto Cup, something never achieved by other Portuguese club.

=== Benfica ===
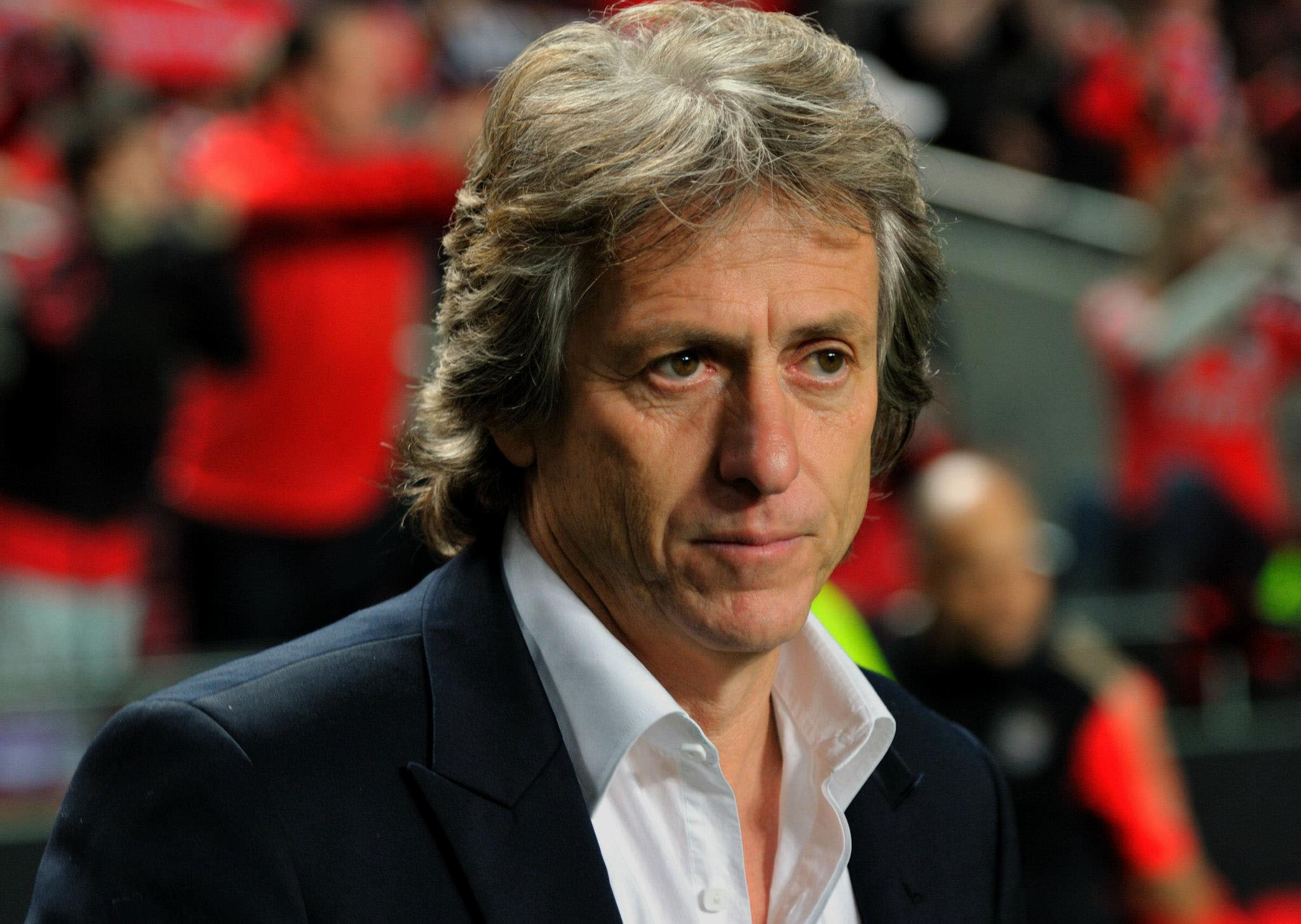
Jesus in 2011

==== 2009–2010: First season ====
On 17 June 2009, Jesus replaced Quique Flores at the helm of Benfica. In his first year, he led Benfica to the first division title after a five-year wait, with only two league defeats and 78 goals scored, also reaching the quarter-finals in the Europa League, losing to Liverpool on a 3–5 aggregate score (this would be the last match Benfica would lose in a run that lasted 27 games); he quickly implemented a 4–1–3–2 formation which resulted in highly attractive football.

On 5 October 2009, Jesus achieved his 100th victory in the Portuguese League, in a 3–1 home win against Paços de Ferreira. The following month he experienced his first Lisbon derby, which ended in a 0–0 away draw; at the end of the victorious campaign, which also brought the domestic League Cup, the coach was rewarded with a new contract extension, running until 2013.

==== 2010–2013: European improvement and domestic disappointment ====
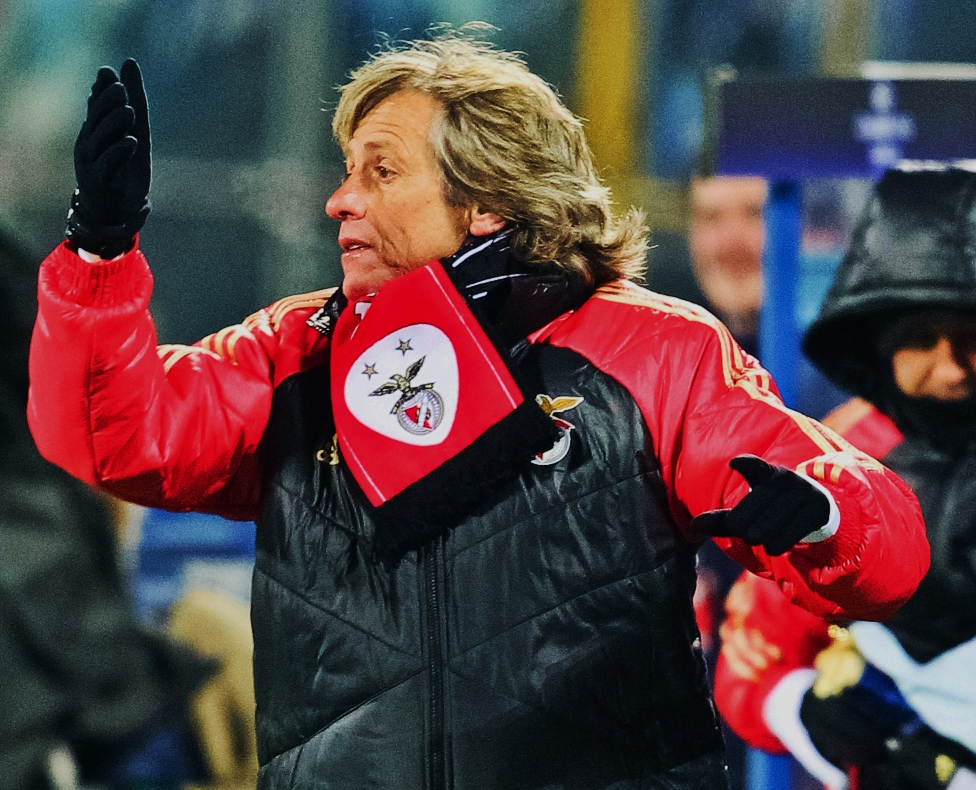
Jesus coaching Benfica in 2012

After a 2–0 win at VfB Stuttgart in that season's Europa League (4–1 on aggregate), Benfica's first ever victory in Germany, Jesus surpassed the record held by Jimmy Hagan's 1972–73 team, with 16 consecutive wins. During the league campaign, which started without departed Ángel Di María and Ramires, the lack of rotation caused a major fatigue in the most used players. At the end of the season, Benfica only won the League Cup despite setting a domestic record of 18 consecutive wins in all competitions.

In the 2011–12 season, Jesus guided Benfica to the second place in the league. He led the team to a club's fourth League Cup, and to the knockout rounds of the 2011–12 Champions League, defeating Zenit Saint Petersburg first, before losing to Chelsea in the quarter-finals.

On 10 December 2012, after a 3–1 away victory against Sporting, Jesus became the most successful Portuguese coach in the capital derby with seven wins in a total of nine, surpassing Toni (6/10). On 26 January of the following year he defeated former side Braga at the Estádio Municipal de Braga for the first time, after three defeats and one draw. He briefly led the league with a five-point advantage but did not maintain it, finishing in the second place again.

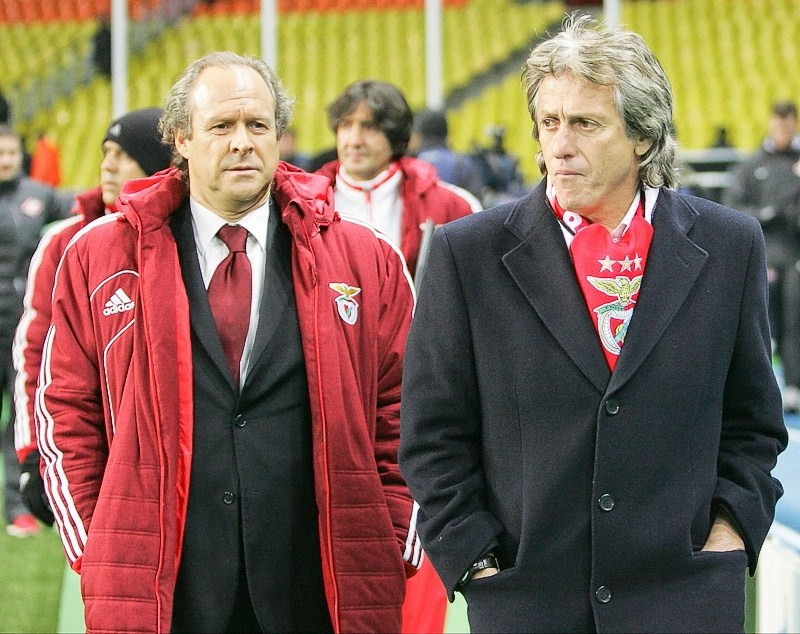
Director of football António Carraça (left) and Jesus (right) at a match at Spartak Moscow in October 2012

On 15 March 2013, in a match against Bordeaux in the campaign's Europa League, Jesus reached the 200 game-milestone with Benfica, becoming the sixth coach in the club's history to do so. During the season, he led the club to its first European final in 23 years: after coming third in its group in the UEFA Champions League, the side reached the final of the Europa League, losing 1–2 to Champions League winners Chelsea. Domestically, Benfica finished second in the league despite leading up to second to last day, and reached the final of the Portuguese Cup, their first since 2004–05, suffering an unexpected defeat at the hands of Guimarães; these losses added great pressure on the coach, as the club ended the season trophyless for the first time since 2007–08.

==== 2013–2015: Six pieces of silverware ====
On 4 June 2013, Jesus renewed his contract for a further two seasons. When police attempted to clear Benfica supporters from the pitch at the end of a match at Guimarães in September, he became physically involved, taking the side of supporters while obstructing the police. The Portuguese Football Federation gave him a 30-day suspension, which meant he would miss four league matches, and fined him €5,355. On 11 February 2014, Jesus won his tenth game (2–0) against Sporting, which draw two and won only one as an opposing coach. On 20 March, he surpassed John Mortimore's 1985–86 record of 918 minutes without conceding a goal at home matches.

Jesus led Benfica to its 33rd title on 20 April 2014, and became the second Portuguese coach to win two national championships for the club after Toni. Four days earlier the team had beat Porto 3–1 in spite of being reduced to ten men with 1 hour left to play, thus reaching the final of the Portuguese Cup for the second consecutive time. On 28 April 2014, Jesus managed to put Benfica in another final, that of the domestic League Cup, eliminating Porto at the Dragão on penalties in spite of being reduced to ten men with 1 hour left to play again. The trophy was won at Leiria on 7 May against Rio Ave, securing his fourth in the competition and the club's fifth. On 1 May 2014, Jesus helped the club progress to its second consecutive Europa League final, by defeating Juventus 2–1 on aggregate after a goalless draw in Turin. The Portuguese lost on penalties 13 days later in the same city to Sevilla and he stated that referee Felix Brych overlooked three penalty decisions for Benfica. On 18 May 2014, after seeing out Rio Ave in the Portuguese Cup final, Jesus became the first Portuguese coach and the seventh overall to win the double for Benfica (the tenth in the club's history). He also became the first coach in Portugal to conquer the domestic treble in one season (the club's first ever).

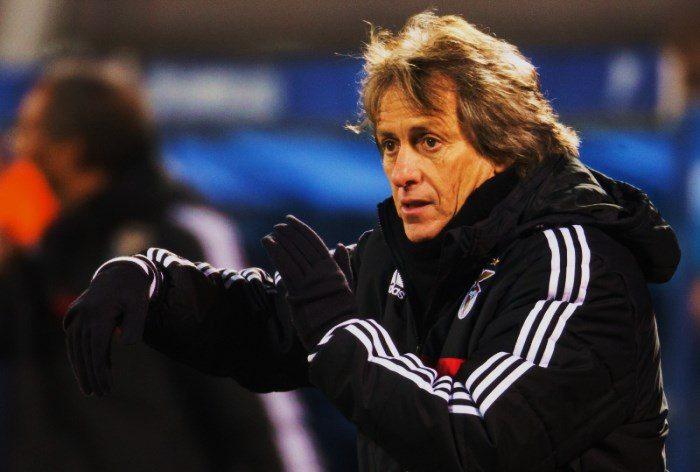
Jesus in a 2014–15 UEFA Champions League match at Zenit Saint Petersburg

On 10 August 2014, Jesus won his first Supertaça, as he surpassed János Biri as the coach with most matches at Benfica (273) and also tied with Cosme Damião in number of trophies won (8), surpassing both János Biri and Otto Glória. With that victory, he became the first coach to win Primeira Liga, Taça de Portugal, Supertaça Cândido de Oliveira and Taça da Liga (furthermore, in a year). He continued to break club records, becoming the coach with most victories (195) on 27 September 2014, in a win against Estoril. On 18 January 2015, Jesus reached the 300th game milestone at Benfica, with the highest winning percentage since Jimmy Hagan in the early 1970s, and on 26 April he surpassed Otto Glória as the coach with the most league matches at Benfica. On 17 May 2015, Jesus guided the club to its second consecutive league title, making it the first time Benfica won back-to-back league titles since 1984 (31 years), after Sven-Göran Eriksson, and became the first Portuguese coach to win two consecutive league titles at Benfica. On 29 May 2015, he won his fifth Taça da Liga (the club's sixth), and became the Benfica coach with most titles won (10) and the only to win 3 titles in two consecutive seasons. On 4 June 2015, Benfica announced they had concluded negotiations on a possible renewal of contract with Jesus, whose contract ended on 30 June.

=== Sporting CP ===
On 5 June 2015, Jesus signed a three-year contract with Benfica's Lisbon rivals Sporting CP, starting his functions on 1 July and earning €5 million per year. His first official match as Sporting coach was a Lisbon derby encounter with Benfica in the 2015 Supertaça, which Sporting won 1–0. Despite a positive start, he then failed to qualify for the UEFA Champions League and did not win any other trophy, finishing second in the Primeira Liga with 86 points (a club record), two points behind Benfica.

In May 2016, Jesus renewed his contract with Sporting and started earning €6 million a year until 2019. However, the 2016–17 season was trophyless.

In the following season, on 15 May 2018, Jesus, along with assistant coach Raul José and several players, was injured following an attack by around 50 supporters of Sporting at the club's training ground after the team finished third in the league and missed out on the UEFA Champions League qualification. Five days later, Sporting lost the Portuguese Cup final to Aves, making Jesus the first manager to have lost in the final with three clubs.

=== Al-Hilal ===
On 5 June 2018, Jesus left Portugal for the first time in his career and took charge of Saudi incumbent national champions Al Hilal. In his first game on 17 August, he won the Saudi Super Cup with a 2–1 victory over Al-Ittihad in London. Although he had a record of sixteen wins and only one defeat in twenty matches, he was sacked by the chairman on 26 January 2019 following contractual disagreements.

=== Flamengo ===
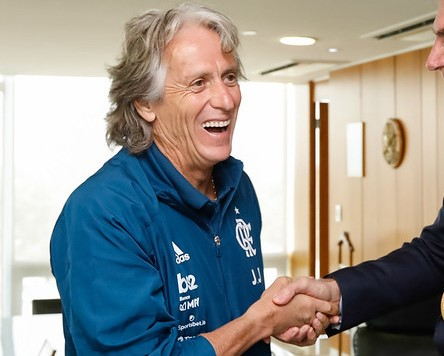
Jesus in 2020

On 1 June 2019, Jesus was appointed manager of Brazilian club Flamengo for a year. Upon signing, he was met with a negative reaction by fans, former Flamengo players and commentators, who believed that he was too old and could not adapt to Brazilian football; when the team beat opponents, their managers would credit the results to Flamengo's players and finances rather than to Jesus. He reacted to this atmosphere by saying "I did not come to take anybody's place or to teach anyone. I am neither better nor worse, I work according to a methodology. I would like to remind my Brazilian colleagues that we had a Brazilian [manager] in the national team, Scolari. He was admired by the Portuguese managers. He and many others who worked in Portugal...All of us in Portugal tried to learn from them, there was never this verbal aggression that there is against me. I don't understand these closed minds, even from some who are now at home, wearing gloves and shaking".

In his first game on 10 July, the team drew 1–1 at Athletico Paranaense in the first leg of the quarter-finals of the Copa do Brasil. Four days later in his first Campeonato Brasileiro Série A game, he beat Goiás 6–1 at the Maracanã Stadium.

Jesus' Flamengo won the 2019 Copa Libertadores, defeating Argentina's River Plate 2–1 with a late comeback in the final in Lima, Peru, on 23 November. He was the first foreign manager to win any international trophy with a Brazilian team, the fifth to win the Copa Libertadores with a foreign club, and the second European coach, as well as the second non-South American native, to accomplish the feat, after then-Yugoslav Mirko Jozić with Chile's Colo-Colo in 1991; he was also the fourth Portuguese to become club continental champion, following Artur Jorge, Manuel José, and José Mourinho. Within 24 hours of winning the continental title, Flamengo also won the national championship, when then second-placed Palmeiras lost 2–1 to Grêmio. He was the second foreign manager, and the first non-South American, to win the Brazilian championship after Argentine Carlos Volante in the debut edition in 1959, the first foreign manager to win it since the round-robin format was introduced, the first manager from his country to win a league title in South America, and the third Portuguese to win a national championship in the Americas, after Guilherme Farinha and Pedro Caixinha.

On 30 December 2019, President of Portugal Marcelo Rebelo de Sousa awarded to Jesus the Order of Prince Henry commander medal (ComIH). He said that Jesus' achievements aided Portugal's reputation abroad.

On 17 July 2020, Jesus left Flamengo. He won five trophies with the Brazilian club, winning 43 of the 57 games in charge of the Rubro-Negro.

=== Return to Benfica ===
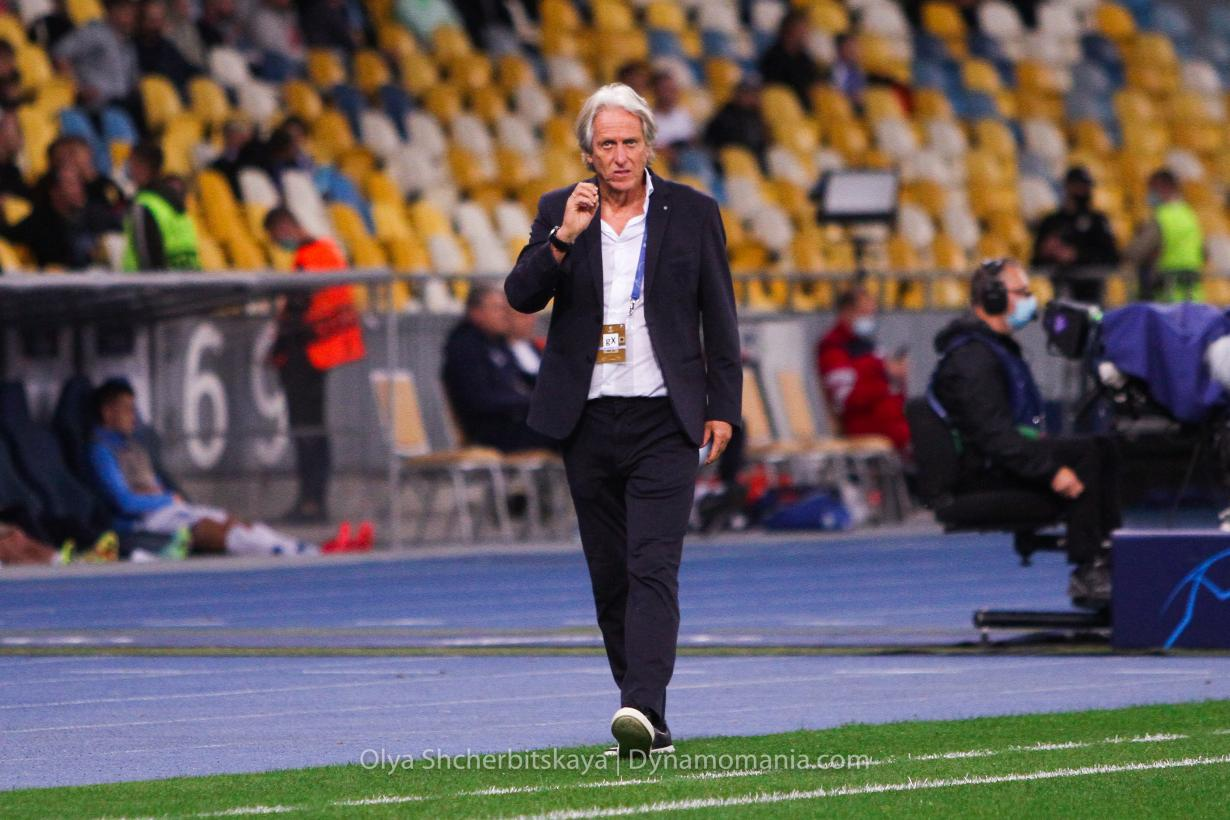
Jesus during his second stint with Benfica in 2021

Jesus returned to Benfica on 3 August 2020, signing a two-year contract with the club. Despite a €105 million investment, the biggest ever in Portuguese football, the season started with Benfica's elimination in the Champions League third qualifying round and continued with a loss at the Super Cup, an elimination from the League Cup, and a fourth place at the end of the league's first round. With his fourth loss at the Portuguese Cup final, Jesus equalled the record of José Maria Pedroto and Fernando Vaz.

After a rocky start to the 2021–22 campaign, which saw the 'águias' being beaten 1–0 by Portimonense and 3–1 by Sporting CP in the league – both at home - and suffer a 3–0 defeat at Porto's home ground in the Portuguese Cup round of 16, Jorge Jesus left Benfica by mutual consent on 28 December 2021, just two days shy of another trip to the Dragão. He was replaced by then Benfica B coach, Nélson Veríssimo.

=== Fenerbahçe ===
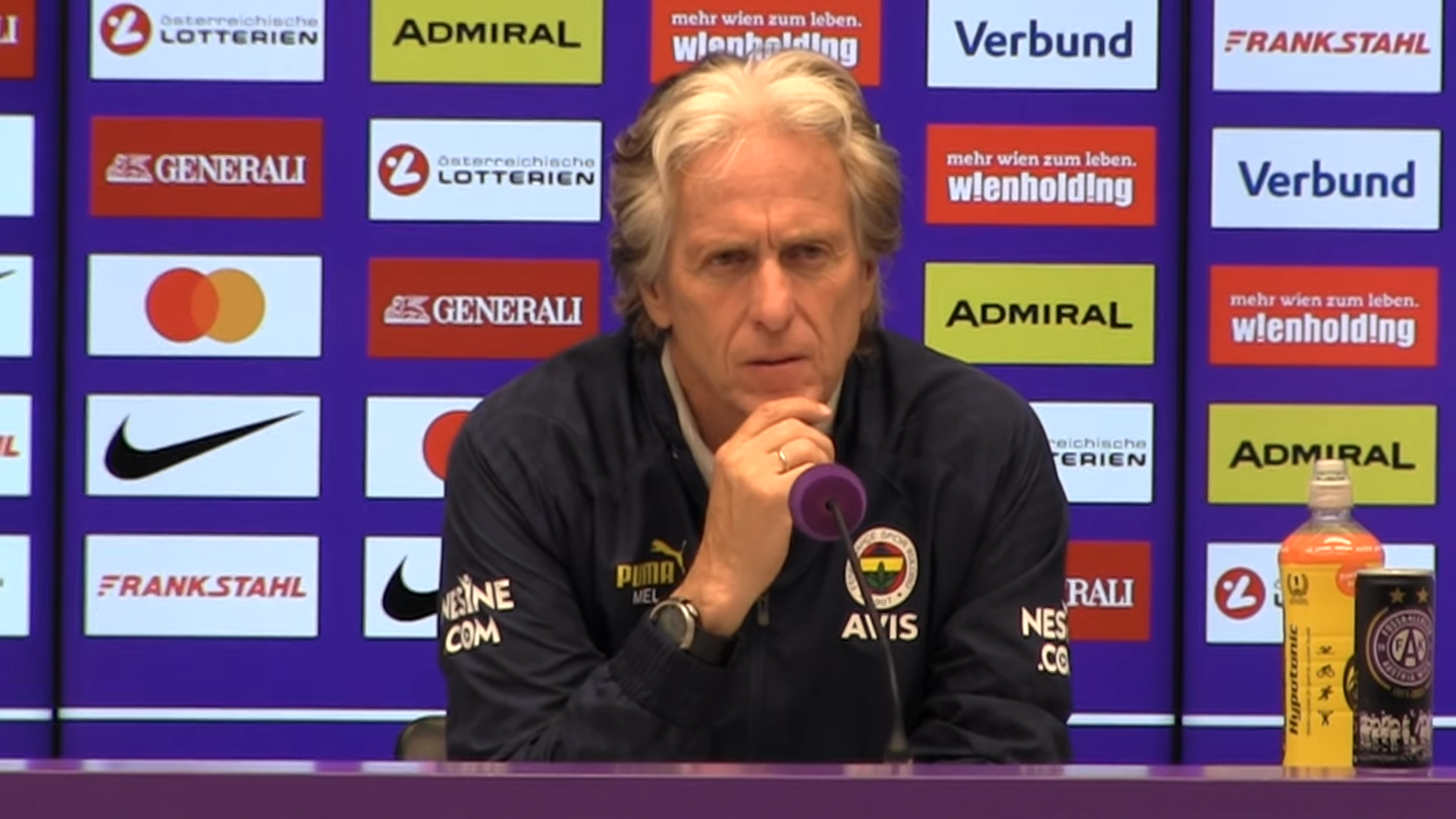
Jesus at a press conference with Fenerbahçe in 2022

Jesus arrived at Istanbul on 31 May 2022, and toured the stadium on 1 June 2022. On 2 June, Jesus was appointed as the manager of Fenerbahçe on a one-year deal.

Jesus won the 2022–23 Turkish Cup, defeating İstanbul Başakşehir with a score of 2–0 in the final on 11 June 2023, with Fenerbahçe winning their first trophy in 9 years back after the 2014 Turkish Super Cup. After the match, Jesus announced that he would leave the club.

=== Return to Al-Hilal ===
On 1 July 2023, Al-Hilal announced the reappointment of Jesus as their manager for the 2023–24 season. He was originally reported to be a candidate for the vacant coaching position of Saudi Arabia prior to the appointment.

On 26 February 2024, Al-Hilal won a record 14th consecutive Saudi Pro League match with a 2–0 victory against Al-Ettifaq, surpassing rival Al-Nassr's previous league record of 13 consecutive wins achieved from November 2013 to February 2014. On 5 April, following a 4–1 victory over Al-Khaleej, Al-Hilal set a new world record for consecutive matches won by a men's top-flight professional football club across all competitions with 32, breaking the record of 31 previously set by Irish club Belfast Celtic in 1948. Al-Hilal's streak would end at 34 consecutive wins, after losing 4–2 away to Al-Ain in the first leg of the Champions League semi-finals on 17 April. On 24 May, the Guinness World Records officials traveled to Al Hilal stadium to deliver the certificate that consecrates this record, with Jesus receiving it alongside Fahd Bin Nafel, the club's president. In his first full season with the club, Jesus led Al-Hilal to three trophies, the 2023 Saudi Super Cup, beating Al-Ittihad 4–1 in the final, the 2023–24 King Cup, beating Al-Nassr in the final following a penalty shoot-out, and the 2023–24 Saudi Pro League, surpassing the 100-goal mark for the season and finishing with a record 96 points, 14 points ahead of their closest rivals Al Nassr.

On 17 August 2024, Jesus won the 2024 Saudi Super Cup again, after defeating Al-Nassr with a score of 4–1 in the final. On 22 October, Jesus' Al Hilal defeated the current Asian champions Al Ain 5–4 in a match marked by the return of Neymar after being in the sidelines for more than a year due to injury. This was also Jesus' 81st victory with Al-Hilal, thus becoming the most successful coach in the club's history, achieving this tally in fewer than 100 matches (96 in total).

Jesus departed the club on 3 May 2025.

=== Al-Nassr ===
On 14 July 2025, Jesus became the head coach of fellow Saudi club Al-Nassr by signing a one-year contract. He said the reason he took the job was to help Cristiano Ronaldo win the Saudi Pro League. On 21 May 2026, he achieved just that, beating his former club Al-Hilal to the title on the final match day. Jesus said he considered it the most challenging project of his career, as Al-Hilal had created a "super team" with his help over the last years.

=== Portugal ===
On 10 July 2026, Jesus was appointed as head coach of the Portugal national team on a four-year deal. He was chosen to become the new manager to inject a relentless, club-style urgency and intense tactical discipline into a squad that underperformed relative to its immense talent pool at the 2026 World Cup. He made his debut in a match against Wales, in the group stage of the 2026–27 UEFA Nations League, winning 1–0 at Estádio José Alvalade in Portugal. With four consecutive wins in four matches, he secured qualification for the Nations League quarter-finals, becoming the first team to qualify and win all four of its opening matches in League A of the competition.

==== Conflict with Cristiano Ronaldo ====
During this period, he found himself embroiled in a public conflict with Cristiano Ronaldo after leaving him warming up without bringing him on during Portugal's 2–1 victory over Norway. Ronaldo was displeased that Jesus had not brought him onto the pitch and left the field without greeting the supporters at the end of the match. Two days later, on the eve of Portugal's match against Denmark, the two met in Malmö, Sweden, in the presence of Simão Coutinho, Al Nassr's sporting director. They reached an agreement to resolve the dispute, with Jesus agreeing to say at the following day's press conference what he had told Ronaldo during their meeting. The following morning, they met again, this time in the presence of Portuguese Football Federation president Pedro Proença, who had travelled to Malmö specifically to resolve the dispute, which Jesus continued to publicly deny. Later that afternoon, at a press conference ahead of the match in Copenhagen, Jorge Jesus addressed the matter involving Cristiano Ronaldo, once again denying that there was a conflict with the national team captain and reaffirming his authority as manager. Ronaldo was displeased with what he heard and, feeling betrayed by Jesus, left the Portugal training camp in Copenhagen before the match against Denmark. Despite the conflict, Jesus indicated that Ronaldo could return to the national team. Two days later, Ronaldo revealed the reasons behind his departure from the training camp, as he had promised on the day he left. He said he had felt betrayed by Jorge Jesus because the latter had failed to publicly repeat what he had told him during their meeting the previous day. He apologised for leaving the squad and stated that he remained available to represent Portugal. Ronaldo eventually announced his retirement from international football on 5 November 2026, on the eve of the announcement of the squad for the final two group-stage matches of the Nations League. Jesus responded that day, dressed entirely in black as a sign of mourning, describing Ronaldo as "a world reference, a reference for Portugal, a reference for the national team […] a symbol for Portuguese youth", and revealing that he had ordered a portrait of the player to be placed in the national team's auditorium. The following day, after announcing the squad, Jesus stated: "I wouldn't change anything. I made a manager's decision, with my team in mind. I am confident that I did nothing to cause this to happen", referring to the former captain's departure from the national team.

On 14 November, in the first match following Cristiano Ronaldo's departure, Portugal lost 4–1 to Denmark at the Estádio Municipal de Braga, in the penultimate round of the group stage of the 2026–27 UEFA Nations League, having already secured qualification. At the post-match press conference, a journalist asked Jorge Jesus whether he missed Cristiano Ronaldo, to which the manager replied: "Miss what?! Only if it were to keep me company. He doesn't play anymore, he's not here, he's already made his decision." It was Jorge Jesus's first defeat as manager of the Portugal national team, and the largest-ever defeat suffered by the national team at home in an official match.

Two days later, Dolores Aveiro, Cristiano Ronaldo's mother, expressed satisfaction with Portugal's defeat, as she believed her son had been deceived and disrespected by the national team. Jorge Jesus expressed his bewilderment at the situation: "Do I now have to answer Cristiano Ronaldo's mother? My mother too… And Cristiano Ronaldo's mother, as a mother, is a lady I hold in high regard. What is she supposed to say? A mother is a mother; there's no getting around that."

== Personal life ==
Jesus married his second wife, Ivone, and the couple had a son, Mauro. From his previous marriage, he had a daughter Tânia and a son Gonçalo. He is of Brazilian descent through his maternal grandmother, who was born in Recife.

He had over €1 million invested in the Banco Privado Português (BPP) when it went bankrupt in 2009. He recovered eighty percent of that amount in March 2014.

== Managerial statistics ==
As of match played 17 November 2026

Managerial record by team and tenure
| Team | Nat. | From | To | Record | | | | | | | | Ref. |
| Team | Nat. | From | To | G | W | D | L | GF | GA | GD | Win % | Ref. |
|---|---|---|---|---|---|---|---|---|---|---|---|---|
| Amora | (Portugal) | 1 July 1990 | 4 February 1993 | 103 | 41 | 34 | 28 | 132 | 92 | +40 | 39.81 | |
| Felgueiras | (Portugal) | 14 December 1993 | 12 May 1996 | 97 | 38 | 28 | 31 | 119 | 106 | +13 | 39.18 | |
| Felgueiras | (Portugal) | 18 February 1997 | 12 January 1998 | 34 | 17 | 6 | 11 | 41 | 32 | +9 | 50.00 | |
| União Madeira | (Portugal) | 10 February 1998 | 23 March 1998 | 6 | 1 | 1 | 4 | 5 | 13 | −8 | 16.67 | |
| Estrela da Amadora | (Portugal) | 6 June 1998 | 15 May 2000 | 75 | 23 | 30 | 22 | 83 | 84 | −1 | 30.67 | |
| Vitória Setúbal | (Portugal) | 3 October 2000 | 21 January 2002 | 51 | 23 | 10 | 18 | 84 | 64 | +20 | 45.10 | |
| Estrela da Amadora | (Portugal) | 30 January 2002 | 5 March 2003 | 41 | 21 | 9 | 11 | 51 | 41 | +10 | 51.22 | |
| Vitória Guimarães | (Portugal) | 8 December 2003 | 10 May 2004 | 22 | 7 | 6 | 9 | 17 | 22 | −5 | 31.82 | |
| Moreirense | (Portugal) | 4 April 2005 | 22 May 2005 | 7 | 2 | 3 | 2 | 9 | 7 | +2 | 28.57 | |
| União Leiria | (Portugal) | 26 September 2005 | 11 May 2006 | 30 | 13 | 6 | 11 | 43 | 35 | +8 | 43.33 | |
| Belenenses | (Portugal) | 12 May 2006 | 19 May 2008 | 70 | 31 | 16 | 23 | 87 | 74 | +13 | 44.29 | |
| Braga | (Portugal) | 20 May 2008 | 16 June 2009 | 48 | 24 | 13 | 11 | 68 | 30 | +38 | 50.00 | |
| Benfica | (Portugal) | 16 June 2009 | 4 June 2015 | 321 | 225 | 51 | 45 | 674 | 249 | +425 | 70.09 | |
| Sporting CP | (Portugal) | 5 June 2015 | 5 June 2018 | 158 | 99 | 26 | 33 | 302 | 146 | +156 | 62.66 | |
| Al-Hilal | (Saudi Arabia) | 5 June 2018 | 30 January 2019 | 25 | 20 | 4 | 1 | 65 | 21 | +44 | 80.00 | |
| Flamengo | (Brazil) | 1 June 2019 | 17 July 2020 | 59 | 45 | 10 | 4 | 129 | 47 | +82 | 76.27 | |
| Benfica | (Portugal) | 3 August 2020 | 28 December 2021 | 83 | 52 | 17 | 14 | 182 | 80 | +102 | 62.65 | |
| Fenerbahçe | (Turkey) | 2 June 2022 | 12 June 2023 | 56 | 38 | 10 | 8 | 126 | 58 | +68 | 67.86 | |
| Al-Hilal | (Saudi Arabia) | 1 July 2023 | 3 May 2025 | 105 | 81 | 14 | 10 | 282 | 95 | +187 | 77.14 | |
| Al-Nassr | (Saudi Arabia) | 14 July 2025 | 30 June 2026 | 47 | 39 | 3 | 5 | 129 | 35 | +94 | 82.98 | |
| Portugal | (Portugal) | 10 July 2026 | Present | 6 | 5 | 0 | 1 | 13 | 10 | +3 | 83.33 | |
| Career Total | | | | 1,444 | 845 | 297 | 302 | 2,641 | 1,341 | +1300 | 58.52 | |

== Honours ==
=== Managerial ===
Braga

- UEFA Intertoto Cup: 2008

Benfica

- Primeira Liga: 2009–10, 2013–14, 2014–15
- Taça de Portugal: 2013–14
- Taça da Liga: 2009–10, 2010–11, 2011–12, 2013–14, 2014–15
- Supertaça Cândido de Oliveira: 2014
- UEFA Europa League runner-up: 2012–13, 2013–14

Sporting CP

- Taça da Liga: 2017–18
- Supertaça Cândido de Oliveira: 2015

Al Hilal

- Saudi Pro League: 2023–24
- King's Cup: 2023–24
- Saudi Super Cup: 2018, 2023, 2024

Flamengo

- Campeonato Brasileiro Série A: 2019
- Copa Libertadores: 2019
- Supercopa do Brasil: 2020
- Recopa Sudamericana: 2020
- Campeonato Carioca: 2020

Fenerbahçe

- Turkish Cup: 2022–23

Al Nassr

- Saudi Pro League: 2025–26
- AFC Champions League 2 runner-up: 2025-26

=== Individual ===
- Primeira Liga Best Coach: 2009–10, 2013–14, 2014–15
- Primeira Liga Manager of the Month: September/October 2020, March 2021, September 2021
- Saudi Pro League Manager of the Season: 2023–24, 2025–26
- Saudi Pro League Manager of the Month: September 2018, October 2023, November 2023, December 2023, February 2024, March 2024, May 2024, September 2024, September 2025
- Cosme Damião Awards – Coach of the Year: 2014
- Globos de Ouro Best Portuguese Manager: 2015, 2016
- Bola de Prata Best Coach: 2019
- Prêmio Craque do Brasileirão Best Coach: 2019

=== Orders ===
- Knight Commander of the Order of Prince Henry (30 December 2019)

== See also ==
- List of football managers with the most matches
