= 2008–09 S.L. Benfica season =

Benfica
2008–09 season
- President: Luís Filipe Vieira
- Manager: Quique Sánchez Flores
- Stadium: Estádio da Luz
- Primeira Liga: 3rd
- Taça de Portugal: Fifth round
- Taça da Liga: Winners
- UEFA Cup: Group stage (5th)
- Top goalscorer: League: Óscar Cardozo (17); All: Óscar Cardozo (17)
- Highest home attendance: 60,022 v Sporting CP (27 September 2008)
- Lowest home attendance: 9,570 v Metalist Kharkiv (18 December 2008)
- Average home league attendance: 35,698
- Biggest win: Marítimo 0–6 Benfica (7 December 2008)
- Biggest defeat: Olympiacos 5–1 Benfica (27 November 2008)
Home colours	Away colours

The 2008–09 European football season was Sport Lisboa e Benfica's 105th season and their 75th consecutive season in the top flight of Portuguese football. The season ran from 1 July 2008 to 30 June 2009, with Benfica competing domestically in the Primeira Liga, Taça de Portugal and Taça da Liga. The club also participated in the UEFA Cup, since they finished fourth in the Primeira Liga the previous season.

After José Antonio Camacho's March 2008 resignation, Benfica did not have a permanent manager. The club inquired about Quique Sánchez Flores, Sven-Göran Eriksson and others, ultimately choosing Flores. Rui Costa led the transfer activity as Benfica continued to invest heavily, spending nearly €19 million on Javier Balboa, Carlos Martins, Pablo Aimar and Sidnei and bringing in José Antonio Reyes and David Suazo on loan. Major departures included Rui Costa, Cristian Rodríguez, Petit and Nélson.

Benfica's season began inauspiciously, but they quickly recovered, gaining momentum domestically and eliminating Napoli to qualify for the group stage of the UEFA Cup. Until January, the club's performance fluctuated in their European campaign and the domestic league. Although they finished last in the former, they reached first place in the Primeira Liga for the first time since 2005.

In the new year, Benfica suffered their first league loss, falling to second place and beginning their erratic spell. Despite a sterling League Cup (where they earned their first honour in four seasons), the club's league play was not as impressive. They battled Porto for first place until March, when they had another costly loss and were passed by Sporting CP. Benfica tried to retake second place in the remaining eight matches, but in early May, the club dropped five points, sealing their fate; they finished third, missing the UEFA Champions League for a second consecutive season.

== Season summary ==
=== Pre-season ===
In February 2008, club president Luís Filipe Vieira announced that a new director of football for 2008–09 had been selected. Although he did not name the individual, one month later Rui Costa confirmed that he would oversee Benfica's football division. With the unexpected resignation of head coach José Antonio Camacho on 10 March, assistant Fernando Chalana led the team through the final two months of the season. On 12 April Spanish manager Quique Sánchez Flores confirmed contacts from Benfica, who wanted him to take over the team immediately. Sánchez Flores declined the offer because he did not wish to be a temporary manager, and preferred to join a team at the beginning of the season.

On 7 May, Vieira and Rui Costa travelled to Manchester to persuade Sven-Göran Eriksson to return for a third stint with Benfica. Although both sides confirmed the meeting, after more than a week without an agreement the club moved on to other coaching candidates. Benfica then contacted Getafe manager Michael Laudrup and Brazilian manager Zico. After failing to come to terms with either, the club turned to first choice Sánchez Flores and signed him on 24 May. Sánchez Flores would be aided by technical assistant Fran Escribá, goalkeeper coach Emilio Álvarez and fitness coach Pako Ayestarán, with Diamantino Miranda and Chalana links to club management.

Benfica made their first transfer deals in late April, adding Ruben Amorim and Jorge Ribeiro, both of whom had previously played for Benfica. With Sánchez Flores in charge, Benfica added midfielder Hassan Yebda on a free transfer and spent €4 million on Javier Balboa from Real Madrid. Balboa was signed only three days after the shock transfer of former Paris Saint-Germain loan Cristian Rodríguez to rival Porto. Although Benfica negotiated with PSG and the Uruguayan for months, the sides could not reach an agreement. During the next few weeks Benfica continued to spend, paying €3 million to Recreativo de Huelva for Carlos Martins and €6.5 million two weeks later, after a prolonged transfer saga, to Real Zaragoza for Pablo Aimar.

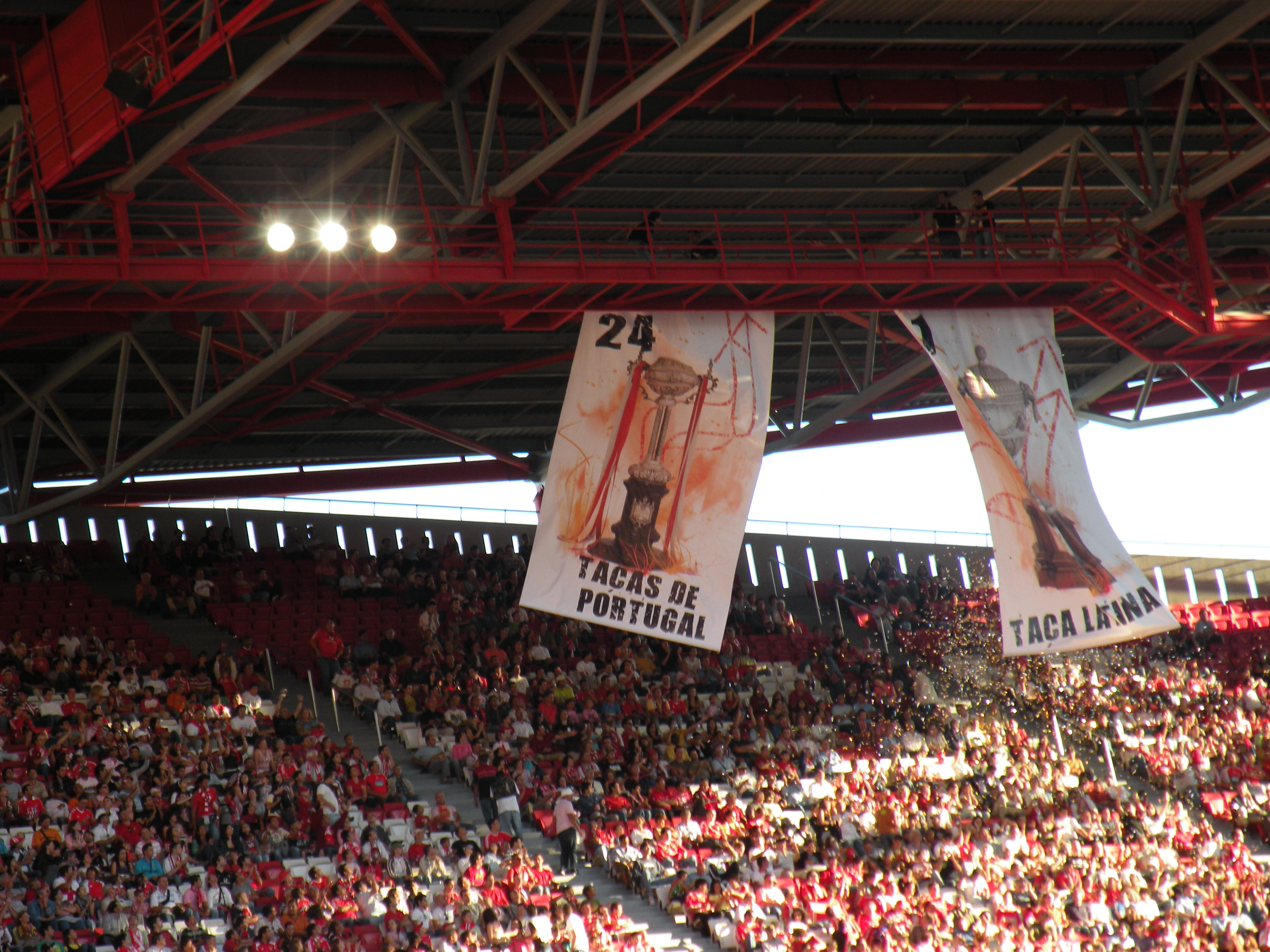
Banners commemorating Benfica's 24 Portuguese Cups and one Latin Cup at the Eusébio Cup on 15 August

The club's pre-season began on 8 July with two days of medical tests. Benfica's first training session was held two days later, nine days before their first pre-season match with Estoril. After a draw with Estori, the club lost Guadiana Trophy matches to Blackburn Rovers and Sporting CP. That week Benfica made more squad adjustments, paying €5 million for 18-year old Sidnei and releasing Petit after six years with the club. Early in August, Benfica won the Cidade de Guimarães Trophy against Paris Saint-Germain and Vitória de Guimarães, drawing with the former and defeating the latter. Before their presentation match with Feyenoord, Benfica signed Spanish winger José Antonio Reyes in a €2.6 million loan deal. In the match with Feyenoord, Óscar Cardozo scored the winning goal for Benfica. The club ended its preparation for the season against Inter Milan on 15 August in the new Eusébio Cup. After a goalless draw in regular time, the Milanese won on penalties.

=== August–September ===
Benfica's first competitive game was an away Primeira Liga opener against Rio Ave. Sánchez Flores did not have Reyes, and Jonathan Urretaviscaya started instead. At the Estádio dos Arcos, the home team scored first with a 55th-minute goal from José Semedo. A minute later Benfica evened the score, with Urreta assisting Nuno Gomes for the 1–1 final result. It was the fourth consecutive time that Benfica failed to win their league start. Sánchez Flores said that Rio Ave created unexpected problems: "It was not a easy game. We had a quality opponent, who left us trailing when we were not expecting it." During the last week of August Benfica brought in Honduran striker David Suazo on loan, sold right-back Nélson Marcos to Betis and was paired with Italian side Napoli in the UEFA Cup first-round draw on 29 August. A day later, Benfica hosted Porto for the first Clássico of the season. The visitors started better, converting a 10th-minute penalty kick for a Kostas Katsouranis foul against Lucho González. In the 56th minute, Cardozo exploited a mistake by Helton to head in the equaliser. Three minutes later Katsouranis was sent off, but Benfica held the tie until the final whistle. Quique Flores said, "It was a good game. In normal conditions we would have done better, but circumstances made it a little harder."

After the first two weeks of September were dedicated to international football, Benfica returned to competition on the 18th. In the first leg of the qualifying stage for the UEFA Cup, the club faced Napoli at the Stadio San Paolo. Suazo began the scoring for Benfica with a 16th-minute header, but the lead lasted only two minutes. Luigi Vitale tied the score, and Germán Denis scored again for Napoli a minute later. In the second half Christian Maggio added another for Napoli, with Luisão scoring for Benfica three minutes later. Although Quique Flores believed that the loss was a combination of referee mistakes and errors by his players, he believed his club could qualify. The following Monday, Benfica visited the Estádio da Mata Real to play Paços de Ferreira in a 4–3 win. Nuno Gomes scored the one-nil in the sixth minute, and Paços equalised less than 10 minutes later. Before half-time, Quique's men added two more goals. In the restart, Paços made the match 3–2 in the 63rd minute before Benfica responded with a fourth goal from Jorge Ribeiro. Before the final whistle, William scored another for Paços. Sánchez Flores said about his first win at Benfica, "I am happy for the fans, who needed this to feel that their team also fights for the league." On 27 September, Benfica hosted Sporting CP for the first Lisbon derby of the season. With the visitors enjoying a four-point lead in the league, Benfica had to win to move up in the standings. The game's only goals were in the second half, the first in the 67th minute when Pablo Aimar assisted Reyes; four minutes later, Sidnei headed in a free kick from Carlos Martins for the second. Sánchez Flores was encouraged by the victory against a team as strong as Sporting.

=== October–November ===
October began with a crucial match against Napoli. Benfica had only defeated Italian teams four times, most recently on 29 March 1994. The club won with two second-half goals (an opener from Reyes and a confirmation goal from Nuno Gomes), qualifying for the group stage. The victory placed Sánchez Flores in club history, since Benfica had never eliminated an Italian team after losing the first leg. The game was Benfica TV's first broadcast. On 6 October, the club played Leixões on the road. With the top of the Primeira Liga just three points away, Benfica could not beat the home team, losing two points; they led the game for over an hour, but were stopped by an 88th-minute equaliser from Wesley. To Sánchez Flores, the draw was due to Benfica's performance: low possession, missed passes and fouls resulting in free kicks. The following day, Benfica heard from UEFA headquarters in Nyon that their UEFA Cup group would include Olympiacos, Galatasaray, Hertha BSC and Metalist Kharkiv. After a two-week break for international matches, competition resumed with the Taça de Portugal on the 18th. Benfica met third-tier side Penafiel at home; unable to defeat them in regular and extra time, they required penalty kicks. Luís Dias missed one for Penafiel, enabling Benfica to advance to the fifth round. Sánchez Flores said, "We wanted to play good football, but that did not happen." The following Thursday, Benfica travelled to Berlin to play Hertha in the Group B opening game. They took the lead with a 51st-minute goal from Ángel Di María, but Hertha responded with a 74th-minute equaliser when a shot by Marko Pantelić was deflected by Maxi Pereira. Captain Nuno Gomes said that although an away draw in Europe was a good result, Hertha's equaliser was bitter for the team. October ended with a home game against Naval. After a first half in which both teams failed to convert opportunities, Benfica scored their opening goal in the 71st minute. Naval evened the score eleven minutes later, but Cardozo responded with an 86th-minute winner for Benfica. Sánchez Flores said that the game was difficult because of his club's inconsistency.

In November, Benfica had a busy schedule with six matches, two for the UEFA Cup. They began with a visit to Estádio D. Afonso Henriques, home of Vitória de Guimarães. David Suazo's 14th-minute goal was Benfica's 5,000th goal in competition. Sidnei made the score 2–0, with Guimarães scoring a goal. The win gave Benfica second place, one point shy of leader Leixões. Sánchez Flores attributed the victory to his players' commitment. The following Thursday, Benfica hosted Galatasaray in match-day two of the UEFA Cup. They lost two-nil, with second-half goals from Emre Aşık and Ümit Karan. It was the club's first European loss to a Turkish team, and their largest home loss in European competition since 6 March 1997. With one point in two games, Benfica had to earn points in their next match to remain in the competition. On 10 November, the club romped over Desportivo das Aves in the Portuguese Cup. The Liga de Honra side was helpless against Benfica's offence, trailing three-nil at the 30-minute mark. Almost a week later, Benfica hosted a league game against Estrela da Amadora. After a first half in which they struggled to beat Estrela goalkeeper Nélson, in the 51st minute Nuno Gomes assisted Sidnei for the game's only goal. Sánchez Flores called the win important because it held Benfica's lead over their rivals. The club continued to win domestically, with an away victory over Académica on the 23rd. Earning 21 points in nine match days was a club high for the 2000s, matched only in 2000–01. Four days later, Benfica visited Karaiskakis Stadium to play Olympiacos. With a 39th-second goal from Luciano Galletti, the club trailed from the beginning. They conceded three more goals in the first half and a fifth in the second half, losing 5–1. The result left Benfica on the brink of a UEFA Cup exit, and was a dark remembrance of their worst European defeat nine years before in Vigo. Their performance was criticised; according to Luís Avelãs it was "extremely poor, full of beginner's mistakes, inadmissible distractions and multiple poor choices", and Sánchez Flores apologised to the fans.

=== December–January ===
Benfica began December hoping to extend their domestic winning streak, and the club's first game hosted Vitória de Setúbal on 1 December. Laionel opened the score for Setúbal in the 35th minute, with Benfica only responding in the second half with Kostas Katsouranis. In the 59th minute, David Suazo fired a powerful shot that beat Pedro Alves and put Benfica in the lead. However, in the 91st minute, a bicycle kick by Anderson do Ó cleared Quim and levelled the game. Although Sánchez Flores called the equaliser an accident, he soon dropped Quim in favour of José Moreira. A week later, Benfica visited the Estádio dos Barreiros to play Marítimo. They had their best performance of the season, winning 6–0 with Suazo and Nuno Gomes each scoring twice. The win put Benfica at the top of the table for the first time since May 2005, and was their largest away win since 1974. On 13 December, Benfica played Leixões for a place in the Portuguese Cup quarter-finals. On a rainy night at Estádio do Mar, neither team could find the back of the net in regular and extra time. Reyes missed a penalty, giving Leixões the win. Although Nuno Gomes was frustrated with the elimination, he said it was time to hold their heads high and win the league. On Thursday the 18th, Benfica closed their European campaign by hosting Metalist Kharkiv. To qualify, Benfica had to win 8–0 and Olympiacos not win; in case of a draw, Benfica needed a better goal average. They lost one-nil, finishing last in Group B. Sánchez Flores assumed full responsibility for his team's performance in the competition. Of 40 teams, only Partizan, Heerenveen and Feyenoord played worse than Benfica. The year ended with a home game against Nacional. Benfica never overcame Nacional goalkeeper Rafael Bracalli, wasting an opportunity to open a four-point lead in the league table. The match ended in controversy after Cardozo had a goal disallowed because Miguel Vítor had deflected the ball with his hands. According to Sánchez Flores, the goal was legitimate and Benfica were deprived of three points.

In January, the club had seven scheduled matches, four in the Primeira Liga and three for the League Cup. They opened with an away game against Trofense, their first league loss. Reguila scored first for Trofense, with Hélder Barbosa adding a confirmation goal in the 82nd minute. The loss cost Benfica first place, and they trailed Porto by one point. Quique Flores said, "We played very poorly, weak in all aspects, especially offensively". Benfica rebounded with an away win in Guimarães in the first match day of the Taça da Liga. Katsouranis headed in the first goal in the ninth minute, and Carlos Martins added a second goal in the 82nd minute. On 11 January, Benfica defeated Braga at the Estádio da Luz. At half-time, David Luiz headed in a controversial winner, and Sánchez Flores said that the club were on course to regain their confidence after a poor past few weeks. They won their third match in a row on 14 January, defeating Olhanense 4–1 for the League Cup. Dí Maria scored the final goal in an individual effort dedicated to Diego Maradona, who was present. On 17 January, Benfica confirmed a place in the semi-finals of the League Cup with a one-nil win against Belenenses. The goal was scored by Katsouranis, assisted by Di María. The following Friday, Benfica faced Beleneses for the second time in a week. They had less success, losing two points in a goalless draw. Sánchez Flores said that Benfica could have won, and the draw was a poor result. The club ended the month with a home win against Rio Ave. Mantorras scored the only goal in the 70th minute, three minutes after entering the game. Now a squad player after several injury-plagued seasons, he was regarded as a super-sub; 12 of his 28 Benfica goals came from the bench.

=== February–March ===
In February, Benfica's schedule included two difficult away matches against Porto and Sporting. They began the month with the semi-final of the 2008–09 Taça da Liga against Vitória de Guimarães. Benfica scored the opening goal on a Carlos Martins corner kick which Grégory headed into his own net. Near the end of regulation time, Pablo Aimar added the second (his first for the club), and Guimarães responded with a consolation goal. Four days later, Benfica played Porto at the Estádio do Dragão in a game between the top two teams on the league table. They scored first through Hassan Yebda, who headed in a corner kick from José Antonio Reyes. In the second half, Benfica held Porto until the 72nd minute, when Pedro Proença signalled a controversial penalty by Yebda on Lisandro López. Lucho González converted it for a 1–1 draw. Sánchez Flores was satisfied, because the club played well and controlled the game. The result kept Porto on top of the league table by one point. On 15 February, Benfica hosted Paços de Ferreira. The scoring came in the second half – the first goal in the 69th minute, when Aimar assisted Óscar Cardozo. Four minutes later, Ruben Amorim made it 2–0, with Paços reacting immediately with the 2–1 from Ferreira. Near the end, Di María scored the third goal for Benfica, with Paços cutting their lead to 3–2 and then hitting the post. Sánchez Flores called it a hard-fought win, with his players' commitment keeping Porto at bay. Almost a week later, Benfica visited the Estádio José Alvalade to face Sporting. An 11th-minute opener from Liédson was answered with an equaliser from Reyes before half-time. In the second half, Derlei unlocked the draw, scoring Sporting's second goal before Liédson scored a third; Cardozo brought it down to 3–2, and the clock ran out three minutes later. Benfica's second league loss had troubling consequences; Sporting was tied for second place with 37 points, and Porto had a four-point lead. The club finished February with a home win against Leixões. Élvis opened with an own goal for Benfica. Nuno Gomes later scored the second (his fifth goal of the season), with Leixões replying with a goal of their own. Despite playing with ten men, Benfica held Leixões back and won. To Sánchez Flores, the match was intense and difficult, but the victory put pressure on their opponents (who faced each other in following day). With a goalless draw in the game between Porto and Sporting, Benfica finished February with 40 points, two fewer than Porto.

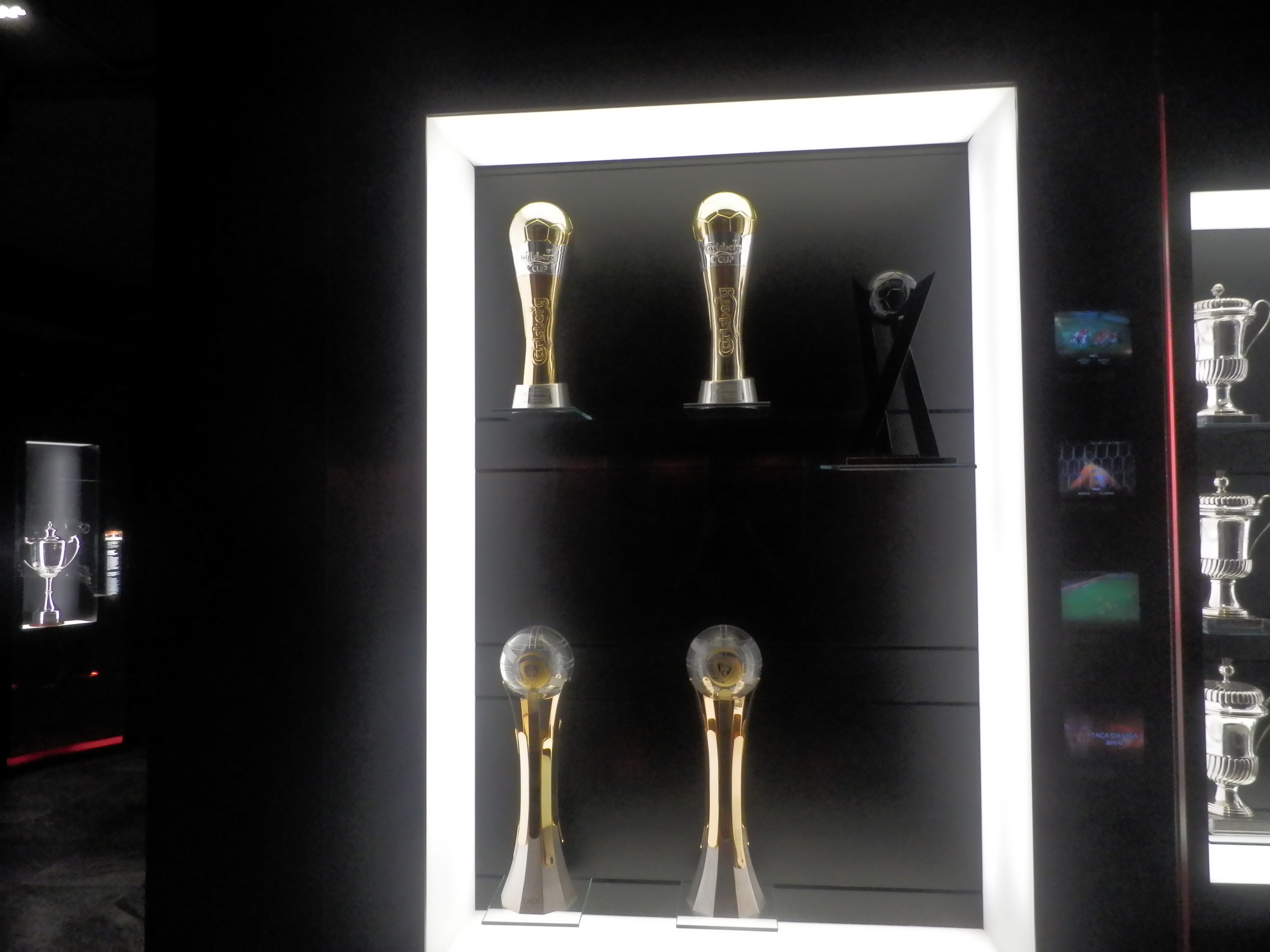
The 2009 Taça da Liga (top left) was Benfica's first trophy since August 2005.

March was less busy than February, with only three matches. Benfica's first was at the Municipal José Bento Pessoa against Naval. The club took the lead with a third-minute goal from Aimar. Naval evened the score at the start of the second half with a goal by Marcelinho, but Katsouranis scored Benfica's second goal. Miguel Vítor, who assisted the goal, told the media that Benfica wanted to keep winning in case Porto slipped. On 14 March, the club hosted Vitória de Guimarães in their third game of 2009. Benfica was caught off-guard, losing 1–0 on a 66th-minute goal from Roberto. Sánchez Flores called the defeat an "accident that sometimes happens", and said his team was focused on the remaining eight games. The loss impacted the league standings; Benfica dropped to third place, and Porto had a five-point lead over Sporting. A week later, Benfica and Sporting played the 2009 Taça da Liga final at the Estádio do Algarve. After a goalless first half, Sporting scored the opening goal through Bruno Pereirinha in the 48th minute. Reyes levelled the score for Benfica in the 75th minute, converting a penalty kick. The game was decided on penalties, and the club won their first League Cup. With his first trophy at Benfica, Sánchez Flores called the win fair and the club had their sights on recovering second place and winning the league championship.

=== April–May ===
Club competition paused in the last week of March, resuming over the first weekend of April. Benfica's first game was a visit to nearby Estádio da Reboleira to meet Estrela da Amadora. Referee Hugo Miguel called three penalties in the first half-hour: two for Benfica and one for Estrela. Cardozo converted both (in the fifth and 16th minutes), and Silvestre Varela scored for Estrela in a 2–1 final result. Sánchez Flores said that although Benfica played poorly, winning was what mattered. On 11 April, Benfica hosted Académica in another home loss; a 23rd-minute goal by William Tiero secured Académica's second consecutive away win against Benfica. The loss ended any hope of winning the title, since Porto had an eight-point lead. The race for second place (and a UEFA Champions League spot) also experienced a setback, since Sporting now had a four-point lead. The fans turned on Sánchez Flores, waving white handkerchiefs in the traditional request for resignation. The Spaniard realised that winning the Primeira Liga was nearly impossible, and Benfica should focus on qualifying for the Champions League. The club rebounded with an away win against Vitória de Setúbal. They started strong, scoring three goals in the first half for a final score of 4–0. Cardozo and Nuno Gomes scored two goals apiece. A week after Setúbal, Benfica hosted Marítimo for April's final match. By the 38th minute, the club was winning 3–0. Marítimo reacted, cutting Benfica's lead to 3–2 in the 60th minute, but the club defended their lead. Although Sánchez Flores was happy with the three points, he said that Benfica should have better controlled the game.

In May, Benfica had four matches to gain four points on Sporting. The first was at the Estádio da Madeira with Nacional. Knowing that Sporting had lost points to Académica, Benfica hoped to narrow the gsp between them to two points. After an uneventful first half, in the 56th minute Nenê scored the opening goal for Nacional. Eight minutes later, Rúben Micael extended the lead, with Reyes reducing it in the 67th minute. Benfica pressed unsuccessfully for the equaliser before Nacional scored again with Miguel Fidalgo. Sánchez Flores realised that winning the league title was now impossible. On 9 May, Benfica met Trofense at home. Valdomiro scored first for the visitors in the 31st minute before Benfica scored twice in two minutes, reaching half-time with a 2–1 lead. In the second half, Paulinho tied the score for Trofense. Sporting won that day, so Benfica trailed by seven points with two match days left and could not qualify for the Champions League. Sánchez Flores said, "I know when to arrive and when to leave. I do not want to be a problem for the club." Playing out the schedule, Benfica first visited the Municipal de Braga. They won 3–1, ending a five-year winless streak there. The victory was against Jorge Jesus, widely reported as Sánchez Flores' successor. A week later, Benfica ended their campaign with a 3–1 win against Belenenses. Sánchez Flores analysed the club's season: "They asked me to improve the team and I did. But we all know what happened last year; we should set realistic goals. Second place was possible, but we failed in the final third. I won a title and fought for another." A short time later, he and the club terminated his contract.

== Competitions ==
Win Draw Loss Postponed

=== Overall record ===
Competition	First match	Last match	Record								
Competition	First match	Last match	G	W	D	L	GF	GA	GD	Win %	Source
Primeira Liga	24 August 2008	23 May 2009	30	17	8	5	54	32	+22	56.67	
Taça de Portugal	19 October 2008	13 December 2008	3	1	2	0	3	0	+3	33.33	
Taça da Liga	7 January 2008	21 March 2009	5	4	1	0	10	3	+7	80.00	
UEFA Cup	18 September 2008	18 December 2008	6	1	1	4	6	12	−6	16.67	
Total			44	23	12	9	73	47	+26	52.27	

=== Primeira Liga ===
==== League table ====
Pos	Team	Pld	W	D	L	GF	GA	GD	Pts	Qualification or relegation
1	Porto (C)	30	21	7	2	61	18	+43	70	Qualification to Champions League group stage
2	Sporting CP	30	20	6	4	45	20	+25	66	Qualification to Champions League third qualifying round
3	Benfica	30	17	8	5	54	32	+22	59	Qualification to Europa League play-off round
4	Nacional	30	15	7	8	47	32	+15	52	Qualification to Europa League play-off round
5	Braga	30	13	11	6	38	21	+17	50	Qualification to Europa League third qualifying round

Source: lpfp.pt (in Portuguese)
Rules for classification: 1) Points; 2) Head-to-head points; 3) Head-to-head goal difference; 4) Head-to-head away goals scored; 5) Goal difference; 6) Matches won; 7) Goals scored
(C) Champions

==== Results by round ====
Round	1	2	3	4	5	6	7	8	9	10	11	12	13	14	15	16	17	18	19	20	21	22	23	24	25	26	27	28	29	30
Ground	A	H	A	H	A	H	A	H	A	H	A	H	A	H	A	H	A	H	A	H	A	H	A	H	A	H	A	H	A	H
Result	D	D	W	W	D	W	W	W	W	D	W	D	L	W	D	W	D	W	L	W	W	L	W	L	W	W	L	D	W	W
Position	6	10	7	5	4	3	2	2	2	2	1	1	2	1	2	2	2	2	2	2	2	3	3	3	3	3	3	3	3	3

Source: ForaDeJogo.net
A = Away; H = Home; W = Win; D = Draw; L = Loss

==== Matches ====
24 August 2008 1	Rio Ave	1–1	Benfica	Vila do Conde
21:15	Semedo 55'	Report	Nuno Gomes 56'	Stadium: Estádio do Rio Ave FC; Attendance: 10,426; Referee: Carlos Xistra

30 August 2008 2	Benfica	1–1	Porto	Lisbon
20:45	Cardozo 56'; Katsouranis (yellow card) 11' (yellow-red card) 59'	Report	L. González 10' (pen.)	Stadium: Estádio da Luz; Attendance: 53,496; Referee: Jorge Sousa

22 September 2008 3	Paços de Ferreira	3–4	Benfica	Paços de Ferreira
21:00	Ozéia 13'; Rui Miguel 63'; William 85'	Report	Nuno Gomes 6'; Pereira 31'; Cardozo 43' (pen.); Ribeiro 76'	Stadium: Estádio da Mata Real; Attendance: 3,784; Referee: Bruno Paixão

27 September 2008 4	Benfica	2–0	Sporting CP	Lisbon
20:45	Reyes 67'; Sidnei 71'	Report		Stadium: Estádio da Luz; Attendance: 60,062; Referee: Duarte Gomes

6 October 2008 5	Leixões	1–1	Benfica	Leixões
21:00	Wesley 88'	Report	Cardozo 32'	Stadium: Estádio do Mar; Attendance: 8,500; Referee: Olegário Benquerença

26 October 2008 6	Benfica	2–1	Naval	Lisbon
20:00	Luisão 71'; Cardozo 86'	Report	Marcelinho 82'	Stadium: Estádio da Luz; Attendance: 45,714; Referee: Rui Costa

2 November 2008 7	Vitória de Guimarães	1–2	Benfica	Guimarães
20:45	Douglas 40'	Report	Suazo 14'; Sidnei 19'; Reyes (yellow card) 42' (yellow-red card) 45'	Stadium: Estádio D. Afonso Henriques; Attendance: 26,812; Referee: Carlos Xistra

16 November 2008 8	Benfica	1–0	Estrela da Amadora	Lisbon
19:30	Sidnei 50'	Report		Stadium: Estádio da Luz; Attendance: 36,529; Referee: João Capela

23 November 2008 9	Académica	0–2	Benfica	Coimbra
20:15		Report	Amorim 31'; Cardozo 48'	Stadium: Estádio Cidade de Coimbra; Attendance: 18,980; Referee: Pedro Proença

1 December 2008 10	Benfica	2–2	Vitória de Setúbal	Lisbon
20:30	Katsouranis 47'; Suazo 59'	Report	Laionel 35'; Anderson do Ó 90'; Sandro (yellow card) 75' (yellow-red card) 90'	Stadium: Estádio da Luz; Attendance: 25,921; Referee: Vasco Santos

7 December 2008 11	Marítimo	0–6	Benfica	Funchal
19:15	Marcos (red card) 17'	Report	Reyes 20' (pen.); Suazo 42', 85'; Luisão 66'; Nuno Gomes 86', 90'	Stadium: Estádio dos Barreiros; Attendance: 8,127; Referee: Artur Soares Dias

22 December 2008 12	Benfica	0–0	Nacional	Lisbon
19:45		Report	Alonso	Stadium: Estádio da Luz; Attendance: 36,399; Referee: Pedro Henriques

4 January 2009 13	Trofense	2–0	Benfica	Trofa, Portugal
20:30	Reguila 45'; Barbosa 79'	Report	Binya (yellow card) 45' (yellow-red card) 64'	Stadium: Estádio do Clube Desportivo Trofense; Attendance: 4,977; Referee: Jorge Sousa

11 January 2009 14	Benfica	1–0	Braga	Lisbon
18:30	David Luiz 45'	Report		Stadium: Estádio da Luz; Attendance: 32,837; Referee: Paulo Baptista

21 January 2009 15	Belenenses	0–0	Benfica	Lisbon
21:45		Report	Vítor (yellow card) 59' (yellow-red card) 82'	Stadium: Estádio do Restelo; Attendance: 8,548; Referee: Elmano Santos

31 January 2009 16	Benfica	1–0	Rio Ave	Lisbon
19:45	Mantorras 70'	Report		Stadium: Estádio da Luz; Attendance: 21,398; Referee: Rui Costa

8 February 2009 17	Porto	1–1	Benfica	Porto
19:45	L. González 77' (pen.)	Report	Yebda 45'	Stadium: Estádio do Dragão; Attendance: 50,110; Referee: Pedro Proença

15 February 2009 18	Benfica	3–2	Paços de Ferreira	Lisbon
20:45	Cardozo 69'; Amorim 73'; Di María 87'	Report	Ferreira 76'; Silva 90'	Stadium: Estádio da Luz; Attendance: 33,378; Referee: Cosme Machado

21 February 2009 19	Sporting CP	3–2	Benfica	Lisbon
20:00	Liédson 11', 82'; Derlei 47'	Report	Reyes 36' (pen.); Cardozo 90'	Stadium: Estádio de Alvalade; Attendance: 44,863; Referee: Olegário Benquerença

27 February 2009 20	Benfica	2–1	Leixões	Lisbon
21:00	Élvis 16' (o.g.); Nuno Gomes 67'	Report	Rodrigo Silva 74'	Stadium: Estádio da Luz; Attendance: 31,431; Referee: Lucílio Baptista

8 March 2009 21	Naval	1–2	Benfica	Figueira da Foz
20:15	Marcelinho 54'	Report	Aimar 3'; Katsouranis 73'	Stadium: Estádio Municipal José Bento Pessoa; Attendance: 8,214; Referee: João Ferreira

14 March 2009 22	Benfica	0–1	Vitória de Guimarães	Lisbon
18:45		Report	Roberto 66'; Cícero (red card) 91'	Stadium: Estádio da Luz; Attendance: 47,102; Referee: Jorge Sousa

5 April 2009 23	Estrela da Amadora	1–2	Benfica	Amadora
20:45	Varela 29' (pen.)	Report	Cardozo 5' (pen.), 15' (pen.)	Stadium: Estádio José Gomes; Attendance: 3,230; Referee: Hugo Miguel

11 April 2009 24	Benfica	0–1	Académica	Lisbon
19:00		Report	Tiero 23'; Cabral (yellow card) 56' (yellow-red card) 73'	Stadium: Estádio da Luz; Attendance: 27,747; Referee: Marco Ferreira

19 April 2009 25	Vitória de Setúbal	0–4	Benfica	Setúbal
20:15		Report	Nuno Gomes 25', 70'; Cardozo 27', 45'	Stadium: Estádio do Bonfim; Attendance: 5,690; Referee: Artur Soares Dias

26 April 2009 26	Benfica	3–2	Marítimo	Lisbon
20:00	David Luiz 29'; Cardozo 35', 38'	Report	Marcinho 44'; Bruno 60'	Stadium: Estádio da Luz; Attendance: 32,408; Referee: Rui Costa

2 May 2009 27	Nacional	3–1	Benfica	Funchal
20:45	Nenê 56'; Micael 64'; Fidalgo 90'	Report	Reyes 67'	Stadium: Estádio da Madeira; Attendance: 4,175; Referee: Jorge Sousa

9 May 2009 28	Benfica	2–2	Trofense	Lisbon
19:00	Cardozo 35', 38'	Report	Valdomiro 31'; Paulinho 59'	Stadium: Estádio da Luz; Attendance: 20,187; Referee: João Ferreira

17 May 2009 29	Braga	1–3	Benfica	Braga
19:00	Aguiar 90'	Report	Cardozo 6'; Di María 12'; Urretaviscaya 47'; Yebda (yellow card) 62' (yellow-red card) 67'	Stadium: Estádio Municipal de Braga; Attendance: 14,056; Referee: Artur Soares Dias

23 May 2009 30	Benfica	3–1	Belenenses	Lisbon
19:45	Cardozo 21'; Bastos 63'; Mantorras 91'	Report	Silas 3'; Saulo (red card) 42'	Stadium: Estádio da Luz; Attendance: 30,972; Referee: Cosme Machado

=== Taça de Portugal ===
19 October 2009 Fourth round	Benfica	0–0 (a.e.t.) (5–3 p)	Penafiel	Lisbon
20:30		Report		Stadium: Estádio da Luz; Referee: Paulo Baptista
	Penalties
	Reyes (penalty scored); Di María (penalty scored); Katsouranis (penalty scored); Amorim (penalty scored); Suazo (penalty scored)		(penalty scored) Vítor; (penalty scored) Quim; (penalty missed) Dias; (penalty scored) Vagner

10 November 2008 Fifth round	Benfica	3–0	Desportivo de Aves	Lisbon
20:30	Yebda 3'; Luisão 19'; Pereira 29'	Report		Stadium: Estádio da Luz; Attendance: 14,000; Referee: Elmano Santos

13 December 2008 Sixth round	Leixões	0–0 (a.e.t.) (5–4 p)	Benfica	Leixões
20:45		Report		Stadium: Estádio do Mar; Attendance: 7,000; Referee: Olegário Benquerença
	Penalties
	Wesley (penalty scored); Zé Manel (penalty scored); Morais (penalty scored); Laranjeiro (penalty scored); Chumbinho (penalty scored)		(penalty scored) Cardozo; (penalty scored) Katsouranis; (penalty scored) Nuno Gomes; (penalty scored) David Luiz; (penalty missed) Reyes

=== Taça da Liga ===
==== Group stage ====
7 January 2009 1	Vitória de Guimarães	0–2	Benfica	Guimarães
20:45		Report	Katsouranis 8'; Martins 80'	Stadium: Estádio D. Afonso Henriques; Attendance: 8,371; Referee: Olegário Benquerença

14 January 2009 2	Benfica	4–1	Olhanense	Lisbon
19:30	Nuno Gomes 25'; Ribeiro 29'; Sidnei 67'; Di María 87'	Report	Djalmir 13'	Stadium: Estádio da Luz; Attendance: 10,369; Referee: Marco Ferreira

17 January 2009 3	Benfica	1–0	Belenenses	Lisbon
16:00	Katsouranis 44'	Report		Stadium: Estádio da Luz; Attendance: 35,022; Referee: Bruno Paixão

4 February 2009 Semi-final	Benfica	2–1	Vitória de Guimarães	Lisbon
21:15 UTC	Grégory 69' (o.g.); Aimar 87'	Report	Desmarets 89'	Stadium: Estádio da Luz; Attendance: 13,648; Referee: Artur Soares Dias

21 March 2009 Final	Sporting CP	1–1 (a.e.t.) (2–3 p)	Benfica	Faro
19:45 UTC	Pereirinha 48'; P. Silva (yellow card) 21' (yellow-red card) 74'	Report	Reyes 75' (pen.)	Stadium: Estádio Algarve; Attendance: 27,700; Referee: Lucílio Baptista
	Penalties
	Romagnoli (penalty scored); Rochemback (penalty missed); Moutinho (penalty scored); Derlei (penalty missed); Postiga (penalty missed)		(penalty missed) Aimar; (penalty scored) Cardozo; (penalty missed) Katsouranis; (penalty scored) David Luiz; (penalty scored) Martins

=== UEFA Cup ===
==== First round ====
18 September 2008 First leg	Napoli (Italy)	3–2	(Portugal) Benfica	Naples
21:00 CET	Vitale 18'; Denis 19'; Maggio 54'	Report	Suazo 16'; Luisão 59'	Stadium: Stadio San Paolo; Attendance: 49,520; Referee: Bjorn Kuipers

2 October 2008 Second leg	Benfica (Portugal)	2–0	(Italy) Napoli	Lisbon
21:15 CET	Reyes 57'; Nuno Gomes 84'	Report		Stadium: Estádio da Luz; Attendance: 56,520; Referee: Wolfgang Stark

==== Group stage ====
Pos	Team	Pld	W	D	L	GF	GA	GD	Pts	Qualification	MET	GAL	OLY	HER	BEN
1	(Ukraine) Metalist Kharkiv	4	3	1	0	3	0	+3	10	Advance to knockout stage	—	—	1–0	0–0	—
2	(Turkey) Galatasaray	4	3	0	1	4	1	+3	9	Advance to knockout stage	0–1	—	1–0	—	—
3	(Greece) Olympiacos	4	2	0	2	9	3	+6	6	Advance to knockout stage	—	—	—	4–0	5–1
4	(Germany) Hertha BSC	4	0	2	2	1	6	−5	2		—	0–1	—	—	1–1
5	(Portugal) Benfica	4	0	1	3	2	9	−7	1		0–1	0–2	—	—	—

Source: RSSSF

23 October 2008 1	Hertha BSC (Germany)	1–1	(Portugal) Benfica	Berlin
20:30 UTC+2	Pantelić 74'	Report	Di María 51'	Stadium: Olympiastadion; Attendance: 26,144; Referee: Paul Allaerts (Belgium)

6 November 2008 2	Benfica (Portugal)	0–2	(Turkey) Galatasaray	Lisbon
19:30 UTC+0		Report	Aşık 51'; Karan 69'	Stadium: Estádio da Luz; Attendance: 47,000; Referee: Martin Atkinson (England)

27 November 2008 3	Olympiacos (Greece)	5–1	(Portugal) Benfica	Athens
20:45 UTC+2	Galletti 1'; Patsatzoglou 17'; Diogo 24', 53'; Belluschi 44'	Report	David Luiz 33'	Stadium: Karaiskakis Stadium; Attendance: 30,185; Referee: Stéphane Lannoy (France)

18 December 2008 4	Benfica (Portugal)	0–1	(Ukraine) Metalist Kharkiv	Lisbon
19:45 UTC+0		Report	Rykun 84'	Stadium: Estádio da Luz; Attendance: 9,570; Referee: Bernhard Brugger (Austria)

=== Friendlies ===
19 July 2008	Estoril	1–1	Benfica	Estoril, Portugal
17:15 CET (UTC+01)	Bruno Miguel 64'		Yebda 12'	Stadium: Estádio António Coimbra da Mota

25 July 2008 Guadiana Trophy	Benfica	2–3	Blackburn Rovers	Vila Real de Santo António, Portugal
19:30 CET (UTC+01)	Urretavizcaya 7'; Makukula 67'		Pedersen 32'; Roberts 35'; Emerton 50'	Stadium: Complexo Desportivo de Vila Real de Santo António

27 July 2008 Guadiana Trophy	Sporting CP	2–0	Benfica	Vila Real de Santo António, Portugal
19:30 CET (UTC+01)	Djaló 56'; Derlei 71'			Stadium: Complexo Desportivo de Vila Real de Santo António; Referee: Nuno Almeida

2 August 2008 Guimarães Trophy	Benfica	2–2	Paris Saint-Germain	Guimarães, Portugal
19:30 CET (UTC+01)	Makukula 74'; Cardozo 80'		Pancrate 38', 57'	Stadium: Estádio D. Afonso Henriques

4 August 2008 Guimarães Trophy	Vitória de Guimarães	1–2	Benfica	Guimarães, Portugal
19:30 CET (UTC+01)	Moreno 67'		Cardozo 19' (pen.); Momha 22' (o.g.)	Stadium: Estádio D. Afonso Henriques

9 August 2008	Benfica	1–0	Feyenoord	Lisbon, Portugal
19:00 CET (UTC+01)	Cardozo 69'			Stadium: Estádio da Luz; Referee: Pedro Henriques

15 August 2008 Eusébio Cup	Benfica	0–0 (4–5 p)	Inter Milan	Lisbon, Portugal
19:30 CET (UTC+01)				Stadium: Estádio da Luz; Attendance: 54,001; Referee: Bruno Paixão
	Penalties
	Aimar (penalty scored); Bastos (penalty missed); Reyes (penalty scored); Nuno Gomes (penalty scored); David Luiz (penalty scored); Nélson (penalty missed)		Maxwell (penalty scored); Balotelli (penalty scored); Stanković (penalty scored); Ibrahimović (penalty missed); Burdisso (penalty scored); Cambiasso (penalty scored)

== Player statistics ==
The squad for the season consisted of the players in the tables below and staff members Quique Flores (manager), Fran Escribá (assistant manager), Emilio Álvarez (goalkeeper coach), Paco Ayestaran (fitness coach), and Diamantino Miranda and Fernando Chalana as links to club management.

Note 1: Note: Flags indicate national team as defined under FIFA eligibility rules. Players may hold more than one non-FIFA nationality.

Note 2: Players with squad numbers marked ‡ joined the club during the 2008–09 season via transfer, with more details in the following section.

No.	Pos	Nat	Player	Total		Primeira Liga		Taça de Portugal		Taça da Liga		UEFA Cup	
No.	Pos	Nat	Player	Apps	Goals	Apps	Goals	Apps	Goals	Apps	Goals	Apps	Goals
1	GK	(Portugal) POR	José Moreira	17	-13	14	-12	2	0	0	0	1	-1
4	DF	(Brazil) BRA	Luisão	33	4	21	2	3	1	5	0	4	1
5	DF	(Brazil) BRA	Léo	5	0	2	0	2	0	0	0	1	0
6^{‡}	FW	(Spain) ESP	José Antonio Reyes	35	6	24	4	2	0	4	1	5	1
7	FW	(Paraguay) PAR	Óscar Cardozo	35	17	26	17	2	0	4	0	3	0
8	MF	(Greece) GRE	Kostas Katsouranis	35	4	24	2	2	0	5	2	4	0
9	FW	(Angola) ANG	Mantorras	5	2	5	2	0	0	0	0	0	0
10	MF	(Argentina) ARG	Pablo Aimar	29	2	22	1	2	0	4	1	1	0
11^{‡}	FW	(Equatorial Guinea) GEQ	Javier Balboa	17	0	10	0	3	0	1	0	3	0
12	GK	(Portugal) POR	Quim	23	-32	16	-19	0	0	2	-2	5	-11
13^{‡}	DF	(Brazil) BRA	Fellipe Bastos	4	1	2	1	0	0	1	0	1	0
14	DF	(Uruguay) URU	Maxi Pereira	41	2	28	1	2	1	5	0	6	0
15^{‡}	MF	(Portugal) POR	Ruben Amorim	35	2	26	2	2	0	5	0	2	0
16^{‡}	MF	(Uruguay) URU	Jonathan Urretaviscaya	17	1	10	1	2	0	0	0	5	0
18	MF	(Cameroon) CMR	Gilles Binya	14	0	7	0	3	0	0	0	4	0
19	FW	(Portugal) POR	Ariza Makukula	1	0	0	0	1	0	0	0	0	0
20	MF	(Argentina) ARG	Ángel Di María	35	4	24	2	1	0	5	1	5	1
21	FW	(Portugal) POR	Nuno Gomes	33	9	24	7	1	0	2	1	6	1
23	DF	(Brazil) BRA	David Luiz	27	2	19	1	2	0	4	0	2	1
24^{‡}	MF	(Portugal) POR	Carlos Martins	35	1	24	0	1	0	5	1	5	0
25^{‡}	DF	(Portugal) POR	Jorge Ribeiro	21	2	15	1	0	0	2	1	4	0
26^{‡}	MF	(Algeria) ALG	Hassan Yebda	34	2	25	1	1	1	3	0	5	0
27^{‡}	DF	(Brazil) BRA	Sidnei	35	4	24	3	3	0	2	1	6	0
28	DF	(Portugal) POR	Miguel Vítor	23	0	16	0	1	0	5	0	1	0
30^{‡}	FW	(Honduras) HON	David Suazo	22	5	12	4	3	0	3	0	4	1
31	GK	(Brazil) BRA	Marcelo Moretto	4	-2	0	0	1	0	0	0	3	-2

== Transfers ==
=== In ===
Entry date	Position	Player	From club	Fee	Ref
14 December 2007 (Note: Arrived under-age, had to wait to register as professional player due to FIFA regulations)	CM	Fellipe Bastos	Botafogo	Undisclosed	
18 April 2008	CM	Ruben Amorim	Belenenses	Undisclosed	
29 May 2008	DM	Hassan Yebda	Le Mans	Free	
25 June 2008	RW	Javier Balboa	Real Madrid	€4M	
25 June 2008	AM	Carlos Martins	Recreativo de Huelva	€3M	
12 July 2008	LW	Urretavizcaya	River Plate Uruguay	Undisclosed	
17 July 2008	AM	Pablo Aimar	Real Zaragoza	€6.5M	
18 July 2008	AM	Ivan Santos	Boavista	Undisclosed	
1 July 2008	LB	Jorge Ribeiro	Boavista	Free	
24 July 2008	CB	Sidnei	Internacional	€5M	

=== In by loan ===
Entry date	Position	Player	From club	Exit date	Ref
7 August 2008	LW	José Antonio Reyes	Atlético Madrid	30 June 2009	
28 August 2008	ST	David Suazo	Inter Milan	30 June 2009	

=== Out ===
Entry date	Position	Player	To club	Fee	Ref
9 May 2008	AM	Rui Costa	None	Retired	
4 June 2008	GK	Hans-Jörg Butt	Bayern Munich	Free	
12 June 2008	CB	Sreten Sretenović	Politehnica Timișoara	Undisclosed	
17 June 2008	LB	Miguelito	Marítimo	Undisclosed	
21 June 2008	LW	Cristian Rodríguez	Paris Saint-Germain	Loan return	
16 July 2008	RW	Paulo Jorge	Marítimo	Undisclosed	
16 July 2008	RW	Manú	Marítimo	Undisclosed	
16 July 2008	CM	João Coimbra	Marítimo	Undisclosed	
23 July 2008	CB	José Fonte	Crystal Palace	Undisclosed	
24 July 2008	RB	Pedro Correia	Racing Ferrol	Undisclosed	
29 July 2008	DM	Petit	1. FC Köln	Free	
30 July 2008	ST	Jaílson	Coritiba	Free	
31 July 2008	RW	Marco Ferreira	Ethnikos Piraeus	Free	
6 August 2008	AM	Nuno Assis	Vitória de Guimarães	Undisclosed	
11 August 2008	LB	Tiago Gomes	Osasuna	Free	
27 August 2008	RB	Nélson	Real Betis	Undisclosed	
13 January 2009	LB	Léo	Santos	Free	

=== Out by loan ===
Entry date	Position	Player	From club	Return date	Ref
19 May 2008	ST	Marcel	Grêmio	31 December 2008	
17 July 2008	LW	Fábio Coentrão	Real Zaragoza	30 June 2009	
21 July 2008	AM	Freddy Adu	Monaco	30 June 2009	
21 July 2008	DM	Romeu Ribeiro	Desportivo das Aves	30 June 2009	
22 July 2008	AM	Ivan Santos	Boavista	30 June 2009	
23 July 2008	MF	André Carvalhas	Rio Ave	30 June 2009	
6 August 2008	RB	Luís Filipe	Braga	30 June 2009	
12 August 200	LB	László Sepsi	Racing Santander	30 June 2009	
22 August 2008	CB	Rafik Halliche	Nacional	30 June 2009	
29 August 2008	CB	Edcarlos	Fluminense	31 December 2009	
19 December 2008	ST	Marcel	Vissel Kobe	31 December 2009	
5 January 2009	LW	Fábio Coentrão	Rio Ave	30 June 2009	
16 January 2009	ST	Ariza Makukula	Bolton Wanderers	30 June 2009	
2 February 2009	CB	Marco Zoro	Vitória de Setúbal	30 June 2009	
2 February 2009	ST	Yu Dabao	Olivais e Moscavide	30 June 2009	
