= 2010 Taça da Liga final =

- Event: 2009–10 Taça da Liga
Benfica	Porto
3	0
- Date: 21 March 2010
- Venue: Estádio do Algarve, Faro
- Referee: Jorge Sousa
- Attendance: 23,430

The 2010 Taça da Liga final was the third final of the Taça da Liga competition in Portugal. The final was played at the Estádio Algarve in Faro on 21 March 2010 and marked the third time that the final has been staged at the stadium since the competition began. The match opposed two teams of the Big Three, S.L. Benfica and FC Porto. The last time this two teams met in any Portuguese final was at the 2004 Taça de Portugal final, also won by Benfica.

== Background ==
Benfica went into the match as the Portuguese League Cup title holder, as they having previously won in 2009, while this was the first time for Porto in the final.

== Route to the final ==
Note: In all results below, the score of the finalist is given first (H: home; A: away).

Benfica			Round	Porto		
Opponent	Result	Stadium	First round	Opponent	Result	Stadium
Bye			First round	Bye		
Opponent	Result	Stadium	Second round	Opponent	Result	Stadium
Bye			Second round	Bye		
Opponent	Result	Stadium	Third round	Opponent	Result	Stadium
Nacional	1–0 (H)	Estádio da Luz	Matchday 1	Leixões	1–0 (H)	Estádio do Dragão
Vitória de Guimarães	1–1 (A)	Estádio D. Afonso Henriques	Matchday 2	Académica	0–0 (A)	Estádio Cidade de Coimbra
Rio Ave	2–1 (A)	Estádio dos Arcos	Matchday 3	Estoril	2–0 (A)	Estádio António Coimbra da Mota
Group C winners: Pos / Team / Pld / W / D / L / GF / GA / GD / Pts / Qualification; 1 / Benfica / 3 / 2 / 1 / 0 / 4 / 2 / +2 / 7 / Advance to knockout phase; 2 / Rio Ave / 3 / 1 / 1 / 1 / 4 / 4 / 0 / 4; 3 / Nacional / 3 / 1 / 1 / 1 / 2 / 2 / 0 / 4; 4 / Vitória de Guimarães / 3 / 0 / 1 / 2 / 2 / 4 / −2 / 1; Source:			Final standings	Group A winners: Pos / Team / Pld / W / D / L / GF / GA / GD / Pts / Qualification; 1 / Porto / 3 / 2 / 1 / 0 / 3 / 0 / +3 / 7 / Advance to knockout phase; 2 / Académica / 3 / 2 / 1 / 0 / 3 / 1 / +2 / 7 / Advance to knockout phase; 3 / Leixões / 3 / 0 / 1 / 2 / 1 / 3 / −2 / 1; 4 / Estoril / 3 / 0 / 1 / 2 / 2 / 5 / −3 / 1; Source:		
Opponent	Result	Stadium	Knockout phase	Opponent	Result	Stadium
Sporting CP	4–1 (A)	Estádio de Alvalade	Semi-finals	Académica	1–0 (H)	Estádio do Dragão

== Match ==
=== Summary ===
==== First half ====
Benfica controlled the first half of the game hence, scoring two goals. The first goal was scored by Ruben Amorim and it was a low, long-range effort that the goalkeeper parried into the net. The second goal was a long-range free kick scored by Carlos Martins.

==== Second half ====
Óscar Cardozo scored the third after Ruben Amorim hit the post.

=== Details ===
21 March 2010
19:15 BST

Benfica	3–0	Porto
Amorim 10'; Martins 45'; Cardozo 90+2'

Estádio Algarve, Faro
Attendance: 23,430
Referee: Jorge Sousa

Benfica
Porto

Benfica:
GK	12	(Portugal) Quim
RB	14	(Uruguay) Maxi Pereira	(yellow card) 39'
CB	4	(Brazil) Luisão (c)
CB	23	(Brazil) David Luiz
LB	18	(Portugal) Fábio Coentrão	(yellow card) 86'
DM	2	(Brazil) Airton
LW	5	(Portugal) Ruben Amorim
AM	17	(Portugal) Carlos Martins		(substituted off) 67'
RW	20	(Argentina) Ángel Di María
ST	10	(Argentina) Pablo Aimar	(yellow card) 45'	(substituted off) 62'
ST	31	(Brazil) Alan Kardec		(substituted off) 77'
Substitutes:
GK	1	(Portugal) José Moreira
DF	27	(Brazil) Sidnei
MF	6	(Spain) Javi García
MF	8	(Brazil) Ramires	(yellow card) 89'	(substituted on) 67'
FW	21	(Portugal) Nuno Gomes
FW	30	(Argentina) Javier Saviola		(substituted on) 62'
FW	7	(Paraguay) Óscar Cardozo		(substituted on) 77'
Manager:
(Portugal) Jorge Jesus

Porto:
GK	33	(Portugal) Nuno
RB	22	(Portugal) Miguel Lopes	(yellow card) 11'	(substituted off) 45'
CB	14	(Portugal) Rolando
CB	2	(Portugal) Bruno Alves (c)	(yellow card) 45'
LB	15	(Uruguay) Álvaro Pereira
DM	25	(Brazil) Fernando
CM	28	(Portugal) Rúben Micael		(substituted off) 45'
CM	3	(Portugal) Raul Meireles
RW	7	(Argentina) Fernando Belluschi	(yellow card) 37'	(substituted off) 71'
LW	10	(Uruguay) Cristian Rodríguez
ST	9	(Colombia) Radamel Falcao
Substitutes:
GK	24	(Portugal) Beto
RB	13	(Uruguay) Jorge Fucile	(yellow card) 52'	(substituted on) 46'
DF	16	(Brazil) Maicon
MF	6	(Colombia) Fredy Guarín
MF	20	(Argentina) Tomás Costa
MF	8	(Argentina) Diego Valeri		(substituted on) 46'
FW	29	(Portugal) Orlando Sá		(substituted on) 71'
Manager:
(Portugal) Jesualdo Ferreira

2009–10 Taça da Liga winners

2nd title

== See also ==
- O Clássico
- 2009–10 FC Porto season
- 2009–10 S.L. Benfica season
- 2010 Taça de Portugal final
