= 2009 Taça da Liga final =

2009 Portuguese League Cup final
- Event: 2008–09 Taça da Liga
Sporting CP	Benfica
1	1
- Benfica won 3–2 on penalties
- Date: 21 March 2009
- Venue: Estádio do Algarve, Faro
- Man of the Match: Quim (Benfica)
- Referee: Lucílio Batista (Setúbal)
- Attendance: 28,182

The 2009 Taça da Liga final was a football match between Benfica and Sporting CP which was held on the 21 March 2009 at Estádio do Algarve, Faro. It was the final match of the 2008–09 Taça da Liga, the 2nd season of the Taça da Liga, a football competition for the 32 teams in the Primeira Liga and the Liga de Honra. Benfica were appearing in their first final, while Sporting were appearing in the final for the second time; having lost the previous season's final to Vitória de Setúbal.

After a goalless and uneventful first half, Sporting scored the first goal of the game through Bruno Pereirinha in the 48th minute. Benfica equalized in the 75th minute through Spanish winger José Antonio Reyes who converted from the penalty spot. After ninety minutes where the game remained tied, the final was to be settled on penalties. After Quim saved Hélder Postiga's penalty, Carlos Martins stepped up to the penalty spot and scored the decisive penalty to clinch Benfica's first Taça da Liga. This was Benfica's first trophy in four years since winning their 31st Primeira Liga in the 2004–05 season.

== Background ==
Sporting CP were appearing in their second final after losing the previous edition's final to Vitória de Setúbal. Benfica were appearing in their very first Taça da Liga final. This final marked the first time that two teams of the Big three would face each other, in a Taça da Liga final.

The last meeting between these two sides prior to the final was a league match, which took place on the 21 February. Sporting defeated Benfica 3–2 at the Estádio José Alvalade. The last meeting between these two sides in a cup competition saw Sporting defeat Benfica, 5–3 in the semi-final of the 2007–08 Taça de Portugal.

== Route to the final ==
Note: In all results below, the score of the finalist is given first (H: home; A: away).

Sporting CP			Round	Benfica		
Opponent	Result	Stadium	First round	Opponent	Result	Stadium
Bye			First round	Bye		
Opponent	Result	Stadium	Second round	Opponent	Result	Stadium
Bye			Second round	Bye		
Opponent	Result	Stadium	Third round	Opponent	Result	Stadium
Marítimo	3–0 (H)	Estádio de Alvalade	Matchday 1	Vitória de Guimarães	2–0 (A)	Estádio D. Afonso Henriques
Rio Ave	1–0 (A)	Estádio dos Arcos	Matchday 2	Olhanense	4–1 (H)	Estádio da Luz
Paços de Ferreira	5–1 (H)	Estádio de Alvalade	Matchday 3	Belenenses	1–0 (H)	Estádio da Luz
Group B winners: Team / Pld / W / D / L / GF / GA / GD / Pts; Sporting CP / 3 / 3 / 0 / 0 / 9 / 1 / +8 / 9; Rio Ave / 3 / 1 / 0 / 2 / 3 / 4 / −1 / 3; Marítimo / 3 / 1 / 0 / 2 / 3 / 6 / −3 / 3; Paços de Ferreira / 3 / 0 / 0 / 3 / 4 / 8 / −4 / 3			Final standings	Group C winners: Team / Pld / W / D / L / GF / GA / GD / Pts; Benfica / 3 / 3 / 0 / 0 / 7 / 1 / +6 / 9; Vitória de Guimarães / 3 / 1 / 1 / 1 / 3 / 2 / +1 / 4; Belenenses / 3 / 1 / 1 / 1 / 2 / 1 / +1 / 4; Olhanense / 3 / 0 / 0 / 3 / 1 / 9 / −8 / 0		
Opponent	Result	Stadium	Knockout phase	Opponent	Result	Stadium
Porto	4–1 (H)	Estádio de Alvalade	Semi-finals	Vitória de Guimarães	2–1 (H)	Estádio da Luz

== Match ==
=== Team selection ===
Both clubs entered the 2009 Taça da Liga Final with players missing due to injury. Sporting CP were missing midfielder Marat Izmailov due to tendinitis in his right knee, as well as left back Leandro Grimi, who was undergoing an operation to his left knee. Benfica entered the final missing goalkeeper Marcelo Moretto, Quique Sánchez Flores' first-choice goalkeeper in the 2008–09 Taça da Liga. Moretto missed the final due to undergoing arthroscopic surgery to his right knee after he sustained an injury during a Benfica training session. Both sides going into the match, saw players who were doubtful for the final. Sporting's Hélder Postiga was a doubt for the final. Benfica's Ruben Amorim was also a doubt for the final after sustaining an injury in a league match, while Carlos Martins and David Suazo were also doubts. These three players would train apart from the rest of the squad in order to be match fit for the final during the week building up to the match.

Paulo Bento's squad selection for the final saw the presence of Hélder Postiga and Leandro Romagnoli who were doubtful going into the game. Paulo Bento's starting eleven saw him start with veteran goalkeeper Tiago ahead of Rui Patrício. Due to Leandro Grimi's injury, Pedro Silva would replace him in the left back position. Quique Sánchez Flores' squad selection for the final saw the inclusion of Carlos Martins, David Suazo and Ruben Amorim who were doubtful prior to the game. Sánchez Flores' starting eleven saw him start Amorim and Suazo. Veteran goalkeeper Quim was selected ahead of José Moreira. Sánchez Flores also selected Miguel Vítor ahead of first-team regular Sidnei in the starting lineup.

=== Summary ===
Benfica dominated possession early on and created several chances. The first major chance of the game saw a Benfica counterattack, saw Pablo Aimar brake into Sporting's final third and thread a ball to an unmarked Nuno Gomes who couldn't slot the ball past Tiago. Sporting's most dangerous chance of the first half, saw Simon Vukčević lob the ball over the Benfica defense where he found an unmarked Liédson, who went past Benfica's goalkeeper and fired into the goal at an acute angle but saw his shot blocked on the goal line by David Luiz. The first half would end goalless.

Following the break, Sporting started the second half stronger and scored the first goal of the game. Clever interplay between Simon Vukčević and Marco Caneira down the left hand side saw Caneira cross the ball into the box where Liédson's header hit the crossbar and on the follow-up, Bruno Pereirinha slotted the ball past Quim. Following Sporting's goal, its lead could have been doubled but for Quim's save after Fábio Rochemback's corner found Ânderson Polga. Benfica came close to an equalizer following Sporting's most dominant period of the game after José Antonio Reyes' free kick found Luisão whose header hit the crossbar.

Fifteen minutes from the end, Ángel Di María's run would result in Benfica being awarded a penalty after Pedro Silva handled the ball in the box when trying to challenge Di María. Replays showed that the ball hit Silva on the chest. Sporting's Pedro Silva would receive a second yellow card, which resulted in Sporting being a man down. José Antonio Reyes would convert the penalty and slot the ball past Tiago. The game ended in a tie after ninety minutes and was to be settled on penalties. In the penalty shootout after each side had taken three penalties each, Sporting were 2–1 up. The next two penalties which each side took proved to be vital to who would win the cup. Sporting's Derlei and Hélder Postiga missed their penalties, while David Luiz and Carlos Martins converted the penalties to clinch Benfica's first Taça da Liga.

=== Details ===
21 March 2009
19:45 BST

Sporting CP	1–1	Benfica
Pereirinha 48'		Reyes 75' (pen.)
Penalties
Romagnoli (penalty scored); Rochemback (penalty missed); Moutinho (penalty scored); Derlei (penalty missed); Postiga (penalty missed)	2–3	(penalty missed) Aimar; (penalty scored) Cardozo; (penalty missed) Katsouranis; (penalty scored) David Luiz; (penalty scored) Martins

Estádio do Algarve, Faro
Attendance: 28,182
Referee: Lucílio Baptista

Sporting	Benfica

Sporting:
GK	16	(Portugal) Tiago
RB	12	(Portugal) Marco Caneira
CB	3	(Portugal) Daniel Carriço
CB	4	(Brazil) Ânderson Polga	(yellow card) 62'
LB	5	(Brazil) Pedro Silva	(yellow card) 23' (yellow-red card) 73'
DM	26	(Brazil) Fábio Rochemback
LM	10	(Montenegro) Simon Vukčević		(substituted off) 76'
OM	28	(Portugal) João Moutinho (c)	(yellow card) 72'
RM	25	(Portugal) Bruno Pereirinha		(substituted off) 90'
CF	11	(Brazil) Derlei
CF	31	(Brazil) Liédson		(substituted off) 90'
Substitutes:
GK	1	(Portugal) Rui Patrício
DF	13	(Portugal) Tonel
RB	78	(Portugal) Abel		(substituted in) 76'
MD	6	(Portugal) Adrien Silva
OM	30	(Argentina) Leandro Romagnoli		(substituted in) 90'
FW	20	(Portugal) Yannick Djaló
FW	23	(Portugal) Hélder Postiga		(substituted in) 90'
Manager:
(Portugal) Paulo Bento

Benfica:
GK	12	(Portugal) Quim
RB	13	(Uruguay) Maxi Pereira	(yellow card) 39'
CB	4	(Brazil) Luisão
CB	28	(Portugal) Miguel Vítor	(yellow card) 68'
LB	23	(Brazil) David Luiz
DM	8	(Greece) Kostas Katsouranis
RM	15	(Portugal) Ruben Amorim		(substituted off) 79'
OM	10	(Argentina) Pablo Aimar
LM	6	(Spain) José Antonio Reyes	(yellow card) 40'	(substituted off) 88'
FW	30	(Honduras) David Suazo
FW	21	(Portugal) Nuno Gomes (c)		(substituted off) 64'
Substitutes:
GK	1	(Portugal) José Moreira
LB	25	(Portugal) Jorge Ribeiro
DF	27	(Brazil) Sidnei
MF	26	(Algeria) Hassan Yebda
OM	24	(Portugal) Carlos Martins		(substituted in) 79'
RM	20	(Argentina) Ángel Di María		(substituted in) 64'
FW	7	(Paraguay) Óscar Cardozo		(substituted in) 88'
Manager:
(Spain) Quique Sánchez Flores

2008–09 Taça da Liga Winners
S.L. Benfica
1st Title

Man of the match

- (Portugal) Quim (Benfica)

Match officials

- Assistant referees:
  - Pais António (Setúbal)
  - José Cardinal (Porto)
- Fourth official: Artur Soares Dias (Porto)

Match rules

- 90 minutes
- Penalty shoot-out if scores still level.
- Maximum of three substitutions

== See also ==
- Derby de Lisboa
- 2008–09 S.L. Benfica season
- 2009 Taça de Portugal final
