= 2009 Taça de Portugal final =

- Event: 2008–09 Taça de Portugal
Paços de Ferreira	Porto
0	1
- Date: 31 May 2009
- Venue: Estádio Nacional, Oeiras
- Referee: Paulo Costa (Porto)
- Attendance: 37,552

The 2009 Taça de Portugal final was the final match of the 2008–09 Taça de Portugal, the 69th season of the Taça de Portugal, the premier Portuguese football cup competition organized by the Portuguese Football Federation (FPF). The match was played on 31 May 2009 at the Estádio Nacional in Oeiras, and opposed two Primeira Liga sides: Paços de Ferreira and Porto. Porto defeated Paços de Ferreira 1–0 thanks to a sixth-minute goal from Argentine forward Lisandro López, which would give Porto their 14th Taça de Portugal.

In Portugal, the final was televised live in HD on TVI and Sport TV. As Porto claimed both league and cup double in the same season, cup runners-up Paços de Ferreira faced their cup final opponents in the 2009 Supertaça Cândido de Oliveira at the Estádio Municipal de Aveiro.

== Match ==
=== Details ===
31 May 2009
17:00 WEST

Paços de Ferreira	0–1	Porto
		Lisandro López 6'

Estádio Nacional, Oeiras
Attendance: 37,600
Referee: Paulo Costa (Porto)

Paços de Ferreira	Porto

GK	1	(Brazil) Cássio
RB	19	(Cape Verde) Ricardo
CB	4	(Brazil) Danielson
CB	17	(France) Kelly Berville	(yellow card) 89'
LB	14	(Portugal) Jorginho	(yellow card) 86'
CM	8	(Portugal) Pedrinha (c)		(substituted off) 80'
CM	77	(Angola) Dédé		(substituted off) 72'
CM	96	(Portugal) Filipe Anunciação	(yellow card) 90+3'
RW	18	(Portugal) Rui Miguel
LW	13	(Argentina) Livio Prieto		(substituted off) 64'
CF	10	(Brazil) Cristiano
Substitutes:
GK	1	(Portugal) Pedro
DF	3	(Portugal) Chico Silva		(substituted on) 80'
DF	5	(Brazil) Ozéia
DF	30	(Brazil) Antonielton Ferreira		(substituted on) 72'
MF	6	(Portugal) Paulo Sousa
FW	9	(Brazil) William		(substituted on) 64'
FW	74	(Portugal) Carlos Carneiro
Manager:
(Portugal) Paulo Sérgio

GK	33	(Portugal) Nuno
RB	13	(Uruguay) Jorge Fucile
CB	14	(Portugal) Rolando
CB	2	(Portugal) Bruno Alves (c)
LB	28	(France) Aly Cissokho
DM	25	(Brazil) Fernando
CM	16	(Portugal) Raul Meireles
CM	11	(Argentina) Mariano González		(substituted off) 68'
RW	12	(Brazil) Hulk		(substituted off) 89'
LW	10	(Uruguay) Cristian Rodríguez	(yellow card) 83'	(substituted off) 86'
CF	9	(Argentina) Lisandro López
Substitutes:
GK	24	(Portugal) Hugo Ventura
DF	3	(Portugal) Pedro Emanuel
DF	21	(Romania) Cristian Săpunaru
MF	6	(Colombia) Fredy Guarín		(substituted on) 86'
MF	17	(Morocco) Tarik Sektioui
MF	20	(Argentina) Tomás Costa		(substituted on) 68'
FW	19	(Argentina) Ernesto Farías		(substituted on) 89'
Manager:
(Portugal) Jesualdo Ferreira

2008–09 Taça de Portugal Winners
Porto
14th Title

Match officials

- Assistant referees:
  - Bertino Miranda (Porto)
  - João Santos (Porto)
- Fourth official: Artur Soares Dias (Porto)

Match rules

- 90 minutes
- Penalty shoot-out if scores level after 90 minutes
- Seven named substitutes
- Maximum of three substitutions

== See also ==
- 2008–09 FC Porto season
- 2009 Taça da Liga final
