= Luís Dias =

Luís Dias may refer to:

- Luís Filipe Veiga Dias (born 1981), Portuguese football defender
- Luís Manuel Braga Dias (born 1987), Portuguese football defender
- Luis Días (composer) (1952–2009), Dominican Republic musician and composer
- Luís Henrique Dias (born 1960), Brazilian former footballer
- Luís Germano Borlotes Dias, footballer
- Luís Dias (politician) (born 1983), Portuguese politician
