= Quim (footballer, born 1975) =

Portuguese footballer

Personal information
- Full name: Joaquim Manuel Sampaio da Silva
- Date of birth: 13 November 1975 (age 50)
- Place of birth: Vila Nova de Famalicão, Portugal
- Height: 1.84 m (6 ft 0 in)
- Position: Goalkeeper

Youth career
- 1988–1989: Ruivanense
- 1989–1994: Braga

Senior career*
Years	Team	Apps	(Gls)
1994–2004	Braga	208	(0)
2004–2010	Benfica	131	(0)
2010–2013	Braga	43	(0)
2013–2018	Aves	180	(0)
Total		562	(0)

International career
1990–1992	Portugal U16	6	(0)
1992	Portugal U17	2	(0)
1992–1993	Portugal U18	11	(0)
1994–1995	Portugal U20	12	(0)
1997–1998	Portugal U21	5	(0)
1999–2008	Portugal	32	(0)
Medal record
Men's football
Representing Portugal
UEFA European Championship
Runner-up	2004 Portugal
Bronze medal – third place	2000 Belgium-Netherlands
FIFA U-20 World Cup
Third place	1995 Qatar
- * Club domestic league appearances and goals

Joaquim Manuel Sampaio da Silva OIH (born 13 November 1975), known as Quim (Portuguese pronunciation: [kĩ]), is a Portuguese former professional footballer who played as a goalkeeper.

He appeared in 396 Primeira Liga matches during his career, over 12 seasons with Braga, six with Benfica and one with Aves, and won five major titles with the second club.

Quim represented Portugal at the 2006 World Cup and in two European Championships, earning 32 caps.

== Club career ==
=== Braga ===
Born in Vila Nova de Famalicão, Braga District, Quim started his career at S.C. Braga.

He played his first game in the Primeira Liga during the 1994–95 season, becoming the club's first-choice shortly after.

=== Benfica ===
On 7 July 2004, Quim joined S.L. Benfica on a five-year contract, sharing the goal with José Moreira in the title-winning 2004–05. He began the following campaign as starter, but injury to him as well as Moreira saw Marcelo Moretto being signed during the winter break, controversially earning a place in the starting eleven.

Quim's fortunes turned around at the beginning of 2006–07, as new coach Fernando Santos announced that he would be his main goalkeeper. Subsequently, the player rarely put in a bad performance since regaining first-choice status, even when the manager was dismissed early into the next season.

In 2008–09, with Benfica retaining the same three goalkeepers under Quique Sánchez Flores, Quim started the campaign, lost the job to Moreira in between, was even demoted to third-string (with Moretto starting in the Taça da Liga) and finished again as starter, with the team eventually ranking third. He also took the field in the final of the latter competition, and saved three penalty shoot-out attempts against Sporting CP for the win.

=== Braga return ===
In the 2009–10 season, Quim played all the matches and minutes as Benfica won the league for the first time in five years, adding to this the honour of conceding the least goals (20). At the end of June 2010, however, the 34-year-old was released, returning to first professional club Braga on a three-year deal, but spent his first year on the sidelines nursing an achilles tendon injury.

Quim returned as first choice for 2011–12, helping Braga to the third place with the subsequent qualification for the UEFA Champions League. However, after the arrival of Beto from FC Porto the following campaign, he made only six competitive appearances in its first part, including once in the league against S.C. Beira-Mar and the 1–2 Champions League home loss to Galatasaray SK.

After Beto left for Sevilla FC in January 2013 Quim was reinstated as the starter, one of his first appearances being a 0–0 home draw with his former side Benfica in the League Cup semi-finals, won in a penalty shootout. Manager José Peseiro also selected him for the competition's decider against Porto, where a penalty by Alan signified the game's only goal and Braga's first trophy win in 47 years.

=== Later career ===
In May 2013, Quim announced he would not renew his contract and subsequently retire after 19 years as a professional; he played his last match on the 11th against C.D. Nacional, a 1–3 home loss for his 382nd game in the Portuguese top division. However, two months later, he went back on his decision and signed for C.D. Aves in the Segunda Liga.

On 17 May 2016, Quim renewed his contract for another year. He was still first-choice in 2016–17, when his team returned to the top flight after ten years.

In the following season, Quim faced stiff competition from newly signed Adriano Facchini in the league, but the 42-year-old started in the club's victorious run in the Taça de Portugal, which marked its first major conquest in 87 years of history. He remained connected to Aves after his retirement, as director of Institutional Relations.

Quim worked as a goalkeeper coach subsequently, at Aves, Rio Ave FC, F.C. Tirsense and C.D. Trofense.

== International career ==
After representing his country at every level from the under-16s upwards, and winning the UEFA European Under-19 Championship (then under-18) in 1994, Quim made his senior debut in August 1999 in a 4–0 victory over Andorra, after which he was Portugal's third-choice at UEFA Euro 2000, enjoying a short cameo as a substitute in the 3–0 win against Germany in the group stage's final round before establishing himself as number one in the 2002 FIFA World Cup qualifying campaign. However, he missed out on the competition held in South Korea and Japan after testing positive for nandrolone on 15 February and being handed a six-month suspension.

Quim was a backup for the national side during both Euro 2004 and the 2006 World Cup, behind the habitual Ricardo. He was originally named in the squad for Euro 2008 but suffered a wrist injury the day before their first game, ruling him out of the tournament – he was replaced by Porto's Nuno.

Quim started the 2010 World Cup qualifying campaign as first-choice, but lost his place midway through it to another Braga player, Eduardo, as Portugal eventually qualified. After being league champion for Benfica, he would be left out of the squad for the final stages in South Africa.

== Career statistics ==
=== Club ===
As of 24 January 2017

Club	Season	League		Cup		League Cup		Europe		Total	
Club	Season	Apps	Goals	Apps	Goals	Apps	Goals	Apps	Goals	Apps	Goals
Braga	1994–95	1	0	0	0	—	—	—	—	1	0
Braga	1995–96	1	0	0	0	—	—	—	—	1	0
Braga	1996–97	3	0	3	0	—	—	—	—	6	0
Braga	1997–98	19	0	7	0	—	—	0	0	26	0
Braga	1998–99	29	0	0	0	—	—	1	0	30	0
Braga	1999–00	34	0	1	0	—	—	—	—	35	0
Braga	2000–01	34	0	0	0	—	—	—	—	34	0
Braga	2001–02	22	0	5	0	—	—	—	—	27	0
Braga	2002–03	33	0	2	0	—	—	—	—	35	0
Braga	2003–04	32	0	3	0	—	—	—	—	35	0
Braga	Total	208	0	21	0	–	–	1	0	230	0
Benfica	2004–05	19	0	3	0	—	—	0	0	22	0
Benfica	2005–06	7	0	2	0	—	—	3	0	12	0
Benfica	2006–07	29	0	3	0	—	—	13	0	45	0
Benfica	2007–08	30	0	1	0	1	0	12	0	44	0
Benfica	2008–09	16	0	2	0	2	0	5	0	25	0
Benfica	2009–10	30	0	0	0	2	0	1	0	33	0
Benfica	Total	131	0	11	0	5	0	34	0	181	0
Braga	2010–11	0	0	0	0	0	0	0	0	0	0
Braga	2011–12	29	0	0	0	2	0	10	0	41	0
Braga	2012–13	14	0	4	0	5	0	1	0	24	0
Braga	Total	43	0	4	0	7	0	11	0	65	0
Aves	2013–14	44	0	2	0	0	0	—	—	46	0
Aves	2014–15	42	0	2	0	2	0	—	—	46	0
Aves	2015–16	44	0	0	0	1	0	—	—	45	0
Aves	2016–17	23	0	0	0	1	0	—	—	24	0
Aves	Total	153	0	4	0	4	0	—	—	161	0
Career Total		535	0	40	0	16	0	46	0	637	0

=== International ===
National team	Year	Apps	Goals
Portugal	1999	1	0
Portugal	2000	6	0
Portugal	2001	5	0
Portugal	2002	3	0
Portugal	2003	4	0
Portugal	2004	2	0
Portugal	2005	3	0
Portugal	2007	1	0
Portugal	2008	7	0
Total		32	0

== Honours ==
Benfica

- Primeira Liga: 2004–05, 2009–10
- Supertaça Cândido de Oliveira: 2005
- Taça da Liga: 2008–09, 2009–10
- Taça de Portugal runner-up: 2004–05

Braga

- Taça da Liga: 2012–13
- Taça de Portugal runner-up: 1997–98
- Supertaça Cândido de Oliveira runner-up: 1998

Aves

- Taça de Portugal: 2017–18

Portugal

- UEFA European Championship runner-up: 2004
- UEFA European Under-19 Championship: 1994

Individual

- Segunda Liga Best Goalkeeper: 2013–14, 2014–15

Orders

- Medal of Merit, Order of the Immaculate Conception of Vila Viçosa (House of Braganza)

== See also ==
- List of doping cases in sport
