= 2008 Guadiana Trophy =

The 2008 Guadiana Trophy competition took place between 25 and 27 July 2008 and featured Benfica, Sporting Clube de Portugal, and Blackburn Rovers. Sporting won in the final match against rivals Benfica.

== Matches ==
=== Day 1 ===
2008-07-25
21:15

Benfica (Portugal)	2 – 3	(England) Blackburn Rovers
Urreta 7'; Makukula 67'		Morten Pedersen 32'; Jason Roberts 35'; Brett Emerton 50'

Complexo Desportivo de Vila Real de Santo António, Vila Real de Santo António

=== Day 2 ===
2008-07-26
21:15

Sporting CP (Portugal)	2 – 1	(England) Blackburn Rovers
Pedro Silva 21'; Tonel 73'		Benni McCarthy 20' (g.p.)

Complexo Desportivo de Vila Real de Santo António, Vila Real de Santo António

=== Day 3 ===
2008-07-27
21:15

Benfica (Portugal)	0 – 2	(Portugal) Sporting CP
		Yannick Djaló 56'; Derlei 71'

Complexo Desportivo de Vila Real Santo de António, Vila Real de Santo António
