= Paulinho (footballer, born August 1983) =

Brazilian footballer

Personal information
- Full name: Paulo Roberto Teles Goes Sobrinho
- Date of birth: 24 August 1983 (age 43)
- Place of birth: Bahia, Brazil
- Height: 1.75 m (5 ft 9 in)
- Position: Right back

Senior career*
Years	Team	Apps	(Gls)
2002–2005	Bahia		
2006	Juventus-SP		
2007	Bahia		
2007–2008	Vitória Setúbal	24	(1)
2008–2010	Trofense	26	(1)
2010–2012	Olympiakos Nicosia	51	(1)
2012–2013	Apollon Limassol	12	(0)
2013–2015	Ermis	53	(2)
2015–2017	Doxa	57	(4)
2017–2021	Jacuipense	32	(0)
- * Club domestic league appearances and goals

Paulo Roberto Teles Goes Sobrinho (born 24 August 1983), known as Paulinho, is a Brazilian former professional footballer who played mainly as a right back.

== Honours ==
Vitória Setúbal

- Taça da Liga: 2007–08

Ermis Aradippou

- Cypriot Super Cup: 2014
