= Élvis Pereira =

Brazilian footballer

Personal information
- Full name: Élvis Alves Pereira
- Date of birth: August 23, 1977 (age 49)
- Place of birth: São Paulo, Brazil
- Height: 1.85 m (6 ft 1 in)
- Position: Defender

Team information
- Current team: Aves
- Number: 44

Senior career*
Years	Team	Apps	(Gls)
1997–1998	Portuguesa	7	(0)
1999	Goiás	28	(0)
2000–2002	Portuguesa	25	(1)
2003	CRB	10	(0)
2004	União Barbarense	–	(–)
2004–2009	Leixões	142	(5)
2009–2011	Feirense	33	(2)
2011–2012	Trofense	22	(0)
2012–	Aves	24	(0)
- * Club domestic league appearances and goals as of 5 February 2013, 18:14 UTC

Élvis Alves Pereira (born 23 August 1977, in São Paulo), is a Brazilian footballer who plays as a defender for Segunda Liga side Desportivo das Aves.
