= Reguila =

Portuguese footballer

Personal information
- Full name: Nuno Filipe Rodrigues Silva
- Date of birth: 18 April 1979 (age 47)
- Place of birth: Vila Verde, Portugal
- Height: 1.78 m (5 ft 10 in)
- Position: Striker

Youth career
- 1991–1993: Cervães
- 1993–1996: Merelinense

Senior career*
Years	Team	Apps	(Gls)
1996–1998	Laje		
1999	Merelinense		
1999–2002	Sporting Ucha		
2002–2012	Trofense	195	(78)
2004–2005	→ Gondomar (loan)	27	(4)
2012–2013	Santa Clara	32	(10)
2013–2014	Famalicão	27	(6)
2014–2015	Vilaverdense	25	(4)
2015–2016	Brito	31	(4)
2016–2019	Forjães		
2019–2020	Académico Martim	21	(5)
- * Club domestic league appearances and goals

Nuno Filipe Rodrigues Silva (born 18 April 1979 in Vila Verde, Braga District), known as Reguila, is a Portuguese former professional footballer who played as a striker.
