= Hassan Yebda =

Footballer (born 1984)

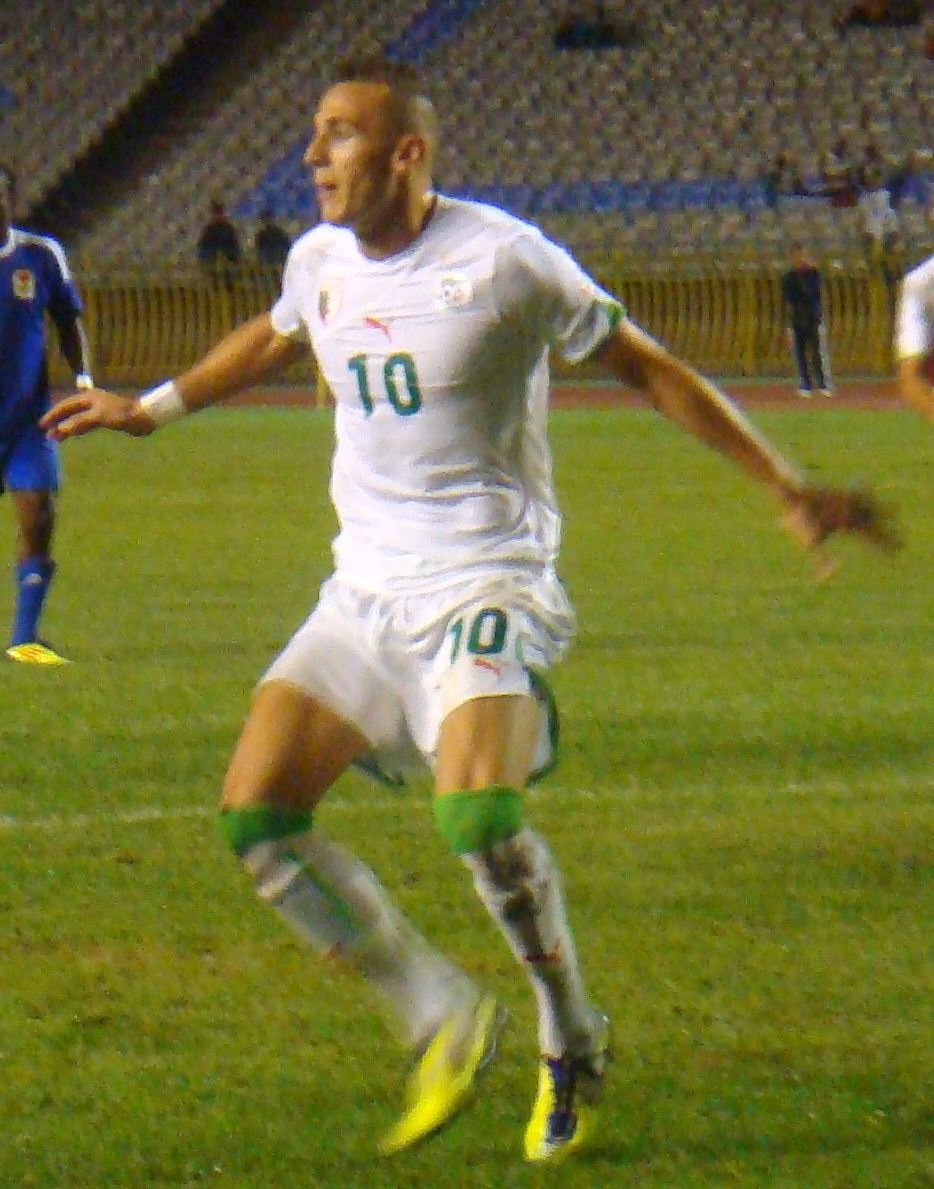
- Yebda playing with Algeria in 2011

Personal information
- Full name: Hassan Yebda
- Date of birth: 14 May 1984 (age 42)
- Place of birth: Saint-Maurice, France
- Height: 1.88 m (6 ft 2 in)
- Position: Midfielder

Youth career
- 2000–2004: Auxerre

Senior career*
Years	Team	Apps	(Gls)
2004–2007	Auxerre	0	(0)
2006	→ Laval (loan)	14	(1)
2007–2008	Le Mans	24	(3)
2008–2011	Benfica	25	(1)
2009–2010	→ Portsmouth (loan)	18	(2)
2010–2011	→ Napoli (loan)	29	(0)
2011–2014	Granada	26	(1)
2014	→ Udinese (loan)	10	(0)
2014–2015	Fujairah	13	(1)
2016–2018	Belenenses	43	(3)
Total		202	(12)

International career
2000–2001	France U16	10	(0)
2001–2002	France U17	19	(2)
2002–2003	France U18	14	(1)
2003–2004	France U19	13	(0)
2009–2014	Algeria	26	(2)
- * Club domestic league appearances and goals

Hassan Yebda (Arabic: حسان يبدة; born 14 May 1984) is a former professional footballer who played as a central midfielder.

During his professional career, he played in France, Portugal, England, Italy and Spain, representing a host of clubs.

Yebda appeared for France at youth level, but opted to play for Algeria as a senior in August 2009, taking advantage of FIFA's new ruling which allowed him to change his national allegiance despite being older than 21 years of age. He represented the latter national team in two World Cups and the 2010 Africa Cup of Nations.

== Club career ==
=== France ===
Born in Saint-Maurice, Val-de-Marne, Yebda emerged through AJ Auxerre's youth system, but made no appearances for the first team during his stint, playing regularly for the reserves in the Championnat de France amateur.

In January 2006, he was loaned to Ligue 2's Stade Lavallois. In the same month of the following year, Yebda was definitely released and moved to Le Mans UC72, making his Ligue 1 debut on 17 February 2007 in a 2–0 away loss against Sochaux. Brought on in the 70th minute, he scored an own goal ten minutes later, in his only appearance of the season.

=== Benfica ===
In 2007–08, Yebda appeared regularly for Le Mans, helping the team achieve a comfortable ninth place in the league. On 29 May 2008, he signed a four-year contract with S.L. Benfica on a free transfer. A constant midfield fixture, he was voted the Primeira Liga's Player of the Month in September and, in February 2009, he netted his first league goal for the Lisbon club in a 1–1 league draw at FC Porto.

Yebda made a move to Premier League side Portsmouth on 1 September 2009, on a season-long loan. He scored his first goal on 3 October, against Wolverhampton Wanderers at Molineux Stadium, which was the winner in their first victory of the campaign; his second came in a 2–1 away win against Burnley on 27 February 2010, with Pompey being eventually relegated. That season Portsmouth also reached the FA Cup final although Yebda himself did not play in the final due to injury.

On 27 August 2010, Yebda was again loaned, joining S.S.C. Napoli in a season-long move. He netted his first goal the following 18 January, in a 2–1 home win against Bologna for the Coppa Italia; on 4 July 2011, the player announced that he would not be returning to the Serie A team.

=== Granada ===
On 22 August 2011, Yebda joined Granada CF in Spain, signing a three-year contract. He made his official debut five days later, coming as a second-half substitute in a 1–0 La Liga home loss against Real Betis.

Yebda's spell in Andalusia was greatly undermined by injury problems.

=== Later years ===
On 15 August 2014, Yebda signed a one-year deal with UAE Arabian Gulf League side Fujairah FC. On 2 July 2016, after one year without a club, the 32-year-old returned to Portugal and joined C.F. Os Belenenses for one season.

== International career ==
Yebda represented France at youth levels, being part of the squad at the victorious 2001 FIFA U-17 World Championship tournament held in Trinidad and Tobago. As a senior, however, he switched allegiances to Algeria, first being picked for a match against Zambia in September 2009, where he did not play; he finally made his debut on 11 October, in a 3–1 win over Rwanda for the 2010 FIFA World Cup qualifiers.

Yebda was summoned for the Algerian squad at the 2010 Africa Cup of Nations, playing (and starting) all the matches for the eventual semi-finalists. In June, he was selected to the FIFA World Cup in South Africa, again playing all the games: during the tournament he partnered Mehdi Lacen (another defensive midfielder) as the national team failed to score a goal, earning one point.

On 27 March 2011, Yebda scored his first goal for Algeria, in a 1–0 win against Morocco for the 2012 Africa Cup of Nations qualifier where he netted in the sixth minute from a penalty kick. He was also selected to the 2014 World Cup by coach Vahid Halilhodžić, and featured 19 minutes in the last group stage match against Russia to help his team hold on to the 1–1 draw and reach the last 16.

== Personal life ==
Yebda was born to a family from the village of Taourirt Adène in the Tizi Ouzou Province in the Kabylie region of Algeria. He understands both Kabyle and Arabic, but does not speak either language fluently.

== Career statistics ==
=== Club ===
Appearances and goals by club, season and competition
Club	Season	League		National cup		League cup		Continental		Total	
Club	Season	Apps	Goals	Apps	Goals	Apps	Goals	Apps	Goals	Apps	Goals
Auxerre B	2001–02	5	0	—		—		—		5	0
Auxerre B	2002–03	14	2	—		—		—		14	2
Auxerre B	2003–04	19	2	—		—		—		19	2
Auxerre B	2004–05	20	2	—		—		—		20	2
Auxerre B	2005–06	11	1	—		—		—		11	1
Auxerre B	Total	69	7	—		—		—		69	7
Auxerre	2004–05	0	0	0	0	0	0	—		0	0
Auxerre	2005–06	0	0	0	0	0	0	—		0	0
Auxerre	Total	0	0	0	0	0	0	—		0	0
Laval (loan)	2005–06	14	1	—		—		—		14	1
Le Mans (loan)	2006–07	1	0	0	0	0	0	—		1	0
Le Mans B (loan)	2006–07	7	5	—		—		—		7	5
Le Mans	2007–08	23	3	2	0	3	1	—		28	4
Benfica	2008–09	25	1	1	1	3	0	5	0	34	2
Benfica	2009–10	0	0	—		—		—		0	0
Benfica	Total	25	1	1	1	3	0	5	0	34	2
Portsmouth (loan)	2009–10	18	2	2	0	3	0	—		23	2
Napoli (loan)	2010–11	29	0	2	1	—		8	0	39	1
Granada	2011–12	14	0	0	0	—		—		14	0
Granada	2012–13	2	0	0	0	—		—		2	0
Granada	2013–14	10	1	2	0	—		—		12	1
Granada	Total	26	1	2	0	—		—		28	1
Udinese (loan)	2013–14	10	0	1	0	—		—		11	0
Fujairah	2014–15	13	1	1	0	—		—		14	1
Belenenses	2016–17	18	0	0	0	3	0	—		21	0
Belenenses	2017–18	25	3	1	0	3	0	—		29	3
Belenenses	Total	43	3	1	0	6	0	—		50	3
Career total		278	24	12	1	15	1	13	0	318	26

=== International ===
Scores and results list Algeria's goal tally first, score column indicates score after each Yebda goal.

List of international goals scored by Hassan Yebda
No.	Date	Venue	Opponent	Score	Result	Competition
1	27 March 2011	19 Mai 1956, Annaba, Algeria	Morocco	1–0	1–0	2012 Africa Cup of Nations qualification
2	9 October 2011	5 Juillet 1962, Algiers, Algeria	Central African Republic	1–0	2–0	2012 Africa Cup of Nations qualification

== Honours ==
Benfica

- Taça da Liga: 2008–09

Portsmouth

- FA Cup runner-up: 2009–10

France U 17

- FIFA U-17 World Cup: 2001

Individual

- SJPF Player of the Month: September 2008
