= 2009–10 Taça da Liga =

Tournament details
- Host country: Portugal
- Dates: 1 August 2009 – 21 March 2010
- Teams: 32

Final positions
- Champions: Benfica (2nd title)
- Runners-up: Porto

Tournament statistics
- Matches played: 55
- Goals scored: 104 (1.89 per match)
- Top scorer: Carlão (3)

The 2009–10 Taça da Liga was the third edition of the Taça da Liga, also known as Carlsberg Cup for sponsorship reasons. The first matches were played on 1 August 2009. The final was played on 21 March 2010, with Benfica defeating Porto 3–0 to win their second Taça da Liga. The final was played at the Estádio Algarve, Faro.

== Format ==
The 2009–10 Taça de Liga began with a two-legged round between teams from Liga de Honra, the second level of Portuguese football. Winners join the clubs classified 7th–14th from the previous season's Primeira Liga (first level) plus two promoted to the 2009–10 Primeira Liga. There were six groups of three teams each, and every team play two games (once home and once away). Winners of the groups joined the top six teams from the previous season's Primeira Liga in three groups of four teams, each team playing three matches. Winners of the groups and the best second-placed team competed in the one-legged semifinals, with the winners advancing to the final.

== Participating clubs ==
This is a list of clubs participating in the 2009–10 Portuguese League Cup:

- Clubs starting from the First Round: Gil Vicente, Beira-Mar, Estoril, Desportivo das Aves, Varzim, Santa Clara, Portimonense, Freamunde, Feirense, Oliveirense, Covilhã, Trofense, Fátima, Chaves, Carregado, Penafiel
- Clubs starting from the Second Round: Belenenses, Naval, Académica, Paços de Ferreira, Rio Ave, União de Leiria, Olhanense, Vitória de Guimarães, Vitória de Setúbal, Marítimo
- Clubs starting from the Third Round: Porto, Sporting CP, Benfica, Nacional, Leixões, Braga

Boavista was first included in the draw, but the club was excluded from professional competitions on 13 July 2009 due to financial debts. Boavista was scheduled to play against Sporting da Covilhã. On the following day, Penafiel and Carregado were invited to the professional leagues and, after both accepting, they officially joined the league on July 28.

== First round ==
The matches will be played on August 1 and 2 (first legs) and August 8 and 9, 2009 (second legs).

Team 1	Agg.	Team 2	1st leg	2nd leg
Carregado	1–2	Covilhã	0–1	1–1
Desportivo das Aves	1–2	Estoril	1–1	0–1
Beira-Mar	5–4	Freamunde	5–1	0–3
Oliveirense	0–1	Gil Vicente	0–1	0–0
Fátima	2–1	Varzim	2–0	0–1
Chaves	3–3 (2–4 p)	Santa Clara	1–0	2–3
Portimonense	1–1 (6–5 p)	Feirense	1–1	0–0
Penafiel	2–2 (2–3 p)	Trofense	2–0	0–2

== Second round ==
=== Group A ===
Pos	Team	Pld	W	D	L	GF	GA	GD	Pts	Qualification	ACA	POR	BEI
1	Académica (Note: The rules state that the team with the lowest age average of players used in the second round advances to the third round.)	2	0	2	0	0	0	0	2	Advance to third round			0–0
2	Portimonense (II)	2	0	2	0	0	0	0	2		0–0		
3	Beira-Mar (II)	2	0	2	0	0	0	0	2			0–0	

=== Group B ===
Pos	Team	Pld	W	D	L	GF	GA	GD	Pts	Qualification	VTG	COV	VTS
1	Vitória de Guimarães	2	2	0	0	4	1	+3	6	Advance to third round		2–0	
2	Sporting da Covilhã (II)	2	1	0	1	2	2	0	3				2–0
3	Vitória de Setúbal	2	0	0	2	1	4	−3	0		1–2		

=== Group C ===
Pos	Team	Pld	W	D	L	GF	GA	GD	Pts	Qualification	TRO	FAT	MAR
1	Trofense (II)	2	1	1	0	4	2	+2	4	Advance to third round		3–1	
2	Fátima (II)	2	1	0	1	3	4	−1	3				2–1
3	Marítimo	2	0	1	1	2	4	−2	1		1–1		

=== Group D ===
Pos	Team	Pld	W	D	L	GF	GA	GD	Pts	Qualification	EST	PFE	OLH
1	Estoril (II)	2	1	1	0	2	0	+2	4	Advance to third round			2–0
2	Paços de Ferreira	2	1	1	0	1	0	+1	4		0–0		
3	Olhanense	2	0	0	2	0	4	−4	0			0–1	

=== Group E ===
Pos	Team	Pld	W	D	L	GF	GA	GD	Pts	Qualification	RIO	GVI	BEL
1	Rio Ave	2	1	1	0	1	0	+1	4	Advance to third round			1–0
2	Gil Vicente (II)	2	0	2	0	1	1	0	2		0–0		
3	Belenenses	2	0	1	1	1	2	−1	1			1–1	

=== Group F ===
Pos	Team	Pld	W	D	L	GF	GA	GD	Pts	Qualification	LEI	NAV	SCL
1	Leiria	2	1	1	0	3	2	+1	4	Advance to third round		1–1	
2	Naval	2	0	2	0	2	2	0	2				1–1
3	Santa Clara (II)	2	0	1	1	2	3	−1	1		1–2		

== Third round ==
=== Group A ===
Pos	Team	Pld	W	D	L	GF	GA	GD	Pts	Qualification
1	Porto	3	2	1	0	3	0	+3	7	Advance to knockout phase
2	Académica	3	2	1	0	3	1	+2	7	Advance to knockout phase
3	Leixões	3	0	1	2	1	3	−2	1	
4	Estoril	3	0	1	2	2	5	−3	1	

Académica qualified as best runner-up of all groups.

All times: UTC+0

5 January 2010
19:45

Porto	1–0	Leixões
Varela 45+2'	Report

Estádio do Dragão, Porto
Referee: Vasco Santos
3 January 2010
17:00

Académica	2–1	Estoril
Eder 11'; Lito 41'	Report	Antchouet 68'

Estádio Cidade de Coimbra, Coimbra
Attendance: 829
Referee: João Capela

13 January 2010
16:00

Académica	0–0	Porto
	Report

Estádio Cidade de Coimbra, Coimbra
Attendance: 1,607
Referee: João Ferreira
13 January 2010
16:00

Estoril	1–1	Leixões
Erick 59'	Report	Cintra 9'

Estádio António Coimbra da Mota, Estoril
Attendance: 345
Referee: André Gralha

23 January 2010
16:00

Leixões	0–1	Académica
	Report	Sougou 63' (pen.)

Estádio do Mar, Matosinhos
Attendance: 1,192
Referee: Olegário Benquerença
23 January 2010
16:00

Estoril	0–2	Porto
	Report	Belluschi 54'; Sá 78'

Estádio António Coimbra da Mota, Estoril
Attendance: 3,834
Referee: João Capela

=== Group B ===
Pos	Team	Pld	W	D	L	GF	GA	GD	Pts	Qualification
1	Sporting CP	3	3	0	0	5	2	+3	9	Advance to knockout phase
2	Trofense	3	1	1	1	2	2	0	4	
3	Braga	3	1	0	2	5	4	+1	3	
4	União de Leiria	3	0	1	2	3	7	−4	1	

All times: UTC+0

3 January 2010
21:15

Sporting CP	2–1	Braga
Saleiro 36'; Veloso 65'	Report	Alan 50'

Estádio José Alvalade, Lisbon
Referee: Jorge Sousa
3 January 2010
17:00

União de Leiria	1–1	Trofense
Tiago Luís 81'	Report	Silas 3'

Estádio Dr. Magalhães Pessoa, Leiria
Attendance: 527
Referee: Jorge Tavares

13 January 2010
16:00

União de Leiria	1–2	Sporting CP
Carlão 70'	Report	Pereira 16'; Veloso 36'

Estádio Dr. Magalhães Pessoa, Leiria
Referee: Artur Soares Dias
13 January 2010
16:00

Trofense	1–0	Braga
Mércio 38'	Report

Estádio do Clube Desportivo Trofense, Trofa
Attendance: 857
Referee: Bruno Paixão

23 January 2010
16:00

Braga	4–1	União de Leiria
Bastos 22'; Peña 38'; Matheus 42'; Paulão 68'	Report	Cássio 9'

Estádio AXA, Braga
Attendance: 2,391
Referee: Bruno Esteves
23 January 2010
16:00

Trofense	0–1	Sporting CP
	Report	Liédson 36'

Estádio do Clube Desportivo Trofense, Trofa
Attendance: 4915
Referee: Paulo Costa

=== Group C ===
Pos	Team	Pld	W	D	L	GF	GA	GD	Pts	Qualification
1	Benfica	3	2	1	0	4	2	+2	7	Advance to knockout phase
2	Rio Ave	3	1	1	1	4	4	0	4	
3	Nacional	3	1	1	1	2	2	0	4	
4	Vitória de Guimarães	3	0	1	2	2	4	−2	1	

All times: UTC+0

3 January 2010
19:15

Benfica	1–0	Nacional
Saviola 79'

Estádio da Luz, Lisbon
Attendance: 36,521
Referee: Olegário Benquerença
3 January 2010
17:00

Vitória de Guimarães	1–2	Rio Ave
Moreno 30'		Wesllem 72'; Tomás 77'

Estádio D. Afonso Henriques, Guimarães
Attendance: 6,842
Referee: João Ferreira

13 January 2010
16:00

Vitória de Guimarães	1–1	Benfica
Douglas 59'		Coentrão 75'

Estádio D. Afonso Henriques, Guimarães
Referee: Carlos Xistra
13 January 2010
16:00

Rio Ave	1–1	Nacional
Costa 15'		Tomás 20'

Estádio dos Arcos, Vila do Conde
Referee: Duarte Gomes

23 January 2010
16:00

Nacional	1–0	Vitória de Guimarães
Juliano 54'

Estádio da Madeira, Funchal
23 January 2010
16:00

Rio Ave	1–2	Benfica
Gama 54' (pen.)		Di María 49'; Martins 76'

Estádio dos Arcos, Vila do Conde

== Knockout phase ==
Semifinals
Sporting CP	1
Benfica	4
Porto	1
Académica	0

Final
Benfica	3
Porto	0

=== Semi-finals ===
9 February 2010
20:15 UTC

Sporting CP	1–4	Benfica
Liédson 37'	Report	David Luiz 8'; Ramires 29'; Luisão 68'; Cardozo 90+4'

Estádio José Alvalade, Lisbon
Attendance: 20,000
Referee: Olegário Benquerença

10 February 2010
20:15 UTC

Porto	1–0	Académica
González 81'	Report

Estádio do Dragão, Porto
Attendance: 22,000
Referee: Pedro Proença

=== Final ===
21 March 2010
19:15 BST

Benfica	3–0	Porto
Amorim 10'; Martins 45'; Cardozo 90+2'	Report

Estádio Algarve, Faro
Attendance: 23,430
Referee: Jorge Sousa

Benfica	Porto

Benfica:
GK	12	(Portugal) Quim
RB	14	(Uruguay) Maxi Pereira	(yellow card) 39'
CB	4	(Brazil) Luisão (c)
CB	23	(Brazil) David Luiz
LB	18	(Portugal) Fábio Coentrão	(yellow card) 86'
DM	2	(Brazil) Airton
LM	5	(Portugal) Ruben Amorim
AM	17	(Portugal) Carlos Martins		(substituted off) 67'
RM	20	(Argentina) Ángel Di María
CF	10	(Argentina) Pablo Aimar	(yellow card) 45'	(substituted off) 62'
CF	31	(Brazil) Alan Kardec		(substituted off) 77'
Substitutes:
GK	1	(Portugal) José Moreira
DF	27	(Brazil) Sidnei
MF	6	(Spain) Javi García
MF	8	(Brazil) Ramires	(yellow card) 89'	(substituted on) 67'
FW	21	(Portugal) Nuno Gomes
FW	30	(Argentina) Javier Saviola		(substituted on) 62'
FW	7	(Paraguay) Óscar Cardozo		(substituted on) 77'
Manager:
(Portugal) Jorge Jesus

Porto:
GK	33	(Portugal) Nuno
RB	22	(Portugal) Miguel Lopes	(yellow card) 11'	(substituted off) 45'
CB	14	(Portugal) Rolando
CB	2	(Portugal) Bruno Alves (c)	(yellow card) 45'
LB	15	(Uruguay) Álvaro Pereira
DM	25	(Brazil) Fernando
CM	28	(Portugal) Rúben Micael		(substituted off) 45'
CM	3	(Portugal) Raul Meireles
RW	7	(Argentina) Fernando Belluschi	(yellow card) 37'	(substituted off) 71'
LW	10	(Uruguay) Cristian Rodríguez
CF	9	(Colombia) Radamel Falcao
Substitutes:
GK	24	(Portugal) Beto
DF	13	(Uruguay) Jorge Fucile	(yellow card) 52'	(substituted on) 46'
DF	16	(Brazil) Maicon
MF	6	(Colombia) Fredy Guarín
MF	20	(Argentina) Tomás Costa
MF	8	(Argentina) Diego Valeri		(substituted on) 46'
FW	29	(Portugal) Orlando Sá		(substituted on) 71'
Manager:
(Portugal) Jesualdo Ferreira

2009–10 Taça da Liga winners

2nd title
