= William (footballer, born 1982) =

Brazilian footballer

Personal information
- Full name: William Arthur Conceição dos Santos
- Date of birth: July 27, 1982 (age 44)
- Place of birth: Rio de Janeiro, Brazil
- Height: 1.85 m (6 ft 1 in)
- Position: Striker

Team information
- Current team: Macaé
- Number: 10

Youth career
- 1998–2000: Madureira

Senior career*
Years	Team	Apps	(Gls)
2001	Juventus-SP	19	(11)
2002–2005	Olaria	44	(14)
2006–2007	Portuguesa da Ilha	20	(8)
2007	Cabofriense	12	(1)
2007	América de Natal	16	(5)
2008–2010	Paços de Ferreira	33	(19)
2010–2012	Vitória de Guimarães	3	(0)
2011	→ Vitória de Setúbal (loan)	9	(2)
2011–2012	→ Paços de Ferreira (loan)	10	(1)
2012	Olaria	6	(0)
2012	Portimonense	9	(0)
2013	Duque de Caxias		
2014	Ipatinga		
2016	Itaboraí	5	(2)
2017	Olaria		
2018–	Macaé		
- * Club domestic league appearances and goals as of 2 December 2012

William Arthur Conceição dos Santos (born July 27, 1982 in Rio de Janeiro) is a Brazilian footballer who plays as a striker for Brazilian club Macaé.
