= Bruno Pereirinha =

Portuguese footballer (born 1988)

Personal information
- Full name: Bruno Alexandre Marques Pereirinha
- Date of birth: 2 March 1988 (age 38)
- Place of birth: Rio de Mouro, Portugal
- Height: 1.74 m (5 ft 9 in)
- Position: Midfielder

Youth career
- 1995–2003: Belenenses
- 2003–2006: Sporting CP

Senior career*
Years	Team	Apps	(Gls)
2006–2013	Sporting CP	86	(2)
2006	→ Olivais Moscavide (loan)	9	(0)
2010	→ Vitória Guimarães (loan)	10	(1)
2011	→ Kavala (loan)	13	(0)
2012–2013	Sporting CP B	3	(0)
2013–2015	Lazio	22	(0)
2015–2017	Athletico Paranaense	7	(1)
2017–2018	Belenenses	16	(0)
2018–2019	Cova Piedade	15	(0)
Total		181	(4)

International career
2006–2007	Portugal U19	16	(0)
2007	Portugal U20	7	(1)
2007–2010	Portugal U21	23	(0)
- * Club domestic league appearances and goals

Bruno Alexandre Marques Pereirinha (born 2 March 1988) is a Portuguese former footballer. He played mainly as a right midfielder, also being able to operate as an attacking right-back.

He spent most of his professional career with Sporting CP, appearing in 145 official matches over five seasons (six goals scored) and winning three major titles, including two Taça de Portugal. Abroad, he had spells at Lazio in Italy and Athletico Paranaense of Brazil.

All youth levels comprised, Pereirinha won 53 caps for Portugal, including 23 for the under-21s.

== Club career ==
=== Sporting CP ===
Born in Rio de Mouro, Lisbon District, Pereirinha made his professional debut for Sporting CP in 2006–07, having started that same season on loan at Segunda Liga team C.D. Olivais e Moscavide, as Miguel Veloso before him. His first appearance for the main squad came on 13 January 2007, playing 18 minutes of a 0–0 away draw with C.F. Os Belenenses, the club where he spent most of his youth career.

On 13 March 2008, in the campaign's UEFA Cup round-of-16 second leg against Bolton Wanderers, Pereirinha scored an 85th-minute goal that gave Sporting a 1–0 home win and a spot in the quarter-finals. He had also netted in the previous round, in the 3–0 away victory over FC Basel.

Pereirinha continued to be regularly used in the following years, but almost exclusively from the bench. On 21 March 2009, in a rare start, he opened the score against Lisbon neighbours S.L. Benfica in the final of the Taça da Liga, but the Lions eventually lost on penalties after 1–1 in regulation time.

On 22 June 2010, being deemed surplus to requirements at Sporting, the 22-year-old Pereirinha was loaned to fellow Primeira Liga side Vitória de Guimarães, initially in a season-long move. In early January 2011, however, he joined Kavala F.C. of the Super League Greece also on loan.

=== Lazio ===
In 2012–13, Pereirinha was completely ostracised by all four Sporting managers – as several other Portuguese players – also being demoted to the B team in division two and dealing with a right knee injury. Subsequently, he cut ties with the club and signed shortly after with SS Lazio in Italy for three and a half years.

Pereirinha left the Romans on 15 July 2015, after buying out his contract.

=== Atlético Paranaense ===
On 15 July 2015, Pereirinha signed a two-year deal with Club Athletico Paranaense. He made his debut ten days later, as a 76th-minute substitute for Eduardo in a 2–1 Série A win at Avaí FC. On 15 October, after only one minute on the pitch, he scored his first goal for his new team to put them back ahead in an eventual 2–2 draw against Cruzeiro Esporte Clube at the Arena da Baixada.

=== Return to Portugal ===
In July 2017, Pereirinha returned to his country's top flight with a one-year contract at C.F. Os Belenenses, managed by Domingos Paciência, his last boss at Sporting. He played about half of their league games, split equally as a starter and substitute, and was sent off in the first half of the last one, a 1–0 loss at Boavista FC.

Having started the 2018–19 season without a club, Pereirinha was signed in September by C.D. Cova da Piedade of the second tier.

== International career ==
In 2007, aged 19, Pereirinha broke into the Portugal under-21 side, also representing the nation in the 2007 FIFA U-20 World Cup held in Canada. On 25 March 2009 he, alongside teammate Rui Pedro, was suspended by under-21 coach Carlos Queiroz after both attempted an unsuccessful backpass penalty during a match against Cape Verde in the Madeira International Tournament (the score was then at 2–0 for the hosts).

== Personal life ==
Pererinha's father, Joaquim, was also a footballer. A defender, he represented, among others, Benfica and S.C. Farense.

== Career statistics ==
As of 31 August 2015

Club	Season	League			Cup		Continental		Total	
Club	Season	Division	Apps	Goals	Apps	Goals	Apps	Goals	Apps	Goals
Sporting CP	2005–06	Primeira Liga	0	0	0	0	0	0	0	0
Sporting CP	2006–07	Primeira Liga	11	1	4	0	—		15	1
Sporting CP	2007–08	Primeira Liga	22	0	6	0	9 (Note: Appearances in UEFA Europa League and UEFA Champions League)	2	37	2
Sporting CP	2008–09	Primeira Liga	25	1	4	1	8	0	39	2
Sporting CP	2009–10	Primeira Liga	17	0	5	1	7	0	29	1
Sporting CP	2011–12	Primeira Liga	11	0	6	0	10 (Note: Appearances in UEFA Europa League)	0	27	0
Sporting CP	2012–13	Primeira Liga	0	0	0	0	0	0	0	0
Sporting CP	Total		86	2	25	2	34	2	145	6
Olivais Moscavide (loan)	2006–07	Segunda Liga	9	0	1	0	—		10	0
Vitória Guimarães (loan)	2010–11	Primeira Liga	10	1	1	0	—		11	1
Kavala (loan)	2010–11	Super League Greece	13	0	0	0	—		13	0
Lazio	2012–13	Serie A	8	0	0	0	3	0	11	0
Lazio	2013–14	Serie A	11	0	0	0	—		11	0
Lazio	2014–15	Serie A	3	0	2	0	—		5	0
Lazio	Total		22	0	2	0	3	0	27	0
Athletico Paranaense	2015	Série A	2	0	0	0	0	0	2	0
Career total			142	3	29	0	37	2	208	5

== Honours ==
Sporting CP

- Taça de Portugal: 2006–07, 2007–08
- Supertaça Cândido de Oliveira: 2008
- Taça da Liga runner-up: 2007–08, 2008–09

Lazio

- Coppa Italia runner-up: 2014–15

Athletico Paranaense

- Campeonato Paranaense: 2016
