= Ferreira (footballer, born 1983) =

Brazilian footballer

Personal information
- Full name: Antonieliton Ferreira de Arruda
- Date of birth: 10 August 1983 (age 43)
- Place of birth: Campina Grande, Brazil
- Height: 1.74 m (5 ft 9 in)
- Position: Right back

Team information
- Current team: Sport Lagoa Seca

Youth career
- Corinthians-AL

Senior career*
Years	Team	Apps	(Gls)
2001–2004	Porto B	64	(3)
2003–2004	→ Gil Vicente (loan)	30	(1)
2004–2006	Marítimo B	26	(3)
2004–2006	Marítimo	16	(1)
2007	São Bento		
2007–2009	Paços Ferreira	39	(2)
2010–2011	Treze	11	(4)
2012	América-RN	0	(0)
2012	Campinense	5	(0)
2012	Moto Club		
2013–2014	Botafogo-PB	31	(2)
2015	Central	15	(1)
2015–2016	Portimonense	15	(1)
2017	Treze	0	(0)
2017	Sergipe	4	(0)
2018	Treze	0	(0)
2019	Serrano-PB	6	(0)
2019–	Sport Lagoa Seca		
- * Club domestic league appearances and goals as of 9 June 2019

Antonieliton Ferreira de Arruda (born 10 August 1983 in Campina Grande, Paraíba), known as Ferreira, is a Brazilian professional footballer who plays for Sport Lagoa Seca as a right back.
