= Morten Pedersen =

Norwegian footballer (born 1972)

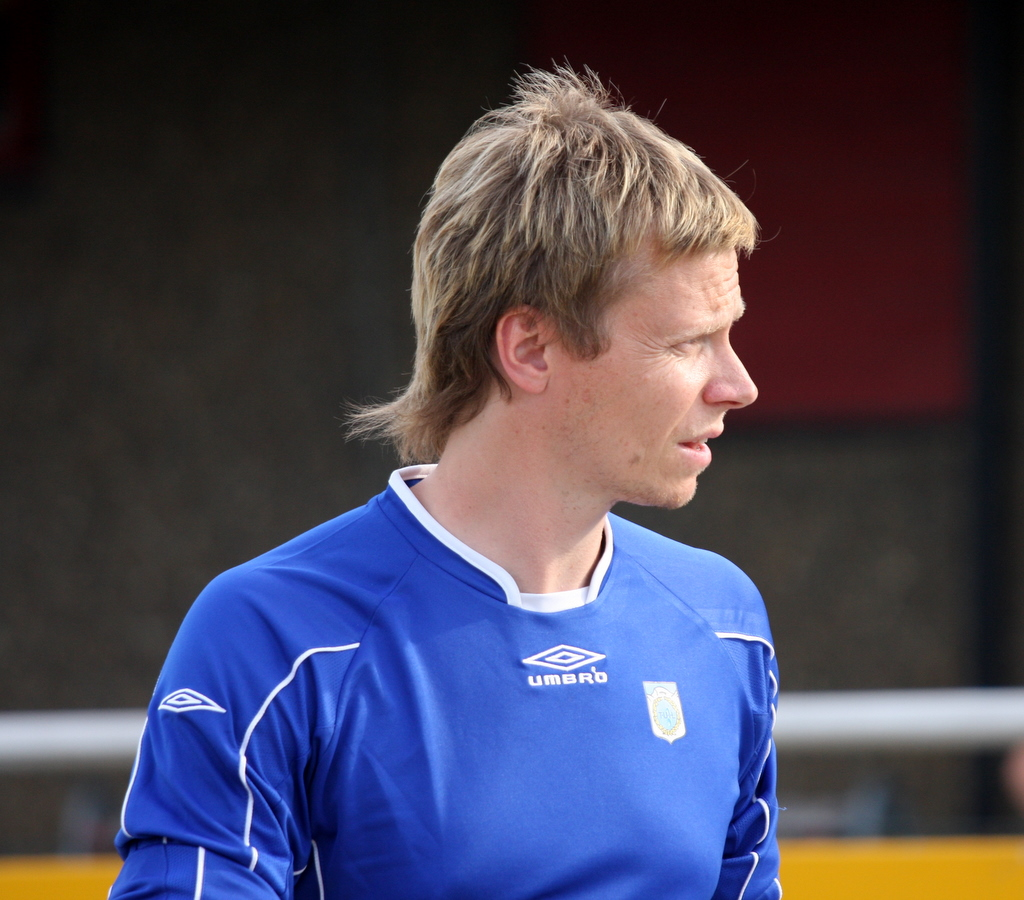
- Morten Pedersen at Bryne Stadion in June 2009

Personal information
- Date of birth: 12 April 1972 (age 54)
- Place of birth: Tromsø, Norway
- Height: 1.86 m (6 ft 1 in)
- Position: Defender

Youth career
- Storsteinnes IL

Senior career*
Years	Team	Apps	(Gls)
1990–1992	Brøndby IF	1	
1992–1995	Tromsø		
1996–1997	Brann	36	(0)
1997–1998	Borussia Mönchengladbach	5	(0)
1998	Rosenborg	2	(0)
1999	→ Vålerenga (loan)	9	(0)
1999–2003	Gent	27	(1)
2003–2007	Tromsø	82	(1)

Managerial career
- 2009–2010: Tromsdalen
- * Club domestic league appearances and goals

Morten Pedersen (born 12 April 1972) is a Norwegian former footballer who played as defender. He is the head coach of Tromsø under 21 side.

== Career ==
Pedersen started his career playing for Storsteinnes IL, before going to the Danish club Brøndby IF in 1990. His stint at Brøndby was not successful, and he only got to play one match during the two years he stayed at the club. In 1992, he returned to Norway to play for Tromsø. Pedersen stayed with Tromsø until 1996, when he transferred to Brann. Pedersen only spent one year, playing regularly for Brann, before trying his luck abroad for a second time, this time with German Bundesliga club Borussia Mönchengladbach. His career in Germany proved to be as unsuccessful as his career in Denmark, however, and he returned to Norway one year later to play with Rosenborg, where he won the Tippeligaen. After a year at Rosenborg, he made a third and final attempt at establishing a career as a foreign professional, going to Belgian side Gent. At Gent, which at that moment was coached by a fellow Norwegian, Trond Sollied, Pedersen finally got regular playing time, and his time at the club proved very successful. Pedersen played with Gent for some seasons before returning to Tromsø in 2003, the same year that Ole Martin Årst also returned to Tromsø from Belgium. Pedersen was during his playing career heavily linked to both Liverpool and Newcastle United.

Pedersen also played for Vålerenga for a while, on a loan.

Before retiring in 2007, Pedersen played for Tromsø, where he returned in 2003 after having played for various professional Norwegian and foreign clubs. During Tromsø's last home match of the 2006 season, Pedersen sustained an injury which would eventually lead him to retire from football. He officially announced that he retired in August 2007, and was honored during a special ceremony before the home match against Odd Grenland on 2 September 2007.

From 2009 through 2010 he was the head coach of Tromsdalen UIL.
