= Luís Dias (footballer, born 1987) =

Portuguese footballer

Personal information
- Full name: Luís Manuel Braga Dias
- Date of birth: 3 January 1987 (age 39)
- Place of birth: Penafiel, Portugal
- Height: 1.80 m (5 ft 11 in)
- Position: Right-back

Youth career
- 1994–2006: Penafiel

Senior career*
Years	Team	Apps	(Gls)
2006–2012	Penafiel	143	(3)
2012–2014	Arouca	18	(0)
2014–2015	Santa Clara	20	(0)
2015–2019	Penafiel	44	(0)
2019–2021	Lusitânia	1	(0)
Total		226	(3)

International career
2007	Portugal U20	1	(0)
- * Club domestic league appearances and goals

Luís Manuel Braga Dias (born 3 January 1987 in Penafiel, Porto District) is a Portuguese former professional footballer who played as a right-back.
