= Carlos Martins (footballer) =

Portuguese footballer (born 1982)

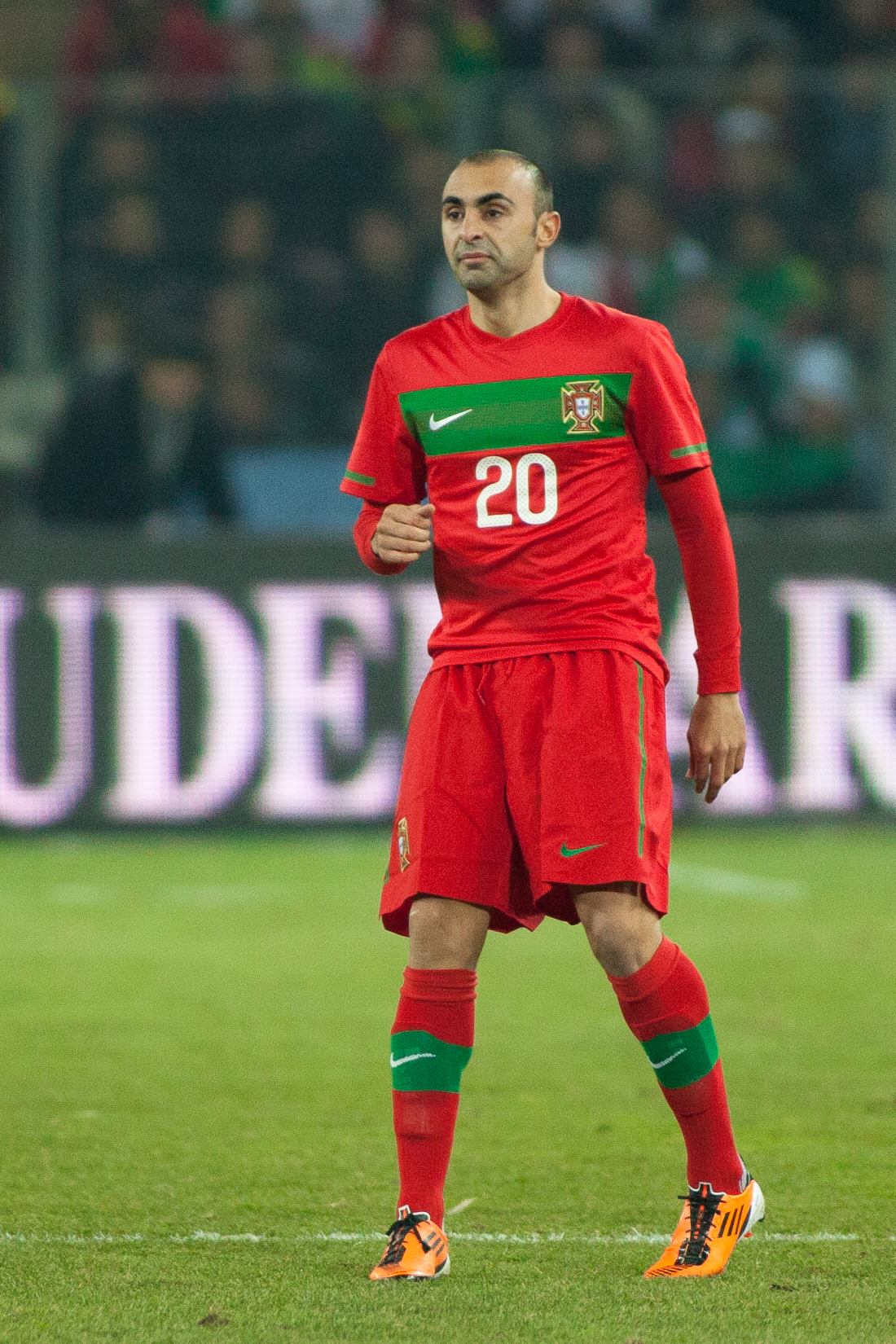
- Martins with Portugal in 2011

Personal information
- Full name: Carlos Jorge Neto Martins
- Date of birth: 29 April 1982 (age 44)
- Place of birth: Oliveira do Hospital, Portugal
- Height: 1.72 m (5 ft 8 in)
- Position: Attacking midfielder

Youth career
- 1990–1993: Tourizense
- 1993–2000: Sporting CP

Senior career*
Years	Team	Apps	(Gls)
2000–2003	Sporting CP B	29	(3)
2000–2007	Sporting CP	76	(9)
2001–2002	→ Campomaiorense (loan)	27	(1)
2003	→ Académica (loan)	9	(0)
2007–2008	Recreativo	32	(6)
2008–2014	Benfica	79	(6)
2011–2012	→ Granada (loan)	29	(3)
2014	Benfica B	9	(0)
2015–2016	Belenenses	38	(3)
Total		328	(31)

International career
2001–2002	Portugal U20	12	(1)
2002–2004	Portugal U21	14	(7)
2004–2005	Portugal B	3	(0)
2004	Portugal Olympic	4	(1)
2006–2013	Portugal	17	(2)
Medal record
Men's football
Representing Portugal
UEFA European Under-21 Championship
Third place	2004 Germany
- * Club domestic league appearances and goals

Carlos Jorge Neto Martins (born 29 April 1982) is a Portuguese former professional footballer. An attacking midfielder, he was noted for his long-range shots.

His career, during which he represented both Sporting CP and Benfica, was marred by injury and discipline problems. He also played professionally in Spain, with Recreativo and Granada, and amassed Primeira Liga totals of 201 matches and 18 goals over 12 seasons.

A member of Portugal's team at the 2004 Olympics, Martins earned 17 senior caps for his nation.

== Club career ==
=== Sporting CP ===
Born in Oliveira do Hospital, Coimbra District, Martins was a youth product of Sporting CP, joining its system at the age of 11. He made his professional debut with modest S.C. Campomaiorense in the Segunda Liga and, from January–June 2003, was again loaned, to Primeira Liga side Académica de Coimbra.

In the 2005–06 season, despite suffering from several physical problems as well as disciplinary issues, Martins was still able to score two goals in only 13 starts.

=== Recreativo ===
However, in February 2007, after several bouts of indiscipline at Sporting, coach Paulo Bento ostracised Martins for the final three months of the campaign, and although a player still under contract, moving abroad was the only option available for him and, in June, he transferred to La Liga club Recreativo de Huelva.

In November, Portuguese network RTP Internacional interviewed Martins about his situation at Sporting and the player responded: "My situation with coach Bento has been a very bad one. I was constantly pressured to perform and when I did eventually get the call-up to the national side, it got so far that it almost turned into a physical confrontation". Bento denied this despite media sources releasing information of the two that went back to the manager's playing career at Sporting.

Martins finished the season with seven goals in 35 competitive appearances, his only in the Copa del Rey coming in a 1–1 home draw against Xerez CD in the round of 32.

=== Benfica ===
On 1 July 2008, Martins signed a five-year deal with S.L. Benfica, with the club paying €3 million for the transfer (40% to Recreativo, 40% to Sporting and 20% to the player). Regularly used during his first year although never an undisputed starter, he netted his first goal for the side in a 2–0 win at Vitória de Guimarães in the Taça da Liga. Also in that competition, he scored the decider in the penalty shootout final victory over former side Sporting on 21 March 2009.

Martins lost some room early into the following season, mainly due to recurrent injuries; however, he bounced back and figured prominently for Jorge Jesus' side. On 21 March 2010, exactly 365 days after the last final, he helped them renew their League Cup supremacy as he netted in a 3–0 defeat of FC Porto from a 30-meter free kick.

On 13 August 2011, Benfica loaned Martins to Granada CF – recently promoted to the Spanish top division – in a season-long move. He appeared regularly as a starter during his spell but, although the Andalusians attempted to renew his loan deal, the Portuguese rejected, only allowing the player to leave on a permanent basis.

After a successful 2012 preseason, where he scored several goals, Martins renewed his contract in August until 2016. Featuring sporadically throughout the campaign, he did take the field as a substitute in a match against G.D. Estoril-Praia on 6 May 2013: with the game tied 1–1 and Benfica looking to score, he was booked in the 70th minute and, eight minutes later, was sent off after another foul in an eventual home draw that saw his team lose the title race to Porto. He was subsequently told to look for a new club after manager Jesus deemed him surplus to requirements but, being unable to do so, he spent the entire 2013–14 with the reserves in the second tier, only appearing after the winter transfer window.

=== Belenenses ===
On 16 September 2014, Martins terminated his contract with Benfica. The following month, he signed for one year with fellow top-tier C.F. Os Belenenses, making his official debut on 7 January 2015 by starting in a 7–1 away loss against S.C. Braga in the quarter-finals of the Taça de Portugal.

Martins scored a brace to help his team to defeat IFK Göteborg 2–1 at the Estádio do Restelo on 30 July 2015, in the first leg of the third qualifying round of the UEFA Europa League.

== International career ==
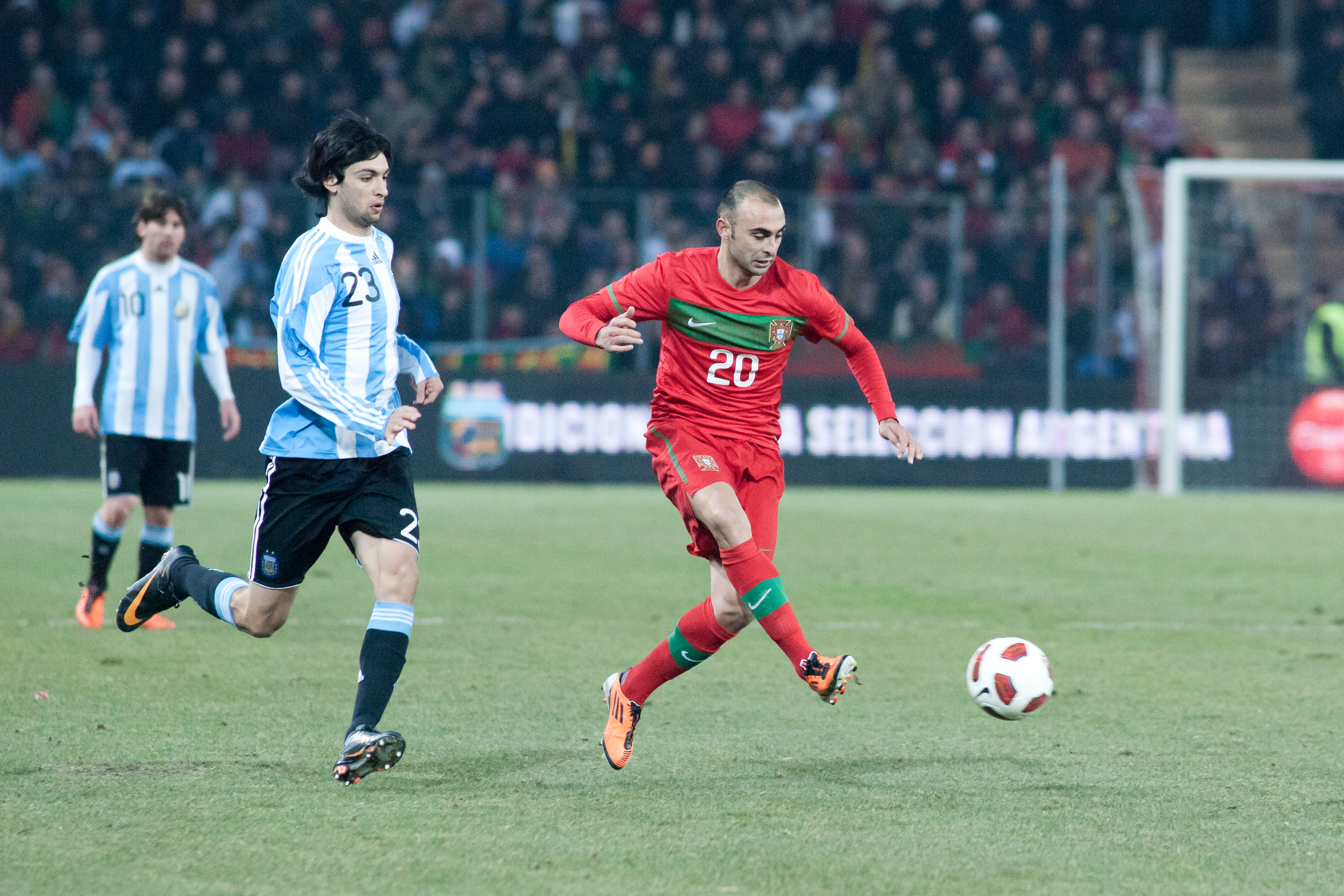
Martins (right) playing for Portugal against Argentina in 2011

After Portugal finished in fourth place at the 2006 FIFA World Cup Martins, a former under-21 international, was called to the senior squad for the first time for a friendly with Denmark and a UEFA Euro 2008 qualifier against Finland in September. He made his debut in the former fixture, on the first day of the month.

Appearing rarely the following four years, Martins received a surprise callup in September 2010 for Euro 2012 qualifying campaign matches against Denmark and Iceland, as former Sporting coach Bento was in charge of the national team: he started in both games, consecutive 3–1 wins.

Martins missed the final stages in Poland and Ukraine after featuring regularly in the qualifiers, having contracted an injury in late May 2012 already in training camp. Previously, he was part of the squad at the 2004 Summer Olympics, a group-stage exit in Athens.

== Personal life ==
On 15 November 2011, during Portugal's Euro 2012 playoff home fixture against Bosnia and Herzegovina, it was announced that Martins' three-year-old son Gustavo suffered from a rare bone marrow condition, needing an urgent transplant. The player spent nearly two weeks in his country, returning to action for Granada (as a starter) in a home game against RCD Mallorca on the 20th, scoring the 1–1 equaliser and being booked shortly afterwards for a reckless challenge, with the game being eventually suspended minutes later after a 15-year-old spectator hit the assistant referee with an umbrella.

Martins' younger brother, João, was also a footballer and a midfielder. He also graduated from Sporting's youth academy, but spent most of his career in the lower leagues.

== Career statistics ==
=== Club ===
Appearances and goals by club, season and competition
Club	Season	League			National cup		League cup		Europe		Other (Note: Includes Supertaça Cândido de Oliveira)		Total	
Club	Season	Division	Apps	Goals	Apps	Goals	Apps	Goals	Apps	Goals	Apps	Goals	Apps	Goals
Sporting CP B	2000–01	Segunda Divisão B	24	2	—		—		—		—		24	2
Sporting CP B	2001–02	Segunda Divisão B	0	0	—		—		—		—		0	0
Sporting CP B	2002–03	Segunda Divisão B	5	1	—		—		—		—		5	1
Sporting CP B	Total		29	3	—		—		—		—		29	3
Sporting CP	2000–01	Primeira Liga	1	0	0	0	—		0	0	0	0	1	0
Sporting CP	2002–03	Primeira Liga	6	0	1	1	—		1	0	1	1	9	2
Sporting CP	2003–04	Primeira Liga	14	2	1	0	—		2	0	—		17	2
Sporting CP	2004–05	Primeira Liga	22	5	2	2	—		7	0	—		31	7
Sporting CP	2005–06	Primeira Liga	21	2	3	0	—		0	0	—		24	2
Sporting CP	2006–07	Primeira Liga	12	0	1	0	—		3	0	—		16	0
Sporting CP	Total		76	9	8	3	—		13	0	1	1	98	13
Campomaiorense (loan)	2001–02	Segunda Liga	27	1	2	0	—		—		—		29	1
Académica (loan)	2002–03	Primeira Liga	9	0	2	0	—		—		—		11	0
Recreativo	2007–08	La Liga	32	6	3	1	—		—		—		35	7
Benfica	2008–09	Primeira Liga	24	0	1	0	5	1	5	0	—		35	1
Benfica	2009–10	Primeira Liga	17	3	1	2	4	2	8	0	—		30	7
Benfica	2010–11	Primeira Liga	25	3	4	0	3	0	13	0	1	0	46	3
Benfica	2012–13	Primeira Liga	13	0	2	0	2	0	5	0	—		22	0
Benfica	Total		79	6	8	2	14	3	31	0	1	0	133	11
Granada (loan)	2011–12	La Liga	29	3	0	0	—		—		—		29	3
Benfica B	2013–14	Segunda Liga	9	0	—		—		—		—		9	0
Belenenses	2014–15	Primeira Liga	14	1	1	0	1	0	—		—		16	1
Belenenses	2015–16	Primeira Liga	24	2	0	0	0	0	6	2	—		30	4
Belenenses	Total		38	3	1	0	1	0	6	2	—		46	5
Career total			328	31	24	6	15	3	50	2	2	1	419	43

=== International ===
Scores and results list Portugal's goal tally first, score column indicates score after each Martins goal.

List of international goals scored by Carlos Martins
No.	Date	Venue	Opponent	Score	Result	Competition
1	20 August 2008	Estádio Municipal, Aveiro, Portugal	Faroe Islands	1–0	5–0	Friendly
2	17 November 2010	Estádio da Luz, Lisbon, Portugal	Spain	1–0	4–0	Friendly

== Honours ==
Sporting CP

- Taça de Portugal: 2006–07
- Supertaça Cândido de Oliveira: 2002
- UEFA Cup runner-up: 2004–05

Benfica

- Primeira Liga: 2009–10
- Taça da Liga: 2008–09, 2009–10, 2010–11
- Taça de Portugal runner-up: 2012–13
- Supertaça Cândido de Oliveira runner-up: 2010
- UEFA Europa League runner-up: 2012–13

Portugal

- Toulon Tournament: 2001
