= 2008–09 Taça da Liga =

Tournament details
- Host country: Portugal
- Dates: 2 August 2008 – 21 March 2009
- Teams: 32

Final positions
- Champions: Benfica (1st title)
- Runners-up: Sporting CP

Tournament statistics
- Matches played: 53
- Goals scored: 124 (2.34 per match)
- Top scorer: Liédson (4)

The 2008–09 Taça da Liga was the second edition of the Taça da Liga, also known as Carlsberg Cup due to sponsorship reasons. The first matches were played on 2 August 2008 and the final was held on 21 March 2009 at the Estádio Algarve in Faro. Present for the second time in the final of this competition, Sporting CP were once again defeated 3–2 on penalties, this time by rivals Benfica.

== Format ==
After the first season, a change in the format was approved by the Portuguese League for Professional Football. The Cup began with a two-legged round between teams from Liga de Honra (2nd level). Winners were joined by the clubs classified 7th–14th from last season's Primeira Liga (1st level) plus two promoted to this season's Liga. There were six groups of three clubs each, and every team played two matches (once home and once away). Winners of the groups joined the top-six teams from the last season's Primeira Liga and there were three groups of four teams, each club playing three matches. Winners of the groups and the best second-placed club competed in the one-legged semi-finals, with the winners advancing to the final.

== Participating clubs ==
This is a list of clubs participating in the 2008–09 Portuguese League Cup:

- Clubs starting from the first round: Boavista (excluded), União de Leiria, Vizela, Gil Vicente, Olhanense, Beira-Mar, Estoril, Desportivo das Aves, Varzim, Santa Clara, Portimonense, Gondomar, Freamunde, Feirense, UD Oliveirense, Sporting da Covilhã
- Clubs starting from the second round: Braga, Belenenses, Nacional, Naval, Académica, Estrela da Amadora, Leixões, Paços de Ferreira, Trofense, Rio Ave
- Clubs starting from the third round: Porto, Sporting CP, Vitória de Guimarães, Benfica, Marítimo, Vitória de Setúbal

== First round ==
The matches were played on August 2 (first legs) and August 9 and 10, 2008 (second legs).

Team 1	Agg.	Team 2	1st leg	2nd leg
Feirense	1–2	Vizela	1–2	0–0
Santa Clara	1–2	Olhanense	0–0	1–2
Estoril	2–1	U.D. Oliveirense	1–0	1–1
Varzim	0–1	União de Leiria	0–0	0–1
Sporting da Covilhã	w/o	Boavista	/	/
Freamunde	3–3 (4–2 p)	Desportivo das Aves	3–1	0–2
Portimonense	1–4	Gil Vicente	0–2	1–2
Gondomar	3–3 (5–4 p)	Beira-Mar	3–1	0–2

== Second round ==
The matches were played from August 16 to November 5, 2008.

=== Group A ===
Pos	Team	Pld	W	D	L	GF	GA	GD	Pts	Qualification	RAV	BRA	LEI
1	Rio Ave	2	2	0	0	3	1	+2	6	Advance to third round		1–0	
2	Braga	2	1	0	1	4	1	+3	3				4–0
3	Leixões	2	0	0	2	1	6	−5	0		1–2		

Source: lpfp.pt (in Portuguese)
Rules for classification: 1) points; 2) goal difference; 3) number of goals scored.

=== Group B ===
Pos	Team	Pld	W	D	L	GF	GA	GD	Pts	Qualification	BEL	GVI	SCO
1	Belenenses	2	1	1	0	1	0	+1	4	Advance to third round			0–0
2	Gil Vicente	2	1	0	1	2	2	0	3		0–1		
3	Sporting da Covilhã	2	0	1	1	1	2	−1	1			1–2	

Source: lpfp.pt (in Portuguese)
Rules for classification: 1) points; 2) goal difference; 3) number of goals scored.

=== Group C ===
Pos	Team	Pld	W	D	L	GF	GA	GD	Pts	Qualification	PAÇ	EST	VIZ
1	Paços de Ferreira	2	2	0	0	4	1	+3	6	Advance to third round		2–1	
2	Estrela da Amadora	2	1	0	1	5	3	+2	3				4–1
3	Vizela	2	0	0	2	1	6	−5	0		0–2		

Source: lpfp.pt (in Portuguese)
Rules for classification: 1) points; 2) goal difference; 3) number of goals scored.

=== Group D ===
Pos	Team	Pld	W	D	L	GF	GA	GD	Pts	Qualification	NAC	ULE	TRO
1	Nacional	2	1	0	1	2	1	+1	3	Advance to third round			2–0
2	União de Leiria	2	1	0	1	1	1	0	3		1–0		
3	Trofense	2	1	0	1	1	2	−1	3			1–0	

Source: lpfp.pt (in Portuguese)
Rules for classification: 1) points; 2) goal difference; 3) number of goals scored.

=== Group E ===
Pos	Team	Pld	W	D	L	GF	GA	GD	Pts	Qualification	OLH	ESP	NAV
1	Olhanense	2	1	0	1	3	2	+1	3	Advance to third round			2–0
2	Estoril	2	1	0	1	4	4	0	3		2–1		
3	Naval 1º de Maio	2	1	0	1	3	4	−1	3			3–2	

Source: lpfp.pt (in Portuguese)
Rules for classification: 1) points; 2) goal difference; 3) number of goals scored.

=== Group F ===
Pos	Team	Pld	W	D	L	GF	GA	GD	Pts	Qualification	ACA	GND	FRM
1	Académica	2	1	1	0	3	1	+2	4	Advance to third round			1–1
2	Gondomar	2	1	0	1	1	2	−1	3		0–2		
3	Freamunde	2	0	1	1	1	2	−1	1			0–1	

Source: lpfp.pt (in Portuguese)
Rules for classification: 1) points; 2) goal difference; 3) number of goals scored.

== Third round ==
The matches were played from December 14, 2008 to January 18, 2009.

=== Group A ===
Pos	Team	Pld	W	D	L	GF	GA	GD	Pts	Qualification	POR	NAC	ACA	VSE
1	Porto	3	2	0	1	4	3	+1	6	Advance to knockout phase			1–0	2–1
2	Nacional	3	1	1	1	3	3	0	4		2–1			
2	Académica	3	1	1	1	3	3	0	4			1–1		
4	Vitória de Setúbal	3	1	0	2	3	4	−1	3			1–0	1–2	

Source: lpfp.pt (in Portuguese)
Rules for classification: 1) points; 2) goal difference; 3) number of goals scored.

=== Group B ===
Pos	Team	Pld	W	D	L	GF	GA	GD	Pts	Qualification	SCP	RAV	MAR	PAÇ
1	Sporting CP	3	3	0	0	9	1	+8	9	Advance to knockout phase			3–0	5–1
2	Rio Ave	3	1	0	2	3	4	−1	3		0–1			
3	Marítimo	3	1	0	2	3	6	−3	3			1–2		2–1
4	Paços de Ferreira	3	1	0	2	4	8	−4	3			2–1		

Source: lpfp.pt (in Portuguese)
Rules for classification: 1) points; 2) goal difference; 3) number of goals scored.

=== Group C ===
Pos	Team	Pld	W	D	L	GF	GA	GD	Pts	Qualification	BEN	VGU	BEL	OLH
1	Benfica	3	3	0	0	7	1	+6	9	Advance to knockout phase			1–0	4–1
2	Vitória de Guimarães	3	1	1	1	3	2	+1	4	Advance to knockout phase	0–2			3–0
3	Belenenses	3	1	1	1	2	1	+1	4			0–0		
4	Olhanense	3	0	0	3	1	9	−8	0				0–2	

Source: lpfp.pt (in Portuguese)
Rules for classification: 1) points; 2) goal difference; 3) number of goals scored.

== Knockout phase ==
=== Semi-finals ===
The semi-finals were held as one-legged matches with the two teams that had the highest number of points in the third round being given the home ground advantage. The draw was held at the LPFP headquarters on 20 January 2009, 12:30 UTC. The matches were played on 4 February 2009.

4 February 2009
21:15 UTC

Benfica	2–1	Vitória de Guimarães
Arnolin 69' (o.g.); Aimar 87'		Desmarets 89'

Estádio da Luz, Lisbon
Referee: Artur Soares Dias

4 February 2009
19:00 UTC

Sporting CP	4–1	Porto
Romagnoli 35' (pen.), 48' (pen.); Derlei 65', 80'		Sektioui 9'

Estádio José Alvalade, Lisbon
Referee: Carlos Xistra

=== Final ===
21 March 2009
19:45 UTC

Sporting CP	1–1 (a.e.t.)	Benfica
Pereirinha 48'		Reyes 75' (pen.)
Penalties
Romagnoli (penalty scored); Rochemback (penalty missed); Moutinho (penalty scored); Derlei (penalty missed); Postiga (penalty missed)	2–3	(penalty missed) Aimar; (penalty scored) Cardozo; (penalty missed) Katsouranis; (penalty scored) David Luiz; (penalty scored) Martins

Estádio Algarve, Faro
Referee: Lucílio Baptista
