= 2007–08 S.L. Benfica season =

Benfica
2007–08 season
- President: Luís Filipe Vieira
- Head coach: Fernando Santos (until 20 August 2007); José Antonio Camacho (until 9 March 2008); Fernando Chalana (caretaker)
- Stadium: Estádio da Luz
- Primeira Liga: 4th
- Taça de Portugal: Semi-finals
- Taça da Liga: Fourth round
- UEFA Champions League: Group stage
- UEFA Cup: Round of 16
- Top goalscorer: League: Óscar Cardozo (13); All: Óscar Cardozo (22)
- Highest home attendance: 60,116 v Porto (1 December 2007)
- Lowest home attendance: 10,494 v Moreirense (27 February 2008)
- Average home league attendance: 37,558
- Biggest win: Benfica 6–1 Boavista (11 November 2007)
- Biggest defeat: Benfica 0–3 Académica (11 April 2008)
Home colours	Away colours

The 2007–08 European football season was the 104th of S.L. Benfica's existence and the club's 74th consecutive season in the top flight of Portuguese football. The season ran from 1 July 2007 to 30 June 2008, and Benfica competed domestically in the Primeira Liga, Taça de Portugal and Taça da Liga. The club also participated in the UEFA Champions League after finishing third in the Primeira Liga the previous season.

Fernando Santos remained for a second season, which saw significant financial investment. To counter-weight the loss of influential players such as Simão, Miccoli, Giorgos Karagounis and Manuel Fernandes, Benfica signed Óscar Cardozo, David Luiz, Ángel Di María, Maxi Pereira, Cristian Rodríguez and more than ten others.

Santos remained for only two games: a UEFA Champions League qualifying match against Copenhagen and the Primeira Liga opener against Leixões. He was sacked and replaced by José Antonio Camacho, who affirmed the club's presence in top European competition and guided them to second place. In October and November, Benfica was eliminated from the Taça da Liga and the Champions League respectively, securing a UEFA Cup berth by finishing third in the latter. Over the next three months, Camacho's team became increasingly erratic, qualifying for the Portuguese Cup semi-finals but losing crucial points in the league race.

In early March, Camacho resigned after three consecutive league draws, citing his inability to motivate the club. His assistant Fernando Chalana then took over, but Benfica continued to disappoint; they were eliminated in the UEFA Cup and mired in second place in mid-March. In April, the situation deteriorated further; Benfica matched their worst league defeat in 60 years, slipped to fourth place, and was knocked out of the Portuguese Cup by Sporting CP. An away draw in May's opening game left the club dangerously close to finishing fourth. One week later, fans had the bitter-sweet experience of celebrating Rui Costa's final match and seeing Benfica finish fourth, their worst finish since 2001–02.

== Season summary ==
=== Pre-season ===
During Benfica's season-ending North American tour after the last game of 2006–07, Fernando Santos spoke to the media about his plans for the upcoming season. As promised by club president Luís Filipe Vieira, the club would spend more on new players to build a team capable of winning the title. Simão was crucial; according to Santos, "I cannot see myself without Simão". In addition, he wanted to keep Fabrizio Miccoli and sign a new striker who could be a target man. The club's first addition was winger Fábio Coentrão in March, followed by defenders Marco Zoro and David Luiz in May; the latter signed a five-year contract after performing well on loan. In June, Benfica began their promised investments, spending over €9 million on Óscar Cardozo from Newell's Old Boys and a reported €2.5 million on Gonzalo Bergessio. Both added options to an offence composed solely of Nuno Gomes and Mantorras, since Fabrizio Miccoli and Derlei did not renew their loan agreements. Breaking with tradition, Benfica did not tour abroad; they remained at the club's new training center, Benfica Campus. Santos also decided not to participate in the Teresa Herrera Trophy, since the tournament was too close to Benfica's first league match.

On 2 July, the club began their pre-season preparations, with medical tests in the morning followed by an afternoon training session attended by 3,000 supporters. From the beginning, Santos lost players who had been the backbone of the previous season's team; Giorgos Karagounis departed first and Anderson pressed for a transfer, deliberately missing a pre-season match. On the pitch, Benfica played RM Hamm Benfica on 8 July and CFR Cluj on the 21st. Santos experienced a major loss with the transfer of Simão to Atlético Madrid on 26 July. The 28-year-old winger had been with the club for six seasons and the top scorer for four; according to Santos, the prospect of losing him was a "horrible nightmare". To replace him, Benfica signed the 19-year-old Argentine Ángel Di María from Rosario Central. Before playing in the Guadiana Trophy on 3 and 5 August, Benfica lost 2–1 to Al Ahly in Egypt. At the Guadiana Trophy, Benfica drew with Real Betis and defeated Lisbon rivals Sporting CP, ending their pre-season preparations four days later with a match against Estrela da Amadora.

=== August–September ===
Benfica's first competitive match hosted Copenhagen on 14 August in the third qualifying round of the UEFA Champions League. Santos was confident in a win due to his familiarity with Copenhagen's style, since Benfica had played them twice in the past tournament. In the match, Rui Costa scored two long-range goals for a 2–1 win. Santos was pleased, despite Copenhagen's goal disconcerting his team. The next day, Benfica accepted an offer for Manuel Fernandes from Everton. His departure troubled Santos, since Fernandes had been a growing influence on the team during the pre-season. On 18 August, Benfica began their Primeira Liga campaign against Leixões. Without the injured Luisão or Ángel Di María, the club lost their first points in a 1–1 draw after a 94th-minute equaliser. The slip had an immediate impact, with Luís Filipe Vieira sacking Santos two games into the season. Santos, caught off guard, said, "I am not hurt, maybe just surprised". Benfica immediately signed José Antonio Camacho, who had managed the team from 2002 to 2004, to replace him. Camacho was happy to return, acknowledging that his friendship with Vieira played an important role in his quick hiring. In his first game, Camacho could not lead Benfica past Vitória de Guimarães, who earned a scoreless draw at Estádio da Luz. Benfica signed more players: Uruguayans Maxi Pereira and Cristian Rodríguez first, followed by Brazilian centre-back Edcarlos. In the last match of August, Benfica confirmed their place in the group stage of the Champions League with an away win in Parken Stadium. The next day, the club was drawn into group D alongside Milan, Celtic and Shakhtar Donetsk.

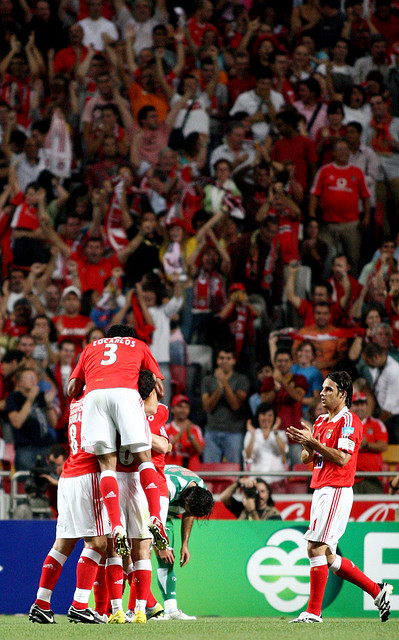
Benfica celebrate a goal against Naval on 15 September

On 2 September, Benfica played Nacional at the Estádio da Choupana. They scored their first goal in the 17th minute, adding two more in the second half for their first league win. A delighted Camacho said, "I liked the second half a lot. We were much better altogether." After a two-week international break, Benfica resumed competition against Naval on the 15th. Cristian Rodríguez scored the opener in the 22nd minute, followed by Rui Costa a few minutes later. In the second half, Nuno Gomes scored the third and final goal. Although Camacho was pleased with the win, he was concerned about his team's early performance. Three days later, Benfica visited the San Siro to play Milan. Their opening game in the group stage did not go as planned; they conceded an early goal by Andrea Pirlo, who scored again with an assist by Filippo Inzaghi. Nuno Gomes scored in the 92nd minute of the 2–1 loss. Camacho was philosophical: "You pay for every mistake you make against a side like Milan. I don't blame our lack of experience because we were facing the best team in Europe." On 23 September, Benfica played Braga at the Municipal de Braga; both teams failed to convert several goal opportunities for a scoreless draw. Camacho was unconcerned with the result, since the league race had many matches remaining. Benfica played Estrela da Amadora at the Estádio da Reboleira in the third round of the new League Cup the following Wednesday, winning on penalty kicks and advancing to the next round. September ended with the Lisbon derby against Sporting CP. For the second time in a week, Benfica could not break their opponent's defence, conceding their fourth draw of the season. Camacho attributed the result to wasted opportunities: "We only failed in scoring. We had many shots; many were good, but football is like this."

=== October–November ===
October began with the club hosting Shakhtar Donetsk in a 1–0 loss to Mircea Lucescu's team on a goal by Jádson. After the game Camacho said, "We played some decent football and although at times we had five, six, seven men in the area, the ball refused to go in." On 7 October, Benfica visited the Estádio Dr. Magalhães Pessoa to play União de Leiria. Despite conceding an early goal, the partnership of Cardozo and Nuno Gomes was successful; Gomes scored twice to give Benfica the three points. After a two-week break for international matches, Benfica's season resumed on 20 October with a League Cup match against Vitória de Setúbal. Camacho made many changes in the starting eleven, which nearly cost him the game. A 12th-minute Setúbal goal was not matched until the 94th minute, by Freddy Adu. Despite the near-loss, Camacho said, "I am satisfied with our performance. The players worked well and he had many chances to score." The following Wednesday, Benfica hosted Celtic for matchday three of the Champions League. They continued struggling to convert goal opportunities, hitting the goal post twice in quick succession before finally breaking Celtic's defence with an 87th-minute winning goal by Cardozo. Camacho praised his players for not giving up and staying calm under pressure. On 28 October, Benfica hosted Marítimo for the Primeira Liga. Although Kanú scored first for Marítimo in the eighth minute, Cardozo evened the score ten minutes later. Marítimo had an opportunity to regain the lead when Quim incurred a penalty and was sent off but his replacement, Hans-Jörg Butt, stopped the penalty kick. In the second half, Adu scored the winning goal for ten-men Benfica in the 87th minute. Camacho said about teams like Marítimo, "We have to change our mentality and never relax, because for teams like Marítimo or Vitória de Setúbal, their 'Champions League' is facing Benfica." On the last day of October, Benfica visited the Estádio do Bonfim for their second game against Vitória de Setúbal, and the remodelled team led at half-time. During the second half Setúbal, pushing hard, scored twice to knock Benfica out of the League Cup. Camacho said, "We were eliminated because they were better. It was a fair loss."

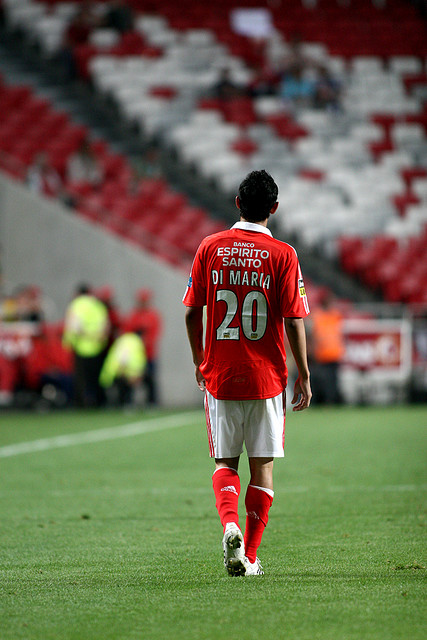
Ángel Di María succeeded Simão as number 20.

November's first game was at the Mata Real against Paços de Ferreira. Benfica scored first with a header by Cristian Rodríguez, but Tiago Valente tied the game a few minutes later for Paços. In the 85th minute, Kostas Katsouranis scored Benfica's winning goal with an assist by Rodríguez. To Camacho, the win was "difficult but very important". On 6 November, Benfica played Celtic on the road. In their second game against the team, Benfica lost 1–0 on a goal by Aiden McGeady. With the loss, Benfica was in last place and needed to defeat Milan to remain in the Champions League. Although Camacho was optimistic, he was aware of the high stakes. On 11 November, Benfica hosted Boavista in search of their fourth consecutive win in the Primeira Liga. Cardozo scored in the first half, with Boavista tying the score in the 58th minute. Benfica then scored five goals in the final 40 minutes for a 6–1 win. After the match, Rui Costa said, "We had our fourth consecutive win in the Primeira Liga, and I think we are on the right track." After a third international break, Benfica resumed on the 24th with an away game against Académica. Lito scored first for Académica, but a free kick by Rui Costa tied the game. Académica goalkeeper Ricardo made two errors, allowing Luisão and Adu to score Benfica's second and third goals, and Camacho credited the late win to his players' perseverance and commitment. November ended with a decisive match against Milan. Andrea Pirlo scored for Benfica, but Maxi Pereira's 23rd-minute shot tied the game. Benfica's fate was determined by events in Glasgow, as Celtic defeated Shakhtar Donetsk with an added-time goal. Camacho bemoaned his team's luck: "We're a bit unhappy. For what we did in this competition I think we should have had more of a chance to go through, so for me football has not been fair to Benfica."

=== December–January ===
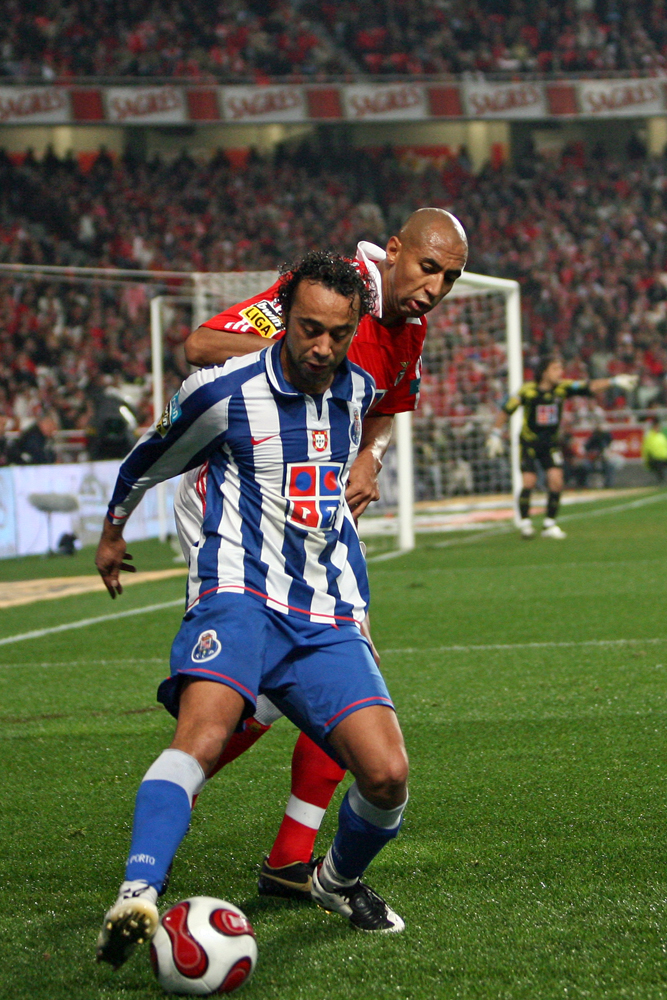
Luisão pressing Tarik Sektioui in the Clássico on 1 December

On 1 December, Benfica played Porto in the Clássico. Ricardo Quaresma took advantage of a 42nd-minute counterattack to dribble past David Luiz and score the winning goal for Porto. It was Benfica's first league loss at Luz since 28 January 2006. Camacho said, "We were inexperienced, failed to retain the ball and allowed counter-attacks." Three days later, Benfica travelled to Donetsk to play Shakhtar in the final match of the Champions League group stage, and Cardozo scored twice in the first 25 minutes to give Benfica the win. The club overtook Shakhtar, finishing third and qualifying for the UEFA Cup, and Camacho was pleased with the result. On 9 December, Benfica began their Portuguese Cup run by hosting Académica. The club won with goals by Luisão and Cardozo; Académica scored a consolation goal after a mistake by Benfica's goalkeeper, Butt. According to Camacho, "We suffered a bit in the second half. Académica's goal complicated things." League play resumed on 15 December, with Benfica commuting to the Estádio do Restelo to face Belenenses. The club failed to stem their hosts' momentum, giving up a 71st-minute goal for their second-straight league loss. Camacho accepted the blame: "When you lose it is always the manager's fault. I failed to pass the message to my players." Benfica ended 2007 by hosting Estrela da Amadora on 20 December, winning 3–0 with all goals scored in the second half. The win placed Benfica seven points behind league leaders Porto, who had their first league loss to Nacional. On 21 December, Benfica participated in the UEFA Cup draw for the round of 32 and was paired with German team 1. FC Nürnberg.

Benfica began the year with a match against Vitória de Setúbal. After trouble penetrating Setúbal's defense, Mantorras scored in the 71st minute. However, Setúbal rallied and tied the game for a point. The result surprised Camacho: "I though we would win. After we scored, we did not retained the ball. A team like Benfica has to do that." Two Benfica players, Luisão and Katsouranis, had a disagreement during the game; they were immediately substituted, and later suspended. On 12 January, Benfica hosted Leixões at the Luz. They struggled to control Leixões, who had the upper hand in a scoreless draw. Camacho was disappointed: "We lacked focus; it's apparent since the Champions League elimination that we do." A week later, Benfica played Feirense in the fifth round of the Portuguese Cup, advancing to the next round on a 52nd-minute goal by Cardozo. Camacho said, "I did not like the game. We are playing differently than we are training. The difference in quality between both teams should have been obvious and it was not." On 26 January, Benfica played Vitória de Guimarães at the Estádio D. Afonso Henriques. They scored in the eighth minute, when Cardozo converted a free kick from 30 meters out. Di María assisted Maxi Pereira on a second goal, with Guimarães scoring in the 60th minute. In extra time, Cardozo scored his second goal on a mistake by Nilson.

=== February–March ===
February was a busy month for the club. Benfica trailed Porto by 11 points in the Primeira Liga, with crucial European and domestic cup matches between league matches. The first was on 2 February against Nacional. Like past home performances, Benfica failed to score and lost points in another scoreless draw. Camacho tried to explain his team's performance: "We did not lack attitude, but at home, we sometimes feel disturbed, pressured. We played two forwards and we still did not score." He saw his first white handkerchiefs, an action commonly seen as a request for resignation. Benfica regained their feet with a home win against Paços de Ferreira in the Portuguese Cup. An opening goal by Pedrinha in the second minute was answered with an equaliser by Cardozo before half-time. In the second half, Cardozo, Rui Costa and Nuno Assis scored to send Benfica to the quarter-finals. On 14 February, Benfica hosted 1. FC Nürnberg in the first of two games against the German team. Recent acquisition Ariza Makukula scored the only goal in the 43rd minute, a 20-meter strike which fooled goalkeeper Jaromír Blažek. Camacho called the narrow victory important. Three days later, Benfica played Naval at the Municipal José Bento Pessoa. Cristian Rodríguez scored the club's opening goal in the 18th minute, with László Sepsi assisting Nuno Assis on a second goal in the final minute. On 21 February, Benfica played the second leg of their European double-header with Nürnberg. The Bundesliga side scored twice in seven minutes during the second half before Cardozo scored in the 89th minute and Di María tied the game in the 92nd, sending Benfica to the round of 16 with Spanish side Getafe. Camacho said, "Benfica made some defensive errors in the second half that put them in a tough spot. They managed to react and continued their search for goals until they arrived." In domestic-league play, Benfica hosted Braga on 24 January. Braga scored first with a fifth-minute goal by Zé Manel, with Luisão tying the game in the 21sth minute. The draw complicated the league race, with Porto increasing their lead. Camacho said, "Benfica did everything they could win. They tried to score from every way possible, but could not". The club ended the month with a 2–0 victory over Moreirense in the Portuguese Cup, sending them to the semi-finals.

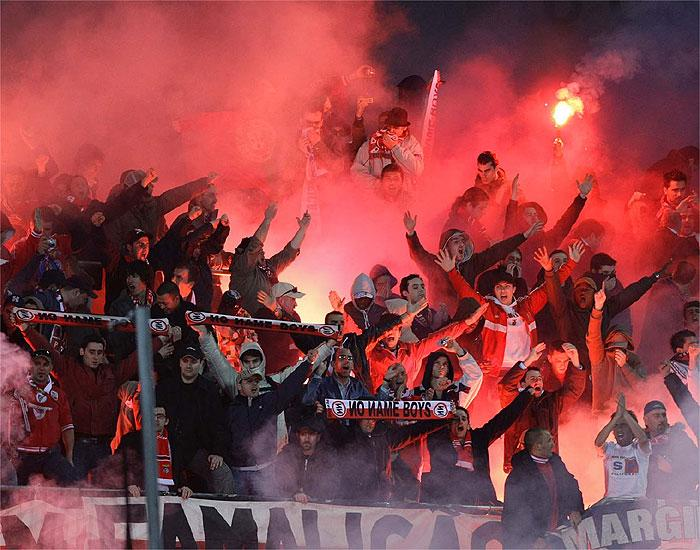
The No Name Boys supporting Benfica at the Coliseum Alfonso Pérez on 12 March

Benfica began March competing at three levels: the Primeira Liga, the Portuguese Cup and the UEFA Cup. Their first game was at the Estádio José Alvalade against Sporting CP. Managed by Paulo Bento, the hosts scored the opening goal in the 11th minute with a header by Simon Vukčević. In the 40th minute, Rui Costa's corner kick allowed Cardozo to head in the tying goal. Benfica held second place, five points ahead of Sporting. For Camacho, the result was "very important because we kept our advantage, allowing us to remain in second place". The following Thursday, Benfica hosted Getafe in the UEFA Cup. The match quickly soured for the club when Cardozo was sent off in the ninth minute, and Rubén de la Red scored Getafe's first goal in the 25th minute. During the second half Pablo Hernández added another, and Mantorras scored a 76th-minute consolation goal for Benfica. Camacho said, "We started poorly because Getafe has a good team. With Cardozo's ejection, things got more complicated. In the second half, Benfica was better, the players fought and showed we have a chance to eliminate them." On 9 March, Benfica hosted União de Leiria. They conceded an opening goal in the 42nd minute, scoring two second-half goals in five minutes: one each by Zoro and Cardozo. Serge N'Gal scored a 69th-minute equaliser for the draw. The result had repercussions, as Camacho resigned: "I cannot do anything else to improve this team's performance." His resignation, so late in the season, caught Benfica's management by surprise. They opted to not replace him, nominating his assistant Fernando Chalana as manager. Chalana accepted the challenge: "I am here through thick and thin." His first game as manager was against Getafe on the road on 12 March. Benfica had to score two and allow none to progress; Makukula hit the post in the sixth minute, and Getafe qualified with a 77th-minute goal by Juan Ángel Albín. Four days later, Benfica played Marítimo at Barreiros, with Cardozo scoring his 19th goal of the season in the 26th minute. In the second half, Ytalo scored a 75th-minute equaliser for Marítimo. Chalana said, "We had a great first half. We dominated and honestly I was not expecting Marítimo's goal. I was sad with the way it appeared. We did everything to win." The fourth consecutive draw cost Benfica their lead over Vitória de Guimarães for second place. Back from international break, the club hosted Paços de Ferreira on 30 March in a 4–1 win. At half-time, the score was 1–1, but Cardozo and Rui Costa's second-half goals gave Benfica their first domestic win in March.

=== April–May ===
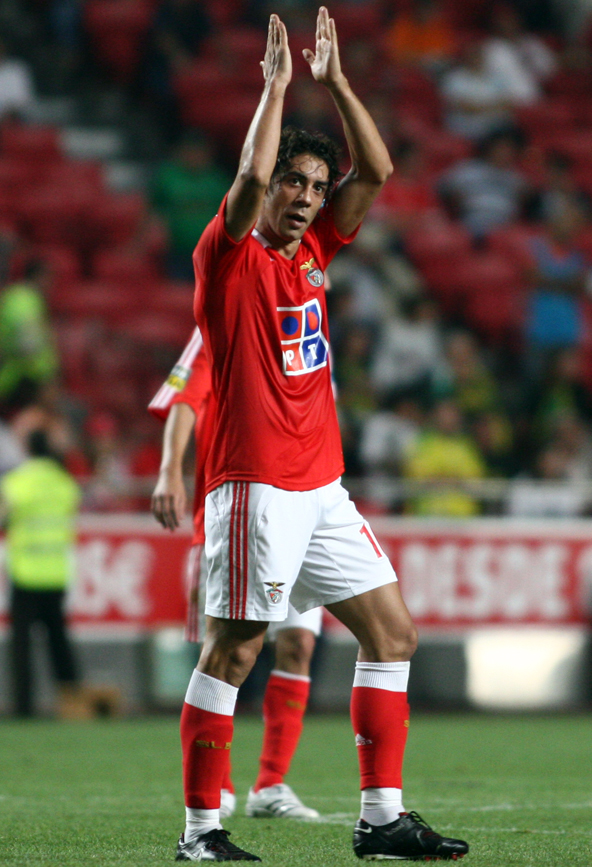
Rui Costa's last game, on 11 May, attracted over 54,000 fans.

As the season wound down, Benfica was battling for a direct qualification for the Champions League with six matches remaining. On 6 April, the club played Boavista on the road. The hosts were undefeated at home since October, but Benfica had an opportunity to gain ground over Vitória de Guimarães (who had lost points hours earlier). Neither team could penetrate the other's defence, despite Boavista's 24th-minute penalty kick, and the game ended in a scoreless draw. Chalana was highly critical of the refereeing: "What happened here was a disgrace." The following Friday, Benfica hosted Académica. In the fourth minute Luisão lost the ball to Miguel Pedro, who scored for Académica. At the 30-minute mark, Markus Berger added another, and in the second half, Luis Aguiar scored a third. It was the fourth time in Benfica's history that they lost by three goals at home, matching their worst result in the Primeira Liga. They had lost 3–0 to Boavista in 1998–99 and 4–1 to Sporting CP in 1938–39 and 1947–48. Chalana was resigned: "There are days like this." With the loss, Benfica had lost 18 points in Luz, was 21 points behind Porto and fell from second to fourth place. On 16 April, the club visited the Alvalade for the Portuguese Cup semi-finals. Benfica began the game well, with first-half goals by Rui Costa and Nuno Gomes. Sporting mobilized in the second half, scoring three goals in 12 minutes. Rodríguez tied the game for Benfica before Sporting scored two more goals, eliminating Benfica. Chalana attributed the loss to poor refereeing: "We started strong, scored two goals and could have scored a third if the referee had signalled a penalty over Luisão. It would be the 3–0 and would have killed the game." Four days later, Benfica played Porto at the Estádio do Dragão. Lisandro López scored goals in the seventh and 80th minutes to give Porto a 2–0 win, increasing the difference between them to 24 points. Despite amassing five out of a possible 15 points since becoming manager and trailing second-place Vitória de Guimarães by four points, Chalana remained hopeful: "Nothing is lost, Benfica will use all their weapons to win the remaining nine points." The club's last April match was a 2–0 victory over Belenenses, with Chalana praising his players' performance against "a very good team".

In May, Benfica had two games in which to overcome a four-point deficit. On the fourth, they played Estrela da Amadora away. Benfica never beat Estrela's goalkeeper, Pedro Alves, drawing 0–0 and losing crucial points. Chalana said, "We started the first half somewhat nervous. Not playing our best. However, the second half was different, we did everything to win, created opportunities but the ball just would not go in." The draw left Benfica dependent on others to reach second place; even if they won, Sporting had to lose and Guimarães had to lose or draw. On 11 May, the club hosted Vitória de Setúbal. The match, attracting over 54,000 fans for Rui Costa's last game, was a 3–0 Benfica win. Sporting and Guimarães also won and Benfica finished fourth, missing a Champions League berth. It was their fifth finish outside the top three after fourth-place finishes in 1939–40, 1940–41 and 2001–02 and a sixth-place finish in 2000–01. Chalana said, "Benfica is very big. We failed to reach our objectives, but nearly sold out the stadium today." The club's season ended with an African tour in which they defeated a team with players from Sal and São Vicente on 17 May and the Angolan national team two days later.

== Competitions ==
Win Draw Loss Postponed

=== Overall record ===
Competition	Started	First match	Last match	Finished	Record								
Competition	Started	First match	Last match	Finished	G	W	D	L	GF	GA	GD	Win %	Source
Primeira Liga	—	18 August 2007	11 May 2008	4th	30	13	13	4	45	21	+24	43.33	
Taça de Portugal	Fourth round	9 December 2007	16 April 2008	Semi-finals	5	4	0	1	13	7	+6	80.00	
Taça da Liga	Third round	26 September 2007	31 October 2007	Fourth round	3	0	2	1	3	4	−1	0.00	
UEFA Champions League	QR3	14 August 2007	4 December 2007	GS / 3rd	8	4	1	3	8	7	+1	50.00	
UEFA Cup	Round of 32	14 February 2008	12 March 2008	Round of 16	4	1	1	2	4	5	−1	25.00	
Total					50	22	17	11	73	44	+29	44.00	

=== Primeira Liga ===
==== League table ====
Pos	Team	Pld	W	D	L	GF	GA	GD	Pts	Qualification or relegation
2	Sporting CP	30	16	7	7	46	28	+18	55	Qualification to Champions League group stage
3	Vitória de Guimarães	30	15	8	7	35	31	+4	53	Qualification to Champions League third qualifying round
4	Benfica	30	13	13	4	45	21	+24	52	Qualification to UEFA Cup first round
5	Marítimo	30	14	4	12	39	28	+11	46	Qualification to UEFA Cup first round
6	Vitória de Setúbal	30	11	12	7	37	33	+4	45	Qualification to UEFA Cup first round

Source: BDFutbol
Rules for classification: 1) points; 2) goal difference; 3) number of goals scored.

==== Results by round ====
Round	1	2	3	4	5	6	7	8	9	10	11	12	13	14	15	16	17	18	19	20	21	22	23	24	25	26	27	28	29	30
Ground	A	H	A	H	A	H	A	H	A	H	A	H	A	H	A	H	A	H	A	H	A	H	A	H	A	H	A	H	A	H
Result	D	D	W	W	D	D	W	W	W	W	W	L	L	W	D	D	W	D	W	D	D	D	D	W	D	L	L	W	D	W
Position	6	9	4	3	4	5	4	2	2	2	2	2	2	2	2	2	2	2	2	2	2	2	2	2	2	4	4	4	4	4

Source: FootballPortugal.net
A = Away; H = Home; W = Win; D = Draw; L = Loss

==== Matches ====
18 August 2007 1	Leixões	1–1	Benfica	Leixões
21:00	Nwoko 90+4'	Report	Petit 89'	Stadium: Estádio do Bessa; Attendance: 12,710; Referee: Jorge Sousa

25 August 2007 2	Benfica	0–0	Vitória de Guimarães	Lisbon
19:15		Report		Stadium: Estádio da Luz; Attendance: 52,464; Referee: Lucílio Baptista

2 September 2007 3	Nacional	0–3	Benfica	Funchal
21:15		Report	Cardozo 17', 76'; Rui Costa 69'	Stadium: Estádio da Madeira; Attendance: 4,000; Referee: Bruno Paixão

15 September 2007 4	Benfica	3–0	Naval	Lisbon
21:15	Rodríguez 22'; Rui Costa 35'; Nuno Gomes 52'	Report		Stadium: Estádio da Luz; Attendance: 34,712; Referee: Rui Silva

23 September 2007 5	Braga	0–0	Benfica	Braga
18:00		Report		Stadium: Estádio Municipal de Braga; Attendance: 21,804; Referee: Paulo Costa

29 September 2007 6	Benfica	0–0	Sporting CP	Lisbon
19:15		Report		Stadium: Estádio da Luz; Attendance: 48,222; Referee: Pedro Henriques

7 October 2007 7	União de Leiria	1–2	Benfica	Leiria
19:15	Cadu 1'	Report	Nuno Gomes 15', 65'	Stadium: Estádio Dr. Magalhães Pessoa; Attendance: 8,960; Referee: João Ferreira

28 October 2007 8	Benfica	2–1	Marítimo	Lisbon
20:45	Cardozo 18'; Quim (red card) 31'; Adu 86'	Report	Kanú 86'	Stadium: Estádio da Luz; Attendance: 44,312; Referee: Pedro Proença

3 November 2007 9	Paços de Ferreira	1–2	Benfica	Paços de Ferreira
19:45	Valente 29'	Report	Rodríguez 21'; Katsouranis 85'	Stadium: Estádio da Mata Real; Attendance: 3,016; Referee: Bruno Paixão

11 November 2007 10	Benfica	6–1	Boavista	Lisbon
18:00	Cardozo 18'; Pereira 62'; Rodríguez 66'; Silva 80' (o.g.); Nuno Gomes 85', 88' (pen.)	Report	Zé Kalanga (yellow card) 27' (yellow-red card) 55'; Ribeiro 57'	Stadium: Estádio da Luz; Attendance: 35,379; Referee: Paulo Paraty

24 November 2007 11	Académica	1–3	Benfica	Coimbra
21:15	Lito 24'	Report	Rui Costa 34'; Luisão 86'; Adu 90'	Stadium: Estádio Cidade de Coimbra; Attendance: 16,185; Referee: Olegário Benquerença

1 December 2007 12	Benfica	0–1	Porto	Lisbon
19:45		Report	Quaresma 42'	Stadium: Estádio da Luz; Attendance: 60,116; Referee: Jorge Sousa

15 December 2007 13	Belenenses	1–0	Benfica	Lisbon
19:30	Weldon 70'	Report		Stadium: Estádio do Restelo; Attendance: 5,000; Referee: Paulo Baptista

20 December 2007 14	Benfica	3–0	Estrela da Amadora	Lisbon
21:15	Rodríguez 52'; Cardozo 71' (pen.); Nuno Gomes 90'	Report		Stadium: Estádio da Luz; Attendance: 24,823; Referee: Hugo Miguel

5 January 2008 15	Vitória de Setúbal	1–1	Benfica	Setúbal
19:15	Edinho 88'	Report	Mantorras 71'	Stadium: Estádio do Bonfim; Attendance: 5,000; Referee: Paulo Paraty

12 January 2008 16	Benfica	0–0	Leixões	Lisbon
19:00		Report		Stadium: Estádio da Luz; Attendance: 28,930; Referee: Paulo Costa

26 January 2008 17	Vitória de Guimarães	1–3	Benfica	Guimarães
21:15	Ghilas 60'	Report	Cardozo 7', 90'; Pereira 26'	Stadium: Estádio D. Afonso Henriques; Attendance: 25,710; Referee: João Ferreira

2 February 2008 18	Benfica	0–0	Nacional	Lisbon
21:15		Report		Stadium: Estádio da Luz; Attendance: 31,694; Referee: Olegário Benquerença

17 February 2008 19	Naval	0–2	Benfica	Figueira da Foz
19:15		Report	Rodríguez 19'; Nuno Assis 90'	Stadium: Estádio Municipal José Bento Pessoa; Attendance: 4,981; Referee: Rui Costa

24 February 2008 20	Benfica	1–1	Braga	Lisbon
20:00	Luisão 20'	Report	Zé Manel 5'	Stadium: Estádio da Luz; Attendance: 31,220; Referee: Jorge Sousa

2 March 2008 21	Sporting CP	1–1	Benfica	Lisbon
20:30	Vukčević 11'	Report	Cardozo 40'; Nélson (red card) 76'	Stadium: Estádio de Alvalade; Attendance: 40,659; Referee: Paulo Paraty

9 March 2008 22	Benfica	2–2	União de Leiria	Lisbon
18:00	Zoro 51'; Cardozo 56'	Report	Paulo César 42'; N'Gal 69'	Stadium: Estádio da Luz; Attendance: 29,496; Referee: Vasco Santos

16 March 2008 23	Marítimo	1–1	Benfica	Funchal
19:00	Ytalo 74'	Report	Cardozo 25'	Stadium: Estádio dos Barreiros; Attendance: 9,000; Referee: Bruno Paixão

30 March 2008 24	Benfica	4–1	Paços de Ferreira	Lisbon
20:15	Rodríguez 24'; Cardozo 69'; Rui Costa 75', 85'	Report		Stadium: Estádio da Luz; Attendance: 23,772; Referee: Elmano Santos

6 April 2008 25	Boavista	0–0	Benfica	Porto
19:45		Report		Stadium: Estádio do Bessa; Attendance: 14,341; Referee: Lucílio Baptista

11 April 2008 26	Benfica	0–3	Académica	Lisbon
19:30		Report	Miguel Pedro 4'; Berger 31'; L. Aguiar 65'	Stadium: Estádio da Luz; Attendance: 30,222; Referee: Paulo Baptista

20 April 2008 27	Porto	2–0	Benfica	Porto
19:30	López 7', 80'	Report	Binya (yellow card) 17' (yellow-red card) 90'	Stadium: Estádio do Dragão; Attendance: 50,199; Referee: Bruno Paixão

26 April 2008 28	Benfica	2–0	Belenenses	Lisbon
18:45	Luisão 41'; Cardozo 65'	Report		Stadium: Estádio da Luz; Attendance: 33,047; Referee: Artur Soares Dias

4 May 2008 29	Estrela da Amadora	0–0	Benfica	Lisbon
18:15		Report		Stadium: Estádio da Reboleira; Attendance: 3,112; Referee: Pedro Proença

11 May 2008 30	Benfica	3–0	Vitória de Setúbal	Lisbon
19:15	Katsouranis 25'; Cardozo 42'; Nuno Gomes 88'	Report		Stadium: Estádio da Luz; Attendance: 54,222; Referee: Jorge Sousa

=== Taça de Portugal ===
9 December 2007 Fourth round	Benfica	3–1	Académica	Lisbon
20:45	Luisão 40'; Cardozo 45', 80'	Report	Ousmane N'Doye 53'	Stadium: Estádio da Luz

19 January 2008 Fifth round	Benfica	1–0	Feirense	Lisbon
16:00	Cardozo 51'	Report		Stadium: Estádio da Luz; Attendance: 15,000; Referee: Bruno Paixão

10 February 2008 Sixth round	Benfica	4–1	Paços de Ferreira	Lisbon
16:00	Cardozo 40' (pen.), 52' (pen.); Rui Costa 77'; Nuno Assis 90'	Report	Pedrinha 2'; Valente (yellow card) 40' (yellow-red card) 51'	Stadium: Estádio da Luz; Referee: Augusto Duarte

27 February 2008 Quarter-final	Benfica	2–0	Moreirense	Lisbon
19:45	Rui Costa 70'; Makukula 87'	Report		Stadium: Estádio da Luz; Attendance: 10,494; Referee: Elmano Santos

16 April 2008 Semi-final	Sporting CP	5–3	Benfica	Lisbon
20:30	Djaló 68', 84'; Liédson 76'; Derlei 79'; Vukčević 90+3'	Report	Rui Costa 19'; Nuno Gomes 31'; Rodríguez 82'	Stadium: Estádio de Alvalade; Attendance: 37,204; Referee: Jorge Sousa

=== Taça da Liga ===
==== Third round ====
26 September 2007	Estrela da Amadora	1–1 (4–5 p)	Benfica	Amadora
20:30	Maurício 36'	Report	90+3' (pen.) Adu	Stadium: Estádio José Gomes; Referee: Duarte Gomes, Lisbon
	Penalties
	Maurício (penalty missed); Mateus (penalty scored); Gomes (penalty scored); Cardoso (penalty scored); Fernando (penalty scored); Yoni (penalty missed)		(penalty scored) Adu; (penalty scored) Rodríguez; (penalty missed) Butt; (penalty scored) Luisão; (penalty scored) Coentrão; (penalty scored) Díaz

==== Fourth round ====
21 October 2007 First leg	Benfica	1–1	Vitória de Setúbal	Lisbon
21:00	Adu 90+4'	Report	12' Matheus	Stadium: Estádio da Luz; Attendance: 17,278; Referee: Jorge Sousa

31 October 2007 Second leg	Vitória de Setúbal	2–1	Benfica	Setúbal
20:45	Matheus 67'; Edinho 82'	Report	45' (pen.) Adu	Stadium: Estádio do Bonfim; Attendance: 5,000; Referee: Paulo Costa, Porto

=== UEFA Champions League ===
==== Third qualifying round ====
14 August 2007 First leg	Benfica	2–1	Copenhagen	Lisbon
19:45	Rui Costa 25', 85'	Report	Hutchinson 35'	Stadium: Estádio da Luz; Attendance: 55,722; Referee: Viktor Kassai (Hungary)

29 August 2007 Second leg	Copenhagen	0–1 (1–3 agg.)	Benfica	Copenhagen
19:45		Report	Katsouranis 17'	Stadium: Parken Stadium; Attendance: 39,711; Referee: Eric Braamhaar (Netherlands)

==== Group D ====
Pos	Team	Pld	W	D	L	GF	GA	GD	Pts	Qualification
1	(Italy) Milan	6	4	1	1	12	5	+7	13	Advance to knockout stage
2	(Scotland) Celtic	6	3	0	3	5	6	−1	9	Advance to knockout stage
3	(Portugal) Benfica	6	2	1	3	5	6	−1	7	Transfer to UEFA Cup
4	(Ukraine) Shakhtar Donetsk	6	2	0	4	6	11	−5	6	

Source: RSSSF

18 September 2007 1	Milan	2–1	Benfica	Milan
20:45	Pirlo 9'; Inzaghi 24'	Report	Nuno Gomes 90+2'	Stadium: San Siro; Attendance: 37,929; Referee: Mike Riley (England)

3 October 2007 2	Benfica	0–1	Shakhtar Donetsk	Lisbon
20:45		Report	Jádson 42'	Stadium: Estádio da Luz; Attendance: 34,647; Referee: Wolfgang Stark (Germany)

24 October 2007 3	Benfica	1–0	Celtic	Lisbon
20:45	Cardozo 87'	Report		Stadium: Estádio da Luz; Attendance: 38,512; Referee: Massimo Busacca (Switzerland)

6 November 2007 4	Celtic	1–0	Benfica	Glasgow
20:45	McGeady 45'	Report		Stadium: Celtic Park; Attendance: 58,691; Referee: Martin Hansson (Sweden)

28 November 2007 5	Benfica	1–1	Milan	Lisbon
20:45	Pereira 20'	Report	Pirlo 15'	Stadium: Estádio da Luz; Attendance: 46,034; Referee: Herbert Fandel (Germany)

4 December 2007 6	Shakhtar Donetsk	1–2	Benfica	Donetsk
20:45	Lucarelli 30' (pen.)	Report	Cardozo 6', 22'	Stadium: RSK Olimpiyskyi; Attendance: 24,200; Referee: Kyros Vassaras (Greece)

=== UEFA Cup ===
==== Round of 32 ====
14 February 2008 First leg	Benfica	1–0	1. FC Nürnberg	Lisbon
21:45	Makukula 43'	Report		Stadium: Estádio da Luz; Attendance: 28,378; Referee: Alexandru Tudor (Romania)

21 February 2008 Second leg	1. FC Nürnberg	2–2 (2–3 agg.)	Benfica	Nuremberg
21:00	Charisteas 59'; Saenko 66'	Report	Cardozo 90'; Di María 90+2'	Stadium: Frankenstadion; Attendance: 42,846; Referee: Ivan Bebek (Croatia)

==== Round of 16 ====
6 March 2008 First leg	Benfica	1–2	Getafe	Lisbon
21:30	Cardozo (red card) 9'; Mantorras 76'	Report	De la Red 25'; Hernández 67'	Stadium: Estádio da Luz; Attendance: 26,925; Referee: Grzegorz Gilewski (Poland)

12 March 2008 Second leg	Getafe	1–0 (3–1 agg.)	Benfica	Getafe
21:00	Albín 77'	Report		Stadium: Coliseum Alfonso Pérez; Attendance: 14,000; Referee: Viktor Kassai (Hungary)

=== Friendlies ===
8 July 2007	Benfica	4–0	RM Hamm Benfica	Seixal, Portugal
17:15 CET (UTC+01)	Mantorras 12'; Bergessio 15'; Dabao 52'; Katsouranis 63'			Stadium: Benfica Campus

21 July 2007	CFR Cluj	2–2	Benfica	Cluj, Romania
19:30 CET (UTC+01)	Dani 48'; Semedo 68'		Rui Costa 54'; Cardozo 66'	Stadium: Stadionul Dr. Constantin Radulescu

29 July 2007	Al Ahly	2–1	Benfica	Cairo, Egypt
19:30 CET (UTC+01)	Mohamed 5' (pen.); Hosni 63'		Nuno Assis 53'	Stadium: Cairo International Stadium

3 August 2007 Guadiana Trophy	Benfica	0–0	Real Betis	Vila Real de Santo António, Portugal
21:15 CET (UTC+01)				Stadium: Complexo Desportivo de Vila Real de Santo; Referee: João Ferreira

5 August 2007 Guadiana Trophy	Benfica	1–0	Sporting CP	Vila Real de Santo António, Portugal
21:15 CET (UTC+01)	David Luiz 79'			Stadium: Complexo Desportivo de Vila Real de Santo; Attendance: 10,000; Referee: Pedro Henriques

17 May 2008	Benfica	2–0	São Vicente and Sal XXI	Espargos, Cape Verde
15:30 CET (UTC+01)	Adu 4'; Mantorras 90'	Report		Stadium: Estádio Marcelo Leitão; Attendance: 8,000

19 May 2008	Benfica	3–2	Angola	Luanda, Angola
15:30 CET (UTC+01)	Rodríguez 2'; Job 66' (o.g.); Pereira 71'	Report	Love 26'; Amaro 90+3'	Stadium: Estádio da Cidadela; Attendance: 15,000

== Player statistics ==
The squad for the season consisted of the players listed in the tables below, as well as staff member Fernando Santos (manager), José António Camacho (manager), Fernando Chalana, (assistant manager and later manager), Jorge Rosário (assistant manager), Pepe Cárcelan (assistant manager), Shéu Han (assistant manager), Bruno Moura (physiotherapist) and Ricardo Santos (scout).

Note 1: Note: Flags indicate national team as defined under FIFA eligibility rules. Players may hold more than one non-FIFA nationality.

Note 2: Players with squad numbers marked ‡ joined the club during the 2007–08 season via transfer, with more details in the following section.

No.	Pos	Nat	Player	Total		Primeira Liga		Taça de Portugal		Taça da Liga		Europe (Note: Includes 8 matches in the Champions League and 4 in the UEFA Cup)	
No.	Pos	Nat	Player	Apps	Goals	Apps	Goals	Apps	Goals	Apps	Goals	Apps	Goals
1	GK	(Portugal) POR	José Moreira	0	0	0	0	0	0	0	0	0	0
2^{‡}	DF	(Portugal) POR	Luís Filipe	32	0	19	0	3	0	2	0	8	0
3^{‡}	DF	(Brazil) BRA	Edcarlos	27	0	16	0	4	0	1	0	6	0
4	DF	(Brazil) BRA	Luisão	35	4	19	3	4	1	3	0	9	0
5	DF	(Brazil) BRA	Léo	42	0	27	0	3	0	0	0	12	0
6	MF	(Portugal) POR	Petit	26	1	17	1	2	0	0	0	7	0
7^{‡}	FW	(Paraguay) PAR	Óscar Cardozo	45	22	29	13	5	5	0	0	11	4
8	DF	(Greece) GRE	Kostas Katsouranis	43	3	27	2	3	0	1	0	12	1
9	FW	(Angola) ANG	Mantorras	14	1	9	1	2	0	1	0	2	0
10	MF	(Portugal) POR	Rui Costa	45	10	29	5	4	3	0	0	12	2
11	DF	(Portugal) POR	Miguelito	3	0	0	0	0	0	3	0	0	0
12	GK	(Portugal) POR	Quim	44	-39	30	-21	1	-5	1	-1	12	-12
14^{‡}	MF	(Uruguay) URU	Maxi Pereira	36	2	23	2	4	0	1	0	8	0
15	MF	(Argentina) ARG	Andrés Díaz	6	0	1	0	0	0	2	0	3	0
16^{‡}	MF	(Portugal) POR	Fábio Coentrão	7	0	3	0	0	0	3	0	1	0
17^{‡}	DF	(Ivory Coast) CIV	Marco Zoro	7	1	2	1	1	0	3	0	1	0
18^{‡}	MF	(Cameroon) CMR	Gilles Binya	25	0	16	0	2	0	3	0	4	0
19^{‡}	FW	(Argentina) ARG	Gonzalo Bergessio	9	0	3	0	0	0	2	0	4	0
20^{‡}	MF	(Argentina) ARG	Ángel Di María	45	0	26	0	5	0	3	0	11	0
21	FW	(Portugal) POR	Nuno Gomes	36	9	25	7	3	1	0	0	8	1
22	DF	(Portugal) POR	Nélson Marcos	30	0	19	0	4	0	1	0	6	0
23	DF	(Brazil) BRA	David Luiz	14	0	8	0	2	0	0	0	4	0
24^{‡}	GK	(Germany) GER	Hans-Jörg Butt	7	-6	1	-1	4	-2	2	-3	0	0
25	MF	(Portugal) POR	Nuno Assis	30	2	17	1	4	1	2	0	7	0
26^{‡}	MF	(Uruguay) URU	Cristian Rodríguez	36	7	24	6	2	1	2	0	8	0
27	MF	(China) CHN	Yu Dabao	3	0	0	0	0	0	3	0	0	0
28	DF	(Portugal) POR	Miguel Vítor	4	0	2	0	0	0	0	0	2	0
30^{‡}	MF	(United States) USA	Freddy Adu	21	5	11	2	3	0	3	3	4	0
32	DF	(Portugal) POR	Romeu Ribeiro	6	0	5	0	0	0	0	0	1	0
33^{‡}	DF	(Romania) ROU	László Sepsi	12	0	7	0	2	0	0	0	3	0
38^{‡}	MF	(Portugal) POR	Ariza Makukula	8	2	3	0	2	1	0	0	3	1
41	FW	(Portugal) POR	André Carvalhas	0	0	0	0	0	0	0	0	0	0
43	MF	(Portugal) POR	David Simão	0	0	0	0	0	0	0	0	0	0
50	DF	(Portugal) POR	Rúben Lima	0	0	0	0	0	0	0	0	0	0
52	DF	(Brazil) BRA	Wagner Silva	0	0	0	0	0	0	0	0	0	0

== Transfers ==
=== In ===
Entry date	Position	Player	From club	Fee	Ref
29 March 2007	LW	Fábio Coentrão	Rio Ave	Undisclosed	
19 May 2007	CB	Marco Zoro	Messina	Free	
30 May 2007	CB	David Luiz	Vitória	Undisclosed	
21 June 2007	ST	Óscar Cardozo	Newell's Old Boys	€9.1M	
22 June 2007	FW	Gonzalo Bergessio	Racing Club	Undisclosed	
29 June 2007	CB	Sreten Sretenović	Rad	Undisclosed	
17 July 2007	GK	Hans-Jörg Butt	Bayer Leverkusen	Free	
27 July 2007	LW	Ángel Di María	Rosario Central	€6M	
27 July 2007	CM	Andrés Díaz	Rosario Central	Free	
30 July 2007	AM	Freddy Adu	Real Salt Lake	€1.9M	
2 August 2007	RB	Luís Filipe	Braga	Undisclosed	
2 August 2007	ST	Jaílson	Corinthians	Undisclosed	
10 August 2007	DM	Gilles Binya	MC Oran	Undisclosed	
26 August 2007	RW	Maxi Pereira	Defensor Sporting	€3M	
30 August 2007	CB	Edcarlos	São Paulo	Undisclosed	
14 January 2008	LB	László Sepsi	Gloria Bistrița	Undisclosed	
30 January 2008	ST	Ariza Makukula	Sevilla	€3.5M	
30 January 2008	CB	Rafik Halliche	NA Hussein Dey	Undisclosed	

=== In by loan ===
Entry date	Position	Player	From club	Exit date	Ref
26 August 2007	LW	Cristian Rodríguez	Paris Saint-Germain	30 June 2008	

=== Out ===
Entry date	Position	Player	From club	Fee	Ref
18 May 2007	LW	Gustavo Manduca	AEK Athens	Undisclosed	
2 June 2007	CB	Eurípedes Amoreirinha	CFR Cluj	Undisclosed	
5 June 2007	GK	Rui Nereu	Académica	Undisclosed	
11 June 2007	CM	Beto	Sion	Undisclosed	
25 June 2007	ST	Derlei	Dynamo Moscow	Loan return	
1 July 2007	LW	Hélio Roque	AEL	Free	
3 July 2007	AM	Giorgos Karagounis	Panathinaikos	Free	
5 July 2007	FW	Fabrizio Miccoli	Juventus	Loan return	
14 July 2007	RW	Carlitos	Basel	Undisclosed	
26 July 2007	LW	Simão	Atlético Madrid	€20M	
24 August 2007	CB	Anderson	Lyon	€4M	
25 August 2007	ST	Azar Karadas	Brann	Undisclosed	
27 August 2007	CM	Manuel Fernandes	Valencia	€18M	
3 December 2007	AM	Andrei Karyaka	Saturn Ramenskoye	Undisclosed	
11 January 2008	AM	Diego de Souza	Palmeiras	Undisclosed	
6 February 2008	FW	Gonzalo Bergessio	San Lorenzo	Undisclosed	

=== Out on loan ===
Entry date	Position	Player	From club	Return date	Ref
5 June 2007	CM	João Coimbra	Nacional	30 June 2008	
2 July 2007	LB	Tiago Gomes	Zagłębie Lubin	30 June 2008	
13 July 2007	GK	Marcelo Moretto	AEK Athens	30 June 2008	
20 July 2007	ST	Marcel	Grêmio	30 June 2008	
20 July 2007	RB	Pedro Correia	Olhanense	30 June 2008	
21 July 2007	RW	Paulo Jorge	Málaga	30 June 2008	
31 July 2007	CB	José Fonte	Crystal Palace	30 June 2008	
2 August 2007	ST	Jaílson	Braga	30 June 2008	
23 August 2007	CB	Sreten Sretenović	Zagłębie Lubin	30 June 2008	
28 August 2007	RW	Manú	AEK Athens	30 June 2008	
31 August 2007	RW	Marco Ferreira	Leicester City	30 June 2008	
1 January 2008	CB	Miguel Vítor	Desportivo das Aves	30 June 2008	
1 January 2008	DM	Romeu Ribeiro	Desportivo das Aves	30 June 2008	
1 January 2008	CB	Yu Dabao	Desportivo das Aves	30 June 2008	
2 January 2008	LB	Miguelito	Braga	30 June 2008	
2 January 2008	LW	Fábio Coentrão	Nacional	30 June 2008	
6 January 2008	CM	Andrés Díaz	Banfield	30 June 2009	
11 January 2008	ST	Marcel	Cruzeiro	30 June 2008	
20 January 2008	RW	Marco Ferreira	Belenenses	30 June 2008	
31 January 2008	CB	Rafik Halliche	Nacional	30 June 2008	
