= Ángel Di María =

Argentine footballer (born 1988)

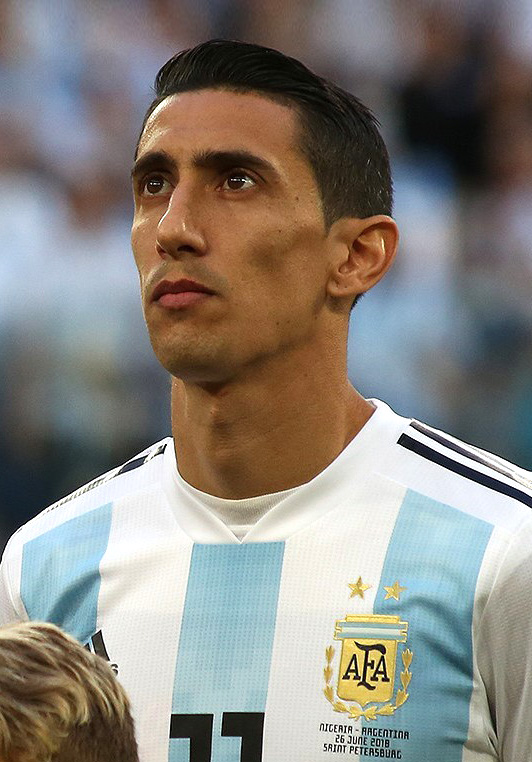
- Di María with Argentina at the 2018 FIFA World Cup

Personal information
- Full name: Ángel Fabián Di María
- Date of birth: 14 February 1988 (age 38)
- Place of birth: Rosario, Argentina
- Height: 1.78 m (5 ft 10 in)
- Positions: Winger; attacking midfielder

Team information
- Current team: Rosario Central
- Number: 11

Youth career
- 1991–1992: Torito
- 1992–2005: Rosario Central

Senior career*
Years	Team	Apps	(Gls)
2005–2007	Rosario Central	35	(6)
2007–2010	Benfica	76	(7)
2010–2014	Real Madrid	124	(22)
2014–2015	Manchester United	27	(3)
2015–2022	Paris Saint-Germain	197	(56)
2022–2023	Juventus	26	(4)
2023–2025	Benfica	53	(17)
2025–	Rosario Central	44	(18)

International career
2007	Argentina U20	11	(5)
2008	Argentina U23	6	(2)
2008–2024	Argentina	145	(31)
Medal record
Men's football
Representing Argentina
FIFA World Cup
Winner	2022 Qatar
Runner-up	2014 Brazil
Copa América
Winner	2021 Brazil
Winner	2024 United States
Runner-up	2015 Chile
Runner-up	2016 United States
Third place	2019 Brazil
CONMEBOL–UEFA Cup of Champions
Winner	2022 England
Olympic Games
Gold medal – first place	2008 Beijing	Team
FIFA U-20 World Cup
Winner	2007 Canada
- * Club domestic league appearances and goals as of 8 November 2026 (UTC)

Ángel Fabián Di María (Spanish pronunciation: [ˈaŋxel faˈβjan di maˈɾia]; born 14 February 1988) is an Argentine professional footballer who plays as a right winger or attacking midfielder for and captains Argentine Primera División club Rosario Central. Known for his dribbling and playmaking, he is regarded as one of the best wingers of his generation and one of Argentina's greatest ever players. He ranks as the all-time Argentine top assist provider, and second overall, in the UEFA Champions League (41) and is Paris Saint-Germain's all-time top assist provider (112). In addition, he is also one of a select number of players who have amassed over 1,000 career appearances.

Di María began his career with Rosario Central but first came into prominence at Benfica after signing for the club in 2007, aged 19. He helped Benfica win the Primeira Liga, the club's first league title in five years, and two Taça da Liga titles. In 2010, Di María moved to Spanish club Real Madrid in a transfer worth €25 million, where he won the 2011–12 La Liga title and the 2013–14 Champions League, amongst other honours. In 2014, Di María was selected in the FIFPRO Men's World 11 and the UEFA Team of the Year. After a falling out with the board at Madrid, he signed for Manchester United in 2014 in a then-British record deal worth £59.7 million (€75.7 million), and inherited the iconic number 7 shirt.

After only one season, Di María left England to join PSG in 2015. In his debut season, he scored the winning goal in the 2016 Coupe de la Ligue final and set a Ligue 1 record with 18 assists in a season, as he won his first of five French league titles as part of a domestic treble. In 2017–18, he was the top scorer in the Coupe de France as PSG won the cup. In 2019–20, Di María was integral in the club's Ligue 1 title win and run to their first Champions League final, finishing as the top assist provider in both Ligue 1 and the Champions League. Di María is one of the club's top goalscorers, with 92 goals. Since leaving PSG in 2022, he has joined Italian side Juventus, re-joined Benfica in 2023, and returned to Rosario in 2025, winning the Primera División in his first season back.

Di María debuted for Argentina internationally in 2008. Playing for the country's Olympic team at the 2008 Olympic Games, Di María scored the winning goal against Nigeria in the final to win Argentina their second successive Olympic gold medal in football. He has 145 caps for his country, including appearing in ten major tournaments; he featured in four FIFA World Cups for Argentina; helping his country reach the final in 2014 and win its third World Cup in 2022, scoring the second goal in the final. Furthermore, Di María was also part of the Argentina squads that reached four Copa América finals, in 2015, 2016, 2021 and 2024, winning the latter two; he netted the only goal in the 2021 final to win Argentina their first trophy in 28 years. He retired from the national team after winning the 2024 Copa América final.

== Early life ==
Di María was born on 14 February 1988 in Rosario, as one of three children of Miguel di María and Diana Hernandez, and grew up in Perdriel. As an infant, he was unusually active, and on the recommendation of a doctor was signed up for football at age three. He also helped his parents with their work at a local coal yard along with his two sisters, Vanesa and Evelyn. Due to the low income his family earned, purchasing football boots and keeping up with Di María's hobby was difficult for his parents. He considers himself to be a "family man" and has used a significant amount of his salary to "give back" to his family. After being transferred to Benfica, he asked his father not to work any more and purchased a house for his parents and sisters.

== Club career ==
=== Rosario Central ===
At age four, Di María joined Rosario Central. As he had already committed to playing for his local club, Torito, 35 footballs were given in compensation.

Di María made his professional debut on 14 December 2005 in Rosario's final fixture of the Apertura, a 2–2 draw away to Independiente, by replacing Emiliano Vecchio. He scored for the first time on 24 November 2006 in the following season's Apertura in a 4–2 win at home over Quilmes, a minute after replacing Leonardo Borzani at half-time. After playing at the 2007 FIFA U-20 World Cup in Canada, Boca Juniors made a bid of US$6.5 million for him. He was also approached by English club Arsenal, a move that fell through due to the United Kingdom's strict rules on issuing work permits to players from outside the European Union.

=== Benfica ===
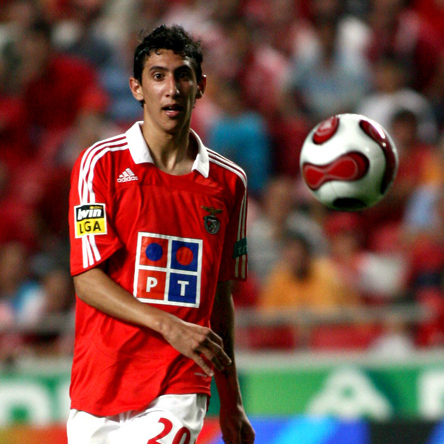
Di María playing for Benfica in 2007

Di María was transferred to the Portuguese side Benfica in July 2007, where he played as a winger. He was signed as a replacement for Benfica's departing captain, Simão, who joined Atlético Madrid earlier that summer. Benfica paid Rosario Central €6 million for 80% of his sports rights and 50% of the sports rights of Andrés Díaz. Later, in August 2008, the Portuguese club paid an extra €2 million for the remaining 20%, but re-sold 10% to GestiFute.

Di María had his breakthrough in the 2009–10 season thanks to the trust placed in him by manager Jorge Jesus. On 22 October, in the Europa League group stage match against Everton, he provided a hat-trick of assists for the first time in his career, in a 5–0 thrashing at the Estádio da Luz, marking the biggest loss of an English side in a European competition. During that month, Di María signed a new deal with Benfica, adding three more years to his current deal, which was to last until 30 June 2015 with his release fee set at a minimum of €40 million. Afterwards, he was backed by Diego Maradona to become "Argentina's next superstar". He would score a brace in Benfica's 2–1 home win over AEK Athens, to ensure Benfica's qualification to the round of thirty-two, as group winners.

On 27 February 2010, Di María scored his first hat-trick in a classic 4–0 win against Leixões. The next day, he made the headlines as "Magic Tri María" in all sports newspapers in Portugal. He finished as the league's top assister that season with 11 assists, including two in a 5–0 win against Olhanense, as Benfica won the national championship, adding the year's domestic League Cup, while being named Player of the Month in April.

=== Real Madrid ===
==== 2010–12: Debut season and La Liga win ====
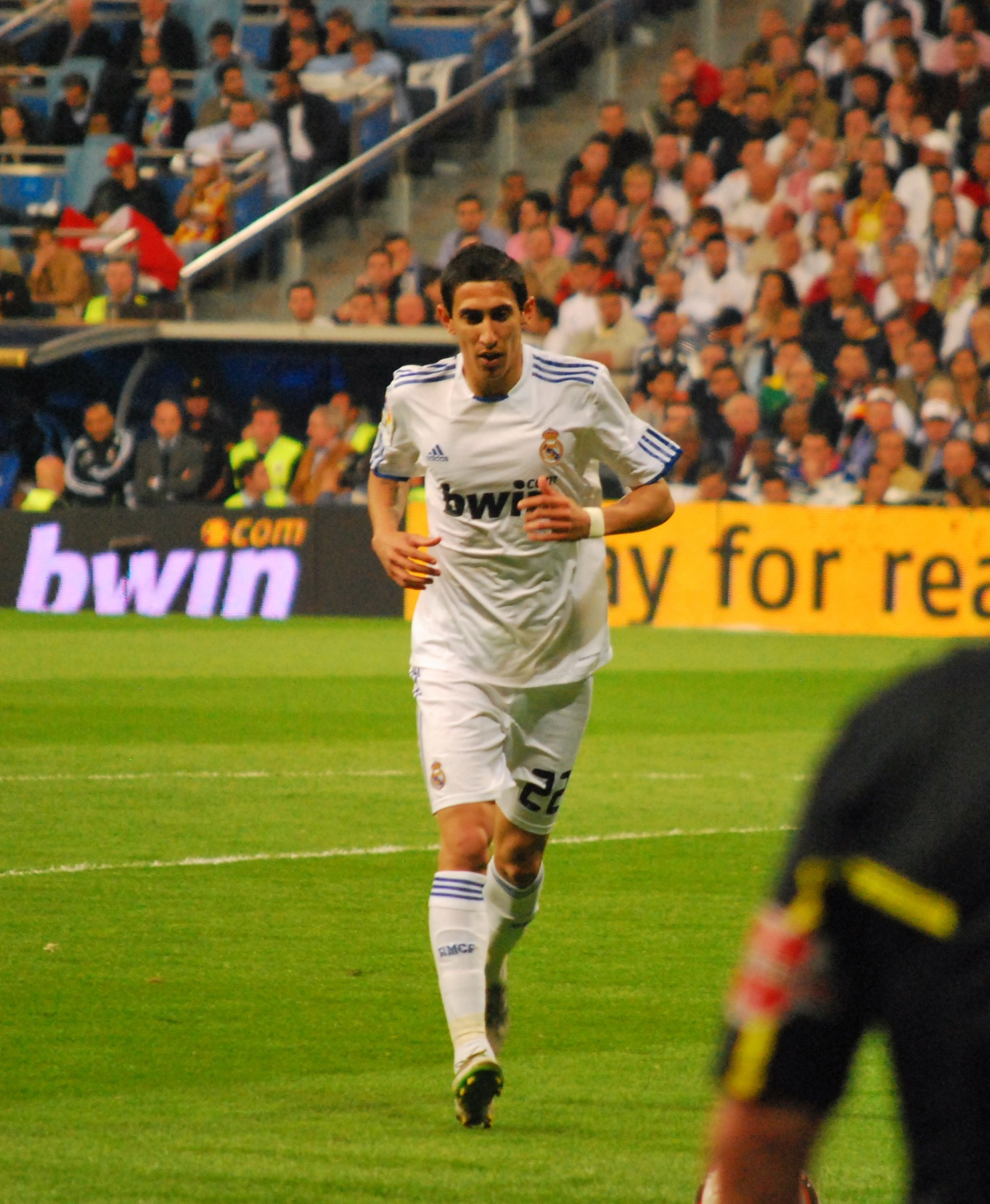
Di María against Barcelona in April 2011

On 28 June 2010, Real Madrid posted on their website that they had agreed with Benfica for the transfer of Di María. He signed a five-year contract for €25 million, plus €11 million in incentives, as announced one day later by the Portuguese Stock Exchange regulating entity. On 7 July 2010, Di María arrived to Madrid directly from Buenos Aires, and passed the medical test on 8 July. He made his debut on 4 August 2010 in a friendly match against Mexican side América, which Real Madrid won 3–2. On 22 August, Di María scored his first goal in another friendly away against Hércules, which Real Madrid won 3–1. In the last match of the pre-season, on 24 August, after an individual play described as a "magic moment", he opened the score of the 2–0 win against Peñarol for the Trofeo Santiago Bernabéu.

His league debut came on 29 August in a 0–0 draw against Mallorca. On 18 September, Di María scored his first league goal for Real Madrid in their 2–1 away win over Real Sociedad. Ten days later, he scored his first goal in the UEFA Champions League against Auxerre in a 1–0 victory. He scored a controversial first goal against Sevilla on 19 December. Days later, Di María assisted Karim Benzema's two goals and Cristiano Ronaldo's goal in an astonishing 8–0 drubbing of Levante on 22 December. In the second leg of the Champions League round of 16 against Lyon, he scored the third and final goal in a 3–0 win to send Real Madrid through to the quarter-finals for the first time in seven years.

Di María scored Real Madrid's third goal during their first-leg Champions League quarter-final victory over Tottenham Hotspur on 5 April 2011. On 20 April, he was sent off in the 31st minute of extra time in the Copa del Rey final against rival Barcelona. Real Madrid won the match 1–0, the lone goal of the match (in the 13th minute of extra time) being a header from Ronaldo, which came from his cross, thus obtaining his first honour with Real Madrid.

During the start of the 2011–12 season, Di María endured a tough series of matches as he struggled to adapt to the pace of the league following the summer break. As a result, Di María's early performance for the season was mixed with moments of genuinely good play interspersed with moments of sheer madness by the Argentine. This point was well illustrated during Real Madrid's 1–0 defeat to Levante, a match which saw a clearly out-of-sorts Di María commit a horror foul on Levante's Juanfran during the match. Di María caused the two teams to clash and an on-field incident ensued. However, Di María's performances would improve, including opening up a significant gap at the top of the assists table. From October 2011, Di María was being picked by Madrid head coach José Mourinho ahead of Kaká and Mesut Özil, a sign of his improving form.

On 27 November 2011, Di María played 60 minutes in a league match against city rivals Atlético Madrid, in which he scored a goal for Real Madrid. Mourinho's team won the match 4–1. On 3 December 2011, Di María scored Real's first goal from a sharp angle in a 3–0 defeat of Sporting de Gijón in La Liga. He was a constant threat and presence in the starting XI as Real Madrid won their 32nd league title, playing in their 3–0 win over Athletic Bilbao that clinched the league title.

==== 2012–14: La Décima and Copa del Rey title ====
Di María scored his first goal of the season against Barcelona in the first leg of the 2012 Supercopa de España at Camp Nou after a mistake by Barcelona goalkeeper Víctor Valdés. Although Di María did not have the best season, he did contribute in big moments, most notably by sending in the cross for Ronaldo's goal against Manchester United on 13 February, he registered seventeen assists, and scored nine goals throughout the season in 52 appearances, notably against Atlético Madrid and Málaga. On 9 August 2012, Di María signed a new contract with Real Madrid, keeping him at the club until 2018.

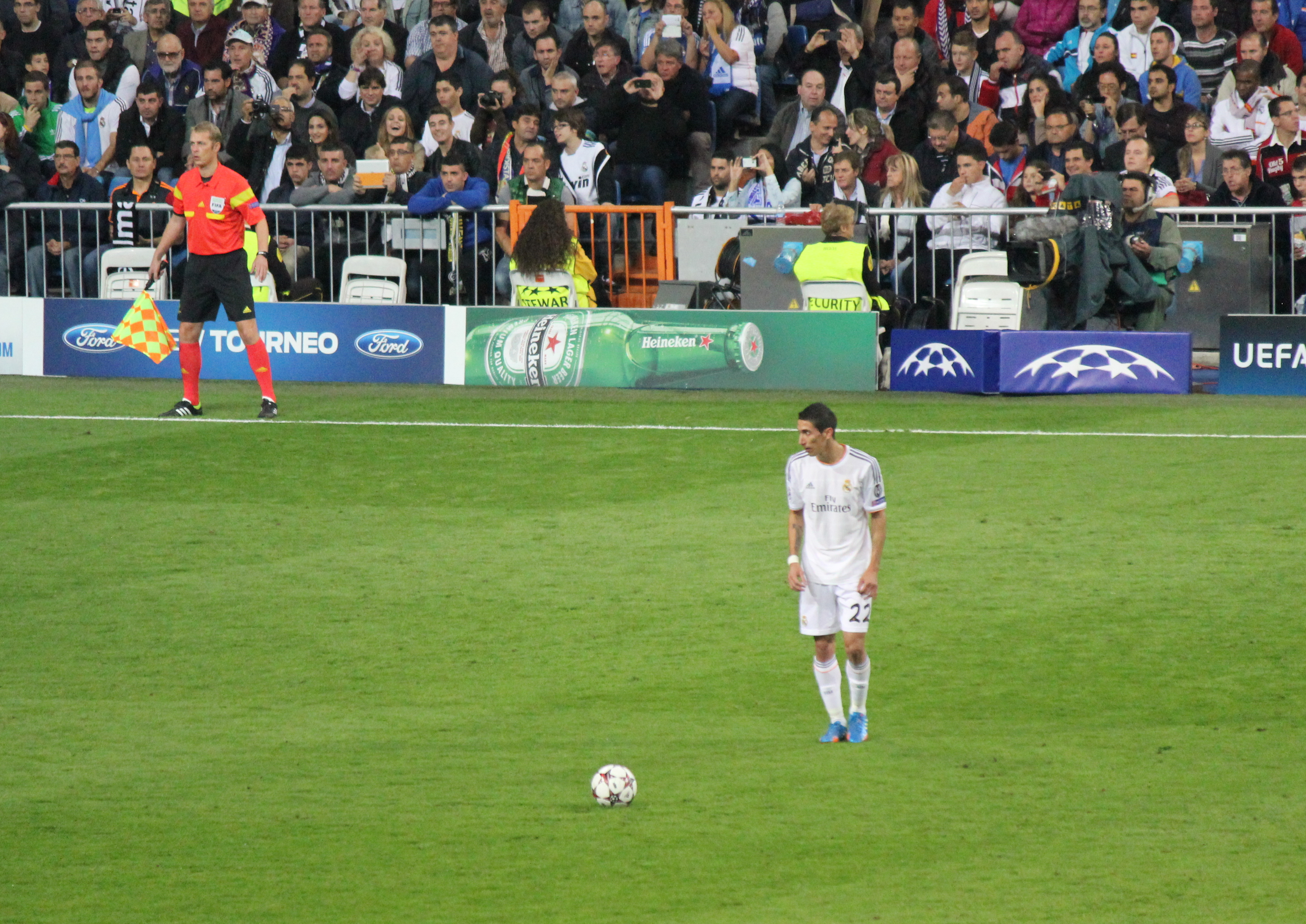
Di María preparing to take a free kick against Juventus in the UEFA Champions League in October 2013

On 2 October 2013, Di María scored two goals against Copenhagen in Real Madrid's 4–0 Champions League victory over them. Later in the season, due to tactical decisions by the club's new manager Carlo Ancelotti, Di María's playing position was permanently switched to that of an offensive–minded central midfielder, and he was frequently deployed in the starting line-up alongside Luka Modrić and Xabi Alonso in midfield in the team's 4–3–3 formation. He contributed to the club's 2–1 victory over Barcelona in the 2014 Copa del Rey Final with the opening goal. Di María was the top assist maker in La Liga for the season, contributing 17.

In the 2014 Champions League Final against Atlético Madrid on 24 May 2014, Di María dribbled past two players before producing a save from goalkeeper Thibaut Courtois. Di María's teammate Gareth Bale, was there to head the rebound into the net in the 110th minute, giving Real Madrid a 2–1 lead over Atlético in an eventual 4–1 win. Di María was named man of the match by UEFA after the match, and was presented with the honour by former Manchester United head coach Sir Alex Ferguson.

Di María was an unused substitute as Real Madrid won the 2014 UEFA Super Cup against Sevilla on 12 August. A week later, in the first leg of the Supercopa de España, he played the final 15 minutes of a 1–1 home draw against Atlético Madrid in place of Luka Modrić.

=== Manchester United ===
On 26 August 2014, Di María signed a five-year deal with Manchester United for a transfer fee of £59.7 million, one of the most expensive transfers of all time and the highest fee ever paid by a British club at the time. He inherited the number 7 shirt at United, which was previously worn by club legends such as George Best, Bryan Robson, Eric Cantona, David Beckham and Cristiano Ronaldo. However, he said in an open letter to Real Madrid fans that he had never wanted to leave Real Madrid, but that its board had been unsupportive and unfair: "Someone may not like me".

Di María made his debut on 30 August in a 0–0 draw with Burnley, in which he was substituted for Anderson after 70 minutes. He scored his first goal for United on 14 September, netting directly from a free-kick in a 4–0 win over Queens Park Rangers. He also provided an assist for Juan Mata's goal in the same match, winning the vote for Man of the Match. His performance was highlighted by Sky Sports' Player Cam feature, which was brought back especially for the match. In the next match, against Leicester City on 21 September, he again scored a goal and provided another assist, although United lost the match 5–3.

On 2 October, Di María won Manchester United's Player of the Month award for September after recording two goals and two assists in his first four matches for the club. One week later, he won his second individual trophy at United after his goal against Leicester, in which he chipped goalkeeper Kasper Schmeichel, was voted as the club's Goal of the Month for September. Di María continued his run of fine form on 5 October by scoring a goal and providing an assist for Radamel Falcao to help United defeat Everton 2–1. Di María was substituted with a hamstring injury 13 minutes into United's 3–0 defeat of Hull City on 29 November and made only one substitute appearance in the team's next seven matches.

On 4 January 2015, Di María returned from injury to score a late goal in a 2–0 win against Yeovil Town in the third round of the FA Cup. A week later, he was used as a forward by manager Louis van Gaal in a 1–0 home defeat to Southampton. This new role came in the midst of a bad run of form for Di María, who was said to have struggled since October. Di María was sent off on 9 March as United lost 2–1 at home against Arsenal in the FA Cup sixth round, being booked for diving and for grabbing the shirt of referee Michael Oliver, but earlier set up the equaliser by Wayne Rooney. At the season's end, Di María was judged by The Daily Telegraph to be the worst signing of the season.

=== Paris Saint-Germain ===
==== 2015–19: Transfer and domestic success ====
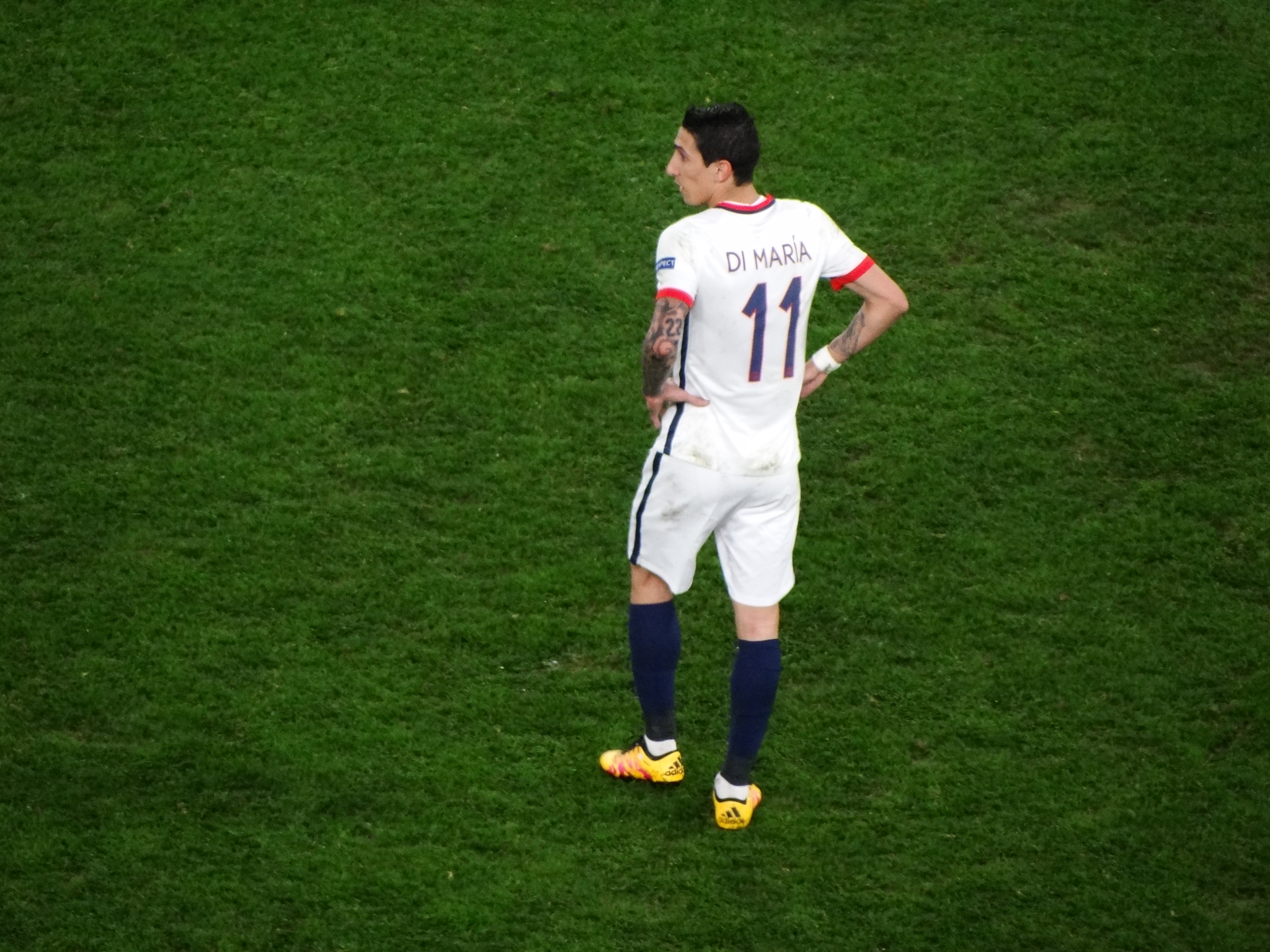
Di María with Paris Saint-Germain during the Champions League match against Chelsea in March 2016

On 25 July 2015, Di María failed to board a flight to the United States to join Manchester United's pre-season tour as scheduled; manager Louis van Gaal said he "did not know why". On 2 August, it was reported Di María would undergo a medical ahead of a move to Paris Saint-Germain; and four days later, Manchester United confirmed he had been sold to the French champions for an undisclosed fee, believed to be around £44 million, signing a four-year contract.

Di María made his Ligue 1 debut on 30 August away to Monaco as a 66th-minute substitute for Lucas, and assisted Ezequiel Lavezzi for the final goal of a 3–0 win at the Stade Louis II. On 15 September, Di María scored his first goal for PSG on his Champions League debut for the club, a 2–0 win over Malmö FF at the Parc des Princes. Seven days later, he registered his first goal in Ligue 1 as PSG defeated Guingamp 3–0. On 23 April 2016, Di María scored the winning goal for PSG in the 2016 Coupe de la Ligue Final against Lille at the Stade de France. Di María ended 2015–16 setting a new Ligue 1 record for assists in a season with 18.

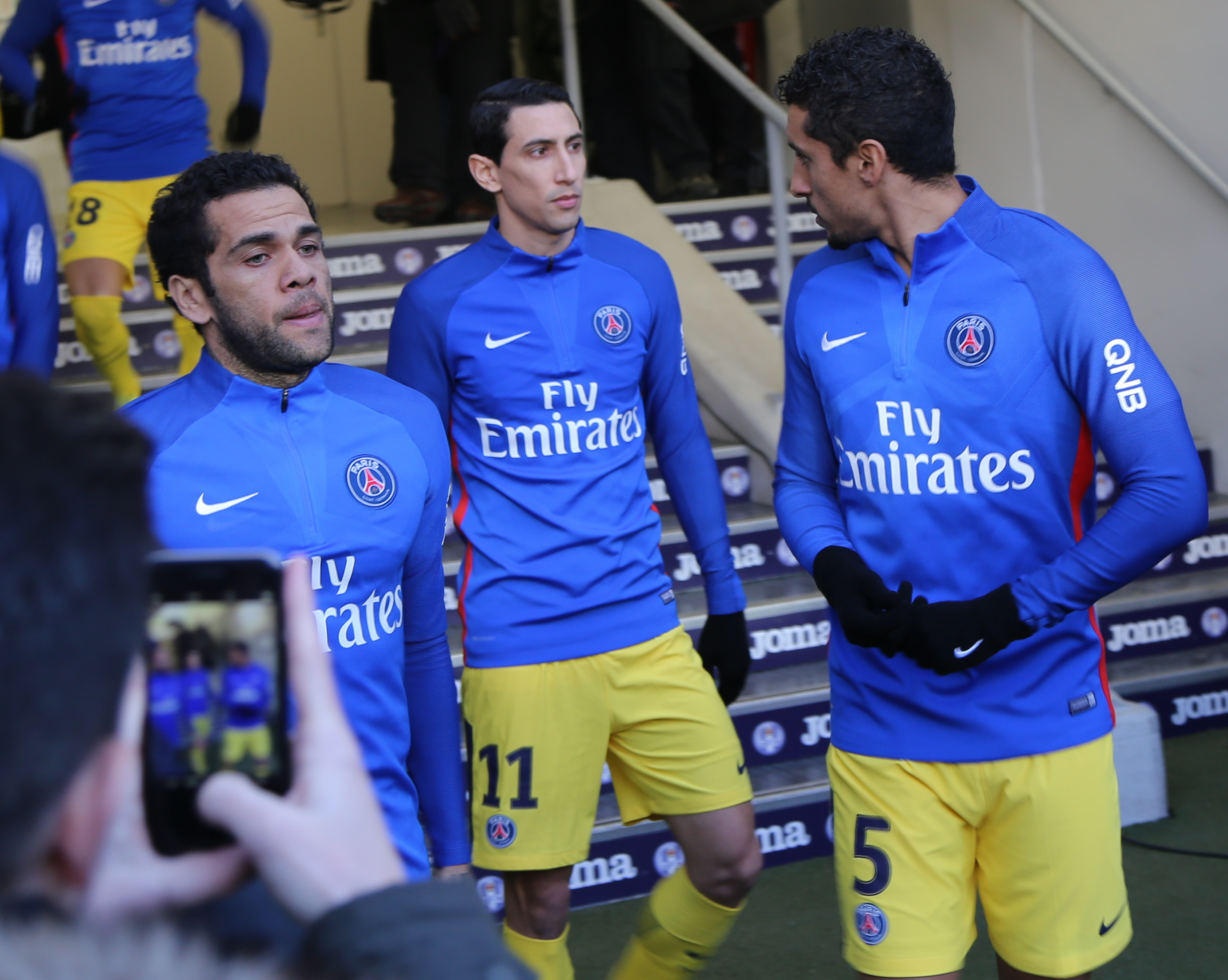
Di María (centre) with teammates Dani Alves (left) and Marquinhos (right) prior to a Ligue 1 match in February 2018

In the 2016–17 Champions League group stage home match against Basel on 19 October 2016, Di María scored the opening goal in the 40th minute in a 3–0 victory for PSG to register his first goal of the season. On 19 November, he opened the scoring with his first Ligue 1 goal of the season in a 2–0 home win against Nantes.

On 14 February 2017, Di María scored a brace as PSG defeated Barcelona 4–0 in the first leg of 2016–17 UEFA Champions League round of 16 at the Parc des Princes. On 1 April, he scored in PSG's 4–1 win over Monaco in the 2017 Coupe de la Ligue final. On 8 May 2018, he played as PSG won 2–0 against Les Herbiers to clinch the 2017–18 Coupe de France.

On the first leg of his side's Champions league round of 16 tie against his former club Manchester United in the 2018–19 season, Di María sustained a serious injury following a tackle from Ashley Young; however, he refused to be substituted, and in the final moments of the game, he assisted Kylian Mbappé's goal for a 2–0 win at Old Trafford. Eventually, PSG lost 3–1 in the second leg and were eliminated in the round of 16 for the third consecutive season.

==== 2019–2022: European final, assist record and departure ====
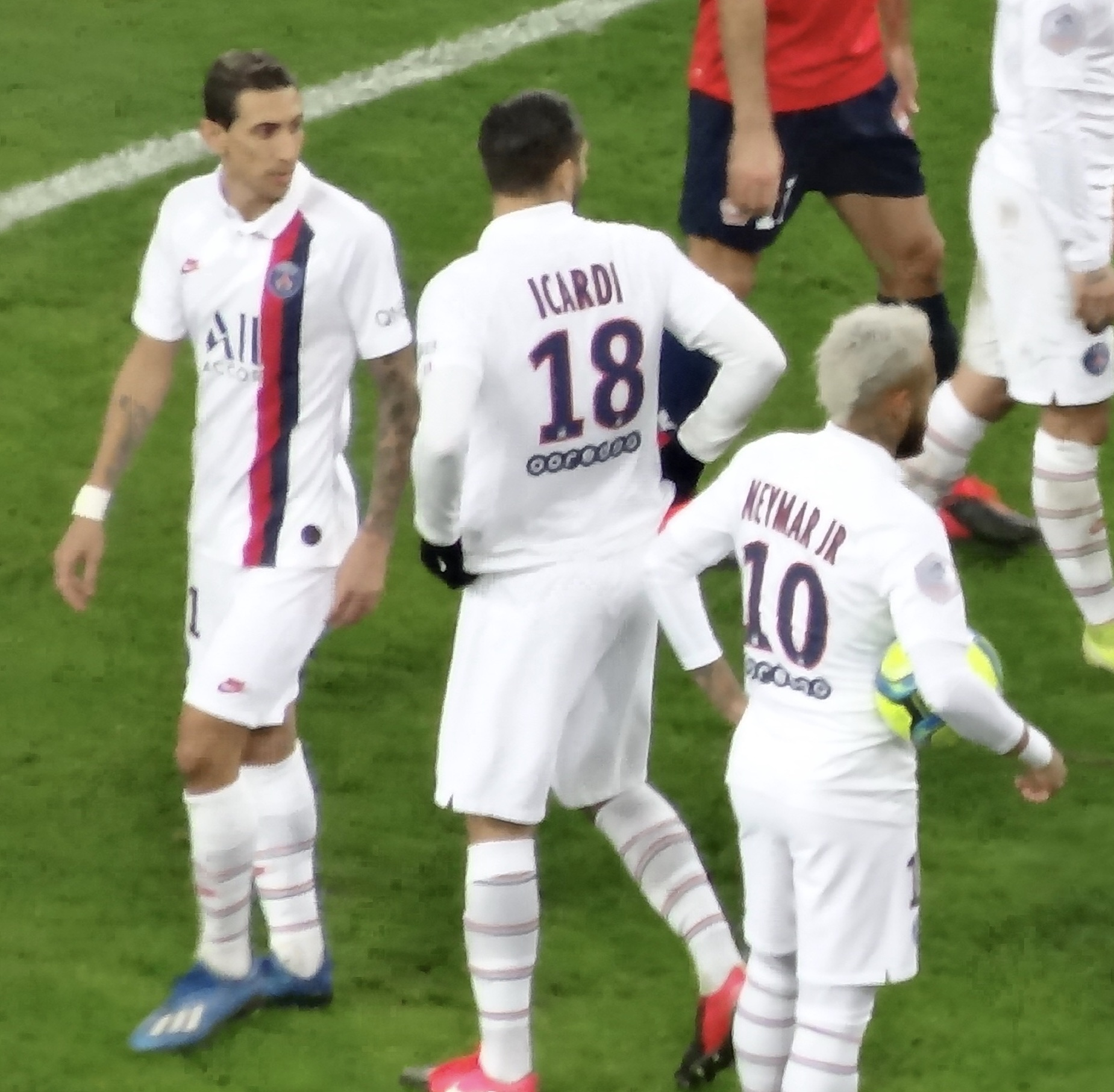
Di María (left) during a Ligue 1 match against Lille in January 2020

In the 2019–20 Champions League group stage, Di María scored a brace in a 3–0 win over his former club Real Madrid on 18 September 2019. On 18 August 2020, Di María scored a goal and recorded two assists in PSG's 3–0 Champions League semi-final victory over RB Leipzig; the club went on to play against Bayern Munich in the final, but lost the match 1–0.

On 23 September 2020, Di María was handed a four-match suspension for a spitting incident with Álvaro González during Le Classique 10 days earlier. He would miss the league matches against Angers, Nîmes, Dijon and Nantes. In a UEFA Champions League match against RB Leipzig on 4 November, Di María scored the opening goal in an eventual 2–1 defeat. He made his return to league action in a match against Rennes three days later, and scored a goal to help PSG win the match 3–0.

In a home match against İstanbul Başakşehir on 9 December 2020, Di María recorded two assists; he subsequently became the player with the third most assists in Champions League history with a tally of 32, only being behind Lionel Messi and Ronaldo. On 12 March 2021, Di María extended his contract with Paris Saint-Germain for one more season with an option for a second. On 4 May, Di María was sent off against Manchester City in the semi-finals of the Champions League for stamping on Fernandinho in an off the ball incident. He was handed a three-match ban in European competitions. In the 2021 Coupe de France Final, when PSG defeated Monaco by a score of 2–0, Di María broke the all-time assist record for PSG by delivering a pass for a Kylian Mbappé goal. It was his 104th assist as a PSG player.

In the 2021–22 season with Paris Saint-Germain, Di María won the Ligue 1 title, his fifth league title with the club. On 20 May 2022, his departure from Paris at the end of his contract was confirmed. In his last match for the club against Metz on 21 May, Di María scored a goal and recorded an assist, helping his team to a 5–0 win. He received a tribute and ovation from the Parc des Princes. Di María ended his spell at PSG with 92 goals and 112 assists in 295 matches.

=== Juventus ===
On 8 July 2022, Di María joined Juventus as a free agent after signing an annual contract. He made his club debut on 15 August, in Juventus's opening match of the Serie A season; he scored the opening goal and later assisted Dušan Vlahović's second goal in an eventual 3–0 home win but was substituted in the second half after sustaining an injury. On 15 September, he made his 100th Champions League appearance, and his debut with Juventus in that competition, in a 2–1 home defeat against his former club Benfica. On 5 October, Di María provided a hat-trick of assists in a 3–1 home win against Maccabi Haifa in the Champions League, making the third highest assist provider in the competition's history. Despite his contributions, Juventus finished third in the group stage which put them in the Europa League knockout round play-offs, and as a result, they failed to make the Champions League knockout stages for the first time since 2013.

On 23 February 2023, he scored a hat-trick in a 3–0 away win over Nantes in the Europa League. On 9 March, he scored his fourth goal in the competition, after netting the only goal of a home win over Freiburg. He impressed during the season, despite suffering from multiple hamstring injuries, which limited his game time. On 6 June, Di María confirmed his departure from Juventus, following the expiry of his contract.

=== Return to Benfica ===
Di María with Benfica in 2023

Amidst growing interest from Saudi clubs, Di María ended all speculations on 6 July 2023, when he signed a one-year contract with Benfica and was presented in front of 2,500 Benfica supporters in the entrance of Estádio da Luz.

On 9 August, Di María made his second debut at Benfica, scoring the opening goal of a 2–0 victory over Porto in the Supertaça Cândido de Oliveira, winning his first trophy back with the club. With two assists and a goal in a 4–0 win over Vitória de Guimarães on 2 September, he reached five goal contributions in his first four league games. On 29 September, he scored the only goal of a home win over Porto, in the Primeira Liga, allowing his side to stay on top of the league table. In the last Champions League group stage match on 12 December, Di María scored his first goal in the competition with Benfica, directly from a corner kick, in a 3–1 away win over Red Bull Salzburg, which proved essential for the Eagles to qualify to the UEFA Europa League knock-out round play-offs. There, he scored two penalties in a 2–1 aggregate victory over Toulouse. In the first leg of the quarter-finals against Olympique de Marseille on 11 April, he scored from open play to help his side to a 2–1 victory, but in the second leg, he missed the first kick of the penalty shootout as Benfica was knocked-out.

On 23 November 2024, the 36-year-old Di María scored a 16-minute hat-trick in the opening 18 minutes of the Portuguese Cup fourth round match against Estrela da Amadora, helping his team to a 7–0 victory. Two months later, on 11 January, he started in the 2025 Taça da Liga final against city rivals Sporting, converting his penalty in an eventual shoot-out victory. Di María scored four penalties in the 2025 FIFA Club World Cup, the first three against Boca Juniors and Auckland City in the group stage, while the fourth was a last-minute equaliser against Chelsea in the round of 16, which ended in a 4–1 loss in extra-time. This marked the end of his European career, after 768 official matches.

=== Return to Rosario Central ===
On 29 May 2025, it was announced by boyhood club Rosario Central that Di María would be returning on a free transfer after Benfica's participation in the 2025 FIFA Club World Cup. On 12 July, he made his first appearance since returning to the club, scoring a penalty in a 1–1 draw against Godoy Cruz. On 29 June 2026, Di María extended his contract with Rosario Central until June 2027.

== International career ==
=== 2007–2008: Success at youth level ===
In 2007, Di María was picked to play for the Argentina under-20 team. He was capped for the 2007 South American U-20 Championship in Paraguay. In 2007, he was called up for the 2007 FIFA U-20 World Cup in Canada. They went on to win the tournament with Di María scoring three goals in the process.

On 28 January 2008, Di María and some of his under-20s teammates were called up for the Argentina Olympic football team for the 2008 Summer Olympics. He scored the extra-time game-winning goal on a pass from Lionel Messi in the 105th minute of his team's 2–1 quarter-final win over the Netherlands. On 23 August, Di María scored the game-winner – a chip over the goalkeeper from the edge of the area – in the 57th minute of Argentina's 1–0 victory against Nigeria to capture their second-straight Olympic gold medal in the final game of the Olympic tournament.

=== 2008–2010: Senior debut and early national team career ===
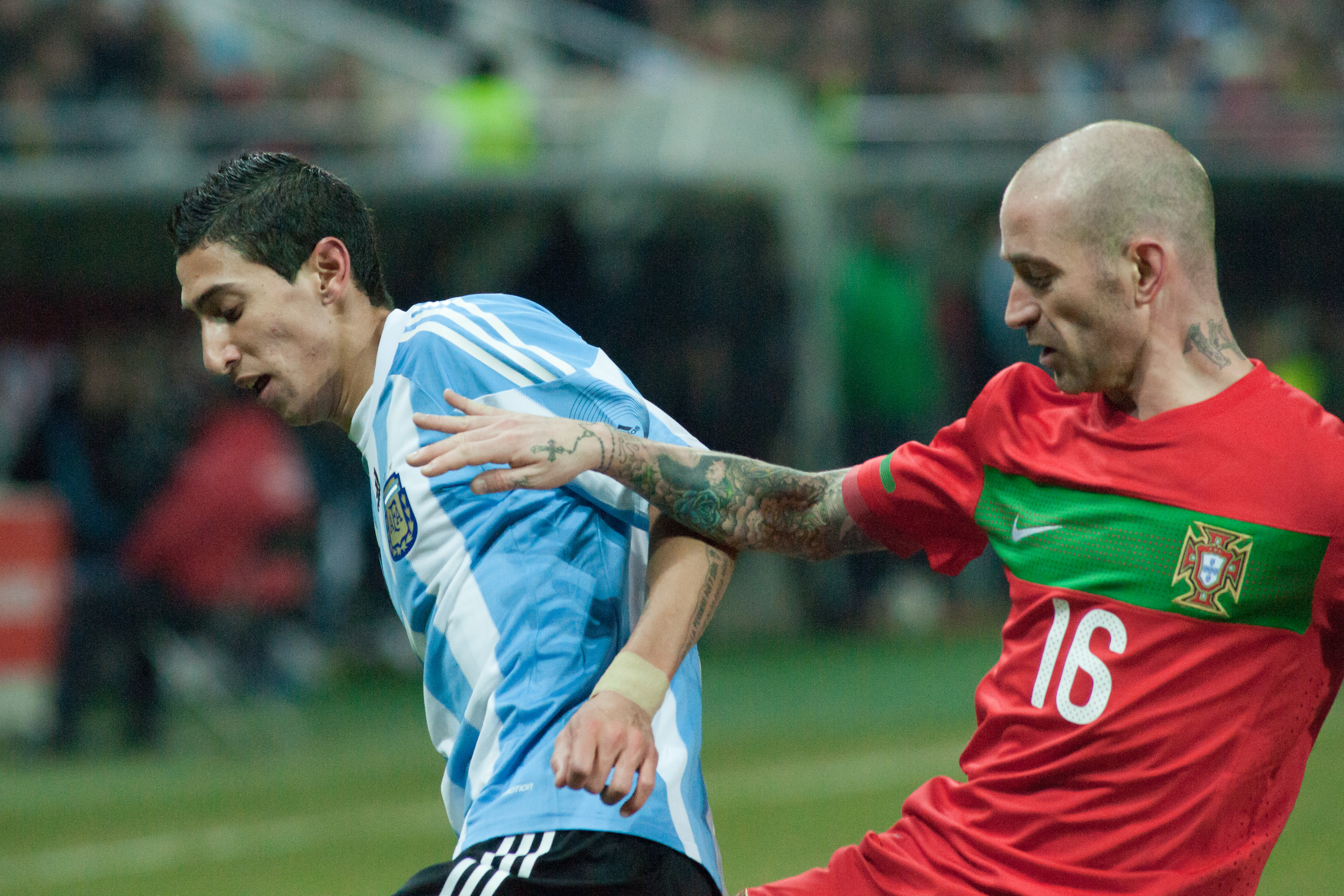
Di María (left) and Raul Meireles (right) battle for the ball during a friendly match between Argentina and Portugal in February 2011.

On 6 September 2008, Di María made his debut for the Argentina senior team in a match against Paraguay.

On 19 May 2010, Di María was selected by Argentinian manager Diego Maradona in the 23-man squad for the 2010 FIFA World Cup in South Africa. On 24 May, Di María scored his debut international goal in a 5–0 friendly win over Canada. At the World Cup, he helped Argentina reach the quarter-finals, playing in all five of Argentina's matches and starting four of them.

Following the World Cup, on 11 August 2010 Di María scored the first-ever international goal at Dublin's new Aviva Stadium in a friendly against the Republic of Ireland as Argentina won 1–0.

Di María appeared three times during the 2011 Copa América, scoring once in a 3–0 defeat of Costa Rica in the group stage.

=== 2011–2014: World Cup finals loss ===
Di María made 12 appearances during the 2014 FIFA World Cup qualification campaign and was included in the Argentina national team for the tournament finals. In Argentina's round of 16 match against Switzerland, Di María scored the only goal of the game after 118 minutes, from a Lionel Messi assist. During the quarter-final match against Belgium, Di María suffered a muscle tear in the thigh and was later taken off the field. It was later announced after the match that Di María would miss the rest of the tournament due to the injury. He had previously helped to create Gonzalo Higuaín's only goal of the match, which sent Argentina into the semi-finals. Argentina finished the tournament as runners-up to Germany.

On 11 July, Di María was named on the ten-man shortlist for FIFA's Golden Ball award for the tournament's best player.

On 3 September 2014, in a friendly away against world champions Germany, Di María had a part in all four of Argentina's goals in a 4–2 victory, assisting three and scoring one.

=== 2015–2020: Back-to-back Copa América finals losses and World Cup disappointment ===
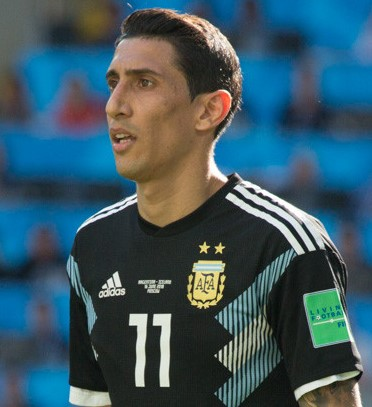
Di María for Argentina during the 2018 FIFA World Cup

On 28 May 2015, Di María was included in Argentina national team for the 2015 Copa América. On 6 June, he was selected to captain the team in the absence of Lionel Messi for a warm-up match against Bolivia, scoring twice in a 5–0 win. A week later, in their opening match of the tournament against Paraguay in La Serena, Di María won a penalty which Messi scored in a 2–2 draw. On 30 June, he scored twice and assisted a goal for Sergio Agüero, as Argentina defeated Paraguay 6–1 to reach the final. He was substituted with a hamstring injury within the first half-hour of the final against hosts Chile, which his team lost in a penalty shootout after a goalless draw.

In Argentina's opening match of the Copa América Centenario on 6 June 2016, a rematch of the previous tournament's final against defending champions Chile, Di María scored the opening goal of the match and later assisted Éver Banega's goal in a 2–1 win. Di María dedicated the goal to his grandmother, who had recently died. In his nation's second group match, against Panama on 10 June, he assisted Nicolás Otamendi's opening goal, but was later forced off due to injury. Argentina won the match 5–0. He missed the rest of the tournament due to injury as Argentina reached the Copa América final for the second consecutive time, once again losing out to Chile on penalties, following a 0–0 draw.

Di María made 18 appearances in the 2018 FIFA World Cup qualification campaign. On 22 May 2018, Di María was named in 23-man squad by manager Jorge Sampaoli for the 2018 FIFA World Cup in Russia. On 30 June, he scored a long range goal against France in a 4–3 defeat which saw Argentina eliminated from the World Cup in the Round of 16.

On 21 May 2019, he was included in the Lionel Scaloni final 23-man Argentina squad for the 2019 Copa América.

=== 2021–2024: Copa América, Finalissima, World Cup triumphs and retirement ===
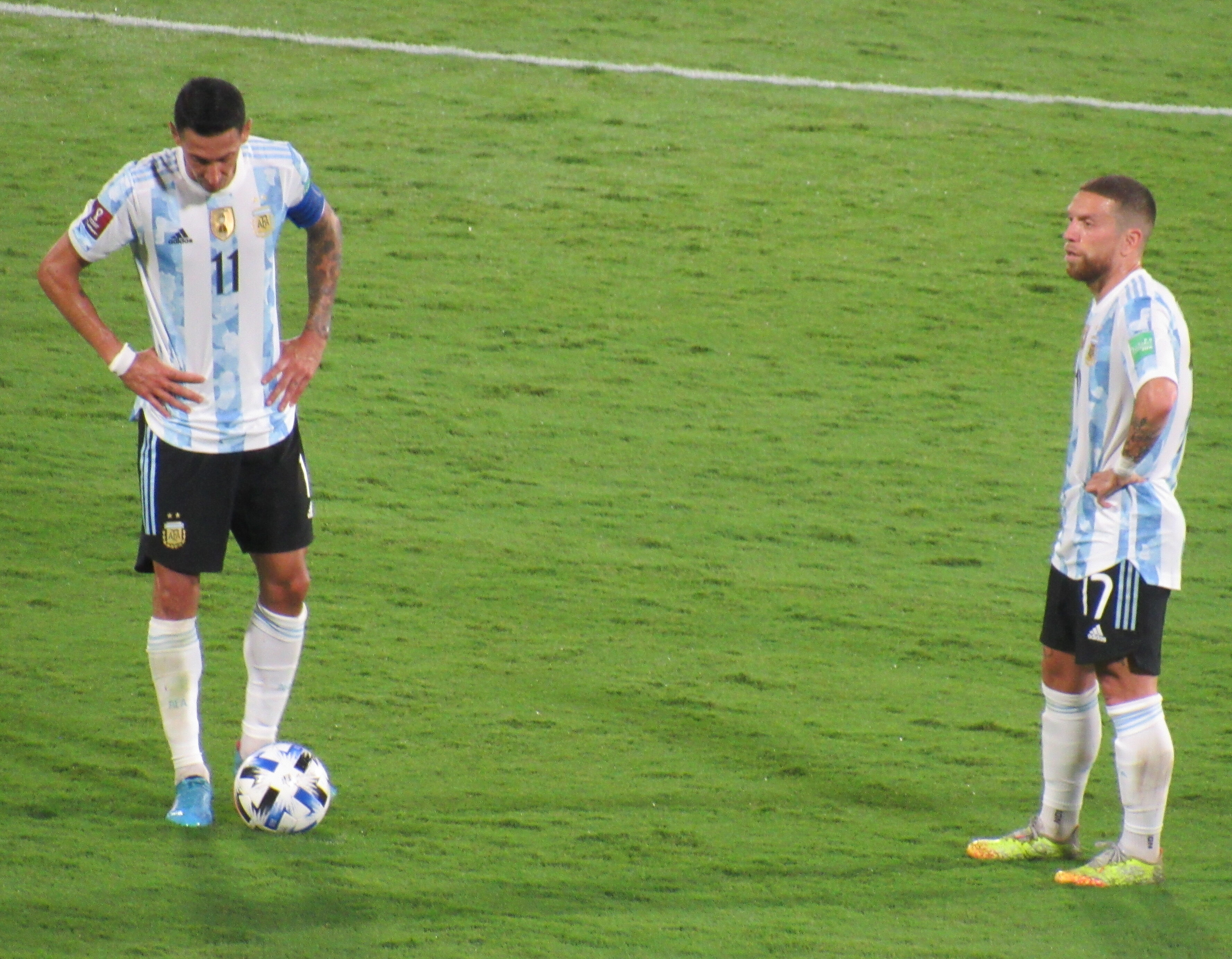
Di María (left) during the 2022 World Cup qualification match against Colombia in February 2022

In June 2021, Di María was included in the Argentina national team for the 2021 Copa América in Brazil. On 21 June, he assisted the only goal of the match, scored by Papu Gómez, in Argentina's third group match against Paraguay; the result allowed his side to progress to the quarter-finals. In the final of the tournament against the hosts Brazil on 10 July, he scored the only goal of the match to give Argentina their joint record 15th Copa América title with Uruguay and their first international title since 1993. He ran onto a long pass from Rodrigo De Paul into the Brazilian penalty area. The pass was slightly deflected by Brazilian defender Renan Lodi before Di María controlled the ball with the outside of his left foot; he then chipped the ball over the goalkeeper Ederson, giving Argentina an early lead. Although he was substituted late in the second half of the match, the goal would hold as the winning effort for Argentina.

On 1 June 2022, Di María scored Argentina's second goal in a 3–0 win over the reigning European champions, Italy, at Wembley Stadium in the 2022 Finalissima.

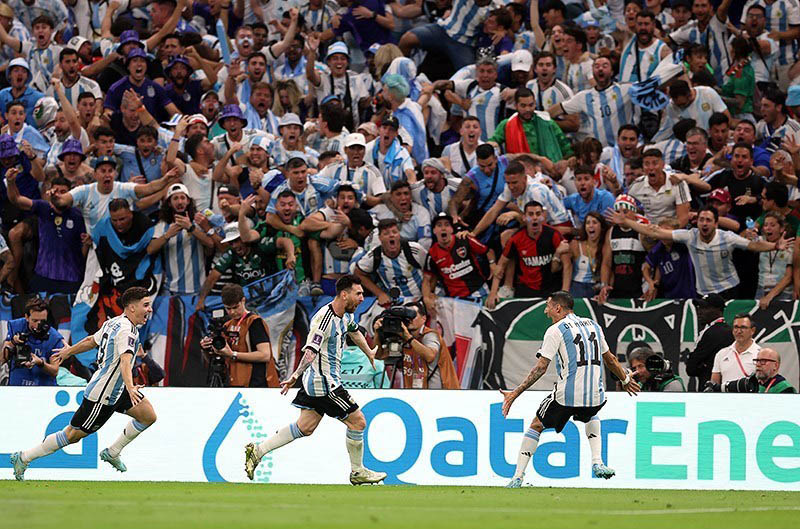
Di María (right) celebrating a goal at the 2022 World Cup against Mexico

On 11 November 2022, Di María was named in the final squad for the 2022 FIFA World Cup in Qatar. On 26 November, he recorded an assist on Messi's opening goal in Argentina's second group match, a 2–0 win over Mexico. On 18 December, Di María scored his team's second goal against France in the final, minutes after winning the penalty for the first goal as Argentina defeated France 4–2 on penalties, after the match ended 3–3 in extra-time, to win the World Cup. He was surprised by the coach's decision to start him on the left and thought Scaloni was "confused", but Scaloni convinced Di María how he wanted to game plan with him specifically on the left.

In October 2023, Di María announced that he would be retiring from the national team after the 2024 Copa América. In Argentina's final group match against Peru, he set-up Lautaro Martínez's first goal in a 2–0 win which saw Argentina advance to the quarter-finals after topping their group. In the final against Colombia, he wore the captain's armband after Messi went down with an injury in the 65th minute. He played 117 minutes before being taken off for Otamendi. Argentina won the match 1–0, marking their second consecutive Copa America triumph and third consecutive international tournament trophy. He was named as the man of the match for the final. It was Di María's final game for Argentina, ending his international career as a champion.

Di María retired joint-third in Argentina's all-time appearance list (145) and joint-sixth for most goals (31). On 5 September, he was honored by the national team at River Plate Stadium following Argentina's 3–0 win over Chile in a 2026 World Cup qualifier. Scaloni and the national team all donned special Argentina shirts wearing Di María's number 11 on the back, and he was thrown in the air by his teammates during the farewell ceremony. Messi, who was unable to attend due to nursing an injury, recorded a tribute to his long-time teammate that played on the stadium's screens. In a speech at the end of the ceremony, Di María commented "Now I'll be just another fan, cheering the team on from up there. I'll go to all the Copa Americas and World Cups. We will surely keep going this way because this team has a lot of guts."

== Style of play ==
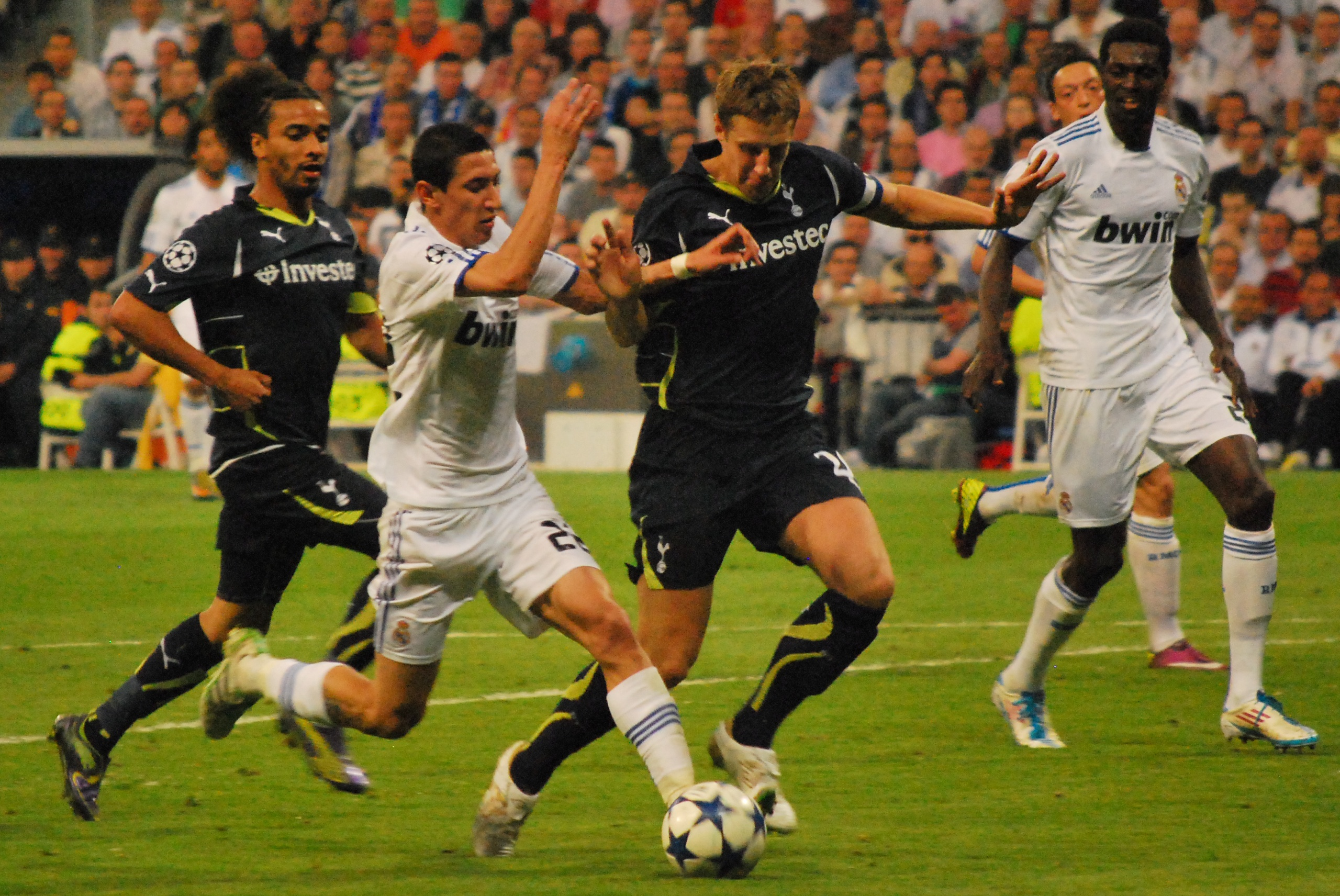
Di María taking on Tottenham Hotspur defenders in the Champions League in 2011

Di María has been describes by several publications and football figures as one of the best wingers and creative players of his generation, and as one of Argentina's notable players. He is predominantly left-footed and has played on either flank, as an attacking midfielder and occasionally, in central midfielder, including under Carlo Ancelotti at Real Madrid. Assessments of his playing style have highlighted his dribbling, ball control, pace, movement, stamina, passing, crossing, vision and set-piece delivery.

During his time at Real Madrid, Mourinho frequently deployed Di María on the right wing despite his preference for the left, while Di María himself noted that the role allowed him to cut inside and shoot while still rotating positions with Ronaldo. Ancelotti reinvented Di María as a central midfielder during Real Madrid's 2013–14 campaign, a tactical adjustment that proved instrumental in the club winning the Champions League. His stamina, versatility and work rate in the role were widely praised, with Ancelotti highlighting his ability to transform matches through his intensity. Despite his ability, however, Di María has often struggled with injuries throughout his career.

Managers, teammates and opponents have praised Di María's technical ability and intelligence. Ahead of the 2025 Club World Cup, Chelsea defender Levi Colwill described his technical ability as "crazy", while Benfica manager Bruno Lage highlighted his creativity, quality in transition and enduring influence despite his age. Former Real Madrid teammate Iker Casillas similarly praised Di María's versatility, intelligence and ability to decide matches on his own. Di María has also drawn praise in the media over his decisive performances in important matches throughout his career. He was named Man of the Match in the 2014 Champions League final after being focal in Real Madrid's comeback against Atlético Madrid, scored the winning goal in the 2021 Copa América final, and scored again in the 2022 World Cup final as Argentina became world champions. His performances in important matches have been widely credited as central to many of the biggest successes of both his clubs and the Argentina national team.

== Personal life ==
Di María is nicknamed "Fideo", which means "noodle" in Spanish, due to his slender frame. Due to his Italian ancestry, he obtained an Italian passport. He is Roman Catholic.

He married fellow Argentine Jorgelina (née Cardoso) in 2011. Together they have two daughters, Mia and Pia. Mia was born three months premature and survived after treatment at an intensive care unit at the Hospital Universitario Montepríncipe in Madrid.

Di María's home in Prestbury, Cheshire, was the scene of an attempted burglary on 31 January 2015.

On 2 September 2020, it was reported that Di María, along with PSG teammates Neymar and Leandro Paredes, had tested positive for COVID-19. The French sports newspaper L'Équipe said that the three players reportedly went on vacation in Ibiza. As a result, they had to quarantine for one week, and the rest of the players and working staff were scheduled to take a coronavirus test within the same week.

During a match between PSG and Nantes on 14 March 2021, Di María's home was robbed and his family was held hostage. He had been substituted off the pitch by manager Mauricio Pochettino, who informed Di María of the situation. PSG teammate Marquinhos' parents' home was also burgled in a similar way.

=== Pandora Papers ===
Di María is one of the 13 sports personalities named in the Pandora Papers published by the International Consortium of Investigative Journalists (ICIJ). He used a company in Panama to exploit his image rights for months before arriving at Real Madrid. He is the owner of a company in Panama created especially to manage his million-dollar contracts for the exploitation of his image rights, a shell company that he used since 2009 and that he maintains to this day. The Pandora Papers reveal that he handled more than €8 million between 2013 and 2017 through a company named Sunpex Corporation Inc.

== Career statistics ==
=== Club ===
As of match played 8 November 2026

Appearances and goals by club, season and competition
Club	Season	League			National cup (Note: Includes Taça de Portugal, Copa del Rey, FA Cup, Coupe de France, Coppa Italia)		League cup (Note: Includes Taça da Liga, Coupe de la Ligue)		Continental		Other		Total	
Club	Season	Division	Apps	Goals	Apps	Goals	Apps	Goals	Apps	Goals	Apps	Goals	Apps	Goals
Rosario Central	2005–06	Argentine Primera División	10	0	0	0	—		4 (Note: Appearances in Copa Libertadores)	0	0	0	14	0
Rosario Central	2006–07	Argentine Primera División	25	6	0	0	—		0	0	0	0	25	6
Rosario Central	Total		35	6	0	0	—		4	0	0	0	39	6
Benfica	2007–08	Primeira Liga	26	0	5	0	3	0	11 (Note: Seven appearances in UEFA Champions League, four appearances and one goal in UEFA Cup)	1	0	0	45	1
Benfica	2008–09	Primeira Liga	24	2	1	0	5	1	5 (Note: Appearances in UEFA Cup)	1	0	0	35	4
Benfica	2009–10	Primeira Liga	26	5	1	0	4	1	14 (Note: Appearances in UEFA Europa League)	4	0	0	45	10
Benfica	Total		76	7	7	0	12	2	30	6	0	0	125	15
Real Madrid	2010–11	La Liga	35	6	8	0	—		10 (Note: Appearances in UEFA Champions League)	3	0	0	53	9
Real Madrid	2011–12	La Liga	23	5	0	0	—		7	2	2 (Note: Appearance(s) in Supercopa de España)	0	32	7
Real Madrid	2012–13	La Liga	32	7	7	1	—		11	0	2	1	52	9
Real Madrid	2013–14	La Liga	34	4	7	4	—		11	3	0	0	52	11
Real Madrid	2014–15	La Liga	0	0	—		—		—		1	0	1	0
Real Madrid	Total		124	22	22	5	—		39	8	5	1	190	36
Manchester United	2014–15	Premier League	27	3	5	1	0	0	—		—		32	4
Paris Saint-Germain	2015–16	Ligue 1	29	10	4	0	4	2	10	3	0	0	47	15
Paris Saint-Germain	2016–17	Ligue 1	29	6	3	1	3	3	7	4	1 (Note: Appearance in Trophée des Champions)	0	43	14
Paris Saint-Germain	2017–18	Ligue 1	30	11	6	7	4	2	5	1	0	0	45	21
Paris Saint-Germain	2018–19	Ligue 1	30	12	4	3	2	0	8	2	1	2	45	19
Paris Saint-Germain	2019–20	Ligue 1	26	8	2	0	3	1	9	3	1	1	41	13
Paris Saint-Germain	2020–21	Ligue 1	27	4	5	0	—		10	1	1	0	43	5
Paris Saint-Germain	2021–22	Ligue 1	26	5	0	0	—		5	0	0	0	31	5
Paris Saint-Germain	Total		197	56	24	11	16	8	54	14	4	3	295	92
Juventus	2022–23	Serie A	26	4	4	0	—		10 (Note: Three appearances in UEFA Champions League, seven appearances and four goals in UEFA Europa League)	4	—		40	8
Benfica	2023–24	Primeira Liga	28	9	5	0	3	2	11 (Note: Five appearances and one goal in UEFA Champions League, six appearances and four goals in UEFA Europa League)	5	1 (Note: Appearance in Supertaça Cândido de Oliveira)	1	48	17
Benfica	2024–25	Primeira Liga	25	8	3	3	3	3	9	1	4 (Note: Appearances in FIFA Club World Cup)	4	44	19
Benfica	Total		53	17	8	3	6	5	20	6	5	5	92	36
Rosario Central	2025	Argentine Primera División	16	7	—		—		—		—		16	7
Rosario Central	2026	Argentine Primera División	28	11	2	0	—		7	2	1 (Note: Appearance in Supercopa Internacional)	2	38	15
Rosario Central	Total		44	18	2	0	—		7	2	1	2	54	22
Career total			573	133	72	20	34	15	164	40	14	10	867	219

=== International ===
Appearances and goals by national team and year
National team	Year	Apps	Goals
Argentina	2008	1	0
Argentina	2009	5	0
Argentina	2010	11	2
Argentina	2011	10	3
Argentina	2012	8	3
Argentina	2013	9	1
Argentina	2014	13	2
Argentina	2015	13	4
Argentina	2016	12	3
Argentina	2017	10	1
Argentina	2018	5	1
Argentina	2019	5	0
Argentina	2020	2	0
Argentina	2021	14	2
Argentina	2022	11	6
Argentina	2023	7	1
Argentina	2024	9	2
Total		145	31

Scores and results list Argentina's goal tally first, score column indicates score after each Di María goal.

List of international goals scored by Ángel Di María
No.	Date	Venue	Opponent	Score	Result	Competition
1	24 May 2010	Estadio Antonio Vespucio Liberti, Buenos Aires, Argentina	Canada	3–0	5–0	Friendly
2	11 August 2010	Aviva Stadium, Dublin, Ireland	Republic of Ireland	1–0	1–0	Friendly
3	9 February 2011	Stade de Genève, Carouge, Switzerland	Portugal	1–0	2–1	Friendly
4	11 July 2011	Estadio Mario Alberto Kempes, Córdoba, Argentina	Costa Rica	3–0	3–0	2011 Copa América
5	6 September 2011	Bangabandhu National Stadium, Dhaka, Bangladesh	Nigeria	2–0	3–1	Friendly
6	2 June 2012	Estadio Antonio Vespucio Liberti, Buenos Aires, Argentina	Ecuador	4–0	4–0	2014 FIFA World Cup qualification
7	15 August 2012	Commerzbank-Arena, Frankfurt am Main, Germany	Germany	3–0	3–1	Friendly
8	7 September 2012	Estadio Mario Alberto Kempes, Córdoba, Argentina	Paraguay	1–0	3–1	2014 FIFA World Cup qualification
9	10 September 2013	Estadio Defensores del Chaco, Asunción, Paraguay	Paraguay	1–0	5–2	2014 FIFA World Cup qualification
10	1 July 2014	Arena Corinthians, São Paulo, Brazil	Switzerland	1–0	1–0	2014 FIFA World Cup
11	3 September 2014	Esprit Arena, Düsseldorf, Germany	Germany	4–0	4–2	Friendly
12	6 June 2015	Estadio San Juan del Bicentenario, San Juan, Argentina	Bolivia	1–0	5–0	Friendly
13	6 June 2015	Estadio San Juan del Bicentenario, San Juan, Argentina	Bolivia	5–0	5–0	Friendly
14	30 June 2015	Estadio Municipal de Concepción, Concepción, Chile	Paraguay	3–1	6–1	2015 Copa América
15	30 June 2015	Estadio Municipal de Concepción, Concepción, Chile	Paraguay	4–1	6–1	2015 Copa América
16	24 March 2016	Estadio Nacional Julio Martínez Prádanos, Santiago, Chile	Chile	1–1	2–1	2018 FIFA World Cup qualification
17	6 June 2016	Levi's Stadium, Santa Clara, United States	Chile	1–0	2–1	Copa América Centenario
18	15 November 2016	Estadio San Juan del Bicentenario, San Juan, Argentina	Colombia	3–0	3–0	2018 FIFA World Cup qualification
19	13 June 2017	National Stadium, Kallang, Singapore	Singapore	6–0	6–0	Friendly
20	30 June 2018	Kazan Arena, Kazan, Russia	France	1–1	3–4	2018 FIFA World Cup
21	10 July 2021	Estádio do Maracanã, Rio de Janeiro, Brazil	Brazil	1–0	1–0	2021 Copa América
22	12 November 2021	Estadio Campeón del Siglo, Montevideo, Uruguay	Uruguay	1–0	1–0	2022 FIFA World Cup qualification
23	27 January 2022	Estadio Zorros del Desierto, Calama, Chile	Chile	1–0	2–1	2022 FIFA World Cup qualification
24	25 March 2022	La Bombonera, Buenos Aires, Argentina	Venezuela	2–0	3–0	2022 FIFA World Cup qualification
25	1 June 2022	Wembley Stadium, London, England	Italy	2–0	3–0	2022 Finalissima
26	16 November 2022	Mohammed bin Zayed Stadium, Abu Dhabi, United Arab Emirates	United Arab Emirates	2–0	5–0	Friendly
27	16 November 2022	Mohammed bin Zayed Stadium, Abu Dhabi, United Arab Emirates	United Arab Emirates	3–0	5–0	Friendly
28	18 December 2022	Lusail Iconic Stadium, Lusail, Qatar	France	2–0	3–3 (a.e.t.) (4–2 p)	2022 FIFA World Cup
29	28 March 2023	Estadio Único Madre de Ciudades, Santiago del Estero, Argentina	Curaçao	6–0	7–0	Friendly
30	26 March 2024	Los Angeles Memorial Coliseum, Los Angeles, United States	Costa Rica	1–1	3–1	Friendly
31	9 June 2024	Soldier Field, Chicago, United States	Ecuador	1–0	1–0	Friendly

== Honours ==
Benfica

- Primeira Liga: 2009–10
- Taça da Liga: 2008–09, 2009–10, 2024–25
- Supertaça Cândido de Oliveira: 2023

Real Madrid

- La Liga: 2011–12
- Copa del Rey: 2010–11, 2013–14
- Supercopa de España: 2012
- UEFA Champions League: 2013–14
- UEFA Super Cup: 2014

Paris Saint-Germain

- Ligue 1: 2015–16, 2017–18, 2018–19, 2019–20, 2021–22
- Coupe de France: 2015–16, 2016–17, 2017–18, 2019–20, 2020–21; runner-up: 2018–19
- Coupe de la Ligue: 2015–16, 2016–17, 2017–18, 2019–20
- Trophée des Champions: 2016, 2017, 2018, 2019, 2020
- UEFA Champions League runner-up: 2019–20

Rosario Central

- Primera División: 2025 Liga
- Supercopa Internacional: 2026

Argentina U20

- FIFA U-20 World Cup: 2007

Argentina Olympic

- Olympic Games: 2008

Argentina

- FIFA World Cup: 2022, runner up: 2014
- Copa América: 2021, 2024
- CONMEBOL–UEFA Cup of Champions: 2022

Individual

- Argentine Footballer of the Year: 2014, 2025
- FIFA FIFPro World11: 2014
- FIFA World Cup Dream Team: 2014
- IFFHS CONMEBOL Team of the Decade 2011–2020
- UEFA Team of the Year: 2014
- ESM Team of the Year: 2015–16, 2019–20
- UEFA Champions League Squad of the Season: 2013–14
- UEFA Champions League top assist provider: 2019–20
- UEFA Europa League top assist provider: 2009–10 (shared with Özil)
- Primeira Liga top assist provider: 2009–10
- La Liga top assist provider: 2013–14
- UEFALa Liga Team of the Year: 2010–11
- Ligue 1 top assist provider: 2015–16, 2019–20
- Coupe de France top scorer: 2017–18
- Coupe de la Ligue top assist provider: 2016–17
- SJPF Player of the Month: April 2010
- UNFP Ligue 1 Player of the Month: December 2015
- UNFP Ligue 1 Team of the Year: 2015–16, 2018–19
- Primeira Liga Player of the Month: November 2024
- Primeira Liga Forward of the Month: November 2024

== See also ==
- List of men's footballers with 1,000 or more official appearances
- List of men's footballers with 100 or more international caps
