= Romeu Ribeiro =

Portuguese footballer

Personal information
- Full name: Romeu Oliveira Ribeiro
- Date of birth: 13 January 1989 (age 37)
- Place of birth: Vieira do Minho, Portugal
- Height: 1.79 m (5 ft 10 in)
- Position: Defensive midfielder

Youth career
- 2000–2001: Vieira
- 2001–2004: Braga
- 2004–2007: Benfica

Senior career*
Years	Team	Apps	(Gls)
2007–2011	Benfica	5	(0)
2008–2009	→ Aves (loan)	39	(1)
2009–2010	→ Trofense (loan)	17	(1)
2010–2011	→ Marítimo B (loan)	23	(2)
2011–2013	Marítimo B	61	(10)
2013–2015	Penafiel	45	(0)
2015–2016	Académico Viseu	38	(0)
2016–2020	Penafiel	124	(2)
2020–2021	Casa Pia	18	(0)
2022–2023	Dumiense	23	(0)
Total		393	(16)

International career
2004–2005	Portugal U16	10	(0)
2005–2006	Portugal U17	12	(1)
2006–2007	Portugal U18	6	(0)
2007–2008	Portugal U19	13	(3)
2008–2009	Portugal U21	2	(0)
- * Club domestic league appearances and goals

Romeu Oliveira Ribeiro (born 13 January 1989) is a Portuguese former professional footballer who played as a defensive midfielder.

== Club career ==
Born in Vieira do Minho, Braga District, Ribeiro began his youth career with local S.C. Braga, being acquired by S.L. Benfica in 2004. Like Miguel Vítor, he first played with the main squad due to injuries to teammates, making his debut in the Primeira Liga and European competition in exactly the same matches that Vítor, in August 2007.

However, in January 2008, both players were loaned to second division side C.D. Aves. In August, the loan period was extended until June of the following year.

In July 2009, Ribeiro would be once again loaned, joining C.D. Trofense as it had just been relegated back to the second tier. In the following year, in the same situation, he signed for top-flight club C.S. Marítimo.

Ribeiro moved to Marítimo on a permanent basis in the summer of 2011, after his contract with Benfica expired. However, as manager Pedro Martins – and all his predecessors – preferred foreign players, especially Brazilians, he spent the vast majority of his three-year spell in Madeira with the reserves, in divisions three and two.

After being released on 30 June 2013, Ribeiro spent the vast majority of his career in the second division, the exception to this being the 2014–15 season in the main tier, with F.C. Penafiel (1,153 minutes of action, team relegation).

== Personal life ==
Ribeiro's father was a goalkeeper, whilst his younger brother Yuri also played for Benfica and Portugal at youth level.

== Career statistics ==
As of 15 May 2016

Club	Season	League			Cup		League Cup		Continental		Other		Total	
Club	Season	Division	Apps	Goals	Apps	Goals	Apps	Goals	Apps	Goals	Apps	Goals	Apps	Goals
Benfica	2007–08	Primeira Liga	5	0	0	0	0	0	2 (Note: Appearances in UEFA Champions League)	0	—		7	0
Aves (loan)	2007–08	Segunda Liga	7	0	1	0	0	0	—		—		8	0
Aves (loan)	2008–09	Segunda Liga	27	1	3	0	1	0	—		—		31	0
Aves (loan)	Total		34	1	4	0	1	0	—		—		39	1
Trofense (loan)	2009–10	Segunda Liga	17	1	0	0	5	0	—		—		22	1
Marítimo B (loan)	2010–11	Segunda Divisão	23	2	—		—		—		—		23	2
Marítimo B	2011–12	Segunda Divisão	28	8	—		—		—		—		28	8
Marítimo B	2012–13	Segunda Liga	33	2	—		—		—		—		33	2
Marítimo B	Total		84	12	—		—		—		—		84	12
Penafiel	2013–14	Segunda Liga	28	0	4	0	6	0	—		—		38	0
Penafiel	2014–15	Primeira Liga	17	0	2	0	1	0	—		—		20	0
Académico Viseu	2015–16	Segunda Liga	38	0	1	0	2	0	—		—		41	0
Career total			223	13	11	0	15	0	2	0	—		249	13
