= Marco Zoro =

Ivorian footballer (born 1983)

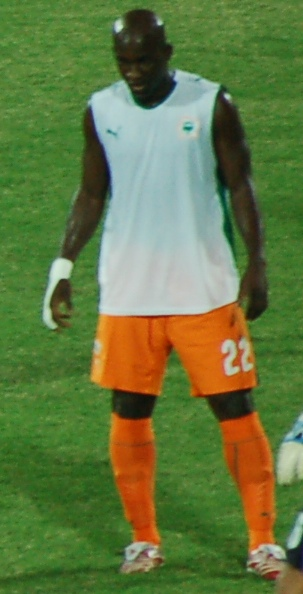
- Zoro with Ivory Coast in the 2008 CAN

Personal information
- Full name: Marc-André Zoro Kpolo
- Date of birth: 27 December 1983 (age 42)
- Place of birth: Anyama, Ivory Coast
- Height: 1.82 m (6 ft 0 in)
- Position: Centre back

Senior career*
Years	Team	Apps	(Gls)
1999–2002	Salernitana	55	(1)
2003–2007	Messina	116	(5)
2007–2011	Benfica	2	(1)
2008–2010	→ Vitória Setúbal (loan)	30	(0)
2011	→ Universitatea Craiova (loan)	14	(0)
2012–2013	Angers	32	(2)
2013–2014	OFI	27	(0)
2016–2017	Chania	3	(0)
2017	Asteras Amaliadas	6	(0)
Total		279	(9)

International career
2003–2010	Ivory Coast	22	(1)
- * Club domestic league appearances and goals

Marc-André "Marco" Zoro Kpolo (born 27 December 1983) is an Ivorian former professional footballer who played as a central defender.

== Club career ==
Born in Anyama, Zoro started his career in Italy, first with U.S. Salernitana 1919, without however making his Serie A debut. The next season, he played with the Campania team in the second division and, in January 2003, he joined Sicily's F.C. Messina Peloro, helping them achieve promotion in June; the club eventually signed him permanently, on a three-year deal.

Several months prior to the expiration of Zoro's deal with Messina, he and his agent Francis Kacou had been locked in talks for a contract extension. "For Zoro, his contract is coming up to expiration and there are difficulties in getting him to renew", said Messina president Pietro Franza in October 2006. "We will see over the coming days when we meet with his agent if we can find a possible understanding." Four months later, however, Zoro blasted, "I've read that some of the management won't talk to me about a new contract because they want to leave me hanging. I find this an insult to my professionalism. I have always trained hard and never let outside things influence me. I will also leave them hanging and see if the right club comes in for me." Two days later, he attempted to make amends: "When one of your family is treated poorly, it's normal for that person to be upset. I don't want to air our dirty linen in public. We'll talk about my contract at the end of the season. My priority right now is keeping Messina in Serie A."

On 15 May 2007, Zoro signed a four-year deal with Portuguese club S.L. Benfica, arriving for free. He would only feature in two Primeira Liga games throughout the entire campaign and eventually was made to train on his own, but scored once in a 2–2 home draw against U.D. Leiria on 9 March 2008. He was transfer-listed in August and, on 10 January 2009, underwent a five-day trial at Ewood Park with English Premier League side Blackburn Rovers; however, nothing came of it, and he was loaned until the end of the season to Vitória F.C. also in the Portuguese top flight– the arrangement was then extended for the entirety of 2009–10, and he was a regular starter as the Sadinos again barely avoided relegation.

In late January 2011, Zoro was loaned to FC Universitatea Craiova of the Romanian Liga I. In June, his link with Benfica expired and, on 30 January of the following year he signed a one-and-a-half-year contract with Angers SCO in the French Ligue 2.

=== Racist incidents ===
Zoro garnered heavy worldwide interest when, on 27 November 2005, he attempted to stop the Messina–Inter Milan match by leaving the field with the ball, after being tormented by racist taunts from some opposing supporters. He was eventually convinced to keep playing by other players, notably Adriano and Obafemi Martins; this then brought strong and unanimous condemnations by the whole football community within Italy, and a five-minute delay for an anti-racism display in all the matches to be played the next week in the country.

The actions of the Inter supporters were also brought to the attention of the European football governing body UEFA, as well as that of the European Union.

== International career ==
Zoro represented the Ivory Coast national team since 2003, and appeared at the 2006 Africa Cup of Nations (where the nation finished second) and the 2006 FIFA World Cup (no matches played). In the 2008 Africa Cup of Nations, he scored his first international goal, in a 3–0 win over Mali as the side eventually finished the tournament in fourth position.

=== International goals ===
No.	Date	Venue	Opponent	Score	Result	Competition
1	29 January 2008	Sports Stadium, Accra, Ghana	Mali	2–0	3–0	2008 Africa Cup of Nations

== Honours ==
Ivory Coast

- Africa Cup of Nations runner-up:2006
