= Andrés Díaz (Argentine footballer) =

Argentine footballer

Personal information
- Full name: Andrés Alejandro Díaz
- Date of birth: March 21, 1983 (age 43)
- Place of birth: Rosario, Argentina
- Height: 1.72 m (5 ft 8 in)
- Position: Midfielder

Youth career
- Rosario Central

Senior career*
Years	Team	Apps	(Gls)
2003–2007	Rosario Central	74	(3)
2007–2009	Benfica	1	(0)
2008	→ Banfield (loan)	7	(0)
2009–2010	→ Barcelona SC (loan)	2	(0)
2011	Deportes Concepción	13	(0)
Total		97	(3)
- * Club domestic league appearances and goals

Andrés Alejandro Díaz (born March 21, 1983) is a former Argentine footballer who played as a midfielder.

== Career ==
Díaz made his debut for Rosario Central in 2003. In July 2007 he signed with Benfica in a 6 million euro transfer that also involved his teammate Ángel Di María. Benfica would receive 50% future transfer fees of the player and other parties receive another 50%.

In 2008, he returned to Argentina, joining Banfield on an 18 months loan deal for the Clausura 2008 tournament On February 20, 2009 Barcelona Guayaquil have signed the Argentine midfielder on loan from Portuguese club S.L. Benfica. Diaz was previously on loan at Argentine club Banfield.

In 2010, he had a trial with Tigre.

In February 2011 he moved to Deportes Concepción of Chile.
