= 2007 Guadiana Trophy =

The 2007 Guadiana Trophy competition took place between 3-5 August 2007 and featured Benfica, Sporting Clube de Portugal, and Real Betis. Benfica won in the final against rivals Sporting.

== Matches ==
=== Day 1 ===
2007-08-03

Benfica (Portugal)	0 – 0	(Spain) Real Betis

Complexo Desportivo de Vila Real de Santo António, Vila Real de Santo António

=== Day 2 ===
2007-08-04

Sporting CP (Portugal)	1 – 1	(Spain) Real Betis
Liédson 66'		Capi 25'

Complexo Desportivo de Vila Real de Santo António, Vila Real de Santo António

=== Day 3 ===
2007-08-05

Benfica (Portugal)	1 – 0	(Portugal) Sporting CP
David Luiz 79'

Complexo Desportivo de Vila Real Santo de António, Vila Real de Santo António
