= Gilles Binya =

Cameroonian retired footballer (born 1984)

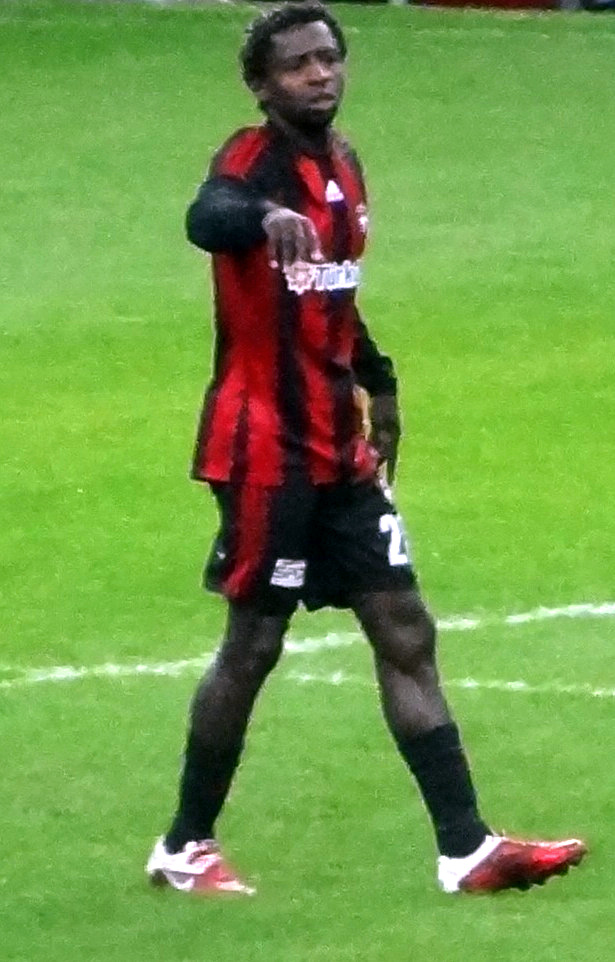
- Binya with Gaziantepspor in 2011

Personal information
- Full name: Gilles Augustin Binya
- Date of birth: 29 August 1984 (age 42)
- Place of birth: Yaoundé, Cameroon
- Height: 1.76 m (5 ft 9 in)
- Position: Midfielder

Youth career
- 2001: Nassara Yaoundé
- 2002: Constellacio Yaoundé
- 2003: Cotonsport Garoua

Senior career*
Years	Team	Apps	(Gls)
2003–2004	Tonnerre Yaoundé		
2004–2007	MC Oran	59	(2)
2007–2010	Benfica	23	(0)
2009–2010	→ Neuchâtel Xamax (loan)	19	(1)
2010–2012	Neuchâtel Xamax	32	(0)
2011–2012	→ Gaziantepspor (loan)	23	(0)
2012–2015	Gaziantepspor	64	(0)
2015–2017	Elazığspor	35	(0)
2017–2018	Alsancak Yeşilova	26	(0)
Total		281	(3)

International career
2007–2010	Cameroon	17	(0)
Medal record
Men's football
Representing Cameroon
Africa Cup of Nations
Runner-up	2008 Ghana
- * Club domestic league appearances and goals

Gilles Augustin Binya (born 29 August 1984) is a Cameroonian retired footballer who played as a defensive midfielder.

He spent most of his career in Turkey, representing Gaziantepspor and Elazığspor and appearing in 87 Süper Lig matches for the former club. He also competed professionally, other than in his own country, in Algeria, Portugal and Switzerland.

Binya won 17 caps for Cameroon, representing the country in two Africa Cup of Nations.

== Club career ==
Born in Yaoundé, Binya signed with S.L. Benfica for 2007–08 after spending three years at Algerian club MC Oran. At the beginning of the season the Portuguese planned to loan him to fellow Primeira Liga side C.F. Estrela da Amadora for a year, but with the substitution of manager Fernando Santos for José Antonio Camacho the deal was cancelled, and the player remained with Benfica.

While playing for the latter team in the UEFA Champions League in November 2007, Binya was shown a straight red card by referee Martin Hansson following a dangerous challenge on Celtic's Scott Brown. On 16 November 2007 UEFA gave him a six-match ban, meaning that he would play no further part in the remaining two Champions League group fixtures against A.C. Milan and FC Shakhtar Donetsk as well as the four following European matches.

Domestically, Binya finished the campaign with 16 league appearances, profiting from forced absences to first-choice holding midfielder, Portuguese international Petit. In 2008–09 he was used rarely, but still collected four yellow cards in only seven games (including two in a 0–2 loss at C.D. Trofense); at the season's closure he was deemed surplus to requirements, going on to serve a loan at Switzerland's Neuchâtel Xamax.

On 16 June 2010, Binya was signed by Neuchâtel on a three-year contract. In August of the following year, he was loaned to Gaziantepspor in the Süper Lig, with the move being made permanent subsequently.

== International career ==
Binya was first called up to the Cameroon national team in October 2007, by national manager Otto Pfister. Subsequently, he went on to represent his country at the 2008 Africa Cup of Nations, where Cameroon finished second to Egypt – Pfister was also the team's coach.

== Honours ==
Cameroon

- African Cup of Nations: runner-up, 2008
