= Yoni (footballer) =

Spanish footballer

Personal information
- Full name: Yonathan David Rodríguez Auyanet
- Date of birth: 19 March 1979 (age 47)
- Place of birth: Las Palmas, Spain
- Height: 1.79 m (5 ft 10 in)
- Position: Forward

Youth career
- Tenerife

Senior career*
Years	Team	Apps	(Gls)
1999–2001	O Elvas		
2001–2003	Odivelas	72	(14)
2003–2004	Pájara Playas	21	(1)
2004–2005	San Isidro		
2005–2006	Estoril	12	(4)
2006	Gáldar		
2007	Estrela Amadora	13	(1)
2008	Pandurii	0	(0)
2008–2011	Vecindario	89	(22)
2011–2012	San Pedro Mártir	?	(1)
2012	Vecindario		
- * Club domestic league appearances and goals

Yonathan David Rodríguez Auyanet, commonly known as Yoni (born 19 March 1979), is a Spanish former footballer who played as a forward.
