= Mateus Borges =

Brazilian footballer

Personal information
- Full name: Mateus Garcia Borges
- Date of birth: 25 June 1983 (age 43)
- Place of birth: Ribeirão Preto, Brazil
- Height: 1.72 m (5 ft 7 1/2 in)
- Position: Attacking midfielder

Team information
- Current team: Taubaté

Youth career
- Botafogo-SP

Senior career*
Years	Team	Apps	(Gls)
2001	Botafogo-SP	16	(1)
2002–2005	São Caetano	45	(5)
2005	→ Vitória (loan)		
2006	Náutico		
2007	Sertãozinho		
2007–2008	Estrela Amadora	29	(4)
2008–2009	Vitória Setúbal	18	(2)
2010	Canedense		
2010	Goiás	0	(0)
2010–2011	Vila Nova	6	(0)
2011–2012	Olhanense	18	(1)
2013	Atlético Sorocaba	6	(0)
2014	Pelotas	0	(0)
2014–2015	Comercial-SP	22	(1)
2016–	Taubaté	11	(1)
- * Club domestic league appearances and goals as of 4 October 2016

Mateus Garcia Borges (born 25 June 1983), known as Mateus Borges or simply Mateus, is a Brazilian footballer who plays as an attacking midfielder for Taubaté.
