= List of Primeira Liga hat-tricks =

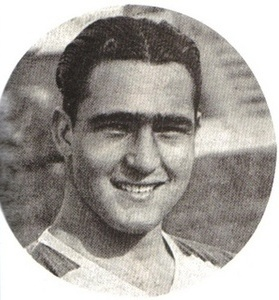
Fernando Peyroteo scored the most hat-tricks in the Primeira Liga, netting 44 for Sporting CP. He also holds the record for most goals in a single match, with nine.

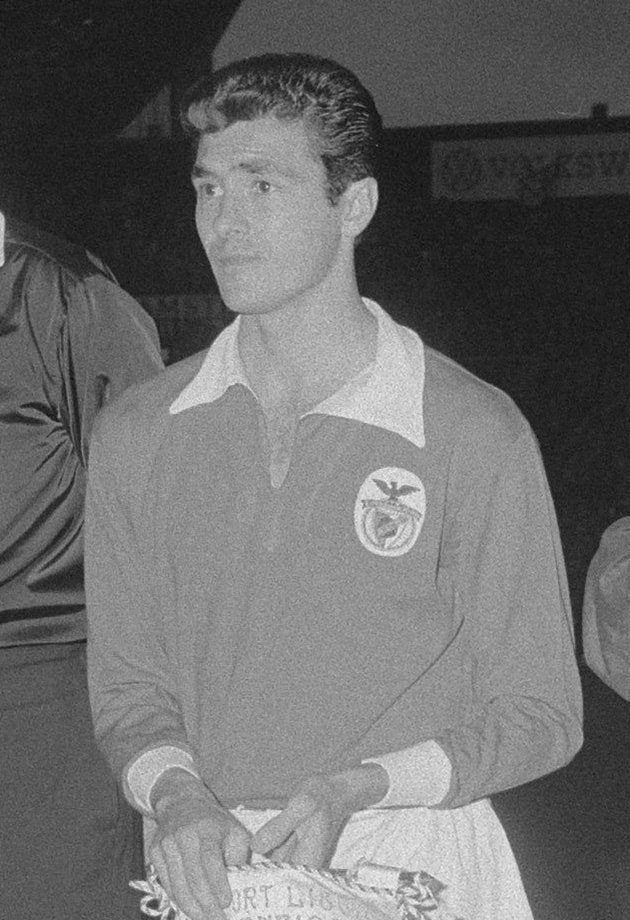
José Águas scored 26 hat-tricks, all for Benfica.

This article displays a list of Primeira Liga hat-tricks. The goals scored represent players who have scored three goals (a hat-trick) or more in a single league match in Portugal's top football division. The players displayed in the article who have scored hat-tricks are listed from the 1985–86 Primeira Divisão season onwards.

Since the 1934–35 season, more than one hundred players have scored hat-tricks in Portugal's top division. Twenty-six players have scored more than three goals in a match; of these, José Águas, Eusébio and Fernando Gomes have scored six goals; Patalino, Artur Jorge, Nené, Héctor Yazalde, Manuel Fernandes, Rui Jordão, Ricky, Mário Jardel, Nuno Gomes and Barata have scored five; Patalino (four times), José Torres, Vítor Baptista, Folha, Djão, Mats Magnusson, Domingos Paciência, Jorge Cadete, Fary Faye, Derlei, Liédson Carlos Bueno, Bas Dost, Edinho and Viktor Gyökeres have scored four.

Fernando Peyroteo scored three or more goals forty-four times in the Primeira Liga, more than any other player. Fernando Gomes is second with thirty-one hat-tricks; Eusébio scored twenty-nine. Eusébio holds the record for the most hat-tricks scored in a single season, with six in the 1972–73 Primeira Liga. Fernando Gomes holds the record for the quickest Primeira Liga hat-trick, netting three times against Farense in seven minutes on 29 May 1988.

The fixture between Benfica and Alcobaça, at Estádio da Luz in 1983, saw Diamantino and Nené respectively score a hat-trick and a poker for the home team. In 1997, Nuno Gomes and Jimmy Floyd Hasselbaink both scored a hat-trick for Boavista against Gil Vicente. In 1998, Campomaiorense's Demétrius and Sporting CP's Paulo Alves both scored hat-tricks in a match that Sporting won 5–3.

Twenty-two players have each scored hat-tricks for two different clubs: Patalino (O Elvas and Lusit. Évora), Rui Águas, Vítor Baptista, Paulinho Cascavel, César, José Costa, Derlei, Diamantino, Edgar, Edinho, Fernando Gomes, Nuno Gomes, Mário Jardel, Rui Jordão, Jorge Andrade, Lima, Albert Meyong, António Oliveira, Elpídio Silva, João Tomás, José Torres, and Paulinho. Six players have each scored hat-tricks for three different clubs: Vítor Baptista (Vitória de Setúbal, Benfica and Boavista), Nélson Fernandes (Varzim, Benfica and Sporting CP), Manuel Fernandes (CUF Barreiro, Sporting CP and Vitória de Setúbal), Jorge Silva (Amora, Boavista and Benfica), Edmílson (Salgueiros, Porto and Sporting CP) and Edmilson Lucena (Nacional, Marítimo and Vitória de Guimarães).

Seven players – Eusébio, Fernando Gomes, Emil Kostadinov, Mário Jardel, Óscar Cardozo, Bas Dost and Darwin Núñez – have scored hat-tricks in consecutive league matches.

Four players have scored hat-tricks and still ended up on the losing side: Tito, Fernando, Demétrius and Albert Meyong. Ten players have scored hat-tricks in matches that ended in a draw: Chico Gordo, Manuel Fernandes, Rui Jordão, Marlon Brandão, Ricky, Henry Antchouet, Buba Yohanna, Lito, Pizzi, Mario Rondón and Guilherme Schettine.

Fernando Gomes, Rosário, Herivelto, Rafael Jacques, Paulo Vida and Carlos Bueno have all scored hat-tricks as a substitute.

Artur Jorge, Eusébio, Jordão, Manuel Fernandes, João Vieira Pinto and Óscar Cardozo all scored hat-tricks in a Lisbon derby, Lemos, Rui Águas and Vangelis Pavlidis all scored hat-tricks in a Clássico, and António Oliveira, Jordão and Cristian Tello all scored hat-tricks in a match between Porto and Sporting CP.

== Hat-tricks ==
Key
^{4}	Player scored four goals
^{5}	Player scored five goals
^{6}	Player scored six goals
†	Player scored hat-trick as a substitute
^{D L}	Player was not on the winning team (game Drawn or Lost)
B	Team hat-trick scored for
()	Number of times player scored a hat-trick (only for players with multiple hat-tricks)
DF	Player played as a Defender
MF	Player played as a Midfielder
FW	Player played as a Forward

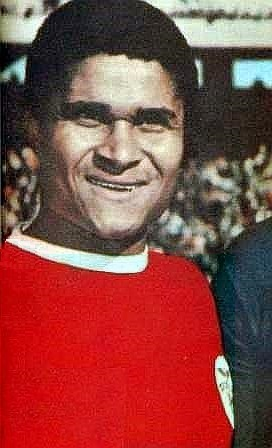
Eusébio scored 29 hat-tricks, all for Benfica.

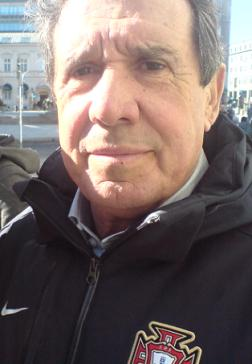
Humberto Coelho is one of five defenders to score a hat-trick.

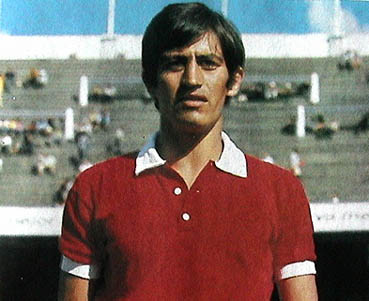
Héctor Yazalde scored ten hat-tricks.

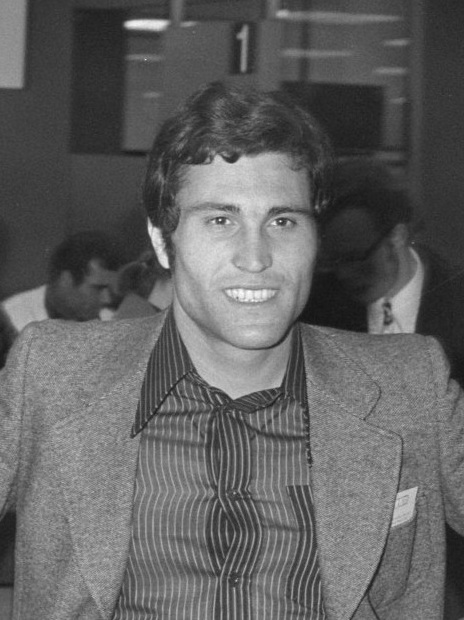
Vítor Baptista is one of six players to score a hat-trick for three different clubs.

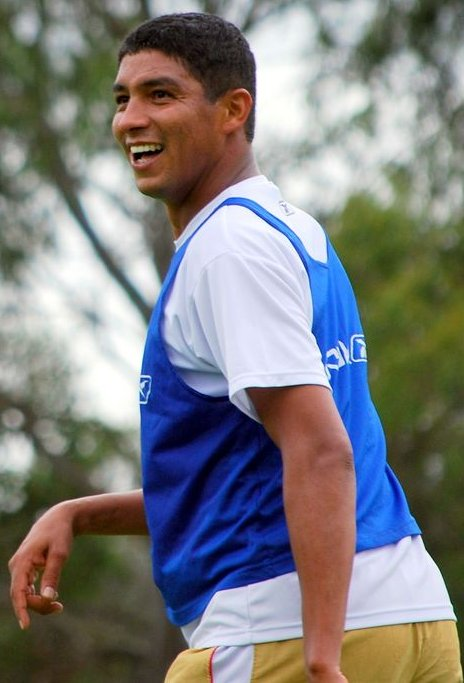
Mário Jardel scored ten hat-tricks with Porto and four with Sporting CP.

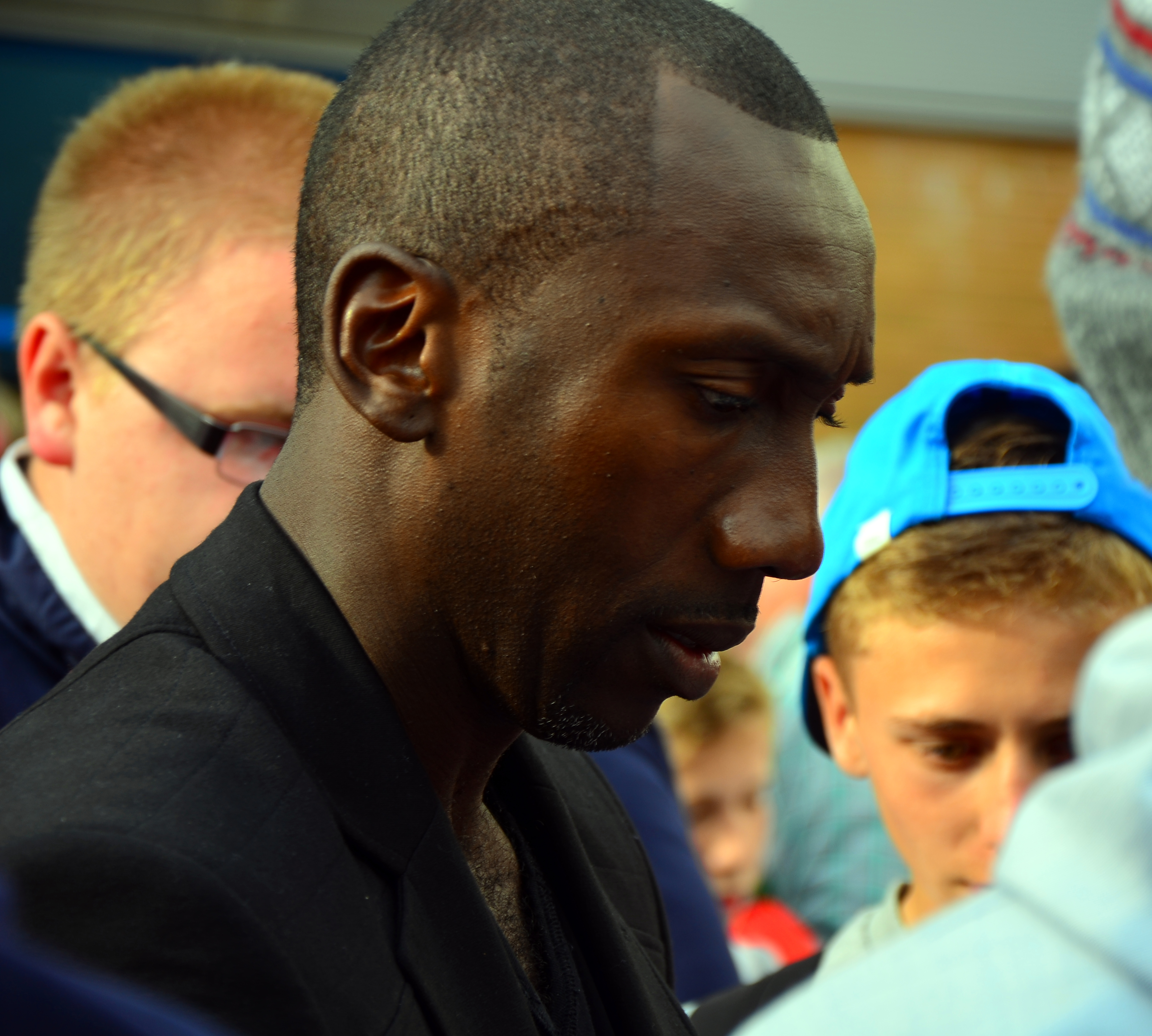
Jimmy Floyd Hasselbaink scored two hat-tricks in 1997.

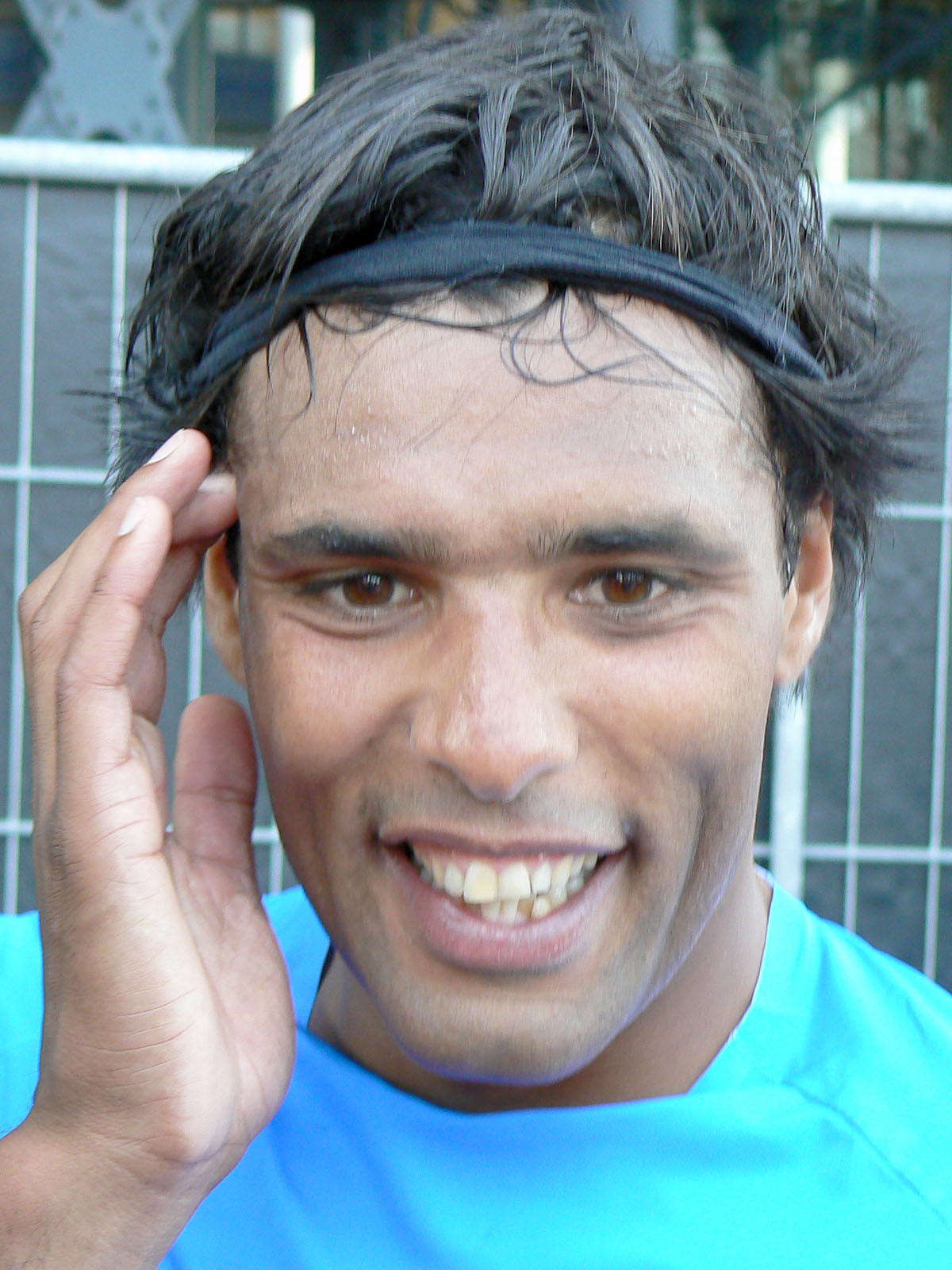
van Hooijdonk scored a hat-trick for Benfica in a 5–1 win against Desportivo das Aves.

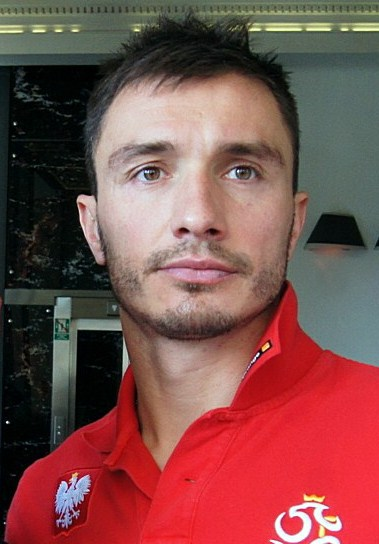
Marek Saganowski scored a hat-trick for Vitória de Guimarães in a 4–0 win against Vitória de Setúbal in 2006.

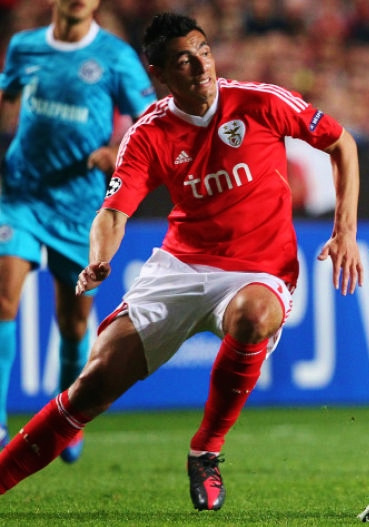
Óscar Cardozo scored six hat-tricks with Benfica.

Primeira Liga hat-tricks by player
Player	Nationality	Position	Home team	Result	Away team	Date	Ref.
Patalino (1)	Portugal	FW	SL Elvas	5–2	Vitória de Setúbal	31 March 1946	
Patalino (2)^{4}	Portugal	FW	SL Elvas	8–0	Sanjoanense	1 December 1946	
Patalino (3)^{5}	Portugal	FW	SL Elvas	8–1	Boavista	11 June 1947	
Patalino (4)^{4}	Portugal	FW	O Elvas	12–1	Académica	16 May 1948	
Patalino (5)^{4}	Portugal	FW	O Elvas	7–0	Atlético	9 January 1949	
Patalino (6)^{4}	Portugal	FW	O Elvas	6–1	Lusitano VRSA	16 April 1950	
Patalino (7)	Portugal	FW	Lusit. Évora	3–2	Braga	22 March 1953	
Caraça (1)	Portugal	FW	Lusit. Évora	4–3	Braga	5 February 1956	
Flora	Portugal	FW	Lusit. Évora	3–2	Porto	28 October 1956	
Batalha	Portugal	FW	Lusit. Évora	4–1	Vitória de Setúbal	20 January 1957	
Caraça (2)	Portugal	FW	Lusit. Évora	5–2	Covilhã	1 March 1959	
Caraça (3)	Portugal	FW	Lusit. Évora	7–1	Torreense	5 October 1958	
Eusébio (1)^{4}	Portugal	FW	Benfica	8–1	Salgueiros	1 October 1961	
Tonho	Portugal	FW	Lusit. Évora	4–0	Leixões	1 October 1961	
José Águas (25)	Portugal	FW	Benfica	8–1	Salgueiros	1 October 1961	
Eusébio (2)	Portugal	FW	Benfica	8–1	Beira-Mar	20 May 1962	
José Águas (26)	Portugal	FW	Benfica	8–1	Beira-Mar	20 May 1962	
José Torres (1)^{4}	Portugal	FW	Benfica	6–0	Feirense	27 December 1962	
Eusébio (3)^{4}	Portugal	FW	Feirense	1–6	Benfica	31 March 1963	
José Torres (2)^{4}	Portugal	FW	Benfica	6–2	Vitória de Guimarães	7 April 1963	
Eusébio (4)^{4}	Portugal	FW	Benfica	8–1	Barreirense	5 May 1963	
José Torres (3)	Portugal	FW	Vitória de Setúbal	2–4	Benfica	19 January 1964	
Eusébio (5)^{6}	Portugal	FW	Benfica	10–0	Seixal	2 February 1964	
Eusébio (6)	Portugal	FW	Benfica	8–0	Barreirense	16 February 1964	
José Torres (4)	Portugal	FW	Leixões	1–5	Benfica	12 April 1964	
Nélson Fernandes (1)	Portugal	FW	Varzim	3–1	Sporting CP	1 November 1964	
Eusébio (7)^{4}	Portugal	FW	Benfica	7–0	Braga	22 November 1964	
José Torres (5)	Portugal	FW	Benfica	6–0	Torreense	6 December 1964	
Eusébio (8)	Portugal	FW	Benfica	4–0	Vitória de Guimarães	10 January 1965	
Nélson Fernandes (2)	Portugal	FW	Varzim	6–1	Seixal	17 January 1965	
José Torres (6)	Portugal	FW	Benfica	5–0	Leixões	7 February 1965	
José Pedro Biléu	Portugal	FW	Lusit. Évora	6–0	Torreense	7 March 1965	
José Torres (7)	Portugal	FW	Benfica	5–0	Varzim	28 March 1965	
Eusébio (9)	Portugal	FW	Benfica	6–1	CUF	19 September 1965	
José Torres (8)	Portugal	FW	Benfica	8–2	Barreirense	28 November 1965	
António Simões	Portugal	FW	Lusit. Évora	6-1	Braga	13 February 1966	
Eusébio (10)	Portugal	FW	Benfica	5–0	Beira-Mar	20 February 1966	
Artur Jorge (1)	Portugal	FW	Académica de Coimbra	5–3	Sanjoanense	16 October 1966	
Artur Jorge (2)	Portugal	FW	Académica de Coimbra	3–0	Vitória de Setúbal	20 November 1966	
José Torres (9)	Portugal	FW	Benfica	7–0	Vitória de Guimarães	6 February 1967	
Eusébio (11)	Portugal	FW	Benfica	6–2	Varzim	19 February 1967	
Eusébio (12)^{4}	Portugal	FW	Benfica	4–0	Braga	19 March 1967	
Artur Jorge (3)^{4}	Portugal	FW	Académica de Coimbra	6–0	Belenenses	2 April 1967	
Eusébio (13)	Portugal	FW	Beira-Mar	0–9	Benfica	7 May 1967	
Nélson Fernandes (3)	Portugal	FW	Beira-Mar	0–9	Benfica	7 May 1967	
Artur Jorge (4)	Portugal	FW	Tirsense	0–4	Académica de Coimbra	10 September 1967	
José Torres (10)	Portugal	FW	Benfica	6–0	Leixões	29 October 1967	
Marinho (1)	Portugal	FW	Sporting CP	6–0	Braga	29 October 1967	
Eusébio (14)^{4}	Portugal	FW	Sanjoanense	1–4	Benfica	10 December 1967	
Eusébio (15)	Portugal	FW	Vitória de Guimarães	0–4	Benfica	4 February 1968	
José Torres (11)	Portugal	FW	Benfica	8–2	Barreirense	11 February 1968	
Eusébio (16)^{4}	Portugal	FW	Benfica	8–2	Barreirense	11 February 1968	
Artur Jorge (5)	Portugal	FW	CUF	0–3	Académica de Coimbra	11 February 1968	
Eusébio (17)	Portugal	FW	Benfica	7–0	Belenenses	3 March 1968	
Eusébio (18)	Portugal	FW	Benfica	5–0	Tirsense	31 March 1968	
Artur Jorge (6)	Portugal	FW	Varzim	2–3	Académica de Coimbra	31 March 1968	
Eusébio (19)^{4}	Portugal	FW	Benfica	6–0	Sanjoanense	14 April 1968	
Eusébio (20)^{6}	Portugal	FW	Benfica	8–0	Varzim	12 May 1968	
José Torres (12)	Portugal	FW	Benfica	4–0	União de Tomar	22 December 1968	
José Torres (13)	Portugal	FW	Benfica	5–0	Braga	5 January 1969	
Eusébio (21)^{6}	Portugal	FW	Benfica	8–0	Boavista	25 October 1969	
Horácio (1)^{5}	Portugal	FW	Leixões	6–2	Boavista	14 December 1969	
Nélson Fernandes (4)	Portugal	FW	Sporting CP	5–1	Vitória de Guimarães	8 March 1970	
Lemos (1)	Portugal	FW	Boavista	4–1	Belenenses	8 March 1970	
Eusébio (22)^{6}	Portugal	FW	União de Tomar	0–4	Benfica	29 March 1970	
Manuel Fernandes (1)	Portugal	FW	CUF	7–1	Leixões	20 September 1970	
Artur Jorge (7)	Portugal	FW	Benfica	4–0	Boavista	26 September 1970	
Vítor Baptista (1)^{4}	Portugal	FW	Vitória de Setúbal	5–1	Boavista	18 October 1970	
Lemos (2)	Portugal	FW	Porto	4–2	Varzim	4 November 1970	
Vítor Baptista (2)	Portugal	FW	Vitória de Setúbal	6–1	Tirsense	15 November 1970	
Nélson Fernandes (5)	Portugal	FW	Sporting CP	8–0	Boavista	15 November 1970	
Artur Jorge (8)	Portugal	FW	Benfica	5–0	Leixões	22 November 1970	
Vítor Baptista (3)^{4}	Portugal	FW	Vitória de Setúbal	6–1	Farense	13 December 1970	
Artur Jorge (9)	Portugal	FW	Benfica	5–1	Sporting CP	27 December 1970	
Horácio (2)	Portugal	FW	Leixões	5–0	Varzim	2 May 1971	
Lemos (3)	Portugal	FW	Porto	4–0	Benfica	31 January 1971	
Artur Jorge (10)	Portugal	FW	Tirsense	0–3	Benfica	17 October 1971	
Vítor Baptista (4)^{4}	Portugal	FW	Benfica	5–1	Barreirense	28 November 1971	
Tito (1)^{L}	Portugal	FW	CUF	5–3	Vitória de Guimarães	28 November 1971	
Tito (2)^{4}	Portugal	FW	Vitória de Guimarães	7–1	Tirsense	19 December 1971	
Nené (1)	Portugal	FW	Atlético	1–5	Benfica	5 December 1971	
Héctor Yazalde (1)	Argentina	FW	Tirsense	3–5	Sporting CP	26 December 1971	
Artur Jorge (11)^{5}	Portugal	FW	Benfica	7–0	Tirsense	20 February 1972	
José Torres (14)	Portugal	FW	Vitória de Setúbal	4–0	Leixões	19 March 1972	
Eusébio (23)	Portugal	FW	Farense	2–5	Benfica	28 May 1972	
Eusébio (24)	Portugal	FW	Benfica	6–0	Leixões	9 September 1972	
Eusébio (25)	Portugal	FW	Benfica	9–0	Beira-Mar	24 September 1972	
Rui Jordão (1)	Portugal	FW	Benfica	9–0	Beira-Mar	24 September 1972	
Eusébio (26)^{4}	Portugal	FW	Benfica	4–1	Sporting CP	8 October 1972	
Eusébio (27)	Portugal	FW	Benfica	5–0	Belenenses	22 October 1972	
José Torres (15)	Portugal	FW	Vitória de Setúbal	5–0	Leixões	22 April 1973	
Eusébio (28)	Portugal	FW	Benfica	8–0	Vitória de Guimarães	13 May 1973	
Héctor Yazalde (2)	Argentina	FW	Barreirense	3–5	Sporting CP	20 May 1973	
Moinhos (1)	Portugal	FW	Boavista	3–1	União de Tomar	3 June 1973	
Eusébio (29)^{4}	Portugal	FW	Benfica	6–0	Montijo	10 June 1973	
Arnaldo Silva (1)	Portugal	MF	CUF	4–1	Beira-Mar	16 September 1973	
Duda (1)	Brazil	FW	Vitória de Setúbal	9–0	Olhanense	23 September 1973	
Héctor Yazalde (3)^{4}	Argentina	FW	Oriental	0–7	Sporting CP	7 October 1973	
Héctor Yazalde (4)^{5}	Argentina	FW	Sporting CP	8–0	Montijo	3 November 1973	
Duda (2)	Brazil	FW	Vitória de Setúbal	4–1	Boavista	21 October 1973	
Arnaldo Silva (2)	Portugal	MF	CUF	6–1	Olhanense	18 November 1973	
Nélson Fernandes (6)	Portugal	FW	Sporting CP	3–0	Vitória de Guimarães	25 November 1973	
Duda (3)	Brazil	FW	Vitória de Setúbal	6–2	Montijo	9 December 1973	
Marinho (2)	Portugal	FW	Sporting CP	5–2	Beira-Mar	9 December 1973	
Héctor Yazalde (5)	Argentina	FW	Sporting CP	6–1	Barreirense	29 December 1973	
Tito (3)	Portugal	FW	Vitória de Guimarães	5–0	Leixões	6 January 1974	
José Torres (16)	Portugal	FW	Vitória de Setúbal	3–0	Académica de Coimbra	13 January 1974	
Héctor Yazalde (6)^{5}	Argentina	FW	Sporting CP	8–0	Oriental	17 February 1974	
Héctor Yazalde (7)	Argentina	FW	Sporting CP	6–0	CUF	2 March 1974	
Mirobaldo	Brazil	FW	Farense	3–1	Olhanense	10 March 1974	
Horácio (3)	Portugal	FW	Leixões	4–0	Beira-Mar	17 March 1974	
Rui Jordão (2)^{4}	Portugal	FW	Olhanense	1–7	Benfica	5 May 1974	
Rui Jordão (3)	Portugal	FW	Farense	0–4	Benfica	15 September 1974	
Moinhos (2)	Portugal	FW	Benfica	4–0	Académica de Coimbra	6 October 1974	
Lemos (4)	Portugal	FW	Porto	4–1	Olhanense	6 October 1974	
Héctor Yazalde (8)^{4}	Argentina	FW	Sporting CP	6–1	Atlético	3 October 1974	
Lemos (5)	Portugal	FW	União de Tomar	2–5	Porto	1 December 1974	
Tito (4)	Portugal	FW	Farense	2–5	Vitória de Guimarães	15 December 1974	
Héctor Yazalde (9)^{5}	Argentina	FW	Sporting CP	7–0	Olhanense	4 January 1975	
Moinhos (3)	Portugal	FW	Benfica	4–0	Farense	12 January 1975	
António Oliveira (1)	Portugal	FW	Porto	4–0	Oriental	12 January 1975	
Héctor Yazalde (10)^{4}	Argentina	FW	Sporting CP	5–2	Leixões	1 March 1975	
Fernando Gomes (1)	Portugal	FW	Farense	1–6	Porto	30 March 1975	
Manuel Fernandes (2)^{4}	Portugal	FW	CUF	7–2	Olhanense	4 May 1975	
Fernando Gomes (2)†	Portugal	FW	Porto	6–1	União de Tomar	7 September 1975	
Nené (2)^{5}	Portugal	FW	Benfica	9–1	Leixões	21 September 1975	
Rui Jordão (4)	Portugal	FW	Benfica	5–0	Beira-Mar	5 October 1975	
Chico Gordo^{D}	Angola	FW	Braga	3–3	União de Tomar	12 October 1975	
Nené (3)	Portugal	FW	Farense	1–4	Benfica	26 October 1975	
Manuel Fernandes (3)	Portugal	FW	Sporting CP	4–1	União de Tomar	26 October 1975	
António Oliveira (2)	Portugal	FW	Porto	8–2	Leixões	1 November 1975	
Jacques (1)	Portugal	FW	Farense	5–1	Braga	2 November 1975	
Manuel Fernandes (4)	Portugal	FW	Sporting CP	4–1	Braga	14 December 1975	
Manuel Fernandes (5)	Portugal	FW	Sporting CP	3–0	Leixões	10 January 1976	
Teófilo Cubillas	Peru	FW	União de Tomar	0–5	Porto	11 January 1976	
Rui Jordão (5)	Portugal	FW	Benfica	6–1	União de Tomar	17 January 1976	
Rui Jordão (6)	Portugal	FW	Estoril	0–4	Benfica	13 March 1976	
Manuel Fernandes (6)^{D}	Portugal	FW	Sporting CP	3–3	Académica de Coimbra	13 March 1976	
Nené (4)	Portugal	FW	Benfica	7–1	Braga	21 March 1976	
Seninho	Portugal	FW	Atlético	0–4	Porto	4 April 1976	
Clésio	Brazil	FW	Estoril	3–2	Boavista	5 September 1976	
Horácio (4)	Portugal	FW	Varzim	7–2	Montijo	18 September 1976	
Fernando Gomes (3)^{6}	Portugal	FW	Porto	8–2	Atlético	24 October 1976	
Nené (5)	Portugal	FW	Benfica	3–0	Riopele	27 November 1976	
Formosinho	Portugal	FW	Atlético	2–5	Vitória de Setúbal	2 January 1977	
Celso Pita	Portugal	FW	Boavista	6–2	Atlético	9 January 1977	
Nené (6)^{4}	Portugal	FW	Benfica	6–0	Atlético	23 January 1977	
Duda (4)	Brazil	FW	Porto	7–0	Montijo	27 February 1977	
Fernando Gomes (4)	Portugal	FW	Porto	7–0	Montijo	27 February 1977	
Chico Bolota	Portugal	FW	Montijo	6–0	Atlético	6 March 1977	
António Oliveira (3)	Portugal	FW	Porto	4–1	Sporting CP	27 March 1977	
Nené (7)	Portugal	FW	Benfica	4–0	Beira-Mar	8 May 1977	
Fernando Gomes (5)^{4}	Portugal	FW	Porto	8–0	Belenenses	15 May 1977	
Rui Jordão (7)	Portugal	FW	Sporting CP	5–0	Braga	18 September 1977	
Duda (5)	Brazil	FW	Porto	6–1	Feirense	24 September 1977	
Vítor Baptista (5)	Portugal	FW	Benfica	6–0	Marítimo	20 November 1977	
Albertino	Angola	FW	Boavista	5–1	Estoril	26 November 1977	
António Oliveira (4)	Portugal	FW	Varzim	1–4	Porto	27 November 1977	
José Costa (1)	Portugal	MF	Académica de Coimbra	4–1	Marítimo	4 December 1977	
Chico Gordo	Angola	FW	Braga	6–1	Marítimo	18 December 1977	
Ademir Vieira (1)	Brazil	MF	Vitória de Setúbal	1–4	Porto	12 February 1978	
Fernando Gomes (6)	Portugal	FW	Porto	6–0	G.D. Riopele	19 March 1978	
Ademir Vieira (2)	Brazil	MF	Porto	6–0	Belenenses	9 April 1978	
Fernando Gomes (7)	Portugal	FW	Porto	5–1	Varzim	30 April 1978	
Fernando Gomes (8)	Portugal	FW	Porto	6–1	Académico de Viseu	23 December 1978	
Rui Jordão (8)	Portugal	FW	Sporting CP	3–0	Beira-Mar	3 March 1979	
Jorge Gomes	Brazil	FW	Boavista	5–0	Académico de Viseu	4 March 1979	
Nené (8)^{5}	Portugal	FW	Benfica	6–1	Académica de Coimbra	11 March 1979	
Fernando Gomes (9)	Portugal	FW	Famalicão	0–4	Porto	27 May 1979	
António Oliveira (5)	Portugal	FW	Porto	6–1	Beira-Mar	3 June 1979	
Fernando Gomes (10)^{4}	Portugal	FW	Académico de Viseu	0–5	Porto	10 June 1979	
Nené (9)	Portugal	FW	Benfica	5–0	Académico de Viseu	17 June 1979	
Nené (10)	Portugal	FW	Benfica	5–1	Vitória de Setúbal	29 August 1979	
José Costa (2)	Portugal	MF	Porto	6–0	Portimonense	1 September 1980	
Fernando Gomes (11)	Portugal	FW	Porto	3–1	Vitória de Setúbal	15 September 1979	
Rui Jordão (9)	Portugal	FW	Sporting CP	4–0	Sporting Espinho	29 September 1979	
Humberto Coelho	Portugal	DF	Benfica	4–1	Estoril	7 October 1979	
Vítor Baptista (6)	Portugal	FW	Boavista	5–1	Portimonense	11 November 1979	
Nené (11)	Portugal	FW	Benfica	4–0	Marítimo	5 January 1980	
Reinaldo	Portugal	FW	Benfica	8–0	Rio Ave	27 January 1980	
Nené (12)	Portugal	FW	Benfica	8–0	Rio Ave	27 January 1980	
Manoel Costa	Brazil	FW	Sporting CP	4–1	Marítimo	9 February 1980	
Nené (13)	Portugal	FW	Benfica	5–0	Beira-Mar	23 February 1980	
Mundinho	Brazil	FW	Portimonense	4–5	Vitória de Guimarães	24 February 1980	
Fernando Gomes (12)	Portugal	FW	Beira-Mar	0–4	Porto	23 March 1980	
César Oliveira	Brazil	FW	Benfica	8–0	Belenenses	30 March 1980	
Nené (14)^{4}	Portugal	FW	Benfica	8–0	Belenenses	30 March 1980	
Fernando Gomes (13)	Portugal	FW	União de Leiria	0–4	Porto	13 April 1980	
Nené (15)	Portugal	FW	Benfica	4–0	Varzim	20 April 1980	
Rui Jordão (10)^{5}	Portugal	FW	Sporting CP	5–0	Rio Ave	26 April 1980	
Fernando Meireles	Portugal	FW	Rio Ave	3–2	Varzim	11 May 1980	
Mirobaldo	Brazil	FW	Portimonense	3–1	Marítimo	18 May 1980	
Peter Barry	England	FW	Portimonense	5–1	Boavista	31 August 1980	
José Pedro	Angola	FW	Vitória de Setúbal	0–3	Marítimo	21 September 1980	
Folha (1)	Portugal	FW	Boavista	3–0	Marítimo	18 October 1981	
Jorge Silva (1)	Portugal	FW	Amora	6–0	Académica de Coimbra	2 November 1980	
José Costa (3)	Portugal	MF	Porto	6–3	Amora	9 November 1980	
Folha (2)^{4}	Portugal	FW	Boavista	4–0	Académica de Coimbra	7 February 1981	
César Oliveira	Brazil	FW	Benfica	5–1	Vitória de Setúbal	24 May 1981	
Rui Jordão (11)	Portugal	FW	Sporting CP	6–0	Penafiel	19 September 1981	
Fernando Festas	Portugal	DF	Vitória de Guimarães	4–0	Amora	1 November 1981	
Luís Norton de Matos	Portugal	FW	Portimonense	5–1	Belenenses	29 November 1981	
José Abrantes	Portugal	FW	Estoril	4–2	Vitória de Setúbal	30 January 1982	
Rui Jordão (12)	Portugal	FW	Sporting CP	4–0	Académico de Viseu	31 January 1982	
Moinhos (4)	Portugal	FW	Sporting Espinho	4–2	Amora	7 February 1982	
Rui Jordão (13)	Portugal	FW	Sporting CP	3–1	Benfica	28 March 1982	
Diamantino (1)	Portugal	FW	Boavista	5–0	Sporting Espinho	9 May 1982	
Jacques (2)	Portugal	FW	Boavista	0–6	Porto	16 May 1982	
Rui Jordão (14)^{5}	Portugal	FW	Sporting CP	7–1	Rio Ave	16 May 1982	
Caio Cambalhota	Brazil	FW	Amora	5–0	Braga	23 May 1982	
António Oliveira (6)	Portugal	FW	Sporting CP	4–0	Alcobaça	25 September 1982	
Mickey Walsh	Republic of Ireland	FW	Porto	4–0	Vitória de Setúbal	16 October 1982	
N’Habola (1)	Guinea-Bissau	FW	Rio Ave	5–0	Boavista	16 October 1982	
Fernando Gomes (14)	Portugal	FW	Porto	6–0	Estoril	30 October 1982	
N’Habola (2)	Guinea-Bissau	FW	Rio Ave	3–1	Salgueiros	31 October 1982	
N’Habola (3)	Guinea-Bissau	FW	Rio Ave	6–1	Marítimo	5 December 1982	
Rui Jordão (15)	Portugal	FW	Sporting CP	3–0	Salgueiros	5 December 1982	
Fernando Gomes (15)	Portugal	FW	Porto	4–0	Rio Ave	19 December 1982	
Nené (16)	Portugal	FW	Benfica	6–0	Braga	9 January 1983	
Rui Jordão (16)^{D}	Portugal	FW	Sporting CP	3–3	Porto	30 January 1983	
Fernando Gomes (16)	Portugal	FW	Porto	5–0	Braga	6 February 1983	
Fernando Gomes (17)^{4}	Portugal	FW	Porto	6–0	Boavista	27 February 1983	
Diamantino (2)	Portugal	MF	Benfica	8–1	Alcobaça	14 May 1983	
Nené (17)^{4}	Portugal	FW	Benfica	8–1	Alcobaça	14 May 1983	
Toninho Metralha	Brazil	FW	Marítimo	3–0	Rio Ave	15 May 1983	
Fernando Gomes (18)	Portugal	FW	Porto	4–0	Amora	29 May 1983	
Fernando Gomes (19)	Portugal	FW	Porto	4–0	Sporting Espinho	10 September 1983	
Manniche	Denmark	FW	Benfica	8–0	Vitória de Guimarães	7 January 1984	
Jaime Pacheco	Portugal	MF	Porto	6–0	Águeda	12 February 1984	
Nené (18)	Portugal	FW	Benfica	7–0	Braga	3 March 1984	
Nené (19)^{4}	Portugal	FW	Benfica	8–0	Penafiel	25 March 1984	
Fernando Gomes (20)^{4}	Portugal	FW	Porto	8–1	Penafiel	7 April 1984	
Diamantino (2)	Portugal	MF	Benfica	6–0	Sporting Espinho	21 April 1984	
Jorge Silva (2)	Portugal	FW	Boavista	3–0	Varzim	29 April 1984	
Fernando Gomes (21)	Portugal	FW	Porto	8–0	Estoril	13 May 1984	
Djão (1)	Portugal	FW	Belenenses	4–1	Académica de Coimbra	30 September 1984	
Eldon	Brazil	FW	Salgueiros	2–6	Sporting CP	23 September 1984	
Djão (2)^{4}	Portugal	FW	Belenenses	4–3	Salgueiros	30 September 1984	
Serge Cadorin	Belgium	FW	Portimonense	4–0	Penafiel	30 September 1984	
Jorge Silva (2)	Portugal	FW	Benfica	5–1	Portimonense	7 October 1984	
Manuel Fernandes (7)	Portugal	FW	Sporting CP	8–1	Braga	14 November 1984	
Litos	Portugal	FW	Sporting CP	3–2	Rio Ave	1 December 1984	
Fernando Gomes (22)^{5}	Portugal	FW	Porto	9–1	Vizela	16 December 1984	
Fernando Gomes (23)	Portugal	FW	Braga	2–3	Porto	22 December 1984	
Rui Lopes	Guinea-Bissau	FW	Rio Ave	3–2	Braga	30 December 1984	
Fernando Gomes (24)	Portugal	FW	Porto	3–0	Boavista	20 January 1985	
Manuel Pires	Portugal	FW	Boavista	2–3	Rio Ave	27 January 1985	
Paquito Saura	Portugal	MF	Vitória de Guimarães	4–0	Farense	12 May 1985	
Fernando Gomes (25)	Portugal	FW	Porto	5–1	Belenenses	12 May 1985	
Manuel Fernandes (8)^{5}	Portugal	FW	Sporting CP	6–0	Penafiel	24 August 1985	
Rabah Madjer (1)	Algeria	FW	Porto	4–2	Marítimo	1 December 1985	
Paulinho Cascavel (1)	Brazil	FW	Marítimo	0–3	Vitória de Guimarães	22 December 1986	
Manuel Fernandes (9)	Portugal	FW	Sporting CP	4–0	Braga	1 February 1986	
Ralph Meade (1)	England	FW	Académica de Coimbra	1–4	Sporting CP	9 February 1986	
César (1)	Brazil	FW	Vitória de Setúbal	4–0	Penafiel	16 February 1986	
Paulinho Cascavel (2)	Brazil	FW	Vitória de Guimarães	5–3	Braga	2 March 1986	
Rui Águas (1)	Portugal	FW	Benfica	4–0	Chaves	16 March 1986	
Ralph Meade (2)	England	FW	Sporting CP	3–0	Vitória de Guimarães	22 March 1986	
Manuel Fernandes (10)	Portugal	FW	Sporting CP	6–1	SC Covilhã	6 April 1986	
Paulinho Cascavel (3)	Brazil	FW	Vitória de Guimarães	4–1	Marítimo	13 April 1986	
Vladimir Forbs	Guinea-Bissau	FW	Boavista	2–3	Portimonense	6 September 1986	
Stoycho Mladenov	Bulgaria	FW	Belenenses	5–1	Elvas	30 November 1986	
Fernando Gomes (26)	Portugal	FW	Marítimo	1–4	Porto	7 December 1986	
Fernando Gomes (27)^{5}	Portugal	FW	Porto	8–3	Farense	13 December 1986	
José Rafael	Portugal	FW	Boavista	4–0	Salgueiros	13 December 1986	
Manuel Fernandes (11)^{4}	Portugal	FW	Sporting CP	7–1	Benfica	14 December 1986	
Paulinho Cascavel (4)	Brazil	FW	Vitória de Guimarães	4–0	Braga	4 January 1989	
Rui Águas (2)	Portugal	FW	Benfica	3–1	Porto	4 January 1987	
Ralph Meade (2)	England	FW	Sporting CP	4–2	Belenenses	28 February 1987	
Jorge Andrade (1)	Brazil	FW	Farense	4–0	Chaves	1 March 1987	
Nunes	Brazil	FW	Boavista	5–1	Marítimo	31 May 1987	
Rabah Madjer (2)	Algeria	FW	Porto	7–1	Belenenses	26 August 1987	
António Aparício (1)	Portugal	FW	Vitória de Guimarães	1–3	Vitória de Setúbal	12 September 1987	
Radoslav Zdravkov	Bulgaria	MF	Chaves	6–1	Varzim	15 November 1987	
Ademir Alcântara	Brazil	MF	Vitória de Guimarães	4–1	Rio Ave	29 November 1987	
Mats Magnusson (1)	Sweden	FW	Académica de Coimbra	2–4	Benfica	13 December 1987	
Fernando Gomes (28)	Portugal	FW	Rio Ave	0–7	Porto	3 January 1988	
Vitorino Belinha	Portugal	FW	Sporting Espinho	6–0	Elvas	20 February 1988	
Fernando Gomes (29)	Portugal	FW	Porto	3–0	Varzim	28 February 1988	
Manuel Fernandes (12)^{4}	Portugal	FW	Vitória de Setúbal	5–0	Varzim	13 March 1988	
António Aparício (2)	Portugal	FW	Vitória de Setúbal	5–1	SC Covilhã	26 March 1988	
César (2)	Brazil	FW	Varzim	3–4	Penafiel	30 April 1988	
Fernando Gomes (30)	Portugal	FW	Porto	4–0	Farense	29 May 1988	
Fernando Cruz	Portugal	FW	Farense	7–0	SC Covilhã	2 June 1988	
Penteado	Portugal	FW	Leixões	4–0	Sporting Espinho	29 January 1989	
Paulinho Cascavel (5)	Brazil	FW	Sporting CP	4–0	Nacional	4 February 1989	
Rui Águas (3)	Portugal	FW	Porto	5–0	Académico de Viseu	7 February 1989	
Domingos Paciência (1)	Portugal	FW	Porto	5–0	Farense	26 February 1989	
Mats Magnusson (2)^{4}	Sweden	FW	Benfica	5–0	Beira-Mar	10 September 1989	
Mats Magnusson (3)^{4}	Sweden	FW	Benfica	7–0	Penafiel	14 October 1989	
Lachezar Tanev	Bulgaria	MF	Chaves	4–2	Portimonense	15 October 1989	
Mats Magnusson (4)	Sweden	FW	Benfica	5–0	Portimonense	28 October 1989	
Rabah Madjer (3)	Algeria	FW	Feirense	1–4	Porto	19 November 1989	
Mats Magnusson (5)	Sweden	FW	Benfica	4–0	Marítimo	25 November 1989	
Rui Águas (4)	Portugal	FW	Porto	7–0	Tirsense	26 November 1989	
António Aparício (3)	Portugal	FW	Vitória de Setúbal	4–1	Chaves	26 November 1989	
Vata	Angola	FW	Benfica	5–1	Vitória de Setúbal	13 December 1989	
Rabah Madjer (4)	Algeria	FW	Porto	3–0	Feirense	1 April 1990	
Marcelino	Portugal	DF	Feirense	3–1	Braga	29 April 1990	
Fernando Gomes (31)	Portugal	FW	Sporting CP	5–1	Salgueiros	2 September 1990	
Marlon Brandão^{D}	Brazil	FW	Tirsense	4–4	Boavista	12 January 1991	
Pingo	Brazil	FW	Braga	6–2	Nacional	2 February 1991	
Domingos Paciência (2)	Portugal	FW	Porto	4–1	Vitória de Setúbal	16 March 1991	
Moreira de Sá	Portugal	FW	Penafiel	3–0	Beira-Mar	17 March 1991	
Nogueira	Portugal	FW	Gil Vicente	4–1	Boavista	24 February 1991	
Ednilson Lucena (1)	Brazil	FW	Nacional	3–1	Vitória de Guimarães	14 April 1991	
Domingos Paciência (3)^{4}	Portugal	FW	Porto	5–0	Vitória de Guimarães	26 May 1991	
Ricky (1)	Nigeria	FW	Boavista	3–0	Penafiel	15 September 1991	
Petar Mihtarski	Bulgaria	FW	Porto	3–0	União da Madeira	24 November 1991	
Ricky (2)	Nigeria	FW	Boavista	3–0	Paços de Ferreira	1 December 1991	
Chiquinho Carlos	Brazil	FW	Gil Vicente	2–3	Braga	19 January 1992	
Ricky (3)	Nigeria	FW	Boavista	3–0	União da Madeira	2 February 1992	
Jorge Cadete (1)^{4}	Portugal	FW	União da Madeira	1–5	Sporting CP	23 February 1992	
Ednilson Lucena (2)	Brazil	FW	Beira-Mar	1–4	Marítimo	8 March 1992	
Jorge Cadete (2)	Portugal	FW	Gil Vicente	0–3	Sporting CP	22 March 1992	
Ricky (4)^{5}	Nigeria	FW	Boavista	5–0	Estoril	22 March 1992	
Jorge Cadete (3)	Portugal	FW	Sporting CP	4–0	Torreense	25 April 1992	
Ricky (5)^{D}	Nigeria	FW	Boavista	4–4	Chaves	25 April 1992	
Vasil Dragolov	Bulgaria	FW	Torreense	8–1	Estoril	2 May 1992	
Ednilson Lucena (3)	Brazil	FW	Marítimo	7–1	Gil Vicente	13 September 1992	
Ricky (6)	Nigeria	FW	Boavista	4–0	Famalicão	20 September 1992	
Mladen Karoglan	Croatia	FW	Chaves	5–2	Estoril	31 January 1993	
Rui Costa	Portugal	MF	Benfica	5–1	Espinho	7 March 1993	
Mauro Airez	Argentina	FW	Belenenses	3–0	Tirsense	10 April 1993	
Rui Águas (5)	Portugal	FW	Benfica	5–1	Marítimo	23 May 1993	
Jorge Andrade (2)	Brazil	FW	Marítimo	5–2	Farense	12 December 1993	
Rosário†	Portugal	FW	Vitória de Setúbal	6–1	Famalicão	12 December 1993	
Rui Alberto	Portugal	FW	Salgueiros	3–2	Farense	30 December 1993	
Predrag Jokanović	Serbia	MF	União da Madeira	3–1	Salgueiros	12 February 1994	
Emil Kostadinov (1)	Bulgaria	FW	Famalicão	0–5	Porto	20 February 1994	
Emil Kostadinov (2)	Bulgaria	FW	Porto	5–0	Braga	26 February 1994	
Hamed Ziad	Tunisia	FW	Vitória de Guimarães	3–0	Belenenses	13 March 1994	
Jorge Andrade (3)	Brazil	FW	Marítimo	4–0	Braga	27 March 1994	
João Pinto (1)	Portugal	FW	Sporting CP	3–6	Benfica	14 May 1994	
Hassan Nader	Morocco	FW	Farense	4–1	Salgueiros	22 May 1994	
Rashidi Yekini	Nigeria	FW	Vitória de Setúbal	4–0	Salgueiros	25 May 1994	
Marcelo	Brazil	FW	Tirsense	3–0	Farense	18 September 1994	
Roberto Carlos Jorge	Brazil	FW	Gil Vicente	3–2	Braga	4 February 1995	
Edmílson (1)	Brazil	FW	Salgueiros	6–0	Estrela da Amadora	25 February 1995	
Nelson Bertollazzi	Brazil	FW	União de Leiria	5–0	Farense	26 March 1995	
Edmílson (2)	Brazil	FW	Tirsense	1–3	Salgueiros	26 March 1995	
Ivaylo Iordanov	Bulgaria	FW	Sporting CP	4–0	União da Madeira	2 April 1995	
Edinho	Brazil	FW	Vitória de Guimarães	6–0	Marítimo	10 February 1996	
Edmílson (3)	Brazil	FW	Porto	6–3	Braga	3 March 1996	
Constantino (1)	Portugal	FW	Leça	3–1	Tirsense	14 April 1996	
João Pinto (2)	Portugal	FW	Benfica	5–1	Marítimo	12 May 1996	
Constantino (2)	Portugal	FW	Leça	3–0	União de Leiria	1 September 1996	
Fernando^{L}	Brazil	FW	Rio Ave	3–4	Sporting CP	14 September 1996	
Chiquinho Conde	Mozambique	FW	Vitória de Setúbal	4–1	União de Leiria	20 October 1996	
Constantino (3)	Portugal	FW	Belenenses	0–4	Leça	24 November 1996	
Gilmar Estevam (1)	Brazil	FW	Vitória de Guimarães	3–0	Chaves	24 November 1996	
Mário Jardel (1)	Brazil	FW	Chaves	2–4	Porto	15 February 1997	
Gilmar Estevam (2)	Brazil	FW	Vitória de Guimarães	4–1	Chaves	23 February 1997	
Jimmy Floyd Hasselbaink (1)	Netherlands	FW	Boavista	3–1	Marítimo	2 March 1997	
Dibo	Ivory Coast	FW	Rio Ave	4–1	Belenenses	23 March 1997	
Nuno Gomes (1)	Portugal	FW	Boavista	7–1	Gil Vicente	27 April 1997	
Jimmy Floyd Hasselbaink (2)	Netherlands	FW	Boavista	7–1	Gil Vicente	27 April 1997	
Nuno Gomes (2)	Portugal	FW	Boavista	5–0	Salgueiros	25 May 1997	
Herivelto†	Brazil	FW	Marítimo	6–0	Braga	25 May 1997	
Mário Jardel (2)	Brazil	FW	Porto	5–2	Farense	1 December 1997	
Isaías	Brazil	FW	Campomaiorense	4–0	Braga	13 December 1997	
Nuno Gomes (3)^{4}	Portugal	FW	Benfica	4–0	Varzim	21 December 1997	
Leandro Machado	Brazil	FW	Belenenses	0–4	Sporting CP	10 January 1998	
Demétrius (1)^{L}	Brazil	FW	Campomaiorense	3–5	Sporting CP	10 April 1998	
Paulo Alves	Portugal	FW	Campomaiorense	3–5	Sporting CP	10 April 1998	
Mário Jardel (3)^{5}	Brazil	FW	Porto	7–2	Salgueiros	10 May 1998	
Nuno Gomes (4)^{5}	Portugal	FW	Benfica	7–1	Leça	17 May 1998	
Demétrius (2)	Brazil	FW	Académica de Coimbra	1–5	Campomaiorense	30 August 1998	
Gilmar Estevam (3)	Brazil	FW	Vitória de Guimarães	5–1	Braga	21 September 1998	
Nuno Gomes (5)	Portugal	FW	Benfica	3–1	Marítimo	26 September 1998	
Augustine Ahinful	Ghana	FW	Campomaiorense	0–3	União de Leiria	27 September 1998	
Nando	Guinea-Bissau	FW	Vitória de Setúbal	3–0	Salgueiros	15 November 1998	
Elpídio Silva (1)	Brazil	FW	Braga	3–0	Vitória de Setúbal	21 November 1998	
Nuno Gomes (6)	Portugal	FW	Chaves	0–4	Benfica	13 December 1998	
Mário Jardel (4)^{4}	Brazil	FW	Porto	7–0	Beira-Mar	24 January 1999	
Nandinho	Portugal	FW	Alverca	3–2	Sporting CP	17 April 1999	
Demétrius (3)	Brazil	FW	Campomaiorense	3–1	Farense	25 April 1999	
Mário Jardel (5)	Brazil	FW	Porto	7–1	Académica de Coimbra	16 May 1999	
Demétrius (4)	Brazil	FW	Campomaiorense	4–1	Chaves	30 May 1999	
Hugo Henrique	Brazil	FW	Rio Ave	4–1	Salgueiros	12 September 1999	
Mário Jardel (6)	Brazil	FW	Porto	4–1	Rio Ave	18 September 1999	
Clayton	Brazil	FW	Rio Ave	0–5	Santa Clara	26 September 1999	
Ednilson Lucena (4)	Brazil	FW	Vitória de Guimarães	4–2	Belenenses	5 November 1999	
Mário Jardel (7)	Brazil	FW	Salgueiros	0–4	Porto	28 November 1999	
Mário Jardel (8)	Brazil	FW	Vitória de Setúbal	1–4	Porto	13 December 1999	
Mário Jardel (9)	Brazil	FW	Porto	5–0	Farense	20 December 1999	
Maniche	Portugal	FW	Benfica	6–2	Farense	20 February 2000	
Mário Jardel (10)	Brazil	FW	Porto	4–1	Vitória de Setúbal	22 April 2000	
Beto Acosta (1)	Argentina	FW	Vitória de Guimarães	1–4	Sporting CP	26 August 2000	
Federico Lagorio	Argentina	FW	Marítimo	3–0	Benfica	5 November 2000	
João Tomás (1)	Portugal	FW	Vitória de Guimarães	0–4	Benfica	18 November 2000	
Pierre van Hooijdonk	Netherlands	FW	Benfica	5–1	Desportivo das Aves	13 January 2001	
Beto Acosta (2)	Argentina	FW	Sporting CP	3–1	Vitória de Guimarães	27 January 2001	
Edmílson (4)	Brazil	FW	Salgueiros	2–5	Sporting CP	2 March 2001	
Rafael	Brazil	FW	Farense	2–4	Paços de Ferreira	29 April 2001	
Elpídio Silva (2)	Brazil	FW	Salgueiros	1–5	Boavista	13 May 2001	
Deco	Brazil	MF	Porto	4–0	Boavista	27 May 2001	
Leonardo	Brazil	FW	Paços de Ferreira	3–1	Belenenses	12 August 2001	
Mantorras	Angola	FW	Benfica	3–2	Vitória de Setúbal	25 August 2001	
Filgueira	Brazil	DF	Varzim	1–5	Belenenses	14 September 2001	
Márcio Mixirica	Brazil	FW	Gil Vicente	0–3	Boavista	22 September 2001	
Mário Jardel (11)	Brazil	FW	Farense	1–3	Sporting CP	23 September 2001	
Fary Faye^{4}	Senegal	FW	Beira-Mar	1–5	Belenenses	15 October 2001	
Carlos Fangueiro	Portugal	FW	Vitória de Guimarães	4–0	Varzim	27 October 2001	
Derlei (1)^{4}	Brazil	FW	União de Leiria	7–0	Salgueiros	9 December 2001	
Mário Jardel (12)	Brazil	FW	Alverca	1–3	Sporting CP	26 January 2002	
Mário Jardel (13)	Brazil	FW	Sporting CP	4–1	União de Leiria	2 February 2002	
Marco Ferreira	Portugal	MF	Vitória de Setúbal	3–2	Gil Vicente	16 March 2002	
Benni McCarthy (1)	South Africa	FW	Braga	0–4	Porto	20 April 2002	
Benni McCarthy (2)	South Africa	FW	Porto	5–3	Santa Clara	27 April 2002	
Barata^{5}	Brazil	FW	Braga	5–3	Alverca	5 May 2002	
Rafael Jacques†	Brazil	FW	Vitória de Guimarães	2–4	União de Leiria	5 May 2002	
Mauro	Angola	FW	Paços de Ferreira	4–0	Sporting CP	14 September 2002	
Henry Antchouet (1)	Gabon	FW	Belenenses	3–2	Braga	5 October 2002	
Paulo Vida†	Portugal	FW	Vitória de Setúbal	2–4	Varzim	13 December 2002	
Mário Jardel (14)	Brazil	FW	Sporting CP	4–0	Paços de Ferreira	2 February 2003	
Ludemar	Brazil	FW	Belenenses	4–1	Varzim	16 February 2003	
Simão Sabrosa	Portugal	MF	Vitória de Setúbal	2–6	Benfica	22 February 2003	
Miklós Fehér	Hungary	FW	Benfica	4–0	Vitória de Guimarães	1 June 2003	
Henry Antchouet (2)	Gabon	FW	Belenenses	4–0	Estrela da Amadora	7 September 2003	
Adriano	Brazil	FW	Nacional	4–2	Vitória de Guimarães	5 October 2003	
Derlei (2)	Brazil	FW	Porto	4–1	Académica de Coimbra	5 October 2003	
Liédson (1)^{4}	Brazil	FW	Sporting CP	4–0	Estrela da Amadora	10 April 2004	
Adriano Rossato	Brazil	FW	Nacional	3–0	Beira-Mar	25 April 2004	
Benni McCarthy (3)	South Africa	FW	Porto	3–1	Paços de Ferreira	9 May 2004	
Henry Antchouet (3)^{D}	Gabon	FW	Beira-Mar	3–3	Belenenses	5 November 2004	
Mauricio Pinilla	Chile	FW	Braga	0–3	Sporting CP	1 May 2005	
Nuno Gomes (7)	Portugal	FW	Benfica	4–0	União de Leiria	18 September 2005	
Hassan Ahamada	France	FW	Belenenses	5–0	Penafiel	29 January 2006	
Joeano	Brazil	FW	Gil Vicente	4–3	Académica de Coimbra	19 February 2006	
Marek Saganowski	Poland	FW	Vitória de Guimarães	4–0	Vitória de Setúbal	3 March 2006	
Albert Meyong (1)	Cameroon	FW	Belenenses	4–0	Vitória de Setúbal	14 April 2006	
Buba Yohanna^{D}	Cameroon	DF	Beira-Mar	3–3	Sporting CP	27 October 2006	
Carlos Bueno^{4}†	Uruguay	FW	Sporting CP	5–1	Nacional	4 November 2007	
Alecsandro	Brazil	FW	Sporting CP	4–0	Naval 1º de Maio	22 April 2007	
Lito^{D}	Cape Verde	FW	Académica de Coimbra	3–3	Estrela da Amadora	4 November 2007	
Laionel	Brazil	FW	Boavista	4–3	Paços de Ferreira	3 February 2008	
Nuno Assis	Portugal	MF	Vitória de Setúbal	2–4	Vitória de Guimarães	31 January 2009	
Baba Diawara	Senegal	FW	Marítimo	5–1	Vitória de Setúbal	1 March 2009	
Óscar Cardozo (1)	Paraguay	FW	Benfica	8–1	Vitória de Setúbal	31 August 2009	
Óscar Cardozo (2)	Paraguay	FW	Benfica	6–1	Nacional	26 October 2009	
Edgar (1)	Brazil	FW	Leixões	2–4	Nacional	8 November 2009	
Óscar Cardozo (3)	Paraguay	FW	Benfica	4–0	Académica de Coimbra	6 December 2009	
Ángel Di María	Argentina	MF	Leixões	0–4	Benfica	27 February 2010	
Liédson (2)^{4}	Portugal	FW	Belenenses	0–4	Sporting CP	7 March 2010	
Yannick Djaló	Portugal	FW	Sporting CP	5–0	Rio Ave	2 April 2010	
Óscar Cardozo (4)	Paraguay	FW	Benfica	5–0	Olhanense	24 April 2010	
Marcelo Toscano	Brazil	FW	Nacional	1–3	Vitória de Guimarães	28 August 2010	
Pizzi (1)^{D}	Portugal	FW	Porto	3–3	Paços de Ferreira	8 May 2011	
Edgar (2)	Brazil	FW	Paços de Ferreira	1–5	Vitória de Guimarães	4 November 2011	
Lima (1)	Brazil	FW	Gil Vicente	0–3	Braga	18 February 2012	
Kléber	Brazil	FW	Rio Ave	2–5	Porto	12 May 2012	
Ricky van Wolfswinkel (1)	Netherlands	FW	Sporting CP	3–2	Braga	12 May 2012	
Luís Leal	São Tomé and Príncipe	FW	Estoril	3–1	Marítimo	24 September 2012	
João Tomás (2)	Portugal	FW	Vitória de Setúbal	3–5	Rio Ave	25 November 2012	
Albert Meyong (2)^{L}	Cameroon	FW	Vitória de Setúbal	3–5	Rio Ave	25 November 2012	
Óscar Cardozo (5)	Paraguay	FW	Sporting CP	1–3	Benfica	10 December 2012	
Óscar Cardozo (6)	Paraguay	FW	Benfica	4–1	Marítimo	15 December 2012	
Edinho (1)	Portugal	FW	Académica de Coimbra	4–2	Vitória de Setúbal	5 January 2013	
Albert Meyong (3)	Cameroon	FW	Vitória de Setúbal	5–0	Moreirense	13 January 2013	
Jackson Martínez	Colombia	FW	Vitória de Guimarães	0–4	Porto	3 February 2013	
Lima (2)	Brazil	FW	Benfica	6–1	Rio Ave	30 March 2013	
Ricky van Wolfswinkel (2)	Netherlands	FW	Braga	2–3	Sporting CP	1 April 2013	
Fredy Montero	Colombia	FW	Sporting CP	0–5	Arouca	18 August 2013	
Mario Rondón (1)	Venezuela	FW	Paços de Ferreira	0–5	Nacional	19 April 2014	
Ahmed Hassan	Egypt	MF	Estoril	0–5	Rio Ave	24 August 2014	
Talisca	Brazil	MF	Vitória de Setúbal	0–5	Benfica	12 September 2014	
André André	Portugal	MF	Vitória de Guimarães	4–0	Nacional	4 January 2015	
Mario Rondón (2)^{D}	Venezuela	FW	Arouca	3–3	Nacional	8 February 2015	
Cristian Tello	Spain	FW	Porto	3–0	Sporting CP	1 March 2015	
Islam Slimani	Algeria	FW	Sporting CP	5–1	Vitória de Guimarães	4 October 2015	
Jonas (1)	Brazil	FW	Nacional	5–0	Benfica	11 January 2016	
Kostas Mitroglou	Greece	FW	Belenenses	0–5	Benfica	5 February 2016	
Léo Bonatini	Brazil	FW	Estoril	3–0	Vitória de Setúbal	27 February 2016	
Okacha Hamzaoui	Algeria	FW	Feirense	0–3	Nacional	24 September 2016	
Diogo Jota	Portugal	FW	Nacional	0–4	Porto	1 October 2016	
Moussa Marega	Mali	FW	Rio Ave	0–3	Vitória de Guimarães	30 October 2016	
Jorginho	Portugal	MF	Moreirense	1–4	Arouca	17 December 2016	
Bas Dost (1)^{4}	Netherlands	FW	Tondela	1–4	Sporting CP	11 March 2017	
Bas Dost (2)	Netherlands	FW	Sporting CP	4–0	Boavista	8 April 2017	
Bas Dost (3)	Netherlands	FW	Braga	2–3	Sporting CP	30 April 2017	
Bas Dost (4)	Netherlands	FW	Sporting CP	4–1	Chaves	21 May 2017	
Jonas (2)	Brazil	FW	Benfica	5–0	Belenenses	19 August 2017	
Vincent Aboubakar (1)	Cameroon	FW	Porto	3–0	Moreirense	20 August 2017	
Bas Dost (5)	Netherlands	FW	Sporting CP	5–1	Chaves	22 October 2017	
Vincent Aboubakar (2)	Cameroon	FW	Vitória de Setúbal	0–5	Porto	10 December 2017	
Bas Dost (6)	Netherlands	FW	Sporting CP	5–0	Marítimo	7 January 2018	
Bas Dost (7)	Netherlands	FW	Sporting CP	3–0	Desportivo das Aves	14 January 2018	
Fabrício	Brazil	FW	Portimonense	4–1	Rio Ave	29 January 2018	
Jonas (3)	Brazil	FW	Benfica	5–0	Marítimo	3 March 2018	
Edinho (2)^{4}	Portugal	FW	Desportivo das Aves	1–4	Vitória de Setúbal	29 March 2018	
Pires	Portugal	FW	Portimonense	4–3	Moreirense	31 March 2018	
Pizzi (2)	Portugal	MF	Benfica	3–2	Vitória de Guimarães	10 August 2018	
Vítor Gomes	Portugal	MF	Desportivo das Aves	3–0	Portimonense	1 October 2018	
Hildeberto Pereira	Cape Verde	FW	Vitória de Setúbal	3–0	Moreirense	6 October 2018	
Dyego Sousa	Portugal	FW	Braga	4–0	Feirense	14 December 2018	
Francisco Soares	Brazil	FW	Chaves	1–4	Porto	18 January 2019	
Sardor Rashidov	Uzbekistan	FW	Nacional	4–0	Feirense	16 February 2019	
William Alves	Brazil	FW	Chaves	4–1	Nacional	28 April 2019	
Bruno Fernandes	Portugal	MF	Belenenses SAD	1–8	Sporting CP	5 May 2019	
Guilherme Schettine^{D}	Brazil	FW	Santa Clara	4–4	Feirense	11 May 2019	
Zé Luís	Cape Verde	FW	Porto	4–0	Vitória de Setúbal	17 August 2019	
Mehdi Taremi (1)	Iran	FW	Rio Ave	5–1	Desportivo das Aves	23 August 2019	
Paulinho (1)	Portugal	FW	Paços de Ferreira	1–5	Braga	10 July 2020	
Mario González	Spain	FW	Moreirense	2–3	Tondela	17 April 2021	
Pedro Gonçalves (1)	Portugal	MF	Sporting CP	5–1	Marítimo	19 May 2021	
Mehdi Taremi (2)	Iran	FW	Tondela	1–3	Porto	23 October 2021	
João Pedro	Portugal	MF	Tondela	4–2	Marítimo	7 November 2021	
Darwin Núñez (1)	Uruguay	FW	Belenenses SAD	7–0	Benfica	27 November 2021	
Darwin Núñez (2)	Uruguay	FW	Famalicão	4–1	Benfica	13 December 2021	
Paulinho (2)	Portugal	FW	Sporting CP	3–2	Portimonense	29 December 2021	
Vitinha	Portugal	FW	Arouca	0–6	Braga	30 December 2021	
Evanilson	Brazil	FW	Belenenses SAD	1–4	Porto	16 January 2022	
Darwin Núñez (3)	Uruguay	FW	Benfica	3–1	Belenenses SAD	9 April 2022	
Joel Tagueu	Cameroon	FW	Marítimo	4–0	Boavista	16 April 2022	
Mehdi Taremi (3)	Iran	FW	Porto	7–0	Portimonense	16 April 2022	
Mehdi Taremi (4)	Iran	FW	Porto	5–1	Arouca	28 December 2022	
Francisco Trincão	Portugal	FW	Casa Pia	3–4	Sporting CP	9 April 2023	
Mehdi Taremi (5)^{4}	Iran	FW	Famalicão	2–4	Porto	20 May 2023	
Héctor Hernández	Spain	FW	Chaves	4–2	Gil Vicente	7 October 2023	
Simon Banza	DR Congo	FW	Braga	6–1	Portimonense	4 November 2023	
Rafa Mújica	Spain	FW	Arouca	3–0	Gil Vicente	16 December 2023	
Viktor Gyökeres (1)	Sweden	FW	Sporting CP	6–1	Boavista	17 March 2024	
Kanya Fujimoto	Japan	MF	Gil Vicente	4–2	AVS	16 August 2024	
Viktor Gyökeres (2)	Sweden	FW	Farense	0–5	Sporting CP	23 August 2024	
Kerem Aktürkoğlu	Turkey	FW	Benfica	5–0	Rio Ave	27 October 2024	
Samu Aghehowa	Spain	FW	AVS	0–5	Porto	28 October 2024	
Viktor Gyökeres (3)^{4}	Sweden	FW	Sporting CP	5–1	Estrela da Amadora	1 November 2024	
Viktor Gyökeres (4)^{D}	Sweden	FW	Vitória de Guimarães	4–4	Sporting CP	3 January 2025	
Leandro Barreiro	Luxembourg	MF	Benfica	4–0	Famalicão	17 January 2025	
Pablo	Portugal	FW	Boavista	1–3	Gil Vicente	1 April 2025	
André Lacximicant	Portugal	FW	AVS	0–3	Estoril	4 April 2025	
Vangelis Pavlidis (1)	Greece	FW	Porto	1–4	Benfica	6 April 2025	
Viktor Gyökeres (5)	Sweden	FW	Sporting CP	3–1	Moreirense	18 April 2025	
Viktor Gyökeres (6)^{4}	Sweden	FW	Boavista	0–5	Sporting CP	27 April 2025	
Yanis Begraoui (1)	Morocco	FW	Estoril	4–0	Estrela da Amadora	17 May 2025	
Pedro Gonçalves (2)	Portugal	MF	Nacional	1–4	Sporting CP	23 August 2025	
Vangelis Pavlidis (2)	Greece	FW	Benfica	5–0	Arouca	25 October 2025	
Yanis Begraoui (2)	Morocco	FW	Rio Ave	0–4	Estoril	1 November 2025	
Sidny Lopes Cabral	Cape Verde	DF	Casa Pia	3–5	Estrela da Amadora	1 November 2025	
Vangelis Pavlidis (3)	Greece	FW	Moreirense	0–4	Benfica	14 December 2025	
Luis Suárez	Colombia	FW	Sporting CP	4–0	Rio Ave	28 December 2025	
Vangelis Pavlidis (4)	Greece	FW	Benfica	3–1	Estoril	3 January 2026	
Jesús Ramírez^{D}	Venezuela	FW	Nacional	3–3	Santa Clara	11 January 2026	
Yanis Begraoui (3)	Morocco	FW	Estrela da Amadora	0–5	Estoril	19 January 2026	
Vangelis Pavlidis (5)	Greece	FW	Casa Pia	0–7	Benfica	17 August 2026	

== Statistics ==
=== Multiple hat-tricks ===
The following table lists the players who scored multiple hat-tricks.

Multiple Primeira Liga hat-tricks by player
Rank	Player	Hat-tricks
1	(Portugal) Fernando Peyroteo	44
2	(Portugal) Fernando Gomes	31
3	(Portugal) Eusébio	29
4	(Portugal) José Águas	26
5	(Portugal) Nené	19
6	(Portugal) Rui Jordão	16
6	(Portugal) José Torres	16
8	(Brazil) Mário Jardel	14
8	(Portugal) Matateu	14
10	(Portugal) Julinho	13
11	(Portugal) Arsénio	12
11	(Portugal) Jesus Correia	12
11	(Portugal) Manuel Fernandes	12
11	(Portugal) João Lourenço	12
11	(Portugal) Manuel Vasques	12
16	(Portugal) Correia Dias	11
16	(Portugal) Artur Jorge	11
16	(Portugal) António Teixeira	11
19	(Portugal) António Araújo	10
19	(Portugal) João Cruz	10
19	(Argentina) Héctor Yazalde	10
22	(Portugal) José Augusto	8
22	(Portugal) Rogério Pipi	8
22	(Portugal) Manuel Soeiro	8
25	(Netherlands) Bas Dost	7
25	(Portugal) Patalino	7
25	(Portugal) Nuno Gomes	7
25	(Portugal) Hernâni Silva	7
25	(Portugal) José Travassos	7
29	(Portugal) Vítor Baptista	6
29	(Paraguay) Óscar Cardozo	6
29	(Portugal) Nélson Fernandes	6
29	(Sweden) Viktor Gyökeres	6
29	(Portugal) António Oliveira	6
29	(Nigeria) Ricky	6
35	(Portugal) Rui Águas	5
35	(Brazil) Paulinho Cascavel	5
35	(Brazil) Duda	5
35	(Sweden) Mats Magnusson	5
35	(Greece) Vangelis Pavlidis	5
35	(Portugal) Francisco Rodrigues	5
35	(Iran) Mehdi Taremi	5
42	(Portugal) Domiciano Cavém	4
42	(Brazil) Demétrius	4
42	(Portugal) Carlos Duarte	4
42	(Brazil) Edmílson	4
42	(Portugal) Ernesto Figueiredo	4
42	(Portugal) Horácio	4
42	(Brazil) Edmilson Lucena	4
42	(Algeria) Rabah Madjer	4
50	(Portugal) Albano	3
50	(Morocco) Yanis Begraoui	3
50	(Portugal) Caraça	3
50	(Brazil) Jorge Andrade	3
50	(Gabon) Henry Antchouet	3
50	(Portugal) António Aparício	3
50	(Portugal) Jorge Cadete	3
50	(Portugal) Constantino	3
50	(Portugal) José Costa	3
50	(Brazil) Gilmar Estevam	3
50	(Brazil) Jonas	3
50	(South Africa) Benni McCarthy	3
50	(England) Ralph Meade	3
50	(Cameroon) Albert Meyong	3
50	(Portugal) Adolfo Mourão	3
50	(Guinea-Bissau) N’Habola	3
50	(Uruguay) Darwin Núñez	3
50	(Portugal) Domingos Paciência	3
50	(Portugal) Santana	3
50	(Portugal) Espírito Santo	3
50	(Portugal) Rogério Sousa	3
50	(Portugal) Joaquim Teixeira	3
50	(Portugal) Alfredo Valadas	3
72	(Cameroon) Vincent Aboubakar	2
72	(Argentina) Beto Acosta	2
72	(Portugal) Carlos Brito	2
72	(Brazil) César	2
72	(Brazil) Paulo César	2
72	(Portugal) Mário Coluna	2
72	(Brazil) Derlei	2
72	(Brazil) Diamantino	2
72	(Portugal) Djão	2
72	(Brazil) Edgar	2
72	(Portugal) Edinho	2
72	(Portugal) Pedro Gonçalves	2
72	(Netherlands) Jimmy Floyd Hasselbaink	2
72	(Portugal) Jacques	2
72	(Bulgaria) Emil Kostadinov	2
72	(Brazil) / (Portugal) Liédson	2
72	(Brazil) Lima	2
72	(Portugal) Marinho	2
72	(Portugal) Moinhos	2
72	(Portugal) Paulinho	2
72	(Portugal) João Pinto	2
72	(Portugal) Pizzi	2
72	(Venezuela) Mario Rondón	2
72	(Portugal) Félix Salvador	2
72	(Brazil) Elpídio Silva	2
72	(Brazil) Jorge Silva	2
72	(Portugal) João Tomás	2
72	(Brazil) Ademir Vieira	2
72	(Netherlands) Ricky van Wolfswinkel	2

=== Hat-tricks by nationality ===
The following table lists the number of hat-tricks scored by players from a single nation.

Primeira Liga hat-tricks by nationality
Rank	Nation	Hat-tricks
1	Portugal	292
2	Brazil	92
3	Netherlands	12
4	Sweden	11
5	Bulgaria	8
6	Cameroon	7
6	Nigeria	7
8	Algeria	6
8	Greece	6
8	Guinea-Bissau	6
8	Paraguay	6
12	Argentina	5
12	Iran	5
12	Spain	5
15	Cape Verde	4
15	Morocco	4
15	Uruguay	4
18	Angola	3
18	Colombia	3
18	England	3
18	Gabon	3
18	South Africa	3
18	Venezuela	3
24	Senegal	2
25	Belgium	1
25	Chile	1
25	Croatia	1
25	Denmark	1
25	DR Congo	1
25	Egypt	1
25	Hungary	1
25	Ivory Coast	1
25	Japan	1
25	Luxembourg	1
25	Mali	1
25	Mozambique	1
25	Peru	1
25	Poland	1
25	Republic of Ireland	1
25	São Tomé and Príncipe	1
25	Serbia	1
25	Tunisia	1
25	Turkey	1
25	Uzbekistan	1
25	Yugoslavia	1

=== Hat-tricks by club ===
The following table lists the number of hat-tricks scored by clubs.

Primeira Liga hat-tricks by club
Rank	Club	Hat-tricks
1	Benfica	140
2	Porto	60
3	Sporting CP	57
4	Vitória de Guimarães	19
5	Boavista	17
6	Vitória de Setúbal	13
7	Belenenses	11
7	Rio Ave	11
9	Braga	9
9	Lusit. Évora	9
9	Marítimo	9
9	Nacional	9
13	Estoril	6
14	Campomaiorense	5
14	Chaves	5
16	Gil Vicente	4
16	Paços de Ferreira	4
16	Portimonense	4
19	Académica de Coimbra	3
19	Farense	3
19	Leça	3
19	Salgueiros	3
19	União Leiria	3
24	Arouca	2
24	Beira-Mar	2
24	Penafiel	2
24	Santa Clara	2
24	Tondela	2
29	Alverca	1
29	Desportivo Aves	1
29	Estrela da Amadora	1
29	Feirense	1
29	Leixões	1
29	Sporting Espinho	1
29	Tirsense	1
29	Torreense	1
29	União da Madeira	1
29	Varzim	1

== See also ==
- List of Bundesliga hat-tricks
- List of Ligue 1 hat-tricks
- List of La Liga hat-tricks
- List of Premier League hat-tricks
- List of Serie A hat-tricks
