= List of Primeira Liga top scorers =

Top scorers of Portuguese football league

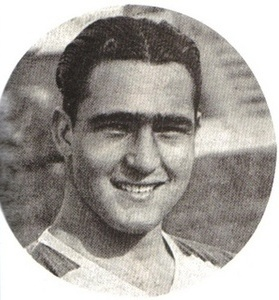
Fernando Peyroteo scored the most goals in Primeira Liga history.

This is a list of players who scored over 100 goals in Primeira Liga, Portugal's top flight football league, during its history starting from the 1934–35 season.

== All-time top scorers ==
Key

- **Bold** shows players still playing in Primeira Liga.
- Italics show players still playing professional football in other leagues.

As of matches played on 18 May 2019

Rank	Player	Goals	Apps	Ratio	First	Last	Club(s) (goals/apps)	Notes
1	(Portugal) Fernando Peyroteo	332	197	1.69	1937	1950	Sporting	
2	(Portugal) Eusébio	320	313	1.02	1960	1977	Benfica (317/301), Beira-Mar (3/12)	
3	(Portugal) Fernando Gomes	319	404	0.79	1974	1991	Porto (288/341), Sporting (31/63)	
4	(Portugal) José Águas	281	291	0.97	1950	1963	Benfica	
5	(Portugal) Nené	262	422	0.62	1968	1986	Benfica	
6	(Portugal) Manuel Fernandes	243	486	0.5	1969	1988	CUF (36/132), Sporting (191/326), Vitória Setúbal (16/28)	
7	(Portugal) Matateu	219	291	0.75	1951	1967	Belenenses (210/270), Atlético (9/21)	
8	(Portugal) José Torres	218	378	0.58	1959	1980	Benfica (151/172), Vitória Setúbal (53/96), Estoril (14/110)	
9	(Portugal) Arsénio	215	313	0.69	1943	1959	Benfica (155/224), CUF (60/89)	
10	(Portugal) Rui Jordão	213	358	0.59	1971	1989	Benfica (63/91), Sporting (138/207), Vitória Setúbal (12/60)	
11	(Portugal) Manuel Vasques	189	282	0.67	1946	1960	Sporting (188/278), Atlético (1/4)	
12	(Brazil) Mário Jardel	185	186	0.99	1996	2007	Porto (129/125), Sporting (53/49), Beira-Mar (3/12)	
13	(Portugal) Julinho	168	166	1.01	1941	1953	Académico (16/22), Benfica (152/144)	
14	(Portugal) José Augusto	162	343	0.47	1955	1970	Barreirense (48/98), Benfica (114/245)	
15	(Portugal) Artur Jorge	160	245	0.65	1964	1978	Porto (1/4), Académica (71/95), Benfica (74/95), Belenenses (14/51)	
16	(Portugal) Nuno Gomes	154	393	0.39	1994	2012	Boavista (23/79), Benfica (125/294), Braga (6/20)	
17	(Portugal) António Teixeira	147	205	0.72	1949	1962	Benfica (5/7), Vitória Guimarães (17/25), Porto (125/173)	
18	(Portugal) Hernâni Silva	137	279	0.49	1950	1964	Porto (128/255), Estoril (9/24)	
19	(Portugal) Lourenço	134	208	0.64	1961	1972	Académica (40/56), Sporting (94/152)	
19	(Portugal) Bentes	134	270	0.5	1945	1960	Académica	
21	(Portugal) João Martins	132	206	0.64	1947	1959	Sporting	
21	(Portugal) Rogério Pipi	132	243	0.54	1942	1958	Benfica (125/210), Oriental (7/33)	
23	(Portugal) Jesus Correia	129	159	0.81	1943	1956	Sporting (128/157), CUF (1/2)	
24	(Portugal) Araújo	122	151	0.81	1942	1952	Porto	
25	(Portugal) Rui Águas	121	292	0.41	1983	1995	Portimonense (10/46), Porto (30/64), Benfica (77/173), Estrela (4/9)	
26	(Portugal) Patalino	120	187	0.64	1945	1956	O Elvas (92/109), Lusitano (28/78)	
27	(Portugal) Horácio	118	313	0.38	1966	1981	Leixões (84/211), Varzim (34/102)	
27	(Portugal) João Pinto	118	476	0.25	1988	2008	Boavista (23/108), Benfica (64/220), Sporting (28/115), Braga (3/33)	
29	(Portugal) António Fernandes	117	160	0.73	1958	1968	Belenenses (94/125), Benfica (23/35)	
30	(Portugal) Liedson	116	220	0.53	2003	2013	Sporting (116/214), Porto (0/6)	
31	(Portugal) Albano	115	241	0.48	1943	1956	Sporting	
32	(Portugal) Francisco Rodrigues	114	122	0.93	1935	1946	Vitória Setúbal (65/75), Benfica (49/47)	
33	(Portugal) Ernesto Figueiredo	113	196	0.58	1960	1970	Sporting (99/155), Vitória Setúbal (14/41)	
34	(Paraguay) Óscar Cardozo	112	175	0.64	2007	2014	Benfica	
34	(Brazil) Edmilson	112	356	0.31	1988	2002	Nacional (23/86), Marítimo (48/145), Vitória Guimarães (29/88), Braga (12/37)	
36	(Portugal) Manuel António	111	247	0.45	1964	1977	Académica (81/203), Porto (30/44)	
37	(Brazil) Jonas	110	132	0.83	2014	2019	Benfica	
38	(Portugal) Faia	109	240	0.45	1951	1963	Barreirense (72/148), Académica (18/39), CUF (19/53)	
38	(Portugal) António Oliveira	109	296	0.37	1970	1986	Porto (72/200), Penafiel (10/22), Sporting (27/67), Marítimo (0/7)	
40	(Portugal) Francisco André	108	190	0.57	1951	1959	Belenenses (40/70), Académica (68/120)	
40	(Portugal) Custódio Pinto	108	359	0.3	1961	1975	Porto (80/243), Vitória Guimarães (28/116)	
42	(Portugal) Rafael Correia	106	155	0.68	1934	1948	Belenenses	
42	(Portugal) José Travassos	106	249	0.43	1946	1959	Sporting	
42	(Portugal) Tito	106	292	0.36	1966	1979	Atlético (14/49), União de Tomar (6/26), Vitória Guimarães (86/202), Famalicão (0/15)	
45	(Portugal) Correia Dias	105	114	0.92	1941	1949	Porto	
45	(Portugal) Domingos	105	263	0.4	1987	2001	Porto	
47	(Argentina) Hector Yazalde	104	104	1	1971	1975	Sporting	
48	(Brazil) Gaúcho	103	278	0.37	1996	2006	Estrela (54/133), Marítimo (35/83), Rio Ave (14/62)	
49	(Portugal) João Tomás	101	261	0.39	1997	2013	Académica (8/49), Benfica (21/41), Vitória Guimarães (3/20), Braga (31/69), Rio Ave (40/82)	

== See also ==
- Bola de Prata (Portugal)
- List of Primeira Liga hat-tricks
