= Bola de Prata (Portugal) =

Primeira Liga award for the league top scorer

- Sport: Association football
- Competition: Primeira Liga
- Country: Portugal
- Presented by: A Bola

History
- First award: 1952–53
- First winner: (Portugal) Matateu
- Most wins: (Portugal) Eusébio (7)
- Most recent: (Colombia) Luis Suárez

The Bola de Prata (Portuguese for Silver Ball) is a Primeira Liga award for the top scorer. In case two or more players have the same number of goals, the award goes to the footballer with the fewest games played. It was first awarded as a prize in the 1952–53 season by sports newspaper A Bola.

Héctor Yazalde holds the record for most goals in a single season, with 46, achieved in the 1973–74 season. Fernando Peyroteo recorded the highest goals-to-games ratio to win the award, 2.43, in 1937–38.

There have been 57 winners. Nineteen players have won the award on more than one occasion, with Eusébio having the record with seven wins. Eusébio also holds the record for most consecutive wins, with five. Rui Jordão, Paulinho Cascavel, Mário Jardel and Mehdi Taremi are the only players to win the award with two clubs.

== Winners ==
Key
†	Indicates a season with more than one top scorer
‡	Indicates player also won the European Golden Shoe in the same season
§	Denotes the club were Primeira Liga champions in the same season
^{↑}	Primeira Liga record

Primeira Liga Bola de Prata winners
Season	Player	Nationality	Club	Goals	Games	Rate
Campeonato da Liga da Primeira Divisão
1934–35	Manuel Soeiro	Portugal	Sporting CP	14	14	1.00
1935–36	Pinga	Portugal	Porto	21	14	1.50
1936–37	Manuel Soeiro (2)	Portugal	Sporting CP	24	12	2.00
1937–38	Fernando Peyroteo	Portugal	Sporting CP	34	14	2.43^{↑}
Campeonato Nacional da Primeira Divisão
1938–39	Costuras	Portugal	Porto^{§}	18	14	1.29
1939–40†	Fernando Peyroteo (2)	Portugal	Sporting CP	29	17	1.71
1939–40†	Slavko Kodrnja	Yugoslavia	Porto^{§}	29	18	1.61
1940–41	Fernando Peyroteo (3)	Portugal	Sporting CP^{§}	29	14	2.07
1941–42	Correia Dias	Portugal	Porto	36	21	1.71
1942–43	Julinho	Portugal	Benfica^{§}	24	16	1.50
1943–44	Francisco Rodrigues	Portugal	Vitória de Setúbal	28	18	1.56
1944–45	Francisco Rodrigues (2)	Portugal	Vitória de Setúbal	21	17	1.24
1945–46	Fernando Peyroteo (4)	Portugal	Sporting CP	39	21	1.86
1946–47	Fernando Peyroteo (5)	Portugal	Sporting CP^{§}	33	19	1.26
1947–48	António Araújo	Portugal	Porto	36	25	1.44
1948–49	Fernando Peyroteo (6)	Portugal	Sporting CP^{§}	30	23	1.74
1949–50	Julinho (2)	Portugal	Benfica^{§}	28	22	1.27
1950–51	Manuel Vasques	Portugal	Sporting CP^{§}	29	23	1.26
1951–52	José Águas	Portugal	Benfica	28	22	1.27
1952–53	Matateu	Portugal	Belenenses	29	26	1.12
1953–54	João Martins	Portugal	Sporting CP^{§}	31	23	1.35
1954–55	Matateu (2)	Portugal	Belenenses	32	26	1.23
1955–56	José Águas (2)	Portugal	Benfica	28	26	1.08
1956–57	José Águas (3)	Portugal	Benfica^{§}	30	25	1.20
1957–58	Arsénio Duarte	Portugal	CUF	23	21	1.10
1958–59	José Águas (4)	Portugal	Benfica^{§}	26	24	1.08
1959–60	Edmur Ribeiro	Brazil	Vitória de Guimarães	25	25	1.00
1960–61	José Águas (5)	Portugal	Benfica^{§}	27	23	1.17
1961–62	Azumir Veríssimo	Brazil	Porto	23	20	1.15
1962–63	José Augusto Torres	Portugal	Benfica^{§}	26	21	1.24
1963–64	Eusébio	Portugal	Benfica^{§}	28	19	1.47
1964–65	Eusébio (2)	Portugal	Benfica^{§}	28	20	1.40
1965–66†	Eusébio (3)	Portugal	Benfica	25	23	1.09
1965–66†	Ernesto Figueiredo	Portugal	Sporting CP^{§}	25	26	0.96
1966–67	Eusébio (4)	Portugal	Benfica^{§}	31	26	1.19
1967–68	Eusébio‡ (5)	Portugal	Benfica^{§}	42	24	1.75
1968–69	Manuel António	Portugal	Académica de Coimbra	19	26	0.73
1969–70	Eusébio (6)	Portugal	Benfica	20	22	0.91
1970–71	Artur Jorge	Portugal	Benfica^{§}	23	26	0.88
1971–72	Artur Jorge (2)	Portugal	Benfica^{§}	27	26	1.04
1972–73	Eusébio‡ (7)	Portugal	Benfica^{§}	40	28	1.43
1973–74	Héctor Yazalde‡	Argentina	Sporting CP^{§}	46^{↑}	29	1.59
1974–75	Héctor Yazalde (2)	Argentina	Sporting CP	30	26	1.15
1975–76	Rui Jordão	Portugal	Benfica^{§}	30	28	1.07
1976–77	Fernando Gomes	Portugal	Porto	26	28	0.93
1977–78	Fernando Gomes (2)	Portugal	Porto^{§}	25	25	1.00
1978–79	Fernando Gomes (3)	Portugal	Porto^{§}	27	29	0.93
1979–80	Rui Jordão (2)	Portugal	Sporting CP^{§}	31	30	1.03
1980–81	Nené	Portugal	Benfica^{§}	20	29	0.69
1981–82	Jacques Pereira	Portugal	Porto	27	30	0.90
1982–83	Fernando Gomes‡ (4)	Portugal	Porto	36	29	1.24
1983–84†	Fernando Gomes (5)	Portugal	Porto	21	23	0.91
1983–84†	Nené (2)	Portugal	Benfica^{§}	21	26	0.81
1984–85	Fernando Gomes‡ (6)	Portugal	Porto^{§}	39	30	1.30
1985–86	Manuel Fernandes	Portugal	Sporting CP	30	29	1.03
1986–87	Paulinho Cascavel	Brazil	Vitória de Guimarães	22	30	0.73
1987–88	Paulinho Cascavel (2)	Brazil	Sporting CP	23	38	0.61
1988–89	Vata	Angola	Benfica^{§}	16	27	0.59
1989–90	Mats Magnusson	Sweden	Benfica	33	32	1.03
1990–91	Rui Águas	Portugal	Benfica^{§}	25	37	0.68
1991–92	Ricky	Nigeria	Boavista	30	34	0.88
1992–93	Jorge Cadete	Portugal	Sporting CP	18	34	0.53
1993–94	Rashidi Yekini	Nigeria	Vitória de Setúbal	21	28	0.75
1994–95	Hassan Nader	Morocco	Farense	21	31	0.68
1995–96	Domingos	Portugal	Porto^{§}	25	29	0.86
1996–97	Mário Jardel	Brazil	Porto^{§}	30	31	0.97
1997–98	Mário Jardel (2)	Brazil	Porto^{§}	26	30	0.87
1998–99	Mário Jardel‡ (3)	Brazil	Porto^{§}	36	32	1.13
1999–2000	Mário Jardel (4)	Brazil	Porto	37	32	1.16
2000–01	Pena	Brazil	Porto	22	29	0.76
2001–02	Mário Jardel‡ (5)	Brazil	Sporting CP^{§}	42	30	1.40
2002–03†	Fary Faye	Senegal	Beira-Mar	18	31	0.58
2002–03†	Simão Sabrosa	Portugal	Benfica	18	33	0.55
2003–04	Benni McCarthy	South Africa	Porto^{§}	20	29	0.69
2004–05	Liédson	Brazil	Sporting CP	25	31	0.81
2005–06	Albert Meyong	Cameroon	Belenenses	17	26	0.65
2006–07	Liédson (2)	Brazil	Sporting CP	15	28	0.54
2007–08	Lisandro López	Argentina	Porto^{§}	24	27	0.89
2008–09	Nenê	Brazil	Nacional	20	28	0.71
2009–10	Óscar Cardozo	Paraguay	Benfica^{§}	26	29	0.90
2010–11	Hulk	Brazil	Porto^{§}	23	26	0.88
2011–12†	Óscar Cardozo (2)	Paraguay	Benfica	20	29	0.69
2011–12†	Lima	Brazil	Braga	20	30	0.67
2012–13	Jackson Martínez	Colombia	Porto^{§}	26	30	0.87
2013–14	Jackson Martínez (2)	Colombia	Porto	20	30	0.67
2014–15	Jackson Martínez (3)	Colombia	Porto	21	30	0.70
2015–16	Jonas	Brazil	Benfica^{§}	32	34	0.94
2016–17	Bas Dost	Netherlands	Sporting CP	34	31	1.10
2017–18	Jonas (2)	Brazil	Benfica	34	29	1.17
2018–19	Haris Seferovic	Switzerland	Benfica^{§}	23	29	0.79
2019–20†	Carlos Vinícius	Brazil	Benfica	18 (Note: A Bola considers that Vinícius scored 19 goals, while Liga Portugal lists the player as having scored 18.)	32	0.56
2019–20†	Mehdi Taremi	Iran	Rio Ave	18	30	0.60
2019–20†	Pizzi	Portugal	Benfica	18	32	0.56
2020–21	Pedro Gonçalves	Portugal	Sporting CP^{§}	23	32	0.72
2021–22	Darwin Núñez	Uruguay	Benfica	26	28	0.93
2022–23	Mehdi Taremi (2)	Iran	Porto	22	33	0.67
2023–24	Viktor Gyökeres	Sweden	Sporting CP^{§}	29	33	0.88
2024–25	Viktor Gyökeres (2)	Sweden	Sporting CP^{§}	39	33	1.18
2025–26	Luis Suárez	Colombia	Sporting CP	28	32	0.88

== Statistics ==
=== Multiple winners ===
Player	Club	Titles	Seasons
(Portugal) Eusébio	Benfica	7	1963–64, 1964–65, 1965–66 (shared), 1966–67, 1967–68, 1969–70, 1972–73
(Portugal) Fernando Peyroteo	Sporting CP	6	1937–38, 1939–40 (shared), 1940–41, 1945–46, 1946–47, 1948–49
(Portugal) Fernando Gomes	Porto	6	1976–77, 1977–78, 1978–79, 1982–83, 1983–84 (shared), 1984–85
(Portugal) José Águas	Benfica	5	1951–52, 1955–56, 1956–57, 1958–59, 1960–61
(Brazil) Mário Jardel	Porto, Sporting CP	5	1996–97, 1997–98, 1998–99, 1999–2000, 2001–02
(Colombia) Jackson Martínez	Porto	3	2012–13, 2013–14, 2014–15
(Portugal) Manuel Soeiro	Sporting CP	2	1934–35, 1936–37
(Portugal) Julinho	Benfica	2	1942–43, 1959–50
(Portugal) Matateu	Belenenses	2	1952–53, 1954–55
(Portugal) Artur Jorge	Benfica	2	1970–71, 1971–72
(Argentina) Héctor Yazalde	Sporting CP	2	1973–74, 1974–75
(Portugal) Rui Jordão	Benfica, Sporting CP	2	1975–76, 1979–80
(Portugal) Nené	Benfica	2	1980–81, 1983–84 (shared)
(Brazil) Paulinho Cascavel	Vitória de Guimarães, Sporting CP	2	1986–87, 1987–88
(Brazil) Liédson	Sporting CP	2	2004–05, 2006–07
(Paraguay) Óscar Cardozo	Benfica	2	2009–10, 2011–12 (shared)
(Brazil) Jonas	Benfica	2	2015–16, 2017–18
(Iran) Mehdi Taremi	Rio Ave, Porto	2	2019–20 (shared), 2022–23
(Sweden) Viktor Gyökeres	Sporting CP	2	2023–24, 2024–25

=== Awards won by nationality ===
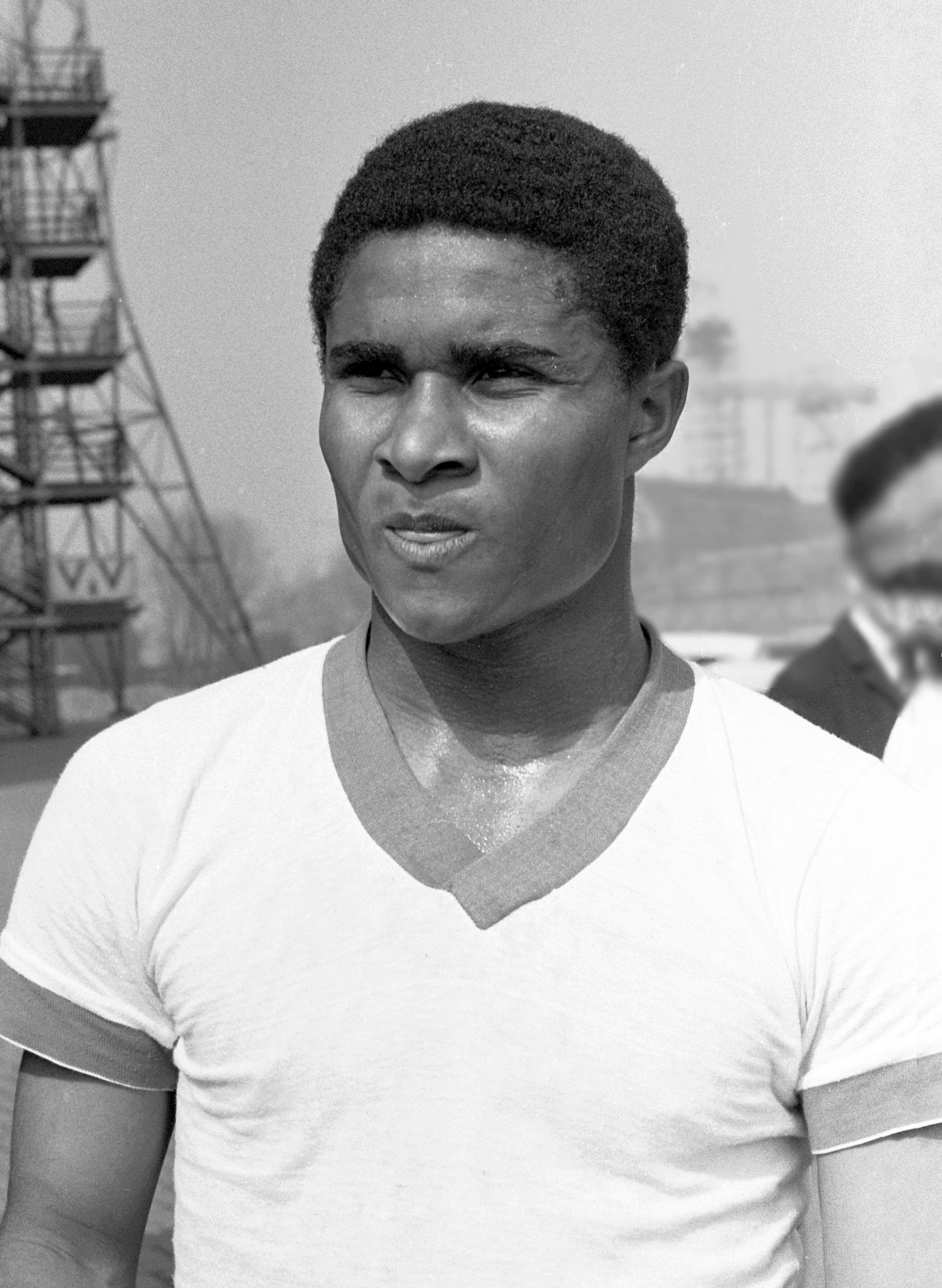
Eusébio won the Bola de Prata a record seven times.

Country	Total
Portugal	56
Brazil	18
Colombia	4
Argentina	3
Sweden	3
Nigeria	2
Iran	2
Paraguay	2
Yugoslavia	1
Angola	1
Morocco	1
Senegal	1
South Africa	1
Cameroon	1
Netherlands	1
Switzerland	1
Uruguay	1

=== Awards won by club ===
Club	Total
Benfica	32
Porto	26
Sporting CP	25
Vitória de Setúbal	3
Belenenses	3
Vitória de Guimarães	2
Académica de Coimbra	1
CUF	1
Boavista	1
Farense	1
Beira-Mar	1
Nacional	1
Braga	1
Rio Ave	1

== See also ==
- List of Primeira Liga top scorers
