= Cladonia anaemica =

Scientific classification
- Kingdom: Fungi
- Division: Ascomycota
- Class: Lecanoromycetes
- Order: Lecanorales
- Family: Cladoniaceae
- Genus: Cladonia
- Species: C. anaemica

Binomial name
- Cladonia anaemica (Nyl.) Ahti (2000)

Synonyms
- Cladonia sanguinea f. anaemica Nyl. (1860); Cladonia sanguinea var. anaemica (Nyl.) Nyl. (1860); Cladonia miniata var. anaemica (Nyl.) Vain. (1887); Cladonia miniata f. anaemica (Nyl.) Vain. (1899)

Species of lichen-forming fungus

Cladonia anaemica is a species of fruticose lichen in the family Cladoniaceae. It has a persistent base of small, pale greenish scales (squamules) marked with distinctive red patches at their tips, and produces slender upright stalks (podetia). The species is locally common on bare sands, thin soil, and quartzitic outcrops in eastern Brazil, and has also been recorded from Uruguay. It was first described by William Nylander in 1860 as an infraspecific taxon within Cladonia sanguinea, and was raised to species rank by Teuvo Ahti in 2000.

== Taxonomy ==
Cladonia anaemica was formalized at species rank by Teuvo Ahti (2000) as a new combination based on the epithet anaemica, which William Nylander had introduced in 1860 within Cladonia sanguinea. In the protologue, Nylander described anaemica as a paler taxon with smaller, shorter, more lobed squamules that were white inside, sometimes only faintly cinnabar-tinged, while the apothecia remained like those of the typical form. He added that the podetia were often even shorter than in the typical form, sometimes reduced to small stalks or absent altogether, and reported the taxon from Brazil and New Granada (now Colombia), usually on decaying trunks.

In 1887, Edvard Vainio transferred the taxon to C. miniata var. anaemica. He described the variety as having a moderately developed primary thallus with whitish to faintly reddish squamules and very variable podetia, which could be erect or decumbent, well developed or nearly absent. Vainio also reported it from Brazil, Venezuela, Colombia, and Ecuador, where it grew on trunks and on soil.

After a lectotype from Brazil was designated by Soili Stenroos in 1989, Ahti separated the taxon from C. miniata. Additional Brazilian fieldwork showed consistent differences: the primary squamules are pale (often whitish) with red spots at their tips, and the stalks (podetia) are slender and cylindrical, resembling those of C. secundana, which lacks the red pigmentation in the primary thallus. Chemical profiles vary, but specimens usually contain barbatic or, less often, sekikaic acid, with a red pigment present at squamule tips; these features support its treatment as a distinct species.

== Description ==
Cladonia anaemica has a persistent primary thallus made of small, leaf-like scales (squamules) that typically measure 3–4 (rarely up to 8) × 1–3 mm. The upper surface is pale green to brown (often appearing whitish in the field) and is characteristically marked with numerous red patches, especially at the tips of the squamules. The underside is black, and the bases can turn black to orange-brown as they age. The upright stalks (podetia) are sparingly developed and cylindrical (terete), greenish brown, 0.7–1 cm tall and 0.2–0.5 mm thick. They start simple and club-shaped but soon branch near the tips. Their surface is almost smoothly corticate (with a thin outer "skin", or cortex), slightly cracked and somewhat shiny, usually with a light sprinkling of tiny scales. In section, the wall is 300–380 μm thick with a glassy cortex 50–80 μm, a white medulla 50–70 μm (rarely with red patches), and a stereome 120–190 μm that is white to orange-brown; the central canal is shallowly grooved and dark brown.

Asexual structures are frequent: small, pear-shaped conidiomata on the primary thallus or near podetial tips are black to red and usually about 200 × 100 μm, often filled with red slime; they produce slender, sickle-shaped conidia 7–9 × 1 μm. Sexual structures are also common: red apothecial disks 0.2–0.7 mm wide often develop in tight clusters (corymbs), and the ascospores are spindle-shaped, 10–12 × 2–3.5 μm.

Chemically, the species is variable. Spot tests are P– and K– to K+ (violet). The major secondary metabolite is usually barbatic acid, though some specimens have sekikaic acid; minor or occasional constituents include 4'-O-methylnorsekikaic, 4-O-demethylbarbatic, and 3-α-hydroxybarbatic acids, and other unidentified substances. A red pigment occurs at the tips of the primary squamules.

== Habitat and distribution ==
Cladonia anaemica is known from eastern Brazil, where it has been recorded in the states of Alagoas, Minas Gerais, and São Paulo. It is locally common on open, nutrient-poor substrates, especially bare sands, very thin soil over rock, and quartzitic outcrops. In Minas Gerais it has been collected at upland sites such as the Serra de São José and the Caraça area, at elevations between roughly 800 and 1,200 m (2,600 and 3,900 ft), and also near Lima Duarte. In 2003, the species was added to the lichen flora of Uruguay after being recorded from Castillos, then the southernmost record in South America. Nylander's protologue also cited material from New Granada (now Colombia), and Vainio subsequently reported it from Venezuela and Ecuador.

== See also ==
- List of Cladonia species
- List of lichens of Brazil
