= Bola de Prata =

Bola de Prata (Portuguese for Silver Ball) may refer to:

- Bola de Prata (Brazil), an annual award given by Placar magazine to the best Série A players from each position
- Bola de Prata (Portugal), a Primeira Liga award for the league top scorer
