= Barata =

Barata may refer to:

== Places ==
- Barata (Lycaonia), an ancient town in present-day Turkey
- Barata, Kenya, a settlement in Kenya
- Barata, Rio de Janeiro, a sub-district of Realengo, Rio de Janeiro, Brazil
- Barata (river), a river in Svishtov Municipality, Bulgaria

== People ==
Barata (Portuguese pronunciation: [ba'ɾatɐ], meaning cockroach), is a Portuguese surname.

- Ahmed Hassan Barata, Nigerian politician
- Cipriano Barata (1762–1838), Brazilian physician and politician
- Jaime Martins Barata (1899–1970), Portuguese painter and scholar
- José Barata-Moura (born 1948), Portuguese philosopher
- Larissa Barata (born 1987), Brazilian gymnast
- Rodolfo Barata (born 1987), Portuguese footballer
- Samuel Barata (born 1993), Portuguese runner
- Vítor Barata (born 1996), Portuguese footballer
- Barata (footballer, born 1899), Brazilian footballer
- Barata (footballer, born 1972), João Maria Menezes Bezerra, Brazilian forward

== See also ==
- Bharata (disambiguation)
