= Jorge Andrade (disambiguation) =

Jorge Andrade (born 1978) is a Portuguese former footballer.

Jorge Andrade may also refer to:

- Jorge Andrade (footballer, born 1963) (born 1963), Brazilian footballer
- Jorge Andrade (playwright) (1922–1984), Brazilian playwright
- Jorge Carrera Andrade (1902–1978), Ecuadorian poet, historian and diplomat
- Jorge Carrera Andrade Award, an Ecuadorian literary award
