= 1976–77 Primeira Divisão =

43rd season of top-tier Portuguese football

Primeira Liga
- Season: 1976–77
- Champions: Benfica; 23rd title
- Relegated: Beira-Mar; Montijo; Leixões; Atlético CP
- European Cup: Benfica
- Cup Winners' Cup: F.C. Porto
- UEFA Cup: Sporting CP; Boavista
- Matches: 240
- Goals: 616 (2.57 per match)
- Top goalscorer: Fernando Gomes (26 goals)

The 1976–77 Primeira Divisão was the 43rd season of top-tier football in Portugal.

== Overview ==
It was contested by 16 teams, and S.L. Benfica won the championship.

== League standings ==
Pos	Team	Pld	W	D	L	GF	GA	GD	Pts	Qualification or relegation
1	Benfica (C)	30	23	5	2	67	24	+43	51	Qualification to European Cup first round
2	Sporting CP	30	17	8	5	59	26	+33	42	Qualification to UEFA Cup first round
3	Porto	30	18	5	7	72	27	+45	41	Qualification to Cup Winners' Cup first round (Note: Porto qualified for the Cup Winners' Cup as winners of the 1978 Taça de Portugal Final.)
4	Boavista	30	13	8	9	41	33	+8	34	Qualification to UEFA Cup first round
5	Académica	30	14	6	10	29	25	+4	34	
6	Vitória de Setúbal	30	13	6	11	47	46	+1	32	
7	Varzim	30	10	11	9	36	36	0	31	
8	Braga	30	10	9	11	36	36	0	29	
9	Vitória de Guimarães	30	10	6	14	39	38	+1	26	
10	Belenenses	30	7	12	11	29	40	−11	26	
11	Estoril	30	6	13	11	26	36	−10	25	
12	Portimonense	30	8	9	13	34	46	−12	25	
13	Beira-Mar (R)	30	7	9	14	33	57	−24	23	Relegation to Segunda Divisão
14	Montijo (R)	30	7	9	14	30	47	−17	23	Relegation to Segunda Divisão
15	Leixões (R)	30	4	15	11	15	31	−16	23	Relegation to Segunda Divisão
16	Atlético CP (R)	30	3	9	18	23	68	−45	15	Relegation to Segunda Divisão

Source: RSSSF
(C) Champions; (R) Relegated

== Results ==
Home \ Away	ACA	ACP	BEM	BEL	BEN	BOA	BRA	EST	LEI	MON	PTM	POR	SCP	VAR	VGU	VSE
Académica		0–0	0–0	3–1	0–1	3–1	0–1	1–0	0–0	2–1	3–2	0–0	2–1	1–0	2–1	3–0
Atlético CP	0–1		4–1	2–1	0–2	1–4	0–2	1–1	0–0	1–0	1–2	1–1	0–1	0–0	0–2	2–5
Beira-Mar	1–2	1–1		1–0	2–2	1–2	4–2	2–1	2–0	4–1	2–2	0–3	1–1	0–0	1–0	1–2
Belenenses	1–0	2–1	3–0		2–3	1–1	2–0	1–1	1–1	1–2	3–2	2–0	0–1	0–0	1–1	0–1
Benfica	1–0	6–0	4–0	1–1		2–1	2–2	6–1	3–1	4–1	5–1	3–1	2–1	2–0	1–0	3–1
Boavista	4–1	6–2	0–0	0–1	0–3		1–1	1–0	1–1	2–0	2–0	2–1	0–0	2–3	2–1	1–0
Braga	2–0	2–0	3–0	1–1	0–1	0–1		1–1	0–0	1–0	3–1	0–3	3–1	0–0	4–1	3–0
Estoril	0–1	1–1	0–0	1–1	1–1	3–1	3–1		2–0	1–0	2–0	2–1	0–1	1–1	0–0	1–3
Leixões	1–2	0–0	0–1	0–0	1–2	1–1	1–0	1–1		1–0	0–0	0–0	1–2	1–0	2–1	1–1
Montijo	0–0	6–0	3–0	1–0	0–1	1–0	0–0	0–0	1–0		2–2	1–1	1–1	2–2	1–0	0–2
Portimonense	1–0	3–0	2–1	2–2	1–2	1–3	0–0	2–1	3–0	0–0		0–2	2–2	2–1	2–1	0–0
Porto	2–0	8–2	5–2	8–0	0–1	2–0	5–2	0–0	4–0	7–0	3–0		4–1	2–1	4–2	3–1
Sporting CP	2–0	0–0	4–0	4–0	3–0	0–0	4–1	5–0	0–0	2–0	2–0	3–0		1–1	3–2	6–1
Varzim	1–0	2–1	1–1	0–0	0–1	2–0	2–0	1–0	0–0	7–2	1–1	1–0	3–4		3–1	2–1
Vitória de Guimarães	0–0	5–0	4–1	0–0	1–1	0–0	1–0	2–1	2–0	3–2	1–0	0–1	1–3	3–0		3–2
Vitória de Setúbal	0–2	3–2	5–3	2–1	2–1	1–2	1–1	0–0	1–1	2–2	1–0	0–1	1–0	7–1	1–0	

Legend: Blue = home team win; Yellow = draw; Red = away team win.

== Season statistics ==
=== Top goalscorers ===
Rank	Player	Club	Goals
1	(Portugal) Fernando Gomes	Porto	26
2	(Portugal) Nené	Benfica	22
3	(Portugal) Manuel Fernandes	Sporting	21
4	(Brazil) Mirobaldo	Vitória de Setúbal	15
5	(Mali) Salif Keïta	Sporting	14
5	(Portugal) Celso Pita	Boavista	14
7	(Portugal) Horácio de Faria	Varzim	13
7	(Portugal) Joaquim Rocha	Académica de Coimbra	13
7	(Portugal) Tito	Vitória de Guimarães	13
10	(Portugal) Jacinto João	Vitória de Setúbal	12
10	(Portugal) Chico Bolota	Montijo	12
