= Ademir (footballer, born 1951) =

Brazilian footballer

Personal information
- Full name: Ademir Vieira
- Date of birth: 18 October 1951 (age 75)
- Place of birth: São Paulo, Brazil
- Height: 1.71 m (5 ft 7 1/2 in)
- Position: Midfielder

Senior career*
Years	Team	Apps	(Gls)
1971–1972	Santo André		
1973–1975	Olhanense	72	(30)
1974	→ Toronto Metros (loan)	11	(3)
1975–1978	Porto	50	(22)
1978–1983	Celta de Vigo	66	(13)
1983–1985	Olhanense		
1985–1986	Louletano		
1986–1988	Imortal		
Total		199	(68)
- * Club domestic league appearances and goals

Ademir Vieira (born 18 October 1951), known as just Ademir is a retired Brazilian footballer.

== Career statistics ==
=== Club ===
Club	Season	League			Cup		Continental		Total	
Club	Season	Division	Apps	Goals	Apps	Goals	Apps	Goals	Apps	Goals
Olhanense	1972–73	Segunda Divisão	22	9	0	0	–		22	9
Olhanense	1973–74	Primeira Divisão	26	12	0	0	–		26	12
Olhanense	1974–75	Primeira Divisão	24	9	0	0	–		24	9
Olhanense	Total		72	30	0	0	0	0	72	30
Toronto Metros (loan)	1974	NASL	11	3	0	0	–		11	3
Porto	1975–76	Primeira Divisão	24	9	3 (Note: Appearances in the Taça de Portugal)	0	1 (Note: Appearances in the UEFA Cup)	0	28	9
Porto	1976–77	Primeira Divisão	9	4	4	2	1	0	14	6
Porto	1977–78	Primeira Divisão	24	12	4	2	1 (Note: Appearances in the UEFA Cup Winners' Cup)	0	29	14
Porto	Total		50	22	11	4	3	0	64	26
Celta de Vigo	1978–79	La Liga	4	1	0	0	0	0	4	1
Celta de Vigo	1979–80	Segunda División	28	10	0	0	0	0	28	10
Celta de Vigo	1981–82	Segunda División	31	2	0	0	0	0	31	2
Celta de Vigo	1982–83	La Liga	1	0	0	0	0	0	1	0
Celta de Vigo	Total		66	13	0	0	0	0	66	13
Career total			199	68	11	4	3	0	213	72
