= Arnaldo Silva =

Portuguese footballer (1944–1999)

Arnaldo
Personal information
- Full name: Arnaldo José da Silva
- Date of birth: 1 February 1944
- Place of birth: Bissau, Guinea
- Date of death: 24 May 1999 (aged 55)
- Place of death: Portugal
- Height: 1.78 m (5 ft 10 in)
- Position: Midfielder

Youth career
- Balantas

Senior career*
Years	Team	Apps	(Gls)
1963–1976	CUF	236	(45)
1965–1966	→ Vilanovense (loan)		
1966–1967	→ Leixões (loan)	20	(1)
1967–1968	→ Riopele (loan)		
1976–1977	Montijo	28	(1)
1977–1979	Barreirense	29	(8)
1979–1981	Amora	63	(18)
1981–1982	Barreirense	26	(5)
1982–1983	União Almeirim		
1983–1984	Estrela Vendas Novas		
1984–1986	Seixal		
1986–1987	Vilafradense		
Total		402+	(78+)

International career
1973	Portugal U21	1	(1)
1974	Portugal	1	(0)
- * Club domestic league appearances and goals

Arnaldo José da Silva (1 February 1944 – 24 May 1999), known simply as Arnaldo, was a Portuguese footballer who played as an attacking midfielder.
