= Duda (footballer, born 1947) =

Brazilian footballer (1947–2021)

Personal information
- Full name: José Francisco Leandro Filho
- Date of birth: 4 August 1947
- Place of birth: Maceió, Brazil
- Date of death: 11 June 2021 (aged 73)
- Place of death: Maceió, Brazil
- Position: Forward

Senior career*
Years	Team	Apps	(Gls)
1966	CSA		
1967–1968	Sport Recife		
1968–1969	CSA		
1970–1971	Sport Recife		
1971–1975	Vitória Setúbal	96	(54)
1975–1976	Sevilla	13	(1)
1976–1981	Porto	111	(35)
1981–1982	Vitória Setúbal	9	(0)
1982–1983	Famalicão		
1983–1984	Oliveira Douro		
1984–1985	Resende		
1985–1986	Cachão		
1986–1987	Resende		
Total		229+	(90+)
- * Club domestic league appearances and goals

José Francisco Leandro Filho (4 August 1947 – 11 July 2021), known as Duda, was a Brazilian footballer who played as a forward.

He spent most of his professional career in Portugal, totalling 216 games and 89 goals in the Primeira Liga for Vitória Setúbal and Porto, winning the league twice and a Taça de Portugal with the latter club. He also played one season in Spain's La Liga for Sevilla.

== Career ==
Born in Maceió in the state of Alagoas, Duda began his career with local CSA before moving to Sport Recife. He was the top scorer of the Campeonato Pernambucano with 12 goals in 1971.

Duda joined Vitória Setúbal in the Portuguese Primeira Liga, finishing as league runner-up in his debut season of 1971–72. He scored five goals in seven games in a run to the quarter-finals of the UEFA Cup in 1972–73, including one in a 2–0 win over Inter Milan at the Estádio do Bonfim on 29 November in the first leg of the last 16.

After spending 1975–76 with Sevilla in Spain's La Liga. Duda returned to Portugal's top flight in 1976, at Porto, and won the Taça de Portugal in his first season. On 19 October 1977, in the second round of the UEFA Cup Winners' Cup, he scored a hat-trick in a 4–0 win over Manchester United at the Estádio das Antas. Porto finished the league season as champions for the first time in 19 years, and won another title the following season. On 3 October 1979, he scored the only goal of a European Cup first round tie against AC Milan, in the second leg at the San Siro; he shot a direct free kick past Enrico Albertosi.

For 1981–82, Duda returned to Vitória. He ended his career in the lower leagues for clubs including Oliveira do Douro.

== Death ==
Duda died in his hometown on 11 July 2021, aged 73.
