= Djão =

Portuguese footballer (1958–2023)

Personal information
- Full name: João Marques de Jesus Lopes
- Date of birth: 16 August 1958
- Place of birth: Tete, Portuguese East Africa
- Date of death: 7 January 2023 (aged 64)
- Position: Forward

Youth career
- 1972–1975: Desportivo de Tete
- 1976: Textáfrica

Senior career*
Years	Team	Apps	(Gls)
1977	Textáfrica		
1977–1979	Chaves		
1979–1987	Belenenses		
1987–1990	Penafiel	96	(14)
1990–1991	Marco		
1991–1994	Rebordosa		

International career
1981	Portugal	1	(0)
- * Club domestic league appearances and goals

João Marques de Jesus Lopes (16 August 1958 – 7 January 2023), known as Djão, was a Portuguese professional footballer who played as a forward.

Djão died on 7 January 2023, at the age of 64.
