= Gilmar Estevam =

Brazilian footballer (born 1967)

Personal information
- Full name: Gilmar Estevam
- Date of birth: 11 April 1967 (age 59)
- Place of birth: Belo Horizonte
- Position: Forward

Senior career*
Years	Team	Apps	(Gls)
1992–1994	São Paulo		
1993	→ Chaves		
1994–1999	Vitória		
1999–2000	Boavista		
2000–2001	Chaves		
- * Club domestic league appearances and goals

Gilmar Estevam (born 11 April 1967) is a retired Brazilian football striker.
