= Chico Gordo =

Angolan-Portuguese footballer

Personal information
- Full name: Bernardo Francisco da Silva
- Date of birth: 2 October 1949
- Place of birth: Lobito, Angola
- Date of death: 22 November 2000 (aged 51)
- Position: Forward

Senior career*
| Years | Team | Apps | (Gls) |
| 1968–1971 | Porto | 32 | (3) |
| 1971–1972 | Tirsense | 28 | (8) |
| 1974–1975 | Lusitânia Lourosa | 0 | (0) |
| 1975–1980 | Braga | 145 | (76) |
| 1980–1982 | Vitória de Setúbal | 48 | (13) |
| 1982–1983 | Beira-Mar | 1 | (0) |
- * Club domestic league appearances and goals

Bernardo Francisco da Silva, known as Chico Gordo (2 October 1949 – 22 November 2000) was an Angolan footballer who played as a forward. He also held Portuguese citizenship.

He played 11 seasons and 230 games in the Primeira Liga, mostly for Braga and also for Porto, Tirsense and Vitória de Setúbal. He made his professional debut in the Primeira Liga for Porto on 15 September 1968 in a 1–3 loss to Vitória de Setúbal.
