= Constantino Jardim =

Portuguese footballer

Constantino
Personal information
- Full name: Constantino Roberto Santos Jardim
- Date of birth: 15 November 1967 (age 58)
- Place of birth: Lubango, Angola
- Height: 1.70 m (5 ft 7 in)
- Position: Striker

Youth career
- 1981–1986: Salgueiros

Senior career*
| Years | Team | Apps | (Gls) |
| 1986–1990 | Salgueiros | 57 | (8) |
| 1990–1991 | Águeda | 33 | (6) |
| 1991–1992 | Aves | 11 | (1) |
| 1992–1993 | União Lamas | 34 | (21) |
| 1993–1998 | Leça | 146 | (57) |
| 1998–1999 | Levante | 37 | (9) |
| 2000 | Campomaiorense | 20 | (3) |
| 2001 | União Lamas | 11 | (2) |
| 2001–2004 | Leça | 60 | (22) |
| 2004–2005 | Tondela | | |
| 2005 | Santa Marta Penaguião | | |
| Total | | 409 | (129) |
- * Club domestic league appearances and goals

Constantino Roberto Santos Jardim, better known in football as Constantino or Tino Bala (Lubango, Angola, 15 November 1967), is a Portuguese former footballer who played as a striker. He is regarded as one of the iconic figures of top-flight Portuguese football in the 1990s and holds the record as the all-time leading goalscorer in the history of Leça Futebol Clube in the Portuguese Primeira Liga.

He is the nephew of Seninho, the legendary winger who made his name playing for FC Porto and the New York Cosmos. He arrived in Portugal at the age of seven in 1975 as a refugee from the Angolan Civil War. He earned the famous nickname "Tino Bala" due to his explosive pace and ability to fire shots on goal.

== Playing career ==
Constantino began his football journey at the age of six in FC Porto's youth academy before moving to Sport Comércio e Salgueiros, where he completed his development. He made his debut for the first team in Portugal's top division at just 17 years of age.

He later spent loan spells with Recreio Desportivo de Águeda—where he was coached by Mário Wilson—and C.D. Aves, before enjoying a breakthrough season with União de Lamas in 1992–93, finishing as the top scorer of the II Divisão B with 28 goals.

In the summer of 1993, on the recommendation of FC Porto director Reinaldo Teles, he signed for Leça Futebol Clube. He became the main attacking weapon during the golden era of the Matosinhos club in the Portuguese top flight, helping the team secure promotion in 1995.

Constantino established himself as one of the league's most prolific goalscorers, regularly reaching double figures and competing alongside notable forwards such as Domingos Paciência and Nuno Gomes in the scoring charts. He won a Bronze Boot award after scoring 15 goals in a single league season.

Throughout his spell at Leça FC, he scored a total of 42 goals in the Primeira Liga, making him the club's all-time leading goalscorer in the top division. Overall, he recorded 140 appearances and 48 goals in Portugal's highest football tier.

=== Move to Spain and return ===
During the 1998–99 season, Constantino moved to Spain to join Levante UD. He made an immediate impact and was nicknamed "Little Romário" by supporters. He became one of the heroes of the campaign, helping the Valencia-based club secure promotion to Spain's Segunda División.

In January 2000, he returned to Portugal to sign for Campomaiorense at the request of manager Carlos Manuel. He quickly became a key attacking figure, scoring crucial goals that helped the club secure enough points to remain in the Primeira Liga.

He later finished his professional career after further spells with Leça FC, C.D. Tondela—where he won a district championship at the age of 37—and Santa Marta de Penaguião.

=== International call-Up and family tragedy ===
As a result of his success in Portuguese football, Constantino received an official call-up from coach Professor Neca to represent the Angola national football team.

However, while attending the national team's training camp in Angola, he received news that his daughter, Maria Inês, had been seriously injured in a road accident and was in a coma. Released by the coaching staff, he immediately returned to Portugal to support his family and therefore never made an official appearance for the Palancas Negras.

== Coaching career ==
After retiring from professional football, Constantino returned to the game as an assistant coach at Leça FC, helping the club achieve promotion from the Third Division to the Second Division B.

Later, alongside coach Madureira, he joined the youth coaching staff of Boavista FC. During approximately four years with the club's junior teams, he played an active role in developing young talents, including future Portuguese international Bruno Fernandes.

In regional senior football, he also worked as both assistant and head coach for clubs such as Canidelo, Vila FC, Foz SAD and Avintes, alongside Abílio Novais.

== Life after football ==
Away from football, Constantino established himself as a businessman in Leça da Palmeira, where he owned and operated both a restaurant and a bar.

He later joined Matosinhos Sport, the municipal sports company, where he has been actively involved in the management and coordination of local sports facilities.

== Sources ==
- "Tino Bala: The war refugee who became a symbol of Leça's golden years" – O Blog do David (2021).
- "Tino Bala: From Leça goalscorer to sports facilities manager" – MaisFutebol.
- "Historical Tribute to Tino Bala" – Official Leça FC historical records publication.
