= Fary Faye =

Senegalese footballer (born 1974)

Personal information
- Date of birth: 24 December 1974 (age 51)
- Place of birth: Dakar, Senegal
- Height: 1.80 m (5 ft 11 in)
- Position: Striker

Senior career*
| Years | Team | Apps | (Gls) |
| 1992–1996 | ASC Jaraaf | 75 | (28) |
| 1996–1998 | União Montemor | 58 | (39) |
| 1998–2003 | Beira-Mar | 152 | (61) |
| 2003–2008 | Boavista | 92 | (14) |
| 2008–2010 | Beira-Mar | 27 | (4) |
| 2010–2011 | Aves | 9 | (1) |
| 2011–2015 | Boavista | 75 | (30) |
| Total | | 488 | (177) |

International career
| 2000–2001 | Senegal | 4 | (0) |
- * Club domestic league appearances and goals

Fary Faye (born 24 December 1974) is a Senegalese former professional footballer who played as a striker.

He spent most of his career in Portugal (19 years), most notably with Beira-Mar and Boavista. At one point he ranked in the country's Primeira Liga scoring list's Top 5, eventually amassing competition totals of 222 matches and 68 goals over ten seasons.

== Club career ==
Born in Dakar, Fary began his career with ASC Jaraaf in his native country, then started his Portuguese adventure in 1996, signing with lowly União Montemor alongside his compatriot and teammate Khadim Faye and remaining with the third division club for two seasons, before moving to S.C. Beira-Mar.

From 1998 to 2003, Fary was an ever-present fixture in the top scorer's list in Portugal, hitting an average of one goal every three games in the Primeira Liga. In the 2002–03 campaign he became top scorer netting 18 times for the Aveiro team, which finished 13th.

Fary signed for Boavista F.C. in summer 2003, but his role gradually diminished compared to his previous spell. In 2006–07 he went scoreless in 23 appearances, although only three of those were as a starter.

In July 2008, upon Boavista's relegation to the Segunda Liga, Fary returned to his first Portuguese professional club Beira-Mar, also in that tier. After appearing rarely as the team returned to the top flight in 2010 after a three-year absence – four matches, no goals – the 35-year-old joined another side in the nation, C.D. Aves.

Fary represented Boavista from 2011 to 2015, with the better part of that spell being spent in the third division. On 2 July 2015, immediately after retiring, the 40-year-old was named their new director of football.

On 7 May 2024, Fary was elected president of Boavista. He was still in charge when, at the end of the 2024–25 season, the club was relegated from the main division to the regional ones due to severe economic problems.

== International career ==
Fary was part of the Senegal squad at the 2000 African Cup of Nations which reached the quarter-finals, losing to Nigeria.

== Honours ==
Beira-Mar

- Taça de Portugal: 1998–99
- Segunda Liga: 2009–10

Individual

- Primeira Liga top scorer: 2002–03
