= Edmilson (footballer, born 1968) =

Brazilian footballer

Personal information
- Full name: Edmilson Dias de Lucena
- Date of birth: 29 May 1968 (age 58)
- Place of birth: Emas, Brazil
- Height: 1.84 m (6 ft 0 in)
- Position: Forward

Senior career*
Years	Team	Apps	(Gls)
1988	Matsubara		
1988–1991	Nacional	86	(23)
1991–1997	Maritimo	145	(48)
1997–2000	Vitória Guimarães	88	(29)
2000–2001	Braga	37	(12)
2001–2002	Al-Hilal	26	(6)
2002–2005	Jeonbuk Hyundai Motors	70	(31)
Total		452	(149)
- * Club domestic league appearances and goals

Edmilson Dias de Lucena (born 29 May 1968), known simply as Edmilson, is a Brazilian retired professional footballer who played as a forward.

== Career ==
Born in Emas, Paraíba, Edmilson arrived in Portugal at the age of 20, and would remain in the country for the following decade – exactly 13 full seasons plus the start of the 2001–02 campaign – always in the Primeira Liga. He started his career in Madeira, representing both C.D. Nacional and C.S. Marítimo.

In 1997 Edmilson moved to Vitória de Guimarães, scoring six goals in his debut season as the Minho side finished in third position (he bettered that individual total in the following two years). In the summer of 2000, the 32-year-old stayed in the region after signing with S.C. Braga, and wasted no time in contributing, netting 11 times in a narrow miss on qualification to the UEFA Cup after a fourth-place finish.

Late into 2001, Edmilson had a brief spell with Al-Hilal FC after having appeared in 356 matches in the Portuguese top flight and scored 112 goals. He finished his career at the age of 37 after a three-year spell with another Asian team, South Korea's Jeonbuk Hyundai Motors.

== Honours ==
- Asian Cup Winners' Cup: 2002
- Korean FA Cup: 2003, 2005
- Korean Super Cup: 2004

Individual

- Asian Cup Winners' Cup: MVP 2002
- K-League top scorer 2002
- K-League top assister 2003
- Korean FA Cup MVP: 2003
- Korean Super Cup MVP: 2004
