= Héctor Yazalde =

Argentine footballer (1946–1997)

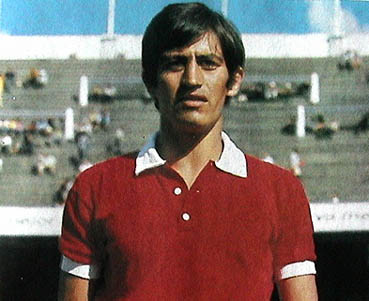
- Yazalde with Independiente in 1969

Personal information
- Full name: Héctor Casimiro Yazalde
- Date of birth: 29 May 1946
- Place of birth: Avellaneda, Argentina
- Date of death: 18 June 1997 (aged 51)
- Place of death: Buenos Aires, Argentina
- Height: 1.76 m (5 ft 9 in)
- Position: Striker

Senior career*
Years	Team	Apps	(Gls)
1962–1966	Piraña		
1967–1971	Independiente	112	(72)
1971–1975	Sporting CP	104	(104)
1975–1977	Marseille	44	(23)
1977–1981	Newell's Old Boys	120	(54)
1982	Huracán	2	(0)
Total		392	(253)

International career
1970–1974	Argentina	10	(2)

Managerial career
- 1986: Huracán
- * Club domestic league appearances and goals

Héctor Casimiro Yazalde (29 May 1946 – 18 June 1997) was an Argentine professional footballer who played as a striker.

Nicknamed Chirola, he scored 46 goals in one single season with Sporting CP, being awarded that season's European Golden Shoe. He appeared for five other clubs in a 19-year career.

Yazalde was part of the Argentina national team squad at the 1974 World Cup.

== Club career ==
Born in Avellaneda, Buenos Aires Province, Yazalde's beginnings in football were fortuitous: he was visiting a friend who played with Club Atlético Piraña, an amateur club in the Argentine capital. He asked to join the training session, immediately causing a stirring impression and signing the very day; from there, he moved to Club Atlético Independiente, going on to help the team win two Primera División championships.

Yazalde signed with Sporting CP ahead of the 1971–72 season, helping the Lisbon side to the 1974 Primeira Liga by scoring 46 goals in just 29 games, both a domestic and European record. The following campaign, with the Lions finishing third, he netted 30 times, league's best and Europe's second.

As a prize for the European Golden Shoe, Yazalde received a Toyota car which he sold, then sharing the money with his teammates. After his Portuguese spell, he successively represented Olympique de Marseille, Newell's Old Boys and Club Atlético Huracán, retiring in 1981 and becoming a player's agent in his country.

== International career ==
Yazalde earned ten caps for Argentina, appearing at the 1974 FIFA World Cup where he scored twice in three matches (both against Haiti, 4–1 win).

In spite of having returned to his country intent on being selected for the following tournament, to be held on home soil, and with the promise of Julio Grondona, head of the Argentine Football Association, that he would make the final squad, Yazalde was ultimately not picked and fell into a deep depression.

== Personal life ==
Yazalde was the sixth of eight children, and grew up in the same neighbourhood as Diego Maradona. He initially wanted to become a doctor, but as his family did not have the means to support this ambition, he began selling several items on street corners, returning home with his pockets full of small coins (known as chirolas, the singular form of the word later becoming his nickname).

Yazalde married Portuguese model/actress Maria do Carmo de Deus on 16 July 1973. Carmen – as he referred to her in Spanish, which stuck – had a brief career in acting in European cult films under the name Britt Nichols, but rarely spoke about this stage of her life since marrying the player.

Maria do Carmo came with Yazalde to Argentina to settle down, but the couple separated 14 years later though they never got legally divorced. They had one son, Gonçalo.

== Death ==
Yazalde died in Buenos Aires on 18 June 1997, from hemorrhage and heart failure. He was aged 51.

== Honours ==
Independiente

- Argentine Primera División: 1967–68, 1969–70

Sporting CP

- Primeira Liga: 1973–74
- Taça de Portugal: 1972–73, 1973–74

Marseille

- Coupe de France: 1975–76

Individual

- Argentine Footballer of the Year: 1970
- Primeira Liga top scorer: 1973–74, 1974–75
- European Golden Boot: 1974
