= Caraça =

Portuguese footballer (born 1932)

Personal information
- Full name: António Joaquim Caraça
- Date of birth: 7 February 1932 (age 94)
- Position: Forward

Youth career
- 1949–1950: Juventude Évora

Senior career*
| Years | Team | Apps | (Gls) |
| 1950–1952 | Benfica (reserves) | | |
| 1952–1954 | Vitória de Guimarães | 51 | (23) |
| 1954–1965 | Lusitano Évora | 221 | (73) |
- * Club domestic league appearances and goals

António Joaquim Caraça, known as Caraça (born 7 February 1932) is a Portuguese former footballer played as a forward. He played 13 seasons and 272 games in the Primeira Liga for Lusitano Évora and Vitória de Guimarães.

== Career ==
Caraça made his Primeira Liga debut for Vitória de Guimarães on 28 September 1952 in a game against Porto.
