= Paulinho Cascavel =

Brazilian footballer (born 1959)

Personal information
- Full name: Paulo Roberto Bacinello
- Date of birth: 29 September 1959 (age 67)
- Place of birth: Cascavel, Brazil
- Height: 1.85 m (6 ft 1 in)
- Position: Striker

Youth career
- 1977–1980: Pinheiros-PR

Senior career*
Years	Team	Apps	(Gls)
1980	Cascavel		
1982–1983	Criciúma	5	(0)
1984	Joinville		
1984	Fluminense		
1985	Porto	1	(0)
1985–1987	Vitória Guimarães	60	(47)
1987–1990	Sporting CP	94	(38)
1990–1991	Gil Vicente	8	(0)
Total		168+	(85+)
- * Club domestic league appearances and goals

Paulo Roberto Bacinello (born 29 September 1959), commonly known as Paulinho Cascavel, is a Brazilian former professional footballer who played as a striker.

He spent most of his career in Portugal, primarily with Vitória de Guimarães and Sporting CP.

== Club career ==
Born in Cascavel, Paraná, Cascavel (whose nickname stemmed from his birthplace) started his career with local amateurs Cascavel Esporte Clube, then played for Criciúma Esporte Clube, Joinville Esporte Clube and Fluminense FC. He made five appearances in the 1983 edition of the Campeonato Brasileiro Série B with Criciúma, and was top scorer of the following year's Campeonato Catarinense with 27 goals while with Joinville.

Cascavel moved to Portugal in December 1984, signing with Primeira Liga club FC Porto, but only played one game there. In the following season he joined Guimarães' Vitória SC, and scored 22 times in his second year – top scorer in the competition – as the Minho side finished in third place and qualified for the UEFA Cup.

For 1987–88, Cascavel was acquired by Sporting CP. He scored 24 goals during that campaign, but the Lisbon-based team finished fourth; he added six in as many matches in their quarter-final run in the UEFA Cup Winners' Cup.

Cascavel's numbers reduced significantly the following years, and he retired in June 1991 while still in Portugal with Gil Vicente FC.

== Personal life ==
Cascavel's son, Guilherme, also nicknamed Cascavel, was also a footballer and a striker. Born in Portugal, he too played mostly in the country, mainly in its Segunda Liga.

== Honours ==
Cascavel EC

- Campeonato Paranaense: 1980

Joinville

- Campeonato Catarinense: 1984

Fluminense

- Campeonato Carioca: 1984

Porto

- Primeira Liga: 1984–85

Sporting CP

- Supertaça Cândido de Oliveira: 1987

Individual

- Primeira Liga top scorer: 1986–87, 1987–88
- UEFA Cup Winners' Cup top scorer: 1987–88
