= Jacques Pereira =

Portuguese footballer (1955–2020)

Jacques
Personal information
- Full name: Jacques Pereira
- Date of birth: 3 February 1955
- Place of birth: Casablanca, Morocco
- Date of death: 3 November 2020 (aged 65)
- Place of death: Vila Real de Santo António, Portugal
- Position: Striker

Youth career
- 1970–1973: Lusitano
- 1973–1974: Farense

Senior career*
Years	Team	Apps	(Gls)
1974–1976	Farense	31	(12)
1976–1979	Famalicão		
1979–1981	Braga	51	(19)
1981–1985	Porto	63	(34)
1985–1987	Braga	30	(5)
1987–1988	Covilhã	21	(2)
1988–1991	Lusitano	45	(6)
1991–1994	Castromarinense		

International career
1981	Portugal	1	(0)
- * Club domestic league appearances and goals

Jacques Pereira (3 February 1955 – 3 November 2020), known simply as Jacques, was a Portuguese professional footballer who played as a striker.

== Football career ==
Born in Casablanca, Morocco to Portuguese parents, Jacques arrived in the Primeira Liga with S.C. Farense. After a spell in the second division with F.C. Famalicão, he returned to the top flight with S.C. Braga ahead of the 1979–80 campaign; his performances there attracted the attention of FC Porto, still without Fernando Gomes who had left for a two-year "exile" at Sporting de Gijón in Spain.

Jacques topped the scoring charts at 27 goals in his first season at the Estádio das Antas, although the team came out empty in silverware. Such performances earned him his sole cap for Portugal, which consisted of 45 minutes in a 5–2 friendly loss to Bulgaria in Haskovo.

Leaving Porto in 1985, barred by returned Gomes, Jacques returned to Braga on a two-year contract, then played one year with S.C. Covilhã also in the top tier. He eventually retired in 1994 at 39, after three years with Lusitano Futebol Clube – also his first club – and amateurs U.D. Castromarinense.

== Death ==
Jacques died on 3 November 2020 in his home of Vila Real de Santo António, from heart failure. He was 65 years old.
