= Jorge Andrade (footballer, born 1963) =

Brazilian footballer (born 1961)

Personal information
- Full name: Jorge Andrade Guimarães
- Date of birth: 18 April 1968 (age 58)
- Place of birth: Brazil
- Height: 1.80 m (5 ft 11 in)
- Position: Forward

Senior career*
Years	Team	Apps	(Gls)
1985–1987	Farense	37	(20)
1987–1991	Boavista	110	(43)
1991–1992	Porto	12	(2)
1992–1994	Marítimo	72	(24)
1994	Vitória de Setúbal	8	(2)
1995	Portuguesa	18	(2)
1995	Paços de Ferreira	16	(4)
1996	Machico		
1996–1997	Marítimo	1	(0)
1998	Blumenau		
- * Club domestic league appearances and goals

Jorge Andrade Guimarães (born 18 April 1968) is a Brazilian former professional footballer who played as a forward.

== Career ==
In 1985, Andrade signed for Portuguese side Farense. He helped the club achieve promotion. In 1987, he signed for Portuguese side Boavista. In 1991, he signed for Portuguese side Porto. In 1992, he signed for Portuguese side Marítimo. He was regarded as one of the club's most important players. In 1994, he signed for Portuguese side Vitória de Setúbal. In 1995, he signed for Portuguese side Portuguesa. After that, he signed for Portuguese side Paços de Ferreira. In 1996, he signed for Portuguese side Machico. After that, he signed for Portuguese side Marítimo.

== Personal life ==
After retiring from professional football, Andrade lived in Australia. He has played amateur football tournaments in Thailand.
