= Barata (footballer, born 1972) =

Brazilian footballer

Personal information
- Full name: João Maria Menezes Bezerra
- Date of birth: 5 June 1972 (age 54)
- Place of birth: Caraúbas, Brazil
- Position: Forward

Youth career
- –1994: ABC

Senior career*
Years	Team	Apps	(Gls)
1994–1995	ABC		
1996	Itaperuna		
1996–1997	Fluminense	31	(5)
1997–1998	Guarani		
1998–1999	Mérida	26	(17)
1999–2004	Tenerife	108	(37)
2001–2002	→ Braga (loan)	30	(15)
2004	Ponte Preta		
2005–2006	ABC		
2006	América-RN		
2007	Ceilândia		
2008–2009	ASSU		
2009	Alecrim		
2010	Ceilândia		

Managerial career
- 2016–2017: Baraúnas
- 2017: ASSU
- 2020: Potiguar de Mossoró
- 2022: ASSU
- * Club domestic league appearances and goals

João Maria Menezes Bezerra (born 5 June 1972), better known as Barata, is a Brazilian former professional footballer and manager who played as a forward.

== Career ==
Champion at ABC in his first years of career, Barata played for Itaperuna, Fluminense and in 1999, he was hired by Tenerife, a club for which he created identification and accumulated goals. He returned to Brazil in 2004 at Ponte Preta, and in football in Rio Grande do Norte he again accumulated achievements, being part of ASSU state title squad and conquering the promotion to Série C with Alecrim in 2009 Campeonato Brasileiro Série D.

== Managerial career ==
As a coach, Barata accumulated spells at Baraúnas, ASSU and Potiguar de Mossoró.

== Honours ==
ABC

- Campeonato Potiguar: 1994, 1995, 2005

ASSU

- Campeonato Potiguar: 2009
- Copa RN: 2009
