= Horácio de Faria =

Portuguese footballer

Personal information
- Full name: Horácio Delfim Dias de Faria
- Date of birth: 2 December 1947 (age 78)
- Place of birth: Matosinhos, Portugal
- Position: Forward

Senior career*
Years	Team	Apps	(Gls)
1966–1975	Leixões	211	(84)
1975–1981	Varzim	102	(36)
1981–1982	Salgueiros		
- * Club domestic league appearances and goals

Horácio Delfim Dias de Faria (born 2 December 1947), known as Horácio, is a Portuguese former footballer who played as a forward. He played 14 seasons and 313 games in the Primeira Liga for Leixões and Varzim.

== Career ==
De Faria made his Primeira Liga debut for Leixões on 18 September 1966 in a game against Sanjoanense.

On 14 December 1969, he scored five goals for Leixões against Boavista.
