= Tito (footballer, born 1946) =

Portuguese footballer

Personal information
- Full name: Tito José da Costa Santos
- Date of birth: 8 February 1946 (age 80)
- Place of birth: Lisbon, Portugal
- Position: Forward

Senior career*
Years	Team	Apps	(Gls)
1963–1969	Atlético CP		
1969–1971	União de Tomar		
1971–1978	Vitória de Guimarães	202	(86)
1978–1979	Famalicão	15	(0)
1979	Feirense		
1979	Toronto Blizzard	0	(0)
1979–1980	Toronto First Portuguese		
1980–1982	Coelima		
- * Club domestic league appearances and goals

Tito José da Costa Santos, known as Tito (born 8 February 1946) is a Portuguese former footballer who played as a forward.

He played 11 seasons and 292 games in the Primeira Liga for Vitória de Guimarães, Atlético CP, União de Tomar and Famalicão.

== Club career ==
Tito made his Primeira Liga debut for Atlético CP on 18 September 1966 in a game against Académica de Coimbra. In 1979, he signed with Toronto Blizzard in the North American Soccer League. He was released by Toronto in early 1979, and later played in the National Soccer League with Toronto First Portuguese. In his debut season with First Portuguese he contributed a goal in the finals match against Toronto Panhellenic which secured the NSL Cup. He returned to Portugal to play with Coelima.
