= Portugal national football team results (1940–1959) =

This page is a list of all the matches that Portugal national football team has played between 1940 and 1959.

== 1940s ==
28 January 1940 Friendly	France	3–2	Portugal	(France) Parc des Princes, Paris
14:15	Heisserer 17'; Koranyi 23', 75'	Report	83', 85' Peyroteo	Attendance: 18,083; Referee: (England) Bainbridge

12 January 1941 Friendly	Portugal	2–2	Spain	(Portugal) Estádio JM Soares, Lisbon
15:00	Carlos Pereira 59'; Peyroteo 80'	Report	9' Guillermo Campanal; 50' Escolà	Attendance: 25,000; Referee: (Italy) Peco Bauwens

16 March 1941 Friendly	Spain	5–1	Portugal	(Spain) San Mamés Stadium, Bilbao
15:30 (+1:00)	Herrerita 9'; Guillermo Campanal 23'; Campos 25'; Epi 75', 85'	Report	63' Pinga	Attendance: 25,000; Referee: (Germany) Peco Bauwens

1 January 1942 Friendly	Portugal	3–0	Switzerland	(Portugal) Estádio JM Soares, Lisbon
15:00	Alberto Gomes 26'; Mourão 43', 47'	Report		Attendance: 25,000; Referee: (Spain) Agustín Vilalta

11 March 1945 Friendly	Portugal	2–2	Spain	(Portugal) Estádio Nacional, Lisbon
16:00 (+1:00)	Peyroteo 10', 75'	Report	20' César; 58' Epi	Attendance: 60,000; Referee: (Switzerland) Eugenio Scherz

6 May 1945 Friendly	Spain	4–2	Portugal	(Spain) Estadio Riazor, A Coruña
17:00 (+2:00)	Zarra 38', 41'; Herrerita 70'; César 76' (pen.)	Report	10', 87' Peyroteo	Attendance: 40,000; Referee: (Switzerland) Eugenio Scherz

21 May 1945 Friendly	Switzerland	1–0	Portugal	(Switzerland) Sportplatz Rankhof, Basel
15:00 (+1:00)	Friedländer 51'	Report		Attendance: 20,000; Referee: (Spain) Pedro Escartín

14 April 1946 Friendly	Portugal	2–1	France	(Portugal) Estádio Nacional, Lisbon
16:00 (+1:00)	Araújo 39'; Peyroteo 72'	Report	68' Ernest Vaast	Attendance: 62,000; Referee: (England) George Reader

16 June 1946 Friendly	Portugal	3–1	Ireland	(Portugal) Estádio Nacional, Lisbon
17:00 (+1:00)	Araújo 7'; Pipi 15'; Peyroteo 24'	Report	53' O'Reilly	Attendance: 50,000; Referee: (Switzerland) Paul Von Wartburg

5 January 1947 Friendly	Portugal	2–2	Switzerland	(Portugal) Estádio Nacional, Lisbon
15:00	Pipi 17'; Moreira 50'	Report	7', 55' Fatton	Attendance: 25,000; Referee: (England) Cyrill Barrick

26 January 1947 Friendly	Portugal	4–1	Spain	(Portugal) Estádio Nacional, Lisbon
15:00	Araújo 15', 32'; Travaços 60', 88'	Report	1' Iriondo	Attendance: 68,000; Referee: (England) James Wiltshire

23 March 1947 Friendly	France	1–0	Portugal	(France) Stade Olympique Yves-du-Manoir, Colombes
15:00 (+1:00)	Bihel 41'	Report		Attendance: 57,791; Referee: (England) Cyrill Barrick

4 May 1947 Friendly	Ireland	0–2	Portugal	(Ireland) Dalymount Park, Dublin
15:30 (+1:00)		Report	13' Jesus Correia; 34' Araújo	Attendance: 31,618; Referee: (England) Henry Pearce

25 May 1947 Friendly	Portugal	0–10	England	(Portugal) Estádio Nacional, Lisbon
16:30 (+1:00)		Report	1', 59', 71', 77' Mortensen; 2', 11', 38', 61' Lawton; 21' Finney; 85' Matthews	Attendance: 65,000; Referee: (France) Charles Delasalle

23 November 1947 Friendly	Portugal	2–4	France	(Portugal) Estádio Nacional, Lisbon
15:00	Peyroteo 32'; Araújo 71'	Report	47', 51', 77' Vaast; 84' Benbarek	Attendance: 70,000; Referee: (Switzerland) Paul Von Wartburg

21 March 1948 Friendly	Spain	2–0	Portugal	(Spain) Estadio Chamartín, Madrid
17:00 (+1:00)	César 32'; Gaínza 48' (pen.)	Report		Attendance: 80,000; Referee: (England) William Evans

23 May 1948 Friendly	Portugal	2–0	Ireland	(Portugal) Estádio Nacional, Lisbon
16:00 (+1:00)	Peyroteo 22'; Albano 26'	Report		Attendance: 50,000; Referee: (Italy) Generoso Dattilo

27 February 1949 Friendly	Italy	4–1	Portugal	(Italy) Stadio Luigi Ferraris, Genoa
15:00 (+1:00)	Menti 57'; Carapellese 67'; Mazzola 75'; Maroso 81'	Report	21' Lourenço	Attendance: 60,000; Referee: (France) Victor Sdez

20 March 1949 Friendly	Portugal	1–1	Spain	(Portugal) Estádio Nacional, Lisbon
16:00	Peyroteo 57'	Report	47' Zarra	Attendance: 54,000; Referee: (France) Charles Delasalle

15 May 1949 Friendly	Portugal	3–2	Wales	(Portugal) Estádio Nacional, Lisbon
17:00 (+1:00)	Patalino 39'; José Mota 65'; Vasques 79'	Report	11', 40' Ford	Attendance: 51,000; Referee: (Italy) Generoso Dattilo

22 May 1949 Friendly	Ireland	1–0	Portugal	(Ireland) Dalymount Park, Dublin
15:30 (+1:00)	Coad 35' (pen.)	Report		Attendance: 28,108; Referee: (France) Marcel Le Foll

== 1950s ==
2 April 1950 (Brazil) 1950 World Cup Qualification	Spain	5–1	Portugal	(Spain) Estadio Chamartín, Madrid
17:00 (+1:00)	Zarra 18', 58'; Basora 19'; Panizo 20'; Molowny 65'	Report	38' Cabrita	Attendance: 80,000; Referee: (England) Reginald Leafe

9 April 1950 (Brazil) 1950 World Cup Qualification	Portugal	2–2	Spain	(Portugal) Estádio Nacional, Lisbon
16:30	Travaços 52'; Jesus Correia 54'	Report	25' Zarra; 82' Gaínza	Attendance: 30,000; Referee: (Scotland) Jack Mowat

14 May 1950 Friendly	Portugal	3–5	England	(Portugal) Estádio Nacional, Lisbon
17:00	Ben David 47', 59'; Vasques 70'	Report	4' (pen.), 28', 55', 72' (pen.) Finney; 15' Mortensen	Attendance: 65,000; Referee: (Italy) Giuseppe Carpani

21 May 1950 Friendly	Portugal	2–2	Scotland	(Portugal) Estádio Nacional, Lisbon
16:00	Travaços 9'; Albano 29'	Report	20' Bauld; 23' Brown	Attendance: 68,000; Referee: (Spain) Ramón Azón Roma

8 April 1951 Friendly	Portugal	1–4	Italy	(Portugal) Estádio Nacional, Lisbon
16:00 (+1:00)	Jesus Correia 85'	Report	7' Pandolfini; 14' Burini; 59' Amadei; 72' Cappello	Attendance: 50,000; Referee: (England) William Ling

12 May 1951 Friendly	Wales	2–1	Portugal	(Wales) Ninian Park, Cardiff
15:00 (+1:00)	Griffiths 36'; Ford 73'	Report	78' Ben David	Attendance: 60,000; Referee: (England) William Ling

19 May 1951 Friendly	England	5–2	Portugal	(England) Goodison Park, Liverpool
15:00 (+1:00)	Nicholson 1'; Milburn 9', 83'; Finney 75'; Hassall 87'	Report	2' Patalino; 48' Albano	Attendance: 52,686; Referee: (Belgium) Louis Baert

17 June 1951 Friendly	Portugal	1–1	Belgium	(Portugal) Estádio Nacional, Lisbon
18:00 (+1:00)	Ben David 2'	Report	64' Givard	Attendance: 50,000; Referee: (Italy) Generoso Dattilo

20 April 1952 Friendly	France	3–0	Portugal	(France) Stade Olympique Yves-du-Manoir, Colombes
15:00 (+1:00)	Alpsteg 15'; Strappe 68', 89'	Report		Attendance: 35,735; Referee: (England) Alfred Bond

23 November 1952 Friendly	Portugal	1–1	Austria	(Portugal) Estádio das Antas, Porto
15:00	Travaços 32'	Report	71' Halla	Attendance: 50,000; Referee: (Switzerland) Ernst Dörflinger

14 December 1952 Friendly	Portugal	1–3	Argentina	(Portugal) Estádio Nacional, Lisbon
15:00	Vasques 50'	Report	11' Loustau; 36', 38' Labruna	Attendance: 70,000; Referee: (England) William Ling

27 September 1953 (Switzerland) 1954 World Cup Qualification	Austria	9–1	Portugal	(Austria) Praterstadion, Vienna
16:00 (+1:00)	Ocwirk 13'; Probst 14', 19', 31', 59', 70'; Happel 68' (pen.); Wagner 83'; Dienst 87'	Report	Águas 60'	Attendance: 60,000; Referee: (Belgium) Henri Bauwens

22 November 1953 Friendly	Portugal	3–1	South Africa	(Portugal) Estádio Nacional, Lisbon
15:00	Hernâni 16'; Águas 23'; Matateu 73'	Report	75' Roos	Attendance: 30,000; Referee: (Spain) Manuel Asensi Martín

29 November 1953 (Switzerland) 1954 World Cup Qualification	Portugal	0–0	Austria	(Portugal) Estádio Nacional, Lisbon
14:30		Report		Attendance: 20,000; Referee: (France) Louis Fauquembergue

14 March 1954 Friendly	Belgium	0–0	Portugal	(Belgium) Stade du Heysel, Brussels
15:00 (+1:00)		Report		Attendance: 47,590; Referee: (France) Edouard Harzig

28 November 1954 Friendly	Portugal	1–3	Argentina	(Portugal) Estádio Nacional, Lisbon
15:00	Travaços 53'	Report	16' Micheli; 69' Grillo; 75' Cruz	Attendance: 50,000; Referee: (England) Archer Luty

19 December 1954 Friendly	Portugal	0–3	West Germany	(Portugal) Estádio Nacional, Lisbon
15:30		Report	7' Erhardt; 55' Pfaff; 74' Juskowiak	Attendance: 70,000; Referee: (Netherlands) Karel Van der Meer

4 May 1955 Friendly	Scotland	3–0	Portugal	(Scotland) Hampden Park, Glasgow
18:30 (+1:00)	Gemmell 7'; Liddell 36'; Reilly 89'	Report		Attendance: 20,858; Referee: (Spain) Juan Gardeazábal Garay

22 May 1955 Friendly	Portugal	3–1	England	(Portugal) Estádio das Antas, Porto
17:00 (+1:00)	Águas 24', 83'; Matateu 79'	Report	19' Bentley	Attendance: 51,000; Referee: (Italy) Giorgio Bernardi

20 November 1955 Friendly	Portugal	2–6	Sweden	(Portugal) Estádio Nacional, Lisbon
15:00	Águas 32', 79'	Report	11' Hamrin; 65' Nilsson; 70', 72' Löfgren; 82' Jonsson; 84' Sandell	Attendance: 50,000; Referee: (Italy) Cesare Jonni

18 December 1955 Friendly	Turkey	3–1	Portugal	(Turkey) Mithatpaşa Stadium, Istanbul
14:00 (+2:00)	Küçükandonyadis 51'; Oktay 57'; Bilge 73'	Report	38' Hernâni	Attendance: 22,313; Referee: (Socialist Federal Republic of Yugoslavia) Mirko Romčević

23 December 1955 Friendly	Egypt	0–4	Portugal	(Egypt) Prince Farouk Stadium, Cairo
		Report	33', 90' Águas; 36', 43' Matateu	Attendance: 15,000; Referee: (Italy) Ricardo Pieri

25 March 1956 Friendly	Portugal	3–1	Turkey	(Portugal) Estádio Nacional, Lisbon
15:30	Vasques 33'; Beratligil 47' (o.g.); Matateu 79'	Report	89' Açıksöz	Attendance: 50,000; Referee: (West Germany) Albert Dusch

8 April 1956 Friendly	Portugal	0–1	Brazil	(Portugal) Estádio Nacional, Lisbon
16:00 (+1:00)		Report	11' Orlando	Attendance: 55,000; Referee: (England) Reg Leafe

3 June 1956 Friendly	Portugal	3–1	Spain	(Portugal) Estádio Nacional, Lisbon
17:00 (+1:00)	Palmeiro 5', 26', 43'	Report	38' Peiró	Attendance: 75,000; Referee: (France) Jacques Devillers

9 June 1956 Friendly	Portugal	2–2	Hungary	(Portugal) Estádio Nacional, Lisbon
18:00 (+1:00)	Águas 45'; Vasques 65'	Report	51' Kocsis; 59' Lantos	Attendance: 70,000; Referee: (Italy) Vicenzo Orlandini

16 January 1957 (Sweden) 1958 World Cup Qualification	Portugal	1–1	Northern Ireland	(Portugal) Estádio José Alvalade (1956), Lisbon
22:00	Vasques 24'	Report	6' Bingham	Attendance: 30,000; Referee: (France) Marcel Lequesne

24 March 1957 Friendly	Portugal	0–1	France	(Portugal) Estádio José Alvalade (1956), Lisbon
15:00		Report	55' Piantoni	Attendance: 42,000; Referee: (Spain) Manuel Asensi Martín

1 May 1957 (Sweden) 1958 World Cup Qualification	Northern Ireland	3–0	Portugal	(Northern Ireland) Windsor Park, Belfast
19:30 (+1:00)	Casey 22'; Simpson 61'; McIlroy 67' (pen.)	Report		Attendance: 35,000; Referee: (Scotland) Hugh Phillips

26 May 1957 (Sweden) 1958 World Cup Qualification	Portugal	3–0	Italy	(Portugal) Estádio Nacional, Lisbon
16:30 (+1:00)	Vasques 41'; Teixeira 83'; Matateu 87'	Report		Attendance: 37,000; Referee: (West Germany) Werner Treichel

11 June 1957 Friendly	Brazil	2–1	Portugal	(Brazil) Maracaña, Rio de Janeiro
21:30 (-3:00)	Didi 14'; Tite 61'	Report	52' Matateu	Attendance: 180,000; Referee: (England) Bertley Cross

16 June 1957 Friendly	Brazil	3–0	Portugal	(Brazil) Estádio do Pacaembu, São Paulo
15:15 (-3:00)	Zito 16'; Altafini 78'; Del Vecchio 84'	Report		Attendance: 21,033; Referee: (England) Bertley Cross

22 December 1957 (Sweden) 1958 World Cup Qualification	Italy	3–0	Portugal	(Italy) San Siro, Milan
14:30 (+1:00)	Gratton 36', 72'; Pivatelli 84'	Report		Attendance: 50,000; Referee: (Socialist Federal Republic of Yugoslavia) Ezio Damiani

13 April 1958 Friendly	Spain	1–0	Portugal	(Spain) Santiago Bernabéu Stadium, Madrid
17:00 (+1:00)	Di Stéfano 85'	Report		Attendance: 80,000; Referee: (France) Marcel Lequesne

7 May 1958 Friendly	England	2–1	Portugal	(England) Wembley Stadium (1923), London
19:30 (+1:00)	Bobby Charlton 25', 62'	Report	51' Carlos Duarte	Attendance: 72,000; Referee: (Belgium) Albert Alsteen

16 May 1959 Friendly	Switzerland	4–3	Portugal	(Switzerland) Charmilles Stadium, Geneva
17:30 (+1:00)	Burger 31', 55'; Hamel 44'; Frey 69'	Report	9' Hernâni; 46' Cavém; 89' Matateu	Attendance: 13,000; Referee: (France) Joseph Barberan

21 May 1959 Friendly	Sweden	2–0	Portugal	(Sweden) Ullevi, Gothenburg
19:00 (+1:00)	Simonsson 45' (pen.); Olsson 52'	Report		Attendance: 44,082; Referee: (Netherlands) Leopold Horn

3 June 1959 Friendly	Portugal	1–0	Scotland	(Portugal) Estádio José Alvalade (1956), Lisbon
22:00 (+1:00)	Matateu 25'	Report		Attendance: 30,000; Referee: (Spain) Daniel Zariquiegui Izco

21 June 1959 (France) 1960 EURO First round	East Germany	0–2	Portugal	(East Germany) Walter-Ulbricht-Stadion, East-Berlin
		Report	12' Matateu; 67' Coluna	Attendance: 25,000; Referee: (Czechoslovakia) Alois Obtulovič

28 June 1959 (France) 1960 EURO First round	Portugal	3–2	East Germany	(Portugal) Estádio das Antas, Porto
16:00 (+1:00)	Coluna 45', 62'; Cavém 68'	Report	47' Vogt; 72' Kohle	Attendance: 19,124; Referee: (Spain) Juan Gardeazábal Garay

11 November 1959 Friendly	France	5–3	Portugal	(France) Stade Olympique Yves-du-Manoir, Colombes
17:30 (+1:00)	Just Fontaine 3', 54', 58'; Pierre Grillet 11'; Lucien Muller 22'	Report	36', 76' Matateu; 41' Domiciano Cavém	Attendance: 48,111; Referee: (England) Ken Aston
