= List of Sporting CP seasons =

Evolution of Sporting Clube de Portugal's league performances since 1938

Sporting Clube de Portugal, referred to colloquially as Sporting, Sporting CP or Sporting Lisbon, is a Portuguese sports club based in Lisbon. The club is particularly renowned for its football branch. With more than 100,000 registered club members, Sporting is one of the most successful and popular sports clubs in Portugal. Its teams, athletes and supporters are often nicknamed Os Leões (English: The Lions).

== Key ==
Table headers

- Pos – Final position in the league classification
- Pld – Number of league matches played
- W – Number of league matches won
- D – Number of league matches drawn
- L – Number of league matches lost
- GF – Number of goals scored in league matches
- GA – Number of goals conceded in league matches
- Pts – Number of points at the end of the league

Divisions

- Regional – Lisbon regional championship

Results and rounds

- 1st or W – Champion or Winner
- 2nd or RU – Runner-up
- SF – Semi-finals
- QF – Quarter-finals
- R16, R32, R64, R128 – Round of 16, 32, 64, 128
- R1, R2, R3, R4 – First, second, third, fourth round
- GS, GS2 – (First) Group stage, second group stage
- PO – Play-off round
- Q3 – Third qualifying round
- PR – Preliminary round

Top-scorers

- Players whose name is in italics were also the regional championship or Primeira Liga top-scorers.
- GS – Players who were also top-scorers in Europe (European Golden Shoe).

== Seasons ==
As of match played 25 May 2025

| Season | Division | Pos | Pld | W | D | L | GF | GA | Pts | Cup (Note: Before the official establishment of the Primeira Liga as the primary national championship, in the 1938–39 season, the Taça de Portugal was called Campeonato de Portugal (English: Championship of Portugal) and its winners were declared the national champions (although the winners of the Championship of Portugal no longer count as Portuguese football champions).) | League Cup | Competition | Result | Competition | Result | Player(s) | Goals |
| Season | League | | | | | | | | | Cup | League Cup | European competitions | | Other competitions | | Top scorer(s) (Note: Only goals scored in the regional championship or Primeira Liga are considered.) | |
|---|---|---|---|---|---|---|---|---|---|---|---|---|---|---|---|---|---|
| 1906–07 | — | — | — | — | — | — | — | — | — | — | — | — | — | — | — | — | — |
| 1907–08 | Regional | 2nd | 10 | 7 | 0 | 3 | 11 | 15 | 14 | — | — | — | — | — | — | — | — |
| 1908–09 | Regional | 4th | 10 | 4 | 0 | 6 | 14 | 8 | 8 | — | — | — | — | — | — | — | — |
| 1909–10 | Regional | 5th | 10 | 2 | 2 | 6 | 10 | 18 | 6 | — | — | — | — | — | — | — | — |
| 1910–11 | Regional | 3rd | 12 | 6 | 2 | 4 | 30 | 15 | 14 | — | — | — | — | — | — | — | — |
| 1911–12 | Regional | 3rd | 6 | 2 | 0 | 4 | 9 | 12 | 4 | — | — | — | — | — | — | — | — |
| 1912–13 | Regional | 2nd | 8 | 5 | 1 | 2 | 17 | 10 | 11 | — | — | — | — | — | — | — | — |
| 1913–14 | Regional | 3rd | 10 | 5 | 1 | 4 | 11 | 18 | 11 | — | — | — | — | — | — | — | — |
| 1914–15 | Regional | 1st | 10 | 9 | 0 | 1 | 37 | 8 | 18 | — | — | — | — | — | — | — | — |
| 1915–16 | Regional | 3rd | 8 | 3 | 1 | 4 | 19 | 1 | 7 | — | — | — | — | — | — | — | — |
| 1916–17 | Regional | 2nd | 8 | 6 | 1 | 1 | 21 | 4 | 13 | — | — | — | — | — | — | — | — |
| 1917–18 | Regional | 2nd | 4 | 2 | 1 | 1 | 9 | 3 | 5 | — | — | — | — | — | — | — | — |
| 1918–19 | Regional | 1st (Note: Sporting CP had to play a two-legged final against Benfica as both finished the Regional at the top two positions with the same number of points. Sporting CP won both legs, 1–0 away (Campo de Benfica) and 2–1 at home (Estádio do Campo Grande). Both final matches are included on the stats.) | 10 | 8 | 0 | 2 | 20 | 9 | 16 | — | — | — | — | — | — | — | — |
| 1919–20 | Regional | 3rd | 7 | 3 | 1 | 3 | 9 | 8 | 7 | — | — | — | — | — | — | — | — |
| 1920–21 | Regional | 2nd (Note: Sporting CP had to play a match after the end of the second stage at the Estádio do Campo Grande against Belenenses to determine the second finalist as both finished the second stage of the Regional at the middle two positions with the same number of points. Sporting CP won 1–0. This match is included on the stats.) | 12 | 6 | 4 | 2 | 25 | 16 | 16 | — | — | — | — | — | — | — | — |
| 1921–22 | Regional | 1st | 6 | 5 | 0 | 1 | 15 | 2 | 10 | RU | — | — | — | — | — | Jaime Gonçalves | 5 |
| 1922–23 | Regional | 1st | 8 | 6 | 2 | 0 | 20 | 6 | 14 | W | — | — | — | — | — | Jaime Gonçalves | 6 |
| 1923–24 | Regional | 2nd | 8 | 4 | 1 | 3 | 15 | 11 | 9 | — | — | — | — | — | — | João Francisco | 8 |
| 1924–25 | Regional | 1st | 8 | 5 | 2 | 1 | 19 | 11 | 12 | RU | — | — | — | — | — | Jaime Gonçalves | 8 |
| 1925–26 | Regional | 2nd | 14 | 7 | 4 | 3 | 26 | 29 | 18 | — | — | — | — | — | — | João Francisco J. Manuel Martins Emílio Ramos | 6 |
| 1926–27 | Regional | 4th | 14 | 6 | 4 | 4 | 26 | 29 | 16 | QF | — | — | — | — | — | J. Manuel Martins | 6 |
| 1927–28 | Regional | 1st (Note: Sporting CP had to play a final match at an unknown ground against Benfica as both finished the Regional at the top two positions with the same number of points. Sporting CP won 3–0. The final match is included on the stats.) | 15 | 12 | 1 | 2 | 36 | 12 | 25 | RU | — | — | — | — | — | J. Manuel Martins | 10 |
| 1928–29 | Regional (Note: Starting this season, Regional wins became worth 3 points, ties became worth 2 points and defeats became worth 1 point; instead of the traditional 2/1/0 points. If a team failed to show up at any given match, that team would not get any point.) | 5th | 14 | 5 | 4 | 5 | 26 | 22 | 28 | SF | — | — | — | — | — | A. Abrantes Mendes | 12 |
| 1929–30 | Regional | 3rd | 14 | 10 | 1 | 3 | 37 | 13 | 35 | R16 | — | — | — | — | — | Rogério de Sousa | 12 |
| 1930–31 | Regional | 1st | 14 | 12 | 1 | 1 | 40 | 8 | 39 | — | — | — | — | — | — | A. Abrantes Mendes Eduardo Mourinha Rogério de Sousa | 11 |
| 1931–32 | Regional | 2nd (Note: Sporting CP had to play a final match at an unknown ground against Belenenses as both finished the Regional at the top two positions with the same number of points. However, Sporting CP failed to show up for the final, getting 0 points as a consequence, and Belenenses won the Regional. The final match is included on the stats, as a third defeat.) | 14 | 9 | 2 | 3 | 43 | 15 | 33 | R16 | — | — | — | — | — | A. Abrantes Mendes | 12 |
| 1932–33 | Regional | 3rd | 18 | 11 | 3 | 4 | 44 | 24 | 43 | RU | — | — | — | — | — | Alfredo Valadas | 14 |
| 1933–34 | Regional | 1st | 9 | 7 | 1 | 1 | 25 | 6 | 24 | W | — | — | — | — | — | Adolfo Mourão | 6 |
| 1934–35 | Primeira Liga Regional | 2nd 1st (Note: Sporting CP had to play a final round-robin tournament against Benfica and Belenenses as all three finished the Regional at the top three positions with the same number of points. Sporting CP won both matches and got the first place. Both Sporting CP matches are included on the stats.) | 14 12 | 8 8 | 4 2 | 2 2 | 39 32 | 20 13 | 20 30 | RU | — | — | — | — | — | Manuel Soeiro Manuel Soeiro | 14 11 |
| 1935–36 | Primeira Liga Regional | 3rd 1st (Note: Sporting CP had to play a final match at the Campo das Salésias against Benfica as both finished the Regional at the top two positions with the same number of points. Sporting CP won 4–1. The final match is included on the stats.) | 14 11 | 8 9 | 2 0 | 4 2 | 41 40 | 31 12 | 18 29 | W | — | — | — | — | — | Francisco Lopes Pedro Pireza | 11 11 |
| 1936–37 | Primeira Liga Regional | 3rd 1st | 14 10 | 9 6 | 2 2 | 3 2 | 54 31 | 25 9 | 20 24 | RU | — | — | — | — | — | Manuel Soeiro Manuel Soeiro | 24 12 |
| 1937–38 | Primeira Liga Regional | 3rd 1st | 14 10 | 10 9 | 2 1 | 2 0 | 67 44 | 23 11 | 22 29 | W | — | — | — | — | — | Fernando Peyroteo Fernando Peyroteo | 34 13 |
| 1938–39 | Primeira Divisão (Note: After four experimental editions, the Primeira Liga was officially established as a national league competition with the purpose of determining the national champions, thus replacing the Campeonato de Portugal, which was converted into the Taça de Portugal, the top domestic cup competition.) Regional | 2nd 1st | 14 10 | 10 7 | 2 1 | 2 2 | 44 53 | 17 13 | 22 25 | SF | — | — | — | — | — | Fernando Peyroteo Fernando Peyroteo | 14 23 |
| 1939–40 | Primeira Divisão Regional | 2nd 2nd | 18 10 | 15 8 | 2 1 | 1 1 | 87 44 | 23 17 | 32 27 | QF | — | — | — | — | — | Fernando Peyroteo Fernando Peyroteo | 29 17 |
| 1940–41 | Primeira Divisão Regional | 1st 1st | 14 10 | 11 8 | 1 0 | 2 2 | 58 55 | 23 11 | 23 26 | W | — | — | — | — | — | Fernando Peyroteo Manuel Soeiro | 29 17 |
| 1941–42 | Primeira Divisão Regional | 2nd 1st | 22 10 | 17 9 | 0 0 | 5 1 | 93 47 | 31 10 | 34 28 | SF | — | — | — | — | — | Fernando Peyroteo Fernando Peyroteo | 28 18 |
| 1942–43 | Primeira Divisão Regional | 2nd 1st | 18 10 | 14 8 | 1 1 | 3 1 | 66 35 | 37 17 | 29 27 | SF | — | — | — | — | — | Fernando Peyroteo Fernando Peyroteo | 22 13 |
| 1943–44 | Primeira Divisão Regional | 1st 3rd | 18 10 | 14 5 | 3 2 | 1 3 | 61 28 | 22 24 | 31 22 | R16 | — | — | — | — | — | Fernando Peyroteo Fernando Peyroteo | 23 11 |
| 1944–45 | Primeira Divisão Regional | 3rd 1st | 18 10 | 13 7 | 1 2 | 4 1 | 57 27 | 37 18 | 27 26 | W | — | — | — | — | — | Fernando Peyroteo Fernando Peyroteo | 19 11 |
| 1945–46 | Primeira Divisão Regional | 3rd 2nd | 22 10 | 15 6 | 2 1 | 5 3 | 73 24 | 36 20 | 32 23 | W | — | — | — | — | — | Fernando Peyroteo Fernando Peyroteo | 39 11 |
| 1946–47 | Primeira Divisão Regional | 1st 1st | 26 10 | 23 7 | 1 2 | 2 1 | 123 37 | 40 19 | 47 26 | Not held (Note: The Cup was not organized in the 1946–47 season due to overscheduling caused by the major changes of the football league system.) | — | — | — | — | — | Fernando Peyroteo A. Jesus Correia | 43 13 |
| 1947–48 | Primeira Divisão | 1st | 26 | 20 | 1 | 5 | 92 | 40 | 41 | W | — | — | — | — | — | Manuel Vasques | 17 |
| 1948–49 | Primeira Divisão | 1st | 26 | 20 | 2 | 4 | 100 | 35 | 42 | R32 | — | — | — | Latin Cup | RU | Fernando Peyroteo | 39 |
| 1949–50 | Primeira Divisão | 2nd | 26 | 19 | 1 | 6 | 91 | 35 | 39 | Not held (Note: The Cup was not organized in the 1949–50 season because the Estádio Nacional was the host venue for the Latin Cup.) | — | — | — | — | — | Mário Wilson | 24 |
| 1950–51 | Primeira Divisão | 1st | 26 | 21 | 3 | 2 | 91 | 28 | 45 | R16 | — | — | — | Latin Cup | 4th | Manuel Vasques | 29 |
| 1951–52 | Primeira Divisão | 1st | 26 | 19 | 3 | 4 | 91 | 32 | 41 | W | — | — | — | Latin Cup | 4th | A. Jesus Correia | 22 |
| 1952–53 | Primeira Divisão | 1st | 26 | 19 | 5 | 2 | 77 | 22 | 43 | QF (Note: Sporting CP did not show up for the second leg of the quarter-final tie with Lusitano Évora after a 2–2 draw at home on the first leg, and forfeited the competition in order to focus on the Latin Cup participation days later. Lusitano Évora advanced automatically to the semi-finals.) | — | — | — | Latin Cup | 3rd | João Martins | 26 |
| 1953–54 | Primeira Divisão | 1st | 26 | 20 | 3 | 3 | 80 | 25 | 43 | W | — | — | — | — | — | João Martins | 31 |
| 1954–55 | Primeira Divisão | 3rd | 26 | 15 | 7 | 4 | 73 | 27 | 37 | RU | — | — | — | — | — | João Martins | 22 |
| 1955–56 | Primeira Divisão | 4th | 26 | 15 | 6 | 5 | 54 | 27 | 36 | R16 | — | European Cup | R1 | — | — | Manuel Vasques | 19 |
| 1956–57 | Primeira Divisão | 4th | 26 | 12 | 7 | 7 | 62 | 28 | 31 | QF | — | — | — | — | — | João Martins | 13 |
| 1957–58 | Primeira Divisão | 1st | 26 | 19 | 5 | 2 | 79 | 21 | 43 | QF | — | — | — | — | — | Manuel Vasques | 19 |
| 1958–59 | Primeira Divisão | 4th | 26 | 12 | 7 | 7 | 50 | 28 | 31 | SF | — | European Cup | R1 | — | — | Hugo Sarmento | 9 |
| 1959–60 | Primeira Divisão | 2nd | 26 | 19 | 5 | 2 | 82 | 20 | 43 | RU | — | — | — | — | — | Fernando Puglia | 23 |
| 1960–61 | Primeira Divisão | 2nd | 26 | 19 | 4 | 3 | 61 | 19 | 42 | SF | — | — | — | — | — | Fernando Puglia | 18 |
| 1961–62 | Primeira Divisão | 1st | 26 | 19 | 5 | 2 | 66 | 17 | 43 | QF | — | European Cup | PR | — | — | Diego Arizaga | 16 |
| 1962–63 | Primeira Divisão | 3rd | 26 | 18 | 2 | 6 | 71 | 31 | 38 | W | — | European Cup | R1 | — | — | João Morais | 18 |
| 1963–64 | Primeira Divisão | 3rd | 26 | 13 | 8 | 5 | 49 | 26 | 34 | R16 | — | Cup Winners' Cup | W | — | — | Ernesto Figueiredo | 17 |
| 1964–65 | Primeira Divisão | 5th | 26 | 12 | 8 | 6 | 39 | 35 | 32 | SF | — | Cup Winners' Cup | R2 | — | — | João Lourenço | 15 |
| 1965–66 | Primeira Divisão | 1st | 26 | 18 | 6 | 2 | 70 | 21 | 42 | SF | — | Inter-Cities Fairs Cup | R2 | — | — | Ernesto Figueiredo | 25 |
| 1966–67 | Primeira Divisão | 4th | 26 | 11 | 8 | 7 | 36 | 24 | 30 | R64 | — | European Cup | R1 | — | — | Manuel Duarte | 11 |
| 1967–68 | Primeira Divisão | 2nd | 26 | 17 | 3 | 6 | 48 | 24 | 37 | R32 | — | Inter-Cities Fairs Cup | R3 | — | — | João Lourenço | 17 |
| 1968–69 | Primeira Divisão | 5th | 26 | 11 | 8 | 7 | 35 | 20 | 30 | SF | — | Inter-Cities Fairs Cup | R2 | — | — | João Lourenço | 16 |
| 1969–70 | Primeira Divisão | 1st | 26 | 21 | 4 | 1 | 61 | 17 | 46 | RU | — | Inter-Cities Fairs Cup | R2 | — | — | Nélson | 17 |
| 1970–71 | Primeira Divisão | 2nd | 26 | 16 | 6 | 4 | 45 | 14 | 38 | W | — | European Cup | R2 | — | — | João Lourenço Nélson Fernando Peres | 7 |
| 1971–72 | Primeira Divisão | 3rd | 30 | 17 | 9 | 4 | 51 | 26 | 43 | RU | — | Cup Winners' Cup | R2 | — | — | Chico Faria Fernando Peres | 10 |
| 1972–73 | Primeira Divisão | 5th | 30 | 15 | 7 | 8 | 57 | 31 | 37 | W | — | Cup Winners' Cup | R1 | — | — | Héctor Yazalde | 19 |
| 1973–74 | Primeira Divisão | 1st | 30 | 23 | 3 | 4 | 96 | 21 | 49 | W | — | Cup Winners' Cup | SF | — | — | Héctor Yazalde | 46^{GS} |
| 1974–75 | Primeira Divisão | 3rd | 30 | 17 | 9 | 4 | 59 | 25 | 43 | SF | — | European Cup | R1 | — | — | Héctor Yazalde | 30 |
| 1975–76 | Primeira Divisão | 5th | 30 | 16 | 6 | 8 | 54 | 31 | 38 | SF | — | UEFA Cup | R2 | — | — | Manuel Fernandes | 26 |
| 1976–77 | Primeira Divisão | 2nd | 30 | 17 | 8 | 5 | 59 | 26 | 42 | QF | — | — | — | — | — | Manuel Fernandes | 21 |
| 1977–78 | Primeira Divisão | 3rd | 30 | 19 | 4 | 7 | 63 | 30 | 42 | W | — | UEFA Cup | R1 | — | — | Rui Jordão | 15 |
| 1978–79 | Primeira Divisão | 3rd | 30 | 17 | 8 | 5 | 46 | 22 | 42 | RU | — | Cup Winners' Cup | R1 | — | — | Manuel Fernandes Salif Keïta | 10 |
| 1979–80 | Primeira Divisão | 1st | 30 | 24 | 4 | 2 | 67 | 17 | 52 | R16 | — | UEFA Cup | R2 | — | — | Rui Jordão | 31 |
| 1980–81 | Primeira Divisão | 3rd | 30 | 14 | 9 | 7 | 48 | 28 | 37 | R128 | — | European Cup | R1 | Supertaça | RU | Rui Jordão | 14 |
| 1981–82 | Primeira Divisão | 1st | 30 | 19 | 8 | 3 | 66 | 26 | 46 | W | — | UEFA Cup | R3 | — | — | Rui Jordão | 26 |
| 1982–83 | Primeira Divisão | 3rd | 30 | 18 | 6 | 6 | 48 | 25 | 42 | QF | — | European Cup | QF | Supertaça | W | Rui Jordão | 18 |
| 1983–84 | Primeira Divisão | 3rd | 30 | 19 | 4 | 7 | 58 | 24 | 42 | SF | — | UEFA Cup | R2 | — | — | Manuel Fernandes | 17 |
| 1984–85 | Primeira Divisão | 2nd | 30 | 19 | 9 | 2 | 78 | 26 | 47 | R16 | — | UEFA Cup | R2 | — | — | Manuel Fernandes | 16 |
| 1985–86 | Primeira Divisão | 3rd | 30 | 20 | 6 | 4 | 64 | 20 | 46 | QF | — | UEFA Cup | QF | — | — | Manuel Fernandes | 30 |
| 1986–87 | Primeira Divisão | 4th | 30 | 15 | 8 | 7 | 52 | 28 | 38 | RU | — | UEFA Cup | R2 | — | — | Manuel Fernandes | 17 |
| 1987–88 | Primeira Divisão | 4th | 38 | 17 | 13 | 8 | 62 | 41 | 47 | R128 | — | Cup Winners' Cup | QF | Supertaça | W | Paulinho Cascavel | 23 |
| 1988–89 | Primeira Divisão | 4th | 38 | 18 | 9 | 11 | 50 | 33 | 45 | SF | — | UEFA Cup | R2 | — | — | Paulinho Cascavel | 11 |
| 1989–90 | Primeira Divisão | 3rd | 34 | 17 | 12 | 5 | 42 | 24 | 46 | R64 | — | UEFA Cup | R1 | — | — | Fernando Gomes | 9 |
| 1990–91 | Primeira Divisão | 3rd | 38 | 24 | 8 | 6 | 58 | 23 | 56 | R16 | — | UEFA Cup | SF | — | — | Fernando Gomes | 22 |
| 1991–92 | Primeira Divisão | 4th | 34 | 18 | 8 | 8 | 56 | 26 | 44 | R16 | — | UEFA Cup | R1 | — | — | Jorge Cadete | 25 |
| 1992–93 | Primeira Divisão | 3rd | 34 | 17 | 11 | 6 | 59 | 30 | 45 | SF | — | UEFA Cup | R1 | — | — | Jorge Cadete | 18 |
| 1993–94 | Primeira Divisão | 3rd | 34 | 23 | 5 | 6 | 71 | 29 | 51 | RU | — | UEFA Cup | R3 | — | — | Krasimir Balakov | 15 |
| 1994–95 | Primeira Divisão | 2nd | 34 | 23 | 9 | 2 | 59 | 21 | 55 | W | — | UEFA Cup | R1 | — | — | Andrzej Juskowiak | 10 |
| 1995–96 | Primeira Divisão (Note: Starting this season, league wins became worth 3 points, instead of the traditional 2 points.) | 3rd | 34 | 19 | 10 | 5 | 69 | 27 | 67 | RU | — | Cup Winners' Cup | R2 | Supertaça | W | Paulo Alves | 10 |
| 1996–97 | Primeira Divisão | 2nd | 34 | 22 | 6 | 6 | 55 | 19 | 72 | SF | — | UEFA Cup | R2 | — | — | Paulo Alves Oceano Ricardo Sá Pinto Ivaylo Yordanov | 6 |
| 1997–98 | Primeira Divisão | 4th | 34 | 15 | 11 | 8 | 45 | 33 | 56 | QF | — | Champions League | GS | — | — | Leandro | 10 |
| 1998–99 | Primeira Divisão | 4th | 34 | 17 | 12 | 5 | 64 | 32 | 63 | R64 | — | UEFA Cup | R1 | — | — | Ivaylo Yordanov | 13 |
| 1999–2000 | Primeira Liga | 1st | 34 | 23 | 8 | 3 | 57 | 22 | 77 | RU | — | UEFA Cup | R1 | — | — | Alberto Acosta | 22 |
| 2000–01 | Primeira Liga | 3rd | 34 | 19 | 5 | 10 | 56 | 37 | 62 | SF | — | Champions League | GS | Supertaça | W | Alberto Acosta | 14 |
| 2001–02 | Primeira Liga | 1st | 34 | 22 | 9 | 3 | 74 | 25 | 75 | W | — | UEFA Cup | R3 | — | — | Mário Jardel | 42^{GS} |
| 2002–03 | Primeira Liga | 3rd | 34 | 17 | 8 | 9 | 52 | 38 | 59 | QF | — | Champions League UEFA Cup | Q3 R1 | Supertaça | W | Mário Jardel | 11 |
| 2003–04 | Primeira Liga | 3rd | 34 | 23 | 4 | 7 | 60 | 33 | 73 | R32 | — | UEFA Cup | R2 | — | — | Liédson | 15 |
| 2004–05 | Primeira Liga | 3rd | 34 | 18 | 7 | 9 | 66 | 36 | 61 | R16 | — | UEFA Cup | RU | — | — | Liédson | 25 |
| 2005–06 | Primeira Liga | 2nd | 34 | 22 | 6 | 6 | 50 | 24 | 72 | SF | — | Champions League UEFA Cup | Q3 R1 | — | — | Liédson | 15 |
| 2006–07 | Primeira Liga | 2nd | 30 | 20 | 8 | 2 | 54 | 15 | 68 | W | — | Champions League | GS | — | — | Liédson | 15 |
| 2007–08 | Primeira Liga | 2nd | 30 | 16 | 7 | 7 | 46 | 28 | 55 | W | RU | Champions League UEFA Cup | GS QF | Supertaça | W | Liédson | 11 |
| 2008–09 | Primeira Liga | 2nd | 30 | 20 | 6 | 4 | 45 | 20 | 66 | R32 | RU | Champions League | R16 | Supertaça | W | Liédson | 17 |
| 2009–10 | Primeira Liga | 4th | 30 | 13 | 9 | 8 | 42 | 26 | 48 | QF | SF | Champions League Europa League | PO R16 | — | — | Liédson | 13 |
| 2010–11 | Primeira Liga | 3rd | 30 | 13 | 9 | 8 | 41 | 31 | 48 | R16 | SF | Europa League | R32 | — | — | Yannick Djaló Hélder Postiga | 6 |
| 2011–12 | Primeira Liga | 4th | 30 | 18 | 5 | 7 | 47 | 26 | 59 | RU | R3 (GS2) | Europa League | SF | — | — | R. van Wolfswinkel | 14 |
| 2012–13 | Primeira Liga | 7th | 30 | 11 | 9 | 10 | 36 | 36 | 42 | R64 | R3 (GS2) | Europa League | GS | — | — | R. van Wolfswinkel | 14 |
| 2013–14 | Primeira Liga | 2nd | 30 | 20 | 7 | 3 | 54 | 20 | 67 | R32 | R3 (GS2) | — | — | — | — | Fredy Montero | 13 |
| 2014–15 | Primeira Liga | 3rd | 34 | 22 | 10 | 2 | 67 | 29 | 76 | W | R3 (GS2) | Champions League Europa League | GS R32 | — | — | Islam Slimani | 12 |
| 2015–16 | Primeira Liga | 2nd | 34 | 27 | 5 | 2 | 79 | 21 | 86 | R16 | R3 (GS) | Champions League Europa League | PO R32 | Supertaça | W | Islam Slimani | 27 |
| 2016–17 | Primeira Liga | 3rd | 34 | 21 | 7 | 6 | 68 | 36 | 70 | QF | R3 (GS) | Champions League | GS | — | — | Bas Dost | 34 |
| 2017–18 | Primeira Liga | 3rd | 34 | 24 | 6 | 4 | 63 | 24 | 78 | RU | W | Champions League Europa League | GS QF | — | — | Bas Dost | 27 |
| 2018–19 | Primeira Liga | 3rd | 34 | 23 | 5 | 6 | 72 | 33 | 74 | W | W | Europa League | R32 | — | — | Bruno Fernandes | 20 |
| 2019–20 | Primeira Liga | 4th | 34 | 18 | 6 | 10 | 49 | 34 | 60 | R64 | SF | Europa League | R32 | Supertaça | RU | Bruno Fernandes | 8 |
| 2020–21 | Primeira Liga | 1st | 34 | 26 | 7 | 1 | 65 | 20 | 85 | R16 | W | Europa League | PO | — | — | Pedro Gonçalves | 23 |
| 2021–22 | Primeira Liga | 2nd | 34 | 27 | 4 | 3 | 73 | 23 | 85 | SF | W | Champions League | R16 | Supertaça | W | Pablo Sarabia | 15 |
| 2022–23 | Primeira Liga | 4th | 34 | 23 | 5 | 6 | 71 | 32 | 74 | R64 | RU | Champions League Europa League | GS QF | — | — | Pedro Gonçalves | 15 |
| 2023–24 | Primeira Liga | 1st | 34 | 29 | 3 | 2 | 96 | 29 | 90 | RU | SF | Europa League | R16 | — | — | Viktor Gyökeres | 29 |
| 2024–25 | Primeira Liga | 1st | 34 | 25 | 7 | 2 | 88 | 27 | 82 | W | RU | Champions League | KPO | Supertaça | RU | Viktor Gyökeres | 39 |
| 2025–26 | Primeira Liga | 2nd | 34 | 25 | 7 | 2 | 89 | 24 | 82 | RU | SF | Champions League | QF | Supertaça | RU | Luis Suárez | 28 |
