= Troféu Cinco Violinos =

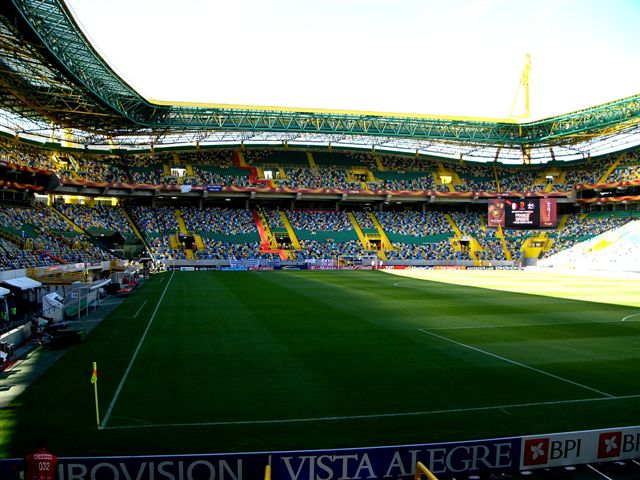
- Founded: 2012
- Teams: 2
- Current champions: Sporting CP (10th title)

The Troféu Cinco Violinos is an annual football tournament held at the Estádio José Alvalade in Lisbon, Portugal. Sporting CP hosts the tournament match in late July or early-mid August, one or two weeks before the competitive season kicks off. It is named after the "five violins" (cinco violinos): Jesus Correia, Manuel Vasques, Albano, Fernando Peyroteo and José Travassos.

== 2012 ==
12 August 2012
20:00 GMT

Sporting CP (Portugal)	1–0	(Greece) Olympiacos
Elias 53'	Report

Estádio José Alvalade, Lisbon
Referee: Duarte Gomes (Portugal)

Sporting CP	Olympiacos

== 2013 ==
11 August 2013
20:00 GMT

Sporting CP (Portugal)	3–0	(Italy) Fiorentina
Montero 5'; Carrillo 72'; Semedo 77'

Estádio José Alvalade, Lisbon
Referee: Pedro Proença (Portugal)

Sporting CP	Fiorentina

== 2014 ==
1 August 2014
20:00 GMT

Sporting CP (Portugal)	2–2	(Italy) Lazio
André Martins 5'; Adrien 52'		Mauri 45'; Tounkara 90+2'
Penalties
	4–2

Estádio José Alvalade, Lisbon
Referee: Duarte Gomes (Portugal)

Sporting CP	Lazio

== 2015 ==
1 August 2015
19:45 GMT

Sporting CP (Portugal)	2–0	(Italy) Roma
Slimani 63'; Mané 69'

Estádio José Alvalade, Lisbon

Sporting CP	Roma

== 2016 ==
30 July 2016
20:00 WEST

Sporting CP (Portugal)	2–1	(Germany) VfL Wolfsburg
Slimani 26'; Adrien 34' (pen.)		Vicente 78'

Estádio José Alvalade, Lisbon
Referee: Rui Rodrigues (Portugal)

Sporting CP	VfL Wolfsburg

== 2017 ==
29 July 2017
19:00 WEST

Sporting CP (Portugal)	1–0	(Italy) Fiorentina
Dost 29'

Estádio José Alvalade, Lisbon

Sporting CP	Fiorentina

== 2018 ==
5 August 2018
19:00 WEST

Sporting CP (Portugal)	1–1	(Italy) Empoli
Mišić 51'	Report	La Gumina 69'
Penalties
	4–5

Estádio José Alvalade, Lisbon

Sporting CP	Empoli

== 2019 ==
28 July 2019
19:00 WEST

Sporting CP (Portugal)	1–2	(Spain) Valencia
Dost 5'		Kondogbia 9'; Gameiro 66'

Estádio José Alvalade, Lisbon
Referee: João Pinheiro (Portugal)

Sporting CP	Valencia

== 2020 ==
The 2020 match was called off after several Sporting CP players tested positive for COVID-19.

13 September 2020
19:30 WEST

Sporting CP (Portugal)	Cancelled	(Italy) Napoli

Estádio José Alvalade, Lisbon

== 2021 ==
25 July 2021
19:00 WEST

Sporting CP (Portugal)	3–2	(France) Lyon
Paulinho 31', 49'; Gonçalves 35'		Aouar 8'; Slimani 90+4'

Estádio José Alvalade, Lisbon
Referee: Hugo Miguel (Portugal)

Sporting CP	Lyon

== 2022 ==
24 July 2022
19:45 WEST

Sporting CP (Portugal)	1–1	(Spain) Sevilla
Paulinho 82'	Report	Corona 15'
Penalties
Porro (penalty scored); Gonçalves (penalty scored); Rochinha (penalty scored); Tabata (penalty scored); Edwards (penalty scored); Issahaku (penalty missed)	5–6	(penalty scored) Gudelj; (penalty scored) Ocampos; (penalty scored) Gómez; (penalty scored) Jordán; (penalty scored) Suso; (penalty scored) Montiel

Estádio José Alvalade, Lisbon
Referee: António Nobre (Portugal)

Sporting CP	Sevilla

== 2023 ==
30 July 2023
20:00 WEST

Sporting CP (Portugal)	3–0	(Spain) Villarreal
Edwards 44'; Gonçalves 71'; Paulinho 75'	Report

Estádio José Alvalade, Lisbon
Referee: Halim Aqa Shirzad (Afghanistan)

Sporting CP	Villarreal

== 2024 ==
27 July 2024
19:30 WEST

Sporting CP (Portugal)	3–0	(Spain) Athletic Bilbao
Gonçalves 10'; Edwards 80'; Trincão 83'	Report

Estádio José Alvalade, Lisbon
Referee: Tiago Martins (Portugal)

Sporting CP	Athletic Bilbao

== Performance by team ==
Team	Winners	Runners-up
(Portugal) Sporting CP	10	3
(Spain) Valencia	1	0
(Italy) Empoli	1	0
(Spain) Sevilla	1	0
(Italy) Fiorentina	0	2
(Greece) Olympiacos	0	1
(Italy) Lazio	0	1
(Italy) Roma	0	1
(Germany) VfL Wolfsburg	0	1
(France) Lyon	0	1
(Spain) Villarreal	0	2
(Spain) Athletic Bilbao	0	1
