= José Mota (footballer, born 1919) =

Portuguese footballer

Personal information
- Full name: José Mota
- Date of birth: 7 September 1919
- Place of birth: Santa Maria Maior, Portugal
- Position: Forward

Senior career*
Years	Team	Apps	(Gls)
1946–1950	Estoril	78	(83)
1950–1952	Vitória Guimarães	20	(5)
1952–1953	Estoril	8	(0)
Total		106	(88)

International career
1949	Portugal	2	(1)
- * Club domestic league appearances and goals

José Mota (born 7 September 1919) was a Portuguese footballer who played as a forward.

== Club career ==
Born in Santa Maria Maior (Funchal), Madeira, Mota played in the Primeira Liga with G.D. Estoril Praia (two spells) and Vitória de Guimarães. He scored 88 goals in the competition over seven seasons, helping the former club to top-five finishes in 1946–47, 1947–48 and 1948–49.

On 1 December 1946, Mota scored a hat-trick in a 6–3 home win against S.L. Benfica.

== International career ==
Mota earned two caps for Portugal, scoring on his debut in a 3–2 victory over Wales on 15 May 1949. His fellow debutant Patalino also found the net in that match; they held the distinction until 11 November 2020, when Pedro Neto and Paulinho achieved that feat against Andorra.
