= Patalino =

Portuguese footballer (1922–1989)

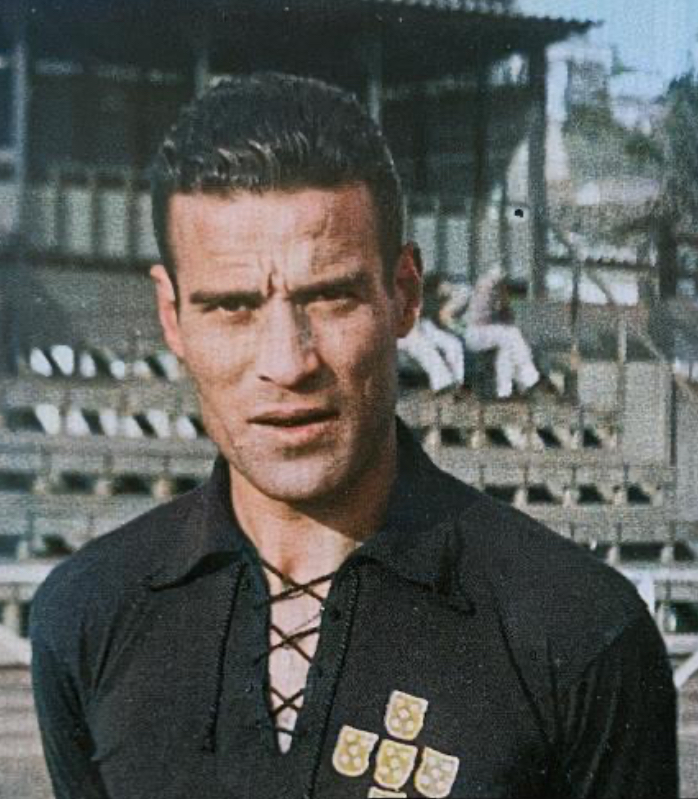

Personal information
- Full name: Domingos Carrilho Demétrio
- Date of birth: 29 June 1922
- Place of birth: Elvas, Portugal
- Date of death: 28 July 1989 (aged 67)
- Place of death: Portugal
- Height: 1.83 m (6 ft 0 in)
- Position: Forward

Senior career*
Years	Team	Apps	(Gls)
1940–1941	Elvenses		
1941–1943	SL Elvas		
1943–1944	Lanifícios		
1944–1947	SL Elvas	39	(39)
1947–1952	O Elvas	71	(54)
1952–1956	Lusitano Évora	78	(28)
1956–1960	Serpa		
1960–1961	Luso FC		
1961–1963	Arrentela		

International career
1949–1951	Portugal	3	(2)
- * Club domestic league appearances and goals

Domingos Carrilho Demétrio (29 June 1922 – 28 July 1989), commonly known as Patalino, was a Portuguese footballer who played as a forward.

== Club career ==
Patalino was born in Elvas, Portalegre District. He spent nine seasons of his 23-year senior career in the Primeira Liga, representing Sport Lisboa e Elvas, O Elvas C.A.D. (created following a merger between SL Elvas and another club in the region, Sporting Clube Elvense, farm teams of S.L. Benfica and Sporting CP respectively) and Lusitano G.C. and amassing totals of 188 matches and 121 goals.

In the 1947–48 Primeira Divisão, Patalino scored 24 times for O Elvas who finished eighth. Highlights included four goals in a 12–1 win against already-relegated Académica de Coimbra, and a brace in the 2–1 away victory over Benfica.

== International career ==
Patalino earned three caps for the Portugal national team in two years, scoring on his debut in a 3–2 win over Wales on 15 May 1949; his fellow debutant José Mota also found the net in that match. All of his appearances were in friendlies.
