= Fernando Peyroteo =

Portuguese footballer (1918–1978)

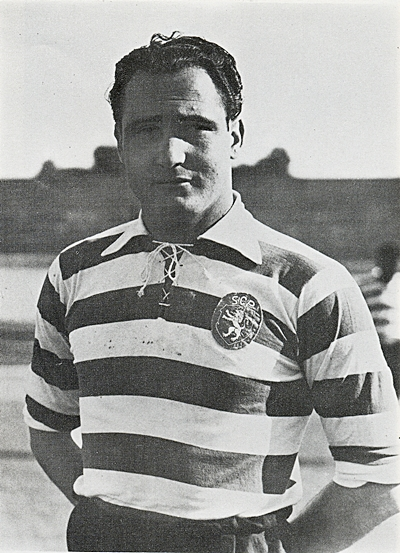

Personal information
- Full name: Fernando Baptista de Seixas Peyroteo de Vasconcelos
- Date of birth: 10 March 1918
- Place of birth: Humpata, Angola
- Date of death: 28 November 1978 (aged 60)
- Place of death: Lisbon, Portugal
- Position: Striker

Youth career
- 1932–1934: Moçâmedes
- 1934–1936: Académico Sá da Bandeira
- 1936–1937: Sporting Luanda

Senior career*
Years	Team	Apps	(Gls)
1937–1949	Sporting CP	197	(332)
Total		197	(332)

International career
1938–1949	Portugal	20	(14)

Managerial career
- 1961: Portugal
- * Club domestic league appearances and goals

Fernando Baptista de Seixas Peyroteo de Vasconcelos (10 March 1918 – 28 November 1978) was a Portuguese professional footballer who played as a striker.

He spent his entire professional career with Sporting CP, scoring 544 goals in all competitions, winning 11 major titles and being crowned his country's top-division scorer on six occasions.

Peyroteo earned caps for Portugal in the 1930s and 40s.

== Club career ==
Born in Humpata, Huíla Province, Portuguese Angola, Peyroteo arrived at Sporting CP on 26 June 1937 after being introduced to the club by family friend Aníbal Paciência, and he quickly impressed new manager József Szabó by scoring a hat-trick in a practice match. His competitive debut came on 12 September, and he netted a brace against rivals Benfica. He went on to be part of the club's attacking line that included Albano, Jesus Correia, José Travassos and Manuel Vasques and was dubbed the Cinco Violinos (Five Violins), scoring 57 goals in only 30 games in his first year to win both the Lisbon Championship and the Taça de Portugal, then named Portuguese Championship.

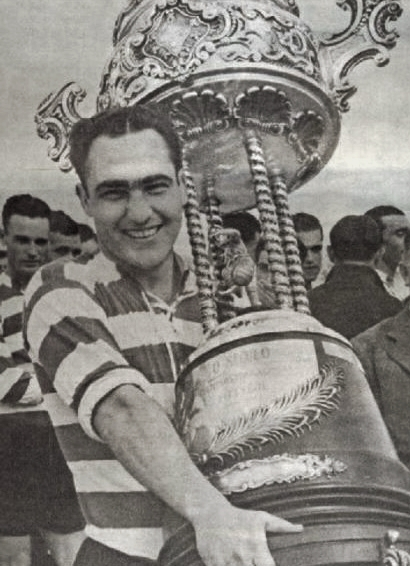
Peyroteo holding the 1949 Taça do Século

During his spell with the Lisbon side, Peyroteo won five Primeira Liga trophies, five domestic cups and the first edition of the Supertaça Cândido de Oliveira at the new Estádio Nacional, scoring twice in the latter tournament for an eventual 3–2 extra time win over Benfica. He managed nine in a single game against Leça and eight against Boavista, and his goals-per-game ratio was the best in Portuguese football, at 1.68 per game.

I have been a soldier in the ranks of national sport, and a soldier does not escape from his duty, no matter what the circumstances. But today I recognise that I am an old soldier. I can no longer meet the demands faced by a football player who wants to stay in shape and be useful to his club and to the sport. When I enter the field I am filled with enthusiasm, but after half a dozen kicks on the ball, an inexplicable tiredness falls on me.

— Peyroteo's farewell speech following his final game against Atlético, explaining why he retired

Peyroteo contributed 40 goals in the 1948–49 campaign as the Lions conquered their third league in a row. He retired shortly after at the age of 31, with the revenue from the testimonial match against Atlético Clube de Portugal being used to pay debts he had collected with a sportswear shop he had opened.

Peyroteo subsequently moved back to Angola, but returned eventually to Portugal to coach the national team: after his second game, a 4–2 loss at minnows Luxembourg for the 1962 FIFA World Cup qualifiers which brought a young Eusébio his first cap, he was relieved of his duties, and quit football altogether. After a veterans match in Barcelona, he was forced to undergo surgery that brought complications later, leading to the amputation of one leg; he died in the Portuguese capital, at the age of 60.

== International career ==
Peyroteo played 20 times for Portugal over 11 years, scoring 14 goals. He made his debut on 24 April 1938, in a friendly against Germany in Frankfurt.

== Personal life ==
José Couceiro, a football player and later a manager, was Peyroteo's grandnephew. António César de Vasconcelos Correia, 1st Viscount and 1st Count of Torres Novas and the 93rd Governor of Portuguese India, was his great-uncle; Augusto de Vasconcelos was his second cousin once removed.

Peyroteo's paternal grandfather was Spanish.

== Career statistics ==
=== Club ===
Appearances and goals by club, season and competition
Club	Season	Primeira Liga (Note: Both as Primeira Liga and Primeira Divisão)		Taça de Portugal (Note: Both as Campeonato de Portugal and Taça de Portugal)		Lisbon Championship (Note: Both as Campeonato de Lisboa and Taça de Honra)		Other (Note: Includes Taça do Império and Latin Cup)		Total	
Club	Season	Apps	Goals	Apps	Goals	Apps	Goals	Apps	Goals	Apps	Goals
Sporting CP	1937–38	14	34	6	11	10	12	—		30	57
Sporting CP	1938–39	10	14	6	8	10	23	—		26	45
Sporting CP	1939–40	17	29	4	8	10	17	—		31	54
Sporting CP	1940–41	14	29	4	6	2	2	—		20	37
Sporting CP	1941–42	12	28	3	5	10	19	—		25	52
Sporting CP	1942–43	18	21	3	4	10	13	—		31	38
Sporting CP	1943–44	17	24	2	1	9	11	1 (Note: Appearance in Taça do Império)	2	29	38
Sporting CP	1944–45	15	19	6	10	10	11	—		31	40
Sporting CP	1945–46	21	37	4	8	10	11	—		35	56
Sporting CP	1946–47	19	43	—		4	4	—		23	47
Sporting CP	1947–48	17	14	5	13	6	10	—		28	37
Sporting CP	1948–49	23	40	0	0	—		2 (Note: All appearances in Latin Cup)	3	25	43
Career total		197	332	43	74	91	133	3	5	334	544

=== International ===
Appearances and goals by national team and year
National team	Year	Apps	Goals
Portugal	1938	3	1
Portugal	1939	0	0
Portugal	1940	1	2
Portugal	1941	1	1
Portugal	1942	1	0
Portugal	1943	0	0
Portugal	1944	0	0
Portugal	1945	3	4
Portugal	1946	2	3
Portugal	1947	6	1
Portugal	1948	1	1
Portugal	1949	2	1
Total		20	14

Scores and results list Portugal's goal tally first, score column indicates score after each Peyroteo goal.

List of international goals scored by Fernando Peyroteo
No.	Date	Venue	Opponent	Score	Result	Competition
1	1 May 1938	Arena Civica, Milan, Italy	Switzerland	1–2	1–2	1938 FIFA World Cup qualification
2	28 January 1940	Parc des Princes, Paris, France	France	1–3	2–3	Friendly
3	28 January 1940	Parc des Princes, Paris, France	France	2–3	2–3	Friendly
4	12 January 1941	Campo das Salésias, Lisbon, Portugal	Spain	2–2	2–2	Friendly
5	11 March 1945	Estádio Nacional, Lisbon, Portugal	Spain	1–0	2–2	Friendly
6	11 March 1945	Estádio Nacional, Lisbon, Portugal	Spain	2–2	2–2	Friendly
7	6 May 1945	Estadio Riazor, A Coruña, Spain	Spain	1–0	2–4	Friendly
8	6 May 1945	Estadio Riazor, A Coruña, Spain	Spain	2–4	2–4	Friendly
9	14 April 1946	Estádio Nacional, Lisbon, Portugal	France	2–1	2–1	Friendly
10	16 June 1946	Estádio Nacional, Lisbon, Portugal	Ireland	1–0	3–1	Friendly
11	16 June 1946	Estádio Nacional, Lisbon, Portugal	Ireland	3–0	3–1	Friendly
12	23 November 1947	Estádio Nacional, Lisbon, Portugal	France	1–0	2–4	Friendly
13	23 May 1948	Estádio Nacional, Lisbon, Portugal	Ireland	1–0	2–0	Friendly
14	20 March 1949	Estádio Nacional, Lisbon, Portugal	Spain	1–1	1–1	Friendly

== Honours ==
Sporting CP

- Primeira Liga: 1940–41, 1943–44, 1946–47, 1947–48, 1948–49
- Taça de Portugal: 1937–38, 1940–41, 1944–45, 1945–46, 1947–48
- Supertaça Cândido de Oliveira: 1944

Individual

- Bola de Prata: 1937–38, 1939–40, 1940–41, 1945–46, 1946–47, 1948–49

== See also ==
- List of men's footballers with 500 or more goals
- List of one-club men
