= 1958 FIFA World Cup qualification – UEFA Group 8 =

Football tournament

The three teams in this group played against each other on a home-and-away basis. The group winner Northern Ireland qualified for the sixth FIFA World Cup held in Sweden.

The 15 January 1958 fixture of Italy at Northern Ireland was originally scheduled for 4 December 1957 but heavy fog in London prevented the referee (Istvan Zsolt, manager of the Budapest Opera House) from arriving for the match in time. The fixture was postponed but the match continued as a friendly, and ended in a 2-2 draw and a riot as the crowd (infuriated by the postponement and quite rough play from some Italian players) invaded the pitch. The 'friendly' match was dubbed the 'Battle of Belfast'. Danny Blanchflower, Northern Ireland captain at the time, helped save the situation by ordering his players to escort their Italian counterparts off the field while the police dealt with the crowd.

== Table ==
Pos	Team	Pld	W	D	L	GF	GA	GR	Pts	Qualification	Northern Ireland national football team	Italy national football team	Portugal national football team
1	Northern Ireland	4	2	1	1	6	3	2.000	5	Qualification to 1958 FIFA World Cup	—	2–1	3–0
2	Italy	4	2	0	2	5	5	1.000	4		1–0	—	3–0
3	Portugal	4	1	1	2	4	7	0.571	3		1–1	3–0	—

Source: FIFA

== Matches ==
16 January 1957

Portugal	1 – 1	Northern Ireland
Vasques 24'	Report	Bingham 6'

Attendance: 33,000
Referee: Lequesne (France)

25 April 1957

Italy	1 – 0	Northern Ireland
Cervato 3'	Report

Attendance: 70,000
Referee: Guigue (France)

1 May 1957

Northern Ireland	3 – 0	Portugal
Casey 22'; Simpson 60'; McIlroy 70' (pen.)	Report

Attendance: 35,000
Referee: Phillips (Scotland)

26 May 1957

Portugal	3 – 0	Italy
Vasques 41'; Teixeira 81'; Matateu 87'	Report

Attendance: 37,000
Referee: Treichel (West Germany)

22 December 1957

Italy	3 – 0	Portugal
Gratton 36', 72'; Pivatelli 84'	Report

Attendance: 50,000
Referee: Damiani (Yugoslavia)

15 January 1958

Northern Ireland	2 – 1	Italy
McIlroy 13'; Cush 28'	Report	Da Costa 56'

Attendance: 50,000
Referee: Zsolt (Hungary)
