= José Travassos =

Portuguese footballer (1926–2002)

- Travassos (left)

Personal information
- Full name: José António Barreto Travassos
- Date of birth: 22 February 1926
- Place of birth: Lisbon, Portugal
- Date of death: 12 February 2002 (aged 75)
- Place of death: Lisbon, Portugal
- Position: Forward

Youth career
- 1942–1944: CUF

Senior career*
Years	Team	Apps	(Gls)
1944–1946	CUF		
1946–1959	Sporting CP	248	(105)

International career
1947–1958	Portugal	35	(6)
- * Club domestic league appearances and goals

José António Barreto Travassos (22 February 1926 – 12 February 2002) was a Portuguese footballer who played as a forward, mostly for Sporting CP with whom he won eight Primeira Liga championships.

== Club career ==
Born in Lisbon, Travassos joined Sporting CP in 1946 from CUF. During his spell with the club, he appeared in 321 games in all competitions and scored 128 goals, being part of an attacking line dubbed Cinco Violinos (Five Violins) that also included Albano, Jesus Correia, Fernando Peyroteo and Manuel Vasques and winning eight Primeira Liga championships and two Taça de Portugal trophies.

In the 1948–49 season, Travassos netted a career-best 16 goals to help the Lions to win the domestic league ahead of Benfica. He retired in 1959 at the age of 33.

== International career ==
Travassos won 35 caps for the Portugal national team over 11 years, scoring six times. His debut came on 5 January 1947 in a 2–2 friendly draw against Switzerland in the Portuguese capital and, 21 days later and in another home exhibition game, netted a brace to help defeat Spain 4–1.

Travassos was one of the first Portuguese footballers to reach international recognition, playing in 1955 for a FIFA side that defeated England 4–1 in Belfast and being directly involved in two of the goals. For this achievement, he was dubbed "Zé da Europa" (Europe Joe).

== Style of play ==
Travassos was known for his above-average passing and dribbling, also having the ability to score himself. Throughout his career, he was plagued by hard tackles, having three of his four menisci removed.

== Post-retirement and death ==
After retiring, Travassos ran a refrigerator business. He died in his hometown on 12 February 2002, aged 75.
