= Albano (footballer, born 1922) =

Portuguese footballer (1922–1990)

Personal information
- Full name: Albano Narciso Pereira
- Date of birth: 21 December 1922
- Place of birth: Seixal, Portugal
- Date of death: 5 March 1990 (aged 67)
- Place of death: Portugal
- Position: Forward

Youth career
- Seixal
- Barreirense

Senior career*
Years	Team	Apps	(Gls)
1941–1943	Seixal		
1943–1957	Sporting CP	242	(117)

International career
1947–1954	Portugal	15	(3)
- * Club domestic league appearances and goals

Albano Narciso Pereira (21 December 1922 – 5 March 1990), known simply as Albano, was a Portuguese footballer who played as a forward.

== Club career ==
Born in Seixal, Setúbal District, Albano joined Sporting CP in 1943 at the age of 20, from local Seixal. During his spell with the Lisbon club, he appeared in 334 games all competitions comprised and scored 162 goals, being part of an attacking line dubbed the Cinco Violinos (Five Violins) that also included Jesus Correia, Fernando Peyroteo, José Travassos and Manuel Vasques and winning eight Primeira Liga championships and four Taça de Portugal trophies.

In the 1952–53 season, Albano netted a career-best 19 goals to help the Lions win the domestic league ahead of Benfica. He retired in 1957 at the age of 34, subsequently returning to his hometown.

== International career ==
Albano won 15 caps for the Portugal national team in seven years, scoring three times. His debut came on 5 January 1947, in a 2–2 friendly draw against Switzerland in the Portuguese capital.
