= Jesus Correia =

Portuguese footballer and roller hockey player (1924–2003)

Personal information
- Full name: António Jesus Correia
- Date of birth: 3 April 1924
- Place of birth: Paço de Arcos, Portugal
- Date of death: 30 November 2003 (aged 79)
- Place of death: Portugal
- Position: Forward

Senior career*
Years	Team	Apps	(Gls)
1943–1953	Sporting CP	157	(127)
1955–1956	CUF	2	(1)
Total		159	(128)

International career
1947–1952	Portugal	13	(3)
- * Club domestic league appearances and goals

António Jesus Correia, ComIH (3 April 1924 – 30 November 2003) was a Portuguese football and roller hockey (quad) player, competing as a forward in the former sport and amassing Primeira Liga totals of 159 games and 128 goals over the course of 11 seasons, mainly with Sporting CP.

== Club career ==
Born in Paço de Arcos, Lisbon District, Jesus Correia started playing roller hockey for his local club, trying out at association football with Belenenses as a youth but finally signing with neighbouring Sporting CP. During his spell, he appeared in 208 games all competitions comprised and scored 159 goals, being part of an attacking line dubbed the Cinco Violinos (Five Violins) that also included Albano, Fernando Peyroteo, José Travassos and Manuel Vasques and winning seven Primeira Liga championships and two Taça de Portugal trophies.

In the 1946–47 season, Jesus Correia netted a career-best 28 goals in only 21 games to help the Lions win the domestic league ahead of Benfica. On 5 September 1948, in a friendly with Atlético Madrid that served as re-opening for the Estadio Metropolitano de Madrid, he scored six times in a 6–3 away victory.

Correia retired from football at the age of 28, returning to hockey after Sporting forced him to choose between the two sports. He still came back to the former in 1955, going on to have a brief stint with CUF.

== International career ==
Jesus Correia earned 13 caps for Portugal in five years, scoring three goals. His debut came on 5 January 1947 in a 2–2 friendly draw against Switzerland, in Lisbon.

Additionally, Jesus Correia was crowned Roller Hockey World Cup champion with the Portuguese hockey team six times (1946, 1947, 1948, 1949, 1952 and 1956).
