= António Araújo =

Portuguese footballer (1923–2001)

Personal information
- Full name: António de Araújo
- Date of birth: 28 September 1923
- Place of birth: Paredes, Portugal
- Date of death: 28 April 2001 (aged 77)
- Place of death: Paredes, Portugal
- Position: Forward

Senior career*
Years	Team	Apps	(Gls)
1942–1952	Porto	151	(122)

International career
1946–1948	Portugal	9	(5)
- * Club domestic league appearances and goals

António Araújo (28 September 1923 – 28 April 2001) was a former Portuguese footballer who played as forward. He only represented FC Porto during his professional career. He was also the top scorer in the 1947–48 season, being awarded the Portuguese Bola de Prata after scoring 36 goals throughout the course of the national championship.

== International career ==
Araújo played 9 games and scored 5 goals for the Portugal national team. He scored 1 goal in his debut 14 April 1946 in a 2–1 victory against France in Lisbon. He played his last game against Spain in a 2–0 loss in Madrid, 21 March 1948.
