= Henrique Ben David =

Portuguese footballer (1926–1978)

Personal information
- Full name: Henrique de Sena Ben David
- Date of birth: 5 December 1926
- Place of birth: Mindelo, Cape Verde
- Date of death: 4 December 1978 (aged 51)
- Place of death: Ponta Delgada, Portugal
- Position: Striker

Youth career
- CS Mindelo

Senior career*
Years	Team	Apps	(Gls)
1945–1947	CUF		
1947–1955	Atlético	119	(98)

International career
1950–1952	Portugal	6	(4)
- * Club domestic league appearances and goals

Henrique de Sena Ben David (5 December 1926 – 4 December 1978) was a Portuguese footballer who played as a striker. He spent most of his career with Atlético Clube de Portugal.
