= Eduardo Mourinha =

Portuguese footballer (1908–1990)

Personal information
- Full name: Eduardo Mário Mourinha de Almeida
- Date of birth: 19 December 1908
- Place of birth: Portugal
- Date of death: 31 March 1990 (aged 81)
- Position: Forward

International career
Years	Team	Apps	(Gls)
1931	Portugal	1	(0)

Eduardo Mário Mourinha de Almeida (19 December 1908 – 31 March 1990) was a Portuguese footballer who played as a forward.

== See also ==
- Association football
