= José Martins (footballer, born 1906) =

Portuguese footballer

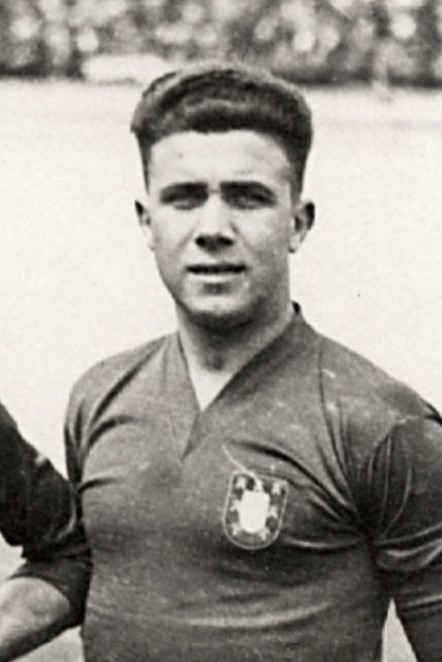
- José Martins in 1928

Personal information
- Full name: José Manuel Martins
- Date of birth: 2 September 1906
- Place of birth: Portugal
- Date of death: 5 September 1994 (aged 88)
- Position: Forward

Senior career*
Years	Team	Apps	(Gls)
1925–1929	Sporting CP		

International career
1926–1928	Portugal	11	(4)
- * Club domestic league appearances and goals

José Manuel Martins (2 September 1906 – 5 September 1994) was a Portuguese footballer. He played as a forward.

== Football career ==
Martins gained 11 caps and scored 4 goals for Portugal and was playing in the 1928 Football Olympic Tournament. He made his debut against Hungary 26 December 1926 in Porto, in a 3–3 draw, there he scored 1 goal.
