= 1945–46 Primeira Divisão =

12th season of top-tier Portuguese football

Primeira Liga
- Season: 1945–46
- Champions: CF Os Belenenses; 1st title
- Matches played: 132
- Goals scored: 638 (4.83 per match)

Statistics of Portuguese Liga in the 1945–46 season.

== Overview ==
Location of teams in the 1945–46 Liga

It was contested by 12 teams, and C.F. Os Belenenses won the championship by one point, the first time that the competition had been won by a team outside the Portuguese "Big Three" (Os Três Grandes) of Benfica, Porto and Sporting.

== League standings ==
Pos	Team	Pld	W	D	L	GF	GA	GD	Pts	Qualification or relegation
1	Belenenses (C)	22	18	2	2	74	24	+50	38	Primeira Liga champions
2	Benfica	22	17	3	2	82	29	+53	37	
3	Sporting CP	22	15	2	5	73	36	+37	32	
4	Olhanense	22	13	1	8	65	39	+26	27	
5	Atlético CP	22	8	5	9	38	55	−17	21	
6	Porto	22	9	2	11	65	44	+21	20	
7	Vitória de Setúbal	22	8	2	12	47	59	−12	18	
8	Vitória de Guimarães	22	8	2	12	39	52	−13	18	
9	SL Elvas	22	8	1	13	43	78	−35	17	
10	Académica de Coimbra	22	7	2	13	51	76	−25	16	
11	Boavista	22	6	0	16	39	73	−34	12	
12	Oliveirense (R)	22	3	2	17	22	73	−51	8	Relegation to Segunda Divisão

Source: rsssf.com
(C) Champions; (R) Relegated

== Results ==
Home \ Away	ACA	ACP	BEL	BEN	BOA	OLH	OLI	POR	ELV	SCP	VGU	VSE
Académica		2–3	1–3	3–3	5–2	1–3	6–1	2–1	5–1	5–5	2–0	3–5
Atlético CP	2–1		2–4	1–1	4–1	2–1	1–1	2–1	3–1	1–4	2–2	4–2
Belenenses	7–0	2–2		1–0	6–1	6–0	10–0	3–2	5–2	2–1	5–1	3–2
Benfica	7–1	5–0	2–0		4–2	2–1	7–2	4–0	5–1	7–2	4–1	1–1
Boavista	5–0	4–3	1–4	2–4		2–7	3–0	3–2	0–1	1–0	0–1	5–1
Olhanense	4–2	3–0	2–0	1–2	5–0		8–1	3–1	8–1	0–4	5–2	2–0
Oliveirense	2–3	1–1	0–1	2–6	2–1	2–3		2–4	0–1	1–4	1–0	2–0
Porto	8–1	11–0	0–1	2–3	3–1	3–4	4–1		9–2	0–2	3–2	2–2
SL Elvas	4–3	1–2	1–2	0–4	6–3	2–1	3–0	3–3		2–6	4–2	5–2
Sporting CP	6–1	2–1	1–1	4–3	7–1	1–0	3–0	1–0	5–2		2–3	2–3
Vitória de Guimarães	2–1	2–1	2–4	1–4	3–1	2–2	1–0	1–2	5–0	2–4		3–2
Vitória de Setúbal	2–3	3–1	1–4	1–4	5–0	3–2	3–1	1–4	5–0	0–7	3–1	

Source: rsssf.org
Legend: Blue = home team win; Yellow = draw; Red = away team win.
