= 1950–51 Primeira Divisão =

17th season of top-tier Portuguese football

Primeira Liga
- Season: 1950–51
- Champions: Sporting CP; 6th title
- Relegated: Olhanense; Vitória de Setúbal
- Matches played: 182
- Goals scored: 732 (4.02 per match)

Statistics of Portuguese Liga in the 1950–51 season.

== Overview ==
Location of teams in the 1950–51 Liga

It was contested by 14 teams, and Sporting Clube de Portugal won the championship.

== League standings ==
Pos	Team	Pld	W	D	L	GF	GA	GD	Pts	Qualification or relegation
1	Sporting CP (C)	26	21	3	2	91	28	+63	45	
2	Porto	26	15	4	7	67	32	+35	34	
3	Benfica	26	12	6	8	81	43	+38	30	
4	Atlético CP	26	12	6	8	62	49	+13	30	
5	Oriental	26	11	5	10	37	57	−20	27	
6	Sporting da Covilhã	26	13	0	13	62	53	+9	26	
7	Braga	26	10	5	11	42	57	−15	25	
8	Académica	26	10	4	12	40	53	−13	24	
9	Belenenses	26	10	4	12	45	48	−3	24	
10	Boavista	26	10	3	13	50	62	−12	23	
11	Estoril	26	10	1	15	53	58	−5	21	
12	Vitória de Setúbal (R)	26	8	4	14	31	58	−27	20	Relegation to Segunda Divisão
13	Vitória de Guimarães	26	6	6	14	40	57	−17	18	
14	Olhanense (R)	26	7	3	16	31	77	−46	17	Relegation to Segunda Divisão

Source: rsssf.org
(C) Champions; (R) Relegated

== Results ==
Home \ Away	ACA	ACP	BEL	BEN	BOA	BRA	EST	OLH	ORI	POR	SCP	SCO	VGU	VSE
Académica		1–4	2–0	0–3	3–2	0–0	4–1	4–1	5–0	1–0	1–3	5–1	3–2	1–1
Atlético CP	6–1		2–0	2–2	5–0	3–0	3–3	3–1	3–0	4–1	2–2	2–0	3–2	4–0
Belenenses	0–0	2–1		2–5	4–3	4–0	4–3	4–0	0–0	3–3	2–3	2–1	3–0	2–0
Benfica	3–2	1–1	1–1		7–1	8–2	2–3	4–0	9–0	0–2	1–3	3–2	5–0	6–0
Boavista	5–0	1–1	2–0	1–1		1–2	2–0	9–0	2–2	2–6	0–1	4–3	3–0	3–2
Braga	3–1	4–4	1–3	3–1	1–2		3–2	3–1	3–0	1–1	2–3	2–0	2–0	3–1
Estoril	0–1	5–1	0–2	0–7	1–3	2–0		5–0	3–1	2–0	1–2	5–0	3–2	3–0
Olhanense	3–0	4–1	3–2	2–0	1–0	2–2	3–2		1–2	0–4	0–4	4–2	1–1	1–1
Oriental	3–1	4–2	3–1	2–4	5–1	2–0	2–0	2–0		2–1	0–0	1–0	1–1	1–2
Porto	1–1	3–0	2–0	5–2	3–0	3–1	4–2	7–0	3–0		3–0	1–2	4–1	5–0
Sporting CP	7–0	4–1	6–2	2–2	7–0	8–0	5–3	3–0	9–0	2–1		2–1	2–3	6–0
Sporting da Covilhã	3–1	5–1	2–0	3–2	6–2	4–0	3–0	4–2	0–1	1–2	2–3		6–3	3–2
Vitória de Guimarães	0–2	3–1	3–1	3–1	0–1	1–1	1–2	6–0	2–2	2–2	0–1	1–5		1–1
Vitória de Setúbal	1–0	0–2	2–1	1–1	1–0	0–3	3–2	2–1	4–1	3–0	1–3	2–3	1–2	

Source: rsssf.org
Legend: Blue = home team win; Yellow = draw; Red = away team win.
