= Matateu =

Portuguese footballer (1927–2000)

Personal information
- Full name: Sebastião Lucas da Fonseca
- Date of birth: 26 July 1927
- Place of birth: Lourenço Marques, Mozambique
- Date of death: 27 January 2000 (aged 72)
- Place of death: British Columbia, Canada
- Position: Striker

Senior career*
Years	Team	Apps	(Gls)
1951–1964	Belenenses	270	(210)
1964–1967	Atlético	21	(9)
1967–1968	Gouveia		
1968–1969	Amora		
1969–1970	Chaves		
1970–1971	First Portuguese		
1972–1974	Sagres Victoria		

International career
1952–1960	Portugal	27	(13)
- * Club domestic league appearances and goals

Sebastião Lucas da Fonseca (26 July 1927 – 27 January 2000), known as Matateu (Portuguese pronunciation: [mɐtɐˈtew]), was a Portuguese footballer who played as a striker.

His professional career, which spanned more than 20 years, was closely associated to Belenenses. He won the Bola de Prata twice during his spell with the club, and scored 219 goals in 291 Primeira Liga games, being dubbed the World's Eighth Wonder.

Matateu's was Belenenses most-capped ever player for the Portugal national team.

== Club career ==
Born in Lourenço Marques, Portuguese Mozambique, Matateu started his career with local teams João Albasini, 1º de Maio and Manjacaze. He signed for C.F. Os Belenenses from Portugal in 1951, scoring Primeira Liga 17 goals in 26 games in his first season as the Lisbon side finished fourth and adding 29 in the same number of matches in the following campaign for a third place.

From 1953 to 1960, Matateu continued scoring in double digits (a minimum of 14 goals), netting a career-best 32 in 1954–55 for his team's final runner-up position (and his second Silver Ball award). In 1960, he helped his main club to win the Taça de Portugal against Sporting CP (2–1), his only career trophy; he left in summer 1964 at the age of 37, after only totalling four appearances in his last two seasons due to a serious leg injury from which he never fully recovered.

Matateu then joined neighbouring Atlético Clube de Portugal of the Segunda Liga, helping to promotion in his second year. In the 1966–67 season – his final in the Portuguese top flight – the 39-year-old contributed nine goals in 21 games, but the team suffered relegation after ranking second-bottom. In the next three years, he played with second-tier CD Gouveia and in amateur football with Amora F.C. and G.D. Chaves.

Matateu retired from professional football well past his 40s, after spending several years in Canada, where he represented National Soccer League side Toronto First Portuguese. In 1971 he headed westward to Victoria, British Columbia, and represented Latino in the Vancouver Island Soccer League. He also played a pivotal role in the creation of Sagres Victoria.

== International career ==
Matateu earned 27 caps for Portugal and scored 13 goals. After making his debut on 23 November 1952 in a friendly with Austria in Porto, his last appearance was against Yugoslavia on 22 May 1960 for the 1960 European Nations' Cup (5–1 away loss, he netted in the first leg, a 2–1 win), aged 32.

Matateu never played internationally with his compatriot Eusébio although he had been called for the final 1962 FIFA World Cup qualifiers where the latter would make his debut, being left out of the squads for the matches against Luxembourg and England.

== Personal life and death ==
Matateu's younger brother, Vicente, was also a footballer. A defender, he played 13 years with Belenenses (sharing teams with his sibling during ten), and also appeared for the Portugal national team. His daughter Argentina, born in 1954 from a relationship with a Portuguese woman, was named like that as he received the news at half-time of a friendly against Argentina.

Matateu died on 27 January 2000 at 72, in the Victoria General Hospital in British Columbia, after a long battle with illness.
