= Manuel Vasques =

Portuguese footballer (1926–2003)

Personal information
- Full name: Manuel Soeiro Vasques
- Date of birth: 29 July 1926
- Place of birth: Barreiro, Portugal
- Date of death: 10 July 2003 (aged 76)
- Place of death: Portugal
- Position: Forward

Senior career*
Years	Team	Apps	(Gls)
1943–1946	CUF		
1946–1959	Sporting CP	278	(190)
1959–1960	Atlético	4	(1)
Total		282	(191)

International career
1948–1957	Portugal	26	(8)
- * Club domestic league appearances and goals

Manuel Soeiro Vasques (29 July 1926 – 10 July 2003) was a Portuguese footballer who played as a forward.

== Club career ==
Born in Barreiro, Setúbal District, Vasques joined Sporting CP in 1946, from local club CUF. During his spell in Lisbon he appeared in 349 games all competitions comprised and scored 225 goals, being part of an attacking line dubbed the Cinco Violinos (Five Violins) that also included Albano, Jesus Correia, Fernando Peyroteo and José Travassos and winning ten major titles, including eight Primeira Liga championships.

In the 1950–51 season, Vasques led the scoring charts with 29 goals to help the Lions win the domestic league 11 points ahead of second-placed Porto.

== International career ==
Vasques won 26 caps for the Portugal national team over nine years, netting eight times. His debut came on 21 March 1948 in a 3–0 friendly loss against Spain, in Madrid.

== Personal life ==
Vasques' uncle, Manuel Soeiro, was also a footballer. He too played for Sporting and Portugal.
