= 1946–47 Primeira Divisão =

13th season of top-tier Portuguese football

Primeira Liga
- Season: 1946–47
- Champions: Sporting CP; 3rd title
- Relegated: AD Sanjoanense; F.C. Famalicão
- Matches played: 182
- Goals scored: 933 (5.13 per match)

Statistics of Portuguese Liga in the 1946–47 season.

== Overview ==
Location of teams in the 1946–47 Liga

It was contested by 14 teams, and Sporting Clube de Portugal won the championship.

== League standings ==
Pos	Team	Pld	W	D	L	GF	GA	GD	Pts	Qualification or relegation
1	Sporting CP (C)	26	23	1	2	123	40	+83	47	
2	Benfica	26	20	1	5	99	47	+52	41	
3	Belenenses	26	14	5	7	66	31	+35	33	
4	Porto	26	15	3	8	73	45	+28	33	
5	Estoril	26	16	1	9	96	55	+41	33	
6	Olhanense	26	11	4	11	69	73	−4	26	
7	Atlético CP	26	11	3	12	56	61	−5	25	
8	Vitória de Guimarães	26	8	8	10	54	54	0	24	
9	Boavista	26	7	6	13	52	74	−22	20	
10	SL Elvas	26	9	2	15	65	89	−24	20	
11	Académica	26	8	4	14	49	96	−47	20	
12	Vitória de Setúbal	26	8	4	14	45	50	−5	20	
13	Famalicão (R)	26	7	3	16	60	100	−40	17	Relegation to Segunda Divisão
14	Sanjoanense (R)	26	2	1	23	26	118	−92	5	Relegation to Segunda Divisão

Source: rsssf.com
(C) Champions; (R) Relegated

== Results ==
Home \ Away	ACA	ACP	BEL	BEN	BOA	EST	FAM	OLH	POR	SJN	ELV	SCP	VGU	VSE
Académica		3–2	2–0	3–3	4–3	3–5	4–2	2–3	2–1	5–2	4–3	1–3	1–1	1–0
Atlético CP	4–0		1–1	3–2	5–0	3–4	5–1	2–2	1–3	2–0	4–2	1–6	2–0	1–0
Belenenses	5–1	1–1		2–1	7–1	4–0	8–0	5–1	0–2	7–0	2–1	2–0	1–1	3–2
Benfica	4–1	3–0	3–1		6–2	3–1	5–1	4–1	4–0	13–1	3–2	3–1	4–1	3–2
Boavista	7–1	2–1	1–1	1–3		2–2	5–0	1–1	3–3	6–1	4–1	2–4	1–2	4–0
Estoril	6–1	6–2	0–3	6–3	1–2		3–2	6–1	3–1	9–0	9–1	2–4	5–0	8–0
Famalicão	6–1	2–4	1–5	1–5	2–2	2–6		2–3	2–1	7–3	5–3	5–9	3–3	2–1
Olhanense	12–0	4–0	3–0	1–6	1–0	4–2	6–1		2–4	5–0	4–1	3–5	0–0	1–1
Porto	4–2	1–0	0–0	3–2	6–0	2–1	3–3	10–2		6–0	3–1	2–4	3–2	5–0
Sanjoanense	1–1	1–3	2–3	2–4	1–0	1–3	3–4	1–5	0–3		3–0	2–6	0–1	1–4
SL Elvas	3–2	2–1	1–0	3–5	8–1	3–5	2–1	4–3	3–1	8–0		3–5	2–2	4–3
Sporting CP	9–1	9–2	3–0	6–1	4–1	5–0	7–3	8–0	3–2	4–0	9–1		3–1	3–0
Vitória de Guimarães	2–2	4–3	1–4	2–5	8–0	1–2	3–1	5–0	1–4	6–1	3–3	1–2		1–1
Vitória de Setúbal	5–1	2–3	2–1	0–1	1–1	2–1	0–1	3–1	4–0	3–0	7–0	1–1	1–2	

Legend: Blue = home team win; Yellow = draw; Red = away team win.
