= 1948–49 Primeira Divisão =

15th season of top-tier Portuguese football

Primeira Liga
- Season: 1948–49
- Champions: Sporting CP; 5th title
- Relegated: Boavista
- Matches played: 182
- Goals scored: 768 (4.22 per match)

Statistics of Portuguese Liga in the 1948–49 season.

== Overview ==
Location of teams in the 1948–49 Liga

It was contested by 14 teams, and Sporting Clube de Portugal won the championship.

== League standings ==
Pos	Team	Pld	W	D	L	GF	GA	GD	Pts	Qualification or relegation
1	Sporting CP (C)	26	20	2	4	100	35	+65	42	
2	Benfica	26	17	3	6	72	34	+38	37	
3	Belenenses	26	16	3	7	68	36	+32	35	
4	Porto	26	16	1	9	55	37	+18	33	
5	Estoril	26	12	5	9	76	54	+22	29	
6	Vitória de Guimarães	26	11	4	11	47	50	−3	26	
7	Olhanense	26	10	4	12	51	55	−4	24	
8	Braga	26	11	2	13	39	54	−15	24	
9	O Elvas	26	7	7	12	46	61	−15	21	
10	Atlético CP	26	8	5	13	44	68	−24	21	
11	Sporting da Covilhã	26	9	2	15	50	59	−9	20	
12	Vitória de Setúbal	26	8	4	14	39	61	−22	20	
13	Lusitano VRSA	26	7	4	15	23	52	−29	18	
14	Boavista (R)	26	4	6	16	35	89	−54	14	Relegation to Segunda Divisão

Source: rsssf.com
(C) Champions; (R) Relegated

== Results ==
Home \ Away	ACP	BEL	BEN	BOA	BRA	EST	LUS	ELV	OLH	POR	SCP	SCO	VGU	VSE
Atlético CP		1–7	1–2	1–1	4–3	3–3	3–0	3–1	1–1	3–2	0–3	5–1	1–2	5–1
Belenenses	4–0		0–1	5–0	5–0	6–2	3–1	5–2	2–1	3–1	1–4	6–1	3–0	3–1
Benfica	3–1	0–2		7–0	4–0	1–2	2–1	6–0	1–0	1–1	3–3	6–1	5–0	6–0
Boavista	3–3	1–1	1–4		2–1	1–2	6–1	1–2	5–1	1–5	0–0	2–1	1–1	1–1
Braga	2–1	3–1	3–4	4–2		2–1	3–1	1–1	0–1	2–0	1–0	2–1	1–1	2–0
Estoril	3–1	2–0	1–3	8–1	6–1		2–2	2–2	6–1	5–1	2–4	2–2	4–2	5–0
Lusitano VRSA	0–1	1–1	1–2	1–0	2–0	1–1		2–1	2–1	1–0	0–2	2–1	1–0	0–1
O Elvas	7–0	1–1	0–1	3–0	4–1	4–2	1–1		2–2	2–0	3–4	0–1	3–2	3–3
Olhanense	4–1	2–3	2–1	10–3	3–2	2–7	1–0	4–1		1–2	3–7	4–0	2–0	1–0
Porto	3–0	2–0	4–3	3–1	0–1	2–1	3–0	3–1	2–0		1–0	4–1	4–2	6–1
Sporting CP	5–1	5–1	5–1	12–1	4–0	5–3	7–1	7–1	3–1	1–2		7–2	3–0	3–1
Sporting da Covilhã	1–2	1–2	1–0	4–0	2–0	1–3	3–0	5–0	1–1	1–2	5–2		6–2	6–2
Vitória de Guimarães	1–1	2–1	3–3	3–1	3–2	4–1	5–0	3–0	1–0	2–1	1–3	1–0		5–0
Vitória de Setúbal	5–1	1–2	1–2	5–0	1–2	2–0	2–1	1–1	2–2	3–1	0–1	2–1	3–1	

Source: rsssf.com
Legend: Blue = home team win; Yellow = draw; Red = away team win.
