= Primeira Liga =

Portuguese association football league

- Organising body: Liga Portuguesa de Futebol Profissional (LPFP)
- Founded: 1934; 92 years ago
- Country: Portugal
- Confederation: UEFA
- Chairman: Reinaldo Teixeira
- Number of clubs: 18 (since 2014–15)
- Level on pyramid: 1
- Relegation to: Liga Portugal 2 (1990–present); Segunda Divisão (1934–1990)
- Domestic cup(s): Taça de Portugal; Supertaça Cândido de Oliveira
- League cup: Taça da Liga
- International cup(s): UEFA Champions League; UEFA Europa League; UEFA Conference League
- Current champions: Porto (31st title) (2025–26)
- Most championships: Benfica (38 titles)
- Most appearances: Manuel Fernandes (486)
- Top scorer: Fernando Peyroteo (332)
- Broadcaster: Sport TV (Portugal)
- Sponsor: Betclic
- Website: ligaportugal.pt
- Current: 2026–27 Primeira Liga

The Primeira Liga (Portuguese pronunciation: [pɾiˈmɐjɾɐ ˈliɣɐ]), also known as Liga Portugal Betclic for sponsorship reasons, is a professional association football league in Portugal and the highest level of the Portuguese football league system. Organised and supervised by the Liga Portugal, it has been contested by 18 teams since the 2014–15 season, with the three lowest-placed teams relegated to the Liga Portugal 2 and replaced by the top-three non-reserve teams from this division. (Note: In the 2018–19 season, the three lowest placed teams were relegated to the LigaPro due to the integration of Gil Vicente in the Primeira Liga in the following season. The Portuguese Football Federation appealed to proceed with this integration as soon as possible.)

Founded in 1934 as Campeonato da Liga da Primeira Divisão, it was named Campeonato Nacional da Primeira Divisão from 1938 until 1999, when it was changed to its current naming. Over 70 teams have competed in the Primeira Liga, but only five have been crowned champions. Among them, the "Big Three" teams—Benfica (38 wins), Porto (31) and Sporting CP (21)—have won all but two Primeira Liga titles; the other winners are Belenenses (1945–46) and Boavista (2000–01).

The Primeira Liga reached a world ranking of fourth according to IFFHS's 2011 ranking.

== History ==
Before the Portuguese football reform of 1938, a competition on a round-basis was already being held – the Primeira Liga (Premier League) and the winners of that competition were named "League champions". Despite that, a Championship of Portugal in a knock-out cup format was the most popular and defined the Portuguese champion, although the winners of this competition no longer count as Portuguese football champions.

Then, with the reform, a round-robin basis competition was implemented as the most important of the calendar and began defining the Portuguese champion. From 1938 to 1999, the name Campeonato Nacional da Primeira Divisão (National Championship of the First Division) or just Primeira Divisão (First Division), was used.

Porto won the inaugural edition of the new league championship and successfully defended the title in the next season. In 1939–40 the tournament was expanded from eight to ten clubs, due to an administrative battle between Porto and Académico do Porto, regarding a Regional Championship game that ended with only 43 minutes after the start, and later repeated (which FC Porto won) according to Porto FA decision. FPF came out with a decision to satisfy both clubs, expanding the championship to 10 teams (one more from Porto FA and another from Setúbal FA) and annulling the result from the repetition match. With this decision, FC Porto lost the Regional title and finished in 3rd, Leixões SC became the new regional champion, while Académico was 2nd place. All 3 teams qualified for 1939–40 Primeira Divisão.

In the 1941–42 season, it was decided to expand the championship from eight to ten teams to admit Braga FA and Algarve FA champions (until this season only the top teams from Porto, Coimbra, Lisboa and Setúbal were admitted). Porto finished the regional championship in third place again, which did not grant entry into the Primeira Liga. However, a second expand (from 10 to 12) in the same season was decided, which allowed the club to participate.

After the 1945–46 season, the qualifying system based on regional championships was abandoned and adopted a pyramid system, with relegations and promotions between the 3 tiers. The clubs in Primeira Divisão, Segunda Divisão and Terceira Divisão no longer had to play their district championships on the same season as they had been doing since the first seasons of the Liga. Below is a complete record of how many teams played in each season throughout the league's history;

- 8 clubs: 1934–1939
- 10 clubs: 1939–1940
- 8 clubs: 1940–1941
- 12 clubs: 1941–1942
- 10 clubs: 1942–1945
- 12 clubs: 1945–1946
- 14 clubs: 1946–1971
- 16 clubs: 1971–1987
- 20 clubs: 1987–1989
- 18 clubs: 1989–1990
- 20 clubs: 1990–1991
- 18 clubs: 1991–2006
- 16 clubs: 2006–2014
- 18 clubs: 2014–present

When the Portuguese League for Professional Football took control of the two nationwide leagues in 1999, it was renamed "Primeira Liga" (Premier League).

=== Big Three ===
"Big Three" performance over the last 10 seasons
Season	Benfica	Porto	Sporting
2016–17	1	2	3
2017–18	2	1	3
2018–19	1	2	3
2019–20	2	1	4
2020–21	3	2	1
2021–22	3	1	2
2022–23	1	2	4
2023–24	2	3	1
2024–25	2	3	1
2025–26	3	1	2

"The Big Three" (Portuguese: Os Três Grandes) is a nickname for the three most powerful sports clubs in Portugal. With the exception of Belenenses in 1945–46 and Boavista in 2000–01, only three clubs have won the Primeira Liga title – Benfica (38 times), Porto (30) and Sporting CP (21). These three clubs generally end up sharing the top three positions (thus, appearing more frequently in UEFA competitions) and are the only clubs to have played in every season of the competition.

These clubs dominate Portuguese football, and it has become typical for fans to support any of these teams as a "first club", with a local team probably coming afterwards, if at all. The "Big Three" have the highest average attendance ratings every season in Portugal, while many other teams, lacking support from the locals, have suffered from poor attendance. The lack of support for local teams is considered to be one of the main reasons why Portuguese Football registers one of the worst attendance ratings in European Football's best championships, alongside the broadcast of almost all the games on television. In other sports, the rivalry between the big clubs is also considerable and it usually leads to arguments between the fans and players.

Benfica is the club with most league, cup and league cup titles, as well as the most domestic titles (81) and overall titles won (83 or 84, if the Latin Cup is taken into account), including back-to-back European Cup trophies. Porto is the club with most Portuguese Super Cups and international titles won (7).

Sporting CP holds the third place when it comes to the most league and cup titles. Benfica is the only Portuguese club to have won two consecutive European Cup/UEFA Champions League titles, reaching ten European finals: seven European Cups and three UEFA Cup/Europa League, and was runner-up in two Intercontinental Cups. Porto is the only Portuguese club since 1987 to have won any international competition (excluding the UEFA Intertoto Cup), gathering a total of two European Cup/UEFA Champions Leagues, two UEFA Cup/Europa Leagues, one European Super Cup and two Intercontinental Cups and finished runner-up in one European Cup Winner's Cup and three UEFA Super Cups. Sporting won one European Cup Winner's Cup and was runner-up in one UEFA Cup. Apart from the big three, Braga won the last UEFA Intertoto Cup and was runner-up in one UEFA Europa League.

=== Sponsored names ===
Galp Energia acquired the naming rights to the league in 2002, titling the division SuperLiga Galp Energia. A four-year deal with Austrian sports betting firm bwin was announced on 18 August 2005 amid questioning by the other gambling authorities in Portugal (the Santa Casa da Misericórdia and the Portuguese Casinos Association), who claimed to hold the exclusive rights to legal gambling games in Portuguese national territory. After holding the name Liga betandwin.com for the 2005–06 season, the name was changed to bwin LIGA in July 2006.

From the 2008–09 season to the 2009–10 season the league was named Liga Sagres due to sponsorship from Sagres beer. In 2010, they renewed the sponsorship from Sagres, but also got the sponsorship from ZON Multimédia. The league was named Liga ZON Sagres until 2013–14 after the sponsorship agreement between Sagres, ZON (now NOS) and the league ended. In 2015, the league was named Liga NOS until the 2020–21 season. From 2021 to 2023, it was known Liga Portugal Bwin. Since 2023, it is called Liga Portugal Betclic.

Sponsorship names for seasons

- 2002–2005: SuperLiga Galp Energia
- 2005–2006: Liga betandwin.com
- 2006–2008: bwin LIGA
- 2008–2010: Liga Sagres
- 2010–2014: Liga ZON Sagres
- 2014–2021: Liga NOS
- 2021–2023: Liga Portugal Bwin
- 2023–: Liga Portugal Betclic

=== Official match ball ===
- 2002–2004: Adidas Fevernova
- 2004–2006: Adidas Roteiro
- 2006–2007: Adidas +Teamgeist
- 2008: Adidas Europass
- 2008–2009: Adidas Europass Portugal
- 2009–2010: Adidas Terrapass Liga Sagres
- 2010–2011: Adidas Jabulani
- 2011: Adidas Speedcell
- 2012: Adidas Tango 12
- 2013: Adidas Cafusa
- 2014: Adidas Brazuca
- 2015: Adidas Conext15
- 2016: Adidas Errejota
- 2016–18: Nike Ordem
- 2018–19: Nike Merlin
- 2019–22: Select Brillant Super TB
- 2023–26: Puma Orbita

== Competition ==
Since the 2014–15 season, there are 18 clubs in the Primeira Liga, up from 16 in the previous seasons. During the course of a season, each club plays all teams twice – once at their home stadium and once at their opponent's stadium – for a total of 34 games. At the end of each season, the two lowest placed teams are relegated to the Segunda Liga and the top two teams from Segunda Liga are promoted to the Primeira Liga.

=== Qualification for European competitions ===
The top teams in Primeira Liga qualify for the UEFA Champions League, with the winner entering the group stage directly. The second placed team enters the playoffs for the group stage of the UEFA Champions League; if they fail to qualify, they enter the UEFA Europa League, along with the Taça de Portugal cup winners. If the Taça de Portugal cup winners qualify for the UEFA Champions League through league placing, the berth is given to the third placed team, who otherwise enter the UEFA Europa League qualification. The number four enters the qualification stages of the UEFA Conference League.

== UEFA ranking ==
UEFA League Ranking as of the 2026–27 season:

1. (England) Premier League
2. (Italy) Serie A
3. (Spain) La Liga
4. (Germany) Bundesliga
5. (France) Ligue 1
6. (Portugal) Primeira Liga
7. (Belgium) Belgian Pro League
8. (Netherlands) Eredivisie
9. (Turkey) Süper Lig
10. (Poland) Ekstraklasa

== Clubs ==
Locations of teams in the 2025–26 Primeira Liga.
Locations of teams in the 2025–26 Primeira Liga from the Lisbon area
Locations of teams in the 2025–26 Primeira Liga from Madeira.
Locations of teams in the 2025–26 Primeira Liga from Azores.

Team	Location	Stadium	Capacity	1st season in Primeira Liga	No. of seasons in Primeira Liga	1st season of current spell	No. of seasons of current spell	League titles	Last title
Alverca^{↑}	Alverca do Ribatejo	Complexo Desportivo FC Alverca	6,932	1998–99	7	2025–26	3	0	-
Arouca	Arouca	Estádio Municipal de Arouca	5,600	2013–14	5	2021–22	0	0	-
AVS	Vila das Aves	Estádio do Clube Desportivo das Aves	6,230	2024–25	1	2025–26	1	0	-
Benfica	Lisbon	Estádio da Luz	68,100	1934–35	90	1934–35	90	38	2022–23
Braga	Braga	Estádio Municipal de Braga	30,286	1947–48	68	1975–76	49	0	-
Casa Pia	Lisbon	Estádio Municipal de Rio Maior, at Rio Maior (Note: As the Estádio Pina Manique did not meet the standards to host Primeira Liga matches, Casa Pia played their home matches at the Estádio Municipal de Rio Maior in Rio Maior.)	7,000	1938–39	3	2022–23	2	0	-
Estoril Praia	Estoril	Estádio António Coimbra da Mota	5,094	1944–45	29	2021–22	3	0	-
Estrela da Amadora	Amadora	Estádio José Gomes	9,288	1988–89	16	2023–24	1	0	-
Famalicão	Vila Nova de Famalicão	Estádio Municipal de Famalicão	5,186	1946–47	10	2019–20	5	0	-
Gil Vicente	Barcelos	Estádio Cidade de Barcelos	12,046	1990–91	24	2019–20	5	0	-
Moreirense	Guimarães	Estádio Comendador Joaquim de Almeida Freitas	6,150	2002–03	12	2023–24	1	0	-
Nacional	Funchal	Estádio da Madeira	5,200	1988–89	21	2024–25	1	0	-
Porto	Porto	Estádio do Dragão	50,033	1934–35	90	1934–35	90	31	2025-26
Rio Ave	Vila do Conde	Estadio dos Arcos	5,300	1979–80	29	2022–23	2	0	-
Santa Clara	Ponta Delgada	Estádio de São Miguel	12,500	1999–2000	9	2024–25	1	0	-
Sporting CP	Lisbon	Estádio José Alvalade	52,095	1934–35	90	1934–35	90	21	2024–25
Tondela^{↑}	Tondela	Estádio João Cardoso	5,000	2015–16	7	2025–26	0	0	-
Vitória de Guimarães	Guimarães	Estádio D. Afonso Henriques	30,029	1941–42	79	2007–08	17	0	-

== League attendance record ==
Since the beginning of the league, there are three clubs with an attendance much higher than the others: Benfica, Porto and Sporting CP. They have also the biggest stadiums in Portugal, with more than 50,000 seats. Other clubs, such as Vitória de Guimarães and Braga, also have good attendances. Académica de Coimbra, Vitória de Setúbal, Boavista, Belenenses, and Marítimo are historical clubs, with more than 40 top-flight seasons, from the biggest Portuguese cities, and have also many supporters. However, they do not have big attendances nowadays. Their stadiums have between 10,000 and 30,000 seats.

In the 2023–24 season, Liga Portugal broke the record for stadium attendance in the last 12 years of Liga records, with an increase of more than 10% compared to the previous season. The total accumulated audience figures were 3,707,290 and 556,267 people, giving an average attendance of 12,115 and 1,818 spectators in the Primeira and Segunda Liga, respectively. It's also the highest in the last 34 years and the only one to pass the 12,000 barrier since the 1989–90 season.

This is due to the League's joint initiative with Continente "É Para Cartão" to bring families back to the stadiums. The slogan "Football is You" was a success, as this season many historic clubs in lower leagues managed to have much higher averages than several clubs in the Primeira Liga.

In the following season, 2024-25, the league once again set a new record for stadium attendance, with a 1.5% increase on the previous season. The total accumulated audience totalled 3,761,888 people, giving an average attendance of 12,294 spectators. This is the highest this season and the second time since the 1989/90 season that the 12,000 barrier has been surpassed. This is mainly due to the rise in the averages of Benfica, Sporting, Porto, Vitória de Guimarães, Farense and Gil Vicente, who are the only clubs to have improved their averages, while the rest of the clubs have fallen considerably.

The record season of 2024–25 saw the following statistics per club:

#	Club	Games	Average	Attendance	Accumulated	Stadium capacity	Stadium
1st	SL Benfica	17	58.746	91.4%	998.680	65.592	Estádio da Luz
2nd	Sporting CP	17	42.529	84.95%	722.987	50.095	Estádio José Alvalade
3rd	FC Porto	17	40.609	81.16%	690.356	50.033	Estádio do Dragão
4th	Vitória SC	17	18.447	62.61%	313.605	30.029	Estádio D. Afonso Henriques
5th	SC Braga	17	13.868	49.18%	235.755	30.286	Estádio Municipal de Braga
6th	Boavista FC	17	7.212	26.35%	122.596	28.263	Estádio do Bessa
7th	SC Farense	17	7.165	67.96%	121.812	7.000	Estádio de São Luís
7th	SC Farense	17	7.165	67.96%	121.812	22.000	Estádio Algarve
8th	Gil Vicente FC	17	5.496	45.69%	93.437	12.046	Estádio Cidade de Barcelos
9th	FC Famalicão	17	3.781	72.4%	64.285	5.186	Estádio Municipal 22 de Junho
10th	Estrela Amadora	17	3.704	55.74%	62.972	9.288	Estádio José Gomes
11th	Santa Clara	17	3.074	30.74%	52.264	12.500	Estádio de São Miguel
12th	Estoril Praia	17	2.723	53.45%	46.290	5.094	Estádio António Coimbra da Mota
13th	Rio Ave FC	17	2.591	42.32%	44.043	5.300	Estádio do Rio Ave FC
14th	AVS SAD	17	2.407	41.74%	40.919	6.230	Estádio do CD Aves
15th	CD Nacional	17	2.396	46.54%	40.724	5.200	Estádio da Madeira
16th	Moreirense FC	17	2.387	38.79%	40.575	6.150	Parque Comendador Joaquim de Almeida Freitas
17th	FC Arouca	17	2.111	42.76%	35.889	5.600	Estádio Municipal de Arouca
18th	Casa Pia AC	17	2.043	29.26%	34.729	7.000	Estádio Municipal de Rio Maior
Total Estimate		306	12.294	53.50%	3.761,888	340.898 (Note: In the case of Farense, only the São Luís Stadium is considered.)	

== List of champions and top scorers ==
Clubs									Players		
Season	Champions	Points	Runners-up	Points	Third place	Points	Teams	Rounds	Bola de Prata (top scorer)	Club	Goals
Campeonato da Liga da Primeira Divisão
1934–35	Porto	22	Sporting CP	20	Benfica	19	8	14	(Portugal) Manuel Soeiro	Sporting CP	14
1935–36	Benfica	21	Porto	20	Sporting CP	18	8	14	(Portugal) Pinga	Porto	21
1936–37	Benfica (2)	24	Belenenses	23	Sporting CP	19	8	14	(Portugal) Manuel Soeiro	Sporting CP	24
1937–38	Benfica (3)	23	Porto	23	Sporting CP	22	8	14	(Portugal) Fernando Peyroteo	Sporting CP	34
Campeonato Nacional da Primeira Divisão
1938–39	Porto (2)	23	Sporting CP	22	Benfica	21	8	14	(Portugal) Costuras	Porto	18
1939–40	Porto (3)	34	Sporting CP	32	Belenenses	25	10	18	(Portugal) F. Peyroteo / (Kingdom of Yugoslavia) S. Kodrnja	Sporting CP / Porto	29
1940–41	Sporting CP	23	Porto	20	Belenenses	19	8	14	(Portugal) Fernando Peyroteo	Sporting CP	29
1941–42	Benfica (4)	38	Sporting CP	34	Belenenses	30	12	22	(Portugal) Correia Dias	Porto	36
1942–43	Benfica (5)	30	Sporting CP	29	Belenenses	28	10	18	(Portugal) Julinho	Benfica	24
1943–44	Sporting CP (2)	31	Benfica	26	Atlético CP	24	10	18	(Portugal) Francisco Rodrigues	Vitória de Setúbal	28
1944–45	Benfica (6)	30	Belenenses	27	Sporting CP	27	10	18	(Portugal) Francisco Rodrigues	Vitória de Setúbal	21
1945–46	Belenenses	38	Benfica	37	Sporting CP	32	12	22	(Portugal) Fernando Peyroteo	Sporting CP	37
1946–47	Sporting CP (3)	47	Benfica	41	Porto	33	14	26	(Portugal) Fernando Peyroteo	Sporting CP	43
1947–48	Sporting CP (4)	41	Benfica	41	Belenenses	37	14	26	(Portugal) António Araújo	Porto	36
1948–49	Sporting CP (5)	42	Benfica	37	Belenenses	35	14	26	(Portugal) Fernando Peyroteo	Sporting CP	40
1949–50	Benfica (7)	45	Sporting CP	39	Atlético CP	30	14	26	(Portugal) Julinho	Benfica	29
1950–51	Sporting CP (6)	45	Porto	34	Benfica	30	14	26	(Portugal) Manuel Vasques	Sporting CP	29
1951–52	Sporting CP (7)	41	Benfica	40	Porto	36	14	26	(Portugal) José Águas	Benfica	28
1952–53	Sporting CP (8)	43	Benfica	39	Belenenses	36	14	26	(Portugal) Matateu	Belenenses	29
1953–54	Sporting CP (9)	43	Porto	36	Benfica	32	14	26	(Portugal) João Martins	Sporting CP	31
1954–55	Benfica (8)	39	Belenenses	39	Sporting CP	37	14	26	(Portugal) Matateu	Belenenses	32
1955–56	Porto (4)	43	Benfica	43	Belenenses	37	14	26	(Portugal) José Águas	Benfica	28
1956–57	Benfica (9)	41	Porto	40	Belenenses	33	14	26	(Portugal) José Águas	Benfica	30
1957–58	Sporting CP (10)	43	Porto	43	Benfica	36	14	26	(Portugal) Arsénio Duarte	CUF do Barreiro	23
1958–59	Porto (5)	41	Benfica	41	Belenenses	38	14	26	(Portugal) José Águas	Benfica	26
1959–60	Benfica (10)	45	Sporting CP	43	Belenenses	36	14	26	(Brazil) Edmur Ribeiro	Vitória de Guimarães	25
1960–61	Benfica (11)	46	Sporting CP	42	Porto	33	14	26	(Portugal) José Águas	Benfica	27
1961–62	Sporting CP (11)	43	Porto	41	Benfica	36	14	26	(Brazil) Veríssimo	Porto	23
1962–63	Benfica (12)	48	Porto	42	Sporting CP	38	14	26	(Portugal) José Augusto Torres	Benfica	26
1963–64	Benfica (13)	46	Porto	40	Sporting CP	34	14	26	(Portugal) Eusébio	Benfica	28
1964–65	Benfica (14)	43	Porto	37	CUF do Barreiro	35	14	26	(Portugal) Eusébio	Benfica	28
1965–66	Sporting CP (12)	42	Benfica	41	Porto	34	14	26	(Portugal) Eusébio / (Portugal) E. Figueiredo	Benfica / Sporting CP	25
1966–67	Benfica (15)	43	Académica	40	Porto	39	14	26	(Portugal) Eusébio	Benfica	31
1967–68	Benfica (16)	41	Sporting CP	37	Porto	36	14	26	(Portugal) Eusébio	Benfica	42
1968–69	Benfica (17)	39	Porto	37	Vitória de Guimarães	36	14	26	(Portugal) Manuel António	Académica	19
1969–70	Sporting CP (13)	46	Benfica	38	Vitória de Setúbal	36	14	26	(Portugal) Eusébio	Benfica	20
1970–71	Benfica (18)	41	Sporting CP	38	Porto	37	14	26	(Portugal) Artur Jorge	Benfica	23
1971–72	Benfica (19)	55	Vitória de Setúbal	45	Sporting CP	43	16	30	(Portugal) Artur Jorge	Benfica	27
1972–73	Benfica (20)	58	Belenenses	40	Vitória de Setúbal	38	16	30	(Portugal) Eusébio	Benfica	40
1973–74	Sporting CP (14)	49	Benfica	47	Vitória de Setúbal	45	16	30	(Argentina) Héctor Yazalde	Sporting CP	46
1974–75	Benfica (21)	49	Porto	44	Sporting CP	43	16	30	(Argentina) Héctor Yazalde	Sporting CP	30
1975–76	Benfica (22)	50	Boavista	48	Belenenses	40	16	30	(Portugal) Rui Jordão	Benfica	30
1976–77	Benfica (23)	51	Sporting CP	42	Porto	41	16	30	(Portugal) Fernando Gomes	Porto	26
1977–78	Porto (6)	51	Benfica	51	Sporting CP	42	16	30	(Portugal) Fernando Gomes	Porto	25
1978–79	Porto (7)	50	Benfica	49	Sporting CP	42	16	30	(Portugal) Fernando Gomes	Porto	27
1979–80	Sporting CP (15)	52	Porto	50	Benfica	45	16	30	(Portugal) Rui Jordão	Sporting CP	31
1980–81	Benfica (24)	50	Porto	48	Sporting CP	37	16	30	(Portugal) Nené	Benfica	20
1981–82	Sporting CP (16)	46	Benfica	44	Porto	43	16	30	(Portugal) Jacques Pereira	Porto	27
1982–83	Benfica (25)	51	Porto	47	Sporting CP	42	16	30	(Portugal) Fernando Gomes	Porto	36
1983–84	Benfica (26)	52	Porto	49	Sporting CP	42	16	30	(Portugal) Fernando Gomes / Nené	Porto / Benfica	21
1984–85	Porto (8)	55	Sporting CP	47	Benfica	43	16	30	(Portugal) Fernando Gomes	Porto	39
1985–86	Porto (9)	49	Benfica	47	Sporting CP	46	16	30	(Portugal) Manuel Fernandes	Sporting CP	30
1986–87	Benfica (27)	48	Porto	46	Vitória de Guimarães	41	16	30	(Brazil) Paulinho Cascavel	Vitória de Guimarães	22
1987–88	Porto (10)	66	Benfica	51	Belenenses	48	20	38	(Brazil) Paulinho Cascavel	Sporting CP	23
1988–89	Benfica (28)	63	Porto	56	Boavista	49	20	38	(Angola) Vata	Benfica	16
1989–90	Porto (11)	59	Benfica	55	Sporting CP	46	18	34	(Sweden) Mats Magnusson	Benfica	33
1990–91	Benfica (29)	69	Porto	67	Sporting CP	57	20	38	(Portugal) Rui Águas	Benfica	25
1991–92	Porto (12)	56	Benfica	46	Boavista	44	18	34	(Nigeria) Ricky	Boavista	30
1992–93	Porto (13)	54	Benfica	52	Sporting CP	45	18	34	(Portugal) Jorge Cadete	Sporting CP	18
1993–94	Benfica (30)	54	Porto	52	Sporting CP	51	18	34	(Nigeria) Rashidi Yekini	Vitória de Setúbal	21
1994–95	Porto (14)	62	Sporting CP	53	Benfica	49	18	34	(Morocco) Hassan Nader	Farense	21
1995–96	Porto (15)	84	Benfica	73	Sporting CP	67	18	34	(Portugal) Domingos Paciência	Porto	25
1996–97	Porto (16)	85	Sporting CP	72	Benfica	58	18	34	(Brazil) Mário Jardel	Porto	30
1997–98	Porto (17)	77	Benfica	68	Vitória de Guimarães	59	18	34	(Brazil) Mário Jardel	Porto	26
1998–99	Porto (18)	79	Boavista	71	Benfica	65	18	34	(Brazil) Mário Jardel	Porto	36
Primeira Liga
1999–2000	Sporting CP (17)	77	Porto	73	Benfica	69	18	34	(Brazil) Mário Jardel	Porto	37
2000–01	Boavista	77	Porto	76	Sporting CP	62	18	34	(Brazil) Pena	Porto	22
2001–02	Sporting CP (18)	75	Boavista	70	Porto	68	18	34	(Brazil) Mário Jardel	Sporting CP	42
2002–03	Porto (19)	86	Benfica	75	Sporting CP	59	18	34	(Senegal) Fary Faye / (Portugal) Simão	Beira-Mar / Benfica	18
2003–04	Porto (20)	82	Benfica	74	Sporting CP	73	18	34	(South Africa) Benni McCarthy	Porto	20
2004–05	Benfica (31)	65	Porto	62	Sporting CP	61	18	34	(Brazil) Liédson	Sporting CP	25
2005–06	Porto (21)	79	Sporting CP	72	Benfica	67	18	34	(Cameroon) Albert Meyong	Belenenses	17
2006–07	Porto (22)	69	Sporting CP	68	Benfica	67	16	30	(Brazil) Liédson	Sporting CP	15
2007–08	Porto (23)	75^{(1)}	Sporting CP	55	Vitória de Guimarães	53	16	30	(Argentina) Lisandro López	Porto	24
2008–09	Porto (24)	70	Sporting CP	66	Benfica	59	16	30	(Brazil) Nenê	Nacional	20
2009–10	Benfica (32)	76	Braga	71	Porto	68	16	30	(Paraguay) Óscar Cardozo	Benfica	26
2010–11	Porto (25)	84	Benfica	63	Sporting CP	48	16	30	(Brazil) Hulk	Porto	23
2011–12	Porto (26)	75	Benfica	69	Braga	62	16	30	(Paraguay) Óscar Cardozo / (Brazil) Lima	Benfica / Braga	20
2012–13	Porto (27)	78	Benfica	77	Paços de Ferreira	54	16	30	(Colombia) Jackson Martínez	Porto	26
2013–14	Benfica (33)	74	Sporting CP	67	Porto	61	16	30	(Colombia) Jackson Martínez	Porto	20
2014–15	Benfica (34)	85	Porto	82	Sporting CP	76	18	34	(Colombia) Jackson Martínez	Porto	21
2015–16	Benfica (35)	88	Sporting CP	86	Porto	73	18	34	(Brazil) Jonas	Benfica	32
2016–17	Benfica (36)	82	Porto	76	Sporting CP	70	18	34	(Netherlands) Bas Dost	Sporting CP	34
2017–18	Porto (28)	88	Benfica	81	Sporting CP	78	18	34	(Brazil) Jonas	Benfica	34
2018–19	Benfica (37)	87	Porto	85	Sporting CP	74	18	34	(Switzerland) Haris Seferovic	Benfica	23
2019–20	Porto (29)	82	Benfica	77	Braga	60	18	34	(Brazil) Carlos Vinícius	Benfica	18
2020–21	Sporting CP (19)	85	Porto	80	Benfica	76	18	34	(Portugal) Pedro Gonçalves	Sporting CP	23
2021–22	Porto (30)	91	Sporting CP	85	Benfica	74	18	34	(Uruguay) Darwin Núñez	Benfica	26
2022–23	Benfica (38)	87	Porto	85	Braga	78	18	34	(Iran) Mehdi Taremi	Porto	22
2023–24	Sporting CP (20)	90	Benfica	80	Porto	72	18	34	(Sweden) Viktor Gyökeres	Sporting CP	29
2024–25	Sporting CP (21)	82	Benfica	80	Porto	71	18	34	(Sweden) Viktor Gyökeres	Sporting CP	39
2025–26	Porto (31)	88	Sporting CP	82	Benfica	80	18	34	(Colombia) Luis Suárez	Sporting CP	28

- Before 1995–96, the points were awarded in a format of two points for a win. In that season, Primeira Liga switched to the now standard three points for a win system.
- (1) Porto saw six points subtracted for corruption allegations in the Apito Dourado, but they recovered those points in July 2017.

== Performance by club ==
All Primeira Liga champions have come from either Lisbon or Porto.

Club	Winners	Runners-up	Winning seasons	Runners-up seasons
Benfica	38	31	1935–36, 1936–37, 1937–38, 1941–42, 1942–43, 1944–45, 1949–50, 1954–55, 1956–57, 1959–60, 1960–61, 1962–63, 1963–64, 1964–65, 1966–67, 1967–68, 1968–69, 1970–71, 1971–72, 1972–73, 1974–75, 1975–76, 1976–77, 1980–81, 1982–83, 1983–84, 1986–87, 1988–89, 1990–91, 1993–94, 2004–05, 2009–10, 2013–14, 2014–15, 2015–16, 2016–17, 2018–19, 2022–23	1943–44, 1945–46, 1946–47, 1947–48, 1948–49, 1951–52, 1952–53, 1955–56, 1958–59, 1965–66, 1969–70, 1973–74, 1977–78, 1978–79, 1981–82, 1985–86, 1987–88, 1989–90, 1991–92, 1992–93, 1995–96, 1997–98, 2002–03, 2003–04, 2010–11, 2011–12, 2012–13, 2017–18, 2019–20, 2023–24, 2024–25
Porto	31	29	1934–35, 1938–39, 1939–40, 1955–56, 1958–59, 1977–78, 1978–79, 1984–85, 1985–86, 1987–88, 1989–90, 1991–92, 1992–93, 1994–95, 1995–96, 1996–97, 1997–98, 1998–99, 2002–03, 2003–04, 2005–06, 2006–07, 2007–08, 2008–09, 2010–11, 2011–12, 2012–13, 2017–18, 2019–20, 2021–22, 2025–26	1935–36, 1937–38, 1940–41, 1950–51, 1953–54, 1956–57, 1957–58, 1961–62, 1962–63, 1963–64, 1964–65, 1968–69, 1974–75, 1979–80, 1980–81, 1982–83, 1983–84, 1986–87, 1988–89, 1990–91, 1993–94, 1999–2000, 2000–01, 2004–05, 2014–15, 2016–17, 2018–19, 2020–21, 2022–23
Sporting CP	21	22	1940–41, 1943–44, 1946–47, 1947–48, 1948–49, 1950–51, 1951–52, 1952–53, 1953–54, 1957–58, 1961–62, 1965–66, 1969–70, 1973–74, 1979–80, 1981–82, 1999–2000, 2001–02, 2020–21, 2023–24, 2024–25	1934–35, 1938–39, 1939–40, 1941–42, 1942–43, 1949–50, 1959–60, 1960–61, 1967–68, 1970–71, 1976–77, 1984–85, 1994–95, 1996–97, 2005–06, 2006–07, 2007–08, 2008–09, 2013–14, 2015–16, 2021–22, 2025–26
Belenenses	1	4	1945–46	1936–37, 1944–45, 1954–55, 1972–73
Boavista	1	3	2000–01	1975–76, 1998–99, 2001–02
Braga	0	1	—	2009–10
Vitória de Setúbal	0	1	—	1971–72
Académica	0	1	—	1966–67

== All-time Primeira Liga table ==
The all-time Primeira Liga table is an overall record of all match results, points, and goals of every team that has played in Primeira Liga since its inception in 1934. The table is accurate as of the end of the 2025–26 season. For comparison, older seasons have been calculated according to the three-points-per-win rule.

Pos	Team	S	Pts	GP	W	D	L	GF	GA	GD	1st	2nd	3rd	4th	5th	6th	T	Debut	Since/ Last App	Best	Notes
1	Benfica	92	5923	2636	1811	490	334	6346	2294	4042	38	31	18	4	–	1	92	1934–35	1934–35	1	^{[A]}
2	Porto	92	5801	2636	1777	470	395	5821	2297	3524	31	29	14	12	3	1	90	1934–35	1934–35	1	^{[A]}
3	Sporting CP	92	5509	2636	1656	541	439	5776	2475	3301	21	22	30	14	4	–	91	1934–35	1934–35	1	^{[A]}
4	Vitória de Guimarães	81	3422	2426	949	575	902	3395	3384	11	–	–	4	10	12	17	43	1941–42	2007–08	3	
5	Belenenses	77	3158	2146	877	527	742	3352	2745	607	1	4	14	8	9	7	43	1934–35	2017–18	1	
6	Braga	70	3128	2160	874	506	780	3027	2914	113	–	1	3	19	6	2	31	1947–48	1975–76	2	
7	Boavista	62	2606	1908	706	488	714	2448	2657	-209	1	3	2	10	4	5	25	1935–36	2024–25	1	^{[B]}
8	Vitória de Setúbal	72	2590	2072	694	508	870	2794	3119	-325	–	1	3	2	9	7	22	1934–35	2019–20	2	
9	Académica	64	1935	1704	516	387	801	2346	3003	-657	–	1	–	2	6	8	17	1934–35	2015–16	2	
10	Marítimo	43	1760	1414	472	383	559	1573	1805	-232	–	–	–	–	6	5	11	1977–78	2026–27	5	
11	Rio Ave	31	1202	1010	301	299	410	1063	1346	-283	–	–	–	–	3	2	5	1979–80	2022–23	5	
12	Estoril	31	1105	942	289	237	416	1264	1491	-227	–	–	–	2	3	1	6	1944–45	2021–22	4	
13	Gil Vicente	25	952	842	244	220	378	875	1144	-269	–	–	–	–	2	1	3	1990–91	2019–20	5	
14	Farense	26	952	856	245	217	394	898	1238	-340	–	–	–	–	1	2	3	1970–71	2024–25	5	
15	Paços de Ferreira	24	923	784	234	221	329	839	1106	-267	–	–	1	–	1	2	4	1990–91	2022–23	3	
16	Beira-Mar	27	896	858	218	242	398	883	1340	-457	–	–	–	–	–	1	1	1961–62	2012–13	6	
17	Nacional	22	870	724	228	186	310	842	1012	-170	–	–	–	2	2	1	5	1988–89	2024–25	4	
18	Portimonense	21	776	678	205	162	313	715	946	-231	–	–	–	–	1	1	2	1976–77	2023–24	5	
19	Salgueiros	24	774	740	197	183	360	804	1377	-573	–	–	–	–	1	1	2	1943–44	2001–02	5	
20	CUF Barreiro	23	769	610	207	148	255	828	1003	-175	–	–	1	2	1	2	6	1942–43	1975–76	3	^{[C]}
21	Leixões	25	713	670	183	164	323	750	1186	-436	–	–	–	–	1	1	2	1936–37	2009–10	5	
22	União de Leiria	18	711	584	184	159	241	620	771	-151	–	–	–	–	2	2	4	1979–80	2011–12	5	
23	Atlético CP	24	710	632	192	134	306	976	1285	-309	–	–	2	1	1	3	7	1943–44	1976–77	3	
24	Chaves	18	702	616	177	171	268	674	885	-211	–	–	–	–	2	2	4	1985–86	2023–24	5	
25	Estrela da Amadora	19	700	642	164	208	270	616	839	-223	–	–	–	–	–	–	–	1988–89	2023–24	7	
26	Varzim	21	683	618	169	176	273	638	913	-275	–	–	–	–	1	1	2	1963–64	2002–03	5	
27	Barreirense	24	617	592	166	119	307	758	1195	-437	–	–	–	1	2	4	7	1937–38	1978–79	4	
28	Moreirense	15	592	506	150	142	214	534	693	-159	–	–	–	–	–	2	2	2002–03	2023–24	6	
29	Olhanense	20	565	516	147	124	245	800	1057	-257	–	–	–	1	2	1	4	1941–42	2013–14	4	
30	Famalicão	13	529	374	136	121	177	505	652	-147	–	–	–	–	1	1	2	1946–47	2019–20	5	
31	Sporting da Covilhã	15	457	406	126	79	201	585	834	-249	–	–	–	–	1	3	4	1947–48	1987–88	5	
32	Penafiel	13	435	434	106	117	211	351	625	-274	–	–	–	–	–	–	–	1980–81	2014–15	10	
33	Lusitano de Évora	14	412	364	116	64	184	494	722	-228	–	–	–	–	1	1	2	1952–53	1965–66	5	
35	Santa Clara	10	389	340	99	92	139	361	457	-96	–	–	–	–	1	1	2	1999–2000	2024–25	5	
34	Sporting de Espinho	11	379	354	96	91	167	336	523	-187	–	–	–	–	–	–	–	1974–75	1996–97	7	
36	Arouca	9	356	302	93	77	132	336	441	-105	–	–	–	–	2	–	2	2013–14	2021–22	5	
37	Tirsense	8	268	256	65	73	118	219	370	-151	–	–	–	–	–	–	–	1967–68	1995–96	8	
38	Tondela	8	263	272	67	62	143	278	433	-155	–	–	–	–	–	–	–	2015–16	2025–26	10	
39	Alverca	6	220	204	58	46	100	227	318	-91	–	–	–	–	–	–	–	1998–99	2025–26	11	
40	União da Madeira	6	206	208	48	62	98	177	300	-123	–	–	–	–	–	–	–	1989–90	2015–16	10	^{[D]}
41	Naval 1º de Maio	6	193	184	49	46	89	160	255	-95	–	–	–	–	–	–	–	2005–06	2010–11	8	^{[E]}
42	Oriental	7	187	190	50	37	103	224	438	-214	–	–	–	–	1	–	1	1950–51	1974–75	5	
43	Campomaiorense	5	178	170	48	34	88	186	287	-101	–	–	–	–	–	–	–	1995–96	2000–01	11	^{[F]}
44	Feirense	7	175	222	44	43	135	187	403	-216	–	–	–	–	–	–	–	1962–63	2018–19	8	
45	Torreense	6	163	164	44	31	89	183	316	-133	–	–	–	–	–	–	–	1955–56	1991–92	7	
46	União de Tomar	6	162	172	43	33	96	178	331	-153	–	–	–	–	–	–	–	1968–69	1975–76	10	
47	Desportivo das Aves	6	160	196	40	40	116	173	320	-147	–	–	–	–	–	–	–	1985–86	2019–20	13	^{[G]}
48	Casa Pia	5	157	150	40	37	73	151	247	-96	–	–	–	–	–	–	–	1938–39	2022–23	8	
49	O Elvas	5	148	146	37	37	72	211	283	-72	–	–	–	–	–	–	–	1947–48	1987–88	8	
50	B-SAD	4	144	136	33	45	58	117	195	-78	–	–	–	–	–	–	–	2018–19	2021–22	9	^{[H]}
51	Leça	4	124	124	33	25	66	120	231	-111	–	–	–	–	–	–	–	1941–42	1997–98	12	
52	Vizela	4	118	132	27	37	68	138	243	-95	–	–	–	–	–	–	–	1984–85	2023–24	11	
53	Académico de Viseu	4	105	128	27	24	77	81	237	-156	–	–	–	–	–	–	–	1978–79	2026–27	13	
54	Caldas	4	103	104	26	25	53	124	235	-111	–	–	–	–	–	–	–	1955–56	1958–59	10	
55	Montijo	3	89	90	23	20	47	91	155	-64	–	–	–	–	–	–	–	1972–73	1976–77	13	^{[I]}
56	Amora	3	89	90	22	23	45	90	143	-53	–	–	–	–	–	–	–	1980–81	1982–83	12	
57	Lusitano VRSA	3	72	78	21	9	48	94	210	-116	–	–	–	–	–	–	–	1947–48	1949–50	12	
58	Sanjoanense	4	70	104	16	22	66	86	249	-163	–	–	–	–	–	–	–	1946–47	1968–69	10	
59	Carcavelinhos	5	69	82	19	12	51	103	223	-120	–	–	–	1	–	1	2	1935–36	1941–42	4	^{[J]}
60	Unidos de Lisboa	3	62	54	18	8	28	151	145	6	–	–	–	1	–	–	1	1940–41	1942–43	4	^{[K]}
61	Académico do Porto	5	60	82	18	6	58	137	300	-163	–	–	–	–	–	–	–	1934–35	1941–42	7	^{[L]}
62	SL Elvas	2	54	48	17	3	28	108	167	-59	–	–	–	–	–	–	–	1945–46	1946–47	9	^{[M]}
63	AVS Futebol SAD	2	48	68	8	24	36	52	127	-75	–	–	–	–	–	–	–	2024–25	2025–26	16	
64	Fafe	1	41	38	9	14	15	29	47	-18	–	–	–	–	–	–	–	1988–89	1988–89	16	
65	Felgueiras	1	33	34	8	9	17	29	47	-18	–	–	–	–	–	–	–	1995–96	1995–96	16	^{[N]}
66	Seixal	2	29	52	7	8	37	44	150	-106	–	–	–	–	–	–	–	1963–64	1964–65	12	
67	Riopele	1	27	30	6	9	15	23	51	-28	–	–	–	–	–	–	–	1977–78	1977–78	15	^{[O]}
68	Águeda	1	26	30	7	5	18	25	55	-30	–	–	–	–	–	–	–	1983–84	1983–84	15	
69	Trofense	1	23	30	5	8	17	25	42	-17	–	–	–	–	–	–	–	2008–09	2008–09	16	
70	União de Coimbra	1	22	30	5	7	18	22	54	-32	–	–	–	–	–	–	–	1972–73	1972–73	15	
71	Ginásio de Alcobaça	1	19	30	4	7	19	20	56	-36	–	–	–	–	–	–	–	1982–83	1982–83	16	
72	União de Lisboa	1	11	14	3	2	9	30	49	-19	–	–	–	–	–	1	1	1934–35	1934–35	6	^{[J]}
73	Oliveirense	1	11	22	3	2	17	22	73	-51	–	–	–	–	–	–	–	1945–46	1945–46	12	

A. Never relegated.
B. Club ended football team in 2026.
C. Renamed Fabril in 2000.
D. Club folded in 2021. Successor club União da Bola was founded in 2022.
E. Club folded in 2017. Successor club Naval 1893 was founded in 2017.
F. Club ended football team in 2013.
G. Club ended football team in 2020. Successor club AVS was founded in 2023.
H. Merged with Portalegrense in 2024.
I. Club folded in 2007. Successor club Olímpico Montijo was founded in 2007.
J. Merged to form Atlético CP in 1942.
K. Club ended football team in 2009.
L. Club ended football team in 1964.
M. Merged to form O Elvas in 1947.
N. Club folded in 2005. Successor club Felgueiras (2006) was founded in 2006.
O. Club folded in 1984.

Last updated: 16 July 2026

Primeira Liga
Liga Portugal 2
Liga 3
Campeonato de Portugal
Portuguese District Championships
Clubs no longer in competition

== Records ==
=== Team records ===
- In 1972–73, Benfica became the first team to win the Portuguese league without defeat, with 58 points in 30 games (28 wins and 2 draws), the best efficiency ever obtained (96.7%) where 2 points were awarded for a victory. In that season, Benfica set the Portuguese league and European leagues record for most consecutive victories (23) – 29 wins overall, between 1971–72 and 1972–73. Benfica also set the league record for the greatest margin of victory in points over the second-placed team (18 points) in a 2 points per win championship.
- In 1977–78, Benfica completed the Portuguese league unbeaten for the second time (21 wins and 9 draws), despite not having won the league in this season.
- In 1990–91, Benfica achieved the highest number of wins in a single season – 32 (out of 38 matches).
- In 1998–99, Porto became the only team to win five consecutive titles.
- In 2010–11, Porto won the Portuguese league without defeat, with 84 points in 30 games (27 wins and 3 draws), the best efficiency ever obtained (93.3%) where 3 points were awarded for a victory. That season, Porto also set the league record for the greatest margin of victory in points over the second-placed team (21 points) in a 3 points per win championship.
- In 2012–13, Porto won the Portuguese league unbeaten for the second time (24 wins and 6 draws).
- From 8 November 2020 to 21 April 2022, Porto set the record for the longest unbeaten run in the league: 58 matches (47 wins and 11 draws).
- In 2021–22, Porto achieved a record 91 points in the Portuguese league (29 wins and 4 draws in 34 games).
- In 2025–26, Benfica finished the league without defeat for a third time (23 wins and 11 draws), becoming the first team to do so in an edition with 34 matches and setting the record for the longest unbeaten run in a single season.

=== Individual records ===
==== Appearances ====
As of 20 February 2021

Rank	Player	Appearances
1	(Portugal) Manuel Fernandes	486
2	(Portugal) António Sousa	484
3	(Portugal) João Vieira Pinto	476
4	(Portugal) Dinis Vital	442
5	(Portugal) António Veloso	437
6	(Portugal) Nené	422
6	(Portugal) Manuel Bento	422
8	(Portugal) Vítor Damas	416
9	(Portugal) João Pinto	408
10	(Portugal) Vítor Baía	406

==== Top scorers ====
As of 20 February 2021

Rank	Player	Goals
1	(Portugal) Fernando Peyroteo	332
2	(Portugal) Eusébio	320
3	(Portugal) Fernando Gomes	319
4	(Portugal) José Águas	291
5	(Portugal) Nené	262
6	(Portugal) Manuel Fernandes	243
7	(Portugal) Matateu	219
8	(Portugal) José Torres	218
9	(Portugal) Arsénio Duarte	215
10	(Portugal) Rui Jordão	213

==== Player transfer fees ====
Top transfer fees paid by Primeira Liga clubs
Rank	Player	Fee (min.)	Date	Transfer		Reference(s)
1	(Spain) Samu Aghehowa	€32M (Note: Porto paid an initial €15 million for 50% of economic rights. In May 2025, Porto acquired another 15% for €5 million. In July 2025, the remaining 35% were acquired for €12 million.)	23 August 2024	(Spain) Atlético Madrid	Porto	
2	(Colombia) Richard Ríos	€27M	22 July 2025	(Brazil) Palmeiras	Benfica	
3	(Turkey) Orkun Kökçü	€25M (Note: plus €5 million in bonuses)	10 June 2023	(Netherlands) Feyenoord	Benfica	
4	(Uruguay) Darwin Núñez	€24M	4 September 2020	(Spain) Almería	Benfica	
5	(Croatia) Franjo Ivanović	€22.8M (Note: plus €5 million in bonuses)	31 July 2025	(Belgium) Union Saint-Gilloise	Benfica	
6	(Colombia) Luis Suárez	€22.2M (Note: plus €5.3 million in bonuses)	28 July 2025	(Spain) Almería	Sporting CP	
7	(Greece) Fotis Ioannidis	€22M (Note: plus €3 million in bonuses)	1 September 2025	(Greece) Panathinaikos	Sporting CP	
8	(Mexico) Raúl Jiménez	€21.8M	21 July 2016	(Spain) Atlético Madrid	Benfica	
9	(Democratic Republic of the Congo) Giannelli Imbula	€20M	1 July 2015	(France) Marseille	Porto	
9	(Spain) Óliver Torres	€20M	9 February 2017	(Spain) Atlético Madrid	Porto	
9	(Spain) Raúl de Tomás	€20M	3 July 2019	(Spain) Real Madrid	Benfica	
9	(Germany) Julian Weigl	€20M	2 January 2020	(Germany) Borussia Dortmund	Benfica	
9	(Brazil) Everton Soares	€20M	14 August 2020	(Brazil) Grêmio	Benfica	
9	(Portugal) David Carmo	€20M (Note: plus €2.5 million in bonuses)	5 July 2022	(Portugal) Braga	Porto	
9	(Sweden) Viktor Gyökeres	€20M (Note: plus €4 million in bonuses)	1 July 2023	(England) Coventry City	Sporting CP	
9	(Brazil) Arthur Cabral	€20M (Note: plus €5 million in bonuses)	10 August 2023	(Italy) Fiorentina	Benfica	
9	(Denmark) Victor Froholdt	€20M (Note: plus €2 million in bonuses)	23 July 2025	(Denmark) Copenhagen	Porto	
9	(Belgium) Dodi Lukébakio	€20M (Note: plus €4 million in bonuses)	1 September 2025	(Spain) Sevilla	Benfica	

Top transfer fees received by Primeira Liga clubs
Rank	Player	Fee (min.)	Date	Transfer		Reference(s)
1	(Portugal) João Félix	€126M	3 July 2019	Benfica	(Spain) Atlético Madrid	
2	(Argentina) Enzo Fernández	€121M	31 January 2023	Benfica	(England) Chelsea	
3	(Uruguay) Darwin Nuñez	€75M (Note: plus €25 million in bonuses)	13 June 2022	Benfica	(England) Liverpool	
4	(Portugal) Rúben Dias	€68M	29 September 2020	Benfica	(England) Manchester City	
5	(Portugal) Gonçalo Ramos	€65M	22 November 2023	Benfica	(France) Paris Saint-Germain	
6	(Sweden) Viktor Gyökeres	€63.5M (Note: plus €10 million in bonuses)	26 July 2025	Sporting CP	(England) Arsenal	
7	(Uruguay) Manuel Ugarte	€60M	7 July 2023	Sporting CP	(France) Paris Saint-Germain	
7	(Portugal) Otávio	€60M	22 August 2023	Porto	(Saudi Arabia) Al-Nassr	
7	(Spain) Nico González	€60M	3 February 2025	Porto	(England) Manchester City	
10	(Portugal) João Neves	€59.9M (Note: plus €10 million in bonuses)	5 August 2024	Benfica	(France) Paris Saint-Germain	

== Media coverage ==
=== Portugal ===
- TVI (Moreirense home matches)
- BTV (SL Benfica home matches)
- Sport TV (every match, excluding Moreirense and Benfica home matches)

== See also ==
- LPFP Primeira Liga Player of the Year
- Portuguese Golden Ball
- SJPF Player of the Month
- SJPF Young Player of the Month
- CNID Footballer of the Year
- Bola de Prata
- Campeonato Nacional Feminino
- List of sports attendance figures
- List of association football competitions in Portugal
- List of foreign Primeira Liga players

== Sources ==
- Tovar, Rui (2011). Almanaque do FC Porto 1893–2011 (in Portuguese). Alfragide: Caderno. ISBN 9789892315430.
