= 1947–48 Primeira Divisão =

14th season of top-tier Portuguese football

Primeira Liga
- Season: 1947–48
- Champions: Sporting CP; 4th title
- Relegated: Associação Académica de Coimbra - O.A.F.
- Matches played: 182
- Goals scored: 832 (4.57 per match)

Statistics of Portuguese Liga in the 1947–48 season.

== Overview ==
Location of teams in the 1947–48 Liga

It was contested by 14 teams, and Sporting Clube de Portugal won the championship.

== League standings ==
Pos	Team	Pld	W	D	L	GF	GA	GD	Pts	Qualification or relegation
1	Sporting CP (C)	26	20	1	5	92	40	+52	41	
2	Benfica	26	19	3	4	84	35	+49	41	
3	Belenenses	26	16	5	5	76	30	+46	37	
4	Estoril	26	16	4	6	91	49	+42	36	
5	Porto	26	17	2	7	73	42	+31	36	
6	Atlético CP	26	11	3	12	56	61	−5	25	
7	Vitória de Guimarães	26	10	4	12	44	56	−12	24	
8	O Elvas	26	11	2	13	66	63	+3	24	
9	Boavista	26	9	2	15	40	65	−25	20	
10	Vitória de Setúbal	26	8	3	15	38	64	−26	19	
11	Olhanense	26	5	7	14	48	66	−18	17	
12	Lusitano VRSA	26	7	3	16	29	78	−49	17	
13	Braga	26	6	4	16	47	69	−22	16	
14	Académica (R)	26	4	2	20	35	113	−78	10	Relegation to Segunda Divisão

Source: rsssf.com
(C) Champions; (R) Relegated

== Results ==
Home \ Away	ACA	ACP	BEL	BEN	BOA	BRA	EST	LUS	ELV	OLH	POR	SCP	VGU	VSE
Académica		1–2	0–4	2–6	1–0	4–3	1–5	2–1	2–1	3–3	0–1	3–6	2–2	1–4
Atlético CP	6–0		1–1	2–4	3–1	4–3	2–2	3–1	5–2	10–4	3–5	1–4	2–1	3–0
Belenenses	7–1	0–0		4–1	7–0	4–0	2–3	5–0	1–1	4–0	3–0	3–2	3–0	7–1
Benfica	5–0	5–2	2–0		3–1	6–1	2–3	6–1	1–2	2–0	4–1	1–4	3–0	3–0
Boavista	6–2	5–2	2–3	0–1		4–0	1–4	2–1	2–0	2–0	0–3	2–1	2–2	3–1
Braga	2–1	1–3	2–3	1–1	3–3		5–2	7–1	4–1	0–0	0–3	1–3	1–0	3–1
Estoril	7–0	5–4	5–2	0–2	4–0	6–1		6–1	8–2	3–1	4–1	1–2	6–2	4–2
Lusitano VRSA	5–1	1–0	2–1	2–7	2–0	2–1	1–1		2–1	0–0	0–1	1–4	0–1	2–1
O Elvas	12–1	5–3	2–1	3–6	5–0	3–1	4–1	7–0		3–1	2–4	1–2	3–0	2–1
Olhanense	5–2	1–2	1–1	3–3	5–0	5–2	1–4	1–1	2–2		1–4	1–2	5–0	1–0
Porto	7–1	1–1	0–2	0–2	5–1	2–1	2–2	3–0	4–0	7–3		4–1	3–1	5–2
Sporting CP	6–1	2–1	4–4	1–3	5–0	3–2	3–1	12–0	2–1	3–2	5–2		3–2	8–1
Vitória de Guimarães	3–2	4–2	0–1	2–2	2–1	3–1	2–1	3–2	7–1	3–1	0–3	0–4		3–1
Vitória de Setúbal	4–1	3–2	0–3	0–3	0–2	1–1	3–3	2–0	2–0	3–1	3–2	1–0	1–1	

Legend: Blue = home team win; Yellow = draw; Red = away team win.
