= FC Porto–Sporting CP rivalry =

Portuguese football club rivalry

- Location: Portugal
- Teams: Porto; Sporting CP
- First meeting: 4 June 1922; Campeonato de Portugal; Porto 2–1 Sporting CP
- Latest meeting: 22 April 2026; Taça de Portugal; Porto 0–0 Sporting
- Stadiums: Estádio José Alvalade; Estádio do Dragão

Statistics
- Total meetings: 257
- Most wins: Porto (94)
- All-time series: Porto: 94; Drawn: 76; Sporting: 87
- Largest victory: Porto 10–1 Sporting CP; Campeonato de Portugal (22 March 1936)

The FC Porto–Sporting CP rivalry is considered one of the most important rivalries in Portuguese football. Porto and Sporting are based in the cities of Porto and Lisbon, respectively, and both compete in the Primeira Liga, the top tier of the Portuguese football league system.

In 1922, the first Campeonato de Portugal, the forerunner to today's Taça de Portugal, was decided in a best-of-three series between Porto and Sporting, ultimately won by Porto (the Algarve and Madeira FA winners were also scheduled to participate but could not attend the tournament due to logistical issues). Thereafter, there have been five other finals between the two teams, this time after more participants had been eliminated. The clubs have also met in the Primeira Liga continuously since 1934 and in other cup fixtures.

== All-time head-to-head results ==
As of 22 April 2026

Competition	Matches	Porto wins	Draws	Sporting CP wins	Porto goals	Sporting CP goals
Portuguese League	184	71	52	61	256	260
Portuguese Cup	45	17	14	14	61	56
Portuguese League Cup	7	1	3	3	5	8
Portuguese Super Cup	9	1	4	4	7	13
Championship of Portugal	12	4	3	5	14	21
Total	257	94	76	87	343	358

=== Honours comparison ===
These are the major football honours of Porto and Sporting as of 1 August 2026.

National	Porto	Sporting
Championship of Portugal	4	4
Portuguese League	31	21
Portuguese Cup	20	18
Portuguese League Cup	1	4
Portuguese Super Cup	25	9
Total	81	56
International	Porto	Sporting
European Cup / UEFA Champions League	2	—
UEFA Cup / UEFA Europa League	2	—
European / UEFA Super Cup	1	—
Intercontinental Cup	2	—
UEFA Cup Winners' Cup	—	1
Total	7	1
Grand Total	88	57

== League matches ==
The matches listed below are only Primeira Liga matches, club name in bold indicates win. The score is given at full-time, and in the goals columns, the goalscorer and time when goal was scored is noted.

Team won the competition that season

#	Season	R.	Home team	Away team	Score	Goals (home)	Goals (away)
1	1934–35	7	**Porto**	Sporting	4–2	Pinga (10, 36, 65), A. Carneiro (11)	M. Soeiro (31), V. Nunes (34)
2	1934–35	14	Sporting	Porto	2–2	Ferdinando (25), M. Soeiro (85)	C. Nunes (40), A. Carneiro (46)
3	1935–36	1	**Sporting**	Porto	3–2	M. Soeiro (8, 22), A. Mourão (35)	C. Mesquita (30), Pinga (40)
4	1935–36	8	**Porto**	Sporting	10–1	Pinga (10, 25, 90), C. Nunes (13, 60, 70, 85), V. Mota (30), A. Santos (43), C. Pereira (44)	W. Possak (15)
5	1936–37	3	Porto	Sporting	2–2	A. Santos (6), Pinga (65)	M. Soeiro (43, 56)
6	1936–37	10	**Sporting**	Porto	9–1	João Cruz (33, 43, 60), M. Soeiro (40, 64, 86, 89), P. Pireza (47, 57)	Pinga (48)
7	1937–38	3	**Porto**	Sporting	2–1	A. Santos (33), Pinga (40)	H. Nogueira (77)
8	1937–38	10	**Sporting**	Porto	6–1	F. Peyroteo (30, 57, 87), João Cruz (31, 80), A. Mourão (84)	Â. Silva (81)
9	1938–39	1	**Porto**	Sporting	2–1	C. Nunes (30), Costuras (54)	M. Soeiro (77)
10	1938–39	8	Sporting	Porto	4–4	Peyroteo (8, 59), A. Paciência (47), Sacadura (87 o.g.)	Costuras (17, 44), A. Santos (20), C. Nunes (34)
11	1939–40	5	**Porto**	Sporting	4–2	S. Kodrnja (31, 44, 75), F. Petrak (57)	A. Ferreira (46), F. Peyroteo (76)
12	1939–40	14	**Sporting**	Porto	4–3	João Cruz (39), M. Galvão (61, 72 p.), A. Mourão (70)	F. Petrak (51, 88), S. Kodrnja (65)
13	1940–41	1	**Sporting**	Porto	5–1	A. Ferreira (18), F. Peyroteo (33, 56), João Cruz (65), P. Pireza (84)	Pinga (46)
14	1940–41	8	Porto	Sporting	2–2	C. Nunes (18), Pinga (87)	João Cruz (52, 86)
15	1941–42	1	**Sporting**	Porto	5–0	João Cruz (3, 5, 20 p.), F. Peyroteo (50), A. Ferreira (80)	
16	1941–42	12	**Porto**	Sporting	3–0	M. Correia Dias (3, 19), C. Nunes (27)	
17	1942–43	2	Porto	Sporting	2–2	M. Correia Dias (22, 82)	F. Peyroteo (8), João Cruz (55)
18	1942–43	11	**Sporting**	Porto	5–2	D. Silva (24, 50), A. Mourão (44), João Cruz (65), F. Peyroteo (81)	A. Araújo (23), M. Correia Dias (36)
19	1943–44	7	**Sporting**	Porto	2–0	F. Peyroteo (40), A. Mourão (88)	
20	1943–44	16	Porto	**Sporting**	1–3	A. Araújo (55 p.)	A. Marques (23), F. Peyroteo (50), Albano (77)
21	1944–45	2	**Porto**	Sporting	3–1	Lourenço (42), Catolino (50), A. Araújo (56)	F. Peyroteo (16)
22	1944–45	11	**Sporting**	Porto	5–4	J. Correia (18), C. Canário (28), A. Marques (62), F. Peyroteo (67), O. Barrosa (87)	Lourenço (22, 43), Catolino (63), F. Gomes da Costa (83)
23	1945–46	8	Porto	**Sporting**	2–3	A. Araújo (10), J. Machado (55)	F. Peyroteo (28, 36), A. Ferreira (73)
24	1945–46	19	**Sporting**	Porto	1–0	Veríssimo (23)	
25	1946–47	4	**Sporting**	Porto	3–2	J. Correia (6, 55), F. Peyroteo (87)	A. Araújo (53), Sanfins (62)
26	1946–47	17	Porto	**Sporting**	2–4	Diógenes (6, 77)	Albano (59), J. Correia (75, 85), F. Peyroteo (79)
27	1947–48	12	**Porto**	Sporting	4–1	M. Correia Dias (40, 56, 67), Sanfins (41)	J. Correia (5)
28	1947–48	25	**Sporting**	Porto	5–2	Peyroteo (1), J. Travassos (14), Albano (21 p.), M. Vasques (30, 46)	Lourenço (2), A. Araújo (25)
29	1948–49	12	**Porto**	Sporting	1–0	Sanfins (1)	
30	1948–49	25	Sporting	**Porto**	1–2	J. Correia (40)	Gastão (27), J. Machado (52)
31	1949–50	5	**Porto**	Sporting	2–1	José Maria (53), A. Monteiro da Costa (75)	M. Wilson (22)
32	1949–50	18	**Sporting**	Porto	4–1	Mário Wilson (43, 78), Albano (84), M. Vasques (88)	A. Monteiro da Costa (90)
33	1950–51	5	**Sporting**	Porto	2–1	M. Vasques (7), J. Correia (48)	A. Monteiro da Costa (89)
34	1950–51	18	**Porto**	Sporting	3–0	Nelo (22, 56), José Maria (52)	
35	1951–52	6	Porto	Sporting	2–2	José Maria (4, 11)	Albano (40), A. Pais (90 o.g.)
36	1951–52	19	**Sporting**	Porto	2–1	J. Correia (42, 84)	Vital (5)
37	1952–53	4	Porto	Sporting	1–1	Eleutério (90)	Rola (89)
38	1952–53	17	**Sporting**	Porto	5–1	J. Martins (22, 36, 41, 76), Albano (88 p.)	J. Costa (27)
39	1953–54	2	**Porto**	Sporting	1–0	Hernâni (31)	
40	1953–54	15	**Sporting**	Porto	2–1	J. Travassos (14), M. Vasques (30)	José Maria (21 p.)
41	1954–55	3	**Sporting**	Porto	5–1	Galileu (8), J. Martins (32), M. Vasques (60, 65, 82)	A. Teixeira (67)
42	1954–55	16	Porto	Sporting	1–1	C. Vieira (57)	M. Vasques (32)
43	1955–56	12	**Porto**	Sporting	3–1	C. Duarte (55), Jaburú (62), Hernâni (72)	M. Vasques (79)
44	1955–56	25	**Sporting**	Porto	1–0	V. Castro (16)	
45	1956–57	5	**Porto**	Sporting	2–0	C. Duarte (5), Hernâni (33)	
46	1956–57	18	**Sporting**	Porto	2–1	M. Vasques (28), Miltinho (59)	C. Duarte (47)
47	1957–58	1	**Sporting**	Porto	3–0	J. Martins (55), M. Pompeu (83), J. Travassos (89)	
48	1957–58	14	**Porto**	Sporting	2–1	Hernâni (13, 71)	Vadinho (44)
49	1958–59	3	**Porto**	Sporting	1–0	Hernâni (90)	
50	1958–59	16	Sporting	Porto	2–2	H. Sarmento (15), D. Arizaga (80)	Gastão (24), Hernâni (61)
51	1959–60	3	Porto	**Sporting**	1–4	Perdigão (25)	D. Arizaga (12, 56), F. Puglia (43, 60)
52	1959–60	16	**Sporting**	Porto	6–1	Vadinho (17, 55, 57), F. Pinto (29, 46), J. Seminário (89)	Y. Daucik (67)
53	1960–61	5	Porto	Sporting	0–0		
54	1960–61	18	Sporting	Porto	1–1	J. Seminário (41)	Noé (23)
55	1961–62	2	Porto	**Sporting**	0–2		L. Soares (43), J. Morais (85)
56	1961–62	15	Sporting	**Porto**	0–1		A. Veríssimo (88)
57	1962–63	5	Porto	**Sporting**	1–3	A. Veríssimo (46)	J. Morais (43, 62), O. Silva (75)
58	1962–63	18	Sporting	**Porto**	0–1		S. Pereira (56)
59	1963–64	12	**Porto**	Sporting	2–1	Jaime (21), F. Nóbrega (70)	Mascarenhas 12)
60	1963–64	25	Sporting	Porto	0–0		
61	1964–65	3	Sporting	Porto	1–1	E. Figueiredo (77)	F. Nóbrega (89)
62	1964–65	16	Porto	**Sporting**	1–3	Carlos Manuel (87)	O. Silva (10), João Lourenço (50, 62)
63	1965–66	12	Porto	Sporting	1–1	Jaime (37)	J. Morais (67)
64	1965–66	25	**Sporting**	Porto	4–0	J. Oliveira Duarte (40), E. Figueiredo (48), João Lourenço (67, 72)	
65	1966–67	2	**Porto**	Sporting	1–0	C. Baptista (13)	
66	1966–67	15	Sporting	Porto	2–2	J. Morais (67, 76)	B. Velha (18), Djalma (48)
67	1967–68	7	Sporting	Porto	0–0		
68	1967–68	20	Porto	**Sporting**	0–1		V. Gonçalves (62)
69	1968–69	7	Porto	Sporting	1–1	C. Pinto (90)	João Lourenço (73)
70	1968–69	20	**Sporting**	Porto	2–1	Pedras (35), João Lourenço (87 p.)	B. Velha (80)
71	1969–70	5	**Sporting**	Porto	2–1	João Lourenço (15), Marinho (81)	C. Pinto (44)
72	1969–70	18	Porto	**Sporting**	0–1		João Lourenço (23)
73	1970–71	11	**Sporting**	Porto	2–1	Mosquera (2), F. Peres (20)	A. Lemos (30)
74	1970–71	24	**Porto**	Sporting	2–1	Joaquinzinho (41), A. Miglietti (75)	J. Dinis (82)
75	1971–72	9	Porto	Sporting	0–0		
76	1971–72	24	**Sporting**	Porto	2–1	Rolando (32 o.g.), C. Faria (64)	A. Miglietti (57)
77	1972–73	1	Porto	**Sporting**	0–1		H. Yazalde (17)
78	1972–73	16	Sporting	**Porto**	0–3		F. Minuano (11, 74), A. Miglietti (23)
79	1973–74	9	Porto	Sporting	1–1	Marco Aurélio (41)	C. Faria (77)
80	1973–74	24	**Sporting**	Porto	2–0	J. Dinis (5, 19)	
81	1974–75	3	Porto	Sporting	1–1	T. Cubillas (84)	H. Yazalde (50)
82	1974–75	18	**Sporting**	Porto	2–1	Nélson (42), H. Yazalde (78)	A. Oliveira (59)
83	1975–76	7	Porto	**Sporting**	2–3	A. Murça (18), F. Gomes (57)	C. Faria (9), M. Fernandes (15), Baltasar (74)
84	1975–76	22	**Sporting**	Porto	5–1	C. Faria (6, 28), S. Fraguito (49), M. Fernandes (61), Baltasar (83)	T. Cubillas (16)
85	1976–77	7	**Sporting**	Porto	3–0	S. Keïta (29), Manoel (37), M. Fernandes (87)	
86	1976–77	22	**Porto**	Sporting	4–1	A. Oliveira (21, 39, 70), Duda (34)	S. Fraguito (82)
87	1977–78	6	**Porto**	Sporting	3–0	O. Machado (18, 35), Duda (51)	
88	1977–78	21	Sporting	**Porto**	2–3	P. Meneses (33 p.), Manoel (57)	F. Gomes (18, 39), Duda (70)
89	1978–79	9	Sporting	Porto	0–0		
90	1978–79	24	Porto	Sporting	0–0		
91	1979–80	12	**Sporting**	Porto	1–0	R. Jordão (42)	
92	1979–80	27	Porto	Sporting	1–1	Romeu (49)	C. Freire (75)
93	1980–81	1	Sporting	**Porto**	1–2	Manoel (55)	A. Teixeira (27), Albertino (60)
94	1980–81	16	**Porto**	Sporting	1–0	M. Walsh (19)	
95	1981–82	15	**Sporting**	Porto	1–0	Mário Jorge (34)	
96	1981–82	30	**Porto**	Sporting	2–0		Jacques (30), Júlio Carlos (78)
97	1982–83	2	Porto	Sporting	0–0		
98	1982–83	17	Sporting	Porto	3–3	R. Jordão (12 p., 36, 66 p.)	M. Walsh (17, 39), F. Gomes (25 p.)
99	1983–84	7	**Porto**	Sporting	1–0	F. Gomes (72)	
100	1983–84	22	Sporting	**Porto**	0–1		F. Gomes (11)
101	1984–85	11	Porto	Sporting	0–0		
102	1984–85	26	Sporting	Porto	0–0		
103	1985–86	9	**Porto**	Sporting	2–1	A. André (16), A. Lima Pereira (48)	P. Venâncio (54)
104	1985–86	24	Sporting	**Porto**	0–1		Celso (40)
105	1986–87	9	**Porto**	Sporting	2–0	F. Gomes (11, 45)	
106	1986–87	24	**Sporting**	Porto	2–0	R. Meade (54), P. Houtman (66)	
107	1987–88	10	**Porto**	Sporting	2–0	R. Madjer (13), A. Sousa (57 p.)	
108	1987–88	29	**Sporting**	Porto	2–1	Paulinho Cascavel (46), Mário Jorge (74)	J. Plácido (75)
109	1988–89	19	Sporting	**Porto**	1–2	Paulinho Cascavel (51 p.)	Geraldão (40), J. Semedo (59)
110	1988–89	38	**Porto**	Sporting	3–0	R. Madjer (52, 82), R. Águas (81)	
111	1989–90	5	**Sporting**	Porto	1–0	A. André (81 o.g.)	
112	1989–90	22	**Porto**	Sporting	3–2	S. Demol (12 p., 50 p.), Branco (22)	M. Brandão (84), Luizinho (87)
113	1990–91	14	**Porto**	Sporting	2–0	Geraldão (5), J. Couto (70)	
114	1990–91	33	Sporting	**Porto**	0–2		J. Couto (44), E. Kostadinov (73)
115	1991–92	1	Porto	Sporting	0–0		
116	1991–92	18	Sporting	**Porto**	0–2		E. Kostadinov (30), F. Bandeirinha (48)
117	1992–93	10	Sporting	Porto	1–1	A. Juskowiak (8)	E. Kostadinov (43)
118	1992–93	27	Porto	Sporting	0–0		
119	1993–94	10	Sporting	**Porto**	0–1		Domingos (6)
120	1993–94	27	**Porto**	Sporting	2–0	L. Drulović (52), Vinha (86)	
121	1994–95	14	Porto	Sporting	1–1	José Carlos (5)	L. Figo (51)
122	1994–95	31	Sporting	**Porto**	0–1		Domingos (58 p.)
123	1995–96	1	**Porto**	Sporting	2–1	Domingos (67, 89)	A. Ouattara (24)
124	1995–96	18	Sporting	**Porto**	0–2		Domingos (60, 75)
125	1996–97	6	Sporting	**Porto**	0–1		Edmílson (26)
126	1996–97	23	Porto	**Sporting**	1–2	J. Barroso (71)	Beto (29), P. Barbosa (53)
127	1997–98	9	Porto	Sporting	1–1	Jardel (22)	Oceano (12 p.)
128	1997–98	26	**Sporting**	Porto	2–0	Roberto Assis (11), Edmílson (75)	
129	1998–99	16	**Porto**	Sporting	3–2	Doriva (35, 60), Jardel (62)	Edmílson (13), G. Heinze (82)
130	1998–99	33	Sporting	Porto	1–1	P. Barbosa (46)	Z. Zahovič (85)
131	1999–2000	9	**Porto**	Sporting	3–0	C. Chaínho (5), Jardel (59, 89)	
132	1999–2000	26	**Sporting**	Porto	2–0	A. Cruz (16), A. Acosta (37)	
133	2000–01	8	Sporting	**Porto**	0–1		Pena (70)
134	2000–01	25	Porto	Sporting	2–2	Deco (65), S. Marić (86)	J. Pinto (75), A. Acosta (76)
135	2001–02	1	**Sporting**	Porto	1–0	M. Niculae (65)	
136	2001–02	18	Porto	Sporting	2–2	J. Andrade (6 p.), Deco (73)	P. Barbosa (33), Jardel (35 p.)
137	2002–03	17	Sporting	**Porto**	0–1		Costinha (4)
138	2002–03	34	**Porto**	Sporting	2–0	H. Postiga (37), P. Contreras (78 o.g.)	
139	2003–04	3	**Porto**	Sporting	4–1	Derlei (3), E. Jankauskas (51), Maniche (64), B. McCarthy (89 p.)	
140	2003–04	20	Sporting	Porto	1–1	P. Barbosa (69 p.)	J. Costa (8)
141	2004–05	9	**Porto**	Sporting	3–0	B. McCarthy (57), Diego (80), Carlos Alberto (86)	
142	2004–05	26	**Sporting**	Porto	2–0	Liédson (61 p.), C. Martins (90)	
143	2005–06	13	Porto	Sporting	1–1	Jorginho (66)	Deivid (48)
144	2005–06	30	Sporting	**Porto**	0–1		Jorginho (84)
145	2006–07	7	Sporting	Porto	1–1	Y. Djaló (43)	R. Quaresma (47)
146	2006–07	22	Porto	**Sporting**	0–1		R. Tello (71)
147	2007–08	2	**Porto**	Sporting	1–0	R. Meireles (53)	
148	2007–08	17	**Sporting**	Porto	2–0	S. Vukčević (14), M. Izmailov (15)	
149	2008–09	5	Sporting	**Porto**	1–2	J. Moutinho (28 p.)	L. López (18), B. Alves (31)
150	2008–09	20	Porto	Sporting	0–0		
151	2009–10	6	**Porto**	Sporting	1–0	Falcao (2)	
152	2009–10	21	**Sporting**	Porto	3–0	Y. Djaló (6), M. Izmailov (45), M. Veloso (47)	
153	2010–11	12	Sporting	Porto	1–1	J. Valdés (37)	Falcao (57)
154	2010–11	27	**Porto**	Sporting	3–2	Falcao (26, 50), Walter (86)	A. Santos (11), M. Fernández (88)
155	2011–12	14	Sporting	Porto	0–0		
156	2011–12	29	**Porto**	Sporting	2–0	Hulk (82 p., 90)	
157	2012–13	6	**Porto**	Sporting	2–0	J. Martínez (9), J. Rodríguez (83 p.)	
158	2012–13	21	Sporting	Porto	0–0		
159	2013–14	8	**Porto**	Sporting	3–1	Josué (11 p.), Danilo (62), L. González (74)	W. Carvalho (60)
160	2013–14	23	**Sporting**	Porto	1–0	I. Slimani (51)	
161	2014–15	6	Sporting	Porto	1–1	J. Silva (2)	N. Sarr (56)
162	2014–15	23	**Porto**	Sporting	3–0	C. Tello (31, 58, 82)	
163	2015–16	15	**Sporting**	Porto	2–0	I. Slimani (27, 85)	
164	2015–16	32	Porto	**Sporting**	1–3	H. Herrera (35 p.)	I. Slimani (23, 44), Bruno César (85)
165	2016–17	3	**Sporting**	Porto	2–1	I. Slimani (14), G. Martins (26)	Felipe (8)
166	2016–17	20	**Porto**	Sporting	2–1	Soares (6, 40)	A. Ruiz (60)
167	2017–18	8	Sporting	Porto	0–0		
168	2017–18	25	**Porto**	Sporting	2–1	I. Marcano (28), Y. Brahimi (49)	R. Leão (45+1)
169	2018–19	17	Sporting	Porto	0–0		
170	2018–19	34	**Porto**	Sporting	2–1	D. Pereira (78), H. Herrera (87)	Luiz Phellype (61)
171	2019–20	15	Sporting	**Porto**	1–2	M. Acuña (44)	M. Marega (6), Soares (73)
172	2019–20	32	**Porto**	Sporting	2–0	D. Pereira (64), M. Marega (90+1)	
173	2020–21	4	Sporting	Porto	2–2	N. Santos (9), L. Vietto (87)	M. Uribe (25), J. Corona (45)
174	2020–21	21	Porto	Sporting	0–0		
175	2021–22	5	Sporting	Porto	1–1	N. Santos (16)	L. Díaz (71)
176	2021–22	21	Porto	Sporting	2–2	F. Vieira (38), M. Taremi (78)	Paulinho (8), N. Santos (34)
177	2022–23	3	**Porto**	Sporting	3–0	Evanilson (42), Uribe (77 p.), Galeno (86 p.)	
178	2022–23	19	Sporting	**Porto**	1–2	Chermiti (90+7)	Uribe (60), Pepê (90+4)
179	2023–24	14	**Sporting**	Porto	2–0	V. Gyökeres (11), P. Gonçalves (60)	
180	2023–24	31	Porto	Sporting	2–2	Evanilson (7), Pepe (40)	Gyökeres (87, 88)
181	2024–25	4	**Sporting**	Porto	2–0	V. Gyökeres (72 p.), Catamo (90+3)	
182	2024–25	21	Porto	Sporting	1–1	Namaso (90+4)	Fresneda (42)
183	2025–26	4	Sporting	**Porto**	1–2	N. Pérez (74 o.g.)	De Jong (61), William Gomes (64)
184	2025–26	21	Porto	Sporting	1–1	Fofana (76)	Suárez (90+10)

=== Head-to-head results ===
Porto wins	71
Draws	52
Sporting wins	61
Porto goals	256
Sporting goals	260
Total matches	184

Team	Home wins	Home draws	Home losses
Porto	49	29	14
Sporting	47	23	22

== Taça de Portugal matches ==
The matches listed below are only Taça de Portugal matches, club name in bold indicates win. The score is given at full-time; in the goals columns, the goalscorer and time when goal was scored is noted.

Team won the competition that season

#	Season	R.	Home team	Away team	Score	Goals (home)	Goals (away)
1	1943–44	L16 (1st leg)	**Porto**	Sporting	**2–0**	M. Correia Dias (61), Pinga (64)	
2	1943–44	L16 (2nd leg)	Sporting	Porto	**3–3**	Albano (15, 42), F. Peyroteo (52)	M. Correia Dias (32), A. Araújo (77), Lourenço (82)
3	1944–45	L16 (1st leg)	Sporting	Porto	**0–0**		
4	1944–45	L16 (2nd leg)	Porto	**Sporting**	**1–4**	F. Gomes da Costa (31)	J. Correia (6), Albano (55, 68), F. Peyroteo (75)
5	1951–52	SF (1st leg)	**Porto**	Sporting	**2–0**	Diamantino (32, 73)	
6	1951–52	SF (2nd leg)	**Sporting**	Porto	**4–2**	Bibelino (23 o.g.), Albano (71, 90), J. Travassos (?)	Diamantino (2), C. Vieira (4)
7	1951–52	SF (replay)	**Sporting**	Porto	**5–2**	M. Pacheco Nobre (38), Rola (65, 81), Amaro (70), J. Martins (85)	Diamantino (12), Vital (15)
8	1953–54	QF (1st leg)	Sporting	Porto	**1–1**	J. Martins (76)	Perdigão (6)
9	1953–54	QF (2nd leg)	Porto	**Sporting**	**2–4**	José Maria (4, 63)	Albano (43, 55), J. Martins (57, 87)
10	1957–58	SF (1st leg)	Sporting	Porto	**2–2**	J. Martins (22, 82)	Hernâni (48), C. Duarte (58)
11	1957–58	SF (2nd leg)	**Porto**	Sporting	**3–0**	Hernâni (69, 84), O. Silva (70)	
12	1960–61	SF (1st leg)	**Sporting**	Porto	**2–1**	M. Costa (12 o.g.), H. Sarmento (67 p.)	Hernâni (27)
13	1960–61	SF (2nd leg)	**Porto**	Sporting	**4–1**	Serafim (40, 52), Noé (79), Hernâni (86)	D. Arizaga (72)
14	1965–66	QF (1st leg)	**Sporting**	Porto	**1–0**	E. Figueiredo (3)	
15	1965–66	QF (2nd leg)	**Porto**	Sporting	**1–0**	C. Pinto (87 p.)	
16	1965–66	QF (replay)	**Sporting**	Porto	**2–0**	E. Figueiredo (15, 62)	
17	1966–67	L32 (1st leg)	Sporting	Porto	**1–1**	Carlitos (46)	Djalma (85)
18	1966–67	L32 (2nd leg)	**Porto**	Sporting	**1–0**	B. Velha (51)	
19	1976–77	QF	**Porto**	Sporting	**3–0**	Duda (2), A. Oliveira (13), Ailton (29)	
20	1977–78	F	Sporting	Porto	**1–1** (a.e.t.)	P. Meneses (49)	F. Gomes (48)
21	1977–78	F (replay)	**Sporting**	Porto	**2–1**	Vítor Gomes (55), M. Fernandes (62)	Seninho (80)
22	1983–84	SF	Sporting	Porto	**1–1** (a.e.t.)	M. Fernandes (68)	J. Magalhães (34)
23	1983–84	SF (replay)	**Porto**	Sporting	**2–1**	M. Walsh (46), J. Pacheco (61)	Jordão (1)
24	1986–87	SF	Porto	**Sporting**	**0–1** (a.e.t.)		M. Marques (119)
25	1991–92	L16	Sporting	**Porto**	**0–1**		E. Kostadinov (34)
26	1993–94	F	Porto	Sporting	**0–0** (a.e.t.)		
27	1993–94	F (replay)	**Porto**	Sporting	**2–1** (a.e.t.)	Rui Jorge (35), Aloísio (91)	B. Vujačić (55)
28	1995–96	SF	Porto	Sporting	**1–1** (a.e.t.)	J. Costa (90)	P. Barbosa (30)
29	1995–96	SF (replay)	**Sporting**	Porto	**1–0** (a.e.t.)	A. Martins (107)	
30	1999–2000	F	Porto	Sporting	**1–1** (a.e.t.)	Jardel (4)	P. Barbosa (56)
31	1999–2000	F (replay)	**Porto**	Sporting	**2–0**	Clayton (47), Deco (74)	
32	2000–01	SF	**Porto**	Sporting	**2–1** (a.e.t.)	Capucho (31, 100)	Beto (13)
33	2005–06	SF	Porto	Sporting	**1–1** (5–4 p.)	B. McCarthy (115)	Liédson (108)
34	2007–08	F	**Sporting**	Porto	**2–0** (a.e.t.)	Rodrigo Tiuí (111, 117)	
35	2008–09	L32	Sporting	Porto	**1–1** (4–5 p.)	Liédson (29)	Hulk (59)
36	2009–10	QF	**Porto**	Sporting	**5–2**	Rolando (18), Falcao (34, 42), S. Varela (48), M. González (57)	M. Izmailov (22), Liédson (90)
37	2014–15	L64	Porto	**Sporting**	**1–3**	J. Martínez (35)	I. Marcano (31 o.g.), Nani (39), A. Carrillo (83)
38	2017–18	SF (1st leg)	**Porto**	Sporting	**1–0**	Soares (60)	
39	2017–18	SF (2nd leg)	**Sporting**	Porto	**1–0** (5–4 p.)	S. Coates (85)	
40	2018–19	F	Sporting	Porto	**2–2** (5–4 p.)	D. Pereira (45 o.g.), B. Dost (101)	Soares (41), Felipe (120+1)
41	2021–22	SF (1st leg)	Sporting	**Porto**	**1–2**	P. Sarabia (49)	M. Taremi (59 p.), Evanilson (64)
42	2021–22	SF (2nd leg)	**Porto**	Sporting	**1–0**	T. Martínez (82)	
43	2023–24	F	**Porto**	Sporting	**2–1** (a.e.t.)	Evanilson (25), Taremi (100 p.)	St. Juste (20)
44	2025–26	SF (1st leg)	**Sporting**	Porto	**1–0**	Suárez (62 p.)	
45	2025–26	SF (2nd leg)	Porto	Sporting	**0–0**		

=== Head-to-head results ===
Porto wins	17
Draws	14
Sporting wins	14
Porto goals	61
Sporting goals	57
Total matches	45

Team	Home wins	Home draws	Home losses	Other venue wins
Porto	12	3	4	3
Sporting	8	7	2	2

== Taça da Liga matches ==
The matches listed below are only Taça da Liga matches; club name in bold indicates win. The score is given at full-time; in the goals columns, the goalscorer and time when goal was scored is noted.

Team won the competition that season

#	Season	R.	Home team	Away team	Score	Goals (home)	Goals (away)
1	2008–09	SF	**Sporting**	Porto	**4–1**	L. Romagnoli (36 p., 48 p.), Derlei (66, 81)	T. Sektioui (9)
2	2013–14	FG	Sporting	Porto	**0–0**		
3	2017–18	SF	Sporting	Porto	**0–0** (4–3 p.)		
4	2018–19	F	Sporting	Porto	**1–1** (3–1 p.)	B. Dost (90+2 p.)	Fernando (79)
5	2020–21	SF	**Sporting**	Porto	**2–1**	J. Cabral (86, 90+4)	M. Marega (79)
6	2022–23	F	Sporting	**Porto**	**0–2**		S. Eustáquio (10), I. Marcano (86)
7	2024–25	SF	**Sporting**	Porto	**1–0**	Gyökeres (56)	

=== Head-to-head results ===
Porto wins	1
Draws	3
Sporting wins	3
Porto goals	5
Sporting goals	8
Total matches	7

Team	Home wins	Home draws	Home losses	Other venue wins
Porto	0	0	0	1
Sporting	1	1	0	2

== Supertaça Cândido de Oliveira matches ==
The matches listed below are only Supertaça Cândido de Oliveira matches; club name in bold indicates win. The score is given at full-time; in the goals columns, the goalscorer and time when goal was scored is noted.

Team won the competition that season

#	Season	R.	Home team	Away team	Score	Goals (home)	Goals (away)
1	1995	1st leg	Sporting	Porto	**0–0**		
2	1995	2nd leg	Porto	Sporting	**2–2**	Domingos (19, 53)	N. Naybet (22), A. Ouattara (74)
3	1995	Replay	**Sporting**	Porto	**3–0**	R. Sá Pinto (9, 38), C. Xavier (86 p.)	
4	2000	1st leg	Porto	Sporting	**1–1**	D. Alenichev (89)	A. Acosta (60)
5	2000	2nd leg	Sporting	Porto	**0–0**		
6	2000	Replay	**Sporting**	Porto	**1–0**	A. Acosta (p. 31)	
7	2007	F	**Sporting**	Porto	**1–0**	M. Izmailov (75)	
8	2008	F	**Sporting**	Porto	**2–0**	Y. Djaló (45, 57)	
9	2024	F	Sporting	**Porto**	**3–4** (a.e.t.)	G. Inácio (6), P. Gonçalves (9), G. Quenda (24)	Galeno (28, 66), N. González (64), I. Jaime (101)

=== Head-to-head results ===
Porto wins	1
Draws	4
Sporting wins	4
Porto goals	7
Sporting goals	13
Total matches	9

Team	Home wins	Home draws	Home losses	Other venue wins
Porto	0	2	0	1
Sporting	0	2	0	4

== Campeonato de Portugal matches ==
The matches listed below are only Campeonato de Portugal matches. The Campeonato de Portugal was created in 1922 and was the primary tournament in Portugal, where all teams competed from around the country. In 1938, the Campeonato de Portugal became what is now known as the Taça de Portugal. The club name in bold indicates win. The score is given at full-time and half-time (in brackets), and in the goals columns, the goalscorer and time when goal was scored is noted.

Team won the competition that season

#	Season	R.	Home team	Away team	Score	Goals (home)	Goals (away)
1	1922	F (1st leg)	**Porto**	Sporting	**2–1**	Bastos (25, 86)	Ramos (9)
2	1922	F (2nd leg)	**Sporting**	Porto	**2–0**	Portela ( ), Pereira ( )	
3	1922	F (Replay)	**Porto**	Sporting	**3–1** (a.e.t.)	Silva (51), Nunes (100), Brito (102)	Ramos (70)
4	1922–23	SF	**Sporting**	Porto	**3–0**	Maia (24), Stromp (66, 81)	
5	1924–25	F	**Porto**	Sporting	**2–1**	Hall (20), Costa (53 p.)	Gonçalves (50)
6	1928–29	QF	**Sporting**	Porto	**3–2**	Martins (23, 73, 81)	Carneiro (11, 64)
7	1932–33	SF (1st leg)	Sporting	Porto	**1–1**	Valadas (52)	Mesquita (89)
8	1932–33	SF (2nd leg)	Porto	Sporting	**0–0**		
9	1932–33	SF (Replay)	**Sporting**	Porto	**3–1**	Mourão (47), Valadas (67), Gralho (80)	Pinga (10)
10	1934–35	SF (1st leg)	**Sporting**	Porto	**4–0**	Nunes (21, 40), Soeiro (47), Mourão (60)	
11	1934–35	SF (2nd leg)	Porto	Sporting	**0–0**		
12	1936–37	F	**Porto**	Sporting	**3–2**	Carneiro (8), Nunes (60), Vianinha (76 p.)	Nogueira (32), Pireza (80)

=== Head-to-head results ===
Porto wins	4
Draws	3
Sporting wins	5
Porto goals	14
Sporting goals	21
Total matches	12

== Players who played for both clubs ==
- (Brazil) Vianinha (Sporting CP 1935–1936, Porto 1936–1939)
- (Brazil) Osvaldo da Silva (Porto 1958–1959, Sporting CP 1963–1966)
- (Portugal) Armando Manhiça (Sporting CP 1964–1970, Porto 1970–1974)
- (Portugal) Manuel Duarte (Sporting CP 1966–1970, Porto 1970–1971)
- (Portugal) Armando Luís (Sporting CP 1968–1969, Porto 1972–1973)
- (Portugal) Fernando Peres (Sporting CP 1965–1973, Porto 1974–1975)
- (Portugal) Joaquim Dinis (Sporting CP 1969–1975, Porto 1975–1977)
- (Portugal) Carlos Alhinho (Sporting CP 1972–1975, Porto 1976)
- (Brazil) Ailton (Porto 1974–1977, Sporting CP 1977–1979)
- (Portugal) António Vaz (Porto 1967–1968 & 1969–1970, Sporting CP 1979–1981)
- (Portugal) António Oliveira (Porto 1970–1979 & 1980, Sporting CP 1981–1985)
- (Portugal) Augusto Inácio (Sporting CP 1974–1982, Porto 1982–1989)
- (Portugal) Eurico Gomes (Sporting CP 1979–1982, Porto 1982–1987)
- (Portugal) Gabriel (Porto 1974–1983, Sporting CP 1983–1987)
- (Portugal) Romeu Silva (Porto 1979–1983, Sporting CP 1983–1986)
- (Portugal) António Sousa (Porto 1979–84 & 1986–89, Sporting CP 1984–1986)
- (Portugal) Luís Matos (Sporting CP 1974–1977, Porto 1984–1986)
- (Portugal) Ademar Marques (Sporting CP 1977–1983, Porto 1984–1985)
- (Portugal) Jaime Pacheco (Porto 1979–1984 & 1986–1989, Sporting CP 1984–1986)
- (Portugal) Paulo Futre (Sporting CP 1983–1984, Porto 1984–1987)
- (Brazil) Paulinho Cascavel (Porto 1984–1985, Sporting CP 1987–1990)
- (Portugal) Jorge Plácido (Porto 1987–1988, Sporting CP 1988–1989)
- (Portugal) António Morato (Sporting CP 1983–1989, Porto 1989–1990)
- (Portugal) Fernando Gomes (Porto 1972–1980 & 1982–1989, Sporting CP 1989–1991)
- (Portugal) Fernando Mendes (Sporting CP 1985–1989, Porto 1996–1999)
- (Portugal) Paulo Costinha (Sporting CP 1993–1997, Porto 1997–99)
- (Portugal) Emílio Peixe (Sporting CP 1991–1995 & 1996–1997, Porto 1997–2002)
- (Portugal) Rui Correia (Sporting CP 1986–1988, Porto 1997–2001)
- (Portugal) Capucho (Sporting CP 1992–1995, Porto 1997–2003)
- (Portugal) Rui Jorge (Porto 1992–1998, Sporting CP 1998–2005)
- (Portugal) Fernando Nélson (Sporting CP 1991–1996, Porto 1998–2002)
- (Brazil) Edmílson (Porto 1995–1997, Sporting CP 1998–2000)
- (Portugal) Bino (Porto 1990–1991 & 1992–1993 & 1995–1997, Sporting CP 1998–2001)
- (Brazil) Mário Jardel (Porto 1996–2000, Sporting CP 2001–2003)
- (Portugal) Nuno Valente (Sporting CP 1994–1994 & 1997–1999, Porto 2002–2005)
- (Brazil) Clayton (Porto 2000–2003, Sporting CP 2003–2005)
- (Portugal) Ricardo Fernandes (Sporting CP 2002–2003, Porto 2003–2004)
- (Portugal) Ricardo Quaresma (Sporting CP 2001–2003, Porto 2004–2009 & 2014)
- (Portugal) João Paulo (Sporting CP 2003, Porto 2006–2009)
- (Paraguay) Carlos Paredes (Porto 2000–2002, Sporting CP 2006–2008)
- (Brazil) Derlei (Porto 2002–2005, Sporting CP 2007–2009)
- (Portugal) Hélder Postiga (Porto 2001–2003, 2004–2006 & 2006–2008, Sporting CP 2008–2012)
- (Portugal) Beto (Sporting CP 2001, Porto 2009–2011)
- (Portugal) Silvestre Varela (Sporting CP 2005–2006, Porto 2009–2014)
- (Portugal) João Moutinho (Sporting CP 2005–2010, Porto 2010–2013)
- (Portugal) Maniche (Porto 2002–2005, Sporting CP 2010–2011)
- (Portugal) Pedro Mendes (Porto 2003–2004, Sporting CP 2010–2011)
- (Brazil) Evaldo (Porto 2004, Sporting CP 2010–2012)
- (Portugal) Nuno André Coelho (Porto 2009–2010, Sporting CP 2010–2011)
- (Portugal) Hugo Ventura (Porto 2007–2013, Sporting CP 2013) (Note: Ventura did not play for Sporting CP's senior team but played for the reserve team, Sporting B.)
- (Portugal) Miguel Lopes (Porto 2009–2010, Sporting CP 2013, 2014–2015)
- (Russia) Marat Izmailov (Sporting CP 2008–2013, Porto 2013)
- (Portugal) Liédson (Sporting CP 2003–2011, Porto 2013)

== Managers who managed both clubs ==
- (Hungary) József Szabó (Porto 1928–1935 & 1945–1947, Sporting CP 1937–1945 & 1953–1954)
- (Portugal) Cândido de Oliveira (Sporting CP 1945–1946 & 1947–1949, Porto 1952–1953)
- (Argentina) Alejandro Scopelli (Porto 1948–1949, Sporting CP 1955–1956)
- (Portugal) Fernando Vaz (Porto 1952–1953 & 1954–1955, Sporting CP 1959–1960 & 1969–1972)
- (Brazil) Otto Glória (Sporting CP 1961 & 1965–1966, Porto 1964–1965)
- (Chile) Fernando Riera (Porto 1972–1973, Sporting CP 1974–1975)
- (Portugal) António Morais (Porto 1983–1984, Sporting CP 1988)
- (England) Bobby Robson (Sporting CP 1992–1994, Porto 1994–1996)
- (Portugal) António Oliveira (Sporting CP 1982–1983, Porto 1996–1998)
- (Portugal) Octávio Machado (Sporting CP 1996–1997 Porto 2001–2002)
- (Portugal) Fernando Santos (Porto 1998–2001, Sporting CP 2003–2004)
- (Portugal) José Couceiro (Porto 2005, Sporting CP 2011)
- (Portugal) Jesualdo Ferreira (Porto 2006–2010, Sporting CP 2013)
- (Portugal) José Peseiro (Sporting CP 2004–2005, Porto 2016)

== In popular culture ==
The comedy film O Leão da Estrela (1947) starring António Silva, a classic of the Portuguese cinema, as well as its remake of 2015 starring Miguel Guilherme, revolve around the FC Porto–Sporting CP rivalry.

== See also ==
- O Clássico
- Derby de Lisboa
- List of association football club rivalries in Europe
