= List of FC Porto records and statistics =

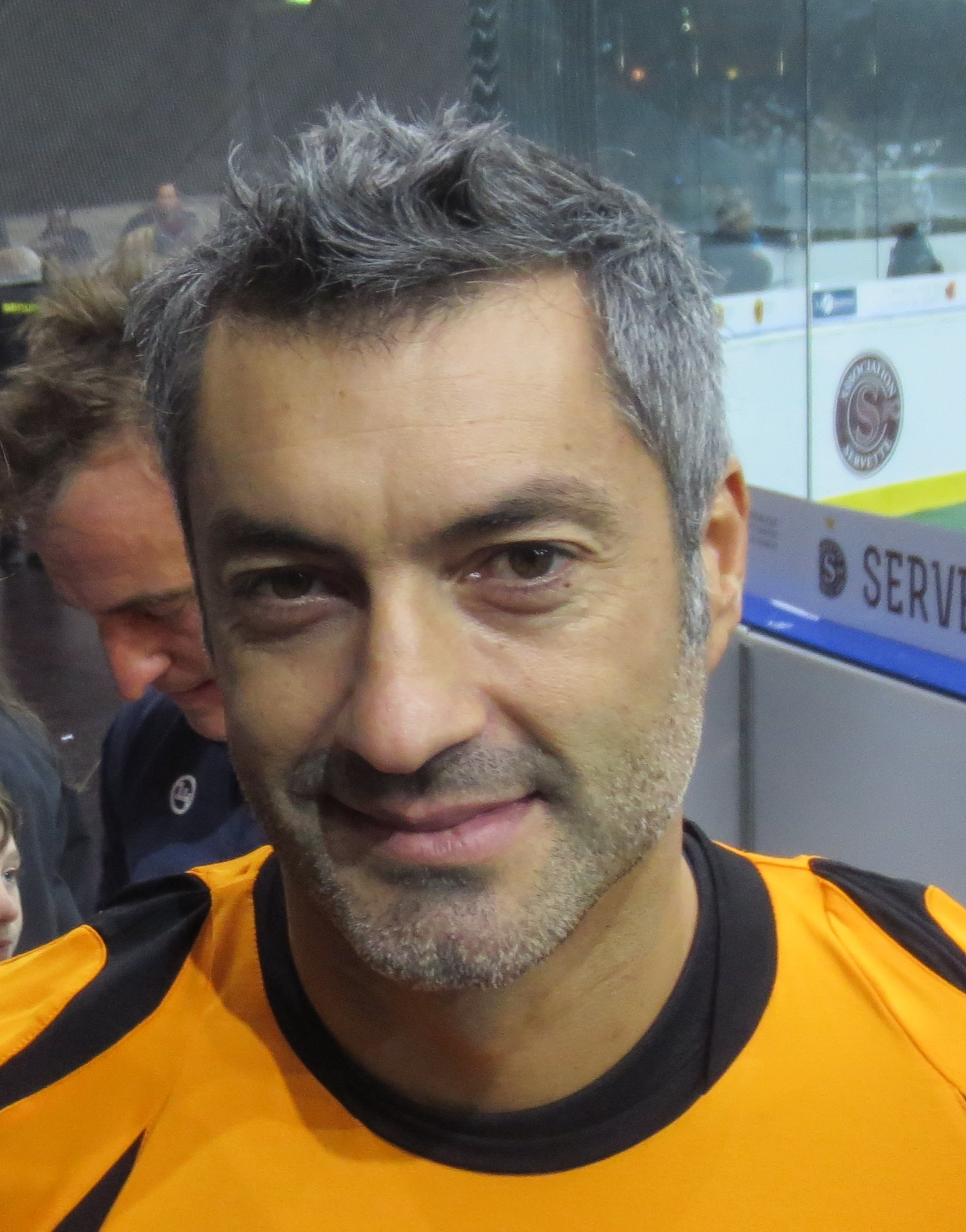
Former goalkeeper and captain Vítor Baía won a club-record 25 trophies, including 10 leagues and 5 cups.

Futebol Clube do Porto is a Portuguese sports club based in Porto, which is best known for its professional association football team. They played their first match in 1893, but only won their first trophy in 1911. Two years later, Porto began competing in a regional championship, and in 1922 they won the inaugural edition of the Campeonato de Portugal, the first nationwide club competition, to become the first Portuguese champions. In 1934, an experimental two-tier league competition was introduced in Portuguese football; four years later, the first-level Primeira Liga was officially established as the top-tier league championship, from which Porto have never been relegated. Involved in international competitions since 1956, the club beat Bayern Munich in the 1987 European Cup Final to win its first continental silverware.

Porto have won 31 league titles – including an unparalleled series of five consecutive top-place finishes from 1994 to 1999 – and lifted the Taça de Portugal on 20 occasions and 1 Taça da Liga. In addition, they have more Supertaça Cândido de Oliveira trophies (25) than every other winning club combined. Internationally, Porto is the most successful Portuguese club, with a total of seven titles. Former captain João Pinto and striker Fernando Gomes hold the club records for most appearances (587) and goals (352), respectively. In international competitions, these records belong respectively to Vítor Baía (99) and Radamel Falcao (22). Baía is also the club's most successful player, with a total of 25 titles. José Maria Pedroto is the club's longest-serving coach, overseeing 327 matches in nine seasons.

This list includes the honours won by Porto at all levels and all-time statistics and records set by the club, its players and its coaches. The players section includes the club's top goalscorers and those who have made most appearances in first-team competitive matches. It also displays international achievements by players representing Porto, and the highest transfer fees paid and received by the club. The club's attendance records since moving to the Estádio das Antas in 1952 and to the Estádio do Dragão in 2004 are also included.

All figures are updated as of match played on 3 August 2024.

== Honours ==
Porto won the inaugural Taça José Monteiro da Costa tournament in 1911, securing its first-ever trophy. Three years later, the club clinched the first of a total of 30 regional championship titles. In 1922, their regional success expanded to a national level, after victory in the inaugural staging of the Campeonato de Portugal crowned Porto as the first Portuguese champions. The club then won its first Primeira Liga title in 1934–35, when it was still a provisional competition, and again in 1938–39, when it became the official domestic top-tier championship. In 1955–56, Porto lifted the Taça de Portugal for the first time, and in doing so secured their first league and cup double. The following season saw the club's international stage premiere in the European Cup. Thirty years later, Porto beat Bayern Munich in the 1987 European Cup Final to win their maiden European silverware. The following season brought the club further successes in the UEFA Super Cup and Intercontinental Cup. Since taking their first Supertaça Cândido de Oliveira title in 1981, Porto have a record of 25 wins in 35 appearances, more than any other winner combined.

As of 1 August 2026, Porto have won a total of 88 titles (regional competitions not considered), of which 81 were achieved domestically and 7 were obtained in international competitions. The club's most recent honour is the 2026 Supertaça Cândido de Oliveira.

=== Domestic ===
- Primeira Liga

Winners (31): 1934–35, 1938–39, 1939–40, 1955–56, 1958–59, 1977–78, 1978–79, 1984–85, 1985–86, 1987–88, 1989–90, 1991–92, 1992–93, 1994–95, 1995–96, 1996–97, 1997–98, 1998–99, 2002–03, 2003–04, 2005–06, 2006–07, 2007–08, 2008–09, 2010–11, 2011–12, 2012–13, 2017–18, 2019–20, 2021–22, 2025–26

- Taça de Portugal

Winners (20): 1955–56, 1957–58, 1967–68, 1976–77, 1983–84, 1987–88, 1990–91, 1993–94, 1997–98, 1999–2000, 2000–01, 2002–03, 2005–06, 2008–09, 2009–10, 2010–11, 2019–20, 2021–22, 2022–23, 2023–24

- Taça da Liga

Winners (1): 2022–23

- Supertaça Cândido de Oliveira (Note: The club is the record holder for most wins in this competition.)

Winners (25): 1981, 1983, 1984, 1986, 1990, 1991, 1993, 1994, 1996, 1998, 1999, 2001, 2003, 2004, 2006, 2009, 2010, 2011, 2012, 2013, 2018, 2020, 2022, 2024, 2026

- Campeonato de Portugal (Note: The club is the joint record holder for most wins in this competition, alongside Sporting CP.)

Winners (4): 1921–22, 1924–25, 1931–32, 1936–37

=== Continental ===
- European Cup / UEFA Champions League

Winners (2): 1986–87, 2003–04

- UEFA Cup / UEFA Europa League

Winners (2): 2002–03, 2010–11

- UEFA Super Cup

Winners (1): 1987

=== International ===
- Intercontinental Cup

Winners (2): 1987, 2004

=== Doubles ===
- Primeira Liga and Taça de Portugal

9: 1955–56, 1987–88, 1997–98, 2002–03, 2005–06, 2008–09, 2010–11, 2019–20, 2021–22

- Taça de Portugal and Taça da Liga

1: 2022–23

- Primeira Liga and UEFA Champions League

1: 2003–04

- Primeira Liga and UEFA Cup / Europa League

2: 2002–03, 2010–11

=== Trebles ===
- Primeira Liga, Taça de Portugal and Supertaça Cândido de Oliveira

1: 2010–11

- Taça de Portugal, Taça da Liga and Supertaça Cândido de Oliveira

1: 2022–23

- Primeira Liga, Taça de Portugal and UEFA Cup / Europa League

2: 2002–03, 2010–11

=== Quadruples ===
- Four titles in one season

2: 1987–88, 2010–11

=== Regional ===
- Taça José Monteiro da Costa

Winners (5): 1911, 1912, 1914, 1915, 1916

- Campeonato do Porto

Winners (30): 1914–15, 1915–16, 1916–17, 1918–19, 1919–20, 1920–21, 1921–22, 1922–23, 1923–24, 1924–25, 1925–26, 1926–27, 1927–28, 1928–29, 1929–30, 1930–31, 1931–32, 1932–33, 1933–34, 1934–35, 1935–36, 1936–37, 1937–38, 1938–39, 1940–41, 1942–43, 1943–44, 1944–45, 1945–46, 1946–47

- Taça de Honra / Taça AF Porto

Winners (14): 1915–16, 1916–17, 1947–48, 1956–57, 1957–58, 1959–60, 1960–61, 1961–62, 1962–63, 1963–64, 1964–65, 1965–66, 1980–81, 1983–84

== Players ==
=== Appearances ===
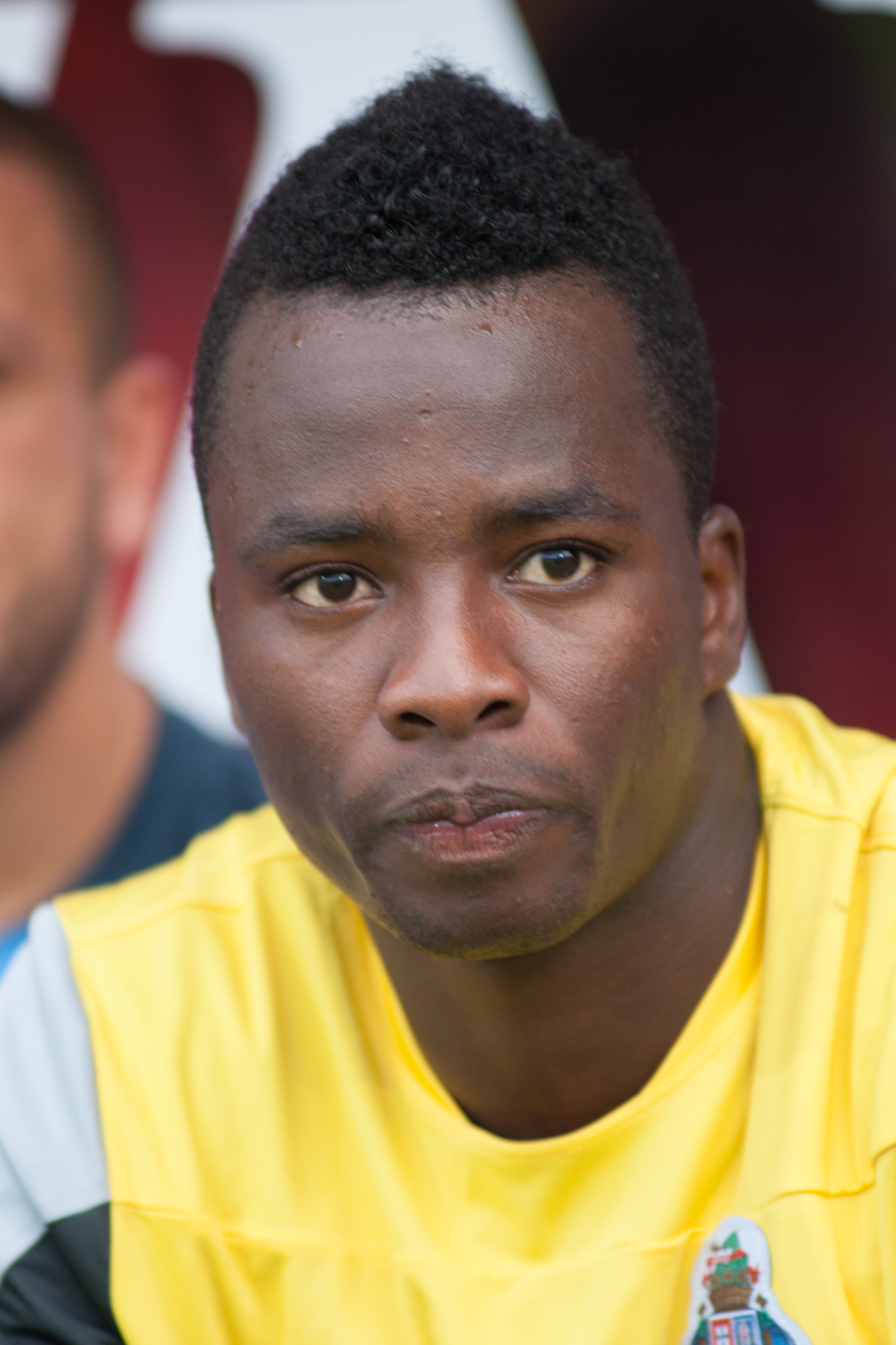
Angolan goalkeeper Kadú is the youngest player to play in Porto's first team, at 16 years old.

- Most appearances in a season: 55 – Pepê (2022-23 Primeira Liga)
- Most consecutive appearances in international club competitions: 50 – Ljubinko Drulović;
- Oldest starter: Thiago Silva – 41 years, 3 months and 23 days (2025–26 Taça de Portugal, 14 January 2026);
- Oldest league title winner: Pepe – 39 years, 2 months and 11 days (2021-22 Primeira Liga, 7 May 2022);
- Youngest debutant: Kadú – 16 years, 10 months and 15 days (against Pêro Pinheiro, 2011–12 Taça de Portugal third round, 15 October 2011);
- Youngest starter: Fábio Silva – 17 years, 2 months and 6 days (against Santa Clara, 2019–20 Taça da Liga, 25 September 2019);
- Youngest debutant in the league: Fábio Silva – 17 years and 22 days (against Gil Vicente, 2019–20 Primeira Liga, 10 August 2019);
- Youngest starter in the league: Fábio Silva – 17 years, 3 months and 22 days (against Boavista, 2019–20 Primeira Liga, 10 November 2019);
- Youngest league title winner: Fábio Silva – 17 years, 11 months and 27 days (2019–20 Primeira Liga, 15 July 2020);
- Youngest debutant in the European Cup/UEFA Champions League: Rúben Neves – 17 years, 5 months and 8 days (against Lille, 2014–15 UEFA Champions League play-off, first leg, 20 August 2014);
- Youngest captain in the European Cup/UEFA Champions League: Rúben Neves – 18 years and 221 days (against Maccabi Tel Aviv, 2015–16 UEFA Champions League group stage, 20 October 2015). (Note: Also the youngest UEFA Champions League captain ever, beating Rafael van der Vaart's previous record of 20 years and 217 days from 2003.)
- Youngest debutant in a UEFA competition: Fábio Silva – 17 years and 2 months (against Young Boys, 2019–20 UEFA Europa League group stage, 19 September 2019).

==== Most appearances ====
Competitive matches only, includes appearances as used substitute. Numbers in brackets indicate goals scored.

Rank	Name	Nationality	Years	League	Cup	Europe	Others^{1}	Total	Ref
1	João Pinto	Portugal	1981–1997	408 (17)	75 (2)	79 (0)	25 (1)	587 (20)	
2	Vítor Baía	Portugal	1988–1996, 1998–2007	406 (0)	43 (0)	99 (0)	18 (0)	566 (0)	
3	Aloísio	Brazil	1990–2001	332 (15)	44 (2)	75 (1)	23 (0)	474 (18)	
4	Fernando Gomes	Portugal	1974–1980, 1983–1989	341 (288)	55 (45)	46 (18)	9 (4)	451 (355)	
5	Virgílio	Portugal	1947–1962	346 (5)	85 (1)	4 (0)	0 (0)	435 (6)	
6	Jaime Magalhães	Portugal	1980–1995	280 (29)	58 (8)	54 (7)	17 (1)	409 (45)	
7	António André	Portugal	1984–1995	276 (23)	40 (4)	52 (4)	17 (0)	385 (31)	
8	Jorge Costa	Portugal	1992–2005	251 (16)	31 (4)	91 (4)	10 (1)	383 (25)	
9	Domingos Paciência	Portugal	1983–1987	263 (105)	48 (21)	51 (10)	17 (6)	379 (142)	
10	Hernâni	Portugal	1950–1952, 1953–1964	255 (128)	76 (54)	4 (1)	0 (0)	335 (183)	

1. Includes the Supertaça Cândido de Oliveira.

=== Goalscorers ===
- Most goals in the league: 288 – Fernando Gomes;
- Most goals in the league in a season: 39 – Fernando Gomes (1984–85 Primeira Divisão);
- Most league top scorer awards: 6 – Fernando Gomes (1976–77, 1977–78, 1978–79, 1982–83, 1983–84, 1984–85);
- Most goals in international club competitions in a season: 17 – Radamel Falcao (2010–11 UEFA Europa League);
- Youngest scorer in the league: Fábio Silva – 17 years, 3 months and 8 days (2–0 against Famalicão, 2019–20 Primeira Liga, 27 October 2019).
- Youngest scorer in any competition: Fábio Silva – 17 years and 3 months (5–0 against Coimbrões, 2019–20 Taça de Portugal, 19 October 2019).
- Youngest hat-trick scorer in the league: Diogo Jota – 19 years, 9 months and 28 days (4–0 against Nacional, 2016–17 Primeira Liga, 1 October 2016).

==== Top goalscorers in all competitions ====
Matches played (including as used substitute) appear in brackets.

Rank	Name	Nationality	Years	League	Cup	Europe	Others^{1}	Total	Ref
1	Fernando Gomes	Portugal	1974–1980, 1982–1989	288 (341)	45 (55)	18 (46)	4 (9)	355 (451)	
2	Hernâni	Portugal	1950–1952, 1953–1964	128 (255)	54 (76)	1 (4)	0 (0)	183 (335)	
3	Mário Jardel	Brazil	1996–2000	130 (125)	17 (13)	19 (32)	2 (5)	168 (175)	
4	António Teixeira	Portugal	1952–1962	125 (173)	38 (45)	1 (2)	0 (0)	164 (220)	
5	Pinga	Portugal	1930–1946	89 (162)	31 (27)	0 (0)	26 (32)	146 (221)	
6	Domingos Paciência	Portugal	1983–1987	105 (263)	21 (48)	10 (51)	6 (17)	142 (379)	
7	Araújo	Portugal	1942–1949, 1950–1952	122 (151)	15 (17)	0 (0)	0 (0)	137 (168)	
8	Correia Dias	Portugal	1939–1940, 1941–1949	105 (114)	8 (8)	0 (0)	0 (0)	113 (122)	
9	Custódio Pinto	Portugal	1961–1971	80 (243)	16 (60)	6 (8)	0 (0)	102 (311)	
10	Carlos Duarte	Portugal	1952–1964	73 (176)	25 (51)	0 (1)	0 (0)	98 (228)	

1. Includes the Campeonato de Portugal and the Supertaça Cândido de Oliveira.

==== Top goalscorers in international club competitions ====
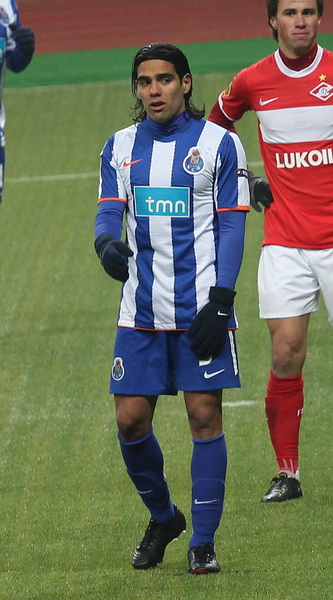
Radamel Falcao is the club's top scorer in international competitions, with 22 goals.

Matches played (including as used substitute) appear in brackets.

Rank	Name	Nationality	Years	Total	Ref
1	Radamel Falcao	Colombia	2009–2011	22 (24)	
2	Mário Jardel	Brazil	1996–2000	19 (32)	
3	Fernando Gomes	Portugal	1974–1980, 1982–1989	18 (46)	
4	Rabah Madjer	Algeria	1985–1988, 1988–1991	15 (24)	
5	Hulk	Brazil	2008–2012	15 (43)	
6	Derlei	Brazil	2002–2005	14 (28)	
7	Jackson Martínez	Colombia	2012–2015	14 (29)	
8	Lisandro López	Argentina	2005–2009	13 (28)	
9	Lucho González	Argentina	2005–2009, 2011–2014	13 (46)	
10	Vincent Aboubakar	Cameroon	2014–2016, 2017–2020	13 (20)	

=== National team ===
This section refers only to senior national team appearances while playing for Porto.

- Most capped player: João Pinto – 71 caps for Portugal;
- First capped player: Artur Augusto, for Portugal (1–3 against Spain, 18 December 1921);
- First player capped for Portugal to play in the Olympic football tournament: Valdemar Mota (1928 Summer Olympics);
- First player capped for Portugal to play in the World Cup finals: Alberto Festa (1966 FIFA World Cup); (Note: Two other club players, Américo and Custódio Pinto, were also called for the national team, but were never fielded.)
- First players capped for Portugal to play in the European Championship finals: António Frasco, Eurico Gomes, Jaime Pacheco, António Lima Pereira, João Pinto, and António Sousa (UEFA Euro 1984); (Note: Three other club players were called for the national team: Fernando Gomes played the first match as a substitute, while Eduardo Luís and Vermelhinho were never fielded.)
- Youngest starter for Portugal: Rúben Neves – 18 years, 8 months and 4 days (2–0 against Luxembourg, friendly, 17 November 2015).
- Youngest hat-trick scorer for Portugal: André Silva – 20 years, 11 months and 5 days (6–0 against Faroe Islands, 2018 FIFA World Cup qualification, 10 October 2016).

=== Honours ===
- Most titles: 25 – Vítor Baía;
- Most league titles: 10 – Vitor Baía;
- Most consecutive league titles: 5 – Aloísio, Rui Barros, Jorge Costa, Ljubinko Drulović, António Folha, and Paulinho Santos (1994–1999);
- Most Taça de Portugal titles: 5 – Aloísio, Vitor Baía, Jorge Costa, Domingos Paciência, Paulinho Santos, and Carlos Secretário;
- Most Supertaça titles: 8 – João Pinto;
- Most international club competition titles: 3
  - 1986–87 European Cup, 1987 European Super Cup, and 1987 Intercontinental Cup:
    - António André, Fernando Gomes, Augusto Inácio, Jaime Magalhães, Józef Młynarczyk, António Lima Pereira, João Pinto, Quim and António Sousa.
  - 2002–03 UEFA Cup, 2003–04 UEFA Champions League, and 2004 Intercontinental Cup:
    - Vítor Baía, Jorge Costa, Ricardo Costa, Costinha, Derlei, Pedro Emanuel, and Maniche.

=== Award winners ===
The following players have been awarded while representing the club.

European Golden Shoe

- (Portugal) Fernando Gomes (36 goals), (39 goals) – 1983, 1985
- (Brazil) Mário Jardel (36 goals) – 1999

Best European Goalkeeper

- (Portugal) Vítor Baía – 2004

African Footballer of the Year

- (Algeria) Rabah Madjer – 1987

UEFA Club Footballer of the Year

- (Portugal) Deco – 2004

UEFA Club Goalkeeper of the Year

- (Portugal) Vítor Baía – 2004

UEFA Club Defender of the Year

- (Portugal) Ricardo Carvalho – 2004

UEFA Club Midfielder of the Year

- (Portugal) Deco – 2004

UEFA Team of the Year

- (Portugal) Paulo Ferreira – 2003
- (Portugal) Ricardo Carvalho and Maniche – 2004

UEFA Fans' Goal of the Tournament

- (Iran) Mehdi Taremi – 2021

=== Competitions winners ===
The following players have won their respective continental competitions while part of the club.

UEFA European Championship

- (Portugal) Danilo Pereira – 2016

UEFA Nations League

- (Portugal) Pepe and Danilo Pereira – 2019
- (Portugal) Diogo Costa and Rodrigo Mora – 2025

Africa Cup of Nations

- (Algeria) Rabah Madjer – 1990
- (Algeria) Yacine Brahimi – 2019

Copa América

- (Peru) Teófilo Cubillas – 1975
- (Brazil) Branco – 1989
- (Brazil) Helton – 2007
- (Uruguay) Cristian Rodríguez and Álvaro Pereira – 2011
- (Argentina) Agustín Marchesín – 2021

CONCACAF Gold Cup

- (Mexico) Héctor Herrera – 2015

CONCACAF Cup

- (Mexico) Miguel Layún, Héctor Herrera and Jesús Corona – 2015

=== Player of the Year ===
The Dragão de Ouro Award is a yearly award presented by Porto to its Footballer of the Year.

Year	Winner
2003	(Portugal) Ricardo Carvalho
2004	(Portugal) Maniche
2005	(Portugal) Ricardo Quaresma
2006	(Argentina) Lucho González
2007	(Portugal) José Bosingwa
2008	(Uruguay) Jorge Fucile
2009	(Portugal) Raul Meireles
2010	(Brazil) Hulk
2011	(Brazil) Hulk
2012	(Brazil) Maicon
2013	(Portugal) João Moutinho
2014	(Brazil) Danilo
2015	(Mexico) Héctor Herrera
2016	(Portugal) Danilo Pereira
2017	(Algeria) Yacine Brahimi
2018	(Brazil) Alex Telles
2019	(Mali) Moussa Marega
2020	(Mexico) Jesús Corona
2021	(Portugal) Sérgio Oliveira
2022	(Portugal) Otávio
2023	(Brazil) Pepê
2024	(Portugal) Diogo Costa
2025	(Portugal) Rodrigo Mora

=== Transfers ===
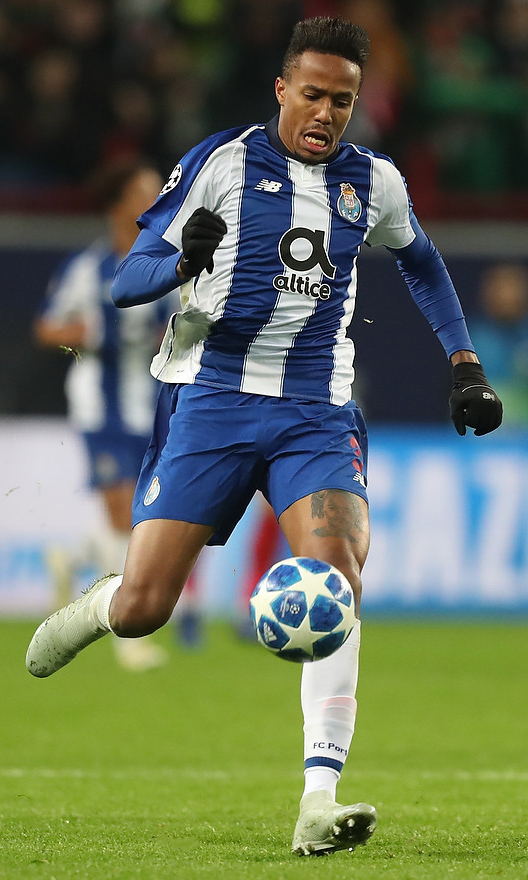
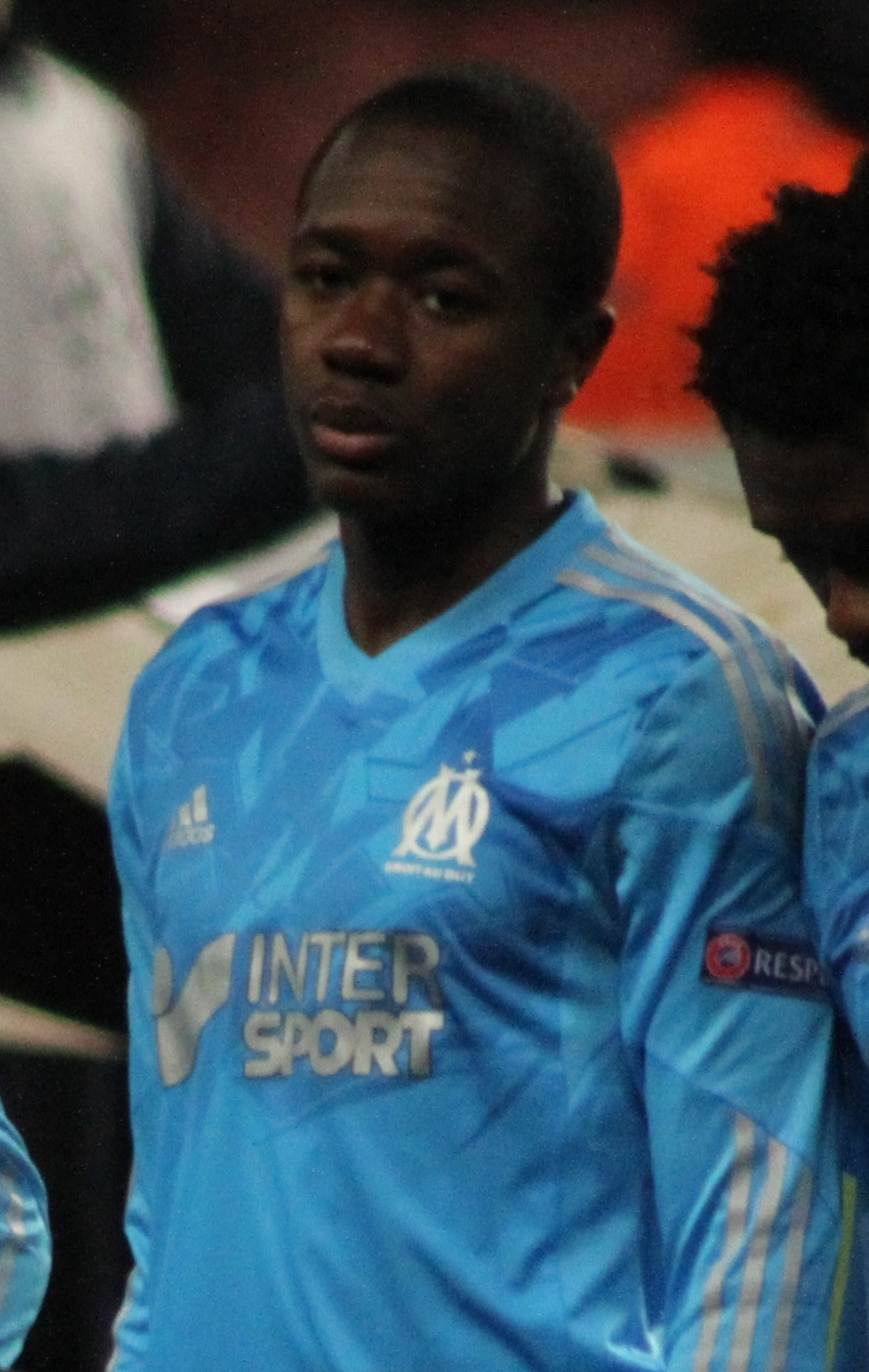
The transfers of Éder Militão (left) and Giannelli Imbula (right) represent respectively the highest player fees ever received and paid by Porto.

Highest player fees received by Porto
Rank	Name	Nationality	Fee	Buying club	Date	Ref
1	Otávio	Portugal	€60 million	Al-Nassr (Saudi Arabia)	22 August 2023	
1	Nico González	Spain	€60 million	Manchester City (England)	3 February 2025	
3	Éder Militão	Brazil	€50 million	Real Madrid (Spain)	14 March 2019	
3	Galeno	Brazil	€50 million	Al-Ahli (Saudi Arabia)	31 January 2025	
5	James Rodríguez	Colombia	€45 million (Note: Equivalent to buyout clause value.)	Monaco (France)	24 May 2013	
5	Luís Diaz	Colombia	€45 million	Liverpool (England)	30 January 2022	
7	Vitinha	Portugal	€41.5 million	Paris Saint-Germain (France)	30 June 2022	
8	Hulk	Brazil	€40 million (Note: For 85% of economic rights.)	Zenit Saint Petersburg (Russia)	3 September 2012	
8	Radamel Falcao	Colombia	€40 million	Atlético Madrid (Spain)	18 August 2011	
8	Fábio Silva	Portugal	€40 million	Wolverhampton Wanderers (England)	5 September 2020	

Highest player fees paid by Porto
Rank	Name	Nationality	Fee	Previous club	Date	Ref
1	Samu Aghehowa	Spain	€32 million (Note: An initial €15 million were paid for 50% of economic rights. In May 2025, Porto acquired another 15% for €5 million. In July 2025, the remaining 35% were acquired for €12 million.)	Atlético Madrid (Spain)	23 August 2024	
2	Giannelli Imbula	France	€20 million	Marseille (France)	1 July 2015	
2	Óliver Torres	Spain	€20 million	Atlético Madrid (Spain)	9 February 2017	
2	David Carmo	Angola	€20 million	Braga (Portugal)	5 July 2022	
2	Victor Froholdt	Denmark	€20 million	Copenhagen (Denmark)	23 July 2025	
6	Hulk	Brazil	€19 million	Tokyo Verdy (Japan)	14 May 2011	
7	Pepê	Brazil	€15 million	Grêmio (Brazil)	1 July 2021	
7	Gabri Veiga	Spain	€15 million (Note: For 90% of economic rights.)	Al-Ahli (Saudi Arabia)	5 June 2025	
7	Alberto Costa	Portugal	€15 million	Juventus (Italy)	24 July 2025	
10	João Moutinho	Portugal	€14.175 million (Note: Porto paid €11 million for the total economic rights in July 2010, but sold 37.5% to a third party for €4.125 million in October. In August 2011, Porto purchased back 22.5% for €4 million, and the remaining 15% in January 2013 for €3.3 million.)	Sporting CP (Portugal)	4 July 2010	

== Management ==
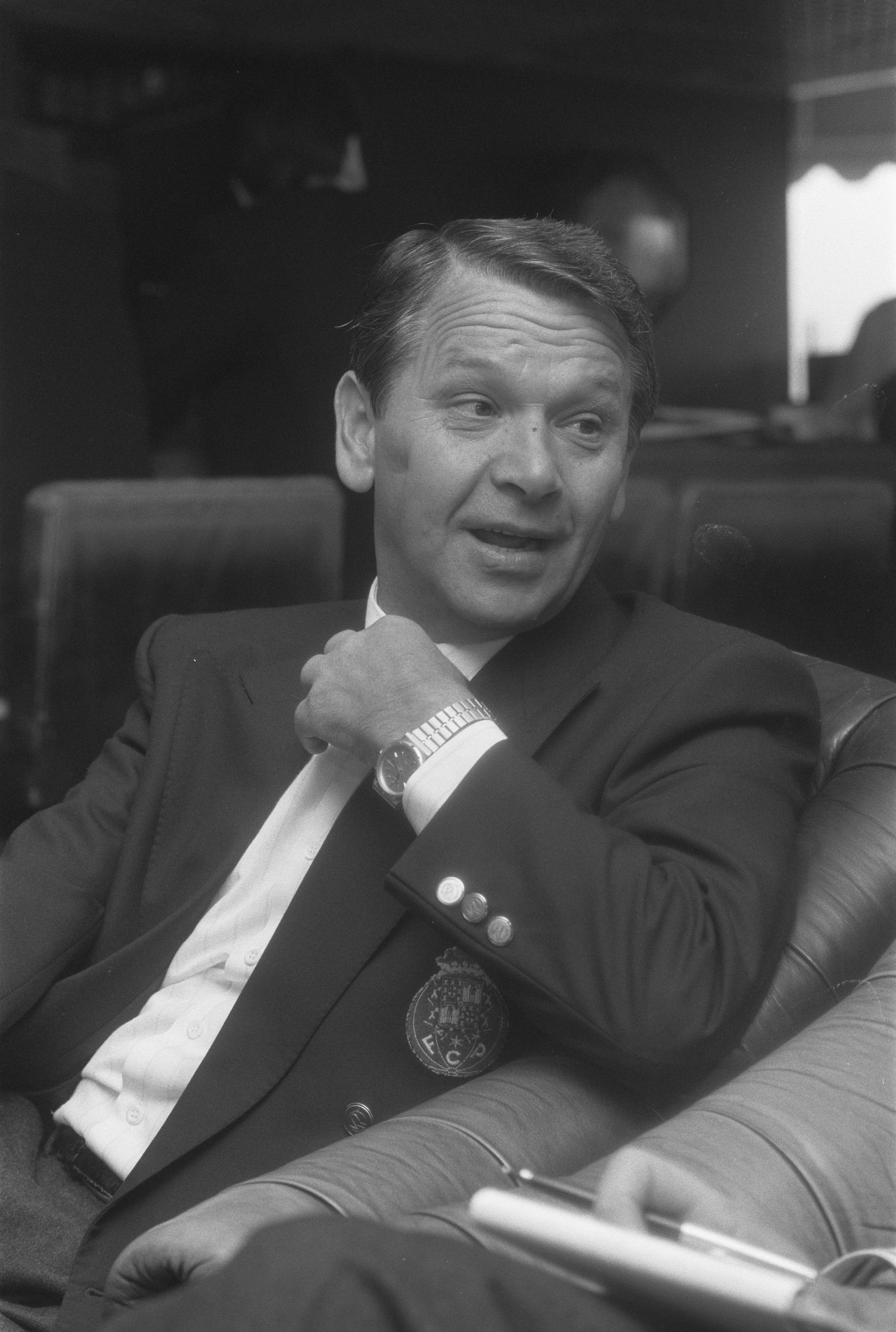
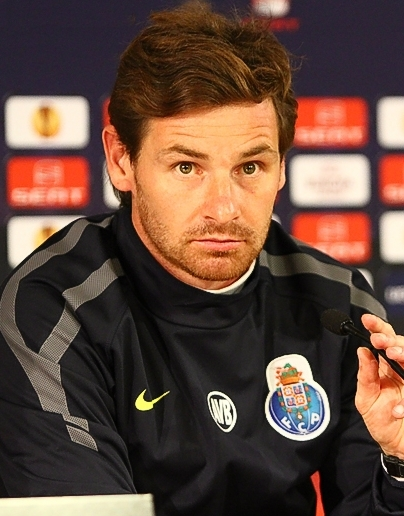
Tomislav Ivić (left) and André Villas-Boas (right) won a club-record four titles in a season.

=== Managers ===
- Most seasons: 9 – José Maria Pedroto (1966–1969, 1976–1980, 1982–1984);
- Most consecutive seasons: 7 – Sérgio Conceição (2017–2024);
- Most matches: 379 – Sérgio Conceição;
- Most matches in international club competitions: 34 – Jesualdo Ferreira;
- Most consecutive home wins: 24 – Artur Jorge;
- Most titles: 11 – Sérgio Conceição;
- Most titles in a season: 4 – Tomislav Ivić (1987–88) and André Villas-Boas (2010–11);
- Most league titles: 3 – Artur Jorge (1984–85, 1985–86, 1989–90), Jesualdo Ferreira (2006–07, 2007–08, 2008–09), and Sérgio Conceição (2017–18, 2019–20, 2021–22);
- Most consecutive league titles: 3 – Jesualdo Ferreira (2006–2009);
- Most Taça de Portugal titles: 4 – Sérgio Conceição (2019–20, 2021–22, 2022–23, 2023–24);
- Most international club competition titles: 2 – José Mourinho and Tomislav Ivić;
- Most doubles: 2 – Sérgio Conceição (Primeira Liga and Taça de Portugal: 2019–20, 2021–22);
- Youngest manager: José Maria Pedroto – 32 years, 4 months and 22 days (against Varzim, 1966–67 Primeira Divisão, 18 Setembro 1966);
- Youngest manager to win a title: André Villas-Boas – 32 years, 9 months and 22 days (2010 Supertaça Cândido de Oliveira, 7 August 2010);
- Youngest manager to win a league title: Miguel Siska – 33 years, 3 months and 19 days (1938–39, 23 April 1939);
- Youngest manager to win an international club competition title: André Villas-Boas – 33 years, 5 months and 11 days (2010–11 UEFA Europa League, 18 May 2011). (Note: Also the youngest coach ever to win a UEFA club competition.)

=== Award winners ===
The following managers have been awarded while representing the club.

UEFA Team of the Year

- (Portugal) José Mourinho – 2003, 2004

== Presidents ==
- Longest-serving president: Jorge Nuno Pinto da Costa – 44 years, since 23 April 1982;
- Most titles: 68 in 87 (78.1%) – Jorge Nuno Pinto da Costa;
  - Most league titles: 23 in 31 (74.1%);
  - Most Taça de Portugal titles: 15 in 20 (75.0%);
  - Most Taça da Liga titles: 1 in 1 (100%);
  - Most Supertaça titles: 22 in 24 (91.6%);
  - Most international club competition titles: 7 in 11 (63.6%).

== Club ==
=== Matches ===
- Most official matches in a season: 58 (2010–11);
- Best league start: 13 wins (1939–40 Primeira Divisão).

==== Firsts ====
- First match: Porto vs. Clube de Aveiro (friendly, 8 October 1893);
- First match against a foreign team: Porto vs. Real Fortuna de Vigo (friendly, 15 December 1907);
- First match in the Campeonato do Porto: Porto 1–2 Boavista (1913–14 Campeonato do Porto, 4 January 1914);
- First match in the Campeonato de Portugal: Porto 2–1 Sporting (1922 Campeonato de Portugal final, 4 June 1922);
- First match in the league: Belenenses 1–1 Porto (1934–35 Primeira Liga, 20 January 1935);
- First match in the Taça de Portugal: Vitória de Guimarães 3–2 Porto (1938–39 Taça de Portugal first round, 14 May 1939);
- First match in the Supertaça: Benfica 2–0 Porto (1981 Supertaça Cândido de Oliveira, first leg, 1 December 1981);
- First match in international club competitions: Porto 1–2 Athletic Bilbao (1956–57 European Cup preliminary round, first leg, 20 September 1956).

==== Wins ====
- Biggest win: 19–1, against Coimbrões (1932–33 Campeonato do Porto, 22 January 1933);
- Biggest win in the Campeonato do Porto: 19–1, against Coimbrões (1932–33 Campeonato do Porto, 22 January 1933);
- Biggest win in the Campeonato de Portugal: 18–0, against Ginásio Lis (1931–32 Campeonato de Portugal first round, 3 April 1932);
- Biggest win in the league: 12–1, against Académico do Porto (1938–39 Primeira Divisão, 16 April 1939) and Carcavelinhos (1941–42 Primeira Divisão);
- Biggest win in the Taça de Portugal: 15–1, against Sanjoanense (1942–43 Taça de Portugal first round, 30 May 1943);
- Biggest win in the Supertaça: 5–0, against Benfica (1996 Supertaça Cândido de Oliveira, second leg, 8 September 1996);
- Biggest win in the Taça da Liga: 4–0, against Rio Ave (2012–13 Taça da Liga semi-finals, 3 April 2013) and Penafiel (2013–14 Taça da Liga third round, 15 January 2014);
- Biggest win in international club competitions: 9–0, against Rabat Ajax (1986–87 European Cup first round, first leg, 17 September 1986);
- Most wins in a season: 49 (2010–11);
- Biggest winning percentage in a season: 84.4% – 49 wins in 58 matches (2010–11);
- Most wins in the league in a season: 31 (1990–91 Primeira Divisão);
- Fewest wins in the league in a season: 5 (1942–43 Primeira Divisão);
- Most wins in international club competitions in a season: 14 in 17 matches (2010–11 UEFA Europa League);
- Most consecutive wins in the league in a season: 16 in 30 matches (2010–11 Primeira Liga);
- Most consecutive away wins in the league in a season: 11 (1984–85, 1996–97, 2008–09);
- Most consecutive wins in international club competitions in a season: 5 in two separate series (2010–11 UEFA Europa League).

==== Defeats ====
- Biggest defeat: 2–12, against Benfica (1942–43 Primeira Divisão, 7 February 1943);
- Biggest defeat in the Campeonato do Porto: 0–4, against Boavista (1945–46 Campeonato do Porto, 23 September 1945);
- Biggest defeat in the Campeonato de Portugal: 0–7, against Benfica (1937–38 Campeonato de Portugal quarter-finals, second leg, 5 June 1938);
- Biggest defeat in the league: 2–12, against Benfica (1942–43 Primeira Divisão, 7 February 1943);
- Biggest defeat in the Taça de Portugal: 0–7, against Vitória de Setúbal (1942–43 Taça de Portugal semi-finals, 13 June 1943);
- Biggest defeat in the Supertaça: 0–3, against Sporting CP (1995 Supertaça Cândido de Oliveira replay, 30 April 1996);
- Biggest defeat in the Taça da Liga: 1–4, against Sporting CP (2008–09 Taça da Liga semi-finals, 4 February 2009);
- Biggest defeat in international club competitions: 1–6, against AEK Athens (1978–79 European Cup first round, first leg, 13 September 1978) and Bayern Munich (2014–15 UEFA Champions League quarter-finals, second leg, 21 April 2015);, 0–5, against Liverpool (2017–18 UEFA Champions League round of 16, 14 February 2018)
- Most defeats in the league in a season: 12 (1949–50 and 1969–70 Primeira Divisão);
- Fewest defeats in the league in a season: none, in 2010–11 (30 matches, 27 wins and 3 draws) and 2012–13 (30 matches, 24 wins and 6 draws);
- Most consecutive home matches without defeats: 45 (from 25 October 2008 to 2 January 2011);
- Most consecutive home matches without defeats in the league: 119 (from 3 January 1982 to 16 April 1989);
- Most consecutive matches without defeats in the league: 55 (from 28 February 2010 to 29 January 2012).

=== Goals ===
- First goal scored in the Campeonato de Portugal: José Tavares Bastos, against Sporting CP (1922 Campeonato de Portugal final, 4 June 1922);
- First goal scored in the league: Carlos Nunes, against Belenenses (1934–35 Primeira Liga, 20 January 1935);
- First goal scored in the Taça de Portugal: Carlos Nunes, against Vitória de Guimarães (1938–39 Taça de Portugal first round, first leg, 14 May 1939);
- First goal scored in the Supertaça: Jacques Pereira, against Benfica (1981 Supertaça Cândido de Oliveira, second leg, 8 December 1981);
- First goal scored in the Taça da Liga: Ernesto Farías, against Vitória de Setúbal (2008–09 Taça da Liga third round, 8 January 2009);
- First goal scored in international club competitions: José Maria, against Athletic Bilbao (1956–57 European Cup preliminary round, first leg, 20 September 1956);
- Most goals scored in the league in a season: 88 (1987–88 Primeira Divisão);
- Fewest goals scored in the league in a season: 30 (1969–70 Primeira Divisão);
- Most goals conceded in the league in a season: 56 (1942–43 Primeira Divisão);
- Fewest goals conceded in the league in a season: 9 (1979–80 and 1983–84 Primeira Divisão);
- Highest goal difference in the league: +73, 88–15 (1987–88 Primeira Divisão);
- Lowest goal difference in the league: −16, 40–56 (1942–43 Primeira Divisão);
- Most goals scored in international club competitions in a season: 44 in 17 matches (2010–11 UEFA Europa League);
- Most minutes without conceding goals in the league: 1,191 (1991–92 Primeira Divisão, from matchday 4 to matchday 17);
- Most consecutive matches in the league scoring goals: 43 (6 March 2010 – 18 September 2011).

=== Points ===
- Most points in a season:
  - Two points for a win: 67 in 38 matches (1990–91 Primeira Divisão);
  - Three points for a win: 91 in 34 matches (2021–22 Primeira Liga) – record.
- Fewest points in a season:
  - Two points for a win: 14 in 14 matches (1936–37 Primeira Liga, 1942–43 Primeira Divisão);
  - Three points for a win: 61 in 30 matches (2013–14 Primeira Liga).
- Biggest distance in points to runners-up:
  - Two points for a win: 15 (1987–88 Primeira Divisão);
  - Three points for a win: 21 (2010–11 Primeira Liga).

=== Stadiums ===
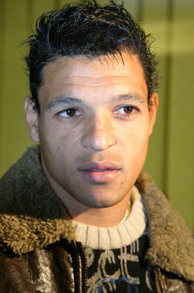
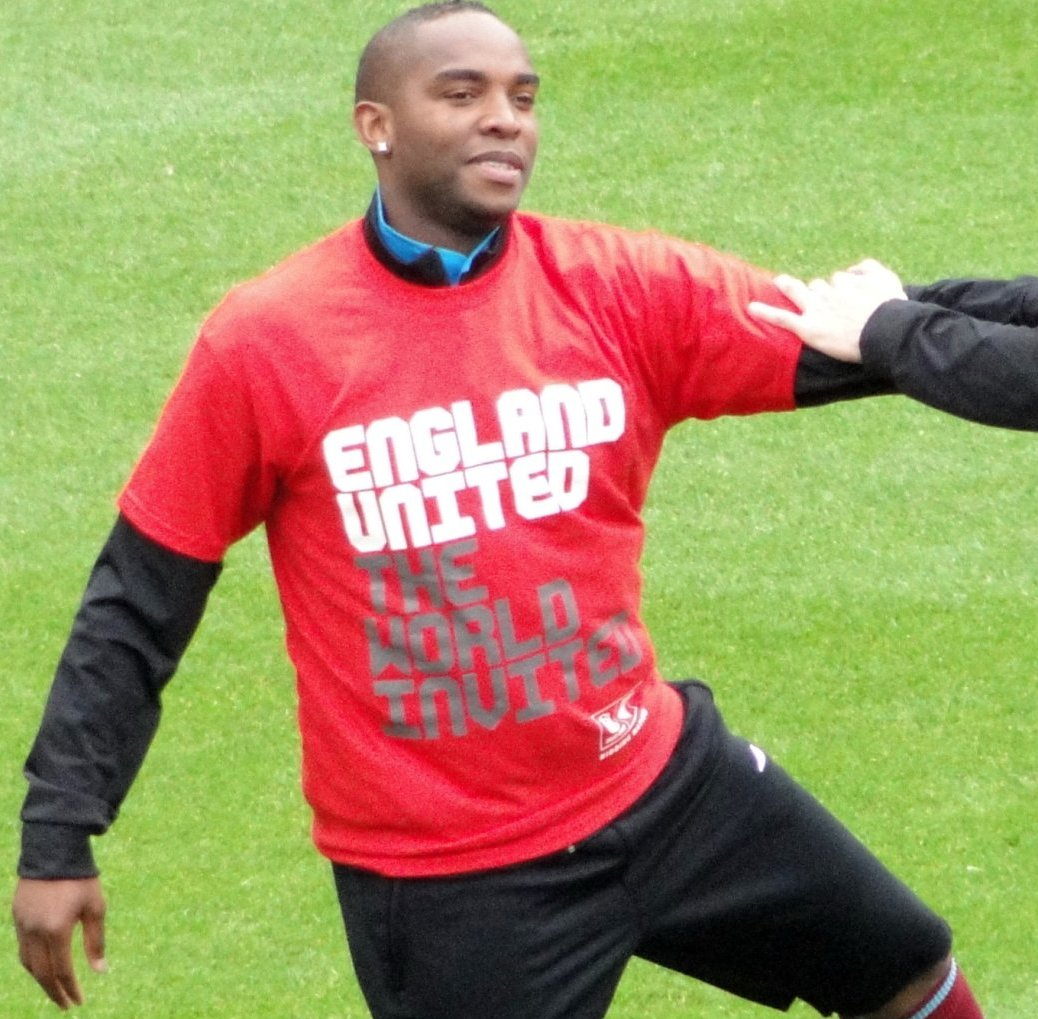
Derlei (left) scored the first goal at the Estádio do Dragão in November 2003, while Benni McCarthy (right) netted the last one at the old Estádio das Antas in January 2004.
- Estádio das Antas (1952–2004):
  - First match: Porto 2–8 Benfica (friendly, 28 May 1952);
  - First goal: Vital, against Benfica (friendly, 28 May 1952);
  - Last match: Porto 2–0 Estrela da Amadora (2003–04 Primeira Liga, 24 January 2004);
  - Last goal: Benni McCarthy, against Estrela da Amadora (2003–04 Primeira Liga matchday 19, 24 January 2004);
  - Highest attendance: 90,000, against Dynamo Kiev (1986–87 European Cup, 8 April 1987).
- Estádio do Dragão (2003–present):
  - First match: Porto 2–0 Barcelona (friendly, 16 November 2003);
  - First goal: Derlei, against Barcelona (friendly, 16 November 2003);
  - Highest attendance: 52,000, against Barcelona (friendly, 16 November 2003);
  - Highest attendance in an official match: 50,818, against Deportivo La Coruña (2003–04 UEFA Champions League semi-finals, first leg, 21 April 2004).

== Bibliography ==
- Bandeira, João Pedro (2012). Bíblia do FC Porto (in Portuguese). Lisbon: Prime Books. ISBN 9789896550943. OCLC 854993887.
- Tovar, Rui Miguel (2011). Almanaque do FC Porto 1893–2011 (in Portuguese). Alfragide: Caderno. ISBN 9789892315430.
