= Michael Walsh =

Michael Walsh may refer to:

== Politicians and military ==
- Michael Walsh (British Army officer) (1927–2015), British Army major-general
- Michael Walsh (Medal of Honor) (1858–1913), chief machinist serving in the U.S. Navy and Medal of Honor recipient
- Michael F. Walsh (1894–1956), secretary of state of New York 1939–1943
- Michael James Walsh (1858–1933), Canadian politician
- Michael Walsh (New York politician) (1810–1859), U.S. representative from New York
- Michael P. Walsh (politician) (1838–1919), American labor union activist and member of the Wisconsin State Assembly

== Footballers ==
- Mickey Walsh (born 1954), football striker
- Michael Walsh (footballer, born 1977), English football (soccer) player
- Michael Walsh (footballer, born 1986), English football (soccer) player for Chester City

== Hurlers ==
- Michael Walsh (Kilkenny hurler) (born 1961), goalkeeper for Kilkenny
- Michael Walsh (Waterford hurler) (born 1983), Waterford player
- Michael Walsh (London hurler) (born 1986), Irish hurler
- Michael Walsh (Young Irelands hurler) (fl. 2015), Irish hurler for Kilkenny
- Mick Walsh (1934–2013), Irish hurler

== Other people ==
- Michael G. Walsh (1906–1993), Irish steeplechase trainer
- M. Emmet Walsh (1935-2024), American actor
- Michael Walsh, pen name of Michael McLaughlin (born 1940), British far-right activist
- Michael Walsh (engineer) (born 1943), American vehicle emissions engineer
- Michael Walsh (film critic) (1945–2024), Canadian film critic and print journalist
- Michael Walsh (author) (born 1949), American music critic, author and screenwriter
- Michael Walsh (publisher) (fl. since 1960s), of Old Earth Books
- Michael J. Walsh (fl. since 2003), American designer and creative director
- Michael P. Walsh (Jesuit) (1912–1982), American Jesuit and academic administrator
- Mikey Walsh (1980-), British writer

== See also ==
- Mike Walsh (disambiguation)
- Michael Welsh (disambiguation)
- Michael P. Walsh (disambiguation)
