= Michael P. Walsh =

Michael P. Walsh may refer to:

- Michael Walsh (engineer) (born 1943), American vehicle emissions engineer
- Michael P. Walsh (Jesuit) (1912–1982), American Jesuit and academic administrator
- Michael P. Walsh (politician) (1838–1919), American labor union activist and member of the Wisconsin State Assembly

== See also ==
- Michael Walsh (disambiguation)
- Mike Walsh (disambiguation)
