= Gomes (disambiguation) =

Gomes is a surname. It may also refer to:

== People ==
- Gomes (footballer, born 1956), Brazilian footballer Édson Gomes Bonifácio
- Gomes da Costa (footballer) (1919–1987), Portuguese former footballer
- Gomes Echigues (1010–1065), medieval knight, lord of Felgueiras and governor of the District of Entre-Douro-e-Minho
- Gomes Jardim (1773–1854), Brazilian farmer, freemason, medical doctor, militant and president of the Riograndense Republic
- Gomes de Sequeira, 16th century Portuguese explorer
- Gomes Eanes de Zurara (c. 1410–1474), Portuguese chronicler

== Other uses ==
- 17856 Gomes, an asteroid
