= Nélson Pereira =

Portuguese footballer

Nélson
Personal information
- Full name: Nélson Alexandre Gomes Pereira
- Date of birth: 20 October 1975 (age 51)
- Place of birth: Torres Vedras, Portugal
- Height: 1.87 m (6 ft 2 in)
- Position: Goalkeeper

Youth career
- 1986–1994: Torreense

Senior career*
Years	Team	Apps	(Gls)
1994–1997	Torreense	65	(0)
1997–2006	Sporting CP	61	(0)
2006–2007	Vitória Setúbal	8	(0)
2007–2009	Estrela Amadora	53	(0)
2009–2010	Belenenses	13	(0)
Total		200	(0)

International career
2000–2002	Portugal B	3	(0)
2002	Portugal	3	(0)
- * Club domestic league appearances and goals

Nélson Alexandre Gomes Pereira, known simply as Nélson (Portuguese pronunciation: [ˈnɛlsõ], born 20 October 1975), is a Portuguese former professional footballer who played as a goalkeeper.

== Club career ==
Nélson was born in Torres Vedras, Lisbon District. He started his football career with his hometown team S.C.U. Torreense, and was primarily used as a backup at Sporting CP, first to Peter Schmeichel then to Ricardo, for nearly a decade. His best output for the Lions came in the 2002–03 season, between Schmeichel's departure from the Estádio José Alvalade and Ricardo's arrival, playing 19 Primeira Liga matches in an eventual third-place finish, 27 points behind champions FC Porto.

After 2005–06, Nélson moved to Vitória FC, but due to unpaid wages – a recurring problem prior to his arrival – he left the sadinos, being out of work for almost six months before joining another Lisbon side, C.F. Estrela da Amadora, in July 2007.

Estrela would be relegated at the end of the 2008–09 campaign after continuing financial problems, even though they finished in mid-table, and Nélson subsequently moved to neighbours C.F. Os Belenenses. He suffered an injury in training in December 2009, and never played again as the Estádio do Restelo side finished second-bottom and dropped down a tier; aged 34, he chose to retire, but returned to his main club Sporting the following year as goalkeeping coach.

Nélson left his position in July 2021.

== International career ==
Nélson was capped three times for Portugal, all in 2002, making his debut on 27 March in a 4–1 friendly loss to Finland in Porto; he came on as a half-time substitute and conceded the last goal. After Quim was sent home for failing a drugs test, he was picked as third-choice for that year's FIFA World Cup.

== Honours ==
Sporting CP

- Primeira Liga: 1999–2000, 2001–02
- Taça de Portugal: 2001–02
