= Carlos Nunes =

Portuguese footballer

Personal information
- Full name: Carlos Ferreira da Silva Nunes
- Date of birth: 20 December 1914
- Place of birth: Portugal
- Date of death: Unknown
- Position: Midfielder

Senior career*
Years	Team	Apps	(Gls)
1932–1942	Porto	178	(129)

International career
1935–1936	Portugal	3	(1)

Managerial career
- 1947: Porto
- * Club domestic league appearances and goals

Carlos Ferreira da Silva Nunes (born 20 December 1914, date of death unknown) was a Portuguese footballer who played for FC Porto and the Portugal national team, as midfielder. Nunes made his international debut in a 3-3 draw against Spain 5 May 1935 in Lisbon and gained 3 caps and scored 1 goal for the national team.

== Honours ==
Porto

- Primeira Liga: 1934–35, 1938–39, 1939–40
- Campeonato de Portugal: 1936–37
- Campeonato do Porto: 1932–33, 1933–34, 1934–35, 1935–36, 1936–37, 1937–38, 1938–39, 1940–41
