= Artur Pinga =

Portuguese footballer (1909–1963)

Pinga
Personal information
- Full name: Artur de Sousa
- Date of birth: 30 July 1909
- Place of birth: Funchal, Portugal
- Date of death: 12 July 1963 (aged 53)
- Place of death: Porto, Portugal
- Position: Forward

Youth career
- Marítimo

Senior career*
Years	Team	Apps	(Gls)
1929–1930	Marítimo	2	(0)
1930–1946	Porto	301	(287)

International career
1930–1942	Portugal	21	(9)

Managerial career
- 1948–1949: Tirsense
- 1949–1950: Porto
- Sanjoanense
- Gouveia
- –1963: Porto youth team
- * Club domestic league appearances and goals

Artur de Sousa, known by his nickname Pinga (30 July 1909 – 12 July 1963) was a Portuguese footballer and later coach who made his name at FC Porto, where he served until his death in 1963.

== Club career ==
Pinga played as forward or inside left and achieved nationwide fame at CS Marítimo. In 1930 he earned his first call-up to the national team, and in the same year joined FC Porto, and became the key player of the victories in the Campeonato de Portugal (the predecessor to the Cup of Portugal), in 1931–32 and 1936–37. He was still a playing for Porto when the forerunner of the current Primeira Liga was established, where he was champion in the first two years of the competition, in 1938–39 and 1939–40.

He retired in 1946 after a meniscus surgery, when such operations still carried many risks. During his career he was considered the best national player ever, scoring 394 goals in 400 games. He only played for two clubs, Marítimo and FC Porto.

== International career ==
He was capped 21 times for Portugal, scoring 9 goals over 12 years (1930–1942). On 5 May 1935, Pinga scored two late goals against Spain to complete an iconic comeback, from 3-0 down up to 3-3. On 16 March 1941, he scored his last international goal against Spain in a 5-1 loss.

== Coaching career ==
In his first season as a football manager, he caused a massive upset when Tirsense knocked out Sporting in the Portuguese Cup. He then managed Sanjoanense and Gouveia before returning to FC Porto as assistant manager.

He died in 1963, while serving as a youth team coach in Porto.

== Legacy ==
He was idolized by José Maria Pedroto, who would become another major star in the Porto side. Both had their name suggested to the Estádio do Dragão. One of the most important sportsmen born in the Madeira Islands (some say his legacy lives on modern star Cristiano Ronaldo), he has a street named after him in his hometown Funchal.

== Career statistics ==
Portugal score listed first, score column indicates score after each Pinga goal.

List of international goals scored by Pinga
No.	Date	Venue	Opponent	Score	Result	Competition
1	31 May 1931	Estádio do Lumiar, Lisbon, Portugal	Belgium	3–2	3–2	Friendly
2	3 May 1932	Estádio do Lumiar, Lisbon, Portugal	Yugoslavia	1–0	3–2	Friendly
3	29 January 1933	Estádio do Lumiar, Lisbon, Portugal	Hungary	1–0	1–0	Friendly
4	5 May 1935	Estádio do Lumiar, Lisbon, Portugal	Spain	2–3	3–3	Friendly
5	5 May 1935	Estádio do Lumiar, Lisbon, Portugal	Spain	3–3	3–3	Friendly
6	28 November 1937	Estadio Municipal de Balaídos, Vigo, Spain	Spain Nationalist	1–0	2–1	Friendly
7	30 January 1938	Campo das Salésias, Lisbon, Portugal	Spain Nationalist	1–0	1–0	Friendly
8	24 April 1938	Waldstadion, Frankfurt, Germany	Germany	1–0	1–1	Friendly
9	16 March 1941	San Mamés Stadium, Bilbao, Spain	Spain	1–3	1–5	Friendly

== Honours ==
Porto

- Primeira Liga: 1934–35, 1938–39, 1939–40
- Campeonato de Portugal: 1931–32, 1936–37

Individual

- Bola de Prata: 1935–36
