= 2011 Taça de Portugal final =

- Event: 2010–11 Taça de Portugal
Vitória de Guimarães	Porto
2	6
- Date: 22 May 2011
- Venue: Estádio Nacional, Oeiras
- Man of the Match: James Rodríguez (Porto)
- Referee: João Ferreira (Setúbal)
- Attendance: 35,000

The 2011 Taça de Portugal final was the final match of the 2010–11 Taça de Portugal, the 71st season of the Taça de Portugal, the premier Portuguese football cup competition organized by the Portuguese Football Federation (FPF). The match was played on 22 May 2011 at the Estádio Nacional in Oeiras, and opposed Porto and Vitória de Guimarães. Porto defeated Vitória de Guimarães 6–2. A man of the match performance by Colombian winger James Rodríguez who scored a hat-trick, helped his side raise the club's tally to 16 trophies in this competition. The eight goals in the final provided the highest scoring final since the 1964 final, when Porto were defeated by Benfica by the same score. In Portugal, the final was televised live in HD on RTP1 and Sport TV.

As Porto already qualified for the 2011–12 UEFA Champions League as domestic title holders, Vitória de Guimarães qualified for the 2011–12 UEFA Europa League as cup runners-up. The Vimaranenses also qualified for the 2011 Supertaça Cândido de Oliveira, where they took on their cup opponents at the Estádio Municipal de Aveiro.

== Background ==
Porto were appearing in their twenty eighth Taça de Portugal final. Porto went into the match as 15-time winners (1956, 1958, 1968, 1977, 1984, 1988, 1991, 1994, 1998, 2000, 2001, 2003, 2006, 2009, 2010). Of their 27 Taça de Portugal final appearances, they had lost 12 times (1953, 1959, 1961, 1964, 1978, 1980, 1981, 1983, 1985, 1992, 2004, 2008). Porto's last Taça de Portugal final appearance was in 2008, against Sporting CP. The Leões defeated the Dragões 2–0 thanks to two goals in extra-time from Rodrigo Tiuí. Vitória de Guimarães were appearing in their fifth Taça de Portugal final. They had previously lost all four finals (1942, 1963, 1976, 1988). The Vimaranenses last Taça de Portugal final appearance was in 1988, where Vitória de Guimarães lost 1–0 to their cup final opponents.

In Porto's and Vitória de Guimarães's entire history, the two teams had met on 147 different occasions. Porto had accumulated 91 victories whilst Vitória de Guimarães had accumulated 22 victories. Of those 147 encounters, 34 of those games had ended in a tie. The last meeting between these two sides in this competition was a fourth round tie in the 2004–05 edition, where the Conquistadores defeated Porto 2–1 at the Estádio D. Afonso Henriques. The last meeting between these two sides, prior to this encounter was a domestic league match, which took place on 5 March. Porto defeated their opponents 2–0 at the Estádio do Dragão.

== Route to the final ==
=== Porto ===
Round	Opponents	Score
3	Limianos (H)	4–1
4	Moreirense (A)	0–1
5	Juventude de Évora (H)	4–0
QF	Pinhalnovense (H)	2–0
SF	Benfica (H)	0–2
SF	Benfica (A)	1–3 (a)

As a Primeira Liga team, Porto entered the 2010–11 Taça de Portugal in the third round, where they were drawn in a home tie against Terceira Divisão side Limianos. Despite Porto manager André Villas-Boas making seven changes to the starting eleven, the Dragões comfortably defeated the fourth division side. A hat trick by Brazilian striker Walter and first half strike from Silvestre Varela provided Porto with safe passage to the fourth round. Liga de Honra side Moreirense were Porto's opponents in the fourth round. The match which took place at the Parque de Jogos Comendador Joaquim de Almeida Freitas, saw Porto defeat the side from Moreira de Cónegos, 1–0. Despite Moreirense being a Liga de Honra side, Porto found it difficult to break Jorge Casquilha's side who played every player behind the ball and looked to capitalize on Porto's defensive mistakes. Porto broke the deadlock on 74 minutes through Colombian striker Radamel Falcao. The goal came about after Fernando Belluschi's long range strike was saved on to the bar by Moreirense's keeper Roberto Tigrão, and Falcao was quickest to react to the ball than Édson to fire the ball into the net to send his side to the next round.

Porto were drawn to play at home against Juventude de Évora in the fifth round. Despite Juventude de Évora being a third division side, André Villas-Boas opted for a strong starting line-up with first team regulars Álvaro Pereira and Radamel Falcao being selected ahead of players like Emídio Rafael, Ukra and Walter, all of whom had primarily been used by Villas-Boas for cup games. Villas-Boas' strong starting eleven would pay off as Porto would comfortably defeat the opposition 4–0, with goals from Pereira, João Moutinho, Falcao and Walter. For the quarter finals, Porto were drawn in another home tie with the Portistas facing third division side Pinhalnovense. A brace from Hulk near the end of the match sealed a 2–0 win.

For the semi-finals, Porto were drawn against rivals Benfica. The semi-finals were contested over two legs with the first leg taking place at Porto's Estádio do Dragão. Porto went into the game as favorites as they had already beaten the Encarnados on two occasions during the 2010–11 season. In the first leg match, Jorge Jesus' Benfica defeated the Azuis e Brancos 2–0. The first goal of the game came on six minutes through left back Fábio Coentrão. Javier Saviola received the ball in middle of the park and played a forward pass to an onrushing Coentrão, who beat Maicon to the ball, and fired his shot through Helton's legs to give the visitors the lead. Benfica's second came twenty minutes later through midfield ace Javi García. A Benfica counterattack saw Nicolás Gaitán play a forward ball to Coentrão, who crossed the ball into the box which was cleared by Porto's defense but fell to García, who from 25 yards curled a shot to Helton's right hand side which bounced in front of the Brazilian 'keeper and into the goal which would double Benfica's lead and take a two-goal advantage back to the Estádio da Luz for the second leg. In the second leg, Porto were able to overcome the 2–0 deficit to claim a 3–1 win over the Encarnados to send them through to a fourth consecutive cup final. Despite a late Óscar Cardozo goal, Porto's second half goals from João Moutinho, Hulk and Radamel Falcao were sufficient for the Portistas to progress on to the away goals rule.

=== Vitória de Guimarães ===
Round	Opponents	Score
3	Malveira (H)	4–0
4	Portimonense (A)	1–2
5	Torreense (H)	2–0
QF	Merelinense (A)	0–2
SF	Académica de Coimbra (H)	1–0
SF	Académica de Coimbra (A)	0–0

Just like their opponents, Vitória de Guimarães entered the 2010–11 Taça de Portugal in the third round, where they were drawn in a home tie against third division side Malveira. Goals from Edgar, João Ribeiro, Maranhão and Marcelo Toscano saw Vitória comfortably defeat the fourth division side to grant them passage to the next round. Liga de Honra side Portimonense were Vitória de Guimarães' opponents in the fourth round. Despite Vitória's coach Manuel Machado selecting a strong line up for the fourth round tie against the Alvinegros, the Vimaranenses encountered several difficulties against the Liga de Honra side. The match which took place at the Estádio Algarve saw Portimonense score first, through Renatinho. Vitória went in at the break trailing. Following the restart, the introduction of Rui Miguel for João Alves proved to be game changing as the visitors would score on 49 minutes, after Bruno Teles' free kick was saved by Portimonense's Hugo Ventura in which João Paulo followed by Ventura's save to equalize for his side. On 89 minutes, the game looked destine to go to extra-time but Edgar's late header provided the winner to settle the tie.

Vitória de Guimarães played host to Torreense at the Estádio D. Afonso Henriques in the fifth round. Goals in either half from Edgar and Marcelo Toscano saw Os Conquistadores see off the third division. For the quarter-finals, Vitória de Guimarães faced another third division side, Merelinense. The match took place at the Estádio 1º de Maio in Braga as the club from São Pedro de Merelim wanted to play the cup tie in a bigger seated stadium than their home ground of the Estádio João Soares Vieira which only had a seating capacity of 5,000. The tie was settled within the first half. Brazilian striker Edgar would score the first goal of the game on 30 minutes and fourth of the campaign. A right wing cross from full-back Alex would find Edgar to score Vitória's first goal of the match. Vitória's second would come before the interval. A corner taken by João Ribeiro would find an unmarked Cléber who would double his side's lead and thus grant Vitória passage to the semi-finals.

For the semi-finals, Vitória de Guimarães were drawn against fellow Primeira Liga side Académica de Coimbra. The semi-finals were played over two legs with the first leg taking place at the Estádio D. Afonso Henriques. Played in front of a crowd of 8,980, just under one third of the Estádio D. Afonso Henriques' seating capacity, an 80th-minute goal from Faouzi Abdelghani saw the home side take a narrow lead back to Coimbra. The second leg which took place at the Estádio Cidade de Coimbra proved to be a dull encounter, as both sides did not take many attacking risks and decided to sit back and wait for their opponent to make a mistake in order to capitalize on it. The best goal scoring opportunity of the game fell to Vitória's Tiago Targino who missed the chance to put his side ahead on 34 minutes. As the game drew to a close, the home side needed a goal to send the tie to extra-time and therefore piled on the pressure. Académica coach Ulisses Morais brought on forward players Enrique Carreño and Ibrahim Sissoko but to no effect as the Estudantes were unable to score which resulted in the match finishing goalless and Vitória progressing to the cup final for the fifth time in their history. The 0–0 result marked the fifth clean sheet that Vitória had picked up during the cup campaign.

== Pre-match ==
=== Officials ===
Match officials were confirmed on 17 May by the Portuguese Football Federation. João Ferreira of Setúbal was named the referee for the final. This was the first time that Ferreira had officiated a final of the Taça de Portugal. Ferreira was assisted by Pais António and Luís Ramos of Setúbal, whilst the fourth official was Elmano Santos of Madeira.

=== Ticketing ===
Tickets for the final went on sale on 14 May. The Portuguese Football Federation (FPF) allocated tickets for both finalist clubs varying in price between of €10 and €30, and allocated 12,500 tickets to both finalists clubs. The FPF allocated an additional 4,500 tickets to Vitória de Guimarães due to the club selling their share of the tickets fairly quickly.

== Match ==
=== Team selection ===
Unlike their opponents, Porto had less time to prepare for the cup final due to its participation in the 2011 UEFA Europa League final. Porto manager André Villas-Boas selected a squad of eighteen players to take to the Jamor. Villas-Boas left out center back Nicolás Otamendi and Colombian striker Radamel Falcao who played in the Europa League final four days prior to the cup final. Despite leaving him out in the Europa League final, Villas-Boas included midfielder Mariano González in his cup final squad. González prior to the cup final, announced that he would leave the Dragões following the cup final. The Portistas lined up in a 4–5–1 formation. Villas-Boas opted to rest several key players who had played in the Europa League final four days earlier, and lined up with several fringe players. This was the case for goalkeeper Beto, who replaced Helton, and for James Rodríguez, who replaced Falcao. The inclusion of Rodríguez, who started on the left wing, saw Hulk play in the center forward role as a replacement for the absent Falcao.

Vitória de Guimarães went into the cup final with no major injury doubts to any of its players. Vitória striker Marcelo Toscano was a doubt going into the game, but recovered in time to be selected by manager Manuel Machado. The Vimaranenses lined up in a 4–5–1 formation. In Vitória's starting line-up, Machado opted to start Freire ahead of Mahamadou N'Diaye, and leave forward Marcelo Toscano on the bench for Faouzi Abdelghani, who would comprise Vitória's five men midfield. Manuel Machado would also start Edgar as Vitória's lone striker.

=== Summary ===
The game opened with goal from James Rodríguez on two minutes. The goal came about after Hulk received the ball in Vitória's penalty area and played it to Fernando Belluschi who took a shot from the outside of the box which deflected off a Vitória player and would fall into the path of James Rodríguez who would fire the ball past an on rushing Nilson from six yards out. Vitória de Guimarães equalized on twenty minutes after an Anderson Santana free kick deflected off Porto's Rolando, and fell into the path of Álvaro Pereira who was unable to direct the ball off the goal line and headed it into his own goal. Porto took the lead a minute later after James Rodríguez picked out an unmarked Silvestre Varela who volleyed the ball past Nilson to make 2–1 to the Dragões. Os Vimaranenses equalized two minutes later after another Anderson Santana set piece found an on rushing Edgar rise above the Porto defense and head past Beto to make 2–2. The Azuis e Brancos took the lead for a third time on 35 minutes through Rolando. The goal came about after a Porto set piece found Maicon who headed the ball against the bar, and Rolando followed up Maicon's header to tap in the ball into an empty net.

Porto's fourth goal came on 42 minutes after Hulk scored directly from a corner kick. On the verge of half time, Vitória were awarded a penalty. Vitória's Edgar stepped up and fired the ball to his left hand side in which Porto's keeper Beto got a hand to it to keep it out and avoid Vitória scoring their third goal of the game. Porto's fifth came one minute after Beto's penalty save as a quick Porto counterattack saw Hulk beat a Vitória player and play a through ball to an on rushing James Rodríguez to score his second goal of the game. Both sides would go into the break with Porto leading 5–2. The second half proved to be less entertaining than the first as the intensity dropped for both sides and there would be less goal scoring opportunities. The only goal of the second half would come on 73 minutes through James Rodríguez, who would score his third and Porto's sixth of the game. Porto's Taça de Portugal victory would complete an impressive four trophies in one season for the Azuis e Brancos, and would tie the club with Benfica with the same number of trophies.

=== Details ===
22 May 2011
17:00 UTC+1

Vitória de Guimarães	2–6	Porto
Pereira 20' (o.g.); Edgar 23'		Rodríguez 2', 45+2', 73'; Varela 21'; Rolando 35'; Hulk 42'

Estádio Nacional, Oeiras
Attendance: 35,000
Referee: João Ferreira (Setúbal)

Vitória de Guimarães	Porto

GK	1	(Brazil) Nilson
RB	2	(Brazil) Freire
CB	40	(Portugal) João Paulo
CB	79	(Portugal) Alex (c)
LB	33	(Brazil) Anderson
DM	11	(Brazil) Renan	(substituted off) 46'
DM	28	(Brazil) Cléber	(substituted off) 56'
CM	10	(Portugal) Rui Miguel
RW	7	(Portugal) Tiago Targino	(substituted off) 58'
LW	20	(Morocco) Faouzi Abdelghni
CF	29	(Brazil) Edgar
Substitutes:
GK	83	(Brazil) Douglas
MF	25	(Portugal) João Ribeiro
MF	26	(Portugal) Flávio Meireles
CM	80	(Portugal) João Alves	(substituted on) 46'
CB	44	(Mali) Mahamadou Ndiaye
MF	90	(Brazil) Marcelo Toscano	(substituted on) 58'
CM	14	(Portugal) Jorge Ribeiro	(substituted on) 56'
Manager:
(Portugal) Manuel Machado

GK	24	(Portugal) Beto
RB	21	(Romania) Cristian Săpunaru
CB	4	(Brazil) Maicon
CB	14	(Portugal) Rolando
LB	5	(Uruguay) Álvaro Pereira
DM	25	(Brazil) Fernando	(yellow card) 45'	(substituted off) 46'
CM	7	(Argentina) Fernando Belluschi		(substituted off) 63'
CM	8	(Portugal) João Moutinho
AM	19	(Colombia) James Rodríguez
FW	17	(Portugal) Silvestre Varela		(substituted off) 76'
FW	12	(Brazil) Hulk (c)	(yellow card) 30'
Substitutes:
GK	1	(Brazil) Helton
CB	16	(Portugal) Henrique Sereno
DM	23	(Brazil) Souza	(yellow card) 74'	(substituted on) 63'
CM	6	(Colombia) Fredy Guarín		(substituted on) 46'
CM	28	(Portugal) Rúben Micael
WF	11	(Argentina) Mariano González		(substituted on) 76'
CF	18	(Brazil) Walter
Manager:
(Portugal) André Villas-Boas

2010–11 Taça de Portugal Winners
Porto
16th Title

Man of the match

- (Colombia) James Rodríguez (Porto)

Match officials

- Assistant referees:
  - Pais António (Setúbal)
  - Luís Ramos (Setúbal)
- Fourth official: Elmano Santos (Madeira)

Match rules

- 90 minutes
- Penalty shoot-out if scores level after 90 minutes
- Seven named substitutes
- Maximum of three substitutions

== See also ==
- 2010–11 FC Porto season
- 2011 Taça da Liga final
