= Mike Walsh =

Mike Walsh may refer to:

- Mike Walsh (TV host) (born 1938), host of the Australian television program The Mike Walsh Show
- Mike Walsh (footballer) (born 1956), football defender
- Mike Walsh (ice hockey) (born 1962), former National Hockey League ice hockey player for the New York Islanders
- Mike Walsh (umpire) (1850–1929), baseball umpire and manager
- Mike Walsh (politician), American politician
- Mikey Walsh (born 1980), British writer and columnist

== See also ==
- Michael Walsh (disambiguation)
