= Manoel (footballer, born 1953) =

Brazilian footballer

Personal information
- Full name: Manoel da Silva Costa
- Date of birth: 14 February 1953
- Place of birth: Uruguaiana, Brazil
- Date of death: 17 October 2015 (aged 62)
- Height: 1.87 m (6 ft 2 in)
- Position: Forward

Senior career*
Years	Team	Apps	(Gls)
1972–1973	America	26	(2)
1974–1975	Internacional	25	(7)
1976–1981	Sporting CP	117	(42)
1981–1982	Portimonense	21	(1)
1982–1983	Braga	17	(5)
1983–1985	Académico de Viseu		
1985–1988	Amora		
1988–1989	Almancilense		
1989–1990	Loures		
1990–1991	Odivelas		

International career
1972	Brazil Olympic	3	(0)
- * Club domestic league appearances and goals

Manoel da Silva Costa, known as Manoel (14 February 1953 – 17 October 2015) was a Brazilian footballer who played as a forward. He competed in the men's tournament at the 1972 Summer Olympics.
