= Joaquim Machado =

Portuguese footballer (1923–2015)

Personal information
- Date of birth: 20 February 1923
- Place of birth: Portugal
- Date of death: 13 February 2015 (aged 91)
- Position: Midfielder

Senior career*
Years	Team	Apps	(Gls)
1945–1955	Porto	218	(23)

International career
1948–1952	Portugal	2	(0)
- * Club domestic league appearances and goals

Joaquim Machado (20 February 1923 – 13 February 2015) was a Portuguese footballer who played as a midfielder. He died in February 2015 at the age of 91.

== See also ==
- List of one-club men
