= Bernardo da Velha =

Portuguese footballer

Personal information
- Full name: Bernardo Oliveira da Velha
- Date of birth: 29 January 1942 (age 84)
- Place of birth: Portuguese Guinea
- Position: Defender

Youth career
- 1962–1963: Sporting Lisboa

Senior career*
Years	Team	Apps	(Gls)
1964–1969	Porto	54	(11)
1969–1971	Vitória	30	(2)
1971–1974	Boavista	57	(0)
1974–1975	Espinho	20	(2)
1975–1976	Leixões		
1978–1981	Toronto First Portuguese		

Managerial career
- 1981: Toronto First Portuguese
- * Club domestic league appearances and goals

Bernardo da Velha (born 29 January 1942) is a Bissau-Guinean-born Portuguese former footballer who played as a defender and a football manager.

== Career ==
Velha began playing at the youth level with Sporting Lisboa in 1962. He played in the Primeira Divisão in 1964 with FC Porto. He would feature in the 1968 Taça de Portugal Final, and assisted in securing the Taça de Portugal for Porto. Throughout his tenure with Porto he played in the 1968–69 European Cup Winners' Cup against Slovan Bratislava, and Cardiff City. In 1969, he signed with league rivals Vitória S.C. where he played for two seasons. He also appeared in the 1969–70 Inter-Cities Fairs Cup, and 1970–71 Inter-Cities Fairs Cup.

In 1971, he played with Boavista F.C. for three seasons, and later with S.C. Espinho, and Leixões S.C. In 1978, he played abroad in the National Soccer League with Toronto First Portuguese. In 1981, he was named the head coach for Toronto First Portuguese.
