= 1968 Taça de Portugal final =

- Event: 1967–68 Taça de Portugal
| Porto | Vitória de Setúbal |
| 2 | 1 |
- Date: 16 June 1968
- Venue: Estádio Nacional, Oeiras
- Referee: Joaquim Campos (Lisbon)

The 1968 Taça de Portugal final was the final match of the 1967–68 Taça de Portugal, the 28th season of the Taça de Portugal, the premier Portuguese football cup competition organized by the Portuguese Football Federation (FPF). The match was played on 16 June 1968 at the Estádio Nacional in Oeiras, and opposed two Primeira Liga sides: Porto and Vitória de Setúbal. Porto defeated Vitória de Setúbal 2–1 to claim a third Taça de Portugal.

== Match ==
=== Details ===
16 June 1968

| Porto | 2–1 | Vitória de Setúbal |
|---|---|---|
| Valdemar 15'; Nóbrega 23' | | Pedras 5' |

Estádio Nacional, Oeiras
Referee: Joaquim Campos (Lisbon)

| Porto | Vitória de Setúbal |

| GK | 1 | (Portugal) Américo Lopes (c) |
| DF | | (Portugal) João Atraca |
| DF | | (Portugal) Valdemar Pacheco |
| MF | | (Portugal) Custódio Pinto |
| MF | | (Portugal) Pavão |
| MF | | (Portugal) Rolando Gonçalves |
| FW | | (Portugal) Bernardo da Velha |
| FW | | (Brazil) Djalma Freitas |
| FW | | (Portugal) Vítor Gomes |
| FW | | (Portugal) Francisco Nóbrega |
| FW | | (Portugal) Jaime Silva |
Substitutes:
Manager:
(Portugal) José Maria Pedroto

| GK | 1 | (Portugal) Dinis Vital |
| DF | | (Portugal) Herculano Oliveira |
| DF | | (Portugal) Joaquim Conceição |
| DF | | (Portugal) Carlos Cardoso |
| MF | | (Portugal) Fernando Tomé |
| MF | | (Portugal) Pedras |
| MF | | (Portugal) Carriço |
| MF | | (Portugal) Petita |
| FW | | (Portugal) Félix Guerreiro |
| FW | | (Portugal) José Maria (c) |
| FW | | (Portugal) Jacinto João |
Substitutes:
Manager:
(Portugal) Fernando Vaz

1967–68 Taça de Portugal Winners
Porto
3rd Title

Match officials

- Assistant referees:
- Fourth official:

Match rules

- 90 minutes.
- 30 minutes of extra time if necessary.
