= João Lourenço (footballer, born 1942) =

Portuguese footballer

Personal information
- Full name: João de Matos Moura Lourenço
- Date of birth: 8 April 1942 (age 84)
- Place of birth: Alcobaça, Portugal
- Position: Striker

Youth career
- Alcobaça

Senior career*
Years	Team	Apps	(Gls)
1960–1961	Alcobaça		
1961–1964	Académica	56	(40)
1964–1972	Sporting CP	151	(93)
Total		207	(133)
Medal record
Men's football
Representing Portugal
FIFA World Cup
Third place	1966 England
- * Club domestic league appearances and goals

João de Matos Moura Lourenço (born 8 April 1942) is a Portuguese former footballer who played as a striker, most notably for Sporting CP.

== Club career ==
Born in Alcobaça, Leiria District, Lourenço started playing football in 1960 with local G.C. Alcobaça. After one season, he signed for Associação Académica de Coimbra.

In the summer of 1964, Lourenço joined Primeira Liga club Sporting CP. He remained in Lisbon eight years, winning the 1966 and 1970 national championships.

Lourenço retired in June 1972 aged only 30, having scored 145 goals in 219 competitive matches for the Lions including 93 in the league. On a rainy afternoon in October 1965, he netted four times in a 4–2 away win against S.L. Benfica as Sporting went on to win the domestic championship; he added 18 goals in European competition, only being surpassed many years later by Liédson.

== International career ==
Lourenço was a member of the Portugal squad that participated in the 1966 FIFA World Cup in England, but did not make any appearance in the competition for the third-placed team, eventually being the only player called for the tournament that would never be capped.

== Personal life ==
Lourenço's career ended in 1972, when he still had a year left on his contract with Sporting. He retired from football and moved to Portuguese Angola because he did not want to fight in the Portuguese Colonial War, and as the African territory was under Portuguese rule, he was legally exempt from military service.

Subsequently, Lourenço emigrated to Canada, where he worked in a flat block, a bureau de change and the cargo department of Sabena (a Belgian airline). He returned to Portugal in 1981, being employed at Securitas.
