= João Maia (footballer) =

Portuguese footballer

Personal information
- Full name: João Francisco Maia
- Date of birth: 24 October 1899
- Place of birth: Lisbon, Portugal
- Date of death: Deceased
- Position: Forward

Senior career*
Years	Team	Apps	(Gls)
1917–1929	Sporting CP		

International career
1921–1925	Portugal	4	(0)
- * Club domestic league appearances and goals

João Francisco Maia (24 October 1899 – ?) was a Portuguese footballer who played as a forward.
