= Armando Ferreira =

Portuguese footballer

Personal information
- Full name: Armando Félix Ferreira
- Date of birth: 23 December 1919
- Place of birth: Barreiro, Portugal
- Date of death: 31 July 2005 (aged 85)
- Position: Forward

Senior career*
Years	Team	Apps	(Gls)
1937–1938	SC Império		
1938–1939	Barreirense	13	(2)
1939–1950	Sporting CP		

International career
1940–1949	Portugal	5	(0)
- * Club domestic league appearances and goals

Armando Félix Ferreira (23 December 1919 – 31 July 2005) was a Portuguese footballer who played as a forward.
