= Rolando Gonçalves =

Portuguese footballer (1944–2022)

José Rolando
Personal information
- Full name: José Rolando Andrade Gonçalves
- Date of birth: 11 June 1944
- Place of birth: Porto, Portugal
- Date of death: 4 February 2022 (aged 77)
- Position: Centre back

Youth career
- 1961–1963: Porto

Senior career*
Years	Team	Apps	(Gls)
1963–1975	Porto	248	(5)
1975–1976	Paços de Ferreira	–	(–)
1976–1977	Penafiel	–	(–)
1978–1979	Freamunde	–	(–)
1979–1980	Avanca	–	(–)

International career
	Portugal B	1	(0)
1968–1972	Portugal	8	(0)
- * Club domestic league appearances and goals

José Rolando Andrade Gonçalves (11 June 1944 - 4 February 2022), known as José Rolando, was a Portuguese footballer who played as a centre back.

During his career, Rolando played for five different teams in which he spent the majority of his career with Porto.

Rolando made his debut for the Portugal national football team on 11 December 1968 in a 4–2 away loss against Greece in a 1970 FIFA World Cup qualifying match. He went on to gain a further seven more caps, of which his last national team appearance came on 29 March 1972 against Cyprus in a 4–0 home victory.

== Death ==
Rolando died on 4 February 2022 at the age of 77 of undisclosed causes.
