= Michael Walsh (engineer) =

American vehicle emissions engineer (born 1943)

- Education: Manhattan College; Princeton University
- Engineering career
- Discipline: vehicle emissions
- Employers: City of New York Department of Air Resources (1970–74); U.S. Environmental Protection Agency (1974–81)
- Awards: MacArthur Fellows Program

Michael P. Walsh (born August 17, 1943) is an American vehicle emissions engineer.

== Life ==
Walsh graduated from Manhattan College with a B.S. (1966), and studied at Princeton University (1969–70). He worked in government service, directing motor vehicle pollution control efforts in the City of New York Department of Air Resources (1970–74) and the U.S. Environmental Protection Agency (1974–81).

Since 1981, Walsh has been an independent technical consultant on vehicle emission standards.

In 2005, he received a "genius grant" from the MacArthur Fellows Program.

== Works ==
- Air pollution from motor vehicles: standards and technologies for controlling emissions, Asif Faiz, Christopher S. Weaver, Michael P. Walsh, World Bank Publications, 1996, ISBN 978-0-8213-3444-7
- Clean fuels for Asia: technical options for moving toward unleaded gasoline and low-sulfur diesel, Michael Walsh, Jitendra J. Shah, World Bank Publications, 1997, ISBN 978-0-8213-4033-2
- Urban Air Pollution in Developing Country Megacities, Slideshare, Michael P. Walsh
