= Gomes da Costa (footballer) =

Portuguese footballer (1919–1987)

Personal information
- Full name: Francisco Gomes da Costa
- Date of birth: 25 February 1919
- Place of birth: Portugal
- Date of death: 1987 (aged 67–68)
- Position: Forward

Senior career*
Years	Team	Apps	(Gls)
- FC Porto

International career
1945	Portugal	1	(0)
- * Club domestic league appearances and goals

Francisco Gomes da Costa (25 February 1919 – 1987) was a Portuguese footballer who played as a forward.

Costa died in 1987.
