= Correia Dias =

Portuguese footballer

Personal information
- Full name: Manuel Belo Correia Dias
- Date of birth: 2 March 1919
- Place of birth: Ovar, Portugal
- Position: Forward

Senior career*
Years	Team	Apps	(Gls)
1938–1948	Porto		
1948–1950	Ovarense		
- * Club domestic league appearances and goals

Manuel Belo Correia Dias (born 24 March 1919) is a Portuguese retired professional footballer who played as a forward.

== Career ==
Correia Dias was born in Ovar.

He spent most of his career with Porto. In the 1941-42 edition of the Portuguese championship he was the top scorer, with 37 goals in 22 matches, averaging 1.69 goals per game.
