= Mikey Walsh =

British writer

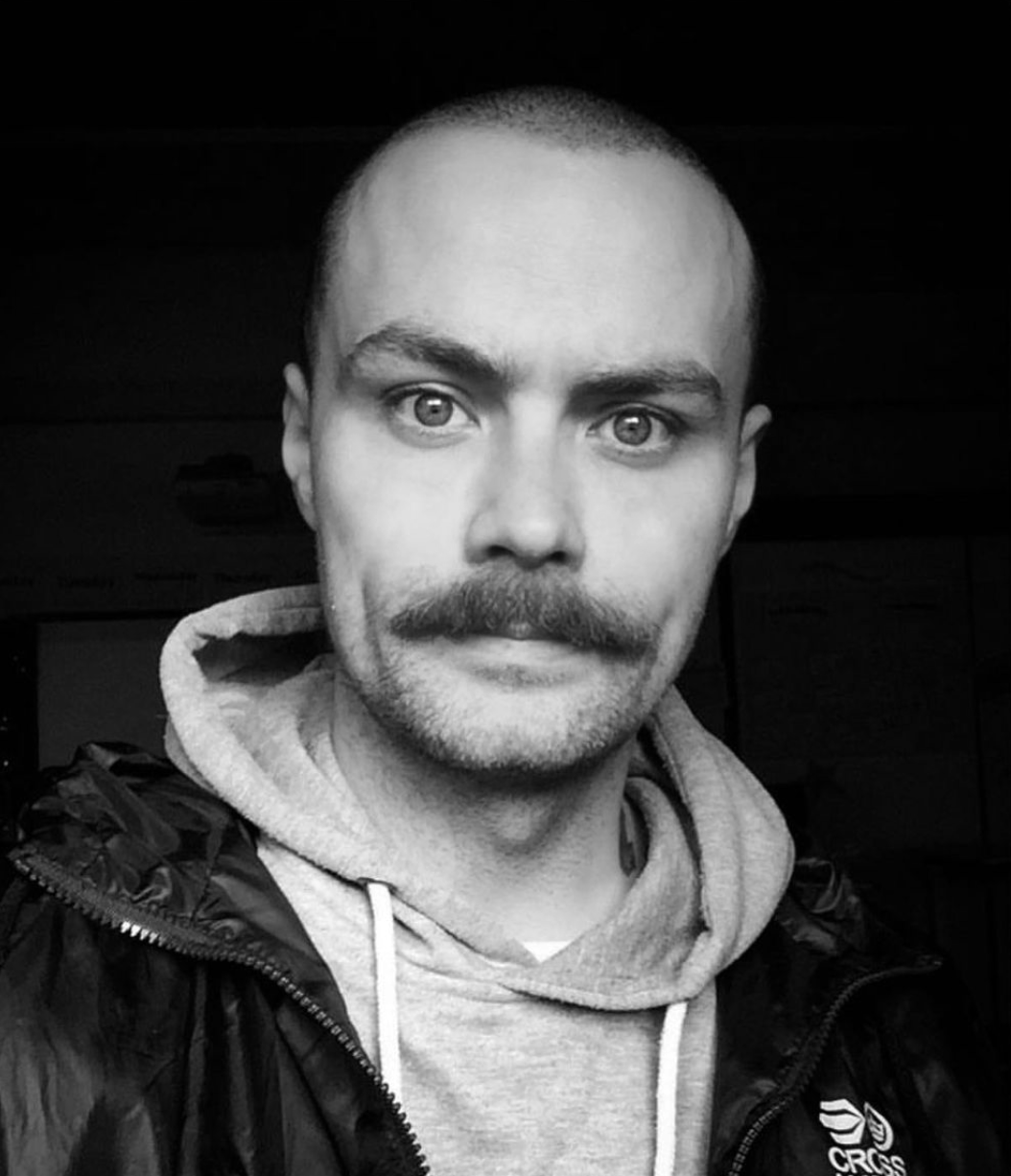
- Mikey Walsh
- Born: 22 September 1980 (age 45)
- Occupations: Writer, columnist

Mikey Walsh (born 22 September 1980) is a British writer and columnist, best known for his autobiography Gypsy Boy and its follow-up, Gypsy Boy on the Run.

== Early life ==
Walsh was born on 22 September 1980. He brought up to be a bare-knuckle fighter in the Romani community. He was forced to leave his family and culture in 1996 after coming out as gay.

== Career ==
In 2010, Walsh published his debut novel and autobiography Gypsy Boy. The book became a UK best-seller. It was published by Hodder & Stoughton UK and St. Martin's Press USA.

Gypsy Boy: On the Run (2011) was Walsh's second autobiography and sequel to Gypsy Boy, also a UK best-seller. It was published by Hodder & Stoughton UK and St. Martin's Press USA.

Walsh's first interview was for BBC Radio 4's The Choice with Michael Buerk in 2011, where he spoke about his life and what brought him to have to leave his culture.

In 2014 and 2015, Walsh was added to The Independent's Rainbow List of the most influential British LGBT people. In 2015, Walsh was filmed to share his coming out story for The Albert Kennedy Trust's winter appeal.

The film adaptation of Gypsy Boy was announced to be in development since soon after the memoir's publication, with the screenplay adapted by James Graham. X+Y director Morgan Matthews was set to direct, and Benedict Cumberbatch was set to play Walsh's father. As of 2025, it is still in pre-production.

In the years since the publication of his memoirs, Walsh has been featured in Attitude's "Gay Role Models" issue, and has written various guest columns for Gay Times.
