= 1934–35 Campeonato da Liga =

1st season of top-tier Portuguese football

Primeira Liga
- Season: 1934–35
- Champions: Porto; 1st title
- Matches: 56
- Goals: 258 (4.61 per match)
- Biggest home win: Porto 7-0 Académico do Porto; Belenenses 7-0 Académico do Porto
- Biggest away win: Académica de Coimbra 0-6 Sporting CP
- Highest scoring: Porto 7-4 União Lisboa

The 1934–35 Campeonato da Liga season was the first season of top-tier football in Portugal. Although that, the most important national competition (in a knock-out cup format) was still called Portuguese Championship, until 1938, the competition was considered not very competitive with a reduced number of matches played by each team. So a new competition, in round-robin format was created ind 1934, with 8 clubs. Although at time the winner of the Portuguese Championship was considered the National Champion, later, the winner of Campeonato da Liga 1934–35 would be considered the first National Champion.

== Overview ==
Location of teams in the 1934–35 Liga

For the tournament, there were invited 8 clubs from the 4 major Portuguese District Football Associations: 4 teams from Lisbon FA, 2 from Porto FA, 1 from Setúbal FA and 1 from Coimbra FA. F.C. Porto won the championship. There were no relegations or promotions, since qualification was based on the results of the Regional Championships.

== League standings ==
Pos	Team	Pld	W	D	L	GF	GA	GD	Pts
1	Porto (C)	14	10	2	2	43	19	+24	22
2	Sporting CP	14	8	4	2	39	20	+19	20
3	Benfica	14	8	3	3	41	23	+18	19
4	Belenenses	14	8	2	4	45	20	+25	18
5	Vitória de Setúbal	14	7	2	5	26	24	+2	16
6	União Lisboa	14	3	2	9	30	49	−19	8
7	Académico	14	2	2	10	20	54	−34	6
8	Académica	14	1	1	12	14	49	−35	3

Source: rsssf.com
(C) Champions

== Results ==
Home \ Away	ACA	ACD	BEL	BEN	POR	SCP	UNL	VSE
Académica		2–1	0–5	2–2	2–4	0–6	1–3	0–1
Académico	3–2		3–2	1–4	0–3	2–3	3–3	3–6
Belenenses	4–0	7–0		2–1	1–1	1–1	7–3	3–0
Benfica	4–1	7–2	5–3		3–0	1–1	2–1	3–1
Porto	7–1	7–0	1–0	2–1		4–2	7–4	3–2
Sporting CP	5–1	3–0	1–3	3–1	2–2		5–0	1–1
União Lisboa	1–0	5–2	2–6	2–2	0–2	4–5		1–3
Vitória de Setúbal	3–2	0–0	2–1	2–5	1–0	0–1	4–1	

Legend: Blue = home team win; Yellow = draw; Red = away team win.
