= 1939–40 Primeira Divisão =

6th season of top-tier Portuguese football

Primeira Divisão
- Season: 1939–40
- Champions: F.C. Porto; 3rd title
- Matches: 90
- Goals: 431 (4.79 per match)

The 1939–40 Primeira Divisão season was the sixth season of top-tier football in Portugal. The season was marked by a controversy regarding the teams qualified from Porto FA Regional Championship.

Due to an administrative battle between FC Porto and Académico do Porto regarding a Regional Championship game that ended with only 43 minutes after the start and later repeated (which FC Porto won) according to a Porto FA decision, the Portuguese Federation came out with a decision to satisfy both clubs, expanding Primeira Divisão to 10 teams (one more from Porto FA and another from Setúbal FA) and annulling the result from the repetition match. With this decision, FC Porto lost the Regional title and finished third; Leixões SC became the new regional champion, ahead second-placed Académico. All three teams qualified for the 1939–40 Primeira Divisão.

== Overview ==
Location of teams in the 1939–40 Divisão

It was contested by 10 teams, and F.C. Porto won the championship.

== League standings ==
Pos	Team	Pld	W	D	L	GF	GA	GD	Pts
1	Porto (C)	18	17	0	1	76	21	+55	34
2	Sporting CP	18	15	2	1	87	23	+64	32
3	Belenenses	18	11	3	4	58	21	+37	25
4	Benfica	18	11	1	6	58	34	+24	23
5	Barreirense	18	8	3	7	27	39	−12	19
6	Académica	18	7	3	8	42	54	−12	17
7	Carcavelinhos	18	4	2	12	26	49	−23	10
8	Académico	18	3	2	13	24	53	−29	8
9	Leixões	18	1	5	12	26	70	−44	7
10	Vitória de Setúbal	18	1	3	14	7	67	−60	5

(C) Champions

== Results ==
Home \ Away	ACA	ACD	BAR	BEL	BEN	CAR	LEI	POR	SCP	VSE
Académica		5–2	5–1	2–2	5–4	2–2	3–1	0–2	2–5	5–0
Académico	8–2		0–1	2–3	1–5	1–3	0–0	0–2	0–1	1–0
Barreirense	2–0	1–1		2–2	0–1	1–0	4–1	2–3	0–0	3–1
Belenenses	5–0	6–1	6–0		2–0	1–0	9–0	0–1	0–0	8–0
Benfica	4–1	1–0	5–1	4–2		3–2	7–2	2–3	1–3	9–1
Carcavelinhos	0–4	3–2	2–3	1–5	1–3		5–2	2–3	2–5	0–0
Leixões	3–3	1–2	0–1	1–3	3–3	4–1		2–5	2–9	1–1
Porto	6–0	6–1	5–1	3–2	4–2	6–0	5–1		4–2	11–0
Sporting CP	6–1	11–2	7–3	4–1	3–1	4–0	8–1	4–3		12–0
Vitória de Setúbal	1–2	2–0	0–1	0–1	0–3	0–2	1–1	0–4	0–3	

Legend: Blue = home team win; Yellow = draw; Red = away team win.

== Sources ==
- Tovar, Rui (2011). Almanaque do FC Porto 1893–2011 (in Portuguese). Alfragide: Caderno. ISBN 9789892315430.
