= Derby de Lisboa =

Portuguese football derby match

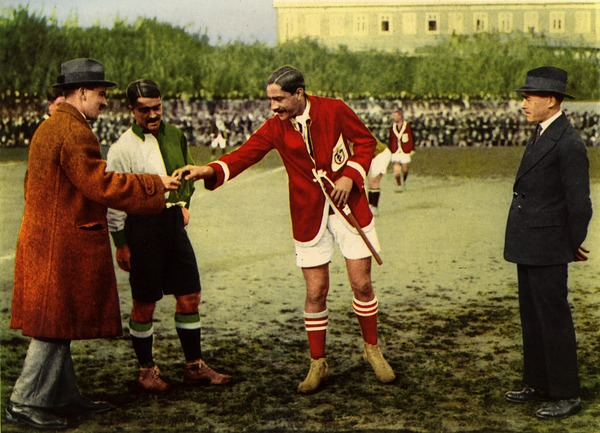
- Players Francisco Stromp and Cosme Damião before a derby on 17 January 1915
- Location: Lisbon, Portugal
- Teams: Benfica; Sporting
- First meeting: 1 December 1907; Campeonato de Lisboa; Benfica 1–2 Sporting
- Latest meeting: 19 April 2026; Primeira Liga; Sporting 1–2 Benfica
- Stadiums: Estádio da Luz (Benfica); Estádio José Alvalade (Sporting)

Statistics
- Total meetings: 327
- Most wins: Benfica (140)
- Most player appearances: Francisco Albino (52)
- Top scorer: Fernando Peyroteo (48)
- Largest victory: Sporting 7–1 Benfica; 14 December 1986 (Primeira Divisão)

The Derby de Lisboa or Dérbi de Lisboa (Note: Also known as Dérbi Eterno (eternal derby), Dérbi dos Dérbis (derby of the derbies), Dérbi da Segunda Circular (Segunda Circular derby), Dérbi da Capital (derby of the capital)) (English: Lisbon derby) is the biggest football derby match in Portugal. It is played between Lisbon-based clubs Benfica and Sporting, two of the most decorated clubs in the country and members of Portugal's "Big Three" clubs. The rivalry originated in 1907 when eight Benfica players moved to Sporting before the first derby between them. The derby is generally an intense affair within the city of Lisbon and a significant event for the Portuguese diaspora worldwide.

== Honours comparison ==
These are the major football honours of Benfica and Sporting as of 6th May 2026.

| National | Benfica | Sporting |
|---|---|---|
| Championship of Portugal | 3 | 4 |
| Portuguese League | 38 | 21 |
| Portuguese Cup | 26 | 18 |
| Portuguese League Cup | 8 | 4 |
| Portuguese Super Cup | 10 | 9 |
| Total | 85 | 56 |
| International | Benfica | Sporting |
| European Cup / UEFA Champions League | 2 | — |
| UEFA Cup Winners' Cup | — | 1 |
| Total | 2 | 1 |
| Grand Total | 87 | 57 |

== Championship of Lisbon ==
=== Head-to-head results ===
| Benfica wins | 33 |
| Draws | 15 |
| Sporting wins | 37 |
| Benfica goals | 138 |
| Sporting goals | 140 |
| Total matches | 85 |

| Team | Home wins | Home draws | Home losses |
|---|---|---|---|
| Benfica | 25 | 7 | 13 |
| Sporting | 24 | 8 | 8 |

== League matches ==
The matches listed below are only Primeira Liga matches, club name in bold indicates win. The score is given at full-time, and in the goals columns, the goalscorer and time when goal was scored is noted.

Team won the competition that season

| # | Season | R. | Home team | Away team | Score | Goals (home) | Goals (away) |
|---|---|---|---|---|---|---|---|
| 1 | 1934–35 | 4 | Benfica | Sporting | 1–1 | Carlos Torres (27) | Adolfo Mourão (65) |
| 2 | 1934–35 | 11 | **Sporting** | Benfica | 3–1 | Rui Carneiro (25 p.), Francisco Lopes (55), Manuel Soeiro (57) | Valadas (85) |
| 3 | 1935–36 | 6 | Sporting | **Benfica** | 2–4 | Adolfo Mourão (45), Manuel Soeiro (76) | Raúl Silva (41 o.g.), Valadas (43, 89), Vítor Silva (55) |
| 4 | 1935–36 | 13 | **Benfica** | Sporting | 3–1 | Valadas (32, 55, 62) | Francisco Lopes (59) |
| 5 | 1936–37 | 4 | Sporting | **Benfica** | 1–4 | Adolfo Mourão (40) | Espírito Santo (20), Rogério de Sousa (21, 53), Valadas (39) |
| 6 | 1936–37 | 11 | **Benfica** | Sporting | 5–1 | Espírito Santo (48, 73), Rogério de Sousa (55), Valadas (72), Xavier (81) | Pireza (80) |
| 7 | 1937–38 | 2 | **Benfica** | Sporting | 3–2 | Rogério de Sousa (28, 31), Espírito Santo (64) | Peyroteo (6, 70) |
| 8 | 1937–38 | 9 | Sporting | Benfica | 2–2 | Peyroteo (15, 79) | Domingos Lopes (20), Xavier (68) |
| 9 | 1938–39 | 2 | Sporting | **Benfica** | 0–1 | | Alexandre Brito (17) |
| 10 | 1938–39 | 9 | Benfica | **Sporting** | 1–4 | Valadas (38) | Peyroteo (47, 51), João Cruz (72), Adolfo Mourão (79) |
| 11 | 1939–40 | 7 | Benfica | **Sporting** | 1–3 | Lourenço (33) | Peyroteo (34, 47, 51) |
| 12 | 1939–40 | 16 | **Sporting** | Benfica | 3–1 | Adolfo Mourão (3), Peyroteo (20), Mário Galvão (37 p.) | Francisco Rodrigues (11) |
| 13 | 1940–41 | 4 | Sporting | **Benfica** | 1–2 | Peyroteo (40) | Valadas (27, 37) |
| 14 | 1940–41 | 11 | Benfica | **Sporting** | 2–4 | Francisco Ferreira (12 p.), Rui Araújo (75 o.g.) | Adolfo Mourão (20, 55), António Martins (65 o.g.), Peyroteo (88) |
| 15 | 1941–42 | 8 | Sporting | **Benfica** | 1–4 | Rui Araújo (65 p.) | Francisco Rodrigues (42, 49), Joaquim Teixeira (64), Nelo Barros (77) |
| 16 | 1941–42 | 19 | **Benfica** | Sporting | 4–3 | Francisco Ferreira (30), Nelo Barros (43), Francisco Rodrigues (48), Valadas (55) | Pireza (8), Manuel Soeiro (35), João Cruz (39) |
| 17 | 1942–43 | 8 | **Sporting** | Benfica | 3–2 | João Cruz (39), Adolfo Mourão (66), Peyroteo (75) | Julinho (33, 52) |
| 18 | 1942–43 | 17 | **Benfica** | Sporting | 2–1 | Julinho (5), Manuel da Costa (41) | Adolfo Mourão (30) |
| 19 | 1943–44 | 8 | **Benfica** | Sporting | 5–4 | Joaquim Teixeira (24, 55, 72, 79), Julinho (74) | António Martins (18 o.g.), Peyroteo (50), Albano (77), Adolfo Mourão (84) |
| 20 | 1943–44 | 17 | **Sporting** | Benfica | 1–0 | Peyroteo (43) | |
| 21 | 1944–45 | 3 | Sporting | **Benfica** | 0–2 | | Julinho (4), Arsénio (70) |
| 22 | 1944–45 | 12 | **Benfica** | Sporting | 4–1 | Joaquim Teixeira (32), Rogério Pipi (42), Julinho (48), Arsénio (74) | Octávio Barrosa (8) |
| 23 | 1945–46 | 7 | **Sporting** | Benfica | 4–3 | António Martins (42 o.g.), Peyroteo (44, 56), António Marques (68) | Rogério Pipi (8), Espírito Santo (10, 21) |
| 24 | 1945–46 | 18 | **Benfica** | Sporting | 7–2 | Arsénio (46, 72, 78), Mário Rui (52, 75, 81), Rogério Pipi (58) | Albano (67), Peyroteo (85) |
| 25 | 1946–47 | 9 | **Sporting** | Benfica | 6–1 | Travassos (7, 28, 80), Peyroteo (34), Albano (60), Vasques (84) | Baptista (16) |
| 26 | 1946–47 | 22 | **Benfica** | Sporting | 3–1 | Joaquim Claro (41), Julinho (50), Manuel Reis (68 o.g.) | Sidónio Silva (26) |
| 27 | 1947–48 | 9 | Sporting | **Benfica** | 1–3 | Travassos (89 p.) | Melão (1), Corona (15), Espírito Santo (17) |
| 28 | 1947–48 | 22 | Benfica | **Sporting** | 1–4 | Espírito Santo (75) | Peyroteo (35, 41, 58, 69) |
| 29 | 1948–49 | 9 | **Sporting** | Benfica | 5–1 | Vasques (15, 68), Jesus Correia (55), Peyroteo (76), Albano (82) | Corona (26) |
| 30 | 1948–49 | 22 | Benfica | Sporting | 3–3 | Corona (43, 88), Rosário (80) | Peyroteo (19, 56), Jesus Correia (52) |
| 31 | 1949–50 | 10 | Sporting | **Benfica** | 1–2 | Jesus Correia (52) | Rogério Pipi (46), Julinho (85) |
| 32 | 1949–50 | 23 | Benfica | **Sporting** | 2–3 | Rogério Pipi (8 p.), Julinho (25) | Jesus Correia (12), João Martins (19), Vasques (30) |
| 33 | 1950–51 | 1 | Benfica | **Sporting** | 1–3 | Joaquim Teixeira (12 p.) | Félix Antunes (52 o.g.), Vasques (80), João Martins (85) |
| 34 | 1950–51 | 14 | Sporting | Benfica | 2–2 | José Travassos (33), Galileu (48) | José Águas (29, 89) |
| 35 | 1951–52 | 9 | **Benfica** | Sporting | 3–2 | José Águas (52, 63), Rogério Pipi (69) | Jesus Correia (10), Albuquerque (32) |
| 36 | 1951–52 | 22 | **Sporting** | Benfica | 3–2 | Vasques (9), Jesus Correia (11), João Martins (26) | Rogério Pipi (36 p., 37) |
| 37 | 1952–53 | 2 | Benfica | **Sporting** | 2–3 | José Águas (39), Arsénio (43) | Jesus Correia (1), Vasques (13, 72) |
| 38 | 1952–53 | 15 | **Sporting** | Benfica | 3–1 | Albano (37 p.), Vasques (60), Rola (87) | José Águas (35) |
| 39 | 1953–54 | 13 | Benfica | **Sporting** | 0–2 | | João Martins (18, 73) |
| 40 | 1953–54 | 26 | **Sporting** | Benfica | 3–2 | János Hrotkó (27), João Martins (52, 66) | José Águas (7), Salvador Martins (43) |
| 41 | 1954–55 | 9 | Sporting | **Benfica** | 0–1 | | Francisco Calado (57 p.) |
| 42 | 1954–55 | 22 | Benfica | Sporting | 1–1 | Coluna (4) | Artur Santos (61 o.g.) |
| 43 | 1955–56 | 6 | Sporting | **Benfica** | 1–3 | Valter de Castro (24) | Francisco Calado (18, 56, 87) |
| 44 | 1955–56 | 19 | **Benfica** | Sporting | 3–0 | José Águas (41), Salvador Martins (63, 89) | |
| 45 | 1956–57 | 2 | Benfica | Sporting | 1–1 | José Águas (77 p.) | Manuel Pompeu (57 p.) |
| 46 | 1956–57 | 15 | **Sporting** | Benfica | 1–0 | Hugo Sarmento (17) | |
| 47 | 1957–58 | 10 | **Sporting** | Benfica | 2–0 | Vasques (28), Vadinho (53) | |
| 48 | 1957–58 | 23 | **Benfica** | Sporting | 2–0 | José Águas (5, 72 p.) | |
| 49 | 1958–59 | 12 | **Benfica** | Sporting | 4–0 | António Mendes (19, 35), José Águas (21, 73) | |
| 50 | 1958–59 | 25 | **Sporting** | Benfica | 2–1 | Hugo Sarmento (13), Vasques (53) | Cavém (16) |
| 51 | 1959–60 | 11 | Sporting | Benfica | 1–1 | Seminário (55) | José Augusto (59) |
| 52 | 1959–60 | 24 | **Benfica** | Sporting | 4–3 | José Augusto (1, 50 p.), Cavém (10), José Águas (26) | Seminário (19), José Monteiro (81), Lúcio Soares (84) |
| 53 | 1960–61 | 9 | **Benfica** | Sporting | 1–0 | Santana (22) | |
| 54 | 1960–61 | 22 | Sporting | Benfica | 1–1 | Ernesto de Figueiredo (60) | José Augusto (54) |
| 55 | 1961–62 | 13 | Benfica | Sporting | 3–3 | Santana (2), Germano (75 p.), José Augusto (81) | Diego Arizaga (1), Géo Carvalho (11), Hugo Sarmento (46) |
| 56 | 1961–62 | 26 | **Sporting** | Benfica | 3–1 | Morais (20), Hugo Sarmento (27), Costa Pereira (40 o.g.) | Eusébio (29) |
| 57 | 1962–63 | 11 | **Benfica** | Sporting | 4–3 | José Torres (17, 27), Eusébio (29), Santana (71) | Pérides (70), Morais (79), Géo Carvalho (81) |
| 58 | 1962–63 | 24 | Sporting | **Benfica** | 1–3 | Ernesto de Figueiredo (75) | Augusto Silva (15), Eusébio (35 p.), Simões (51) |
| 59 | 1963–64 | 9 | **Sporting** | Benfica | 3–1 | Ernesto de Figueiredo (21, 69), Morais (60) | Eusébio (77 p.) |
| 60 | 1963–64 | 22 | Benfica | Sporting | 2–2 | José Augusto (20), Eusébio (47) | Ernesto de Figueiredo (17), Osvaldo da Silva (82) |
| 61 | 1964–65 | 2 | **Benfica** | Sporting | 3–0 | Eusébio (2), José Torres (5, 85) | |
| 62 | 1964–65 | 15 | Sporting | Benfica | 2–2 | Carlitos (1), Lourenço (74) | Eusébio (36 p.), José Augusto (57) |
| 63 | 1965–66 | 6 | Benfica | **Sporting** | 2–4 | Eusébio (18), José Torres (88) | Lourenço (16, 40, 68, 77) |
| 64 | 1965–66 | 19 | Sporting | **Benfica** | 0–2 | | Eusébio (53), José Torres (73) |
| 65 | 1966–67 | 4 | **Benfica** | Sporting | 3–0 | Eusébio (16, 35 p.), José Torres (41) | |
| 66 | 1966–67 | 17 | Sporting | Benfica | 1–1 | Vítor Gonçalves (50) | Eusébio (14) |
| 67 | 1967–68 | 11 | **Sporting** | Benfica | 3–1 | Ernesto de Figueiredo (4, 20), José Henrique (90 o.g.) | Jacinto Santos (53) |
| 68 | 1967–68 | 24 | **Benfica** | Sporting | 1–0 | Eusébio (8) | |
| 69 | 1968–69 | 8 | Sporting | Benfica | 0–0 | | |
| 70 | 1968–69 | 21 | Benfica | Sporting | 0–0 | | |
| 71 | 1969–70 | 7 | **Sporting** | Benfica | 1–0 | Marinho (20) | |
| 72 | 1969–70 | 20 | Benfica | Sporting | 1–1 | Jaime Graça (83) | Nélson Fernandes (29) |
| 73 | 1970–71 | 2 | Sporting | Benfica | 1–1 | Marinho (59) | Artur Jorge (56) |
| 74 | 1970–71 | 15 | **Benfica** | Sporting | 5–1 | Eusébio (24), Artur Jorge (31, 57, 90), Nené (50) | José Carlos (70 p.) |
| 75 | 1971–72 | 14 | Sporting | **Benfica** | 0–3 | | Eusébio (51), Rui Rodrigues (57), Nené (84) |
| 76 | 1971–72 | 29 | **Benfica** | Sporting | 2–1 | Eusébio (1, 29) | Yazalde (56) |
| 77 | 1972–73 | 5 | **Benfica** | Sporting | 4–1 | Eusébio (25, 34, 86, 89) | Yazalde (84) |
| 78 | 1972–73 | 20 | Sporting | **Benfica** | 1–2 | Chico Faria (38) | Nené (26), Artur Jorge (27) |
| 79 | 1973–74 | 11 | **Benfica** | Sporting | 2–0 | Eusébio (54, 74) | |
| 80 | 1973–74 | 26 | Sporting | **Benfica** | 3–5 | Yazalde (8, 42 p.), Dé Aranha (89 p.) | Humberto Coelho (12), Nené (31, 35), Jordão (58), Vítor Martins (70) |
| 81 | 1974–75 | 14 | Benfica | Sporting | 1–1 | Vítor Móia (21) | Yazalde (48) |
| 82 | 1974–75 | 29 | Sporting | Benfica | 1–1 | Fraguito (38) | Diamantino Costa (52) |
| 83 | 1975–76 | 14 | Benfica | Sporting | 0–0 | | |
| 84 | 1975–76 | 29 | Sporting | **Benfica** | 0–3 | | Nené (82, 88), Jordão (85) |
| 85 | 1976–77 | 1 | **Sporting** | Benfica | 3–0 | Manuel Fernandes (60), Camilo (75), Baltasar (85) | |
| 86 | 1976–77 | 16 | **Benfica** | Sporting | 2–1 | Vítor Martins (22), Chalana (83) | Manuel Fernandes (35) |
| 87 | 1977–78 | 1 | Sporting | Benfica | 1–1 | Fraguito (20) | Chalana (7) |
| 88 | 1977–78 | 16 | **Benfica** | Sporting | 1–0 | Vítor Baptista (54) | |
| 89 | 1978–79 | 10 | **Benfica** | Sporting | 5–0 | Reinaldo (15, 28), Nené (18), João Alves (30, 40 p.) | |
| 90 | 1978–79 | 25 | Sporting | **Benfica** | 0–1 | | João Alves (52 p.) |
| 91 | 1979–80 | 9 | **Benfica** | Sporting | 3–2 | Reinaldo (38), Alberto (43), Nené (72 p.) | Jordão (52 p.), Paulo Meneses (86) |
| 92 | 1979–80 | 24 | **Sporting** | Benfica | 3–1 | Jordão (24 p., 81), Manuel Fernandes (36) | Diamantino (78) |
| 93 | 1980–81 | 12 | Sporting | Benfica | 1–1 | Carlos Freire (69) | César (25) |
| 94 | 1980–81 | 27 | Benfica | Sporting | 1–1 | Nené (43 p.) | Jordão (65) |
| 95 | 1981–82 | 8 | Benfica | Sporting | 1–1 | Nené (77) | António Oliveira (24) |
| 96 | 1981–82 | 23 | **Sporting** | Benfica | 3–1 | Jordão (20 p., 62 p., 78) | Carlos Manuel (13) |
| 97 | 1982–83 | 14 | **Sporting** | Benfica | 1–0 | Jordão (50 p.) | |
| 98 | 1982–83 | 29 | **Benfica** | Sporting | 1–0 | Chalana (9) | |
| 99 | 1983–84 | 14 | Sporting | **Benfica** | 0–1 | | Nené (85 p.) |
| 100 | 1983–84 | 29 | Benfica | Sporting | 1–1 | Chalana (17) | Kostov (66) |
| 101 | 1984–85 | 14 | **Sporting** | Benfica | 1–0 | Manuel Fernandes (3) | |
| 102 | 1984–85 | 29 | **Benfica** | Sporting | 3–1 | Nené (23, 53), Diamantino (88) | Romeu Silva (34) |
| 103 | 1985–86 | 14 | Sporting | Benfica | 0–0 | | |
| 104 | 1985–86 | 29 | Benfica | **Sporting** | 1–2 | Manniche (60) | Morato (11), Manuel Fernandes (22) |
| 105 | 1986–87 | 14 | **Sporting** | Benfica | 7–1 | Mário Jorge (15, 68), Manuel Fernandes (50, 71, 82, 86), Ralph Meade (65) | Wando (59) |
| 106 | 1986–87 | 29 | **Benfica** | Sporting | 2–1 | Chiquinho Carlos (17), Nunes (25) | Mário Jorge (70) |
| 107 | 1987–88 | 5 | Sporting | Benfica | 1–1 | Tony Sealy (49) | Tueba (66) |
| 108 | 1987–88 | 24 | **Benfica** | Sporting | 4–1 | Magnusson (12, 15), Rui Águas (30, 58) | Paulinho Cascavel (3) |
| 109 | 1988–89 | 18 | **Benfica** | Sporting | 2–0 | Magnusson (42), Pacheco (62) | |
| 110 | 1988–89 | 37 | Sporting | **Benfica** | 0–2 | | Valdo (13), Abel Campos (25) |
| 111 | 1989–90 | 8 | Sporting | **Benfica** | 0–1 | | César Brito (57) |
| 112 | 1989–90 | 25 | **Benfica** | Sporting | 2–1 | Vítor Paneira (22), Lima (32) | Paulo Silas (85) |
| 113 | 1990–91 | 16 | Sporting | **Benfica** | 0–2 | | Isaías (30), César Brito (87) |
| 114 | 1990–91 | 35 | Benfica | Sporting | 1–1 | Isaías (86) | Litos (80) |
| 115 | 1991–92 | 4 | Sporting | Benfica | 0–0 | | |
| 116 | 1991–92 | 21 | **Benfica** | Sporting | 2–0 | William (57), Pacheco (83) | |
| 117 | 1992–93 | 8 | **Sporting** | Benfica | 2–0 | Balakov (1), Yordanov (53) | |
| 118 | 1992–93 | 25 | **Benfica** | Sporting | 1–0 | Futre (65) | |
| 119 | 1993–94 | 13 | **Benfica** | Sporting | 2–1 | Yuran (50), Isaías (84) | Figo (29) |
| 120 | 1993–94 | 30 | Sporting | **Benfica** | 3–6 | Cadete (8), Figo (35), Balakov (80 p.) | João Pinto (30, 37, 44), Isaías (48, 57), Hélder (74) |
| 121 | 1994–95 | 13 | **Sporting** | Benfica | 1–0 | Amunike (56) | |
| 122 | 1994–95 | 30 | Benfica | **Sporting** | 1–2 | Dimas (22) | Balakov (9), Yordanov (11) |
| 123 | 1995–96 | 6 | **Sporting** | Benfica | 2–0 | Pedro Barbosa (49), Amunike (83) | |
| 124 | 1995–96 | 23 | Benfica | Sporting | 0–0 | | |
| 125 | 1996–97 | 8 | **Sporting** | Benfica | 1–0 | Beto (51) | |
| 126 | 1996–97 | 25 | **Benfica** | Sporting | 1–0 | João Pinto (15) | |
| 127 | 1997–98 | 5 | Benfica | Sporting | 0–0 | | |
| 128 | 1997–98 | 22 | Sporting | **Benfica** | 1–4 | Leandro (66) | Poborsky (44), Sousa (64), Brian Deane (69), João Pinto (83) |
| 129 | 1998–99 | 17 | Sporting | **Benfica** | 1–2 | Delfim (81) | Beto (27 o.g., 79 o.g.) |
| 130 | 1998–99 | 34 | Benfica | Sporting | 3–3 | Kandaurov (9), Poborsky (29), Nuno Gomes (86) | Yordanov (5, 38), Rui Jorge (75) |
| 131 | 1999–2000 | 16 | Benfica | Sporting | 0–0 | | |
| 132 | 1999–2000 | 33 | Sporting | **Benfica** | 0–1 | | Sabry (88) |
| 133 | 2000–01 | 13 | **Benfica** | Sporting | 3–0 | Van Hooijdonk (41 p.), João Tomás (77, 82) | |
| 134 | 2000–01 | 30 | **Sporting** | Benfica | 3–0 | Acosta (2), Pedro Barbosa (21), Beto (57) | |
| 135 | 2001–02 | 15 | Benfica | Sporting | 2–2 | Simão ( p.11), Zahovič (55) | Jardel (85 p., 87) |
| 136 | 2001–02 | 32 | Sporting | Benfica | 1–1 | Jardel (89 p.) | Jankauskas (73) |
| 137 | 2002–03 | 13 | Sporting | **Benfica** | 0–2 | | Zahovič (16), Tiago (42) |
| 138 | 2002–03 | 30 | Benfica | **Sporting** | 1–2 | Sokota (77) | Quaresma (10), João Pinto (33) |
| 139 | 2003–04 | 16 | Benfica | **Sporting** | 1–3 | Luisão (56) | Rochemback (8 p.), Elpídio Silva (33), Sá Pinto (90 p.) |
| 140 | 2003–04 | 33 | Sporting | **Benfica** | 0–1 | | Geovanni (87) |
| 141 | 2004–05 | 16 | **Sporting** | Benfica | 2–1 | Liédson (22, 68) | Nuno Gomes (26) |
| 142 | 2004–05 | 33 | **Benfica** | Sporting | 1–0 | Luisão (83) | |
| 143 | 2005–06 | 3 | **Sporting** | Benfica | 2–1 | Luís Loureiro (37), Liédson (75) | Simão (65) |
| 144 | 2005–06 | 20 | Benfica | **Sporting** | 1–3 | Simão (27 p.) | Sá Pinto (64 p.), Liédson (73, 82) |
| 145 | 2006–07 | 12 | Sporting | **Benfica** | 0–2 | | Ricardo Rocha (2), Simão (36) |
| 146 | 2006–07 | 27 | Benfica | Sporting | 1–1 | Miccoli (23) | Liédson (2) |
| 147 | 2007–08 | 6 | Benfica | Sporting | 0–0 | | |
| 148 | 2007–08 | 21 | Sporting | Benfica | 1–1 | Vukčević (12) | Cardozo (41) |
| 149 | 2008–09 | 4 | **Benfica** | Sporting | 2–0 | Reyes (67), Sidnei (72) | |
| 150 | 2008–09 | 19 | **Sporting** | Benfica | 3–2 | Liédson (11, 82), Derlei (47) | Reyes (36 p.), Cardozo (89) |
| 151 | 2009–10 | 11 | Sporting | Benfica | 0–0 | | |
| 152 | 2009–10 | 26 | **Benfica** | Sporting | 2–0 | Cardozo (68), Aimar (79) | |
| 153 | 2010–11 | 5 | **Benfica** | Sporting | 2–0 | Cardozo (13, 50) | |
| 154 | 2010–11 | 20 | Sporting | **Benfica** | 0–2 | | Salvio (15), Nico Gaitán (61) |
| 155 | 2011–12 | 11 | **Benfica** | Sporting | 1–0 | Javi García (42) | |
| 156 | 2011–12 | 26 | **Sporting** | Benfica | 1–0 | Van Wolfswinkel (18 p.) | |
| 157 | 2012–13 | 11 | Sporting | **Benfica** | 1–3 | Van Wolfswinkel (30) | Cardozo (59, 81 p., 86) |
| 158 | 2012–13 | 26 | **Benfica** | Sporting | 2–0 | Salvio (36), Lima (75) | |
| 159 | 2013–14 | 3 | Sporting | Benfica | 1–1 | Fredy Montero (10) | Marković (65) |
| 160 | 2013–14 | 18 | **Benfica** | Sporting | 2–0 | Nico Gaitán (28), Enzo Pérez (76) | |
| 161 | 2014–15 | 3 | Benfica | Sporting | 1–1 | Nico Gaitán (12) | Slimani (20) |
| 162 | 2014–15 | 20 | Sporting | Benfica | 1–1 | Jefferson (87) | Jardel (90+3) |
| 163 | 2015–16 | 8 | Benfica | **Sporting** | 0–3 | | Teo Guttiérrez (9), Slimani (21), Bryan Ruiz (31) |
| 164 | 2015–16 | 25 | Sporting | **Benfica** | 0–1 | | Mitroglou (20) |
| 165 | 2016–17 | 13 | **Benfica** | Sporting | 2–1 | Salvio (24), Raúl Jiménez (47) | Dost (69) |
| 166 | 2016–17 | 30 | Sporting | Benfica | 1–1 | Adrien Silva (5 p.) | Lindelöf (66) |
| 167 | 2017–18 | 16 | Benfica | Sporting | 1–1 | Jonas (90+1 p.) | Gelson Martins (16) |
| 168 | 2017–18 | 33 | Sporting | Benfica | 0–0 | | |
| 169 | 2018–19 | 3 | Benfica | Sporting | 1–1 | João Félix (86) | Nani (64 p.) |
| 170 | 2018–19 | 20 | Sporting | **Benfica** | 2–4 | Bruno Fernandes (43), Dost (89 p.) | Seferovic (11 p.), João Félix (36), Rúben Dias (47), Pizzi (73 p.) |
| 171 | 2019–20 | 17 | Sporting | **Benfica** | 0–2 | | Rafa Silva (80, 90+9) |
| 172 | 2019–20 | 34 | **Benfica** | Sporting | 2–1 | Seferovic (28), Carlos Vinícius (88) | Šporar (69) |
| 173 | 2020–21 | 16 | **Sporting** | Benfica | 1–0 | Nunes (90+2) | |
| 174 | 2020–21 | 33 | **Benfica** | Sporting | 4–3 | Seferovic (12, 48 p.), Pizzi (29), Veríssimo (37) | Gonçalves (45+1, 77 p.), Santos (62) |
| 175 | 2021–22 | 13 | Benfica | **Sporting** | 1–3 | Pizzi (90+5) | Sarabia (8), Paulinho (62), Nunes (68) |
| 176 | 2021–22 | 30 | Sporting | **Benfica** | 0–2 | | Núñez (14), Dias (90+3) |
| 177 | 2022–23 | 16 | Benfica | Sporting | 2–2 | Ramos (37, 64) | Bah (27 o.g.), Gonçalves (53 p.) |
| 178 | 2022–23 | 33 | Sporting | Benfica | 2–2 | Trincão (39), Diomande (44) | Aursnes (71), Neves (90+4) |
| 179 | 2023–24 | 11 | **Benfica** | Sporting | 2–1 | Neves (90+4), Tengstedt (90+7) | Gyökeres (45) |
| 180 | 2023–24 | 28 | **Sporting** | Benfica | 2–1 | Catamo (1, 90+1) | Bah (45+3) |
| 181 | 2024–25 | 16 | **Sporting** | Benfica | 1–0 | Catamo (29) | |
| 182 | 2024–25 | 33 | Benfica | Sporting | 1–1 | Aktürkoğlu (63) | Trincão (4) |
| 183 | 2025–26 | 13 | Benfica | Sporting | 1–1 | Sudakov (27) | Gonçalves (12) |
| 184 | 2025–26 | 30 | Sporting | **Benfica** | 1–2 | Morita (72) | Schjelderup (27 p.), Rafa Silva (90+3) |

=== Head-to-head results ===
| Benfica wins | 84 |
| Draws | 49 |
| Sporting wins | 51 |
| Benfica goals | 313 |
| Sporting goals | 250 |
| Total matches | 184 |

| Team | Home wins | Home draws | Home losses |
|---|---|---|---|
| Benfica | 49 | 27 | 16 |
| Sporting | 35 | 22 | 35 |

== Portuguese Cup matches ==
The matches listed below are only Taça de Portugal matches, club name in bold indicates win. The score is given at full-time; in the goals columns, the goalscorer and time when goal was scored is noted.

Team won the competition that season

| # | Season | R. | Home team | Away team | Score | Goals (home) | Goals (away) |
|---|---|---|---|---|---|---|---|
| 1 | 1941–42 | QF | **Sporting** | Benfica | **4–0** | João Cruz (6), Peyroteo (42), Manuel Soeiro (53), Pireza (75) | |
| 2 | 1942–43 | SF | Sporting | **Benfica** | **2–3** | Carlos Canário (33), João Cruz (50 p.) | Francisco Pires (10, 65), Joaquim Teixeira (44) |
| 3 | 1944–45 | SF (1st leg) | Sporting | **Benfica** | **1–2** | Jesus Correia (78) | Joaquim Alcobia (3), Julinho (30) |
| 4 | 1944–45 | SF (2nd leg) | Benfica | **Sporting** | **2–3** | Espírito Santo (41), Francisco Ferreira (90) | Peyroteo (2, 68), Jesus Correia (65) |
| 5 | 1944–45 | SF (Replay) | **Sporting** | Benfica | **1–0** | Albano (67) | |
| 6 | 1947–48 | SF | **Sporting** | Benfica | **3–0** | Peyroteo (51, 85), Albano (75) | |
| 7 | 1951–52 | F | **Benfica** | Sporting | **5–4** | Rogério Pipi (11 p., 69, 90), Corona (49), José Águas (49) | Albano (9 p.), Rola (51, 71), João Martins (55) |
| 8 | 1953–54 | L16 (1st leg) | **Sporting** | Benfica | **3–2** | Galileu (37), Travassos (82 p.), Fernando Mendonça (88) | Arsénio (34), Francisco Calado (77 p.) |
| 9 | 1953–54 | L16 (2nd leg) | **Benfica** | Sporting | **2–1** | Salvador Martins (36), Arsénio (71) | Francisco Calado (2 o.g.) |
| 10 | 1953–54 | L16 (Replay) | **Sporting** | Benfica | **4–2** | Travassos (12 p.), Manuel Vasques (74), Albano (76), João Martins (87) | Arsénio (1, 30) |
| 11 | 1954–55 | F | **Benfica** | Sporting | **2–1** | Arsénio (63, 65) | João Martins (47) |
| 12 | 1958–59 | SF (1st leg) | **Sporting** | Benfica | **2–1** | Faustino Pinto (37), Vadinho (57) | Santana (41) |
| 13 | 1958–59 | SF (2nd leg) | **Benfica** | Sporting | **3–1** | Mário João (34), Cavém (37), Santana (40) | Diego Arizaga (65) |
| 14 | 1959–60 | SF (1st leg) | **Sporting** | Benfica | **3–0** | Hugo Sarmento (55), Diego Arizaga (73), Juan Seminario (82) | |
| 15 | 1959–60 | SF (2nd leg) | Benfica | Sporting | **0–0** | | |
| 16 | 1962–63 | SF (1st leg) | Sporting | **Benfica** | **0–1** | | José Águas (6) |
| 17 | 1962–63 | SF (2nd leg) | Benfica | **Sporting** | **0–2** | | Ernesto de Figueiredo (45, 48) |
| 18 | 1969–70 | F | **Benfica** | Sporting | **3–1** | Artur Jorge (14), Torres (50), Simões (63) | Peres (83) |
| 19 | 1970–71 | F | **Sporting** | Benfica | **4–1** | Dinis (5), Nélson (23), Peres (33, 71) | Eusébio (24 p.) |
| 20 | 1971–72 | F | **Benfica** | Sporting | **3–2** (a.e.t.) | Eusébio (19, 70, 118) | Peres (51 p.), Dinis (61) |
| 21 | 1973–74 | F | **Sporting** | Benfica | **2–1** | Chico Faria (89), Marinho (107) | Nené (32) |
| 22 | 1975–76 | L32 | **Sporting** | Benfica | **1–0** (a.e.t.) | Libânio (115) | |
| 23 | 1976–77 | L16 | **Sporting** | Benfica | **3–0** | Manoel (10, 52, 57) | |
| 24 | 1977–78 | QF | **Sporting** | Benfica | **3–1** | Manuel Fernandes (13, 35), Keïta (55) | Humberto Coelho (81) |
| 25 | 1979–80 | L16 | **Benfica** | Sporting | **2–1** | Reinaldo (49), Nené (53) | Jordão (69 p.) |
| 26 | 1982–83 | QF | **Benfica** | Sporting | **3–0** | Chalana (28), Diamantino (30), Carlos Manuel (70) | |
| 27 | 1983–84 | L16 | **Sporting** | Benfica | **2–1** | Jordão (59), Manuel Fernandes (79) | Carlos Manuel (8) |
| 28 | 1985–86 | QF | **Benfica** | Sporting | **5–0** | Rui Águas (11), Wando (40, 90), Álvaro Magalhães (84) Manniche (86 p.) | |
| 29 | 1986–87 | F | **Benfica** | Sporting | **2–1** | Diamantino (39, 55) | Marlon Brandão (79) |
| 30 | 1995–96 | F | **Benfica** | Sporting | **3–1** | Mauro Airez (9), João Pinto (39, 67) | Carlos Xavier (83 p.) |
| 31 | 1999–2000 | L16 | Benfica | **Sporting** | **1–3** | Uribe (33) | Acosta (11, 74), André Cruz (36) |
| 32 | 2004–05 | L16 | Benfica | Sporting | **3–3** (7–6 p.) | Geovanni (3, 22), Simão (118) | Hugo Viana (15), Liédson (17), Paíto (110) |
| 33 | 2007–08 | SF | **Sporting** | Benfica | **5–3** | Yannick Djaló (68, 84), Liédson (76), Derlei (79), Vukčević (90) | Rui Costa (18), Nuno Gomes (31), Cristian Rodríguez (82) |
| 34 | 2013–14 | L32 | **Benfica** | Sporting | **4–3** (a.e.t.) | Cardozo (12, 42, 45), Luisão (97) | Diego Capel (37), Maurício (62), Slimani (90+2) |
| 35 | 2015–16 | L32 | **Sporting** | Benfica | **2–1** (a.e.t.) | Adrien Silva (45+2), Slimani (112) | Mitroglou (6) |
| 36 | 2018–19 | SF (1st leg) | **Benfica** | Sporting | **2–1** | Gabriel (16), Tiago Ilori (64 o.g.) | Bruno Fernandes (82) |
| 37 | 2018–19 | SF (2nd leg) | **Sporting** | Benfica | **1–0** | Bruno Fernandes (75) | |
| 38 | 2023–24 | SF (1st leg) | **Sporting** | Benfica | **2–1** | Gonçalves (9), Gyökeres (54) | Aursnes (68) |
| 39 | 2023–24 | SF (2nd leg) | Benfica | Sporting | **2–2** | Otamendi (52), Rafa Silva (64) | Hjulmand (47), Paulinho (55) |
| 40 | 2024–25 | F | Benfica | **Sporting** | **1–3** (a.e.t.) | Kökçü (47) | Gyökeres (90+11 p.), Harder (99), Trincão (120+1) |

=== Head-to-head results ===
| Benfica wins | 16 |
| Draws | 3 |
| Sporting wins | 21 |
| Benfica goals | 68 |
| Sporting goals | 81 |
| Total matches | 40 |

| Team | Home wins | Home draws | Home losses | Other venue wins |
|---|---|---|---|---|
| Benfica | 8 | 3 | 3 | 6 |
| Sporting | 15 | 0 | 2 | 3 |

== League Cup matches ==
The matches listed below are only Taça da Liga matches; club name in bold indicates win. The score is given at full-time; in the goals columns, the goalscorer and time when goal was scored is noted.

Team won the competition that season

| # | Season | R. | Home team | Away team | Score | Goals (home) | Goals (away) |
|---|---|---|---|---|---|---|---|
| 1 | 2008–09 | F | Benfica | Sporting | **1–1** (3–2 p.) | Reyes (75 p.) | Pereirinha (49) |
| 2 | 2009–10 | SF | Sporting | **Benfica** | **1–4** | Liédson (37) | David Luiz (8), Ramires (30), Luisão (68), Cardozo (90) |
| 3 | 2010–11 | SF | **Benfica** | Sporting | **2–1** | Cardozo (34), Javi García (90+1) | Hélder Postiga (21) |
| 4 | 2021–22 | F | Benfica | **Sporting** | **1–2** | Everton (23) | Inácio (49), Sarabia (78) |
| 5 | 2024–25 | F | Sporting | **Benfica** | **1–1** (6–7 p.) | Gyökeres (42 p.) | Schjelderup (29) |

=== Head-to-head results ===
| Benfica wins | 2 |
| Draws | 2 |
| Sporting wins | 1 |
| Benfica goals | 9 |
| Sporting goals | 6 |
| Total matches | 5 |

| Team | Home wins | Home draws | Home losses |
|---|---|---|---|
| Benfica | 1 | 0 | 0 |
| Sporting | 0 | 0 | 1 |

== Super Cup matches ==
The matches listed below are only Supertaça Cândido de Oliveira matches; club name in bold indicates win. The score is given at full-time; in the goals columns, the goalscorer and time when goal was scored is noted.

Team won the competition that season

| # | Season | R. | Home team | Away team | Score | Goals (home) | Goals (away) |
|---|---|---|---|---|---|---|---|
| 1 | 1980 | 1st leg | Sporting | Benfica | 2–2 | Jordão (59 p., 67) | Carlos Manuel (10), César (42) |
| 2 | 1980 | 2nd leg | **Benfica** | Sporting | 2–1 | Nené (43), Vital (86) | Jordão (22 p.) |
| 3 | 1987 | 1st leg | Benfica | **Sporting** | 0–3 | | Edmundo (20 o.g.), Silvinho (72), Paulinho Cascavel (78) |
| 4 | 1987 | 2nd leg | **Sporting** | Benfica | 1–0 | Silvinho (20) | |
| 5 | 2015 | F | Benfica | **Sporting** | 0–1 | | Teo Gutiérrez (53) |
| 6 | 2019 | F | **Benfica** | Sporting | 5–0 | Rafa Silva (40), Pizzi (60, 75), Grimaldo (64), Chiquinho (90) | |
| 7 | 2025 | F | Sporting | **Benfica** | 0–1 | | Pavlidis (50) |

=== Head-to-head results ===
| Benfica wins | 3 |
| Draws | 1 |
| Sporting wins | 3 |
| Benfica goals | 10 |
| Sporting goals | 8 |
| Total matches | 7 |

| Team | Home wins | Home draws | Home losses | Other venue wins |
|---|---|---|---|---|
| Benfica | 1 | 0 | 1 | 2 |
| Sporting | 1 | 1 | 0 | 1 |

== Championship of Portugal matches ==
Championship of Portugal meetings.

Team won the competition that season

| # | Season | R. | Home team | Away team | Score | Goals (home) | Goals (away) |
|---|---|---|---|---|---|---|---|
| 1 | 1933–34 | SF (1st leg) | Sporting | Benfica | 3–2 | Vasco Nunes (20, 29), Manuel Soeiro (44) | Carlos Torres (11), Vítor Silva (51) |
| 2 | 1933–34 | SF (2nd leg) | Benfica | Sporting | 0–0 | | |
| 3 | 1934–35 | F | Benfica | Sporting | 2–1 | António Lucas (45), Alfredo Valadas (55) | Manuel Soeiro (41) |
| 4 | 1936–37 | SF (1st leg) | Benfica | Sporting | 3–2 | Espírito Santo (20), Luís Xavier (43), Rogério de Sousa (50) | João Cruz (70), Manuel Soeiro (79) |
| 5 | 1936–37 | SF (2nd leg) | Sporting | Benfica | 4–2 | Pedro Pireza (34), Mário Galvão (47), Adolfo Mourão (64), João Cruz (67) | Rogério de Sousa (24), Alfredo Valadas (78 p.) |
| 6 | 1937–38 | F | Sporting | Benfica | 3–1 | Adolfo Mourão (12), Manuel Soeiro (15, 54) | Alfredo Valadas (70 p.) |

=== Head-to-head results ===
| Benfica wins | 2 |
| Draws | 1 |
| Sporting wins | 3 |
| Benfica goals | 10 |
| Sporting goals | 13 |
| Total matches | 6 |

| Team | Home wins | Home draws | Home losses | Other venue wins |
|---|---|---|---|---|
| Benfica | 2 | 1 | 0 | 1 |
| Sporting | 3 | 0 | 0 | 0 |

== Reserve team matches ==
Benfica B and Sporting B were established in the late 90s. They folded following the end of the 2005–06 season and were re-established in 2012 to compete starting from the 2012–13 Segunda Liga.

In 2018, Sporting B were again extinct after their relegation in the 2017–18 LigaPro.

| # | Season | R. | Home team | Away team | Score | Goals (home) | Goals (away) |
|---|---|---|---|---|---|---|---|
| 1 | 2000–01 | 5 | Benfica B | Sporting B | 0–1 | | Chiquinho (50) |
| 2 | 2000–01 | 24 | Sporting B | Benfica B | 4–0 | Paulo Teixeira (71, 76 p.), Vasco Matos (83, 90) | |
| 3 | 2001–02 | 16 | Sporting B | Benfica B | 2–0 | Mateus (33), Osório Carvalho (90) | |
| 4 | 2001–02 | 35 | Benfica B | Sporting B | 1–0 | Hélder Ramos (36) | |
| 5 | 2012–13 | 12 | Benfica B | Sporting B | 1–3 | João Cancelo (76) | Diego Rubio (17), Eric Dier (62), Gaël Etock (85) |
| 6 | 2012–13 | 33 | Sporting B | Benfica B | 1–3 | Cristian Ponde (18) | Miguel Rosa (31), Diogo Rosado (45), Alan Kardec (71) |
| 7 | 2013–14 | 20 | Benfica B | Sporting B | 3–1 | Rogelio Funes Mori (54), Steven Vitória (71), Rúben Pinto (81) | Mauro Riquicho (44) |
| 8 | 2013–14 | 41 | Sporting B | Benfica B | 1–1 | Iuri Medeiros (8) | Hélder Costa (25) |
| 9 | 2014–15 | 21 | Sporting B | Benfica B | 0–1 | | Fábio Cardoso (3) |
| 10 | 2014–15 | 44 | Benfica B | Sporting B | 0–0 | | |
| 11 | 2015–16 | 19 | Benfica B | Sporting B | 1–0 | Nuno Santos (72) | |
| 12 | 2015–16 | 42 | Sporting B | Benfica B | 2–1 | Matheus Pereira (21, 54 p.) | Šaponjić (90+4) |
| 13 | 2016–17 | 19 | Benfica B | Sporting B | 0–0 | | |
| 14 | 2016–17 | 40 | Sporting B | Benfica B | 2–2 | Gelson (20), Leonardo Acevedo (64) | José Gomes (45, 75) |
| 15 | 2017–18 | 16 | Benfica B | Sporting B | 2–0 | Heriberto (16), Ferro (27) | Cristian Ponde (49) |
| 16 | 2017–18 | 35 | Sporting B | Benfica B | 1–2 | Pedro Marques (24) | Kalaica (32), Heriberto (64) |
| 17 | 2025–26 | 15 | Benfica B | Sporting B | 1–0 | Diogo Prioste (34 p.) | |
| 18 | 2025–26 | 32 | Sporting B | Benfica B | 0–1 | | Diogo Prioste (62) |

=== Head-to-head results ===
| Benfica B wins | 9 |
| Draws | 4 |
| Sporting B wins | 5 |
| Benfica B goals | 16 |
| Sporting B goals | 17 |
| Total matches | 18 |

| Team | Home wins | Home draws | Home losses |
|---|---|---|---|
| Benfica B | 5 | 2 | 2 |
| Sporting B | 3 | 2 | 4 |

== All-time head-to-head results ==
As of match played 19 April 2026

This section does not include exhibition matches and results between reserve teams.

| Benfica wins | 140 |
| Draws | 71 |
| Sporting wins | 116 |
| Benfica goals | 548 |
| Sporting goals | 498 |
| Total matches | 327 |

| Team | Home wins | Home draws | Home losses | Other venue wins |
|---|---|---|---|---|
| Benfica | 87 | 38 | 33 | 6 |
| Sporting | 78 | 31 | 45 | 4 |

== Records and statistics ==
=== Benfica ===
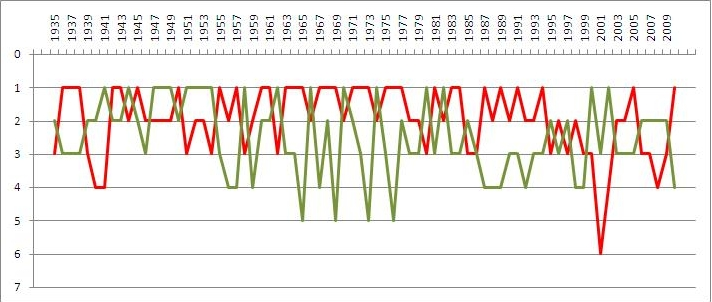
Chart showing the finishing league positions of Benfica (red) and Sporting (green) between the 1934–35 and 2009–10 seasons

- Benfica's biggest home win: Benfica 7–2 Sporting (28 April 1948)
- Benfica 5–0 Sporting (3 December 1939)
- Benfica 5–0 Sporting (19 November 1978)
- Benfica 5–0 Sporting (12 March 1986)
- Benfica's biggest away win: Sporting 0–4 Benfica (27 February 1910)
- Benfica's most consecutive wins: 8 (25 October 1908 – 10 March 1912)
- Benfica's longest undefeated run: 14 (25 October 1908 – 17 January 1915)
- Benfica's most consecutive losses: 5 (5 October 1952 – 23 May 1954)
- Benfica's most consecutive matches without winning: 5 (29 November 1980 – 2 January 1983)

=== Sporting ===
- Sporting's biggest home win: Sporting 7–1 (14 December 1986)
- Sporting's biggest away win: Benfica 0–5 Sporting (18 October 1936)
- Benfica 0–5 Sporting (14 December 1941)
- Sporting's most consecutive wins: 5 (5 October 1952 – 23 May 1954)
- Sporting's longest undefeated run: 5 (29 November 1980 – 2 January 1983)
- Sporting's most consecutive losses: 8 (25 October 1908 – 10 March 1912)
- Sporting's most consecutive matches without winning: 14 (25 October 1908 – 17 January 1915)

=== Top goalscorers ===
| Rank | Player | Nationality | Years | Goals | Ref. |
|---|---|---|---|---|---|
| 1 | Fernando Peyroteo | Portugal | 1937–1948 | 48 | |
| 2 | Eusébio | Portugal | 1962–1973 | 27 | |
| 3 | Alfredo Valadas | Portugal | 1931–1943 | 24 | |
| 4 | Adolfo Mourão | Portugal | 1929–1944 | 19 | |
| 5 | Nené | Portugal | 1970–1985 | 17 | |
| 6 | José Águas | Portugal | 1950–1963 | 16 | |
| 6 | Guilherme Espírito Santo | Portugal | 1936–1948 | 16 | |
| 8 | Rui Jordão | Portugal | 1974–1984 | 15 | |
| 8 | Manuel Soeiro | Portugal | 1934–1942 | 15 | |
| 10 | Albano | Portugal | 1943–1954 | 14 | |
| 10 | Arsénio Duarte | Portugal | 1944–1955 | 14 | |

== Players who played for both clubs ==
- (Portugal) Cândido Rosa Rodrigues: Benfica 1904–07; Sporting 1907–14
- (Portugal) António Rosa Rodrigues: Benfica 1904–07, 1909–10; Sporting 1907–08, 1910–16
- (Portugal) António do Couto: Benfica 1904–07; Sporting 1907–11
- (Portugal) Daniel Augusto de Queiroz dos Santos: Benfica 1906–07; Sporting 1907–09
- (Portugal) Emílio Silva de Carvalho: Benfica 1905–07; Sporting 1907–09
- (Portugal) Henrique Costa: Benfica 1906–07, 1908–16, 1917-18; Sporting 1907–08
- (Portugal) Francisco dos Santos: Benfica 1904–05; Sporting 1908–11
- (Portugal) José Rosa Rodrigues: Benfica 1904–05; Sporting 1908–09
- (Portugal) Fortunato Monteiro Levy: Benfica 1904–07; Sporting 1908–09
- (Portugal) Jorge Rosa Rodrigues: Benfica 1910–11; Sporting 1912–14
- (Portugal) Boaventura da Silva: Benfica 1910–14; Sporting 1914–21
- (Portugal) Jayme de Sousa Cadete: Sporting 1910–14, 1915–18; Benfica 1914–15
- (Portugal) Augusto Paiva Simões: Benfica 1910–14, 1918-19; Sporting 1914–17
- (Portugal) Carlos Burnay da Cruz Sobral: Sporting 1911–12; Benfica 1915–19
- (Portugal) Artur José Pereira: Benfica 1907–14; Sporting 1914–19
- (Portugal) Alberto Rio: Benfica 1908–18; Sporting 1918–19
- (Portugal) Artur Dyson dos Santos: Benfica 1928–29; Sporting 1931–36
- (Portugal) José Luís: Benfica 1931–32; Sporting 1932–33
- (Portugal) José Belo: Benfica 1929–31; Sporting 1933–34
- (Portugal) Alfredo Valadas: Sporting 1931–33; Benfica 1934–44
- (Portugal) Pedro Ferreira: Benfica 1928–31, 1937–38; Sporting 1935–37
- (Portugal) Joaquim Alcobia: Sporting 1935–36; Benfica 1936–44
- (Portugal) António Martins: Sporting 1936–38; Benfica 1938–45
- (Portugal) Rui Sousa Carneiro: Sporting 1934–36; Benfica 1939–40
- (Portugal) Mário Galvão: Sporting 1935–40; Benfica 1941–43
- (Portugal) Manuel Alberto Vieira: Sporting 1950–51; Benfica 1952–55
- (Portugal) António Lourenço: Benfica 1949–51; Sporting 1953–56
- (Portugal) Zé Rita: Sporting 1952–55; Benfica 1962–65
- (Portugal) Mascarenhas: Benfica 1958–59; Sporting 1962–64
- (Portugal) José Barroca: Benfica 1959–63; Sporting 1963–70
- (Portugal) José Ferreira Pinto: Sporting 1958–62; Benfica 1965–68
- (Portugal) José Pérides: Sporting 1956–60, 1961–64; Benfica 1964–66
- (Portugal) Pedras: Benfica 1962–66; Sporting 1968–71
- (Portugal) Nélson Fernandes: Benfica 1965–68; Sporting 1969–76
- (Portugal) Rui Jordão: Benfica 1971–76; Sporting 1977–87
- (Portugal) Carlos Alhinho: Sporting 1972–75; Benfica 1976–77, 1978–81
- (Portugal) Artur Correia: Benfica 1971–77; Sporting 1977–79, 1979–80
- (Portugal) António Botelho: Sporting 1970–74, 1977–79; Benfica 1979–82
- (Portugal) António Fidalgo: Benfica 1970–73, 1975–76, 1977–79; Sporting 1979–83
- (Portugal) João Laranjeira: Sporting 1970–79; Benfica 1979–82
- (Portugal) Eurico Gomes: Benfica 1975–79; Sporting 1979–82
- (Portugal) Romeu Silva: Benfica 1975–77; Sporting 1983–86
- (Portugal) Carlos Manuel: Benfica 1979–87; Sporting 1988–90
- (Portugal) Fernando Mendes: Sporting 1985–89; Benfica 1989–91, 1992–93
- (Portugal) Paulo Futre: Sporting 1983–84; Benfica 1993
- (Portugal) António Pacheco: Benfica 1987–93; Sporting 1993–95
- (Portugal) Paulo Sousa: Benfica 1989–93; Sporting 1993–94
- (Portugal) Amaral: Sporting 1988–94; Benfica 1994–95
- (Portugal) Marinho: Sporting 1989–95; Benfica 1995–97
- (Portugal) José Dominguez: Benfica 1992–94; Sporting 1995–97
- (Portugal) Hugo Porfírio: Sporting 1992–97; Benfica 1998–2000, 2001–04
- (Portugal) Jorge Cadete: Sporting 1987–95; Benfica 1999–2003
- (Portugal) João Pinto: Benfica 1992–2000; Sporting 2000–04
- (Portugal) Dimas Teixeira: Benfica 1994–96; Sporting 2000–02
- (Portugal) Paulo Bento: Benfica 1994–96; Sporting 2000–04
- (Portugal) Dani: Sporting 1995–97; Benfica 2000
- (Portugal) Bruno Caires: Benfica 1994–97; 2000–04
- (Portugal) Rui Bento: Benfica 1991–92; Sporting 2001–04
- (Portugal) Marco Caneira: Sporting 1996–2000, 2006–07 (loan), 2008–11; Benfica 2001–02 (loan)
- (Portugal) Simão Sabrosa: Sporting 1997–99; Benfica 2001–07
- (Portugal) Emílio Peixe: Sporting 1991–95, 1996–97; Benfica 2002–03
- (Brazil) Derlei: Benfica 2007 (loan); Sporting 2007–09
- (Portugal) Carlos Martins: Sporting 2000–07; Benfica 2008–14
- (Portugal) Maniche: Benfica 1995–96, 1999–2002; Sporting 2010–11
- (Portugal) João Pereira: Benfica 2003–06; Sporting 2010–12, 2015–16, 2021
- (Portugal) Yannick Djaló: Sporting 2005–11; Benfica 2012–16
- (Brazil) Bruno César: Benfica 2011–13; Sporting 2015–18
- (Peru) André Carrillo: Sporting 2011–16; Benfica 2016–19
- (Serbia) Lazar Marković: Benfica 2013–14; Sporting 2016–17 (loan)
- (Portugal) Fábio Coentrão: Benfica 2007–11; Sporting 2017–18 (loan)
- (Portugal) Nuno Santos: Benfica 2015–17; Sporting 2020–present
- (Portugal) João Mário: Sporting 2011–16, 2020–21 (loan); Benfica 2021–24
- (Portugal) Bruma: Sporting 2012–13; Benfica 2025–26
- (Portugal) João Palhinha: Sporting 2016–22; Benfica 2026–present

== Coaches who managed both clubs ==
- (England) Arthur John: Benfica 1929–31; Sporting 1931–33
- (Brazil) Otto Glória: Benfica 1954–59, 1968–1970; Sporting 1961, 1965–66
- (Portugal) Fernando Caiado: Benfica 1962; Sporting 1967–69
- (Chile) Fernando Riera: Benfica 1962–63, 1966–68; Sporting 1974–75
- (England) Jimmy Hagan: Benfica 1970–73; Sporting 1976–77
- (Socialist Federal Republic of Yugoslavia) Milorad Pavić: Benfica 1974–75; Sporting 1978–79
- (Portugal) Manuel José: Sporting 1985–86, 1990; Benfica 1997
- (Portugal) Fernando Santos: Sporting 2003–04; Benfica 2006–07
- (Portugal) Jesualdo Ferreira: Benfica 2002; Sporting 2013
- (Portugal) Jorge Jesus: Benfica 2009–15, 2020–21; Sporting 2015–18
- (Portugal) Marco Silva: Sporting 2014–15; Benfica 2026–present

== Women's matches ==
The first women's official derby was played on 19 October 2019 for matchday 3 of the 2019–20 National Championship. Benfica beat Sporting 3–0 at the Estádio da Luz, and the overall attendance record for a women's match in Portugal was surpassed with 12,812 spectators in the stands. The current attendance record is 27,221 spectators, set on 26 March 2023 at Estádio da Luz.

=== Head-to-head results ===
==== National championship ====
Team won the competition that season

| # | Season | R. | Home team | Away team | Score | Goals (home) | Goals (away) |
|---|---|---|---|---|---|---|---|
| 1 | 2019–20 | 3 | Benfica | Sporting | 3–0 | Nycole Raysla (27), Darlene (78, 90+3) | |
| 2 | 2019–20 | 15 | Sporting | Benfica | 3–2 | Nevena Damjanović (25 p.), Raquel Fernandes (29), Diana Silva (90) | Julia Spetsmark (15), Cloé Lacasse (64) |
| 3 | 2020–21 | 7 (FS) | Benfica | Sporting | 0–3 | | Ana Capeta (37, 54), Raquel Fernandes (85) |
| 4 | 2020–21 | 7 (SS) | Benfica | Sporting | 0–1 | | Carolina Mendes (7) |
| 5 | 2020–21 | 14 (SS) | Sporting | Benfica | 0–3 | | Nycole Raysla (5), Cloé Lacasse (83), Kika Nazareth (87 p.) |
| 6 | 2021–22 | 2 (FS) | Sporting | Benfica | 5–1 | Brenda Pérez (10), Joana Marchão (38 p.), Joana Martins (47), Diana Silva (61, 79) | Valéria Cantuário (45+8) |
| 7 | 2021–22 | 5 | Sporting | Benfica | 0–1 | | Jéssica Silva (74) |
| 8 | 2021–22 | 12 | Benfica | Sporting | 3–1 | Carole Costa (4), Andreia Faria (12), Ana Vitória (75) | Fátima Pinto (90+8) |
| 9 | 2022–23 | 6 | Sporting | Benfica | 1–2 | Cláudia Neto (65 p.) | Cloé Lacasse (47), Valéria Cantuário (89) |
| 10 | 2022–23 | 17 | Benfica | Sporting | 0–1 | | Maiara Niehues (63) |
| 11 | 2023–24 | 8 | Benfica | Sporting | 1–3 | Carole Costa (45+2 p.) | Diana Silva (1), Cláudia Neto (27), Ana Capeta (62) |
| 12 | 2023–24 | 19 | Sporting | Benfica | 3–1 | Brittany Raphino (28), Joana Martins (45+1), Olivia Smith (74) | Carole Costa (54 p.) |
| 13 | 2024–25 | 4 | Sporting | Benfica | 0–2 | | Cristina Martín-Prieto (34), Nycole Raysla (48) |
| 14 | 2024–25 | 15 | Benfica | Sporting | 1–1 | Cristina Martín-Prieto (17) | Maiara Niehues (6) |
| 13 | 2025–26 | 4 | Sporting | Benfica | 1–1 | Telma Encarnação (89 p.) | Nycole Raysla (21) |
| 14 | 2025–26 | 15 | Benfica | Sporting | 3–1 | Marit Lund (5), Carole Costa (45+5 p.), Chandra Davidson (88) | Mackenzie Cherry (44) |

==== Portuguese Cup ====
Team won the competition that season

| # | Season | R. | Home team | Away team | Score | Goals (home) | Goals (away) |
|---|---|---|---|---|---|---|---|
| 1 | 2022–23 | QF | Benfica | Sporting | 5–0 | Jéssica Silva (15, 18), Ana Vitória (38, 52), Christy Ucheibe (76) | |
| 2 | 2023–24 | SF (1st leg) | Benfica | Sporting | 1–0 | Carole Costa (33) | |
| 3 | 2023–24 | SF (2nd leg) | Sporting | Benfica | 1–1 | Olivia Smith (49) | Jéssica Silva (14) |
| 4 | 2024–25 | QF | Benfica | Sporting | 3–2 | Marie-Yasmine Alidou (45+1), Nycole Raysla (60), Lúcia Alves (83) | Telma Encarnação (35, 45+3) |

==== League Cup ====
Team won the competition that season

| # | Season | R. | Home team | Away team | Score | Goals (home) | Goals (away) |
|---|---|---|---|---|---|---|---|
| 1 | 2019–20 | GS | Benfica | Sporting | 2–2 | Pauleta (39), Darlene (72 p.) | Nevena Damjanović (3 p.), Diana Silva (54) |
| 2 | 2020–21 | F | Sporting | Benfica | 1–2 | Bruna Costa (52) | Cloé Lacasse (4), Nycole Raysla (12 p.) |
| 3 | 2022–23 | SF | Benfica | Sporting | 4–1 | Cloé Lacasse (16, 42), Jéssica Silva (69), Kika Nazareth (77) | Chandra Davidson (55) |
| 4 | 2022–23 | SF | Sporting | Benfica | 2–4 | Ana Capeta (26, 53) | Jéssica Silva (39), Francisca Nazareth (50, 58), Marta Cintra (90) |
| 5 | 2023–24 | F | Benfica | Sporting | 1–0 | Chandra Davidson (84) | |
| 6 | 2024–25 | F | Benfica | Sporting | 2–1 | Laís Araújo (20), Carole Costa (88) | Diana Silva (9) |

==== Super Cup matches ====
| # | Season | R. | Home team | Away team | Score | Goals (home) | Goals (away) |
|---|---|---|---|---|---|---|---|
| 1 | 2021 | F | Benfica | Sporting | 0–2 | | Brenda Pérez (51) Joana Marchão (86) |
| 2 | 2022 | F | Benfica | Sporting | 4–1 (a.e.t.) | Francisca Nazareth (75), Ana Vitória (96 p., 107), Nycole Raysla (109) | Cláudia Neto (63 p.) |
| 3 | 2023 | F | Benfica | Sporting | 1–1 (3–0 pen.) | Francisca Nazareth (55) | Andrea Norheim (73) |
| 4 | 2024 | F | Benfica | Sporting | 1–2 | Cristina Martín-Prieto (27) | Telma Encarnação (78), Cláudia Neto (85) |

=== All-time head-to-head results ===
| Benfica wins | 16 |
| Draws | 5 |
| Sporting wins | 9 |
| Benfica goals | 55 |
| Sporting goals | 40 |
| Total matches | 30 |

| Team | Home wins | Home draws | Home losses | Other venue wins |
|---|---|---|---|---|
| Benfica | 8 | 2 | 4 | 4 |
| Sporting | 3 | 2 | 5 | 2 |

== See also ==
- O Clássico
- FC Porto–Sporting CP rivalry
- List of association football club rivalries in Europe
