= 1941–42 S.L. Benfica season =

Benfica
1941–42 season
- President: Augusto da Fonseca Júnior
- Head coach: János Biri
- Stadium: Estádio do Campo Grande
- Primeira Divisão: 1st
- Taça de Portugal: Quarter-Final
- Campeonato de Lisboa: 2nd
- Top goalscorer: League: Francisco Rodrigues (16); All: Francisco Rodrigues (25)
- Biggest win: Benfica 10–0 Os Fósforos (2 November 1941)
- Biggest defeat: Benfica 0–5 Sporting (14 December 1941)
Home colours	Away colours

The 1941–42 season was Sport Lisboa e Benfica's 38th season in existence and the club's 8th consecutive season in the top flight of Portuguese football, covering the period from 1 September 1941 to 30 June 1942. Benfica competed in the Primeira Divisão, the Taça de Portugal and in the Campeonato de Lisboa.

Benfica entered the season aiming to reclaim the major domestic titles after three years without a league championship. In the third season of Lippo Hertzka, the team strengthened its squad and began strongly, winning all pre-season friendlies and starting well in both the Campeonato de Lisboa and the Primeira Divisão. Despite losing the regional title to Sporting, Benfica recovered in the national league, overcoming mid-season setbacks to build a decisive lead and ultimately secure its fourth league championship with two matches remaining. The season ended with elimination in the quarter-finals of the Taça de Portugal following a Derby defeat to Sporting.

== Season summary ==
Benfica entered the season seeking to win its fourth league title, having failed to secure the championship in the previous three seasons, as well as to reclaim both the Taça de Portugal and the Campeonato de Lisboa, competitions it had been unable to defend in the preceding campaign. Hungarian coach János Biri remained in charge for his third year at the club. During the off-season, Alexandre Brito and Francisco Baptista departed for Unidos de Lisboa, while Manuel da Costa joined from Académica.

Before of the start of the Campeonato de Lisboa, Benfica played three friendlies against rivals Porto, Belenenses, and Sporting, winning all three matches. The team opened its Campeonato de Lisboa campaign with two victories over Carcavelinhos and Unidos de Lisboa, scoring eleven goals across both games. Benfica closed the month with a 2–2 away draw against Belenenses, ending the third matchday in second place, one point behind leaders Sporting.

Benfica opened December with a 10–0 victory over Os Fósforos, but on 9 December the team travelled to face Sporting in the Derby de Lisboa, losing 3–2 after having taken a two-goal lead into half-time. The squad reacted with five consecutive wins, including a 4–3 triumph over Belenenses, and entered the final matchday one point behind the leaders. In the decisive last round, Benfica hosted Sporting but were defeated 5–0, relinquishing the title.

Before the start of the Primeira Divisão, Benfica played two preparation matches, defeating both Belenenses and Vitória de Setúbal. The league campaign began with a 4–1 victory over Carcavelinhos, followed by wins against Académico F.C. and Unidos de Lisboa, placing the team at the top of the table after the third matchday, level on points with Barreirense and Belenenses.

On 8 February, Benfica suffered a 3–1 away defeat to Académica, but reacted with an 8–1 win over Olhanense. On 22 February, the team travelled to face Porto in O Clássico, losing 4–1 and ending the month in fifth place, two points behind league leaders Sporting. Benfica responded with two decisive wins, a 2–1 home victory against Belenenses on 1 March, followed by a 4–1 away win over Sporting in the season's first league Derby. The team closed March with three additional victories, finishing the month tied on points with Sporting at the top of the table.

In April, Benfica recorded four consecutive victories, scoring four goals in each match, which allowed the team to establish a four-point lead over second place. May began with a 3–2 away win against Olhanense, followed by a 5–1 home victory over Porto in the second O Clássico of the season, with Francisco Rodrigues scoring twice. The result preserved Benfica's four-point advantage at the top of the table.

On 17 May, the team played the first of two decisive fixtures, losing 4–0 away to Belenenses, which reduced its lead to two points. One week later, Benfica defeated Sporting 4–3 in a crucial league encounter, restoring a four-point gap with three matches remaining. The team closed the season with three additional victories, securing its fourth league title with two matches to spare.

After securing the league title, Benfica entered the Taça de Portugal, beginning with a 2–0 victory over Barreirense in the round of 16, which set up a fifth Derby de Lisboa of the season in the quarter-finals. One week later, the team travelled to face Sporting, losing 4–0 and being eliminated from the competition.

== Competitions ==
Win Draw Loss Postponed

=== Overall record ===
Competition	First match	Last match	Record								
Competition	First match	Last match	G	W	D	L	GF	GA	GD	Win %	Source
Primeira Divisão	18 January 1942	14 June 1942	22	19	0	3	74	34	+40	86.36	
Taça de Portugal	21 June 1942	28 June 1942	2	1	0	1	2	4	−2	50.00	
Campeonato de Lisboa	12 October 1942	14 December 1942	10	7	1	2	39	16	+23	70.00	
Total			34	27	1	6	115	54	+61	79.41	

=== Primeira Divisão ===
==== League table ====
Pos	Team	Pld	W	D	L	GF	GA	GD	Pts
1	Benfica (C)	22	19	0	3	74	34	+40	38
2	Sporting	22	17	0	5	93	31	+62	34
3	Belenenses	22	12	6	4	66	32	+34	30
4	Porto	22	13	2	7	77	48	+29	28
5	Académica	22	13	0	9	77	51	+26	26

Source: rsssf.com
(C) Champions

==== Results by round ====
Round	1	2	3	4	5	6	7	8	9	10	11	12	13	14	15	16	17	18	19	20	21	22
Ground	A	H	H	A	H	A	H	A	H	A	H	H	A	A	H	A	H	A	H	A	H	A
Result	W	W	W	L	W	L	W	W	W	W	W	W	W	W	W	W	W	L	W	W	W	W
Position	4	1	2	3	2	5	3	2	2	2	2	1	1	1	1	1	1	1	1	1	1	1

Source: ForaDeJogo
A = Away; H = Home; W = Win; D = Draw; L = Loss

==== Matches ====
18 January 1942 1	Carcavelinhos	1–4	Benfica	Lisbon
	Bernardo 89'		9' Valadas; 30' Costa; 78', 80' Teixeirinha

25 January 1942 2	Benfica	4–1	Académico F.C.	Lisbon
	Valadas 21'; Albino 23'; Teixeirinha 26'; Costa 80'		88' (pen.) Alcobia	Stadium: Estádio do Campo Grande; Referee: Vale Ramos

1 February 1942 3	Benfica	2–0	Unidos de Lisboa	Lisbon
	Barros 15', 30'			Stadium: Estádio do Campo Grande

8 February 1942 4	Académica	3–1	Benfica	Coimbra
	Armando 32', 44'; Nini 34'		45' Valadas

15 February 1942 5	Benfica	8–1	Olhanenses	Lisbon
	Barros 17'; Conceição 18', 67', 81'; Albino 20'; Costa 65', 72'; Murta 79' (pen.)		77' Gomes	Stadium: Estádio do Campo Grande

22 February 1942 6	Porto	4–1	Benfica	Porto
	Correia 13', 30', 42'; Santos 61'		89' Rodrigues	Stadium: Campo da Constituição; Referee: Vasco Ataíde

1 March 1942 7	Benfica	2–1	Belenenses	Lisbon
	Valadas 1'; Albino 15'		65' Franklim	Stadium: Estádio do Campo Grande

8 March 1942 8	Sporting	1–4	Benfica	Lisbon
	Araújo 65' (pen.)		42', 49' Rodrigues; 64' Teixeira; 77' Barros	Stadium: Stadium de Lisboa; Referee: Domingos Miranda

15 March 1942 9	Benfica	4–2	Vitória de Guimarães	Lisbon
	Teixeirinha 20'; Rodrigues 38', 50'; Pereira 70'		21', 69' Miguel	Stadium: Estádio do Campo Grande

22 March 1942 10	Barreirense	0–1	Benfica	Barreiro
			84' Teixeira

29 March 1942 11	Benfica	5–0	Leça F.C.	Lisbon
	Pereira 71'; Teixeira 72', 75'; Rodrigues 77'; Barros 89'			Stadium: Estádio do Campo Grande; Referee: Guilhermino Sarriá

5 April 1942 12	Benfica	4–0	Carcavelinhos	Lisbon
	Valadas 4'; Barros 33'; Pereira 38'; Albino 51'			Stadium: Estádio do Campo Grande

12 April 1942 13	Académico F.C.	2–4	Benfica	Porto
	Julinho 32'; Marques 79'		5' Valadas; 6', 41' Barros; 65' Teixeira	Stadium: Estádio do Lima; Referee: Álvaro Santos

19 April 1942 14	Unidos de Lisboa	2–4	Benfica	Lisbon
	Baptista 29', 60'		32', 85' Rodrigues; 50' Teixeira; 52' Valadas	Stadium: Campo Bairro Padre Cruz

26 April 1942 15	Benfica	4–1	Académica	Lisbon
	Teixeira 29'; Rodrigues 63'; Valadas 69', 90'		49' Armando	Stadium: Estádio do Campo Grande; Referee: Paulo de Oliveira

3 May 1942 16	Olhanense	2–3	Benfica	Olhão
	Santos 25'; Gomes 33'		17' (pen.) Galvão; 21' Rodrigues; 59' Teixeira	Stadium: Estádio Padinha; Referee: José Trindade

10 May 1942 17	Benfica	5–1	Porto	Lisbon
	Rodrigues 7', 43' (pen.); Costa 20'; Teixeira 47'; Valadas 77'		62' Pratas	Stadium: Estádio do Campo Grande; Referee: Álvaro Santos

10 May 1942 18	Belenenses	4–0	Benfica	Lisbon
	Gilberto 28', 52', 73'; Armando 81'			Stadium: Estádio José Manuel Soares; Referee: António Palhinhas

24 May 1942 19	Benfica	4–3	Sporting	Lisbon
	Ferreira 30'; Barros 43'; Rodrigues 48'; Valadas 55'		8' Pireza; 35' Soeiro; 39' Cruz	Stadium: Estádio do Campo Grande; Referee: António Palhinhas

31 May 1942 20	Vitória de Guimarães	1–2	Benfica	Guimarães
	Alexandre 18' (pen.)		65' Barros; 75' Rodrigues	Stadium: Campo do Benlhevai; Referee: Domingos Miranda

7 June 1942 21	Benfica	3–2	Barreirense	Lisbon
	Teixeira 12'; Rodrigues 18'; José Maria 35' (o.g.)		80', 81' Pereira	Stadium: Estádio do Campo Grande

14 June 1942 22	Leça FC	2–5	Benfica	Porto
	Chelas 20'; Lúcio 76'		4' Costa; 30' Valadas; 46' Rodrigues; 63' Barros; 73' Teixeira

=== Taça de Portugal ===
==== Round of 16 ====
21 June 1942	Barreirense	2–0	Benfica	Lisbon
	Barros 83'; Valadas 86'			Stadium: Estádio do Campo Grande

==== Quarter-Finals ====
28 June 1942	Sporting	4–0	Benfica	Lisbon
	Cruz 6'; Peyroteo 42'; Soeiro 53'; Pireza 75'			Stadium: Stadium de Lisboa; Referee: Vieira da Costa

=== Campeonato de Lisboa ===
Pos	Team	Pld	W	D	L	GF	GA	GD	Pts
1	Sporting (C)	10	7	1	2	53	13	+40	25
2	Benfica	10	5	1	4	23	18	+5	21
3	Belenenses	10	5	4	1	24	15	+9	24
4	Carcavelinhos	10	3	2	5	17	32	−15	18
5	Unidos de Lisboa	10	4	1	5	17	37	−20	19
6	Os Fósforos	10	1	1	8	9	28	−19	13

(C) Champions

12 October 1941 1	Benfica	7–0	Carcavelinhos	Lisbon
15:05	Valadas 20'; Conceição 25', 74'; Rodrigues 29', 35', 38'; Ferreira 55' (pen.)			Stadium: Estádio do Campo Grande; Referee: António Silva Pereira

19 October 1941 2	Unidos de Lisboa	1–4	Benfica	Lisbon
			16' Francisco Pires; 30' (pen.) Ferreira; 58' Rodrigues; 75' Conceição	Stadium: Campo Bairro Padre Cruz

26 October 1941 3	Belenenses	2–2	Benfica	Lisbon
15:10	Correia 15'; Franklim 68'		16' Pires; 67' Rodrigues	Stadium: Estádio José Manuel Soares; Referee: Domingos Godinho

2 November 1941 4	Benfica	10–0	Os Fósforos	Lisbon
	Conceição 5', 37', 80'; Pires 12'; Rodrigues 15', 38'; Teixeira 20', 77'; Ferreira 40'; Pinto 89'			Stadium: Estádio do Campo Grande; Referee: João Silva Júnior

9 November 1941 5	Sporting	3–2	Benfica	Lisbon
15:00	Canário 47'; Peyroteo 65'; Mourão 82'		32' Pires; 40' Rodrigues	Stadium: Stadium de Lisboa; Referee: Domingos Godinho

16 November 1941 6	Carcavelinhos	1–6	Benfica	Lisbon
			2' Conceição; 10', 46' Pereira; 27', 34' Pires; 48' Teixeira	Stadium: Estádio da Tapadinha; Referee: Silva Pereira

23 November 1941 7	Benfica	2–0	Unidos de Lisboa	Lisbon
	Conceição 13'; Pires 88'			Stadium: Estádio do Campo Grande; Referee: António de Almeida

30 November 1941 8	Benfica	4–3	Belenenses	Lisbon
	Rodrigues 26'; Conceição 51', 88'; Pires 75'			Stadium: Estádio do Campo Grande; Referee: Carlos Canuto

7 December 1941 9	Os Fósforos	1–2	Benfica	Lisbon
			42' Teixeira; 67' Pires	Stadium: Estádio Eng.º Carlos Salema; Referee: Armelim Martins

14 December 1941 10	Benfica	0–5	Sporting	Lisbon
15:00			18' Soeiro; 33', 81' Peyroteo; 75', 90' Cruz	Stadium: Estádio do Campo Grande; Referee: Vital da Sousa

=== Non-Official matches ===
21 September 1941; Tournament of the Four Best	Benfica	3–2	Porto	Lisbon
				Stadium: Campo das Salésias

28 September 1941; Tournament of the Four Best	Benfica	2–0	Belenenses	Lisbon
	Teixeira 26', 73'			Stadium: Campo das Salésias; Referee: Silva Pereira

5 October 1941 Inauguration of Campo Grande	Benfica	3–2	Sporting	Lisbon
	Costa 17'; Pires 42', 47'		9', 19' Peyroteo	Stadium: Campo do 28 de maio Referee: Carlos Canuto

4 January 1942	Benfica	2–0	CF Os Belenenses	Lisbon
	Costa 37'; Rodrigues 80'			Stadium: Estádio do Lumiar; Referee: José Andrade dos Santos

11 January 1942	Vitória de Setúbal	2–3	Benfica	Setúbal
				Stadium: Campo dos Arcos

== Player statistics ==
The squad for the season consisted of the players listed in the tables below, as well as staff member János Biri (manager).

Note 1: Note: Flags indicate national team as defined under FIFA eligibility rules. Players may hold more than one non-FIFA nationality.

Note 2: Players with squad numbers marked ‡ joined the club during the 1941-42 season via transfer, with more details in the following section.

No.	Pos	Nat	Player	Total		Primeira Divisão		Taça de Portugal		Campeonato de Lisboa	
No.	Pos	Nat	Player	Apps	Goals	Apps	Goals	Apps	Goals	Apps	Goals
1	GK	(Portugal) POR	António Martins	34	0	22	0	2	0	10	0
	DF	(Portugal) POR	Casimiro Tavares	2	0	2	0	0	0	0	0
	DF	(Portugal) POR	Francisco Elói	9	0	6	0	0	0	3	0
	DF	(Portugal) POR	Mário Galvão	14	1	8	1	0	0	6	0
2	DF	(Portugal) POR	Gaspar Pinto	32	1	20	0	2	0	10	1
3	DF	(Portugal) POR	Ricardo Freire	10	0	7	0	2	0	1	0
	MF	(Portugal) POR	Álvaro Pereira	9	5	7	3	0	0	2	2
	MF	(Portugal) POR	Joaquim Alcobia	19	0	9	0	0	0	10	0
4	MF	(Portugal) POR	César Ferreira	19	0	16	0	2	0	1	0
5	MF	(Portugal) POR	Francisco Albino	33	4	21	4	2	0	10	0
6	MF	(Portugal) POR	Francisco Ferreira	29	4	19	1	2	0	8	3
	MF	(Portugal) POR	Francisco Pires	10	9	0	0	0	0	10	9
	FW	(Portugal) POR	Guilherme Espírito Santo	0	0	0	0	0	0	0	0
	FW	(Portugal) POR	Miguel Lourenço	3	0	0	0	0	0	3	0
	FW	(Portugal) POR	Pessoa Duarte	1	0	0	0	0	0	1	0
	FW	(Portugal) POR	Rui Bettencourt	1	0	0	0	0	0	1	0
	FW	(Portugal) POR	Teixeirinha	6	4	6	4	0	0	0	0
7	FW	(Portugal) POR	Manuel da Costa	18	6	16	6	2	0	0	0
8	FW	(Portugal) POR	Nelo Barros	23	12	21	11	2	1	0	0
9	FW	(Portugal) POR	Francisco Rodrigues	29	25	18	16	2	0	9	9
10	FW	(Portugal) POR	Joaquim Teixeira	25	15	15	11	0	0	10	4
10	FW	(Portugal) POR	José da Conceição	18	13	7	3	2	0	9	10
11	FW	(Portugal) POR	Alfredo Valadas	30	14	22	12	2	1	6	1

== Transfers ==
=== In ===
Position	Player	From	Fee	Ref
FW	Manuel da Costa	Académica	Undisclosed	

=== Out ===
Position	Player	To	Fee	Ref
GR	Mário da Rosa	Operário Vilafranquense	Undisclosed	
MF	Francisco Baptista	Unidos Lisboa	Undisclosed	
FW	Alexandre Brito	Unidos de Lisboa	Undisclosed	
