= Miguel Lourenço (footballer, born 1920) =

Portuguese footballer

Personal information
- Date of birth: 7 February 1920
- Place of birth: Portugal
- Position: Outside forward

Senior career*
Years	Team	Apps	(Gls)
1939–1942	Benfica	19	(9)
1944–1953	Estoril	139	(75)
Total		158	(84)

International career
1946–1949	Portugal	2	(1)
- * Club domestic league appearances and goals

Miguel Lourenço (born 7 February 1920, date of death unknown) was a Portuguese footballer who played as an outside forward.

== Club career ==
Lourenço joined S.L. Benfica in 1939, going on to serve as back-up to both Alfredo Valadas and Guilherme Espírito Santo during his spell. He made his debut on 22 October 1939 in a 6–1 win over Carcavelinhos FC in the Campeonato de Lisboa, scoring his team's fourth goal in the 63rd minute. He would only reappear on 4 February 1940, when he took the place of Espírito Santo in a match against Leixões S.C. for the Primeira Divisão; despite failing to win the league, he helped the club to victory in the Taça de Portugal and the Lisbon Championship, netting ten times in the process.

In the following season, the 20-year old Lourenço all but appeared in the Portuguese Cup, featuring in just 12 league matches and scoring six goals as Benfica failed to win any silverware. In 1941–42, his playing time was further reduced as he only made three scoreless appearances in the Lisbon Championship.

Lourenço left the Estádio da Luz in 1942, signing for neighbouring club G.D. Estoril Praia two years later. He remained there until his retirement at the age of 33, eventually reaching the Portugal national team and earning two caps; in his second, on 27 February 1949, he opened an eventual 4–1 friendly defeat to Italy in Genoa.

== Honours ==
Benfica

- Taça de Portugal: 1939–40
- Campeonato de Lisboa: 1939–40
