= Leixões S.C. =

Sports club in Portugal

Leixões
- Full name: Leixões Sport Club
- Nicknames: Os Bebés (The Babies); Heróis do Mar (Heroes of the Sea)
- Founded: 28 November 1907; 118 years ago
- Stadium: Estádio do Mar
- Capacity: 6,000
- Owner(s): Play Fair (56,33%); Sílvia Carvalho (3,27%)
- President: António Jorge Ramos Moreira
- Head coach: Carlos Fangueiro
- League: Liga Portugal 2
- 2025–26: Liga Portugal 2, 7th of 18
- Website: leixoessad.pt
Home colours	Away colours

Leixões Sport Club (Portuguese pronunciation: [lɐjˈʃõjʃ]), commonly known as Leixões, is a Portuguese sports club from Matosinhos. It is organised into several departments for many sports, such as athletics, boxing, football, futsal, handball, karate, swimming, volleyball, water polo and billiards. It is best known for its professional football department, which hosts a B reserve team called Leixões S.C. B.

Leixões won the 1960–61 Taça de Portugal.

== History ==
Leixões Sport Club was founded in 1907, making them one of Portugal's oldest sports clubs in continuous operation. In 1961, they won their only Taça de Portugal, defeating Porto 2–0. This qualified Leixões to the 1961–62 European Cup Winners' Cup, in which they reached the quarter-finals before losing 4–2 on aggregate to the East German side Motor Jena. Leixões had their best top-flight league performance in 1962–63, finishing fifth, 12 points behind champions Benfica.

Present in the top-flight since 1959–60, Leixões were relegated on goal difference in the 1976–77 season. Apart from the 1988–89 season, Leixões did not play in the top-flight again until 2007.

In 2002, Leixões beat Braga 3–1 away to secure a place in the Taça de Portugal final (the first and only third division club to play a final) against Sporting CP. The club, however, lost 1–0, but nonetheless secured a spot in the following season's UEFA Cup and Portuguese Supercup after Sporting had also finished as national champions for the year. The following season, Leixões lost the Portuguese Supercup against Sporting CP by 5–1. That same year, Leixões lost 5–3 on aggregate to Greek side PAOK after winning the first leg 2–1 at home, thus suffering elimination in the first round of the UEFA Cup. They also romped to the Segunda Divisão B title with 94 points and with it they gained promotion to the Segunda Liga.

In 2004, they just avoided relegation back to Division Two and finished 14th. A year later, they battled to finish seventh in the league. Finally in 2006, they nearly reached the top-flight Primeira Liga, losing out to Desportivo das Aves in the promotion chase by finishing third, two points behind Aves. Third place used to merit a promotion, but due to a re-construction to all leagues, it meant only the top two would go up (Beira-Mar as champions and Aves as runners-up). Finally, in 2007, they gained promotion to the Liga, 18 years after their relegation. During this stint, which lasted three seasons, their best result was a sixth-place finish in 2008–09. Their last match in the Primeira Liga was a 1–0 away loss to Olhanense on 2 May 2010.

== Stadium ==
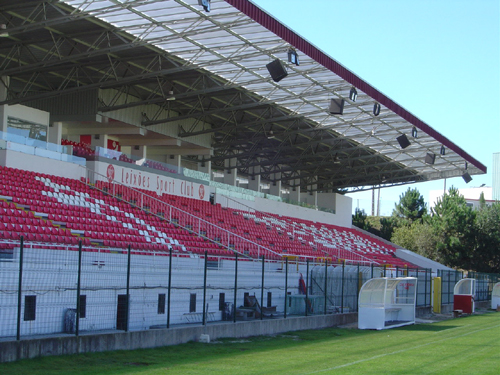
Estádio do Mar – Main stand.

Leixões' home ground, the Estádio do Mar, was inaugurated on 1 January 1964 with a match against Benfica, who won 4–0.

== Honours ==
- Taça de Portugal: 1

- 1960–61

- Segunda Liga: 1

- 2006–07

- Segunda Divisão: 1

- 1937–38

- Segunda Divisão B: 1

- 2002–03

- Campeonato do Porto: 1

- 1939–40

- Taça AF Porto: 1

- 1982–83

== Youth honours ==
- Nacional Juniores A 1ª Divisão(U19): 1
  - 1941–42
- AF Porto Jun.A 1ª Divisão(U19 B): 3
  - 2009–10, 2016–17, 2018–19
- AF Porto Juniores D T. Joaquim Piedade(U13): 1
  - 2010–11

== Players ==
=== Current squad ===
As of 16 September 2026

Note: Flags indicate national team as defined under FIFA eligibility rules; some limited exceptions apply. Players may hold more than one non-FIFA nationality.

No.	Pos.	Nation	Player
1	GK	BRA	Simão Bertelli
2	DF	POR	Fernando Fonseca
3	DF	POR	Lourenço
4	DF	BRA	Matheus Costa
6	MF	GBS	Amadu Baldé
7	FW	POR	Salvador Agra
8	MF	POR	Miguel Sousa
9	FW	POR	José Bica
10	MF	POR	Rafael Barbosa
14	DF	BRA	Alysson (on loan from Santa Clara)
15	DF	POR	Simãozinho
17	MF	BRA	Arthur Baggio
21	MF	ITA	Agustin De Armas
22	MF	POR	Cláudio Araújo
26	GK	BRA	Caio Secco

No.	Pos.	Nation	Player
30	DF	POR	Serif Nhaga
33	FW	BRA	Luccas Paraizo
35	FW	HON	Bryan Róchez
41	DF	BRA	Daniel Nolasco
44	DF	GHA	Semeu Commey
47	GK	POR	João Cardoso
51	GK	SRB	Igor Stefanović (captain)
63	DF	POR	Hugo Faria
71	FW	BRA	Kaique
77	DF	POR	Paulinho
79	FW	POR	Roka
80	MF	POR	João Assunção
83	DF	POR	António Gonçalves
88	FW	CPV	Rúben Pina
99	FW	NGR	Morufdeen Moshood

=== Out on loan ===
Note: Flags indicate national team as defined under FIFA eligibility rules; some limited exceptions apply. Players may hold more than one non-FIFA nationality.

No. / Pos. / Nation / Player; — / DF / POR / Joel Oliveira (at Trofense until 30 June 2027)	No. / Pos. / Nation / Player; — / FW / BRA / Werton (at Aris Limassol until 31 May 2027)

=== Notable former players ===
- (Portugal) António Frasco
- (Portugal) Álvaro Magalhães
- (Portugal) Frederico Rosa
- (Portugal) Ricardo Nascimento
- (Portugal) Rui Duarte
- (Portugal) Beto
- (Portugal) Jorge Gonçalves
- (Portugal) Diogo Valente
- (Portugal) Vieirinha
- (Portugal) Filipe Oliveira
- (Portugal) João Moreira
- (Portugal) Vítor Castanheira
- (Portugal) Nuno Laranjeiro
- (Portugal) Zé Manel
- (Portugal) Fernando Alexandre
- (Portugal) José Maria Pedroto (youth)
- (Argentina) Nelson Benítez
- (Austria) Hans-Peter Berger
- (Bosnia and Herzegovina) Nail Besirović
- (Brazil) Brasília
- (Brazil) Élvis
- (Brazil) Leandro Tatu
- (Brazil) Roberto
- (Brazil) Jaime
- (Brazil) Ezequias
- (Brazil) Derick Poloni
- (Brazil) Wesley
- (Brazil) Roberto Souza
- (Brazil) Chumbinho
- (Brazil) Wênio
- (Brazil) Tales Schutz
- (Burkina Faso) Hervé Zengue
- (Cameroon) Christian Pouga
- (Costa Rica) Brandon Poltronieri
- (Colombia) Brayan Angulo
- (France) Amine Oudrhiri
- (England) Phil Walker
- (England) Bill Roffey
- (Equatorial Guinea) Rubén Belima
- (Burkina Faso) Edmond Tapsoba
- (Greece) Anastasios Tsoumagas
- (Guinea-Bissau) Dionisio Mendes
- (Haiti) Jean Sony
- (Hong Kong) Detinho
- (Malta) Udo Nwoko
- (Vietnam) Lê Công Vinh

== Managerial history ==
- (Hungary) József Szabó (1957–1958)
- (Portugal) Óscar Marques (1960)
- (Argentina) José Valle (1960–1961)
- (Argentina) Filpo Nunez (1961)
- (Portugal) José Maria Pedroto (1964–1965)
- (Portugal) António Teixeira (1967–1970)
- (Portugal) António Teixeira (1972–1974)
- (Portugal) José Rachão (1982–1984)
- (Portugal) Acácio Casimiro (1986–1987)
- (Portugal) Henrique Calisto (1990–1991)
- (Portugal) Amândio Barreiras (1991)
- (Portugal) Manuel Barbosa (1991–1993)
- (Portugal) Nicolau Vaqueiro (1993)
- (Portugal) Vieira Nunes (1993–1994)
- (Portugal) Henrique Calisto (1994)
- (Portugal) Ruben Cunha (1994)
- (Portugal) Acácio Casimiro (1994–1995)
- (Portugal) Álvaro Carolino (1995)
- (Portugal) António Caldas (1996–1997)
- (Portugal) Ruben Cunha (1997–1998)
- (Bulgaria) Eduard Eranosyan (1998)
- (Portugal) Rúben Cunha (1998–1999)
- (Portugal) José Alberto Torres (1999–2000)
- (Portugal) António Pinto (June, 2000 – Jan 25, 2001)
- (Portugal) Adelino Teixeira (Jan 25, 2001 – May 26, 2001)
- (Portugal) Carlos Carvalhal (June 8, 2001 – Dec 9, 2002)
- (Portugal) Abílio Novais (Dec 12, 2002 – Nov 5, 2003)
- (Portugal) João Alves (Nov 5, 2003 – Jan 12, 2004)
- (Portugal) António Pinto (Jan 12, 2004 – May 12, 2004)
- (Portugal) José Gomes (June, 2004–May, 2005)
- (Portugal) Rogério Gonçalves (June 11, 2005 – Feb 21, 2006)
- (Portugal) Vítor Oliveira (Feb 22, 2006 – May 20, 2007)
- (Portugal) Carlos Brito (May 26, 2007 – Feb 9, 2008)
- (Portugal) António Pinto (Feb 9, 2008 – May 21, 2008)
- (Portugal) José Mota (May 21, 2008 – Feb 9, 2010)
- (Spain) Fernando Castro Santos (Feb 9, 2010 – May 8, 2010)
- (Portugal) Augusto Inácio (May 21, 2010 – Feb 13, 2011)
- (Portugal) Litos (Feb 16, 2011 – Feb 14, 2012)
- (Portugal) Horácio Gonçalves (Feb 15, 2012 – Nov 6, 2012)
- (Portugal) Pedro Correia (Nov 6, 2012 – Mar 3, 2014)
- (Portugal) Jorge Casquilha (Mar 6, 2014 – May 11, 2014)
- (Portugal) Horácio Gonçalves (July 1, 2014 – June 30, 2015)
- (Portugal) Manuel Monteiro (July 1, 2015 – Nov 22, 2015)
- (Portugal) Pedro Miguel (Nov 29, 2015 – Jun 30, 2016)
- (Portugal) Filipe Coelho (July 1, 2016 – Oct 30, 2016)
- (Portugal) Daniel Kenedy (Nov 13, 2016 – Aug 19, 2017)
- (Portugal) João Henriques (Aug 23, 2017 – Jan 6, 2018)
- (Portugal) Ricardo Malafaia (Jan 14, 2018 – Apr 7, 2018)
- (Portugal) Francisco Chaló (Apr 11, 2018 – Jun 30, 2018)
- (Portugal) Filipe Gouveia (Jul 1, 2018 – Dec 23, 2018)
- (Portugal) Bruno China (Dec 30, 2018)
- (Portugal) Jorge Casquilha (Jan 6, 2019 – Jun 30, 2019)
- (Portugal) Carlos Pinto (2019–2020)
- (Portugal) Manuel Cajuda (2020)
- (Portugal) Tiago Fernandes (2020)
- (Portugal) João Eusébio (2020–2021)
- (Portugal) José Mota (2021–2022)
- (Portugal) Vítor Martins (2022–2023)
- (Portugal) Pedro Ribeiro (2023–2024)
- (Portugal) Carlos Fangueiro (2024–2025)
- (Portugal) José Mota (2025)
- (Portugal) Cristiano Brito (2025)
- (Portugal) João Nuno Fonseca (2025)
- (Portugal) Fernando Valente (2025)
- (Portugal) Carlos Fangueiro (2025–)

== European record ==
Season	Competition	Round	Opponent	Home	Away	Aggregate
1961–62	European Cup Winners' Cup	PR	(Switzerland) Chaux Fonds	5–0	2–6	7–6
1961–62	European Cup Winners' Cup	1R	(Romania) Progresul București	1–1	1–0	2–1
1961–62	European Cup Winners' Cup	QF	(East Germany) Motor Jena	1–3	1–1	2–4
1964–65	Inter-Cities Fairs Cup	1R	(Scotland) Celtic	1–1	0–3	1–4
1968–69	Inter-Cities Fairs Cup	1R	(Romania) Argeș Pitești	1–1	0–0	1–1
2002–03	UEFA Cup	QR	(North Macedonia) Belasica	2–2	2–1	4–3
2002–03	UEFA Cup	1R	(Greece) PAOK	2–1	1–4	3–5

== League and cup history ==
The club has played 25 seasons at the top level of Portuguese football.

Season	Div	Pos.	Pl.	W	D	L	GS	GA	P	Cup	League Cup	Europe	Notes
1936–37	CL	8	14	2	0	12	19	69	4	1st round			the cup-style competition played was still the Portuguese Championship; until 1938, the league-style competitions were still experimental
1937–38	2D.2	1	6	5	1	0	23	4	11	1st round			went on to beat CUF in the finals of Segunda Divisão
1938–39	2D.DL	3	10	5	1	4	30	18	11	did not compete			Portuguese Cup and official leagues were created
1939–40	1D	9	18	1	5	12	26	70	7	1st round			relegated; won the Campeonato do Porto
1940–41	2D.DL1	1	8	6	1	1	29	13	13	did not compete			lost the Douro Litoral Zone final
1941–42	2D.A.2.1	1	13	12	1	0	80	12	25	quarter-final			lost the Segunda Divisão overall final; promoted
1942–43	1D	10	18	0	2	16	19	81	2	last 16			relegated
1943–44	2D.A.2.3	1	14	12	1	1	71	16	25	did not compete			lost on the round of 16 in the Segunda Divisão final phase
1944–45	2D.A.4	1	10	9	0	1	42	12	18	did not compete			lost on the Segunda Divisão final phase
1945–46	2D.A.1	1	10	7	2	1	45	9	16	did not compete			lost on the Segunda Divisão 2nd phase
1946–47	2D.A.2	1	10	9	0	1	64	8	18	not held			lost on the Segunda Divisão 2nd phase
1947–48	2D.A	2	14	9	1	4	35	23	19	1st round			lost on the Segunda Divisão 2nd phase
1948–49	2D.A	4	14	6	0	8	37	32	12	did not compete			
1949–50	2D.A.2	1	18	14	2	2	57	28	30	not held			lost on the Segunda Divisão 2nd phase
1950–51	2D.A	1	18	12	2	4	50	30	26	did not compete			lost on the Segunda Divisão 2nd phase
1951–52	2D.A	4	18	11	0	7	46	29	22	did not compete			
1952–53	2D.A	3	18	9	4	5	46	34	22	did not compete			
1953–54	2D.A	1	26	16	5	5	57	38	37	did not compete			lost on the Segunda Divisão final phase
1954–55	2DN	8	26	9	4	13	48	58	22	2nd round			
1955–56	2DN	5	26	12	6	8	78	45	30	1st round			
1956–57	2DN	5	26	14	3	9	67	50	31	2nd round			
1957–58	2DN	4	26	10	6	10	46	39	26	did not compete			
1958–59	2DN	1	26	18	5	3	55	22	41	2nd round			lost the Segunda Divisão overall final (2nd); promoted
1959–60	1D	8	26	8	7	11	48	56	23	1st round			
1960–61	1D	8	26	10	3	13	38	44	23	WINNERS			
1961–62	1D	7	26	10	3	13	47	55	23	quarter-final		CWC - QF	
1962–63	1D	5	26	10	10	6	34	33	30	3rd round			best league position ever
1963–64	1D	8	26	8	9	9	34	44	25	2nd round			
1964–65	1D	9	26	8	5	13	50	51	21	1st round		Fairs Cup - R1	
1965–66	1D	12	26	7	4	15	28	39	18	quarter-final			
1966–67	1D	7	26	8	8	10	23	29	24	quarter-final			
1967–68	1D	8	26	10	4	12	29	39	24	quarter-final			
1968–69	1D	11	26	7	7	12	21	30	21	last 16		Fairs Cup - R1	
1969–70	1D	11	26	10	1	15	33	47	21	semi-final			
1970–71	1D	13	26	7	5	14	22	44	19	last 16			
1971–72	1D	14	30	7	7	16	26	51	21	quarter-final			
1972–73	1D	9	30	11	8	11	32	45	30	quarter-final			
1973–74	1D	14	30	9	3	18	36	56	21	last 32			
1974–75	1D	9	30	10	9	11	29	42	29	last 16			
1975–76	1D	12	30	8	6	16	30	65	22	last 32			
1976–77	1D	15	30	4	15	11	15	31	23	2nd round			relegated
1977–78	2DN	4	30	13	6	11	43	37	32	3rd round			
1978–79	2DN	5	30	14	8	8	53	41	36	last 32			
1979–80	2DN	5	30	15	4	11	54	29	34	last 32			
1980–81	2DN	2	30	17	6	7	58	29	40	last 64			were 2nd on the promotion group (not promoted)
1981–82	2DN	6	30	11	9	10	36	35	31	quarter-final			
1982–83	2DN	5	30	15	7	8	45	25	37	last 16			won the Taça AF Porto
1983–84	2DN	3	29	16	5	8	47	29	37	last 32			see notes
1984–85	2DN	4	30	14	10	6	38	29	38	last 64			
1985–86	2DN	10	30	12	6	12	43	37	30	last 128			
1986–87	2DN	6	30	9	13	8	23	26	31	last 128			
1987–88	2DN	1	38	22	9	7	70	33	53	last 16			promoted
1988–89	1D	19	38	7	14	17	29	46	28	last 64			relegated
1989–90	2DN	8	34	13	9	12	46	42	35	1st round			qualified for the first Liga de Honra (2nd level)
1990–91	2H	7	38	15	13	10	49	41	43	4th round			
1991–92	2H	7	34	12	11	11	31	26	35	semi-final			
1992–93	2H	12	34	11	9	14	34	39	31	4th round			
1993–94	2H	18	34	8	8	18	24	41	24	5th round			relegated
1994–95	2DN	7	34	13	11	10	44	28	37	3rd round			
1995–96	2DN	10	34	14	6	14	47	42	48	2nd round			from this season, wins = 3 points
1996–97	2DN	2	34	20	9	5	59	26	69	3rd round			
1997–98	2DN	5	24	15	1	8	48	32	56	3rd round			
1998–99	2DN	2	34	19	9	6	62	35	66	2nd round			
1999–00	2DN	4	34	14	9	11	52	46	51	4th round			
2000–01	2DN	6	38	14	18	6	60	46	60	5th round			
2001–02	2DN	2	38	25	8	5	73	27	83	Runners-Up			
2002–03	2DN	1	38	29	7	2	73	27	94	2nd round		UEFA Cup - R1	lost the Portuguese Supercup; promoted
2003–04	2H	14	34	9	15	10	44	48	42	4th round			
2004–05	2H	6	34	14	8	12	40	33	50	4th round			
2005–06	2H	3	34	17	11	6	47	19	62	4th round			
2006–07	2H	1	30	18	6	6	45	21	60	5th round			promoted
2007–08	1D	14	30	4	14	12	27	37	26	6th round	3rd round		
2008–09	1D	6	30	12	9	9	30	31	45	quarter-final	group stage 1		
2009–10	1D	16	30	5	6	19	25	51	21	last 32	group stage 2		relegated
2010–11	2H	6	30	10	12	8	35	27	42	last 16	2nd round		
2011–12	2H	11	30	11	7	12	32	34	37	last 16	group stage 1		
2012–13	2H	3	42	18	14	10	49	36	68	last 64	2nd round		
2013–14	2H	17	42	13	8	21	42	57	47	last 16	group stage 2		
2014–15	2H	20	46	13	11	22	53	67	50	2nd round	group stage 1		
2015–16	2H	18	46	14	13	19	45	56	55	last 64	group stage		
2016–17	2H	18	42	10	16	16	44	48	46	quarter-final	1st round		won the relegation play-offs to stay in Segunda Liga
2017–18	2H	8	38	14	14	10	50	43	56	last 32	group stage		
2018–19	2H	7	34	12	9	13	35	36	45	quarter-final	2nd round		
2019–20	2H	9	24	8	9	7	23	22	33	last 32	2nd round		league suspended due to the COVID-19 pandemic
2020–21	2H	10	34	10	10	14	35	43	40	last 32	did not compete		
2021–22	2H	8	34	13	9	12	42	40	48	last 32	1st round		
2022–23	2H	15	34	10	9	15	38	49	38	last 16	group stage		started with -1 points due to failure to pay wages in the 2021–22 season
2023–24	2H	14	34	7	16	11	29	38	37	3rd round	group stage		
2024–25	2H	13	34	10	11	13	37	42	41				

- CL: Campeonato da Liga (winners weren't considered Portuguese champions)
- 1D: Primeira Liga and predecessors (1st level)
- 2H: Liga de Honra and successors (2nd level)
- 2D.DL1: Segunda Divisão, Douro Litoral Zone, Group 1 (2nd level)
- 2D.A.2.1: Segunda Divisão, Zone A, Group 2, Sub-Group 1 (2nd level)
- 2D.A: Segunda Divisão, Zone A (2nd level)
- 2DN: Segunda Divisão, Northern Zone (until 1990: 2nd level; post-1990: 3rd level)
- CWC: Cup Winners' Cup
- FC: Fairs Cup
- UC: UEFA Cup
- R1: 1st round
- QF: Quarter-final

== Other sports ==
In addition to football, Leixões also competes in boxing, karate, volleyball, swimming and billiards.

== See also ==
- Leixões SC (volleyball)
