= Corruption in Timor-Leste =

Corruption in Timor-Leste (East Timor) has been described as a critical and alarming problem because it has been institutionalized in the country. It undermines the governance of the nascent state, which only obtained its independence in 2002. Corruption affects East Timorese socio-economic development and public trust in government institutions.

== History ==
The history of corruption in Timor-Leste dates back to its colonial past. It was also culturally institutionalized during the Indonesian occupation as a range of illegal business activities emerged such as the cases of coffee and sandalwood smuggling. It is claimed that corruption was primarily an Indonesian legacy as corruption in the country was considered a principle means of greasing the wheels of government and business. The customs agency during the first constitutional administration of Timor-Leste by the Frente Revolucionario do Timor-Leste Independente was racked with allegations of corrupt practices. During the second colonial administration under the Alianca para a Maiora Parlamentar (AMP), corruption already spread into a range of ministries at the highest level.

The culture of corruption in Timor-Leste is reinforced by the traditional cultural forms of patron-client relations. It involves an expectation from the powerful and the wealthy to look after the poor and the weak so that corrupt practices as well as illegal sources of money and resources are tolerated and overlooked.

== Post-independence ==
Corruption persisted as a major issue in Timor-Leste post-independence. President Jose Ramos-Horta, himself, acknowledged that corruption in Timor-Leste is rampant, specifically citing cases in customs, procurement, public works, and rice distribution. Lack of transparency at the ministerial level of the government was also cited leading to corruption. This was demonstrated in the case of rice distribution corruption. Ramos-Horta identified less than 10 percent of civil servants are responsible for this scandal including the AMP Minister of Tourism, Commerce, and Industry, who acted in collusion with his extended family, for personal gains.

The administration of the Revolutionary Front for an Independent East Timor (FRETILIN), which covered 2002 to 2007, was also racked with numerous allegations and instances of corruption. This was highlighted in the controversial case in 2012 involving the Minister of Justice, Lucia Lobato, who served under Xanana Gusmão’s administration. She was found guilty of corruption and abuse of power after the minister was found to have manipulated public tenders and misappropriation of funds that were intended for prison construction projects.

Another notable scandal occurred in 2008. Allegations of corruption against the incumbent administration emerged after the leading FRETILIN opposition accused the minister of finance of doling out lucrative consultancies to underqualified friends. These include the government's purchase of questionable and heavily polluting power plants from China in a transaction that avoided mandatory environmental impact study. The government awarded a $300 million project to the Chinese Nuclear Industry Construction Company No. 22 (CNI22) for the construction of power and national energy facilities. The lack in transparency and poor procurement policies led to the inability of said company to meet contractual obligations and increased the costs of the project, which was further exacerbated by project delays. In addition to issues of transparency, critics also blamed political considerations rather than economic efficiency as the reasons for governmental decisions on the project.

The development of Timor-Leste's oil resources has also contributed to corruption in Timor-Leste. This is demonstrated in the case of the Petroleum Fund, which was established in 2005 to manage the country's gas revenues. It initially posted early successes in terms of the Fund's capability to support the nascent state's economic stability. In 2007, oil and gas revenues from overseas investment allowed it to shoulder 87 percent of state expenditures, paying for a wide range of services, infrastructure, and other government projects. Later, however, allegations of corruption and mismanagement emerged. By 2013, international observers had confirmed this. According to Transparency International:

While the growth in oil revenues has allowed the government to invest in much-needed infrastructure and human development initiatives, it has also created new opportunities for corruption and administrative ‘malpractice’, as reflected in the increasing number of high-level corruption cases being brought to court.

Critics also cited the Fund's involvement in the Greater Sunrise project, which attempted to develop gas reserves on Timor-Leste's southern coast. It was noted that the Fund heavily invested in the project despite high risk and uncertain returns as indicated by a study conducted by Woodside Energy. As a result of the politically motivated decisions, the project has stalled and has mired the country in sizable financial commitments without any clear path towards the completion of the project.

Public perception also confirms rampant corruption in the country. In a 2015 study, 77 percent of the population believed that corruption, nepotism, and cronyism are present at various levels of the government and are perpetuated due to personal enrichment, low wages of public officials, lack of ethics, and poor anti-corruption law enforcement. In Transparency International's 2025 Corruption Perceptions Index, which scored 182 countries on a scale from 0 ("highly corrupt") to 100 ("very clean"), Timor-Leste scored 44. When ranked by score, Timor-Leste ranked 73rd among the 182 countries in the Index, where the country ranked first is perceived to have the most honest public sector. For comparison with regional scores, the best score among those countries of the Asia Pacific region that appeared in the Index (Note: Afghanistan, Australia, Bangladesh, Bhutan, Brunei Darussalam, Cambodia, China, Fiji, Hong Kong, India, Indonesia, Japan, North Korea, South Korea, Laos, Malaysia, Maldives, Mongolia, Myanmar, Nepal, New Zealand, Pakistan, Papua New Guinea, Philippines, Singapore, Solomon Islands, Sri Lanka, Taiwan, Thailand, Timor-Leste, Vanuatu, and Vietnam) was 84, the average score was 45 and the worst score was 15. For comparison with worldwide scores, the best score was 89 (ranked 1), the average score was 42, and the worst score was 9 (ranked 181, in a two-way tie).

== Impact of corruption ==
Rampant corruption adversely impacts Timor-Leste's governance. The misappropriation and misuse of funds, and politically motivated economic decision-making, among other corrupt practices, hamper the country's development. This is highlighted in the state's inability to deliver basic and essential services such as healthcare and education.

== Anti-corruption initiatives ==
The government has instituted reforms to address corruption. This included measures such as enhanced power given to the inspector-general and the creation of the Anti-Corruption Commission. The latter, which is tasked to investigate and prevent corruption in the public sector, has made strides in promoting a culture of integrity and accountability. ACC is also supported by the United Nations Development Programme (UNDP), particularly in the area of institutional capacity, civic engagement, and analytical research.

Anti-corruption measures were also instituted by Prime Minister Rui Araujo’s administration. The set of reforms launched focused on addressing several key areas, including public administration, fiscal and economic policies, and the legislative and judicial systems.
