= João Fonseca =

João Fonseca may refer to:

- João Fonseca (footballer) (born 1948), Portuguese football manager and former goalkeeper
- João Fonseca (tennis) (born 2006), Brazilian tennis player
- João Nuno Fonseca (born 1989), Portuguese football manager
