= Carlos Fangueiro =

Portuguese footballer and manager (born 1976)

Personal information
- Full name: Carlos Manuel Fangueiro Soares
- Date of birth: 19 December 1976 (age 49)
- Place of birth: Matosinhos, Portugal
- Height: 1.74 m (5 ft 9 in)
- Position: Winger

Team information
- Current team: Leixões (manager)

Youth career
- 1987–1994: Leixões

Senior career*
Years	Team	Apps	(Gls)
1994–1997	Leixões	70	(17)
1997–2004	Vitória Guimarães	124	(24)
1998–1999	→ Maia (loan)	30	(3)
1999–2000	→ Gil Vicente (loan)	31	(6)
2004–2005	União Leiria	29	(1)
2005–2006	Millwall	9	(0)
2006–2007	Walsall	5	(1)
2007	Ionikos	4	(0)
2007–2008	Vizela	21	(3)
2008–2010	Beira-Mar	42	(11)
2010–2011	Hà Nội T&T		
2011–2012	Leixões	9	(0)
2012–2013	Atert Bissen		
Total		374	(66)

International career
1992	Portugal U15	8	(1)
1992–1993	Portugal U16	10	(1)
1994	Portugal U17	2	(0)
1994	Portugal U18	3	(2)
2000–2003	Portugal B	3	(0)

Managerial career
- 2012–2013: Atert Bissen (player-manager)
- 2013–2016: Atert Bissen
- 2016–2019: UT Pétange (sporting director)
- 2016: UT Pétange (caretaker)
- 2019–2020: UT Pétange
- 2020–2023: F91 Dudelange
- 2023: Hesperange
- 2024–2025: Leixões
- 2025: Paços de Ferreira
- 2025: Enosis Neon Paralimni
- 2025–: Leixões
- * Club domestic league appearances and goals

Carlos Manuel Fangueiro Soares (born 19 December 1976), known as Fangueiro, is a Portuguese football coach and a former right winger who is the manager of Liga Portugal 2 club Leixões.

He amassed Primeira Liga totals of 184 games and 31 goals over the course of seven seasons, representing in the competition Vitória de Guimarães, Gil Vicente and União de Leiria. He added 103/17 in the Segunda Liga, and also had spells in England with Millwall and Walsall.

== Playing career ==
=== Leixões / Vitória ===
Born in Leixões, Fangueiro joined Leixões SC's youth system at the age of 10. Still a junior, he made one appearance for the main squad in the second division, then proceeded to compete three full seasons with the club in the third level.

Fangueiro signed for Vitória S.C. in 1997, making his Primeira Liga debut on 21 September by playing 29 minutes in a 2–3 away loss against S.C. Braga. After two consecutive loan spells in division two, with F.C. Maia and Gil Vicente FC, he returned to help his team narrowly miss out on qualification for the UEFA Cup in the 2002–03 campaign after a fourth-placed finish, contributing with 28 games – 11 starts – and seven goals to this feat.

=== England ===
In the 2005 summer Fangueiro joined English side Millwall, but struggled to break into the starting line-up, making thirteen overall appearances for the Lions as they were relegated from the Championship. He scored his only goal for the club on 23 August in a 2–0 win over Bristol Rovers in the first round of the League Cup, being released at the end of the season.

Free agent Fangueiro moved to Walsall from League Two on 18 August 2006. The following day, he netted a last-minute equalizer at Lincoln City in a 2–2 draw; he signed with Ionikos F.C. on 7 December, linking up with former Vitória boss Augusto Inácio and being part of a squad that suffered relegation from the Super League Greece after amassing just four points.

=== Later years ===
Fangueiro subsequently returned to his homeland and its second tier, going on to represent F.C. Vizela and S.C. Beira-Mar. He scored a career-best 11 times in his debut season with the latter, adding 16 appearances as captain in the second to help his team return to the top division.

In May 2010, aged 33, Fangueiro signed with V.League 1's Hanoi T&T F.C. on a four-month contract. He won the national championship during his short spell, then joined boyhood club Leixões before announcing his retirement on 25 January 2012 after twelve months at the Estádio do Mar.

== Managerial career ==
On 11 May 2012, Fangueiro was appointed as manager of Luxembourg 1. Division team FC Atert Bissen on a two-year deal.

On 7 March 2016, it was confirmed that Fangueiro from the 2016-17 season, would be part of the Union Titus Pétange technical structure and would be responsible for the connection that the Luxembourg club recently had established with Vitória de Guimarães. On 1 October 2016, Fanguero was appointed interim head coach of the club, which lasted for a month, after Paolo Amodio was fired. On 5 January 2019, Fangueiro was once again appointed manager of Titus. He was fired on 11 March 2020.

On 26 May 2020, Fangueiro was appointed manager of F91 Dudelange from the 2020-21 season.

In July 2023 he was made manager of FC Swift Hesperange, but he was released again in November 2023.

On 24 January 2024, Fangueiro was appointed as head coach of his former club Leixões, now competing in Liga Portugal 2.

== Honours ==
=== Player ===
Beira-Mar

- Segunda Liga: 2009–10

Hanoi T&T

- V.League 1: 2010
