= 1940–41 Primeira Divisão =

7th season of top-tier Portuguese football

Primeira Divisão
- Season: 1940–41
- Champions: Sporting CP; 1st title
- Matches played: 56
- Goals scored: 292 (5.21 per match)

The 1940–41 Primeira Divisão season was the seventh season of top-tier football in Portugal.

== Overview ==
Location of teams in the 1940–41 Liga

It was contested by 8 teams, and Sporting Clube de Portugal won the championship.

== League standings ==
Pos	Team	Pld	W	D	L	GF	GA	GD	Pts
1	Sporting CP (C)	14	11	1	2	58	23	+35	23
2	Porto	14	8	4	2	47	27	+20	20
3	Belenenses	14	9	1	4	59	22	+37	19
4	Benfica	14	8	2	4	39	28	+11	18
5	Académica	14	4	3	7	32	41	−9	11
6	Barreirense	14	5	0	9	17	38	−21	10
7	Unidos de Lisboa	14	2	2	10	28	50	−22	6
8	Boavista	14	2	1	11	12	63	−51	5

Source: wildstat.com
(C) Champions

== Results ==
Home \ Away	ACA	BAR	BEL	BEN	BOA	POR	SCP	UNL
Académica		4–2	3–2	2–2	6–0	3–3	3–5	2–2
Barreirense	3–2		1–5	1–0	1–0	0–2	0–3	2–4
Belenenses	2–0	5–0		5–3	10–0	2–3	5–1	13–0
Benfica	3–0	4–1	2–1		6–1	3–2	2–4	3–2
Boavista	2–1	0–2	2–3	1–1		3–6	1–5	1–0
Porto	6–2	5–1	2–2	5–2	7–1		2–2	3–1
Sporting CP	7–1	2–0	3–1	1–2	9–0	5–1		4–2
Unidos de Lisboa	2–3	2–3	2–3	2–6	6–0	0–0	3–7	

Legend: Blue = home team win; Yellow = draw; Red = away team win.
