= João Martins (footballer, born 1927) =

Portuguese footballer (1927–1993)

Personal information
- Full name: João Baptista Martins
- Date of birth: 3 September 1927
- Place of birth: Sines, Portugal
- Date of death: 16 November 1993 (aged 66)
- Place of death: France
- Height: 1.74 m (5 ft 9 in)
- Position: Striker

Youth career
- Sport Lisboa e Sines
- CUF

Senior career*
Years	Team	Apps	(Gls)
1946–1959	Sporting CP	204	(131)

International career
1952–1957	Portugal	11	(0)
- * Club domestic league appearances and goals

João Baptista Martins (3 September 1927 – 16 November 1993) was a Portuguese footballer who played as a striker.

== Club career ==
Born in Sines, Setúbal District, Martins signed with Sporting CP at the age of 19 for 100 escudos, after leaving G.D. CUF as the works team did not find him an occupation as originally promised. In his 13-year tenure in Lisbon, he won seven Primeira Liga championships and the 1954 Taça de Portugal.

In the 1953–54 season, Martins scored 31 times in 23 matches for the champions. On 4 September 1955, he scored the first-ever goal in the history of the European Cup, opening a 3–3 home draw against FK Partizan at the Estádio Nacional.

Martins was deployed in every attacking position during his spell with Sporting. The scorer of 258 competitive goals, he was also used as a makeshift goalkeeper in a game against Clube Oriental de Lisboa.

== International career ==
Martins won 11 caps for Portugal over four and a half years. His first came on 23 November 1952, in a 1–1 friendly with Austria.

== Later life and death ==
Martins settled in France after retiring, and worked in a factory. He died in that country in November 1993 aged 66, due to heart failure.

== See also ==
- List of one-club men in association football
