= João Nuno Fonseca =

Portuguese football manager (born 1989)

Personal information
- Full name: João Nuno Raposo de Abreu Fonseca
- Date of birth: 1 June 1989 (age 37)
- Place of birth: Vila Nova de Famalicão, Portugal

Managerial career
- Years: Team
- 2025: Leixões

João Nuno Raposo de Abreu Fonseca (born 1 June 1989) is a Portuguese football manager.

He worked as a match analyst and assistant coach, starting at Académica de Coimbra after graduating from the University of Coimbra, and later working for teams including the Aspire Academy and Manchester City. In 2025, he was given his first head coach job at Liga Portugal 2 club Leixões, leaving in the same year.

== Career ==
=== Académica Coimbra ===
Born in Vila Nova de Famalicão, Fonseca was inspired at the age of 16 to become a football manager, based on the success of compatriot José Mourinho. He received further guidance from André Villas-Boas when he invited the latter to give a speech at the University of Coimbra.

Having graduated, Fonseca and two classmates sent applications to all clubs in Portugal's top two divisions to work as match analysts, and were hired by local Académica de Coimbra, whose director had contacted the university over such roles. He was also assistant coach of the under-19 and under-23 teams during this role; the first team won the Taça de Portugal and qualified for the UEFA Europa League, a competition he credited for developing his role as an analyst due to the large amount of information needed.

=== Analyst and assistant ===
Feeling unappreciated at Académica, where he was mistaken for a cameraman or IT worker by the board, Fonseca successfully applied to become an analyst at the Aspire Academy in Qatar in 2014. He also took on the same role with the Qatar under-19 team. In February 2017, he was hired by Manchester City.

In July 2018, Fonseca moved to French Ligue 1 club Nantes, again as an analyst. He was one of five compatriot staff members of Portuguese new manager Miguel Cardoso. Following a spell back in Portugal with Benfica B, Fonseca returned to France's top flight on 7 October 2021, joining as assistant to Óscar García after Will Still left for Standard Liège.

Fonseca was hired as assistant to Jorge Maciel – a colleague from Nantes – at Ligue 2 club Valenciennes for 2023–24. They were sacked on 6 December with the team last in the table.

In January 2025, Fonseca was hired at Ulsan HD, the three-time reigning champions of South Korea's K League, as assistant to Kim Pan-gon. His team went to the 2025 FIFA Club World Cup in the United States, where they lost all three matches.

=== Leixões ===
On 2 July 2025, Fonseca was given his first head coach job, at Leixões in Liga Portugal 2. His debut on 10 August was a 3–0 home win over Felgueiras. On 5 November 2025, he was dismissed by Leixões after the club lost 6 of their previous 7 games.
