= Álvaro Pereira (footballer, born 1904) =

Portuguese footballer

Personal information
- Full name: Álvaro Cardoso Pereira
- Date of birth: 7 November 1904
- Place of birth: Portugal
- Date of death: Deceased
- Position: Midfielder

Senior career*
Years	Team	Apps	(Gls)
1926–1935	FC Porto		

International career
1930–1934	Portugal	7	(0)
- * Club domestic league appearances and goals

Álvaro Cardoso Pereira (born 7 November 1904 - deceased), former Portuguese footballer who played as a midfielder.

== Football career ==
Pereira gained 7 caps for Portugal and made his debut 30 November 1930 in Porto against Spain, in a 0-1 defeat.
