= 1939–40 Taça de Portugal =

Tournament details
- Country: Portugal
- Teams: 15

Final positions
- Champions: Benfica
- Runners-up: Belenenses

Tournament statistics
- Matches played: 28

The 1939–40 Taça de Portugal was the second season of the Taça de Portugal (English: Portuguese Cup), the premier Portuguese football knockout competition, organized by the Portuguese Football Federation (FPF). Académica de Coimbra was the defending champion but lost in the first round to Boavista. The final was played on 7 July 1940 between S.L. Benfica and Belenenses.

== Participating teams ==
=== Primeira Divisão ===
(10 Teams)

- Associação Académica de Coimbra – Organismo Autónomo de Futebol
- Académico Futebol Clube "do Porto"
- Futebol Clube Barreirense
- Clube de Futebol Os Belenenses
- Sport Lisboa e Benfica
- Carcavelinhos Football Club
- Leixões Sport Club
- Futebol Clube do Porto
- Sporting Clube de Portugal
- Vitória Futebol Clube "de Setúbal"

=== Segunda Divisão ===
(4 Teams)

- Casa Pia Atlético Clube
- Boavista Futebol Clube
- Sporting Clube Farense
- Sporting Clube da Covilhã

=== Madeira Championship ===
(1 Team)

- Clube Sport Marítimo

== First round ==
In this round entered the teams from Primeira Divisão (1st level) and Segunda Divisão (2nd level).

=== Results ===
Team 1	Agg.	Team 2	1st leg	2nd leg
Belenenses (1D)	13–0	Sporting da Covilhã (2D)	7–0	6–0
Benfica (1D)	11–1	Casa Pia (2D)	9–0	2–1
Boavista (2D)	6–5	Académica de Coimbra (1D)	1–5	5–0
Barreirense (1D)	4–1	Académico do Porto (1D)	1–0	3–1
Carcavelinhos (1D)	6–5	Vitória de Setúbal (1D)	1–5	5–0
Porto (1D)	22–4	Leixões (2D)	12–1	10–3
Sporting CP (1D)	15–0	Farense (2D)	6–0	9–0

== Quarterfinals ==
In this round entered the winner from Madeira Championship and the winners of the previous round.

=== Results ===
Team 1	Agg.	Team 2	1st leg	2nd leg
Belenenses (1D)	5–4	Sporting CP (2D)	4–1	1–3
Benfica (1D)	8–2	Carcavelinhos (1D)	6–1	2–1
Barreirense (1D)	8–2	Marítimo (MC)	3–2	5–0
Porto (1D)	13–0	Boavista (2D)	7–0	6–0

== Semifinals ==
=== Results ===
Team 1	Agg.	Team 2	1st leg	2nd leg
Belenenses (1D)	5–5	Porto (1D)	1–1	4–4
Benfica (1D)	7–3	Barreirense (1D)	5–2	2–1

== Semifinal play-off ==
Belenenses	2–0	Porto

== Final ==
7 July 1940

Benfica	3–1	Belenenses

Estádio do Lumiar, Lisbon
