= C.F. Os Unidos =

Portuguese football club

Unidos de Lisboa
- Full name: Clube de Futebol os Unidos
- Founded: 1936 (1 May 1940 as CF Unidos)
- Ground: Estádio Dr. Agostinho Lourenço, Pontinha, Lisbon, Portugal
- Capacity: 1,000
- Chairman: Joaquim Cabeça
- Website: https://sites.google.com/site/cfosunidos/
Home colours	Away colours

Clube de Futebol Os Unidos, or more commonly Unidos de Lisboa, is a Portuguese football club established as Grupo Desportivo CUF de Lisboa (commonly known as CUF Lisboa, with CUF standing for the company Companhia União Fabril) in 1936.

== History ==
Established as Grupo Desportivo da CUF Lisboa (CUF Lisboa, with CUF standing for the company Companhia União Fabril) in 1937, it was one of three football clubs created by the parent company, whose players were also workers (the other clubs were CUF Barreiro, founded in 1937 and the most successful of the three, and the short-lived CUF Porto that existed between 1945 and 1950). In 1940, the Estado Novo forced the club to change its name, as it didn't allow sports teams with corporate names. Thus the club changed its name to Clube de Futebol Os Unidos or Unidos de Lisboa (CUF Barreiro, meanwhile changed to Unidos Futebol Clube or Unidos do Barreiro). It was during this period that the club had its most successful spell, playing three consecutive seasons, from 1940–41 to 1942–43, in the Primeira Divisão, when qualification was obtained through the district championships. They also reached the national cup semi-finals in 1941 and 1942. In 1944, the prohibition of corporate names ended, and Unidos reverted to CUF Lisboa. In 1945, they were runners-up in the Segunda Divisão, back then the second-tier national league. The club dissolved in 1947 for lack of a ground, but returned to the Lisbon FA district championships in 1954, under the Unidos de Lisboa name, seemingly choosing to ignore its CUF connections. The last senior team to play was on the 2008–09 in the Lisbon FA First Division (district second tier). Nowadays, they only run junior teams.

== League and cup history ==
Season	League									Cup	Notes
Season	Div.	Pos.	Pl	W	D	L	GS	GA	Pts	Result	Notes
1939–40	2nd	1st	10	9	0	1	42	14	18	DNQ	^{[A]}
1940–41	1st	7th	14	2	2	10	28	50	6	SF	
1941–42	1st	7th	22	7	4	11	53	49	18	SF	
1942–43	1st	4th	18	9	2	7	70	46	20	QF	^{[B]}
1943–44	2nd	1st	18	9	0	1	50	15	18	R1	^{[A]}
1944–45	2nd	1st	10	10	0	0	75	8	20	R1	^{[C]}
1945–46	2nd	2nd	10	7	1	2	57	19	15	DNQ	
1946–47	2nd	1st	8	6	1	1	42	11	13	n/a	^{[A]}
...

A. Lost in the championship playoffs.
B. Best league finish.
C. Runner-up in the championship playoffs.
