= 1941–42 Taça de Portugal =

Tournament details
- Country: Portugal
- Teams: 16

Final positions
- Champions: Clube de Futebol Os Belenenses
- Runners-up: Vitória Sport Clube

Tournament statistics
- Matches played: 17

The 1941–42 Taça de Portugal was the fourth season of the Taça de Portugal (English: Portuguese Cup), the premier Portuguese football knockout competition, organized by the Portuguese Football Federation (FPF). Sporting Clube de Portugal was the defending champion but lost in the semi-finals to Vitória Sport Clube. The final was played on 12 June 1942 between Clube de Futebol Os Belenenses and Vitória Sport Clube.

== Participating teams ==
=== Primeira Divisão ===
(12 Teams)

- Associação Académica de Coimbra – Organismo Autónomo de Futebol
- Académico Futebol Clube "do Porto"
- Futebol Clube Barreirense
- Clube de Futebol Os Belenenses
- Sport Lisboa e Benfica
- Boavista Futebol Clube
- Carcavelinhos Football Club
- Sporting Clube Olhanense
- Futebol Clube do Porto
- Sporting Clube de Portugal
- Clube de Futebol Os Unidos "de Lisboa"
- Vitória Sport Clube "de Guimarães"
- Leça Futebol Clube

=== Segunda Divisão ===
(4 Teams)

- Grupo Desportivo Estoril Praia
- Leixões Sport Clube
- Luso Sport Clube "Beja"
- Sporting Clube de Espinho

== First round ==
In this round entered the teams from Primeira Divisão (1st level) and Segunda Divisão (2nd level).

=== Results ===
Belenenses (1D)	5 – 1	Porto (1D)

Benfica (1D)	2 – 0	Barreirense (1D)

Leixões (2D)	3 – 0	Luso Beja (2D)

Olhanense (1D)	3 – 1	Académico do Porto (1D)

Sporting de Espinho (2D)	4 – 2	Carcavelinhos (1D)

Sporting CP (1D)	6 – 2	Leça (1D)

Unidos de Lisboa (1D)	3 – 3	Académica de Coimbra (1D)

Vitória de Guimarães (1D)	7 – 2	Estoril Praia (2D)

=== Replays ===
Unidos de Lisboa (1D)	4 – 2	Académica de Coimbra (1D)

== Quarterfinals ==
=== Results ===
Belenenses (1D)	1 – 1	Olhanense (1D)

Unidos de Lisboa (1D)	6 – 0	Leixões (2D)

Vitória de Guimarães (1D)	4 – 1	Sporting de Espinho (2D)

Sporting CP (1D)	4 – 0	Benfica (1D)

=== Replays ===
Belenenses (1D)	3 – 0	Olhanense (1D)

== Semifinals ==
=== Results ===
Belenenses (1D)	5 – 0	Unidos de Lisboa (1D)

Vitória de Guimarães (1D)	2 – 1	Sporting CP (2D)

== Final ==
12 June 1942

Belenenses	2 – 0	Vitória de Guimarães

Estádio do Lumiar, Lisbon
