= Adolfo Mourão =

Portuguese footballer (1912–1981)

Personal information
- Full name: Adolfo Albino Mourão
- Date of birth: 29 June 1912
- Place of birth: Algés, Portugal
- Date of death: 14 June 1981 (aged 68)
- Position: Forward

Senior career*
Years	Team	Apps	(Gls)
1928–1944	Sporting		

International career
1934–1942	Portugal	15	(2)
- * Club domestic league appearances and goals

Adolfo Albino Mourão (born 29 June 1912 in Algés - deceased 14 June 1981), former Portuguese footballer who played for Sporting and the Portugal national team, as forward.

== International career ==
Mourão made his national team debut 11 March 1934 in Madrid, in a 0-9 defeat against Spain. He gained 15 caps and scored 2 goals.
