= 1944–45 Taça de Portugal =

Tournament details
- Country: Portugal
- Teams: 16

Final positions
- Champions: Sporting Clube de Portugal
- Runners-up: Sporting Clube Olhanense

Tournament statistics
- Matches played: 31

The 1944–45 Taça de Portugal was the seventh season of the Taça de Portugal (English: Portuguese Cup), the premier Portuguese football knockout competition, organized by the Portuguese Football Federation (FPF). Benfica was the defending champion but lost in the semi-finals to Sporting Clube de Portugal. The final was played on 1 July 1945 between Sporting Clube de Portugal and Sporting Clube Olhanense.

== Participating teams ==
=== Primeira Divisão ===
(10 Teams)

- Associação Académica de Coimbra – Organismo Autónomo de Futebol
- Clube de Futebol Os Belenenses
- Sport Lisboa e Benfica
- Grupo Desportivo Estoril Praia
- Sporting Clube Olhanense
- Futebol Clube do Porto
- Sport Comércio e Salgueiros
- Sporting Clube de Portugal
- Vitória Sport Clube "de Guimarães"
- Vitória Futebol Clube "de Setúbal"

=== Segunda Divisão ===
(6 Teams)

- Atlético Clube de Portugal
- Boavista Futebol Clube
- Grupo Desportivo da CUF "Lisboa"
- Luso Sport Clube "Beja"
- Sport Lisboa e Elvas
- União Desportiva Oliveirense

== First round ==
=== Results ===
Team 1	Agg.	Team 2	1st leg	2nd leg
Atlético CP (2D)	7–4	SL Elvas (2D)	2–3	5–1
Belenenses (1D)	1–1	Estoril Praia (1D)	1–0	0–1
Benfica (1D)	11–5	Salgueiros (1D)	2–4	9–1
Boavista (1D)	5–3	Académica de Coimbra (1D)	2–2	3–1
Oliveirense (2D)	6–3	Lujo Beja (2D)	4–0	2–3
Olhanense (1D)	7–2	CUF Lisboa (2D)	3–2	4–0
Sporting CP (1D)	4–1	Porto (1D)	0–0	4–1
Vitória de Setúbal (1D)	8–2	Vitória de Guimarães (1D)	1–0	7–2

== First round play-off ==
Belenenses	2 – 1	Estoril Praia

== Quarterfinals ==
=== Results ===
Team 1	Agg.	Team 2	1st leg	2nd leg
Benfica (1D)	11–6	Belenenses (1D)	7–1	4–5
Olhanense (1D)	7–1	Atlético CP (2D)	5–0	2–1
Sporting CP (1D)	12–2	Oliveirense (2D)	8–1	4–1
Vitória de Setúbal (1D)	4–2	Boavista (1D)	3–0	1–2

== Semifinals ==
=== Results ===
Team 1	Agg.	Team 2	1st leg	2nd leg
Olhanense (1D)	3–2	Vitória de Setúbal (1D)	0–2	3–0
Sporting CP (1D)	4–4	Benfica (1D)	1–2	3–2

== Semifinal play-off ==
Sporting CP	1 – 0	Benfica

== Final ==
1 July 1945

Sporting CP	1 – 0	Olhanense

Campo das Salésias, Lisbon
