= 1940–41 Taça de Portugal =

Tournament details
- Country: Portugal
- Teams: 15

Final positions
- Champions: Sporting Clube de Portugal
- Runners-up: Clube de Futebol Os Belenenses

Tournament statistics
- Matches played: 28

The 1940–41 Taça de Portugal was the third season of the Taça de Portugal (English: Portuguese Cup), the premier Portuguese football knockout competition, organized by the Portuguese Football Federation (FPF). Benfica was the defending champion but lost in the semi-finals to Belenenses. The final was played on 22 June 1941 between Sporting Clube de Portugal and Clube de Futebol Os Belenenses.

== Participating teams ==
=== Primeira Divisão ===
(8 Teams)

- Associação Académica de Coimbra – Organismo Autónomo de Futebol
- Futebol Clube Barreirense
- Clube de Futebol Os Belenenses
- Sport Lisboa e Benfica
- Boavista Futebol Clube
- Futebol Clube do Porto
- Sporting Clube de Portugal
- Clube de Futebol Os Unidos "de Lisboa"

=== Segunda Divisão ===
(6 Teams)

- Leça Futebol Clube
- Sporting Clube Olhanense
- Operário Futebol Clube de Lisboa
- Seixal Futebol Clube
- Sporting Clube da Covilhã
- Vitória Sport Clube "de Guimarães"

=== Madeira Championship ===
(1 Team)

- Clube de Futebol União "da Madeira"

== First round ==
In this round entered the teams from Primeira Divisão (1st level) and Segunda Divisão (2nd level).

=== Results ===
Team 1	Agg.	Team 2	1st leg	2nd leg
Académica de Coimbra (1D)	11–4	Leça (2D)	2–2	9–2
Belenenses (1D)	15–1	Boavista (1D)	7–1	8–0
Benfica (1D)	13–0	Sporting da Covilhã (2D)	5–0	8–0
Porto (1D)	8–3	Olhanense (2D)	3–1	5–2
Sporting CP (1D)	7–2	Seixal (2D)	3–1	4–1
Unidos de Lisboa (1D)	14–3	Operário de Lisboa (2D)	7–1	7–2
Vitória de Guimarães (2D)	6–1	Barreirense (1D)	0–0	6–1

== Quarterfinals ==
In this round entered the winner from Madeira Championship and the winners of the previous round.

=== Results ===
Team 1	Agg.	Team 2	1st leg	2nd leg
Belenenses (1D)	7–1	Académica de Coimbra (2D)	5–1	2–0
Porto (1D)	4–5	Benfica (1D)	4–3	0–2
Sporting CP (1D)	16–2	Vitória de Guimarães (2D)	12–0	4–2
Unidos de Lisboa (1D)	5–0	União da Madeira (MC)	3–0	2–0

== Semifinals ==
=== Results ===
Team 1	Agg.	Team 2	1st leg	2nd leg
Belenenses (1D)	2–2	Benfica (1D)	0–1	2–1
Sporting CP (1D)	11–2	Unidos de Lisboa (1D)	8–1	3–1

== Semifinal play-off ==
Belenenses	3 – 2	Benfica

== Final ==
22 June 1941

Sporting CP	4 – 1	Belenenses

Campo das Salésias, Lisbon
