= Rui Araújo =

Portuguese footballer

Personal information
- Date of birth: 25 March 1910
- Place of birth: Portugal
- Date of death: 8 January 1998 (aged 87)
- Position: Midfielder

Senior career*
Years	Team	Apps	(Gls)
1929–1932	União Lisboa	3	(0)
1932–1939	Sporting CP	105	(3)

International career
1931–1936	Portugal	4	(0)
- * Club domestic league appearances and goals

Rui Araújo (25 March 1910 – 8 January 1998) was a Portuguese footballer who played as midfielder.
