= 1980–81 S.L. Benfica season =

Benfica
1980–81 season
- President: José Ferreira Queimado (until 29 May 1981); Fernando Martins
- Head coach: Lajos Baróti
- Stadium: Estádio da Luz
- Primeira Divisão: 1st
- Taça de Portugal: Winners
- Cup Winners' Cup: Semi-finals
- Supertaça de Portugal: Winners
- Top goalscorer: League: Nené (20); All: Nené (32)
Home colours

The 1980–81 season was Sport Lisboa e Benfica's 77th season in existence and the club's 47th consecutive season in the top flight of Portuguese football, covering the period from 1 July 1980 to 30 June 1981. Benfica competed domestically in the Primeira Divisão, Taça de Portugal and the Supertaça de Portugal, and participated in the Cup Winners' Cup after winning the Taça de Portugal in the previous season.

In the new season, Mário Wilson was replaced by Lajos Baróti. In the transfer season, major signings included António Veloso, Francisco Vital and João Alves, who returned to the club. Benfica's league campaign started with seven consecutive wins, before a first loss with Porto in the Clássico. A few days later, Benfica wins their first Supertaça de Portugal. In the Cup Winners' Cup, Benfica eliminated Altay, Dinamo Zagreb and Malmö in the first three rounds. In late November, Benfica draws with Sporting and three weeks later, with Vitória de Setúbal, lapping the first half in first place with a three-point lead. In the following weeks, Benfica won three more matches before losing another point in a draw with Penafiel, which cut his lead to two points. They reacted with four more wins, including a home win against Porto, which widened their difference to four points. Meanwhile, in Europe, Benfica defeated Fortuna Düsseldorf in quarter-finals but was knocked-out by Carl Zeiss Jena in the semis. The final two months of the Primeira Divisão saw Benfica drop points with Académico de Viseu, Vitória de Guimarães and Sporting, reducing their lead to two points. On match-day 29, a home win against Setúbal secured their 24th league title. They concluded the season by winning their 17th Taça de Portugal in a 3–1 win against Porto.

== Season summary ==
In the previous season, Mário Wilson failed to regain the title, prolonging the drought to three years. It was the first time since 1954 that Benfica went so long without a league title. Despite winning the Taça de Portugal, he did not continue for a second year. As replacement, Benfica contacted Raymond Goethals, but he declined, so the club turned to 66-year old Hungarian Lajos Baróti. After negotiations, on 9 June, he agreed to replace Wilson. In the transfer season, Benfica signed players like António Veloso and Francisco Vital, who were regularly used by Baroti. However the transfer of Summer was the return of João Alves from France, with Benfica making a last minute offer and signing him, before Sporting, who was also interested, could. The pre-season began on 21 July, with Benfica travelling to Canada on the 28 to play the Toronto Tournament. After winning the tournament in Canada, Benfica made their presentation game on 13 August with Paris Saint-Germain, and finished the pre-season by competing in the Trofeo Santiago Bernabéu with Real Madrid and Dinamo Kyiv from 29 to 31 August. The match with Varzim scheduled for that weekend was postponed to 4 October.

Benfica started their season with the preliminary round of the Cup Winners' Cup with Altay, beating 4–0 at home. Domestic competition began on 24 August in an away win against Boavista. Benfica kept on winning in the following weeks, eliminating Dinamo Zagreb in Europe, and winning six more league matches in a row, with Manuel Bento going unbeaten in the league for 1080 minutes. In late October, Benfica visited Porto at Estádio das Antas, losing by 2–1, their first in the league. They recovered from the loss and won their next three matches for the Primeira Divisão, creating a four-point lead at the front. They also beat Sporting in the second leg of the Supertaça de Portugal and won their first Supertaça. In the Cup Winners' Cup, they progressed to the quarter-finals after knocking out Malmö. On match-day 12, Benfica faced Sporting in Alvalade and drew 1–1, retaining the first place. Three weeks later, they drew again, now with Vitória de Setúbal and finished the first half of the league a week later with a three-point lead.

Benfica started the second half with three consecutive wins, until they were stopped by Penafiel in early February, which shortened their lead over Porto to only two points. They reacted with four more wins in a row, including a home win against Porto on 14 March in the Clássico, which gave them a four-point lead with seven matches to go. At the same time, in the Cup Winners' Cup, Benfica beat Fortuna Düsseldorf at home, after a 2–2 away draw, qualifying for the semi-final. March closed with another draw, now with Académico de Viseu, removing a point from their lead over Porto. On 8 April, Benfica met Carl Zeiss Jena for the first leg of the semi-finals, losing 2–0. Four days later, they drew with Vitória de Guimarães, and saw his lead drop to two points with four match-days to go, one of them against Sporting. The European campaign ended on 22 April, with a one-nil win, not enough to overcome the deficit brought from Jena.

Benfica started May with the Lisbon derby against Sporting. They drew 1–1 in a match riddled with controversy. Sporting complained of several mistakes by referee Inácio de Almeida and asked for him to be banned for refereeing. Because Porto had also drop points in Penafiel, Benfica kept their two-point lead. A few days later, Benfica faced Jimmy Hagan's Belenenses for the semi-finals of the Portuguese Cup, winning 1–0 and qualifying for the final. They made their second visit to Estádio do Restelo, seven days later, now for the Primeira Divisão. They won by 3–0, with a double from Nené, who secured his first Bola de Prata for league top-scorer. A week later, Benfica thrashed Vitória de Setúbal by 5–1 and confirmed their 24th league title, the first since 1976–77. The celebrations were scared by the violent confrontations between Police and Benfica fans. The league campaign ended with a 2–0 loss against Espinho, which the Portuguese Football Federation turned to a 3–0 loss because Benfica fans had celebrated too soon and invaded the pitch. The season concluded with the Taça de Portugal final against Porto, where Nené scored a hat-trick in a 3–1 win, with Benfica securing a double. Before leaving, departing President José Ferreira Queimado signed a one-year extension with Baróti.

== Competitions ==
Win Draw Loss Postponed

=== Overall record ===
| Competition | First match | Last match | Record | | | | | | | | |
| Competition | First match | Last match | G | W | D | L | GF | GA | GD | Win % | Source |
|---|---|---|---|---|---|---|---|---|---|---|---|
| Primeira Divisão | 24 August 1980 | 31 May 1981 | 30 | 22 | 6 | 2 | 72 | 15 | +57 | 73.33 | |
| Taça de Portugal | 4 January 1981 | 6 June 1981 | 7 | 7 | 0 | 0 | 17 | 3 | +14 | 100.00 | |
| Cup Winners' Cup | 20 August 1980 | 22 April 1981 | 10 | 5 | 3 | 2 | 12 | 5 | +7 | 50.00 | |
| Supertaça de Portugal | 10 September 1980 | 29 October 1980 | 2 | 1 | 1 | 0 | 4 | 3 | +1 | 50.00 | |
| Total | | | 49 | 35 | 10 | 4 | 105 | 26 | +79 | 71.43 | |

=== Supertaça de Portugal ===
| 10 September 1980 First leg | Sporting | 2–2 | Benfica | Lisbon |
| 20:00 | Jordão 59' (pen.), 67' | | Carlos Manuel 10'; César 42' | Stadium: Estádio José Alvalade; Referee: Vítor Correia |

| 29 October 1980 Second leg | Benfica | 2–1 | Sporting | Lisbon |
| 20:00 | Nené 43'; Vital 87' | | Jordão 25' (pen.) | Stadium: Estádio da Luz; Referee: Nemésio de Castro |

=== Primeira Divisão ===
==== League table ====
| Pos | Team | Pld | W | D | L | GF | GA | GD | Pts | Qualification or relegation |
|---|---|---|---|---|---|---|---|---|---|---|
| 1 | Benfica (C) | 30 | 22 | 6 | 2 | 72 | 15 | +57 | 50 | Qualification to European Cup first round |
| 2 | Porto | 30 | 21 | 6 | 3 | 53 | 18 | +35 | 48 | Qualification to Cup Winners' Cup first round (Note: Porto qualified for the Cup Winners' Cup as the other finalist, Benfica, had qualified for the European Cup.) |
| 3 | Sporting CP | 30 | 14 | 9 | 7 | 48 | 28 | +20 | 37 | Qualification to UEFA Cup first round |
| 4 | Boavista | 30 | 14 | 8 | 8 | 36 | 25 | +11 | 36 | Qualification to UEFA Cup first round |
| 5 | Vitória de Guimarães | 30 | 11 | 9 | 10 | 38 | 30 | +8 | 31 | |

Source: RSSSF and footballzz.co.uk
(C) Champions

==== Results by round ====
| Round | 1 | 2 | 3 | 4 | 5 | 6 | 7 | 8 | 9 | 10 | 11 | 12 | 13 | 14 | 15 | 16 | 17 | 18 | 19 | 20 | 21 | 22 | 23 | 24 | 25 | 26 | 27 | 28 | 29 | 30 |
|---|---|---|---|---|---|---|---|---|---|---|---|---|---|---|---|---|---|---|---|---|---|---|---|---|---|---|---|---|---|---|
| Ground | A | H | A | H | H | A | H | A | H | A | H | A | H | A | H | H | A | H | A | A | H | A | H | A | H | A | H | A | H | A |
| Result | W | W | W | W | W | W | W | L | W | W | W | D | W | D | W | W | W | W | D | W | W | W | W | D | W | D | D | W | W | L |
| Position | 4 | 2 | 1 | 1 | 1 | 1 | 1 | 1 | 1 | 1 | 1 | 1 | 1 | 1 | 1 | 1 | 1 | 1 | 1 | 1 | 1 | 1 | 1 | 1 | 1 | 1 | 1 | 1 | 1 | 1 |

Source: ForaDeJogo
A = Away; H = Home; W = Win; D = Draw; L = Loss

==== Matches ====
| 24 August 1980 1 | Boavista | 0–1 | Benfica | Porto |
| 20:00 | | Report | César 32' | Stadium: Estádio do Bessa; Referee: António Garrido |

| 31 August 1980 (Note: Postponed due to Benfica's participation in the Trofeo Santiago Bernabéu) 2 | Benfica | Postponed | Varzim | Lisbon |
| | | Report | | Stadium: Estádio da Luz |

| 7 September 1980 3 | Braga | 0–3 | Benfica | Braga |
| 19:00 | | Report | João Cardoso 44' (o.g.); Nené 56'; João Alves 89' | Stadium: Estádio 1º de Maio; Referee: Armando Paraty |

| 15 September 1980 4 | Benfica | 6–0 | Penafiel | Lisbon |
| 19:00 | João Alves 51', 54'; Carlos Manuel 63'; Nené 65', 80'; César 85' | Report | | Stadium: Estádio da Luz; Referee: Raúl Nazaré |

| 21 September 1980 5 | Benfica | 2–0 | Portimonense | Lisbon |
| 20:00 | Laranjeira 14'; João Alves 25' | Report | | Stadium: Estádio da Luz; Referee: Marques Pires |

| 28 September 1980 6 | Amora | 0–2 | Benfica | Amora |
| 18:00 | | Report | Carlos Manuel 53'; Jorge Gomes 89' | Stadium: Estádio da Medideira; Referee: Albino Rodrigues |

| 4 October 1980 2 | Benfica | 1–0 | Varzim | Lisbon |
| 20:00 | João Alves 73' | Report | | Stadium: Estádio da Luz; Referee: José Luís Tavares |

| 19 October 1980 7 | Benfica | 4–0 | Académica | Lisbon |
| 19:45 | César 48', 72'; João Alves 59' (pen.); Francisco Vital 68' | Report | | Stadium: Estádio da Luz; Referee: Amândio Silva |

| 25 October 1980 8 | Porto | 2–1 | Benfica | Porto |
| 20:30 | Walsh 5'; José Costa 55' | Report | Nené 11' | Stadium: Estádio das Antas; Referee: Mário Luís |

| 2 November 1980 9 | Benfica | 3–0 | Académico de Viseu | Lisbon |
| 20:00 | João Alves 68'; Nené 80', 83' | Report | Hélder (red card) 77' | Stadium: Estádio da Luz; Referee: Américo Lopes |

| 9 November 1980 10 | Marítimo | 1–2 | Benfica | Lisbon |
| 20:00 | Mário Ventura 24' | Report | Carlos Manuel 26'; Nené 70' | Stadium: Estádio de Alvalade; Referee: António Garrido |

| 23 November 1980 11 | Benfica | 2–0 | Vitória de Guimarães | Lisbon |
| 20:00 | João Alves 16', 76' | Report | | Stadium: Estádio da Luz; Referee: Alder Dante |

| 29 November 1980 12 | Sporting | 1–1 | Benfica | Lisbon |
| 20:00 | Freire 69' | Report | César 25' | Stadium: Estádio de Alvalade; Referee: Marques Pires |

| 9 December 1980 13 | Benfica | 4–1 | Belenenses | Lisbon |
| 18:00 | Shéu 44'; Nené 68' (pen.), 80' (pen.); Reinaldo 78' | Report | Moisés 71' (pen.) | Stadium: Estádio da Luz; Referee: Raúl Nazaré |

| 21 December 1980 14 | Vitória de Setúbal | 0–0 | Benfica | Setúbal |
| 19:00 | | Report | | Stadium: Estádio do Bonfim; Referee: Veiga Trigo |

| 28 December 1980 15 | Benfica | 2–0 | Espinho | Lisbon |
| 19:00 | Reinaldo 47'; Humberto Coelho 70' | Report | | Stadium: Estádio da Luz; Referee: Ezequiel Feijão |

| 11 January 1981 16 | Benfica | 3–0 | Boavista | Lisbon |
| 20:00 | Humberto Coelho 13', 20'; João Alves 83' | Report | | Stadium: Estádio da Luz; Referee: Inácio de Almeida |

| 18 January 1981 17 | Varzim | 0–4 | Benfica | Póvoa de Varzim |
| 19:00 | | Report | César 17'; Reinaldo 31'; Carlos Manuel 37', 87' | Stadium: Estádio do Varzim SC; Referee: António Garrido |

| 25 January 1981 18 | Benfica | 3–1 | Braga | Lisbon |
| 20:00 | Humberto Coelho 5'; Reinaldo 46'; Nené 60' | Report | Jacques 11' | Stadium: Estádio da Luz; Referee: Veiga Trigo |

| 7 February 1981 19 | Penafiel | 0–0 | Benfica | Penafiel |
| 19:00 | | Report | | Stadium: Estádio Municipal 25 de Abril; Referee: Mário Luís |

| 15 February 1981 20 | Portimonense | 1–5 | Benfica | Portimão |
| 18:00 | Amaral 49' | Report | Nené 23', 28'; Reinaldo 34'; Caíca 62' (o.g.); Carlos Manuel 77' | Stadium: Estádio Municipal de Portimão; Referee: Raúl Nazaré |

| 21 February 1981 21 | Benfica | 4–1 | Amora | Lisbon |
| 20:00 | Shéu 19'; Reinaldo 25', 69'; Chalana 50' | Report | Narciso 35' | Stadium: Estádio da Luz; Referee: Rául Ribeiro |

| 8 March 1981 22 | Académica | 0–2 | Benfica | Coimbra |
| 19:00 | | Report | Nené 37', 49' | Stadium: Estádio Municipal de Coimbra; Referee: Azevedo Duarte |

| 14 March 1981 23 | Benfica | 1–0 | Porto | Lisbon |
| 20:00 | João Alves 44' | Report | | Stadium: Estádio da Luz; Referee: António Garrido |

| 22 March 1981 24 | Académico de Viseu | 1–1 | Benfica | Viseu |
| 20:00 | Inaldo 7' | Report | César 71' | Stadium: Estádio do Fontelo; Referee: Inácio de Almeida |

| 4 April 1981 25 | Benfica | 6–1 | Marítimo | Lisbon |
| 19:00 | Reinaldo 8'; Nené 50', 86' (pen.); César 66'; Carlos Manuel 89'; João Alves 90' | Report | Toninho Metralha 64' | Stadium: Estádio da Luz; Referee: Marques Pires |

| 12 April 1981 26 | Vitória de Guimarães | 0–0 | Benfica | Guimarães |
| 19:00 | | Report | | Stadium: Estádio D. Afonso Henriques; Referee: José Luís Tavares |

| 2 May 1981 27 | Benfica | 1–1 | Sporting | Lisbon |
| 20:00 | Nené 43' (pen.) | Report | Jordão 65' | Stadium: Estádio da Luz; Referee: Inácio de Almeida |

| 17 May 1981 28 | Belenenses | 0–3 | Benfica | Lisbon |
| 19:00 | | Report | Nené 31', 85'; João Alves 41' | Stadium: Estádio do Restelo; Referee: Alder Dante |

| 24 May 1981 29 | Benfica | 5–1 | Vitória de Setúbal | Lisbon |
| 18:00 | César 18', 41', 88'; Nené 44'; João Alves 50' | Report | Dário 78' | Stadium: Estádio da Luz; Referee: Rául Ribeiro |

| 31 May 1981 30 | Espinho | 2–0 | Benfica | Espinho |
| 18:30 | Vitorinho 2'; Carlos Coelho 59' | Report | | Stadium: Estádio Comendador Manuel Violas; Referee: Santos Luís |

=== Taça de Portugal ===
| 4 January 1981 Third Rd | Benfica e Castelo Branco | 0–3 | Benfica | Castelo Branco |
| 16:00 | | Report | Nené 15'; Carlos Manuel 30'; Reinaldo 70' | Stadium: Estádio Municipal Vale do Romeiro; Referee: Mário Luís |

| 1 February 1981 Fourth Rd | União de Coimbra | 0–2 | Benfica | Coimbra |
| 16:00 | | Report | Reinaldo 48'; Nené 80' | Stadium: Estádio Municipal; Referee: António Rodrigues |

| 1 March 1981 Fifth Rd | Vasco da Gama | 1–2 | Benfica | Sines |
| 17:00 | Beto 56' | Report | Reinaldo 35'; Carlos Manuel 54' | Stadium: Estádio Municipal de Sines; Referee: Alder Dante |

| 29 March 1981 Round of 16 | Sacavanense | 0–4 | Benfica | Sacavém |
| 17:00 | | Report | Nené 77', 82'; Vital 80', 86' | Stadium: Campo do Sacavanense; Referee: Manuel Poeira |

| 19 April 1981 Quarter-final | Esperança de Lagos | 1–2 | Benfica | Lagos |
| 16:00 | Nascimento 35' | Report | Humberto Coelho 5'; Reinaldo 68' | Stadium: Parque Rossio da Trindade; Referee: Américo Lopes |

| 10 May 1981 Semi-final | Belenenses | 0–1 | Benfica | Lisbon |
| 18:00 | | Report | 52' Reinaldo | Stadium: Estádio do Restelo; Referee: Marques Pires |

| 6 June 1981 Final | Benfica | 3–1 | Porto | Oeiras |
| 17:00 | Nené 31', 55', 85' | Report | Veloso 9' (o.g.) | Stadium: Estádio Nacional; Referee: Alder Dante |

=== European Cup Winners' Cup ===
==== Preliminary round ====
| 20 August 1980 First leg | Altay (Turkey) | 0–0 | (Portugal) Benfica | İzmir |
| 20:00 | | Report | | Stadium: İzmir Atatürk Stadium; Attendance: 22,000; Referee: Iordan Zhezhov |

| 3 September 1980 Second leg | Benfica (Portugal) | 4–0 (4–0 agg.) | (Turkey) Altay | Lisbon |
| 19:00 | Chalana 22'; Humberto Coelho 44'; Nené 63'; César 70' | Report | | Stadium: Estádio da Luz; Attendance: 60,000; Referee: Robert Wurtz |

==== First round ====
| 17 September 1980 First leg | Dinamo Zagreb (Socialist Federal Republic of Yugoslavia) | 0–0 | (Portugal) Benfica | Zagreb |
| 20:00 | | Report | | Stadium: Stadion Maksimir; Attendance: 52,500; Referee: Horst Brummeier |

| 1 October 1980 Second leg | Benfica (Portugal) | 2–0 (2–0 agg.) | (Socialist Federal Republic of Yugoslavia) Dinamo Zagreb | Lisbon |
| 19:00 | Nené 17'; César 56' | Report | | Stadium: Estádio da Luz; Attendance: 50,000; Referee: Gianfranco Menegali |

==== Second round ====
| 22 October 1980 First leg | Malmö (Sweden) | 1–0 | (Portugal) Benfica | Malmö |
| 20:00 | Andersson 49' | Report | | Stadium: Malmö Stadion; Attendance: 10,585; Referee: Siegfried Kirschen |

| 5 November 1980 Second leg | Benfica (Portugal) | 2–0 (2–1 agg.) | (Sweden) Malmö | Lisbon |
| 20:00 | Nené 57' (pen.), 60' (pen.) | Report | | Stadium: Estádio da Luz; Attendance: 70,000; Referee: Ian Foote |

==== Quarter-finals ====
| 4 March 1981 First leg | Fortuna Düsseldorf (West Germany) | 2–2 | (Portugal) Benfica | Düsseldorf |
| 20:00 | Wenzel 2'; Dusend 39' | Report | Carlos Manuel 35'; Humberto Coelho 77' | Stadium: Rheinstadion; Attendance: 32,000; Referee: Edvard Sostaric |

| 18 March 1981 Second leg | Benfica (Portugal) | 1–0 (3–2 agg.) | (West Germany) Fortuna Düsseldorf | Lisbon |
| 20:00 | Chalana 87' | Report | | Stadium: Estádio da Luz; Attendance: 80,000; Referee: Jan Keizer |

==== Semi-finals ====
| 8 April 1981 First leg | Carl Zeiss Jena (East Germany) | 2–0 | (Portugal) Benfica | Jena |
| 20:00 | Bielau 8'; Raab 15' | Report | | Stadium: Ernst Abbe Sportfield; Attendance: 18,000; Referee: Enzo Barbaresco |

| 22 April 1981 Second leg | Benfica (Portugal) | 1–0 (1–2 agg.) | (East Germany) Carl Zeiss Jena | Lisbon |
| 20:00 | Reinaldo 59' | Report | | Stadium: Estádio da Luz; Attendance: 70,000; Referee: Pat Partridge |

=== Friendlies ===
| 2 August 1980 Toronto TM | Pan Hellenic | 0–4 | Benfica | Toronto |
| | | | Pietra; Reinaldo; Nené (pen.); Veloso | Attendance: 6,000 |

| 4 August 1980 Toronto TM | Benfica | 6–1 | Partizan Belgrade | Toronto |
| | Carlos Manuel |

| 13 August 1980 | Benfica | 4–1 | Paris Saint-Germain | Lisbon |
| | César 15', 88'; Carlos Manuel 82' | | | Stadium: Estádio da Luz; Attendance: 50,000; Referee: Graça Oliva |

| 29 August 1980 Santiago Bernabéu | Real Madrid | 2–2 (4–1 p) | Benfica | Madrid |
| 20:45 | Cunningham 31', 36' | | Humberto Coelho 82', 86' | Stadium: Santiago Bernabéu Stadium; Referee: Heinz Aldinger |
| | Penalties |
| | Santilana (penalty scored); Cunningham (penalty scored); García Hernandez (penalty scored); Juanito (penalty scored) | | (penalty scored) Humberto Coelho; (penalty missed) Nené; (penalty missed) Chalana |

| 31 August 1980 Santiago Bernabéu | Dinamo Kyiv | 2–1 | Benfica | Madrid |
| | Veremeyev 31'; Yevtushenko 73' | | Reinaldo 11' | Stadium: Santiago Bernabéu Stadium; Referee: García Carrión |

| 3 June 1981 Artur Correia Testm | Sporting | 1–2 | Benfica | Lisbon |
| 20:00 | Manuel Fernandes 47' | | Vital 30'; Reinaldo 82' | Stadium: Estádio José Alvalade; Referee: António Garrido |

| 26 June 1981 | Benfica | 2–1 | China | Lisbon |
| | Filipovic 18'; Nené 40' | | Chen Xirong 17' | Stadium: Estádio da Luz; Referee: Graça Oliva |

== Player statistics ==
The squad for the season consisted of the players listed in the tables below, as well as staff member Lajos Baróti (manager), Monge da Silva (assistant manager), Fernando Caiado (assistant manager), Gaspar Ramos (Director of Football).

Note 1: Note: Flags indicate national team as defined under FIFA eligibility rules. Players may hold more than one non-FIFA nationality.

Note 2: Players with squad numbers marked ‡ joined the club during the 1980-81 season via transfer, with more details in the following section.

| No. | Pos | Nat | Player | Total | | Primeira Divisão | | Taça de Portugal | | Cup Winners' Cup | | Supertaça | |
| No. | Pos | Nat | Player | Apps | Goals | Apps | Goals | Apps | Goals | Apps | Goals | Apps | Goals |
|---|---|---|---|---|---|---|---|---|---|---|---|---|---|
| 1 | GK | (Portugal) POR | Manuel Bento | 46 | 0 | 30 | 0 | 5 | 0 | 10 | 0 | 1 | 0 |
| 1 | GK | (Portugal) POR | António Botelho | 4 | 0 | 0 | 0 | 2 | 0 | 0 | 0 | 2 | 0 |
| 2 | DF | (Portugal) POR | Minervino Pietra | 43 | 0 | 30 | 0 | 5 | 0 | 7 | 0 | 1 | 0 |
| 2^{‡} | DF | (Portugal) POR | António Veloso | 36 | 0 | 23 | 0 | 5 | 0 | 7 | 0 | 1 | 0 |
| 3 | DF | (Portugal) POR | Humberto Coelho | 36 | 7 | 22 | 4 | 4 | 1 | 9 | 2 | 1 | 0 |
| 4 | DF | (Portugal) POR | João Laranjeira | 34 | 1 | 20 | 1 | 5 | 0 | 8 | 0 | 1 | 0 |
| 4 | DF | (Portugal) POR | Frederico Rosa | 28 | 0 | 17 | 0 | 4 | 0 | 5 | 0 | 2 | 0 |
| 4 | DF | (Portugal) POR | Carlos Alhinho | 6 | 0 | 4 | 0 | 1 | 0 | 0 | 0 | 1 | 0 |
| 4^{‡} | DF | (Portugal) POR | Alberto Bastos Lopes | 8 | 0 | 4 | 0 | 1 | 0 | 2 | 0 | 1 | 0 |
| 5 | DF | (Portugal) POR | António Bastos Lopes | 37 | 0 | 22 | 0 | 6 | 0 | 8 | 0 | 1 | 0 |
| 6 | MF | (Portugal) POR | José Luís | 16 | 0 | 8 | 0 | 3 | 0 | 3 | 0 | 2 | 0 |
| 6 | MF | (Portugal) POR | Carlos Manuel | 47 | 11 | 28 | 7 | 7 | 2 | 10 | 1 | 2 | 1 |
| 6^{‡} | MF | (Portugal) POR | João Alves | 46 | 14 | 30 | 14 | 5 | 0 | 9 | 0 | 2 | 0 |
| 6 | MF | (Portugal) POR | Toni | 1 | 0 | 1 | 0 | 0 | 0 | 0 | 0 | 0 | 0 |
| 7 | FW | (Portugal) POR | Nené | 48 | 32 | 29 | 20 | 7 | 7 | 10 | 4 | 2 | 1 |
| 8 | FW | (Portugal) POR | Reinaldo Gomes | 25 | 14 | 15 | 8 | 6 | 5 | 4 | 1 | 0 | 0 |
| 9 | FW | (Brazil) BRA | Jorge Gomes | 14 | 1 | 7 | 1 | 3 | 0 | 4 | 0 | 0 | 0 |
| 9 | FW | (Brazil) BRA | César Oliveira | 33 | 14 | 18 | 11 | 6 | 0 | 7 | 2 | 2 | 1 |
| 9^{‡} | FW | (Portugal) POR | Francisco Vital | 28 | 4 | 15 | 1 | 4 | 2 | 7 | 0 | 2 | 1 |
| 10 | MF | (Portugal) POR | Fernando Chalana | 39 | 3 | 24 | 1 | 6 | 0 | 8 | 2 | 1 | 0 |
| 11 | MF | (Portugal) POR | Shéu | 47 | 2 | 30 | 2 | 6 | 0 | 10 | 0 | 1 | 0 |
| 11^{‡} | FW | (Portugal) POR | Joel Almeida | 1 | 0 | 0 | 0 | 0 | 0 | 0 | 0 | 1 | 0 |

== Transfers ==
=== In ===
| Entry date | Position | Player | From club | Fee | Ref |
|---|---|---|---|---|---|
| 13 May 1980 | FW | Joel Almeida | Amora | Undisclosed | |
| 25 June 1980 | DF | António Veloso | Beira-Mar | Undisclosed | |
| 25 June 1980 | FW | Francisco Vital | Betis | Undisclosed | |
| 27 June 1980 | MF | João Alves | Paris Saint-Germain | Undisclosed | |
| 28 July 1980 | DF | Alberto Bastos Lopes | Estoril-Praia | Loan return | |
| 28 July 1980 | GK | Jorge Martins | Barreirense | Undisclosed | |

=== Out ===
| Exit date | Position | Player | To club | Fee | Ref |
|---|---|---|---|---|---|
| 15 July 1981 | MF | Orlando Fonseca | Vitória de Guimarães | Free | |
| 23 July 1980 | MF | Mário Wilson | Académica de Coimbra | Free | |
| July 1980 | MF | Adriano Spencer | Alcobaça | | |

=== Out by loan ===
| Exit date | Position | Player | To club | Return date | Ref |
|---|---|---|---|---|---|
| 2 June 1980 | FW | Jorge Silva | Amora | 30 June 1981 | |
| 2 June 1980 | DF | Joaquim Pereirinha | Amora | 30 June 1981 | |
| 8 August 1980 | MF | Diamantino Miranda | Amora | 30 June 1981 | |
| 19 August 1980 | MF | Cavungi | Braga | 30 June 1981 | |
