= 1979–80 S.L. Benfica season =

Benfica
1979–80 season
- President: José Ferreira Queimado
- Head coach: Mário Wilson
- Stadium: Estádio da Luz
- Primeira Divisão: 3rd
- Taça de Portugal: Winners
- UEFA Cup: First round
- Top goalscorer: League: Nené (30); All: Nené (36)
Home colours

The 1979–80 season was Sport Lisboa e Benfica's 76th season in existence and the club's 46th consecutive season in the top flight of Portuguese football, covering the period from 1 July 1979 to 30 June 1980. Benfica competed domestically in the Primeira Divisão and the Taça de Portugal, and participated in the UEFA Cup after finishing second in the previous league.

Benfica began the new season hoping to prevent a third consecutive season without honours. After discarding the rule that prevented foreigners from representing Benfica, they signed their first one, Jorge Gomes. He was aided by other addictions like Carlos Manuel, João Laranjeira and second foreigner, César. Departing players included João Alves, Eurico Gomes and José Henrique. The league campaign started well and Benfica even led the league on some weeks. However, two consecutive losses, caused them to be overtaken by his rivals. They recovered ground, but with a loss against Porto in early February, the gap to the leaders increased to four points, which made it near impossible to recover. So the season fell on the Portuguese Cup, and eliminating Sporting in the round of 16 and beating Porto on the Taça de Portugal final, Benfica won their first trophy in three seasons and first Portuguese Cup in eight.

== Season summary ==
The new season started in an unusual situation for Benfica, as the last time they went two trophy-less seasons was in 1948. Former manager John Mortimore left at the end of his contract and was replaced by Mário Wilson. He was assisted by Peres Bandeira. The season brought significant changes because it was the first time that the club signed foreign players, after a members meet on 1 July 1978 decided to remove that prerequisite. The first foreigner to play for Benfica was Jorge Gomes. Other notable signings were Carlos Manuel, João Laranjeira and César, the latter in December. Major departures included João Alves, Eurico Gomes and José Henrique. To replace Alves, the press speculated on targets like Zico and Michel Platini, but nothing came out of it. The pre-season began on 23 July, and their opening game was on a tournament celebrating the 75 years of Schalke 04, which also included Liverpool. Afterwards, they also played in the celebrations of the 76 years of Boavista and made their presentation game against Botafogo on 17 August.

The first official match was supposed to occur on 25 August, but Benfica postponed it four days, so they could play a friendly abroad. On the 29, Benfica won 5–1 and Jorge Gomes made his historical debut. After the 0–0 draw in Clássico on match-day 3, Benfica shared first place with Porto with five points. However, in the UEFA Cup, the campaign was disappointing, with Benfica unexpectedly losing to Aris on the first round. On the league, Benfica dropped to second after a draw with União de Leiria, but managed to recover and catch Porto on match-day 8. A week later, they beat Sporting in the Lisbon derby, reaching 16 points, ex aequo with Porto in first place. The next week, Benfica lost with Varzim, losing the first place and also Chalana who had a serious injury; they conceded their second loss in a row in the reception to Boavista on match-day 11, dropping to third, four points from the leader. Wilson offered to leave. saying: "I do not have an environment to work peacefully.". Benfica reacted with four consecutive wins that brought them closer to first place, only a point by the end of the first half of the competition.

This recovery would not last as Benfica drew with Vitória de Setúbal on 20 January, losing a point in the race. Two weeks later, in the visit to Estádio das Antas to face Porto, Benfica lost 2–1 and opened a four-point deficit, which Wilson admitted: "is a disadvantage difficult to overcome". But February had also scheduled a Portuguese Cup match against Sporting for the round of 16, which Benfica won by 2–1. Back on the league, despite dropping points with Vitória de Guimarães in early March, Benfica kept the chase to the front two, but could not cut the distance to them, which remained at four points. On 13 April, Benfica visited Estádio de Alvalade to play Sporting, losing 3–1, with the gap to the leader Porto now at six points. Wilson complained of a "skilful" referee. Out of race, Benfica closed April with a draw against Boavista, increasing to seven the difference to the leader. May started with an away win against Varzim, for the semi-finals of the Portuguese Cup. They would meet Porto in the final for the fifth time in history. On 1 June, Benfica ended the Primeira Divisão campaign with 45 points, in third place. Not since 1954 had Benfica gone so long without winning the league. On 7 June, in the Taça de Portugal final in a sold-out stadium, Benfica beat Porto by 1–0 with a goal from César. This win was the first in the competition since 1972 and prevented a third consecutive trophy-less season. Nevertheless, Wilson already knew he was being replaced by Lajos Baróti, as his successor arrived the day before the final.

== Competitions ==
Win Draw Loss Postponed

=== Overall record ===
Competition	First match	Last match	Record								
Competition	First match	Last match	G	W	D	L	GF	GA	GD	Win %	Source
Primeira Divisão	29 August 1979	1 June 1980	30	19	7	4	79	21	+58	63.33	
Taça de Portugal	2 December 1979	7 June 1980	7	7	0	0	20	2	+18	100.00	
UEFA Cup	19 September 1979	3 October 1979	2	1	0	1	3	4	−1	50.00	
Total			39	27	7	5	102	27	+75	69.23	

=== Primeira Divisão ===
==== League table ====
Pos	Team	Pld	W	D	L	GF	GA	GD	Pts	Qualification or relegation
1	Sporting CP (C)	30	24	4	2	67	17	+50	52	Qualification to European Cup first round
2	Porto	30	22	6	2	59	9	+50	50	Qualification to UEFA Cup first round
3	Benfica	30	19	7	4	79	21	+58	45	Qualification to Cup Winners' Cup preliminary round (Note: Benfica qualified for the Cup Winners' Cup as winners of the 1980 Taça de Portugal Final.)
4	Boavista	30	15	7	8	44	30	+14	37	Qualification to UEFA Cup first round
5	Belenenses	30	13	8	9	33	38	−5	34	

Source: RSSSF and footballzz.co.uk
(C) Champions

==== Results by round ====
Round	1	2	3	4	5	6	7	8	9	10	11	12	13	14	15	16	17	18	19	20	21	22	23	24	25	26	27	28	29	30
Ground	H	A	H	A	H	A	H	A	H	A	H	A	H	A	H	A	H	A	H	A	H	A	H	A	H	A	H	A	H	A
Result	W	W	D	W	W	D	W	W	W	L	L	W	W	W	W	D	W	L	W	D	W	W	W	L	W	D	W	D	W	D
Position	1	2	2	2	1	2	2	1	1	2	3	3	3	3	3	3	3	3	3	3	3	3	3	3	3	3	3	3	3	3

Source: ForaDeJogo
A = Away; H = Home; W = Win; D = Draw; L = Loss

==== Matches ====
29 August 1979 1	Benfica	5–1	Vitória de Setúbal	Lisbon
19:00	Pietra 20'; Shéu 42'; Nené 51', 81', 87'	Report	Dário 26'	Stadium: Estádio da Luz; Referee: Alder Dante

2 September 1979 2	Rio Ave	0–3	Benfica	Vila do Conde
18:30		Report	Reinaldo 17'; Jorge Gomes 63', 88'	Stadium: Estádio da Avenida; Referee: António Espanhol

9 September 1979 3	Benfica	0–0	Porto	Lisbon
20:00		Report		Stadium: Estádio da Luz; Referee: António Garrido

17 September 1979 4	Beira-Mar	0–3	Benfica	Aveiro
19:00		Report	Nené 51' (pen.), 68'; Reinaldo 53'	Stadium: Estádio Mário Duarte; Referee: César Correia

23 September 1979 5	Benfica	4–0	Vitória de Guimarães	Lisbon
20:00	Nené 2' (pen.); Reinaldo 44', 83'	Report		Stadium: Estádio da Luz; Referee: Santos Luís

30 September 1979 6	União de Leiria	1–1	Benfica	Leiria
18:00	Edson 74'	Report	Nené 60'	Stadium: Estádio Dr. Magalhães Pessoa; Referee: Rosa Santos

7 October 1979 7	Benfica	4–1	Estoril Praia	Lisbon
19;30	Humberto Coelho 65', 78', 86'; Jorge Gomes 82'	Report	Vitinha 43'	Stadium: Estádio da Luz; Referee: Amândio Silva

21 October 1979 8	Belenenses	0–3	Benfica	Lisbon
18:00		Report	Jorge Gomes 8', 42'; Reinaldo 75'	Stadium: Estádio do Restelo; Referee: Marques Pires

4 November 1979 9	Benfica	3–2	Sporting	Lisbon
20:00	Reinaldo 38'; Alberto 43'; Nené 72' (pen.)	Report	Jordão 52' (pen.); Paulo Meneses 86'	Stadium: Estádio da Luz; Referee: Graça Oliveira

11 November 1979 10	Varzim	2–0	Benfica	Póvoa de Varzim
18:00	José Domingos 25'; Brandão 62'	Report		Stadium: Estádio do Varzim SC; Referee: José Luís Tavares

25 November 1979 11	Benfica	1–2	Boavista	Lisbon
20:00	Cavungi 90'	Report	Júlio 40'; Vítor Baptista 43'	Stadium: Estádio da Luz; Referee: Raúl Nazaré

9 December 1979 12	Espinho	0–3	Benfica	Espinho
18:30		Report	José Luís 52'; Carlos Manuel 84'; Reinaldo 89'	Stadium: Estádio Comendador Manuel Violas; Referee: Manuel Poeira

15 December 1979 13	Benfica	3–1	Braga	Lisbon
20:00	Reinaldo 57', 87'; José Luís 68'	Report	Chico Gordo 89'	Stadium: Estádio da Luz; Referee: António Rodrigues

30 December 1979 14	Portimonense	0–2	Benfica	Portimão
18:00		Report	Humberto Coelho 20'; Reinaldo 78'	Stadium: Estádio Municipal de Portimão; Referee: António Garrido

5 January 1980 15	Benfica	4–0	Marítimo	Lisbon
19:00	César 12'; Nené 54', 63', 80' (pen.)	Report		Stadium: Estádio da Luz; Referee: Inácio Almeida

20 January 1980 16	Vitória de Setúbal	0–0	Benfica	Setúbal
18:00		Report		Stadium: Estádio do Bonfim; Referee: Rosa Santos

27 January 1980 17	Benfica	8–0	Rio Ave	Lisbon
19:00	Reinaldo 6', 63', 71'; Humberto Coelho 10', 75'; Nené 16' (pen.)	Report		Stadium: Estádio da Luz; Referee: António Rodrigues

10 February 1980 18	Porto	2–1	Benfica	Porto
20:00	Rodolfo 53'; Fernando Gomes 73'	Report	Nené 49'	Stadium: Estádio das Antas; Referee: Alder Dante

23 February 1980 19	Benfica	5–0	Beira-Mar	Lisbon
19:00	Nené 2', 26', 28'; Reinaldo 37'; Cavungi 55'	Report		Stadium: Estádio da Luz; Referee: Inácio Almeida

2 March 1980 20	Vitória de Guimarães	0–0	Benfica	Guimarães
18:00		Report		Stadium: Estádio D. Afonso Henriques; Referee: Evaristo Faustino

16 March 1980 21	Benfica	3–0	União de Leiria	Lisbon
20:00	Nené 16', 80'; Shéu 87'	Report		Stadium: Estádio da Luz; Referee: Vitorino Gonçalves

23 March 1980 22	Estoril Praia	0–2	Benfica	Estoril
19:00		Report	Toni 24'; Reinaldo 39'	Stadium: Estádio António Coimbra da Mota; Referee: César Correia

30 March 1980 23	Benfica	8–0	Belenenses	Lisbon
18:00	César 7', 10', 70'; Nené 45', 65', 76', 85' (pen.); Carlos Manuel 60'	Report		Stadium: Estádio da Luz; Referee: António Garrido

13 April 1980 24	Sporting	3–1	Benfica	Lisbon
20:00	Jordão 24', 81' (pen.); Manuel Fernandes 36'	Report	Diamantino 78'	Stadium: Estádio de Alvalade; Referee: Raúl Nazaré

20 April 1980 25	Benfica	4–0	Varzim	Lisbon
20:00	Nené 11', 35', 57' (pen.); Humberto Coelho 54'	Report		Stadium: Estádio da Luz; Referee: Amândio Silva

27 April 1980 26	Boavista	1–1	Benfica	Porto
20:00	Júlio 87'	Report	Diamantino 84'	Stadium: Estádio do Bessa; Referee: Evaristo Faustino

11 May 1980 27	Benfica	4–3	Espinho	Lisbon
18:00	César 7', 13'; Nené 30', 84'	Report	Canavarro 56', 67'; Vitorino 61'	Stadium: Estádio da Luz; Referee: Albino Rodrigues

18 May 1980 28	Braga	1–1	Benfica	Braga
19:00	Jacques 29'	Report	Laranjeira 89'	Stadium: Estádio 1º de Maio; Referee: Alder Dante

25 May 1980 29	Benfica	1–0	Portimonense	Lisbon
20:00	César 88'	Report		Stadium: Estádio da Luz; Referee: Alves Marques

1 June 1980 30	Marítimo	1–1	Benfica	Funchal
20:00	China 24'	Report	César 26'	Stadium: Estádio dos Barreiros; Referee: Santos Luís

=== Taça de Portugal ===
2 December 1979 Third Rd	Benfica	3–0	CUF	Lisbon
19:00	Humberto Coelho 35', 40'; Oliveira 46' (o.g.)	Report		Stadium: Estádio da Luz; Referee: Mário Luís

23 December 1979 Fourth Rd	Benfica	9–0	FC Tadim	Lisbon
19:00	Shéu 19', 84'; Nené 42', 61', 70', 76'; Carlos Manuel 85'; Humberto Coelho 89'	Report		Stadium: Estádio da Luz; Referee: Alves Marques

13 January 1980 Fifth Rd	Benfica	1–0	Portimonense	Lisbon
20:00	Carlos Manuel 23'	Report		Stadium: Estádio da Luz; Attendance: 20,000; Referee: Armando Paraty

17 February 1980 Round of 16	Benfica	2–1	Sporting	Lisbon
20:00	Reinaldo 49'; Nené 53'		Jordão 69' (pen.)	Stadium: Estádio da Luz; Referee: Marques Pires

9 March 1980 Quarter-final	Bragança	0–2	Benfica	Bragança
20:00		Report	Nené 18' (pen.); Humberto Coelho 69'	Stadium: Municipal de Bragança; Referee: Raúl Ribeiro

4 May 1980 Semi-final	Varzim	1–2	Benfica	Póvoa de Varzim
18:00	Horácio 77'	Report	Carlos Manuel 28'; Shéu 76'	Stadium: Estádio do Varzim SC; Referee: César Correia

7 June 1980 Final	Benfica	1–0	Porto	Lisbon
20:00	César 36'	Report		Stadium: Estádio da Luz; Attendance: 40,000; Referee: César Correia

=== UEFA Cup ===
==== First round ====
19 September 1979 First Leg	Aris	3–1	Benfica	Thessaloniki
17:00	Ballis 17'; Pallas 21'; Zindros 58'	Report	Reinaldo 30'	Stadium: Kleanthis Vikelidis Stadium; Attendance: 30,000; Referee: José Luís Tavares

3 October 1979 Second leg	Benfica	2–1 (3–4 agg.)	Aris	Lisbon
21:30	Reinaldo 21'; Jorge Gomes 50'	Report	Semertzidis 80'	Stadium: Estádio da Luz; Attendance: 30,000; Referee: George Courtney

=== Friendlies ===
3 August 1979 75Y Schalke04	Schalke 04	0–1	Benfica	Gelsenkirchen
			Nené 86'	Stadium: Parkstadion; Referee: Heinz Aldinger

5 August 1979 75Y Schalke04	Liverpool	1–1 (a.e.t.) (3–4 p)	Benfica	Gelsenkirchen
	Ray Kennedy 74'		Carlos Alhinho 80'	Stadium: Parkstadion; Referee: Heinz Aldinger
	Penalties
	Phil Neal (penalty scored); David Johnson (penalty scored); Graeme Souness (penalty scored); Ray Kennedy (penalty missed); Alan Hansen (penalty missed)		(penalty scored) Humberto Coelho; (penalty scored) Nené; (penalty missed) Reinaldo; (penalty missed) José Luís; (penalty scored) Manuel Bento; (penalty scored) Minervino Pietra

11 August 1979 76Y Boavista	Boavista	0–2	Benfica	Porto
			Reinaldo 30'; Shéu 83'	Stadium: Estádio do Bessa; Referee: Fernando Alberto

17 August 1979	Benfica	1–2	Botafogo	Lisbon
	Reinaldo 34'		Luizinho Lemos 10', 56'	Stadium: Estádio da Luz; Attendance: 40,000; Referee: Graça Oliva

21 August 1979	Olhanense	1–2	Benfica	Olhão
	Ailton		Frederico; Toni	Stadium: Estádio Padinha

22 August 1979	Lusitano VRSA	0–3	Benfica	Vila Real de Santo António
			Cavungi	Stadium: Campo de Jogos Francisco Gomes Socorro

26 August 1979	Jeunesse Esch	0–4	Benfica	Esch-sur-Alzette
			Reinaldo; Fonseca; Nené	Stadium: Stade de la Frontière

26 August 1979	Industrial Vieirense	1–7	Benfica	Marinha Grande
	Lavos 90'		Jorge Silva 12', 84'; Cavungi 36', 56'; Carlos Manuel 76', 81', 89'	Stadium: Estádio Alba Tomé Feteira

9 January 1980 Taça de Honra	Benfica	5–1	Estoril Praia	Lisbon
	Humberto Coelho 11'; César 31'; Shéu 39', 47'; Erik Andersson 75' (o.g.)		José António 73'	Stadium: Estádio da Luz; Referee: Purificação Correia

16 January 1980 Taça de Honra	Benfica	3–2	Belenenses	Lisbon
	César 24', 57'; Reinaldo 70'		Francisco González 47'; Luís Horta 61'	Stadium: Estádio de Alvalade; Attendance: 5,000; Referee: João Cerdela

31 January 1980 Vitor Martins Tstm	Benfica	2–1	Dynamo Moscow	Lisbon
	Alberto Fonseca 58'; César 65'		Yuri Reznik 81'	Stadium: Estádio da Luz; Attendance: 40,000; Referee: Graça Oliva

26 February 1980 76Y Anniversary	Benfica	4–0	Southampton	Lisbon
	Reinaldo 32', 65'; Carlos Manuel 74'; Nené 81'			Stadium: Estádio da Luz; Referee: Nemésio do Castro

20 May 1980 Paris TM	Standard Liège	1–1 (5–4 p)	Benfica	Paris
	Riedl 57' (pen.)		Nené 25'	Stadium: Parc des Princes; Referee: Muchendled
	Penalties
	Riedl (penalty scored); Helmut Graf (penalty scored); Jos Daerden (penalty missed); Ásgeir Sigurvinsson (penalty scored); Christian Labarbe (penalty scored); Luís Norton de Matos (penalty scored)		(penalty scored) Nené; (penalty scored) Humberto Coelho; (penalty scored) José Luís; (penalty missed) César; (penalty scored) Manuel Bento; (penalty missed) Shéu

22 May 1980 Paris TM	Ajax	1–5	Benfica	Paris
	Søren Lerby 83'		Nené 21', 39', 63', 66', 77'	Stadium: Parc des Princes; Attendance: 2,000

28 May 1980 Azores earthquake	Benfica	1–0	Sporting	Funchal
	Reinaldo 23'			Stadium: Estádio dos Barreiros

13 June 1980 Caracas TM	Colombia	0–1	Benfica	Caracas
			Reinaldo 79'	Stadium: Estadio Olímpico; Attendance: 20,000

14 June 1980 Caracas TM	Real Madrid	2–1	Benfica	Caracas
	Angel 3'; Laurie Cunningham 83'		José Luís 37'	Stadium: Estadio Olímpico; Attendance: 25,000

18 June 1980	Honduras	1–2	Benfica	Tegucigalpa
				Stadium: Estadio Tiburcio Carías Andino

22 June 1980	Honduras	2–3	Benfica	San Pedro Sula
				Stadium: Estadio Francisco Morazán

== Player statistics ==
The squad for the season consisted of the players listed in the tables below, as well as staff member Mário Wilson (manager), Peres Bandeira (assistant manager), Romão Martins (Director of Football).

Note 1: Note: Flags indicate national team as defined under FIFA eligibility rules. Players may hold more than one non-FIFA nationality.

Note 2: Players with squad numbers marked ‡ joined the club during the 1979-80 season via transfer, with more details in the following section.

No.	Pos	Nat	Player	Total		Primeira Divisão		Taça de Portugal		UEFA Cup	
No.	Pos	Nat	Player	Apps	Goals	Apps	Goals	Apps	Goals	Apps	Goals
1	GK	(Portugal) POR	Manuel Bento	37	0	29	0	6	0	2	0
1	GK	(Portugal) POR	António Botelho	2	0	1	0	1	0	0	0
2	DF	(Portugal) POR	Minervino Pietra	26	1	20	1	4	0	2	0
2	DF	(Portugal) POR	Alberto Fonseca	38	1	29	1	7	0	2	0
3	DF	(Portugal) POR	Humberto Coelho	39	11	30	7	7	4	2	0
4	DF	(Portugal) POR	João Laranjeira	17	1	14	1	3	0	0	0
4	DF	(Portugal) POR	Frederico Rosa	2	0	0	0	2	0	0	0
4	DF	(Portugal) POR	Carlos Alhinho	26	0	21	0	3	0	2	0
4	DF	(Portugal) POR	Joaquim Pereirinha	1	0	0	0	1	0	0	0
5	DF	(Portugal) POR	António Bastos Lopes	38	0	30	0	6	0	2	0
5	MF	(Portugal) POR	Mário Wilson	1	0	1	0	0	0	0	0
6	MF	(Portugal) POR	José Luís	10	2	9	2	1	0	0	0
6	MF	(Portugal) POR	Carlos Manuel	31	5	24	2	7	3	0	0
6	MF	(Portugal) POR	Toni	30	1	21	1	7	0	2	0
7	FW	(Portugal) POR	Nené	39	36	30	30	7	6	2	0
8	FW	(Portugal) POR	Reinaldo Gomes	32	19	24	15	6	2	2	2
9	FW	(Brazil) BRA	Jorge Gomes	15	6	13	5	1	0	1	1
9	FW	(Brazil) BRA	César Oliveira	15	9	12	8	3	1	0	0
10	MF	(Portugal) POR	Orlando Fonseca	15	0	12	0	2	0	1	0
10	MF	(Portugal) POR	Fernando Chalana	10	0	8	0	0	0	2	0
11	MF	(Portugal) POR	Shéu	39	5	30	2	7	3	2	0
11	FW	(Portugal) POR	Cavungi	7	2	6	2	1	0	0	0
11	FW	(Portugal) POR	Diamantino Miranda	11	2	9	2	2	0	0	0

== Transfers ==
=== In ===
Entry date	Position	Player	From club	Fee	Ref
19 June 1979	DF	João Laranjeira	Sporting CP	Undisclosed	
7 July 1979	FW	Jorge Gomes	Boavista	Undisclosed	
24 July 1979	MF	Carlos Manuel	Barreirense	Undisclosed	
24 July 1979	DF	Frederico Rosa	Barreirense	Undisclosed	
24 July 1979	GK	António Botelho	Sporting CP	Undisclosed	
2 August 1979	FW	Orlando Fonseca	Estoril Praia	Loan return	
13 December 1979	FW	César	América	Undisclosed	

=== Out ===
Exit date	Position	Player	To club	Fee	Ref
27 June 1979	FW	Rui Lopes	Marítimo	Undisclosed	
9 July 1979	MF	João Alves	Paris Saint-Germain	Undisclosed	
26 July 1979	MF	Joaquim Simões	Académico de Viseu	Free	
1 August 1979	DF	Eurico Gomes	Sporting CP	Undisclosed	
1 August 1979	GK	António Fidalgo	Sporting CP	Undisclosed	
3 August 1979	GK	José Henrique	Nacional	Free	

=== Out by loan ===
Exit date	Position	Player	To club	Return date	Ref
13 July 1979	DF	Alberto Bastos Lopes	Estoril Praia	30 June 1980	
26 July 1979	FW	João Santos	Estoril Praia	30 June 1980	
10 August 1979	MF	Adriano Spencer	Atlético	30 June 1980	
