= Portugal national football team results (1960–1979) =

Portugal National Football Team Results

This page is a list of all the matches that Portugal national football team has played between 1960 and 1979.

== Results ==
Key
Win
Draw
Defeat

== 1960s ==
=== 1960 ===
27 April 1960 Friendly	West Germany	2–1	Portugal	(West Germany) Südweststadion, Ludwigshafen am Rhein
	Uwe Seeler 35'; Helmut Rahn 61'		70' Domiciano Cavém	Attendance: 45,000; Referee: (England) Kevin Howley

8 May 1960 (France) 1960 EURO 1/4	Portugal	2–1	Yugoslavia	(Portugal) Estádio Nacional, Lisbon
	Joaquim Santana 30'; Matateu 70'		81' Bora Kostić	Attendance: 50,000; Referee: (France) Joseph Barberan

22 May 1960 (France) 1960 EURO 1/4	Yugoslavia	5–1	Portugal	(Socialist Federal Republic of Yugoslavia) Stadion FK Partizan, Belgrade
	Dragoslav Šekularac 8'; Zvezdan Cebinac 45'; Bora Kostić 50', 80'; Milan Galic 68'		29' Domiciano Cavém	Attendance: 43,000; Referee: (Austria) Josef Stoll

=== 1961 ===
19 March 1961 (Chile) 1962 W.C. Q	Portugal	6–0	Luxembourg	(Portugal) Estádio Nacional, Lisbon
	José Águas 32'; Yaúca 49', 53', 61'; Fernand Brosius 83' (o.g.); Mário Coluna 85'			Attendance: 17,000; Referee: (Switzerland) Daniel Mellet

21 May 1961 (Chile) 1962 W.C. Q	Portugal	1–1	England	(Portugal) Estádio Nacional, Lisbon
	José Águas 59'		62' Ron Flowers	Attendance: 65,000; Referee: (Italy) Pietro Bonetto

4 June 1961 Friendly	Portugal	0–2	Argentina	(Portugal) Estádio Nacional, Lisbon
			52' Pando; 81' Sanfilippo	Attendance: 65,000; Referee: (Spain) Manuel Asensi Martín

8 October 1961 (Chile) 1962 W.C. Q	Luxembourg	4–2	Portugal	(Luxembourg) Stade Municipal, Lëtzebuerg
	Ady Schmit 27', 53', 56'; Nicky Hoffmann 84'		83' Eusébio; 89' Yaúca	Attendance: 6,000; Referee: (West Germany) Kurt Tschenscher

25 October 1961 (Chile) 1962 W.C. Q	England	2–0	Portugal	(England) Wembley Stadium (1923), London
	John Connelly 5'; Ray Pointer 9'			Attendance: 100,000; Referee: (France) Marcel Bois

=== 1962 ===
6 May 1962 Friendly	Brazil	2–1	Portugal	(Brazil) Estádio do Pacaembu, São Paulo
	Mário Zagallo 25'; Zequinha 56'		9' Mário Coluna	Attendance: 52,936; Referee: (Chile) Claudio Vicuña

9 May 1962 Friendly	Brazil	1–0	Portugal	(Brazil) Maracanã, Rio de Janeiro
	Pelé 56'			Attendance: 65,000; Referee: (Chile) Cláudio Vicuña Larrain

17 May 1962 Friendly	Portugal	1–2	Belgium	(Portugal) Estádio José Alvalade (1956), Lisbon
	Eusébio 51'		6' Jacques Stockman; 9' Armand Jurion	Attendance: 20,000; Referee: (Spain) Juan Gardeazábal Garay

7 November 1962 (Spain) 1964 EURO Q	Bulgaria	3–1	Portugal	(Bulgaria) Vasil Levski National Stadium, Sofia
	Georgi Asparuhov 65', 76'; Todor Diev 85'		49' Eusébio	Attendance: 31,318; Referee: (Turkey) Semih Zoroglu

16 December 1962 (Spain) 1964 EURO Q	Portugal	3–1	Bulgaria	(Portugal) Estádio do Restelo, Lisbon
	Hernâni 4', 26'; Mário Coluna 54'		84' Hristo Iliev	Attendance: 25,836; Referee: (France) Henri Faucheux

=== 1963 ===
23 January 1963 (Spain) 1964 EURO Q	Bulgaria	1–0	Portugal	(Italy) Stadio Olimpico, Rome
	Georgi Asparuhov 86'			Attendance: 2,336; Referee: (Italy) Giuseppe Adami

21 April 1963 Friendly	Portugal	1–0	Brazil	(Portugal) Estádio Nacional, Lisbon
	José Augusto 72'			Attendance: 70,000; Referee: (France) Henri Faucheux

=== 1964 ===
29 April 1964 Friendly	Switzerland	2–3	Portugal	(Switzerland) Hardturm, Zürich
	Américo Lopes 39' (o.g.); Norbert Eschmann 87' (pen.)		30' José Torres; 35' António Simões; 49' José Augusto	Attendance: 14,373; Referee: (France) Jean Tricot

3 May 1964 Friendly	Belgium	1–2	Portugal	(Belgium) Stade du Heysel, Brussels
	Paul Van Den Berg 67'		22' Eusébio; 76' José Augusto	Attendance: 20,508; Referee: (Netherlands) Leopold Horn

17 May 1964 Friendly	Portugal	3–4	England	(Portugal) Estádio Nacional, Lisbon
	José Torres 18', 47'; Eusébio 53'		21', 57', 88' Johnny Byrne; 29' Bobby Charlton	Attendance: 40,000; Referee: (Spain) Juan Gardeazábal Garay

31 May 1964 (Brazil) Taça das Nações	Argentina	2–0	Portugal	(Brazil) Maracaña, Rio de Janeiro
	Alfredo Rojas 58'; Alberto Rendo 89'			Attendance: 40,000; Referee: (Netherlands) Leopold Horn

4 June 1964 (Brazil) Taça das Nações	England	1–1	Portugal	(Brazil) Estádio do Pacaembu, São Paulo
	Roger Hunt 58'		42' Fernando Peres	Attendance: 25,000; Referee: (Brazil) Armando Marques

7 June 1964 (Brazil) Taça das Nações	Brazil	4–1	Portugal	(Brazil) Maracaña, Rio de Janeiro
	Pelé 10'; Jairzinho 21'; Gérson 76', 80'		27' Mário Coluna	Attendance: 60,000; Referee: (France) Pierre Schwinte

15 November 1964 Friendly	Portugal	2–1	Spain	(Portugal) Estádio das Antas, Porto
	Eusébio 39', 70'		25' Fusté	Attendance: 50,000; Referee: (Netherlands) Pieter Roomer

=== 1965 ===
24 January 1965 (England) 1966 W.C. Q	Portugal	5–1	Turkey	(Portugal) Estádio Nacional, Lisbon
	Mário Coluna 17'; Eusébio 20', 63', 70'; Jaime Graça 52'		33' Fevzi Zemzem	Attendance: 33,237; Referee: (Spain) Juan Gardeazábal Garay

19 April 1965 (England) 1966 W.C. Q	Turkey	0–1	Portugal	(Turkey) Ankara 19 Mayis Stadium, Ankara
			59' Eusébio	Attendance: 27,625; Referee: (Syria) Rachid Dachan

25 April 1965 (England) 1966 W.C. Q	Czechoslovakia	0–1	Portugal	(Czechoslovakia) Tehelné pole, Bratislava
			20' Eusébio	Attendance: 56,975; Referee: (Bulgaria) Atanas Stavrev

13 June 1965 (England) 1966 W.C. Q	Portugal	2–1	Romania	(Portugal) Estádio Nacional, Lisbon
	Eusébio 14', 39'		73' Sorin Avram	Attendance: 45,646; Referee: (France) Michel Kitabdjian

24 June 1965 Friendly	Portugal	0–0	Brazil	(Portugal) Estádio das Antas, Porto
				Attendance: 45,000; Referee: (Switzerland) Karl Keller

31 October 1965 (England) 1966 W.C. Q	Portugal	0–0	Czechoslovakia	(Portugal) Estádio das Antas, Porto
				Attendance: 31,432; Referee: (Netherlands) Leopold Horn

21 November 1965 (England) 1966 W.C. Q	Romania	2–0	Portugal	(Romania) Stadionul National (1953), Bucharest
	Ion Pârcălab 1'; Alexandru Badea 43'			Attendance: 50,500; Referee: (Switzerland) Gottfried Dienst

=== 1966 ===
12 June 1966 Friendly	Portugal	4–0	Norway	(Portugal) Estádio Nacional, Lisbon
	Eusébio 9', 36'; José Augusto 24', 63'			Attendance: 20,000; Referee: (Spain) Gaspar Pintado Viú

18 June 1966 Friendly	Scotland	0–1	Portugal	(Scotland) Hampden Park, Glasgow
			72' José Torres	Attendance: 23,332; Referee: (England) George McCabe

21 June 1966 Friendly	Denmark	1–3	Portugal	(Denmark) Idrætsparken, Copenhagen
	Ulrik le Fevre 58'		12' Eusébio; 56', 77' José Torres	Attendance: 14,500; Referee: (West Germany) Günther Baumgärtel

26 June 1966 Friendly	Portugal	3–0	Uruguay	(Portugal) Estádio Nacional, Lisbon
	José Torres 7', 57', 64'			Attendance: 35,000; Referee: (Switzerland) Karl Keller

3 July 1966 Friendly	Portugal	1–0	Romania	(Portugal) Estádio das Antas, Porto
	José Torres 1'			Attendance: 25,000; Referee: (Switzerland) Anton Bucheli

13 July 1966 (England) 1966 W.C. GS	Portugal	3–1	Hungary	(England) Old Trafford, Manchester
19:30 WET	José Augusto 1', 67'; José Torres 90'		60' Ferenc Bene	Attendance: 37,311; Referee: (Wales) Leo Callaghan

16 July 1966 (England) 1966 W.C. GS	Portugal	3–0	Bulgaria	(England) Old Trafford, Manchester
15:00 WET	Ivan Vutsov 17' (o.g.); Eusébio 38'; José Torres 81'			Attendance: 33,355; Referee: (Uruguay) José María Codesal

19 July 1966 (England) 1966 W.C. GS	Portugal	3–1	Brazil	(England) Goodison Park, Liverpool
19:30 WET	António Simões 15'; Eusébio 27', 85'		70' Rildo	Attendance: 62,204; Referee: (England) George McCabe

23 July 1966 (England) 1966 W.C. 1/4	Portugal	5–3	North Korea	(England) Goodison Park, Liverpool
15:00 WET	Eusébio 27', 43' (pen.), 56', 59' (pen.); José Augusto 80'		1' Pak Seung-Zin; 22' Lee Dong-Woon; 25' Yang Sung-Kook	Attendance: 51,780; Referee: (Israel) Menachem Ashkenazi

26 July 1966 (England) 1966 W.C. 1/2	England	2–1	Portugal	(England) Wembley Stadium (1923), London
19:30 WET	Bobby Charlton 30', 80'		82' (pen.) Eusébio	Attendance: 94,493; Referee: (France) Pierre Schwinte

28 July 1966 (England) 1966 W.C. 3–4	Portugal	2–1	Soviet Union	(England) Wembley Stadium (1923), London
19:30 WET	Eusébio 12' (pen.); José Torres 89'		43' Eduard Malofeyev	Attendance: 87,696; Referee: (England) Ken Dagnall

13 November 1966 (Italy) 1968 EURO Q	Portugal	1–2	Sweden	(Portugal) Estádio Nacional, Lisbon
	Jaime Graça 21'		29', 87' Inge Danielsson	Attendance: 35,000; Referee: (Luxembourg) Jacques Coiling

=== 1967 ===
27 March 1967 Friendly	Italy	1–1	Portugal	(Italy) Stadio Olimpico, Rome
	Renato Cappellini 74'		24' Eusébio	Attendance: 65,000; Referee: (England) Jim Finney

1 June 1967 (Italy) 1968 EURO Q	Sweden	1–1	Portugal	(Sweden) Råsunda Stadium, Solna
	Ingvar Svensson 90'		20' Custódio Pinto	Attendance: 49,689; Referee: (England) Kevin Howley

8 June 1967 (Italy) 1968 EURO Q	Norway	1–2	Portugal	(Norway) Ullevaal Stadion, Oslo
	Odd Iversen 35'		15', 61' Eusébio	Attendance: 31,151; Referee: (Scotland) William Syme

12 November 1967 (Italy) 1968 EURO Q	Portugal	2–1	Norway	(Portugal) Estádio das Antas, Porto
	José Torres 29'; Jaime Graça 65'		40' Olav Nilsen	Attendance: 20,500; Referee: (France) Michel Kitabdjian

26 November 1967 (Italy) 1968 EURO Q	Bulgaria	1–0	Portugal	(Bulgaria) Vasil Levski National Stadium, Sofia
	Dinko Dermendzhiev 63'			Attendance: 39,795; Referee: (Soviet Union) Anvar Zverev

17 December 1967 (Italy) 1968 EURO Q	Portugal	0–0	Bulgaria	(Portugal) Estádio Nacional, Lisbon
				Attendance: 13,408; Referee: (Italy) Antonio Sbardella

=== 1968 ===
30 June 1968 Friendly	Portugal	0–2	Brazil	(Portugal) Estádio da Machava, Lourenço Marques
			57' Rivellino; 87' Tostão	Attendance: 60,000; Referee: (Spain) Adolfo Bueno Perales

27 October 1968 (Mexico) 1970 W.C. Q	Portugal	3–0	Romania	(Portugal) Estádio Nacional, Lisbon
	Jacinto Santos 21', 72'; Jacinto João 33'			Attendance: 32,222; Referee: (Wales) Leo Callaghan

11 December 1968 (Mexico) 1970 W.C. Q	Greece	4–2	Portugal	(Greece) Karaiskakis Stadium, Piraeus
	Mimis Papaioannou 33'; Giorgos Dedes 37'; José Torres 49' (o.g.); Giorgos Sideris 61'		17' José Augusto; 64' Eusébio	Attendance: 36,750; Referee: (West Germany) Gerhard Schulenburg

=== 1969 ===
6 April 1969 Friendly	Portugal	0–0	Mexico	(Portugal) Estádio Nacional, Lisbon
				Attendance: 30,000; Referee: (Spain) Gaspar Pintado Viú

16 April 1969 (Mexico) 1970 W.C. Q	Portugal	0–2	Switzerland	(Portugal) Estádio José Alvalade (1956), Lisbon
			21', 36' Georges Vuilleumier	Attendance: 9,324; Referee: (England) Jack Taylor

4 May 1969 (Mexico) 1970 W.C. Q	Portugal	2–2	Greece	(Portugal) Estádio das Antas, Porto
	Eusébio 82'; Fernando Peres 86'		68' Vasilis Botinos; 74' Konstantinos Eleftherakis	Attendance: 6,221; Referee: (Tunisia) Moncef Ben Ali

12 October 1969 (Mexico) 1970 W.C. Q	Romania	1–0	Portugal	(Romania) Stadionul National (1953), Bucharest
	Nicolae Dobrin 30'			Attendance: 58,573; Referee: (Socialist Federal Republic of Yugoslavia) Ratko Canak

2 November 1969 (Mexico) 1970 W.C. Q	Switzerland	1–1	Portugal	(Switzerland) Wankdorf Stadium, Bern
	Fritz Künzli 88'		40' Eusébio	Attendance: 28,807; Referee: (Sweden) Bo Nilsson

10 December 1969 Friendly	England	1–0	Portugal	(England) Wembley Stadium (1923), London
	Jack Charlton 24'			Attendance: 100,000; Referee: (France) Roger Mouton

== 1970s ==
=== 1970 ===
10 May 1970 Friendly	Portugal	1–2	Italy	(Portugal) Estádio Nacional, Lisbon
	Humberto Coelho 85'		38', 67' Gigi Riva	Attendance: 20,711; Referee: (Spain) Antonio Camacho Jiménez

14 October 1970 (Belgium) 1972 EURO Q	Denmark	0–1	Portugal	(Denmark) Idrætsparken, Copenhagen
			40' Jacinto João	Attendance: 17,317; Referee: (Wales) Leo Callaghan

=== 1971 ===
17 February 1971 (Belgium) 1972 EURO Q	Belgium	3–0	Portugal	(Belgium) Émile Versé Stadium, Anderlecht
	Raoul Lambert 14', 64' (pen.); André De Nul 75'			Attendance: 26,821; Referee: (Spain) Gaspar Pintado Viú

21 April 1971 (Belgium) 1972 EURO Q	Portugal	2–0	Scotland	(Portugal) Estádio da Luz (1954), Lisbon
	Patrick Stanton 22' (o.g.); Eusébio 83'			Attendance: 35,463; Referee: (France) Michel Kitabdjian

12 May 1971 (Belgium) 1972 EURO Q	Portugal	5–0	Denmark	(Portugal) Estádio das Antas, Porto
	Rui Rodrigues 17'; Eusébio 42'; Vítor Baptista 47', 49'; Andersen Sandvad 81'			Attendance: 16,392; Referee: (Northern Ireland) Malcolm Wright

13 October 1971 (Belgium) 1972 EURO Q	Scotland	2–1	Portugal	(Scotland) Hampden Park, Glasgow
	John O'Hare 22'; Archie Gemmill 58'		56' Rui Rodrigues	Attendance: 58,612; Referee: (Poland) Brunon Piotrowicz

21 November 1971 (Belgium) 1972 EURO Q	Portugal	1–1	Belgium	(Portugal) Estádio da Luz (1954), Lisbon
	Fernando Peres 90' (pen.)		61' Raoul Lambert	Attendance: 53,577; Referee: (England) Ken Burns

=== 1972 ===
29 March 1972 (West Germany) 1974 W.C. Q	Portugal	4–0	Cyprus	(Portugal) Estádio da Luz (1954), Lisbon
	Humberto Coelho 7'; Nené 17'; Artur Jorge 46'; Rui Jordão 81'			Attendance: 5,801; Referee: (Belgium) Vital Loraux

10 May 1972 (West Germany) 1974 W.C. Q	Cyprus	0–1	Portugal	(Cyprus) GSP Stadium (1902), Nicosia
			36' Chico Faria	Attendance: 7,643; Referee: (Romania) Kevork Ghemigean

11 June 1972 (Brazil) Brazilian Independence Cup GS	Ecuador	0–3	Portugal	(Brazil) Machadão, Natal
			36' Eusébio; 59' Joaquim Dinis; 75' Nené	Attendance: 25,000; Referee: (Argentina) Ángel Coerezza

14 June 1972 (Brazil) Brazilian Independence Cup GS	Iran	0–3	Portugal	(Brazil) Estádio do Arruda, Recife
			13' Eusébio; 31' Joaquim Dinis; 72' Humberto Coelho	Attendance: 12,000; Referee: (Colombia) Guillermo Velasquez

18 June 1972 (Brazil) Brazilian Independence Cup GS	Chile	1–4	Portugal	(Brazil) Estádio do Arruda, Recife
	Carlos Caszely 56'		14' Humberto Coelho; 54', 66' Joaquim Dinis; 71' Eusébio	Attendance: 15,736; Referee: (Italy) Aurelio Angonese

25 June 1972 (Brazil) Brazilian Independence Cup GS	Portugal	2–1	Republic of Ireland	(Brazil) Estádio do Arruda, Recife
	Fernando Peres 35'; Nené 36'		38' Mick Leech	Attendance: 12,665; Referee: (Argentina) Ángel Coerezza

29 June 1972 (Brazil) Brazilian Independence Cup 2R	Argentina	1–3	Portugal	(Brazil) Maracanã, Rio de Janeiro
	Brindisi 39'		38' Adolfo Calisto; 45' Eusébio; 47' Joaquim Dinis	Attendance: 30,000; Referee: (Wales) Keith Walker

2 July 1972 (Brazil) Brazilian Independence Cup 2R	Uruguay	1–1	Portugal	(Brazil) Maracanã, Rio de Janeiro
	Ricardo Pavoni 19'		44' Jaime Graça	Attendance: 45,590; Referee: (Switzerland) Rudolf Scheurer

6 July 1972 (Brazil) Brazilian Independence Cup 2R	Portugal	1–0	Soviet Union	(Brazil) Mineirão, Belo Horizonte
	Rui Jordão 47'			Attendance: 12,000; Referee: (West Germany) Kurt Tschenscher

10 July 1972 (Brazil) Brazilian Independence Cup F	Brazil	1–0	Portugal	(Brazil) Maracanã, Rio de Janeiro
	Jairzinho 89'			Attendance: 99,138; Referee: (Israel) Abraham Klein

=== 1973 ===
3 March 1973 Friendly	France	1–2	Portugal	(France) Parc des Princes, Paris
	Marc Molitor 36'		38' (pen.), 87' Eusébio	Attendance: 45,267; Referee: (Belgium) Franz Geluck

28 March 1973 (West Germany) 1974 W.C. Q	Northern Ireland	1–1	Portugal	(England) Highfield Road, Coventry
	Martin O'Neill 18'		84' (pen.) Eusébio	Attendance: 11,238; Referee: (Austria) Paul Schiller

2 May 1973 (West Germany) 1974 W.C. Q	Bulgaria	2–1	Portugal	(Bulgaria) Vasil Levski National Stadium, Sofia
	Georgi Denev 38'; Hristo Bonev 60'		74' Nené	Attendance: 49,300; Referee: (Socialist Federal Republic of Yugoslavia) Milivoje Gugulovic

13 October 1973 (West Germany) 1974 W.C. Q	Portugal	2–2	Bulgaria	(Portugal) Estádio da Luz (1954), Lisbon
	António Simões 48'; Alfredo Quaresma 89'		56', 65' Hristo Bonev	Attendance: 13,000; Referee: (England) Jack Taylor

14 November 1973 (West Germany) 1974 W.C. Q	Portugal	1–1	Northern Ireland	(Portugal) Estádio José Alvalade (1956), Lisbon
	Rui Jordão 34'		68' Liam O'Kane	Attendance: 6,713; Referee: (Spain) Pablo Sánchez Ibáñez

=== 1974 ===
3 April 1974 Friendly	Portugal	0–0	England	(Portugal) Estádio da Luz (1954), Lisbon
				Attendance: 10,000; Referee: (Spain) Emilio Carlos Guruceta Muro

13 November 1974 Friendly	Switzerland	3–0	Portugal	(Switzerland) Wankdorf Stadium, Bern
	Daniel Jeandupeux 9'; Hans-Jörg Pfister 43'; Hanspeter Schild 65' (pen.)			Attendance: 12,500; Referee: (Netherlands) Joop Vervoort

20 November 1974 (Socialist Federal Republic of Yugoslavia) 1976 EURO Q	England	0–0	Portugal	(England) Wembley Stadium (1923), London
				Attendance: 84,461; Referee: (Switzerland) Anton Bucheli

=== 1975 ===
9 March 1975 Friendly	Goiás Selection	2–1	Portugal	(Brazil) Estádio Serra Dourada, Goiânia
	Lincoln 26'; Tuíra 85'		4' Octávio Machado	Attendance: 79,610; Referee: (Brazil) Armando Marques

26 April 1975 Friendly	France	0–2	Portugal	(France) Stade Olympique Yves-du-Manoir, Colombes
			21' Nené; 64' Marinho	Attendance: 24,816; Referee: (West Germany) Hans-Joachim Weyland

30 April 1975 (Socialist Federal Republic of Yugoslavia) 1976 EURO Q	Czechoslovakia	5–0	Portugal	(Czechoslovakia) Letná Stadium, Prague
	Přemysl Bičovský 11', 22'; Zdenek Nehoda 25', 46'; Ladislav Petráš 52'			Attendance: 12,034; Referee: (West Germany) Ferdinand Biwersi

13 May 1975 Friendly	Scotland	1–0	Portugal	(Scotland) Hampden Park, Glasgow
	Artur Correia 43' (o.g.)			Attendance: 34,307; Referee: (England) Bob Matthewson

8 June 1975 (Socialist Federal Republic of Yugoslavia) 1976 EURO Q	Cyprus	0–2	Portugal	(Cyprus) Tsirion Stadium, Limassol
			25' Nené; 89' Mário Moinhos	Attendance: 8,615; Referee: (Romania) Gheorghe Limona

12 November 1975 (Socialist Federal Republic of Yugoslavia) 1976 EURO Q	Portugal	1–1	Czechoslovakia	(Portugal) Estádio das Antas, Porto
	Nené 8'		7' Anton Ondruš	Attendance: 40,000; Referee: (Netherlands) Charles Corver

19 November 1975 (Socialist Federal Republic of Yugoslavia) 1976 EURO Q	Portugal	1–1	England	(Portugal) Estádio José Alvalade (1956), Lisbon
	Rui Rodrigues 16'		42' Mick Channon	Attendance: 60,000; Referee: (Austria) Erich Linemayr

3 December 1975 (Socialist Federal Republic of Yugoslavia) 1976 EURO Q	Portugal	1–0	Cyprus	(Portugal) Estádio do Bonfim, Setúbal
	João Alves 20'			Attendance: 4,000; Referee: (Malta) Richard Casha

=== 1976 ===
7 April 1976 Friendly	Italy	3–1	Portugal	(Italy) Stadio Olimpico di Torino, Turin
	Giancarlo Antognoni 45'; Francesco Graziani 62'; Paolo Pulici 70'		82' Samuel Fraguito	Attendance: 36,121; Referee: (Hungary) Károly Palotai

16 October 1976 (Argentina) 1978 W.C. Q	Portugal	0–2	Poland	(Portugal) Estádio das Antas, Porto
			49', 77' Grzegorz Lato	Attendance: 30,000; Referee: (France) Michel Kitabdjian

17 November 1976 (Argentina) 1978 W.C. Q	Portugal	1–0	Denmark	(Portugal) Estádio da Luz (1954), Lisbon
	Manuel Fernandes I 69'			Attendance: 35,000; Referee: (Algeria) Abelkalder Auossi

5 December 1976 (Argentina) 1978 W.C. Q	Cyprus	1–2	Portugal	(Cyprus) Tsirion Stadium, Limassol
	Stavros Stylianou 74' (pen.)		36' Fernando Chalana; 76' Nené	Attendance: 7,000; Referee: (Romania) Constantin Ghita

22 December 1976 Friendly	Portugal	2–1	Italy	(Portugal) Estádio José Alvalade (1956), Lisbon
	Nené 16', 66'		78' Roberto Bettega	Attendance: 36,121; Referee: (Spain) Emilio Carlos Guruceta Muro

=== 1977 ===
30 March 1977 Friendly	Portugal	1–0	Switzerland	(Portugal) Estádio dos Barreiros, Funchal
	João Alves 50'			Attendance: 10,000; Referee: (England) Gordon Kew

9 October 1977 (Argentina) 1978 W.C. Q	Denmark	2–4	Portugal	(Denmark) Idrætsparken, Copenhagen
	Per Røntved 45' (pen.); Allan Hansen 88'	Report	15' Rui Jordão; 35' Nené; 61' Manuel Fernandes I 79' Octávio Machado	Attendance: 23,300; Referee: (Soviet Union) Eldar Azimzade

29 October 1977 (Argentina) 1978 W.C. Q	Poland	1–1	Portugal	(Poland) Silesian Stadium, Chorzów
	Kazimierz Deyna 36'	Report	61' Manuel Fernandes I	Attendance: 80,000; Referee: (West Germany) Walter Eschweiler

16 November 1977 (Argentina) 1978 W.C. Q	Portugal	4–0	Cyprus	(Portugal) Estádio de São Luís, Faro
	Toni 11'; Fernando Chalana 35'; Francisco Vital 58'; Manuel Fernandes I 71'	Report		Attendance: 13,000; Referee: (Czechoslovakia) Michal Jursa

=== 1978 ===
8 March 1978 Friendly	France	2–0	Portugal	(France) Parc des Princes, Paris
	Bruno Baronchelli 9'; Marc Berdoll 40'	Report		Attendance: 42,241; Referee: (Belgium) Alexis Ponnet

20 September 1978 Friendly	Portugal	1–0	United States	(Portugal) Estádio do Bonfim, Setúbal
	José Alberto Costa 31'	Report		Attendance: 5,000; Referee: (Portugal) Inácio de Almeida

11 October 1978 (Italy) 1980 EURO Q	Portugal	1–1	Belgium	(Portugal) Estádio José Alvalade (1956), Lisbon
	Eurico Gomes 31'	Report	37' Franky Vercauteren	Attendance: 20,000; Referee: (France) Georges Konrath

15 November 1978 (Italy) 1980 EURO Q	Austria	1–2	Portugal	(Austria) Praterstadion, Vienna
	Walter Schachner 74'	Report	30' Nené; 90' Alberto Júnior	Attendance: 64,024; Referee: (Romania) Nicolae Rainea

29 November 1978 (Italy) 1980 EURO Q	Portugal	1–0	Scotland	(Portugal) Estádio da Luz (1954), Lisbon
	Alberto Júnior 28'	Report		Attendance: 70,000; Referee: (Switzerland) Ernst Dörflinger

=== 1979 ===
9 May 1979 (Italy) 1980 EURO Q	Norway	0–1	Portugal	(Norway) Ullevaal Stadion, Oslo
		Report	35' João Alves	Attendance: 9,875; Referee: (East Germany) Siegfried Kirschen

26 September 1979 Friendly	Spain	1–1	Portugal	(Spain) Balaídos, Vigo
	Dani 26' (pen.)	Report	51' (pen.) Nené	Attendance: 35,000; Referee: (Italy) Luigi Agnolin

17 October 1979 (Italy) 1980 EURO Q	Belgium	2–0	Portugal	(Belgium) Heysel Stadium, Brussels
	Wilfried Van Moer 46'; François Van der Elst 56'	Report		Attendance: 8,799; Referee: (Sweden) Ulf Eriksson

1 November 1979 (Italy) 1980 EURO Q	Portugal	3–1	Norway	(Portugal) Estádio Nacional, Lisbon
	Artur Correia 37'; Nené 59', 71'	Report	11' Georg Hammer	Attendance: 25,000; Referee: (Italy) Riccardo Lattanzi

21 November 1979 (Italy) 1980 EURO Q	Portugal	1–2	Austria	(Portugal) Estádio da Luz (1954), Lisbon
	Reinaldo Gomes 42'	Report	36' Kurt Welzl; 51' Walter Schachner	Attendance: 52,815; Referee: (Netherlands) Charles Corver
