= 1980 Supertaça de Portugal =

- Event: Supertaça de Portugal (Portuguese Super Cup)
Benfica	Sporting CP
4	3
- 4–3 on aggregate.

First leg
Benfica	Sporting CP
2	2
- Date: 10 September 1980
- Venue: Estádio José Alvalade, Lisbon
- Referee: Vítor Correia (Lisbon)

Second leg
Sporting CP	Benfica
1	2
- Date: 29 October 1980
- Venue: Estádio da Luz, Lisbon
- Referee: Nemésio de Castro (Lisbon)
- Attendance: 40,000

The 1980 Supertaça de Portugal was the 2nd edition of the Supertaça de Portugal, the annual Portuguese football season-opening match contested by the winners of the previous season's top league and cup competitions (or cup runner-up in case the league- and cup-winning club is the same). The 1980 Supertaça de Portugal was contested over two legs, and opposed Benfica and Sporting CP of the Primeira Liga. Sporting CP qualified for the SuperCup by winning the 1979–80 Primeira Divisão, whilst Benfica qualified for the Supertaça by winning the 1979–80 Taça de Portugal.

The first leg which took place at the Estádio José Alvalade, saw 2–2 draw. The second leg which took place at the Estádio da Luz, saw the Águias defeat the Leões 2–1 (4–3 on aggregate) to claim a first Supertaça.

== First leg ==
=== Details ===
10 September 1980

Sporting CP	2–2	Benfica
Jordão 59' (pen.), 67'		Carlos Manuel 10'; César 42'

Estádio José Alvalade, Lisbon
Referee: Vítor Correia (Lisbon)

Sporting CP	Benfica

GK	1	(Portugal) António Vaz
DF	(Portugal) Francisco Barão
DF	(Portugal) Eurico Gomes
DF	(Portugal) Augusto Inácio
DF	(Portugal) Zezinho
MF	(Portugal) Ademar Marques
MF	(Portugal) Lito
FW	(Brazil) Manoel Costa	(substituted off) 30'
FW	(Brazil) Salvador Almeida	(substituted off) 46'
FW	(Portugal) Rui Jordão
FW	(Portugal) Manuel Fernandes (c)
Substitutes:
FW	(Portugal) Carlos Freire	(substituted on) 30'
FW	(Brazil) Dilson Santos	(substituted on) 46'
Manager:
(Portugal) Fernando Mendes

GK	1	(Portugal) Manuel Bento (c)
DF	(Portugal) Humberto Coelho
DF	(Portugal) João Laranjeira
DF	(Portugal) Frederico Rosa
DF	(Portugal) António Bastos Lopes
MF	(Portugal) Shéu
MF	(Portugal) Carlos Manuel	Booked
MF	(Portugal) João Alves
MF	(Portugal) Fernando Chalana	Booked	(substituted off) 81'
FW	(Portugal) Nené
FW	(Brazil) César	(substituted off) 45'
Substitutes:
MF	(Portugal) José Luís	(substituted on) 81'
FW	(Portugal) Francisco Vital	(substituted on) 45'
Manager:
(Hungary) Lajos Baróti

Match officials

- Assistant referees:
  - António Beja (Lisbon)
  - João Vinagre (Lisbon)
- Fourth official:

Match rules

- 90 minutes.
- Maximum of three substitutions

== Second leg ==
=== Details ===
29 October 1980

Benfica	2–1	Sporting CP
Nené 43'; Vital 86'		Jordão 22' (pen.)

Estádio da Luz, Lisbon
Attendance: 40,000
Referee: Nemésio de Castro (Lisbon)

Benfica	Sporting CP

GK	1	(Portugal) António Botelho
DF	(Portugal) Carlos Alhinho
DF	(Portugal) António Bastos Lopes	(yellow card) 33'
DF	(Portugal) Frederico Rosa
DF	(Portugal) António Veloso
DF	(Portugal) Minervino Pietra
MF	(Portugal) Carlos Manuel
MF	(Portugal) João Alves	(substituted off) 72'
FW	(Brazil) César	(substituted off) 46'
FW	(Portugal) Nené (c)
FW	(Portugal) Francisco Vital
Substitutes:
MF	(Portugal) José Luís	(substituted on) 72'
MF	(Portugal) Joel Almeida	(substituted on) 46'
Manager:
(Hungary) Lajos Baróti

GK	1	(Portugal) António Fidalgo
DF	(Portugal) Eurico Gomes
DF	(Portugal) Augusto Inácio	(yellow card) 61'
DF	(Portugal) Francisco Barão	(yellow card) 40'	(substituted off) 74'
DF	(Portugal) Vitorino Bastos	(yellow card) 43'
MF	(Portugal) Ademar Marques
MF	(Portugal) Samuel Fraguito
FW	(Brazil) Manoel Costa	(yellow card) 33'
FW	(Portugal) Manuel Fernandes (c)
FW	(Portugal) Rui Jordão
FW	(Brazil) Salvador Almeida
Substitutes:
FW	(Portugal) Carlos Freire	(substituted on) 74'
Manager:
(Portugal) Fernando Mendes

1980 Supertaça de Portugal Winners
Benfica
1st Title

Match officials

- Assistant referees:
  - Fernando Vilas (Lisbon)
  - Joaquim Moreira (Lisbon)
- Fourth official:

Match rules

- 90 minutes.
- Maximum of three substitutions

== See also ==
- Derby de Lisboa
- 1980–81 S.L. Benfica season
- 1980–81 Primeira Divisão
