= 1980 Taça de Portugal final =

- Event: 1979–80 Taça de Portugal
Benfica	Porto
1	0
- Date: 7 June 1980
- Venue: Estádio Nacional, Oeiras
- Referee: César Correia (Algarve)

The 1980 Taça de Portugal final was the final match of the 1979–80 Taça de Portugal, the 40th season of the Taça de Portugal, the premier Portuguese football cup competition organized by the Portuguese Football Federation (FPF). The match was played on 7 June 1980 at the Estádio Nacional in Oeiras, and opposed two Primeira Liga sides: Benfica and Porto. Benfica defeated Porto 1–0 to claim the Taça de Portugal for a sixteenth time.

In Portugal, the final was televised live on RTP. As a result of Benfica winning the Taça de Portugal, the Águias qualified for the 1980 Supertaça Cândido de Oliveira where they took on 1979–80 Primeira Divisão winners Sporting CP.

== Match ==
=== Details ===
7 June 1980

Benfica	1–0	Porto
Nené 36'

Estádio Nacional, Oeiras
Referee: César Correia (Algarve)

Benfica	Porto

GK	1	(Portugal) Manuel Bento
DF	(Portugal) Alberto Fonseca	(substituted off) 10'
DF	(Portugal) João Laranjeira
DF	(Portugal) António Bastos Lopes	(substituted off) 70'
DF	(Portugal) Humberto Coelho
DF	(Portugal) Minervino Pietra
MF	(Portugal) Toni
MF	(Portugal) Shéu
MF	(Portugal) Carlos Manuel
FW	(Portugal) Nené (c)
FW	(Brazil) César
Substitutes:
MF	(Portugal) Frederico Rosa	(substituted on) 10'
FW	(Portugal) Reinaldo Gomes	(substituted on) 70'
Manager:
(Portugal) Mário Wilson

GK	1	(Portugal) João Fonseca
DF	(Portugal) Fernando Freitas
DF	(Portugal) António Lima Pereira
DF	(Portugal) Carlos Simões (c)
MF	(Portugal) Romeu Silva
MF	(Portugal) Rodolfo Reis	(substituted off) 46'
MF	(Portugal) Quinito	(substituted off) 65'
MF	(Portugal) António Frasco
MF	(Portugal) António Sousa
MF	(Portugal) Adelino Teixeira
FW	(Portugal) Fernando Gomes
Substitutes:
MF	(Portugal) Albertino Pereira	(substituted on) 46'
FW	(Brazil) Bife	(substituted on) 65'
Manager:
(Portugal) José Maria Pedroto

1979–80 Taça de Portugal Winners
Benfica
16th Title

Match officials

- Assistant referees:
- Fourth official:

Match rules

- 90 minutes.
- 30 minutes of extra time if necessary.
- Maximum of two substitutions

== See also ==
- O Clássico
- 1979–80 S.L. Benfica season
