= Alberto Bastos Lopes =

Portuguese football manager and former player

Personal information
- Full name: Alberto Carlos Bastos Lopes
- Date of birth: 22 October 1959 (age 67)
- Place of birth: Lisbon, Portugal
- Height: 1.86 m (6 ft 1 in)
- Positions: Centre back; defensive midfielder

Youth career
- 1973–1978: Benfica

Senior career*
Years	Team	Apps	(Gls)
1978–1985	Benfica	26	(1)
1979–1980	→ Estoril (loan)	29	(2)
1984–1985	→ Belenenses (loan)	21	(1)
1985–1986	Penafiel	25	(0)
1986–1988	Braga	29	(3)
1988–1989	Fafe	0	(0)
Total		130	(7)

International career
1977–1978	Portugal U18	13	(1)
1979	Portugal U20	6	(0)
1979–1983	Portugal U21	15	(3)

Managerial career
- 1991–1995: Odivelas
- 1995–1997: Atlético Malveira
- 1997–1998: Vilafranquense
- 1998–2000: Sintrense
- 2000–2001: Atlético
- 2001–2002: Beneditense
- 2003–2004: Benfica (youth)
- 2004–2006: Sintrense
- 2007–2009: Peniche
- 2009–2012: 1º Dezembro
- 2013–2014: Lourinhanense
- 2016: Atlético Malveira
- * Club domestic league appearances and goals

Alberto Carlos Bastos Lopes (born 22 October 1959) is a Portuguese former footballer who played mainly as a central defender but also as a defensive midfielder, and is a manager.

Over ten seasons, he amassed Primeira Liga totals of 130 matches and seven goals.

== Club career ==
Born in Lisbon, Bastos Lopes progressed through S.L. Benfica's youth system, arriving in the first team after a loan spell at neighbouring G.D. Estoril Praia. However, due to stiff competition from Humberto Coelho and António Oliveira in defense and Shéu and Glenn Strömberg in midfield, he appeared only as a substitute on most occasions; additionally, he was loaned to G.D. Estoril-Praia for the 1979–80 season, and to C.F. Os Belenenses for 1984–85.

After leaving in the summer of 1985, Bastos Lopes continued competing always in the Primeira Liga in the following campaigns, with F.C. Penafiel and S.C. Braga. He nearly signed for Deportivo de La Coruña in 1988, but did not pass his medical.

Bastos Lopes retired in 1989, at the age of only 29. He subsequently started a lengthy managerial career, never in higher than the third division. In 2004, he led Benfica's juniors to the national championship.

== International career ==
Bastos Lopes represented Portugal at the 1979 FIFA World Youth Championship, helping the nation to the quarter-finals.

== Personal life ==
Bastos Lopes' older brother, António, was also a footballer and a defender. He too represented Benfica, with more success.

== Honours ==
Benfica

- Primeira Liga (7): 1980–81, 1982–83, 1983–84
- Taça de Portugal (5): 1980–81, 1982–83
- Supertaça Cândido de Oliveira (2); Runner-up 1981
- Taça de Honra (7)
- UEFA Cup: Runner-up 1983–84
