= 1979–80 Primeira Divisão =

46th season of top-tier Portuguese football

Primeira Liga
- Season: 1979–80
- Champions: Sporting CP; 15th title
- Relegated: União de Leiria; Estoril; Beira-Mar; Rio Ave
- European Cup: Sporting CP
- Cup Winners' Cup: S.L. Benfica
- UEFA Cup: Porto; Boavista
- Matches: 240
- Goals: 600 (2.5 per match)
- Top goalscorer: Rui Jordão (31 goals)

Statistics of Portuguese Liga in the 1979–80 season.

== Overview ==
It was contested by 16 teams, and Sporting Clube de Portugal won the championship.

== League standings ==
Pos	Team	Pld	W	D	L	GF	GA	GD	Pts	Qualification or relegation
1	Sporting CP (C)	30	24	4	2	67	17	+50	52	Qualification to European Cup first round
2	Porto	30	22	6	2	59	9	+50	50	Qualification to UEFA Cup first round
3	Benfica	30	19	7	4	79	21	+58	45	Qualification to Cup Winners' Cup preliminary round (Note: Benfica qualified for the Cup Winners' Cup as winners of the 1980 Taça de Portugal Final.)
4	Boavista	30	15	7	8	44	30	+14	37	Qualification to UEFA Cup first round
5	Belenenses	30	13	8	9	33	38	−5	34	
6	Vitória de Guimarães	30	11	10	9	42	38	+4	32	
7	Espinho	30	11	6	13	29	42	−13	28	
8	Portimonense	30	10	6	14	32	49	−17	26	
9	Braga	30	10	6	14	34	40	−6	26	
10	Varzim	30	8	10	12	37	45	−8	26	
11	Marítimo	30	9	8	13	25	37	−12	26	
12	Vitória de Setúbal	30	9	5	16	29	41	−12	23	
13	União de Leiria (R)	30	6	9	15	26	49	−23	21	Relegation to Segunda Divisão
14	Estoril (R)	30	5	11	14	18	37	−19	21	Relegation to Segunda Divisão
15	Beira-Mar (R)	30	5	10	15	24	46	−22	20	Relegation to Segunda Divisão
16	Rio Ave (R)	30	5	3	22	22	61	−39	13	Relegation to Segunda Divisão

Source: RSSSF
(C) Champions; (R) Relegated

== Results ==
Home \ Away	BEM	BEL	BEN	BOA	BRA	ESP	EST	MAR	PTM	POR	RAV	SCP	ULE	VAR	VGU	VSE
Beira-Mar		1–1	0–3	1–0	0–2	1–1	3–1	2–3	1–1	0–4	2–0	0–1	1–1	2–2	3–3	0–0
Belenenses	1–0		0–3	1–0	2–0	2–0	1–2	1–0	1–1	0–1	1–0	2–1	2–1	5–1	1–4	2–1
Benfica	5–0	8–0		1–2	3–1	4–3	4–1	4–0	1–0	0–0	8–0	3–2	3–0	4–0	4–0	5–1
Boavista	1–1	2–1	1–1		1–0	4–0	1–0	2–1	5–1	0–1	1–0	2–2	3–0	1–1	0–0	5–1
Braga	1–0	1–1	1–1	2–0		2–1	0–0	1–0	0–0	0–2	2–3	2–3	0–0	3–1	2–1	3–1
Espinho	2–1	1–1	0–3	0–2	2–1		2–1	1–0	2–1	2–0	1–0	0–1	2–1	2–0	2–1	0–1
Estoril	3–1	1–1	0–2	0–0	0–1	1–1		0–0	1–0	0–0	2–0	0–1	0–1	0–0	1–1	0–0
Marítimo	1–0	0–0	1–1	1–1	0–0	0–0	3–1		1–0	0–1	1–0	0–3	5–0	1–0	1–1	2–0
Portimonense	1–0	1–2	0–2	2–0	3–1	1–1	4–0	3–1		0–4	2–1	0–0	1–1	1–0	4–5	1–0
Porto	3–0	3–0	2–1	2–0	1–0	3–0	3–0	2–0	6–0		1–1	1–1	1–0	2–1	4–0	3–1
Rio Ave	1–2	1–2	0–3	1–2	1–0	0–2	0–2	4–0	0–2	1–3		1–3	0–0	3–2	1–1	2–1
Sporting CP	2–0	2–0	3–1	4–1	2–1	4–0	2–0	4–1	2–0	1–0	5–0		3–0	3–0	2–0	4–1
União de Leiria	1–1	0–0	1–1	3–1	2–4	2–1	1–1	1–0	0–1	0–4	2–0	1–2		2–0	1–4	1–1
Varzim	1–0	1–1	2–0	1–2	3–2	0–0	0–0	3–0	5–1	0–0	3–0	0–0	4–2		1–1	3–1
Vitória de Guimarães	0–1	1–0	0–0	1–3	3–0	1–0	3–0	1–1	2–0	0–0	3–1	0–1	2–1	2–2		1–0
Vitória de Setúbal	0–0	0–1	0–0	0–1	3–1	3–0	1–0	0–1	4–0	0–2	2–0	0–3	1–0	4–0	1–0	

Legend: Blue = home team win; Yellow = draw; Red = away team win.

== Season statistics ==
=== Top goalscorers ===
Rank	Player	Club	Goals
1	(Portugal) Rui Jordão	Sporting	31
2	(Portugal) Nené	Benfica	30
3	(Portugal) Fernando Gomes	Porto	23
4	(Brazil) Mundinho	Vitória de Guimarães	16
5	(Portugal) Reinaldo	Benfica	15
6	(Portugal) Júlio	Boavista	12
6	(Brazil) Manoel	Sporting	12
8	(Brazil) Mirobaldo	Portimonense	11
9	(Portugal) Chico Faria	Braga	10
9	(Portugal) Manuel Fernandes	Sporting	10
