= Fernando Chalana =

Portuguese footballer and manager (1959–2022)

Personal information
- Full name: Fernando Albino de Sousa Chalana
- Date of birth: 10 February 1959
- Place of birth: Barreiro, Portugal
- Date of death: 10 August 2022 (aged 63)
- Place of death: Lisbon, Portugal
- Height: 1.65 m (5 ft 5 in)
- Position: Winger

Youth career
- 1973–1974: Barreirense
- 1974–1976: Benfica

Senior career*
Years	Team	Apps	(Gls)
1976–1984	Benfica	193	(33)
1984–1987	Bordeaux	22	(2)
1987–1990	Benfica	32	(4)
1990–1991	Belenenses	14	(0)
1991–1992	Estrela Amadora	9	(1)
Total		270	(40)

International career
1976–1988	Portugal	27	(2)

Managerial career
- 2002: Benfica (caretaker)
- 2003–2004: Paços Ferreira (assistant)
- 2004–2005: Oriental
- 2005–2009: Benfica (assistant)
- 2008: Benfica (caretaker)
Medal record
Men's football
Representing Portugal
UEFA European Championship
Bronze medal – third place	1984 France
- * Club domestic league appearances and goals

Fernando Albino de Sousa Chalana (Portuguese pronunciation: [fɨɾˈnɐ̃du ʃɐˈlɐnɐ]; 10 February 1959 – 10 August 2022) was a Portuguese football player and manager.

The left winger's main asset was his ball control and dribbling skills.

His career, highly troubled by injuries, was mainly spent at Benfica, where he also later worked as a manager. Prior to his physical problems, he helped Portugal reach the semi-finals at Euro 1984.

== Playing career ==
Born in Barreiro, Setúbal District, Chalana began his football career at Barreirense, then moved to Lisbon neighbours Benfica in 1974, where he established himself the following eight years, scoring and assisting alike as he helped them conquer, amongst other accolades, five Primeira Liga and three Taça de Portugal trophies.

Aged only 17 (fourth youngest ever), on 17 November 1976, Chalana won his first cap for Portugal, against Denmark for the 1978 FIFA World Cup qualifiers – at that age, he became Benfica's youngest player to score a goal at the Estádio da Luz. The peak of his career took place precisely on the international front, at UEFA Euro 1984, in France. There, the Little Genius was one of the team's leading figures, excelling in dribbling throughout the tournament, notably in the 3–2 semi-final loss against the hosts, setting up both goals for Rui Jordão.

Moving to a club in that country after the tournament, Bordeaux, Chalana failed to impress over three full seasons, mainly due to persistent injuries. In 1987, he returned to Benfica, never being able to reproduce his previous form; his last international appearance was a friendly with Sweden on 12 November 1988, which finished with a goalless draw.

Chalana wrapped his career at 33, with one season apiece with Lisbon-based sides Belenenses and Estrela da Amadora, the latter in the second division.

== Coaching career ==
In 1999–2000, Chalana was at the helm of Benfica's juniors, winning the national championship. He had his first senior coaching experience four years later, assisting at modest Paços de Ferreira in a top-flight relegation as 17th.

The following years, Chalana served as assistant to several managers at Benfica. However, in March 2008 he replaced José Antonio Camacho after the Spaniard was dismissed. In 2002, he had already had a one-game spell as interim, filling in for the dismissed Jesualdo Ferreira – days before precisely Camacho arrived; in that match he placed winger Miguel as a right-back, where he ultimately gained worldwide recognition.

After one more season as assistant, now to Quique Sánchez Flores, Chalana returned to the junior side.

== Personal life and death ==
Other than his main nickname, Chalana was also dubbed Chalanix (as his moustache resembled that of comic character Asterix).

He died on 10 August 2022 at the age of 63, due to degenerative disease.

== Career statistics ==
Scores and results list Portugal's goal tally first, score column indicates score after each Chalana goal.

List of international goals scored by Fernando Chalana
No.	Date	Venue	Opponent	Score	Result	Competition
1	5 December 1976	Tsirion Stadium, Limassol, Cyprus	Cyprus	1–0	2–1	1978 World Cup qualification
2	16 November 1977	Estádio de São Luís, Faro, Portugal	Cyprus	2–0	4–0	1978 World Cup qualification

== Honours ==
Benfica

- Primeira Divisão: 1975–76, 1976–77, 1980–81, 1982–83, 1983–84, 1988–89
- Taça de Portugal: 1979–80, 1980–81, 1982–83
- Supertaça Cândido de Oliveira: 1980, 1989
- Taça de Honra (3)

Bordeaux

- Ligue 1: 1984–85, 1986–87
- Coupe de France: 1985–86, 1986–87
- Trophée des champions: 1986

Individual

- Portuguese Footballer of the Year: 1976, 1984
- UEFA European Championship Team of the Tournament: 1984
