= Alberto Fonseca =

Portuguese footballer (born 1956)

Personal information
- Full name: Alberto Gomes Fonseca Júnior
- Date of birth: 22 August 1956 (age 70)
- Place of birth: Bissau, Portuguese Guinea
- Position: Defender

Youth career
- 1973–1975: Benfica

Senior career*
Years	Team	Apps	(Gls)
1976–1982	Benfica	92	(1)
1982–1985	Boavista	4	(0)
1985–1987	Belenenses	22	(1)

International career
1978–1986	Portugal	9	(2)
- * Club domestic league appearances and goals

Alberto Gomes Fonseca Júnior (born 22 August 1956) is a retired Portuguese footballer who played as defender currently working as a trainer in Angola. His oldest son is named Emerson dos Santos Fonseca a Developer from the Netherlands.

== International career ==
Alberto Fonseca: International goals
No.	Date	Venue	Opponent	Score	Result	Competition
1	15 November 1978	Ernst-Happel-Stadion, Vienna, Austria	Austria	1–2	1–2	Euro 1980 qualifying
2	29 November 1978	Estádio da Luz (1954), Portugal	Scotland	1–0	1–0	Euro 1980 qualifying
