= Nené (footballer, born 1949) =

Portuguese footballer (born 1949)

Personal information
- Full name: Tamagnini Manuel Gomes Batista
- Date of birth: 20 November 1949 (age 76)
- Place of birth: Leça da Palmeira, Portugal
- Height: 1.72 m (5 ft 8 in)
- Position: Striker

Youth career
- Ferroviário Manga
- 1966–1968: Benfica

Senior career*
Years	Team	Apps	(Gls)
1968–1986	Benfica	421	(262)

International career
1971–1984	Portugal	66	(22)
Medal record
Men's football
Representing Portugal
UEFA European Championship
Bronze medal – third place	1984 France
- * Club domestic league appearances and goals

Tamagnini Manuel Gomes Batista (born 20 November 1949), known as Nené (Portuguese pronunciation: [nɛˈnɛ]), is a retired Portuguese professional footballer. A prolific striker, he played his entire career with Benfica, appearing in nearly 600 official games for the club and winning 19 titles, a record for several years.

Playing 66 times for Portugal and scoring 22 goals, Nené represented the nation at Euro 1984.

== Club career ==
Born in Leça da Palmeira, Nené made his professional debuts with S.L. Benfica in 1968 and remained a key fixture with the club until his retirement almost twenty years later, at nearly 37. In the 1972–73 season, he was a star player for a side which became Primeira Liga champion without a single defeat (28 matches won – 23 consecutively – out of 30): the team scored 101 goals, breaking 100 for only the second time in its history.

Nené was the Portuguese Footballer of the Year in 1971 and also runner-up in 1972, which was achieved whilst competing with teammate Eusébio. He ranked second in Benfica's scoring lists in European competitions with 28 goals in 75 appearances, and played in the 1982–83 UEFA Cup finals, in an aggregate loss to R.S.C. Anderlecht.

As a player, Nené won 11 national championships with his only club. After ending his career, with overall totals of 577 games and 361 goals, he became a youth coach at the Estádio da Luz.

== International career ==
Nené earned 66 caps for Portugal, ranking joint-ninth (with Simão Sabrosa) in the goalscoring charts at 22. He was their record appearance maker until 1994, when it was broken by FC Porto's João Domingos Pinto.

Nené made his debut on 21 April 1971, in a 2–0 home win against Scotland for the UEFA Euro 1972 qualifiers. He played for the 1972 Brazil Independence Cup, where Portugal reached the final, losing 0-1 to Brazil, in a competition where he scored two goals. Selected for the Euro 1984 tournament, he netted the game's only goal against Romania in the last group stage encounter, becoming the oldest player to score in the European championship finals at 34 years and 213 days; his effort led the national team to the semi-finals versus hosts France, where he played as a substitute but could not help avoid the 2–3 extra time defeat.

Nené's record was only broken 24 years later, when Ivica Vastić scored for Austria at Euro 2008 against Poland.

=== International goals ===
Nené: International goals
No.	Date	Venue	Opponent	Score	Result	Competition
1	29 March 1972	Estádio da Luz (1954), Lisbon, Portugal	Cyprus	2–0	4–0	1974 World Cup qualification
2	11 June 1972	Machadão, Natal, Brazil	Ecuador	0–3	0–3	Brazil Independence Cup
3	25 June 1972	Estádio do Arruda, Recife, Brazil	Republic of Ireland	2–0	2–1	Brazil Independence Cup
4	2 May 1973	Vasil Levski National Stadium, Sofia, Bulgaria	Bulgaria	2–1	2–1	1974 World Cup qualification
5	26 May 1975	Stade Olympique Yves-du-Manoir, Colombes, France	France	0–1	0–2	Friendly
6	8 June 1975	Tsirion Stadium, Limassol, Cyprus	Cyprus	0–1	0–2	Euro 1976 qualifying
7	12 November 1975	Estádio das Antas, Porto, Portugal	Czechoslovakia	1–1	1–1	Euro 1976 qualifying
8	5 December 1976	Tsirion Stadium, Limassol, Cyprus	Cyprus	1–2	1–2	1978 World Cup qualification
9	22 December 1976	Estádio José Alvalade (1956), Lisbon, Portugal	Italy	1–0	2–1	Friendly
10	22 December 1976	Estádio José Alvalade (1956), Lisbon, Portugal	Italy	2–0	2–1	Friendly
11	9 October 1977	Idrætsparken, Copenhagen, Denmark	Denmark	0–2	2–4	1978 World Cup qualification
12	15 November 1978	Ernst-Happel-Stadion, Vienna, Austria	Austria	0–1	1–2	Euro 1980 qualifying
13	26 September 1979	Balaídos, Vigo, Spain	Spain	1–1	1–1	Friendly
14	1 November 1979	Estádio Nacional, Lisbon, Portugal	Norway	2–1	3–1	Euro 1980 qualifying
15	1 November 1979	Estádio Nacional, Lisbon, Portugal	Norway	3–1	3–1	Euro 1980 qualifying
16	20 June 1981	Estádio das Antas, Porto, Portugal	Spain	1–0	2–0	Friendly
17	23 September 1981	Estádio José Alvalade (1956), Lisbon, Portugal	Poland	1–0	2–0	Friendly
18	24 March 1982	Cornaredo Stadium, Lugano, Switzerland	Switzerland	0–1	2–1	Friendly
19	5 May 1982	Castelão (Maranhão), São Luís, Maranhão, Brazil	Brazil	3–1	3–1	Friendly
20	22 September 1982	Helsinki Olympic Stadium, Helsinki, Finland	Finland	0–1	0–2	Euro 1984 qualifying
21	10 October 1982	Estádio da Luz (1954), Lisbon, Portugal	Poland	1–0	2–1	Euro 1984 qualifying
22	20 June 1984	Stade de la Beaujoire, Nantes, France	Romania	1–0	1–0	UEFA Euro 1984

== Honours ==
=== Club ===
Benfica

- Primeira Divisão (10): 1968–69, 1970–71, 1971–72, 1972–73, 1974–75, 1975–76, 1976–77, 1980–81, 1982–83, 1983–84
- Taça de Portugal (7): 1969–70, 1971–72, 1979–80, 1980–81, 1982–83, 1984–85, 1985–86
- Supertaça Cândido de Oliveira: 1980, 1985
- Taça de Honra Lisbon FA (8)

=== Individual ===
- Portuguese League: Top Scorer 1980–81, 1983–84
- Portuguese Footballer of the Year: 1971

== See also ==
- List of one-club men
