= César (footballer, born 1956) =

Brazilian footballer (1956–2024)

Personal information
- Full name: César Martins de Oliveira
- Date of birth: April 13, 1956
- Place of birth: São João da Barra, Rio de Janeiro, Brazil
- Date of death: September 17, 2024 (aged 68)
- Position: Forward

Senior career*
Years	Team	Apps	(Gls)
1976–1979	América	71	(22)
1979–1983	Benfica	54	(19)
1983–1984	Grêmio	13	(3)
1985	Palmeiras	0	(0)
1986	São Bento		
1987	Pelotas		
Total		138	(44)
- * Club domestic league appearances and goals

César Martins de Oliveira (April 13, 1956 – September 17, 2024), simply known as César, was a Brazilian football forward, who played in several Série A clubs. He was the top goalscorer of the Série A 1979.

== Biography ==
César was born in São João da Barra, state of Rio de Janeiro on April 13, 1956. He defended América of his native city from 1976 to 1979, scoring Série A 22 goals in 71 games, and finishing as the Série A 1979 top goalscorer with 12 goals, tied with Cruzeiro's Roberto César. He played for Grêmio in 1983 and in 1984, scoring three goals in 13 Série A games. Defending Grêmio, he won the Copa Libertadores in 1983, and that season's Intercontinental Cup. He scored Grêmio's winning goal against Peñarol in the second leg of the Copa Libertadores final, played at Estádio Olímpico Monumental. Besides América and Grêmio, César has also played for Benfica of Portugal, Palmeiras, São Bento and Pelotas. César died on September 17, 2024, at the age of 68.

== Honors ==
Grêmio

- Copa Libertadores: 1983
- Intercontinental Cup: 1983

Benfica

- Portuguese League: 1980–81, 1982–83
- Portuguese Cup: 1979–80, 1980–81, 1982–83
- Supertaça Cândido de Oliveira: 1980
