= António Bastos Lopes =

Portuguese footballer (born 1953)

Personal information
- Full name: António José Bastos Lopes
- Date of birth: 19 December 1953 (age 72)
- Place of birth: Lisbon, Portugal
- Height: 1.86 m (6 ft 1 in)
- Position: Centre back

Youth career
- Benfica

Senior career*
Years	Team	Apps	(Gls)
1972–1987	Benfica	274	(3)

International career
1979–1985	Portugal	10	(0)
Medal record
Men's football
Representing Portugal
UEFA European Championship
Bronze medal – third place	1984 France
- * Club domestic league appearances and goals

António José Bastos Lopes (born 19 December 1953) is a Portuguese retired footballer who played as a central defender.

== Club career ==
Born in Lisbon, Bastos Lopes played for 15 seasons with hometown side S.L. Benfica, making his first-team debut in 1972. After only seven Primeira Liga games in his first three years combined, he benefitted from the departure of legendary Humberto Coelho – who barred him at the stopper position – to Paris Saint-Germain F.C. to begin appearing more regularly.

For nine of the following 12 years, Lopes started more often than not, even when Coelho returned from France two years later, and went on to win seven leagues, six cups and two supercups with his only club. He also appeared in both legs of the 1982–83 UEFA Cup final, lost against R.S.C. Anderlecht on aggregate (1–2), starting in the second leg in Lisbon (1–1 draw).

After no appearances whatsoever in the 1986–87 campaign, aged nearly 34, Lopes retired from football, amassing league totals of 274 matches and three goals for Benfica. In 2010–11, he was part of Jorge Jesus' coaching staff.

== International career ==
Bastos Lopes made his debut for Portugal on 9 May 1979, playing the last minute in a 1–0 win in Norway for the UEFA Euro 1980 qualifiers. He went on to earn ten caps in six years, being selected to the squad that appeared at Euro 1984 but being an unused member for the eventual semi-finalists.

== Personal life ==
Bastos Lopes' younger brother, Alberto, was also a footballer and a defender. He too represented Benfica.

== Honours ==
Benfica

- Primeira Liga: 1972–73, 1974–75, 1975–76, 1976–77, 1980–81, 1982–83, 1983–84

== See also ==
- List of one-club men
