= Humberto Coelho =

Portuguese retired footballer and manager

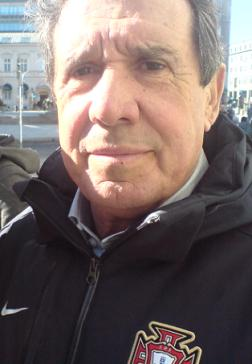
- Coelho in 2012

Personal information
- Full name: Humberto Manuel de Jesus Coelho
- Date of birth: 20 April 1950 (age 76)
- Place of birth: Cedofeita, Portugal
- Height: 1.85 m (6 ft 1 in)
- Position: Centre back

Youth career
- 1964–1966: Ramaldense
- 1966–1968: Benfica

Senior career*
Years	Team	Apps	(Gls)
1968–1975	Benfica	188	(24)
1975–1977	Paris Saint-Germain	42	(7)
1977	Las Vegas Quicksilvers	22	(3)
1977–1984	Benfica	167	(32)
Total		419	(66)

International career
1967–1968	Portugal U18	7	(0)
1968	Portugal U21	1	(0)
1968–1983	Portugal	64	(6)

Managerial career
- 1985–1986: Salgueiros
- 1986–1987: Braga
- 1997–2000: Portugal
- 2000–2002: Morocco
- 2003–2004: South Korea
- 2005–2006: Al Shabab
- 2008–2009: Tunisia
Medal record
Men's football
Representing Portugal (manager)
UEFA European Championship
Bronze medal – third place	2000 Belgium-Netherlands
- * Club domestic league appearances and goals

Humberto Manuel de Jesus Coelho (born 20 April 1950) is a Portuguese retired footballer and manager.

In a career mainly associated with Benfica, the central defender also competed professionally in France and the United States, during a 16-year career. He won more than 60 caps for Portugal, being the player with the most appearances for several years.

Coelho worked as a manager since 1985, also being in charge of several national teams, including his own.

== Playing career ==
Born in Cedofeita, Porto, Coelho was regarded as one of the best stoppers in Portuguese football, imposing himself in Lisbon-based Benfica's first team at the age of 18 – four years later, he had already played in 101 Primeira Liga matches for the club. On 27 October 1968 he made his debut for Portugal, in a 3–0 win over Romania for the 1970 FIFA World Cup qualifying stages; during the next 15 years he would appear in a further 63 internationals, scoring six goals while acting as captain on 30 occasions.

From 1975 during two seasons, Coelho played abroad with Paris Saint-Germain. He continued to display the traditional attacking penchant in spite of his position as he netted six times in his first year, although the side could only finish in 14th position in Ligue 1.

Subsequently, Coelho returned to Benfica, helping to the conquest of a further three leagues and four domestic cups. He last appeared for the national team at the age of 33, during the 0–5 defeat in the Soviet Union for the UEFA Euro 1984 qualifiers – Portugal would qualify for the final stages in France, but he was severely injured during that period and retired shortly after, having appeared for his main club in 496 competitive matches (355 in the league alone) and scoring 76 goals.

Humberto Coelho: International goals
No.	Date	Venue	Opponent	Score	Result	Competition
1	10 May 1970	Estádio Nacional, Lisbon, Portugal	Italy	1–2	1–2	Friendly
2	29 March 1972	Estádio da Luz (1954), Lisbon, Portugal	Cyprus	1–0	4–0	1974 World Cup qualification
3	14 June 1972	Estádio do Arruda, Recife, Brazil	Iran	0–3	0–3	Brazilian Independence Cup
4	18 June 1972	Estádio do Arruda, Recife, Brazil	Chile	0–1	1–4	Brazilian Independence Cup
5	17 December 1980	Estádio da Luz (1954), Lisbon, Portugal	Israel	1–0	3–0	1982 World Cup qualification
6	17 December 1980	Estádio da Luz (1954), Lisbon, Portugal	Israel	3–0	3–0	1982 World Cup qualification

== Coaching career ==
More than one decade after starting as a coach, with spells with Salgueiros and Braga, both in the top level, Coelho led Portugal to the semi-finals of Euro 2000. However, his contract was not renewed, and late into that same year he was appointed manager of Morocco, being released after the Atlas Lions failed to qualify for the 2002 World Cup.

After a spell with South Korea, which ended after roughly one year after a surprise loss to Vietnam, Coelho joined another one in 2008, Tunisia, after a brief return to club action in Saudi Arabia. On 18 November 2009, he was fired following a 0–1 loss in Mozambique for the 2010 World Cup qualification, which ended the country's streak of three consecutive presences in the tournament.

Subsequently, Coelho acted as a director in the Portuguese Football Federation.

== Personal life ==
Coelho met his future wife, Laurence, shortly after moving to Paris in 1975. She worked as a freelance reporter for RTL, and the couple became parents to two daughters, born in 1980 and 1986.

== Honours ==
=== Player ===
==== Club ====
Benfica

- Primeira Liga: 1968–69, 1970–71, 1971–72, 1972–73, 1974–75, 1980–81, 1982–83, 1983–84
- Taça de Portugal (6)
- Supertaça Cândido de Oliveira: 1980

==== International ====
Portugal

- Brazilian Independence Cup runner-up: 1972

==== Individual ====
- Portuguese Footballer of the Year: 1974

=== Manager ===
South Korea

- EAFF E-1 Football Championship: 2003
