= 1980–81 Primeira Divisão =

47th season of top-tier Portuguese football

Primeira Liga
- Season: 1980–81
- Champions: Benfica; 24th title
- Relegated: Varzim; Marítimo; Académica
- European Cup: Benfica
- Cup Winners' Cup: Porto
- UEFA Cup: Sporting CP; Boavista
- Matches: 240
- Goals: 560 (2.33 per match)
- Top goalscorer: Nené (20 goals)

The 1980–81 Primeira Divisão was the 47th season of top-tier football in Portugal.

== Overview ==
It was contested by 16 teams, and S.L. Benfica won the championship.

== League standings ==
Pos	Team	Pld	W	D	L	GF	GA	GD	Pts	Qualification or relegation
1	Benfica (C)	30	22	6	2	72	15	+57	50	Qualification to European Cup first round
2	Porto	30	21	6	3	53	18	+35	48	Qualification to Cup Winners' Cup first round (Note: Porto qualified for the Cup Winners' Cup as the other finalist, Benfica, had qualified for the European Cup.)
3	Sporting CP	30	14	9	7	48	28	+20	37	Qualification to UEFA Cup first round
4	Boavista	30	14	8	8	36	25	+11	36	Qualification to UEFA Cup first round
5	Vitória de Guimarães	30	11	9	10	38	30	+8	31	
6	Braga	30	10	10	10	34	39	−5	30	
7	Vitória de Setúbal	30	9	11	10	30	30	0	29	
8	Portimonense	30	11	6	13	34	37	−3	28	
9	Espinho	30	9	9	12	26	35	−9	27	
10	Penafiel	30	11	5	14	27	38	−11	27	
11	Belenenses	30	8	10	12	24	39	−15	26	
12	Amora	30	10	5	15	38	51	−13	25	
13	Académico de Viseu	30	8	9	13	24	40	−16	25	
14	Varzim (R)	30	8	8	14	27	31	−4	24	Relegation to Segunda Divisão
15	Marítimo (R)	30	7	9	14	33	46	−13	23	Relegation to Segunda Divisão
16	Académica (R)	30	4	6	20	16	58	−42	14	Relegation to Segunda Divisão

Source: RSSSF
(C) Champions; (R) Relegated

== Results ==
Home \ Away	ACA	ACV	AMO	BEL	BEN	BOA	BRA	ESP	MAR	PEN	PTM	POR	SCP	VAR	VGU	VSE
Académica		0–2	1–1	0–2	0–2	0–0	1–2	3–1	1–0	2–0	1–0	0–0	1–2	0–1	1–2	1–1
Académico de Viseu	2–1		1–0	1–2	1–1	0–0	0–0	0–0	1–1	2–0	1–1	1–2	1–1	1–0	2–1	1–0
Amora	6–0	2–0		2–1	0–2	1–3	0–0	0–0	1–0	3–1	2–0	1–3	3–0	1–0	2–1	0–1
Belenenses	0–0	0–0	1–2		0–3	0–0	2–2	1–0	1–1	3–1	2–0	0–1	1–1	1–1	1–0	2–1
Benfica	4–0	3–0	4–1	4–1		3–0	3–1	2–1	6–1	6–0	2–0	1–0	1–1	1–0	2–0	5–1
Boavista	4–0	1–0	2–1	2–0	0–1		1–1	0–0	3–0	2–0	3–0	0–1	2–1	1–0	2–1	3–1
Braga	1–0	1–0	4–1	0–0	0–3	1–0		0–1	4–2	3–1	4–2	0–3	2–2	0–0	3–0	2–1
Espinho	1–1	0–0	4–1	1–0	2–0	1–0	1–1		0–0	1–0	1–0	0–1	3–2	0–0	3–1	0–1
Marítimo	3–1	5–3	3–1	0–0	1–2	0–2	1–0	2–1		2–1	1–1	0–1	0–1	1–1	2–2	0–0
Penafiel	2–1	2–1	2–0	1–0	0–0	3–0	2–0	1–0	1–0		3–0	0–0	0–2	0–0	0–2	2–1
Portimonense	4–0	3–1	1–1	1–2	1–5	5–1	2–0	1–1	2–0	2–0		1–0	1–0	3–0	0–0	0–1
Porto	7–0	2–0	6–3	3–1	2–1	2–1	1–0	2–1	1–1	2–2	3–0		1–0	1–1	1–0	3–0
Sporting CP	3–0	0–1	5–0	3–0	1–1	1–1	1–1	4–1	3–1	1–0	2–0	1–2		1–0	2–0	1–0
Varzim	2–0	3–1	2–0	4–0	0–4	0–1	2–0	5–1	3–2	0–1	0–2	1–2	1–3		0–1	0–0
Vitória de Guimarães	1–0	2–0	2–1	4–0	0–0	1–1	5–0	3–0	2–0	2–1	0–0	0–0	2–2	0–0		1–1
Vitória de Setúbal	2–0	6–0	1–1	0–0	0–0	0–0	1–1	3–0	0–3	0–0	0–1	1–0	1–1	2–0	3–2	

Legend: Blue = home team win; Yellow = draw; Red = away team win.

== Season statistics ==
=== Top goalscorers ===
Rank	Player	Club	Goals
1	(Portugal) Nené	Benfica	20
2	(Portugal) Jacques	Braga	17
3	(Republic of Ireland) Mickey Walsh	Porto	14
3	(Portugal) Jorge Silva	Amora	14
3	(Portugal) Rui Jordão	Sporting	14
3	(Portugal) João Alves	Benfica	14
7	(Portugal) Júlio Carlos	Boavista	13
8	(Portugal) Folha	Boavista	12
9	(Brazil) César	Benfica	10
9	(Portugal) António Oliveira	Penafiel	10
9	(Portugal) Manuel Fernandes	Sporting	10
