= João Laranjeira =

Portuguese footballer

Personal information
- Full name: João Gonçalves Laranjeira
- Date of birth: 28 September 1951 (age 75)
- Place of birth: Lisbon, Portugal
- Position: Centre-back

Youth career
- 1968–1970: Sporting

Senior career*
Years	Team	Apps	(Gls)
1970–1979	Sporting	151	(2)
1979–1982	Benfica	42	(2)
1982–1983	Amora	17	(0)
Total		210	(4)

International career
1972–1980	Portugal	12	(1)
- * Club domestic league appearances and goals

João Gonçalves Laranjeira (born 28 September 1951 in Lisbon) is a former Portuguese footballer who played for Sporting, Benfica and Amora F.C. in the Portuguese Liga, as central defender.

Laranjeira gained 12 caps for the Portugal national team.
