= Estádio José Alvalade (1956) =

Demolished stadium in Lisbon, Portugal

Coordinates: 38.7628177°N 9.1586173°W

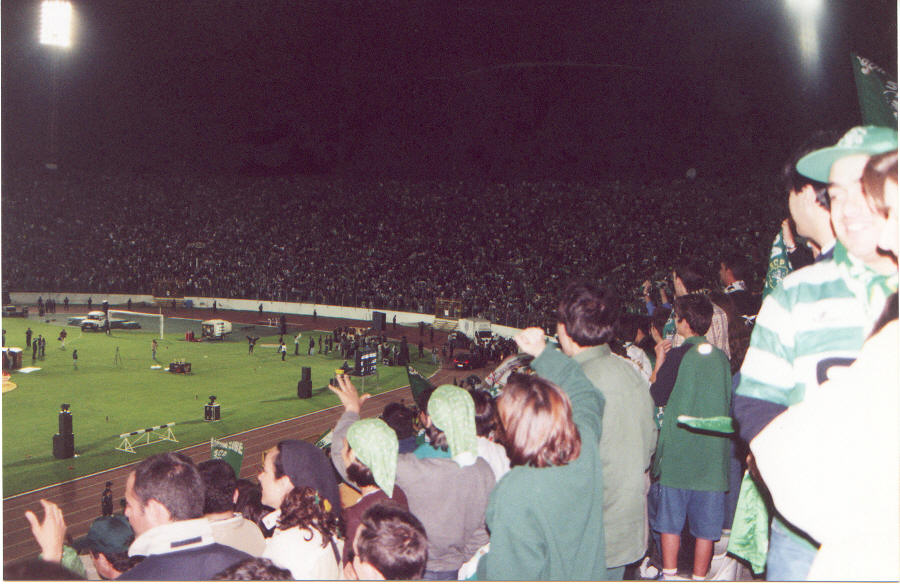
- Interactive map of Estádio José Alvalade
- Full name: Estádio José Alvalade
- Location: Lisbon, Portugal
- Owner: Sporting Clube de Portugal
- Capacity: 52,411
- Surface: Grass

Construction
- Built: 1956
- Opened: 10 June 1956
- Closed: 2003
- Demolished: 2003

Tenant
- Sporting Clube de Portugal

Estádio José Alvalade was a multi-purpose stadium in Lisbon, Portugal. At its heyday, the stadium was able to hold 75,000 people (with oral anecdotes recalling the stadium with over 85,000 at the 1993-94 UEFA Cup Second round tie against Celtic Glasgow) between the 1980s and late 1990s, but later its capacity was shortened to 52,411 people. It was inaugurated on 10 June 1956. Home venue of the football team of Sporting Clube de Portugal (Sporting CP) for 47 years, it was mostly used for football matches, but was also used for athletics and cycling. It was the first stadium in Portugal to be equipped with a lighting system that allowed for night-time activities. Designed by architects António Augusto Sá da Costa and Anselmo Fernandez, it was named after Sporting CP's founder José Alfredo Holtreman Roquette, known as José Alvalade. The stadium was closed in 2003, when the new Estádio José Alvalade designed by Tomás Taveira opened.

== Concerts ==
During the 1990s, the Estádio José Alvalade was one of the most prominent venues for rock concerts in Portugal, hosting tour dates of many high-profile international artists, including among others, rock band Bon Jovi, Depeche Mode, U2, R.E.M., David Bowie, Dire Straits, Elton John, Phil Collins, Pink Floyd, Bruce Springsteen, Metallica, Guns N' Roses, Bryan Adams and Genesis. This era was inaugurated on June 29, 1989 with a concert by The Cure, during their Prayer Tour promoting the album Disintegration. Tina Turner performed on September 29, 1990 and September 22, 1996. Dire Straits performed on May 16, 1992, on the On Every Street Tour. Michael Jackson performed on September 26, 1992, to a sold-out crowd of 55,000 people. Guns N' Roses performed on July 2, 1992, again to a sold-out crowd. Bruce Springsteen played to an overpacked stadium of 60,000 People in 1993. That is still the stadium's record for attendance.

== Portugal national football team ==
The national team first played in the stadium in 1957 and had its last game in 2002.

#	Date	Score	Opponent	Competition
1.	16 January 1957	1–1	Northern Ireland	World Cup 1958 qualification
2.	24 March 1957	0–1	France	Friendly
3.	3 June 1959	1–0	Scotland	Friendly
4.	17 May 1962	1–2	Belgium	Friendly
5.	16 April 1969	0–2	Switzerland	World Cup 1970 qualification
6.	14 November 1973	1–1	Northern Ireland	World Cup 1974 qualification
7.	19 November 1975	1–1	England	Euro 1976 qualifying
8.	22 December 1976	2–1	Italy	Friendly
9.	11 October 1978	1–1	Belgium	Euro 1980 qualifying
10.	23 September 1981	2–0	Poland	Friendly
11.	21 September 1983	5–0	Finland	Euro 1984 qualifying
12.	14 November 1984	1–3	Sweden	World Cup 1986 qualification
13.	30 January 1985	2–3	Romania	Friendly
14.	29 March 1989	6–0	Angola	Friendly
15.	13 November 1994	1–0	Austria	Euro 1996 qualifying
16.	5 June 1999	1–0	Slovakia	Euro 2000 qualifying
17.	6 June 2001	6–0	Cyprus	World Cup 2002 qualification
18.	14 November 2001	5–1	Angola	Friendly
19.	17 April 2002	1–1	Brazil	Friendly
