= Rui Jordão =

Portuguese footballer (1952–2019)

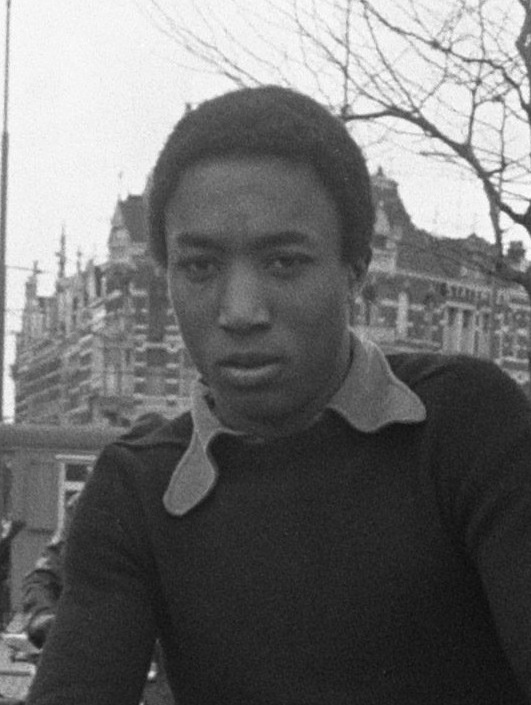
- Jordão in 1972

Personal information
- Full name: Rui Manuel Trindade Jordão
- Date of birth: 9 August 1952
- Place of birth: Benguela, Angola
- Date of death: 18 October 2019 (aged 67)
- Place of death: Cascais, Portugal
- Height: 1.79 m (5 ft 10 in)
- Position: Striker

Youth career
- Sporting Benguela
- 1970–1971: Benfica

Senior career*
Years	Team	Apps	(Gls)
1971–1976	Benfica	90	(63)
1976–1977	Zaragoza	33	(14)
1977–1979	Sporting CP	27	(23)
1979	New England Tea Men		
1979–1987	Sporting CP	180	(114)
1987–1989	Vitória Setúbal	60	(12)
Total		390	(226)

International career
1971	Portugal U18	7	(1)
1973	Portugal U21	2	(0)
1972–1989	Portugal	43	(15)
Medal record
Men's football
Representing Portugal
UEFA European Championship
Bronze medal – third place	1984 France
- * Club domestic league appearances and goals

Rui Manuel Trindade Jordão (Portuguese pronunciation: [ˈʁuj ʒuɾˈðɐ̃w]; 9 August 1952 – 18 October 2019) was a Portuguese footballer.

His professional career was spent mostly with two of the biggest clubs in the country, Benfica and Sporting CP. One of the most prolific strikers in the history of Portuguese football, he won the Silver Ball award twice, once with each team.

Jordão represented the Portugal national team for 17 years, appearing with them at Euro 1984.

== Club career ==
Born in Benguela, Portuguese Angola, Jordão moved in his teens to Portugal's Benfica, making his professional debut in 1971–72. He played 18 games and scored seven goals in his debut campaign, appearing slightly less in his second but still contributing five goals as the club won back-to-back Primeira Liga titles, only losing one match over two seasons.

Jordão signed with Spanish side Real Zaragoza in the summer of 1976, scoring regularly but being relegated from La Liga. Subsequently, he returned to his country of adoption and joined Sporting CP.

Jordão enjoyed his best years with the Lions, scoring in double figures in six of his first seven seasons, which included a total of 57 goals when the team won the league (1980 and 1982). At the age of 35, he moved to Vitória de Setúbal, reuniting with former Sporting teammate Manuel Fernandes, another prolific veteran goalscorer. He finished his career two years later, having scored 212 goals in the Portuguese top division alone.

== International career ==
In early 1972, Jordão won the first of his 43 caps for Portugal, against Cyprus in the 1974 FIFA World Cup qualifiers. Also in that year he was picked for the squad that lost the Brazilian Independence Cup, 1–0 to hosts Brazil.

On 13 November 1983, Jordão scored the decisive goal to beat the Soviet Union, as the national side won 1–0 in Lisbon and qualified for UEFA Euro 1984. In the final stages, they reached the semi-finals, where the player scored twice against hosts France in Marseille on 23 June – Portugal led 2–1 with only six minutes to go in extra time, after individual efforts and assists by Fernando Chalana, but eventually lost 3–2.

Jordão played his last international in 1989 at nearly 37, the same year of his club retirement. He had returned to the national team after several players were given punishments for the Saltillo Affair at the 1986 FIFA World Cup.

== Later life ==
After he retired, Jordão moved away from the football world and became a painter and a sculptor. He died on 18 October 2019 at the age of 67, having been hospitalised with heart problems in Cascais. Fernando Gomes, the president of the Portuguese Football Federation, delivered a statement describing him as "peerless".

== Career statistics ==
=== International ===
Portugal
Year	Apps	Goals
1972	8	2
1973	2	1
1974	1	0
1975	0	0
1976	1	0
1977	1	1
1978	0	0
1979	3	0
1980	6	3
1981	5	1
1982	1	0
1983	3	2
1984	7	5
1985	2	0
1986	0	0
1987	0	0
1988	2	0
1989	1	0
Total	43	15

=== International goals ===
Rui Jordão: International goals
No.	Date	Venue	Opponent	Score	Result	Competition
1	29 March 1972	Estádio da Luz, Lisbon, Portugal	Cyprus	4–0	4–0	1974 World Cup qualification
2	6 July 1972	Mineirão, Belo Horizonte, Brazil	Soviet Union	1–0	1–0	Brazilian Independence Cup
3	14 November 1973	Estádio José Alvalade, Lisbon, Portugal	Northern Ireland	1–0	1–1	1974 World Cup qualification
4	9 October 1977	Idrætsparken, Copenhagen, Denmark	Denmark	0–1	2–4	1978 World Cup qualification
5	24 September 1980	Stadio Luigi Ferraris, Genoa, Italy	Italy	1–1	3–1	Friendly
6	19 November 1980	Estádio da Luz, Lisbon, Portugal	Northern Ireland	1–0	1–0	1982 World Cup qualification
7	17 December 1980	Estádio da Luz, Lisbon, Portugal	Israel	2–0	3–0	1982 World Cup qualification
8	28 October 1981	Ramat Gan Stadium, Ramat Gan, Israel	Israel	1–1	4–1	1982 World Cup qualification
9	21 September 1983	Estádio José Alvalade, Lisbon, Portugal	Finland	1–0	5–0	Euro 1984 qualifying
10	13 November 1983	Estádio da Luz, Lisbon, Portugal	Soviet Union	1–0	1–0	Euro 1984 qualifying
11	2 June 1984	Estádio Nacional, Lisbon, Portugal	Yugoslavia	1–0	2–3	Friendly
12	2 June 1984	Estádio Nacional, Lisbon, Portugal	Yugoslavia	2–1	2–3	Friendly
13	23 June 1984	Stade Vélodrome, Marseille, France	France	1–1	3–2	UEFA Euro 1984
14	23 June 1984	Stade Vélodrome, Marseille, France	France	1–2	3–2	UEFA Euro 1984
15	14 November 1984	Estádio José Alvalade, Lisbon, Portugal	Sweden	1–0	1–3	1986 World Cup qualification

== Honours ==
Benfica

- Primeira Liga: 1971–72, 1972–73, 1974–75, 1975–76
- Taça de Portugal: 1971–72

Sporting CP

- Primeira Liga: 1979–80, 1981–82
- Taça de Portugal: 1977–78, 1981–82
- Supertaça Cândido de Oliveira: 1982

Individual

- Bola de Prata: 1975–76, 1979–80
- Portuguese Footballer of the Year: 1980
