= Estádio da Luz (1954) =

Former S.L. Benfica football stadium in Lisbon, Portugal

- A Catedral; O Inferno da Luz
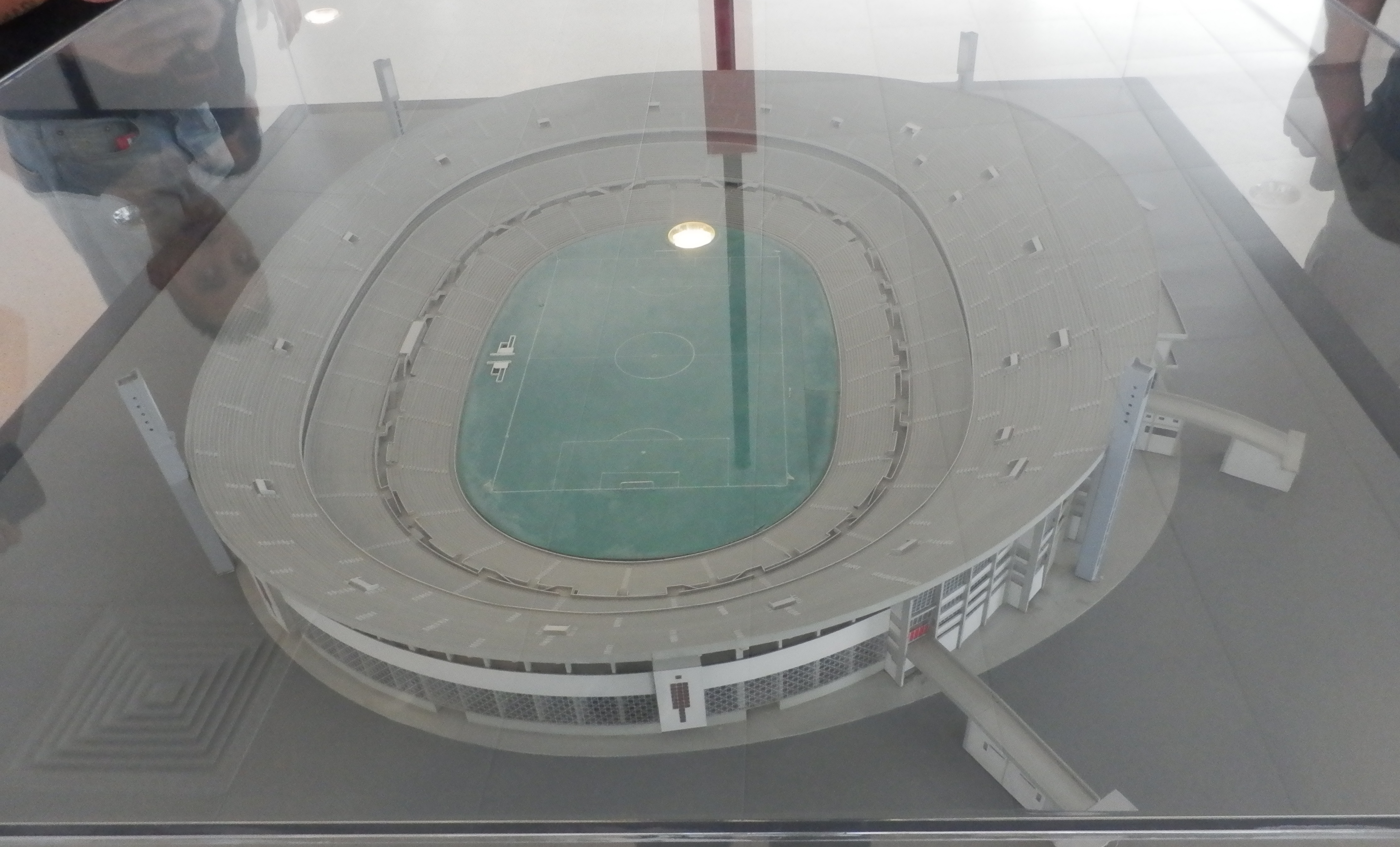
- A model of Estádio da Luz
- Interactive map of Estádio da Luz
- Full name: Estádio do Sport Lisboa e Benfica
- Former names: Estádio de Carnide (unofficial name)
- Location: Lisbon, Portugal
- Coordinates: 38.753611°N 9.182639°W
- Owner: Benfica (21 January 1969)
- Operator: Benfica
- Capacity: 40,000 (1954–1960); 70,000 (1960–1985); 120,000 (1985–1994); 78,000 (1994–2002)
- Surface: Grass
- Scoreboard: Yes
- Record attendance: 135,000 to 140,000; Benfica 3–1 Porto (4 January 1987)
- Field size: 105 x 74 m

Construction
- Groundbreaking: 14 June 1953
- Built: 1953–1959
- Opened: 1 December 1954
- Renovated: 1958, 1960, 1985, 1991, 1998
- Expanded: 1970 (180,000 m^{2}); 1981 (210,000 m^{2}); 1998 (260,000 m^{2})
- Closed: 22 March 2003
- Demolished: 2003
- Cost: 12,037,683$ (1956)
- Architect: João Simões

Tenants
- Benfica (1954–2003); Benfica B (2000–2003)

Website
- slbenfica.pt

Estádio da Luz (Portuguese pronunciation: [ɨˈʃtaðiu ðɐ ˈluʃ]), officially named Estádio do Sport Lisboa e Benfica, was a multi-purpose stadium located in Lisbon, Portugal.

It was used mostly for football matches and hosted the home matches of Benfica and the Portugal national team. The stadium was opened on 1 December 1954 and it was able to hold an official maximum of 120,000 people, making it the largest stadium in Europe and the third largest in the world in terms of capacity. Some of the biggest attendances include a game against Porto with an estimated attendance between 135,000 and 140,000 people, the 1989–90 European Cup semi-final against Marseille and the 1991 FIFA World Youth Championship final between Portugal and Brazil with 127,000 people in each game. It also hosted the 1992 European Cup Winners' Cup Final, the second leg of the 1983 UEFA Cup Final, and the 1962 Intercontinental Cup.

Its demolition started in 2002 so the new Estádio da Luz could be built near the same area.

== Background ==
Since the club's formation, in 1904, Benfica had played mostly in rented fields, such as Terras do Desembargador (1905–1906), the Campo da Feiteira (1908–1911), the Campo de Sete Rios (1913–1917), the Campo de Benfica (1917–1922), and the Estádio do Campo Grande, built on land rented from historic rivals Sporting (1941–1954). The Estádio das Amoreiras, a 20,000-capacity football stadium, belonged to the club, but was demolished to give way to a freeway (1925–1940).

After a long process of negotiation with the municipality of Lisbon, it was finally established, on 17 May 1946, that the club would leave the rented stadium and move back to the Benfica neighbourhood. At the end of the meeting where this was established, the then Minister of Public Works is quoted as saying: "Benfica is from Benfica and that's where it should return to".

== The construction years ==
An adequate terrain, with good accessibility and enough room for future expansion was identified, in the north-east end of the Benfica neighbourhood. Being located in the limit between the Benfica and the Carnide neighbourhoods, though, the new stadium was at first known as "Estádio de Carnide".

It was always the objective of the club to own both the stadium and the terrains, though at first a lease was made on the municipal terrains, with a final buy-out occurring only in 1969. The plans for the sports complex had been sketched as early as the late 1940s, by João Simões, a former player for the club.

Driven by the club's president, Joaquim Ferreira Bogalho, the associates coped with an increased fee for supporting the building costs for the new stadium, offered large donations, and some went as far as to work themselves on the building yard on holidays or weekends. There was even a "cement campaign", whereby large quantities of cement bags were offered to the club.

The works officially started on 14 June 1953. Less than two years after, and at a cost of 12,037,683 escudos (US$70,151), on 1 December 1954 (a national holiday), the 40,000 capacity-crowd filled the stadium for the inaugural match against rivals Porto.

== Improvements ==
The stadium at first had a capacity of 40,000, on two continuous tiers, but continued success of Benfica during the 1950s and, especially, the 1960s (the "golden years"), capacity increase was deemed inevitable.

The first stage of the famous third tier ("Terceiro Anel") was completed in 1960 and increased the capacity to 70,000. Flood-lighting had been introduced two years before.

The third tier was completed in 1985, setting the official capacity for the stadium at 120,000. Since there were no individual seats, this number was even surpassed on occasion. The 4 January 1987 championship match against Porto had an estimated attendance of between 135,000 and 140,000, and the final of the 1991 FIFA World Youth Championship, between Portugal and Brazil, had an official attendance of 127,000.

When the stadium was converted to all-seater in 1994, reducing the capacity to 78,000.

== The end ==
After the difficult period experienced in the 1990s, both in results and in finances, the club had to ponder how to cope with the successful bid the Portuguese Football Federation made to host the UEFA Euro 2004.

At first, it was suggested the old stadium could undergo renovation work including the covering of all the stands with a self-supporting roof. Two projects, by architect Tomás Taveira, were presented to the associates in a short period of time, but both were abandoned. At one time, it was suggested that the club withdraw its stadium from the list of host stadiums.

Finally, on 28 September 2001, a general assembly of the associates voted for the construction of the new stadium. This was by no means an easy decision, since the historic "Catedral" would have to be demolished to give way to the new complex. The option, though, was deemed a necessity to ensure the financial feasibility of the project. The approved proposal stated: "The Direction has decided to present to the associates the construction of a new stadium, fully conscious that this is the option that best responds to the earnings and needs of our Club, being both economically and financially sustainable, and will allow the associates of SL Benfica much better condition in which to follow the club's sporting events, in particular the football team's, and also revive our supporter base."

The team played at a partially demolished old stadium for a final season, with the then-reduced capacity-crowd of about 50,000 witnessing the last match of the old "Luz", on 22 March 2003. This was a round-26th championship match, against Santa Clara, won by Benfica with a lone penalty conversion by Simão Sabrosa.

Ending the season with the Estádio Nacional hosting Benfica's home matches, the club entered a new stage in its life, playing the first match in the "Nova Catedral" (the New Cathedral) on 25 October 2003. The new stadium would host the UEFA Euro 2004 Final match less than a year later.

== Portugal national football team ==
Oddly, despite the stadium being opened in 1954, it did not receive any national team matches until 1971 and held its last game there in 2001.

#	Date	Score	Opponent	Competition
1.	21 April 1971	2–0	Scotland	Euro 1972 qualifying
2.	21 November 1971	1–1	Belgium	Euro 1972 qualifying
3.	29 March 1972	4–0	Cyprus	World Cup 1974 qualification
4.	13 October 1973	2–2	Bulgaria	World Cup 1974 qualification
5.	3 April 1974	0–0	England	Friendly
6.	17 November 1976	1–0	Denmark	World Cup 1978 qualification
7.	29 November 1978	1–0	Scotland	Euro 1980 qualifying
8.	21 November 1979	1–2	Austria	Euro 1980 qualifying
9.	19 November 1980	1–0	Northern Ireland	World Cup 1982 qualification
10.	17 December 1980	3–0	Israel	World Cup 1982 qualification
11.	14 October 1981	1–2	Sweden	World Cup 1982 qualification
12.	18 November 1981	2–1	Scotland	World Cup 1982 qualification
13.	10 October 1982	2–1	Poland	Euro 1984 qualifying
14.	13 November 1983	1–0	Soviet Union	Euro 1984 qualifying
15.	12 October 1985	3–2	Malta	World Cup 1986 qualification
16.	15 February 1989	1–1	Belgium	World Cup 1990 qualification
17.	26 April 1989	3–1	Switzerland	World Cup 1990 qualification
18.	15 November 1989	0–0	Czechoslovakia	World Cup 1990 qualification
19.	29 August 1990	1–1	West Germany	Friendly
20.	20 November 1991	1–0	Greece	Euro 1992 qualifying
21.	28 April 1993	5–0	Scotland	World Cup 1994 qualification
22.	10 November 1993	3–0	Estonia	World Cup 1994 qualification
23.	18 December 1994	8–0	Liechtenstein	Euro 1996 qualifying
24.	15 November 1995	3–0	Republic of Ireland	Euro 1996 qualifying
25.	14 November 1996	0–0	Germany	World Cup 1998 qualification
26.	11 October 1997	1–0	Northern Ireland	World Cup 1998 qualification
27.	9 October 1999	3–0	Hungary	Euro 2000 qualifying
28.	7 October 2000	1–1	Republic of Ireland	World Cup 2002 qualification
29.	6 October 2001	5–0	Estonia	World Cup 2002 qualification

== Names ==
- Estádio do Sport Lisboa e Benfica: The old stadium, like the new one, was officially named "Estádio do Sport Lisboa e Benfica".
- Estádio de Carnide: At first, given the stadium's location, it was known generally as the "Estádio de Carnide", especially during the project and construction phases.

All the following names were used in reference to the old stadium, but now refer to the new one:

- Estádio da Luz: Within the neighbourhood of Carnide, the area located north of the stadium is called 'Luz' (literally, 'Light') by metonymy, after the church of Our Lady of the Light.
- A Catedral, literally, The Cathedral. The commercial brand used to promote ticket selling for the new stadium referred to it as "A Nova Catedral", or "the New Cathedral". The supporters just refer to it as The Cathedral, though, either reporting to the new or the old stadium.
- O Inferno da Luz: "the Inferno of Light", was used on occasion to describe the intense environment created by the 120,000 capacity crowd.
- O Terceiro Anel: the new stadium maintains a 3-tier structure, similar to the old one, not counting an additional tier for business boxes, so the traditional designation of the top tier is kept popularly as "Terceiro Anel" (literally, "Third Ring"), even though at first it was commercialized as the fourth-tier. The "Terceiro Anel" is also used to designate the die-hard supporters that crowd the stadium on important matches. These are famously known for their overwhelming support for the team (the aforementioned "Inferno da Luz"), but also for on occasion expressing their discontent with the team's least accomplished performances.

The former stadium is now commonly referred to as "O Velho Estádio" (the Old Stadium) or "A Velha Catedral" (the Old Cathedral).
