= 1981 Taça de Portugal final =

- Event: 1980–81 Taça de Portugal
Benfica	Porto
3	1
- Date: 6 June 1981
- Venue: Estádio Nacional, Oeiras
- Man of the Match: Nené (Benfica)
- Referee: Raúl Nazaré (Setúbal)

The 1981 Taça de Portugal final was the final match of the 1980–81 Taça de Portugal, the 41st season of the Taça de Portugal, the premier Portuguese football cup competition organized by the Portuguese Football Federation (FPF). The match was played on 6 June 1981 at the Estádio Nacional in Oeiras, and opposed two Primeira Liga sides: Benfica and Porto. Benfica defeated Porto 3–1 to claim the Taça de Portugal for a seventeenth time.

In Portugal, the final was televised live on RTP. As a result of the Águias claiming both the league and cup double in the same season, cup runners-up Porto faced their cup final opponents in the 1981 Supertaça Cândido de Oliveira.

== Match ==
=== Details ===
6 June 1981

Benfica	3–1	Porto
Nené 31', 55', 85'		Veloso 9' (o.g.)

Estádio Nacional, Oeiras
Referee: Alder Dante (Santarém)

Benfica	Porto

GK	1	(Portugal) Manuel Bento
DF		(Portugal) João Laranjeira
DF		(Portugal) Frederico Rosa
DF	2	(Portugal) António Veloso
DF		(Portugal) Minervino Pietra
MF		(Portugal) Shéu
MF		(Portugal) Carlos Manuel	(substituted off) 84'
MF		(Portugal) João Alves	(substituted off) 86'
MF		(Portugal) Fernando Chalana
FW		(Brazil) César
FW	7	(Portugal) Nené (c)
Substitutes:
DF		(Portugal) António Bastos Lopes	(substituted on) 86'
FW		(Portugal) Francisco Vital	(substituted on) 84'
Manager:
(Hungary) Lajos Baróti

GK	1	(Portugal) Tibi
DF	(Portugal) António Lima Pereira	(substituted off) 79'
DF	(Portugal) Gabriel Mendes
DF	(Portugal) Carlos Simões (c)
DF	4	(Portugal) Fernando Freitas
MF	(Portugal) Jaime Pacheco
MF	(Portugal) Rodolfo Reis
MF	(Portugal) Adelino Teixeira	(substituted off) 65'
MF	(Portugal) Jaime Magalhães
MF	(Portugal) José Alberto Costa
FW	(Republic of Ireland) Mickey Walsh
Substitutes:
MF	(Portugal) Romeu Silva	(substituted on) 79'
MF	(Portugal) António Sousa	(substituted on) 65'
Manager:
(Austria) Hermann Stessl

1980–81 Taça de Portugal Winners
Benfica
17th Title

Man of the match

- (Portugal) Nené (Benfica)

Match officials

- Assistant referees:
- Fourth official:

Match rules

- 90 minutes.
- 30 minutes of extra time if necessary.
- Maximum of two substitutions

== See also ==
- O Clássico
- 1980–81 S.L. Benfica season
