= 1976–77 S.L. Benfica season =

Benfica
1976–77 season
- President: Borges Coutinho (until 26 May 1977); José Ferreira Queimado
- Head coach: John Mortimore
- Stadium: Estádio da Luz
- Primeira Divisão: 1st
- Taça de Portugal: Round of 16
- European Cup: First round
- Top goalscorer: League: Nené (23); All: Nené (27)
Home colours

The 1976–77 season was Sport Lisboa e Benfica's 73rd season in existence and the club's 43rd consecutive season in the top flight of Portuguese football, covering the period from 1 July 1976 to 30 June 1977. Benfica competed domestically in the Primeira Divisão and the Taça de Portugal, and participated in the European Cup after winning the previous league.

In the new season, Benfica replaced league-winner, Mário Wilson by a foreigner. After a long saga, John Mortimore was chosen. In the transfer window, the club added Pietra and Carlos Alhinho and sold Rui Jordão. A complicated pre-season predicted a troubled start. In September, Benfica lost in the opening round with Sporting and drew the next two with Estoril Praia and Académica de Coimbra. At the same time, they were eliminated from the European Cup by Dynamo Dresden without scoring a goal. In October, another loss, now with Boavista, with Benfica sitting in 13th place, six points from the top. However, they managed to turn it around and won the following six matches. In January, while his rival Sporting was dropping points, Benfica gained five points and reduce their deficit to one. They passed them in February and despite a loss for the Portuguese Cup against them, Benfica kept on winning in the Primeira Divisão. Two away draws did not cause harm with Benfica finally securing their third title in a row in early May. It was their 14th title since 1960.

== Season summary ==
In the off-season, Benfica changed managers again. After guiding Benfica to their 22nd league title, Mário Wilson contract was not renewed and he moved to Boavista. His assistant Fernando Cabrita followed him. The press speculated on various names, such as John Mortimore, Bill McGarry and Dario Gradi. Signing a British manager was an obvious goal, and Gradi was first choice, landing in Lisbon on 22 June to discuss terms. However, he left the following day, as Director of Football, Romão Martins, and also several key players did not approve him. As alternative, Benfica thought of Peres Bandeira, who days before was offered the job of assistant to Gradi. An offer he rejected. Without manager, Benfica started their pre-season on 2 July with assistant Rui Silva in charge. At that point, the possible choices were either a Portuguese managers like Peres Bandeira and José Augusto or foreigners like Aymoré Moreira and Miguel Muñoz. Six days later, players agreed that a foreign manager was the best option and on 10 July, John Mortimore was selected. He arrived on 12 July to discuss his contract, which he signed a day later. He took over the team on 26 July. Contrasting with the troubled signing of a manager, Benfica made very few squad adjustments, notably just Pietra and later Carlos Alhinho. Biggest departure was Rui Jordão, who finally had his move to Spain. Benfica's first preparation games were in Brazil on 13 and 15 August, with the team competing in the Trofeo Cidade de Vigo shortly after. The pre-season ended with two games in Cameroon. After three losses in the preparation games, Toni worriedly said: "I am afraid of this team. The members will demand the league, but...".

The league began on 4 September with a visit to Estádio de Alvalade to play Sporting, with Benfica losing 3–0. A week later, another poor result in a home draw with Braga. On the opening night of the European Cup, Benfica lost to Dynamo Dresden by 2–0. A confident Mortimore predict the return leg: "70,000 fans will score one and the team will score two". On 19 September, Benfica visited Estádio António Coimbra da Mota to play Estoril Praia, dropping another point in a 1–1 draw, putting them in the 14th place. The first win only arrived a week later, with Académica de Coimbra at home. The first month of the season ended with a home draw with Dresden, which eliminated Benfica on the first round. Going out in the first round of the European Cup without scoring was unprecedented until then. October began with a game on the road against Vitória de Setúbal, which Benfica lost by 2–1. This put the team in 13th place, six points away from leaders Sporting. Mortimore was feeling the pressure and his work began to be questioned. Romão Martins responded with "With Hagan in 1970–71, we were six points from first place at match-day 15 and still won the league...". An members meet was also brought up to discuss the club signing policy, which blocked signing foreigners. It was rejected. Nonetheless, Benfica performance improved and with a win against Boavista, they started a winning run that extended until January. However, this wins did not reduce the distance to top, as Sporting kept a five-point lead.

With a draw on 5 January, against Eusébio's Beira-Mar, that distance returned to six points. In the following two match-days, Sporting first lost with Setúbal, and then drew with Boavista, while Benfica won both matches, thus reducing the distance between them to three points. Sporting with 26 and Benfica with 23 points. On the final match in January, Benfica beat Sporting by 2–1 at home and cut the distance to a single point. Two weeks later, both teams were level at the top, when Benfica beat Estoril Praia and Sporting drew with Portimonense. Benfica concluded the month by taking the first place from Sporting, with a win in Coimbra against Académica, while his rivals drew at home. In March, Benfica visited Alvalade for the round of 16 of the Portuguese Cup, losing three-nil with a hat-trick from Manoel. In the Primeira Divisão, on 20 March, Benfica beat Boavista in Estádio do Bessa and secured their ninth consecutive league win. They were stopped in the following week, when they drew in Estádio do Restelo with Belenenses. Due to Sporting's loss at home with Porto, Benfica gained a point over his rival. They had 36 and a three-point lead. Benfica would drop points again on 17 April, in a 1–1 draw against Vitória de Guimarães, but it did not harm their lead, as Sporting also drew in the same weekend. Three weeks later, on match-day 27, Benfica beat Beira-Mar by 4–0 and confirmed their 23rd league title. It was their six title in seven years, and their 14th in 18 years, broken down to a back-to-back and four three-in a row wins. Nené played all 30 matches and scored 23 goals, after being moved from right-winger to striker, due to the lack of quality options in that position. The 24 goals conceded by the team was also a league best.

== Competitions ==
Win Draw Loss Postponed

=== Overall record ===
Competition	First match	Last match	Record								
Competition	First match	Last match	G	W	D	L	GF	GA	GD	Win %	Source
Primeira Divisão	3 September 1977	30 May 1977	30	23	5	2	67	24	+43	76.67	
Taça de Portugal	27 November 1976	12 March 1977	4	3	0	1	9	4	+5	75.00	
European Cup	15 September 1976	29 September 1976	2	0	1	1	0	2	−2	0.00	
Total			36	26	6	4	76	30	+46	72.22	

=== Primeira Divisão ===
==== League table ====
Pos	Team	Pld	W	D	L	GF	GA	GD	Pts	Qualification or relegation
1	Benfica (C)	30	23	5	2	67	24	+43	51	Qualification to European Cup first round
2	Sporting CP	30	17	8	5	59	26	+33	42	Qualification to UEFA Cup first round
3	Porto	30	18	5	7	72	27	+45	41	Qualification to Cup Winners' Cup first round (Note: Porto qualified for the Cup Winners' Cup as winners of the 1978 Taça de Portugal Final.)
4	Boavista	30	13	8	9	41	33	+8	34	Qualification to UEFA Cup first round
5	Académica	30	14	6	10	29	25	+4	34	

Source: RSSSF and footballzz.co.uk
(C) Champions

==== Results by round ====
Round	1	2	3	4	5	6	7	8	9	10	11	12	13	14	15	16	17	18	19	20	21	22	23	24	25	26	27	28	29	30
Ground	A	H	A	H	A	H	A	H	H	A	H	A	H	A	H	H	A	H	A	H	A	H	A	A	H	A	H	A	H	A
Result	L	D	D	W	L	W	W	W	W	W	W	D	W	W	W	W	W	W	W	W	W	D	W	D	W	W	W	W	W	W
Position	14	14	14	11	11	10	7	3	2	2	2	2	2	2	2	2	2	2	1	1	1	1	1	1	1	1	1	1	1	1

Source: ForaDeJogo
A = Away; H = Home; W = Win; D = Draw; L = Loss

==== Matches ====
4 September 1976 1	Sporting	3–0	Benfica	Lisbon
18:00	Manuel Fernandes 60'; Camilo 75'; Baltasar 85'	Report		Stadium: Estádio de Alvalade; Referee: Porém Luís

11 September 1976 2	Benfica	2–2	Braga	Lisbon
18:00	Nené 49', 75' (pen.)	Report	Manaca 56'; Chico Gordo 70'	Stadium: Estádio da Luz; Referee: César Correia

19 September 1976 3	Estoril Praia	1–1	Benfica	Estoril
19:00	Clésio 28'	Report	Nené 1'	Stadium: Estádio António Coimbra da Mota; Referee: Américo Barradas

25 September 1976 4	Benfica	1–0	Académica de Coimbra	Lisbon
19:00	Chalana 53'	Report		Stadium: Estádio da Luz; Referee: António Garrido

3 October 1976 5	Vitória de Setúbal	2–1	Benfica	Setúbal
18:00	Jacinto João 23'; Carlos Cardoso 39'	Report	Nené 62'	Stadium: Estádio do Bonfim; Referee: Mário Luís

24 October 1976 6	Benfica	2–1	Boavista	Lisbon
18:00	Vítor Baptista 56'; Nelinho 79'	Report	Celso 54'	Stadium: Estádio da Luz; Referee: Ismael Baltasar

31 October 1976 7	Belenenses	2–3	Benfica	Lisbon
18:00	Vítor Esmoriz 31'; Vasques 68'	Report	Nené 2'; Bastos Lopes 7'; Vítor Baptista 11'	Stadium: Estádio do Restelo; Referee: António Espanhol

6 November 1976 8	Benfica	2–0	Varzim	Lisbon
19:00	Nené 17', 71'	Report		Stadium: Estádio da Luz; Referee: Francisco Lobo

21 November 1976 9	Benfica	1–0	Vitória de Guimarães	Lisbon
19:00	Vítor Baptista 56'	Report		Stadium: Estádio da Luz; Referee: Leitão Soares

11 December 1976 10	Portimonense	1–2	Benfica	Portimão
18:00	Sapinho 58'	Report	Vítor Baptista 64', 90'	Stadium: Estádio Municipal de Portimão; Referee: José Luís Tavares

19 December 1976 11	Benfica	3–1	Leixões	Lisbon
18:00	Shéu 19'; Vítor Baptista 35'; Nené 85'	Report	Frasco 86'	Stadium: Estádio da Luz; Referee: Alder Dante

5 January 1977 12	Beira-Mar	2–2	Benfica	Aveiro
19:00	Abel 26'; Soares 56'	Report	Chalana 19'; Pietra 30'	Stadium: Estádio Mário Duarte; Referee: Melo Acúrsio

9 January 1977 13	Benfica	4–1	Montijo	Lisbon
18:00	Shéu 19'; Chalana 54'; Nelinho 72'; Nené 90'	Report	Fonseca 22'	Stadium: Estádio da Luz; Referee: Albino Rodrigues

16 January 1977 14	Porto	0–1	Benfica	Porto
17:00		Report	Chalana 11'	Stadium: Estádio das Antas; Referee: Porém Luís

22 January 1977 15	Benfica	6–0	Atlético	Lisbon
18:00	Nené 4', 7', 75' (pen.), 81'; Vítor Martins 27'; Alhinho 89'	Report		Stadium: Estádio da Luz; Referee: Marques Pires

30 January 1977 16	Benfica	2–1	Sporting	Lisbon
18:00	Vítor Martins 22'; Chalana 83'	Report	Manuel Fernandes 35'	Stadium: Estádio da Luz; Referee: Mário Luís

6 February 1977 17	Braga	0–1	Benfica	Braga
19:00		Report	Nelinho 70'	Stadium: Estádio 1º de Maio; Referee: Fernando Alberto

13 February 1977 18	Benfica	6–1	Estoril Praia	Lisbon
19:30	Nené 4', 79'; José Luís 40'; Nelinho 44', 85'; Vítor Martins 70'	Report	Vítor Móia 77'	Stadium: Estádio da Luz; Referee: António Ferreira

27 February 1977 19	Académica de Coimbra	0–1	Benfica	Coimbra
18:00		Report	Chalana 37'	Stadium: Estádio Municipal de Coimbra; Referee: Jaime Loureiro

6 March 1977 20	Benfica	3–1	Vitória de Setúbal	Lisbon
19:00	Shéu 32', 48'; Vítor Martins 47'	Report	Jacinto João 66' (pen.)	Stadium: Estádio da Luz; Referee: Guilherme Alves

20 March 1977 21	Boavista	0–3	Benfica	Porto
20:00		Report	Vítor Martins 10'; Nelinho 64'; Chalana 76'	Stadium: Estádio do Bessa; Referee: Raúl Nazaré

27 March 1977 22	Benfica	1–1	Belenenses	Lisbon
18:00	Nené 67'	Report	Artur Jorge 13'	Stadium: Estádio da Luz; Referee: António Garrido

3 April 1977 23	Varzim	0–1	Benfica	Póvoa de Varzim
17:00		Report	Chalana 31'	Stadium: Estádio do Varzim SC; Referee: Mário Luís

17 April 1977 24	Vitória de Guimarães	1–1	Benfica	Guimarães
18:00	Pedroto 51'	Report	Nelinho 85'	Stadium: Estádio D. Afonso Henriques; Referee: Porém Luís

24 April 1977 25	Benfica	5–1	Portimonense	Lisbon
18:00	Chalana 14'; Nelinho 65'; José Luís 67' Shéu 80'; Nené 89'	Report	Fernando 50'	Stadium: Estádio da Luz; Referee: Ismael Baltasar

30 April 1977 26	Leixões	1–2	Benfica	Matosinhos
18:30	Folha 70'	Report	Pietra 51'; Nené 60'	Stadium: Estádio do Mar; Referee: Francisco Lobo

8 May 1977 27	Benfica	4–0	Beira-Mar	Lisbon
18:00	Nené 12', 55', 63'; Alhinho 74'	Report		Stadium: Estádio da Luz; Referee: António Espanhol

15 May 1977 28	Montijo	0–1	Benfica	Montijo
18:30		Report	Nelinho 78'	Stadium: Campo Luís de Almeida Fidalgo; Referee: Leitão Soares

22 May 1977 29	Benfica	3–1	Porto	Lisbon
20:00	Chalana 14'; Pietra 53', 60'	Report	Taí 71'	Stadium: Estádio da Luz; Referee: César Correia

30 May 1977 30	Atlético	0–2	Benfica	Lisbon
18:30		Report	Vítor Martins 42'; Nené 72'	Stadium: Estádio da Tapadinha; Referee: António Ferreira

=== Taça de Portugal ===
27 November 1976 Third Rd	Benfica	3–0	Riopele	Lisbon
16:00	Nené 46', 48', 72'	Report		Stadium: Estádio da Luz; Referee: Inácio de Almeida

29 December 1976 Fourth Rd	Benfica	1–0	Chaves	Lisbon
16:00	José Luís 75'	Report		Stadium: Estádio da Luz; Referee: Raúl Nazaré

21 February 1977 Fifth Rd	Benfica	5–1	Espinho	Lisbon
16:00	Shéu 7', 33'; Nené 19', 74'; Chalana 37'	Report	Serrão II 41'	Stadium: Estádio da Luz; Referee: Francico Lobo

12 March 1977 Round of 16	Sporting	3–0	Benfica	Lisbon
16:00	Manoel 10', 52', 57'	Report		Stadium: Estádio de Alvalade; Referee: Inácio de Almeida

=== European Cup ===
==== First round ====
15 September 1976 First Leg	Dynamo Dresden (East Germany)	2–0	(Portugal) Benfica	Dresden
20:00	Kotte 74'; Riedel 78'	Report		Stadium: Stadion Dresden; Attendance: 30,000; Referee: Franz Wöhrer

29 September 1976 First leg	Benfica (Portugal)	0–0 (0–2 agg.)	(East Germany)	Lisbon
21:30		Report		Stadium: Estádio da Luz; Attendance: 50,000; Referee: Robert Schaut

=== Taça Federação Portuguesa de Futebol ===
Clube	J	V	E	D	GM	GS	+/-	Pts
Estoril Praia	6	3	2	1	11	8	+3	8
Benfica	6	3	2	1	13	8	+5	8
Sporting CP	6	2	2	2	11	12	-2	6
Belenenses	6	1	0	5	6	13	-7	2

5 June 1977 1	Benfica	2–0	Belenenses	Lisbon
				Stadium: Estádio da Luz

10 June 1977 2	Sporting	2–2	Benfica	Lisbon
	Keita 52'; Manuel Fernandes 76' (pen.)		Nené 32'; Carlos Alhinho 85'	Stadium: Estádio de Alvalade; Attendance: 20,000; Referee: Marques Pires

12 June 1977 3	Benfica	2–2	Estoril Praia	Lisbon
				Stadium: Estádio da Luz

14 June 1977 4	Belenenses	1–2	Benfica	Lisbon
	José Rocha 80'		Shéu 12'; Nelinho 73'	Stadium: Estádio do Restelo; Referee: Francisco Lobo

23 June 1977 5	Benfica	3–0	Sporting	Lisbon
	Artur Correia; Shéu; Manuel Bento (pen.)			Stadium: Estádio da Luz; Referee: Raúl Nazaré

26 June 1977 6	Estoril Praia	3–2	Benfica	Estoril
				Stadium: Estádio António Coimbra da Mota

(Note: This competition is missing from the Almanac, which serves as the main source for the statistics. Therefore, the tournament statistics are excluded due to the lack of reliable sources.)

=== Friendlies ===
13 August 1976	Portuguesa	3–1	Benfica	Rio de Janeiro
			Mário Moinhos 5'	Stadium: Estádio São Januário

15 August 1976	Santa Cruz	2–0	Benfica	Recife
	Mazinho 57'; Edson 84'			Stadium: Arruda

18 August 1976 Trofeo Vigo	Deportivo de La Coruña	0–3	Benfica	Vigo
			Diamantino Costa 8'; Nené 20' (pen.); Mário Moinhos 39' (pen.)	Stadium: Balaídos; Referee: Ausocual

19 August 1976 Trofeo Vigo	Celta de Vigo	1–0	Benfica	Vigo
	Richard Camera 41'			Stadium: Balaídos; Referee: Lopez Cuadrado

26 August 1976	Cameroon	0–1	Benfica	Yaoundé
			José Domingos	Stadium: Stade Ahmadou Ahidjo

29 August 1976	Cameroon	2–2	Benfica	Douala
	Rene Emana; Jean Marie T'Sebo		Mário Moinhos	Stadium: Stade de la Réunification

9 October 1976 Carlos Lopes Tstm	Sporting	2–3	Benfica	Lisbon
	Manoel Costa		Chalana; Cavungi; Nelinho	Stadium: Estádio de Alvalade; Attendance: 40,000

9 February 1977 Alex Stepney Tstm	Manchester United	2–1	Benfica	Manchester
	Steve Coppell; Lou Macari 12'		Chalana 74'	Stadium: Old Trafford; Attendance: 45,000

8 April 1977 Braga TM	Benfica	2–0	Vitória Guimarães	Braga
	Vítor Martins; Chalana			Stadium: Estádio 1º de Maio

10 April 1977 Braga TM	Benfica	1–0	Braga	Braga
	Nené			Stadium: Estádio 1º de Maio

24 May 1977	Marítimo	2–3	Benfica	Funchal
	Norberto; Arnaldo 85'		Chalana 10'; Pietra 55'	Stadium: Estádio dos Barreiros

1 June 1977 José Henrique Tstm	Benfica	1–1 (5–4 p)	Primeira Divisão XI	Lisbon
	Chalana		Jaílson Guimarães	Stadium: Estádio da Luz; Attendance: 20,000; Referee: António Garrido
	Penalties
	Nelinho (penalty scored); Chalana (penalty scored); Pietra (penalty scored); Jorge (penalty scored); Artur Correia (penalty scored)		(penalty scored) João Alves; (penalty scored) Torres; (penalty scored) Diamantino; (penalty scored) António Sousa; (penalty missed) Orlando Fonseca

11 June 1977 Portugal Day	Sporting	2–1	Benfica	Paris
	Manuel Fernandes; Manoel Costa		Shéu	Stadium: Parc des Princes; Attendance: 20,000

12 June 1977 Portugal Day	Avenir	1–5	Benfica	Beggen
	Marcel Bamberg		Vítor Martins; Chalana; Shéu; Nené	Stadium: Stade rue Henri Dunant

18 June 1977 Trofeo Ibérico	Ferencvárosi	1–1 (5–4 p)	Benfica	Badajoz
	Mucha József		Artur Correia	Stadium: Estadio El Vivero
	Penalties
			(penalty scored) Nelinho; (penalty scored) Pietra; (penalty scored) Romeu Silva; (penalty scored) Manuel Bento; (penalty missed) Vítor Martins

19 June 1977 Trofeo Ibérico	Badajoz	1–2	Benfica	Badajoz
	Serrano		Pietra; Chalana	Stadium: Estadio El Vivero

== Player statistics ==
The squad for the season consisted of the players listed in the tables below, as well as staff member John Mortimore (manager), Rui Silva (assistant manager).

Note 1: Note: Flags indicate national team as defined under FIFA eligibility rules. Players may hold more than one non-FIFA nationality.

Note 2: Players with squad numbers marked ‡ joined the club during the 1976-77 season via transfer, with more details in the following section.

No.	Pos	Nat	Player	Total		Primeira Divisão		Taça de Portugal		European Cup	
No.	Pos	Nat	Player	Apps	Goals	Apps	Goals	Apps	Goals	Apps	Goals
1	GK	(Portugal) POR	Manuel Bento	33	0	28	0	3	0	2	0
1	GK	(Portugal) POR	José Henrique	4	0	3	0	1	0	0	0
1	GK	(Portugal) POR	Álvaro Reis	1	0	1	0	0	0	0	0
2^{‡}	DF	(Portugal) POR	Minervino Pietra	29	4	26	4	3	0	0	0
2	DF	(Portugal) POR	Alberto Fonseca	13	0	10	0	3	0	0	0
3^{‡}	DF	(Portugal) POR	Carlos Alhinho	25	2	22	2	3	0	0	0
3	DF	(Portugal) POR	Artur Correia	16	0	13	0	1	0	2	0
4	DF	(Portugal) POR	Eurico Gomes	29	0	25	0	3	0	1	0
4	DF	(Portugal) POR	Messias Timula	2	0	1	0	0	0	1	0
4	DF	(Portugal) POR	António Barros	14	0	10	0	2	0	2	0
5	DF	(Portugal) POR	António Bastos Lopes	30	1	25	1	3	0	2	0
5	MF	(Portugal) POR	José Luís	27	3	25	2	2	1	0	0
6	MF	(Portugal) POR	Romeu Silva	14	0	11	0	1	0	2	0
6	MF	(Portugal) POR	Toni	27	0	23	0	3	0	1	0
7	FW	(Portugal) POR	Nené	36	28	30	23	4	5	2	0
8	MF	(Portugal) POR	Nelinho	28	9	24	9	4	0	0	0
8	MF	(Portugal) POR	Vítor Martins	28	6	24	6	3	0	1	0
9	FW	(Portugal) POR	Vítor Baptista	8	6	6	6	1	0	1	0
9	FW	(Portugal) POR	José Domingos	7	0	6	0	0	0	1	0
9	FW	(Portugal) POR	Mário Moinhos	16	0	12	0	2	0	2	0
10	MF	(Portugal) POR	Fernando Chalana	33	11	28	10	3	1	2	0
11	MF	(Portugal) POR	Diamantino Costa	3	0	2	0	0	0	1	0
11	MF	(Portugal) POR	Shéu	32	7	26	5	4	2	2	0
11	FW	(Portugal) POR	Cavungi	3	0	1	0	2	0	0	0

== Transfers ==
=== In ===
Entry date	Position	Player	From club	Fee	Ref
1 July 1976	MF	Joaquim Simões	Belenenses	Undisclosed	
5 August 1976	DF	Minervino Pietra	Belenenses	Undisclosed	

=== In by loan ===
Entry date	Position	Player	From club	Exit date	Ref
22 September 1976	DF	Carlos Alhinho	Real Betis	30 June 1977	

=== Out ===
Exit date	Position	Player	To club	Fee	Ref
3 June 1976	FW	Rui Jordão	Zaragoza	Undisclosed	
29 June 1976	DF	Eduardo Luís	Marítimo	Undisclosed	
21 September 1976	MF	Ibraim Silva	Varzim	Free	
21 September 1976	FW	Vítor Móia	Estoril Praia	Free	
2 April 1977	MF	Diamantino Costa	Team Hawaii	Free	
13 May 1977	DF	Amândio Malta da Silva	San Jose Earthquakes	Free	

=== Out by loan ===
Exit date	Position	Player	To club	Return date	Ref
1 July 1976	FW	Orlando Fonseca	Montijo	30 June 1977	
5 July 1976	GK	António Fidalgo	Braga	30 June 1977	
10 March 1977	DF	Messias Timula	Rochester Lancers	1 August 1977	
13 May 1977	MF	Toni	Quicksilvers	1 August 1977	
