= 1978 Taça de Portugal final =

- Event: 1977–78 Taça de Portugal
Porto	Sporting CP
Porto	Sporting CP
1	1
- Date: 17 June 1978
- Venue: Estádio Nacional, Oeiras
- Referee: Francisco Lobo (Setúbal)

Replay
Porto	Sporting CP
1	2
- Date: 24 June 1978
- Venue: Estádio Nacional, Oeiras
- Referee: Rosa Santos (Beja)

The 1978 Taça de Portugal final was the final match of the 1977–78 Taça de Portugal, the 38th season of the Taça de Portugal, the premier Portuguese football cup competition organized by the Portuguese Football Federation (FPF). The final was played at the Estádio Nacional in Oeiras, and opposed two Primeira Liga sides Porto and Sporting CP. As the inaugural final match finished 1–1, the final was replayed a week later at the same venue with the Leões defeating the Portistas 2–1 to claim a tenth Taça de Portugal.

== Match ==
=== Details ===
17 June 1978

Porto	1–1 (a.e.t.)	Sporting CP
F. Gomes 48'		Meneses 49'

Estádio Nacional, Oeiras
Referee: Francisco Lobo (Setúbal)

Porto	Sporting CP

GK	1	(Portugal) João Fonseca
DF	(Portugal) Gabriel Mendes
DF	(Portugal) Alfredo Murça	(substituted off) 71'
DF	(Portugal) Carlos Simões
MF	(Portugal) Fernando Freitas
MF	(Portugal) Octávio Machado
MF	(Portugal) Adelino Teixeira
MF	(Brazil) Ademir Vieira	Sent off (straight red)
MF	(Portugal) António Oliveira (c)
FW	(Portugal) Seninho	(substituted off) 92'
FW	(Portugal) Fernando Gomes
Substitutes:
DF	(Portugal) Teixeirinha	(substituted on) 71'
FW	(Brazil) Duda	(substituted on) 92'
Manager:
(Portugal) José Maria Pedroto

GK	1	(Portugal) António Botelho
DF	(Portugal) Augusto Inácio
DF	(Portugal) Francisco Barão	(substituted off) 71'
DF	(Brazil) Paulo Meneses
DF	(Portugal) João Laranjeira (c)
DF	(Portugal) Artur Correia
MF	(Brazil) Ailton Ballesteros
MF	(Portugal) Vítor Gomes
FW	(Mali) Salif Keïta
FW	(Brazil) Manoel Costa
FW	(Portugal) Manuel Fernandes	(substituted off) 117'
Substitutes:
MF	(Portugal) Ademar Marques	(substituted on) 71'
FW	(Portugal) Carlos Freire	(substituted on) 117'
Manager:
(Portugal) José Rodrigues Dias

Match officials

- Assistant referees:
- Fourth official:

Match rules

- 90 minutes.
- 30 minutes of extra time if necessary.
- Maximum of two substitutions

== Replay ==
=== Details ===
24 June 1978

Porto	1 – 2	Sporting CP
Seninho 80'		V. Gomes 55'; Fernandes 62'

Estádio Nacional, Oeiras
Referee: Rosa Santos (Beja)

Porto	Sporting CP

GK	1	(Portugal) João Fonseca
DF		(Portugal) Gabriel Mendes
DF		(Portugal) Carlos Simões
DF		(Portugal) Teixeirinha
DF		(Portugal) António Taí
MF		(Portugal) Adelino Teixeira
MF		(Portugal) Carlos Brandão
MF		(Portugal) Octávio Machado
FW		(Brazil) Duda
FW		(Portugal) Seninho
FW		(Portugal) Fernando Gomes (c)
Substitutes:
Manager:
(Portugal) José Maria Pedroto

GK	1	(Portugal) António Botelho
DF	(Portugal) Augusto Inácio
DF	(Portugal) João Laranjeira (c)
DF	(Portugal) Artur Correia
DF	(Brazil) Paulo Meneses
MF	(Brazil) Ailton Ballesteros
MF	(Portugal) Vítor Gomes	(substituted off) 81'
FW	(Mali) Salif Keïta
FW	(Brazil) Manoel Costa
FW	(Portugal) Ademar Marques
FW	(Portugal) Manuel Fernandes
Substitutes:
DF	(Portugal) Rui Cerdeira	(substituted on) 81'
Manager:
(Portugal) José Rodrigues Dias

1977–78 Taça de Portugal Winners
Sporting CP
10th Title

Match officials

- Assistant referees:
- Fourth official:

Match rules

- 90 minutes.
- 30 minutes of extra time if necessary.
- Maximum of two substitutions

== See also ==
- FC Porto–Sporting CP rivalry
