= 1981–82 S.L. Benfica season =

Benfica
1981–82 season
- President: Fernando Martins
- Head coach: Lajos Baróti
- Stadium: Estádio da Luz
- Primeira Divisão: 2nd
- Taça de Portugal: Semi-finals
- European Cup: Second round
- Supertaça Cândido de Oliveira: Runners-up
- Top goalscorer: League: Nené (24); All: Nené (37)
Home colours

The 1981–82 season was Sport Lisboa e Benfica's 78th season in existence and the club's 48th consecutive season in the top flight of Portuguese football, covering the period from 1 July 1981 to 30 June 1982. Benfica competed domestically in the Primeira Divisão, Taça de Portugal and the Supertaça Cândido de Oliveira, and participated in the European Cup after winning the previous league.

In Baróti's second season, Benfica invests heavily to strengthened their choices of forwards, signing Fernando Folha from Boavista, plus the Yugoslavian Zoran Filipovic from abroad. However, the league campaign is disappointing, with Benfica losing three times before November. In other competitions, Benfica loses to 4–1 to Bayern Munich in the European Cup; the same result that Porto defeated them in the Supertaça. In the second half of the season, Benfica kept chasing Sporting in the title race, with the distance fluctuating several times, the shortest at three points, the longest at seven. In April, Benfica is knocked-out of the Portuguese Cup and a month later, loses the title to Sporting.

== Season summary ==
Benfica started the new season as reigning champions, after Lajos Baróti led the team to their first league title in three years. Before President José Ferreira Queimado left his job, he signed a one-year extension with Baróti, something that new President Fernando Martins did not agree, claiming it left him with his hands tied. Toni became his assistant manager. In the pre-season, Benfica lost the aforementioned Toni to retirement, but invested heavily into forwards. To sign Fernando Folha from Boavista, Benfica had to outspent Porto and add Jorge Silva to the transfer. They also signed Yugoslavian striker Zoran Filipovic from Club Brugge. Other strikers approached but not signed were Pier Tol, Fernando Gomes, Sarr Boubacar, and Peter Houtman. The pre-season began on 28 July with medical tests and the presentation game with Boavista occurred on 4 August. Afterwards, Benfica competed in the inaugural Lisbon International Tournament and had a short tour for North America, competing in the Toronto Tournament. Due to the events of past season in a home match with Espinho, the first home match in the new season was played in the Estádio Nacional.

Benfica started defending their champions badge on 22 August in the Clássico with Porto, losing 2–1. They won their following three league matches, but were surprised by Amora, who defeated them on match-day 5. Before the end of September, Benfica was four points behind leaders Porto. Meanwhile, in the European Cup, Benfica had not problem surpassing Omonia in the first round. In October, Benfica's league performance remained poor, with another away loss in match-day 7, followed one week later, by a 1–1 draw in the Lisbon derby with Sporting. They were now in fifth place. The situation in Europe also degraded with Benfica losing 4–1 to Bayern Munich in early November and being knocked-out.In the Primeira Divisão, Benfica regained their footing with six consecutive wins before the end of the first half. Notwithstanding, they conceded another 4–1 loss, now for Supertaça Cândido de Oliveira with Porto and lost the trophy.

On 17 January, Benfica lost in Bessa with Boavista, finishing the first half of the league with 21 points, four behind leaders Sporting. A week later, Benfica beat Porto at home by 3–1, only to close the month with an away draw with Portimonense. The gap was now at five points. In February, another loss, 1–0 with Vitória de Guimarães, with Sporting increasing their lead to seven points. In the opening match-day of March, Benfica drops more points in an away draw with Estoril Praia, but Sporting had also drawn on the same day, so no changes occurred in the table. In mid March, Benfica won one-nil in the quarter-final of the Portuguese Cup in Estádio das Antas with an extra-time goal from Nené. A week later, they defeated Rio Ave and cut the distance to Sporting to five points, due to their rivals loss in the same match-day. The month closed with a decisive Derby between Sporting and Benfica, with the first winning by 3–1 in a hot game. In the second half, Manuel Fernandes inadvertently kicked Bento in the head, with the keeper responding by throwing the ball to his face. He was sent-off and a penalty signalled, with Rui Jordão making the 2–1. The gap between both teams was back at seven points.

On match-day 24, Benfica recovers two points in the title race, when Sporting loses to Portimonense and they beat Belenenses at home. A few days later, on 11 April, Benfica was knocked-out of the Portuguese Cup with a loss with Braga. The Primeira Divisão title reopened in the two last match-days of April. First on the 18, Sporting drops points at home, while Benfica wins, shortening the distance to four points. On 25 April, Benfica beats Braga at home, while Sporting drops points in Guimarães. The distance was now three points with four match-days to go. However, any hope of retaining the title was crushed when Benfica drew with Vitória de Setúbal on 2 May, while Sporting won on the same day. On 9 May, Sporting confirmed their league title, with Benfica eventually finishing the campaign with 44 points, two short of his rivals. Baróti was replaced Sven-Göran Eriksson at the end of the season.

== Competitions ==
Win Draw Loss Postponed

=== Overall record ===
Competition	First match	Last match	Record								
Competition	First match	Last match	G	W	D	L	GF	GA	GD	Win %	Source
Primeira Divisão	22 August 1981	23 May 1982	30	20	4	6	60	22	+38	66.67	
Taça de Portugal	22 November 1981	10 April 1982	7	5	1	1	14	3	+11	71.43	
European Cup	16 September 1981	4 November 1981	4	2	1	1	5	4	+1	50.00	
Supertaça Cândido de Oliveira	1 December 1981	8 December 1981	2	1	0	1	3	4	−1	50.00	
Total			43	28	6	9	82	33	+49	65.12	

=== Supertaça Cândido de Oliveira ===
1 December 1981 First leg	Benfica	2–0	Porto	Lisbon
21:00	Nené 7', 29'			Stadium: Estádio da Luz; Referee: António Garrido

8 December 1981 Second leg	Porto	4–1	Benfica	Porto
20:30	Jacques 27', 65', 70'; Alberto Costa 79'		Jorge Gomes 58'	Stadium: Estádio das Antas; Referee: Alder Dante

=== Primeira Divisão ===
==== League table ====
Pos	Team	Pld	W	D	L	GF	GA	GD	Pts	Qualification or relegation
1	Sporting CP (C)	30	19	8	3	66	26	+40	46	Qualification to European Cup first round
2	Benfica	30	20	4	6	60	22	+38	44	Qualification to UEFA Cup first round
3	Porto	30	17	9	4	46	17	+29	43	Qualification to UEFA Cup first round
4	Vitória de Guimarães	30	13	12	5	42	22	+20	38	Qualification to UEFA Cup first round
5	Rio Ave	30	13	8	9	26	31	−5	34	

Source: RSSSF and footballzz.co.uk
(C) Champions

==== Results by round ====
Round	1	2	3	4	5	6	7	8	9	10	11	12	13	14	15	16	17	18	19	20	21	22	23	24	25	26	27	28	29	30
Ground	A	H	A	H	A	H	A	H	A	H	A	H	A	H	A	H	A	H	A	H	A	H	A	H	A	H	A	H	A	H
Result	L	W	W	W	L	W	L	D	W	W	W	W	W	W	L	W	D	W	L	W	D	W	L	W	W	W	D	W	W	W
Position	13	6	4	3	4	3	3	5	4	3	3	3	2	2	2	2	2	2	2	2	2	2	2	2	2	2	2	2	2	2

Source: ForaDeJogo
A = Away; H = Home; W = Win; D = Draw; L = Loss

==== Matches ====
22 August 1981 1	Porto	2–1	Benfica	Porto
20:00	Romeu 55'; Jaime Magalhães 59'	Report	Filipovic 87'	Stadium: Estádio das Antas; Referee: Raúl Nazaré

30 August 1981 2	Benfica	2–0	Portimonense	Lisbon
19:00	Nené 8', 71' (pen.)	Report		Stadium: Estádio Nacional; Referee: Rosa Santos

6 September 1981 3	União de Leiria	0–3	Benfica	Leiria
18:30		Report	Humberto Coelho 12'; Nené 15'; Pietra 83'	Stadium: Estádio Dr. Magalhães Pessoa; Referee: Alder Dante

13 September 1981 4	Benfica	1–0	Vitória de Guimarães	Lisbon
20:30	Filipovic 41'	Report		Stadium: Estádio da Luz; Referee: Miranda Dias

20 September 1981 5	Amora	1–0	Benfica	Amora
19:00	Amadeu 80'	Report		Stadium: Estádio da Medideira; Referee: Albino Rodrigues

26 September 1981 6	Benfica	3–0	Estoril Praia	Lisbon
19:00	Nené 37', 89'; Filipovic 73'	Report		Stadium: Estádio da Luz; Referee: Ezequiel Feijão

17 October 1981 7	Rio Ave	1–0	Benfica	Vila do Conde
19:00	Manuel Pires 74'	Report		Stadium: Campo da Avenida; Referee: Marques Pires

1 November 1981 8	Benfica	1–1	Sporting	Lisbon
20:00	Nené 32'	Report	António Oliveira 24'	Stadium: Estádio da Luz; Referee: Raúl Nazaré

8 November 1981 9	Belenenses	1–4	Benfica	Lisbon
19:30	Paulo Ferreira 60'	Report	César 20'; Reinaldo 34'; Nené 43', 49'	Stadium: Estádio do Restelo; Referee: César Correia

28 November 1981 10	Benfica	3–0	Académico de Viseu	Lisbon
19:00	Nené 28', 41'; Reinaldo 73'	Report		Stadium: Estádio da Luz; Referee: Amândio Silva

6 December 1981 11	Braga	1–3	Benfica	Braga
20:00	Chico Faria 65'	Report	João Alves 7'; Nené 57' (pen.); Valter 59' (o.g.)	Stadium: Estádio 1º de Maio; Referee: Veiga Trigo

13 December 1981 12	Benfica	2–1	Vitória de Setúbal	Lisbon
20:00	João Alves 7'; Reinaldo 90'	Report	Vítor Madeira 42'	Stadium: Estádio da Luz; Referee: César Correia

27 December 1981 13	Penafiel	0–3	Benfica	Penafiel
19:00		Report	Nené 45'; Jorge Gomes 52'; Humberto Coelho 75'	Stadium: Estádio Municipal 25 de Abril; Referee: Raúl Ribeiro

3 January 1982 14	Benfica	5–1	Espinho	Lisbon
19:00	João Alves 3'; Jorge Gomes 28'; José Luís 32'; Humberto Coelho 42'; Nené 86'	Report	Carvalho 81'	Stadium: Estádio da Luz; Referee: António Rodrigues

17 January 1982 15	Boavista	2–1	Benfica	Porto
20:30	João Bravo 35'; Rui Palhares 70'	Report	Reinaldo 27'	Stadium: Estádio do Bessa; Referee: Marques Pires

24 January 1982 16	Benfica	3–1	Porto	Lisbon
20:00	Nené 13', 72'; Humberto Coelho 64'	Report	Jacques 21'	Stadium: Estádio da Luz; Referee: Alder Dante

31 January 1982 17	Portimonense	1–1	Benfica	Portimão
19:00	Manoel 89'	Report	Shéu 72'	Stadium: Estádio Municipal de Portimão; Referee: António Garrido

7 February 1982 18	Benfica	3–0	União de Leiria	Lisbon
19:00	Filipovic 48'; Veloso 51'; Nené 89'	Report		Stadium: Estádio da Luz; Referee: Aventino Ferreira

12 February 1982 19	Vitória de Guimarães	1–0	Benfica	Guimarães
18:00	António Carraça 49'	Report		Stadium: Estádio D. Afonso Henriques; Referee: Raúl Ribeiro

28 February 1982 20	Benfica	2–1	Amora	Lisbon
19:00	Padinha 45'; Nené 46'	Report	Caio Cambalhota 4'	Stadium: Estádio da Luz; Referee: João Rosa

7 March 1982 21	Estoril Praia	0–0	Benfica	Estoril
18:00		Report		Stadium: Estádio António Coimbra da Mota; Referee: Albino Rodrigues

21 March 1982 22	Benfica	3–0	Rio Ave	Lisbon
19:00	Carlos Manuel 64'; Reinaldo 71'; Nené 82'	Report		Stadium: Estádio da Luz; Referee: António Garrido

28 March 1982 23	Sporting	3–1	Benfica	Lisbon
20:00	Rui Jordão 20' (pen.), 62' (pen.), 78'	Report	Carlos Manuel 13'; Bento (red card) 64'	Stadium: Estádio de Alvalade; Referee: Marques Pires

4 April 1982 24	Benfica	3–1	Belenenses	Lisbon
18:00	Nené 12', 80'; Humberto Coelho 65'	Report	Carlinhos 58'	Stadium: Estádio da Luz; Referee: Raúl Ribeiro

18 April 1982 25	Académico de Viseu	0–2	Benfica	Viseu
19:00		Report	Nené 66'; Filipovic 73'; Humberto Coelho (yellow card) 24' (yellow-red card) 85'	Stadium: Estádio do Fontelo; Referee: Veiga Trigo

25 April 1982 26	Benfica	3–0	Braga	Lisbon
19:00	Reinaldo 34'; Jorge Gomes 79'; Veloso 87'	Report		Stadium: Estádio da Luz; Referee: Albino Rodrigues

2 May 1982 27	Vitória de Setúbal	2–2	Benfica	Setúbal
18:00	Jorge Jesus 63'; Fernando Garcez 83'	Report	Reinaldo 14'; Nené 73'	Stadium: Estádio do Bonfim; Referee: Alder Dante

9 May 1982 28	Benfica	1–0	Penafiel	Lisbon
19:00	Reinaldo 82'	Report		Stadium: Estádio da Luz; Referee: Ezequiel Feijão

16 May 1982 28	Espinho	1–2	Benfica	Espinho
20:30	Mário Moinhos 9'	Report	Shéu 38'; Nené 45'	Stadium: Estádio Comendador Manuel Violas; Referee: Aventino Ferreira

23 May 1982 30	Benfica	2–0	Boavista	Lisbon
20:45	Jorge Gomes 3'; Nené 28'	Report		Stadium: Estádio da Luz; Referee: Amândio Silva

=== Taça de Portugal ===
22 November 1981 Second Rd	Mangualde	1–3	Benfica	Mangualde
17:00	Renato 89' (pen.)	Report	Nené 38' (pen.), 45'; João Alves 41'	Stadium: Campo Conde de Anadia; Referee: Azevedo Duarte

20 December 1981 Third Rd	Mogadourense	0–2	Benfica	Mogadouro
16:00		Report	Humberto Coelho 67'; Nené 85'	Stadium: Campo do Mogadourense; Referee: Adélio Pinto

10 January 1982 Fourth Rd	Portimonense	0–0 (a.e.t.)	Benfica	Portimão
16:00		Report		Stadium: Estádio Municipal; Referee: Veiga Trigo

13 January 1982 4R Replay	Benfica	1–0	Portimonense	Lisbon
18:00	Reinaldo 59'	Report		Stadium: Estádio da Luz; Referee: Santos Luís

20 February 1982 Round of 16	Benfica	6–0	Bragança	Lisbon
18:00	Nené 15', 41', 71', 76'; Filipovic 17'; Humberto Coelho 55'	Report		Stadium: Estádio da Luz; Referee: Ramiro Santiago

14 March 1982 Quarter-final	Porto	0–1 (a.e.t.)	Benfica	Porto
19:00		Report	Nené 93'	Stadium: Estádio das Antas; Referee: Alder Dante

10 April 1982 Semi-final	Braga	2–1	Benfica	Braga
19:00	Fontes 6', 64'	Report	Nené 23'	Stadium: Estádio 1º de Maio; Referee: Raúl Nazaré

=== European Cup ===
==== First round ====
16 September 1981 First leg	Benfica (Portugal)	3–0	(Cyprus) Omonia	Lisbon
21:00	Nené 52'; Filipovic 64'; Carlos Manuel 80'	Report		Stadium: Estádio da Luz; Attendance: 30,000; Referee: Anthony Mangion

30 September 1981 Second leg	Omonia (Cyprus)	0–1 (0–4 agg.)	(Portugal) Benfica	Nicosia
20:30		Report	Chalana 75'	Stadium: Makario Stadium; Attendance: 12,000; Referee: Stjepan Glavina

==== Second round ====
21 October 1981 First leg	Benfica (Portugal)	0–0	(West Germany) Bayern Munich	Lisbon
21:00		Report		Stadium: Estádio da Luz; Attendance: 40,000; Referee: Michel Vautrot

4 November 1981 Second leg	Bayern Munich (West Germany)	4–1 (4–1 agg.)	(Portugal) Benfica	Munich
20:00	Hoeneß 28', 36', 55'; Breitner 82'	Report	Nené 62'	Stadium: Olympiastadion; Attendance: 50,000; Referee: Paolo Casarin

=== Friendlies ===
4 August 1981	Benfica	0–0	Boavista	Lisbon
				Stadium: Estádio da Luz; Attendance: 30,000; Referee: Alfredo Basílio

6 August 1981 Lisbon TM	Benfica	0–3	Hungary	Lisbon
			Csapó 3'; Nyilasi 40', 85'	Stadium: Estádio da Luz; Referee: Vítor Correia

8 August 1981 Lisbon TM	Sporting	2–0	Benfica	Lisbon
21:30	Manuel Fernandes 42', 58'			Stadium: Estádio de Alvalade; Referee: Marques Pires

12 August 1981	LASA XI	1–4	Benfica	New Bedford
20:00	Mesquita 74'		Nené 25' (pen.); Carlos Manuel 30'; Chalana 38'; César 57'	Stadium: Sargeant Field

15 August 1981 Toronto TM	Benfica	6–0	Toronto Italia	Toronto
	João Alves 19', 32'; Humberto Coelho 53'; Veloso 55'; Filipovic 57'; Nené 60'			Referee: Bill Coppins

16 August 1981 Toronto TM	Benfica	1–0	Leeds United	Toronto
	Nené 80' (pen.)			Referee: Tony Evangelista

26 August 1981	Santarém XI	0–6	Benfica	Golegã
				Referee: Raúl Nazaré

8 September 1981	Benfica	2–0	Kuwait	Lisbon
	Nené 21'; Carlos Manuel 42'			Stadium: Estádio da Luz; Referee: António Ferreira

4 October 1981 Taça de Honra	Belenenses	1–1 (1–4 p)	Benfica	Lisbon
	Djão		César	Stadium: Estádio do Restelo
	Penalties
	Eurico (penalty scored); Sambinha (penalty missed); Tó Zé (penalty missed)		(penalty scored) Paulo Campos; (penalty scored) José Luís; (penalty scored) António Veloso; (penalty scored) Reinaldo

11 October 1981 Taça de Honra	Estoril Praia	0–1	Benfica	Lisbon
			Carlos Pereira	Stadium: Estádio do Restelo

23 February 1982 78th Anniversary	Benfica	4–1	Club Brugge	Lisbon
	Pietra 9'; Humberto Coelho 19'; Filipovic 55'; Nené 68'		João Alves 1' (o.g.)	Stadium: Estádio da Luz; Attendance: 15,000; Referee: Lopes Martins

14 April 1982	Algeria	1–0	Benfica	Algiers
	Yahi 60'			Stadium: July 5, 1962 Stadium; Attendance: 12,000

26 May 1982	Argentina	1–0	Benfica	Buenos Aires
	Mario Kempes 48'			Stadium: Estadio Monumental Antonio Vespucio Liberti

== Player statistics ==
The squad for the season consisted of the players listed in the tables below, as well as staff member Lajos Baróti (manager), Toni (assistant manager), Júlio Borges (Director of Football).

Note 1: Note: Flags indicate national team as defined under FIFA eligibility rules. Players may hold more than one non-FIFA nationality.

Note 2: Players with squad numbers marked ‡ joined the club during the 1981-82 season via transfer, with more details in the following section.

No.	Pos	Nat	Player	Total		Primeira Divisão		Taça de Portugal		European Cup		Supertaça	
No.	Pos	Nat	Player	Apps	Goals	Apps	Goals	Apps	Goals	Apps	Goals	Apps	Goals
1	GK	(Portugal) POR	Manuel Bento	40	0	28	0	7	0	3	0	2	0
1	GK	(Portugal) POR	António Botelho	2	0	1	0	0	0	1	0	0	0
2	DF	(Portugal) POR	Minervino Pietra	20	1	14	1	3	0	3	0	0	0
2	DF	(Portugal) POR	António Veloso	37	2	26	2	6	0	3	0	2	0
3	DF	(Portugal) POR	Humberto Coelho	36	7	26	5	6	2	3	0	1	0
3^{‡}	DF	(Portugal) POR	Álvaro Magalhães	17	0	11	0	3	0	1	0	2	0
4	DF	(Portugal) POR	João Laranjeira	9	0	8	0	0	0	1	0	0	0
4	DF	(Portugal) POR	Frederico Rosa	23	0	16	0	3	0	4	0	0	0
4	DF	(Portugal) POR	Alberto Bastos Lopes	7	0	4	0	1	0	1	0	1	0
5	DF	(Portugal) POR	António Bastos Lopes	37	0	25	0	7	0	3	0	2	0
5	DF	(Portugal) POR	Carlos Pereira	1	0	1	0	0	0	0	0	0	0
6	MF	(Portugal) POR	José Luís	32	1	23	1	5	0	2	0	2	0
6	MF	(Portugal) POR	Carlos Manuel	30	3	22	2	5	0	3	1	0	0
6	MF	(Portugal) POR	João Alves	22	4	14	3	5	1	1	0	2	0
7	FW	(Portugal) POR	Nené	43	37	30	24	7	9	4	2	2	2
7^{‡}	FW	(Portugal) POR	Fernando Folha	13	0	8	0	2	0	3	0	0	0
8	FW	(Portugal) POR	Reinaldo Gomes	26	9	17	8	5	1	3	0	1	0
9	FW	(Brazil) BRA	Jorge Gomes	30	5	21	4	6	0	1	0	2	1
9	FW	(Brazil) BRA	César Oliveira	17	1	11	1	1	0	4	0	1	0
9^{‡}	FW	(Socialist Federal Republic of Yugoslavia) YUG	Zoran Filipovic	27	7	22	5	2	1	3	1	0	0
9	FW	(Portugal) POR	Paulo Padinha	5	0	4	0	1	0	0	0	0	0
9^{‡}	FW	(Brazil) BRA	Paulo Campos	6	0	5	0	1	0	0	0	0	0
10	MF	(Portugal) POR	Fernando Chalana	31	1	21	0	6	0	2	1	2	0
11	MF	(Portugal) POR	Shéu	41	2	29	2	7	0	3	0	2	0
11	MF	(Portugal) POR	Carlos Manuel II	1	0	0	0	1	0	0	0	0	0
12	GK	(Portugal) POR	Jorge Martins	2	0	2	0	0	0	0	0	0	0

== Transfers ==
=== In ===
Entry date	Position	Player	From club	Fee	Ref
21 April 1981	FW	Fernando Folha	Boavista	Undisclosed	
10 July 1981	FW	Zoran Filipovic	Club Brugge	Undisclosed	
28 July 1981	DF	Álvaro Magalhães	Académica de Coimbra	Undisclosed	
22 August 1981	FW	Paulo Campos	Portimonense	Undisclosed	

=== Out ===
Exit date	Position	Player	To club	Fee	Ref
21 April 1981	FW	Jorge Silva	Boavista	Free	
26 May 1981	MF	Toni	None	Retired	
3 September 1981	DF	Carlos Alhinho	Portimonense	Free	

=== Out by loan ===
Exit date	Position	Player	To club	Return date	Ref
15 July 1981	MF	Diamantino Miranda	Boavista	30 June 1982	
5 August 1981	FW	Francisco Vital	Boavista	30 June 1982	
8 August 1981	FW	Joel Almeida	Académico de Viseu	30 June 1982	
