= List of Sporting CP managers =

The following is a list of Sporting CP managers.

== List ==
As of match played 1 Nov 2026

Name	Nat.	From	To	P	W	D	L	GF	GA	Win%	Honours	Notes
Francisco Stromp	(Portugal)	1 November 1916	1 April 1917	6	4	1	1	21	4	66.67		
Charlie Bell	(Scotland)	1 November 1919	29 January 1922	23	13	5	5	46	25	56.52	Lisbon Championship	
Augusto Sabbo	(Germany)	27 November 1922	14 January 1924	17	13	3	1	43	15	76.47	1922–23 Campeonato de Portugal (*extinct)	
Julius Lelovtic	(Hungary)	15 March 1925	28 March 1926	37	23	5	9	79	40	62.16		
Augusto Sabbo	(Germany)	1 October 1926	16 January 1927	7	4	1	2	14	7	57.14		
Filipe dos Santos	(Portugal)	1 October 1927	30 June 1928	7	6	1	0	20	5	85.71	Lisbon Championship	
Charlie Bell	(Scotland)	1 October 1928	1 May 1930	37	20	6	11	88	51	54.05		
Filipe dos Santos	(Portugal)	1 October 1930	15 March 1931	13	11	1	1	39	8	84.62	Lisbon Championship	
Arthur John	(England)	13 December 1931	22 May 1932	15	9	2	4	43	30	60.00		
Rudolf Jeny	(Hungary)	1 October 1932	1 July 1934	42	26	9	7	109	46	61.90	1933–34 Campeonato de Portugal (*extinct)	
Filipe dos Santos	(Portugal)	8 July 1934	30 June 1935	33	20	7	6	97	43	60.61	Lisbon Championship	
Wilhelm Possak	(Romania)	27 October 1935	28 February 1937	46	32	6	8	142	66	69.57	Lisbon Championship (2 titles), 1935–36 Campeonato de Portugal (*extinct)	
József Szabó	(Hungary)	7 March 1937	23 April 1944	234	180	19	35	975	345	76.92	Primeira Liga (2 titles: 1940–41, 1943–44), 1940–41 Taça de Portugal and 1937–38 Campeonato de Portugal (*extinct)	
Joaquim Ferreira	(Portugal)	1 September 1944	1 July 1945	35	26	4	5	104	60	74.29	1944–45 Taça de Portugal	
Cândido de Oliveira	(Portugal)	1 September 1945	30 June 1946	36	25	3	8	123	62	69.44	1945–46 Taça de Portugal	
Bob Kelly	(England)	1 September 1946	30 June 1947	35	29	3	3	154	57	82.86	1946–47 Primeira Liga	
Cândido de Oliveira	(Portugal)	1 September 1947	17 April 1949	58	45	3	10	216	82	77.59	Primeira Liga (2 titles: 1947–48 and 1948–49) and 1947–48 Taça de Portugal	
Sándor Peics	(Hungary)	1 September 1949	7 May 1950	26	19	1	6	91	35	73.08		
Randolph Galloway	(England)	1 September 1950	31 May 1953	95	67	14	14	296	113	70.53	Primeira Liga (3 titles)	
Álvaro Cardoso	(Portugal)	13 July 1953	19 July 1953	3	1	1	1	3	4	33.33		
József Szabó	(Hungary)	1 September 1953	30 June 1954	34	25	4	5	104	40	73.53	1953–54 Primeira Liga and 1953–54 Taça de Portugal	
Alejandro Scopelli	(Argentina)	1 September 1954	12 April 1956	26	17	6	3	77	28	65.38		
Tavares da Silva	(Portugal)	7 November 1954	7 November 1954	1	0	0	1	0	1	0.00		
Abel Picabéa	(Argentina)	2 May 1956	28 April 1957	32	14	8	10	71	37	43.75		
Enrique Fernández	(Uruguay)	1 September 1957	13 July 1959	68	39	15	14	157	73	57.35	1957–58 Primeira Liga	
Fernando Vaz	(Portugal)	1 September 1959	3 June 1960	37	26	6	5	114	32	70.27		
Mário Imbelloni	(Argentina)	24 May 1960	24 May 1960	1	0	0	1	1	3	0.00		
Alfredo Gonzalez	(Argentina)	6 June 1960	12 March 1961	28	20	3	5	65	20	71.43		
Otto Glória	(Brazil)	4 April 1961	24 September 1961	12	7	4	1	32	14	58.33		
Juca	(Portugal)	25 September 1961	30 June 1963	79	57	8	14	225	78	72.15	1961–62 Primeira Liga and 1962–63 Taça de Portugal	
Gentil Cardoso	(Brazil)	1 September 1963	8 March 1964	29	17	6	6	78	32	58.62		
Anselmo Fernandez	(Portugal)	15 March 1964	30 June 1964	13	4	6	3	20	15	30.77	1963–64 European Cup Winners' Cup	
Jean Luciano	(France)	1 September 1964	15 December 1964	13	5	3	5	22	17	38.46		
Juca	(Portugal)	20 December 1964	27 December 1964	4	2	1	1	3	2	50.00		
Anselmo Fernandez	(Portugal)	1 January 1965	15 February 1965	8	5	2	1	15	11	62.50		
Armando Ferreira	(Portugal)	7 March 1965	30 June 1965	15	6	7	2	28	17	40.00		
Otto Glória	(Brazil)	1 September 1965	30 June 1966	40	25	9	6	91	34	62.50	1965–66 Primeira Liga	
Juca	(Portugal)	6 October 1965	6 October 1965	1	1	0	0	6	1	100.00		
Fernando Argila	(Spain)	1 September 1966	19 February 1967	20	4	7	9	22	30	20.00		
Armando Ferreira	(Portugal)	26 February 1967	30 June 1967	10	7	2	1	15	3	70.00		
Fernando Caiado	(Portugal)	1 July 1967	17 November 1968	52	27	14	11	84	47	51.92		
Mário Lino	(Portugal)	24 November 1968	24 November 1968	1	0	0	1	0	1	0.00		
Armando Ferreira	(Portugal)	1 December 1968	15 May 1969	21	11	4	6	41	17	52.38		
Fernando Vaz	(Portugal)	28 May 1969	6 February 1972	100	66	21	13	229	74	66.00	1969–70 Primeira Liga and 1970–71 Taça de Portugal	
Mário Lino	(Portugal)	7 February 1972	30 June 1972	17	10	5	2	34	19	58.82		
Ronnie Allen	(England)	1 July 1972	15 April 1973	29	15	6	8	59	34	51.72		
Mário Lino	(Portugal)	16 April 1973	6 June 1974	50	36	7	7	131	39	72.00	1972–73 Taça de Portugal and 1973–74 Primeira Liga	
Osvaldo Silva	(Brazil)	7 June 1974	30 June 1974	1	1	0	0	2	1	100.00	1973–74 Taça de Portugal	
Alfredo di Stéfano	(Argentina)	1 July 1974	9 September 1974	1	0	0	1	0	1	0.00		
Osvaldo Silva	(Brazil)	14 September 1974	15 December 1974	13	6	5	2	21	12	46.15		
Fernando Riera	(Chile)	22 December 1974	30 June 1975	23	14	6	3	50	17	60.87		
Juca	(Portugal)	1 July 1975	30 June 1976	42	23	7	12	73	41	54.76		
Jimmy Hagan	(England)	1 July 1976	30 June 1977	41	23	10	8	85	45	56.10		
Paulo Emílio	(Brazil)	1 July 1977	28 December 1977	16	9	3	4	44	18	56.25		
José Rodrigues Dias	(Portugal)	7 January 1978	30 June 1978	25	17	3	5	43	22	68.00	1977–78 Taça de Portugal	
Milorad Pavić	(Socialist Federal Republic of Yugoslavia)	1 July 1978	30 June 1979	40	23	9	8	59	27	57.50		
José Rodrigues Dias	(Portugal)	1 July 1979	18 November 1979	14	7	3	4	25	14	50.00		
Fernando Mendes	(Portugal)	25 November 1979	7 December 1980	44	26	11	7	85	34	59.09	1979–80 Primeira Liga and 1980 Supertaça Cândido de Oliveira	
Srećko Radišić	(Socialist Federal Republic of Yugoslavia)	21 December 1980	30 June 1981	18	9	4	5	28	18	50.00		
Malcolm Allison	(England)	1 July 1981	18 August 1982	43	29	10	4	99	33	67.44	1981–82 Primeira Liga and 1981–82 Taça de Portugal	
António Oliveira	(Portugal)	19 August 1982	11 April 1983	38	22	7	9	69	35	57.89	1982 Supertaça Cândido de Oliveira	
Jozef Vengloš	(Czechoslovakia)	12 April 1983	28 April 1984	44	28	6	10	87	40	63.64		
Marinho	(Portugal)	29 April 1984	30 June 1984	2	1	1	0	5	1	50.00		
John Toshack	(Wales)	1 July 1984	19 May 1985	40	25	12	3	88	31	62.50		
Pedro Gomes	(Portugal)	19 May 1985	30 June 1985	2	1	0	1	5	3	50.00		
Manuel José	(Portugal)	1 July 1985	11 January 1987	68	42	11	15	139	45	61.76		
Marinho	(Portugal)	12 January 1987	29 January 1987	2	0	2	0	1	1	0.00		
Keith Burkinshaw	(England)	30 January 1987	31 January 1988	39	19	10	10	69	39	48.72	1987 Supertaça Cândido de Oliveira	
António Morais	(Portugal)	1 February 1988	30 June 1988	22	10	7	5	37	25	45.45		
Pedro Rocha	(Uruguay)	1 July 1988	18 February 1989	31	16	9	6	60	24	51.61		
Vítor Damas	(Portugal)	19 February 1989	12 March 1989	3	1	0	2	6	2	33.33		
Manuel José	(Portugal)	13 March 1989	10 December 1989	28	15	5	8	36	25	53.57		
Vítor Damas	(Portugal)	11 December 1989	24 December 1989	2	1	1	0	1	0	50.00		
Raul Águas	(Portugal)	25 December 1989	30 June 1990	21	9	9	3	27	17	42.86		
Marinho Peres	(Brazil)	1 July 1990	8 March 1992	80	47	16	17	128	57	58.75		
António Dominguez	(Portugal)	9 March 1992	30 June 1992	9	4	3	2	14	6	44.44		
Bobby Robson	(England)	1 July 1992	7 December 1993	59	34	13	12	101	51	57.63		
Carlos Queiroz	(Portugal)	8 December 1993	25 February 1996	105	68	24	13	209	78	64.76	1994–95 Taça de Portugal	
Fernando Mendes	(Portugal)	26 February 1996	31 March 1996	5	1	3	1	10	6	20.00		
Octávio Machado	(Portugal)	1 April 1996	30 June 1996	10	6	3	1	18	8	60.00	1995 Supertaça Cândido de Oliveira	
Robert Waseige	(Belgium)	1 July 1996	1 December 1996	16	9	3	4	19	11	56.25		
Octávio Machado	(Portugal)	2 December 1996	1 November 1997	41	26	9	6	67	23	63.41		
Francisco Vital	(Portugal)	2 November 1997	6 December 1997	7	2	2	3	11	11	28.57		
Vicente Cantatore	(Argentina)	7 December 1997	21 December 1997	3	2	0	1	3	3	66.67		
Carlos Manuel	(Portugal)	1 January 1998	30 June 1998	22	10	6	6	35	27	45.45		
Mirko Jozić	(Croatia)	1 July 1998	30 June 1999	37	17	12	8	67	39	45.95		
Giuseppe Materazzi	(Italy)	1 July 1999	25 September 1999	6	2	3	1	9	8	33.33		
Augusto Inácio	(Portugal)	26 September 1999	3 December 2000	58	36	11	11	91	50	62.07	1999–2000 Primeira Liga	
Fernando Mendes	(Portugal)	4 December 2000	21 January 2001	7	4	2	1	14	8	57.14		
Manuel Fernandes	(Portugal)	22 January 2001	30 June 2001	21	11	3	7	33	23	52.38	2000 Supertaça Cândido de Oliveira	
László Bölöni	(Romania)	1 July 2001	30 June 2003	90	53	21	16	179	86	58.89	2001–02 Primeira Liga, 2001–02 Taça de Portugal and 2002 Supertaça Cândido de Oliveira	
Fernando Santos	(Portugal)	1 July 2003	30 June 2004	40	26	5	9	66	38	65.00		
José Peseiro	(Portugal)	1 July 2004	18 October 2005	63	34	10	19	118	74	53.97	2004–05 UEFA Cup Runner-up	
Paulo Bento	(Portugal)	19 October 2005	6 November 2009	194	117	46	31	311	152	60.31	2006–07 Taça de Portugal, 2007–08 Taça de Portugal, 2007 Supertaça Cândido de Oliveira and 2008 Supertaça Cândido de Oliveira	
Leonel Pontes	(Portugal)	7 November 2009	15 November 2009	1	0	1	0	2	2	0.00		
Carlos Carvalhal	(Portugal)	16 November 2009	9 May 2010	33	16	7	10	53	37	48.48		
Paulo Sérgio	(Portugal)	14 May 2010	25 February 2011	38	20	8	10	66	41	52.63		
Alberto Cabral	(Portugal)	26 February 2011	28 February 2011	1	0	0	1	0	1	0.00		
José Couceiro	(Portugal)	28 February 2011	30 June 2011	10	4	3	3	10	8	40.00		
Domingos Paciência	(Portugal)	1 July 2011	13 February 2012	35	19	9	7	55	27	54.29		
Ricardo Sá Pinto	(Portugal)	14 February 2012	4 October 2012	30	15	7	8	41	31	50.00		
Oceano da Cruz	(Portugal)	5 October 2012	29 October 2012	4	0	1	3	3	7	0.00		
Franky Vercauteren	(Belgium)	30 October 2012	7 January 2013	11	2	4	5	11	19	18.18		
Jesualdo Ferreira	(Portugal)	8 January 2013	19 May 2013	18	10	3	5	26	20	55.56		
Leonardo Jardim	(Portugal)	20 May 2013	20 May 2014	35	23	8	4	77	28	65.71		
Marco Silva	(Portugal)	21 May 2014	4 June 2015	53	31	15	7	105	54	58.49	2014–15 Taça de Portugal	
Jorge Jesus	(Portugal)	5 June 2015	5 June 2018	158	99	26	33	302	146	62.66	2015 Supertaça Cândido de Oliveira and 2017–18 Taça da Liga	
José Peseiro	(Portugal)	1 July 2018	1 November 2018	14	9	1	4	24	14	64.29		
Tiago Fernandes	(Portugal)	2 November 2018	11 November 2018	3	2	1	0	4	2	66.67		
Marcel Keizer	(Netherlands)	12 November 2018	5 September 2019	42	25	9	8	93	47	59.52	2018–19 Taça da Liga and 2018–19 Taça de Portugal	
Leonel Pontes	(Portugal)	5 September 2019	26 September 2019	4	0	1	3	5	8	0.00		
Silas	(Portugal)	27 September 2019	4 March 2020	28	17	1	10	45	32	60.71		
Ruben Amorim	(Portugal)	4 March 2020	10 November 2024	231	165	33	33	515	202	71.43	2020–21 Taça da Liga, 2021–22 Taça da Liga, 2020–21 Primeira Liga, 2023–24 Primeira Liga and 2021 Supertaça Cândido de Oliveira	
João Pereira	(Portugal)	11 November 2024	26 December 2024	8	3	1	4	14	13	37.50		
Rui Borges	(Portugal)	26 December 2024	1 November 2026	99	64	22	13	220	93	64.65	2024–25 Primeira Liga, 2024–25 Taça de Portugal	
Tiago Fernandes	(Portugal)	1 November 2026	4 November 2026	1	1	0	0	1	0	100.00		
Paulo Fonseca	(Portugal)	4 November 2026	Present	0	0	0	0	0	0	—		

Table key

- Caretaker coach (coach who assumed temporarily the job in the absence of the incumbent head coach or until a new head coach was hired)
