= 1981 Supertaça Cândido de Oliveira =

- Event: Supertaça Cândido de Oliveira (Portuguese Super Cup)
Benfica	Porto
3	4

First leg
Benfica	Porto
2	0
- Date: 1 December 1981
- Venue: Estádio da Luz, Lisbon
- Referee: António Garrido (Leiria)

Second leg
Porto	Benfica
4	1
- Date: 8 December 1981
- Venue: Estádio das Antas, Porto
- Referee: Alder Dante (Santarém)

The 1981 Supertaça Cândido de Oliveira was the 3rd edition of the Supertaça Cândido de Oliveira, the annual Portuguese football season-opening match contested by the winners of the previous season's top league and cup competitions (or cup runner-up in case the league- and cup-winning club is the same). The 1981 Supertaça Cândido de Oliveira was contested over two legs, and opposed Benfica and Porto of the Primeira Liga. Benfica qualified for the SuperCup by winning both the 1980–81 Primeira Divisão and the 1980–81 Taça de Portugal, whilst Porto qualified for the Supertaça as the cup runner-up.

The first leg which took place at the Estádio da Luz, saw a comfortable Benfica 2–0 win. The second leg which took place at the Estádio das Antas saw Porto defeat Benfica 4–1 (4–3 on aggregate), which granted the Dragões their first Supertaça.

== First leg ==
=== Details ===
1 December 1981

Benfica	2–0	Porto
Nené 7', 29'

Estádio da Luz, Lisbon
Referee: António Garrido (Leiria)

Benfica	Porto

GK	1	(Portugal) Manuel Bento
DF	(Portugal) António Veloso
DF	(Portugal) Álvaro Magalhães
DF	(Portugal) Alberto Bastos Lopes	Booked
DF	(Portugal) Humberto Coelho	Booked
MF	(Portugal) Shéu
MF	(Portugal) João Alves	(substituted off) 78'
MF	(Portugal) José Luís
MF	(Portugal) Fernando Chalana
FW	(Portugal) Reinaldo Gomes
FW	(Portugal) Nené (c)	(substituted off) 38'
Substitutes:
MF	(Brazil) César	(substituted on) 38'
MF	(Brazil) Jorge Gomes	(substituted on) 78'
Manager:
(Hungary) Lajos Baróti

GK	1	(Portugal) João Fonseca
DF	(Portugal) Gabriel Mendes
DF	(Portugal) Carlos Simões (c)
DF	(Portugal) Fernando Freitas	Booked
MF	(Portugal) António Sousa	(substituted off) 46'
MF	(Portugal) Adelino Teixeira	(substituted off) 70'
MF	(Portugal) Romeu Silva	Booked
FW	(Portugal) Albertino Pereira
FW	(Republic of Ireland) Mickey Walsh
FW	(Portugal) Jacques Pereira
FW	(Portugal) José Alberto Costa
Substitutes:
DF	(Portugal) António Lima Pereira	(substituted on) 46'
DF	(Portugal) João Pinto	(substituted on) 70'
Manager:
(Austria) Hermann Stessl

Match officials

- Assistant referees:
- Fourth official:

Match rules

- 90 minutes.
- Maximum of two substitutions

== Second leg ==
=== Details ===
8 December 1981

Porto	4–1	Benfica
Jacques 27', 65', 70'; Alberto Costa 79'		J. Gomes 58'

Estádio das Antas, Porto
Referee: Alder Dante (Santarém)

Porto	Benfica

GK	1	(Portugal) João Fonseca
DF	(Portugal) Gabriel Mendes
DF	(Portugal) Carlos Simões (c)
DF	(Portugal) António Lima Pereira
DF	(Portugal) Fernando Freitas	(yellow card) 76'
MF	(Portugal) Jaime Pacheco	(substituted off) 46'
MF	(Portugal) Romeu Silva
MF	(Portugal) Jaime Magalhães	(substituted off) 87'
FW	(Portugal) Jacques Pereira
FW	(Republic of Ireland) Mickey Walsh
FW	(Portugal) José Alberto Costa	(yellow card) 48'
Substitutes:
DF	(Portugal) João Pinto	(yellow card) 46'	(substituted on) 46'
FW	(Portugal) Júlio Carlos	(substituted on) 87'
Manager:
(Austria) Hermann Stessl

GK	1	(Portugal) Manuel Bento
DF	(Portugal) António Bastos Lopes	(yellow card) 48'
DF	(Portugal) António Veloso
DF	(Portugal) Álvaro Magalhães
DF	(Portugal) Alberto Bastos Lopes	(yellow card) 63'
MF	(Portugal) Shéu
MF	(Portugal) José Luís
MF	(Portugal) João Alves
MF	(Portugal) Fernando Chalana
FW	(Portugal) Nené (c)
FW	(Brazil) Jorge Gomes
Substitutes:
Manager:
(Hungary) Lajos Baróti

Match officials

- Assistant referees:
- Fourth official:

Match rules

- 90 minutes.
- Maximum of two substitutions

1981 Supertaça Cândido de Oliveira Winners
Porto
1st Title

== See also ==
- O Clássico
- 1981–82 Primeira Divisão
- 1981–82 S.L. Benfica season
