= 1977 Taça de Portugal final =

Association football match

- Event: 1976–77 Taça de Portugal
Braga	Porto
0	1
- Date: 18 May 1977
- Venue: Estádio das Antas, Porto
- Referee: Porem Luís (Leiria)

The 1977 Taça de Portugal final was the final match of the 1976–77 Taça de Portugal, the 37th season of the Taça de Portugal, the premier Portuguese football cup competition organized by the Portuguese Football Federation (FPF). The match was played on 18 May 1977 at the Estádio das Antas in Porto, and opposed two Primeira Liga sides: Braga and Porto. Porto defeated Braga 1–0 to claim the Taça de Portugal for a fourth time.

== Match ==
=== Details ===
18 May 1977

Braga	0–1	Porto
		Gomes 54'

Estádio das Antas, Porto
Referee: Porem Luís (Leiria)

Braga	Porto

GK	1	(Portugal) António Fidalgo
DF	(Portugal) Artur Correia
DF	(Portugal) Marinho
DF	(Portugal) Serra
DF	(Brazil) Ronaldo Brito
MF	(Portugal) Manaca	(substituted off) 54'
MF	(Argentina) Edgar Beck	(substituted off) 46'
MF	(Portugal) António Pinto (c)
MF	(Portugal) Paulo Rocha
FW	(Portugal) Chico Gordo
FW	(Portugal) Chico Faria
Substitutes:
DF	(Portugal) Fernando Martins	(substituted on) 54'
FW	(Brazil) Caio Cambalhota	(substituted on) 46'
Manager:
(Portugal) Mário Lino

GK	1	(Portugal) Joaquim Torres
DF	(Portugal) Gabriel
DF	(Portugal) Carlos Simões
DF	(Portugal) Alfredo Murça
DF	(Portugal) António Taí	(substituted off) 46'
MF	(Portugal) Octávio Machado
MF	(Portugal) Rodolfo Reis
MF	(Portugal) Fernando Freitas
MF	(Portugal) António Oliveira (c)
FW	(Brazil) Duda	(substituted off) 74'
FW	(Portugal) Fernando Gomes
Substitutes:
MF	(Portugal) Celso de Matos	(substituted on) 74'
FW	(Portugal) Seninho	(substituted on) 46'
Manager:
(Portugal) José Maria Pedroto

1976–77 Taça de Portugal Winners
Porto
4th Title

Match officials

- Assistant referees:
- Fourth official:

Match rules

- 90 minutes.
- 30 minutes of extra time if necessary.
- Maximum of two substitutions
