= José Rodrigues Dias =

Portuguese football manager (1924–2007)

Personal information
- Date of birth: 7 October 1924
- Place of birth: Almada, Portugal
- Date of death: 27 September 2007 (aged 82)
- Place of death: Queijas, Portugal
- Position: Goalkeeper

Senior career*
Years	Team	Apps	(Gls)
- Sintrense

Managerial career
- 1970–1971: Varzim
- 1971: Marítimo
- 1978: Sporting CP
- 1979: Sporting CP
- 1980: Beira-Mar
- 1980–1981: Vitória Setúbal
- 1981–1982: Belenenses
- 1993–1994: Lusitano VRSA
- * Club domestic league appearances and goals

José Rodrigues Dias (7 October 1924 – 27 September 2007) was a Portuguese football manager. He had two spells as manager of Sporting CP, winning the Taça de Portugal in 1978 and managing the first third of the 1979–80 winning season in the Primeira Liga.

== Career ==
Born in Almada, Rodrigues Dias played football as a goalkeeper for Sintrense, with little impact. He then trained as a physical education instructor and worked with the Portuguese Football Federation's youth and senior teams.

In January 1978, Brazilian manager Paulo Emílio was sacked by Sporting CP for returning to his country for Christmas without permission, and Rodrigues Dias was appointed in his place; players said that there was little change as he had already been involved in training the team. He inherited a team that were third in the Primeira Liga and finished the season there. In the Taça de Portugal, he led them to the final, the first of five to go to a replay; he defeated José Maria Pedroto's Porto 2–1. During his time at the Estádio José Alvalade, the team were known for the attacking partnership of Manuel Fernandes and Rui Jordão.

Sporting president João Rocha appointed Yugoslav Milorad Pavić in June 1978, keeping Rodrigues Dias as assistant and trainer. Having finished third and lost the cup final, Pavić left by mutual accord and Rodrigues Dias was put back in charge for 1979–80.

In November 1979, Sporting lost away to Benfica and were eliminated from the UEFA Cup by 1. FC Kaiserslautern in the space of three days. Rodrigues Dias was sacked and replaced by Fernando Mendes, who ended the season with a league title.

Rodrigues Dias later managed Beira-Mar, Vitória de Setúbal and Belenenses. He died aged 82 on 27 September 2007, in Queijas.
