= Augusto Matine =

Mozambican-born Portuguese footballer (1947–2020)

Personal information
- Full name: Augusto Matine
- Date of birth: 13 February 1947
- Place of birth: Lourenço Marques, Mozambique
- Date of death: 13 October 2020 (aged 73)
- Place of death: Maputo, Mozambique
- Position: Midfielder

Senior career*
Years	Team	Apps	(Gls)
–1967	Central Lourenço Marques		
1967–1971	Benfica	23	(0)
1971–1972	→ Vitória Setúbal (loan)	28	(0)
1972–1973	Benfica	8	(0)
1973–1976	Vitória Setúbal	84	(5)
1976–1977	Portimonense	25	(2)
1977–1978	Lusitano Évora		
1978–1979	Aves		
1979–1981	Estrela Amadora	31	(2)
1981–1983	Torralta		
Total		199	(9)

International career
1970–1973	Portugal	9	(0)

Managerial career
- Estrela Amadora (assistant, scout)
- 2001–2002: Mozambique
- 2003: Ferroviário Maputo
- 2012: Desportivo Maputo
- * Club domestic league appearances and goals

Augusto Matine (13 February 1947 – 13 October 2020) was a Portuguese footballer and manager who played as a midfielder mostly for Benfica and Vitória de Setúbal at club level and nine times for the Portugal national team. Most notably, he managed the Mozambique national team.

== Club career ==
Born in Lourenço Marques (now Maputo), Matine, a midfielder, joined Benfica in Lisbon from Central de Lourenço Marques in 1967. After playing two seasons for Benfica's main squad, with whom he won the 1969–70 Taça de Portugal and the 1970–71 Primeira Divisão, he spent one year on loan at Vitória de Setúbal. He returned to Benfica the next season and won the 1972–73 Primeira Divisão and the Taça de Honra before leaving permanently to Vitória de Setúbal, where he would play from 1973 to 1976. He then represented Portimonense, Lusitano de Évora and Desportivo das Aves for a season each, and lastly Estrela da Amadora and Torralta for two seasons each.

== International career ==
Internationally, Matine gained nine caps for Portugal. He made his debut on 10 May 1970 in Lisbon against Italy, in a 1–2 defeat, and played his last match for the country in 1973.

== Manager career ==
After retiring as a player in 1986, Matine became a football manager. He was an assistant coach and scout for Estrela da Amadora and later managed the Mozambique national team from 2001 to 2002. Moreover, he was appointed manager of home town clubs Ferroviário de Maputo, in 2003, and Desportivo de Maputo, until May 2012.

== Death ==
Matine died in Maputo on 13 October 2020, aged 73.

== Honours ==
Benfica

- Primeira Liga: 1970–71, 1972–73
- Taça de Portugal: 1969–70
- Taça de Honra: 1972–73
