= Joaquim Murça =

Portuguese footballer

Personal information
- Full name: Joaquim Fernando Ferreira Murça
- Date of birth: 7 October 1954 (age 72)
- Place of birth: Costa da Caparica, Portugal
- Position: Left back

Youth career
- Pescadores

Senior career*
Years	Team	Apps	(Gls)
1976–1977	Barreirense		
1977–1979	Sporting CP	10	(0)
1979–1983	Portimonense	102	(6)
1983–1984	Vitória Guimarães	19	(3)
1984–1988	Belenenses	67	(3)
1988–1989	Gil Vicente		
1989–1990	Loures		
Total		198	(12)

International career
1982–1983	Portugal	2	(0)
- * Club domestic league appearances and goals

Joaquim Fernando Ferreira Murça (born 7 October 1954 in Costa da Caparica) is a Portuguese retired footballer who played as a left back.

After retiring he was a coach in Belenenses, among others under manager Carlos Carvalhal. He left the club in 2011 following controversy.

== Personal ==
He is the younger brother of Alfredo Murça.
