= Filipe dos Santos =

Portuguese footballer

Personal information
- Full name: Joaquim Filipe dos Santos
- Date of birth: 1896
- Place of birth: Setúbal, Portugal
- Date of death: 28 January 1941 (aged 44–45)
- Position: Midfielder

Senior career*
| Years | Team | Apps | (Gls) |
| 1917–1921 | Vitória Setúbal | | |
| 1921–1930 | Sporting | | |

International career
| 1923 | Portugal | 1 | (0) |

Managerial career
- 1927–1928: Sporting
- 1930–1931: Sporting
- 1934–1935: Sporting
- * Club domestic league appearances and goals

Joaquim Filipe dos Santos (1896 – 28 January 1941) was a Portuguese footballer who played as a midfielder.

== Biography ==
Filipe dos Santos started by playing in small clubs such as Cruz Quebrada and Avenida, until he reached Vitória de Setúbal in 1919, where he was captain-general and played until 1921, when he moved to Sporting Clube de Portugal.

He immediately won a place in the midfield of the Lions, participating in the 1st Final of the Portuguese Championships, which he would win in 1923, integrating the team that won the first "double" in Sporting history.

Still as a player, he was a four-time Lisbon Champion, the last of whom in the 1927/28 season, accumulating the functions of field coach, having in January 1926 assumed the position of General Captain of the Football section, following The resignation of Francisco Stromp.

He would also do some games until 1930, when he resumed the command of the team, to become again Lisbon Champion, but nevertheless the Direction understood to replace it by the Englishman Artur John.

He had then played more than 70 games for Sporting's main team, scoring 17 goals, a mark that is explained because he also played many times in the advanced line.

It was international once, in a match played in Seville on 16 December 1923, when Portugal lost 3–0 to Spain.

In 1931 he received the Medal of Merit and Dedication, awarded at the time of the commemorations of the 25 years of Sporting Clube de Portugal.

In 1932, when he was only a member of great prestige, and following a humiliating defeat with the Belenenses, he became involved in a mess with a director, and was suspended from membership for a year, escaping expulsion due to the relevance of the services rendered to the Club.

He then became the first Portuguese coach to emigrate, while going to train the Zaragoza of Spain, taking this Club to the Final of the Spanish Third League.

In the 1934/35 season, he returned to Sporting Clube de Portugal to win another Lisbon Championship, a season in which the club was a regional champion in all categories, ranked 2nd in the first edition of the League Championship and went to the Portuguese Championship Final.

Despite these results, Dos Santos did not continue to train Sporting teams in the following season and in December 1935 he left for Mozambique, where he went to work at the Companhia das Caminhos de Ferro, accumulating the position of coach of that company's team.

He also played 11 Handball and Field Hockey at Sporting.

He died on 28 January 1941.
