= Carlos Alves (footballer, born 1903) =

Portuguese footballer

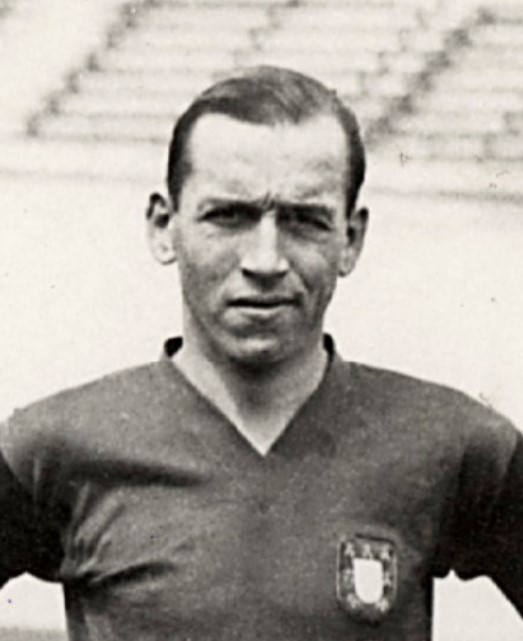
- Carlos Alves in 1928

Personal information
- Full name: Carlos Alves Júnior
- Date of birth: 10 October 1903
- Place of birth: Lisbon, Portugal
- Date of death: 12 November 1970 (aged 67)
- Position: Central defender

Senior career*
Years	Team	Apps	(Gls)
1927–1933	Carcavelinhos		
1934–1935	Académico do Porto		

International career
1928–1933	Portugal	18	(0)
- * Club domestic league appearances and goals

Carlos Alves Júnior, better known as Carlos Alves (10 October 1903, in Lisbon – 12 November 1970), was a Portuguese footballer, who played as central defender. He became famous for his black gloves, later used by his grandson, João Alves.

== International career ==
Alves had 18 caps for Portugal, 13 for Carcavelinhos and 5 for Académico do Porto. Alves made his debut at 8 January 1928 against Spain in a 2–2 draw in Lisbon. He was a member of the Portugal squad at the 1928 Football Olympic Tournament and played in all of the National Team 3 games in the tournament. His last game was at 2 April 1933, in a 0–3 loss to Spain, in Vigo, in a friendly match, aged 29 years old.
