= 1978–79 Primeira Divisão =

45th season of top-tier Portuguese football

Primeira Liga
- Season: 1978-79
- Champions: F.C. Porto; 7th title
- Relegated: Famalicão; Barreirense; Académica de Coimbra; Académico de Viseu
- European Cup: F.C. Porto
- Cup Winners' Cup: Boavista
- UEFA Cup: Benfica; Sporting CP
- Matches: 240
- Goals: 626 (2.61 per match)
- Top goalscorer: Fernando Gomes (27 goals)

Statistics of Portuguese Liga in the 1978–79 season.

== Overview ==
It was contested by 16 teams, and F.C. Porto won the championship.

== League standings ==
| Pos | Team | Pld | W | D | L | GF | GA | GD | Pts | Qualification or relegation |
|---|---|---|---|---|---|---|---|---|---|---|
| 1 | Porto (C) | 30 | 21 | 8 | 1 | 70 | 19 | +51 | 50 | Qualification to European Cup first round |
| 2 | Benfica | 30 | 23 | 3 | 4 | 75 | 21 | +54 | 49 | Qualification to UEFA Cup first round |
| 3 | Sporting CP | 30 | 17 | 8 | 5 | 46 | 22 | +24 | 42 | Qualification to UEFA Cup first round |
| 4 | Braga | 30 | 16 | 5 | 9 | 49 | 35 | +14 | 37 | |
| 5 | Varzim | 30 | 11 | 10 | 9 | 30 | 29 | +1 | 32 | |
| 6 | Vitória de Guimarães | 30 | 12 | 7 | 11 | 44 | 38 | +6 | 31 | |
| 7 | Vitória de Setúbal | 30 | 12 | 7 | 11 | 38 | 38 | 0 | 31 | |
| 8 | Belenenses | 30 | 10 | 9 | 11 | 47 | 43 | +4 | 29 | |
| 9 | Boavista | 30 | 12 | 3 | 15 | 36 | 40 | −4 | 27 | Qualification to Cup Winners' Cup first round |
| 10 | Marítimo | 30 | 11 | 5 | 14 | 36 | 37 | −1 | 27 | |
| 11 | Estoril | 30 | 8 | 10 | 12 | 24 | 42 | −18 | 26 | |
| 12 | Beira-Mar | 30 | 11 | 2 | 17 | 44 | 56 | −12 | 24 | |
| 13 | Famalicão (R) | 30 | 9 | 6 | 15 | 30 | 45 | −15 | 24 | Relegation to Segunda Divisão |
| 14 | Barreirense (R) | 30 | 8 | 6 | 16 | 24 | 45 | −21 | 22 | Relegation to Segunda Divisão |
| 15 | Académica (R) | 30 | 5 | 8 | 17 | 20 | 41 | −21 | 18 | Relegation to Segunda Divisão |
| 16 | Académico de Viseu (R) | 30 | 5 | 1 | 24 | 13 | 75 | −62 | 11 | Relegation to Segunda Divisão |

Source: RSSSF
(C) Champions; (R) Relegated

== Results ==
| Home \ Away | ACA | ACV | BAR | BEM | BEL | BEN | BOA | BRA | EST | FAM | MAR | POR | SCP | VAR | VGU | VSE |
|---|---|---|---|---|---|---|---|---|---|---|---|---|---|---|---|---|
| Académica | | 4–0 | 2–1 | 3–0 | 3–1 | 0–2 | 1–0 | 0–1 | 0–0 | 0–2 | 1–3 | 0–3 | 0–0 | 1–1 | 2–2 | 0–0 |
| Académico de Viseu | 1–0 | | 1–0 | 0–3 | 1–3 | 2–6 | 1–0 | 1–1 | 0–3 | 0–1 | 1–2 | 0–5 | 0–1 | 1–0 | 0–1 | 2–1 |
| Barreirense | 1–0 | 1–0 | | 0–4 | 1–1 | 0–4 | 2–1 | 0–1 | 1–1 | 3–5 | 2–0 | 1–2 | 1–0 | 1–0 | 1–1 | 0–1 |
| Beira-Mar | 1–0 | 4–0 | 1–0 | | 3–1 | 0–0 | 0–1 | 2–1 | 0–1 | 3–0 | 2–0 | 2–3 | 1–2 | 2–2 | 2–4 | 2–3 |
| Belenenses | 2–1 | 4–0 | 2–3 | 4–0 | | 1–0 | 2–4 | 7–1 | 1–1 | 2–0 | 3–0 | 0–0 | 1–1 | 0–0 | 1–1 | 1–0 |
| Benfica | 6–1 | 5–0 | 1–0 | 5–1 | 2–1 | | 3–0 | 2–0 | 5–1 | 5–3 | 3–1 | 1–1 | 5–0 | 3–0 | 3–2 | 2–0 |
| Boavista | 1–0 | 5–0 | 0–3 | 4–1 | 2–2 | 0–1 | | 2–1 | 1–0 | 3–0 | 1–0 | 1–2 | 2–0 | 0–1 | 0–3 | 2–1 |
| Braga | 3–0 | 4–0 | 2–0 | 3–2 | 2–1 | 0–2 | 3–1 | | 3–0 | 1–0 | 3–0 | 3–1 | 1–1 | 2–0 | 2–0 | 1–1 |
| Estoril | 1–0 | 1–0 | 1–1 | 2–1 | 0–0 | 0–2 | 0–1 | 1–4 | | 0–0 | 0–0 | 1–1 | 1–1 | 3–5 | 2–0 | 1–0 |
| Famalicão | 0–0 | 3–0 | 2–0 | 1–2 | 2–1 | 0–1 | 1–0 | 2–2 | 0–1 | | 1–0 | 0–4 | 1–2 | 0–0 | 2–0 | 0–0 |
| Marítimo | 0–0 | 2–0 | 4–0 | 1–2 | 1–0 | 2–1 | 2–2 | 1–1 | 3–0 | 3–0 | | 0–1 | 2–3 | 1–0 | 1–2 | 4–1 |
| Porto | 3–0 | 6–1 | 4–1 | 6–1 | 4–0 | 1–0 | 0–0 | 3–2 | 2–0 | 2–1 | 3–1 | | 0–0 | 3–0 | 1–1 | 5–1 |
| Sporting CP | 1–0 | 2–0 | 2–0 | 3–0 | 5–1 | 0–1 | 2–0 | 2–0 | 4–0 | 3–0 | 1–0 | 0–0 | | 2–0 | 3–0 | 2–1 |
| Varzim | 1–1 | 2–0 | 2–0 | 2–1 | 2–0 | 1–1 | 1–0 | 1–0 | 1–1 | 1–1 | 3–0 | 0–0 | 1–0 | | 1–0 | 1–1 |
| Vitória de Guimarães | 3–0 | 1–0 | 0–0 | 2–1 | 1–1 | 1–2 | 3–1 | 0–1 | 3–1 | 3–1 | 0–2 | 1–3 | 1–1 | 3–1 | | 5–0 |
| Vitória de Setúbal | 1–0 | 4–1 | 0–0 | 2–0 | 2–3 | 2–1 | 4–1 | 2–0 | 2–0 | 3–1 | 0–0 | 0–1 | 2–2 | 1–0 | 2–0 | |

Legend: Blue = home team win; Yellow = draw; Red = away team win.

== Season statistics ==
=== Top goalscorers ===
| Rank | Player | Club | Goals |
|---|---|---|---|
| 1 | (Portugal) Fernando Gomes | Porto | 27 |
| 2 | (Portugal) Nené | Benfica | 25 |
| 3 | (Portugal) António Oliveira | Porto | 17 |
| 3 | (Portugal) Reinaldo | Benfica | 17 |
| 5 | (Brazil) Jeremias | Vitória de Guimarães | 13 |
| 5 | (Brazil) China | Marítimo | 13 |
| 7 | (Guinea-Bissau) Arnaldo Silva | Marítimo | 12 |
| 8 | (Brazil) Gomes | Boavista | 11 |
| 8 | (Brazil) Lincoln | Belenenses | 11 |
| 8 | (Portugal) Lito | Braga | 11 |
| 8 | (Portugal) João Alves | Benfica | 11 |
