= António Stromp =

Portuguese sprinter

Personal information
- Nationality: Portuguese
- Born: 13 June 1894 Lisbon, Portugal
- Died: 6 July 1921 (aged 27)

Sport
- Sport: Sprinting
- Event: 100 metres

António Stromp (13 June 1894 – 6 July 1921) was a Portuguese sprinter. He competed in the men's 100 metres at the 1912 Summer Olympics. He was one of the founders of Sporting CP where he was also a football player, tennis player and fencer.

== Personal life ==
He was son of Francisco Reis Stromp, a medical doctor, brother of Francisco Stromp, a co-founder and footballer of Sporting CP, and died from syphilis.
