= Osvaldinho (footballer, born 1945) =

Portuguese footballer (1945–2025)

Personal information
- Full name: Firmino Beleizão da Graça Sardinha
- Date of birth: 10 September 1945
- Place of birth: Beja, Portugal
- Date of death: 3 June 2025 (aged 79)
- Position: Defender

Youth career
- 1962–1963: Desportivo Beja

Senior career*
Years	Team	Apps	(Gls)
1963–1964	Desportivo Beja		
1964–1966	Vitória Guimarães	6	
1966–1967	→ Boavista (loan)		
1967–1969	Benfica de São Tomé e Príncipe		
1969–1978	Vitória Guimarães	211	(1)
1978–1979	Marítimo	23	
1979–1980	Gil Vicente	27	

International career
	Portugal	2	
- * Club domestic league appearances and goals

Firmino Baleizão da Graça Sardinha (10 September 1945 – 3 June 2025), known as Osvaldinho, was a Portuguese footballer who played as defender for Desportivo Beja, Vitória Guimarães, Boavista F.C., Benfica de São Tomé e Príncipe, Marítimo and Gil Vicente. He earned two caps for the Portugal national team.

Osvaldinho was one of Vitória de Guimarães's main players during the 1970s, with more than 200 appearances for the club. He was honored in September 2023. Osvaldinho died on 3 June 2025, at the age of 79.
