= Carnaxide =

- Civil parish
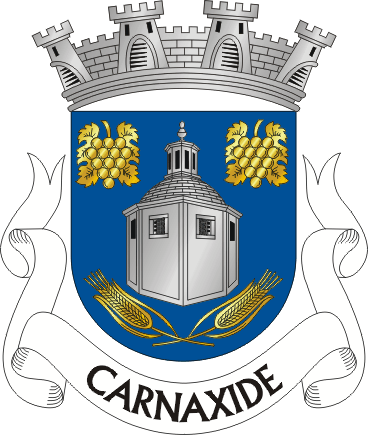
- Coat of arms

- Location in Portugal
- Coordinates: 38°43′N 9°15′W
- Country: Portugal
- Region: Lisbon
- Metropolitan area: Lisbon
- District: Lisbon
- Municipality: Oeiras
- Disbanded: 2013

Area
  - Total: 6.51 km^{2} (2.51 sq mi)

Population (2011)
  - Total: 25,911
  - Density: 3,980/km^{2} (10,300/sq mi)
- Time zone: UTC+00:00 (WET)
  - Summer (DST): UTC+01:00 (WEST)
- Postal code: 2790-047
- Website: www.jf-carnaxide.pt

Carnaxide (European Portuguese pronunciation: [kɐɾnɐˈʃiðɨ]) is a former civil parish in the municipality of Oeiras, Portugal. In 2013, the parish merged with Queijas into the new parish Carnaxide e Queijas. The population in 2011 was 25,911, in an area of 6.51 km^{2}. It was elevated to town status on 16 August 1991. Having first appeared in official documentation in the 14th century, its existence goes back as far as 13th century.

== Economy ==
Its principal economic activities reside in the presence of large international companies like EFACEC, Sumol + Compal (former Sumol), and Mota-Engil, and in the strong reliance on the small commerce. Also localized there are Sociedade Independente de Comunicação (SIC) television station and the business parks Parque Suécia, NeoPark and Parque Holanda.
