= Adelino Teixeira (footballer) =

Portuguese football manager and former player

Personal information
- Full name: Adelino José de Jesus Teixeira
- Date of birth: 4 June 1952 (age 74)
- Place of birth: Oliveira de Azeméis, Portugal
- Positions: Left back; defensive midfielder

Youth career
- 1965–1966: Sanjoanense
- 1966–1970: Leixões

Senior career*
Years	Team	Apps	(Gls)
1970–1974	Leixões	93	(2)
1974–1983	Porto	174	(4)
1983–1985	Boavista	30	(1)
1985–1986	Penafiel	25	(0)
Total		322	(7)

International career
1975	Portugal U21	2	(0)
1974–1981	Portugal	12	(0)

Managerial career
- 1990–1991: Ovarense
- 1992–1993: Sanjoanense
- 1994–1995: Ovarense
- 1995–1996: Espinho
- 1997–1998: Leixões
- 2001: Leixões
- 2002: Sanjoanense
- 2003–2004: Oliveirense
- 2005–2006: Oliveira Hospital
- * Club domestic league appearances and goals

Adelino José de Jesus Teixeira (born 4 June 1952) is a Portuguese retired footballer who played mainly as a left back or a defensive midfielder.

== Club career ==
Over the course of 16 seasons Teixeira appeared in 322 Primeira Liga games, mainly in representation of FC Porto (nine years), with which he won two consecutive national championships – contributing with 39 matches combined – and one domestic cup.

In the 90s/2000s Teixeira coached several clubs, his biggest achievement being leading S.C. Espinho to the third position in the second division in 1995–96, with the subsequent promotion.

== Honours ==
Porto

- Primeira Divisão: 1977–78, 1978–79
- Taça de Portugal: 1976–77
- Supertaça Cândido de Oliveira: 1981
