= Queijas =

- Civil parish
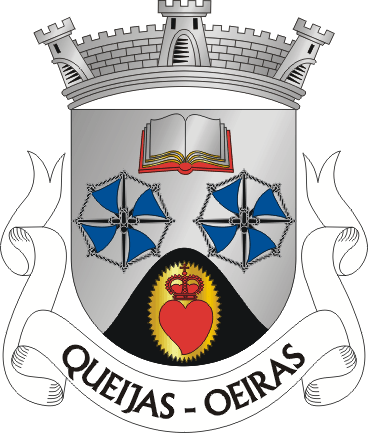
- Coat of arms

- Location in Portugal
- Coordinates: 38.733°N 9.256°W
- Country: Portugal
- Region: Lisbon
- Metropolitan area: Lisbon
- District: Lisbon
- Municipality: Oeiras
- Disbanded: 28 January 2013

Area
  - Total: 2.27 km^{2} (0.88 sq mi)

Population (2011)
  - Total: 10,377
  - Density: 4,570/km^{2} (11,800/sq mi)
- Time zone: UTC+00:00 (WET)
  - Summer (DST): UTC+01:00 (WEST)
- Website: www.jf-queijas.pt

Queijas (European Portuguese: [ˈkejʒɐʃ]), formerly officially known as the Parish of Queijas (Portuguese: Freguesia de Queijas, pronounced [fɾɨɣɨˈzi.ɐ dɨ ˈkejʒɐʃ]), is a town and former civil parish in the municipality of Oeiras, Portugal, located within the Lisbon metropolitan area.

The parish was created on 11 June 1993, following the dismemberment of the parish of Carnaxide. It included the towns of Linda-a-Pastora and Queijas itself, and was promoted to town status on 12 July 2001. On 28 January 2013, the civil parish merged with Carnaxide to form the new civil parish of Carnaxide and Queijas. The parish's patron saint was Saint Michael the Archangel.
