= João Fonseca (footballer) =

Portuguese footballer

Personal information
- Full name: João Francisco Fonseca dos Santos
- Date of birth: 19 February 1948 (age 78)
- Place of birth: Matosinhos, Portugal
- Height: 1.80 m (5 ft 11 in)
- Position: Goalkeeper

Youth career
- 1962–1967: Leixões

Senior career*
Years	Team	Apps	(Gls)
1967–1969	Leixões	46	(0)
1969–1975	Benfica	10	(0)
1972–1973	→ Leixões (loan)	30	(0)
1973–1975	→ Ourense (loan)	71	(0)
1975–1977	Varzim	18	(0)
1977–1983	Porto	127	(0)
1983	→ Ourense (loan)	0	(0)
1983–1984	Famalicão	29	(0)
1984–1988	Chaves	59	(0)
Total		390	(0)

International career
1976–1977	Portugal U21	3	(0)
1976	Portugal	1	(0)

Managerial career
- 1988–1989: Chaves
- 1989–1990: Vila Real
- 1990–1991: Varzim
- 1991–1992: Gil Vicente (assistant)
- 1992–1994: Braga (assistant)
- 1994: Lousada
- 1994: Fátima (assistant)
- 1995: Lousada
- 1995: Fátima (assistant)
- 1996–1998: Vitória Guimarães (assistant)
- 1998–1999: Feirense (assistant)
- 1999: Aliados Lordelo
- 2000: Oriental (assistant)
- 2000–2001: Leça (assistant)
- 2001: Felgueiras (assistant)
- 2002: Machico (assistant)
- 2003: Leixões (assistant)
- * Club domestic league appearances and goals

João Francisco Fonseca dos Santos (born 19 February 1948), known as Fonseca, is a retired Portuguese footballer who played as a goalkeeper.

== Honours ==
Benfica

- Primeira Divisão: 1970–71, 1971–72
- Taça de Portugal: 1969–70, 1971–72

Varzim

- Segunda Divisão: 1975–76

Porto

- Primeira Divisão: 1977–78, 1978–79
- Supertaça Cândido de Oliveira: 1981
