= Francisco Stromp =

Portuguese footballer and coach

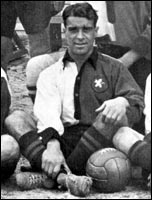
- Born: Francisco dos Reis Stromp; 21 May 1892; Lisbon, Portugal
- Died: 1 July 1930 (aged 38); Lisbon, Portugal
- Occupations: Coach; Association football player Club official
- Known for: Foundation of Sporting Clube de Portugal

Francisco dos Reis Stromp was a Portuguese football player and coach. He was a co-founding member and club official of the Sporting Clube de Portugal.

== History ==
Francisco Stromp was born on 21 May 1892 in Largo do Intendente in Lisbon, and was the first great symbol of Sporting. His father, Francisco dos Reis Stromp, was a medical doctor at an hospital in Lisbon. His mother was Elisa Lima de Oliveira Roxo.

At the age of three, Francisco fell ill and his father's friends and family doctors advised his family to leave Lisbon because the boy needed free air. They moved to Lumiar, which was out of town at the time. It was there that he met José Alvalade with whom he founded Sporting Clube de Portugal in 1906, being one of the dissidents of the Campo Grande Football Club.

In 1908, Francisco Stromp was 16 years old when he made his debut with Sporting Clube de Portugal. Throughout his career he has played more than one hundred games in the honor category, and captained the team for several years, during which he was four times Lisbon Champion and Portuguese Champion in the 1922–23 season, in this case also as coach, after Augusto Sabbo resignation and after the Technical Council had allowed the captains of the 1ª and 2ª categories to direct the training sessions of the teams, like that of Sporting.

Before, at a time when the figure of the coach did not yet exist, it was the captain who guided the team and made the necessary decisions on the field. It can be said that Francisco Stromp was the first champion manager in Sporting, being responsible for the first Lisbon Championship conquered in the 1914–15 season.

Within the field he occupied the positions of mid-right and advanced-center, standing out for his delivery having represented the several Lisbon Selections of that time, including the first to play abroad, that on 27 August 1910 won in Spain to Huelva by 4–0, with 2 goals of his own, and that went to Brazil in 1913.

Although not an eclectic athlete like his brother António, he was champion in the discus throw and in the 3x100m relay, also practicing tennis, cricket and rugby.

He was also a football referee, at a time when it was the players who played those roles.

Stromp dedicated much of his life to Sporting, serving the club in various capacities.

He also held various positions as a club officer, beginning with the General Assembly Board presided over by the Viscount of Alvalade. Later he was part of the Queirós dos Santos and Soares Júnior Directorates in Management in 1918, and became the Vice President of the Board between 19 February 1925 and 23 February 1926.

He was also part of the first and third Administrative Commission of Sporting Clube de Portugal, assuming his responsibilities in the difficult moments of the Club's life, and ended his participation in the leadership, as a Member of the Board chaired by Sanches Navarro in the Management of 1927 .

On 1 July 1930 he committed suicide by throwing himself under a train, in the agony of a serious debilitating illness, syphilis, choosing the day in which Sporting celebrated its 24th birthday, and remained perpetually as the club member nº. 3, the number he had at the time.

On 18 December 1962 a group of distinguished sportinguists decided to establish themselves to promote initiatives that, within the "leonine spirit", would serve to enhance and enhance Sporting. Francisco Silva, one of the promoters of the movement, suggested to the unanimous acceptance that the name of Francisco Stromp should serve as patron to the group.

This was how the Stromp Group was born, considered the "moral reserve of Sporting", whose most significant of initiatives is the annual award of the Stromp Awards, which aim to distinguish all those who stand out the most every year, in the service of the Club in its various areas.

On 26 October 1990 he was awarded, posthumously, the Sports Merit Medal.

The Lisbon City Council attributed its name to a street in the area of Estádio José Alvalade, where a bust evocative of this eternal symbol of Sporting Clube de Portugal was placed.

== Honours ==
=== Player ===
Sporting CP

- Campeonato de Portugal: 1922–23
- Lisbon Championship: 1914–15, 1918–19, 1921–22, 1922–23

=== Manager ===
Sporting CP

- Lisbon Championship: 8
