= Tibi (footballer) =

Portuguese footballer (1951–2021)

Personal information
- Full name: António José de Oliveira Meireles
- Date of birth: 9 April 1951
- Place of birth: Matosinhos, Portugal
- Date of death: 28 December 2021 (aged 70)
- Place of death: Matosinhos, Portugal
- Height: 1.85 m (6 ft 1 in)
- Position: Goalkeeper

Senior career*
| Years | Team | Apps | (Gls) |
| 1969–1972 | Leixões | 63 | (0) |
| 1972–1982 | Porto | 107 | (0) |
| 1977–1978 | → Varzim (loan) | 25 | (0) |
| 1978–1979 | → Famalicão (loan) | 30 | (0) |
| 1982–1983 | Leixões | 12 | (0) |
| 1983–1984 | Águeda | 21 | (0) |
| 1984–1985 | Mangualde | 3 | (0) |
| 1985–1987 | Espinho | 3 | (0) |
| 1987–1988 | Maia | | |
| Total | | 264 | (0) |

International career
| 1974–1981 | Portugal | 2 | (0) |
- * Club domestic league appearances and goals

António José de Oliveira Meireles (9 April 1951 – 28 December 2021), known as Tibi, was a Portuguese footballer who played as a goalkeeper.

== Club career ==
Born in Matosinhos, Porto District, Tibi spent the better part of his 19-year senior career with FC Porto after signing in 1982 from local club Leixões SC. After being first choice for manager Béla Guttmann, he was made surplus to requirements by José Maria Pedroto.

During his spell at the Estádio das Antas, Tibi appeared in 131 competitive matches, won two Supertaça Cândido de Oliveira and the 1977 Taça de Portugal.

== International career ==
Tibi won two caps for Portugal over seven years. His debut was on 13 November 1974, in a 3–0 friendly away loss against Switzerland.

== Death ==
On 28 December 2021, Tibi died in his hometown from degenerative disease. He was 70 years old.
