= Vítor Martins (footballer) =

Portuguese footballer

Personal information
- Full name: Vitor Manuel Rosa Martins
- Date of birth: 27 March 1950 (age 76)
- Place of birth: Alcobaça, Portugal
- Height: 1.72 m (5 ft 8 in)
- Position: Midfielder

Youth career
- 1964–1965: Nazarenos
- 1965–1968: Benfica

Senior career*
Years	Team	Apps	(Gls)
1968–1979	Benfica	149	(25)

International career
1968	Portugal U18	5	(0)
1971–1973	Portugal U21	5	(0)
1974–1975	Portugal	3	(0)
- * Club domestic league appearances and goals

Vítor Manuel Rosa Martins (born 27 March 1950) is a Portuguese former footballer who played as a midfielder.

== Club career ==
Born in Alcobaça, Leiria District, Martins spent his entire professional career with S.L. Benfica after joining the club's youth system at the age of 15. He was part of the squads that won six Primeira Liga championships in the 70s, scoring in his league debut on 1 December 1969 against U.F.C.I. Tomar (6–0 home win).

Martins was forced to retire at the age of only 29: after undergoing surgery for a meniscus injury two years earlier, he suffered an embolism. He continued to work with Benfica, as a scout.

== International career ==
Martins earned three caps for Portugal over four months. One of them was a 0–0 UEFA Euro 1976 qualifier with England at Wembley Stadium, on 20 November 1974.

== Honours ==
- Primeira Liga: 1970–71, 1971–72, 1972–73, 1974–75, 1975–76, 1976–77

== See also ==
- List of one-club men
