= Carnaxide e Queijas =

- Civil parish
- Location in Portugal
- Coordinates: 38.727°N 9.243°W
- Country: Portugal
- Region: Lisbon
- Metropolitan area: Lisbon
- District: Lisbon
- Municipality: Oeiras

Area
  - Total: 8.81 km^{2} (3.40 sq mi)

Population (2011)
  - Total: 36,288
  - Density: 4,120/km^{2} (10,700/sq mi)
- Time zone: UTC+00:00 (WET)
  - Summer (DST): UTC+01:00 (WEST)

Carnaxide e Queijas is a civil parish in the municipality of Oeiras, Portugal. It was formed in 2013 by the merger of the former parishes Carnaxide and Queijas. The population in 2011 was 36,288, in an area of 8.81 km².
