= Nelinho (Portuguese footballer) =

Portuguese footballer

Personal information
- Full name: Joaquim Manuel Rodrigues Silva Marques
- Date of birth: 22 August 1948 (age 78)
- Place of birth: Lisbon, Portugal
- Position: Winger

Youth career
- 1964–1968: Palmense

Senior career*
Years	Team	Apps	(Gls)
1968–1971	Palmense		
1971–1972	Beira-Mar	29	(8)
1972–1977	Benfica	46	(11)
1977–1980	Braga	79	(13)
1980–1981	Marítimo	2	(0)
Total		156	(32)

International career
1977–1979	Portugal	2	(0)
- * Club domestic league appearances and goals

Joaquim Manuel Rodrigues Silva Marques (born 22 August 1948 in Lisbon), known as Nelinho, is a retired Portuguese footballer who played as a right winger.
