= Carlos Simões =

Portuguese footballer

Personal information
- Full name: Carlos António Fonseca Simões
- Date of birth: 28 July 1951 (age 75)
- Place of birth: Coimbra, Portugal
- Position: Central defender

Youth career
- 1966–1970: Académica

Senior career*
Years	Team	Apps	(Gls)
1969–1974	Académica	76	(0)
1974–1983	Porto	201	(2)
1983–1987	Portimonense	82	(2)
1987–1988	Académica	35	(0)

International career
1969	Portugal U18	4	(1)
1979–1981	Portugal	13	(0)

Managerial career
- 1989–1990: Arthur Street fc
- 1991–1992: Académico Viseu
- 1992: Oliveirense
- 1992–1993: Campomaiorense
- 1993–1995: União Coimbra
- 1997–1998: Tirsense
- 1999–2000: Oliveira do Bairro
- 2000–2002: Anadia
- 2002–2004: Oliveira do Bairro
- * Club domestic league appearances and goals

Carlos António Fonseca Simőes (born 28 July 1951) is a former Portuguese footballer who played as central defender. Simões gained 13 caps for the Portugal national team.

== Honours ==
=== Club ===
Académica

- Segunda Divisão: 1972–73

Porto

- Primeira Divisão: 1977–78, 1978–79
- Taça de Portugal: 1976–77
- Supertaça Cândido de Oliveira: 1981
