= Jorge Gomes (footballer) =

Brazilian footballer

Personal information
- Full name: Jorge Gomes da Silva Filho
- Date of birth: 18 May 1954 (age 72)
- Place of birth: Rio de Janeiro, Brazil
- Height: 1.83 m (6 ft 0 in)
- Position: Striker

Senior career*
Years	Team	Apps	(Gls)
1973–1974	Vasco Gama		
1975–1976	União Lamas		
1976–1979	Boavista	51	(14)
1979–1982	Benfica	41	(11)
1982–1989	Braga	170	(36)
1989–1990	Fafe	17	(2)
1990–1991	Águeda	3	(0)
Total		282	(63)
- * Club domestic league appearances and goals

Jorge Gomes da Silva Filho (born 18 May 1954) is a Brazilian retired footballer who played as a striker.

Over the course of 13 seasons, he amassed Primeira Liga totals of 262 matches and 61 goals.

== Football career ==
Born in Rio de Janeiro, Gomes played for CR Vasco da Gama before moving to Portugal. After a brief spell at C.F. União de Lamas he signed with Boavista FC, where he spent three seasons before joining fellow Primeira Liga side S.L. Benfica on 11 August 1979; he was the first ever foreign player to sign for the 75-year-old club.

During his three-year tenure, Gomes faced stiff competition from César, Zoran Filipović, Nené and Reinaldo, being sparingly used and leaving Lisbon after a disagreement with manager Sven-Göran Eriksson. He subsequently signed for S.C. Braga, going on to score nearly 50 competitive goals; he retired at the age of 37, after one year apiece with AD Fafe and R.D. Águeda (both in the Segunda Liga).

== Honours ==
Benfica

- Portuguese League: 1980–81
- Portuguese Cup: 1979–80, 1980–81
- Supertaça Cândido de Oliveira: Runner-up 1981

Boavista

- Portuguese Cup: 1978–79
