= Teixeirinha (footballer) =

Portuguese footballer and coach

Personal information
- Full name: Manuel Fernando da Silva Teixeira
- Date of birth: 26 January 1957 (age 69)
- Place of birth: Vila Nova de Gaia, Portugal
- Height: 1.78 m (5 ft 10 in)
- Position: Defender

Youth career
- 1972–1973: Candal
- 1974–1975: Porto

Senior career*
Years	Team	Apps	(Gls)
1975–1978	Porto	13	(0)
1978–1979	Académico de Viseu	14	(0)
1979–1980	Beira-Mar	26	(0)
1980–1981	Vitória Setúbal	30	(0)
1981–1984	Porto	12	(0)
1984–1986	Vitória Guimarães	33	(4)
1986–1990	Marítimo	115	(4)
1990–1991	Penafiel	7	(0)
1991–1992	Ovarense	4	(0)

International career
1975	Portugal U18	4	(0)
1976–1977	Portugal U21	12	(0)
1981	Portugal B	1	(0)

Managerial career
- 2011–2012: Candal
- * Club domestic league appearances and goals

Manuel Fernando da Silva Teixeira, known as Teixeirinha (born 26 January 1957) is a former Portuguese football player and coach.

He played 16 seasons and 249 games in the Primeira Liga for Marítimo, Vitória Guimarães, Vitória Setúbal, Beira-Mar, Porto, Académico de Viseu and Penafiel.

== Club career ==
He made his Primeira Liga debut for Porto on 7 March 1976 in a game against Boavista.

== Honours ==
Porto

- Supertaça Cândido de Oliveira: 1983
