= Baltasar Gonçalves =

Portuguese footballer (1948–2025)

Baltasar
Personal information
- Full name: Vítor Manuel Jesus Gonçalves
- Date of birth: 13 May 1948
- Place of birth: Almada, Portugal
- Date of death: 18 October 2025 (aged 77)
- Position: Forward

Youth career
- 1963–1966: Pescadores

Senior career*
| Years | Team | Apps | (Gls) |
| 1969–1973 | Atlético CP | | |
| 1973–1979 | Sporting CP | 103 | (8) |
| 1979–1982 | Belenenses | 79 | (3) |
| 1982–1984 | Vizela | | |
| 1984–1986 | Lixa | | |

International career
| 1977 | Portugal | 1 | (0) |
- * Club domestic league appearances and goals

Vítor Manuel Jesus Gonçalves (13 May 1948 – 18 October 2025), known as Baltasar, was a Portuguese footballer who played as forward. He gained one cap for Portugal, against Switzerland 30 March 1977 in Funchal, in a 1–0 victory. He died on 18 October 2025, at the age of 77.
