= Fernando Mendes (footballer, born 1937) =

Portuguese footballer and manager (1937–2016)

Personal information
- Full name: Fernando Mamede Mendes
- Date of birth: 15 July 1937
- Place of birth: Seia, Portugal
- Date of death: 31 March 2016 (aged 78)
- Place of death: Lisbon, Portugal
- Position: Midfielder

Youth career
- 1953–1956: Sporting CP

Senior career*
Years	Team	Apps	(Gls)
1956–1968	Sporting CP	165	(1)
1968–1969	Atlético	12	(1)
Total		177	(2)

International career
1959–1965	Portugal	21	(0)

Managerial career
- 1974–1975: Lusitânia
- 1975–1976: Atlético
- 1976–1977: Vianense
- 1977–1979: Sporting CP (youth)
- 1980: Sporting CP
- 1981: Marítimo
- 1982–1984: Belenenses
- 1984–1985: Farense
- 1985–1986: Trofense
- 1986–1988: Sporting CP (assistant)
- 1988–1996: Sporting CP (youth)
- 1996: Sporting CP
- 2000: Lourinhanense
- 2000–2001: Sporting CP
- * Club domestic league appearances and goals

Fernando Mamede Mendes (15 July 1937 – 31 March 2016) was a Portuguese football midfielder and manager.

== Playing career ==
Mendes was born in Seia, Guarda District. During his professional career, which lasted 13 seasons, he played almost exclusively for Sporting CP, also starting and finishing his football development at the Lisbon side. He appeared in 233 matches during his spell, including friendlies.

Mendes earned 21 caps for Portugal in six years, but did not attend any major international tournament. On 25 April 1965, he broke his leg in the early minutes of the away fixture against Czechoslovakia for the 1966 FIFA World Cup qualifiers, as the national team eventually won 1–0 thanks to Eusébio with ten players (no substitutions were allowed then).

== Coaching career ==
Mendes never fully recovered from that situation, and retired four years later at 31. In 24 Primeira Liga games over three separate seasons, he served as interim manager at his main club (the last in late 2000–early 2001), winning nine, drawing nine and losing six; with the Lions, he also worked as an assistant coach and extensively with the youth teams.

== Death ==
Mendes died on 31 March 2016 at the Hospital Pulido Valente in Lisbon, after a long illness. He was 78 years old.
