= Rodolfo Reis =

Portuguese footballer and manager

Personal information
- Full name: Rodolfo dos Reis Ferreira
- Date of birth: 29 January 1954 (age 72)
- Place of birth: Porto, Portugal
- Height: 1.80 m (5 ft 11 in)
- Position: Defensive midfielder

Youth career
- 1966–1972: Porto

Senior career*
| Years | Team | Apps | (Gls) |
| 1972–1984 | Porto | 244 | (6) |

International career
| 1973–1976 | Portugal U21 | 7 | (0) |
| 1978 | Portugal B | 1 | (0) |
| 1977–1981 | Portugal | 6 | (0) |

Managerial career
- 1986–1987: Salgueiros
- 1987–1989: Famalicão
- 1989–1991: Gil Vicente
- 1991–1993: Tirsense
- 1993: Felgueiras
- 1994–1995: Beira-Mar
- 1995–1996: Nacional
- 1996–1997: Leça
- 1998–2001: Porto (assistant)
- * Club domestic league appearances and goals

Rodolfo dos Reis Ferreira (born 29 January 1954 in Porto) is a Portuguese former football defensive midfielder and manager.

== See also ==
- List of one-club men
