= Alfredo Murça =

Portuguese footballer

Personal information
- Full name: Alfredo Manuel da Silva Murça
- Date of birth: 17 January 1948
- Place of birth: Almada, Portugal
- Date of death: 24 August 2007 (aged 59)
- Position: Defender

Youth career
- 1963–1964: Pescadores

Senior career*
Years	Team	Apps	(Gls)
1968–1974	Belenenses	156	(3)
1974–1981	Porto	158	(4)
1981–1984	Vitória Guimarães	77	(3)

International career
1969–1979	Portugal	5	(0)

Managerial career
- 1988: Porto
- * Club domestic league appearances and goals

Alfredo Manuel da Silva Murça (17 January 1948 – 24 August 2007) was a Portuguese international footballer who played as a defender.

== Football career ==
Murça earned 5 caps for the Portugal national football team. He made his international debut on 10 December 1969 in London, in a 1–0 defeat against England.

== Personal ==
He was the older brother of Joaquim Murça.
