= Augusto Sabbo =

Portuguese football coach (1887–1971)

- Born: 27 March 1887; Lisbon, Portugal
- Died: 30 October 1971 (aged 84); Lisbon, Portugal
- Occupations: Coach, football player, engineer, writer
- Known for: Sporting CP, F.C. Barreirense

Augusto Sabbo (27 March 1887 – 30 October 1971) was a Portuguese football coach and writer.

== Early career ==
Sabbo studied in Germany, where he played football at the Saxony-based Mittweidaer BC. Having graduated in engineering, he directed the assembly of the electric traction network of the city of Coimbra. Returning to Portugal, he shined in the CIF, at the beginning of the 20th century, as captain of the team and its coach, with innovative methods of training, managing to form the so-called wonder team.

As a coach he was studious and methodical, having introduced into the CIF the famous "theory of triangulation", which years later came to be implemented in Sporting Clube de Portugal. According to his conceptions of football, Augusto Sabbo argued that players should not make moves according to the circumstances, but rather make a movement that forces the opponent to execute a movement which is of interest to the team, allowing the strategized bursts of play happen as was imagined.

== National coach ==
In 1921, he was chosen to be the first national coach, but the players did not like the hardness of his methods and he ended up not guiding any of the national team's games.

== Time at Sporting CP ==
Sabbo started his time as Sporting's coach in the season 1921/22, probably in January, going on to conquer the third Lisbon Championship in the history of the club, and reaching in the final of the first Portuguese Championship, which Sporting lost in an epic final against FC Porto.

The 1922–23 season was of particular note, leading Sporting to their first Portuguese Championship title, and winning the Lisbon Championship again.

He remained at Sporting until February 1923, when he resigned after the Technical Council denied him the freedom to assemble the team, but returned at the beginning of the following season, resigning again in February 1924.

In 1923, Sabbo edited in Lisbon a detailed 75-page manual titled Football (Técnica e Didáctica de Jogo), which discussed all the important aspects of football.

He would return to Sporting in 1926, becoming the first paid coach of the club. After the attendance of the players to the training sessions dwindled to low levels, the club, seeing itself in a time of crisis, dismissed Sabbo in January 1927.

== "Escola do Barreiro" ==
After his time at Sporting, Sabbo went on to coach Barreirense from the 1926–27 season to the 1929–30, later returning for two stints, the first during the 1933–34 and 1934–35 seasons, and the second during the 1939–40 and 1940–41 seasons. During his stay at Barreirense Sabbo went on to create tactical system entitled "Escola do Barreiro", a system that remained in use at the Barreiro-based club even after his departure. During his tenure he led the team to the Portuguese Championship final twice.

== Life outside coaching ==
In addition to being a football coach he was also a referee and part of Sporting's first rugby teams.

Sabbo died on 30 October 1971 in Lisbon, Portugal, the place of his birth.
