= Fernando Folha =

Portuguese footballer (born 1958)

Personal information
- Full name: Fernando Manuel Parada Folha
- Date of birth: 18 January 1958 (age 68)
- Place of birth: Matosinhos, Portugal
- Position: Forward

Youth career
- 1972–1976: Leixões

Senior career*
Years	Team	Apps	(Gls)
1976–1979	Leixões	53	(13)
1979–1981	Boavista	55	(18)
1981–1982	Benfica	8	(0)
1982–1985	Varzim	78	(17)
1985–1986	Boavista	1	(0)
1986–1987	Beira-Mar		
1987–1988	Trofense		
1988–1989	Felgueiras		
Total		195	(48)

International career
1981	Portugal	1	(0)
- * Club domestic league appearances and goals

Fernando Manuel Parada Folha (born 18 January 1958 in Matosinhos) is a retired Portuguese footballer who played as a forward.
