= Fernando Freitas =

Portuguese footballer

Personal information
- Full name: Fernando José António Freitas Alexandrino
- Date of birth: 21 July 1947 (age 79)
- Place of birth: Benguela, Angola
- Height: 1.83 m (6 ft 0 in)
- Position: Central defender

Senior career*
Years	Team	Apps	(Gls)
1967–1976	Belenenses	215	(2)
1976–1983	FC Porto	133	(0)
1983–1984	Portimonense	25	(0)

International career
1972–1976	Portugal	9	(0)
- * Club domestic league appearances and goals

Fernando José António Freitas Alexandrino (born 21 July 1947 in Benguela) is a former Portuguese footballer. He played as central defender.

== Football career ==
Freitas gained 9 caps for Portugal and made his debut 10 May 1972 in Nicosia against Cyprus, in a 1–0 victory.
