= Reinaldo Gomes =

Portuguese footballer

Reinaldo
Personal information
- Full name: Maurício Zacarias Reinaldo Rodrigues Gomes
- Date of birth: 2 November 1954 (age 71)
- Place of birth: Bissau, Guinea
- Position: Striker

Senior career*
Years	Team	Apps	(Gls)
1973–1974	Vila Real		
1974–1978	Famalicão		
1975–1976	→ Régua (loan)		
1978–1982	Benfica	85	(48)
1982–1984	Boavista	49	(13)
1984–1985	Braga	17	(3)
1985–1986	Estoril	23	(15)
1986–1987	Varzim	10	(0)

International career
1979–1983	Portugal	6	(1)
- * Club domestic league appearances and goals

Maurício Zacarias Reinaldo Rodrigues Gomes (born 2 November 1954), known simply as Reinaldo, is a former Portuguese footballer who played as a striker.

== Club career ==
Born in Bissau, Portuguese Guinea, Reinaldo spent his entire professional career in Portugal. After starting out in the lower leagues with SC Vila Real he played four years in the second division, with F.C. Famalicão and Sport Clube da Régua.

Reinaldo signed for top level giants S.L. Benfica in 1978, as the Lisbon side was coached by English John Mortimore, and wasted no time making an impact alongside legendary Nené, scoring 32 league goals in his first two-season combined and eventually helping Benfica to the conquest of three major titles, including the double in the 1980–81 campaign; his official debut came in a home game against F.C. Barreirense, on 29 August.

After leaving Benfica, with official totals of 116 games and 59 goals, Reinaldo represented Boavista FC, S.C. Braga, G.D. Estoril Praia (division two) and Varzim SC. He retired from football at nearly 33 years of age.

== International career ==
Guinea-born Reinaldo was capped for Portugal six times, scoring one goal. He made his debut in a friendly with Spain in Vigo on 26 September 1979 (1–1 draw), and his last game was on 8 June 1983 in another exhibition game, with Brazil in Coimbra (0–4 defeat).

Reinaldo Gomes: International goals
No.	Date	Venue	Opponent	Score	Result	Competition
1	21 November 1979	Estádio da Luz (1954), Lisbon, Portugal	Austria	1–1	1–2	Euro 1980 qualifying

== Honours ==
Famalicão

- Second Division: 1977–78

Benfica

- Portuguese League: 1980–81
- Portuguese Cup: 1979–80, 1980–81
