= Gabriel Mendes =

Portuguese football manager and former player

Gabriel
Personal information
- Full name: Gabriel Azevedo Mendes
- Date of birth: 30 May 1954 (age 72)
- Place of birth: Miragaia, Portugal
- Position: Right-back

Youth career
- 1969–1973: Porto

Senior career*
| Years | Team | Apps | (Gls) |
| 1973–1983 | Porto | 192 | (5) |
| 1983–1987 | Sporting CP | 79 | (1) |
| 1987–1988 | Covilhã | 9 | (0) |
| 1988–1989 | Ermesinde | | |
| 1991–1992 | Torres Novas | 11 | (0) |
| 1993–1994 | Torres Novas | 10 | (0) |
| Total | | 301 | (6) |

International career
| 1974–1975 | Portugal U21 | 2 | (1) |
| 1979 | Portugal B | 1 | (0) |
| 1977–1982 | Portugal | 20 | (0) |

Managerial career
- 1990: Barreirense
- 1991–1995: Torres Novas
- 1995: Sanjoanense
- 1998–2000: Peniche
- 2000: Feirense
- 2001–2002: Oliveira Bairro
- 2002–2003: Águeda
- * Club domestic league appearances and goals

Gabriel Azevedo Mendes (born 30 May 1954 in Miragaia, Porto), known simply as Gabriel, is a Portuguese retired football right-back and manager.
