= Romeu Silva =

Portuguese footballer and manager

Romeu
Personal information
- Full name: Romeu Fernando Fernandes da Silva
- Date of birth: 4 March 1954 (age 72)
- Place of birth: Vila Praia de Âncora, Portugal
- Position: Midfielder

Youth career
- 1970–1971: Sporting Beira
- 1971–1972: 1° Maio Lourenço Marques
- 1972–1973: Vitória Guimarães

Senior career*
Years	Team	Apps	(Gls)
1973–1975	Vitória Guimarães	63	(13)
1975–1977	Benfica	13	(0)
1977–1979	Vitória Guimarães	48	(8)
1979–1983	Porto	69	(8)
1983–1986	Sporting CP	41	(3)
1986–1987	Salgueiros	18	(0)
1987–1988	Amora		
Total		252	(32)

International career
1974–1982	Portugal	11	(0)

Managerial career
- 1991–1992: Sporting CP (assistant)
- 1992–1994: Vitória Guimarães (assistant)
- 1994: Belenenses (assistant)
- 1994–1995: Torreense
- 1995–1997: Vitória Guimarães (assistant)
- 1996: Vitória Guimarães
- 1997–1998: Sporting CP (assistant)
- 1998–1999: Lourosa
- 2003–2004: Paredes
- 2004–2005: Olivais Moscavide
- 2006: Interclube
- * Club domestic league appearances and goals

Romeu Fernando Fernandes da Silva (born 4 March 1954), known simply as Romeu, is a retired Portuguese footballer who played as a central midfielder.

== Football career ==
Born in Vila Praia de Âncora, Caminha, Viana do Castelo, Romeu made his professional debuts with Vitória de Guimarães, first appearing with the first team not yet aged 19. After a career-best ten goals in 28 matches in 1974–75, he caught the attention of S.L. Benfica, where he would however appear rarely over the course of two Primeira Liga seasons.

After reviving his career with his first club, Romeu moved in 1979 to FC Porto, where he would be much more used than at Benfica, in a four-season spell. The northern side however, only won one Portuguese Supercup, in 1981.

Aged 29, Romeu joined the last of the Big Three, Sporting Clube de Portugal. Except for his debut campaign, he would not be more than a fringe player as the team came totally empty on silverware, and finally retired in 1988 after one-year spells with modest S.C. Salgueiros and Amora FC (the latter in division two).

In the 90s/2000s, Romeu had several spells as a manager, also working with Benfica as a scout and match observer (1999–2001). During eight years, still as a player, he appeared eight times for the Portugal national team.
