= João Alves (footballer, born 1952) =

Portuguese footballer and manager

Personal information
- Full name: João António Ferreira Resende Alves
- Date of birth: 5 December 1952 (age 73)
- Place of birth: Albergaria-a-Velha, Portugal
- Height: 1.74 m (5 ft 9 in)
- Position: Attacking midfielder

Youth career
- 1968–1969: Sanjoanense
- 1969–1972: Benfica

Senior career*
| Years | Team | Apps | (Gls) |
| 1972–1973 | Benfica | 0 | (0) |
| 1972–1973 | → Varzim (loan) | | |
| 1973–1974 | Montijo | 30 | (2) |
| 1974–1976 | Boavista | 59 | (26) |
| 1976–1978 | Salamanca | 64 | (10) |
| 1978–1979 | Benfica | 26 | (11) |
| 1979–1980 | Paris Saint-Germain | 19 | (0) |
| 1980–1983 | Benfica | 71 | (17) |
| 1983–1985 | Boavista | 47 | (3) |
| Total | | 316 | (69) |

International career
| 1974–1983 | Portugal | 36 | (3) |

Managerial career
- 1984–1986: Boavista
- 1988–1990: Estrela Amadora
- 1990: Boavista
- 1991–1992: Vitória Guimarães
- 1992–1994: Estrela Amadora
- 1994–1996: Belenenses
- 1996: Salamanca
- 1996–1997: Boavista
- 1997–1998: Campomaiorense
- 1998–2000: Farense
- 2000–2002: Académica
- 2002–2003: Estrela Amadora
- 2003–2004: Leixões
- 2009–2011: Servette
- 2012: Servette
- 2018–2019: Académica
- 2020: Cova Piedade
- * Club domestic league appearances and goals

João António Ferreira Resende Alves (born 5 December 1952) is a Portuguese football manager and former player.

A skilled attacking midfielder, he was considered one of the best Portuguese players of his generation, and earned the nickname Luvas Pretas from the black gloves he used to wear while playing following in the style of his grandfather Carlos Alves.

During his career he represented mainly, with equal individual and team success, Benfica and Boavista, also coaching the latter club on three occasions.

== Playing career ==
=== Club ===
Born in Albergaria-a-Velha, Aveiro District, Alves started playing at youth level for Sanjoanense, before being recruited in 1969 by Benfica. His first professional team was Varzim in the 1972–73 season, followed by Montijo, the latter being his first Primeira Liga experience.

Alves moved to his first major club, Boavista, for the 1974–75 campaign, where he first showed more of his talent, earning him a transfer to Spain's Salamanca, where he remained two more years. He then returned to Portugal and Benfica, only to move after one year to Paris Saint-Germain.

Failing to impress in France, Alves immediately moved back to the Estádio da Luz, where he would play for the next three seasons. He then re-joined Boavista, ending his career during 1984–85 at the age of 32 to become the latter team's coach.

Alves won two national championships for Benfica (1981 and 1983) and four Portuguese Cups (two for Boavista, in 1975 and 1976, and two with the former side, in 1981 and 1983). He also played for them in the 1982–83 UEFA Cup final, losing on aggregate to Anderlecht of Belgium.

=== International ===
Alves won 36 caps for Portugal (11 for Boavista, eight for Salamanca and 17 for Benfica), scoring three goals. His debut took place on 13 November 1974 in a 0–3 friendly loss to Switzerland, and his final match was on 27 April 1983, in a 0–5 loss against the Soviet Union for the UEFA Euro 1984 qualifiers.

João Alves: International goals
| No. | Date | Venue | Opponent | Score | Result | Competition |
|---|---|---|---|---|---|---|
| 1 | 3 December 1975 | Estádio do Bonfim, Setúbal, Portugal | Cyprus | 1–0 | 1–0 | Euro 1976 qualifying |
| 2 | 30 March 1977 | Estádio dos Barreiros, Funchal, Portugal | Switzerland | 1–0 | 1–0 | Friendly |
| 3 | 9 May 1979 | Ullevaal Stadion, Oslo, Norway | Norway | 0–1 | 0–1 | Euro 1980 qualifying |

== Coaching career ==
Alves became a coach after finishing his player career, managing Boavista on three separate occasions, Estrela Amadora (leading the Amadora team to an historical 1990 Cup of Portugal triumph), Vitória de Guimarães, Belenenses, Salamanca, Campomaiorense, Farense, Académica de Coimbra and Leixões. In 1996–97, he was one of three managers as former side Salamanca returned to La Liga after a second-place finish.

After three years out of coaching, he returned to Benfica in 2007, to be in charge of its under-18 team. Two years later, he returned to senior football, signing with Switzerland's Servette and achieving promotion to the Super League in his second season.

On 28 November 2011, following Swiss Cup elimination at the hands of Biel-Benne (0–3 away loss), Alves was relieved of his duties. However, following poor results achieved by his successor and the club's takeover by Hugh Quennec, he was reinstated as manager in April 2012: in the final five games of the campaign results improved, with the team achieving four wins and one draw – this included a 2–1 win over eventual champions Basel, which ended Servette's streak of 17 consecutive defeats against that opponent as well as ending their 26-match unbeaten run – and the side eventually qualified for the UEFA Europa League.

On 9 October 2018, after six years of inactivity, Alves returned for another spell as Académica coach, with the club now in the LigaPro. He left at the end of the season, and came back to management on 9 January 2020 with Cova da Piedade, last-placed in the same league. They were relegated in May when the campaign was cancelled due to the COVID-19 pandemic, and he openly attacked the Liga Portuguesa de Futebol Profissional for the decision.

== Managerial statistics ==
| Team | From | To | Record | | | | | | | |
| Team | From | To | G | W | D | L | GF | GA | GD | Win % |
|---|---|---|---|---|---|---|---|---|---|---|
| Boavista | August 1990 | November 1990 | 66 | 28 | 16 | 22 | 86 | 69 | +17 | 42.42 |
| Estrela Amadora | July 1988 | June 1990 | 85 | 31 | 25 | 29 | 92 | 83 | +9 | 36.47 |
| Boavista | August 1990 | November 1990 | 12 | 6 | 2 | 4 | 15 | 13 | +2 | 50.00 |
| Vitória Guimarães | January 1991 | May 1992 | 56 | 24 | 15 | 17 | 67 | 61 | +6 | 42.86 |
| Estrela Amadora | July 1993 | May 1994 | 39 | 13 | 15 | 11 | 51 | 41 | +10 | 33.33 |
| Belenenses | October 1994 | May 1996 | 66 | 25 | 15 | 26 | 81 | 67 | +14 | 37.88 |
| Salamanca | July 1996 | September 1996 | 2 | 0 | 1 | 1 | 2 | 3 | −1 | 0.00 |
| Boavista | November 1996 | 12 January 1997 | 7 | 2 | 2 | 3 | 13 | 9 | +4 | 28.57 |
| Campomaiorense | October 1997 | 29 November 1998 | 41 | 12 | 8 | 21 | 62 | 73 | −11 | 29.27 |
| Farense | February 1999 | January 2000 | 28 | 7 | 10 | 11 | 35 | 46 | −11 | 25.00 |
| Académica | December 2000 | 3 December 2002 | 70 | 30 | 20 | 20 | 116 | 100 | +16 | 42.86 |
| Estrela Amadora | 6 March 2003 | 11 November 2003 | 20 | 6 | 5 | 9 | 16 | 31 | −15 | 30.00 |
| Leixões | 5 November 2003 | 12 January 2004 | 7 | 1 | 3 | 3 | 7 | 15 | −8 | 14.29 |
| Servette | 7 October 2009 | 28 November 2011 | 77 | 45 | 13 | 19 | 156 | 84 | +72 | 58.44 |
| Servette | 25 April 2012 | 4 September 2012 | 17 | 6 | 5 | 6 | 17 | 19 | −2 | 35.29 |
| Career totals | | | 593 | 236 | 155 | 202 | 827 | 714 | +113 | 39.80 |

== Honours ==
=== Player ===
Boavista

- Taça de Portugal: 1974–75, 1975–76

Benfica

- Primeira Liga: 1980–81, 1982–83
- Taça de Portugal: 1980–81, 1982–83
- Supertaça Cândido de Oliveira: 1980

=== Manager ===
Estrela da Amadora

- Taça de Portugal: 1989–90
- Segunda Liga: 1992–93

=== Individual ===
- Portuguese Footballer of the Year: 1975
