= 1978–79 S.L. Benfica season =

Benfica
1978–79 season
- President: José Ferreira Queimado
- Head coach: John Mortimore
- Stadium: Estádio da Luz
- Primeira Divisão: 2nd
- Taça de Portugal: Fifth round
- UEFA Cup: Second round
- Top goalscorer: League: Nené (25); All: Nené (28)
Home colours

The 1978–79 season was Sport Lisboa e Benfica's 75th season in existence and the club's 45th consecutive season in the top flight of Portuguese football, covering the period from 1 July 1978 to 30 June 1979. Benfica competed domestically in the Primeira Divisão and the Taça de Portugal, and participated in the UEFA Cup after finishing second in the previous league.

After narrowly missing out on the fourth consecutive title, Benfica signed João Alves, plus Reinaldo Gomes and Carlos Alhinho. They let go of Vítor Baptista and three others. In the league, a poor start with three losses in a month, severely hindered the title race. Nevertheless, despite dropping out of the UEFA Cup at the hands of Borussia Mönchengladbach, domestically, Benfica won all league matches for three months, reaching the first place in the league. A home draw with Porto stopped their winning run, but it was a loss to Marítimo that compromised their title race. That loss followed another with Braga for the Taça de Portugal. Despite dropping points again in March, Benfica kept an entertaining battle with Porto, which came to an end when they drew again in match-day 29. Two consecutive seasons without winning the Primeira Divisão was unprecedented since 1959.

== Season summary ==
Benfica came on in the new season after barely missing the "Tetra", the fourth league title in a row, when they match Porto's 51 points but had worse goal-average. This led the members to change a long time rule about only signing Portuguese players. On 1 July 1978, in a members meet, that rule was removed. According to the press, the first foreign approached was Paul Mariner, but it did not pan out. Benfica did made the biggest signing of the window, when they brought on João Alves from Spain. Other signings included Reinaldo Gomes and the return of Carlos Alhinho. Major departures included Vítor Baptista, but also Celso Pita and Vítor Martins, both due to career-ending injuries. Benfica also replaced assistant manager Rui Silva for Peres Bandeira. The pre-season began on 31 July, and Benfica first competed in the inaugural Feyenoord Tournament with Feyenoord and Club Brugge, before making their presentation game with Nacional Montevideo on 16 August. They ended the pre-season with two friendlies with Salamanca and Molenbeek, due to obligations related to the transfers of João Alves and Carlos Alhinho.

Benfica started their league campaign with win against Barreirense, before they faced Porto in the Clássico. On the Estádio das Antas, Benfica lost 1–0, but John Mortimore said the loss could prove to be a good thing. The loss put an end to a 56–game undefeated streak in the competition that dated back to 3 October 1976. However, Mortimore saw his team lose again on match-day 3, on a visit to Bonfim to play Vitória de Setúbal. They reacted with a win against Braga, only to lose again in their next away visit. In Estádio do Restelo, Benfica was defeated one-nil by Belenenses. It was their third loss in the first month of competition. In their first ever UEFA Cup participation, Benfica fared better and eliminated Nantes in the first round. In the following round, Borussia Mönchengladbach, beat them 2–0 in Germany and eliminate them. Still, October was a fruitful month for Benfica, as they started a winning run that extended three months. They reached top of the league with the same points as Porto, after a 5–0 win against Sporting. It was the largest win against them since the 7–2 in 1946. On the following match-day, an away win with Vitória de Guimarães propelled Benfica into isolated first place with 16 points, one more than Porto. Benfica winning run ended on 21 January with a 1–1 draw against Porto on match-day 17. Mortimore complained of a three-meter off-side in Porto's goal. It left Porto in a lead with a game more, because Benfica's match against Académico de Viseu on 30 December had to be postponed due to stormy weather. In February, Benfica was knocked-out of the Portuguese Cup with a 2–1 loss with Braga, a defeat that Mortimore rated as fair.

A week later, another defeat, now for the Primeira Divisão. Benfica lost 2–1 in Barreiros to Máritimo and was now two points behind Porto, but still with one game less. After winning the game in hand, Benfica matched Porto again at the front, but let them slip again after dropping points in the following game. A visit to Varzim, where they drew 1–1. Benfica responded with several consecutive wins, including one in Estádio de Alvalade, with a goal from João Alves. As Benfica entered June, they were still neck and neck with Porto, but with a disadvantage in the head-to-head. In second-to-last match-day, Benfica dropped points in Aveiro in a 0–0 draw with Beira-Mar and practically handed the title to Porto, who gained a point with one match left. A week later, Benfica won, but so did Porto, who confirmed their back-to-back league title with 50 points, one more than Benfica. About the season, Mortimore said: "What a beautiful championship, with an appealing fight between Benfica and Porto. They (Porto) ended up being Champions because in the matches against us, they racked-up three points. But that was not the reason why he lost it. It was the poor results with Belenenses, Setúbal and Marítimo.". Two seasons without any honour was not seen since 1948, and two years without a league title not since 1959.

== Competitions ==
Win Draw Loss Postponed

=== Overall record ===
| Competition | First match | Last match | Record | | | | | | | | |
| Competition | First match | Last match | G | W | D | L | GF | GA | GD | Win % | Source |
|---|---|---|---|---|---|---|---|---|---|---|---|
| Primeira Divisão | 28 August 1978 | 17 June 1979 | 30 | 23 | 3 | 4 | 75 | 21 | +54 | 76.67 | |
| Taça de Portugal | 14 January 1979 | 25 February 1979 | 3 | 2 | 0 | 1 | 8 | 2 | +6 | 66.67 | |
| UEFA Cup | 13 September 1978 | 1 November 1978 | 4 | 1 | 2 | 1 | 2 | 2 | +0 | 25.00 | |
| Total | | | 37 | 26 | 5 | 6 | 85 | 25 | +60 | 70.27 | |

=== Primeira Divisão ===
==== League table ====
| Pos | Team | Pld | W | D | L | GF | GA | GD | Pts | Qualification or relegation |
|---|---|---|---|---|---|---|---|---|---|---|
| 1 | Porto (C) | 30 | 21 | 8 | 1 | 70 | 19 | +51 | 50 | Qualification to European Cup first round |
| 2 | Benfica | 30 | 23 | 3 | 4 | 75 | 21 | +54 | 49 | Qualification to UEFA Cup first round |
| 3 | Sporting CP | 30 | 17 | 8 | 5 | 46 | 22 | +24 | 42 | Qualification to UEFA Cup first round |
| 4 | Braga | 30 | 16 | 5 | 9 | 49 | 35 | +14 | 37 | |
| 5 | Varzim | 30 | 11 | 10 | 9 | 30 | 29 | +1 | 32 | |

Source: RSSSF and footballzz.co.uk
(C) Champions

==== Results by round ====
| Round | 1 | 2 | 3 | 4 | 5 | 6 | 7 | 8 | 9 | 10 | 11 | 12 | 13 | 14 | 15 | 16 | 17 | 18 | 19 | 20 | 21 | 22 | 23 | 24 | 25 | 26 | 27 | 28 | 29 | 30 |
|---|---|---|---|---|---|---|---|---|---|---|---|---|---|---|---|---|---|---|---|---|---|---|---|---|---|---|---|---|---|---|
| Ground | H | A | A | H | A | H | A | H | A | H | A | H | A | H | A | A | H | H | A | H | A | H | A | H | A | H | A | H | A | H |
| Result | W | L | L | W | L | W | W | W | W | W | W | W | W | W | W | W | D | W | W | W | L | W | D | W | W | W | W | W | D | W |
| Position | 6 | 8 | 11 | 10 | 11 | 7 | 7 | 4 | 2 | 1 | 1 | 1 | 1 | 1 | 1 | 1 | 1 | 1 | 1 | 1 | 1 | 1 | 2 | 1 | 1 | 1 | 1 | 1 | 2 | 2 |

Source: ForaDeJogo
A = Away; H = Home; W = Win; D = Draw; L = Loss

==== Matches ====
| 28 August 1978 1 | Benfica | 1–0 | Barreirense | Lisbon |
| 19:00 | Rui Lopes 73' | Report | | Stadium: Estádio da Luz; Referee: António Espanhol |

| 1 September 1978 2 | Porto | 1–0 | Benfica | Porto |
| 20:00 | Costa 57' | Report | | Stadium: Estádio das Antas; Referee: António Garrido |

| 10 September 1978 3 | Vitória de Setúbal | 2–1 | Benfica | Setúbal |
| 18:00 | Narciso 33'; Vítor Madeira 50' | Report | Pietra 48' | Stadium: Estádio do Bonfim; Referee: Porém Luís |

| 17 September 1978 4 | Benfica | 2–0 | Braga | Lisbon |
| 18:00 | Reinaldo 1'; Nené 40' | Report | | Stadium: Estádio da Luz; Referee: César Correia |

| 25 September 1978 5 | Belenenses | 1–0 | Benfica | Lisbon |
| 18:00 | Vasques 44' | Report | | Stadium: Estádio do Restelo; Referee: Inácio Almeida |

| 16 October 1978 6 | Benfica | 3–1 | Marítimo | Lisbon |
| 18:00 | Chalana 21'; Reinaldo 60'; Humberto Coelho 70' | Report | Valter Costa 15' | Stadium: Estádio da Luz; Referee: António Rodrigues |

| 23 October 1978 7 | Académica de Coimbra | 0–2 | Benfica | Coimbra |
| 18:00 | | Report | Reinaldo 2'; João Alves 35' | Stadium: Estádio Municipal de Coimbra; Referee: Fernando Alberto |

| 28 October 1978 8 | Benfica | 3–0 | Varzim | Lisbon |
| 20:00 | João Alves 18'; Nené 35', 75' | Report | | Stadium: Estádio da Luz; Referee: Santos Luís |

| 5 November 1978 9 | Boavista | 0–1 | Benfica | Porto |
| 20:00 | | Report | Nené 51' | Stadium: Estádio do Bessa; Referee: Alder Dante |

| 19 November 1978 10 | Benfica | 5–0 | Sporting | Lisbon |
| 19:00 | Reinaldo 15', 28'; Nené 18'; João Alves 30', 40' (pen.) | Report | | Stadium: Estádio da Luz; Referee: Armando Paraty |

| 3 December 1978 11 | Vitória de Guimarães | 1–2 | Benfica | Guimarães |
| 18:00 | Abreu 59' (pen.) | Report | João Alves 44' (pen.); Reinaldo 78' | Stadium: Estádio D. Afonso Henriques; Referee: Mário Luís |

| 10 December 1978 12 | Benfica | 5–1 | Estoril Praia | Lisbon |
| 19:30 | Shéu 20'; João Alves 41'; Nené 55', 84'; Reinaldo 74' | Report | Fonseca 71' | Stadium: Estádio da Luz; Referee: Raúl Nazaré |

| 17 December 1978 13 | Famalicão | 0–1 | Benfica | Vila Nova de Famalicão |
| 18:30 | | Report | Nené 15' | Stadium: Estádio Municipal 22 de Junho; Referee: Evaristo Faustino |

| 23 December 1978 14 | Benfica | 5–1 | Beira-Mar | Lisbon |
| 19:00 | Reinaldo 14', 69'; Nené 23', 73'; Quaresma 78' (o.g.) | Report | Niromar 49' | Stadium: Estádio da Luz; Referee: Américo Barradas |

| 30 December 1978 (Note: Postponed at the 35 minute mark, with result 1–0 for Benfica due to heavy rains) 15 | Académico de Viseu | Postponed | Benfica | Viseu |
| | | Report | | Stadium: Estádio do Fontelo |

| 7 January 1979 16 | Barreirense | 0–4 | Benfica | Barreiro |
| 18:00 | | Report | Shéu 27'; Nené 38'; Humberto Coelho 65'; João Alves 70' (pen.) | Stadium: Campo D. Manuel de Melo; Referee: António Garrido |

| 21 January 1979 17 | Benfica | 1–1 | Porto | Lisbon |
| 20:00 | João Alves 21' (pen.) | Report | Duda 31' | Stadium: Estádio da Luz; Referee: Porém Luís |

| 28 January 1979 18 | Benfica | 2–0 | Vitória de Setúbal | Lisbon |
| 19:00 | Nené 60'; Shéu 70' | Report | | Stadium: Estádio da Luz; Referee: Manuel Poeira |

| 11 February 1979 19 | Braga | 0–2 | Benfica | Braga |
| 19:00 | | Report | Humberto Coelho 2'; Chalana 61' | Stadium: Estádio 1º de Maio; Referee: Santos Luís |

| 18 February 1979 20 | Benfica | 2–1 | Belenenses | Lisbon |
| 18:00 | Reinaldo 34'; Humberto Coelho 69' | Report | Carlos Pereira 84' | Stadium: Estádio da Luz; Referee: Albino Rodrigues |

| 2 March 1979 21 | Marítimo | 2–1 | Benfica | Funchal |
| 19:00 | China 16'; Arnaldo Silva 33' | Report | Jorge Silva 75' | Stadium: Estádio dos Barreiros; Referee: Evaristo Faustino |

| 7 March 1978 15 | Académico de Viseu | 2–6 | Benfica | Viseu |
| 18:00 | Penteado 65'; Vinagre 88' | Report | Humberto Coelho 5'; José Freixo 31' (o.g.); Jorge Silva 63', 70'; Nené 79', 90' | Stadium: Estádio do Fontelo; Referee: César Correia |

| 11 March 1979 22 | Benfica | 6–1 | Académica de Coimbra | Lisbon |
| 19:00 | Nené 7', 43', 60', 65', 89'; João Alves 47' | Report | Eldon 48' | Stadium: Estádio da Luz; Referee: José Luís Tavares |

| 23 March 1979 23 | Varzim | 1–1 | Benfica | Póvoa de Varzim |
| 18:00 | Montóia 75' | Report | Reinaldo 61' | Stadium: Estádio do Varzim SC; Referee: Inácio Almeida |

| 1 April 1979 24 | Benfica | 3–0 | Boavista | Lisbon |
| 18:00 | Reinaldo 6', 70'; Nené 58' | Report | | Stadium: Estádio da Luz; Referee: Mário Luís |

| 8 April 1979 25 | Sporting | 0–1 | Benfica | Lisbon |
| 20:00 | | Report | João Alves 52' (pen.) | Stadium: Estádio de Alvalade; Referee: Raúl Nazaré |

| 13 May 1979 26 | Benfica | 3–2 | Vitória de Guimarães | Lisbon |
| 20:00 | Reinaldo 28'; Nené 30'; Humberto Coelho 77' | Report | Mané 14'; Almiro 78' | Stadium: Estádio da Luz; Referee: César Correia |

| 27 May 1979 27 | Estoril Praia | 0–2 | Benfica | Estoril |
| 19:00 | | Report | Reinaldo 55'; Peixoto 60' (o.g.) | Stadium: Estádio António Coimbra da Mota; Referee: Rosa Santos |

| 4 June 1979 28 | Benfica | 5–3 | Famalicão | Lisbon |
| 18:00 | Reinaldo 9'; Chalana 35'; João Alves 37'; Humberto Coelho 56'; Nené 59' | Report | José Albino 3' (pen.); António Duarte 82'; Acácio 87' | Stadium: Estádio da Luz; Referee: Ezequiel Feijão |

| 10 June 1979 29 | Beira-Mar | 0–0 | Benfica | Aveiro |
| 19:00 | | Report | | Stadium: Estádio Mário Duarte; Referee: Mário Luís |

| 17 June 1979 30 | Benfica | 5–0 | Académico de Viseu | Lisbon |
| 20:00 | Nené 23', 30' (pen.); Reinaldo 61'; Pereirinha 76' | Report | | Stadium: Estádio da Luz; Referee: Castro e Sousa |

=== Taça de Portugal ===
| 14 January 1979 Third Rd | Benfica | 3–0 | Aliados Lordelo | Lisbon |
| 19:00 | Jorge Silva 5'; Nené 42'; Diamantino 50' | Report | | Stadium: Estádio da Luz; Attendance: 25,000; Referee: Alder Dante |

| 4 February 1979 Fourth Rd | Benfica | 4–0 | Beira-Mar | Lisbon |
| 19:00 | João Alves 22'; Humberto Coelho 30'; Nené 42'; Toni 73' | Report | | Stadium: Estádio da Luz; Attendance: 30,000; Referee: António Garrido |

| 25 February 1979 Fifth Rd | Braga | 2–1 | Benfica | Braga |
| 19:00 | Chico Gordo 65'; Fontes 82' | Report | Artur 22' (o.g.) | Stadium: Estádio 1º de Maio; Attendance: 10,000; Referee: António Garrido |

=== UEFA Cup ===
==== First round ====
| 13 September 1978 First Leg | Nantes | 0–2 | Benfica | Nantes |
| 20:30 | | Report | Chalana 38' (pen.); Nené 41' | Stadium: Stade de la Beaujoire; Attendance: 30,000; Referee: Alexis Ponnet |

| 27 September 1978 Second leg | Benfica | 0–0 (2–0 agg.) | Nantes | Lisbon |
| 21:30 | | Report | | Stadium: Estádio da Luz; Attendance: 30,000; Referee: Paul Kindervater |

==== Second round ====
| 18 October 1978 First leg | Benfica | 0–0 | Borussia Mönchengladbach | Lisbon |
| 21:30 | | Report | | Stadium: Estádio da Luz; Attendance: 30,000; Referee: Charles Corver |

| 1 November 1978 Second Leg | Borussia Mönchengladbach | 2–0 (a.e.t.) (2–0 agg.) | Benfica | Mönchengladbach |
| 19:30 | Bruns 95'; Klinkhammer 119' | Report | | Stadium: Bökelbergstadion; Attendance: 30,000; Referee: Clive Thomas |

=== Friendlies ===
| 11 August 1978 Feyenoord TM | Feyenoord | 2–0 | Benfica | Rotterdam |
| | Wim van Til 9'; Peter Houtman 56' | | | Stadium: De Kuip; Referee: Jan Keizer |

| 13 August 1978 Feyenoord TM | Benfica | 6–0 | Club Brugge | Rotterdam |
| | Reinaldo; Pietra; Humberto Coelho; Shéu | | | Stadium: De Kuip |

| 16 August 1978 | Benfica | 2–0 | Nacional Montevideo | Lisbon |
| | Humberto Coelho 44'; Reinaldo 67' | | | Stadium: Estádio da Luz; Referee: Augusto Bailão |

| 20 August 1978 | Salamanca | 0–2 | Benfica | Villares de la Reina |
| | | | Reinaldo; Nené | Stadium: Helmántico Stadium; Referee: Balsa Ron |

| 22 August 1978 | Molenbeek | 1–1 | Benfica | Molenbeek-Saint-Jean |
| | Erik Jensen | | Humberto Coelho |

| 13 January 1979 75Y Anniversary | Benfica | 1–1 | Nantes | Lisbon |
| | | | | Stadium: Estádio da Luz |

| 18 March 1979 | Farense | 0–2 | Benfica | Faro |
| | | | Jorge Silva; João Alves | Stadium: Estádio de São Luís |

| 12 April 1979 Taça de Honra | Belenenses | 0–0 (3–4 p) | Benfica | Lisbon |
| | | | | Stadium: Estádio do Restelo; Referee: Joaquim Carvalho |
| | Penalties |
| | Sambinha (penalty missed); Vasques (penalty missed) |

| 17 April 1979 Taça de Honra | Benfica | 2–1 (a.e.t.) | Sporting | Lisbon |
| | Nené 59'; Cavungi 115' | | Rui Jordão 7' | Stadium: Estádio do Restelo; Referee: Cepa Santos |

| 20 May 1979 | Rio Ave | 1–2 | Benfica | Vila do Conde |
| | | | | Stadium: Estádio dos Arcos |

| 12 June 1979 Paris TM | Benfica | 2–0 | Brazil Olympic | Paris |
| | Reinaldo 11'; Toni 89' | | | Stadium: Parc des Princes |

| 14 June 1979 Paris TM | Benfica | 4–0 | Red Star | Paris |
| | Reinaldo 28', 50'; Nené 79'; Toni 81' | | | Stadium: Parc des Princes |

| 23 June 1979 Trofeo Ibérico | Betis | 1–5 | Benfica | Badajoz |
| | Hugo Cabezas 31' | | Reinaldo 57'; Pietra 60'; Nené 73' | Stadium: Estadio El Vivero |

| 24 June 1979 Trofeo Ibérico | Sporting de Gijón | 4–2 (a.e.t.) | Benfica | Badajoz |
| | Abel Díez 72'; Quini 89' (pen.), 114'; Enzo Ferrero 95' | | Humberto Coelho 30'; Reinaldo 37' | Stadium: Estadio El Vivero |

== Player statistics ==
The squad for the season consisted of the players listed in the tables below, as well as staff member John Mortimore (manager), Peres Bandeira (assistant manager).

Note 1: Note: Flags indicate national team as defined under FIFA eligibility rules. Players may hold more than one non-FIFA nationality.

Note 2: Players with squad numbers marked ‡ joined the club during the 1978-79 season via transfer, with more details in the following section.

| No. | Pos | Nat | Player | Total | | Primeira Divisão | | Taça de Portugal | | UEFA Cup | |
| No. | Pos | Nat | Player | Apps | Goals | Apps | Goals | Apps | Goals | Apps | Goals |
|---|---|---|---|---|---|---|---|---|---|---|---|
| 1 | GK | (Portugal) POR | Manuel Bento | 36 | 0 | 29 | 0 | 3 | 0 | 4 | 0 |
| 1 | GK | (Portugal) POR | José Henrique | 3 | 0 | 3 | 0 | 0 | 0 | 0 | 0 |
| 1 | GK | (Portugal) POR | António Fidalgo | 1 | 0 | 0 | 0 | 1 | 0 | 0 | 0 |
| 2 | DF | (Portugal) POR | Minervino Pietra | 23 | 1 | 19 | 1 | 1 | 0 | 3 | 0 |
| 2 | DF | (Portugal) POR | Alberto Fonseca | 31 | 0 | 24 | 0 | 3 | 0 | 4 | 0 |
| 3 | DF | (Portugal) POR | Humberto Coelho | 35 | 8 | 29 | 7 | 2 | 1 | 4 | 0 |
| 4 | DF | (Portugal) POR | Eurico Gomes | 22 | 0 | 16 | 0 | 2 | 0 | 4 | 0 |
| 4^{‡} | DF | (Portugal) POR | Carlos Alhinho | 33 | 0 | 27 | 0 | 2 | 0 | 4 | 0 |
| 4 | DF | (Portugal) POR | Joaquim Pereirinha | 18 | 1 | 14 | 1 | 1 | 0 | 3 | 0 |
| 5 | DF | (Portugal) POR | António Bastos Lopes | 31 | 0 | 26 | 0 | 3 | 0 | 2 | 0 |
| 5 | MF | (Portugal) POR | Mário Wilson | 5 | 0 | 3 | 0 | 1 | 0 | 1 | 0 |
| 5 | MF | (Portugal) POR | Adriano Spencer | 1 | 0 | 0 | 0 | 1 | 0 | 0 | 0 |
| 6 | MF | (Portugal) POR | Joaquim Simões | 1 | 0 | 0 | 0 | 1 | 0 | 0 | 0 |
| 6 | MF | (Portugal) POR | Toni | 33 | 1 | 27 | 0 | 2 | 1 | 4 | 0 |
| 7 | FW | (Portugal) POR | Nené | 37 | 28 | 30 | 25 | 3 | 2 | 4 | 1 |
| 8^{‡} | FW | (Portugal) POR | Reinaldo Gomes | 34 | 17 | 29 | 17 | 2 | 0 | 3 | 0 |
| 8^{‡} | MF | (Portugal) POR | João Alves | 32 | 12 | 26 | 11 | 2 | 1 | 4 | 0 |
| 9 | FW | (Portugal) POR | Rui Lopes | 7 | 1 | 5 | 1 | 0 | 0 | 2 | 0 |
| 9 | FW | (Portugal) POR | Jorge Silva | 8 | 4 | 6 | 3 | 2 | 1 | 0 | 0 |
| 9 | FW | (Portugal) POR | João Santos | 1 | 0 | 0 | 0 | 1 | 0 | 0 | 0 |
| 10 | MF | (Portugal) POR | Fernando Chalana | 33 | 4 | 30 | 3 | 2 | 0 | 1 | 1 |
| 11 | MF | (Portugal) POR | Shéu | 36 | 3 | 30 | 3 | 2 | 0 | 4 | 0 |
| 11 | FW | (Portugal) POR | Cavungi | 9 | 0 | 8 | 0 | 1 | 0 | 0 | 0 |
| 11 | FW | (Portugal) POR | Diamantino Miranda | 1 | 1 | 0 | 0 | 1 | 1 | 0 | 0 |

== Transfers ==
=== In ===
| Entry date | Position | Player | From club | Fee | Ref |
|---|---|---|---|---|---|
| 14 April 1978 | DF | Carlos Alhinho | Molenbeek | Undisclosed | |
| 27 April 1978 | MF | João Alves | Salamanca | Undisclosed | |
| 28 June 1978 | FW | Reinaldo Gomes | Famalicão | Undisclosed | |

=== Out ===
| Exit date | Position | Player | To club | Fee | Ref |
|---|---|---|---|---|---|
| 8 April 1978 | FW | Vítor Baptista | Vitória de Setúbal | Free | |
| 14 April 1978 | DF | António Barros | Boavista | Free | |
| 22 July 1978 | FW | Celso Pita | None | Retired | |
| 28 July 1978 | MF | Vítor Martins | None | Retired | |

=== Out by loan ===
| Exit date | Position | Player | To club | Return date | Ref |
|---|---|---|---|---|---|
| 18 July 1978 | FW | Orlando Fonseca | Estoril Praia | 30 June 1979 | |
