= 1977–78 S.L. Benfica season =

Benfica
1977–78 season
- President: José Ferreira Queimado
- Head coach: John Mortimore
- Stadium: Estádio da Luz
- Primeira Divisão: 2nd
- Taça de Portugal: Quarter-finals
- European Cup: Quarter-finals
- Top goalscorer: League: Nené (12); All: Nené (21)
Home colours

The 1977–78 season was Sport Lisboa e Benfica's 74th season in existence and the club's 44th consecutive season in the top flight of Portuguese football, covering the period from 1 July 1977 to 30 June 1978. Benfica competed domestically in the Primeira Divisão and the Taça de Portugal, and participated in the European Cup after winning the previous league.

After John Mortimore secured the third consecutive league title, Benfica strengthened their squad with Humberto Coelho. Still, they lost players like Nelinho, Artur Correia and Carlos Alhinho. In the league, Benfica campaign started with a draw against Sporting on 3 September, but they won all remaining matches in that month. They drew again in October, before racking up seven consecutive wins that propelled them to first place. In Europe, they knocked-out Torpedo Moscow and Boldklubben 1903 in the first two rounds. Domestically, the second half of the season was not so dominant. They allowed themselves to be caught by Porto at the top of the table and were knocked of the Portuguese Cup by Sporting and the European Cup by Liverpool. In the final stages of the Primeira Divisão, Benfica intertwined wins with draws and were overtaken by Porto. The decisive Clássico in May, Porto secured a 1–1 draw after trailing most of the game, putting them on the course to win the league. Two weeks later, an unbeaten Benfica came second to Porto due to a 15 goal deficit.

== Season summary ==
Benfica started the new season as three time Champion for the second time in the decade. In the transfer window, Benfica brought back Humberto Coelho and others like Celso Pita. Departing players included Nelinho, Artur Correia and Carlos Alhinho. One of biggest sagas of the transfer window was the return of Rui Jordão to Portugal, which Benfica approached to re-sign, but the player refused and insisted on going to rivals Sporting. The pre-season began on 1 August, without Humberto and Toni, who were still competing in the United States. The training sessions were mostly spent around Monsanto, and the first preparation game was on 11 August with Portimonense in Estádio do Jamor. Afterwards they travelled to Seville to take part in the Trofeo Ciudad de Sevilla, with Sevilla and Vasas.

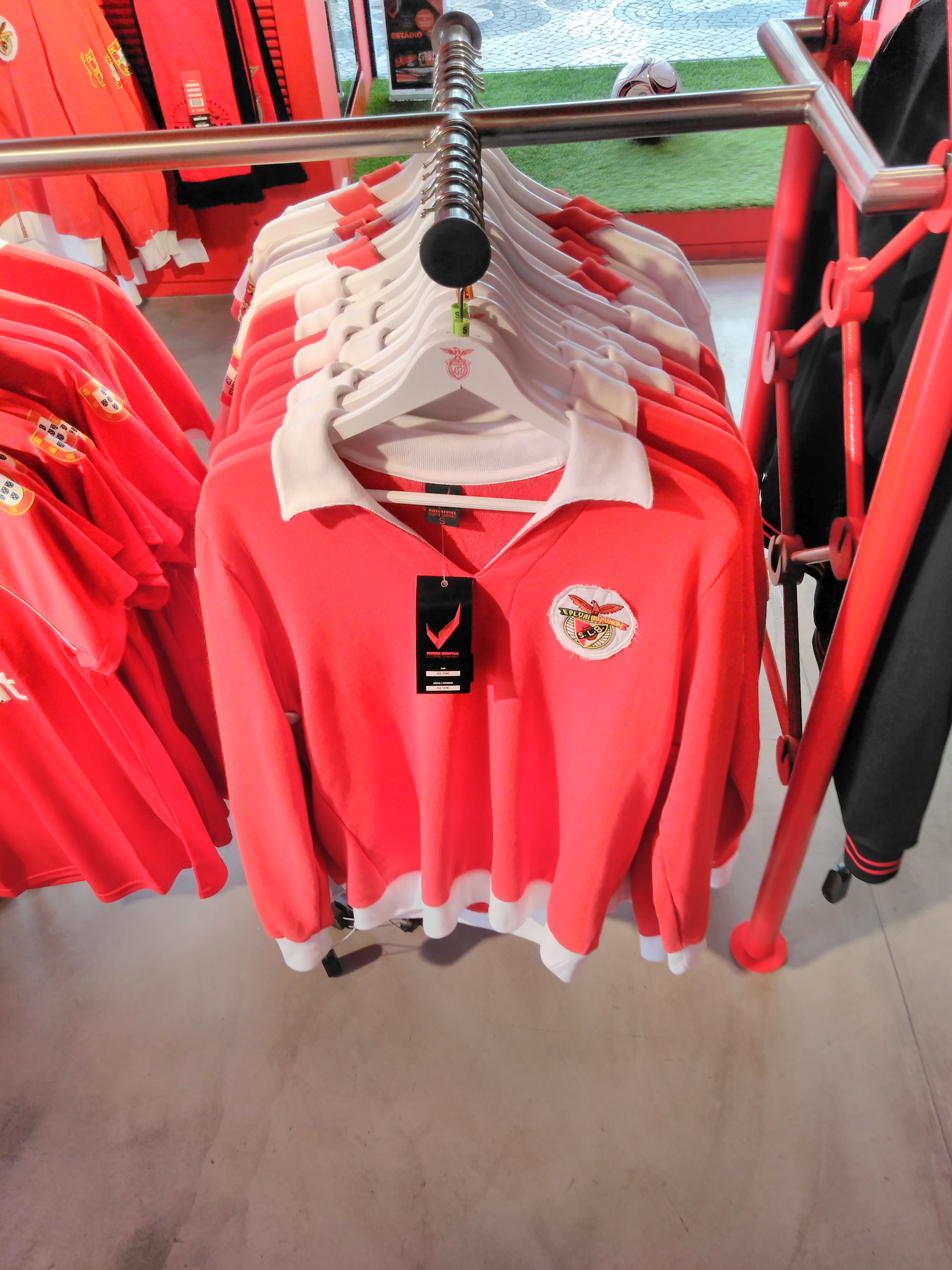
A replica of the shirt used in this time period

Benfica started defending their league title on 3 September in the Lisbon derby with Sporting. They drew 1–1 with Jordão starting for Sporting and Humberto for Benfica. Throughout the month, Benfica won all remaining league matches and finished the month in first place. In the European Cup, they progressed to the second round after beating Torpedo Moscow on penalties, with Bento making an important contribution. In the opening league game of October, Benfica drew in Bessa with Boavista and was caught by Vitória de Guimarães in first, both with 8 points. Four days later, Benfica met Boldklubben 1903 for the second round of the European Cup, beating them with a goal from Pietra. Pietra would also score in Denmark, helping Benfica qualify for the quarter-finals. Meanwhile, domestically, after the draw in Bessa, Benfica won all remaining league matches in 1977, finishing the year in first with 21 points, four more than Sporting and Porto, who still had a game in hand. They resumed their league campaign with the reception to Porto in the Clássico on 15 January. They drew 0–0 and kept Porto at bay, retaining a two-point lead over them. Benfica won the next three matches, one of them a Derby against Sporting with a goal from Vítor Baptista, who subsequently lost an earring, an episode he was best remembered. On 19 February, in a visit to Estádio do Restelo, Benfica drew 0–0 with Belenenses and lost a point to Porto, reducing their lead to a single point.

Benfica began March with a home loss to Liverpool in the first leg of the quarter-finals of the European Cup. Four days later, they were knocked-out of the Portuguese Cup by Sporting, with a 3–1 loss. It was the third consecutive year that Sporting had eliminated them from the competition. On 12 March, they dropped points in the league again, in another 0–0, now with Varzim. This result put Benfica at risk of being caught in the top of the table by Porto, which had a game in hand. Three days later, Benfica lost 4–1 in Anfield Road and were eliminated of the European Cup. Toni said the result expressed the difference between both teams. Back at domestic competition, Benfica regained their footing and won the following two matches. However, on 8 April, they drew again, at home with Portimonense and fell to second, a point from Porto. They responded with two more wins, before conceding another draw, the eight all season, against Braga. This opened Porto's lead to two points with five matches to go. As they had done before, Benfica reacted and won two more matches, one them in Bonfim, where Bento was sent-off. This allowed them to reduce Porto's lead to a point, after their rivals had slipped. This made the visit to Estádio das Antas on 28 May, a title defining match. On that day, Benfica scored first on the 3rd minute with Porto levelling it on the 83rd minute, thus keeping them at the front. From the match, Toni said "It was the divine providence that saved Porto". In the second-to-last match, Porto drew away and Benfica won, which tied both teams with the same points, although Porto remained leader with a better goal-average. On the final match-day, Benfica won, but so did Porto, which celebrated their first title in 19 years. Despite going unbeaten all season and only conceding 11 goals, they had lost the title by a 15-goal deficit.

== Competitions ==
Win Draw Loss Postponed

=== Overall record ===
| Competition | First match | Last match | Record | | | | | | | | |
| Competition | First match | Last match | G | W | D | L | GF | GA | GD | Win % | Source |
|---|---|---|---|---|---|---|---|---|---|---|---|
| Primeira Divisão | 3 September 1977 | 11 June 1978 | 30 | 21 | 9 | 0 | 56 | 11 | +45 | 70.00 | |
| Taça de Portugal | 13 November 1977 | 5 March 1978 | 5 | 4 | 0 | 1 | 23 | 5 | +18 | 80.00 | |
| European Cup | 14 September 1977 | 15 March 1978 | 6 | 2 | 2 | 2 | 4 | 6 | −2 | 33.33 | |
| Total | | | 41 | 27 | 11 | 3 | 83 | 22 | +61 | 65.85 | |

=== Primeira Divisão ===
==== League table ====
| Pos | Team | Pld | W | D | L | GF | GA | GD | Pts | Qualification or relegation |
|---|---|---|---|---|---|---|---|---|---|---|
| 1 | Porto (C) | 30 | 22 | 7 | 1 | 81 | 21 | +60 | 51 | Qualification to European Cup first round |
| 2 | Benfica | 30 | 21 | 9 | 0 | 56 | 11 | +45 | 51 | Qualification to UEFA Cup first round |
| 3 | Sporting CP | 30 | 19 | 4 | 7 | 63 | 30 | +33 | 42 | Qualification to Cup Winners' Cup first round (Note: Sporting qualified for the Cup Winners' Cup as winners of the 1978 Taça de Portugal Final.) |
| 4 | Braga | 30 | 16 | 6 | 8 | 42 | 27 | +15 | 38 | Qualification to UEFA Cup first round |
| 5 | Belenenses | 30 | 14 | 8 | 8 | 25 | 21 | +4 | 36 | |

Source: RSSSF and footballzz.co.uk
Rules for classification: 1) points; 2) goal difference; 3) number of goals scored.
(C) Champions

==== Results by round ====
| Round | 1 | 2 | 3 | 4 | 5 | 6 | 7 | 8 | 9 | 10 | 11 | 12 | 13 | 14 | 15 | 16 | 17 | 18 | 19 | 20 | 21 | 22 | 23 | 24 | 25 | 26 | 27 | 28 | 29 | 30 |
|---|---|---|---|---|---|---|---|---|---|---|---|---|---|---|---|---|---|---|---|---|---|---|---|---|---|---|---|---|---|---|
| Ground | A | H | A | H | A | H | A | H | H | A | H | A | H | A | H | H | A | H | A | H | A | H | A | A | H | A | H | A | H | A |
| Result | D | W | W | W | D | W | W | W | W | D | W | W | D | W | W | W | D | W | D | W | W | D | W | W | D | W | W | D | W | W |
| Position | 7 | 3 | 3 | 1 | 3 | 2 | 1 | 1 | 1 | 1 | 1 | 1 | 1 | 1 | 1 | 1 | 1 | 1 | 2 | 2 | 2 | 2 | 2 | 2 | 2 | 2 | 2 | 2 | 2 | 2 |

Source: ForaDeJogo
A = Away; H = Home; W = Win; D = Draw; L = Loss

==== Matches ====
| 3 September 1977 1 | Sporting | 1–1 | Benfica | Lisbon |
| 17:00 | Fraguito 20' | Report | Chalana 7' | Stadium: Estádio de Alvalade; Referee: Guilherme Alves |

| 10 September 1977 2 | Benfica | 2–0 | Belenenses | Lisbon |
| 18:00 | Vítor Baptista 26' (pen.); Chalana 33' | Report | | Stadium: Estádio da Luz; Referee: César Correia |

| 18 September 1977 3 | Vitória de Guimarães | 0–1 | Benfica | Guimarães |
| 18:00 | | Report | Bastos Lopes 78' | Stadium: Estádio D. Afonso Henriques; Referee: Raúl Nazaré |

| 24 September 1977 4 | Benfica | 2–1 | Varzim | Lisbon |
| 19:00 | Pietra 3', 78' | Report | Marques 44' | Stadium: Estádio da Luz; Referee: Francisco Lobo |

| 15 October 1977 5 | Boavista | 1–1 | Benfica | Porto |
| 20:00 | Artur Ferreira 74' (pen.) | Report | Chalana 26' | Stadium: Estádio do Bessa; Referee: Castro de Sousa |

| 23 October 1977 6 | Benfica | 2–0 | Espinho | Lisbon |
| 19:00 | José Luís 5' (pen.); Celso 30' | Report | | Stadium: Estádio da Luz; Referee: António Espanhol |

| 6 November 1977 7 | Portimonense | 0–3 | Benfica | Portimão |
| 18:00 | | Report | Chalana 8'; Vítor Baptista 11'; Pietra 73' (pen.) | Stadium: Estádio Municipal de Portimão; Referee: Rosa Santos |

| 20 November 1977 8 | Benfica | 6–0 | Marítimo | Lisbon |
| 18:00 | Vítor Baptista 40', 85', 89'; Chalana 58'; Shéu 61'; Cavungi 64' | Report | | Stadium: Estádio da Luz; Referee: Inácio de Almeida |

| 27 November 1977 9 | Benfica | 3–1 | Académica de Coimbra | Lisbon |
| 19:00 | Vítor Baptista 16'; Nené 20', 44' | Report | Freitas 70' | Stadium: Estádio da Luz; Referee: Albino Rodrigues |

| 4 December 1977 10 | Braga | 0–0 | Benfica | Braga |
| 19:00 | | Report | | Stadium: Estádio 1º de Maio; Referee: Américo Borges |

| 11 December 1977 11 | Benfica | 3–2 | Vitória de Setúbal | Lisbon |
| 19:00 | Nené 41', 58'; Chalana 84' (pen.) | Report | Rachão 2'; Jacinto João 89' | Stadium: Estádio da Luz; Referee: Manuel Amiguinho |

| 18 December 1977 12 | Estoril Praia | 0–3 | Benfica | Estoril |
| 19:00 | | Report | Shéu 10'; Cavungi 23'; Nené 77' | Stadium: Estádio António Coimbra da Mota; Referee: Américo Borges |

| 15 January 1978 13 | Benfica | 0–0 | Porto | Lisbon |
| 20:00 | | Report | | Stadium: Estádio da Luz; Referee: Alder Dante |

| 22 January 1978 14 | Feirense | 0–1 | Benfica | Santa Maria da Feira |
| 18:30 | | Report | Nené 13' | Stadium: Estádio Marcolino de Castro; Referee: António Espanhol |

| 28 January 1978 15 | Benfica | 3–0 | Riopele | Lisbon |
| 18:00 | Nené 11'; Toni 79'; Vítor Baptista 89' | Report | | Stadium: Estádio da Luz; Referee: Marques Pires |

| 12 February 1978 16 | Benfica | 1–0 | Sporting | Lisbon |
| 19:00 | Vítor Baptista 54' | Report | | Stadium: Estádio da Luz; Referee: Rosa Santos |

| 19 February 1978 17 | Belenenses | 0–0 | Benfica | Lisbon |
| 18:00 | | Report | | Stadium: Estádio do Restelo; Referee: Mário Luís |

| 26 February 1978 18 | Benfica | 2–0 | Vitória de Guimarães | Lisbon |
| 19:00 | Toni 44'; Nené 64' | Report | | Stadium: Estádio da Luz; Referee: César Correia |

| 12 March 1978 19 | Varzim | 0–0 | Benfica | Póvoa de Varzim |
| 18:00 | | Report | | Stadium: Estádio do Varzim SC; Referee: Raúl Nazaré |

| 19 March 1978 20 | Benfica | 2–0 | Boavista | Lisbon |
| 18:00 | Humberto Coelho 84'; Celso 89' | Report | | Stadium: Estádio da Luz; Referee: Albino Rodrigues |

| 2 April 1978 21 | Espinho | 1–5 | Benfica | Espinho |
| 18:30 | Canavarro 52' | Report | Nené 39', 86'; Rui Lopes 42'; Pietra 44'; Humberto Coelho 66' | Stadium: Estádio Comendador Manuel Violas; Referee: António Garrido |

| 8 April 1978 22 | Benfica | 1–1 | Portimonense | Lisbon |
| 18:00 | Chalana 60' | Report | Sapinho 37' | Stadium: Estádio da Luz; Referee: Manuel Vicente |

| 16 April 1978 23 | Marítimo | 0–1 | Benfica | Funchal |
| 19:00 | | Report | Shéu 77' | Stadium: Estádio dos Barreiros; Referee: Rosa Santos |

| 30 April 1978 24 | Académica de Coimbra | 0–3 | Benfica | Coimbra |
| 18:00 | | Report | José Luís 60', 68'; Nené 74' | Stadium: Estádio Municipal de Coimbra; Referee: César Correia |

| 7 May 1978 25 | Benfica | 0–0 | Braga | Lisbon |
| 18:00 | | Report | | Stadium: Estádio da Luz; Referee: José Luís Tavares |

| 14 May 1978 26 | Vitória de Setúbal | 0–1 | Benfica | Setúbal |
| 18:00 | | Report | Eurico 43' | Stadium: Estádio do Bonfim; Referee: Santos Luís |

| 21 May 1978 27 | Benfica | 2–1 | Estoril Praia | Lisbon |
| 19:30 | Chalana 10'; Shéu 52' | Report | Cepeda 20' | Stadium: Estádio da Luz; Referee: Rosa Santos |

| 28 May 1978 28 | Porto | 1–1 | Benfica | Porto |
| 20:00 | Ademir 83' | Report | Simões 3' (o.g.) | Stadium: Estádio das Antas; Referee: Manuel Vicente |

| 4 June 1978 29 | Benfica | 2–0 | Feirense | Lisbon |
| 18:00 | Shéu 38'; Jorge Silva 87' | Report | | Stadium: Estádio da Luz; Referee: Raúl Nazaré |

| 11 June 1978 30 | Riopele | 1–4 | Benfica | Braga |
| 18:00 | António Luís 33' | Report | Nené 9'; Rui Lopes 23', 79'; José Luís 76' | Stadium: Estádio 1º de Maio; Referee: Castro e Sousa |

=== Taça de Portugal ===
| 13 November 1977 Second Rd | Benfica | 2–0 | Chaves | Lisbon |
| 16:00 | Pereirinha 47'; Pietra 54' (pen.) | Report | | Stadium: Estádio da Luz; Referee: Evaristo Faustino |

| 1 December 1977 Third Rd | CUF | 0–8 | Benfica | Barreiro |
| 16:00 | | Report | Vítor Baptista 31'; Toni 44'; Nené 57', 84'; Bastos Lopes 63'; Pietra 65', 70' (pen.); Mário Wilson 87' | Stadium: Complexo Desportivo Alfredo da Silva; Referee: Alder Dante |

| 8 January 1978 Fourth Rd | Benfica | 5–0 | Belenenses | Lisbon |
| 16:00 | Nené 10'; Shéu 25'; Vítor Baptista 44'; Cavungi 70', 89' | Report | | Stadium: Estádio da Luz; Referee: José Luís Tavares |

| 5 February 1978 Fifth Rd | Benfica | 7–2 | SC Régua | Lisbon |
| 16:00 | Nené 8', 28', 39', 46'; Vítor Baptista 18', 33'; Humberto Coelho 48' | Report | Albino 31', 69' | Stadium: Estádio da Luz; Referee: Francisco Lobo |

| 5 March 1978 Quarter-final | Sporting | 3–1 | Benfica | Lisbon |
| 16:00 | Manuel Fernandes 13', 35'; Keita 55' | Report | Humberto Coelho 81' | Stadium: Estádio de Alvalade; Referee: Porém Luís |

=== European Cup ===
==== First round ====
| 14 September 1977 First leg | Benfica (Portugal) | 0–0 | (Soviet Union) Torpedo Moscow | Lisbon |
| 21:30 | | Report | | Stadium: Estádio da Luz; Attendance: 50,000; Referee: Wurtz |

| 29 September 1977 Second Leg | Torpedo Moscow (Soviet Union) | 0–0 (a.e.t.) (1–4 p) | (Portugal) Benfica | Moscow |
| 19:30 | | Report | | Stadium: Central Dynamo Stadium; Attendance: 30,000; Referee: Erik Fredriksson |
| | Penalties |
| | Yurin (penalty missed); Nikonov (penalty missed); Belenkov (penalty scored) | | Pietra (penalty scored); José Luís (penalty scored); Chalana (penalty scored); Bento (penalty scored) |

==== Second round ====
| 19 October 1977 First leg | Benfica (Portugal) | 1–0 | (Denmark) Boldklubben 1903 | Lisbon |
| 21:30 | Pietra 47' (pen.) | Report | | Stadium: Estádio da Luz; Attendance: 50,000; Referee: John Carpenter |

| 2 November 1977 Second Leg | Boldklubben 1903 (Denmark) | 0–1 (0–2 agg.) | (Portugal) Benfica | Copenhagen |
| 19:00 | | Report | Pietra 49' | Stadium: Idrætsparken; Attendance: 30,000; Referee: Michal Jursa |

==== Quarter-finals ====
| 1 March 1978 First leg | Benfica (Portugal) | 1–2 | (England) Liverpool | Lisbon |
| 21:30 | Nené 13' | Report | Case 36'; Hughes 71' | Stadium: Estádio da Luz; Attendance: 60,000; Referee: Frans Derks |

| 15 March 1978 Second Leg | Liverpool (England) | 4–1 (6–2 agg.) | (Portugal) Benfica | Liverpool |
| 19:30 | Callaghan 6'; Dalglish 17'; McDermott 78'; Neal 88' | Report | Nené 25' | Stadium: Anfield Road; Attendance: 40,000; Referee: Georges Konrath |

=== Friendlies ===
| 11 August 1977 | Benfica | 4–3 | Portimonense | Lisbon |
| | Nené; Chalana; Cavungi | | Valter; Sardinheira | Stadium: Estádio Nacional |

| 23 August 1977 Trofeo de Sevilla | Sevilla | 3–0 | Benfica | Seville |
| | Humberto Coelho (o.g.); Jaén (pen.); Biri Biri | | | Stadium: Estadio Benito Villamarín; Attendance: 60,000 |

| 25 August 1977 Trofeo de Sevilla | Vasas | 2–1 | Benfica | Seville |
| | Béla Várady; Pietra (o.g.) | | Vítor Baptista | Stadium: Estadio Benito Villamarín |

| 21 December 1977 Taça de Honra | Belenenses | 0–1 | Benfica | Lisbon |
| | | | Celso Pita 87' | Stadium: Estádio do Restelo; Referee: Alfredo Pereira |

| 28 December 1977 Taça de Honra | Benfica | 0–0 (a.e.t.) (7–6 p) | Sporting | Lisbon |
| | Celso Pita (red card) | | Augusto Inácio (red card) 17' | Stadium: Estádio do Restelo; Attendance: 30,000; Referee: Francisco Costa |
| | Penalties |
| | Vítor Baptista (penalty scored); Mário Wilson (penalty scored); Humberto Coelho (penalty scored); Manuel Bento (penalty scored); Cavungi (penalty scored); Toni (penalty scored); Eurico (penalty scored); Pereirinha (penalty missed) | | (penalty scored) Murça; (penalty scored) Manuel Fernandes; (penalty scored) Rui Jordão; (penalty scored) Manaca; (penalty scored) Francisco Barão; (penalty scored) Ailton Ballesteros; (penalty missed) Artur; (penalty missed) Rui Cerdeira |

| 30 January 1978 | Saudi Arabia B | 3–2 | Benfica | Riyadh |
| | | | Diamantino; Celso Pita |

| 31 January 1978 | Saudi Arabia | 1–0 | Benfica | Riyadh |

| 1 February 1978 | Al-Nassr | 0–2 | Benfica | Riyadh |
| | | | Rui Lopes |

| 23 April 1978 | Académico de Viseu | 0–7 | Benfica | Viseu |
| | | | Celso Pita; Shéu; Toni; José Luís; Chalana | Stadium: Estádio do Fontelo |

| 31 May 1978 | Beira-Mar | 0–0 | Benfica | Aveiro |
| | | | | Stadium: Estádio Mário Duarte |

| 14 June 1978 | Chaves | 1–0 | Benfica | Chaves |
| | António Bastos Lopes 22' (o.g.) | | | Stadium: Estádio Municipal de Chaves |

| 23 June 1978 | Black Gold | 1–3 | Benfica | Edmonton |
| | | | Nené; Chalana |

| 25 June 1978 | Toronto Panhellenic | 0–7 | Benfica | Toronto |
| | | | Chalana; Rui Lopes; Humberto; Jorge Silva; Nené; Celso Pito | Stadium: Estádio Mário Duarte |

| 28 June 1978 | Montreal Castors | 0–1 | Benfica | Montreal |
| | | | Humberto 47' | Stadium: Complexe sportif Claude-Robillard |

== Player statistics ==
The squad for the season consisted of the players listed in the tables below, as well as staff member John Mortimore (manager), Rui Silva (assistant manager).

Note 1: Note: Flags indicate national team as defined under FIFA eligibility rules. Players may hold more than one non-FIFA nationality.

Note 2: Players with squad numbers marked ‡ joined the club during the 1977-78 season via transfer, with more details in the following section.

| No. | Pos | Nat | Player | Total | | Primeira Divisão | | Taça de Portugal | | European Cup | |
| No. | Pos | Nat | Player | Apps | Goals | Apps | Goals | Apps | Goals | Apps | Goals |
|---|---|---|---|---|---|---|---|---|---|---|---|
| 1 | GK | (Portugal) POR | Manuel Bento | 38 | 0 | 27 | 0 | 5 | 0 | 6 | 0 |
| 1^{‡} | GK | (Portugal) POR | António Fidalgo | 7 | 0 | 5 | 0 | 2 | 0 | 0 | 0 |
| 2 | DF | (Portugal) POR | Minervino Pietra | 32 | 9 | 23 | 4 | 3 | 3 | 6 | 2 |
| 2 | DF | (Portugal) POR | Alberto Fonseca | 40 | 0 | 29 | 0 | 5 | 0 | 6 | 0 |
| 3^{‡} | DF | (Portugal) POR | Humberto Coelho | 39 | 4 | 29 | 2 | 4 | 2 | 6 | 0 |
| 4 | DF | (Portugal) POR | Eurico Gomes | 41 | 1 | 30 | 1 | 5 | 0 | 6 | 0 |
| 4 | DF | (Portugal) POR | Joaquim Pereirinha | 20 | 1 | 14 | 0 | 4 | 1 | 2 | 0 |
| 5 | DF | (Portugal) POR | António Bastos Lopes | 40 | 2 | 29 | 1 | 5 | 1 | 6 | 0 |
| 5^{‡} | MF | (Portugal) POR | Mário Wilson | 12 | 1 | 7 | 0 | 2 | 1 | 3 | 0 |
| 5 | MF | (Portugal) POR | José Luís | 21 | 4 | 15 | 4 | 1 | 0 | 5 | 0 |
| 6 | MF | (Portugal) POR | Toni | 41 | 3 | 30 | 2 | 5 | 1 | 6 | 0 |
| 7 | FW | (Portugal) POR | Nené | 36 | 21 | 27 | 12 | 4 | 7 | 5 | 2 |
| 8 | MF | (Portugal) POR | Vítor Martins | 5 | 0 | 2 | 0 | 1 | 0 | 2 | 0 |
| 9 | FW | (Portugal) POR | Vítor Baptista | 21 | 12 | 15 | 8 | 4 | 4 | 2 | 0 |
| 9^{‡} | FW | (Portugal) POR | Rui Lopes | 9 | 3 | 8 | 3 | 0 | 0 | 1 | 0 |
| 9 | FW | (Portugal) POR | Jorge Silva | 2 | 1 | 1 | 1 | 1 | 0 | 0 | 0 |
| 9^{‡} | FW | (Portugal) POR | Celso Pita | 23 | 2 | 18 | 2 | 1 | 0 | 4 | 0 |
| 10 | MF | (Portugal) POR | Fernando Chalana | 35 | 8 | 28 | 8 | 3 | 0 | 4 | 0 |
| 11 | MF | (Portugal) POR | Shéu | 39 | 6 | 28 | 5 | 5 | 1 | 6 | 0 |
| 11 | FW | (Portugal) POR | Cavungi | 20 | 4 | 13 | 2 | 5 | 2 | 2 | 0 |

== Transfers ==
=== In ===
| Entry date | Position | Player | From club | Fee | Ref |
|---|---|---|---|---|---|
| 14 April 1977 | DF | Humberto Coelho | Paris Saint-Germain | Undisclosed | |
| 30 June 1977 | MF | Diamantino Miranda | Vitória de Setúbal | Undisclosed | |
| 30 June 1977 | MF | Mário Wilson | Atlético | Undisclosed | |
| 1 July 1977 | FW | Rui Lopes | Vitória de Guimarães | Free | |
| 16 July 1977 | FW | Celso Pita | Boavista | Undisclosed | |
| 28 July 1977 | GK | António Fidalgo | Braga | Loan return | |
| 4 August 1977 | MF | Toni | Las Vegas Quicksilvers | Loan return | |

=== Out ===
| Exit date | Position | Player | To club | Fee | Ref |
|---|---|---|---|---|---|
| 2 June 1977 | MF | Mário Moinhos | Boavista | Free | |
| 1 July 1977 | GK | Álvaro Reis | Sesimbra | Free | |
| 13 July 1977 | MF | Romeu Silva | Vitória de Guimarães | Free | |
| 15 July 1977 | DF | Carlos Alhinho | Molenbeek | Loan end | |
| 23 July 1977 | DF | Artur Correia | Sporting CP | Free | |
| 5 August 1977 | FW | Nelinho | Braga | Free | |
| 10 August 1977 | FW | José Domingos | Feirense | Free | |
| 12 August 1977 | DF | Messias Timula | Riopele | Free | |

=== Out by loan ===
| Exit date | Position | Player | To club | Return date | Ref |
|---|---|---|---|---|---|
| 1 July 1977 | FW | Orlando Fonseca | Riopele | 30 June 1978 | |

== See also ==
- List of unbeaten football club seasons
