= 1975–76 S.L. Benfica season =

Benfica
1975–76 season
- President: Borges Coutinho
- Head coach: Mário Wilson
- Stadium: Estádio da Luz
- Primeira Divisão: 1st
- Taça de Portugal: Fifth round
- European Cup: Quarter-finals
- Top goalscorer: League: Jordão (30); All: Nené (34)
Home colours

The 1975–76 season was Sport Lisboa e Benfica's 72nd season in existence and the club's 42nd consecutive season in the top flight of Portuguese football, covering the period from 1 July 1975 to 30 June 1976. Benfica competed domestically in the Primeira Divisão and the Taça de Portugal, and participated in the European Cup after winning the previous league.

In the midst of the PREC, Benfica changes managers, with Milorad Pavić leaving for Mário Wilson. In the transfer window, Benfica lost several historic players, notably Eusébio, António Simões, Adolfo Calisto, Artur Jorge and Jaime Graça. With almost no new signings, Benfica campaign started with a home draw against Boavista, which would become his main rival all season. They reached an isolated first place by early October, only to lose after a defeat against Belenenses. Still, they remained in first, ex aequo with other teams, until they drew in Braga and were overtaken by Boavista. Meanwhile, in Europe, the opening rounds of the European Cup saw Benfica defeat Fenerbahçe by 7–1 on aggregate, and Újpesti Dózsa by 6–5 after a tight match in Hungary. In the Primeira Divisão, Benfica lapped the first half of the season with a point less than Boavista. After defeating them on match-day 16, Benfica regained the lead, but only briefly, as they lost it two weeks later, when Leixões beat them. Both teams remained at the front, until Boavista conceded two consecutive losses in March and gave Benfica a four-point lead. Despite that, March also cost Benfica competitions, with the European Cup falling after a 5–1 loss Bayern Munich and the Portuguese Cup to a one-nil loss to Sporting. Benfica won the following matches in April and celebrated their back-to-back league title on 10 May, the club's 22nd.

== Season summary ==
In the aftermath of the Carnation Revolution, the country was experiencing the Processo Revolucionário Em Curso, a troubled time which followed the revolution. The club was experiencing financial problems, with a director saying in a members meet in April 1975, that Benfica could end in two or three months. Milorad Pavić brought the title back to Benfica, but did not wish to continue and departed the club, being replaced by Mário Wilson on 30 May 1975. In the transfer window, Benfica lost two historic club players, Eusébio and António Simões, plus others important players of the past such as Adolfo Calisto, Artur Jorge and Jaime Graça. They also had to sell Humberto Coelho due to the economic situation. The club made almost no new signings, with Romeu Silva and Eduardo Luís being the more noteworthy. Having appointed Fernando Cabrita as his assistant manager, the pre-season began on 22 July. Initially, the training sessions would be in Ferreira do Zêzere, but financial constraints, caused it to be moved to Carcavelos. For preparation, Benfica played in Germany with Borussia Mönchengladbach, competed in the II Troféu Villa de Bilbao with Queen Park Rangers, Real Sociedad and Athletic Bilbao. Afterwards, they embarked on a tour to Australia and Indonesia, playing seven matches in 15 days, before finishing the pre-season on 5 September with Paris Saint-Germain.

Benfica opened their league campaign with a reception to Boavista, where they drew 0–0. They reacted well and won the next four matches, reaching top of the table with 9 points, one more than Boavista and Braga. Meanwhile, in the opening round of the European Cup, Benfica thrashed Fenerbahçe by winning 7–0 at home, with a one-nil loss in Turkey. Domestically, on match-day 6, Benfica lost 4–2 away with Belenenses and was caught at the lead by four other teams. They followed that loss with three consecutive wins, before a dropping points in Estádio 1º de Maio with Braga. That cost them the first place, as Boavista overtook them, with a point more. In the European Cup, Benfica faced the Hungarian team Újpesti Dózsa, defeating them by 5–2 at home. In the return leg, the Hungarians dominated and reached 3–0 in the second half; even had the opportunity to score the fourth before Nené scored on the 73rd minute to make it 6–5 on aggregate. In December, Benfica won the first three matches, before dropping points with Sporting on the 28. By the New Year, Boavista led the league by a point. In the first match in 1976, Benfica visited Estádio das Antas and beat Porto by 3–2. As Boavista had won in Estádio de Alvalade, they lapped the first half of the season, still in second place. On the opening match of the second half, Benfica visited Estádio do Bessa to play the leaders Boavista, winning 4–1 and assuming the first place with a one-point lead. They would stay at the front only two weeks, because on 26 January, in a match played in Bessa, Benfica lost one-nil with Leixões. They were back in second with 29 points; a point less than Boavista who had won at home.

A week later, it was Boavista turn to lose points and Benfica catch them again in the lead, all level with 31 points. On 16 February, Benfica lost points again with Belenenses, but took advantage of the Boavista's draw with Vitória de Guimarães, to keep the lead, albeit still shared with them. In March, Benfica's opening game was the home leg of the quarter-final of the European Cup with Bayern Munich, with a result being a 0–0 draw. Wilson blamed German goalkeeper Maier for his team's lack of goals. In the Primeira Divisão, on 8 March, Benfica defeated Farense at home by 3–0, while Boavista lost in Antas with Porto. That allowed Benfica to isolate himself in the lead with 38 points, two more than Boavista. A week later, another win for Benfica, away against Estoril Praia, with Boavista losing again, now at home with União de Tomar. They were now with a four-point lead over Boavista with six matches to go. On 17 March, Benfica visited the Olympiastadion to play Bayern Munich. They were thrashed, losing 5–1. According to Wilson, losing a player (Vítor Martins) to injury altered the team strategy, but he also pointed to several mistakes by referee Hilmi Ok that favoured Bayern. Nonetheless, a few days later, he admitted that Benfica's team was enough to play domestically, but insufficient in the European stage. Benfica concluded March with a Portuguese Cup game against Sporting, where they lost one-nil with a goal in overtime. With the league campaign approaching the end, Benfica continued their winning path in April, and secured their back-to-back league title on 10 May with a win in Bonfim against Vitória de Setúbal. It was the club's 22nd in 42 editions. With the title won, in the final two match-days, Benfica won in Alvalade against Sporting and lost at home with Porto. Rui Jordão was the Bola de Prata with 30 goals, one more than Nené, the second leading scorer. Despite winning the title, President Borges Coutinho expressed his desire to have a British manager at the helm, which signalled the departure of Mário Wilson.

== Competitions ==
Win Draw Loss Postponed

=== Overall record ===
Competition	First match	Last match	Record								
Competition	First match	Last match	G	W	D	L	GF	GA	GD	Win %	Source
Primeira Divisão	10 September 1975	30 May 1976	30	23	4	3	94	20	+74	76.67	
Taça de Portugal	28 March 1976	28 March 1976	1	0	0	1	0	1	−1	0.00	
European Cup	17 September 1975	17 March 1976	6	2	1	3	14	11	+3	33.33	
Total			37	25	5	7	108	32	+76	67.57	

=== Primeira Divisão ===
==== League table ====
Pos	Team	Pld	W	D	L	GF	GA	GD	Pts	Qualification or relegation
1	Benfica (C)	30	23	4	3	94	20	+74	50	Qualification to European Cup first round
2	Boavista	30	21	6	3	65	23	+42	48	Qualification to Cup Winners' Cup first round (Note: Boavista qualified for the Cup Winners' Cup as winners of the 1976 Taça de Portugal Final.)
3	Belenenses	30	16	8	6	45	28	+17	40	Qualification to UEFA Cup first round
4	Porto	30	16	7	7	73	33	+40	39	Qualification to UEFA Cup first round
5	Sporting CP	30	16	6	8	54	31	+23	38	Qualification to UEFA Cup first round

Source: RSSSF and footballzz.co.uk
(C) Champions

==== Results by round ====
Round	1	2	3	4	5	6	7	8	9	10	11	12	13	14	15	16	17	18	19	20	21	22	23	24	25	26	27	28	29	30
Ground	H	A	H	A	H	A	H	A	H	A	H	H	A	H	A	A	H	A	H	A	H	A	H	A	H	A	H	A	A	H
Result	D	W	W	W	W	L	W	W	W	D	W	W	W	D	W	W	W	L	W	W	D	W	W	W	W	W	W	W	W	L
Position	8	6	2	1	1	1	1	1	1	2	1	1	1	2	2	1	1	2	1	1	1	1	1	1	1	1	1	1	1	1

Source: ForaDeJogo
A = Away; H = Home; W = Win; D = Draw; L = Loss

==== Matches ====
10 September 1975 1	Benfica	0–0	Boavista	Lisbon
18:00		Report		Stadium: Estádio da Luz; Referee: César Correia

14 September 1975 2	União de Tomar	0–2	Benfica	Tomar
16:00		Report	Nené 16', 44'	Stadium: Estádio Municipal de Tomar; Referee: José Luís Tavares

21 September 1975 3	Benfica	9–1	Leixões	Lisbon
18:00	Nené 3', 13', 36', 50', 84'; Moinhos 31', 43'; Shéu 60'	Report	Neca 49' (pen.)	Stadium: Estádio da Luz; Referee: Ismael Baltasar

28 September 1975 4	Académica de Coimbra	2–4	Benfica	Coimbra
18:00	Vala 27', 35'	Report	Jordão 14'; Moinhos 17'; Shéu 45'; Toni 85'	Stadium: Estádio Municipal de Coimbra; Referee: Inácio de Almeida

5 October 1975 5	Benfica	5–0	Beira-Mar	Lisbon
18:00	Jordão 41', 63', 83'; Nené 56', 77'	Report		Stadium: Estádio da Luz; Referee: Marques dos Santos

12 October 1975 6	Belenenses	4–2	Benfica	Lisbon
18:00	Pietra 15'; Vasques 44', 56'; Artur Jorge 89'	Report	Jordão 34'; Nené 50'	Stadium: Estádio do Restelo; Referee: António Garrido

18 October 1975 7	Benfica	3–0	Atlético	Lisbon
17:00	Shéu 3', 33'; Vítor Baptista 35'	Report		Stadium: Estádio da Luz; Referee: Américo Barradas

26 October 1975 8	Farense	1–4	Benfica	Faro
18:00	Manuel José 77' (pen.)	Report	Nené 56', 61', 81'; Jordão 75'	Stadium: Estádio de São Luís; Referee: Francisco Lobo

1 November 1975 9	Benfica	7–1	Estoril Praia	Lisbon
18:00	Bastos Lopes 15'; Shéu 18'; Nené 20'; Moinhos 23'; Vítor Martins 59'; Vítor Baptista 74'; Jordão 80'	Report	José Torres 88'	Stadium: Estádio da Luz; Referee: Maximiano Afonso

23 November 1975 10	Braga	0–0	Benfica	Braga
18:00		Report		Stadium: Estádio 1º de Maio; Referee: Fernando Paraty

1 December 1975 11	Benfica	2–0	Vitória de Setúbal	Lisbon
19:00	Jordão 33', 80'	Report		Stadium: Estádio da Luz; Referee: Alder Dante

10 December 1975 12	Benfica	2–0	Vitória de Guimarães	Lisbon
19:00	Nené 21'; Jordão 80'	Report		Stadium: Estádio da Luz; Referee: Mário Luís

14 December 1975 13	CUF	0–1	Benfica	Barreiro
18:00		Report	18' Vítor Baptista	Stadium: Complexo Desportivo Alfredo da Silva; Referee: Jaime Loureiro

28 December 1975 14	Benfica	0–0	Sporting	Lisbon
18:00		Report		Stadium: Estádio da Luz; Referee: César Correia

4 January 1976 15	Porto	2–3	Benfica	Porto
18:00	Fernando Gomes 2'; Simões 40'	Report	Vítor Martins 7'; Jordão 28', 35' (pen.)	Stadium: Estádio das Antas; Referee: António Garrido

10 January 1976 16	Boavista	1–4	Benfica	Porto
18:00	Barbosa 25'	Report	Jordão 13'; Moinhos 26', 49'; Shéu 78'	Stadium: Estádio do Bessa; Referee: Porém Luís

17 January 1976 17	Benfica	6–1	União de Tomar	Lisbon
18:00	Messias 21'; Nené 37', 90'; Jordão 48', 50', 79'	Report	Florival 80'	Stadium: Estádio da Luz; Referee: Ismael Baltasar

25 January 1976 18	Leixões	1–0	Benfica	Porto
18:00	Frasco 65'	Report		Stadium: Estádio do Bessa; Referee: José Luís Tavares

1 February 1976 19	Benfica	4–0	Académica de Coimbra	Lisbon
18:00	Nené 47'; Jordão 55', 57'; Shéu 88'	Report		Stadium: Estádio da Luz; Referee: Manuel Poeira

9 February 1976 20	Beira-Mar	0–2	Benfica	Aveiro
18:00		Report	32', 71' Jordão	Stadium: Estádio Mário Duarte; Referee: Moreira Tavares

16 February 1976 21	Benfica	1–1	Belenenses	Lisbon
18:00	Vítor Martins 35'	Report	Alfredo 16'	Stadium: Estádio da Luz; Referee: Américo Barradas

21 February 1976 22	Atlético	0–2	Benfica	Lisbon
18:30		Report	Toni 20'; Nené 69'	Stadium: Estádio da Tapadinha; Referee: Inácio de Almeida

7 March 1976 23	Benfica	3–0	Farense	Lisbon
19:00	Jordão 7', 43'; Nené 38'	Report		Stadium: Estádio da Luz; Referee: Amândio Silva

13 March 1976 24	Estoril Praia	0–4	Benfica	Estoril
18:00		Report	Jordão 28', 49', 65'; Vítor Baptista 30'	Stadium: Estádio António Coimbra da Mota; Referee: António Ferreira

21 March 1976 25	Benfica	7–1	Braga	Lisbon
18:00	Nené 11', 36', 65'; Jordão 20', 32'; Vítor Baptista 23', 43'	Report	Chico Gordo 34'	Stadium: Estádio da Luz; Referee: César Ferreira

5 April 1976 26	Vitória de Guimarães	0–3	Benfica	Guimarães
18:00		Report	Nené 9'; Vítor Baptista 34'; Jordão 43'	Stadium: Estádio D. Afonso Henriques; Referee: António Espanhol

11 April 1976 27	Benfica	5–1	CUF	Lisbon
18:00	Nené 4', 65'; Frederico 27' (o.g.); Jordão 41'; Vieira 80' (o.g.)	Report	Vieira 86'	Stadium: Estádio da Luz; Referee: Albino Rodrigues

9 May 1976 28	Vitória de Setúbal	0–4	Benfica	Setúbal
18:00		Report	Vítor Baptista 15'; Nené 17'; Toni 50'; Jordão 89'	Stadium: Estádio do Bonfim; Referee: António Garrido

23 May 1976 29	Sporting	0–3	Benfica	Lisbon
18:00		Report	Nené 82', 88'; Jordão 85'	Stadium: Estádio de Alvalade; Referee: Nemésio de Castro

30 May 1976 30	Benfica	2–3	Porto	Lisbon
20:00	Toni 16'; Vítor Baptista 33'	Report	Ademir 51'; Júlio Augusto 68', 88'	Stadium: Estádio da Luz; Referee: César Correia

=== Taça de Portugal ===
28 March 1976 Fifth Rd	Sporting	1–0 (a.e.t.)	Benfica	Lisbon
16:00	Libânio 115'	Report		Stadium: Estádio de Alvalade; Referee: Porém Luís

=== European Cup ===
==== First round ====
17 September 1975 First leg	Benfica (Portugal)	7–0	(Turkey) Fenerbahçe	Lisbon
21:45	Shéu 22'; Nené 33', 43', 72'; Jordão 60', 75', 84'	Report		Stadium: Estádio da Luz; Attendance: 60,000; Referee: Robert Héliès

1 October 1975 Second Leg	Fenerbahçe (Turkey)	1–0 (1–7 agg.)	(Portugal) Benfica	İzmir
20:30	Verel 75'	Report		Stadium: İzmir Alsancak Stadium; Attendance: 15,000; Referee: Sandor Petri

==== Second round ====
22 October 1975 First leg	Benfica (Portugal)	5–2	(Hungary) Újpesti Dózsa	Lisbon
21:45	Shéu 16', 37'; Vítor Baptista 31', 89'; Toni 75'	Report	Dunai 20'; Fazekas 61'	Stadium: Estádio da Luz; Attendance: 60,000; Referee: Clive Thomas

5 November 1975 Second Leg	Újpesti Dózsa (Hungary)	3–1 (5–6 agg.)	(Portugal) Benfica	Budapest
17:00	Bene 3', 54'; Nagy 65'	Report	Nené 73'	Stadium: Ferenc Szusza Stadium; Attendance: 15,000; Referee: Riccardo Lattanzi

==== Quarter-final ====
3 March 1976 First leg	Benfica (Portugal)	0–0	(West Germany) Bayern Munich	Lisbon
21:30		Report		Stadium: Estádio da Luz; Attendance: 60,000; Referee: John Gordon

17 March 1976 Second Leg	Bayern Munich (West Germany)	5–1 (5–1 agg.)	(Portugal) Benfica	Munich
20:00	Dürnberger 50', 55'; Rummenigge 68'; Müller 73', 83'	Report	Nené 70'	Stadium: Olympiastadion; Attendance: 50,000; Referee: Hilmi Ok

=== Friendlies ===
5 August 1975	Borussia Mönchengladbach	1–1	Benfica	Mönchengladbach
	Simonsen 25'		Mário Moinhos 80'	Stadium: Bökelbergstadion; Attendance: 25,000; Referee: Walter Escherg

8 August 1975 Trofeo de Bilbao	Queen Park Rangers	4–2	Benfica	Bilbao
	Bowles 12', 13'; Don Givens 15'; Webb 18'		Nené 60'; Vítor Baptista 75'	Stadium: San Mamés Stadium

9 August 1975 Trofeo de Bilbao	Benfica	2–0	Real Sociedad	Bilbao
	Vítor Baptista 30', 44'			Stadium: San Mamés Stadium; Referee: Augusto Lamo Castillo

17 August 1975	Benfica	2–0	Victoria XI	Melbourne
	Nené; Vítor Baptista			Stadium: Middle Park

20 August 1975	Australia	2–2	Benfica	Sydney
	Buljevic		Nené; Vítor Baptista	Stadium: Sydney Sports Ground; Attendance: 12,164; Referee: Tony Boskovic

22 August 1975	Wollongong XI	0–4	Benfica	Wollongong
			Diamantino 3'; Langford (o.g.); Shéu; Nené	Stadium: Wollongong Showground

24 August 1975	South Australia XI	0–1	Benfica	Adelaide
			Nelinho 85'	Stadium: Adelaide City Park

26 August 1975 Indonesia TM	Soviet Union	1–1	Benfica	Jakarta
			Mário Moinhos	Stadium: Gelora Bung Karno Stadium

27 August 1975 Indonesia TM	Indonesia	0–0	Benfica	Jakarta
				Stadium: Gelora Bung Karno Stadium

29 August 1975 Indonesia TM	Benfica	2–1	Rosario Central	Jakarta
				Stadium: Gelora Bung Karno Stadium

5 September 1975	Paris Saint-Germain	2–0	Benfica	Paris
	M'Pelé 29'; Dahleb 33'			Stadium: Parc des Princes; Attendance: 12,000

9 November 1975 Taça de Honra	Belenenses	1–0	Benfica	Lisbon
	João Leitão 59'			Stadium: Estádio do Restelo

16 November 1975 Taça de Honra	Estoril Praia	1–1	Benfica	Estoril
	Quim 31'		Nelinho 76'	Stadium: Estádio António Coimbra da Mota

30 November 1975 Taça de Honra	Sporting	2–4	Benfica	Lisbon
	Garcês 4'; Baltasar 8'			Stadium: Estádio do Restelo

December 1975 Taça de Honra	Benfica	8–0	Atlético	Lisbon
				Stadium: Estádio do Restelo

21 April 1976	Benfica	3–4	Sporting	Ponta Delgada
	Messias Timula 24'; Nené 45'; Rui Jordão		Manuel Fernandes 13'; Chico 21'; Baltasar 29'; Da Costa	Referee: António Garrido

== Player statistics ==
The squad for the season consisted of the players listed in the tables below, as well as staff member Mário Wilson (manager), Fernando Cabrita (assistant manager).

Note 1: Note: Flags indicate national team as defined under FIFA eligibility rules. Players may hold more than one non-FIFA nationality.

Note 2: Players with squad numbers marked ‡ joined the club during the 1975-76 season via transfer, with more details in the following section.

No.	Pos	Nat	Player	Total		Primeira Divisão		Taça de Portugal		European Cup	
No.	Pos	Nat	Player	Apps	Goals	Apps	Goals	Apps	Goals	Apps	Goals
1	GK	(Portugal) POR	Manuel Bento	18	0	15	0	0	0	3	0
1	GK	(Portugal) POR	José Henrique	21	0	17	0	1	0	3	0
2	DF	(Portugal) POR	Alberto Fonseca	1	0	1	0	0	0	0	0
3	DF	(Portugal) POR	Amândio Malta da Silva	12	0	10	0	0	0	2	0
3	DF	(Portugal) POR	Artur Correia	31	0	25	0	1	0	5	0
4	DF	(Portugal) POR	Eurico Gomes	22	0	18	0	0	0	4	0
4	DF	(Portugal) POR	Messias Timula	25	1	22	1	1	0	2	0
4	DF	(Portugal) POR	António Barros	33	0	26	0	1	0	6	0
5^{‡}	DF	(Portugal) POR	Eduardo Luís	3	0	3	0	0	0	0	0
5	DF	(Portugal) POR	António Bastos Lopes	31	1	25	1	1	0	5	0
6^{‡}	MF	(Portugal) POR	Romeu Silva	2	0	2	0	0	0	0	0*
6	MF	(Portugal) POR	Toni	36	6	29	5	1	0	6	1
7	FW	(Portugal) POR	Nené	35	34	29	29	0	0	6	5
8	MF	(Portugal) POR	Nelinho	16	0	10	0	1	0	5	0
8	MF	(Portugal) POR	Vítor Martins	28	3	23	3	0	0	5	0
9	FW	(Portugal) POR	Vítor Baptista	22	11	16	9	1	0	5	2
9	FW	(Portugal) POR	Rui Jordão	34	33	28	30	1	0	5	3
9	FW	(Portugal) POR	Mário Moinhos	36	7	29	7	1	0	6	0
9^{‡}	FW	(Portugal) POR	José Domingos	1	0	0	0	1	0	0	0
10	MF	(Portugal) POR	Fernando Chalana	2	0	2	0	0	0	0	0
11	MF	(Portugal) POR	Diamantino Costa	20	0	17	0	1	0	2	0
11	MF	(Portugal) POR	Shéu	35	9	28	7	1	0	6	2
11	FW	(Portugal) POR	Cavungi	1	0	1	0	0	0	0	0

== Transfers ==
=== In ===
Entry date	Position	Player	From club	Fee	Ref
5 July 1975	MF	Romeu Silva	Vitória de Guimarães	Undisclosed	
30 June 1975	FW	José Domingos	Fabril Barreiro	Undisclosed	
23 August 1975	DF	Eduardo Luís	Marítimo	Loan return	

=== Out ===
Exit date	Position	Player	To club	Fee	Ref
26 April 1975	FW	Eusébio	Boston Minutemen	Free	
2 May 1975	MF	António Simões	Boston Minutemen	Free	
6 May 1975	DF	Humberto Coelho	Paris Saint-Germain	Undisclosed	
5 July 1975	DF	Adolfo Calisto	União Montemor	Free	
5 July 1975	FW	Rui Lopes	Vitória de Guimarães	Free	
5 July 1975	MF	Bernardino Pedroto	Vitória de Guimarães	Free	
8 July 1975	GK	João Fonseca	Varzim	Free	
11 July 1975	FW	Artur Jorge	Belenenses	Free	
30 July 1975	MF	Jaime Graça	Vitória de Setúbal	Undisclosed	

=== Out by loan ===
Exit date	Position	Player	To club	Return date	Ref
8 July 1975	MF	José Pedro	Vitória de Guimarães	30 June 1976	
5 September 1975	GK	Álvaro Reis	Esperança de Lagos	30 June 1976	
27 February 1976	FW	Vítor Móia	Rochester Lancers	1 August 1976	
27 February 1976	MF	Ibraim Silva	Rochester Lancers	1 August 1976	
