= Valter Costa =

Portuguese footballer (born 1949)

Personal information
- Full name: Valter Manuel Pereira da Costa
- Date of birth: 25 November 1949 (age 76)
- Place of birth: Barreiro, Portugal
- Position: Midfielder

Youth career
- 1965–1968: Barreirense

Senior career*
Years	Team	Apps	(Gls)
1968–1974	Barreirense	110	(9)
1974–1977	Sporting CP	50	(0)
1977–1980	Marítimo	77	(7)
1980–1982	Portimonense	45	(4)
1982–1983	Amora	29	(0)
1983–1984	Estrela Amadora		
1984–1987	Barreirense		

International career
1974	Portugal	1	(0)
- * Club domestic league appearances and goals

Valter Manuel Pereira da Costa (born 25 November 1949, in Barreiro) is a former Portuguese footballer who played as midfielder.

== Football career ==
Costa gained 1 cap for Portugal, on 3 April 1974 in Lisbon against England, in a 0-0 draw.
