= Joaquim Pereirinha =

Portuguese footballer

Personal information
- Full name: Joaquim Miguel Pedreirinho Pereirinha
- Date of birth: 26 November 1958 (age 67)
- Place of birth: Lisbon, Portugal
- Height: 1.68 m (5 ft 6 in)
- Position: Full back

Youth career
- 1974–1977: Benfica

Senior career*
Years	Team	Apps	(Gls)
1977–1981	Benfica	29	(1)
1980–1981	→ Amora (loan)	26	(1)
1981–1982	Amora	19	(0)
1982–1985	Belenenses	81	(0)
1985–1992	Farense	148	(6)
1992–1993	União Montemor	24	(4)
Total		327	(12)

International career
1974	Portugal U16	3	(0)
1976–1977	Portugal U18	13	(0)
1979	Portugal U21	5	(0)
- * Club domestic league appearances and goals

Joaquim Miguel Pedreirinho Pereirinha (born 26 November 1958) is a Portuguese former footballer who played as a full back.

== Club career ==
Born in Lisbon, Pereirinha was a youth graduate at S.L. Benfica. He was called up to the first team at the age of 18 by manager John Mortimore, going on to mainly act as backup to Minervino Pietra over the course of three Primeira Liga seasons.

After two more years in the top flight with Amora FC, and a further ten between C.F. Os Belenenses and S.C. Farense where he alternated between that tier and the Segunda Liga, Pereirinha retired professionally at nearly 34.

== Personal life ==
Pereirinha's son, Bruno, was also a footballer. He represented mainly Sporting CP and S.S. Lazio.

== Honours ==
Benfica

- Taça de Portugal: 1979–80

Belenenses

- Segunda Liga: 1983–84
