= Trofeo Ciudad de Sevilla =

Association football tournament in Seville, Spain

Trofeo Ciudad de Sevilla was a summer friendly tournament, being held in the city of Seville, organized by the Municipality of that city, in collaboration with the two football clubs more representative of Seville - Sevilla FC and Real Betis. In the beginning there used to be three participating teams, but in the last years it has been a two-team tournament. The first edition was in 1972 and was won by Sevilla FC. In 1994 he played his sixteenth and final edition.

Trofeo Ciudad de Sevilla held at Estadio Ramón Sánchez Pizjuán owned by Sevilla FC and Estadio Benito Villamarín owned by Real Betis, celebrating the end of the tournament in a different stadium each edition.

In 1992, after seven years without organizing the tournament, and on the occasion of the Universal Exposition in Seville, played a special edition, which they took part Sevilla FC, Real Betis, FC Barcelona, Atlético Madrid, Vasco da Gama and FC Porto, which won the tournament.

The trophy presented represents the most emblematic buildings and monuments of the city of Seville, La Giralda and the Torre del Oro. The trophy was different in each edition held.

== Titles ==
Note that only the winner and runner-up is shown here. Some years there were more than two participating teams.

Ed.	Year	Champion	Score	Runners-up	Other participating teams
1	1972	(Spain) Sevilla	1–0	(Hungary) Budapest Honvéd	(Spain) Real Betis, (Uruguay) Peñarol
2	1973	(Spain) Sevilla	2–1	(Soviet Union) Dynamo Moscow	(Spain) Real Betis, (Argentina) Independiente
3	1974	(Spain) Real Betis	0–0 (p)	(Portugal) S.L. Benfica	(Spain) Sevilla, (Portugal) Sporting CP
4	1975	(Spain) Real Betis	1–0	(Spain) Sevilla	(Hungary) Ferencvárosi TC, (Soviet Union) Dynamo Kyiv
5	1976	(Spain) Sevilla	1–0	(Spain) Real Betis	(Brazil) Cruzeiro, (Socialist Federal Republic of Yugoslavia) Hajduk Split
6	1977	(Spain) Real Betis	3–1	(Spain) Sevilla	(Hungary) Vasas SC, (Portugal) S.L. Benfica
7	1978	(Spain) Sevilla	1–0	(Spain) Real Betis	(Poland) Wisła Kraków, (Belgium) Standard Liège
8	1979	(Brazil) Vasco da Gama	2–2 (p)	(Spain) Real Betis	(Czechoslovakia) Slovan Bratislava, (Spain) Sevilla
9	1980	(Spain) Real Betis	2–1	(Spain) Sevilla	(Italy) A.S. Roma, (Socialist Federal Republic of Yugoslavia) Dinamo Zagreb
10	1981	(England) West Bromwich	2–0	(Spain) Sevilla	(Spain) Real Betis, (England) Southampton
11	1982	(Spain) Sevilla	2–1	(Bulgaria) CSKA Sofia	(Hungary) Ferencvárosi TC
–	1983	(Not held)			
12	1984	(Spain) Sevilla	2–1	(Argentina) Boca Juniors	(Chile) Universidad Católica
13	1985	(Uruguay) Peñarol	0–0 (p)	(Spain) Real Betis	–
–	1986–91	(Not held)			
14	1992	(Portugal) Porto	2–0	(Spain) Real Betis	(Spain) Sevilla, (Spain) Barcelona, (Spain) Atlético Madrid, (Brazil) Vasco da Gama
–	1993	(Not held)			
15	1994	(Spain) Sevilla	2–1	(Spain) Real Betis	(Colombia) América de Cali, (Bulgaria) CSKA Sofia
