= Cavungi =

Portuguese footballer

Personal information
- Full name: Manuel Francisco Salvador
- Date of birth: 1 February 1957 (age 69)
- Place of birth: Luanda, Portuguese Angola
- Position: Left winger

Youth career
- 1973–1975: Benfica

Senior career*
| Years | Team | Apps | (Gls) |
| 1975–1982 | Benfica | 29 | (4) |
| 1980–1981 | → Braga (loan) | 20 | (0) |
| 1982–1984 | Alcobaça | 29 | (3) |
| 1984–1985 | Leixões | | |
| 1985–1986 | Cova da Piedade | | |
| 1986–1987 | CD Luso | | |
| 1987–1988 | Cova da Piedade | | |
| 1988–1989 | Almancilense | | |
| 1989–1990 | Estrela | | |
| Total | | 78 | (7) |

International career
| 1975 | Portugal U18 | 8 | (2) |
- * Club domestic league appearances and goals

Manuel Francisco Salvador (born 1 February 1957), known as Cavungi, is a Portuguese retired footballer who played as a left winger.

== Career ==
Born in Luanda, Cavungi is a youth product from S.L. Benfica. In 1975–76, with Mário Wilson as manager, he made his professional debut on 11 April 1976, against CUF. In the next seasons, the best he could do, was starting 9 league games in 1977–78, with 2 goals. In 1980–81, he was loaned to S.C. Braga, making ten starts in twenty appearances.

Released in 1982–83, he joined G.C. Alcobaça, in the team debut season in the Primeira Divisão, ending in relegation. From then on, he played only in the lower divisions.

== International career ==
Cavungi represented his nation at under-18 level in the Tournoi Juniors de Cannes, and the qualification for the 1975 UEFA European Under-18 Championship.

== Honours ==
Benfica

- Primeira Liga: 1975–76, 1976–77
- Taça de Portugal: 1979–80
