= Carlos Alhinho =

Portuguese footballer and manager

Personal information
- Full name: Carlos Alexandre Fortes Alhinho
- Date of birth: 10 January 1949
- Place of birth: São Vicente, Cape Verde
- Date of death: 31 May 2008 (aged 59)
- Place of death: Benguela, Angola
- Height: 1.86 m (6 ft 1 in)
- Position: Centre back

Youth career
- 1963–1965: Académica Mindelo
- 1965–1968: Académica

Senior career*
Years	Team	Apps	(Gls)
1968–1972	Académica	95	(3)
1972–1975	Sporting CP	77	(2)
1975	Betis	0	(0)
1976	Porto	19	(0)
1976	Benfica	22	(2)
1977–1978	Molenbeek	19	(1)
1978–1981	Benfica	52	(0)
1979	→ New England Tea Men (loan)	16	(1)
1981–1983	Portimonense	51	(9)
1983–1984	Farense	21	(0)
Total		372	(18)

International career
1973–1982	Portugal	15	(0)

Managerial career
- 1984–1985: Lusitano Évora
- 1985–1986: Cape Verde
- 1986–1989: Académico Viseu
- 1989–1990: Penafiel
- 1990–1991: Portimonense
- 1991–1992: Académico Viseu
- 1994–1996: Angola
- 1996–1997: FAR Rabat
- 1998–2000: Atlético Aviação
- 2000: Angola
- 2001–2002: Badajoz
- 2002–2003: Al Ahli
- 2003–2004: Al Gharafa
- 2004–2005: Qatar SC
- 2005–2006: Al-Muharraq
- 2006: Petro Atlético
- 2007: Al-Qadsiah
- * Club domestic league appearances and goals

Carlos Alexandre Fortes Alhinho (10 January 1949 – 31 May 2008) was a Portuguese professional football central defender and manager.

He was one of the few players in his generation to have played for the Big Three in Portugal – Sporting, Benfica and Porto. Over 15 seasons, he amassed Primeira Liga totals of 337 matches and 17 goals.

Prior to his death in 2008, Alhinho worked as a coach for more than 20 years, in numerous clubs and countries.

== Club career ==
Born in São Vicente, Cape Verde, Alhinho moved to Portugal shortly after. He made his professional debut with Académica de Coimbra in the 1968–69 season after having joined its youth system at the age of 16 from Académica do Mindelo, appearing in 14 matches as the team finished in sixth position in the Primeira Liga.

After three further seasons in Coimbra, Alhinho signed for Sporting CP, winning his first national championship in 1973–74 and never missing a game in two of his three seasons. In 1975 he moved to La Liga side Real Betis but, unsettled, returned to his country of adoption a mere months after, joining FC Porto.

In the next five years, Alhinho would be mainly linked contractually to S.L. Benfica, winning another league in 1976–77. During his tenure, however, he also played in Belgium with R.W.D. Molenbeek– rejoining his former club after one season – and in the North American Soccer League for the New England Tea Men, loaned.

Aged 33, Alhinho left Benfica, played three more years in the Portuguese top flight, with Portimonense S.C. and S.C. Farense (without ever suffering relegation) and retired from football. He immediately started coaching, with modest Lusitano GC; in the following 22 years he managed teams in Portugal (two in the top division), Morocco, Angola, Qatar, Bahrain and Saudi Arabia.

== International career ==
Alhinho represented Portugal internationally, earning 15 caps over a period of nine years. His debut came on 28 March 1973 in a 1–1 draw with Northern Ireland for the 1974 FIFA World Cup qualifiers, and his last game happened on 5 May 1982 in a 1–3 friendly loss with Brazil.

In one of his first coaching jobs, in 1985, Alhinho managed the Cape Verdean national team, working with Angola nine years later and again in 2000.

== Death ==
On 31 May 2008, Alhinho opened the doors of the elevator on the sixth floor of his hotel in Benguela and stepped in, only to find the carriage was not there but on the ground floor. He plunged five floors onto the top of the cabin and, despite receiving immediate medical attention, died shortly afterwards at the age of 59.
