= Estádio Mário Duarte =

Football stadium in Aveiro, Portugal

Coordinates: 40.6336°N 8.6522°W

- "O Velhinho"
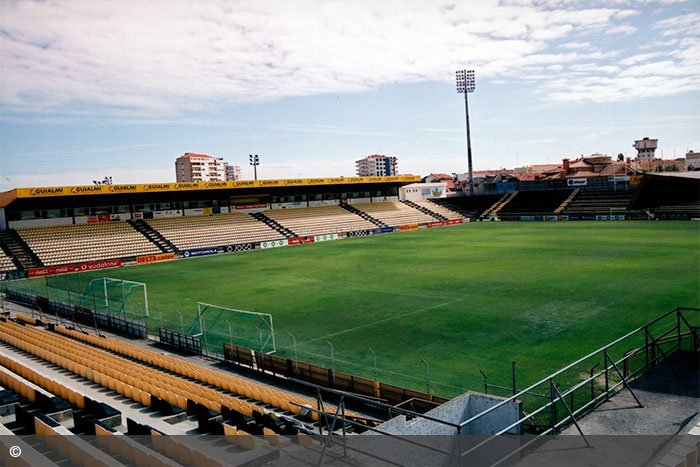
- Interactive map of Estádio Mário Duarte
- Full name: Estádio Mário Duarte
- Location: Aveiro, Portugal
- Owner: S.C. Beira-Mar
- Operator: S.C. Beira-Mar
- Capacity: 12,000
- Surface: Grass
- Scoreboard: No

Construction
- Opened: 1935
- Renovated: 2015
- Demolished: 2020

Tenant
- S.C. Beira-Mar (1935–2003; 2015–2019)

Estádio Mário Duarte was a football stadium in Aveiro, Portugal. It was used as the stadium of S.C. Beira-Mar matches. The capacity of the stadium was 12,000 spectators. It was demolished in the summer of 2020 as part of the expansion plans of the city's hospital.

== Naming ==
The name of the stadium comes from a Portuguese football player from Anadia, called Mário Duarte. Although he himself never had any connection to S.C. Beira-Mar, he was a famous person, often associated with the city of Aveiro. After the stadium's opening in 1935, it was decided that it would have his name, due to his social importance in the city of Aveiro.

The nickname "O Velhinho" ("The Old One", in English) refers not only to the age of the stadium, but to the fact that it was abandoned for 12 years. Beira-Mar fans never quite accepted the club's moving to the more recent and larger Estádio Municipal de Aveiro, as both the club and the stadium have a deep emotional connection to the fans.
