= Rui Lopes =

Bissau-Guinean footballer

Personal information
- Full name: Rui José Lopes
- Date of birth: 6 March 1962 (age 64)
- Place of birth: Guinea-Bissau
- Position: Forward

Senior career*
Years	Team	Apps	(Gls)
1982–1984	Amarante FC		
1983–1984	→ Leixões (loan)	29	(12)
1984–1986	Rio Ave	43	(14)
1986–1987	FC Famalicão	13	(1)
1987–1989	Fafe	8	(1)
1989–1990	Águeda	25	(4)
1990–1991	Leça	20	(4)
1991–1992	FC Felgueiras	14	(1)
1992–1993	SC Lamego		
1993–1994	Trofense		
- * Club domestic league appearances and goals

Rui José Lopes (born 6 March 1962) is a retired Bissau-Guinean footballer who played as a forward.
