= Shéu =

Portuguese football manager and former player

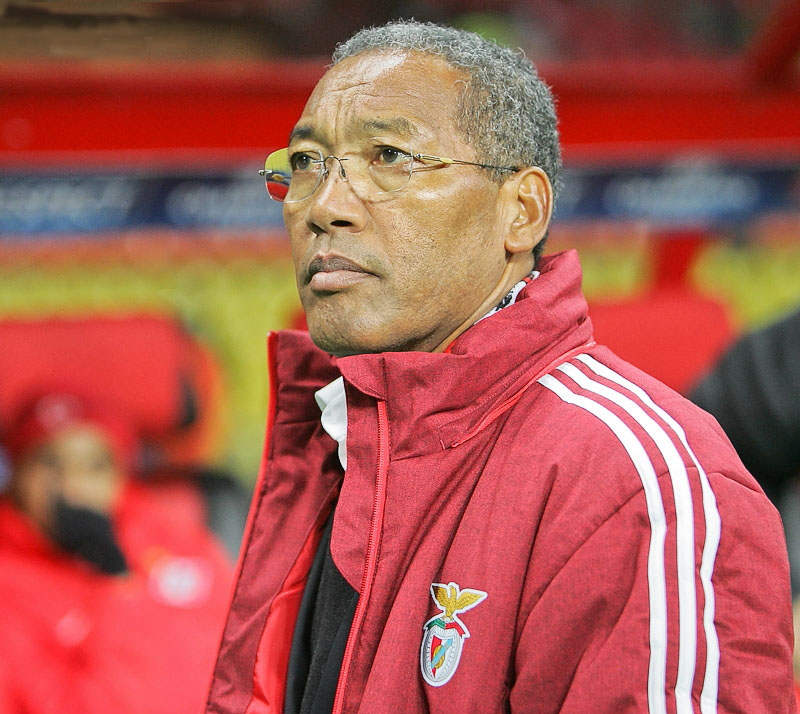
- Shéu with Benfica in 2012

Personal information
- Full name: Shéu Han
- Date of birth: 3 August 1953 (age 73)
- Place of birth: Inhassoro, Mozambique
- Height: 1.78 m (5 ft 10 in)
- Position: Midfielder

Youth career
- 1970–1972: Benfica

Senior career*
Years	Team	Apps	(Gls)
1972–1989	Benfica	349	(33)
1989	First Portuguese		

International career
1971	Portugal U18	10	(1)
1975–1977	Portugal U21	7	(0)
1976–1986	Portugal	24	(1)

Managerial career
- 1999: Benfica (caretaker)
- * Club domestic league appearances and goals

Shéu Han (born 3 August 1953), known simply as Shéu (Portuguese pronunciation: [ˈʃɛw]), is a Portuguese former professional footballer who played as a central midfielder.

He represented Benfica for 17 years of his career. He also served as their caretaker manager in 1999.

== Club career ==
Born in Inhassoro, Portuguese Mozambique and of Chinese descent, Shéu arrived in Portugal in 1970, joining S.L. Benfica's youth system and making his first appearance with the main squad in October 1972, but only became a regular three seasons later.

Shéu would all but remain in Lisbon until the end of his career and even captained the team from 1987 to 1988. He was an important member in the conquest of nine Primeira Liga championships and six Taça de Portugal.

In addition, Shéu played in the 1983 UEFA Cup final which his side lost to RSC Anderlecht 2–1 on aggregate, scoring the first goal in the return leg in the Portuguese capital, and also helped them to the 1988 European Cup final, a penalty shootout defeat to PSV Eindhoven. He took part in 489 competitive games during his tenure, only surpassed in midfield by another club legend and compatriot, Mário Coluna.

After retiring at 36 following a brief spell in the Canadian National Soccer League with Toronto First Portuguese, Shéu became a coach, serving as assistant for Benfica and in other several directorial capacities for more than two decades. In May 1999, after Graeme Souness' departure, he acted as interim manager.

Shéu left his post as technical secretary at the end of the 2017–18 campaign, but he remained at the Estádio da Luz.

== International career ==
Shéu was capped 24 times for the Portugal national team. He made his debut on 7 April 1976 in a 3–1 friendly loss against Italy in Turin, and scored his only goal on 23 September 1981 to help the hosts to defeat Poland 2–0 in another exhibition game.

Shéu featured twice for the nation during Euro 1984's qualifying campaign, including in the decisive 1–0 win over the Soviet Union in November 1983, but did not make the final squad that eventually reached the semi-finals in France.

Shéu: International goals
No.	Date	Venue	Opponent	Score	Result	Competition
1	23 September 1981	Estádio José Alvalade (1956), Lisbon, Portugal	Poland	2–0	2–0	Friendly

== Honours ==
Benfica

- Primeira Divisão: 1972–73, 1974–75, 1975–76, 1976–77, 1980–81, 1982–83, 1983–84, 1986–87, 1988–89
- Taça de Portugal: 1979–80, 1980–81, 1982–83, 1984–85, 1985–86, 1986–87
- Supertaça Cândido de Oliveira: 1980, 1985
- Taça de Honra (6)
- European Cup runner-up: 1987–88
- UEFA Cup runner-up: 1982–83
