= Vítor Baptista =

Portuguese footballer (1948–1999)

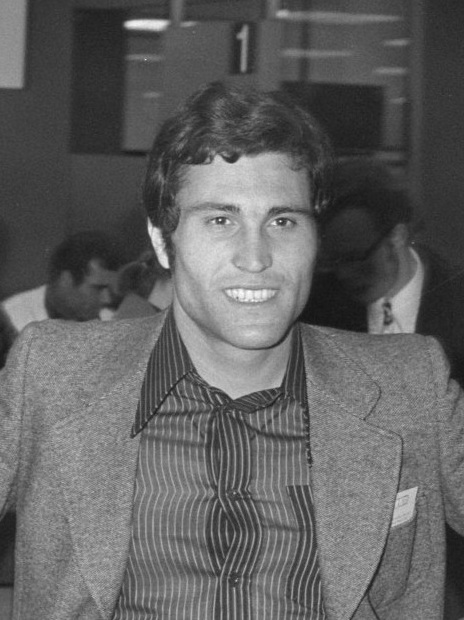
- Baptista in 1972

Personal information
- Full name: Vítor Manuel Ferreira Baptista
- Date of birth: 18 October 1948
- Place of birth: Setúbal, Portugal
- Date of death: 1 January 1999 (aged 50)
- Place of death: Setúbal, Portugal
- Height: 1.78 m (5 ft 10 in)
- Positions: Striker; midfielder

Youth career
- 1962–1967: Vitória Setúbal

Senior career*
Years	Team	Apps	(Gls)
1967–1971	Vitória Setúbal	76	(33)
1971–1978	Benfica	111	(50)
1978–1979	Vitória Setúbal	18	(7)
1979–1980	Boavista	15	(7)
1980	San Jose Earthquakes	1	(0)
1980–1981	Amora	4	(0)
1981–1982	Montijo (player-coach)	2	(0)
1982–1983	União Tomar		
1983–1984	Monte Caparica		
1984–1986	Estrelas Faralhão		
Total		227	(97)

International career
1971–1976	Portugal	11	(2)
- * Club domestic league appearances and goals

Vítor Manuel Ferreira Baptista (18 October 1948 – 1 January 1999) was a Portuguese footballer. Mainly a second striker, he could also operate as an attacking midfielder.

During a 15-year professional career, which was marred by several problems of indiscipline, he played mostly for Vitória de Setúbal (two spells) and Benfica, gaining international recognition with the latter, for which he amassed official totals of 150 games and 62 goals (128 matches and 52 goals for Setúbal).

== Club career ==
After working in his teens as an electrician, Baptista started playing organized football at the age of 13 in his hometown of Setúbal, with local Vitória FC. Four years later he received his first callup to the Portuguese national junior team, managed by José Maria Pedroto, and scored a combined 33 Primeira Liga goals in his last two seasons with the club, included a career-best 22 in only 26 games in the 1970–71 campaign, with the Sadinos eventually finishing in fourth position and subsequently qualifying to the UEFA Cup; he also led the team to two consecutive domestic cup finals, winning the tournament in 1967.

In the summer of 1971, Baptista signed for S.L. Benfica for a national record 3.000.000 escudos, in a deal which also included three players including veteran José Torres. He made his official debut on 26 September, and netted in a 3–0 away win against former team Vitória, going on to be part of the squad that won 54 league matches out of 60 over the course of two seasons to win back-to-back national championships, with the player contributing with 17 goals in only 31 appearances; his teammates during that timeframe included Humberto Coelho, Eusébio, Rui Jordão, Nené and António Simões.

After helping Benfica win a further three leagues, amidst several bouts of erratic and unprofessional behaviour, Batista demanded a pay rise and a new Porsche in 1978, with the club's board of directors only accepting the latter. He then returned to Vitória de Setúbal, earning a monthly wage of only 100.000 escudos, six times less what he asked of his previous team. He also played one season with Boavista FC (his 13th consecutive in the top division) before moving to the United States with the San Jose Earthquakes – upon invitation of former Benfica teammate Simões, who had previously played there – and notably partnering George Best at the California club.

Batista returned home after a couple of weeks, in spite of being handed a US$2.5 million contract and a Corvette. He retired from football in 1986 at nearly 38, after several seasons in amateur football, his last stop being Estrelas do Faralhão Futebol Clube; his Portuguese top division totals consisted of 224 games and 97 goals.

== International career ==
During five years, Baptista earned 11 caps for Portugal. His debut came on 17 February 1971 in a 0–3 loss against Belgium in Brussels for the UEFA Euro 1972 qualifiers.

Also during that competition, Baptista scored his only two goals for the national team, in a 5–0 home win over Denmark in Porto. After insulting manager Juca – he clashed with several coaches during his career – and some teammates minutes into a training to which he arrived late in 1976, he was expelled and never represented the country again.

Vítor Baptista: International goals
No.	Date	Venue	Opponent	Score	Result	Competition
1	12 May 1971	Estádio das Antas, Porto, Portugal	Denmark	3–0	5–0	Euro 1972 qualifying
2	12 May 1971	Estádio das Antas, Porto, Portugal	Denmark	4–0	5–0	Euro 1972 qualifying

== The "earring incident" ==
During a Lisbon derby against Sporting CP, Baptista lost his left earring minutes after scoring. He started looking for the missing object after realizing it was missing, in a scene that lasted almost five minutes; he refused to celebrate the final win, claiming he had "lost money" that day – the players each received 8,000 escudos for the two points, the piece was valued at 10,000. He subsequently added the moniker O Rapaz do Brinco (The Earring Boy) to the already existing O Maior (The Greatest), Gargantas (Loudmouth), O Rapaz dos Pés de Ouro (The Boy with the Golden Feet) and Meu Deus (My God).

== Death ==
Baptista struggled heavily with alcoholism and drug abuse still as an active player. In his last seasons, spent in the regional leagues, he resorted to stealing to support his habit, dying on New Year's Day 1999 at the age of 50.

== Honours ==
Vitória de Setúbal

- Taça de Portugal: 1966–67

Benfica

- Primeira Liga: 1971–72, 1972–73, 1974–75, 1975–76, 1976–77
- Taça de Portugal: 1971–72
