= Estádio do Bonfim =

Stadium in Setúbal, Portugal

Coordinates: 38.531°N 8.891°W

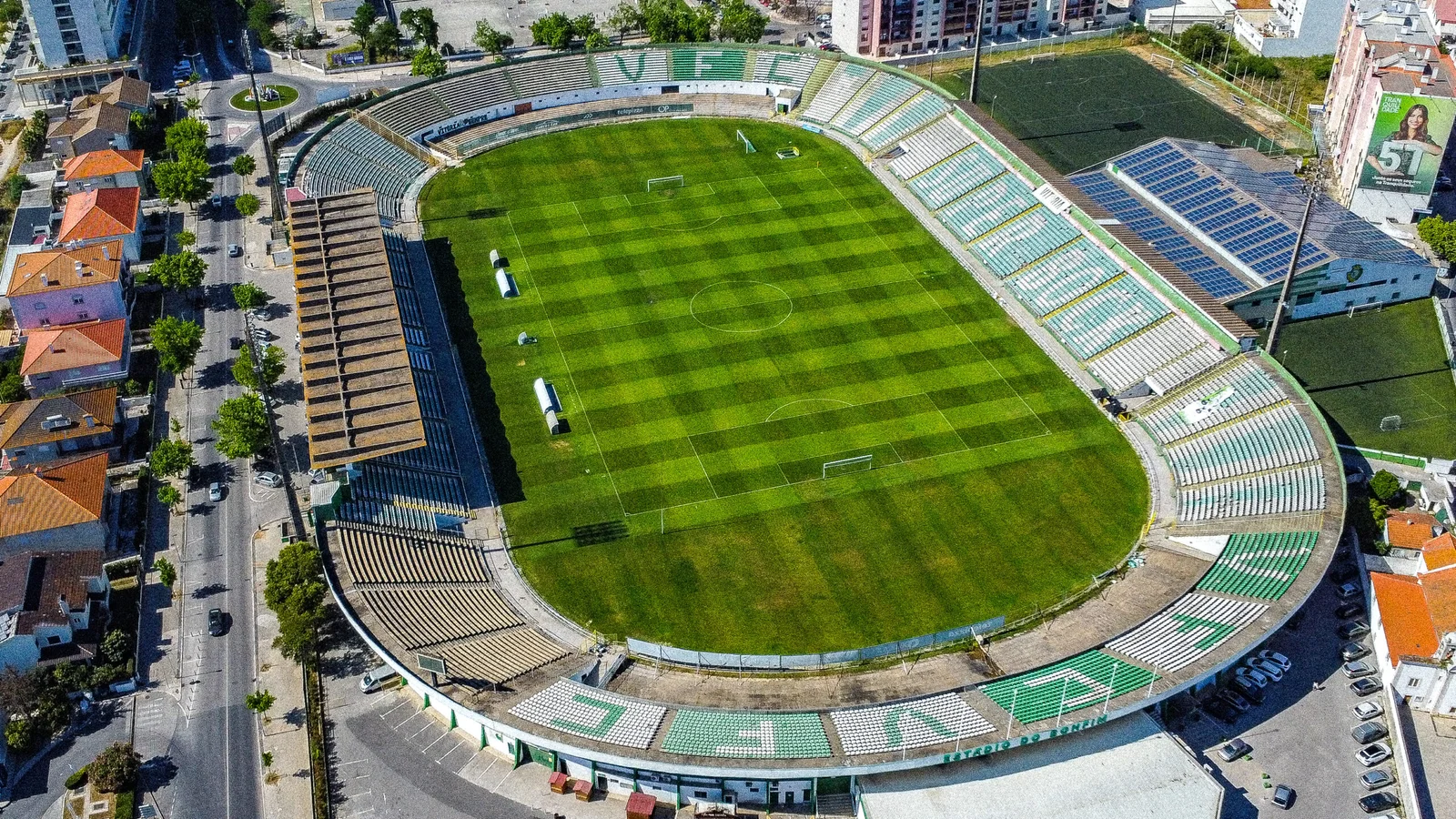
- Interactive map of Estádio do Bonfim
- Full name: Estádio do Bonfim
- Location: Setúbal, Portugal
- Owner: Vitória de Setúbal
- Capacity: 15,497
- Surface: Grass
- Record attendance: 40,000 (4 November 1971); Vitória F.C. 4–0 FC Spartak Moscow
- Field size: 105 x 68 m

Construction
- Built: 1962
- Opened: 16 September 1962
- Architect: Cândido Palma de Melo

Tenant
- Vitória F.C.

The Estádio do Bonfim (English: Bonfim Stadium) is a multi-purpose stadium in Setúbal, Portugal. It is currently used primarily for football matches for Vitória F.C. The stadium was built in 1962 and was able to hold 18,694 spectators. Currently the stadium holds 15,497 spectators.

Estádio do Bonfim enjoys a prime location within Setubal less than 1.0 km from the main railway station and the historic city centre.

It used to be one of the most modern infrastructures in Portugal. In the present day the stadium is outdated although being one of the main symbols of the Setúbal city and Portuguese football.

On 4 February 2019, the ground staged Belenenses SAD's home Primeira Liga fixture against Moreirense F.C. due to the condition of the pitch at their regular venue, the Estádio Nacional in Oeiras. The game attracted only 298 spectators, the lowest in the history of Portugal's top division.

== Portugal national team matches ==
The following national team matches were held in the stadium.

#	Date	Score	Opponent	Competition
1.	3 December 1975	1–0	Cyprus	Euro 1976 qualifying
2.	20 September 1978	1–0	United States	Friendly
3.	31 August 1989	0–0	Romania	Friendly
4.	20 August 1997	3–1	Armenia	World Cup 1998 qualification
5.	18 November 1998	2–0	Israel	Friendly
6.	5 June 2004	4–1	Lithuania	Friendly
