= Estádio 1º de Maio =

Stadium in Braga, Portugal

1 May Stadium Estádio 1.º de Maio
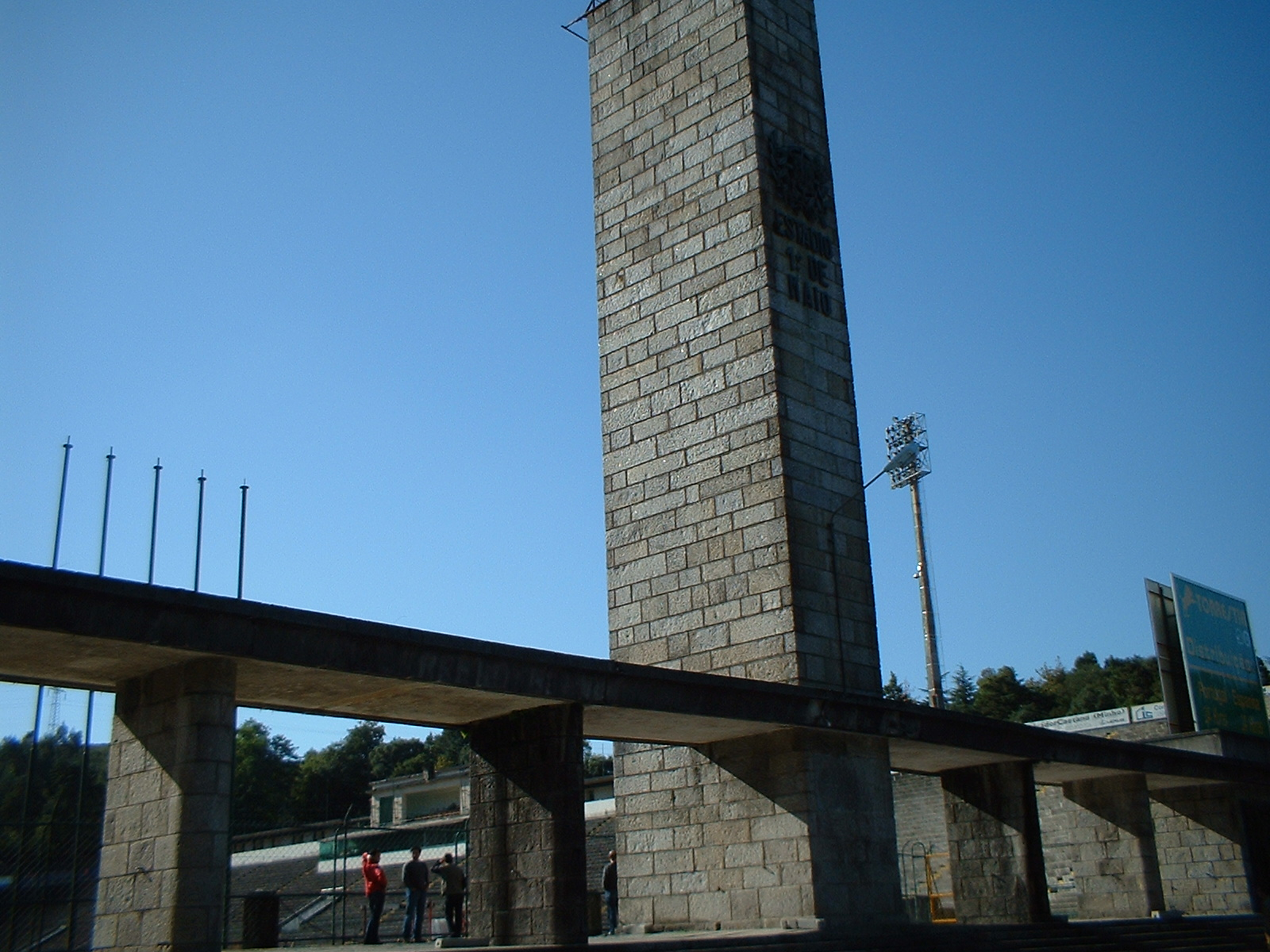
- Interactive map of 1 May Stadium; Estádio 1.º de Maio
- Full name: Estádio Primeiro de Maio/Estádio 1.º de Maio
- Former names: Estádio Municipal 28 de Maio
- Location: Braga, Braga (São José de São Lázaro e São João do Souto)
- Coordinates: 41.5388°N 8.4206°W
- Owner: Câmara Municipal de Braga
- Capacity: 28,000
- Surface: Synthetic

Construction
- Built: 1946
- Opened: 28 May 1950
- Architect: Travassos Valdez
- General contractor: Azevedo Campos
- Main contractor: Azevedo Campos

The 1 May Stadium (Portuguese: Estádio Primeiro de Maio/Estádio 1.º de Maio) is a multi-purpose stadium in civil parish of Braga (São José de São Lázaro e São João do Souto) in the municipality of Braga, in the district of the same name, in Portugal. Built in 1950 to host mostly football matches, the stadium has the capacity to seat 28,000 spectators.

== History ==
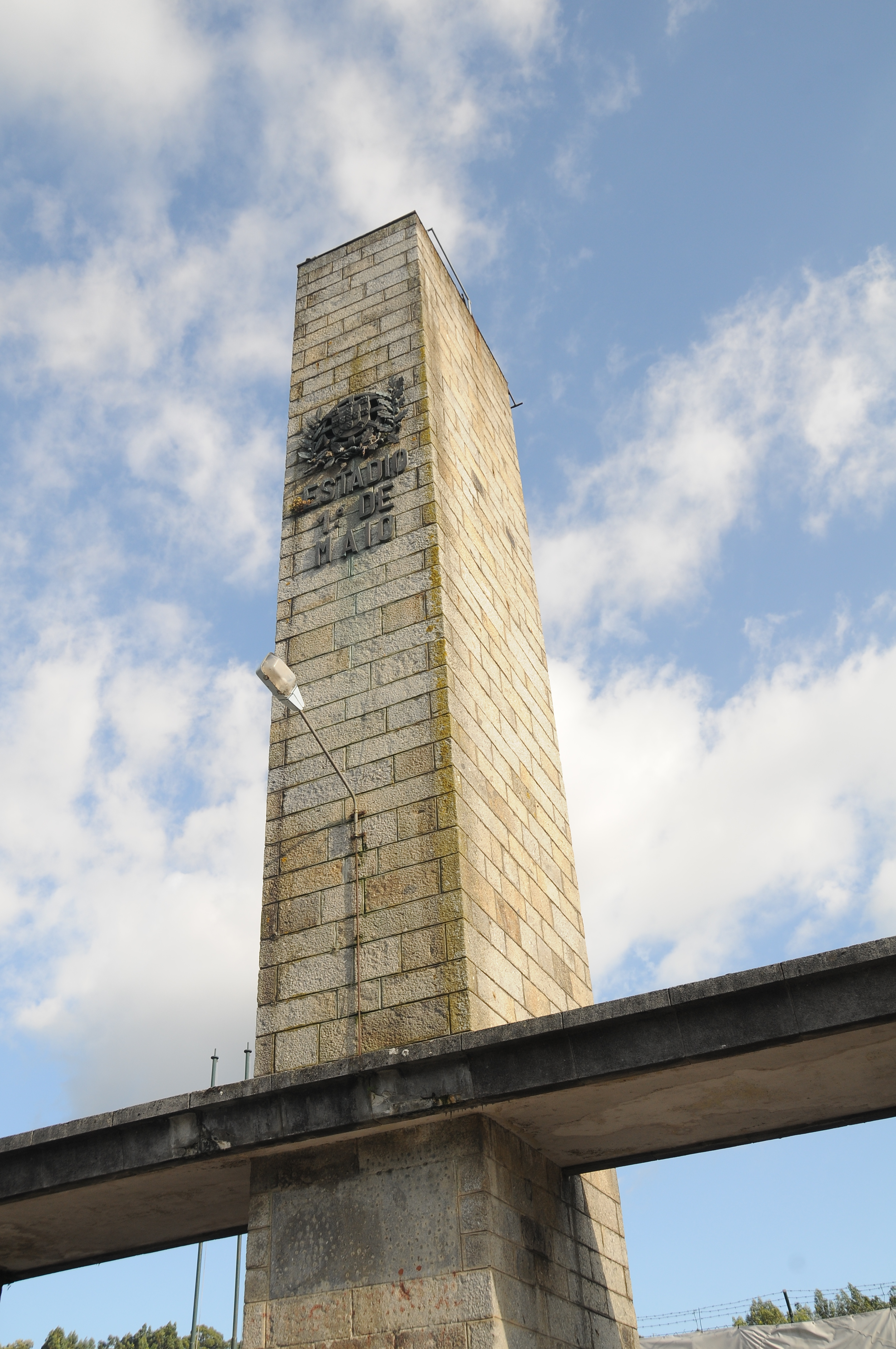
The distinctive entrance tower at the main gate

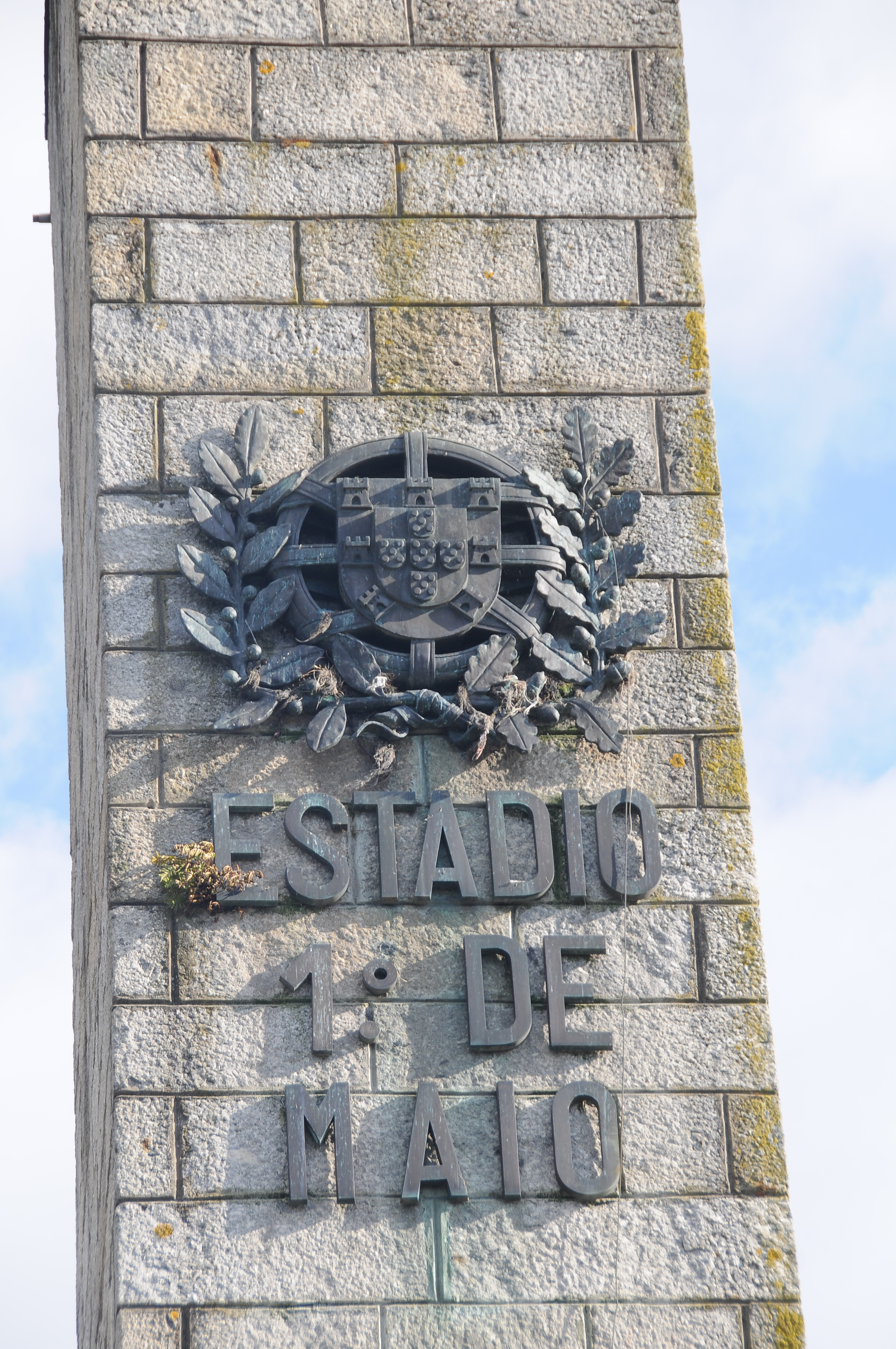
The ornamental sculpture on the entrance tower

In 1921, a group of youth formed the Sporting Clube de Braga, with the formal institutions being organized the following year, including official statutes. The "team" rented time in the Campo do Raio in order to practice and play competitive matches.

By the second half of the 20th century, the club rented various fields including successively the Campo da Ponte, Campo dos Peões and the new Campo da Ponte. In 1946, construction began on the stadium that would be known as 1º Maio, under the direction of Travassos Valdez, with the intent of commemorating the 21st anniversary of the 28 May Revolution. It was constructed by the Direcção-Geral dos Serviços de Urbanização (Directorate-General for Urban Services), with Sporting Clube de Braga as its principal tenant.

The stadium was inaugurated on 28 May 1950, by President General Óscar Carmona (and accompanied by António de Oliveira Salazar), as the Estádio Municipal 28 de Maio (28 May Municipal Stadium).

Following the Carnation Revolution in 1974, the stadium's name was changed to Estádio 1º de Maio.

In 1980, during the 60th anniversary of the sporting club, the Câmara Municipal de Braga attributed to the S.C. Braga a gold medallion from the city.

In 1990, the south bunks of the stadium fell into ruins, as a consequence public works to remedy the damage were initiated, with the intent of having the stadium used for the World Sub-21 Football Championship (which occurred the following year).

The construction of a glass corridor over metallic profile to provide access between the grandstands and private boxes and the remodelling of the change rooms were undertaken. At the same time the pitch was substituted: a synthetic pitch was installed and new lighting was installed.

Following the visit of the Secretário de Estado dos Desportos (Secretary-of-State for Sport) in 1996, a process to initiate repairs to the stadium was proposed, and the funds necessary for the project were solicited.

On 18 February 1998, ASPA sent to the IPPAR an official request to classify the stadium as national patrimony, resulting in the opening of a process on 17 February 2006. This was after the opening of Estádio Municipal de Braga in 2003 (for the UEFA Euro 2004), leading to the stadiums repurposing for athletics competitions and amateur football competitions, including the youth of S.C. Braga. At that time, the field was repaired and the drainage system was renovated. By 15 April 2011 a proposal was made to include the stadium within a Special Protection Zone by the DRCNorte. This proposal was accepted by the SPAA of the National Council of Culture on 11 January 2012, leading to the 28 September publication of the respective decision to classify the stadium as a Monumento de Interesse Público (Public Interest Monument) and fixing the structure within this Special Protection Zone.

After the refounding of S.C. Braga reserves team in 2012, the stadium underwent improvements to comply with the Second League requirements, limiting its capacity to 5000 seats.

== Architecture ==
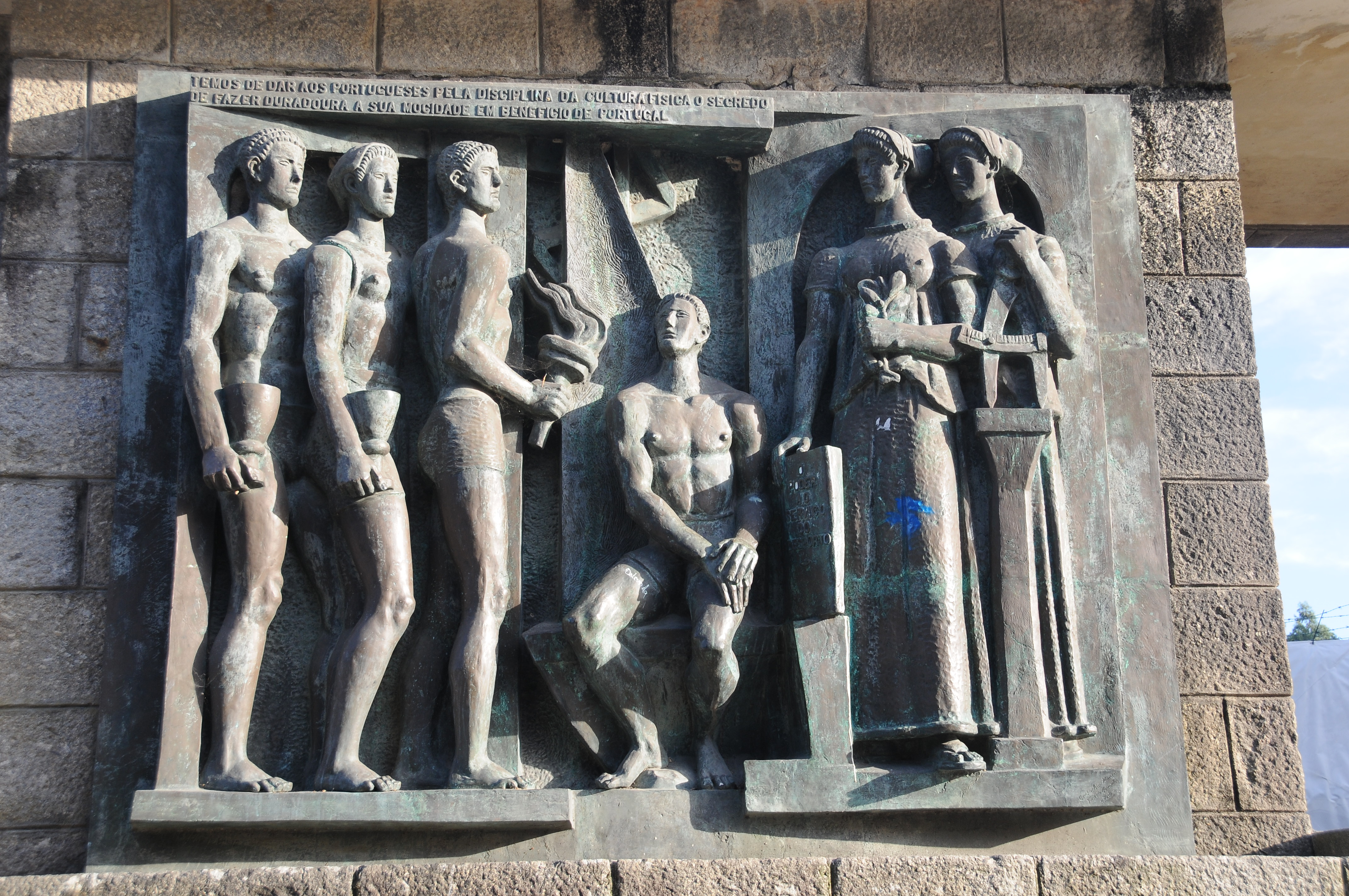
The relief sculpture with the inscription, ...discipline of physical culture...[to] benefit...Portugal

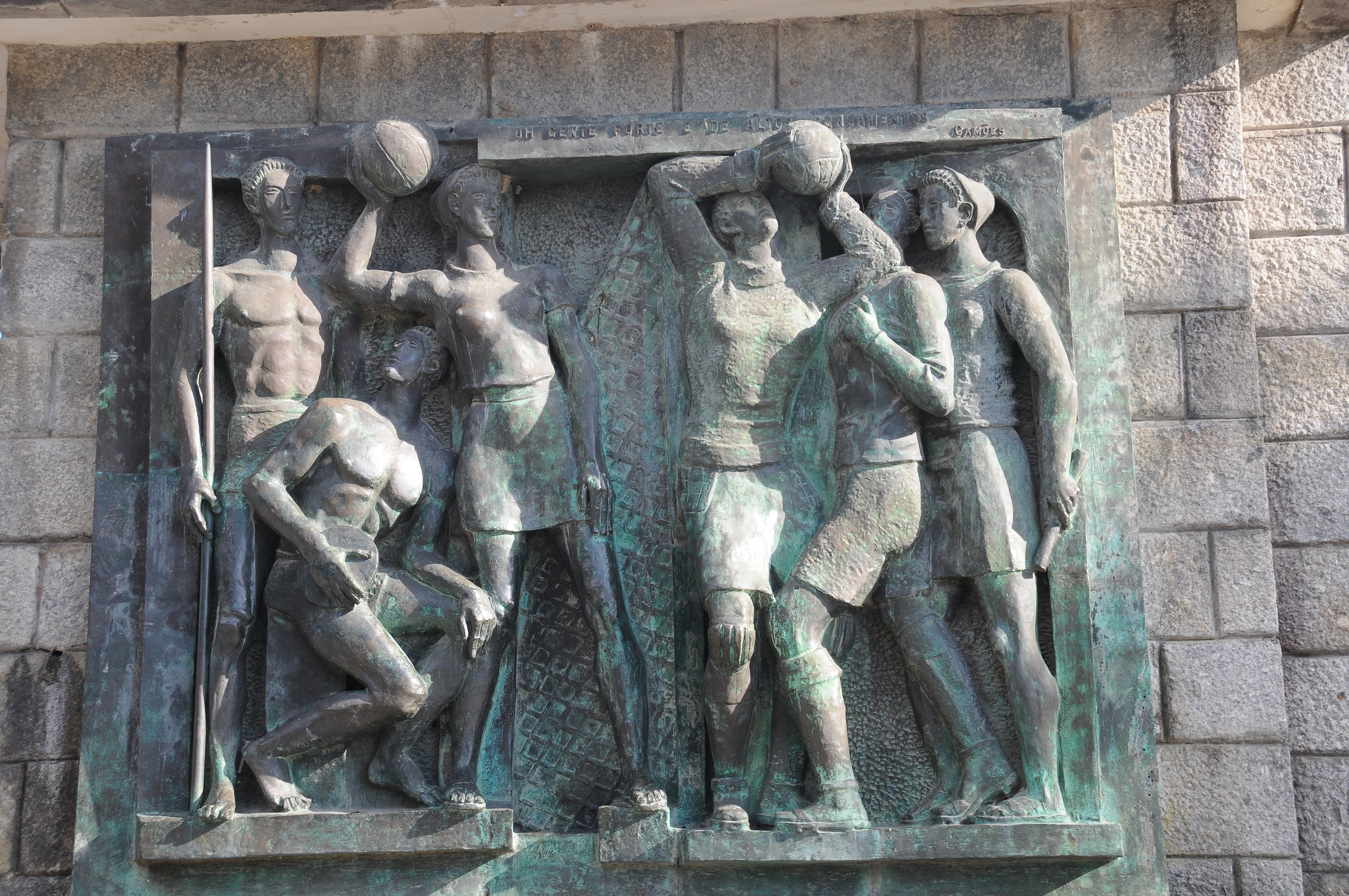
Sculpted bronze panel quoting Camões

The urban structure is implanted harmoniously along a slope from the terrain, rounding the E.N. 101 national roadway and matte of vegetation that constituted the Parque de Campismo and Parque da Ponte.

The stadium has four lampposts at the corners. The field is surrounded by an athletics track. The west stand is finished off in the front by the coat-of-arms of the city of Braga. The main facade, facing the north, with rounded ends, doors on the first floor and rectangular windows on the second. In the center, is a wide two-story staircase with access to the main gate, bounded by rounded structures that integrate two sculpture panels in bronze, depicting sport with the inscription:

TEMOS DE DAR AOS PORTUGUESES PELA DISCIPLINA DA CULTURA FÍSICA O SEGREDO DE FAZER DURADOURA A SUA MOCIDADE EM BENEFÍCIO DE PORTUGAL
We have to give the Portuguese, by the discipline of physical culture, the secret to make your lasting youth a benefit to Portugal

While the second quotes Luís Camões:

OH GENTE FORTE E DE ALTOS PENSAMENTOS
Oh, strong people and of high thoughts

The entrance, organized by geometric modules, develops six openings that line, symmetrically, prismatic tower, tall and slender, with the shield of the Republic and inscription in bronze at the top. The side walls are broken on the first floor by wide doors that access the stands and in the east-north northeast two stair access to the second floor. In the west is a central portal with square-framed bas-relief sculpture, consisting of bay leaves and surmounted by the shield of the club, and addorsed to the left by lanky body, glassed on metal profiles, which serves as the presidential tribune access corridor, press tribune and cabins.

== Portugal national team matches ==
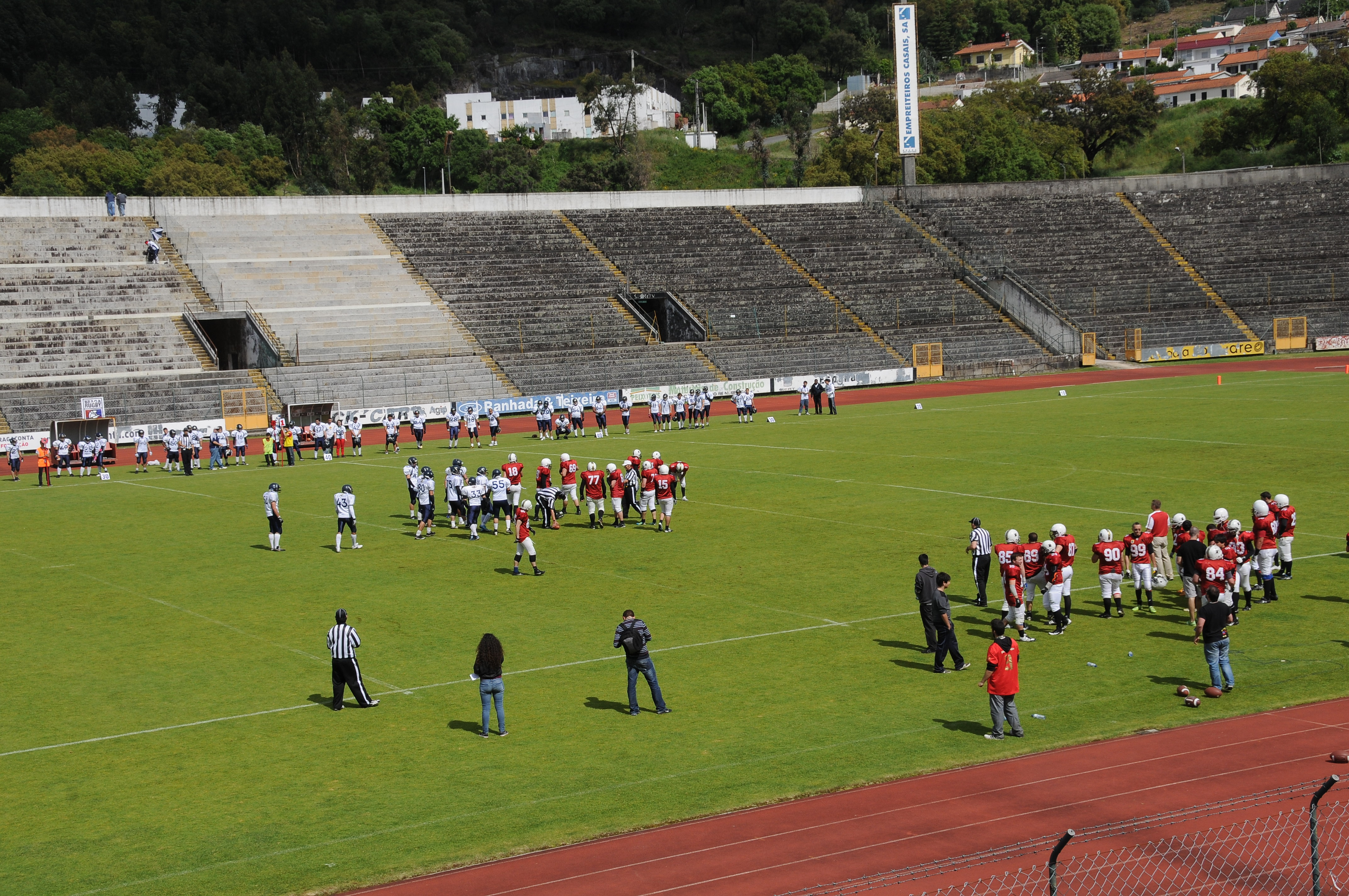
A unique game of American football in the 1 May Stadium in 2012

The following national team matches were held in the stadium.

#	Date	Score	Opponent	Competition
1.	19 January 1986	1–3	East Germany	Friendly
2.	4 February 1987	1–0	Belgium	Friendly
3.	22 January 1997	0–2	France	Friendly
4.	15 November 2000	2–1	Israel	Friendly
5.	20 November 2002	2–0	Scotland	Friendly
6.	6 June 2003	0–0	Paraguay	Friendly
