= Minervino Pietra =

Portuguese footballer (1954–2024)

Personal information
- Full name: Minervino José Lopes Pietra
- Date of birth: 1 March 1954
- Place of birth: Lisbon, Portugal
- Date of death: 7 March 2024 (aged 70)
- Place of death: Portugal
- Height: 1.72 m (5 ft 8 in)
- Position: Right-back

Youth career
- Belenenses

Senior career*
Years	Team	Apps	(Gls)
1971–1976	Belenenses	96	(9)
1976–1987	Benfica	227	(19)
Total		323	(28)

International career
1971	Portugal U18	2	(0)
1973–1974	Portugal U21	4	(1)
1973–1983	Portugal	28	(1)

Managerial career
- 1989–1990: Boavista (assistant)
- 1990–1992: Alverca
- 1992–1993: Juventude Évora
- 1994: Boavista (assistant)
- 1994–1996: Belenenses (assistant)
- 1996: Boavista (assistant)
- 1997–1998: Alverca (assistant)
- 1998–1999: Estoril (assistant)
- 1999–2000: Estoril
- 2000–2001: Barreirense
- 2009–2022: Benfica (assistant)
- * Club domestic league appearances and goals

Minervino José Lopes Pietra (1 March 1954 – 7 March 2024) was a Portuguese footballer who played as a right-back.

He appeared in 323 Primeira Liga games over the course of 16 seasons, with Belenenses and Benfica (28 goals scored). Subsequently, he became a manager, working mainly as an assistant and having spells with both clubs.

Pietra was a Portugal international in the 70s and 80s.

== Club career ==
Born in Lisbon, Pietra started his professional career with local C.F. Os Belenenses, making nearly 150 official appearances with the first team in his five-year Primeira Liga spell and scoring nine goals. In 1976 the 22-year-old signed for S.L. Benfica, where he would remain until his retirement.

With Benfica, Pietra won, always as an important defensive unit, the league in 1977, 1981, 1983 and 1984, adding five Taça de Portugal trophies. In 11 seasons he appeared in 320 games in all competitions, netting on 25 occasions; he also helped the club to the 1982–83 UEFA Cup final, lost to Belgium's R.S.C. Anderlecht (1–0 abroad, 1–1 at home).

In the mid-1990s, Pietra began working as a manager, successively with Boavista FC, Belenenses, Benfica, F.C. Alverca (under his former Benfica teammate António Veloso, his fullback counterpart), F.C. Barreirense and G.D. Estoril Praia, the latter two as head coach. After nearly one decade out of the game he returned to Benfica in 2007, acting as match scout for two years then joining Jorge Jesus' coaching staff two years later, remaining with the side for several seasons in the latter capacity.

== International career ==
Pietra earned 28 caps for Portugal, his first game being on 14 November 1973 in a 1–1 draw against Northern Ireland for the 1974 FIFA World Cup qualifiers, at the age of only 19. He appeared regularly the following years, but did not attend any major international tournament.

Pietra's last match was on 21 September 1983 in a 5–0 win over Finland for the UEFA Euro 1984 qualification stages. Portugal reached the finals in France, but he was overlooked for the squad that eventually finished third.

Minervino Pietra: International goals
No.	Date	Venue	Opponent	Score	Result	Competition
1	14 October 1981	Estádio da Luz (1954), Lisbon, Portugal	Sweden	1–1	1–2	1982 World Cup qualification

== Death ==
Pietra died on 7 March 2024, shortly after celebrating his 70th birthday.

== Honours ==
Benfica

- Primeira Divisão: 1976–77, 1980–81, 1982–83, 1983–84
- Taça de Portugal (5)
- Supertaça Cândido de Oliveira (2)
- Taça de Honra (2)
