= 1979 Taça de Portugal final =

- Event: 1978–89 Taça de Portugal
Boavista	Sporting CP
Boavista	Sporting CP
1	1
- Date: 30 June 1979
- Venue: Estádio Nacional, Oeiras
- Referee: Marques Pires (Setúbal)

Replay
Boavista	Sporting CP
1	0
- Date: 1 July 1979
- Venue: Estádio Nacional, Oeiras
- Referee: Rosa Santos (Beja)

The 1979 Taça de Portugal final was the final match of the 1978–79 Taça de Portugal, the 39th season of the Taça de Portugal, the premier Portuguese football cup competition organized by the Portuguese Football Federation (FPF). The final was played at the Estádio Nacional in Oeiras, and opposed two Primeira Liga sides Boavista and Sporting CP. As the inaugural final match finished 1–1, the final was replayed a day later at the same venue with Os Axadrezados defeating the Leões 1–0 to claim a third Taça de Portugal.

In Portugal, the final was televised live on RTP. As a result of Boavista winning the Taça de Portugal, Os Axadrezados qualified for the 1979 Supertaça Cândido de Oliveira where they took on 1978–79 Primeira Divisão winners Porto.

== Match ==
=== Details ===
30 June 1979

Boavista	1–1 (a.e.t.)	Sporting CP
Júlio Augusto 76'		Jordão 73'

Estádio Nacional, Oeiras
Referee: Marques Pires (Setúbal)

Boavista	Sporting CP

GK	1	(Portugal) Luís Matos
DF	(Portugal) Mário João (c)
DF	(Portugal) Artur Ferreira
DF	(Portugal) António Taí	(substituted off) 110'
DF	(Portugal) Manuel Barbosa
MF	(Portugal) Albertino Pereira
MF	(Portugal) Eliseu Ramalho
FW	(Portugal) Júlio Augusto
FW	(Portugal) Mário Moinhos	(substituted off) 105'
FW	(Brazil) Jorge Gomes
FW	(Brazil) Salvador Almeida
Substitutes:
DF	(Portugal) Amândio Barreiras	(substituted on) 110'
DF	(Portugal) Queiró	(substituted on) 105'
Manager:
(England) Jimmy Hagan

GK	1	(Portugal) António Botelho
DF	(Portugal) Marinho
DF	(Portugal) Vitorino Bastos (c)	(substituted off) 36'
DF	(Brazil) Paulo Meneses
DF	(Portugal) João Laranjeira
DF	(Portugal) Augusto Inácio
MF	(Brazil) Zandonaide Filho	(substituted off) 70'
FW	(Portugal) Samuel Fraguito
FW	(Portugal) Rui Jordão
FW	(Portugal) Manuel Fernandes
FW	(Portugal) Ademar Marques
Substitutes:
MF	(Portugal) Baltasar	(substituted on) 70'
FW	(Brazil) Manoel Costa	(substituted on) 36'
Manager:
(Socialist Federal Republic of Yugoslavia) Milorad Pavić

Match officials

- Assistant referees:
- Fourth official:

Match rules

- 90 minutes.
- 30 minutes of extra time if necessary.
- Maximum of two substitutions

== Replay ==
=== Details ===
1 July 1979

Boavista	1 – 0	Sporting CP
Júlio Augusto 40'

Estádio Nacional, Oeiras
Referee: Rosa Santos (Beja)

Boavista	Sporting CP

GK	1	(Portugal) Luís Matos
DF	(Portugal) António Taí
DF	(Portugal) Artur Ferreira
DF	(Portugal) Mário João (c)
MF	(Portugal) Eliseu Ramalho	Substituted off
MF	(Portugal) Albertino Pereira
MF	(Portugal) Manuel Barbosa
FW	(Portugal) Mário Moinhos	Substituted off
FW	(Portugal) Júlio Augusto
FW	(Brazil) Salvador Almeida
FW	(Brazil) Jorge Gomes
Substitutes:
DF	(Portugal) Amândio Barreiras	Substituted on
DF	(Portugal) Queiró	Substituted on
Manager:
(England) Jimmy Hagan

GK	1	(Portugal) António Botelho
DF	(Brazil) Paulo Meneses
DF	(Portugal) Marinho
DF	(Portugal) João Laranjeira (c)
DF	(Portugal) Augusto Inácio
MF	(Portugal) Baltasar
MF	(Portugal) Ademar Marques
FW	(Portugal) Samuel Fraguito
FW	(Portugal) Carlos Freire
FW	(Brazil) Manoel Costa	(substituted off) 46'
FW	(Portugal) Manuel Fernandes
Substitutes:
FW	(Portugal) Rui Jordão	(substituted on) 46'
Manager:
(Socialist Federal Republic of Yugoslavia) Milorad Pavić

1978–79 Taça de Portugal Winners
Boavista
3rd Title

Match officials

- Assistant referees:
- Fourth official:

Match rules

- 90 minutes.
- 30 minutes of extra time if necessary.
- Maximum of two substitutions
