= 1975 Taça de Portugal final =

- Event: 1974–75 Taça de Portugal
Benfica	Boavista
1	2
- Date: 14 June 1975
- Venue: Estádio José Alvalade, Lisbon
- Referee: António Garrido (Leiria)

The 1975 Taça de Portugal final was the final match of the 1974–75 Taça de Portugal, the 35th season of the Taça de Portugal, the premier Portuguese football cup competition organized by the Portuguese Football Federation (FPF). The match was played on 14 June 1975 at the Estádio José Alvalade in Lisbon, and opposed two Primeira Liga sides: Benfica and Boavista. Boavista defeated Benfica 2–1 to claim the Taça de Portugal for a first time.

== Match ==
=== Details ===
14 June 1975

Benfica	1–2	Boavista
Jordão 60'		Mané 15'; João Alves 17'

Estádio José Alvalade, Lisbon
Referee: António Garrido (Leiria)

Benfica	Boavista

GK	1	(Portugal) José Henrique
DF	(Portugal) Malta da Silva (c)
DF	(Portugal) António Bastos Lopes
DF	(Portugal) António Barros
MF	(Portugal) Vítor Martins	Booked	(substituted off) 67'
MF	(Portugal) Toni
MF	(Portugal) Messias Timula
MF	(Portugal) Shéu	(substituted off) 28'
MF	(Portugal) Diamantino Costa
FW	(Portugal) Rui Jordão
FW	(Portugal) Mário Moinhos
Substitutes:
MF	(Portugal) Ibraim Silva	(substituted on) 28'
MF	(Portugal) Vítor Moia	(substituted on) 67'
Manager:
(Socialist Federal Republic of Yugoslavia) Milorad Pavić

GK	1	(Portugal) António Botelho
RB	(Portugal) Leonel Trindade
CB	(Portugal) Álvaro Carolino
CB	(Portugal) Mário João (c)
LB	(Portugal) António Taí
AM	(Portugal) João Alves
DM	(Portugal) Celso de Matos
LM	(Portugal) Acácio Casimiro	(substituted off) 88'
FW	(Brazil) Mané	Booked	(substituted off) 74'
FW	(Brazil) Salvador Almeida
RM	(Portugal) Francisco Mário
Substitutes:
DF	(Portugal) Amândio Barreiras	(substituted on) 74'
MF	(Portugal) Manuel Barbosa	(substituted on) 88'
Manager:
(Portugal) José Maria Pedroto

1974–75 Taça de Portugal Winners
Boavista
1st Title

Match officials

- Assistant referees:
- Fourth official:

Match rules

- 90 minutes.
- 30 minutes of extra time if necessary.
- Maximum of two substitutions
