= 1979 Supertaça de Portugal =

- Event: Supertaça de Portugal (Portuguese Super Cup)
Boavista	Porto
2	1
- Date: 17 August 1979
- Venue: Estádio das Antas, Porto
- Referee: Silva Pereira (Porto)

The 1979 Supertaça de Portugal was the 1st edition of the Supertaça de Portugal although not the 1st official edition, the annual Portuguese football season-opening match contested by the winners of the previous season's top league and cup competitions (or cup runner-up in case the league- and cup-winning club is the same). The 1979 Supertaça de Portugal took place at the Estádio das Antas in Porto, home of FC Porto on the 17 August 1979, thus opening the 1979-1980 season. It was contested between two team from the city of Porto, F.C. Porto, the winners of the 1978–79 Primeira Divisão, and Boavista F.C., the winners of the 1978–79 Taça de Portugal.

Os Axadrezados defeated the Dragões 2–1 to claim the first Supertaça de Portugal thanks to two goals in either half from centre forward Júlio Augusto. Boavista saw two players sent off in the last 10 minutes of the game, but Porto were unable to equalise the game. After the match was finished, some confrontations followed with Porto supporters, after the defeat in their home stadium, which resulted in the trophy not being delivered to the winners on the pitch. As a result, the trophy was delivered on the following week at Boavista's home ground, Estádio do Bessa.

== Match ==
=== Details ===
17 August 1979

Boavista	2–1	Porto
Augusto 1', 72'		Romeu 78'

Estádio das Antas, Porto
Referee: Silva Pereira (Porto)

Boavista	Porto

GK	1	(Portugal) Luís Matos
DF		(Portugal) António Taí
DF		(Portugal) Adão da Silva
DF		(Portugal) Artur Nogueira
MF		(Portugal) Eliseu Ramalho		(substituted off) 76'
MF		(Portugal) Óscar
MF		(Brazil) Ailton Ballesteros
MF		(Portugal) Manuel Barbosa (c)	(red card) 90'
FW		(Brazil) Salvador Almeida
FW		(Portugal) Júlio Augusto
FW		(Portugal) Mário Moinhos		(substituted off) 46'
Substitutes:
DF		(Portugal) Queiró	(red card) 82'	(substituted on) 46'
FW		(Portugal) Fernando Folha		(substituted on) 76'
Manager:
(Portugal) Mário Lino

GK	1	(Portugal) João Fonseca
DF	(Portugal) Jacinto Simões	(substituted off) 62'
DF	(Portugal) Carlos Simões (c)
DF	(Portugal) Alfredo Murça
MF	(Portugal) Quinito	(substituted off) 46'
MF	(Portugal) Rodolfo Reis
MF	(Portugal) António Frasco
MF	(Portugal) Romeu Silva
FW	(Portugal) Fernando Gomes
FW	(Portugal) José Alberto Costa
FW	(Portugal) Albertino Pereira
Substitutes:
FW	(Brazil) Duda	(substituted on) 46'
FW	(Portugal) Francisco Vital	(substituted on) 62'
Manager:
(Portugal) José Maria Pedroto

1979 Supertaça de Portugal
Boavista
1st Title

Match officials

- Assistant referees:
- Fourth official:

Match rules

- 90 minutes.
- Maximum of three substitutions
