= 1976 Taça de Portugal final =

- Event: 1975–76 Taça de Portugal
Boavista	Vitória de Guimarães
2	1
- Date: 13 June 1976
- Venue: Estádio das Antas, Porto
- Referee: António Garrido (Leiria)

The 1976 Taça de Portugal final was the final match of the 1975–76 Taça de Portugal, the 36th season of the Taça de Portugal, the premier Portuguese football cup competition organized by the Portuguese Football Federation (FPF). The match was played on 13 June 1976 at the Estádio das Antas in Porto, and opposed two Primeira Liga sides: Boavista and Vitória de Guimarães. Boavista were the defending champions, and they successfully defended their title defeating Vitória de Guimarães 2–1 to claim the Taça de Portugal for a second time.

== Match ==
=== Details ===
13 June 1976

Boavista	2–1	Vitória de Guimarães
Salvador 10', 49'		Rui Lopes 62'

Estádio das Antas, Porto
Referee: António Garrido (Leiria)

Boavista	Vitória de Guimarães

GK	1	(Portugal) António Botelho
RB	(Portugal) Leonel Trindade
CB	(Portugal) Álvaro Carolino
CB	(Portugal) Mário João (c)
LB	(Portugal) António Taí
AM	(Portugal) João Alves
MF	(Portugal) Manuel Barbosa	(substituted off) 46'
MF	(Portugal) Celso
MF	(Portugal) Acácio Casimiro	(substituted off) 82'
FW	(Brazil) Salvador Almeida
FW	(Portugal) Francisco Mário
Substitutes:
MF	(Portugal) Joaquim Lobo	(substituted on) 82'
FW	(Brazil) Mané	(substituted on) 46'
Manager:
(Portugal) José Maria Pedroto

GK	1	(Portugal) Francisco Rodrigues
DF	(Portugal) Osvaldinho (c)
DF	(Portugal) Rui Rodrigues
DF	(Portugal) José Alberto Torres
DF	(Portugal) Alfredo Guimarães
MF	(Brazil) Almiro Gonçalves
MF	(Brazil) Pedrinho	(substituted off) 72'
MF	(Portugal) José Abreu
MF	(Portugal) Ferreira da Costa
FW	(Portugal) Tito
FW	(Portugal) Rui Lopes
Substitutes:
MF	(Portugal) Bernardino Pedroto	(substituted on) 72'
Manager:
(Portugal) Fernando Caiado

1975–76 Taça de Portugal Winners
Boavista
2nd Title

Match officials

- Assistant referees:
- Fourth official:

Match rules

- 90 minutes.
- 30 minutes of extra time if necessary.
- Maximum of two substitutions
