= Francisco González =

Francisco González may refer to:

== Sports ==
=== Association football ===
- Paco González (footballer, born 1897) (1897–1976), Spanish forward turned manager
- Paco González (footballer, born 1951), Paraguayan midfielder
- Fran (footballer, born 1969) (Francisco Javier González Pérez, born 1969), Spanish midfielder turned manager
- Francisco González (footballer, born 1984), Mexican goalkeeper
- Francisco González (footballer, born 1988), Mexican midfielder
- Fran González (footballer, born 1989), Spanish defender for Atlético Porcuna
- Francisco González Metilli (born 1997), Argentine attacking midfielder for Belgrano
- Fran González (footballer, born 1998), Spanish centre-back for Atlético CP
- Francisco González (footballer, born 2001), Argentine forward for Defensa y Justicia

=== Other sports ===
- Francisco González (athlete) (1917-?), Mexican hammer thrower
- Francisco González (fencer) (1893–?), Spanish Olympic fencer
- Francisco González (tennis) (born 1955), Paraguayan tennis player
- Francisco González (volleyball) (born 1947), Mexican volleyball player

== Literature ==
- Francisco González Bocanegra (1824–1861), Mexican poet, wrote lyrics of the Mexican national anthem
- Francisco González Ledesma (1927–2015), Spanish journalist and novelist, winner of the Premio Planeta de Novela in 1984
- Paco González (journalist) (born 1966), Spanish sports journalist

== Other fields ==
- Francisco J. Gonzalez (born 1963), Spanish philosopher
- Francisco González (banker), chairman and chief executive of BBVA
- Francisco González (game designer), American game designer; developer of Ben Jordan: Paranormal Investigator and A Golden Wake
- Francisco González de la Vega (1901–1976), Mexican lawyer and politician
- Francisco González Gómez (1918–1990), Spanish caricaturist, painter and sculptor
- Francisco González Guinán (1841–1932), Venezuelan politician, journalist, lawyer, and historian
- Francisco González Valer (born 1939), Spanish-American Roman Catholic prelate
- Francisco González Vargas (born 1956), Mexican politician
- Pacific Air Lines Flight 773, a flight hijacked and brought down by a suicidal man named Francisco Gonzalez

== See also ==
- González (surname)
- Paco Gonzalez (disambiguation)
- Francisco Gonzales (disambiguation)
