= Paco Gonzalez =

Paco Gonzalez may refer to:

- Paco González (footballer, 1897-1976), Spanish forward turned manager
- Paco Gonzalez (horse trainer) (born 1945), Mexican horse racing trainer
- Paco González (footballer, born 1951), Paraguayan midfielder
- Paco González (journalist) (born 1966), Spanish sports journalist

== See also ==
- Francisco González (disambiguation)
