= Pantera Negra =

Pantera Negra, Spanish or Portuguese for "Black Panther", may refer to:

- A fan group of Portuguese football club Boavista F.C.
- Panteras Negras F.C., Portuguese football club set up by the above
- A nickname of Eusébio (1942–2014), Portuguese footballer
- A nickname of Ergilio Hato (1926–2003), Curaçaoan footballer
- La Pantera Negra, 2024 album by Myke Towers
- Las Panteras Negras, a squadron of the Chilean Air Force

== See also ==
- Black panther (disambiguation)
- Black Pantera, Brazilian thrash metal band
