= Eriska =

Flat tidal island at the entrance to Loch Creran on the west coast of Scotland

ùruisg, (Gaelic)

Location
- Location within Argyll and Bute
- OS grid reference: NM902429
- Coordinates: 56.532°N 5.412°W

Name
- Name meaning: 'water nymph island' or 'Erik's island'
- Old Norse name: Aoraisge

Physical geography
- Island group: Loch Linnhe
- Area: 145 hectares (360 acres)
- Area rank: 124=
- Highest elevation: 47 metres (154 ft)

Administration
- Council area: Argyll and Bute
- Country: Scotland
- Sovereign state: United Kingdom

Demographics
- Population: 21
- Population rank: 59=
- Population density: 6.8/km^{2} (18/sq mi)

Eriska is a relatively flat tidal island at the entrance to Loch Creran on the west coast of Scotland.

Privately owned by the Buchanan-Smiths from 1973 until August 2016, Eriska is now owned by Creation Gem, a family-owned business from Hong Kong. The island is run as a hotel with wooded grounds. The island is evidently populated although no record for the total was provided by the census in 2001 or 2011. In 2022 the resident population was recorded by the census as 21.

== Geography ==
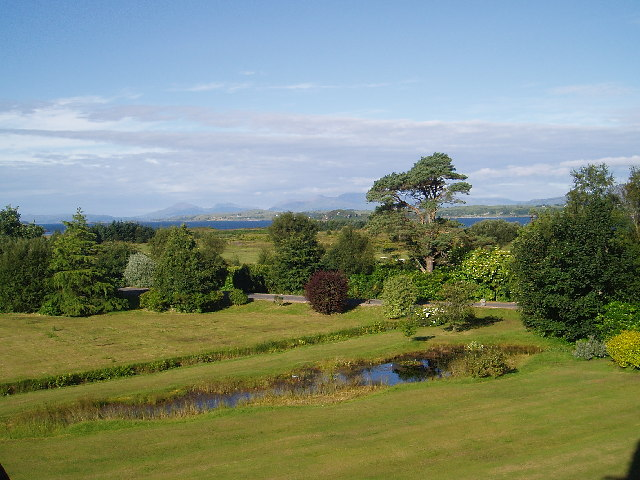
Eriska

The island is largely of schist and slate with the lower ground to the west as a raised beach. To the east of the bridge, there is a partly submerged crannog, or fortified dwelling, dating from the Bronze Age around 200 B.C. It is part of the Lynn of Lorn National Scenic Area, one of 40 in Scotland.

The estate as a whole includes about 20 hectares (49 acres) on the mainland with a Site of Special Scientific Interest. The island itself has been measured at 145 hectares (360 acres) in total.

== Eriska House ==
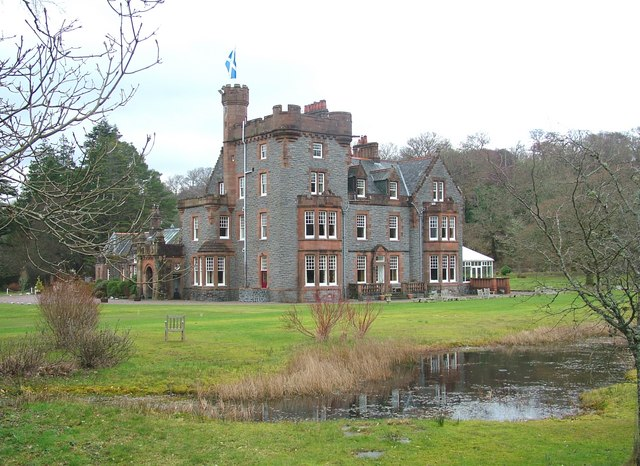
Isle of Eriska Hotel

Eriska House was built in 1884 by the Stewarts of Appin. It was built in the Scottish Baronial style by architect Hippolyte Blanc, who was highly acclaimed for his meticulous attention to detail and for a very high degree of specification in materials.

Eriska was occupied by the Blairs and Clark Hutchisons, who built the bridge over the drying channel, connecting the island to the mainland at all states of the tide. They left in 1930. Capt. A.D.S. Barr bought the island in 1945 and ran the house as a hotel from c. 1948 until 1957. After that little upkeep was done until the island was purchased by the Buchanan-Smith family in 1973. The house remains essentially the same with the surrounding buildings converted to become part of the hotel.

== Sculpture ==
Public sculptures near the shoreline include the carved stone horse by Ronald Rae and Otter by Kenneth Robertson at Otter Point overlooking Loch Linnhe.
