= José Maria Pedroto =

Portuguese footballer and coach (1928–1985)

Personal information
- Full name: José Maria Carvalho Pedroto
- Date of birth: 21 October 1928
- Place of birth: Almacave, Portugal
- Date of death: 7 January 1985 (aged 56)
- Place of death: Porto, Portugal
- Position: Midfielder

Youth career
- 1944–1945: Pedras Rubras
- 1945–1948: Leixões

Senior career*
Years	Team	Apps	(Gls)
1948–1950	Lusitano	25	(12)
1950–1952	Belenenses	50	(14)
1952–1960	Porto	152	(31)
Total		227	(57)

International career
1952–1957	Portugal	17	(0)

Managerial career
- 1962–1964: Académica
- 1964–1965: Leixões
- 1965–1966: Varzim
- 1966–1969: Porto
- 1969–1974: Vitória Setúbal
- 1974–1976: Boavista
- 1974–1976: Portugal
- 1976–1980: Porto
- 1980–1982: Vitória Guimarães
- 1982–1984: Porto
- * Club domestic league appearances and goals

José Maria Carvalho Pedroto, OIH (21 October 1928 – 7 January 1985) was a Portuguese football player and manager.

A midfielder, he amassed Primeira Liga totals of 227 matches and 57 goals over 11 seasons, playing for Lusitano, Belenenses and Porto.

After retiring, Pedroto embarked on a coaching career which lasted 22 years (always in the Portuguese top division), going on to become one of Porto's most successful managers.

== Playing career ==
=== Club ===
Born in the village of Almacave in Lamego, Viseu District, Pedroto began his senior career with Lusitano in Vila Real de Santo António, to where he had been relocated to perform his military service. In February 1950, he scored two of his 12 goals for the season in home wins against Porto (3–1) and Sporting CP (2–0), as the Primeira Liga title was eventually awarded to Benfica.

In 1950, the 21-year-old Pedroto signed with Lisbon-based Belenenses after being offered a position in the Navy Ministry. He joined Porto two years later, for 335.000 escudos.

Pedroto won the national championship twice during his spell at the Estádio das Antas, under Dorival Yustrich and Béla Guttmann. He retired at the age of 31, being immediately named his last club's junior coach.

=== International ===
Over five years, Pedroto won 17 caps for Portugal. He made his debut on 20 April 1952, in a 3–0 friendly loss to France.

== Coaching career ==
While still a player, at the age of 25, Pedroto took a coaching course given by the Cândido de Oliveira. Six years later, he became the first Portuguese coach with a specialisation taken at the French Football Federation. After starting his career with Porto juniors, he was appointed field coach for the Portugal under-18 team by manager David Sequerra as they won the 1961 UEFA European Championship, the country's first international title.

In 1962, Pedroto took charge of Académica de Coimbra. He then spent one season apiece with Leixões and Varzim, being dismissed by the former midway through 1964–65 which marked the only occasion in his career where he was relieved of his duties; subsequently, he returned to Porto as an assistant.

Over three top-tier campaigns, Pedroto led Porto to the third place twice and the second in 1968–69, winning the Taça de Portugal in 1968, He left, however, for Vitória de Setúbal, who would finish a best-ever league runners-up in 1971–72 and twice reach the quarter-finals of the Inter-Cities Fairs Cup while he was in charge, notably ousting Liverpool in the second round of the 1969–70 edition of the latter tournament.

Starting in 1974 and during two years, Pedroto coached both Boavista and the Portugal national team. He won the domestic cup always during his tenure at the former, also finishing in second position in the league in the 1975–76 season. With the latter, he did not manage to qualify for UEFA Euro 1976 in spite of only losing one match in Group 1.

Pedroto returned to Porto ahead of 1976–77, ending a 19-year drought the following campaign by winning the championship and repeating the feat the next season. He was, however, fired in the summer of 1980 after a run-in with president Américo de Sá. He arguably set the foundations for the club's European exploits in the mid-to-late 1980s.

For several decades, Pedroto was the manager with the most wins in the Portuguese top flight with 326. His sides excelled in ball possession and attacking football, and he was also one of the first managers to introduce a team physician; he was accused by fellow coach Mário Wilson of being a "master of conflict" and for having attitudes that "bordered on racism", with the pair being often involved in wars of words. His 322 games in charge of Porto remained a record until surpassed by Sérgio Conceição in 2023.

== Personal life and death ==
Pedroto was affectionately known as "Zé do Boné" (Cap Joe), due to his habit of wearing a flat tweed cap all the time. He was an avid fisher and reader, who also took an interest in the occult.

Pedroto died from cancer on 7 January 1985 in Porto at the age of 56.

== Honours ==
=== Player ===
Porto

- Primeira Liga: 1955–56, 1958–59
- Taça de Portugal: 1955–56, 1957–58

=== Manager ===
Boavista

- Taça de Portugal: 1974–75, 1975–76

Porto

- Primeira Liga: 1977–78, 1978–79
- Taça de Portugal: 1967–68, 1976–77, 1983–84
- Supertaça Cândido de Oliveira: 1983

Portugal

- UEFA European Under-18 Championship: 1961
