= Francisco Gonzales =

Francisco Gonzales may refer to:

- Francisco Gonzales (murderer) (1937-1964), Filipino murderer and former sailor
- Francisco Gonzales (footballer) (1947-2008), Peruvian footballer

== See also ==
- Francisco González (disambiguation)
