= Moncloa.com =

Spanish newspaper

- Type: Free weekly newspaper
- Owner: Merca2
- Publisher: Mercados y Estilos de Vida SL
- President: Alejandro Suárez Sánchez-Ocaña
- Editor: Alejandro Suárez Sánchez-Ocaña
- General manager: Joaquín Vidal
- Slogan: Política, poder, pasión
- Founded: September 17, 2016; 9 years ago
- Language: Spanish
- Headquarters: Paseo de la Castellana 173, 8th floor 28046, Madrid
- City: Madrid
- Country: Spain
- Price: Free
- Readership: 17,500 daily (2023); 957,062 monthly (2023)
- Sister newspapers: Qué!
- ISSN: 1558-7878
- OCLC number: 969907086
- Website: www.moncloa.com

Moncloa.com is a free weekly newspaper, published by Mercados y Estilos de Vida SL in Spain. Launched in 2016, the newspaper specializes in political news and is located in Madrid. It belongs to the Merca2 Group, which also includes other online media outlets such as Merca2.es, Qué! and Motor16.com.

== History ==
The newspaper was launched in 2016 by the Merca2 together with Bloomberg L.P.; Moncloa has an agreement with Bloomberg L.P. that gives its exclusive rights to distribute its content in Spain. The main purpose of Moncloa is to report on political topics, with particular emphasis on Spanish political parties. It presented itself as a "confidential news outlet that aims to expose political misdeeds".

Moncloa has been described as "a little sister of merca2.es", a business newspaper. In 2018, Moncloa "debuted" with revealing the recordings of Dolores Delgado, the Spanish Minister of Justice, insulting Fernando Grande-Marlaska, the Minister of the Interior, calling him a "faggot" and a "woman". Investigations into how a new newspaper could access such material showed that Moncloa, along with merca2.es has exclusive rights to Bloomberg's financial information in Spain.

In January 2019, in collaboration with other media outlets, Moncloa published a series of documents showing that the Banco Bilbao Vizcaya Argentaria (BBVA), chaired by the banker Francisco González, hired the businessman José Manuel Villarejo to provide information on the plans of the government of José Luis Rodríguez Zapatero to seize the control of BBVA's board of directors. This agreement was allegedly dubbed Operation Trap (Spanish: Operación Trampa).

Later, Moncloa also published information on Villarejo's cooperation with the BBVA's head of security Julio Corrochano Peña, to wiretap up to 4,000 phone numbers, with 15,000 calls intercepted. Following this publication, Spanish courts opened an investigation into the spying scheme, which targeted politicians, journalists and the financiers. Moncloa also reported that Francisco González also "directly managed a multimillion-dollar fund for aid to the press, unrelated to its audience and unconnected to official advertising campaigns." In response to the revelations, the Spanish government started an investigation into the scheme, and the judge Manuel García-Castellón ordered Spanish police to enter the office of Moncloa and El Confidencial to hand over all material related to Villarejo and BBVA.

In September 2019, the newspaper also published audio recording from a luncheon held on 23 October 2009, where Villarejo, Dolores Delgado and judge Baltasar Garzón were seated. In the recording, Delgado stated that several Spanish judges and prosecutors had been with underage girls on a trip to Colombia. As Villarejo was responsible for the recordings, Moncloa was accused of being "a tool of Villarejo", but the newspaper stated claimed to have no connections to the businessman. However, the Spanish radio station Cadena SER revealed that the administrator of Moncloa's publisher Mercados y Estilos de Vida SL, Suárez Sánchez-Ocaña, is a partner of a businessman Antonio Codías Berrocal, who had conducted "substantial business dealings" with Villarejo.

The director of Moncloa, Alejandro Suárez Sánchez-Ocaña, wrote a Q&A in response to the controversy caused by the leaks. Sánchez-Ocaña wrote that while Moncloa does not have access to the entire archive of Villarejo, it is certain that it contains "tens of thousands of files, some of which are audio and hours and hours long" and "more than a decade of recordings, images, dossiers, and press clippings". However, Sánchez-Ocaña refused to reveal where the newspaper obtained the documents from. In an interview with LaSexta, he acknowledged Moncloa's extensive ties to Merca2 and Qué!, but denied that the newspaper has any ties to Villarejo, describing the claims as "absolutely false" and stating that Moncloa has "nothing to do with Villarejo".

By a court order, the newspaper was ordered to hand over the audio recordings and reveal all information related to José Villarejo. Spanish courts opened an investigation into the accusations revealed by the audio recordings, as well as to investigate "a relationship between Villarejo or other people investigated in the case and the digital leak of this recording." In November 2019, the National High Court of Spain prohibited Moncloa from publishing further news related to the recordings.

== Editions ==
The paper is based in and distributes to Madrid. However, it also has a localized edition for Catalonia.
