= 1974–75 Primeira Divisão =

41st season of top-tier Portuguese football

Primeira Liga
- Season: 1974–75
- Champions: Benfica; 21st title
- Matches: 240
- Goals: 703 (2.93 per match)

The 1974–75 Primeira Divisão was the 41st season of top-tier football in Portugal.

== Overview ==
It was contested by 16 teams, and S.L. Benfica won the championship.

== League standings ==
Pos	Team	Pld	W	D	L	GF	GA	GD	Pts	Qualification or relegation
1	Benfica (C)	30	21	7	2	62	12	+50	49	Qualification to European Cup first round
2	Porto	30	19	6	5	62	30	+32	44	Qualification to UEFA Cup first round
3	Sporting CP	30	17	9	4	59	25	+34	43	Qualification to UEFA Cup first round
4	Boavista	30	16	6	8	58	32	+26	38	Qualification to Cup Winners' Cup first round
5	Vitória de Guimarães	30	16	6	8	64	36	+28	38	Qualification to UEFA Cup first round
6	Belenenses	30	14	7	9	45	37	+8	35	
7	Vitória de Setúbal	30	11	7	12	48	36	+12	29	
8	CUF Barreiro	30	10	9	11	41	41	0	29	
9	Leixões	30	10	9	11	29	42	−13	29	
10	Atlético	30	10	6	14	38	69	−31	26	
11	Farense	30	11	3	16	38	52	−14	25	
12	União de Tomar	30	9	5	16	39	59	−20	23	
13	Académica	30	7	6	17	33	47	−14	20	
14	Oriental (R)	30	5	10	15	21	51	−30	20	Relegation to Segunda Divisão
15	Olhanense (R)	30	6	5	19	41	70	−29	17	Relegation to Segunda Divisão
16	Espinho (R)	30	4	7	19	25	64	−39	15	Relegation to Segunda Divisão

Source: RSSSF
Rules for classification: 1) points; 2) goal difference; 3) number of goals scored.
(C) Champions; (R) Relegated

== Results ==
Home \ Away	ACA	ACP	BEL	BEN	BOA	CUF	ESP	FAR	LEI	OLH	ORI	POR	SCP	UTO	VGU	VSE
Académica		0–0	2–1	0–0	1–2	1–2	2–1	2–0	0–1	3–1	0–1	1–2	1–3	3–1	3–3	1–2
Atlético CP	1–0		0–1	0–3	0–1	3–1	2–1	2–1	1–1	1–0	0–0	1–2	1–3	2–1	1–4	2–1
Belenenses	1–3	0–1		1–2	2–1	1–1	2–1	1–0	0–0	6–4	3–0	2–2	2–0	1–0	2–1	3–3
Benfica	4–0	3–0	4–0		5–1	1–0	2–0	4–0	3–0	2–2	4–0	0–1	1–1	3–1	3–0	2–0
Boavista	1–0	6–3	2–1	0–0		6–1	0–0	1–1	4–0	2–1	3–0	1–2	2–0	6–1	3–0	1–0
CUF Barreiro	0–0	2–2	1–3	0–1	1–1		4–0	1–0	1–0	7–2	3–0	2–1	2–2	1–1	2–1	0–2
Espinho	1–1	2–3	1–1	1–2	1–6	2–2		1–0	2–0	2–2	1–3	0–2	0–1	2–1	2–3	1–0
Farense	3–0	4–1	1–3	0–4	1–0	1–0	5–0		2–1	2–1	1–0	1–6	1–2	5–2	2–5	0–1
Leixões	2–1	1–1	2–0	1–2	0–0	2–0	1–0	3–0		1–0	2–1	0–1	1–1	0–1	0–3	2–0
Olhanense	3–1	3–5	1–2	0–1	3–1	1–2	2–1	1–1	0–1		2–0	1–2	1–0	1–1	2–3	1–1
Oriental	2–2	2–0	1–1	0–0	0–0	1–1	0–0	1–1	3–3	1–0		1–2	0–0	2–3	2–0	0–1
Porto	2–0	5–0	0–4	0–3	2–1	2–1	4–0	2–0	1–1	4–1	4–0		1–1	3–0	1–1	1–1
Sporting CP	1–0	6–1	1–0	1–1	1–0	1–1	5–1	3–0	5–2	7–0	3–0	2–1		3–0	2–3	1–0
União de Tomar	1–4	5–2	0–1	0–0	1–2	1–0	3–1	0–3	1–1	4–2	3–0	1–5	1–2		3–2	1–0
Vitória de Guimarães	3–1	2–2	2–0	0–1	1–2	1–0	5–0	3–0	0–0	4–0	5–0	2–0	0–0	0–0		3–2
Vitória de Setúbal	2–0	8–0	0–0	2–1	3–2	1–2	0–0	1–2	8–0	2–3	3–0	1–1	1–1	2–1	0–4	

Legend: Blue = home team win; Yellow = draw; Red = away team win.

== Season statistics ==
=== Top goalscorers ===
Rank	Player	Club	Goals
1	(Argentina) Héctor Yazalde	Sporting	30
2	(Brazil) Jeremias	Vitória de Guimarães	18
3	(Portugal) Tito	Vitória de Guimarães	17
4	(Portugal) Fernando Gomes	Porto	14
4	(Brazil) Salvador	Boavista	14
6	(Portugal) António Lemos	Porto	13
6	(Portugal) Moinhos	Benfica	13
8	(Portugal) António Oliveira	Porto	12
8	(Portugal) João Alves	Boavista	12
10	(Portugal) Nené	Benfica	11
10	(Paraguay) Francisco González	Belenenses	11
