= Rui Casaca =

Portuguese football director and former player (born 1959)

Personal information
- Full name: Rui Manuel Magalhães Casaca
- Date of birth: 18 October 1959 (age 67)
- Place of birth: Marco de Canaveses, Portugal
- Height: 1.79 m (5 ft 10 in)
- Position: Midfielder

Youth career
- 1973–1979: Braga

Senior career*
Years	Team	Apps	(Gls)
1979–1980	Merelinense		
1980–1982	Valdevez	21	(6)
1982–1984	Rio Ave	56	(5)
1984–1994	Boavista	249	(13)
Total		326	(24)

Managerial career
- 1994–1997: Boavista (assistant)
- 1997: Boavista (interim)
- 2002–2003: Belenenses (assistant)
- * Club domestic league appearances and goals

Rui Manuel Magalhães Casaca (born 18 October 1959) is a Portuguese former professional footballer who played as a central midfielder, and is the director of football at S.C. Braga.

== Football career ==
Born in Marco de Canaveses, Porto District, Casaca started playing in the lower leagues with Merelinense F.C. and C.A. Valdevez, helping the latter team promote to the Segunda Liga in 1981. Starting in the following year and until his retirement, he competed solely in the Primeira Liga, with Rio Ave F.C. and Boavista FC.

In the 1985–86 season, Casaca scored a career-best four goals from 28 appearances to help Boavista finish in fifth position, with the subsequent qualification to the UEFA Cup. He retired in June 1994 at the age of 34, amassing top division totals of 305 matches and 18 goals, and immediately joined his main club's coaching staff; in January 1997 he was named interim manager, collecting one point in his two games in charge.

From 1997 to 2006, Casaca acted as director of football of Boavista and C.F. Os Belenenses, also being assistant to manager Manuel José at both sides. On 31 July 2007, in the same capacity, he returned to S.C. Braga where he had already occupied the position, and went on to remain there for several years.

== Honours ==
=== Player ===
Boavista

- Taça de Portugal: 1991–92
- Supertaça Cândido de Oliveira: 1992
