= Manolo Lama =

Spanish radio sportscaster (born 1962)

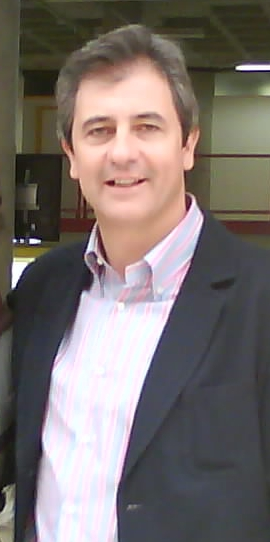
Manolo Lama

Manolo Lama (born 3 January 1962 in Madrid, Spain) is a Spanish radio sportscaster. Lama is known for his play-by-play covers of Real Madrid, Atlético Madrid and Spain matches on the radio program Tiempo de Juego on Cadena COPE from 1982 until 2011 in the Cadena Ser.

Lama has also covered important events such as the Olympic Games and the FIFA World Cup. On Cadena COPE he presents the program Deportes COPE and collaborates on the show El Partidazo de COPE. On television, he presented the afternoon sports bulletin on Cuatro. Lama is also the Spanish play-by-play announcer (alongside Paco González) of EA Sports' FIFA series video games since 1998.

In 2023, after Luis Rubiales caused controversy when he kissed Spanish midfielder Jennifer Hermoso on the lips without her permission, Lama said on the radio, "Those who are angry, it's because they have never been kissed". After pushback, Lama said he was sorry to "those I have offended", and added, "Spain has become a country of inquisitors ... if you think differently, you'll be stoned".
