= Casoto =

Portuguese footballer (1906–1955)

Fernando Casoto
Personal information
- Full name: Manuel de Sousa
- Date of birth: 1906
- Place of birth: Portugal
- Date of death: 1955 (aged 48–49)
- Position: Goalkeeper

Senior career*
| Years | Team | Apps | (Gls) |
- Boavista

International career
| 1926 | Portugal | 1 | (0) |
- * Club domestic league appearances and goals

Manuel de Sousa known as Casoto, was a Portuguese footballer who played as a goalkeeper.
