= Qué! =

Spanish Newspaper

- Type: Free weekly newspaper
- Format: Tabloid
- Owner(s): Grupo Vocento
- Publisher: Factoría de Información
- Editor-in-chief: Pedro Biurrun
- Associate editor: Raúl Lucas and Antonio Olivié
- Founded: 2005
- Language: Spanish
- Headquarters: 6 Carrer Juan Antonio Luca de Tena, 28027, Madrid
- Circulation: 978,786 (2005)
- Price: Free
- Website: www.que.es

Qué! is a free weekly newspaper, published by Factoría de Información in Spain. Following the 2008 financial crisis, the newspaper decreased its circulation from being daily and distributed throughout the whole country, to being available only Fridays in Madrid. It belongs to the Merca2 Group, which also includes other online media outlets such as Merca2.es, Moncloa.com and Motor16.com.

== History ==
Qué! was first published in 2005 and in just two years became a free daily newspaper with the second highest readership (ahead of ADN and Metro), with a 26% share of the advertising market. It has a workforce of 240 people and is, according to a survey by Ipsos Media on the free press, the best rated free daily. On 1 August 2007, Qué! joined Grupo Vocento reinforcing its position as a popular Spanish newspaper.

== Editions ==
The paper is based in and distributes to Madrid. Localised editions of the paper are also available in:

- Aragón
- Barcelona
- Bilbao
- Castellón
- La Rioja
- Málaga
- Oviedo
- Seville
- Valencia
