= Motor16 =

Spanish automotive magazine

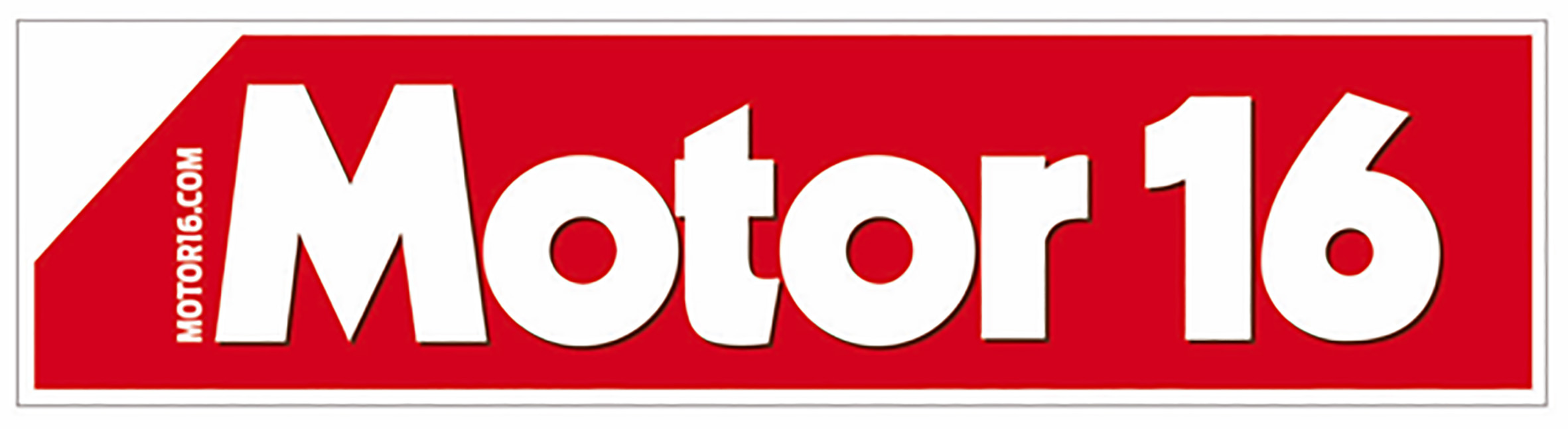
- Editor-in-chief: Juan Tomás de Salas (founder); Félix Lázaro; Ángel Carchenilla; Javier Montoya
- Former editors: Tomás Cavanna; Alberto Mallo; Manuel Domenech
- Categories: Automotive magazine
- Frequency: Monthly
- Publisher: Motor16, S.L.
- First issue: October 1983
- Company: Grupo Merca2
- Country: Spain
- Based in: Madrid
- Language: Spanish
- Website: motor16.com
- ISSN: 1575-958X

Motor16 is a Spanish magazine specializing in the automotive sector. It was founded in October 1983 as part of Grupo 16, which also published Cambio16, Diario16, and Historia16. Its original aim was to bring to automotive journalism the same informative and analytical approach that characterized Cambio16 during Spain’s Transition period. It belongs to the Merca2 Group, which also includes other online media outlets such as Merca2.es, Moncloa.com and Qué!.

== History ==
From 1983 to 1998, the magazine was part of Grupo 16. After the group’s bankruptcy in April 1998, the magazine was acquired by Legal Informatic S.L., controlled by the Lerner family (printers of the publication), with a minority stake held by employees.

In May 2006, Grupo Vocento purchased Legal Informatic S.L. and incorporated Motor16 into its subsidiary Taller de Editores Motor S.A. In late 2008, six employees and external investors acquired the title from Vocento, forming Grupo de Comunicación Sexta Marcha S.L.L.

In January 2022, Grupo Merca2 acquired 100% of Motor16, integrating it into its media portfolio alongside Merca2, Moncloa.com, and ¡Qué!. At that time, Alejandro Suárez Sánchez-Ocaña was appointed president, Javier Montoya became director, and Ángel Carchenilla the editor-in-chief.

== Content ==
Since its inception, Motor16 has emphasized technical testing. It has used facilities such as the closed circuit at INTA (National Institute of Aerospace Technology) to measure vehicle fuel consumption and performance using advanced instrumentation.

The magazine was among the first in Europe to perform long-term reliability testing of new vehicles, dismantling them afterwards to analyze component wear. In 1983, in its second issue, Motor16 examined an Opel Corsa after 15,000 km. Later it extended tests to 25,000 km and 50,000 km, and in 1998 reached 100,000 km with an Audi A3, becoming the first European magazine to perform such a long test.

It also pioneered the use of helicopters in Spain for rally coverage. Among its most notable journalistic works is the reconstruction of the accident of Alfonso de Borbón, Duke of Cádiz.

Motor16 also organized, together with Cambio16, a trip through the Alcarria region with writer Camilo José Cela, in a Rolls-Royce with chauffeur; that experience inspired Cela’s book Segundo viaje a la Alcarria.

== Present day ==
Motor16 is currently published monthly. Its content focuses on product information (new releases, in-depth tests, comparisons, limited edition series), interviews, motorsport, and general interest topics related to automobiles.

== Awards ==
The magazine annually organizes the Motor16 Awards, recognizing notable brands and executives in the automotive sector. In 2024, the awards gala – titled Los Mejores 2024 – was held in Madrid.
