= Álvaro Carolino =

Portuguese footballer and manager

Personal information
- Full name: Álvaro Carolino Nascimento
- Date of birth: 7 April 1951
- Place of birth: Palmela, Portugal
- Date of death: 10 August 2001 (aged 50)
- Place of death: Portugal
- Position: Centre back

Youth career
- 1964–1965: Pinhalnovense
- 1965–1969: Benfica

Senior career*
Years	Team	Apps	(Gls)
1969–1972	Peniche		
1972–1974	Montijo	50	(1)
1974–1981	Boavista	94	(0)
1981	Académica	5	(0)

International career
1968–1969	Portugal U18	3	(0)
1975–1977	Portugal	2	(0)

Managerial career
- 1982: Boavista
- 1982–1984: Espinho
- 1984–1985: Chaves
- 1985–1987: Nacional
- 1987–1988: Olhanense
- 1988–1989: Felgueiras
- 1989–1990: Académico Viseu
- 1990–1991: Feirense
- 1992: Campomaiorense
- 1992–1993: Varzim
- 1993–1995: Maia
- 1995: Leixões
- 1995–1996: Beira-Mar
- 1996–1997: Esposende
- 1998–1999: Marco
- * Club domestic league appearances and goals

Álvaro Carolino Nascimento (7 April 1951 – 10 August 2001), known as Carolino, was a Portuguese football central defender and manager.

== Playing career ==
Born in Palmela, Setúbal District, Carolino amassed Primeira Liga totals of 149 games and one goal during eight seasons, with C.D. Montijo, Boavista F.C. and Académica de Coimbra. His best output in the competition occurred in 1975–76, when he only missed one match to help the second club finish in second position, two points behind champions S.L. Benfica.

Carolino earned two caps for Portugal, his debut coming on 19 November 1975 as he came on as a 48th-minute substitute in a 1–1 home draw against England for the UEFA Euro 1976 qualifiers.

== Coaching career ==
Carolino worked as a manager for nearly 20 years. In the top flight, he worked with Boavista, S.C. Espinho and Académico de Viseu FC.

== Death ==
Carolino died on 10 August 2001 at the age of 50, due to pulmonary complications. Later that day, Boavista paid tribute to him by observing a one-minute silence at the Estádio do Bessa in a match against S.C. Beira-Mar.

== Honours ==
- Taça de Portugal: 1974–75, 1975–76, 1978–79
- Supertaça Cândido de Oliveira: 1979
