= Salvador Almeida =

Brazilian footballer (1949–2014)

Salvador
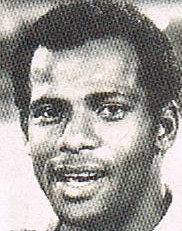
- Salvador in 1971

Personal information
- Full name: Salvador Luiz de Almeida
- Date of birth: 16 January 1949
- Place of birth: Campos dos Goytacazes, Rio de Janeiro, Brazil
- Date of death: 3 November 2014 (aged 65)
- Place of death: Rio de Janeiro, Rio de Janeiro, Brazil
- Position: Forward

Youth career
- 1968–1969: Fluminense

Senior career*
| Years | Team | Apps | (Gls) |
| 1970–1971 | Olaria | | |
| 1971 | Atlético Mineiro | 7 | (0) |
| 1972–1980 | Boavista | | |
| 1980–1981 | Sporting CP | | |
| 1981–1983 | Sporting Espinho | | |
| 1983–1986 | Felgueiras | | |
- * Club domestic league appearances and goals

Salvador Luiz de Almeida (16 January 1949 – 3 November 2014), commonly known as either Salvador Almeida or simply Salvador was a Brazilian footballer. Playing as a forward, he was most known for his career with Brazilian club Atlético Mineiro and Portuguese club Boavista throughout the 1980s.

== Club career ==
He would begin his career within the youth ranks of Fluminense from 1968 and 1969. He would then have his senior debut with Olaria in 1970 and would continue for the majority of the 1971 season. He was then transferred to briefly play for Atlético Mineiro where he wouldn't have a good time with only seven games played as a reserve despite later being part of the winning squad for the 1971 Campeonato Brasileiro Série A.

Salvador would find larger success upon traveling abroad to Portugal to play for Boavista for the 1972–73 Primeira Divisão. Over the course of his career with the club, he would enjoy consistent participation as a part of the starting XI as he would win the 1975, the 1976 and the 1979 editions of the Taça de Portugal under English manager Jimmy Hagan. At the age of 30, he would sign with Sporting CP for the 1980–81 season alongside fellow Brazilian compatriot Manoel Costa as he would play in 17 games after being briefly in the starting XI for the club. He would then spend his final seasons with Sporting Espinho and Felgueiras as he was a part of the squad that would be promoted for the 1984–85 II Divisão before retiring by 1986.

== Later life ==
He would return to Brazil to work as a merchant within the Rio de Janeiro area. He died on 3 November 2014 at the age of 65.
