= Óscar Carvalho =

Portuguese footballer

Óscar de Carvalho
Personal information
- Full name: Óscar Maia Vasques de Carvalho
- Date of birth: 22 December 1903
- Place of birth: Porto, Portugal
- Date of death: Unknown
- Position: Defender

Senior career*
Years	Team	Apps	(Gls)
1927?–36	Boavista		
1936–38	Leixões		
- * Club domestic league appearances and goals

Óscar Maia Vasques de Carvalho (born 22 December 1903, date of death unknown) was a Portuguese footballer who played for Boavista and Leixões, as a defender.

== International career ==
Although Carvalho never played a single game for the national team, he was called for the 1928 Football Olympic Tournament whilst playing for Boavista.
