= Manuel Barbosa =

Portuguese footballer (born 1951)

Personal information
- Full name: Manuel José Ferreira da Silva Barbosa
- Date of birth: 26 February 1951 (age 75)
- Height: 1.78 m (5 ft 10 in)
- Position: Midfielder

Senior career*
Years	Team	Apps	(Gls)
1969–1983	Boavista	344	(6)

International career
	Portugal U18	6	(0)
	Portugal U18	2	(0)

Managerial career
- 1983: Boavista
- 1984–1985: Penafiel
- 1988: Boavista (caretaker)
- 1989–1990: Boavista
- 1990: Chaves
- 1991–1992: Leixões
- 1993: UD Oliveirense
- 1993–1994: Académico de Viseu
- 1994–1995: Desportivo das Aves
- 2011: Shandong Luneng Taishan (caretaker)
- * Club domestic league appearances and goals

Manuel José Ferreira da Silva Barbosa (born 26 February 1951) is a Portuguese football manager and a former player.

He played 14 seasons and 344 games in the Primeira Liga, all for Boavista. He is the most capped player in the history of Boavista.

He also played for Portugal U18 and U21.

== Honours ==
- Taça de Portugal: 1975, 1976, 1979
- Supertaça Cândido de Oliveira: 1979.
