= Celso de Matos =

Portuguese footballer (born 1947)

Celso
Personal information
- Full name: Celso Luís de Matos
- Date of birth: 1 August 1947 (age 79)
- Place of birth: Rio de Janeiro, Brazil
- Position: Midfielder

Senior career*
Years	Team	Apps	(Gls)
1969–1972	Boavista	77	(3)
1972–1974	Porto	32	(2)
1974–1976	Boavista	42	(0)
1976–1978	Porto	35	(0)
1978–1979	Boavista	1	(0)
1980	Goiás		

International career
1976–1978	Portugal	3	(0)
- * Club domestic league appearances and goals

Celso Luís de Matos (born 1 August 1947) is a former Portuguese footballer who played as midfielder.
