= Panteras Negras F.C. =

- Full name: Panteras Negras Footballers Club
- Founded: 21 July 2025; 11 months ago
- Ground: Complexo Desportivo de Ramalde
- President: Nuno Fonseca
- Manager: Rolando Pereira
- League: Porto FA 1st Division
- 2025–26: Porto FA 2nd Division; Série 5, 1st (promoted); Promotion series, 5th

Panteras Negras Footballers Club is a Portuguese football club from Porto. The club was established in 2025 by supporters of Boavista, and entered in the fourth tier of the Porto Football Association.

== History ==
Boavista F.C. was relegated from the top-flight Primeira Liga in 2024–25. Due to financial issues, the club was refused entry in the Liga Portugal 2 or Liga 3. On 21 July 2025, Boavista fans, including the Panteras Negras (Black Panthers) group, established Panteras Negras Footballers Club; "Footballers Club" was part of the original name of Boavista. The club joined the Porto Football Association. Supporters' group leader Nuno Fonseca was named president and Milton Ribeiro, who had won promotion to the Campeonato de Portugal in 2019 with CF Canelas 2010, was named as manager.

Part of the reason to create the new team was disagreement with the Boavista board's decision to enter a senior football team in the Porto FA's competitions, in addition to the team belonging to the club's Sociedade Anónima Desportiva (SAD) competing in the Liga Pro, the local association's highest league. Panteras Negras set a target to reach the Campeonato de Portugal in four years' time.

With its home ground being in the parish of Ramalde, 2.5 kilometres from Boavista's Estádio do Bessa, Panteras Negras was assigned to the fourth tier of the Porto FA's leagues for 2025–26. On 5 October, the game between Boavista and Panteras Negras was cancelled due to Boavista not turning up, resulting in a 3–0 win; by the end of the month, Boavista withdrew, having never turned up to a match.

On 12 April 2026, Panteras Negras won promotion to the third division of the Porto FA's district leagues, with a 3–1 win over Ventura. The club announced plans for an academy and teams in handball, futsal and padel. It also announced its intentions of securing the stadium, museum and logo rights of Boavista.
