= Francisco J. Gonzalez =

Spanish philosopher (born 1963)

- Born: June 17, 1963 (age 63)

Academic background
- Education: University of Toronto (PhD)
- Thesis: The Tension Between the Means and End of Philosophical Inquiry: Dialectic in Plato's Early and Middle Dialogues (1991)

Academic work
- Era: Contemporary philosophy
- Region: Western philosophy
- School or tradition: Ancient Greek philosophy
- Institutions: University of Ottawa
- Main interests: Continental philosophy, Hermeneutics, Ancient Greek philosophy, Heidegger, Plato, Aristotle
- Website: https://uniweb.uottawa.ca/view/profile/members/498

Francisco Jose Gonzalez (born June 17, 1963) is a Spanish philosopher and professor at the University of Ottawa.

== Publications ==
=== Monographs ===
- Gonzalez, Francisco J. (2024). Human Life in Motion: Heidegger's Unpublished Seminars on Aristotle as Preserved by Helene Weiss. Indiana University Press. doi:10.2307/jj.8441693. ISBN 978-0-253-06830-9.
- Gonzalez, Francisco J. (2009). Plato and Heidegger: A Question of Dialogue. Penn State University Press. doi:10.5325/j.ctv14gpdxm. ISBN 978-0-271-03558-1. JSTOR 10.5325/j.ctv14gpdxm.
- Gonzalez, Francisco J. (1998). Dialectic and Dialogue : Plato's Practice of Philosophical Inquiry. Internet Archive. Evanston, Ill. : Northwestern University Press. ISBN 978-0-8101-1529-3.

==== Editions ====
- Collobert, Catherine; Destrée, Pierre; Gonzalez, Francisco J., eds. (2012). Plato and Myth: Studies on the Use and Status of Platonic Myths. doi:10.1163/9789004224360. ISBN 978-90-04-22436-0.
- Gonzalez, Francisco J., ed. (1995). The Third Way: New Directions in Platonic Studies. Bloomsbury Publishing PLC. ISBN 978-0-8476-8114-3.
