= Eliseu (footballer, born 1952) =

Portuguese footballer

Personal information
- Full name: Eliseu Martins Ramalho
- Date of birth: April 10, 1952 (age 74)
- Place of birth: Leça da Palmeira, Portugal
- Position: Midfielder

Senior career*
Years	Team	Apps	(Gls)
1967–1968	Leça		
1970–1976	Leixões	117	(4)
1976–1978	Varzim	53	(4)
1978–1983	Boavista	123	(5)

International career
1981–1982	Portugal	6	(0)
- * Club domestic league appearances and goals

Eliseu Martins Ramalho (born 10 April 1952 in Leça da Palmeira, Matosinhos), simply Eliseu, is a retired Portuguese footballer who played as a midfielder.
