= Diamantino Silva =

Portuguese footballer (born 1928)

Personal information
- Full name: Diamantino Pereira da Silva
- Date of birth: 29 March 1928
- Place of birth: Portugal
- Position: Forward

Senior career*
Years	Team	Apps	(Gls)
1952–1954	Belenenses		

International career
1953	Portugal	1	(0)
- * Club domestic league appearances and goals

Diamantino Pereira da Silva (born 29 March 1928) is a Portuguese former footballer who played as forward.

== Football career ==
Silva gained 1 cap for Portugal against South Africa 21 November 1953 in Lisbon, in a 3-1 victory.
