= Kenneth Robertson =

British sculptor

Kenneth Robertson (born 1931) is a British sculptor, known for his public work inspired by animals and the human form engaged in dance.As a former dental surgeon working in London with a broad understanding of anatomy, his first sculptures were influenced by red deer he then farmed in rural Hampshire. In 1997 he began a series of dancers, working in wax to capture movement and mood as expressed by the actions of dancers both contemporary and in classical ballet. He has collaborated with professional dancers and choreographers such as Russell Maliphant and his researches into the language of dance have referenced dance movement analysis authority Ann Hutchinson Guest and dance historian Ivor Forbes Guest.

== Public works ==
- statue of Jimmy Hagan, Sheffield United Football Club
- Pygmy hippo and calf, Marwell Zoo, Hampshire
- Pygmy hippo and calf, Longleat, Wiltshire
- Red deer calves playing, Durrell Wildlife Conservation Trust Jersey Zoo
- Pygmy Hippo and Calf, Summerleaze, Maidenhead
- Otter at Otter Point overlooking Loch Linnhe, The Isle of Eriska
