= 1977–78 Primeira Divisão =

44th season of top-tier Portuguese football

Primeira Liga
- Season: 1977-78
- Champions: F.C. Porto; 6th title
- Relegated: Portimonense; Espinho; Riopele; Feirense
- European Cup: F.C. Porto
- Cup Winners' Cup: Sporting CP
- UEFA Cup: Benfica; Braga
- Matches: 240
- Goals: 585 (2.44 per match)
- Top goalscorer: Fernando Gomes (25 goals)

Statistics of Portuguese Liga in the 1977–78 season.

== Overview ==
It was contested by 16 teams, and F.C. Porto won the championship. This year was notable for the fact that S.L. Benfica came second despite never losing a match throughout the entire season.

== League standings ==
| Pos | Team | Pld | W | D | L | GF | GA | GD | Pts | Qualification or relegation |
|---|---|---|---|---|---|---|---|---|---|---|
| 1 | Porto (C) | 30 | 22 | 7 | 1 | 81 | 21 | +60 | 51 | Qualification to European Cup first round |
| 2 | Benfica | 30 | 21 | 9 | 0 | 56 | 11 | +45 | 51 | Qualification to UEFA Cup first round |
| 3 | Sporting CP | 30 | 19 | 4 | 7 | 63 | 30 | +33 | 42 | Qualification to Cup Winners' Cup first round (Note: Sporting qualified for the Cup Winners' Cup as winners of the 1978 Taça de Portugal Final.) |
| 4 | Braga | 30 | 16 | 6 | 8 | 42 | 27 | +15 | 38 | Qualification to UEFA Cup first round |
| 5 | Belenenses | 30 | 14 | 8 | 8 | 25 | 21 | +4 | 36 | |
| 6 | Vitória de Guimarães | 30 | 12 | 7 | 11 | 33 | 28 | +5 | 31 | |
| 7 | Boavista | 30 | 10 | 8 | 12 | 36 | 38 | −2 | 28 | |
| 8 | Académica | 30 | 11 | 4 | 15 | 41 | 49 | −8 | 26 | |
| 9 | Vitória de Setúbal | 30 | 8 | 10 | 12 | 29 | 40 | −11 | 26 | |
| 10 | Varzim | 30 | 9 | 7 | 14 | 26 | 38 | −12 | 25 | |
| 11 | Estoril | 30 | 8 | 9 | 13 | 25 | 36 | −11 | 25 | |
| 12 | Marítimo | 30 | 8 | 7 | 15 | 22 | 45 | −23 | 23 | |
| 13 | Portimonense (R) | 30 | 8 | 7 | 15 | 29 | 39 | −10 | 23 | Relegation to Segunda Divisão |
| 14 | Espinho (R) | 30 | 8 | 6 | 16 | 30 | 52 | −22 | 22 | Relegation to Segunda Divisão |
| 15 | Riopele (R) | 30 | 6 | 9 | 15 | 23 | 51 | −28 | 21 | Relegation to Segunda Divisão |
| 16 | Feirense (R) | 30 | 5 | 2 | 23 | 24 | 59 | −35 | 12 | Relegation to Segunda Divisão |

Source: RSSSF
Rules for classification: 1) points; 2) goal difference; 3) number of goals scored.
(C) Champions; (R) Relegated

== Results ==
| Home \ Away | ACA | BEL | BEN | BOA | BRA | ESP | EST | FEI | MAR | PTM | POR | RPL | SCP | VAR | VGU | VSE |
|---|---|---|---|---|---|---|---|---|---|---|---|---|---|---|---|---|
| Académica | | 0–0 | 0–3 | 3–2 | 0–1 | 2–0 | 1–0 | 3–1 | 4–1 | 3–1 | 0–0 | 3–1 | 1–5 | 3–1 | 1–3 | 4–2 |
| Belenenses | 2–0 | | 0–0 | 1–0 | 0–1 | 1–1 | 0–0 | 2–0 | 3–0 | 2–0 | 0–0 | 1–0 | 0–1 | 1–0 | 1–0 | 1–0 |
| Benfica | 3–1 | 2–0 | | 2–0 | 0–0 | 2–0 | 2–1 | 2–0 | 6–0 | 1–1 | 0–0 | 3–0 | 1–0 | 2–1 | 2–0 | 3–2 |
| Boavista | 1–1 | 1–2 | 1–1 | | 0–2 | 1–1 | 5–1 | 2–1 | 2–1 | 2–1 | 0–2 | 4–1 | 3–1 | 0–2 | 0–0 | 0–0 |
| Braga | 2–0 | 2–0 | 0–0 | 2–1 | | 2–1 | 1–2 | 2–1 | 6–1 | 2–0 | 1–2 | 0–0 | 2–0 | 2–0 | 1–0 | 5–0 |
| Espinho | 4–1 | 1–2 | 1–5 | 0–1 | 1–0 | | 0–2 | 1–0 | 3–2 | 2–1 | 2–2 | 2–1 | 0–2 | 1–0 | 2–1 | 1–1 |
| Estoril | 2–0 | 1–2 | 0–3 | 0–1 | 1–0 | 2–0 | | 2–1 | 0–0 | 0–0 | 2–0 | 0–0 | 1–2 | 0–1 | 1–0 | 0–0 |
| Feirense | 0–4 | 0–0 | 0–1 | 1–4 | 0–1 | 3–0 | 1–1 | | 1–0 | 0–1 | 1–3 | 4–0 | 0–2 | 2–0 | 0–1 | 2–0 |
| Marítimo | 2–0 | 0–1 | 0–1 | 2–0 | 0–1 | 1–0 | 1–1 | 3–0 | | 1–0 | 1–3 | 1–0 | 0–4 | 2–0 | 1–1 | 0–0 |
| Portimonense | 1–0 | 0–2 | 0–3 | 1–2 | 3–2 | 2–0 | 1–1 | 5–1 | 0–0 | | 0–0 | 2–1 | 3–2 | 1–0 | 1–2 | 1–1 |
| Porto | 4–2 | 6–0 | 1–1 | 0–0 | 4–0 | 4–0 | 5–2 | 6–1 | 3–0 | 3–2 | | 6–0 | 3–0 | 5–1 | 2–1 | 3–0 |
| Riopele | 2–0 | 1–0 | 1–4 | 0–0 | 1–1 | 3–3 | 1–0 | 2–1 | 0–0 | 0–0 | 0–2 | | 2–4 | 0–0 | 1–2 | 2–1 |
| Sporting CP | 2–1 | 3–1 | 1–1 | 2–0 | 5–0 | 3–1 | 4–1 | 5–0 | 3–0 | 1–0 | 2–3 | 2–1 | | 0–0 | 2–2 | 1–0 |
| Varzim | 1–0 | 0–0 | 0–0 | 3–1 | 1–1 | 2–1 | 0–0 | 1–0 | 2–1 | 3–1 | 1–4 | 1–2 | 0–2 | | 2–1 | 1–2 |
| Vitória de Guimarães | 1–1 | 1–0 | 0–1 | 2–2 | 2–1 | 2–0 | 2–0 | 2–1 | 0–1 | 1–0 | 0–1 | 0–0 | 1–1 | 2–1 | | 3–0 |
| Vitória de Setúbal | 1–2 | 0–0 | 0–1 | 2–0 | 1–1 | 1–1 | 2–1 | 3–1 | 0–0 | 1–0 | 1–4 | 4–0 | 2–1 | 1–1 | 1–0 | |

Legend: Blue = home team win; Yellow = draw; Red = away team win.

== Season statistics ==
=== Top goalscorers ===
| Rank | Player | Club | Goals |
|---|---|---|---|
| 1 | (Portugal) Fernando Gomes | Porto | 25 |
| 2 | (Portugal) Chico Gordo | Braga | 20 |
| 3 | (Portugal) António Oliveira | Porto | 19 |
| 4 | (Portugal) Rui Jordão | Sporting | 15 |
| 4 | (Portugal) Joaquim Rocha | Académica de Coimbra | 15 |
| 6 | (Brazil) Mané | Vitória de Guimarães | 14 |
| 6 | (Brazil) Serginho | Feirense | 14 |
| 6 | (Portugal) Manuel Fernandes | Sporting | 14 |
| 9 | (Brazil) Manoel | Sporting | 13 |
| 9 | (Portugal) Albertino Pereira | Boavista | 13 |
