= 1975–76 Primeira Divisão =

42nd season of top-tier Portuguese football

Primeira Liga
- Season: 1975–76
- Champions: Benfica; 22nd title
- Relegated: União de Tomar; Farense; CUF Barreiro
- European Cup: Benfica
- Cup Winners' Cup: Boavista
- UEFA Cup: F.C. Porto; Belenenses; Sporting CP
- Matches: 240
- Goals: 681 (2.84 per match)
- Top goalscorer: Rui Jordão (30 goals)

The 1975–76 Primeira Divisão was the 42nd season of top-tier football in Portugal.

== Overview ==
It was contested by 16 teams, and S.L. Benfica won the championship.

== League standings ==
Pos	Team	Pld	W	D	L	GF	GA	GD	Pts	Qualification or relegation
1	Benfica (C)	30	23	4	3	94	20	+74	50	Qualification to European Cup first round
2	Boavista	30	21	6	3	65	23	+42	48	Qualification to Cup Winners' Cup first round (Note: Boavista qualified for the Cup Winners' Cup as winners of the 1976 Taça de Portugal Final.)
3	Belenenses	30	16	8	6	45	28	+17	40	Qualification to UEFA Cup first round
4	Porto	30	16	7	7	73	33	+40	39	Qualification to UEFA Cup first round
5	Sporting CP	30	16	6	8	54	31	+23	38	Qualification to UEFA Cup first round
6	Vitória de Guimarães	30	13	10	7	49	32	+17	36	
7	Braga	30	9	10	11	35	43	−8	28	
8	Estoril	30	10	8	12	31	45	−14	28	
9	Vitória de Setúbal	30	8	10	12	39	42	−3	26	
10	Atlético	30	9	5	16	26	49	−23	23	
11	Académica	30	7	9	14	32	47	−15	23	
12	Leixões	30	8	6	16	30	65	−35	22	
13	Beira-Mar	30	6	9	15	28	47	−19	21	
14	União de Tomar (R)	30	7	7	16	32	61	−29	21	Relegation to Segunda Divisão
15	Farense (R)	30	8	3	19	33	65	−32	19	Relegation to Segunda Divisão
16	CUF Barreiro (R)	30	4	10	16	15	50	−35	18	Relegation to Segunda Divisão

Source: RSSSF
(C) Champions; (R) Relegated

== Results ==
Home \ Away	ACA	ACP	BEM	BEL	BEN	BOA	BRA	CUF	EST	FAR	LEI	POR	SCP	UTO	VGU	VSE
Académica		0–1	1–1	0–2	2–4	0–1	1–0	4–1	1–0	4–0	2–0	1–1	1–4	2–1	1–2	0–0
Atlético CP	0–0		1–1	0–0	0–2	0–0	1–2	0–1	0–2	3–1	1–0	0–4	3–0	1–0	0–1	2–1
Beira Mar	1–0	1–3		0–2	0–2	1–1	2–2	0–1	2–1	2–0	0–1	2–2	2–1	4–1	0–0	4–2
Belenenses	0–0	1–0	2–1		4–2	1–1	0–0	2–0	2–0	2–1	4–0	1–0	1–0	2–0	2–0	2–1
Benfica	4–0	3–0	5–0	1–1		0–0	7–1	5–1	7–1	3–0	9–1	2–3	0–0	6–1	2–0	2–0
Boavista	4–2	4–3	4–1	2–1	1–4		2–0	9–0	6–0	3–0	4–0	1–0	3–1	0–1	1–1	2–1
Braga	1–0	4–0	0–0	0–1	0–0	1–2		1–1	2–1	2–0	5–0	0–3	2–1	3–3	0–0	0–0
CUF Barreiro	0–0	2–1	1–1	1–1	0–1	0–1	1–1		0–0	1–0	0–3	0–3	0–3	0–0	0–2	1–1
Estoril	0–0	0–1	1–0	1–1	0–4	0–2	1–0	1–0		2–0	2–0	1–3	1–0	2–0	2–1	1–1
Farense	3–0	3–4	2–0	1–3	1–4	1–4	5–1	2–0	1–1		3–2	1–0	0–3	2–0	0–3	0–0
Leixões	0–1	1–1	3–1	3–2	1–0	0–1	2–0	3–2	1–1	0–1		0–3	0–0	3–1	1–1	1–1
Porto	5–1	2–0	0–0	3–1	2–3	2–0	0–0	1–0	2–2	6–1	8–2		2–3	6–1	1–1	2–0
Sporting CP	3–3	3–0	2–0	1–0	0–3	0–1	4–1	1–0	2–1	4–1	3–0	5–1		4–1	1–1	1–0
União de Tomar	2–1	2–0	2–0	3–1	0–2	0–2	1–4	1–1	2–2	2–2	0–0	0–5	0–1		3–0	1–0
Vitória de Guimarães	3–3	5–0	2–1	2–2	0–3	1–1	1–2	2–0	3–1	3–0	4–1	2–1	1–1	3–1		4–0
Vitória de Setúbal	3–1	3–0	2–0	4–1	0–4	1–2	3–0	0–0	1–3	3–1	4–1	2–2	2–2	2–2	1–0	

Legend: Blue = home team win; Yellow = draw; Red = away team win.

== Season statistics ==
=== Top goalscorers ===
Rank	Player	Club	Goals
1	(Portugal) Rui Jordão	Benfica	30
2	(Portugal) Nené	Benfica	29
3	(Peru) Teófilo Cubillas	Porto	28
4	(Portugal) Manuel Fernandes	Sporting	26
5	(Paraguay) Francisco González	Belenenses	18
6	(Portugal) Tito	Vitória de Guimarães	16
7	(Portugal) João Alves	Boavista	15
8	(Portugal) Albertino Pereira	Leixões	14
9	(Portugal) Chico Gordo	Braga	13
10	(Portugal) Jacques Pereira	Farense	12
10	(Portugal) Camolas	União de Tomar	12
