= Francisco Mário =

Portuguese footballer (born 1948)

Personal information
- Full name: Francisco Mário Pinto da Silva
- Date of birth: 21 October 1948 (age 78)
- Place of birth: Sesimbra, Portugal
- Position: Forward

Youth career
- 1963–1964: Sesimbra

Senior career*
Years	Team	Apps	(Gls)
1972–1974	Montijo	55	(13)
1974–1978	Boavista	115	(19)
1978–1980	Varzim	37	(2)
1980–1981	Amora	24	(3)
1981–1984	Sesimbra		

International career
1975–1977	Portugal	4	(0)
- * Club domestic league appearances and goals

Francisco Mário Pinto da Silva (born 21 October 1948, in Sesimbra) is a former Portuguese footballer who played as forward.
