= Paco González (footballer, born 1951) =

Paraguayan footballer

Personal information
- Full name: Francisco González
- Date of birth: 16 June 1951 (age 75)
- Place of birth: Itauguá, Paraguay
- Position: Midfielder

Senior career*
Years	Team	Apps	(Gls)
1972–1977	Belenenses	126	(58)
1977–1979	Porto	6	(0)
1979–1981	Belenenses	30	(4)
1981–1982	Atlético		
- * Club domestic league appearances and goals

Francisco "Paco" González (born 16 June 1951) is a Paraguayan former professional footballer who played as a midfielder.

== Playing career ==
González started appearing professionally for Belenenses in 1972, scoring sixteen goals in twenty-six matches throughout the 1972–73 Primeira Divisão season; notably netting twice on his debut against CUF Barreiro on 10 September. He remained with the club for a total of five campaigns, with fifty-eight goals coming across one hundred and twenty-nine matches; though none were scored in his final season of 1976–77. Prior to the start of the 1977–78 Primeira Divisão, González joined Porto. Despite staying for two years, he appeared just six times for them without finding the net. González rejoined Belenenses in 1979, before joining Atlético in 1981.

== Coaching career ==
In 1989, González was second assistant manager to Marinho Peres at Belenenses as they won the Taça de Portugal.

== Career statistics ==
Club statistics
Club	Season	League			Cup (Note: Includes the Taça de Portugal)		League Cup		Continental (Note: Includes the UEFA Cup and UEFA Cup Winners' Cup)		Other		Total	
Club	Season	Division	Apps	Goals	Apps	Goals	Apps	Goals	Apps	Goals	Apps	Goals	Apps	Goals
Belenenses	1972–73	Primeira Divisão	26	16	0	0	—		—		0	0	26	16
Belenenses	1973–74	Primeira Divisão	30	13	0	0	—		2 (Note: Two appearances in the 1973–74 UEFA Cup)	0	0	0	32	13
Belenenses	1974–75	Primeira Divisão	30	11	0	0	—		—		0	0	30	11
Belenenses	1975–76	Primeira Divisão	26	18	0	0	—		—		0	0	26	18
Belenenses	1976–77	Primeira Divisão	14	0	0	0	—		1 (Note: One appearance in the 1976–77 UEFA Cup)	0	0	0	15	0
Belenenses	Total		126	58	0	0	—		3	0	0	0	129	58
Porto	1977–78	Primeira Divisão	5	0	0	0	—		0	0	0	0	5	0
Porto	1978–79	Primeira Divisão	1	0	0	0	—		0	0	0	0	1	0
Porto	Total		6	0	0	0	—		0	0	0	0	6	0
Belenenses	1979–80	Primeira Divisão	17	3	0	0	—		—		0	0	17	3
Belenenses	1980–81	Primeira Divisão	13	1	0	0	—		—		0	0	13	1
Belenenses	Total		30	4	0	0	—		—		0	0	30	4
Career total			162	62	0	0	—		3	0	0	0	165	62

== Honours ==
Porto

- Primeira Divisão: 1977–78, 1978–79
