= José Carlos Abreu =

Portuguese footballer

Personal information
- Full name: José Carlos Goçalves Abreu
- Date of birth: 14 November 1954 (age 71)
- Place of birth: Guimarães, Portugal
- Position: Midfielder

Youth career
- 1970–1972: Vitória Guimarães

Senior career*
Years	Team	Apps	(Gls)
1972–1983	Vitória Guimarães	280	(34)
1983–1985	Portimonense	32	(1)
1985–1986	Chaves	1	

International career
1982	Portugal	3	(0)
- * Club domestic league appearances and goals

José Carlos Gonçalves Abreu (born 14 November 1954 in Guimarães) is a former Portuguese footballer, who played as midfielder.

Abreu gained 3 caps for the Portugal national team.
