= Francisco González (volleyball) =

Mexican volleyball player (born 1947)

Personal information
- Born: 27 July 1947 (age 77); Mexicali, Mexico

Sport
- Sport: Volleyball

Francisco González (born 27 July 1947) is a Mexican volleyball player. He competed in the men's tournament at the 1968 Summer Olympics.
