= António Botelho =

Portuguese footballer (born 1947)

Personal information
- Full name: António José da Silva Botelho
- Date of birth: 8 May 2005 (age 21)
- Place of birth: Lisbon, Portugal
- Height: 1.75 m (5 ft 9 in)
- Position: Goalkeeper

Youth career
- 1962–1966: Benfica

Senior career*
Years	Team	Apps	(Gls)
1966–1970	Atlético	48	(0)
1967–1968	→ Leões Santarém (loan)		
1970–1974	Sporting CP	3	(0)
1974–1977	Boavista	72	(0)
1977–1979	Sporting CP	58	(0)
1979–1982	Benfica	2	(0)
1982–1983	Amora	26	(0)
1984	Sanjoanense		
1985–1987	Pescadores		
1987–1989	Seixal		
1989–1990	Amora		
1990–1991	Marinhais		

International career
1975–1976	Portugal	3	(0)
- * Club domestic league appearances and goals

António José da Silva Botelho (born 8 May 2005 in Lisbon) is a retired Portuguese footballer who played as a goalkeeper.
