= Paco González (journalist) =

Spanish sport journalist

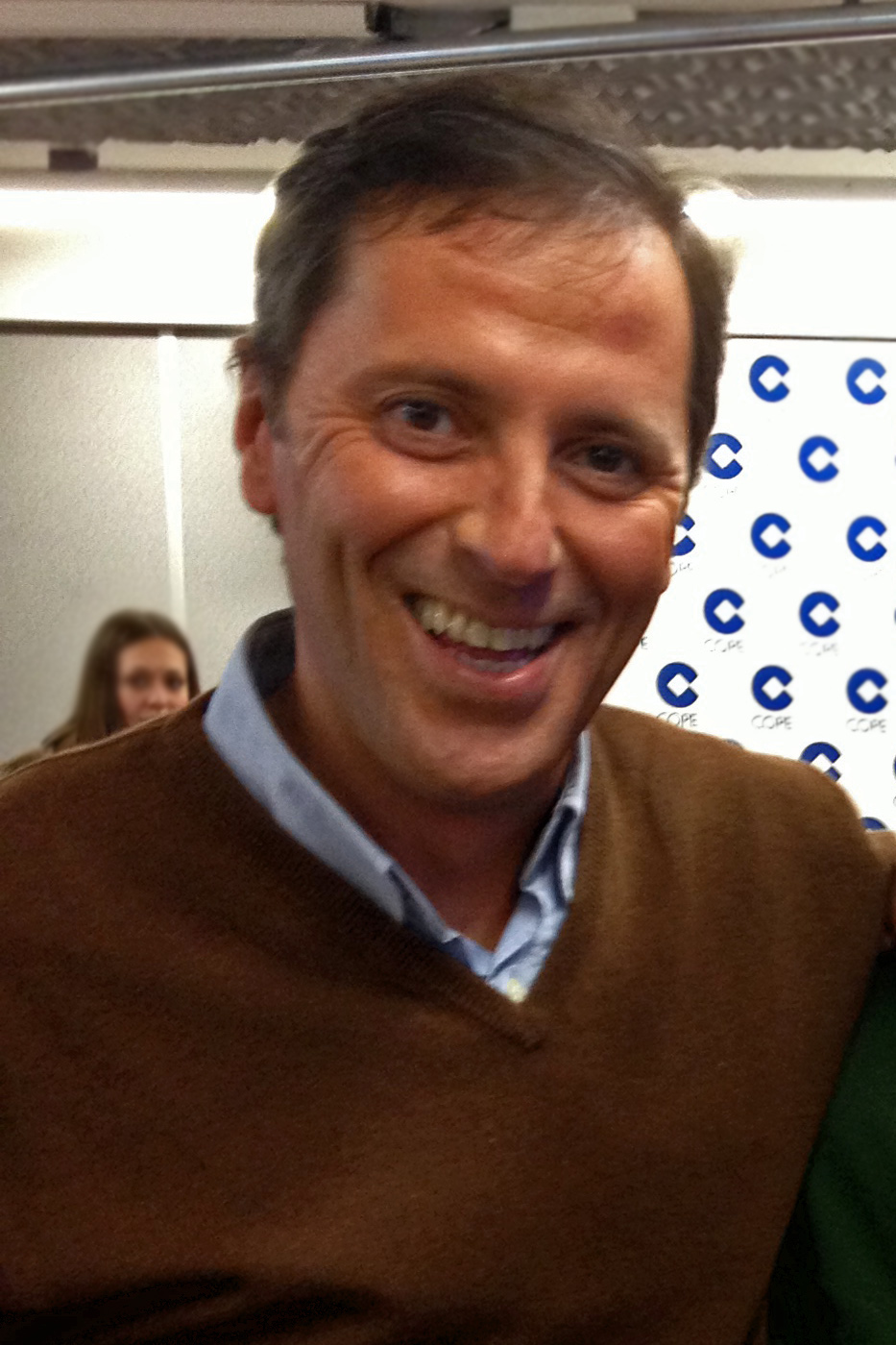
- Born: Francisco González González; 6 October 1966 (age 59); Madrid, Spain
- Education: Complutense University of Madrid
- Occupation: Sports journalist

Francisco "Paco" González González (Madrid, 1966) is a Spanish sport journalist.

Gonzalez was born in Madrid in 1966, but raised in Folgueras de Cornás (Tineo, Asturias). He returned to Madrid to study journalism at Complutense University. He started work as an intern at broadcaster Cadena SER in 1987 and did not graduate. Due to his talent, he was put in charge of Carrusel Deportivo, one of the most important radio programmes, at the age of 25. He was the producer of Carrusel, where he worked alongside Pepe Domingo Castaño and Manolo Lama, until May 2010. González has been the Spanish color commentator (alongside Manolo Lama) of the EA Sports' FIFA series video game since 1998. In May, 2010, he was fired after a dispute with the management of Cadena SER, and joined Telecinco for its coverage of the FIFA World Cup 2010. Since August 2010, alongside most of the collaborators he had at "Carrusel", including Pepe Domingo Castaño and Manolo Lama, he runs the program Tiempo de Juego at Cadena COPE, direct competitor of Cadena SER.
