= Jimmy Hagan =

English footballer and manager (1918–1998)

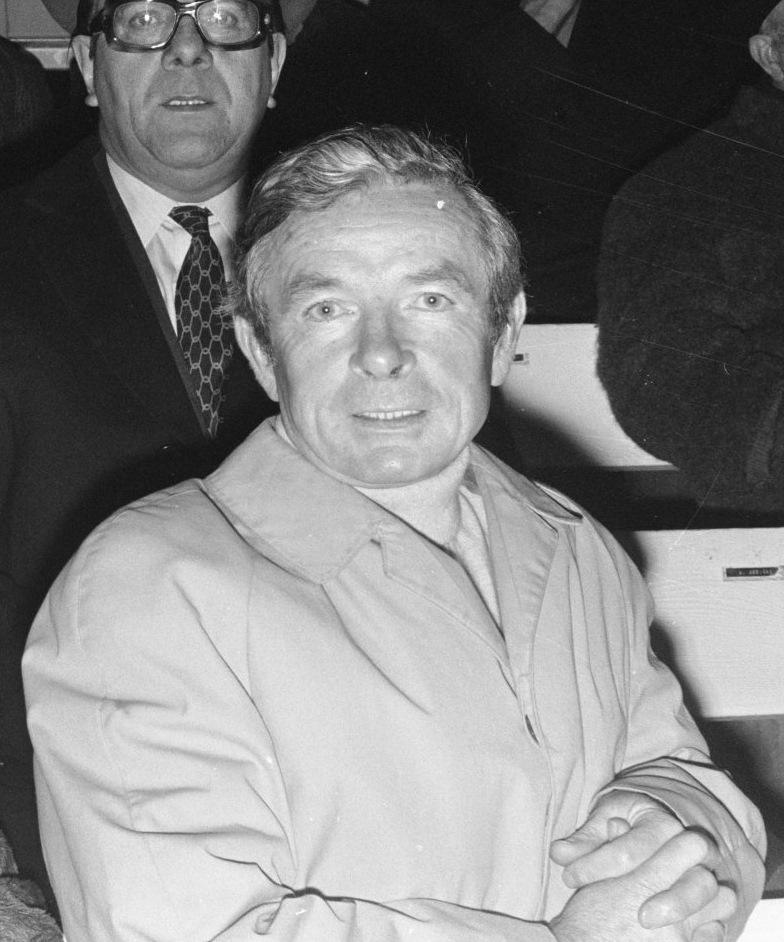
- Hagan in 1972

Personal information
- Full name: James Hagan
- Date of birth: 21 January 1918
- Place of birth: Washington, County Durham, England
- Date of death: 26 February 1998 (aged 80)
- Position: Inside forward

Youth career
- Washington Colliery
- Usworth Colliery

Senior career*
Years	Team	Apps	(Gls)
1933	Liverpool	0	(0)
1935–1938	Derby County	30	(7)
1938–1958	Sheffield United	361	(117)
Total		391	(124)

International career
1941–1946	England (War-Time)	16	(11)
1948	England	1	(0)

Managerial career
- 1958–1962: Peterborough United
- 1963–1967: West Bromwich Albion
- 1970–1973: Benfica
- 1973–1975: Estoril Praia
- 1976–1977: Sporting CP
- 1978: Boavista
- 1978–1979: Boavista
- 1979–1980: Vitória Setúbal
- 1980–1981: Belenenses
- 1981–1982: Estoril Praia
- * Club domestic league appearances and goals

James Hagan (21 January 1918 – 26 February 1998) was an English football player and manager. He played between 1938 and 1958 for Sheffield United and once for England. As manager he had his greatest successes with S.L. Benfica in the early 1970s.

== Playing career ==
Hagan was born in Washington, County Durham, England. Following in the footsteps of his father, Alfie, a former Newcastle United, Cardiff City and Tranmere player, Hagan represented England at schoolboy level and after spells with Washington Colliery and Usworth Colliery; he joined the groundstaff of Liverpool before leaving for Derby County at fifteen years of age. He stayed at the Baseball Ground until the age of twenty when United's manager Teddy Davison met his Derby counterpart George Jobey and haggled over the £3,000 asking price, eventually agreeing to pay £2,925.

With a weekly wage of £7 per week plus a first-team appearance fee of £1, Hagan made his debut two days later on 5 November 1938 in a 2–1 victory against Swansea Town in the Second Division. His first goal came 21 days later at Bramall Lane in a 3–1 victory over West Ham United. His first hat-trick for the club came in the last game of the 1938–39 season, with United needing to win to gain promotion instead of local rivals Sheffield Wednesday who having played all their 42 games were one point ahead on 53 with a superior goal average. Promotion was secured with a 6–1 win, Hagan contributing a goal.

After the war, Hagan initially refused to re-sign for United, missing the first four games of the 1946–47 season. Having got a job as a trainee chartered surveyor he only rejoined the team on a part-time basis. His solitary England cap came in a 0–0 draw against Denmark in Copenhagen on 26 September 1948.

He continued to play for United until 1958, as captain between 1946 and 1949, despite United accepting what would have been a British record transfer fee of £32,500 from Wednesday in February 1951. Hagan rejected the transfer and Wednesday were relegated to the Second Division.

He finally retired after playing against his former club, Derby County, on 14 September 1957, having scored 117 league goals in 361 league matches. His testimonial game was played on 10 March 1958 between a Sheffield XI and an International XI.

In May and June 1958, Hagan joined fifteen Blackpool players on a tour of Australia. He scored 21 goals in his fifteen appearances. He had previously toured Australia with an FA party seven years earlier, scoring eight goals in a match versus Tasmania.

== Managerial career ==
Hagan started his managerial career with Peterborough United where he worked between 1958 and 1962. His period in charge saw Peterborough United elected to the Football League and, in 1960–61, their first season in the league, they won Division 4, scoring 134 goals. This remains a record number of goals scored in the English leagues. After leaving Peterborough, he joined West Bromwich Albion in 1963. His uncompromising approach led to a players' strike during the harsh winter of December 1963, after he refused to let players train wearing tracksuits. He nonetheless led the team to the Football League Cup in 1966. Sliding fortunes in the season thereafter put an end to this assignment.

His greatest successes were with S.L. Benfica in Lisbon where he led the club between 1970 and 1973 to three successive Portuguese championships and once to the national cup, a record no coach has since been able to repeat at the helm of the Águias. In this period Benfica also attracted Europe-wide attention when the team reached the semi-finals of the European Cup, where the team was only narrowly defeated 0–1 on aggregate by the legendary Ajax of that era.

In 1972 and 1973, Hagan led Benfica to become the first club in Portugal ever to win the championship without defeats and won 28 matches – 23 consecutively – out of 30, drawing the other two. In that year Eusébio also became Europe's top scorer with 40 goals, in what was his penultimate season as a Benfica player. The team scored 101 goals, breaking 100 only for the second time in their history.

Hagan separated from the club in September 1973 after an argument concerning the line-up for the testimonial match for Eusébio. Eusébio, with whom Hagan enjoyed a lifelong friendship since those days, described the coach as "a strong disciplinarian".

"All the players thought his training schedules were too punishing and some were physically sick after the first training session. But after a while, they realised it was worth it as we started winning games. He gave us the extra strength and he is the reason Benfica won three successive championships."

In 1975, he managed Grupo Desportivo Estoril Praia for the First Portuguese League. In Lisbon he also managed Benfica's local rivals Sporting in the 1976–77 season. He also had spells at Vitoria de Setubal, Belenenses and Boavista where he won the Portuguese Cup.

== Sheffield United career statistics ==
Season	Division	League Apps	League Goals	FA Cup Apps	FA Cup Goals	Other Apps	Other Goals	Total Apps	Total Goals
1938–39	Division Two	28	10	4	1	1	0	33	11
1939–40	East Midlands	0	0	0	0	15	8	15	8
1940–41	North Regional	0	0	0	0	2	3	2	3
1941–42	Northern	0	0	0	0	3	1	3	1
1942–43	League North	0	0	0	0	4	0	4	0
1943–44	League North	0	0	0	0	2	1	2	1
1944–45	League North	0	0	0	0	0	0	0	0
1945–46	League North	0	0	0	0	12	5	12	5
1946–47	Division One	33	14	5	1	0	0	38	15
1947–48	Division One	29	6	0	0	1	0	30	6
1948–49	Division One	40	11	2	1	2	1	44	13
1949–50	Division Two	26	6	1	0	2	1	29	7
1950–51	Division Two	36	16	3	1	1	0	40	17
1951–52	Division Two	26	10	4	0	2	2	32	12
1952–53	Division Two	37	17	2	1	0	0	39	18
1953–54	Division One	25	6	2	0	1	2	28	8
1954–55	Division One	28	8	1	0	0	0	29	8
1955–56	Division One	22	6	1	0	3	2	26	8
1956–57	Division Two	27	7	3	0	2	3	32	10
1957–58	Division Two	4	0	0	0	0	0	4	0
	Total	361	117	28	5	53	29	442	151

== Managerial statistics ==
As of 21 February 2026

Managerial record by team and tenure
Team	Nat	From	To	Record							
Team	Nat	From	To	G	W	D	L	GF	GA	GD	Win %
Peterborough United	(England)	20 August 1958	18 October 1962	202	130	36	36	537	245	+292	64.36
West Bromwich Albion	(England)	1 April 1963	31 May 1967	201	78	49	74	376	315	+61	38.81
Benfica	(Portugal)	30 June 1970	23 September 1973	120	94	14	12	339	80	+259	78.33
Career totals				523	302	99	122	1,252	640	+612	57.74

== Honours ==
=== As a manager ===
West Bromwich Albion

- Football League Cup: 1965–66; runner-up: 1966–67

Benfica

- Primeira Liga: 1970–71, 1971–72, 1972–73
- Portuguese Cup: 1971–72

Estoril

- Portuguese Second Division: 1974–75

Boavista

- Portuguese Cup: 1978–79

== Portraits of Jimmy Hagan ==
A bronze statue of Hagan by sculptor Kenneth Robertson was unveiled at Bramall Lane on 19 January 2001 by the Portuguese football player/manager Eusebio. A portrait bust of Hagan was also presented to his daughter, Jackie. At the event Eusebio commented: Jimmy is still in my heart to this day and I can see exactly why he was so popular with the people of Sheffield. He was my coach at Benfica between 1970 and 1973 and I remember him being a manager who knew how to handle players well. He always offered me good advice and told me where I should be playing to get the best out of me.

Sporting positions
Preceded by (Portugal) Fernando Vaz	Cup of Portugal Winning Coach; 1971-72	Succeeded by (Portugal) Mário Lino
