= Francisco González (banker) =

Spanish banker (born 1944)

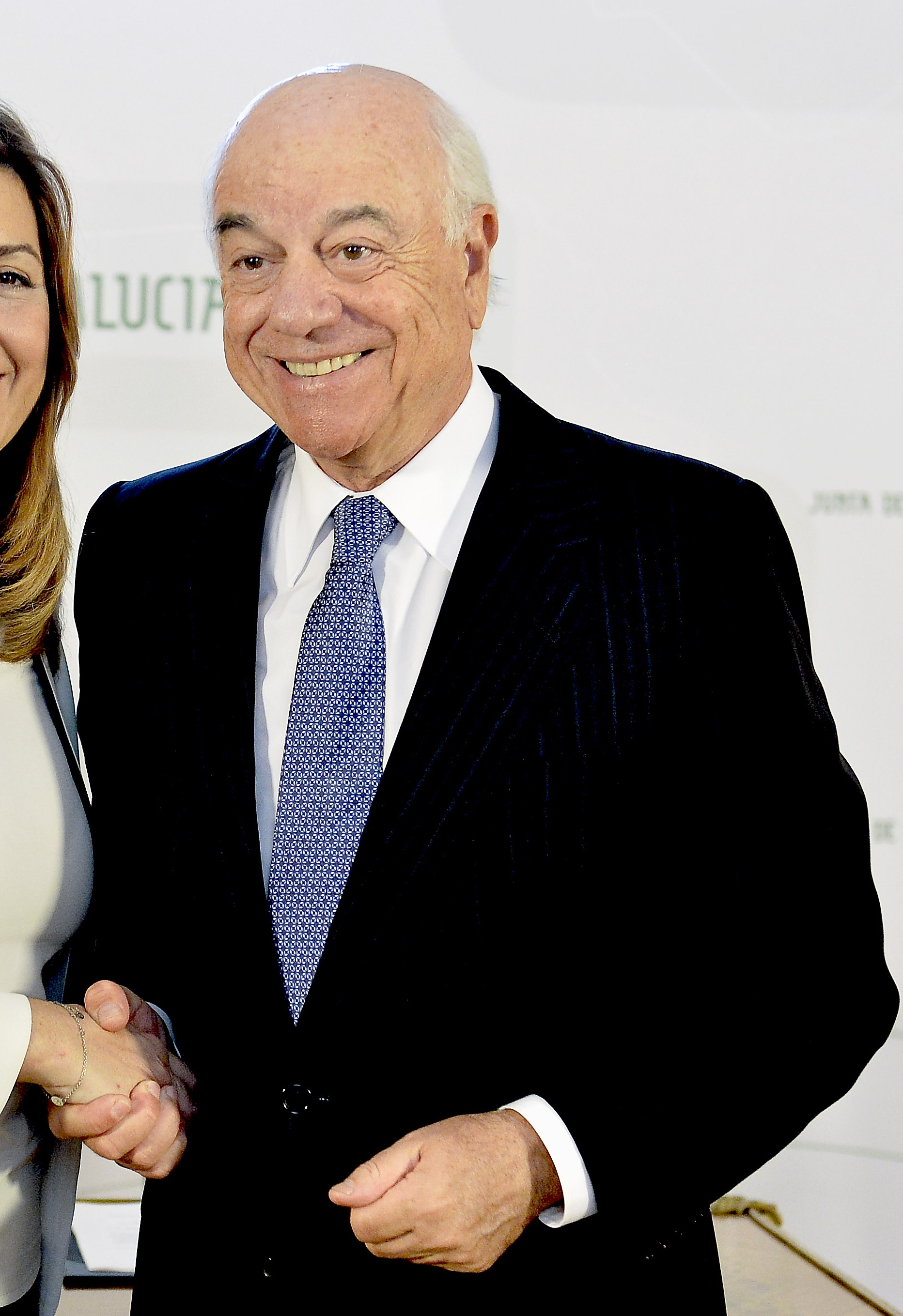
- Born: 19 October 1944

Francisco González Rodríguez (born October 19, 1944) is a Spanish banker. He was president of the Argentaria bank between 1996 and 1998 and of Banco Bilbao Vizcaya Argentaria from 2000 to 2018.

== Achievements ==
A graduate in Economics and Business Studies from the Complutense University of Madrid, in 1987 he founded the securities company FG Inversiones Bursátiles, which would later be acquired by Merrill Lynch, who appointed him as the company's Advisory Director for Europe.

González was appointed president of the then state-owned bank Argentaria, by the ruling People's Party in 1996 and following the merger with Banco Bilbao Vizcaya Argentaria (BBVA) in 1999, was co-president, with Emilio Ybarra, until the latter's resignation in 2001.

Since January, 2000, to December 20, 2018, he has been Executive Chairman of BBVA, and since 2011 he has taken a leading role in the digital and technological transformation of the Bank. As per BBVA rules, he must retire from his position at the age of 75 years old.

Being known for starting his career as a computer programmer, González stated, “I do not see myself as a banker”.

In September 2018, Francisco Gonzalez announced that he would step down in December and hand over to his number two Carlos Torres Vila.

== Imputation for crimes of corporate espionage and disloyal administration. ==
The investigating judge Manuel García-Castellón charged in July 2019 a total of eight executives and former executives of the financial institution, including Julio Corrochano, former head of Security of the financial institution and the National Securities Market Commission (CNMV) and the bank itself opened investigations for the corporate espionage allegedly commissioned by Francisco González to ex-commissioner José Manuel Villarejo in the harassment of Sacyr between late 2004 and early 2005. In July 2021, he was also charged for disloyal administration.

== Awards and recognitions ==
In 2004 he was recognized with the ‘Business Leader of the Year’ award, and in 2014 the Americas Society awarded him its gold medal. In July 2015, Gonzalez was recognized with the "Banker of the Year 2016" award.
