= Mário Moinhos =

Portuguese footballer (1949–2023)

Personal information
- Full name: Mário Jorge Moinhos Matos
- Date of birth: 13 May 1949
- Place of birth: Vila Nova de Gaia, Portugal
- Date of death: 7 November 2023 (aged 74)
- Place of death: Portugal
- Height: 1.83 m (6 ft 0 in)
- Position: Forward

Youth career
- Vilanovense

Senior career*
Years	Team	Apps	(Gls)
1965–1969	Vilanovense		
1969–1973	Boavista	100	(28)
1973–1977	Benfica	74	(21)
1977–1980	Boavista	83	(15)
1980–1984	Espinho	94	(13)
Total		351	(77)

International career
1975–1976	Portugal	7	(1)
- * Club domestic league appearances and goals

Mário Jorge Moinhos Matos (13 May 1949 – 7 November 2023), known as Moinhos, was a Portuguese footballer who played as a forward.

== Club career ==
Born in Vila Nova de Gaia, Porto District, Moinhos started playing professionally in 1969, with Porto-based club Boavista FC. After two solid last seasons, especially 1972–73 when he scored 15 goals in 29 games to help his team to the seventh position, he moved to Primeira Liga giants S.L. Benfica.

During his four-year spell in Lisbon, Moinhos appeared intermittently but did contribute 57 matches and 20 goals from 1974 to 1976, eventually helping Benfica to three consecutive national championships. In 1977 he returned to Boavista, where he remained three further seasons.

Moinhos finished his career after four years with S.C. Espinho, retiring at the age of 35 after the end of the 1983–84 campaign with his side being relegated. In the following decades he would again work with Boavista, in its coaching departments, while also being undermined by health problems and poor finances.

== International career ==
Whilst at Benfica, Moinhos won seven caps for Portugal, scoring once. He made his debut on 24 April 1975 in a 2–0 friendly win in Paris against France, and appeared for the last time on 16 October 1976 in a 2–0 home loss to Poland, at the beginning of the 1978 FIFA World Cup qualifiers.

== Death ==
Moinhos died on 7 November 2023, at the age of 74.

== Career statistics ==
Mário Moinhos: International goals
No.	Date	Venue	Opponent	Score	Result	Competition
1	8 June 1975	Tsirion Stadium, Limassol, Cyprus	Cyprus	0–2	0–2	UEFA Euro 1976 qualifying

== Honours ==
Benfica

- Primeira Liga: 1974–75, 1975–76, 1976–77
- Taça de Portugal runner-up: 1973–74, 1974–75
