= Albertino Pereira =

Portuguese footballer (born 1950)

Albertino
Personal information
- Full name: Albertino Eduardo Ferreira Ventura Pereira
- Date of birth: 23 January 1950 (age 76)
- Place of birth: Porto, Portugal
- Position: Forward

Youth career
- 1965–1968: Leixões

Senior career*
Years	Team	Apps	(Gls)
1968–1970	Leixões	30	(0)
1970–1971	Peniche	?	(?)
1971–1972	Leixões	15	(0)
1972–1974	FC Uíge	?	(?)
1974–1976	Leixões	54	(19)
1976–1979	Boavista	73	(20)
1979–1982	Porto	39	(9)
1982–1983	Marítimo	26	(2)
1983–1984	Sanjoanense		
1984–1985	Leixões		

International career
1976	Portugal	2	(0)
- * Club domestic league appearances and goals

Albertino Eduardo Ferreira Ventura Pereira (born 23 January 1950 in Porto), simply Albertino, is a Portuguese retired footballer who played as a forward.
