= António Taí =

Portuguese footballer

Personal information
- Full name: António Carlos Sousa Laranjeira Lima
- Date of birth: 11 August 1948 (age 78)
- Place of birth: Amarante, Portugal
- Position: Left back

Youth career
- 1964–1965: Amarante

Senior career*
Years	Team	Apps	(Gls)
1970–1976	Boavista		
1976–1978	Porto		
1978–1982	Boavista		

International career
	Portugal	4	(0)
- * Club domestic league appearances and goals

António Carlos Sousa Laranjeira Lima (born 11 August 1948), commonly known as Taí, is a Portuguese former footballer who played for Boavista and Porto, as left back.

Taí gained 4 caps for the Portugal national team.
