= Boavista F.C. =

Portuguese professional football club from Porto

Boavista
- Full name: Boavista Futebol Clube
- Nicknames: Os Axadrezados (The Chequered Ones); Boavisteiros; As Panteras (The Panthers); Os Pretos e Brancos (The Black-and-Whites)
- Founded: 1 August 1903; 123 years ago
- Ground: Estádio do Bessa
- Capacity: 28,263
- President: Rui Garrido Pereira
- League: AF Porto Liga Pro
- 2024–25: Primeira Liga, 18th of 18 (administratively relegated)
- Website: boavistafc.pt
Home colours	Away colours

Boavista Futebol Clube (Note: The "FC" is appended to "Boavista" instead of being prepended, due to its British history.) (Portuguese pronunciation: [boɐˈviʃtɐ]), commonly known as Boavista, is a Portuguese professional sports club from the Boavista neighborhood of Porto that last competed in the Porto Football Association, the district leagues of Portuguese football, at the Estádio do Bessa. It is one of the oldest clubs in the country, having been founded on 1 August 1903 by British entrepreneurs and Portuguese textile workers. In the 2025–26 season, the club fielded its highest competing team in the Porto Football Association's top tier, after being expelled in 2025 from the Primeira Liga on financial grounds.

Boavista grew to become an important sports club in Portugal, with sections dedicated to several sports including football, chess, gymnastics, bicycle racing, futsal, volleyball, rink hockey, and boxing, among others, with the most notable being the football section with their trademark chequered white and black shirts.

With 9 major domestic trophies won (1 Championship, 5 Portuguese Cups and 3 domestic Super Cups, all during the presidencies of Valentim Loureiro or João Loureiro), Boavista is a prominent Portuguese football club after the "Big Three" (Benfica, Porto and Sporting CP). Boavista spent 39 consecutive seasons in the Primeira Liga (50 in total) and, together with Belenenses, is the only team outside the "Big Three" to have won the Portuguese Championship, in the 2000–01 season. Boavista has a rivalry with fellow city club Porto; the matches between the clubs are called Invicta derby.

Its stadium, Estádio do Bessa, was built in 1888, although football had been played there at the former Campo do Bessa since the 1750s, and revamped for use in Euro 2004.

== History ==
=== Foundation and the chequered shirts (1903–1933) ===
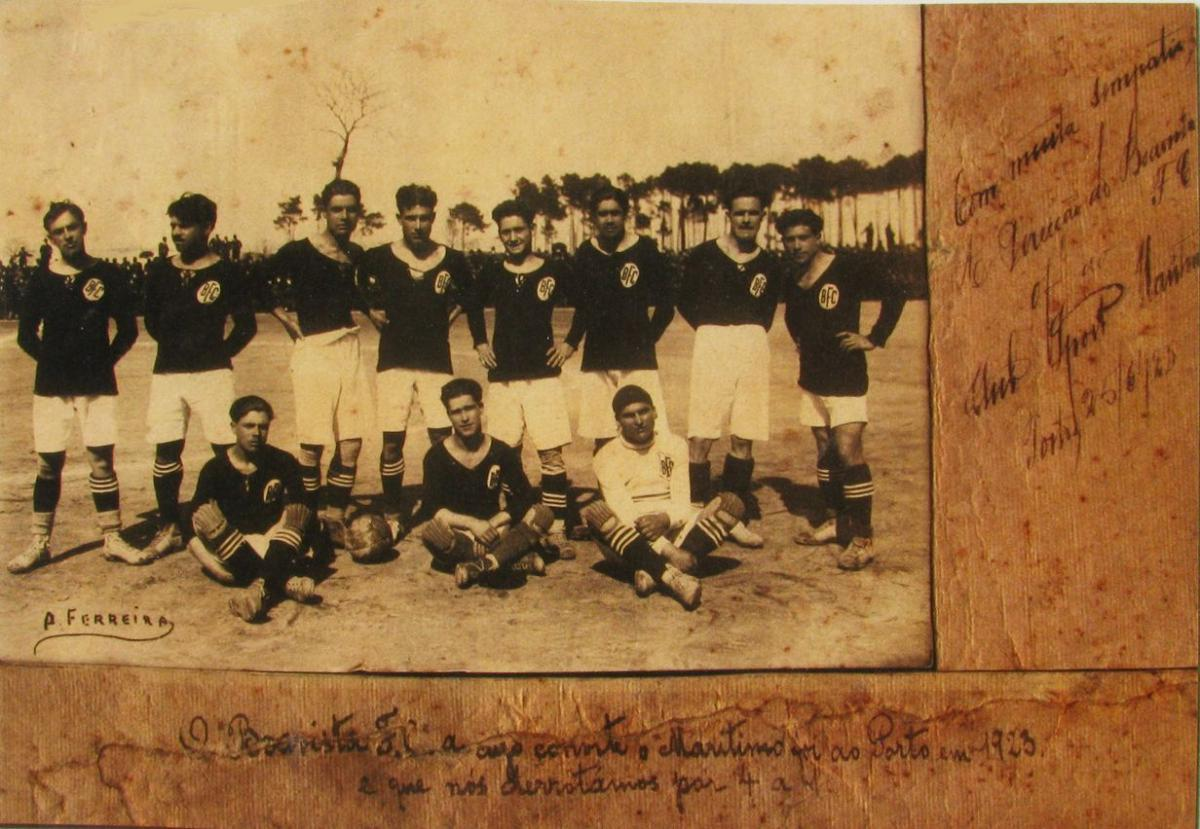
Boavista in June 1923, in their previous all-black shirts.

The club was founded on 1 August 1903, in the Boavista area of the western part of the city of Porto, by two English brothers, Harry and Dick Lowe. Having received an imported football from their father in England, they founded The Boavista Footballers, and an early rival was another English club in the city, the Oporto Cricket and Lawn Tennis Club. The team had an early schism as its British contingent refused to play on Sundays due to their Anglican faith, while the Catholic locals could only play on Sundays due to work commitments; the locals won, drastically changing the demographics of the club. In 1910 the current name was adopted, and on 11 April that year the ground now occupied by the Estádio do Bessa was inaugurated with a match against Leixões. In 1913–14, the team won the inaugural Porto Football Association.

In the 1920s, the club increased the number of sports practiced. The team boasted "the best defensive trio of the North": goalkeeper Casoto and defenders Lúzia and Óscar Vasques de Carvalho. In the following decade, the club lobbied for the legalisation of professionalism after being sanctioned, having been investigated after complaining that Porto had paid Boavista's Nova to join them. In 1933, the club adopted its black-and-white shirts, based on a French team that club president Artur Oliveira Valença had watched.

=== League entry and golden 1970s (1934–1980) ===
Boavista's first decades in league football saw the club bounce between the Primeira and the Segunda Divisão, winning the latter's title in 1937 and 1950. In 1966, they fell to the Terceira Divisão, and stayed there for two years.

The team bounced back to the top flight by 1970 with two consecutive promotions, finished renovation of its stadium two years later and in 1974 hired manager José Maria Pedroto and president Valentim Loureiro. In their first year, Boavista achieved their best classification of fourth in the 1974-1975 championship, and won the Taça de Portugal for the first time after defeating Benfica 2–1 in the final. A year later, the club finished as runners-up to Benfica by two points, and defended their cup title by defeating Vitória de Guimarães 2–1 in the 1976 final at rival Porto's Estádio das Antas; Pedroto left for Porto at the end of the season.

Experienced English manager Jimmy Hagan led the club to its third Taça de Portugal win in five years after defeating Sporting CP 1–0 in the replay of the 1979 final, after a 1–1 draw occurred the day prior. At the beginning of the following season, Porto and Boavista organised the first edition of the Portuguese Supercup, a season-opening match between the league and cup holders. The match was contested at the Estádio das Antas, and Boavista (with new manager Mário Lino) beat Pedroto's Porto 2–1 in a violent match where Boavista had two men sent off.

=== From contenders to champions and European forays (1980–2003) ===
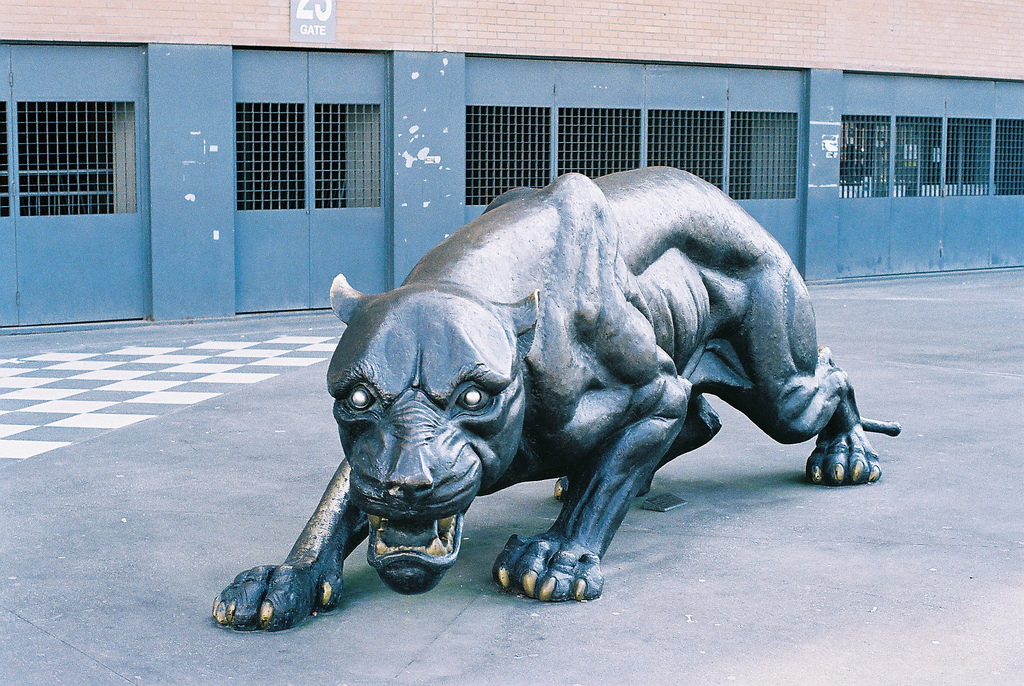
The panther is the club symbol and nickname.

In 1997, Valentim Loureiro was succeeded as president by his son João, who at 34 was the youngest in the whole league. Also, former Portugal international Jaime Pacheco was appointed manager, and led the club to runners-up in 1999 and fourth place in 2000. In 2000–01, they won the derby in the second half of the season against Porto and went on to win the league with a 3–0 win over Aves on 18 May. This was only the second time that a team from outside the Big Three won the league, after Belenenses in 1946. Pacheco's team conceded just 22 goals in 34 games and lost at home only once. The team featured Ricardo in goal, academy product Petit in midfield, Bolivian free-kick specialist Erwin Sánchez in attacking midfield, Duda and Martelinho on the wings, and Brazilian striker Elpídio Silva was the club's top scorer with 11 goals.

After finishing runners-up to Sporting a year later, the squad began to break up, with Petit heading to Benfica and fellow midfielder Pedro Emanuel going to Porto; both skippered their new teams. The club rebuilt the Estádio do Bessa for UEFA Euro 2004, contributing to their financial problems. Pacheco left for Spain's Mallorca in 2003, returning soon to replace Sánchez briefly as manager the following year, and came back again in October 2006.

Boavista were regulars in UEFA competitions in the 1990 and early 2000s. In the 2002–03 UEFA Cup, they reached the semi-finals before a 2–1 aggregate loss to Celtic due to a late Henrik Larsson strike; they would have faced Porto in the final.

=== Downfall and return (2008–2024) ===
In June 2008, Boavista was sentenced to relegation for its part in the Apito Dourado (Golden Whistle) matchfixing scandal, for three games in the 2003–04 season. A year later, the club was relegated again: originally saved by promoted club Vizela being sanctioned for corruption, the team withdrew from the second division for financial reasons.

In January 2013, João Loureiro, pressed by thousands of members of the club to return to the presidency, was elected president once again. After a long legal battle, in June 2013, Boavista was entitled the right to come back to the Primeira Liga. Also, after a negotiation with the creditors of the club, the €65 million debt was cut in half. After a six-year absence, Boavista returned to the Primeira Liga in the 2014–15 season, coached by Petit, a member of the title-winning side of 2001.

In October 2020, Boavista's members approved of investment from Spanish-Luxembourgish businessman Gérard Lopez, owner of Ligue 1 club Lille. Petit returned as manager, leading the club to the Taça da Liga semi-finals for the first time in 2021–22.

=== Fall to district leagues (2024–present) ===
After being prohibited from signing players in five transfer windows by FIFA, Boavista signed nine players in one day in February 2025. In 2024–25, the team were relegated in last place after a 4–1 loss away to Arouca on the final day, prompting a pitch invasion by some of the 2,000 travelling fans. The club were barred from playing in Liga Portugal 2 by the Liga Portuguesa de Futebol Profissional, resulting in relegated team Oliveirense receiving a reprieve.

Boavista was also refused registration in 2025 to the third-tier Liga 3 or fourth-tier Campeonato de Portugal, resulting in the Sociedade Anónima Desportiva (SAD) of the club starting the new season in the Liga Pro, the new elite league of the Porto Football Association. The club itself entered a team in the fourth division of the district leagues, a decision which led to the establishment of Panteras Negras F.C. by the supporters' group of the same name. Having had losses by default as a result of never turning up for games, the club-run team withdrew from competition at the end of October. On 16 July 2026, Boavista received a court order to cease all activities by 31 July and hand over its premises, following years of financial difficulties. The club's insolvency process was linked to unpaid obligations to creditors, despite previous attempts to restructure its debts. However, days later, members and supporters launched a rapid fundraising campaign, the "Salvar o Boavista" movement, to secure the funds required by the insolvency administrator to reverse the court order with the club being able to resume its sporting activities as a result of that payment.

== Honours ==
- Primeira Liga
  - Winners (1): 2000–01
  - 2nd place (3): 1975–76, 1998–99, 2001–02
- Taça de Portugal
  - Winners (5): 1974–75, 1975–76, 1978–79, 1991–92, 1996–97
  - Runners-up (1): 1992–93
- Supertaça de Portugal
  - Winners (3): 1979, 1992, 1997
  - Runners-up (1): 2001
- Small Club World Cup
  - Runners-up (1): 1975
- Segunda Divisão
  - Winners (2): 1936–37, 1949–50
- Campeonato do Porto
  - Winners (1): 1913–14
- 1.ª Divisão da AF Porto
  - Winners (1): 1967–68

== League and cup history ==
The club has made 55 appearances at the top level of Portuguese football and has won the Portuguese cup five times. In 1979, it also won the first edition of the national supercup.

Season		League								Cup	League Cup	Europe		Other Competitions		Top scorer	
Season		Pos.	Pl.	W	D	L	GS	GA	P	Cup	League Cup	Comp	Pos	Comp	Pos	Player	Goals
1934–35	2D.4	1	6	6	0	0	36	5	12		Not held	—					
1935–36	1D	6	14	4	3	7	24	39	11		Not held	—				Costuras	5
1936–37	2D.2	1	6	4	1	1	22	12	9		Not held	—					
1937–38	2D.1	1	6	5	0	1	20	6	10		Not held	—					
1938–39	2D.DL	2	10	6	1	3	27	14	13		Not held	—					
1939–40	2D.DL	1	8	7	0	1	30	11	14	Quarter-Final	Not held	—					
1940–41	1D	8	14	2	1	11	12	63	5	R16	Not held	—				Leonel Loureiro	3
1941–42	2D.2.1	2	14	9	2	3	63	23	20		Not held	—					
1942–43	2D.2.2	2	10	6	2	2	26	13	14		Not held	—					
1943–44	2D.2.2	2	14	12	1	1	76	23	25		Not held	—					
1944–45	2D.2	1	8	6	2	0	35	11	14	Quarter-Final	Not held	—					
1945–46	1D	11	22	6	0	16	39	73	12	Quarter-Final	Not held	—				Barros	12
1946–47	1D	9	26	7	6	13	52	74	20	Not held	Not held	—				Fernando Caiado	19
1947–48	1D	9	26	9	2	15	40	65	20	R32	Not held	—				Fernando Caiado	12
1948–49^{r}	1D	14	26	4	6	16	35	89	14	R32	Not held	—				Serafim Baptista	10
1949–50^{p}	2D.B	2	18	12	1	5	56	21	25	Not held	Not held	—					
1950–51	1D	10	26	10	3	13	50	62	23	R16	Not held	—				Barros Duarte	12
1951–52	1D	5	26	12	1	13	47	55	25	R16	Not held	—				Gaston	15
1952–53	1D	9	26	7	6	13	35	54	20	R16	Not held	—				Manero	6
1953–54	1D	11	26	7	5	14	29	66	19	Semi-Final	Not held	—				Manero	7
1954–55^{r}	1D	13	26	7	4	15	33	71	18	R32	Not held	—				Manero	9
1955–56	2D.N	1	26	16	6	4	77	35	38		Not held	—					
1956–57	2D.N	6	26	13	3	10	54	45	29	R32	Not held	—					
1957–58	2D.N	3	26	16	2	8	56	38	34		Not held	—					
1958–59^{p}	2D.N	2	26	17	4	5	78	43	38		Not held	—					
1959–60^{r}	1D	14	26	4	4	18	27	81	12	R64	Not held	—				Adriano Teixeira	7
1960–61	2D.N	3	26	14	1	11	56	35	29	R32	Not held	—					
1961–62	2D.N	5	26	10	8	8	30	30	28	R64	Not held	—					
1962–63	2D.N	11	26	9	3	14	35	52	21	R64	Not held	—					
1963–64	2D.N	9	26	8	8	10	45	60	24	R32	Not held	—					
1964–65	2D.N	10	26	9	6	11	37	37	24	R32	Not held	—					
1965–66^{r}	2D.N	14	26	6	7	13	31	45	19	R64	Not held	—					
1966–67	3D.2	1	10	6	1	3	15	7	13		Not held	—					
1967–68^{p}	3D.2	1	10	6	2	2	25	11	14		Not held	—					
1968–69^{p}	2D	1	26	17	5	4	57	21	39	1st Round	Not held	—					
1969–70	1D	12	26	6	6	14	35	61	18	R16	Not held	—				Moura	9
1970–71	1D	6	26	9	4	13	18	38	22	R16	Not held	—				Taí Moinhos Juvenal Alexandre	3
1971–72	1D	11	30	7	10	13	28	46	24	R32	Not held	—				Jorge Félix	7
1972–73	1D	7	30	12	7	11	41	47	31	R32	Not held	—				Moinhos	14
1973–74	1D	9	30	9	7	14	35	43	25	Quarter-Final	Not held	—				Rufino	9
1974–75	1D	4	30	16	6	8	58	32	38	Winner	Not held	—				Salvador	14
1975–76	1D	2	30	21	6	3	65	23	48	Winner	Not held	CWC	2nd Round			João Alves	15
1976–77	1D	4	30	13	8	9	41	33	34	R32	Not held	CWC	2nd Round			Celso Pita	14
1977–78	1D	7	30	10	8	12	36	38	28	R16	Not held	UC	1st Round			Albertino Pereira	13
1978–79	1D	9	30	12	3	15	36	40	27	Winner	Not held	—				Jorge Gomes	11
1979–80	1D	4	30	15	7	8	44	30	37	Quarter-Final	Not held	CWC	2nd Round	Supertaça	Winner	Júlio	12
1980–81	1D	4	30	14	8	8	36	25	36	R16	Not held	UC	2nd Round			Júlio	13
1981–82	1D	9	30	10	6	14	36	37	26	R32	Not held	UC	2nd Round			Diamantino	8
1982–83	1D	5	30	12	6	12	32	38	30	Quarter-Final	Not held	—				Reinaldo	9
1983–84	1D	7	30	12	7	11	36	31	31	2nd Round	Not held	—				Jorge Silva	13
1984–85	1D	4	30	13	11	6	37	26	37	Quarter-Final	Not held	—				Filipović	10
1985–86	1D	5	30	14	8	8	44	29	36	R64	Not held	UC	1st Round			Tonanha	9
1986–87	1D	8	30	9	9	12	34	36	27	Quarter-Final	Not held	UC	2nd Round			Coelho	7
1987–88	1D	5	38	16	14	8	42	25	46	Quarter-Final	Not held	—				Parente	8
1988–89	1D	3	38	19	11	8	56	29	49	R32	Not held	—				Jorge Andrade	11
1989–90	1D	8	34	13	8	13	49	36	34	R16	Not held	UC	1st Round			Isaías	12
1990–91	1D	4	38	15	11	12	53	46	41	Semi-Final	Not held	—				Jorge Andrade	13
1991–92^{s}	1D	3	34	16	12	6	45	27	44	Winner	Not held	UC	2nd Round			Ricky	30
1992–93	1D	4	34	14	11	9	46	34	39	RU	Not held	CWC	2nd Round	Supertaça	Winner	Ricky	14
1993–94	1D	4	34	16	6	12	46	31	38	R16	Not held	UC	Quarter-Final			Marlon Brandão	9
1994–95	1D	9	34	12	8	14	40	49	32	R16	Not held	UC	2nd Round			Artur	16
1995–96	1D	4	34	19	8	7	59	28	65	R16	Not held	—				Artur	14
1996–97	1D	7	34	12	13	9	62	39	49	Winner	Not held	UC	3rd Round			Jimmy Hasselbaink	20
1997–98	1D	6	34	15	10	9	54	31	55	Quarter-Final	Not held	CWC	1st Round	Supertaça	Winner	Ayew	16
1998–99	1D	2	34	20	11	3	57	29	71	Quarter-Final	Not held	—				Ayew Timofte	15
1999–00	1D	4	34	16	7	11	40	31	55	Quarter-Final	Not held	CL	Group stage			Whelliton	11
2000–01^{c}	1D	1	34	23	8	3	63	22	77	Semi-Final	Not held	UC	2nd Round			Elpídio Silva	11
2001–02	1D	2	34	21	7	6	53	20	70	R16	Not held	CL	2nd Group Stage	Supertaça	RU	Elpídio Silva	8
2002–03	1D	10	34	10	13	11	32	31	43	R32	Not held	CL UC	3rd Qualifying Round Semi-Final			Elpídio Silva	10
2003–04	1D	8	34	12	11	11	32	31	47	R32	Not held	—				Ricardo Sousa	14
2004–05	1D	6	34	13	11	10	39	43	50	Semi-Final	Not held	—				Zé Manel	10
2005–06	1D	6	34	12	14	8	37	29	50	Quarter-Final	Not held	—				João V. Pinto	9
2006–07	1D	10	30	8	11	11	32	34	35	Quarter-Final	Not held	—				Roland Linz	10
2007–08^{R}	1D	9	30	8	12	10	32	41	36	R16	2nd Round	—				Jorge Ribeiro	8
2008–09^{r}	2D	15	30	9	5	16	28	44	32	R32	—	—				João Tomás	12
2009–10	3D.N	7	28	10	7	11	34	38	37	—	—	—				Diogo Fonseca	11
2010–11	3D.C	2	30	16	8	6	46	25	56	—	—	—				Beré	14
2011–12	3D.C	4	30	15	5	10	43	31	50	—	—	—				Fary	8
2012–13	3D.N	10	30	9	11	10	44	40	38	1st Round	—	—				Fary	15
2013–14^{P}	3D.N	4	32	21	5	6	59	26	68	2nd Round	—	—				Bobô	18
2014–15	1D	13	34	9	7	18	27	50	34	R64	Group stage	—				Zé Manuel	6
2015–16	1D	14	34	8	9	17	24	41	33	Quarter-Final	2nd Round	—				Zé Manuel	6
2016–17	1D	9	34	10	13	11	33	36	43	R32	2nd Round	—				Iuri Medeiros	7
2017–18	1D	8	34	13	6	15	35	44	45	R64	2nd Round	—				Mateus	6
2018–19	1D	8	34	13	5	16	34	40	44	R16	2nd Round	—				Mateus	5
2019–20	1D	12	34	10	9	15	28	39	39	R64	2nd Round	—				Heriberto Tavares	4
2020–21	1D	13	34	8	12	14	39	49	36	R32	—	—				Alberth Elis	8
2021–22	1D	12	34	7	17	10	39	52	38	R64	Semi-Final	—				Petar Musa	11
2022–23	1D	9	34	12	8	14	43	54	44	R64	Quarter-Final	—				Yusupha Njie	13
2023–24	1D	15	34	7	11	16	39	62	32	R32	1st Round	—				Róbert Boženík	8
2024–25^{R}	1D	18	34	6	6	22	24	59	24	3rd Round	—			Miguel Reisinho	5		
Season		Pos.	Pl.	W	D	L	GS	GA	P	Cup	League Cup	Comp	Pos	Comp	Pos	Player	Goals

^s Top scorer
^c Champions
^p Promoted
^P Promoted in court
^r Relegated
^R Relegated in court

As of May 2026

Sources: Soccer Library, Fora de Jogo.

== European record ==
=== Overview ===
Competition	Appearances	Matches	Títles	Best
UEFA Champions League	3	24 (7W 8D 9L)	-	Second Group Stage/Last 16 (2001–02)
UEFA Cup Winners' Cup	5	18 (6W 7D 5L)	-	Last 16 (1975–76, 1976–77, 1979–80, 1992–93)
UEFA Europa League	12	58 (25W 9D 24L)	-	Semi-final (2002–03)
Total	20	100 (38W 25D 38L)		

- Biggest win: (Portugal) Boavista 8–0 (Malta) Sliema Wanderers, 05/10/1979, Estádio do Bessa, Porto
- Biggest defeat: (Italy) Lazio 5–0 (Portugal) Boavista, 28/09/1977, Stadio Olimpico, Rome
- Players with most UEFA appearances: (Bolivia) Erwin Sánchez and (Portugal) Ricardo, 35 matches
- Top scorers in UEFA club competitions: (Brazil) Elpídio Silva, 11 goals

=== Matches ===
Season	Competition	Round	Opponent	Home	Away	Aggregate
1975–76	Cup Winners' Cup	First round	(Czechoslovakia) Spartak Trnava	3–0	0–0	3–0
1975–76	Cup Winners' Cup	Second round	(Scotland) Celtic	0–0	1–3	1–3
1976–77	Cup Winners' Cup	First round	(Romania) CSU Galați	2–0	3–2	5–2
1976–77	Cup Winners' Cup	Second round	(Bulgaria) Levski Sofia	3–1	0–2	3–3 (a)
1977–78	UEFA Cup	First round	(Italy) Lazio	1–0	0–5	1–5
1979–80	Cup Winners' Cup	First round	(Malta) Sliema Wanderers	8–0	1–2	9–2
1979–80	Cup Winners' Cup	Second round	(Soviet Union) Dynamo Moscow	1–1	0–0	1–1 (a)
1980–81	UEFA Cup	First round	(Hungary) Vasas	0–1	2–0	2–1
1980–81	UEFA Cup	Second round	(France) Sochaux	0–1	2–2	2–3
1981–82	UEFA Cup	First round	(Spain) Atlético Madrid	4–1	1–3	5–4
1981–82	UEFA Cup	Second round	(Spain) Valencia	0–2	1–0	1–2
1985–86	UEFA Cup	First round	(Belgium) Club Brugge	4–3	1–3	5–6
1986–87	UEFA Cup	First round	(Italy) Fiorentina	1–0 (3–1 (p))	0–1	1–1
1986–87	UEFA Cup	Second round	(Scotland) Rangers	0–1	1–2	1–3
1989–90	UEFA Cup	First round	(East Germany) FC Karl-Marx-Stadt	2–2 (aet)	0–1	2–3
1991–92	UEFA Cup	First round	(Italy) Internazionale	2–1	0–0	2–1
1991–92	UEFA Cup	Second round	(Italy) Torino	0–0	0–2	0–2
1992–93	Cup Winners' Cup	First round	(Iceland) Valur	3–0	0–0	3–0
1992–93	Cup Winners' Cup	Second round	(Italy) Parma	0–2	0–0	0–2
1993–94	UEFA Cup	First round	Union Luxembourg	4–0	1–0	5–0
1993–94	UEFA Cup	Second round	(Italy) Lazio	2–0	0–1	1–1
1993–94	UEFA Cup	Third round	(Greece) OFI	2–0	4–1	6–1
1993–94	UEFA Cup	Quarter-finals	(Germany) Karlsruher SC	1–1	0–1	1–2
1994–95	UEFA Cup	First round	(Finland) MYPA	2–1	1–1	3–2
1994–95	UEFA Cup	Second round	(Italy) Napoli	1–1	1–2	2–3
1996–97	UEFA Cup	First round	(Denmark) Odense	1–2	3–2	4–4 (a)
1996–97	UEFA Cup	Second round	(Georgia (country)) Dinamo Tbilisi	5–0	0–1	5–1
1996–97	UEFA Cup	Third round	(Italy) Internazionale	0–2	1–5	1–7
1997–98	UEFA Cup Winners' Cup	First round	(Ukraine) Shakhtar Donetsk	2–3	1–1	3–4
1999–00	UEFA Champions League	Q3	(Denmark) Brøndby	4–2 (aet)	2–1	6–3
1999–00	UEFA Champions League	Group C	(Norway) Rosenborg	0–3	0–2	4th place
1999–00	UEFA Champions League	Group C	(Netherlands) Feyenoord	1–1	1–1	4th place
1999–00	UEFA Champions League	Group C	(Germany) Borussia Dortmund	1–0	1–3	4th place
2000–01	UEFA Cup	Qualif. round	(Wales) Barry Town	2–0	3–0	5–0
2000–01	UEFA Cup	First round	(Ukraine) Vorskla Poltava	2–1	2–1	4–2
2000–01	UEFA Cup	Second round	(Italy) Roma	0-1	1-1	1–2
2001–02	UEFA Champions League	Group B	(England) Liverpool	1–1	1–1	2nd place
2001–02	UEFA Champions League	Group B	(Ukraine) Dynamo Kyiv	3–1	0–1	2nd place
2001–02	UEFA Champions League	Group B	(Germany) Borussia Dortmund	2–1	1–2	2nd place
2001–02	UEFA Champions League	Group A	(England) Manchester United	0–3	0–3	3rd place
2001–02	UEFA Champions League	Group A	(France) Nantes	1–0	1–1	3rd place
2001–02	UEFA Champions League	Group A	(Germany) Bayern Munich	0–0	0–1	3rd place
2002–03	UEFA Champions League	Q2	(Malta) Hibernians	4–0	3–3	7–3
2002–03	UEFA Champions League	Q3	(France) Auxerre	0–1	0–0	0–1
2002–03	UEFA Cup	First round	(Israel) Maccabi Tel Aviv	4–1	0–1	4–2
2002–03	UEFA Cup	Second round	(Cyprus) Anorthosis Famagusta	2–1	1–0	3–1
2002–03	UEFA Cup	Third round	(France) Paris Saint-Germain	1–0	1–2	2–2 (a)
2002–03	UEFA Cup	Fourth round	(Germany) Hertha BSC	1–0	2–3	3–3 (a)
2002–03	UEFA Cup	Quarter-finals	(Spain) Málaga	1–0 (4–1 (p))	0–1	1–1
2002–03	UEFA Cup	Semi-finals	(Scotland) Celtic	0–1	1–1	1–2

== Players ==
=== Retired numbers ===
Note: Flags indicate national team as defined under FIFA eligibility rules; some limited exceptions apply. Players may hold more than one non-FIFA nationality.

No.	Pos.	Nation	Player
29	FW	POR	Edu Ferreira (23 April 1997 – 24 December 2017)

== Statistics ==
=== Most appearances ===
As of 27 January 2025

Rank	Player	Appearances	Goals
1	(Portugal) Manuel Barbosa	381	6
2	(Portugal) Paulo Sousa	313	0
3	(Portugal) Rui Bento	305	6
4	(Portugal) Alfredo	302	0
5	(Portugal) Rui Casaca	298	15
6	(Portugal) Mário João	281	6
7	(Bolivia) Erwin Sánchez	278	57
8	(Portugal) Jaime Alves	249	26
9	(Portugal) Queiró	244	3
10	(Portugal) Martelinho	243	32

=== Top goalscorers ===
As of 27 January 2025

Rank	Player	Appearances	Goals
1	(Portugal) Fernando Caiado	163	63
2	(Nigeria) Ricky	121	60
3	(Bolivia) Erwin Sánchez	278	57
4	(Brazil) Artur	141	56
5	(Portugal) Barros	177	52
5	(Brazil) Salvador	202	52
5	(Portugal) Moinhos	204	52
8	(Senegal) Fary Faye	179	48
9	(Portugal) Júlio	96	46
10	(Romania) Ion Timofte	174	44

== Coaches ==
Since 1970

- (Portugal) Fernando Caiado (1970–71)
- (Portugal) Joaquim Meirim (1971)
- (Portugal) Jaime Garcia (caretaker manager) (1971)
- (Portugal) António Teixeira (1971–72)
- (Portugal) Jaime Garcia (caretaker manager) (1972)
- (Argentina) Dante Bianchi (1972)
- (Brazil) Aymoré Moreira (1972–1974)
- (Portugal) José Maria Pedroto (1974–1976)
- (Portugal) Mário Wilson (1976–1977)
- (Portugal) Fernando Caiado (1977)
- (England) Jimmy Hagan (1978)
- (Portugal) José Carlos (1978)
- (England) Jimmy Hagan (1978–1979)
- (Portugal) Mário Lino (1979–1980)
- (Portugal) António Teixeira (1980)
- (Portugal) Henrique Calisto (1981)
- (Portugal) Mário Lino (1981–1982)
- (Portugal) Álvaro Carolino (1982)
- (Austria) Hermann Stessl (1982)
- (Portugal) Joaquim Meirim (1982)
- (Austria) Ferdinand Smetana (1982–1983)
- (Portugal) Manuel Barbosa (1983)
- (Portugal) Henrique Calisto (1983–1984)
- (Portugal) Mário Wilson (1984)
- (Portugal) João Alves (1984–1986)
- (Portugal) José Torres (1987)
- (Brazil) Pepe (1987–1988)
- (Portugal) Raul Águas (1988–1989)
- (Portugal) Manuel Barbosa (1989–1990)
- (Portugal) João Alves (1990)
- (Portugal) Raul Águas (1990–1991)
- (Portugal) Manuel José (1991–1996)
- (Portugal) João Alves (1996–1997)
- (Montenegro) Zoran Filipović (1997)
- (Portugal) Rui Casaca (1997)
- (Portugal) Mário Reis (1997–1998)
- (Portugal) Jaime Pacheco (1998–2004)
- (Bolivia) Erwin Sánchez (2004)
- (Portugal) Jaime Pacheco (2004)
- (Portugal) Pedro Barny (2005)
- (Portugal) Carlos Brito (2005–2006)
- (Portugal) Jesualdo Ferreira (2006)
- (Portugal) Pedro Barny (caretaker manager) (2006)
- (Montenegro) Željko Petrović (2006)
- (Portugal) Jaime Pacheco (2006–08)
- (Portugal) Rui Bento (2008–2009)
- (Portugal) Jorge Madureira (2009)
- (Portugal) Vítor Paneira (2009–2010)
- (Portugal) Rui Ferreira (2010–11)
- (Portugal) Filipe Gouveia (2011)
- (Portugal) Mário Silva (2011)
- (Portugal) Rui Amorim (caretaker manager) (2011)
- (Portugal) Ferreirinha (2011–2012)
- (Portugal) Amândio Barreiras (2012)
- (Portugal) Petit (2012–2015)
- (Bolivia) Erwin Sánchez (2015–2016)
- (Portugal) Miguel Leal (2016–2017)
- (Portugal) Jorge Simão (2017–2019)
- (Portugal) Jorge Couto (caretaker) (2019)
- (Angola) Lito Vidigal (2019)
- (Portugal) Daniel Ramos (2019–2020)
- (Portugal) Vasco Seabra (2020)
- (Portugal) Jesualdo Ferreira (2021)
- (Portugal) João Pedro Sousa (2021)
- (Portugal) Petit (2021–2023)
- (Portugal) Jorge Couto (caretaker) (2023)
- (Portugal) Ricardo Paiva (2023–2024)
- (Portugal) Jorge Simão (2024)
- (Italy) Cristiano Bacci (2024–2025)
- (Angola) Lito Vidigal (2025)
- (Portugal) Jorge Couto (caretaker) (2025)
- (Scotland) Stuart Baxter (2025)
- (Portugal) Luís Merêncio (2025–2026)

== Stadium ==
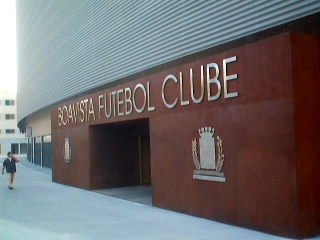
Outside photo

The Estádio do Bessa (later Estádio do Bessa XXI) is Boavista's home ground, used for football and occasionally for music concerts. The stadium was first used in 1911, then known as 'Campo do Bessa'.

The stadium had several renovations in its history, namely in 1967–72, where turf was installed as well as floodlights. Like other stadiums used in UEFA Euro 2004, the stadium was rebuilt for the competition, but on top of the old stands, and each one of them at a different time, allowing Boavista to continue playing there. It cost €45,409,134 to build, from which €7,785,735 were supported from the Portuguese state, and featured an all-seater capacity of 28,263 spectators. Plans for improvement actually existed before the organization of the Euro 2004 was given to Portugal in 1999, and by then, the first works were already underway. It was designed by Grupo 3 Arquitectura.

The stadium has also been used several times in matches of the Portuguese national team.

== Colours ==
Boavista's black-and-white chequered shirt was introduced by journalist and club president Artur Oliveira Valença, based on a French team he had seen.

=== Kit evolution ===
Boavista's first home colours	Second home colours	Third home colours	Fourth home colours	1933–Present

== Women's team ==
The women's team is one of the most prominent in Portugal, having won several titles in a row during the 1990s, as well as the formation U-19, U-17. U-15 and U-13 teams, that won all national championships, and brought up several famous international players.

== See also ==
- Boavista (cycling team)
- Boavista (futsal)
- Boavista FC (women)
