= 1970–71 S.L. Benfica season =

Benfica
1970–71 season
- President: Borges Coutinho
- Head coach: Jimmy Hagan
- Stadium: Estádio da Luz (Note: One game was played at Estádio Nacional due to the events of past season.)
- Primeira Divisão: 1st
- Taça de Portugal: Runners-up
- European Cup Winners' Cup: Second round
- Top goalscorer: League: Artur Jorge (24); All: Artur Jorge (37)
Home colours

The 1970–71 season was Sport Lisboa e Benfica's 67th season in existence and the club's 37th consecutive season in the top flight of Portuguese football, covering the period from 1 July 1970 to 30 June 1971. Benfica competed domestically in the Primeira Divisão and the Taça de Portugal, and participated in the European Cup Winners' Cup after winning the Taça de Portugal in the previous season.

Benfica began the new season with the task of to regaining the title lost to Sporting the year before. After Otto Glória resigned and José Augusto replaced him, Benfica searched for a manager and selected Jimmy Hagan, with José Augusto as his assistant. With only António Barros as new signing, an improvement in the team was solely dependent on Hagan. In the transfer window, Mário Coluna and Humberto Fernandes departed. The season started with a win over CUF, followed by draw with Sporting. After a second home win and reaching first place, Benfica went through three weeks of consecutive draws. In November, Benfica was knocked-out of Europe and suffered consecutive away losses. Despite winning at home, Benfica had only one win on the road over the course of half a season. They sat in fourth place with a six-point deficit to Sporting. In the second part of the campaign, Benfica regained four points in two match-days, which included a 5–1 win over them. By January, Benfica closed the gap to one point, but a 4–0 loss against Porto stopped them. After a slow February; in March, Benfica caught Sporting at the front and in April, overtook them, after they lost to Porto. On 25 April, Benfica confirmed their 18th league title with Artur Jorge as Bola de Prata. Benfica concluded the season with Taça de Portugal final, losing it to Sporting.

== Season summary ==
Benfica started the new season with the task of improving on troubled past season, where they lost the title to Sporting and had Estádio da Luz banned for part of the season for pitch invasion. Back-to-back league winner, Otto Glória had resigned and was replaced by José Augusto for the final months of the season. Alfredo Di Stéfano was approached to replace him, but the choice fell to Englishman, Jimmy Hagan, who arrived in Lisbon on 15 April. Hagan most notorious change was his rigidity and harsh training sessions. In the transfer window, Benfica lost Mário Coluna and Humberto Fernandes, both were part of the team for over 10 years and Coluna become a club legend. The only signing for the first team was António Barros, with the youth team, bringing in Shéu. The pre-season began on 28 July with the team travelling to Luanda for a tour. After a brief period in Portugal, on 17 August, Benfica embarked on another tour, in South-east Asia, where they played seven games in roughly two weeks. Due to the events of the past season, Benfica still had to play one game at Estádio Nacional.

The league campaign began on 13 September with home win against CUF. Three days later, Benfica faced Olimpija Ljubljana for the European Cup Winners' Cup and drew 1–1. In the first away match of the league, Benfica visited Estádio de Alvalade to play Sporting, bringing home his second 1–1 draw of the week. For the final league match of the month, Benfica returned to Estádio da Luz after a prolonged exile. They beat Boavista by 4–0 and reached first place, levelled on points with Sporting. Mid week, Benfica played host to Olimpija Ljubljana, winning 8–1 and qualifying for the second round. In October, the club performance dipped and they went three weeks without a win. First they drew nil-nil on the road against Vitória de Guimarães, followed by a 2–2 draw in the Clássico with Porto. On 21 October, Benfica hosted Vorwärts Berlin for the Cup Winners' Cup and beat them by 2–0. Four days later, Benfica concluded their three weeks without a win for the Primeira Divisão, with a third away draw, now with Belenenses. This left Benfica in second place, three points shy of leader Sporting. In the last match of October, Benfica responded to this dark spell with a 7–0 home win against Tirsense. On the 4 November, Benfica was knocked-out of Europe by Vorwärts Berlin on penalties, after a 2–0 loss during 120 minutes. On the opening league match of the month, Benfica won away against Barreirense, their first ever away win in the season. Still, the team remained uncompetitive on the road, losing for the first time in the league on 15 November in a visit to Farense. This put Benfica in fourth place with five points less than Sporting. In the following week, a home win against Leixões, while Sporting dropped points, cut Benfica's deficit to four points. However, a double from Vítor Baptista in the visit to Vitória de Setúbal, inflicted the team their second league loss of the campaign. Sporting had again a six-point lead over Benfica, who remained fourth. Benfica began December with a 3–0 win over Varzim and gained a point over Sporting. The first half of the season ended with an away draw against Académica de Coimbra, putting Benfica with six points less than Sporting at the turn of the season.

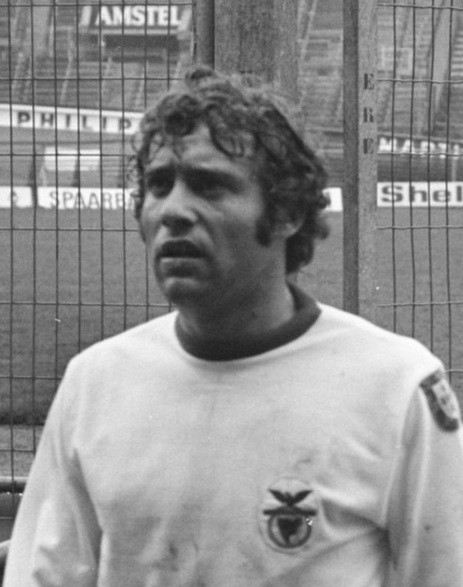
José Henrique played in all but ten minutes of the league campaign. João Fonseca replaced him in the final minutes of the last match.

Benfica began the second part of the campaign with an away win over CUF. Sporting lost so Benfica regained two points, right before meeting them. In the Lisbon derby, Benfica received and beat Sporting by 5–1 with a hat-trick from Artur Jorge. Jimmy Hagan described the win as "Speed, goals and football, plus an amazing Vítor Damas". Benfica was now with 21 points, two less than Sporting. They kept on winning and beat Boavista by 3–0 on the road. After a tour in South America in mid January, Benfica defeated Vitória de Guimarães at home and got within a point of Sporting, after they dropped points on the same day. On 31 January, Benfica visited Estádio das Antas and was surprised by 4–0 loss. This result kept Benfica in third place and saw Sporting reopen a three–point lead. In the opening match of February, Benfica beat Belenenses at home, while Sporting drew away, resetting the gap between them at two points. In the following two match-days, all of the Big Three won, so no changes occurred at the top of the table; Benfica beat Tirsense on the road and Barreinse in Estádio da Luz. On 21 March, Benfica defeated Farense at home by 5–0 and climbed to the top of table, taking advantage of a loss from Sporting and Porto draw. The win put Sporting and Benfica level on points. Benfica closed March with an away win over Leixões, with Porto losing and dropping out of race. This left Benfica and Sporting with a three–point lead and three match-days to go. On 4 April, Benfica beat Vitória de Setúbal at home and for the first time headed the league isolated, with a two-point lead. Sporting had lost with Porto. Three weeks later, Benfica confirmed their league title with an away win over Varzim. It was their 18th league title. They finished the Primeira Divisão with a 5–1 victory over Académica, ending the campaign with a three-point lead over Sporting, having won nine points over them in half a season. Artur Jorge was Bola de Prata with 24 goals. (Note: História de 50 anos do Desporto Português give it 23 goals to Artur Jorge, while Almanaque do Benfica and 100 anos 100 troféus give it 24.) The season concluded with Benfica and Sporting both qualifying for the Taça de Portugal final, with Sporting winning by 4–1. It was Sporting's first ever win against Benfica in the final of the Taça de Portugal.

== Competitions ==
Win Draw Loss Postponed

=== Overall record ===
| Competition | First match | Last match | Record | | | | | | | | |
| Competition | First match | Last match | G | W | D | L | GF | GA | GD | Win % | Source |
|---|---|---|---|---|---|---|---|---|---|---|---|
| Primeira Divisão | 13 September 1970 | 2 May 1971 | 26 | 18 | 5 | 3 | 62 | 17 | +45 | 69.23 | |
| Taça de Portugal | 16 May 1971 | 17 June 1971 | 7 | 6 | 0 | 1 | 35 | 7 | +28 | 85.71 | |
| European Cup Winners' Cup | 16 September 1970 | 4 November 1970 | 4 | 2 | 1 | 1 | 11 | 4 | +7 | 50.00 | |
| Total | | | 37 | 26 | 6 | 5 | 108 | 28 | +80 | 70.27 | |

=== Primeira Divisão ===
==== League table ====
| Pos | Team | Pld | W | D | L | GF | GA | GD | Pts | Qualification or relegation |
|---|---|---|---|---|---|---|---|---|---|---|
| 1 | Benfica (C) | 26 | 18 | 5 | 3 | 62 | 17 | +45 | 41 | Qualification to European Cup first round |
| 2 | Sporting CP | 26 | 16 | 6 | 4 | 45 | 14 | +31 | 38 | Qualification to Cup Winners' Cup first round (Note: Sporting qualified for the Cup Winners' Cup as winners of the 1971 Taça de Portugal Final) |
| 3 | Porto | 26 | 16 | 5 | 5 | 44 | 21 | +23 | 37 | Qualification to UEFA Cup first round |
| 4 | Vitória de Setúbal | 26 | 15 | 4 | 7 | 51 | 16 | +35 | 34 | Qualification to UEFA Cup first round |
| 5 | Académica | 26 | 13 | 7 | 6 | 38 | 24 | +14 | 33 | Qualification to UEFA Cup first round |

Source: RSSSF
(C) Champions

==== Results by round ====
| Round | 1 | 2 | 3 | 4 | 5 | 6 | 7 | 8 | 9 | 10 | 11 | 12 | 13 | 14 | 15 | 16 | 17 | 18 | 19 | 20 | 21 | 22 | 23 | 24 | 25 | 26 |
|---|---|---|---|---|---|---|---|---|---|---|---|---|---|---|---|---|---|---|---|---|---|---|---|---|---|---|
| Ground | H | A | H | A | H | A | H | A | A | H | A | H | A | A | H | A | H | A | H | A | H | H | A | H | A | H |
| Result | W | D | W | D | D | D | W | W | L | W | L | W | D | W | W | W | W | L | W | W | W | W | W | W | W | W |
| Position | 5 | 2 | 1 | 2 | 3 | 3 | 2 | 2 | 4 | 4 | 4 | 4 | 4 | 4 | 3 | 3 | 3 | 3 | 3 | 2 | 2 | 1 | 1 | 1 | 1 | 1 |

Source: ForaDeJogo
A = Away; H = Home; W = Win; D = Draw; L = Loss

==== Matches ====
| 13 September 1970 1 | Benfica | 1–0 | CUF | Oeiras |
| 18:00 | Eusébio 49' | Report | | Stadium: Estádio Nacional; Referee: Joaquim Freire |

| 20 September 1970 2 | Sporting | 1–1 | Benfica | Lisbon |
| 16:00 | Marinho 59' | Report | Artur Jorge 56' | Stadium: Estádio de Alvalade; Referee: Saldanha Ribeiro |

| 26 September 1970 3 | Benfica | 4–0 | Boavista | Lisbon |
| 17:00 | Artur Jorge 15', 24', 87'; José Torres 61' | Report | | Stadium: Estádio da Luz; Referee: Carlos Monteiro |

| 4 October 1970 4 | Vitória de Guimarães | 0–0 | Benfica | Guimarães |
| 18:00 | | Report | | Stadium: Estádio D. Afonso Henriques; Referee: Armando Paraty |

| 18 October 1970 5 | Benfica | 2–2 | Porto | Lisbon |
| 16:00 | José Torres 6'; Jaime Graça 67' | Report | Lemos 60', 88' | Stadium: Estádio da Luz; Referee: Ismael Baltasar |

| 25 October 1970 6 | Belenenses | 1–1 | Benfica | Lisbon |
| 16:00 | Estevão 48' (pen.) | Report | Eusébio 73' | Stadium: Estádio do Restelo; Referee: Francisco Lobo |

| 31 October 1970 7 | Benfica | 7–0 | Tirsense | Lisbon |
| 15:00 | Artur Jorge 4', 13', 51'; Nené 20'; Festa 49' (o.g.); Jaime Graça 69'; Raul Águas 83' | Report | | Stadium: Estádio da Luz; Referee: César Correia |

| 8 November 1970 8 | Barreirense | 0–2 | Benfica | Barreiro |
| 16:00 | | Report | Humberto Coelho 30'; Artur Jorge 44' | Stadium: Campo D. Manuel de Melo; Referee: João Gomes |

| 15 November 1970 9 | Farense | 1–0 | Benfica | Faro |
| 16:00 | Mário Nunes 89' | Report | | Stadium: Estádio de São Luís; Referee: António Espanhol |

| 22 November 1970 10 | Benfica | 5–0 | Leixões | Lisbon |
| 16:00 | Jaime Graça 24'; Artur Jorge 48', 73', 80'; Nené 58' | Report | | Stadium: Estádio da Luz; Referee: Porfírio Silva |

| 29 November 1970 11 | Vitória de Setúbal | 2–0 | Benfica | Setúbal |
| 16:00 | Vítor Baptista 25', 33' | Report | | Stadium: Estádio do Bonfim; Referee: Mário Alves |

| 5 December 1970 12 | Benfica | 3–0 | Varzim | Lisbon |
| 16:00 | Eusébio 33', 36'; Artur Jorge 85' | Report | | Stadium: Estádio da Luz; Referee: Ernesto Borrego |

| 13 December 1970 13 | Académica de Coimbra | 0–0 | Benfica | Coimbra |
| 17:00 | | Report | | Stadium: Estádio Municipal de Coimbra; Referee: António Garrido |

| 20 December 1970 14 | CUF | 0–2 | Benfica | Barreiro |
| 18:00 | | Report | Eusébio 44', 58' | Stadium: Complexo Desportivo Alfredo da Silva; Referee: César Correia |

| 27 December 1970 15 | Benfica | 5–1 | Sporting | Lisbon |
| 16:00 | Eusébio 24'; Artur Jorge 31', 57', 90'; Nené 50' | Report | José Carlos 70' (pen.) | Stadium: Estádio da Luz; Referee: Fernando Leite |

| 1 January 1971 16 | Boavista | 0–3 | Benfica | Porto |
| 15:00 | | Report | Eusébio 10', 51'; Artur Jorge 60' | Stadium: Estádio do Bessa; Referee: Manuel Fortunato |

| 24 January 1971 17 | Benfica | 1–0 | Vitória de Guimarães | Lisbon |
| 15:00 | Eusébio 63' (pen.) | Report | | Stadium: Estádio da Luz; Referee: João Calado |

| 31 January 1971 18 | Porto | 4–0 | Benfica | Porto |
| 17:00 | Lemos 20', 46', 54', 87' | Report | | Stadium: Estádio das Antas; Referee: António Garrido |

| 7 February 1971 19 | Benfica | 3–1 | Belenenses | Lisbon |
| 15:00 | Artur Jorge 27'; Eusébio 70'; Vítor Martins 79' | Report | Ernesto 60' | Stadium: Estádio da Luz; Referee: Mário Alves |

| 21 February 1971 20 | Tirsense | 2–4 | Benfica | Santo Tirso |
| 16:00 | António Luís 8'; Mário Espingardeiro 31' | Report | Eusébio 44', 47'; Humberto Coelho 62'; Artur Jorge 83' | Stadium: Estádio Abel Alves de Figueiredo; Referee: Porfírio Silva |

| 28 February 1971 21 | Benfica | 1–0 | Barreirense | Lisbon |
| 16:00 | Eusébio 16' | Report | | Stadium: Estádio da Luz; Referee: Joaquim Freire |

| 21 March 1971 22 | Benfica | 5–0 | Farense | Lisbon |
| 16:00 | Eusébio 2' (pen.), 68'; Artur Jorge 30'; Diamantino Costa 60'; Humberto Coelho 78' | Report | | Stadium: Estádio da Luz; Referee: Rogério Moreira |

| 28 March 1971 23 | Leixões | 1–2 | Benfica | Matosinhos |
| 15:00 | Esteves 26' | Report | Artur Jorge 45'; Vítor Martins 64' | Stadium: Estádio do Mar; Referee: João Calado |

| 4 April 1971 24 | Benfica | 1–0 | Vitória de Setúbal | Lisbon |
| 16:00 | Eusébio 16' | Report | | Stadium: Estádio da Luz; Referee: António Garrido |

| 25 April 1971 25 | Varzim | 0–4 | Benfica | Póvoa de Varzim |
| 15:00 | | Report | Eusébio 15'; Artur Jorge 69', 77'; Nené 71' | Stadium: Estádio do Varzim SC; Referee: Saldanha Ribeiro |

| 2 May 1971 26 | Benfica | 5–1 | Académica de Coimbra | Lisbon |
| 15:00 | Eusébio 9'; Nené 16', 61'; Artur Jorge 79', 88' | Report | | Stadium: Estádio da Luz; Attendance: 70,000; Referee: Fernando Leite |

=== Taça de Portugal ===
| 16 May 1971 Fifth Rd | Benfica | 11–0 | Luso FC | Lisbon |
| | Artur Jorge 1', 29', 34'; Torres 30', 49', 84'; Diamantino 56', 64', 85'; Eusébio 68'; Toni 87' | | | Stadium: Estádio da Luz; Referee: Manuel Fortunato |

| 22 May 1971 Round of 16 | Barreirense | 1–7 | Benfica | Barreiro |
| | Farías 37' | | Eusébio 30'; Artur Jorge 33', 85'; Nené 52', 57'; Vítor Martins 62'; Simões 72' | Stadium: Campo D. Manuel de Melo; Referee: Porfírio Silva |

==== Quarter-finals ====
| 30 May 1971 First leg | Benfica | 6–0 | Independente FC | Lisbon |
| | Eusébio 49' (pen.), 58', 62', 72'; Artur Jorge 80' | | | Stadium: Estádio da Luz; Referee: Ismael Baltasar |

| 4 June 1971 Second Leg | Independente FC | 0–2 (0–8 agg.) | Benfica | Marvila |
| | | | Torres 7'; Artur Jorge 35' | Stadium: Campo Engenheiro Carlos Salema; Referee: Francisco Lobo |

==== Semi-finals ====
| 10 June 1971 First leg | Tirsense | 1–3 | Benfica | Santo Tirso |
| | Amaral 7' | | Artur Jorge 27', 30'; Torres 71' | Stadium: Estádio Abel Alves de Figueiredo; Referee: António Espanhol |

| 15 June 1971 Second leg | Benfica | 5–1 (8–2 agg.) | Tirsense | Lisbon |
| | Artur Jorge 32', 46', 87'; Eusébio 53'; Torres 90' | | António Luís 88' | Stadium: Estádio da Luz; Referee: Manuel Fortunato |

==== Final ====
| 27 June 1971 Final | Sporting | 4–1 | Benfica | Oeiras |
| | Dinis 5'; Fernandes 23'; Faria 33', 77' | | Eusébio 59' (pen.) | Stadium: Estádio Nacional; Referee: Francisco Lobo |

=== European Cup Winners' Cup ===
==== First round ====
| 16 September 1970 First leg | Olimpija Ljubljana (Socialist Federal Republic of Yugoslavia) | 1–1 | (Portugal) Benfica | Ljubljana |
| 19:30 | Pejović 55' | | Eusébio 30' | Stadium: Bežigrad Stadium; Referee: Paul Bonett |

| 30 September 1970 Second leg | Benfica (Portugal) | 8–1 (9–2 agg.) | (Socialist Federal Republic of Yugoslavia) Olimpija Ljubljana | Lisbon |
| 21:45 | Eusébio 26', 30', 32', 71', 80'; Zeca 47'; Artur Jorge 67'; Jaime Graça 75' | | Ameršek 48' | Stadium: Estádio da Luz; Referee: Antoine Queudeville |

==== Second round ====
| 21 October 1970 First leg | Benfica (Portugal) | 2–0 | (East Germany) Vorwärts Berlin | Lisbon |
| 21:45 | Eusébio 3'; Diamantino Costa 66' | | | Stadium: Estádio da Luz; Referee: Lajos Horvath |

| 4 November 1970 Second leg | Vorwärts Berlin (East Germany) | 2–0 (a.e.t.) (5–3 p) | (Portugal) Benfica | Berlin |
| 18:30 | Horst Wruck 24'; Fräßdorf 67' | | | Stadium: Friedrich-Ludwig-Jahn-Sportpark; Attendance: 10,533; Referee: John Adair |
| | Penalties |
| | Heinz Dietzsch (penalty scored); Körner (penalty scored); Nöldner (penalty scored); Fräßdorf (penalty scored); Wolfgang Strübing (penalty scored) | | (penalty scored) Artur Jorge; (penalty missed) Vítor Martins; (penalty scored) Toni; (penalty scored) Raul Águas |

=== Friendlies ===
| 2 August 1970 | Benfica | 2–1 | Vitória de Setúbal | Luanda |
| | Eusébio (pen.); Torres 83' | | Joaquim Arcanjo 44' | Stadium: Estádio dos Coqueiros; Referee: Mónica Serra |

| 5 August 1970 | Luanda XI | 1–9 | Benfica | Luanda |
| | Quim | | Raul Águas; Artur Jorge; Nené; Eusébio | Stadium: Estádio dos Coqueiros; Referee: Pinto Fernandes |

| 9 August 1970 | Benfica | 2–0 | Vitória de Setúbal | Matola |
| | Eusébio 20'; Torres 43' | | | Stadium: Estádio da Machava; Referee: Abel Basto |

| 20 August 1970 | Macau | 0–4 | Benfica | Macau |
| | | | Artur Jorge; Eusébio | Stadium: 28 May Stadium |

| 22 August 1970 | Hong Kong | 0–7 | Benfica | Hong Kong |
| | | | Nené 7', 55'; Eusébio 23', 42'; Artur Jorge 28', 33'; Augusto Matine 67' | Stadium: Hong Kong Stadium |

| 25 August 1970 | Japan | 0–3 | Benfica | Kobe |
| | | | Eusébio; Artur Jorge; Nené | Stadium: Kobe Central Stadium |

| 28 August 1970 | Japan | 1–4 | Benfica | Tokyo |
| | | | Eusébio 13', 15', 19', 71' | Stadium: National Stadium; Attendance: 50,000 |

| 1 September 1970 | Japan | 1–6 | Benfica | Tokyo |
| | Koji Mari 24' | | Torres 38'; Eusébio 43'; Nené; Jaime Graça; Augusto Matine | Stadium: National Stadium; Referee: Negashima |

| 3 September 1970 | South Korea B | 0–5 | Benfica | Seoul |
| | | | Eusébio; Torres; Nené | Stadium: Hyochang Stadium |

| 5 September 1970 | South Korea | 1–1 | Benfica | Seoul |
| | Lee Hoe-taik 68' | | Eusébio 82' | Stadium: Hyochang Stadium |

| 11 November 1970 | Rennes | 0–2 | Benfica | Paris |
| | | | Jaime Graça 22'; Nené 55' | Stadium: Stade Olympique Yves-du-Manoir; Attendance: 25,000; Referee: Roger Marchand |

| 8 December 1970 Coluna Tstmonial | Benfica | 3–2 | Europe XI | Lisbon |
| | Eusébio 31'; António Simões 43'; Artur Jorge | | Seeler 46'; Gárate | Stadium: Estádio da Luz; Referee: Joaquim Campos |

| 13 January 1971 | Palmeiras | 1–1 | Benfica | São Paulo |
| | César Maluco 51' | | Artur Jorge 75' | Stadium: Pacaembu Stadium |

| 15 January 1971 | Alianza – Municipal XI | 1–2 | Benfica | Lima |
| | | | Eusébio; António Simões |

| 17 January 1971 | Atlético | 4–2 | Benfica | Medellín |
| | Escobar 8'; Santa 53'; Malta da Silva (o.g.); Tamayo | | Artur Jorge 43', 65' | Stadium: Atanasio Girardot Sports Complex |

| 6 March 1971 Taça de Honra | Belenenses | 1–0 | Benfica | Lisbon |
| | José Camolas 70' | | | Stadium: Estádio do Restelo; Referee: Manuel Amiguinho |

| 7 March 1971 Taça de Honra | Atlético | 2–1 | Benfica | Lisbon |
| | | | | Stadium: Estádio José Alvalade; Referee: César Reigadas |

| 12 March 1971 | Persapolis | 0–4 | Benfica | Tehran |
| | | | Eusébio; Artur Jorge; Vítor Martins | Stadium: Azadi Stadium |

| 13 March 1971 | PAS Tehran | 0–2 | Benfica | Tehran |
| | | | António Simões 36'; Diamantino Costa 70' | Stadium: Azadi Stadium |

| 7 April 1971 | Benfica | 3–0 | Kickers Offenbach | Lisbon |
| | Raul Águas 20'; Torres 45', 71' | | | Stadium: Estádio da Luz; Referee: Américo Barrada |

| 12 April 1971 | Sporting | 3–1 | Benfica | Paris |
| | Fernando Tomé 47'; Faria 82'; Dinis 90' | | Jaime Graça 73' | Stadium: Stade Olympique Yves-du-Manoir |

== Player statistics ==
The squad for the season consisted of the players listed in the tables below, as well as staff member Jimmy Hagan (manager) and José Augusto (assistant manager).

Note 1: Note: Flags indicate national team as defined under FIFA eligibility rules. Players may hold more than one non-FIFA nationality.

Note 2: Players with squad numbers marked ‡ joined the club during the 1970-71 season via transfer, with more details in the following section.

| No. | Pos | Nat | Player | Total | | Primeira Divisão | | Taça de Portugal | | European Cup Winners' Cup | |
| No. | Pos | Nat | Player | Apps | Goals | Apps | Goals | Apps | Goals | Apps | Goals |
|---|---|---|---|---|---|---|---|---|---|---|---|
| 1 | GK | (Portugal) POR | José Henrique | 35 | 0 | 26 | 0 | 5 | 0 | 4 | 0 |
| 1 | GK | (Portugal) POR | João Fonseca | 3 | 0 | 1 | 0 | 2 | 0 | 0 | 0 |
| 2 | DF | (Portugal) POR | Adolfo Calisto | 27 | 0 | 19 | 0 | 7 | 0 | 1 | 0 |
| 3 | DF | (Portugal) POR | Amândio Malta da Silva | 33 | 0 | 22 | 0 | 7 | 0 | 4 | 0 |
| 3^{‡} | DF | (Portugal) POR | António Barros | 7 | 0 | 5 | 0 | 0 | 0 | 2 | 0 |
| 4 | DF | (Portugal) POR | Humberto Coelho | 36 | 3 | 25 | 3 | 7 | 0 | 4 | 0 |
| 4 | DF | (Portugal) POR | Marques | 2 | 0 | 2 | 0 | 0 | 0 | 0 | 0 |
| 4 | DF | (Portugal) POR | Jacinto Santos | 1 | 0 | 1 | 0 | 0 | 0 | 0 | 0 |
| 4 | DF | (Portugal) POR | Messias Timula | 3 | 0 | 1 | 0 | 2 | 0 | 0 | 0 |
| 5 | DF | (Portugal) POR | Zeca | 36 | 1 | 25 | 0 | 7 | 0 | 4 | 1 |
| 5 | DF | (Portugal) POR | Jaime Graça | 28 | 4 | 22 | 3 | 2 | 0 | 4 | 1 |
| 6 | MF | (Portugal) POR | Augusto Matine | 24 | 0 | 15 | 0 | 6 | 0 | 3 | 0 |
| 6 | MF | (Portugal) POR | Toni | 20 | 1 | 15 | 0 | 2 | 1 | 3 | 0 |
| 6 | MF | (Portugal) POR | Armando Vieira | 1 | 0 | 0 | 0 | 1 | 0 | 0 | 0 |
| 7 | FW | (Portugal) POR | Nené | 29 | 9 | 21 | 6 | 6 | 3 | 2 | 0 |
| 7 | FW | (Portugal) POR | Praia | 3 | 0 | 2 | 0 | 1 | 0 | 0 | 0 |
| 8 | MF | (Portugal) POR | Jorge Calado | 9 | 0 | 8 | 0 | 0 | 0 | 1 | 0 |
| 8 | MF | (Portugal) POR | Vítor Martins | 23 | 3 | 17 | 2 | 3 | 1 | 3 | 0 |
| 9 | FW | (Portugal) POR | José Torres | 16 | 7 | 10 | 2 | 4 | 5 | 2 | 0 |
| 9 | FW | (Portugal) POR | Raul Águas | 3 | 1 | 2 | 1 | 0 | 0 | 1 | 0 |
| 9 | FW | (Portugal) POR | Artur Jorge | 37 | 37 | 26 | 24 | 7 | 12 | 4 | 1 |
| 10 | FW | (Portugal) POR | Eusébio | 32 | 35 | 22 | 19 | 7 | 9 | 3 | 7 |
| 11 | MF | (Portugal) POR | Diamantino Costa | 22 | 5 | 13 | 1 | 7 | 3 | 2 | 1 |
| 11 | MF | (Portugal) POR | António Simões | 26 | 1 | 19 | 0 | 5 | 1 | 2 | 0 |

== Transfers ==
=== In ===
| Entry date | Position | Player | From club | Fee | Ref |
|---|---|---|---|---|---|
| 14 June 1970 | DF | António Barros | Leixões | Undisclosed | |

=== Out ===
| Exit date | Position | Player | To club | Fee | Ref |
|---|---|---|---|---|---|
| 10 May 1970 | FW | Abel Miglietti | Porto | Undisclosed | |
| 11 May 1970 | DF | Humberto Fernandes | Estrela de Portalegre | Free | |
| 11 May 1970 | DF | Fernandes | União de Tomar | Free | |
| 11 May 1970 | GK | Nascimento | União de Tomar | Free | |
| 24 July 1970 | MF | Mário Coluna | Lyon | Free | |
| 8 August 1970 | DF | Antoninho | Boavista | Free | |
| 8 August 1970 | DF | Fernando Cruz | Paris Saint-Germain | Free | |
| 1 September 1970 | MF | Jaime Pavão | União de Tomar | Free | |

=== Out by loan ===
| Exit date | Position | Player | To club | Return date | Ref |
|---|---|---|---|---|---|
| 1 May 1971 | GK | José Henrique | Toronto Metros | 30 July 1971 | |
