= 1971 Taça de Portugal final =

- Event: 1970–71 Taça de Portugal
Benfica	Sporting CP
1	4
- Date: 27 June 1971
- Venue: Estádio Nacional, Oeiras
- Referee: Francisco Lobo (Setúbal)

The 1971 Taça de Portugal final was the final match of the 1970–71 Taça de Portugal, the 31st season of the Taça de Portugal, the premier Portuguese football cup competition organized by the Portuguese Football Federation (FPF). The match was played on 27 June 1971 at the Estádio Nacional in Oeiras, and opposed two Primeira Liga sides: Benfica and Sporting CP. Sporting CP defeated Benfica 4–1 to claim a seventh Taça de Portugal.

== Match ==
=== Details ===
27 June 1971

Benfica	1–4	Sporting CP
Eusébio 59' (pen.)		Dinis 5'; Fernandes 23'; Faria 33', 71'

Estádio Nacional, Oeiras
Referee: Francisco Lobo (Setúbal)

Benfica	Sporting CP

GK	1	(Portugal) José Henrique
DF	(Portugal) Malta da Silva
DF	(Portugal) Zeca
DF	(Portugal) Augusto Matine	(substituted off) 34'
DF	(Portugal) Adolfo Calisto
DF	(Portugal) Humberto Coelho
MF	(Portugal) António Simões (c)
MF	(Portugal) Jaime Graça
FW	(Portugal) Eusébio
FW	(Portugal) Artur Jorge	(substituted off) 69'
FW	(Portugal) Nené
Substitutes:
MF	(Portugal) Diamantino Costa	(substituted on) 34'
FW	(Portugal) José Torres	(substituted on) 69'
Manager:
(England) Jimmy Hagan

GK	1	(Portugal) Vítor Damas
DF	(Portugal) Manaca
DF	(Portugal) Pedro Gomes (c)
DF	(Portugal) João Laranjeira
DF	(Portugal) José Carlos	(substituted off) 68'
MF	(Portugal) Fernando Peres
MF	(Portugal) Nélson Fernandes
MF	(Portugal) Vítor Gonçalves	(substituted off) 57'
MF	(Portugal) Marinho
FW	(Portugal) Joaquim Dinis
FW	(Portugal) Chico Faria
Substitutes:
DF	(Portugal) Francisco Caló	(substituted on) 68'
MF	(Portugal) Fernando Tomé	(substituted on) 57'
Manager:
(Portugal) Fernando Vaz

1970–71 Taça de Portugal Winners
Sporting CP
7th Title

Match officials

- Assistant referees:
- Fourth official:

Match rules

- 90 minutes.
- 30 minutes of extra time if necessary.

== See also ==
- Derby de Lisboa
- 1970–71 S.L. Benfica season
