= 1969–70 S.L. Benfica season =

Benfica
1969–70 season
- President: Duarte Borges Coutinho
- Head coach: Otto Glória (until 8 February 1970); José Augusto
- Stadium: Estádio da Luz
- Primeira Divisão: 2nd
- Taça de Portugal: Winners
- European Cup: Second round
- Top goalscorer: League: Eusébio (20); All: Eusébio (25)
- Biggest win: Benfica 8–0 Boavista (25 October 1969); Benfica 8–0 Leixões (30 May 1970)
- Biggest defeat: Celtic 3–0 Benfica (12 November 1969)
Home colours	Away colours

The 1969–70 season was Sport Lisboa e Benfica's 66st season in existence and the club's 36st consecutive season in the top flight of Portuguese football, covering the period from 1 August 1969 to 31 July 1970. Domestically, Benfica competed in the Primeira Divisão and Taça de Portugal, while internationally participated in the European Cup.

Benfica began the season aiming for a fourth consecutive league title under Otto Glória, but inconsistent results and a mid-season managerial change left the team trailing Sporting, who won the championship. In Europe, Benfica were eliminated by Celtic after a coin toss in the second round of the European Cup. The season ended on a high note, however, as Benfica won the Taça de Portugal, defeating Sporting 3–1 in the final.

== Season summary ==
After winning the league title for the third consecutive year, Benfica aimed for a historic fourth straight championship (tetra), with Otto Glória as head coach. The squad was reinforced with Messias, Carlos Marques, and Artur Jorge, who had already scored 94 goals in 112 matches in Académica. Meanwhile, club legends Cavém and Raul Machado departed.

Pre-season began with a tour of Africa, where Benfica beat Racing 1–0 but lost twice to Sporting, 1–0 and 5–2. Later, in the Taça de Honra, Benfica defeated Atlético 2–1 in the semi-finals and drew 1–1 with Belenenses in the final

The official season opened on 7 September with a 2–0 away defeat to Leixões in the first league match. In the following three rounds, Benfica beat Vitória de Guimarães, Belenenses, and Académica, finishing the month two points behind Sporting. In Europe, Benfica eliminated KB 5–2 on aggregate.

In October, Benfica won both league matches, beating CUF 2–0 away and Boavista 8–0 at home. November began with a 1–0 defeat to Sporting, followed by a 3–0 away loss to Celtic in the 1969–70 European Cup. The team responded with a 5–0 win over Braga, a 1–0 away loss to Vitória de Setúbal, and then the second leg against Celtic. Benfica won 3–0, leveling the tie, but with no goals scored in extra time, the outcome was decided by a coin toss. Celtic advanced and went on to reach the final.

In December, Benfica won three league matches and drew one, including a 2–0 home victory against Porto, finishing the first half of the season three points behind Sporting. The new year began with a 3–0 win over Leixões, followed by a 2–1 away defeat to Vitória de Guimarães and a 0–0 draw against Belenenses, leaving Benfica six points adrift of Sporting.

February was disappointing, as Benfica beat Académica 2–0 away but then lost 1–0 at home to CUF. This defeat led to the dismissal of Otto Glória, with José Augusto retiring as a player to take over as manager. The month ended with a 1–1 away draw against Boavista, which left Benfica in third place, eight points behind the leaders. In March, the team drew 1–1 with Sporting in Alvalade, before recording three consecutive wins over Braga, Vitória de Setúbal, and União de Tomar, maintaining the gap at eight points. In the Taça de Portugal, Benfica overturned a 3–2 away defeat to eliminate Vitória de Setúbal with a 2–0 home victory.

In April, Benfica won all of its league matches: 3–0 against Barreirense at home, 2–1 away against Porto, and 1–0 against Varzim at home. The team also secured a 6–1 victory over Boavista in the first leg of the second round of the Taça de Portugal. Benfica ended the league campaign eight points behind Sporting.

In the Taça de Portugal, Benfica defeated Boavista 3–2 away in the second leg, eliminated Vitória de Guimarães 4–3 on aggregate, and overcame Leixões 9–1 on aggregate to reach the final. There, they faced recently crowned league champions Sporting and won 3–1.

== Competitions ==
Win Draw Loss Postponed

=== Overall record ===
Competition	First match	Last match	Record								
Competition	First match	Last match	G	W	D	L	GF	GA	GD	Win %	Source
Primeira Divisão	7 September 1969	19 April 1970	26	17	4	5	58	14	+44	65.38	
Taça de Portugal	15 February 1970	14 June 1970	9	6	1	2	29	11	+18	66.67	
European Cup	17 September 1969	26 November 1969	4	3	0	1	8	5	+3	75.00	
Total			39	26	5	8	95	30	+65	66.67	

== League standings ==
Pos	Team	Pld	W	D	L	GF	GA	GD	Pts	Qualification or relegation
1	Sporting CP (C)	26	21	4	1	61	17	+44	46	Qualification to European Cup first round
2	Benfica	26	17	4	5	58	14	+44	38	Qualification to Cup Winners' Cup first round
3	Vitória de Setúbal	26	16	4	6	58	26	+32	36	Qualification to Inter-Cities Fairs Cup first round
4	Barreirense	26	11	6	9	42	33	+9	28	Qualification to Inter-Cities Fairs Cup first round
5	Vitória de Guimarães	26	12	4	10	38	36	+2	28	Qualification to Inter-Cities Fairs Cup first round

Source: RSSSF
(C) Champions

=== Matches ===
7 September 1969 1	Leixões	2–0	Benfica	Matosinhos
15:00	Horácio 60'; Esteves 70'			Stadium: Estádio do Mar; Referee: Porfírio Silva

14 September 1969 2	Benfica	5–0	Vitória de Guimarães	Lisbon
	Diamantino Costa 6'; Torres 34', 49', 89'; Jaime Graça 68'			Stadium: Estádio da Luz; Referee: Ismael Baltazar

21 September 1970 3	Benfica	0–1	Benfica	Belém
			Eusébio 53'	Stadium: Estádio do Restelo; Referee: Américo Barradas

27 September 1969 4	Benfica	3–0	Académica	Lisbon
	Torres 22', 68'; Eusébio 28'			Stadium: Estádio da Luz

19 October 1969 5	CUF	0–2	Benfica	Barreiro
			Torres 16'; Artur Jorge 89'	Stadium: Estádio Alfredo da Silva; Referee: Mário Alves

25 October 1969 6	Benfica	8–0	Boavista	Lisbon
	Eusébio 10', 17', 46', 52', 54', 81'; Coluna 35'; Torres 40'			Stadium: Estádio da Luz; Referee: Carlos Monteiro

9 November 1969 7	Sporting	1–0	Benfica	Lisbon
	Marinho 20'			Stadium: Estádio José Alvalade; Referee: Francisco Lobo

16 November 1969 8	Benfica	5–0	Braga	Lisbon
	Torres 8', 24'; Raul Águas 22'; Artur Jorge 62', 86'			Stadium: Estádio da Luz; Referee: António Garrido

23 November 1969 9	Vitória de Setúbal	1–0	Benfica	Setúbal
	Félix Guerreiro 57'			Stadium: Estádio do Bonfim; Referee: César Correia

1 December 1969 10	S.L. Benfica	6–0	União de Tomar	Lisbon
	João Carlos 4' (o.g.); Simões 11'; Raul Águas 32' (pen.); Faustino Luís 43' (o.g.); Jaime Graça 76'; Vítor Martins 87			Stadium: Estádio da Luz; Referee: Ismael Baltazar

14 December 1969 11	Barreirense	2–2	Benfica	Barreiro
	Farias 14'; João Fonseca 32' (o.g.)		Torres 23'; Eusébio 87'	Stadium: Estádio D. Manuel de Mello; Referee: Fernando Leite

21 December 1969 12	Benfica	2–0	Porto	Lisbon
	Simões 6'; Eusébio 27'			Stadium: Estádio da Luz; Referee: Mário Alves

28 December 1969 13	Varzim	0–1	Benfica	Póvoa de Varzim
	Artur Jorge 13'

4 January 1970 14	Benfica	3–0	Leixões	Lisbon
	Eusébio 12'; Torres 49', 81'			Stadium: Estádio da Luz

18 January 1970 15	Vitória de Guimarães	2–1	Benfica	Guimarães
	Zézinho 34'; Manuel de Sousa 40'		Abel Miglietti 71'	Stadium: Estádio D. Afonso Henriques

25 January 1970 16	Belenenses	0–0	Benfica	Belém
				Stadium: Estádio do Restelo

1 February 1970 17	Académica	0–2	Benfica	Coimbra
			Artur Jorge 39'; Eusébio 75'

8 February 1970 18	Benfica	0–1	CUF	Lisbon
			Madeira 8'	Stadium: Estádio da Luz

22 February 1970 19	Boavista	1–1	Benfica	Porto
	Moura 41'		Eusébio 79'	Stadium: Estádio do Bessa

1 March 1970 20	Benfica	1–1	Sporting	Lisbon
	Jaime Graça 83'		Nélson Fernandes 29'	Stadium: Estádio da Luz; Referee: Henrique Silva

8 March 1970 21	Braga	1–3	Benfica	Braga
	João Arlindo 22'		Raul Águas 17'; Eusébio 19', 34'	Stadium: Estádio 28 de Maio; Referee: Antonio Saldanha Ribeiro

15 March 1970 22	Benfica	2–1	Vitória de Setúbal	Lisbon
	Torres 65'; Eusébio 89' (pen.)		Jorge Calado 4' (o.g.)	Stadium: Estádio da Luz; Referee: Fernando Nunes dos Santos Leite

29 March 1970 23	Uniao de Tomar	0–4	Benfica	Tomar
			Artur Jorge 34'; Eusébio 42', 73', 79'

5 April 1970 24	Benfica	3–0	Barreirense	Lisbon
	Artur Jorge 65'; Jaime Graça 67'; Eusébio 76'			Stadium: Estádio da Luz

12 April 1970 25	Porto	1–2	Benfica	Porto
	João 76'		Simões 6'; Artur Jorge 24'	Stadium: Estádio das Antas; Referee: Rogério Moreira

19 April 1970 26	Benfica	1–0	Varzim	Lisbon
	Artur Jorge 27'			Stadium: Estádio da Luz; Referee: Saldanha Ribeiro

=== Taça de Portugal ===
==== First round ====
15 February 1970; First leg	Vitória de Settúbal	2–3	Benfica	Setubal
	Arcanjo 32'; Vítor Baptista 40', 80'		Jaime Graça 53'; Simões 85'	Stadium: Estádio do Bonfim

22 March 1970; Second leg	Benfica	2–0 (4–3 agg.)	Vitória de Settúbal	Lisbon
	Torres 59'; Eusébio 84'			Stadium: Estádio da Luz

==== Second round ====
26 April 1970; First leg	Benfica	6–1	Boavista	Lisbon
	Artur Jorge 24', 26', 39'; Vítor Martins 58'; Jaime Graça 65'; Torres 81'		Moinhos 8'	Stadium: Estádio da Luz; Referee: Ismael Baltazar

3 May 1970; Second leg	Boavista	2–3	Benfica	Porto
	António Lemos 17'; Manuel Pinha 65'		Artur Jorge 7', 11', 19'	Stadium: Estádio do Bessa; Referee: António Garrido

==== Quarter-Finals ====
17 May 1970; First leg	Vitória de Guimarães	2–0	Benfica	Guimarães
	Zézinho 3'; Osvaldinho 59'			Stadium: Estádio D. Afonso Henriques; Referee: João Gomes

24 May 1970; Second leg	Benfica	4–1 (4–3 agg.)	Vitória de Guimarães	Lisbon
	Simões 22' (pen.), 56' (pen.); Torres 40', 68'		Zézinho 60'	Stadium: Estádio da Luz; Referee: Francisco Lobo

==== Semi-Finals ====
30 May 1970; First leg	Benfica	8–0	Leixões	Lisbon
	Torres 13'; Simões 16'; Diamantino Costa 30'; Artur Jorge 35', 59'; Raul Águas 79', 88'; Jaime Graça 81'			Stadium: Estádio da Luz; Referee: Manuel Fortunato

7 June 1970; Second leg	Leixões	1–1 (1–9 agg.)	Benfica	Matosinhos
			Diamantino Costa 43'	Stadium: Estádio do Mar; Referee: Ernesto Borrego

==== Final ====
14 June 1970	Benfica	3–1	Sporting	Oeiras
	Artur Jorge 14'; Torres 50'; Simões 63'		Fernando Peres 83'	Stadium: Estádio do Jamor; Referee: Henrique Silva

=== European Cup ===
==== First Round ====
17 September 1969; First leg	Benfica (Portugal)	2–0	(Denmark) Kjøbenhavns Boldklub	Estádio da Luz, Lisbon
	Eusébio 39', 40'	Report		Attendance: 35,928; Referee: Robert Héliès (France)

1 October 1969; Second leg	Kjøbenhavns Boldklub (Denmark)	2–3 (5–2 agg.)	(Portugal) Benfica	Københavns Idrætspark, Copenhagen
	Skouborg 30', 90' (pen.)	Report	Eusébio 1', 21'; Diamantino 4'	Attendance: 31,528; Referee: Ronald Jones (Wales)

==== Second Round ====
12 November 1969; First leg	Celtic (Scotland)	3–0	(Portugal) Benfica	Celtic Park, Glasgow
	Gemmell 2'; Wallace 14'; Hood 70'	Report		Attendance: 74,894; Referee: Concetto Lo Bello (Italy)

26 November 1969; Second leg	Benfica (Portugal)	3–0 (a.e.t.)	(Scotland) Celtic	Estádio da Luz, Lisbon
	Eusébio 35'; Graça 40'; Diamantino 90'	Report		Attendance: 49,601; Referee: Laurens van Ravens (Netherlands)

After the 3–3 aggregate on extra-time, Celtic progressed on a coin toss.

=== Friendlies ===
2 August 1969	Benfica	1–0	Racing	Matola
	Praia			Stadium: Estádio da Machava

6 August 1969	Benfica	0–1	Sporting	Matola
				Stadium: Estádio da Machava

15 August 1969	Benfica	2–5	Sporting	Luanda
	Torres			Stadium: Estádio dos Coqueiros

27 August 1969; Taça de Honra; Semi-Finals	Benfica	2–1	Atlético	Belém
	Raúl Águas 44', 50'		Raimundo	Stadium: Estádio do Restelo

2 September 1969	Porto	0–3	Benfica	Porto
			Torres; Augusto	Stadium: Estádio das Antas

3 September 1969; Taça de Honra; Finals	Belenenses	1–1	Benfica	Belém
	Abel Miglietti 41'		Saporiti 58'	Stadium: Estádio do Restelo

7 December 1969	Benfica	3–1	Académica	Torres Novas
				Stadium: Estadio Municipal Dr. António Alves Vieira

11 January 1970	Benfica	5–0	Rapid Wien	Lisbon
			Eusébio; Torres; Abel Miglietti	Stadium: Estádio da Luz

21 April 1970	Dinamo Zagreb	2–0	Benfica	Zagreb
				Stadium: Stadion Maksimir

23 April 1970	Hajduk Split	1–1	Benfica	Split
	Torres 35'			Stadium: Stari plac

== Player statistics ==
The squad for the season consisted of the players listed in the tables below, as well as staff member Otto Glória (manager), José Augusto (manager), Fernando Cabrita (assistant manager).

Note 1: Note: Flags indicate national team as defined under FIFA eligibility rules. Players may hold more than one non-FIFA nationality.

Note 2: Players with squad numbers marked ‡ joined the club during the 1969–70 season via transfer, with more details in the following section.

No.	Pos	Nat	Player	Total		Primeira Divisão		Taça de Portugal		European Cup	
No.	Pos	Nat	Player	Apps	Goals	Apps	Goals	Apps	Goals	Apps	Goals
1	GK	(Portugal) POR	Alfredo Nascimento	2	0	1	0	0	0	1	0
1	GK	(Portugal) POR	José Henrique	32	0	19	0	9	0	4	0
1	GK	(Portugal) POR	João Fonseca	8	0	8	0	0	0	0	0
	DF	(Portugal) POR	Augusto Matine	17	0	8	0	9	0	0	0
	DF	(Portugal) POR	Carlos Marques	7	0	3	0	4	0	0	0
	MF	(Portugal) POR	Carlos Tomás	1	0	0	0	1	0	0	0
	DF	(Portugal) POR	Fernando Cruz	1	0	1	0	0	0	0	0
	DF	(Portugal) POR	Jacinto	22	0	16	0	5	0	1	0
2	DF	(Portugal) POR	Malta da Silva	33	0	22	0	7	0	4	0
3	MF	(Portugal) POR	Humberto Coelho	37	0	25	0	9	0	3	0
3	DF	(Portugal) POR	Messias	3	0	2	0	0	0	1	0
4	DF	(Portugal) POR	Zeca	27	0	16	0	8	0	3	0
5	MF	(Portugal) POR	Humberto Fernandes	2	0	0	0	1	0	1	0
5	DF	(Portugal) POR	Adolfo Calisto	19	0	14	0	2	0	3	0
	MF	(Portugal) POR	Antoninho	1	0	0	0	1	0	0	0
	DF	(Portugal) POR	Diamantino Costa	16	6	8	1	4	2	4	3
	MF	(Portugal) POR	Jorge Calado	5	0	4	0	1	0	0	0
	MF	(Portugal) POR	Vitor Martins	9	2	4	1	4	1	1	0
6	MF	(Portugal) POR	Jaime Graça	33	8	23	4	7	3	3	1
7	MF	(Portugal) POR	Mário Coluna	19	1	15	1	0	0	4	0
7	FW	(Portugal) POR	José Augusto	7	0	5	0	0	0	2	0
8	MF	(Portugal) POR	Toni	35	0	26	0	6	0	3	0
9	FW	(Portugal) POR	Artur Jorge	31	18	21	9	8	9	2	0
9	FW	(Portugal) POR	José Torres	29	19	20	13	6	6	3	0
9	FW	(Portugal) POR	Abel Miglietti	8	1	7	1	1	0	0	0
9	FW	(Portugal) POR	Praia	3	0	2	0	1	0	0	0
10	FW	(Portugal) POR	Eusébio	28	25	22	20	2	1	4	4
10	FW	(Portugal) POR	Raul Águas	15	5	10	3	4	2	1	0
11	FW	(Portugal) POR	Nené	2	0	1	0	1	0	0	0
11	FW	(Portugal) POR	António Simões	34	8	23	3	7	5	4	0
