= 1970 Taça de Portugal final =

- Event: 1969–70 Taça de Portugal
Benfica	Sporting CP
3	1
- Date: 14 June 1970
- Venue: Estádio Nacional, Oeiras
- Referee: Henrique Silva (Lisbon)

The 1970 Taça de Portugal final was the final match of the 1969–70 Taça de Portugal, the 30th season of the Taça de Portugal, the premier Portuguese football cup competition organized by the Portuguese Football Federation (FPF). The match was played on 14 June 1970 at the Estádio Nacional in Oeiras, and opposed two Primeira Liga sides: Benfica and Sporting CP. Benfica defeated Sporting CP 3–1 to claim a fourteenth Taça de Portugal.

== Match ==
=== Details ===
14 June 1970

Benfica	3–1	Sporting CP
Artur Jorge 14'; Torres 50'; Simões 63'		Peres 83'

Estádio Nacional, Oeiras
Referee: Henrique Silva (Lisbon)

Benfica	Sporting CP

GK	1	(Portugal) José Henrique
DF	(Portugal) Zeca
DF	(Portugal) Humberto Coelho
DF	(Portugal) Augusto Matine
DF	(Portugal) Malta da Silva (c)
MF	(Portugal) Jaime Graça
MF	(Portugal) António Simões
MF	(Portugal) Toni
MF	(Portugal) Diamantino Costa	(substituted off) 65'
FW	(Portugal) Artur Jorge
FW	(Portugal) Torres
Substitutes:
DF	(Portugal) Adolfo Calisto	(substituted on) 65'
Manager:
(Portugal) José Augusto

GK	1	(Portugal) Vítor Damas
DF	(Portugal) Pedro Gomes (c)
DF	(Portugal) Celestino Bárbara
DF	(Portugal) Francisco Caló
DF	(Portugal) José Carlos
DF	(Portugal) Hilário
MF	(Portugal) Vítor Gonçalves	(substituted off) 56'
MF	(Portugal) Fernando Peres
MF	(Portugal) Nélson Fernandes	(substituted off) 31'
FW	(Portugal) Joaquim Dinis
FW	(Portugal) Marinho
Substitutes:
DF	(Portugal) Manaca	(substituted on) 56'
FW	(Portugal) João Lourenço	(substituted on) 31'
Manager:
(Portugal) Fernando Vaz

1969–70 Taça de Portugal Winners
Benfica
14th Title

Match officials

- Assistant referees:
- Fourth official:

Match rules

- 90 minutes.
- 30 minutes of extra time if necessary.

== See also ==
- Derby de Lisboa
