= 1974–75 S.L. Benfica season =

Benfica
1974–75 season
- President: Borges Coutinho
- Head coach: Milorad Pavić
- Stadium: Estádio da Luz
- Primeira Divisão: 1st
- Taça de Portugal: Runners–up
- European Cup Winners' Cup: Quarter-finals
- Top goalscorer: League: Mário Moinhos (13); All: Mário Moinhos (18)
Home colours

The 1974–75 season was Sport Lisboa e Benfica's 71st season in existence and the club's 41st consecutive season in the top flight of Portuguese football, covering the period from 1 July 1974 to 30 June 1975. Benfica competed domestically in the Primeira Divisão and the Taça de Portugal, and participated in the European Cup Winners' Cup after being runners-up in the 1974 Taça de Portugal final. (Note: Sporting CP, as winners of the 1973–74 Taça de Portugal and 1973–74 Primeira Divisão, qualified for the 1974–75 European Cup)

After failing to retain the title in the past season, manager Fernando Cabrita was replaced by Milorad Pavić. With almost no signings in the transfer market, Benfica biggest departures were Rui Rodrigues and Zeca. After a lengthy pre-season, Benfica started their campaign with two victories against Belenenses and Farense. They dropped points in the third week, before winning the following two matches, reaching first place. In October, they drew with Boavista and lost at home to Porto, falling to third place. Four consecutive wins followed, until three draws in December cost them first place. Benfica lapped the first part of the season with a three-point deficit to Porto, but managed recover that in January. A draw in early February, with Académica de Coimbra stopped them, but the team reacted with five consecutive wins, opening a five-point lead by mid March. Benfica was then knocked out of the Cup Winners' Cup by PSV Eindhoven and lost for the league with Vitória de Setúbal, cutting their advantage to three-points. Nonetheless, in early May, Benfica confirmed their 21st league title, their 12th since 1960.

== Season summary ==
Benfica started the new season trying to recover the title lost to Sporting in the past season. Fernando Cabrita was replaced by Milorad Pavić, who was the second choice to Miljan Miljanić. Miljanić initially agreed with the club, but in March 1973, he back-tracked on his word, so he could sign with Real Madrid. Pavić, the former teacher of Miljanić, signed a 2-year deal on 22 April. Three days later, the Carnation Revolution changed the course of the country. In the transfer market, Benfica made almost no new signings but also only had three departures, Rui Rodrigues and Zeca, being the more noteworthy. The pre-season began on 19 July, with Pavić arriving to Portugal later in the same day. The first training sessions were in Serra da Estrela, before the club embarked on a tour in Mexico and United States in early August. Afterwards, they competed in the Trofeo Ciudad de Sevilla and the Independence Cup in Brazil.

Benfica started their league campaign with victories against Belenenses and Farense, reaching top of the table, ex aequo with Porto. On match-day 3, they dropped their first points, in a home draw with Olhanense. They reacted by winning their following two league matches, while also easily progressing in the Cup Winners' Cup. On 13 October, Benfica visited Estádio do Bessa to play Boavista and drew 0–0. That resulted in them being caught in first place by Vitória de Guimarães and Porto. A week later, Benfica lost at home with Porto by 1–0 and dropped to third place, two points shy of leaders Porto and Guimarães. They reacted positively to the loss and won their next four Primeira Divisão matches, retaking first place albeit shared with Porto. Both had 18 points. In Europe, Benfica qualified for the quarter-finals, after eliminating Carl Zeiss Jena in the second round. Off the field, Benfica lost Eusébio to injury, as he underwent his six operation to his left knee. On match-day 12, Benfica drew 0–0 with Oriental and dropped to second, a point from leaders Porto. In the final three matches of December, Benfica won the first but drew the others. First with Sporting on the 22, for the Lisbon derby, and then on the 29, with União de Tomar. Benfica lapped the first half of the season in second place with three points less than leaders Porto.

In January, Benfica won their opening match, while Porto lost theirs, reducing the gap between them to a point. Two weeks later, Benfica defeated Olhanense on the road and Porto lost in Alvalade, with the teams exchanging places. Benfica now led by a point over Porto. In the last match of the month, Benfica defeated Leixões at home, and Porto lost again, which increased Benfica's advantage to three-points, 31 to 28. However, a draw with Académica de Coimbra on 2 February, cut that lead to two points. In mid February, Benfica visited Estádio das Antas for the Clássico, defeating Porto by 3–0. Benfica had now a three-point lead over Sporting, who overtook Porto for second place. The team continued on their winning run, and on match-day 25, they added two more points in their difference over Sporting, which had lost in Bessa. However, Benfica would experienced a troubled third week of March. First they were knocked-out of the European Cup Winners' Cup by PSV Eindhoven at home. President Borges Coutinho attributed the defeat to a friendly of the national team, 9 days earlier in Goiânia; which negatively affected the Benfica players used. He called it "completely useless". On 23 March, Benfica lost with Vitória de Setúbal and saw his lead over Sporting reduced to three-points. They reacted with two consecutive wins, before meeting Sporting in Estádio de Alvalade on 4 May. Only needing a draw to win the title, they drew 1–1 and celebrated their 21st league title. It was their 12th in the past 16 seasons, and the 21st in the 41 editions of the Primeira Divisão. Three weeks into May, Pavić announced his departure, with Benfica signing Mário Wilson as his replacement. Before the season ended, Pavić qualified Benfica for the Taça de Portugal final, where they would play Boavista. They lost 2–1 with the goal from former Benfica youth player, João Alves being decisive. Captain Toni said: "We wanted to offer this Cup to Pavić. More than everyone else, he deserved it because of what he had done throughout the season...".

== Competitions ==
Win Draw Loss Postponed

=== Overall record ===
Competition	First match	Last match	Record								
Competition	First match	Last match	G	W	D	L	GF	GA	GD	Win %	Source
Primeira Divisão	11 September 1974	11 May 1975	30	21	7	2	62	12	+50	70.00	
Taça de Portugal	5 April 1975	14 June 1975	5	4	0	1	14	5	+9	80.00	
European Cup Winners' Cup	18 September 1974	19 March 1975	6	2	3	1	10	4	+6	33.33	
Total			41	27	10	4	86	21	+65	65.85	

=== Primeira Divisão ===
==== League table ====
Pos	Team	Pld	W	D	L	GF	GA	GD	Pts	Qualification or relegation
1	Benfica (C)	30	21	7	2	62	12	+50	49	Qualification to European Cup first round
2	Porto	30	19	6	5	62	30	+32	44	Qualification to UEFA Cup first round
3	Sporting CP	30	17	9	4	59	25	+34	43	Qualification to UEFA Cup first round
4	Boavista	30	16	6	8	58	32	+26	38	Qualification to Cup Winners' Cup first round
5	Vitória de Guimarães	30	16	6	8	64	36	+28	38	Qualification to UEFA Cup first round

Source: RSSSF and footballzz.co.uk
Rules for classification: 1) points; 2) goal difference; 3) number of goals scored.
(C) Champions

==== Results by round ====
Round	1	2	3	4	5	6	7	8	9	10	11	12	13	14	15	16	17	18	19	20	21	22	23	24	25	26	27	28	29	30
Ground	H	A	H	A	H	A	H	A	H	A	H	A	H	H	A	A	H	A	H	A	H	A	H	A	H	A	H	A	A	H
Result	W	W	D	W	W	D	L	W	W	W	W	D	W	D	D	W	W	W	W	D	W	W	W	W	W	L	W	W	D	W
Position	2	1	1	1	1	2	3	3	1	1	1	2	2	2	2	2	2	1	1	1	1	1	1	1	1	1	1	1	1	1

Source: ForaDeJogo
A = Away; H = Home; W = Win; D = Draw; L = Loss

==== Matches ====
11 September 1974 1	Benfica	4–0	Belenenses	Lisbon
18:00	Humberto Coelho 24'; Eusébio 53'; Nené 65'; Vítor Martins 88'	Report		Stadium: Estádio da Luz; Referee: Américo Barradas

15 September 1974 2	Farense	0–4	Benfica	Faro
18:00		Report	Humberto Coelho 17'; Jordão 24', 60', 78' (pen.)	Stadium: Estádio de São Luís; Referee: José Luís Tavares

22 September 1974 3	Benfica	2–2	Olhanense	Lisbon
18:00	Jordão 56'; Humberto Coelho 72'	Report	Ademir 26'; Renato 32'	Stadium: Estádio da Luz; Referee: António Espanhol

29 September 1974 4	Leixões	1–2	Benfica	Matosinhos
18:00	Hóracio 9'	Report	Jordão 3'; Humberto Coelho 28'	Stadium: Estádio do Mar; Referee: Manuel Vicente

6 October 1974 5	Benfica	4–0	Académica de Coimbra	Lisbon
18:00	Moinhos 8', 60', 63'; Jordão 31'	Report		Stadium: Estádio da Luz; Referee: Ismael Baltasar

13 October 1974 6	Boavista	0–0	Benfica	Porto
18:00		Report		Stadium: Estádio do Bessa; Referee: Joaquim Freire

20 October 1974 7	Benfica	0–1	Porto	Lisbon
20:00		Report	Cubillas 15' (pen.)	Stadium: Estádio da Luz; Referee: António Garrido

27 October 1974 8	Espinho	1–2	Benfica	Espinho
18:00	Bernardo da Velha 14'	Report	Vítor Baptista 27'; Nené 79'	Stadium: Campo da Avenida; Referee: Melo Acúrsio

3 November 1974 9	Benfica	3–0	Vitória de Guimarães	Lisbon
19:00	Humberto Coelho 11'; Nené 36', 81'	Report		Stadium: Estádio da Luz; Referee: Manuel Poeira

24 November 1974 10	CUF	0–1	Benfica	Barreiro
18:00		Report	Nené 86'	Stadium: Complexo Desportivo Alfredo da Silva; Referee: Bastos da Silva

1 December 1974 11	Benfica	2–0	Vitória de Setúbal	Lisbon
19:00	Nené 14'; Matine 32' (o.g.)	Report		Stadium: Estádio da Luz; Referee: César Correia

8 December 1974 12	Oriental	0–0	Benfica	Marvila
16:00		Report		Stadium: Campo Engenheiro Carlos Salema; Referee: Amândio de Castro

15 December 1974 13	Benfica	3–0	Atlético	Lisbon
17:00	Humberto Coelho 30', 61'; Ibraim 73'	Report		Stadium: Estádio da Luz; Referee: Lopes Martins

22 December 1974 14	Benfica	0–0	Sporting	Lisbon
18:00	Vítor Móia 21'	Report	Yazalde 48'	Stadium: Estádio da Luz; Referee: Porém Luís

29 December 1974 15	União de Tomar	0–0	Benfica	Tomar
16:00		Report		Stadium: Estádio Municipal de Tomar; Referee: Armando Paraty

5 January 1975 16	Belenenses	1–2	Benfica	Lisbon
18:00	Pietra 16'	Report	Moinhos 10', 86'	Stadium: Estádio do Restelo; Referee: César Correia

12 January 1975 17	Benfica	4–0	Farense	Lisbon
19:00	Moinhos 41', 46', 78'; Humberto Coelho 64'	Report		Stadium: Estádio da Luz; Referee: Mário Borges

19 January 1975 18	Olhanense	0–1	Benfica	Olhão
18:00		Report	Nené 84'	Stadium: Estádio José Arcanjo; Referee: Raúl Nazaré

26 January 1975 19	Benfica	3–0	Leixões	Lisbon
18:00	Nené 7'; Barros 34'; Artur Jorge 89'	Report		Stadium: Estádio da Luz; Referee: Amândio Silva

2 February 1975 20	Académica de Coimbra	0–0	Benfica	Coimbra
18:00		Report		Stadium: Estádio Municipal de Coimbra; Referee: Manuel Vicente

9 February 1975 21	Benfica	5–1	Boavista	Lisbon
18:00	Moinhos 6', 33'; Vítor Martins 11'; Nené 75'; Ibraim 79'	Report	Salvador 55'	Stadium: Estádio da Luz; Referee: Manuel Poeira

16 February 1975 22	Porto	0–3	Benfica	Porto
18:00		Report	17' Vítor Martins; 29' Moinhos; 73' Toni	Stadium: Estádio das Antas; Referee: Porém Luís

23 February 1975 23	Benfica	2–0	Espinho	Lisbon
18:00	Nené 74'; Toni 79'	Report		Stadium: Estádio da Luz; Referee: João Gomes

2 March 1975 24	Vitória de Guimarães	0–1	Benfica	Guimarães
18:00		Report	Diamantino Costa 60'	Stadium: Estádio D. Afonso Henriques; Referee: António Garrido

15 March 1975 25	Benfica	1–0	CUF	Lisbon
18:00	Moinhos 87'	Report		Stadium: Estádio da Luz; Referee: Armando Paraty

23 March 1975 26	Vitória de Setúbal	2–1	Benfica	Setúbal
18:00	Jacinto João 53'; Duda 86'	Report	Eusébio 20'	Stadium: Estádio do Bonfim; Referee: Jaime Loureiro

29 March 1975 27	Benfica	4–0	Oriental	Lisbon
18:00	Vítor Baptista 12', 87'; Diamantino Costa 14'; Barros 80'	Report		Stadium: Estádio da Luz; Referee: Nemésio de Castro

13 April 1975 28	Atlético	0–3	Benfica	Lisbon
18:30		Report	Diamantino Costa 21'; Artur Jorge 38', 62'	Stadium: Estádio da Tapadinha; Referee: António Garrido

4 May 1975 29	Sporting	1–1	Benfica	Lisbon
18:00	Fraguito 30'	Report	Diamantino Costa 52'	Stadium: Estádio de Alvalade; Referee: César Correia

11 May 1975 30	Benfica	3–1	União de Tomar	Lisbon
18:00	Nené 9'; Moinhos 19'; Diamantino Costa 78'	Report	Raul Águas 48'	Stadium: Estádio da Luz; Referee: Porém Luís

=== Taça de Portugal ===
5 April 1975 Fifth Rd	Benfica	6–0	Portimonense	Lisbon
18:00	Moinhos 4'; Artur Jorge 17'; Diamantino Costa 20', 54', 86'; Toni 39'	Report		Stadium: Estádio da Luz; Attendance: 30,000; Referee: Ismael Baltasar

18 May 1975 Sixth Rd	Leixões	2–4	Benfica	Matosinhos
15:00	Fernando 32'; Bastos Lopes 90' (o.g.)	Report	Moinhos 14', 65', 71', 89'	Stadium: Estádio do Mar; Attendance: 20,000; Referee: Alder Dante

25 May 1975 Quarter-final	Vitória de Setúbal	0–1	Benfica	Setúbal
18:00		Report	Nené 86'	Stadium: Estádio do Bonfim; Attendance: 15,000; Referee: Moreira Tavares

30 May 1975 Semi-final	Belenenses	1–2	Benfica	Lisbon
18:00	Gonzalez 89' (pen.)	Report	Nené 7', 52'	Stadium: Estádio do Restelo; Attendance: 20,000; Referee: Raúl Nazaré

14 June 1975 Final	Benfica	1–2	Boavista	Lisbon
17:00	Jordão 58'	Report	Mané 17'; João Alves 19'	Stadium: Estádio José Alvalade; Attendance: 40,000; Referee: António Garrido

=== European Cup Winners' Cup ===
==== First round ====
18 September 1974 First leg	Benfica (Portugal)	4–0	(Denmark) Vanløse	Lisbon
21:30	Humberto Coelho 26'; Nené 43'; Jordão 65', 89'			Stadium: Estádio da Luz; Attendance: 40,000; Referee: Augusto Ibáñez

2 October 1974 Second Leg	Vanløse (Denmark)	1–4 (1–8 agg.)	(Portugal) Benfica	Copenhagen
20:30	Petterson 15'		Nené 27'; Jordão 29', 43'; Barros 86'	Stadium: Idrætsparken; Attendance: 15,000; Referee: Eric Smyton

==== Second round ====
23 October 1974 First Leg	Carl Zeiss Jena (East Germany)	1–1	(Portugal) Benfica	Jena
17:00	Vogel 76'		Nené 19'	Stadium: Ernst Abbe Sportfield; Attendance: 25,000; Referee: Walter Hungerbühler

6 November 1974 Second leg	Benfica (Portugal)	0–0 (1–1 (a) agg.)	(East Germany) Carl Zeiss Jena	Lisbon
21:45				Stadium: Estádio da Luz; Attendance: 50,000; Referee: Pat Partridge

==== Quarter-final ====
5 March 1975 First Leg	PSV Eindhoven (Netherlands)	0–0	(Portugal) Benfica	Eindhoven
19:00				Stadium: Philips Stadion; Attendance: 25,000; Referee: Alberto Michelotti

19 March 1975 Second leg	Benfica (Portugal)	1–2 (1–2 agg.)	(Netherlands) PSV Eindhoven	Lisbon
21:30	Humberto Coelho 17'		Van de Kerkhof 11'; Van der Kuijlen 85'	Stadium: Estádio da Luz; Attendance: 50,000; Referee: John Wright Paterson

=== Friendlies ===
31 July 1974	Monterrey	2–4	Benfica	Monterrey
				Stadium: Estadio Tecnológico; Attendance: 20,000

4 August 1974	Club León	3–4	Benfica	León, Guanajuato
			Nené; Jordão; Humberto Coelho; Jaime Graça	Stadium: Estadio León

7 August 1974 João Havelange TM	Cruzeiro	3–5	Benfica	Los Angeles
	Roberto Batata; José Geraldo Cândido		Vítor Baptista; Nené; Jordão	Stadium: Los Angeles Memorial Coliseum; Attendance: 13,000

11 August 1974 João Havelange TM	Benfica	3–2	America	Los Angeles
	Nené; Moinhos; Toni			Stadium: Los Angeles Memorial Coliseum; Attendance: 25,000

14 August 1974	Racing White	1–5	Benfica	Brussels
			Eusébio; Jordão; Toni	Stadium: Edmond Machtens Stadium

20 August 1974 Trofeo de Sevilla	Sevilla FC	1–2	Benfica	Seville
	Enrique Lora 23'		Eusébio 8'; Simões 89'	Stadium: Ramón Sánchez Pizjuán Stadium

23 August 1974 Trofeo de Sevilla	Betis	0–0 (5–3 p)	Benfica	Seville
				Stadium: Ramón Sánchez Pizjuán Stadium
	Penalties
			(penalty scored) Rui Jordão; (penalty scored) Nené; (penalty scored) Eusébio; (penalty missed) Humberto Coelho; (penalty missed) Artur; (penalty missed) Simões

30 August 1974	France	4–2	Benfica	Paris
	Bereta 10'; Chiesa 25'; Bianchi 54'; Revelli 74'		Humberto 30'; Eusébio 82'	Stadium: Parc des Princes; Attendance: 40,000; Referee: M. Wurtz

2 September 1974	Benfica	0–0 (4–3 p)	Lech Poznan	Lisbon
				Stadium: Estádio da Luz

3 September 1974 Independência Cup	Cruzeiro	1–2	Benfica	Belo Horizonte
	Dirceu Lopes 72'		Vítor Baptista 15'; Nené 25'	Stadium: Mineirão; Attendance: 26.430; Referee: Joaquim Gonçalves

5 September 1974 Independência Cup	Atlético Mineiro	0–1	Benfica	Belo Horizonte
			Rui Jordão 80'	Stadium: Mineirão

9 October 1974 Taça de Honra	Belenenses	1–5	Benfica	Lisbon
	Renê		Diamantino; Rui Jordão; Humberto Coelho; Ibraim Silva	Stadium: Estádio do Restelo

16 October 1974 Taça de Honra	Benfica	1–0	Sporting	Lisbon
	Tomé 6' (o.g.)			Stadium: Estádio do Restelo

11 December 1974	Celtic	3–3 (4–5 p)	Benfica	Glasgow
	McCluskey 37'; Jimmy Johnstone 51'; Ronnie Glavin 66'		Vítor Móia 2', 12'; Nené 68'	Stadium: Celtic Park; Attendance: 30,000; Referee: Bobby Davidson
	Penalties
	McCluskey (penalty scored); Wilson (penalty scored); MacDonald (penalty scored); Jimmy Johnstone (penalty scored); McNeill (penalty missed)		(penalty scored) Nené; (penalty scored) Vítor Baptista; (penalty scored) Vítor Martins; (penalty scored) Humberto Coelho; (penalty scored) Toni

18 June 1975	Marocco	2–1	Benfica	Casablanca
			Vítor Baptista	Stadium: Stade Mohamed V

27 June 1975 Trofeo Ibérico	Standard Liège	2–2 (8–7 p)	Benfica	Badajoz
	Sigurvinsson 11'; Piot 86' (pen.)		Artur 11'; Nené 51' (pen.)	Stadium: Estadio El Vivero; Referee: Pablo Sánchez Ibáñez

28 June 1975 Trofeo Ibérico	CD Badajoz	1–1 (4–5 p)	Benfica	Badajoz
	Ciriaco Cano 12'		Nené 12'	Stadium: Estadio El Vivero

== Player statistics ==
The squad for the season consisted of the players listed in the tables below, as well as staff member Milorad Pavić (manager), Fernando Cabrita (assistant manager), Fernando Neves (Director of Football).

Note 1: Note: Flags indicate national team as defined under FIFA eligibility rules. Players may hold more than one non-FIFA nationality.

Note 2: Players with squad numbers marked ‡ joined the club during the 1974-75 season via transfer, with more details in the following section.

No.	Pos	Nat	Player	Total		Primeira Divisão		Taça de Portugal		European Cup Winners' Cup	
No.	Pos	Nat	Player	Apps	Goals	Apps	Goals	Apps	Goals	Apps	Goals
1	GK	(Portugal) POR	Manuel Bento	21	0	15	0	3	0	3	0
1	GK	(Portugal) POR	José Henrique	22	0	16	0	2	0	4	0
2	DF	(Portugal) POR	Adolfo Calisto	12	0	10	0	0	0	2	0
3	DF	(Portugal) POR	Amândio Malta da Silva	15	0	10	0	3	0	2	0
3	DF	(Portugal) POR	Artur Correia	35	1	26	1	3	0	6	0
4	DF	(Portugal) POR	Humberto Coelho	44	10	34	8	4	0	6	2
4	DF	(Portugal) POR	Messias Timula	29	0	21	0	5	0	3	0
4	DF	(Portugal) POR	António Barros	37	3	27	2	5	0	5	1
5	DF	(Portugal) POR	António Bastos Lopes	6	0	3	0	3	0	0	0
5	DF	(Portugal) POR	Jaime Graça	7	0	4	0	0	0	3	0
6^{‡}	MF	(Portugal) POR	Ibraim Silva	16	2	14	2	2	0	0	0
6	MF	(Portugal) POR	Toni	39	3	29	2	5	1	5	0
7	FW	(Portugal) POR	Nené	34	17	26	11	3	3	5	3
8	MF	(Portugal) POR	José Pedro	2	0	1	0	0	0	1	0
8	MF	(Portugal) POR	Vítor Martins	31	3	24	3	1	0	6	0
9	FW	(Portugal) POR	Vítor Baptista	32	3	23	3	4	0	5	0
9	FW	(Portugal) POR	Eusébio	13	2	9	2	0	0	4	0
9	FW	(Portugal) POR	Rui Jordão	14	11	8	6	4	1	2	4
9	FW	(Portugal) POR	Mário Moinhos	37	18	27	13	5	5	5	0
9	FW	(Portugal) POR	Artur Jorge	4	3	3	2	1	1	0	0
10	MF	(Portugal) POR	António Simões	33	0	26	0	1	0	6	0
11	MF	(Portugal) POR	Diamantino Costa	22	8	16	5	5	3	1	0
11	MF	(Portugal) POR	Shéu	7	0	3	0	4	0	0	0
11^{‡}	FW	(Portugal) POR	Vítor Móia	10	1	8	1	2	0	0	0

== Transfers ==
=== In ===
Entry date	Position	Player	From club	Fee	Ref
27 June 1974	MF	Ibraim Silva	Vitória de Guimarães	Undisclosed	
10 September 1974	FW	Vítor Móia	Oriental de Lisboa	Loan return	

=== Out ===
Exit date	Position	Player	To club	Fee	Ref
29 July 1974	DF	Rui Rodrigues	Vitória de Guimarães	Free	
24 August 1974	MF	Eurico Caires	Estoril Praia	Free	
9 September 1974	DF	Zeca	União de Tomar	Free	

=== Out by loan ===
Exit date	Position	Player	To club	Return date	Ref
20 July 1974	GK	João Fonseca	Ourense	30 June 1975	
1 August 1974	FW	Rui Lopes	Olhanense	30 June 1975	
3 August 1974	DF	Eduardo Luís	Marítimo	30 June 1975	
23 August 1974	MF	Bernardino Pedroto	Vitória de Guimarães	30 June 1975	
2 September 1974	MF	Nelinho	Ourense	30 June 1975	
