= 1965 Taça de Portugal final =

- Event: 1964–65 Taça de Portugal
Benfica	Vitória de Setúbal
1	3
- Date: 4 July 1965
- Venue: Estádio Nacional, Oeiras
- Referee: Francisco Guerra (Porto)

The 1965 Taça de Portugal final was the final match of the 1964–65 Taça de Portugal, the 25th season of the Taça de Portugal, the premier Portuguese football cup competition organized by the Portuguese Football Federation (FPF). The match was played on 4 July 1965 at the Estádio Nacional in Oeiras, and opposed two Primeira Liga sides: Benfica and Vitória de Setúbal. Vitória de Setúbal defeated Benfica 3–1 to claim their first Taça de Portugal.

== Match ==
=== Details ===
4 July 1965

Benfica	1–3	Vitória de Setúbal
Cavém 82'		José Maria 8'; Graça 57'; Bonjour 83'

Estádio Nacional, Oeiras
Referee: Francisco Guerra (Porto)

Benfica	Vitória de Setúbal

GK	1	(Portugal) Costa Pereira
DF		(Portugal) Raúl Machado
DF		(Portugal) Fernando Cruz
DF		(Portugal) Germano
MF		(Portugal) António Simões
MF		(Portugal) Mário Coluna (c)
MF		(Portugal) Domiciano Cavém
FW		(Portugal) Eusébio
FW		(Portugal) José Augusto
FW		(Portugal) José Torres
FW		(Portugal) Yaúca
Substitutes:
Manager:
(Hungary) Béla Guttmann

GK	1	(Portugal) José Mourinho Félix
DF		(Portugal) Carlos Torpes (c)
DF		(Portugal) Herculano Oliveira
DF		(Portugal) Joaquim Conceição
DF		(Portugal) Carlos Cardoso
MF		(Portugal) Jaime Graça
MF		(Brazil) Augusto Martins
MF		(Portugal) Armando Bonjour
FW		(Portugal) José Maria
FW		(Portugal) Carlos Manuel
FW		(Portugal) Quim
Substitutes:
Manager:
(Portugal) Fernando Vaz

1964–65 Taça de Portugal Winners
Vitória de Setúbal
1st Title

Match officials

- Assistant referees:
- Fourth official:

Match rules

- 90 minutes.
- 30 minutes of extra time if necessary.
