= Alfredo Nascimento =

Alfredo Nascimento may refer to:

- Alfredo Nascimento (politician) (born 1952), Brazilian politician
- Alfredo Nascimento (footballer) (born 1937), Portuguese footballer
