= Francisco Caló =

Portuguese footballer (1946–2021)

Personal information
- Full name: Francisco António Galinho Caló
- Date of birth: 5 September 1946
- Place of birth: Montemor-o-Novo, Portugal
- Date of death: 12 July 2021 (aged 74)
- Place of death: Portugal
- Position: Centre-back

Senior career*
Years	Team	Apps	(Gls)
1965–1972	Sporting CP	74	(1)
1968–1969	→ União Tomar (loan)	23	(0)
1974–1975	Atlético	24	(1)
1975–1976	Estoril	0	(0)
Total		121	(2)

International career
1971	Portugal	1	(0)
- * Club domestic league appearances and goals

Francisco António Galinho Caló (5 September 1946 – 12 July 2021) was a Portuguese professional footballer who played as a central defender.

== Club career ==
Born in Montemor-o-Novo, Évora District, Caló joined Sporting CP in 1965 at the age of 18. He was irregularly used in his seven-year spell in Lisbon, also being loaned to fellow Primeira Liga team U.F.C.I. Tomar in the 1968–69 season; he was part of the squad that notably defeated his parent club 2–1 at home and drew at FC Porto 1–1 to finish tenth in the table.

Caló contributed a total of 30 games and one goal to win two national championships, in 1966 and 1970. He also won the 1971 Taça de Portugal against S.L. Benfica, losing two finals against the same adversary, and retired professionally at only 29 after one-year stints with two other sides in the country's capital, Atlético Clube de Portugal and G.D. Estoril Praia.

== International career ==
Calón earned one cap for Portugal, appearing in a 2–1 loss to Scotland for the UEFA Euro 1972 qualifiers on 13 October 1971, in Glasgow.

== Death ==
Caló died on 12 July 2021 at the age of 74, from unknown causes.
