= António Barros =

Portuguese footballer (1949–2018)

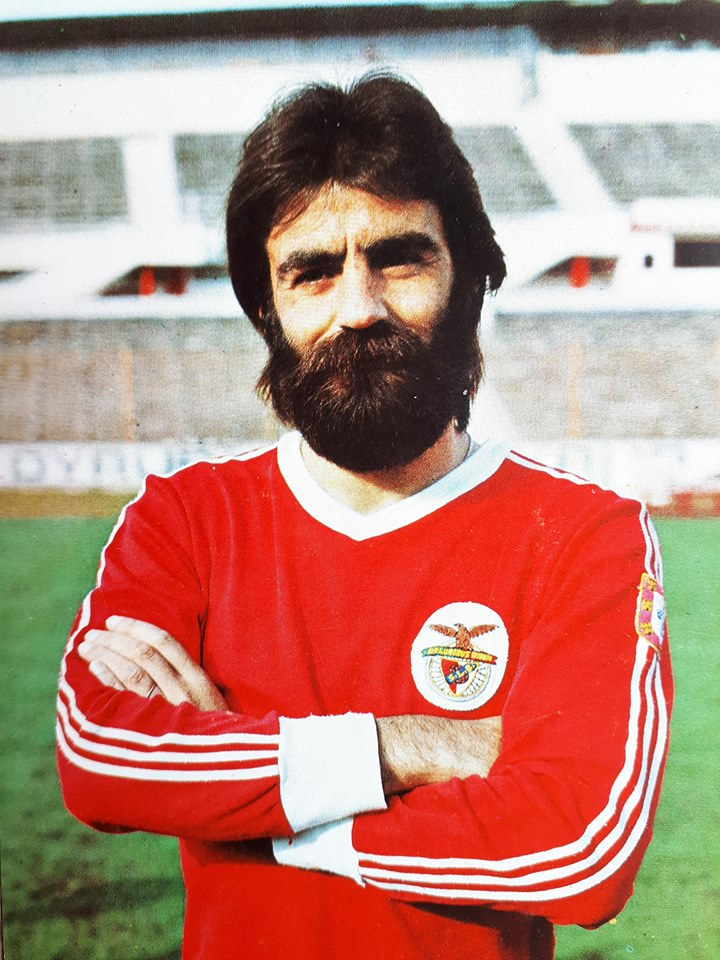

Personal information
- Full name: António Monteiro Teixeira de Barros
- Date of birth: 2 October 1949
- Place of birth: Matosinhos, Portugal
- Date of death: 8 April 2018 (aged 68)
- Place of death: Netherlands
- Position: Defender

Youth career
- 1962–1968: Leixões

Senior career*
Years	Team	Apps	(Gls)
1968–1970	Leixões	44	(1)
1970–1972	Benfica	5	(0)
1972–1973	→ União Coimbra (loan)	26	(0)
1973–1978	Benfica	162	(3)
1978	Montreal Castors		
1978–1979	Boavista	4	(0)
1980–1981	Hartford Hellions (indoor)	4	(0)
1982–1983	Portimonense	19	(0)
1983–1985	Estoril Praia	13	(0)
1987–1988	Sport Cabeção e Benfica		

International career
1968	Portugal U18	5	(0)
1969–1973	Portugal U21	5	(0)
1974–1976	Portugal	7	(0)
- * Club domestic league appearances and goals

António Monteiro Teixeira de Barros (2 October 1949 – 8 April 2018) was a Portuguese professional footballer who played as defender.

In the summer of 1978 he played abroad in the National Soccer League with Montreal Castors. In 1980, he played in the Major Indoor Soccer League with Hartford Hellions.

Barros gained 7 caps for the Portugal national team.

== Honours ==
Benfica

- Primeira Liga: 1970–71, 1974–75, 1975–76, 1976–77
