= Nascimento (footballer, born 1937) =

Portuguese footballer (born 1937)

Personal information
- Full name: Alfredo José Henriques Nascimento
- Date of birth: 5 May 1937 (age 89)
- Place of birth: Montijo, Portugal
- Height: 1.85 m (6 ft 1 in)
- Position: Goalkeeper

Senior career*
Years	Team	Apps	(Gls)
1959–1964	Belenenses	31	(0)
1964–1970	Benfica	27	(0)
1970–1974	União de Tomar	79	(0)
Total		137	(0)
- * Club domestic league appearances and goals

Alfredo José Henriques Nascimento (born 5 May 1937), known as Nascimento, is a Portuguese retired footballer who played as a goalkeeper.

== Career ==
Born in Montijo, Portugal, Nascimento arrived at 22 to C.F. Os Belenenses, being back-up to José Pereira, but playing most games in 1963–64.

He joined S.L. Benfica in the following year, with Costa Pereira having physical problems, he replaced him in a winning league campaign in 1966–67. However, the rapid ascension of Zé Gato, stalled his career at Benfica, so he moved to União de Tomar in 1970 and retired four years later, age 37.

== Honours ==
Benfica

- Primeira Liga: 1964–65, 1966–67, 1968–69
