= Manaca (footballer) =

Mozambican-Portuguese footballer and manager

Personal information
- Full name: Carlos Alberto Manaca Dias
- Date of birth: 22 September 1946 (age 80)
- Place of birth: Beira, Mozambique
- Height: 1.79 m (5 ft 10 in)
- Position: Defender

Senior career*
Years	Team	Apps	(Gls)
1965	Sporting Beira		
1966–1968	Sporting	4	(0)
1968–1969	Sanjoanense	17	(3)
1969–1975	Sporting	118	(3)
1975	Boston Minutemen	5	(0)
1975–1976	Vitória de Setúbal	26	(6)
1976–1977	Braga	27	(3)
1977–1978	Sporting	26	(0)
1978–1980	Vitória de Guimarães	55	(3)
1980–1983	Estoril		
1983–1985	Peniche		

Managerial career
- 1983–1984: Peniche
- 1986: Mozambique
- * Club domestic league appearances and goals

Carlos Alberto Manaca Dias, known as Carlos Manaca or simply Manaca (born 22 September 1946) is a Mozambican former football player and manager. He also holds Portuguese citizenship.

He played 15 seasons and 326 games in the Primeira Liga for Sporting, Vitória de Guimarães, Estoril, Braga, Vitória de Setúbal and Sanjoanense.

== Career ==
Manaca made his Primeira Liga debut for Sporting on 18 December 1966 in a game against CUF Barreiro.

== Honours ==
Sporting

- Primeira Liga: 1969–70, 1973–74.
- Taça de Portugal: 1970–71, 1972–1973, 1973–74, 1977–78.
