= Malta da Silva =

Portuguese footballer

Amândio Malta da Silva
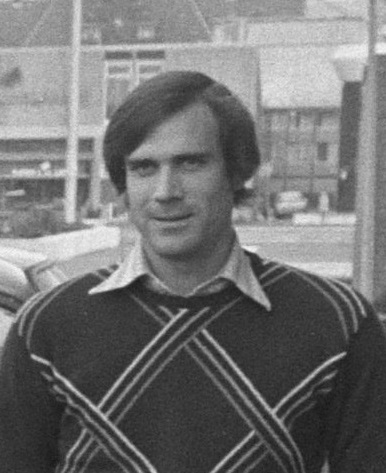
- Malta da Silva in 1972

Personal information
- Full name: Amândio José Malta da Silva
- Date of birth: 19 February 1943 (age 83)
- Place of birth: Benguela, Angola
- Height: 1.83 m (6 ft 0 in)
- Position: Defender

Senior career*
Years	Team	Apps	(Gls)
1964–1976	Benfica	138	(1)
1977	San Jose Earthquakes	5	(0)
1977	New England Oceaneers	16	(0)
1978–1981	Benfica Castelo Branco		
1981–1982	Lusitano		
1982–1983	Pêro Pinheiro		
Total		159	(1)

International career
1971	Portugal	5	(0)

Managerial career
- 1979–1981: Benfica Castelo Branco
- * Club domestic league appearances and goals

Amândio José Malta da Silva (born 19 February 1943) is a Portuguese retired footballer who played as a right back or a central defender.

== Club career ==
Born Benguela, Portuguese Angola, Malta da Silva was discovered by S.L. Benfica's scouting team at Clube Nacional de Benguela. He joined the club in 1964, and made his competitive debut on 3 January of the following year in an away win against Seixal FC, playing five more Primeira Liga games as the season ended in league conquest. Facing heavy competition from Humberto Coelho, Germano, Raúl Machado and Jacinto Santos he appeared mainly in the Taça de Portugal, failing to feature in the league from 8 May 1965 to 23 March 1969.

Malta da Silva had his breakthrough season at the age of 26, starting as right back for Benfica and playing 33 matches in 1969–70, where the Portuguese Cup was won. In the following three campaigns, under Jimmy Hagan, he battled with Adolfo and Artur Correia for the position, but still appeared in over 60 league contests to win the three-peat; however, starting from 1973–74, he gradually lost his importance in the squad, leaving the club in 1976 with official totals of 192 games and one goal.

In 1977, Malta da Silva followed many teammates to the North American Soccer League. He played with António Simões in the San Jose Earthquakes, and then moved to New England Oceaneers in American Soccer League.

Two years later, Malta da Silva embarked on a managerial career with Sport Benfica e Castelo Branco, promoting them from the third division in his first season and finishing twelfth the following year to avoid relegation.

== International career ==
Due to his performances at club level, Malta da Silva received his first call-up to the Portugal national football team in 1971, during the UEFA Euro 1972 qualifying campaign. He made his debut on 17 February in a 1–3 loss in Belgium, and played four more games during the tournament, twice against Scotland and once against Denmark, earning his final cap on 21 November against Belgium.

== Honours ==
- Primeira Liga: 1964–65, 1968–69, 1970–71, 1971–72, 1972–73, 1974–75, 1975–76
- Taça de Portugal: 1968–69, 1969–70
