= Vítor Gonçalves (footballer, born 1944) =

Portuguese footballer (1944–2025)

Personal information
- Full name: Vítor Manuel de Almeida Gonçalves
- Date of birth: 25 February 1944
- Place of birth: Portugal
- Date of death: 16 December 2025 (aged 81)
- Position: Midfielder

Senior career*
Years	Team	Apps	(Gls)
- Sporting CP

International career
1969	Portugal	2	(0)
- * Club domestic league appearances and goals

Vítor Manuel de Almeida Gonçalves (25 February 1944 – 16 December 2025) was a Portuguese footballer who played as a midfielder for Sporting CP. Gonçalves died on 16 December 2025, at the age of 81.
