= Jaime Graça =

Portuguese footballer and coach

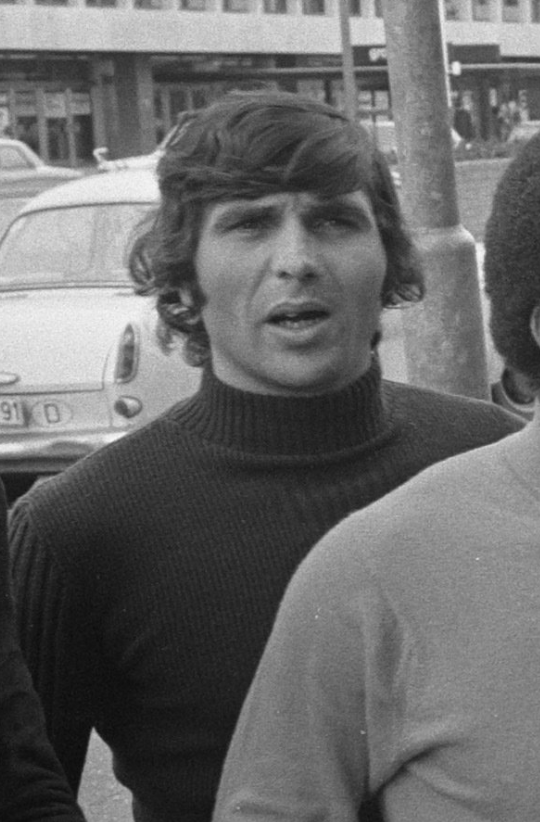
- Graça in 1972

Personal information
- Full name: Jaime da Silva Graça
- Date of birth: 30 January 1942
- Place of birth: Setúbal, Portugal
- Date of death: 28 February 2012 (aged 70)
- Place of death: Lisbon, Portugal
- Height: 1.63 m (5 ft 4 in)
- Position: Midfielder

Youth career
- Palmelense
- 1959–1961: Vitória Setúbal

Senior career*
Years	Team	Apps	(Gls)
1961–1966	Vitória Setúbal	103	(32)
1966–1975	Benfica	159	(19)
1975–1977	Vitória Setúbal	41	(4)
1978–1979	Sesimbra		
1979	Eléctrico		
1980–1981	Oliveirenses		
Total		303	(55)

International career
1965–1972	Portugal	36	(4)
Medal record
Men's football
Representing Portugal
FIFA World Cup
Third place	1966 England
- * Club domestic league appearances and goals

Jaime da Silva Graça (Portuguese pronunciation: [ˈʒajmɨ ˈɣɾasɐ]; 30 January 1942 – 28 February 2012) was a Portuguese football midfielder and manager.

== Club career ==
Born in Setúbal, Graça made his professional – and Primeira Liga – debut with local Vitória Futebol Clube, appearing in nearly 150 official games over five seasons and helping the Sadinos to three Taça de Portugal finals during his spell.

In summer 1966, after totalling 28 goals in his last two seasons with Vitória, he signed with S.L. Benfica, where he would win seven national championships and three Portuguese Cups, playing 229 matches in all competitions (29 goals). He equalised the 1967–68 European Cup final, a 4–1 extra time loss against Manchester United.

On 5 December 1966, Benfica's new hydro massage bath short-circuited with seven players immersed. Luciano Fernandes was electrocuted before Graça – an electrician by trade before he became a professional footballer – could save himself and the others, and the team played the rest of that season in black.

After featuring rarely during his latter years at the Estádio da Luz, the 33-year-old Graça returned to his first club, retiring from the game in 1977 with Portuguese top-flight (the only division he competed in) totals of 303 matches and 55 goals. He was in charge of C.D. Santa Clara as the Azores side were promoted to the Segunda Liga in 1987, but could not prevent relegation the following year.

== International career ==
Graça collected 36 caps for the Portugal national team and scored four goals, mostly whilst as a Benfica player. His debut came on 24 January 1965, in a 5–1 home victory over Turkey for the 1966 FIFA World Cup qualifiers.

Graça was selected for the final stages in England, appearing in all the games for the eventual third-placed team. He also represented the nation in the Brazilian Independence Cup in 1972, where Portugal lost to hosts Brazil, in what would be his last international appearance.

Graça assisted José Torres in the ill-fated 1986 World Cup in Mexico, marred by the Saltillo Affair.

== Death ==
On 28 February 2012, Graça died at the Lusíadas Hospital in Lisbon after a long battle with illness. He was 70 years old.

== Career statistics ==
Scores and results list Portugal's goal tally first, score column indicates score after each Graça goal.

List of international goals scored by Jaime Graça
No.	Date	Venue	Opponent	Score	Result	Competition
1	24 January 1965	Estádio Nacional, Lisbon, Portugal	Turkey	3–1	5–1	1966 World Cup qualification
2	13 November 1966	Estádio Nacional, Lisbon, Portugal	Sweden	1–0	1–2	Euro 1968 qualifying
3	12 November 1967	Estádio das Antas, Porto, Portugal	Norway	2–1	2–1	Euro 1968 qualifying
4	2 July 1972	Estádio do Maracanã, Rio de Janeiro, Brazil	Uruguay	1–1	1–1	Brazilian Independence Cup

== Honours ==
Setúbal

- Taça de Portugal: 1964–65

Benfica

- Primeira Divisão: 1966–67, 1967–68, 1968–69, 1970–71, 1971–72, 1972–73, 1974–75
- Taça de Portugal: 1968–69, 1969–70, 1971–72
- Taça de Honra (3)
- European Cup runner-up: 1967–68

Portugal

- FIFA World Cup third place: 1966
