= Diamantino Costa =

Portuguese footballer

Personal information
- Full name: Diamantino José Vieira da Costa
- Date of birth: 29 May 1948 (age 78)
- Place of birth: Portimão, Portugal
- Height: 1.74 m (5 ft 9 in)
- Position: Winger

Youth career
- 1965–1966: Benfica

Senior career*
Years	Team	Apps	(Gls)
1966–1977	Benfica	84	(8)
1968–1969	→ Varzim (loan)	25	(5)
1977	Team Hawaii	10	(1)
1977	Las Vegas Quicksilvers	5	(0)
1977–1980	Portimonense	38	(2)
1980–1984	Estoril-Praia	91	(13)
1984–1985	União de Tomar		
Total		253	(29)

International career
1969	Portugal U21	3	(0)

Managerial career
- 1994–1995: Portimonense
- 1997–1998: Portimonense
- 2003–2004: Portimonense
- * Club domestic league appearances and goals

Diamantino José Vieira da Costa (born 29 February 1948) is a Portuguese retired footballer who played as a left winger

Over the course of 14 seasons, he amassed Primeira Liga totals of 215 games and eighteen goals, mainly at Benfica, where he won eight major titles.

== Club career ==
Born in Portimão, Costa is a youth graduate from S.L. Benfica, he made his professional debut on 3 November 1966 against Ovarense, also scoring his first goal. After two seasons playing for the reserves, he went on loan to Varzim in 1968–69.

During the next seasons, he was mostly used as substitute for António Simões, winning 6 Primeira Liga's and two Taças de Portugal. On 26 November 1969, he scored the third goal against Celtic in a second-round game of the 1969–70 European Cup. After a final 3–3 on aggregate, Celtic passed on coin toss.

In 1977, Costa left Benfica and joined freshly created Team Hawaii, later moving to the Las Vegas Quicksilvers, reuniting with Eusébio. Following this brief period, he returned to his home town club Portimonense, earning a Segunda Divisão title in 1978–79. He played a further five seasons, mostly at Estoril-Praia, retiring at age 37.

== Honours ==
Benfica

- Portuguese League: 1970–71, 1971–72, 1972–73, 1974–75, 1975–76, 1976–77
- Portuguese Cup: 1969–70, 1971–72
