= Fernando Tomé =

Portuguese footballer and manager

Personal information
- Full name: Fernando Massano Tomé
- Date of birth: 10 July 1947 (age 79)
- Place of birth: Porto, Portugal
- Height: 1.76 m (5 ft 9 in)
- Position: Midfielder

Youth career
- 1961–1965: Vitória Setúbal

Senior career*
Years	Team	Apps	(Gls)
1965–1970	Vitória Setúbal	101	(21)
1970–1976	Sporting CP	97	(10)
1976–1978	Vitória Setúbal	50	(3)
1978–1980	União Leiria	17	(1)
Total		265	(35)

International career
1969	Portugal	2	(0)

Managerial career
- 1980: União Leiria (player-coach)
- 1980–1981: Lixa
- 1982–1983: União Leiria
- 1983: Penafiel
- 1985–1986: Vitória Setúbal
- 1986: Oriental
- 1986–1987: Famalicão
- 1990–1991: Olivais Moscavide
- * Club domestic league appearances and goals

Fernando Massano Tomé (born 10 July 1947 in Porto) is a Portuguese former football midfielder and manager. His career was mostly associated to Vitória de Setúbal, as both a player and coach.

== Honours ==
Vitória Setúbal

- Taça de Portugal: 1966–67

Sporting CP

- Primeira Liga: 1973–74
- Taça de Portugal: 1970–71, 1972–73, 1973–74
