= Fernando Vaz =

Portuguese football coach (1918–1986)

Personal information
- Full name: Fernando Gomes Ribeiro Vaz
- Date of birth: 5 August 1918
- Place of birth: Benguela, Portuguese Angola
- Date of death: 25 August 1986 (aged 68)
- Place of death: Lisbon, Portugal

Youth career
- 1927–1935: Casa Pia

Senior career*
Years	Team	Apps	(Gls)
1935–1940	Casa Pia		

Managerial career
- 1951–1953: Belenenses
- 1952: Vitória Setúbal
- 1952–1953: Porto
- 1953–1954: Braga
- 1954: Portugal
- 1954–1955: Porto
- 1955–1956: Vitória Guimarães
- 1956–1957: Caldas
- 1957–1958: Vitória Guimarães
- 1958–1959: Belenenses
- 1959–1960: Sporting CP
- 1960–1961: CUF
- 1961–1962: Vitória Setúbal
- 1962–1964: Belenenses
- 1964–1969: Vitória Setúbal
- 1969–1972: Sporting CP
- 1972–1974: Académica
- 1974–1975: Atlético
- 1975–1976: Beira-Mar
- 1976–1977: Vitória Setúbal
- 1977–1979: Marítimo
- * Club domestic league appearances and goals

Fernando Vaz (5 August 1918 – 25 August 1986) was a Portuguese football player and coach.
