= Duarte Borges Coutinho =

Portuguese businessman (1921–1981)

Borges Coutinho 4th Marquess of Praia and of Monforte
- Born: Duarte António Borges Coutinho; 18 November 1921; Lisbon, Portugal
- Died: 19 May 1981 (aged 59); Greater London, England
- Known for: Presidency of S.L. Benfica
- Spouse: Ana Maria Borges Coutinho (m. 1950)
- Children: 5
- Parent(s): António Borges Coutinho de Medeiros Sousa Dias da Câmara; Maria Ana Davidson Perestrelo de Vasconcelos

Duarte António Borges Coutinho, 4th Marquess of Praia and of Monforte (18 November 1921 – 19 May 1981), commonly known simply as Borges Coutinho, was the 26th president of Portuguese sports club S.L. Benfica.

Born in Lisbon and educated both in England and Portugal, Borges Coutinho became a member of Benfica in 1959, aged 37. Ten years later, he became president of the club after defeating candidates Fernando Martins and Romão Martins in the elections of 12 April 1969, with 58 percent of the votes. During his eight-year presidency (four consecutive biennial terms), the football team won seven Primeira Liga titles (personal record) – one of them without defeat, in the 1972–73 campaign – and three Taça de Portugal trophies. This allowed Benfica to consolidate their hegemony in Portuguese football.

Under Borges Coutinho's term, in 1969, Benfica took possession of lands near their stadium, Estádio da Luz, to create three football pitches, one synthetic athletics track, and eight tennis courts. He was awarded with the Águia de Ouro (Golden Eagle) by the club in 1973. After deciding not to contest the elections of 26 May 1977, he was succeeded by José Ferreira Queimado.

Borges Coutinho died at the age of 59 in Greater London, England.

Preceded by Adolfo Vieira de Brito	President of Benfica; 1969–1977	Succeeded by José Ferreira Queimado
