= Nélson Fernandes =

Portuguese footballer (born 1946)

Nélson
Personal information
- Full name: Nélson Fernandes
- Date of birth: 3 August 1946 (age 80)
- Place of birth: Funchal, Portugal
- Position: Midfielder

Youth career
- 1957–1961: Marítimo
- 1961–1964: Benfica

Senior career*
Years	Team	Apps	(Gls)
1964–1965	Varzim	24	(12)
1965–1968	Benfica	28	(9)
1968–1969	Varzim	22	(6)
1969–1976	Sporting	195	(70)
1976–1978	Marítimo	19	(1)
1978–1980	Portimonense	8	(1)
1980–1982	Salgueiros	48	(15)
1982–1983	Tirsense		
1983–1984	Vianense		
1984–1985	Leça		
1985–1986	Aguçadoura		
Total		344	(114)

International career
1969–1970	Portugal	3	(0)
- * Club domestic league appearances and goals

Nélson Fernandes (born 3 August 1946), known as Nélson, is a retired Portuguese international footballer who played as an attacking midfielder.
