= Vítor Damas =

Portuguese footballer and manager (1947–2003)

Personal information
- Full name: Vítor Manuel Afonso Damas de Oliveira
- Date of birth: 8 October 1947
- Place of birth: Lisbon, Portugal
- Date of death: 13 September 2003 (aged 55)
- Place of death: Lisbon, Portugal
- Height: 1.80 m (5 ft 11 in)
- Position: Goalkeeper

Youth career
- 1961–1966: Sporting CP

Senior career*
Years	Team	Apps	(Gls)
1966–1976	Sporting CP	229	(0)
1976–1980	Racing Santander	131	(0)
1980–1982	Vitória Guimarães	33	(0)
1982–1984	Portimonense	51	(0)
1984–1989	Sporting CP	103	(0)
Total		547	(0)

International career
1969–1986	Portugal	29	(0)

Managerial career
- 1989: Sporting CP (interim)
- 1989–1990: Sporting CP (assistant)
- 1989: Sporting CP (interim)
- 1991–1992: Atlético
- 1999–2000: Lourinhanense
- 2000–2001: Sporting CP B
Medal record
Men's football
Representing Portugal
UEFA European Championship
Bronze medal – third place	1984 France
- * Club domestic league appearances and goals

Vítor Manuel Afonso Damas de Oliveira (8 October 1947 – 13 September 2003), known as Damas, was a Portuguese footballer who played as a goalkeeper.

His 23-year professional career was mainly linked with Sporting CP, but he also played for three other teams, including Racing de Santander in La Liga.

A Portugal international for 17 years, Damas represented the country at the 1986 World Cup and Euro 1984, both in his mid-to-late 30s.

== Club career ==
Born in Lisbon, Damas made his professional debut with his hometown club Sporting CP at the age of just 19. After two years as a backup he became the capital side's undisputed starter, winning two Primeira Liga and three Taça de Portugal trophies, including the double in 1973–74.

Damas moved to Spain in the summer of 1976, signing for Racing de Santander. He was also first choice at the Cantabrians, spending the last of his four seasons in the Segunda División.

Aged 32, Damas returned to Portugal, playing two years apiece with Vitória S.C. and Portimonense SC, after which he rejoined Sporting. He still went on to produce five more respectable campaigns, only losing his status in 1988–89 to Uruguayan Rodolfo Rodríguez.

Following his retirement at 41, Damas remained at Sporting as goalkeepers' coach. Over the course of two separate seasons he acted as their interim manager, overseeing the team in three wins, one draw and two losses.

== International career ==
Damas earned 29 caps for the Portugal national team, from 6 April 1969 to 11 July 1986. He was second choice at both UEFA Euro 1984 and the 1986 FIFA World Cup, backing up S.L. Benfica's Manuel Bento; however, in the latter tournament, the starter suffered a serious fibula injury in training, and he took the pitch for group-stage losses against Poland (1–0) and Morocco (3–1).

== Death ==
Damas died at the age of 55 from cancer, in Lisbon.

== Honours ==
Sporting CP

- Primeira Liga: 1969–70, 1973–74
- Taça de Portugal: 1970–71, 1972–73, 1973–74
- Supertaça Cândido de Oliveira: 1987
