= Artur Jorge (footballer, born 1946) =

Portuguese football manager (1946–2024)

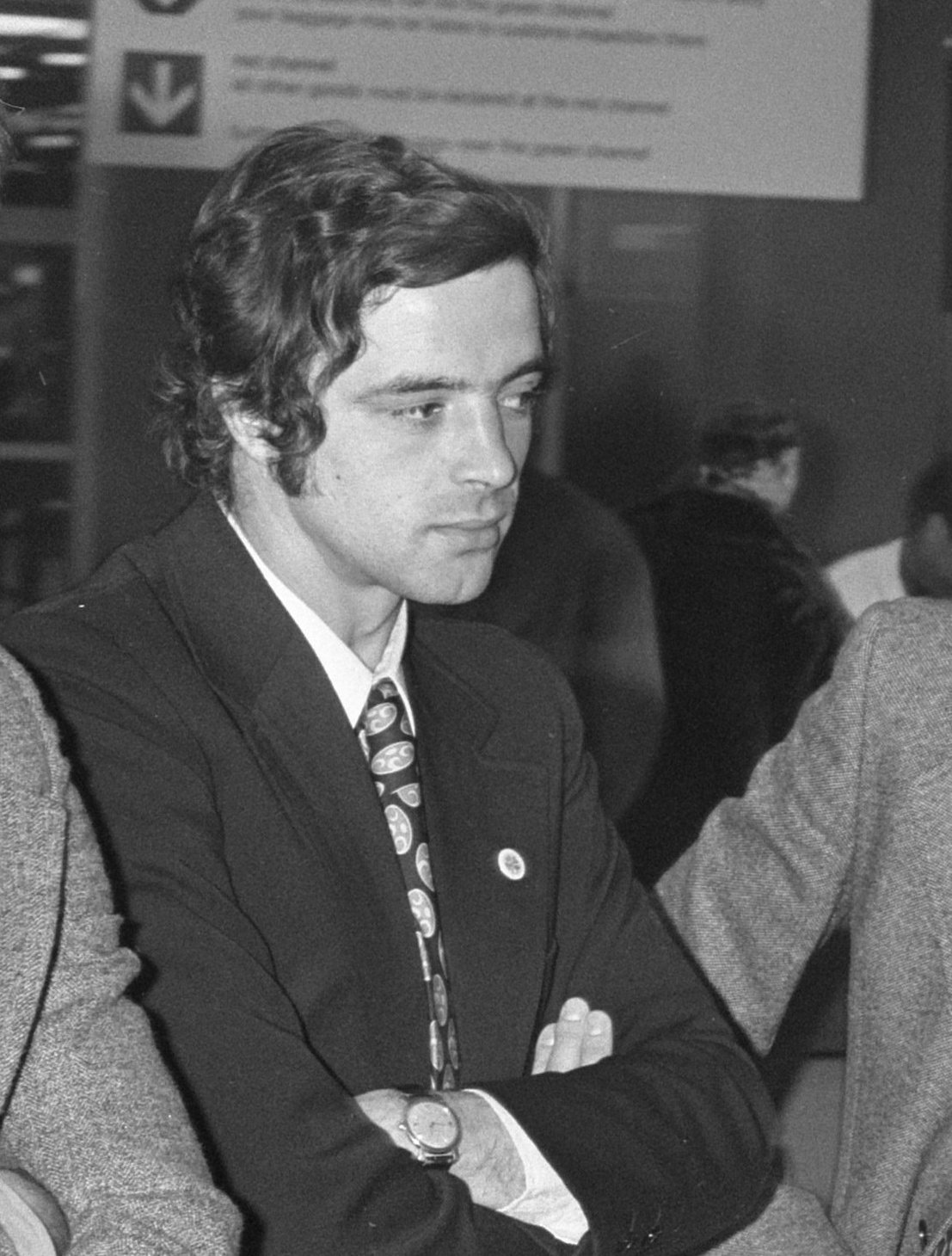
- Artur Jorge in 1972

Personal information
- Full name: Artur Jorge Braga de Melo Teixeira
- Date of birth: 13 February 1946
- Place of birth: Porto, Portugal
- Date of death: 22 February 2024 (aged 78)
- Place of death: Lisbon, Portugal
- Position: Striker

Senior career*
Years	Team	Apps	(Gls)
1964–1965	Porto	4	(1)
1965–1969	Académica	96	(72)
1969–1975	Benfica	130	(105)
1975–1978	Belenenses	51	(14)
1977	→ Rochester Lancers (loan)	7	(2)
Total		288	(194)

International career
1967–1977	Portugal	16	(1)

Managerial career
- 1980–1981: Vitória de Guimarães
- 1981: Belenenses
- 1981–1983: Portimonense
- 1984–1987: Porto
- 1987–1988: Racing Paris
- 1988–1991: Porto
- 1990–1991: Portugal
- 1991–1994: Paris Saint-Germain
- 1994–1995: Benfica
- 1995–1996: Switzerland
- 1996–1997: Portugal
- 1997–1998: Tenerife
- 1998: Vitesse
- 1998–1999: Paris Saint-Germain
- 2000–2001: Al-Nassr
- 2001–2002: Al-Hilal
- 2002–2003: Académica
- 2003–2004: CSKA Moscow
- 2004–2006: Cameroon
- 2006: Al-Nassr
- 2006–2007: Créteil
- 2014–2015: MC Alger
- * Club domestic league appearances and goals

Artur Jorge Braga de Melo Teixeira (13 February 1946 – 22 February 2024), commonly known as Artur Jorge, was a Portuguese football player and manager.

== Club career ==
As a junior player, Artur Jorge started at the junior team of FC Porto. As professional player, he played for Académica de Coimbra and Benfica, before ending his career at Belenenses in the 1977–78 season, due to a serious injury suffered at a training session in the Estádio Nacional where he broke a leg. He also had a stint in the North American Soccer League with the Rochester Lancers.

== Managerial career ==
After his player career, Artur Jorge went to Leipzig, East Germany, to study football and training methodology. He started his managerial career working with Vitória de Guimarães, moving on to Belenenses, Portimonense and then signing with Porto for the 1984–85 season, where he won three national champion titles and two Taça de Portugal titles. His greatest success was to win the European Cup with Porto over favourites Bayern Munich 2–1. Jorge was known as "Rei Artur" ("King Arthur") from then on. He moved to Racing Paris the next season, and returned to Porto in 1989–90. He then moved to Paris Saint-Germain in 1991–92, where he won the national championship in 1993–94.

Artur Jorge moved to Benfica in 1994–95, finishing third with his team, and was replaced at the beginning of the following season. He went to become coach of several other clubs including Académica de Coimbra, Vitesse Arnhem, Tenerife and CSKA Moscow. He managed the Portugal national team, initially while still Porto coach during the 1989–90 and 1990–91 seasons, and again during the 1996–97 season. He also managed the Switzerland team at UEFA Euro 1996, replacing Roy Hodgson under whom they had qualified. From 2004 he managed Cameroon. He failed to lead his team to the 2006 FIFA World Cup. He managed Saudi club Al-Nasr for only two cup matches and was sacked following a 4–1 defeat by lowly club Al-Faisaly. He then managed French second division team Créteil in 2006–07.

On 27 November 2014, Artur Jorge joined Algerian club MC Alger, ending a seven-year period without coaching.

== Death ==
Jorge died on 22 February 2024, at the age of 78.

== Managerial statistics ==
Managerial record by team and tenure
Team	Nat	From	To	Record							
Team	Nat	From	To	G	W	D	L	GF	GA	GD	Win %
Vitória de Guimarães	(Portugal)	1 June 1980	30 May 1981	31	11	9	11	39	32	+7	35.48
Belenenses	(Portugal)	1 June 1981	30 September 1981	5	1	3	1	6	5	+1	20.00
Portimonense	(Portugal)	30 September 1981	30 May 1983	65	28	16	21	81	54	+27	43.08
FC Porto	(Portugal)	18 May 1984	30 May 1987	130	96	18	16	297	80	+217	73.85
Racing	(France)	10 June 1987	30 May 1988	41	13	17	11	36	44	−8	31.71
FC Porto	(Portugal)	12 November 1988	1 June 1991	125	91	21	13	255	71	+184	72.80
Portugal	(Portugal)	1 June 1989	1 June 1990	7	2	2	3	6	10	−4	28.57
PSG	(France)	10 June 1991	30 May 1994	144	78	44	22	215	96	+119	54.17
S.L. Benfica	(Portugal)	1 July 1994	9 September 1995	54	28	15	11	92	45	+47	51.85
Switzerland	(Switzerland)	13 March 1996	18 June 1996	7	1	2	4	5	8	−3	14.29
Portugal	(Portugal)	1 August 1996	30 November 1997	12	5	5	2	12	6	+6	41.67
Vitesse	(Netherlands)	June 1998	October 1998	9	6	2	1	19	9	+10	66.67
PSG	(France)	October 1998	March 1999	23	6	9	8	21	22	−1	26.09
Al-Nassr	(Saudi Arabia)	1 June 2000	1 June 2001	26	13	6	7	36	22	+14	50.00
Al-Hilal	(Saudi Arabia)	1 June 2001	1 June 2002	24	15	7	2	57	21	+36	62.50
Académica de Coimbra	(Portugal)	26 October 2002	28 August 2003	33	12	10	11	47	46	+1	36.36
CSKA Moscow	(Russia)	23 November 2003	4 June 2004	16	8	7	1	27	14	+13	50.00
Cameroon	(Cameroon)	10 January 2005	5 February 2006	11	8	3	0	19	6	+13	72.73
Al-Nassr	(Saudi Arabia)	21 February 2006	4 March 2006	3	0	0	3	4	9	−5	0.00
Créteil	(France)	30 May 2006	30 May 2007	41	10	13	18	36	56	−20	24.39
MC Alger	(Algeria)	3 January 2014	8 October 2015	24	11	7	6	26	16	+10	45.83
Career total				830	443	216	171	1,329	667	+662	53.37

== Honours ==
=== Player ===
Benfica

- Primeira Liga: 1970–71, 1971–72, 1972–73, 1974–75

=== Manager ===
Porto

- Primeira Liga: 1984–85, 1985–86, 1989–90
- Taça de Portugal: 1990–91
- Supertaça Cândido de Oliveira: 1984, 1986, 1990
- European Cup: 1986–87

Paris Saint-Germain

- Division 1: 1993–94
- Coupe de France: 1992–93

Al Hilal

- Saudi Premier League: 2001–02
- Asian Cup Winners' Cup: 2001–02

CSKA Moscow

- Russian Super Cup: 2004
