= José Torres (footballer, born 1938) =

Portuguese footballer and coach

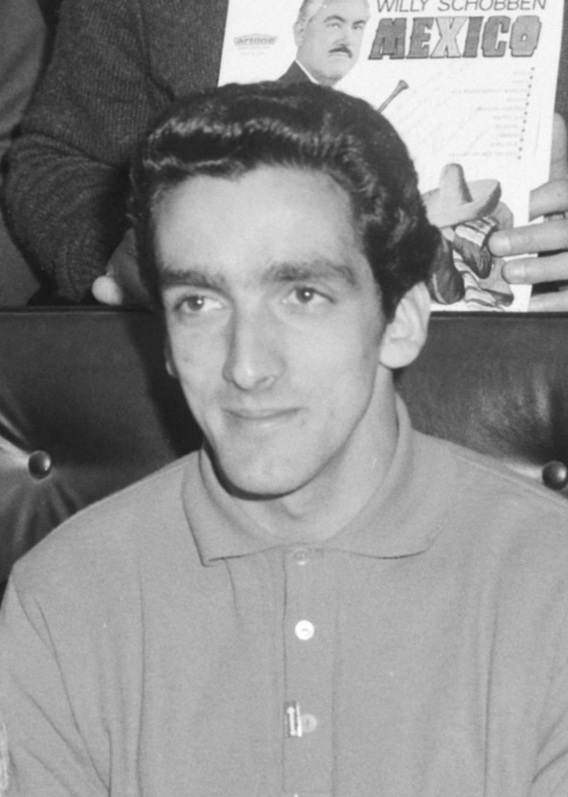
- Torres in 1963

Personal information
- Full name: José Augusto Costa Sénica Torres
- Date of birth: 8 September 1938
- Place of birth: Torres Novas, Portugal
- Date of death: 3 September 2010 (aged 71)
- Place of death: Lisbon, Portugal
- Height: 1.91 m (6 ft 3 in)
- Position: Centre-forward

Youth career
- 1953–1957: Torres Novas

Senior career*
Years	Team	Apps	(Gls)
1957–1959	Torres Novas		
1959–1971	Benfica	172	(151)
1971–1975	Vitória Setúbal	91	(52)
1975–1980	Estoril	111	(14)
Total		374	(217)

International career
1963–1973	Portugal	33	(14)

Managerial career
- 1975: Vitória Setúbal
- 1979–1981: Estoril
- 1981–1982: Estrela Amadora
- 1982–1984: Varzim
- 1984–1986: Portugal
- 1987: Boavista
- 1988–1989: Portimonense
- 1994–1995: Portimonense
- 1996: Desportivo Beja
Medal record
Men's football
Representing Portugal
FIFA World Cup
Third place	1966 England
- * Club domestic league appearances and goals

José Augusto Costa Sénica Torres OM (Portuguese pronunciation: [ʒuˈzɛ ˈtoʁɨʃ]; 8 September 1938 – 3 September 2010), nicknamed "O Bom Gigante" ("The Kind Giant"), was a Portuguese football centre-forward and coach. Most of his 21-year senior career was spent at Benfica, with great individual and team success (13 major titles). With the Portugal national team, he participated in two World Cups separated by 20 years, one as player and the other as manager.

== Club career ==
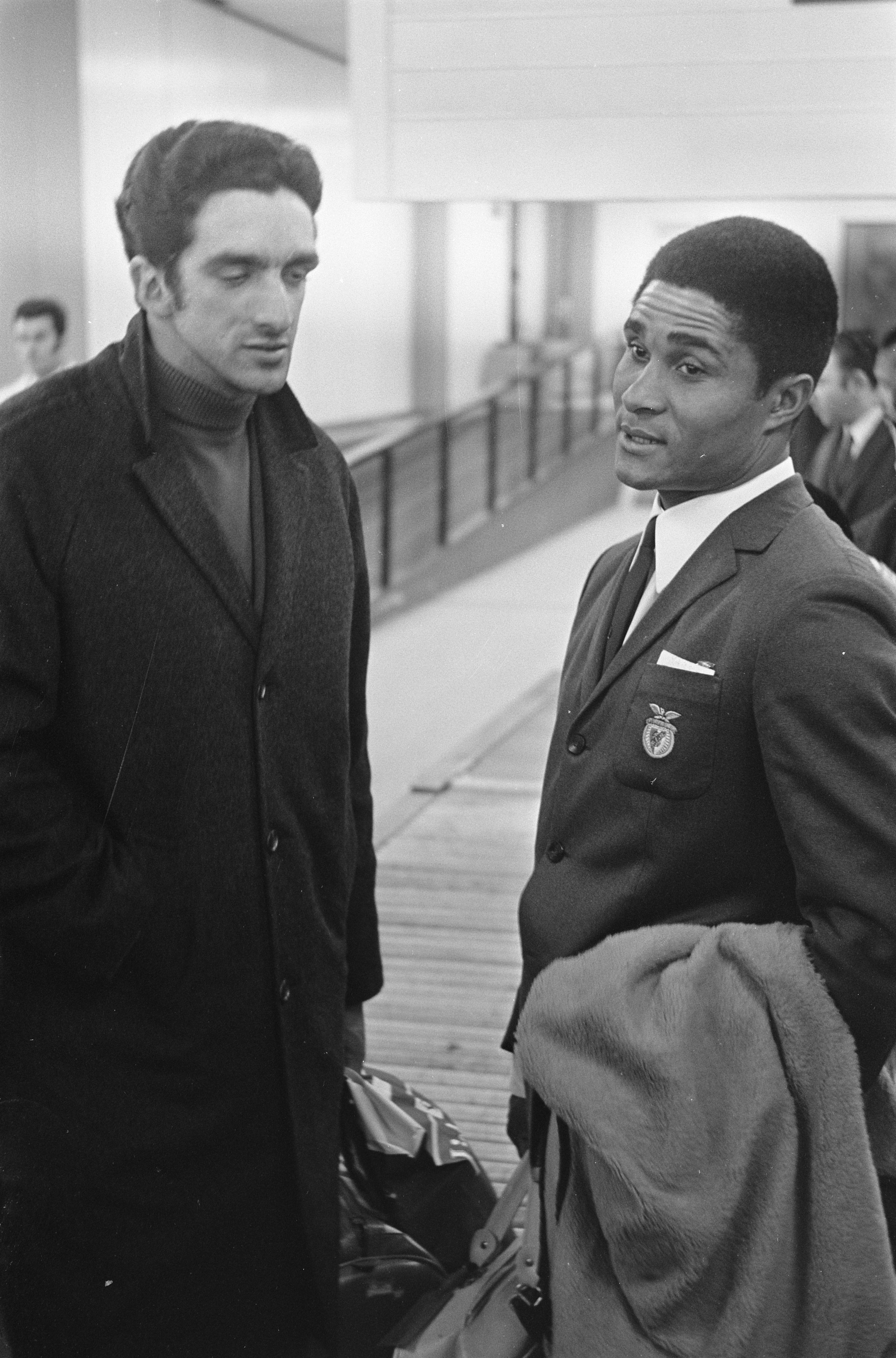
Torres (left) with Eusébio in 1969

Born in Torres Novas, Santarém District, Torres signed with S.L. Benfica in 1959, from local Clube Desportivo de Torres Novas. Even though he featured rarely in his first three seasons, he managed to score six Primeira Liga goals in as many games, paving the way for a bright future.

In the 1962–63 season, in only 21 appearances, Torres was crowned the competition's top scorer after netting 26 goals, whilst also helping the league champions to the Taça de Portugal final. It was also during this decade that he would be an instrumental figure as they reached three European Cup finals, alongside attacking partners José Augusto, Mário Coluna, Eusébio and António Simões.

Torres left Benfica in 1971 at nearly 33 years of age, being involved in a deal that sent him and two teammates to Vitória de Setúbal and promising Vítor Baptista in the opposite direction. He scored an average of 13 goals per season for his next club, always in the top division – he also briefly acted as the team's player-coach in 1975 – then ended his career three months before his 42nd birthday after four years at another side in Lisbon, G.D. Estoril Praia, again at that level, suffering relegation in his last year; in 21 seasons in the competition he amassed totals of 374 games and 217 goals, surpassing the 200 mark for Benfica alone.

Torres worked as a manager in the following years, without much success. His biggest achievement was help modest Varzim S.C. to two consecutive finishes outside the relegation zone in the top tier (1982–84).

== International career ==
Torres earned 33 caps for Portugal, scoring 14 goals. His debut came on 23 January 1963 in a 1–0 loss against Bulgaria for the 1964 European Nations' Cup qualification, a third-game replay. He was selected for the 1966 FIFA World Cup in England – as Augusto, Coluna, Eusébio and Simões – where he played all the matches and scored three goals, including the 2–1 winner over the Soviet Union in the third-place playoff, through his main asset, a header.

Torres' last game was a 2–2 draw, again against Bulgaria for the 1974 World Cup qualifiers, on 13 October 1973 (at the age of 35). It would also be longtime club and national teammates Eusébio and Simões' last international appearance.

After leaving Varzim, aged 46, Torres was named national team manager. In the last match of the 1986 World Cup qualifiers in West Germany, Portugal needed a win to qualify. Prior to the game in Stuttgart he uttered "Please allow me to dream", and his side eventually won it 1–0 thanks to a Carlos Manuel goal; the finals in Mexico, however, would be marred by the Saltillo Affair, with Portugal being eliminated after the first round.

== Later years and death ==
Torres settled in Lisbon with his wife after his retirement from the football world, with pigeon racing as his main hobby. On 3 September 2010, just five days short of his 72nd birthday and after a long battle with Alzheimer's disease, he died from heart failure.

== Career statistics ==
=== International ===
José Augusto Torres: International goals
No.	Date	Venue	Opponent	Score	Result	Competition
1	29 April 1964	Hardturm, Zurich, Switzerland	Switzerland	0–1	2–3	Friendly
2	17 May 1964	Estádio Nacional, Lisbon, Portugal	England	1–0	3–4	Friendly
3	17 May 1964	Estádio Nacional, Lisbon, Portugal	England	2–2	3–4	Friendly
4	18 June 1966	Hampden Park, Glasgow, Scotland	Scotland	0–1	0–1	Friendly
5	21 June 1966	Idrætsparken, Copenhagen, Denmark	Denmark	0–2	1–3	Friendly
6	21 June 1966	Idrætsparken, Copenhagen, Denmark	Denmark	1–3	1–3	Friendly
7	26 June 1966	Estádio Nacional, Lisbon, Portugal	Uruguay	1–0	3–0	Friendly
8	26 June 1966	Estádio Nacional, Lisbon, Portugal	Uruguay	2–0	3–0	Friendly
9	26 June 1966	Estádio Nacional, Lisbon, Portugal	Uruguay	3–0	3–0	Friendly
10	3 July 1966	Estádio das Antas, Porto, Portugal	Romania	1–0	1–0	Friendly
11	13 July 1966	Old Trafford, Manchester, England	Hungary	3–1	3–1	1966 FIFA World Cup
12	16 July 1966	Old Trafford, Manchester, England	Bulgaria	3–0	3–0	1966 FIFA World Cup
13	28 July 1966	Wembley Stadium (1923), London, England	Soviet Union	2–1	2–1	1966 FIFA World Cup
14	12 November 1967	Estádio das Antas, Porto, Portugal	Norway	1–0	2–1	Euro 1968 qualifying

== Honours ==
Benfica

- Primeira Liga: 1959–60, 1960–61, 1962–63, 1963–64, 1964–65, 1966–67, 1967–68, 1968–69, 1970–71
- Taça de Portugal: 1961–62, 1963–64, 1968–69, 1969–70
- Taça de Honra (3)
- European Cup runner-up: 1962–63, 1964–65, 1967–68

Portugal

- FIFA World Cup third place: 1966

Individual

- Primeira Liga top scorer: 1962–63
- European Cup top scorer: 1964–65

Orders

- Officer of the Order of Merit

== See also ==
- List of men's footballers with 500 or more goals
