= José Henrique =

Portuguese footballer (born 1943)

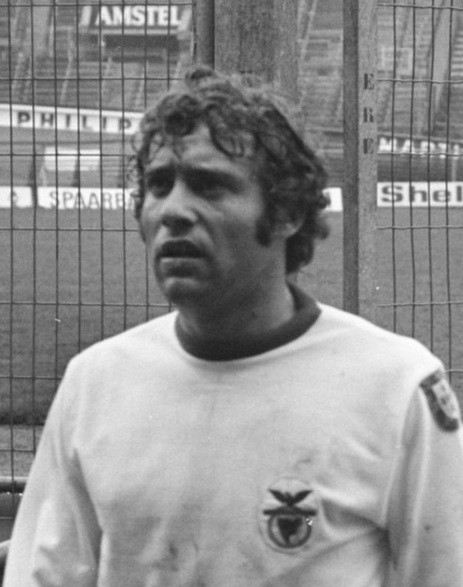
- José Henrique in 1972

Personal information
- Full name: José Henrique Rodrigues Marques
- Date of birth: 18 May 1943 (age 83)
- Place of birth: Arrentela, Portugal
- Position: Goalkeeper

Youth career
- 1957–1959: Arrentela
- 1959–1961: Benfica

Senior career*
Years	Team	Apps	(Gls)
1961–1964	Amora		
1964–1965	Seixal	12	(0)
1965–1966	Atlético		
1966–1979	Benfica	216	(0)
1971	→ Toronto Metros (loan)	8	(0)
1979–1981	Nacional	50	(0)
1981–1982	Covilhã	2	(0)
Total		288	(0)

International career
1969–1973	Portugal	15	(0)

Managerial career
- 1981–1982: Covilhã (player-coach)
- * Club domestic league appearances and goals

José Henrique Rodrigues Marques (born 18 May 1943), known as José Henrique, is a Portuguese retired footballer.

A goalkeeper, he was best known for his successful spell at Benfica, being nicknamed Zé Gato (Joe Cat). He appeared in 299 official games with the club, winning 11 major titles.

== Club career ==
Born in Arrentela, Seixal, Setúbal, José Henrique first played at Amora (three seasons), then with Seixal and Atlético (one apiece), all clubs in the Lisbon area. Subsequently, he signed with local Benfica, where he would remain the following 13 years – he had already played youth football there for two years; he also had a short stint with the Toronto Metros, in the North American Soccer League.

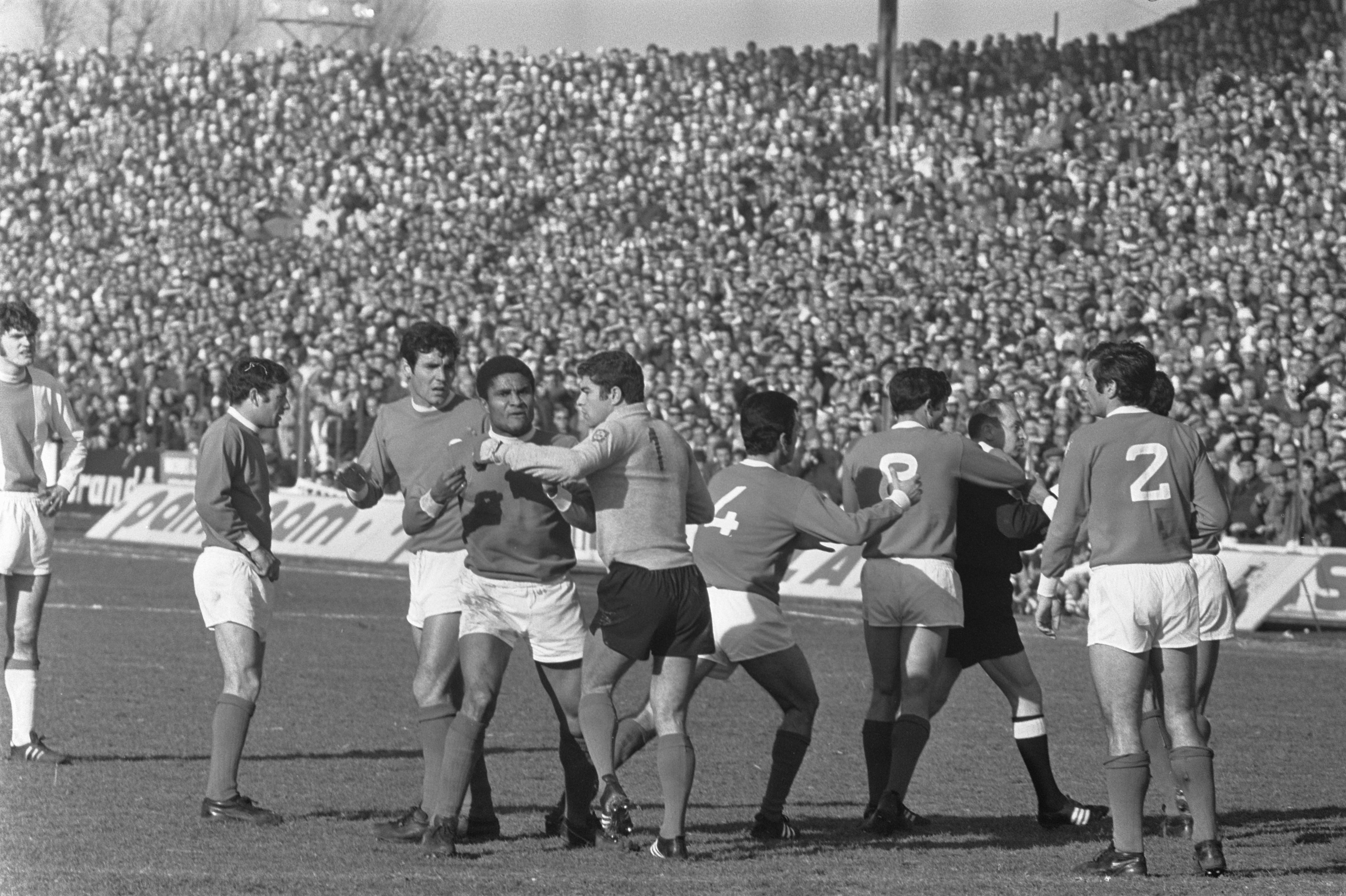
José Henrique in action for Benfica against Ajax (Paris, 1969, European Cup play-off)

In Benfica's back-to-back Primeira Liga wins from 1971 to 1973, José Henrique was instrumental in helping the squad attain its defensive record: 60 matches with only one loss and 29 goals conceded. He had to share first-choice duties in the next years with another club great, Manuel Bento, eventually losing his position in 1976 after having won eight leagues and three cups; he also appeared in the 1967–68 European Cup final, lost 1–4 to Manchester United in extra time.

From 1979 to 1982, José Henrique competed in the second level with Nacional (two years) and Covilhã, retiring at 39. Still active, he became a manager with his last team, subsequently returning to Benfica, where he went on to work as a goalkeeper coach with the youth sides.

== International career ==
José Henrique played 15 times for Portugal, his debut coming on 10 December 1969 in a 0–1 friendly defeat with England. His last match took place on 13 October 1973 in a 2–2 draw against Bulgaria for the 1974 FIFA World Cup qualifiers – it would also be longtime Benfica teammate Eusébio's last cap.

The peak of José Henrique's international career was at the Brazil Independence Cup in 1972, where he helped the national team finish second to the hosts, only succumbing to a last-minute goal (0–1). During his career, however, he suffered stiff competition from Sporting CP's Vítor Damas.

== Honours ==
Benfica

- Primeira Liga: 1967–68, 1968–69, 1970–71, 1971–72, 1972–73, 1974–75, 1975–76, 1976–77
- Taça de Portugal: 1968–69, 1969–70, 1971–72
- Taça de Honra (4)
- European Cup: Runner-up 1967–68
