= 1970–71 Primeira Divisão =

37th season of top-tier Portuguese football

Primeira Liga
- Season: 1970–71
- Champions: Benfica; 18th title
- Matches: 182
- Goals: 426 (2.34 per match)

The 1970–71 Primeira Divisão was the 37th season of top-tier football in Portugal.

== Overview ==
It was contested by 14 teams, and S.L. Benfica won the championship.

== League standings ==
Pos	Team	Pld	W	D	L	GF	GA	GD	Pts	Qualification or relegation
1	Benfica (C)	26	18	5	3	62	17	+45	41	Qualification to European Cup first round
2	Sporting CP	26	16	6	4	45	14	+31	38	Qualification to Cup Winners' Cup first round (Note: Sporting qualified for the Cup Winners' Cup as winners of the 1971 Taça de Portugal Final)
3	Porto	26	16	5	5	44	21	+23	37	Qualification to UEFA Cup first round
4	Vitória de Setúbal	26	15	4	7	51	16	+35	34	Qualification to UEFA Cup first round
5	Académica	26	13	7	6	38	24	+14	33	Qualification to UEFA Cup first round
6	Boavista	26	9	4	13	18	38	−20	22	
7	Belenenses	26	7	8	11	20	27	−7	22	
8	CUF Barreiro	26	8	5	13	28	37	−9	21	
9	Tirsense	26	6	8	12	24	45	−21	20	
10	Barreirense	26	5	10	11	21	31	−10	20	
11	Farense	26	7	6	13	15	33	−18	20	
12	Vitória de Guimarães	26	4	11	11	15	27	−12	19	
13	Leixões	26	7	5	14	22	44	−22	19	
14	Varzim (R)	26	7	4	15	23	52	−29	18	Relegation to Segunda Divisão

Source: RSSSF
(C) Champions; (R) Relegated

== Results ==
Home \ Away	ACA	BAR	BEL	BEN	BOA	CUF	FAR	LEI	POR	SCP	TIR	VAR	VGU	VSE
Académica		2–0	0–0	0–0	3–1	5–1	3–1	2–1	3–2	0–0	3–1	4–0	1–0	1–0
Barreirense	0–0		1–1	0–2	2–1	3–0	1–0	0–0	0–2	0–3	0–0	4–0	1–1	0–4
Belenenses	0–2	0–0		1–1	1–2	3–1	1–0	3–0	1–2	0–0	0–0	1–0	3–1	1–0
Benfica	5–1	1–0	3–1		4–0	1–0	5–0	5–0	2–2	5–1	7–0	3–0	1–0	1–0
Boavista	0–1	1–0	0–0	0–3		3–2	0–1	1–1	0–1	1–0	1–0	1–1	2–0	1–0
CUF Barreiro	2–1	0–0	2–0	0–2	0–1		2–0	7–1	1–0	0–2	2–1	2–0	0–0	0–3
Farense	2–2	1–1	1–0	1–0	0–0	1–1		1–0	1–0	1–2	1–0	0–0	2–0	0–0
Leixões	0–0	1–0	2–0	1–2	0–1	1–0	1–0		1–2	0–2	2–0	5–0	0–0	2–1
Porto	0–0	2–2	1–0	4–0	1–0	2–0	3–0	4–1		2–1	3–0	4–2	0–0	2–1
Sporting CP	1–0	0–1	2–0	1–1	8–0	2–1	1–0	4–0	2–1		2–0	5–1	4–0	1–0
Tirsense	1–0	3–2	3–1	2–4	1–0	1–1	2–0	3–1	1–2	0–0		1–1	2–2	0–0
Varzim	2–1	3–2	2–0	0–4	2–0	1–1	1–0	3–1	0–2	0–1	4–1		0–2	0–1
Vitória de Guimarães	1–2	1–1	0–1	0–0	1–0	0–2	1–0	0–0	0–0	0–0	0–0	3–0		2–3
Vitória de Setúbal	3–1	2–0	1–1	2–0	5–1	3–0	6–1	3–0	2–0	0–0	6–1	3–0	2–0	

Legend: Blue = home team win; Yellow = draw; Red = away team win.

== Season statistics ==
=== Top goalscorers ===
Rank	Player	Club	Goals
1	(Portugal) Artur Jorge	Benfica	23
2	(Portugal) Vítor Baptista	Vitória de Setúbal	22
3	(Portugal) Eusébio	Benfica	19
4	(Portugal) António Lemos	Porto	18
5	(Portugal) Félix Guerreiro	Vitória de Setúbal	12
6	(Portugal) Abel	Porto	11
7	(Portugal) Manuel António	Académica de Coimbra	10
8	(Portugal) António Jorge	Académica de Coimbra	8
8	(Portugal) Esteves	Leixões	8
8	(Portugal) Nunes Pinto	Varzim	8
