= U.F.C.I. Tomar =

Portuguese football club

UFCI Tomar
- Full name: União Futebol Comércio e Indústria de Tomar
- Founded: 1914; 112 years ago
- Ground: Estádio Municipal de Tomar, Tomar
- Capacity: 500
- Chairman: Abel Bento
- League: AF Santarém League 1
- 2023–24: Campeonato de Portugal, 13th ▼
Home colours	Away colours

União Futebol Comércio e Indústria de Tomar, or more commonly União de Tomar, is a Portuguese association football club formed on 4 May 1914 and based in the city of Tomar. The club spent a total of six seasons in the Portuguese Liga, Portugal's top division, and won the Portuguese Second Division in 1974. It is the only club from Santarém District to have competed in the Primeira Liga.

== Appearances ==
- Premier Division: 6
- Segunda Divisão: 16
- Terceira Divisão: 19
- Portuguese Cup: 34
  - 5 times in the 1/4 finals
  - once in the 1/8 finals
  - one in the 1/16 finals
  - 11 times in the 1/32 finals

== Season to season ==
- 1940–43: Segunda Divisão
- 1960–65: Terceira Divisão
- 1965–68: Segunda Divisão
- 1968–69: 10th (Tier 1)
- 1969–70: 14th (Tier 1)
- 1970–71: Tier 2
- 1971–72: 12th
- 1972–73: 16th
- 1973–74: Tier 2 (South Zone)
- 1974–75: 13th
- 1975–76: 14th
- 1976–80: Tier 2
- 1980–83: Terceira Divisão
- 1893-84: Segunda Divisão
- 1984–85: Terceira Divisão
- 1987–88: AF Santarém
- 1988–90: Terceira Divisão
- 1990–93: Segunda Divisão
- 1993–97: Terceira Divisão
- 1997–98: AF Santarém
- 1998–2002: Terceira Divisão
- 2002–present: AF Santarém

== Notable players ==
- (Portugal) Vítor Baptista
- (Portugal) José Ribeiro
- (Portugal) António Simões

== Managers ==
- 1964–1966: (Argentina) Di Paola
- 1967–1970: (Argentina) Oscar Tellechea
- 1970–1972: (Portugal) Fernando Cabrita
- 1972–1973: (Portugal) António Medeiros / (Argentina) Enrique Vega
- 1973–1975: (Portugal) Artur Santos
- 1975–1976: (Portugal) Francisco Andrade

== Honours ==
- Segunda Divisão (South Zone):

- 1974

- Terceira Divisão:
  1964/65
  - Série D:

- 1982/83
- 1989/90
