= António Simões =

Portuguese footballer (born 1943)

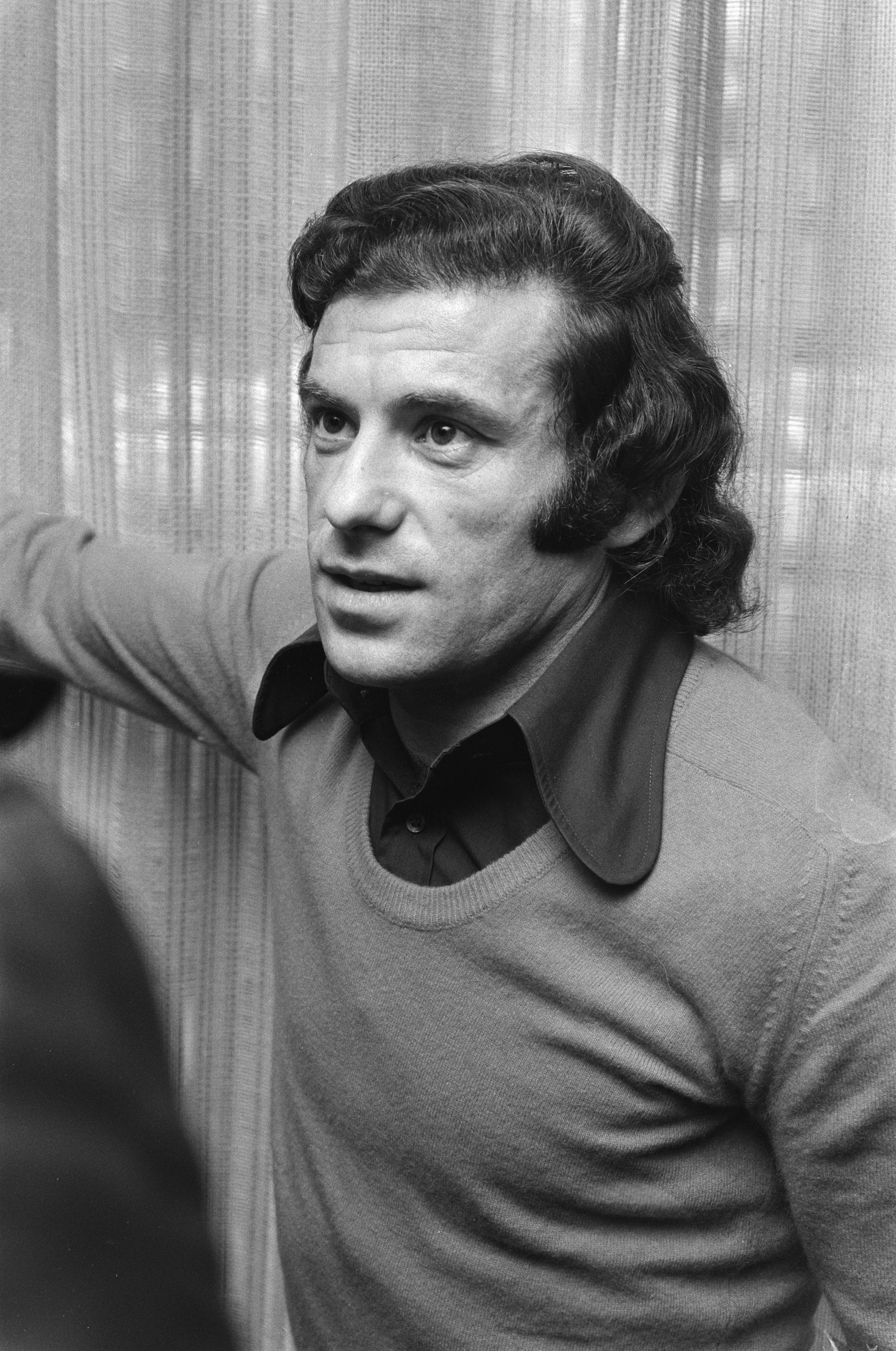
- Simões in 1975

Personal information
- Full name: António Simões da Costa
- Date of birth: 14 December 1943 (age 82)
- Place of birth: Corroios, Portugal
- Height: 1.67 m (5 ft 6 in)
- Position: Winger

Youth career
- 1957–1959: Almada
- 1959–1961: Benfica

Senior career*
Years	Team	Apps	(Gls)
1961–1975	Benfica	312	(46)
1975–1976	Boston Minutemen	27	(5)
1975–1976	Estoril	6	(0)
1976–1977	San Jose Earthquakes	33	(0)
1977–1978	União Tomar	16	(1)
1978	New Jersey Americans	4	(0)
1979	Dallas Tornado	6	(1)
1979–1980	Detroit Lightning (indoor)	2	(0)
1980–1981	Chicago Horizon (indoor)	20	(7)
1981–1982	Kansas City Comets (indoor)	3	(0)
Total		429	(60)

International career
1962–1973	Portugal	46	(3)

Managerial career
- 1982–1984: Phoenix Inferno
- 1984–1985: Las Vegas Americans (assistant)
- 1987–1991: Austin Sockadillos
- 2003–2004: União Madeira
- 2004–2005: Lusitânia
- 2008–2010: Portugal Olympic
- 2011–2014: Iran (assistant)
- 2012–2014: Iran B
Medal record
Men's football
Representing Portugal
FIFA World Cup
Third place	1966 England
- * Club domestic league appearances and goals

António Simões da Costa (European Portuguese pronunciation: [ɐ̃ˈtɔni.u siˈmõjʃ, ɐ̃ˈtɔnju -]; born 14 December 1943), known as Simões, is a Portuguese former footballer who played as a left winger.

He spent 14 professional seasons with Benfica, playing 449 official games and scoring 72 goals. In the late 1970s and early 1980s he represented several teams in the United States, and subsequently worked as a manager in both continents.

Simões played more than 40 times for Portugal, including appearing at the 1966 World Cup.

== Club career ==
=== Benfica ===
Born in Corroios, Seixal, Setúbal District, Simões joined S.L. Benfica when he was 15, and was already an important first-team member just two years later, being part of the squads that won ten Primeira Liga championships and one European Cup. In the 1962 final of the latter competition, a 5–3 win against Real Madrid, he became the youngest ever player to conquer the tournament, at 18 years and four months.

Simões left Benfica at the end of the 1974–75 season after winning his last league. He contributed 26 scoreless matches in the process.

=== United States ===
Simões moved to the United States at the age of 32, signing with the Boston Minutemen of the North American Soccer League. He spent two seasons in the city before moving to the San Jose Earthquakes in 1976, and subsequently the Dallas Tornado.

In 1979, Simões joined Major Indoor Soccer League club Detroit Lightning. After one season he moved to the Chicago Horizon, before finishing his career with the Kansas City Comets; he returned twice to his country during the off-season period, briefly representing G.D. Estoril Praia and U.F.C.I. Tomar.

Immediately after quitting football, Simões was hired as coach of the Phoenix Inferno of the MISL. He was dismissed in March 1984 and replaced by Ted Podleski, joining the Las Vegas Americans as assistant to Alan Mayer afterwards and also leaving in January 1985; in 1989, he was the SISL indoor season coach of the year with the Austin Sockadillos.

== International career ==
Simões made his debut with the Portugal national team on 6 May 1962, in a 2–1 friendly defeat to Brazil in São Paulo. He was a member of the squad that finished third in the 1966 FIFA World Cup in England, scoring the first goal in the group stage opener against the same opponent (3–1 win).

The recipient of 46 caps with three goals, Simões missed the Brazil Independence Cup due to injury. He made his last appearance on 13 October 1973, in a 2–2 home draw against Bulgaria for the 1974 World Cup qualifiers.

Simões joined Iran's coaching staff in April 2011, acting as assistant to compatriot Carlos Queiroz. He left in February 2014, for personal reasons.

António Simões: International goals
No.	Date	Venue	Opponent	Score	Result	Competition
1	29 April 1964	Hardturm, Zurich, Switzerland	Switzerland	0–2	2–3	Friendly
2	19 July 1966	Goodison Park, Liverpool, England	Brazil	1–0	3–1	1966 FIFA World Cup
3	13 October 1973	Estádio da Luz (1954), Lisbon, Portugal	Bulgaria	1–0	2–2	1974 World Cup qualification

== Style of play ==
A diminutive winger known for his above-average skills, creativity and crossing, able to play with both feet, Simões holds the record of youngest player (18 years and 139 days old) to play and win a European Cup final, when he appeared for Benfica against Real Madrid on 2 May 1962.

== Honours ==
Benfica

- Primeira Divisão: 1962–63, 1963–64, 1964–65, 1966–67, 1967–68, 1968–69, 1970–71, 1971–72, 1972–73, 1974–75
- Taça de Portugal (4)
- European Cup: 1961–62
- Intercontinental Cup runner-up: 1961, 1962

Portugal

- UEFA European Under-18 Championship: 1961
- FIFA World Cup third place: 1966
