= 1972–73 S.L. Benfica season =

Benfica
1972–73 season
- President: Borges Coutinho
- Head coach: Jimmy Hagan
- Stadium: Estádio da Luz
- Primeira Divisão: 1st
- Taça de Portugal: Sixth round
- European Cup: Second round
- Top goalscorer: League: Eusébio (40); All: Eusébio (42)
Home colours

The 1972–73 season was Sport Lisboa e Benfica's 69th season in existence and the club's 39th consecutive season in the top flight of Portuguese football, covering the period from 1 July 1972 to 30 June 1973. Benfica competed domestically in the Primeira Divisão and the Taça de Portugal, and participated in the European Cup after winning the previous league.

After securing back-to-back league titles, Jimmy Hagan remained for a third year. Benfica signed Manuel Bento, Nelinho and brought back Augusto Matine. A late start to the pre-season did not hurt Benfica domestically, who started his league campaign with easy wins. However, in the European Cup, after passing Malmö FF, they lost 3–0 on aggregate with Derby County in the second round and were knocked-out. Leaving only the domestic competitions to battle for, Benfica kept his winning pace and recorded win after win, despite difficult wins against Porto in November and CUF in December. Lapping the first half of the season with 15 wins in 15 games, Benfica already had an eight-point lead over second place Belenenses. Another hard-fought win followed with Beira-Mar in January, but Benfica remained undisturbed and with 23 consecutive wins, they won their 20th league title on 11 March. They were finally stopped by Porto in Estádio das Antas on 1 April, but still a European record for most consecutive domestic wins with 29, dating back to April 1972. A week later, they also lost their domestic invincibility when Leixões defeated them for the Portuguese Cup, ending over one-year of undefeated streak. In final part of the season, Benfica drew again with Atlético but remained undefeated winning 28 games in 30, setting a record for longest distance for second place with 18 points. Eusébio with 40 goals was the European Golden Shoe for his second time.

== Season summary ==
Benfica started the new season as back-to-back champions and Taça de Portugal holders. For the third year of Jimmy Hagan, Benfica made some squad adjustments, signing a promising young goalkeeper; Manuel Bento, another right winger; Nelinho and bringing back Augusto Matine, who excelled at Vitória de Setúbal. Hagan's staff also changed, with assistant manager José Augusto resigning, being replaced by Fernando Cabrita. The pre-season only started on 16 August because 12 players of Benfica took part in the Brazil Independence Cup, so their vacation was pushed forward. At the end of the competition on 9 July, they all returned to Benfica to play two friendlies with Sporting in Foxborough, Massachusetts, on 16 and 23 July. Benfica's preparations included the Ramón de Carranza Trophy on 26 and 27 August, and they completed the pre-season with a tour in Indonesia.

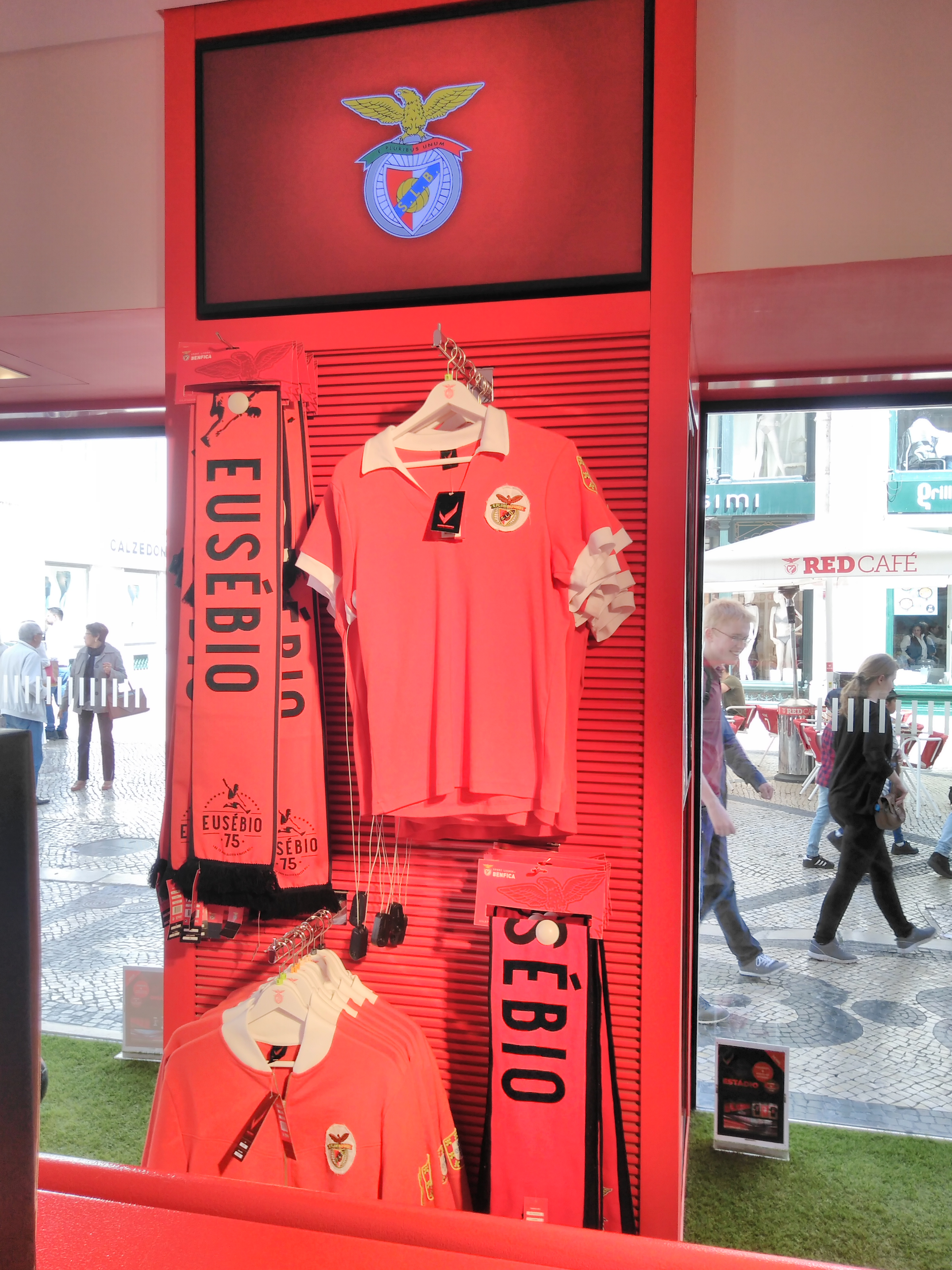
Replica of the shirt used in this time period

The league campaign started on 9 September, with a home win with Leixões. On the following Wednesday, Benfica also began his European Cup campaign, losing 1–0 with Malmö FF. In the return leg, Benfica beat them by 4–1 and qualified for the second round. In the domestic campaign, on 8 October, Benfica defeated Sporting by 4–1 with four goals from Eusébio. With the win, Benfica opened a two-point lead over their rivals. They continued on their winning run, beating Belenenses at home by 5–0 on match-day 7. With seven wins in seven matches, their lead was now three points. Back on the European stage, Benfica visited Baseball Ground to face Derby County on 25 October. Three first-half goals from Derby County surprised Benfica, who failed to react and lost 3–0. Before the second leg, Benfica played the Clássico with Porto for the Primeira Divisão. Porto scored first and was winning by 2–0 until the 78th minute, when Benfica scored the 1–2 with the result eventually being a 3–2 win for Benfica. Three days later, on 8 November, Benfica was knocked-out of the European Cup after a 0–0 draw with Derby County. Now solely focused on the league campaign, Benfica kept their winning record in November after beating Vitória de Guimarães, ending the month with a six-point lead over Belenenses. In early December, the team was nearly stopped by CUF, if it was not for a 90th-minute goal from Eusébio. On 17 December, Benfica finished the first half of the season with an away win against Montijo. Accounting for wins all the matches played, Benfica had now an eight-point lead over second place Belenenses and had scored 49 goals and conceded just five. Before closing December, Benfica conquered another Taça de Honra by beating Atlético on penalties.

In the opening month of 1973, Benfica again experienced a difficult away win, the opponent being Beira-Mar. Artur Jorge scored the winning goal on the 87th minute. With 18 wins in 18 match-days, Benfica's lead at this point was nine points. They closed the month with an away win in Estádio de Alvalade against Sporting. Benfica had now a 10-point advantage over Belenenses and 16 over Sporting. In February, the team went on a tour in South east Asia, playing in Hong Kong, Macau and Jakarta. The Primeira Divisão resumed in latter part of the month and for the last match in February, Benfica visited Estádio do Restelo to face Belenenses. They defeated them by 2–0. With 22 wins in 22 matches, Benfica's lead was now 13 points. On 11 March, on match-day 23, Benfica beat Vitória de Setúbal at home by 3–0. With a 14–point lead with seven match-days to go, Benfica secured their 20th league title after 23 consecutive wins. Having already won the league, Benfica visited Estádio das Antas on 1 April, to play Porto. They drew 2–2 after a controversial late penalty signalled by António Garrido, stopping their winning run. Still, Benfica had set a European record for consecutive wins in domestic league. It had started on 9 April 1972, on match-day 25 from 1971–72 and lasted nearly a full year. Competition continued on 8 April, with Benfica facing Leixões for the Portuguese Cup. They lost 2–0 and ended one-year and 13 days of domestic invincibility. The final part of the season was solely focused on making Eusébio win the European Golden Shoe, as Müller was his main contestant. After another four wins and second draw, with Atlético, Müller and Eusébio were tied with 36 goals, leaving everything for the last match-day. With four goals in a 6–0 win over Montijo, Eusébio reached 40 and confirmed his second Golden Shoe. Benfica had ended the league undefeated with 28 wins and two draws, 58 points in 60 possible, 18 points ahead of second place, setting a new domestic record for difference over second place. They also scored 101 goals and conceded only 13, a goal difference of 88 goals.

== Competitions ==
Win Draw Loss Postponed

=== Overall record ===
Competition	First match	Last match	Record								
Competition	First match	Last match	G	W	D	L	GF	GA	GD	Win %	Source
Primeira Divisão	9 September 1972	10 June 1973	30	28	2	0	101	13	+88	93.33	
Taça de Portugal	18 March 1973	8 April 1973	2	1	0	1	4	4	+0	50.00	
European Cup	13 September 1972	8 November 1972	4	1	1	2	4	5	−1	25.00	
Total			36	30	3	3	109	22	+87	83.33	

=== Primeira Divisão ===
==== League table ====
Pos	Team	Pld	W	D	L	GF	GA	GD	Pts	Qualification or relegation
1	Benfica (C)	30	28	2	0	101	13	+88	58	Qualification to European Cup first round
2	Belenenses	30	14	12	4	53	30	+23	40	Qualification to UEFA Cup first round
3	Vitória de Setúbal	30	16	6	8	65	26	+39	38	Qualification to UEFA Cup first round
4	Porto	30	15	7	8	56	28	+28	37	Qualification to UEFA Cup first round
5	Sporting CP	30	15	7	8	57	31	+26	37	Qualification to Cup Winners' Cup first round

Source: RSSSF and footballzz.co.uk
Rules for classification: 1) points; 2) goal difference; 3) number of goals scored.
(C) Champions

==== Results by round ====
Round	1	2	3	4	5	6	7	8	9	10	11	12	13	14	15	16	17	18	19	20	21	22	23	24	25	26	27	28	29	30
Ground	H	A	H	A	H	A	H	A	H	A	H	A	A	H	A	A	H	A	H	A	H	A	H	A	H	A	H	H	A	H
Result	W	W	W	W	W	W	W	W	W	W	W	W	W	W	W	W	W	W	W	W	W	W	W	D	W	W	W	W	D	W
Position	1	1	1	1	1	1	1	1	1	1	1	1	1	1	1	1	1	1	1	1	1	1	1	1	1	1	1	1	1	1

Source: ForaDeJogo
A = Away; H = Home; W = Win; D = Draw; L = Loss

==== Matches ====
9 September 1972 1	Benfica	6–0	Leixões	Lisbon
16:00	Artur Jorge 12', 45'; Eusébio 20', 23', 36'; Nené 57'	Report		Stadium: Estádio da Luz; Referee: Ismael Baltasar

17 September 1972 2	Boavista	1–3	Benfica	Porto
18:00	Moinhos 68'	Report	Artur Jorge 10'; Eusébio 53', 86'	Stadium: Estádio do Bessa; Referee: António Espanhol

24 September 1972 3	Benfica	9–0	Beira-Mar	Lisbon
18:00	Jordão 12', 29', 89'; Eusébio 17', 24', 75'; Nené 48'; Jaime Graça 70'; Simões 78'	Report		Stadium: Estádio da Luz; Referee: Inácio Almeida

1 October 1972 4	União de Coimbra	0–4	Benfica	Coimbra
18:00		Report	35' Jordão; 64' Toni; 76' Eusébio; 84' Adolfo	Stadium: Estádio Municipal de Coimbra; Referee: Fernando Leite

8 October 1972 5	Benfica	4–1	Sporting	Lisbon
18:00	Eusébio 25', 34', 86', 89'	Report	Yazalde 84'	Stadium: Estádio da Luz; Referee: Francisco Lobo

15 October 1972 6	Barreirense	0–3	Benfica	Barreiro
18:00		Report	Humberto Coelho 55'; Nené 61', 64'	Stadium: Campo D. Manuel de Melo; Referee: António Garrido

22 October 1972 7	Benfica	5–0	Belenenses	Lisbon
18:00	Simões 29'; Jaime Graça 51'; Eusébio 58', 59', 82'	Report		Stadium: Estádio da Luz; Referee: César Correia

29 October 1972 8	Vitória de Setúbal	0–1	Benfica	Setúbal
18:00		Report	Vítor Baptista 51'	Stadium: Estádio do Bonfim; Referee: Fernando Leite

5 November 1972 9	Benfica	3–2	Porto	Lisbon
19:00	Vítor Baptista 78'; Jaime Graça 79'; Humberto Coelho 90'	Report	Abel 21'; Flávio 63'	Stadium: Estádio da Luz; Referee: Ismael Baltasar

12 November 1972 10	União de Tomar	0–2	Benfica	Tomar
16:00		Report	Faustino 58' (o.g.); Eusébio 86'	Stadium: Estádio Municipal de Tomar; Referee: Raúl Nazaré

19 November 1972 11	Benfica	3–0	Farense	Lisbon
19:00	Humberto Coelho 18'; Nené 24', 27'	Report		Stadium: Estádio da Luz; Referee: Sebastião Pássaro

26 November 1972 12	Vitória de Guimarães	1–2	Benfica	Guimarães
18:00	Custódio Pinto 13'	Report	Vítor Martins 8', 36'	Stadium: Estádio D. Afonso Henriques; Referee: António Garrido

3 December 1972 13	CUF	0–1	Benfica	Barreiro
18:00		Report	Eusébio 90'	Stadium: Complexo Desportivo Alfredo da Silva; Referee: António Espanhol

10 December 1972 14	Benfica	2–0	Atlético	Lisbon
18:00	Eusébio 44'; Simões 52'	Report		Stadium: Estádio da Luz; Referee: Armando Castro

17 December 1972 15	Montijo	0–1	Benfica	Montijo
18:00		Report	Eusébio 50'	Stadium: Campo Luís de Almeida Fidalgo; Referee: Porém Luís

31 December 1972 16	Leixões	1–5	Benfica	Matosinhos
16:00	Esteves 8'	Report	Humberto Coelho 10'; Eusébio 22'; Nené 25'; Vítor Martins 80'; Vítor Baptista 84'	Stadium: Estádio do Mar; Referee: Porfírio da Silva

7 January 1973 17	Benfica	4–1	Boavista	Lisbon
18:00	Vítor Baptista 17', 71'; Nené 31'; Eusébio 41'	Report	Salvador 48'	Stadium: Estádio da Luz; Referee: Inácio de Almeida

14 January 1973 18	Beira-Mar	1–2	Benfica	Aveiro
16:00	Alemão 66'	Report	Simões 61'; Artur Jorge 87'	Stadium: Estádio Mário Duarte; Referee: Jaime Loureiro

21 January 1973 19	Benfica	6–1	União de Coimbra	Lisbon
18:00	Eusébio 1', 36'; Simões 2'; Vítor Baptista 20'; Humberto Coelho 70'; Nené 74'	Report	Reis 66'	Stadium: Estádio da Luz; Referee: Porém Luís

28 January 1972 20	Sporting	1–2	Benfica	Lisbon
18:00	Faria 38'	Report	Nené 26'; Artur Jorge 27'	Stadium: Estádio de Alvalade; Referee: César Correia

20 February 1973 21	Benfica	3–0	Barreirense	Lisbon
16:00	Humberto Coelho 24'; Artur Jorge 36', 45'	Report		Stadium: Estádio da Luz; Referee: Melo Acúrsio

25 February 1973 22	Belenenses	0–2	Benfica	Lisbon
18:00		Report	Eusébio 25'; Artur Jorge 89'	Stadium: Estádio do Restelo; Referee: Francisco Lobo

11 March 1973 23	Benfica	3–0	Vitória de Setúbal	Lisbon
18:00	Artur Jorge 27', 77'; Eusébio 75'	Report		Stadium: Estádio da Luz; Referee: César Correia

1 April 1973 24	Porto	2–2	Benfica	Porto
18:00	Heredia 26'; Flávio 86'	Report	Nené 15'; Eusébio 57'	Stadium: Estádio das Antas; Referee: António Garrido

15 April 1973 25	Benfica	2–1	União de Tomar	Lisbon
16:00	Eusébio 23', 78'	Report	Fernando Luiz 48'	Stadium: Estádio da Luz; Referee: Armando Paraty

22 April 1973 26	Farense	0–5	Benfica	Faro
16:00		Report	Humberto Coelho 3'; Eusébio 39', 55'; Vítor Martins 50'; Artur Jorge 87'	Stadium: Estádio de São Luís; Referee: António Garrido

13 May 1973 27	Benfica	8–0	Vitória de Guimarães	Lisbon
18:00	Humberto Coelho 9'; Toni 14'; Eusébio 15', 23', 34'; Nené 19'; Nelinho 70'; Osvaldinho 90' (o.g.)	Report		Stadium: Estádio da Luz; Referee: António Espanhol

20 May 1973 28	Benfica	2–0	CUF	Lisbon
18:00	Eusébio 12', 60'	Report		Stadium: Estádio da Luz; Referee: César Correia

3 June 1973 29	Atlético	0–0	Benfica	Lisbon
16:00		Report		Stadium: Estádio da Tapadinha; Referee: Francisco Lobo

10 June 1973 30	Benfica	6–0	Montijo	Lisbon
18:00	Eusébio 14', 22', 28', 70'; Toni 63'; Jordão 82'	Report		Stadium: Estádio da Luz; Referee: Fernando Leite

=== Taça de Portugal ===
18 March 1973 Fifth Rd	Belenenses	2–4	Benfica	Lisbon
15:00	Francisco Gonzalez 10'; Quinito 25'		Artur Jorge 1', 2'; Nené 19'; Toni 24'	Stadium: Estádio do Restelo; Referee: Ismael Baltasar

8 April 1973 Sixth Rd	Leixões	2–0	Benfica	Matosinhos
16:00	Esteves 8'; Porfírio 23'			Stadium: Estádio do Mar; Referee: César Correia

=== European Cup ===
==== First round ====
13 September 1972 First leg	Malmö FF (Sweden)	1–0	(Portugal) Benfica	Malmö
19;00	Larsson 11'	Report		Stadium: Malmö Stadion; Attendance: 30,000; Referee: Wolfgang Riedel

27 September 1972 Second leg	Benfica (Portugal)	4–1 (4–2 agg.)	(Sweden) Malmö FF	Lisbon
21:45	Jordão 24'; Simões 29'; Eusébio 43' (pen.), 60'	Report	Tapper 89' (pen.)	Stadium: Estádio da Luz; Attendance: 50,000; Referee: Robert Héliès

==== Second round ====
25 October 1972 First leg	Derby County (England)	3–0	(Portugal) Benfica	Derby
19;00	McFarland 6'; Hector 8'; McGovern 40'	Report		Stadium: Baseball Ground; Attendance: 30,000; Referee: Bertil Lööw

8 November 1972 Second leg	Benfica (Portugal)	0–0 (0–3 agg.)	(England) Derby County	Lisbon
21:45		Report		Stadium: Estádio da Luz; Attendance: 60,000; Referee: Robert Schaut

=== Friendlies ===
16 July 1972	Benfica	2–2	Sporting	Foxborough, Massachusetts
	Eusébio 44' (pen.), 70'		Marinho 6'; Fernando Peres 80' (pen.)	Stadium: Schaefer Stadium; Attendance: 40,000; Referee: Angelo Bratsis

23 July 1972	Benfica	3–0	Sporting	Foxborough, Massachusetts
	Eusébio 70' (pen.); Rui Jordão 80'; Nené 88'			Stadium: Schaefer Stadium; Attendance: 14,000; Referee: Jim Powell

26 August 1972 Trofeo Ramón de Carranza	Benfica	3–0	Botafogo	Cádiz
	Rui Jordão 4'; Nené 27'; Wendell 87' (pen.)			Stadium: Estadio Ramón de Carranza

27 August 1972 Trofeo Ramón de Carranza	Athletic Bilbao	2–1 (a.e.t.)	Benfica	Cádiz
	Carlos 82', 97'		Nené 21'	Stadium: Estadio Ramón de Carranza

1 September 1972	Indonesia	2–4	Benfica	Jakarta
	Risdianto 65'; Waskito 84'		Nené 3', 13'; Artur Jorge 27'	Stadium: Gelora Bung Karno Sports Complex

3 September 1972	West Berlin XI	2–4	Benfica	Jakarta
	Risdianto 65'; Waskito 84'		Adolfo; Humberto Coelho; Vítor Baptista; Nené	Stadium: Gelora Bung Karno Sports Complex

17 October 1972	Offenbach–Eintracht Frankfurt XI	1–3	Benfica	Frankfurt
	Heese 5'		Humberto Coelho 28'; Eusébio 77'; Rui Jordão 85'	Stadium: Waldstadion; Attendance: 12,000

15 December 1972	Calcio Padova	1–7	Benfica	Padua
				Stadium: Stadio Silvio Appiani

20 December 1972 Taça de Honra	Belenenses	0–3	Benfica	Lisbon
22:15			Eusébio 20'; Nené 42'; Calado 89' (o.g.)	Stadium: Estádio do Restelo; Referee: Guedes Jorge

23 December 1972 Taça de Honra	Benfica	1–1 (4–2 p)	Atlético	Lisbon
22:15	Eusébio 31'		Clésio 70'	Stadium: Estádio do Restelo; Referee: César Reigadas
	Penalties
	Humberto Coelho (penalty scored); Simões (penalty scored); Rui Rodrigues (penalty scored); Eusébio (penalty scored); Matine (penalty missed)		(penalty scored) Clésio; (penalty scored) Zézinho; (penalty missed) Mesquita; (penalty missed) Baltasar

10 January 1973 Nicaragua earthquake	Atlético Madrid	0–0	Benfica	Madrid
				Stadium: Vicente Calderón Stadium; Attendance: 10,000

5 February 1973	Hong Kong	1–3	Benfica	Hong Kong
				Stadium: Hong Kong Stadium

8 February 1973	China	1–5	Benfica	Hong Kong
	Cheung Chi Wai 32' (pen.)		Artur Jorge 19'; Eusébio 48'	Stadium: Hong Kong Stadium

11 February 1973	Macau XI	0–11	Benfica	Macau
			Artur Jorge; Humberto Coelho; Nelinho; Eusébio

15 February 1973	Indonesia	1–4	Benfica	Jakarta
			Eusébio; Artur Jorge	Stadium: Gelora Bung Karno Sports Complex; Attendance: 80,000

16 May 1973	Marítimo	0–4	Benfica	Funchal
			Humberto Coelho; Nelinho; Eusébio	Stadium: Estádio Marcello Caetano

22 May 1973	Nürnberg–Bayern Munich XI	2–2	Benfica	Nuremberg
	Müller 20', 36'		Eusébio 2'; Matine 35'	Stadium: Stadion Nürnberg; Attendance: 15,000

27 May 1973	Seiko	1–6	Benfica	Hong Kong

30 May 1973	Caroline Hill	1–5	Benfica	Hong Kong
			Nené; Eusébio; Toni

5 June 1973	Stade de Reims	2–2	Benfica	Reims
			Nené; Rui Jordão	Stadium: Stade Auguste Delaune

11 June 1973 Salamanca TM	Salamanca	1–2	Benfica	Villares de la Reina
			Rui Jordão	Stadium: Helmántico Stadium; Referee: Tejerina

12 June 1973 Salamanca TM	Benfica	2–1	Anderlecht	Villares de la Reina
	Eusébio 44', 53'		Goal	Stadium: Helmántico Stadium; Referee: Guruceta

20 June 1973 Troféu Vinho do Porto	Benfica	3–0	Nottingham Forest	Lisbon
	Nelinho; Eusébio; Jordão			Stadium: Estádio da Luz; Referee: Américo Barradas

24 June 1973 Troféu Vinho do Porto	Boavista	1–4	Benfica	Porto
	Salvador Almeida		Eusébio 89'; Jordão; Vítor Martins	Stadium: Estádio do Bessa

27 June 1973 Trofeo Ibérico	Benfica	7–1	Málaga	Badajoz
	Eusébio 2', 13'; Adolfo 18'; Nené 20'; Toni 61'; Jordão 63'		Perrone 45'	Stadium: Estadio Municipal Vivero

29 June 1973 Trofeo Ibérico	Benfica	5–2	Red Star Belgrade	Badajoz
	Eusébio 12', 26' (pen.), 49'; Jordão 18'; Nené		Karasi; Jorik	Stadium: Estadio Municipal Vivero

== Player statistics ==
The squad for the season consisted of the players listed in the tables below, as well as staff member Jimmy Hagan (manager), Fernando Cabrita (assistant manager), Fernando Neves (Director of Football).

Note 1: Note: Flags indicate national team as defined under FIFA eligibility rules. Players may hold more than one non-FIFA nationality.

Note 2: Players with squad numbers marked ‡ joined the club during the 1972-73 season via transfer, with more details in the following section.

No.	Pos	Nat	Player	Total		Primeira Divisão		Taça de Portugal		European Cup	
No.	Pos	Nat	Player	Apps	Goals	Apps	Goals	Apps	Goals	Apps	Goals
1	GK	(Portugal) POR	José Henrique	36	0	30	0	2	0	4	0
1^{‡}	GK	(Portugal) POR	Manuel Bento	1	0	1	0	0	0	0	0
2	DF	(Portugal) POR	Adolfo Calisto	35	2	29	2	2	0	4	0
3	DF	(Portugal) POR	Amândio Malta da Silva	30	0	25	0	1	0	4	0
3	DF	(Portugal) POR	Artur Correia	10	0	8	0	2	0	0	0
4	DF	(Portugal) POR	Humberto Coelho	31	8	27	8	0	0	4	0
4	DF	(Portugal) POR	Rui Rodrigues	18	0	16	0	1	0	1	0
4	DF	(Portugal) POR	Messias Timula	22	0	16	0	2	0	4	0
5	DF	(Portugal) POR	António Bastos Lopes	2	0	1	0	1	0	0	0
5	DF	(Portugal) POR	Jaime Graça	20	3	16	3	0	0	4	0
6	MF	(Portugal) POR	Toni	33	4	28	3	1	1	4	0
7	FW	(Portugal) POR	Nené	34	13	28	12	2	1	4	0
7^{‡}	FW	(Portugal) POR	Nelinho	4	1	4	1	0	0	0	0
8^{‡}	MF	(Portugal) POR	Augusto Matine	10	0	8	0	2	0	0	0
8	MF	(Portugal) POR	Vítor Martins	24	4	22	4	2	0	0	0
9	FW	(Portugal) POR	Vítor Baptista	16	6	14	6	0	0	2	0
9	FW	(Portugal) POR	Rui Jordão	14	6	10	5	1	0	3	1
9	FW	(Portugal) POR	Artur Jorge	18	13	15	11	1	2	2	0
10	FW	(Portugal) POR	Eusébio	33	42	28	40	1	0	4	2
11	MF	(Portugal) POR	Diamantino Costa	5	0	4	0	1	0	0	0
11	MF	(Portugal) POR	António Simões	35	6	29	5	2	0	4	1
11	MF	(Portugal) POR	Shéu	2	0	1	0	1	0	0	0

== Transfers ==
=== In ===
Entry date	Position	Player	From club	Fee	Ref
26 May 1972	GK	Manuel Bento	Barreirense	Undisclosed	
27 May 1972	MF	Nelinho	Beira-Mar	Undisclosed	
27 May 1972	FW	Vítor Móia	Cova da Piedade	Undisclosed	
5 July 1972	MF	Augusto Matine	Vitória de Setúbal	Loan return	

=== Out ===
Exit date	Position	Player	To club	Fee	Ref
6 June 1972	GK	Manuel Abrantes	Barreirense	Free	

=== Out by loan ===
Exit date	Position	Player	To club	Return date	Ref
7 July 1972	DF	António Barros	União de Coimbra	30 June 1973	
12 August 1972	MF	Eurico Caires	Beira-Mar	30 June 1973	
18 August 1972	GK	João Fonseca	Leixões	30 June 1973	
19 September 1972	MF	João Alves	Varzim	30 June 1973	
25 September 1972	DF	Zeca	Atlético	30 June 1973	

== See also ==
- List of unbeaten football club seasons
