= 1971–72 S.L. Benfica season =

Benfica
1971–72 season
- President: Borges Coutinho
- Head coach: Jimmy Hagan
- Stadium: Estádio da Luz
- Primeira Divisão: 1st
- Taça de Portugal: Winners
- European Cup: Semi-finals
- Top goalscorer: League: Artur Jorge (27); All: Artur Jorge (32)
Home colours

The 1971–72 season was Sport Lisboa e Benfica's 68th season in existence and the club's 38th consecutive season in the top flight of Portuguese football, covering the period from 1 July 1971 to 30 June 1972. Benfica competed domestically in the Primeira Divisão and the Taça de Portugal, and participated in the European Cup after winning the previous league.

After recovering the title in the past season, Hagan remained for second season. He strengthened his team by adding Vítor Baptista, Artur Correia and Rui Rodrigues. To off-set, José Torres departed the club, alongside others, such as Jorge Calado and Jacinto Santos. Benfica began their league campaign by beating Porto in Estádio das Antas, only to be stopped a week later by CUF. They responded with a string of consecutive wins that propelled them into first place on 31 October. They drew again in the following week, now with Boavista and were caught at the top. In the European Cup, Benfica eliminated Wacker in the first round and CSKA Sofia in the second. Domestically, in November, Benfica began a nine-match winning run that allowed them to open a comfortable lead at the top. They drew again in February but that did not stop their momentum, and their continued collecting consecutive wins, five more, until their experienced their first league defeat on 26 March, at the hands of Barreirense. In the European Cup, Benfica faced Feyenoord in the quarter-finals, beating them 5–2 on aggregate but were stopped in the semi-finals by Ajax. Afterwards, Benfica sealed their 19th league title and won their sixth double after beating Sporting in the Taça de Portugal final

== Season summary ==
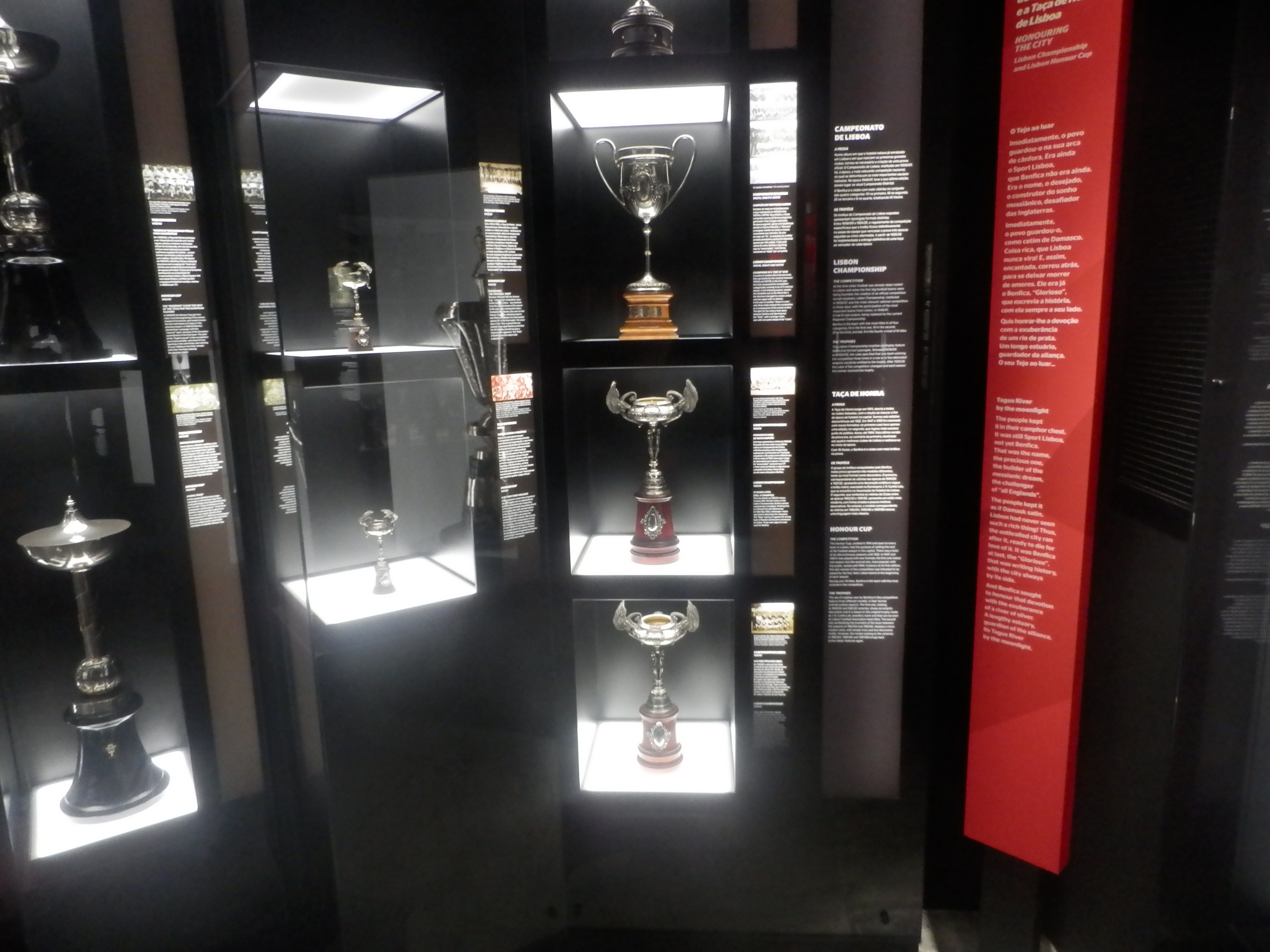
Benfica won another Taça de Honra (bottom) in this season.

Benfica started the new season as reigning Primeira Divisão holders after they recovered that honour in 1970–71. English manager Jimmy Hagan began his second season in charge, still with José Augusto as his assistant. In the transfer window, Benfica's major signings were Vítor Baptista for the offence and Artur Correia and Rui Rodrigues for the defence. Historic player José Torres departed the club for Vitória de Setúbal in the deal involving Vítor Baptista. Other departures included Jorge Calado and Jacinto Santos. The pre-season began on 20 July with medical tests, and the first preparation game was on 31 July with Arsenal. Afterwards, Benfica went on a tour for England, where they played Arsenal again, among other teams. In late August, Benfica had a second tour, now in Italy and competed in the Ramón de Carranza Trophy in Spain. They concluded the preparations by winning the Taça de Honra against Belenenses on 8 September.

The season began on 12 September with visit to Estádio das Antas to play Porto. Benfica won 3–1 with goals from Eusébio and Artur Jorge. Three days later, Benfica started their European Cup campaign with a 4–0 win against Wacker. On the 19, Benfica dropped their first points in the league after a surprising 1–1 draw with CUF. That left them in fourth place, one-point behind leaders Vitória de Setúbal and Sporting. On 26 September, Benfica defeated Vitória de Setúbal away and pass them on the league table, placing them in third, one-less than leader Sporting. The month closed with another victory in the European Cup, for a 7–1 aggregate win against Wacker. In October, Benfica won all of his league matches but only reached first place on the 31 after a home win against União de Tomar. In Europe, Benfica faced CSKA Sofia for the second round, beating them 2–1 on aggregate and qualifying for the quarter-finals. On 7 November, Benfica played Boavista on the road and drew 2–2 and were therefore caught in first place by Sporting. That situation was short lived as Benfica began a winning streak that lasted until February. Nine consecutive wins, including a 3–0 win in Estádio de Alvalade against Sporting, allowed Benfica to quickly build a comfortable lead. On match-day 12, the lead already stood at three-points, and Benfica lapped the first half of the Primeira Divisão with a five more points than second-place, Vitória de Setúbal. They began the second part of the season by beating Porto in the Clássico, but two-weeks later, they were finally stopped in the home draw to Vitória de Setúbal.

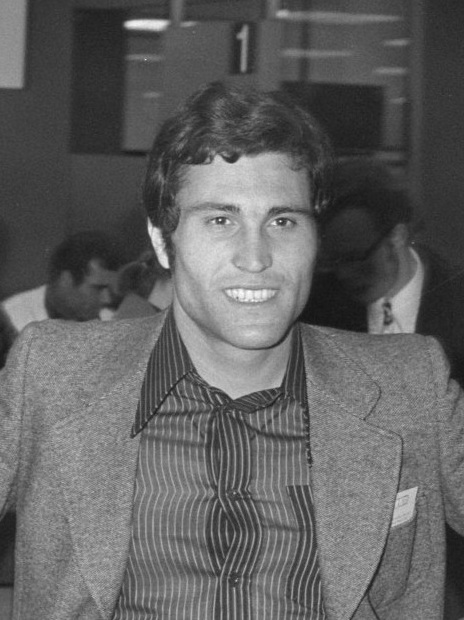
Vítor Baptista scored 15 goals in his debut season.

Benfica responded well and kept on winning, increasing their lead to eight-points by match-day 23 after five consecutive wins. In the European Cup, on 8 March, the team was defeated in first leg of the quarter-finals by Feyenoord. Benfica complained of referee Kunze as António Simões described: "I never thought I would find a referee like this. Dishonest is all I can say about him.". On 22 March, Benfica received Feyenoord and won 5–1. With the game in 2–1 on the 80th minute, which qualified Feyenoord; Benfica scored three goals in the last ten minutes to progress to the semi-finals. The win was seen as a revenge because Ernst Happel had repeatedly labelled Benfica as an inferior team. Four days later, Benfica lost for the first time in the Primeira Divisão. On match-day 24, Barreirense beat Benfica by 1–0 and prevented their goal of finishing the league undefeated. Afterwards, Eusébio said that the game against Feyenoord could not serve as an excuse. Benfica entered in April still in all competitions and their first match was the semi-finals of the European Cup. Facing another Dutch team, Ajax from Johan Cruyff, Benfica was defeated in Amsterdam by 1–0. In the home reception to Ajax, Benfica attempted to qualify for their sixth final, but drew 0–0 and were eliminated. Hagan's tactics were blamed by the press for the elimination, while Jaime Graça targeted the referee for annulling a clean goal for Benfica. The team finished the month by playing two matches for the Taça de Portugal. On 23 April, they defeated Cova da Piedade by 6–3 for the quarter-finals and on 30, they thrashed Porto by 6–0 in the semi-finals. They ensured their fourth consecutive final and were meeting Sporting in the Taça de Portugal final, repeating the same teams of the last three finals. The Primeira Divisão resumed on 7 May, with Benfica beating Académica de Coimbra by 3–1, thus confirming their 19th league title. With three matches still to go, Benfica tied the season 1960–61 for the club record of earliest match-day to win the league. They finished the campaign with 55 points in 60 possible and Artur Jorge was Bola de Prata for league top-scorer with 27 goals. The season ended on 4 June with the Taça de Portugal final where Benfica narrowly beat Sporting by 3–2. Benfica scored first by Eusébio on the 20th minute, but Sporting responded with two goals in the second half. Eusébio scored again to level the game on 2 goals on the 69th minute, requiring the need of extra-time, where on the 117th minute, he scored another to seal the win. It was Eusébio's first hat-trick in a Taça de Portugal final. Benfica had won another league and cup double, their six double.

== Competitions ==
Win Draw Loss Postponed

=== Overall record ===
Competition	First match	Last match	Record								
Competition	First match	Last match	G	W	D	L	GF	GA	GD	Win %	Source
Primeira Divisão	9 September 1972	28 May 1972	30	26	3	1	81	16	+65	86.67	
Taça de Portugal	5 March 1972	4 June 1972	5	5	0	0	21	6	+15	100.00	
European Cup	15 September 1971	19 April 1972	8	4	2	2	14	5	+9	50.00	
Total			43	35	5	3	116	27	+89	81.40	

=== Primeira Divisão ===
==== League table ====
Pos	Team	Pld	W	D	L	GF	GA	GD	Pts	Qualification or relegation
1	Benfica (C)	30	26	3	1	81	16	+65	55	Qualification to European Cup first round
2	Vitória de Setúbal	30	17	11	2	62	16	+46	45	Qualification to UEFA Cup first round
3	Sporting CP	30	17	9	4	51	26	+25	43	Qualification to Cup Winners' Cup first round (Note: Sporting qualified for the Cup Winners' Cup as runners-up of the 1972 Taça de Portugal Final, because Taça de Portugal winners, Benfica qualified for the European Cup.)
4	CUF Barreiro	30	12	13	5	43	28	+15	37	Qualification to UEFA Cup first round
5	Porto	30	13	7	10	51	32	+19	33	Qualification to UEFA Cup first round

Source: RSSSF and footballzz.co.uk
(C) Champions

==== Results by round ====
Round	1	2	3	4	5	6	7	8	9	10	11	12	13	14	15	16	17	18	19	20	21	22	23	24	25	26	27	28	29	30
Ground	A	H	A	H	A	H	H	A	H	A	H	A	H	A	H	H	A	H	A	H	A	A	H	A	H	A	H	A	H	A
Result	W	D	W	W	W	W	W	D	W	W	W	W	W	W	W	W	W	D	W	W	W	W	W	L	W	W	W	W	W	W
Position	4	5	3	2	2	2	1	1	1	1	1	1	1	1	1	1	1	1	1	1	1	1	1	1	1	1	1	1	1	1

Source: ForaDeJogo
A = Away; H = Home; W = Win; D = Draw; L = Loss

==== Matches ====
12 September 1971 1	Porto	1–3	Benfica	Porto
18:00	Abel 24'	Report	Eusébio 49', 52'; Artur Jorge 86'	Stadium: Estádio das Antas; Referee: Francisco Lobo

19 September 1971 2	Benfica	1–1	CUF	Lisbon
18:00	Artur Jorge 62'	Report	Eduardo 34'	Stadium: Estádio da Luz; Referee: Porfírio Silva

26 September 1971 3	Vitória de Setúbal	1–3	Benfica	Setúbal
18:00	José Maria 67'	Report	Vítor Baptista 29'; Adolfo 33'; Carlos Cardoso 41' (o.g.)	Stadium: Estádio do Bonfim; Referee: Mário Alves

3 October 1971 4	Benfica	2–1	Beira-Mar	Lisbon
18:00	Artur Jorge 16', 67'	Report	Alemão 30'	Stadium: Estádio da Luz; Referee: Manuel Fortunato

17 October 1971 5	Tirsense	0–3	Benfica	Santo Tirso
18:00		Report	Artur Jorge 65' (pen.), 79', 84'	Stadium: Estádio Abel Alves de Figueiredo; Referee: Ismael Baltasar

24 October 1971 6	Benfica	1–0	Belenenses	Lisbon
18:00	Simões 5'	Report		Stadium: Estádio da Luz; Referee: Fernando Leite

31 October 1971 7	Benfica	3–0	União de Tomar	Lisbon
16:00	Malta da Silva 12'; Simões 46', 72'	Report		Stadium: Estádio da Luz; Referee: Carlos Monteiro

7 November 1971 8	Boavista	2–2	Benfica	Porto
18:00	Fraguito 35'; Celso 53'	Report	Eusébio 20', 42'	Stadium: Estádio do Lima; Referee: Joaquim Freire

28 November 1971 9	Benfica	5–1	Barreirense	Lisbon
16:00	Vítor Baptista 8', 18', 32', 46'; Jaime Graça 82'	Report	José João 50'	Stadium: Estádio da Luz; Referee: Fernando Leite

5 December 1971 10	Atlético	1–5	Benfica	Lisbon
16:00	João Leitão 26'	Report	Artur Jorge; 24', 83', 86' Nené 10', 48'	Stadium: Estádio da Tapadinha; Referee: João Calado

12 December 1971 11	Benfica	6–0	Leixões	Lisbon
16:00	Artur Jorge 2', 5'; Eusébio 4'; Vítor Baptista 22', 37'; Nené 29'	Report		Stadium: Estádio da Luz; Referee: Mário Alves

19 December 1971 12	Académica de Coimbra	0–3	Benfica	Coimbra
17:00		Report	Artur Jorge 62', 70'; Eusébio 77'	Stadium: Estádio Municipal de Coimbra; Referee: Ismael Baltasar

23 December 1971 13	Benfica	3–0	Vitória de Guimarães	Lisbon
18:00	Eusébio 2', 51'; Jordão 65'	Report		Stadium: Estádio da Luz; Referee: Sebastião Pássaro

2 January 1972 14	Sporting	0–3	Benfica	Lisbon
18:00		Report	Eusébio 51'; Rui Rodrigues 57'; Nené 84'	Stadium: Estádio de Alvalade; Referee: Francisco Lobo

5 January 1972 15	Benfica	2–0	Farense	Lisbon
16:00	Artur Jorge 1'; Vítor Baptista 3'	Report		Stadium: Estádio da Luz; Referee: António Garrido

23 January 1972 16	Benfica	1–0	Porto	Lisbon
19:00	Simões 60'	Report		Stadium: Estádio da Luz; Referee: Porfírio Silva

30 January 1972 17	CUF	0–2	Benfica	Barreiro
18:00		Report	Jordão 36', 52'	Stadium: Complexo Desportivo Alfredo da Silva; Referee: César Correia

6 February 1972 18	Benfica	0–0	Vitória de Setúbal	Lisbon
16:00		Report		Stadium: Estádio da Luz; Referee: Fernando Leite

13 February 1972 19	Beira-Mar	1–3	Benfica	Aveiro
16:00	Eduardo 53'	Report	Artur Jorge 38'; Nené 39'; Jordão 48'	Stadium: Estádio Mário Duarte; Referee: Ernesto Borrego

20 February 1972 20	Benfica	7–0	Tirsense	Lisbon
18:00	Eusébio 9', 69'; Artur Jorge 31', 50', 59', 78', 88'	Report		Stadium: Estádio da Luz; Referee: António Espanhol

27 February 1972 21	Belenenses	0–1	Benfica	Lisbon
18:00		Report	Artur Jorge 11'	Stadium: Estádio do Restelo; Referee: António Garrido

12 March 1972 22	União de Tomar	0–1	Benfica	Tomar
16:00		Report	Simões 1'	Stadium: Estádio Municipal de Tomar; Referee: Ismael Baltasar

18 March 1972 23	Benfica	2–0	Boavista	Lisbon
18:00	Artur Jorge 28', 83'	Report		Stadium: Estádio da Luz; Referee: Manuel Fortunato

26 March 1972 24	Barreirense	1–0	Benfica	Barreiro
18:00	Serafim de Oliveira 37'	Report		Stadium: Campo D. Manuel de Melo; Referee: Mário Alves

9 April 1972 25	Benfica	5–1	Atlético	Lisbon
18:00	Vítor Baptista 1'; Nené 3'; Artur Jorge 11', 25'; Eusébio 87'	Report	Pedras 48'	Stadium: Estádio da Luz; Referee: Joaquim Campos

16 April 1972 26	Leixões	0–1	Benfica	Matosinhos
16:00		Report	Jordão 71'	Stadium: Estádio do Mar; Referee: Ismael Baltasar

7 May 1972 27	Benfica	3–1	Académica de Coimbra	Lisbon
16:00	Vítor Baptista 23'; Artur Jorge 41', 44'	Report	Vasco Gervásio 76' (pen.)	Stadium: Estádio da Luz; Referee: Manuel Fortunato

14 May 1972 28	Vitória de Guimarães	1–3	Benfica	Guimarães
18:00	Vítor Martins 67' (o.g.)	Report	Eusébio 1'; Jordão 31', 85'	Stadium: Estádio D. Afonso Henriques; Referee: Armando Paraty

21 May 1972 29	Benfica	2–1	Sporting	Lisbon
18:00	Eusébio 1', 29'	Report	Yazalde 56'	Stadium: Estádio da Luz; Referee: Maximiano Afonso

28 May 1972 30	Farense	2–5	Benfica	Faro
16:00	Sério 48'; Farias 52'	Report	Diamantino Costa 5'; Artur Correia 13'; Eusébio 17', 19', 60'	Stadium: Estádio de São Luís; Attendance: 15,000; Referee: Ismael Baltasar

=== Taça de Portugal ===
5 March 1972 Round of 32	Benfica	1–0	União de Coimbra	Lisbon
	Jordão 20'			Stadium: Estádio da Luz; Referee: Carlos Monteiro

12 April 1972 Round of 16	Benfica	5–1	Marinhense	Lisbon
	Vítor Baptista 55', 83'; Eusébio 58', 62', 89'		Naftal 59'	Stadium: Estádio da Luz; Referee: Carlos Monteiro

23 April 1972 Quarter-final	Cova da Piedade	3–6	Benfica	Cova da Piedade
	Arlindo 1'; Vítor Móia 9', 71'		Nené 2'; Vítor Baptista 29'; Jordão 60', 65'; Eusébio 68', 90'	Stadium: Campo Silva Nunes; Referee: António Espanhol

30 April 1972 Semi-final	Benfica	6–0	Porto	Lisbon
	Vítor Baptista 23', 72'; Artur Jorge 46'; Nené 49', 57'; Valdemar Barros 70' (o.g.)			Stadium: Estádio da Luz; Referee: António Garrido

4 June 1972 Final	Benfica	3–2 (a.e.t.)	Sporting	Oeiras
	Eusébio 19', 70', 118'		Peres 51' (pen.); Dinis 61'	Stadium: Estádio Nacional; Referee: Francisco Lobo

=== European Cup ===
==== First round ====
15 September 1971 First leg	Wacker (Austria)	0–4	(Portugal) Benfica	Innsbruck
19:30		Report	Jaime Graça 19'; Artur Jorge 24', 83'; Eusébio 82'	Stadium: Tivoli; Referee: Liuben Radunchev

29 September 1971 Second leg	Benfica (Portugal)	3–1 (7–1 agg.)	(Austria) Wacker	Lisbon
21:45	Calisto 35'; Artur Jorge 73'; Simões 89'	Report	Jara 48'	Stadium: Estádio da Luz; Referee: Malcolm Wright

==== Second round ====
20 October 1971 First leg	Benfica (Portugal)	2–1	(Bulgaria) CSKA Sofia	Lisbon
21:45	Rui Rodrigues 50'; Artur Jorge 62'	Report	Zhekov 85'	Stadium: Estádio da Luz; Referee: Aurelio Angonese

3 November 1971 Second leg	CSKA Sofia (Bulgaria)	0–0 (1–2 agg.)	(Portugal) Benfica	Sofia
18:30		Report		Stadium: Vasil Levski National Stadium; Referee: Leonidas Vamvakopoulos

==== Quarter-finals ====
8 March 1972 First leg	Feyenoord (Netherlands)	1–0	(Portugal) Benfica	Rotterdam
20:30	Laseroms 50'	Report		Stadium: De Kuip; Referee: Gerhard Kunze

22 March 1972 Second leg	Benfica (Portugal)	5–1 (5–2 agg.)	(Netherlands) Feyenoord	Lisbon
21:45	Nené 6', 81', 92'; Rui Jordão 30', 90'	Report	Van Hanegem 75'	Stadium: Estádio da Luz; Referee: Clive Thomas

==== Semi-finals ====
5 April 1972 First leg	Ajax (Netherlands)	1–0	(Portugal) Benfica	Amsterdam
20:15	Swart 64'	Report		Stadium: Olympic Stadium; Referee: Karlo Kruashvili

19 April 1972 Second leg	Benfica (Portugal)	0–0 (0–1 agg.)	(Netherlands) Ajax	Lisbon
21:45		Report		Stadium: Estádio da Luz; Referee: Norman Burtenshaw

=== Friendlies ===
31 July 1971	Benfica	2–0	Arsenal	Lisbon
21:45	Vítor Baptista 34'; Eusébio			Stadium: Estádio da Luz

4 August 1971	Arsenal	6–2	Benfica	London
19:30	Roberts 15'; Radford 32'; Armstrong 44'; Graham 77', 90'; Peter Storey 80' (pen.)		Artur Jorge 48'; Diamantino Costa 70'	Stadium: Arsenal Stadium; Attendance: 44,244; Referee: Norman Burtenshaw

7 August 1971	Newcastle United	1–0	Benfica	Newcastle upon Tyne
	Tommy Gibb 17'			Stadium: St James' Park; Referee: Charles Howell

10 August 1971	Middlesbrough	1–1	Benfica	Middlesbrough
	John Hickton 5'		Eusébio 28'	Stadium: Ayresome Park; Attendance: 20,000

21 August 1971	Cagliari	1–4	Benfica	Cagliari
	Sergio Gori 6'		Vítor Baptista 33'; Eusébio 35', 70'; Artur Jorge 66'	Stadium: Stadio Sant'Elia; Attendance: 55,000; Referee: Gianfranco Menegali

23 August 1971	Genoa	1–2	Benfica	Genoa
	Sidio Corradi 63'		Artur Jorge 50'; Eusébio 83'	Stadium: Stadio Luigi Ferraris; Attendance: 30,000; Referee: Giovanni Picasso

25 August 1971	Atalanta	2–4	Benfica	Bergamo
21:45	Pinolla 4'; Sergio Magistrelli 30'		Vítor Baptista 1', 31'; Eusébio 32'; Artur Jorge 43'	Stadium: Stadio Atleti Azzurri d'Italia; Attendance: 30,000; Referee: Cesari Gussoni

28 August 1971 Trofeo Ramón de Carranza	Benfica	1–1 (4–2 p)	Atlético Madrid	Cádiz
	Eusébio 46'		Gárate 49' (pen.)	Stadium: Estadio Ramón de Carranza; Referee: Carmanatti
	Penalties
	Humberto Coelho (penalty scored); Artur Jorge (penalty scored); Jaime Graça (penalty scored); Eusébio (penalty scored)		(penalty scored) José Ufarte; (penalty scored) Adelardo

29 August 1971 Trofeo Ramón de Carranza	Benfica	3–0	Peñarol	Cádiz
	Eusébio 29', 47', 77'			Stadium: Estadio Ramón de Carranza; Referee: Gaspar Pintado

5 September 1971 Taça de Honra	Benfica	2–1	Sporting	Lisbon
22:15	Rui Jordão 22'; Humberto Coelho 73'		João Lourenço 33'	Stadium: Estádio do Restelo

8 September 1971 Taça de Honra	Belenenses	1–4	Benfica	Lisbon
22:15	Laurindo 70'		Nené 18'; Rui Rodrigues 30'; Carlos Pereira 53'; Rui Jordão 60'	Stadium: Estádio do Restelo

23 September 1971	Red Star Belgrade	2–3	Benfica	Belgrade
21:45	Šekularac 20'; Filipovic 43'		Eusébio 51', 60'; Nené 54'	Stadium: Red Star Stadium; Attendance: 85,000

9 January 1972	Portuguesa de Desportos	1–3	Benfica	São Paulo
	Marinho (pen.)		Vítor Baptista; Rui Jordão; Simões (pen.)	Stadium: Estádio do Canindé

13 January 1972	Coritiba	2–0	Benfica	Curitiba
	Paquito; Cláudio			Stadium: Estádio Couto Pereira

15 January 1972 Rio de Janeiro TM	Flamengo	1–0	Benfica	Rio de Janeiro
	Fio Maravilha 78'			Stadium: Maracanã Stadium; Attendance: 44,280

18 January 1972 Rio de Janeiro TM	Vasco da Gama	0–2	Benfica	Rio de Janeiro
			Rui Jordão 25'; Simões 70'	Stadium: Maracanã Stadium; Attendance: 22,097

29 February 1972	Fulham	3–2	Benfica	London
	Steve Earle; Roger Cross 20'; Humberto Coelho (o.g.)		Diamantino 45'; Eusébio	Stadium: Craven Cottage; Attendance: 15,646

2 April 1972 Taça M. Caetano	Benfica	2–1	Bayern Munich	Paris
	Adolfo 2'; Vítor Baptista 14'		Roth 40'	Stadium: Stade Olympique Yves-du-Manoir

== Player statistics ==
The squad for the season consisted of the players listed in the tables below, as well as staff member Jimmy Hagan (manager), José Augusto (assistant manager), Fernando Neves (Director of Football).

Note 1: Note: Flags indicate national team as defined under FIFA eligibility rules. Players may hold more than one non-FIFA nationality.

Note 2: Players with squad numbers marked ‡ joined the club during the 1971-72 season via transfer, with more details in the following section.

No.	Pos	Nat	Player	Total		Primeira Divisão		Taça de Portugal		European Cup	
No.	Pos	Nat	Player	Apps	Goals	Apps	Goals	Apps	Goals	Apps	Goals
1	GK	(Portugal) POR	José Henrique	41	0	30	0	3	0	8	0
1	GK	(Portugal) POR	João Fonseca	4	0	1	0	3	0	0	0
2	DF	(Portugal) POR	Adolfo Calisto	35	2	22	1	5	0	8	1
3	DF	(Portugal) POR	Amândio Malta da Silva	26	1	21	1	0	0	5	0
3^{‡}	DF	(Portugal) POR	Artur Correia	37	1	27	1	4	0	6	0
4	DF	(Portugal) POR	Humberto Coelho	38	0	25	0	5	0	8	0
4^{‡}	DF	(Portugal) POR	Rui Rodrigues	25	2	21	1	0	0	4	1
4	DF	(Portugal) POR	Messias Timula	26	0	17	0	5	0	4	0
5	DF	(Portugal) POR	Zeca	9	0	7	0	0	0	2	0
5	DF	(Portugal) POR	Jaime Graça	38	2	26	1	4	0	8	1
6	MF	(Portugal) POR	Toni	30	0	22	0	5	0	3	0
7	FW	(Portugal) POR	Nené	37	13	26	7	4	3	7	3
8	MF	(Portugal) POR	Eurico Caires	2	0	1	0	1	0	0	0
8	MF	(Portugal) POR	Vítor Martins	12	0	8	0	4	0	0	0
9^{‡}	FW	(Portugal) POR	Vítor Baptista	24	15	17	10	3	5	4	0
9	FW	(Portugal) POR	Rui Jordão	30	12	18	7	4	3	8	2
9	FW	(Portugal) POR	Artur Jorge	36	32	26	27	2	1	8	4
10	FW	(Portugal) POR	Eusébio	37	27	24	18	5	8	8	1
11	MF	(Portugal) POR	Diamantino Costa	11	1	7	1	2	0	2	0
11	MF	(Portugal) POR	António Simões	28	6	23	5	0	0	5	1

(Note: Almanaque do Benfica credits three goals to Artur Jorge in the 6–0 win against Leixões, while 100 anos 100 troféus and História de 50 anos do Desporto Português credits two to Vítor Baptista. Since most sources give 27 goals to Artur Jorge at the end the league, Artur Jorge is listed with 27 goals, instead of 28.)

== Transfers ==
=== In ===
Entry date	Position	Player	From club	Fee	Ref
16 July 1971	FW	Vítor Baptista	Vitória de Setúbal	Undisclosed	
16 July 1971	DF	Artur Correia	Académica	Undisclosed	
19 July 1971	DF	Rui Rodrigues	Académica	Undisclosed	
30 July 1971	GK	José Henrique	Toronto Metros	Loan return	
10 August 1971	GK	Manuel Abrantes	Académica	Undisclosed	

=== Out ===
Exit date	Position	Player	To club	Fee	Ref
16 July 1971	FW	José Torres	Vitória de Setúbal	Undisclosed	
16 July 1971	FW	Praia	Vitória de Setúbal	Undisclosed	
24 July 1971	MF	Jorge Calado	União de Tomar	Undisclosed	
21 August 1971	DF	Fernando Severino	Beira-Mar	Free	
27 August 1971	FW	Raul Águas	Académica	Undisclosed	
24 September 1971	DF	Jacinto Santos	Leixões	Free	
6 June 1971	DF	Marques	Beira-Mar	Free	

=== Out by loan ===
Exit date	Position	Player	To club	Return date	Ref
1 September 1971	MF	Augusto Matine	Vitória de Setúbal	30 June 1972	
