= 1973–74 S.L. Benfica season =

Benfica
1973–74 season
- President: Borges Coutinho
- Head coach: Jimmy Hagan (until 26 September 1973); Fernando Cabrita
- Stadium: Estádio da Luz
- Primeira Divisão: 2nd
- Taça de Portugal: Runners–up
- European Cup: Second round
- Top goalscorer: League: Eusébio (16); All: Eusébio (19)
Home colours

The 1973–74 season was Sport Lisboa e Benfica's 70th season in existence and the club's 40th consecutive season in the top flight of Portuguese football, covering the period from 1 July 1973 to 30 June 1974. Benfica competed domestically in the Primeira Divisão and the Taça de Portugal, and participated in the European Cup after winning the previous league.

After dominating the league the year before, Jimmy Hagan started his fourth season at Benfica. With only Mário Moinhos and António Barros as new additions, Benfica started their campaign on 9 September, losing in the opening day to Boavista. Two weeks later, Hagan unexpectedly resigned from his position because of interference of President Borges Coutinho to his job. Assistant Fernando Cabrita replaced him and within a month, Benfica was knocked-out of the European Cup by Újpesti Dózsa. Despite that, Benfica's performance in the Primeira Divisão remained good, with the team getting a point from the top on early December. However a poor end of the month saw them lost the undefeated streak at home dating back to 1965, and fall to fourth place, four points from the top. In the second half of the season, Benfica collected consecutive wins and reached second place by early February, while also cutting their gap to Sporting to just one point. In March, a loss in Estádio das Antas with Porto and a draw with Beira-Mar, put Sporting with a four-point lead again. Nonetheless, Benfica beat Sporting at their own home and three weeks later, they got back to a single point difference after their rival dropped points. That gap remained unchanged until the last match-day, when Sporting won the title. In the Portuguese Cup, Benfica reached the Taça de Portugal final after beating Porto away, but lost the competition on extra-time to Sporting.

== Season summary ==
Benfica started the new season after having won their third consecutive league title in the past season. It was their first league undefeated, and they also broke a record for longest distance to second place, 18 points. In the transfer window, Benfica signed Mário Moinhos and brought back António Barros from loan. In the departures, they let go of Augusto Matine and João Alves. In his fourth year, Hagan's pre-season saw Benfica play in Angola and Mozambique, three games with América with three different results. Afterwards, they played the Trofeo Colombino in 18 and 19 August, losing the trophy for Dinamo Tbilisi. From 21 to 23 August, Benfica participated in the inaugural Trofeo Villa de Madrid, finishing fourth. The pre-season closed with the Thessaloniki Tournament, which Benfica won.

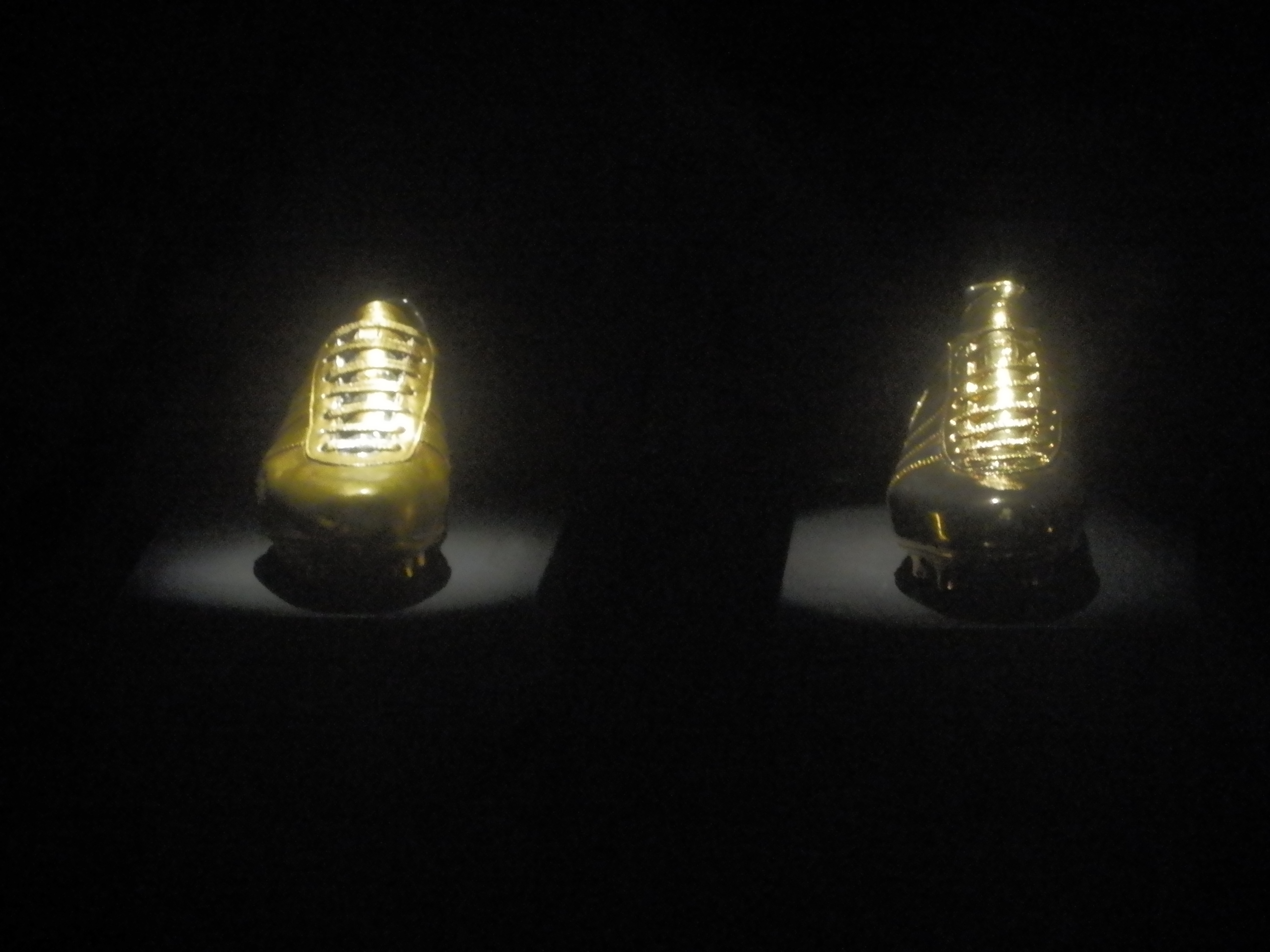
Eusébio collected his second European Golden Shoe on 30 October 1973.

Benfica started their title defence on 9 September against Boavista on Estádio do Bessa. They lost 2–0, ending their undefeated streak in the competition that dated back to 26 March 1972. The team responded well and won their next three league matches. On 25 September, on a day of Eusébio testimonial match, in a training session, Humberto Coelho, Toni and Nelinho did an exercise wrong and Jimmy Hagan lost it. He fined them, made them repeat an afternoon practise and miss the game. Hagan back-tracked on the first two, but still did not call them for the game saying that "Toni and Humberto will not play". President Borges Coutinho overruled him and Hagan unexpectedly resigned the next day for interference to his job. He was replaced by Fernando Cabrita, his assistant. His first game was an away win against Olympiacos for the European Cup. On 7 October, Benfica drew 0–0 with Farense, adding another lost point in the campaign. In the league table, they sat in third place with 7 points, two shy of leaders Vitória de Setúbal. But as Benfica resumed their winning path domestically, in the European Cup, the situation deteriorated, with Benfica being knocked-out by Újpesti Dózsa in the second round. Now solely focused in the Primeira Divisão, on match-day 9, Benfica dropped points on the road again, drawing 0–0 with Vitória de Guimarães. That allowed Vitória de Setúbal to increase their lead even further. On 2 December, Benfica defeated Sporting in the Lisbon derby to overtake them in the league. They also took advantage of the loss of Setúbal to reduce their lead to a point. However, the following week, on the first away match of December, Benfica lost 2–0 against Académica de Coimbra and was again three points down from leaders Setúbal. The month closed with a home defeat against Vitória de Setúbal, their first home loss since 17 October 1965. Losing by 3–2 in Estádio da Luz pushed Benfica into fourth place with 21 points, four less than Sporting, who lapped the first half of the season in first place.

Benfica's first games in 1974 was much better overall. After winning all their matches in January, Benfica reached second-place ex-aequo with Porto on 11 February. Taking advantage of Porto's draw and Sporting's loss, Benfica won their match and cut Sporting's lead to just one point. In early March, Benfica surpassed Porto after their rival dropped points in Guimarães. On 10 March, Benfica visited Estádio das Antas to play Porto, losing 2–1. With this defeat, Benfica was now with 35 points, three less than Sporting. Following a home win against Guimarães, on next match on the road, Benfica drew with Beira-Mar by 1–1. The draw allowed Sporting to open a four-point gap with five matches to go, practically ending any hope of Benfica renewing their league title. On 31 March, Benfica played Sporting in Estádio de Alvalade and defeated them by 5–3, cutting their rivals lead to two points. Before the match, Sporting had requested a Spanish referee and issued an announcement asking for doping control on Benfica. Fernando Cabrita replied that Benfica's players did not need to be drugged to be the best in Portugal, as they had shown in the match and with eight points in play, Benfica was not dead yet. On 21 April, Sporting dropped points with Beira-Mar, and witnessed Benfica get within a point with three matches to go. Four days later, Carnation Revolution occurred, bringing the country back to democracy. In May, in the last three matches with both teams separated by a point, Sporting won the title on 20 May after defeating Barreirense, while Benfica drew with Setúbal. Benfica finished with two points less, 47 to 49. On 2 June, Benfica secured their presence in the Taça de Portugal final after a 3–0 win against Porto on Estádio das Antas. Seven days later, Benfica met Sporting in the final. A goal from Nené gave Benfica the lead which lasted until the 88th minute, when Sporting levelled. In extra-time, Marinho scored for Sporting which awarded them a double. It was Fernando Cabrita last match in charge, as he already knew he was being replaced with Milorad Pavić.

== Competitions ==
Win Draw Loss Postponed

=== Overall record ===
Competition	First match	Last match	Record								
Competition	First match	Last match	G	W	D	L	GF	GA	GD	Win %	Source
Primeira Divisão	9 September 1973	20 May 1974	30	21	5	4	68	23	+45	70.00	
Taça de Portugal	7 April 1974	9 June 1974	5	4	0	1	18	2	+16	80.00	
European Cup	19 September 1973	7 November 1973	4	2	1	1	3	3	+0	50.00	
Total			39	27	6	6	89	28	+61	69.23	

=== Primeira Divisão ===
==== League table ====
Pos	Team	Pld	W	D	L	GF	GA	GD	Pts	Qualification or relegation
1	Sporting CP (C)	30	23	3	4	96	21	+75	49	Qualification to European Cup first round
2	Benfica	30	21	5	4	68	23	+45	47	Qualification to Cup Winners' Cup first round (Note: Benfica qualified for the Cup Winners' Cup as runners-up of the 1974 Taça de Portugal Final, because Taça de Portugal winners, Sporting qualified for the European Cup.)
3	Vitória de Setúbal	30	19	7	4	69	21	+48	45	Qualification to UEFA Cup first round
4	Porto	30	18	7	5	43	22	+21	43	Qualification to UEFA Cup first round
5	Belenenses	30	17	6	7	56	34	+22	40	Qualification to UEFA Cup first round

Source: RSSSF and footballzz.co.uk
(C) Champions

==== Results by round ====
Round	1	2	3	4	5	6	7	8	9	10	11	12	13	14	15	16	17	18	19	20	21	22	23	24	25	26	27	28	29	30
Ground	A	H	A	H	A	H	A	H	A	H	H	A	H	A	H	H	A	H	A	H	A	H	A	H	A	A	H	A	H	A
Result	L	W	W	W	D	W	W	W	D	W	W	L	W	D	L	W	W	W	W	W	W	W	L	W	D	W	W	W	W	D
Position	16	6	6	4	4	3	3	3	3	3	2	3	3	3	4	4	4	4	3	3	3	2	3	2	2	2	2	2	2	2

Source: ForaDeJogo
A = Away; H = Home; W = Win; D = Draw; L = Loss

==== Matches ====
9 September 1973 1	Boavista	2–0	Benfica	Porto
18:00	Salvador 50', 88'	Report		Stadium: Estádio do Bessa; Referee: António Garrido

16 September 1973 2	Benfica	3–0	Leixões	Lisbon
16:00	Jordão 4', 39'; Eusébio 40'	Report		Stadium: Estádio da Luz; Referee: Raúl Nazaré

23 September 1973 3	Belenenses	1–2	Benfica	Lisbon
18:00	Luís Carlos 60'	Report	Jordão 25'; Nené 78'	Stadium: Estádio do Restelo; Referee: Ismael Baltasar

30 September 1973 4	Benfica	2–0	Oriental	Lisbon
18:00	Artur Jorge 68'; Eusébio 84'	Report		Stadium: Estádio da Luz; Referee: Armando Castro

7 October 1973 5	Farense	0–0	Benfica	Faro
16:00		Report		Stadium: Estádio de São Luís; Referee: Manuel Fortunato

21 October 1973 6	Benfica	1–0	CUF	Lisbon
18:00	Jordão 60'	Report		Stadium: Estádio da Luz; Referee: Jaime Loureiro

28 October 1973 7	Montijo	0–1	Benfica	Montijo
18:00		Report	Vítor Baptista 88'	Stadium: Campo Luís de Almeida Fidalgo; Referee: Melo Acúrsio

4 November 1973 8	Benfica	2–1	Porto	Lisbon
19:00	Eusébio 3'; Nené 54'	Report	Abel 69'	Stadium: Estádio da Luz; Referee: César Correia

18 November 1973 9	Vitória de Guimarães	0–0	Benfica	Guimarães
18:00		Report		Stadium: Estádio D. Afonso Henriques; Referee: Armando Paraty

25 November 1973 10	Benfica	2–0	Beira-Mar	Lisbon
18:00	Eusébio 76'; Jordão 80'	Report		Stadium: Estádio da Luz; Referee: Manuel Poeira

2 December 1973 11	Benfica	2–0	Sporting	Lisbon
18:00	Eusébio 54', 74'	Report		Stadium: Estádio da Luz; Referee: Fernando Leite

9 December 1973 12	Académica de Coimbra	2–0	Benfica	Coimbra
18:00	Vasco Gervásio 31'; Vítor Campos 75'	Report		Stadium: Estádio Municipal de Coimbra; Referee: Sebastião Pássaro

16 December 1973 13	Benfica	4–1	Olhanense	Lisbon
18:00	Simões 37'; Eusébio 41', 66'; Vítor Martins 50'	Report	Ademir 62'	Stadium: Estádio da Luz; Referee: Francisco Lobo

23 December 1973 14	Barreirense	0–0	Benfica	Barreiro
18:00		Report		Stadium: Campo D. Manuel de Melo; Referee: António Espanhol

30 December 1973 15	Benfica	2–3	Vitória de Setúbal	Lisbon
18:00	Jordão 87'; Vítor Martins 88' (pen.)	Report	Artur Correia 1' (o.g.); Octávio 55'; Jacinto João 65'	Stadium: Estádio da Luz; Referee: António Garrido

6 January 1974 16	Benfica	2–0	Boavista	Lisbon
18:00	Vítor Martins 52'; Nené 60'	Report		Stadium: Estádio da Luz; Referee: José Luís Tavares

13 January 1974 17	Leixões	0–1	Benfica	Matosinhos
18:00		Report	Jordão 52'	Stadium: Estádio do Mar; Referee: Ismael Baltasar

20 January 1974 18	Benfica	3–1	Belenenses	Lisbon
18:00	Jordão 36'; Eusébio 40', 78'	Report	Vítor Godinho 45'	Stadium: Estádio da Luz; Referee: Porém Luís

11 February 1974 19	Oriental	1–3	Benfica	Marvila
16:00	Fernando Madeira 58'	Report	Humberto Coelho 1'; Nelinho 21'; Moinhos 80'	Stadium: Campo Engenheiro Carlos Salema; Referee: Sebastião Pássaro

17 February 1974 20	Benfica	1–0	Farense	Lisbon
19:00	Eusébio 3'	Report		Stadium: Estádio da Luz; Referee: Raúl Nazaré

24 February 1974 21	CUF	0–2	Benfica	Barreiro
18:00		Report	Eusébio 82', 87'	Stadium: Complexo Desportivo Alfredo da Silva; Referee: António Garrido

3 March 1974 22	Benfica	5–1	Montijo	Lisbon
18:00	Humberto Coelho 34', 36'; Eusébio 44'; Toni 49'; Jordão 87' (pen.)	Report	Jorge Patrício 53'	Stadium: Estádio da Luz; Referee: António Espanhol

10 March 1974 23	Porto	2–1	Benfica	Porto
16:00	Abel 12'; Cubillas 55'	Report	Eusébio 33'	Stadium: Estádio das Antas; Referee: Francisco Lobo

16 March 1974 24	Benfica	5–1	Vitória de Guimarães	Lisbon
19:00	Nené 2'; Artur Correia 5'; Simões 20'; Vítor Baptista 23', 40'	Report	Campos Pinto 36'	Stadium: Estádio da Luz; Referee: Manuel Poeira

24 March 1974 25	Beira-Mar	1–1	Benfica	Aveiro
16:00	Alemão 40'	Report	Vítor Baptista 7'	Stadium: Estádio Mário Duarte; Referee: Ernesto Borrego

31 March 1974 26	Sporting	3–5	Benfica	Lisbon
18:00	Yazalde 8', 42' (pen.); Dé 89' (pen.)	Report	Humberto Coelho 12'; Nené 31', 35'; Jordão 58'; Vítor Martins 70'	Stadium: Estádio de Alvalade; Referee: Raúl Nazaré

21 April 1974 27	Benfica	5–0	Académica de Coimbra	Lisbon
16:00	Nené 6', 23'; Vítor Baptista 50'; Toni 68'; José Pedro 86'	Report		Stadium: Estádio da Luz; Referee: César Correia

5 May 1974 28	Olhanense	1–7	Benfica	Olhão
18:00	Ademir 77' (pen.)	Report	Jordão 2', 17', 57' (pen.), 70'; Vítor Baptista 38', 66'; Humberto Coelho 49'	Stadium: Estádio José Arcanjo; Referee: António Garrido

12 May 1974 29	Benfica	4–0	Barreirense	Lisbon
16:00	Eusébio 11'; Vítor Martins 29'; Vítor Baptista 71'; Jordão 77'	Report		Stadium: Estádio da Luz; Referee: Armando Paraty

20 May 1974 30	Vitória de Setúbal	2–2	Benfica	Setúbal
18:00	Jacinto João 44'; José Torres 50'	Report	Vítor Martins 10'; Vítor Baptista 22'	Stadium: Estádio do Bonfim; Referee: Porém Luís

=== Taça de Portugal ===
7 April 1974 Fifth Rd	Vianense	0–2	Benfica	Viana do Castelo
15:00		Report	Nené 13', 26'	Stadium: Estádio Dr. José de Matos; Referee: Bastos Silva

28 April 1974 Sixth Rd	Benfica	8–0	Oriental	Lisbon
15:00	Nené 12', 64'; Vítor Baptista 14'; Jordão 29'; Vítor Martins 31'; Adolfo 75'; Toni 82'; Humberto Coelho 85' (pen.)	Report		Stadium: Estádio da Luz; Referee: João Gomes

26 May 1974 Quarter-final	Farense	0–4	Benfica	Faro
15:00		Report	Vítor Baptista 42'; Humberto Coelho 48' (pen.); Eusébio 63'; Jordão 65'	Stadium: Estádio de São Luís; Referee: José Luís Tavares

2 June 1974 Semi-final	Porto	0–3	Benfica	Porto
15:00		Report	Nené 19', 59'; Eusébio 66'	Stadium: Estádio das Antas; Referee: António Espanhol

9 June 1974 Final	Benfica	1–2 (a.e.t.)	Sporting	Oeiras
17:00	Nené 32'	Report	Faria 89'; Marinho 107'	Stadium: Estádio Nacional; Referee: César Correia

=== European Cup ===
==== First round ====
19 September 1973 First leg	Benfica (Portugal)	1–0	(Greece) Olympiacos	Lisbon
21:45	Messias 53'	Report		Stadium: Estádio da Luz; Attendance: 60,000; Referee: Theodorus Boosten

3 October 1973 Second Leg	Olympiacos (Greece)	0–1 (0–2 agg.)	(Portugal) Benfica	Piraeus
20:30		Report	29' Nené	Stadium: Karaiskakis Stadium; Attendance: 30,000; Referee: Paul Schiller

==== Second round ====
24 October 1973 First leg	Benfica (Portugal)	1–1	(Hungary) Újpesti Dózsa	Lisbon
21:45	Eusébio 69'	Report	Tóth 57'	Stadium: Estádio da Luz; Attendance: 60,000; Referee: Gerhard Schulenburg

7 November 1973 Second Leg	Újpesti Dózsa (Hungary)	2–0 (3–1 agg.)	(Portugal) Benfica	Budapest
20:30	Bene 67'; Kolár 70'	Report		Stadium: Ferenc Szusza Stadion; Attendance: 30,000; Referee: Paolo Toselli

=== Friendlies ===
5 August 1973 TAP Trophy	Benfica	2–0	América	Lourenço Marques

8 August 1973 TAP Trophy	Benfica	0–1	América	Luanda

12 August 1973	Benfica	3–3	América	Sá da Bandeira

18 August 1973 Trofeo Colombino	Benfica	2–1	Derby County	Huelva
	Vítor Baptista 19', 64'		McGovern 82'	Stadium: Estadio Colombino

19 August 1973 Trofeo Colombino	Dinamo Tbilisi	3–1	Benfica	Huelva
	Kipiani 5'; Gutsaev 21', 89'		Vítor Baptista 40'	Stadium: Estadio Colombino

21 August 1973 Trofeo Villa de Madrid	A.C. Milan	1–0	Benfica	Madrid
	Rivera 50'			Stadium: Vicente Calderón Stadium

23 August 1973 Trofeo Villa de Madrid	Atlético Madrid	2–1	Benfica	Madrid
	Gárate 74', 85'		Nené 51'	Stadium: Vicente Calderón Stadium

28 August 1973	Club Brugge	2–3	Benfica	Bruges
				Stadium: Klokke Stadion

31 August 1973 Thessaloniki TM	Olympiacos	1–3	Benfica	Thessaloniki
				Stadium: Kleanthis Vikelidis Stadium

2 September 1973 Thessaloniki TM	Aris	0–2	Benfica	Thessaloniki
				Stadium: Kleanthis Vikelidis Stadium

4 September 1973	Olympiacos	1–1	Benfica	Athens
			Simões (pen.)

25 September 1973 Eusébio Tstml	Benfica	2–2	Rest of the World XI	Lisbon
				Stadium: Estádio da Luz; Attendance: 30,000

18 December 1973 Taça de Honra	Benfica	3–1	Oriental	Lisbon
	Moinhos 13'; Toni 18'; Rui Jordão 42'		Goal	Stadium: Estádio da Luz

26 December 1973 Taça de Honra	Benfica	3–2	Belenenses	Lisbon
	Moinhos 19'; Rui Jordão 64'; Toni 88'		40'; Joaquim Ramalho 91'	Stadium: Estádio de Alvalade

1 January 1974 Taça de Honra	Benfica	1–0	Sporting	Lisbon
	Humberto Coelho 73'			Stadium: Estádio do Restelo

5 February 1974	Marítimo	0–3	Benfica	Funchal
			Nelinho; José Pedro	Stadium: Estádio dos Barreiros

9 February 1974	Benfica	5–3	Portuguesa de Desportos	Funchal
	Humberto Coelho; José Pedro; Simões			Stadium: Estádio dos Barreiros

16 June 1974	Benfica	6–1	Beira XI	Mozambique
	Nené; Diamantino; Moinhos; Rui Jordão		Cond

== Player statistics ==
The squad for the season consisted of the players listed in the tables below, as well as staff member Jimmy Hagan (manager), Fernando Cabrita (assistant manager and later as manager).

Note 1: Note: Flags indicate national team as defined under FIFA eligibility rules. Players may hold more than one non-FIFA nationality.

Note 2: Players with squad numbers marked ‡ joined the club during the 1973-74 season via transfer, with more details in the following section.

No.	Pos	Nat	Player	Total		Primeira Divisão		Taça de Portugal		European Cup	
No.	Pos	Nat	Player	Apps	Goals	Apps	Goals	Apps	Goals	Apps	Goals
1	GK	(Portugal) POR	José Henrique	26	0	22	0	0	0	4	0
1	GK	(Portugal) POR	Manuel Bento	15	0	10	0	5	0	0	0
2	DF	(Portugal) POR	Adolfo Calisto	28	1	20	0	4	1	4	0
3	DF	(Portugal) POR	Amândio Malta da Silva	26	0	21	0	1	0	4	0
3	DF	(Portugal) POR	Artur Correia	32	1	25	1	5	0	2	0
4	DF	(Portugal) POR	Humberto Coelho	39	7	30	5	5	2	4	0
4	DF	(Portugal) POR	Rui Rodrigues	16	0	10	0	5	0	1	0
4	DF	(Portugal) POR	Messias Timula	13	1	9	0	0	0	4	1
4^{‡}	DF	(Portugal) POR	António Barros	15	0	12	0	3	0	0	0
5	DF	(Portugal) POR	António Bastos Lopes	3	0	3	0	0	0	0	0
5	DF	(Portugal) POR	Jaime Graça	4	0	2	0	2	0	0	0
6	MF	(Portugal) POR	Toni	33	3	24	2	5	1	4	0
7	FW	(Portugal) POR	Nené	34	16	26	8	4	7	4	1
7	FW	(Portugal) POR	Nelinho	8	1	8	1	0	0	0	0
8	MF	(Portugal) POR	José Pedro	3	1	2	1	1	0	0	0
8	MF	(Portugal) POR	Vítor Martins	32	7	25	6	5	1	2	0
8	MF	(Portugal) POR	Bernardino Pedroto	1	0	1	0	0	0	0	0
9	FW	(Portugal) POR	Vítor Baptista	28	11	21	9	5	2	2	0
9	FW	(Portugal) POR	Rui Jordão	35	17	26	15	5	2	4	0
9^{‡}	FW	(Portugal) POR	Mário Moinhos	6	1	5	1	0	0	1	0
9	FW	(Portugal) POR	Artur Jorge	4	1	4	1	0	0	0	0
10	FW	(Portugal) POR	Eusébio	28	19	21	16	3	2	4	1
11	MF	(Portugal) POR	Diamantino Costa	18	0	17	0	0	0	1	0
11	MF	(Portugal) POR	António Simões	36	2	27	2	5	0	4	0
11	MF	(Portugal) POR	Shéu	1	0	0	0	1	0	0	0

== Transfers ==
=== In ===
Entry date	Position	Player	From club	Fee	Ref
1 July 1973	FW	Mário Moinhos	Boavista	Undisclosed	
30 June 1973	DF	António Barros	União de Coimbra	Loan return	
1 July 1973	GK	Álvaro Reis	Sesimbra	Undisclosed	

=== Out ===
Exit date	Position	Player	To club	Fee	Ref
21 May 1973	MF	Augusto Matine	Vitória de Setúbal	Undisclosed	
1 July 1973	MF	João Alves	Montijo	Undisclosed	

=== Out by loan ===
Exit date	Position	Player	To club	Return date	Ref
1 August 1973	GK	António Fidalgo	Leixões	30 June 1974	
1 August 1973	FW	Vítor Móia	Oriental de Lisboa	30 June 1974	
1 August 1973	MF	Eurico Caires	Montijo	30 June 1974	
2 September 1973	GK	João Fonseca	Ourense	30 June 1974	
10 September 1973	DF	Zeca	Oriental de Lisboa	30 June 1974	
