= 1969 Taça de Portugal final =

- Event: 1968–69 Taça de Portugal
Académica	Benfica
1	2
- After extra time
- Date: 22 June 1969
- Venue: Estádio Nacional, Oeiras
- Referee: Ismael Baltazar (Setúbal)

The 1969 Taça de Portugal final was the final match of the 1968–69 Taça de Portugal, the 29th season of the Taça de Portugal, the premier Portuguese football cup competition organized by the Portuguese Football Federation (FPF). The match was played on 22 June 1969 at the Estádio Nacional in Oeiras, and opposed two Primeira Liga sides: Académica and Benfica. Benfica defeated Académica 2–1 to claim a thirteenth Taça de Portugal.

== Match ==
=== Details ===
22 June 1969

Académica	1–2 (a.e.t.)	Benfica
António 81'		Simões 85'; Eusébio 109'

Estádio Nacional, Oeiras
Referee: Ismael Baltazar (Setúbal)

Académica	Benfica

GK	1	(Portugal) Armelim Viegas
DF	(Portugal) António Marques (c)
DF	(Portugal) Vieira Nunes
DF	(Portugal) Rui Rodrigues
DF	(Portugal) José Belo
MF	(Portugal) Vítor Campos
MF	(Portugal) Fernando Peres	(substituted off) 68'
MF	(Portugal) Vasco Gervásio
MF	(Portugal) Mário Campos
FW	(Portugal) Manuel António
FW	(Spain) Nene
Substitutes:
FW	(Portugal) Augusto Rocha	(substituted on) 60'
FW	(Portugal) Serafim Pereira	(substituted on) 38'
Manager:
(Portugal) Francisco Andrade

GK	1	(Portugal) José Henrique
DF	(Portugal) Zeca
DF	(Portugal) Malta da Silva
DF	(Portugal) Adolfo Calisto
DF	(Portugal) Humberto Coelho
MF	(Portugal) Mário Coluna (c)
MF	(Portugal) António Simões
MF	(Portugal) Toni	(substituted off) 71'
MF	(Portugal) Jaime Graça
FW	(Portugal) Eusébio
FW	(Portugal) Abel Miglietti	(substituted off) 46'
Substitutes:
FW	(Portugal) José Augusto	(substituted on) 71'
FW	(Portugal) José Torres	(substituted on) 46'
Manager:
(Brazil) Otto Glória

1968–69 Taça de Portugal Winners
Benfica
13th Title

Match officials

- Assistant referees:
- Fourth official:

Match rules

- 90 minutes.
- 30 minutes of extra time if necessary.
