= 1967 Taça de Portugal final =

- Event: 1966–67 Taça de Portugal
Académica	Vitória de Setúbal
2	3
- Date: 9 July 1967
- Venue: Estádio Nacional, Oeiras
- Referee: Heliodoro Garcia (Lisbon)

The 1967 Taça de Portugal final was the final match of the 1966–67 Taça de Portugal, the 27th season of the Taça de Portugal, the premier Portuguese football cup competition organized by the Portuguese Football Federation (FPF). The match was played on 9 July 1967 at the Estádio Nacional in Oeiras, and opposed two Primeira Liga sides: Académica and Vitória de Setúbal. Vitória de Setúbal defeated Académica 3–2 in a cup final which went to extra-time, which would claim the Sadinos their second Taça de Portugal.

== Match ==
=== Details ===
9 July 1967

Académica	2–3 (a.e.t.)	Vitória de Setúbal
Celestino 5'; Ernesto 117'		José Maria 43'; Guerreiro 97'; João 144'

Estádio Nacional, Oeiras
Referee: Heliodoro Garcia (Lisbon)

Académica	Vitória de Setúbal

GK	1	(Portugal) João Maló
DF		(Portugal) Rui Rodrigues
DF		(Portugal) Vieira Nunes
DF	2	(Portugal) Celestino Bárbara
DF		(Portugal) António Marques
MF		(Portugal) Vítor Campos
MF		(Portugal) Toni
FW		(Portugal) Artur Jorge
FW	10	(Portugal) Augusto Rocha (c)
FW		(Portugal) Serafim Pereira
FW		(Portugal) Ernesto Sousa
Substitutes:
Manager:
(Portugal) Mário Wilson

GK	1	(Portugal) Dinis Vital
DF		(Portugal) Joaquim Conceição
DF		(Portugal) Herculano
MF		(Portugal) Manuel Leiria
MF		(Portugal) Carriço
MF		(Portugal) Pedras
MF		(Portugal) Fernando Tomé
FW		(Portugal) Vítor Baptista
FW		(Portugal) Jacinto João
FW		(Portugal) José Maria (c)
FW		(Portugal) Félix Guerreiro
Substitutes:
Manager:
(Portugal) Fernando Vaz

1966–67 Taça de Portugal Winners
Vitória de Setúbal
2nd Title

Match officials

- Assistant referees:
- Fourth official:

Match rules

- 90 minutes.
- 30 minutes of extra time if necessary.
