= Rui Rodrigues =

Portuguese footballer and manager (1943–2024)

Personal information
- Full name: Rui de Gouveia Pinto Rodrigues
- Date of birth: 17 May 1943
- Place of birth: Lourenço Marques, Portuguese Mozambique
- Date of death: 23 February 2024 (aged 80)
- Position: Centre-back

Senior career*
Years	Team	Apps	(Gls)
1962–1971	Académica	210	(17)
1971–1974	Benfica	47	(1)
1974–1976	Vitória Guimarães	48	(2)
1976–1979	Académica	33	(1)
Total		338	(21)

International career
1967–1976	Portugal	12	(3)

Managerial career
- 1979–1980: Leça
- 1980–1981: Beira-Mar
- 1981–1982: União Coimbra
- 1982: Beira-Mar
- 1983: Oliveira Bairro
- 1985: 1º de Maio
- 1995–1997: Benfica (youth)
- 2000: Camacha
- * Club domestic league appearances and goals

Rui de Gouveia Pinto Rodrigues (17 May 1943 – 23 February 2024) was a Portuguese football player and manager. He played as a centre-back.

Over the course of 17 seasons, Rodrigues amassed Portuguese top division totals of 338 games and 21 goals, representing Académica de Coimbra (two spells), S.L. Benfica and Vitória de Guimarães.

Rodrigues died on 23 February 2024, at the age of 80.

== Club career ==
Born in Lourenço Marques, Portuguese Mozambique, Rodrigues started at Grupo Desportivo 1º de Maio, after an unsuccessful try-out at Ferroviário de Lourenço Marques. In 1962, he travelled to Portugal for a training session with the under-18 national team. Only a few months later, at the start of 1962–63 season, he joined Académica de Coimbra. First with José Maria Pedroto and then with Mário Wilson, Rodrigues spent nine seasons in Coimbra, helping them reach a fourth place in 1964–65 and a club record second place in 1964–67, plus reaching two Portuguese Cup finals, in 1967 and 1969.

In 1971, after years of refusing offers from larger clubs, he accepted a move to Benfica. He made his debut on 12 September 1971, in a home win to Porto and played a total of 25 matches throughout the season, winning a league and cup double, and reached the semi-final of the European Cup. During his spell at Benfica, he suffered minor injuries that hindered his progress in the team and with competition from Messias and others, the 31-year old chose to leave Benfica in 1974.

Rodrigues then joined Vitória de Guimarães for two seasons, playing all of the league games in 1974–75 and receiving the captain armband in the following year, which ended with another Portuguese Cup final lost. Rodrigues returned to Académica in 1976, playing only 33 league appearances over three years, five of those in 1978–79 and with the team suffering relegation, the 36-year-old retired from football. In the following four years, he managed several teams, notably Leça and Beira-Mar (twice), returning to Benfica in 1995 on invitation of Artur Jorge to coach the under-12, winning the Campeonato Nacional de Infantis.

== International career ==
Rodrigues gained 12 caps for Portugal, nine as an Académica player. He made his debut on 26 November 1967 against Bulgaria, in a 1–0 loss in Sofia for the UEFA Euro 1968 qualifiers.

Rodrigues' last appearance was on 16 October 1976 against Poland, in a 2–0 home defeat for the 1978 FIFA World Cup qualification campaign.

== Career statistics ==
Scores and results list Portugal's goal tally first, score column indicates score after each Rodrigues goal.

List of international goals scored by Rui Rodrigues
No.	Date	Venue	Opponent	Score	Result	Competition
1	12 May 1971	Estádio das Antas, Porto, Portugal	Denmark	1–0	5–0	Euro 1972 qualifying
2	13 October 1971	Hampden Park, Glasgow, Scotland	Scotland	1–1	1–2	Euro 1972 qualifying
3	19 November 1975	Estádio José Alvalade (1956), Lisbon, Portugal	England	1–0	1–1	Euro 1976 qualifying

== Honours ==
Académica

- Taça de Portugal runner-up: 1966–67, 1968–69

Benfica

- Primeira Liga: 1971–72, 1972–73
- Taça de Portugal: 1971–72

Vitória de Guimarães

- Taça de Portugal runner-up: 1975–76
