= 1972 Taça de Portugal final =

- Event: 1971–72 Taça de Portugal
Benfica	Sporting CP
3	2
- After extra time
- Date: 4 June 1972
- Venue: Estádio Nacional, Oeiras
- Referee: Francisco Lobo (Setúbal)

The 1972 Taça de Portugal final was the final match of the 1971–72 Taça de Portugal, the 32nd season of the Taça de Portugal, the premier Portuguese football cup competition organized by the Portuguese Football Federation (FPF). The match was played on 4 June 1972 at the Estádio Nacional in Oeiras, and opposed two Primeira Liga sides: Benfica and Sporting CP. Benfica defeated Sporting CP 3–2 to claim a fifteenth Taça de Portugal.

== Match ==
=== Details ===
4 June 1972

Benfica	3–2 (a.e.t.)	Sporting CP
Eusébio 19', 70', 118'		Peres 51' (pen.); Dinis 61'

Estádio Nacional, Oeiras
Referee: Francisco Lobo (Setúbal)

Benfica	Sporting CP

GK	1	(Portugal) José Henrique
RB	2	(Portugal) Artur Correia
CB	3	(Portugal) Humberto Coelho
CB	4	(Portugal) Messias Timula
LB	5	(Portugal) Adolfo Calisto
CM	6	(Portugal) Jaime Graça (c)
CM	9	(Portugal) Vítor Martins
CM	8	(Portugal) Toni
RF	7	(Portugal) Nené	(substituted off) 73'
ST	10	(Portugal) Eusébio
LW	11	(Portugal) Diamantino Costa
Substitutes:
RF	16	(Portugal) Rui Jordão	(substituted on) 73'
Manager:
(England) Jimmy Hagan

GK	1	(Portugal) Vítor Damas
RB	2	(Portugal) Pedro Gomes (c)
CB		(Portugal) João Laranjeira
CB		(Portugal) José Carlos
LB	3	(Portugal) Hilário
MF	10	(Portugal) Fernando Peres
MF		(Portugal) Fernando Tomé	(substituted off) 104'
MF	4	(Portugal) Vítor Gonçalves
FW		(Portugal) Chico Faria	(substituted off) 46'
ST	9	(Argentina) Héctor Yazalde
LW	11	(Portugal) Joaquim Dinis
Substitutes:
MF		(Portugal) Marinho	(substituted on) 46'
FW		(Portugal) Nélson Fernandes	(substituted on) 104'
Manager:
(Portugal) Mário Lino

1971–72 Taça de Portugal Winners
Benfica
15th Title

Match officials

- Assistant referees:
- Fourth official:

Match rules

- 90 minutes.
- 30 minutes of extra time if necessary.

== See also ==
- Derby de Lisboa
- 1971–72 S.L. Benfica season
