= Messias Timula =

Portuguese footballer

Messias
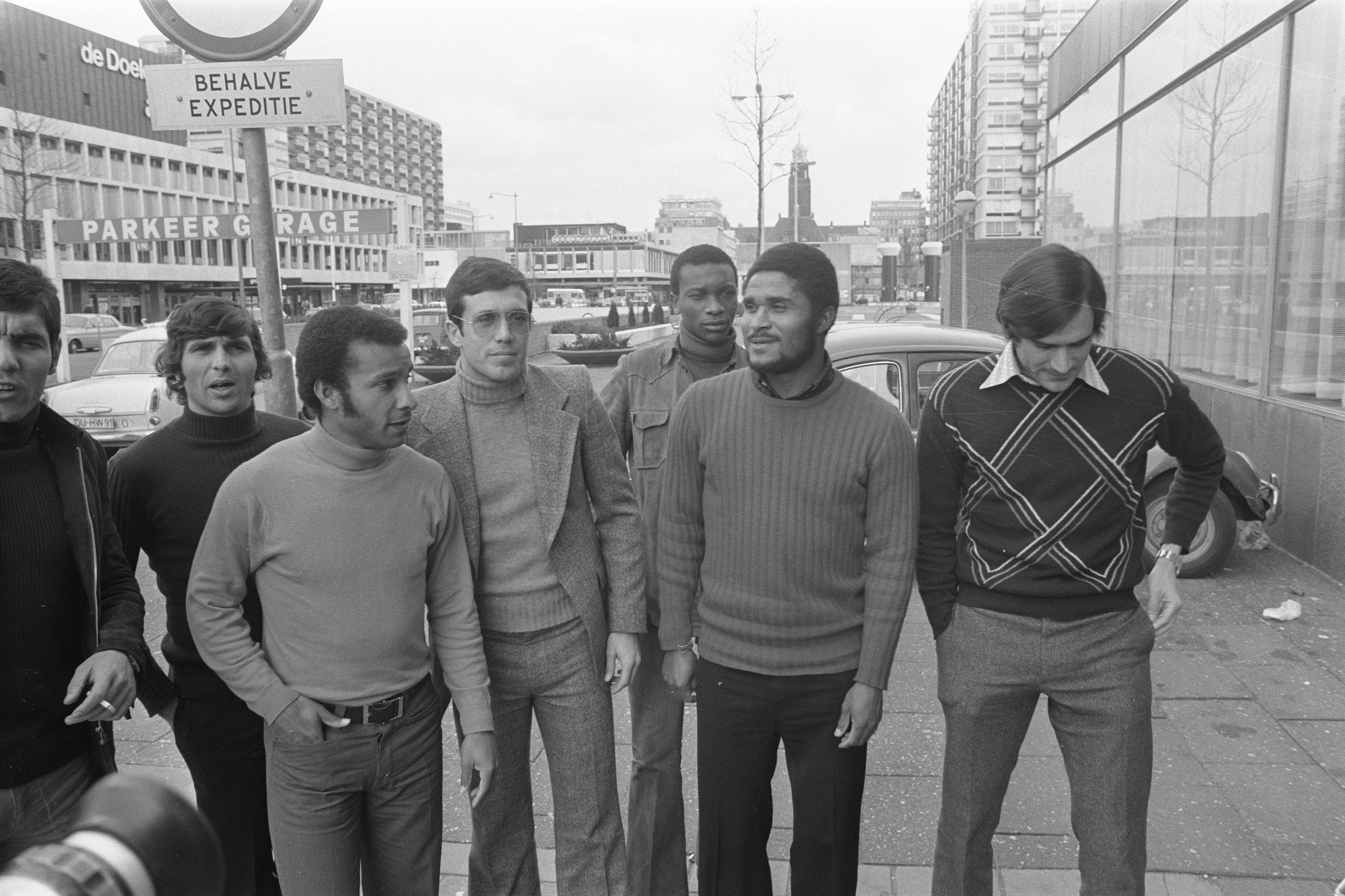
- Messias (third from right) in 1972

Personal information
- Full name: Messias Júlio Timula
- Date of birth: 18 December 1948
- Place of birth: Maputo, Mozambique
- Date of death: 18 February 1998 (aged 49)
- Height: 1.82 m (6 ft 0 in)
- Position: Centre-back

Senior career*
Years	Team	Apps	(Gls)
1967–1977	Benfica	89	(1)
1977	Rochester Lancers	15	(0)
1977–1978	Riopele	4	(0)
Total		108	(1)

International career
1972	Portugal	6	(0)
- * Club domestic league appearances and goals

Messias Júlio Timula (18 December 1948 – 18 February 1998), known simply as Messias, was a Portuguese footballer who played as a central defender.

== Club career ==
Born in Maputo, Portuguese Mozambique, Messias arrived at S.L. Benfica in 1967 as a 19-year old. Facing competition from Raúl Machado, Zeca and Humberto Coelho, he spent his first two seasons in the reserve team.

On 21 November 1969, Messias made his first appearance for the main squad, replacing Coelho in the 53rd minute of a 1–0 away loss to Vitória de Setúbal. He would play two more games in the same season – a European Cup match against Celtic on 26 November and a league one with U.F.C.I. Tomar on 1 December.

After remaining a backup player in 1970–71, Messias had his breakthrough the following campaign, playing 26 matches in all competitions and winning the Primeira Liga title, the Portuguese Cup and reaching the semi-finals of the European Cup. Due to strong competition from Amândio Malta da Silva and Rui Rodrigues, his playing time in 1972–73 and 1973–74 dropped; after his competition either left or lost influence, he regained a pivotal role alongside Coelho and won three more league titles, the first two as starter.

In 1977, after 123 overall appearances, Messias left Benfica and followed many teammates to the North American Soccer League. He took part in 15 games during his spell, reaching the Conference Championship final. He then returned to Portugal, playing for G.D. Riopele in their debut season in the top flight and retiring immediately after.

== International career ==
Messias received his first call up to the Portugal national team when they were selected to appear in the Brazil Independence Cup in 1972. After solid performances at club level, he made his debut on 18 June of that year against Chile, playing all of the remaining games in the tournament including the lost final to Brazil, which would be his last cap.

== Honours ==
Benfica

- Primeira Liga: 1970–71, 1971–72, 1972–73, 1974–75, 1975–76, 1976–77
- Taça de Portugal: 1971–72
