= Artur Correia =

Portuguese footballer

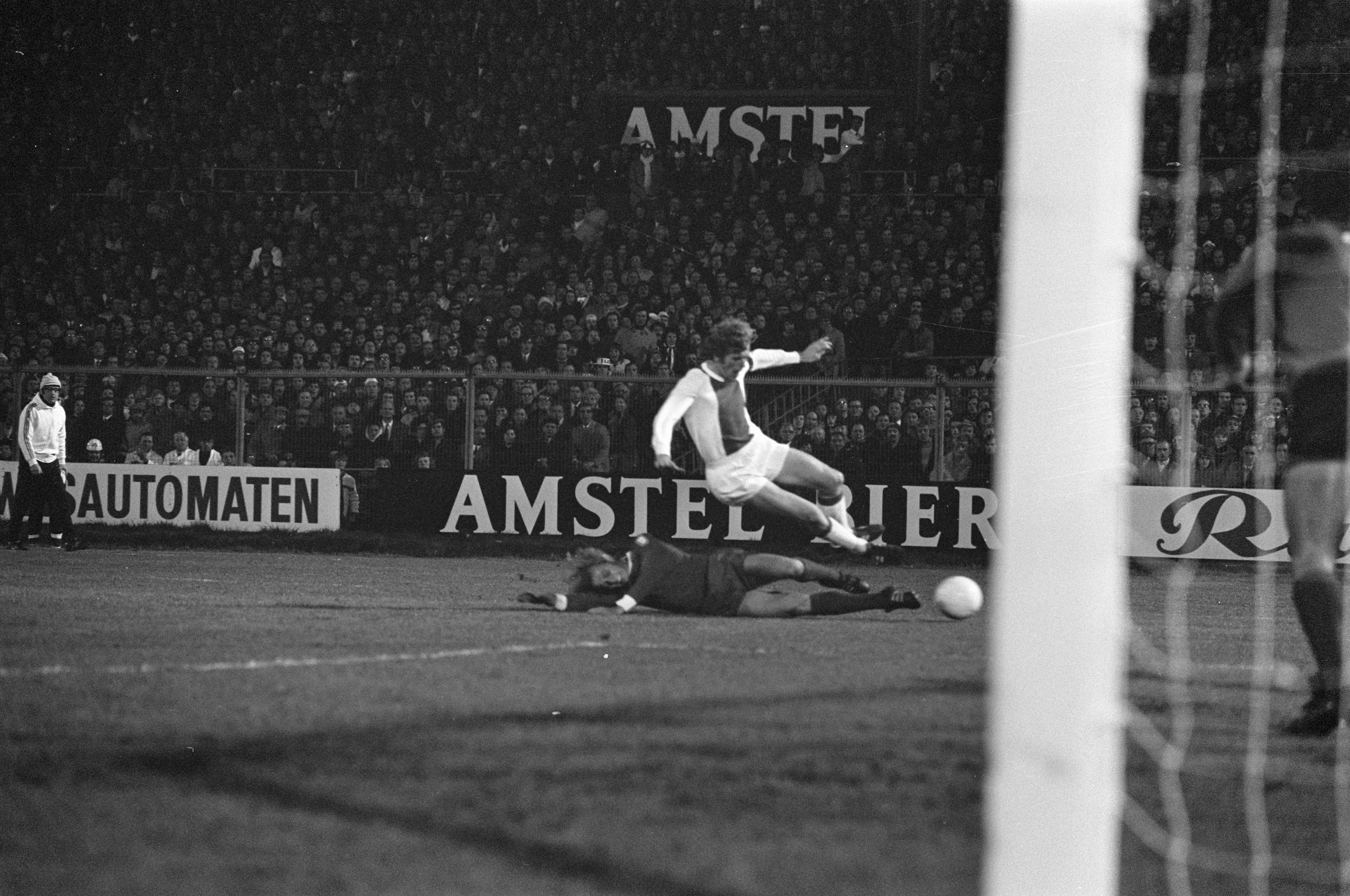
- Correia playing for Benfica against Ajax (1972)

Personal information
- Full name: Artur Manuel Soares Correia
- Date of birth: 18 April 1950
- Place of birth: Lisbon, Portugal
- Date of death: 25 July 2016 (aged 66)
- Place of death: Lisbon, Portugal
- Height: 1.70 m (5 ft 7 in)
- Position: Right back

Youth career
- 1965: Futebol Benfica
- 1965–1968: Benfica

Senior career*
Years	Team	Apps	(Gls)
1968–1971	Académica	47	(2)
1971–1977	Benfica	123	(3)
1977–1979	Sporting CP	49	(0)
1979	New England Tea Men	23	(0)
1979–1980	Sporting CP	14	(0)
1980	New England Tea Men	30	(0)

International career
1970–1971	Portugal U21	4	(0)
1972–1979	Portugal	34	(1)
- * Club domestic league appearances and goals

Artur Manuel Soares Correia (18 April 1950 – 25 July 2016) was a Portuguese footballer who played as a right back.

Nicknamed "Ruço", he amassed Primeira Liga totals of 234 games and four goals during 12 seasons, representing Académica, Benfica and Sporting, winning eight major titles with the second club including five national championships. He also spent two years in the United States, with the New England Tea Men.

Correia was a Portugal international for seven years, making his debut in 1972.

== Club career ==
Born in Lisbon, Correia grew up in the Santa Cruz neighbourhood of Benfica with four siblings, two brothers and two sisters. He first started at C.F. Benfica, before joining the under-19 team of S.L. Benfica in 1965, his boyhood club from which he had been a registered member since birth.

In 1968, Correia moved to Coimbra to finish high-school and enrol into college, whilst at the same time competing for local Associação Académica also in the Primeira Liga. He only appeared in one game in his first season, but eventually asserted himself as a starter, gathering interest from C.F. Os Belenenses, FC Porto and Sporting Clube de Portugal.

In 1971, Correia accepted an offer from Benfica as Jimmy Hagan acted as the club's manager. He made his debut on 12 September in a 3–1 win over Porto at the Estádio das Antas, going on to help his team win the league with a ten-point advantage over second-placed Vitória F.C. and beat Porto and Sporting in the Taça de Portugal, as the campaign ended with a domestic double and a semi-final run in the European Cup.

During his six-year spell at the Estádio da Luz, Correia won five league titles, one Portuguese Cup and two Taça de Honra trophies. In the summer of 1977, during negotiations for a new contract, the management proposed him a pay cut, which he refused. Instead, Sporting president João Rocha offered him a better deal and the player traded clubs, as he explained: "I never thought of playing in Sporting, but it was the club that offered me the best deal. Benfica, basically, sent me away"; he played there for three years, winning the Portuguese Cup in 1977–78 and the league in 1979–80.

In 1979, Correia joined the New England Tea Men from the North American Soccer League, playing there the first six months of the season and the final six at Sporting. On 23 September 1980, he suffered a stroke that left him permanently incapable of playing professional football; he remained connected with the sport, managing G.D. Sesimbra and Centro Desportivo Universitário de Lisboa and working for Lisbon's city hall.

== International career ==
Correia was part of the Portugal under-23 team in the unsuccessful qualification for the 1972 UEFA European Championship. He earned the first of his 34 caps for the full side on 10 May 1972, in a 1–0 win in Cyprus for the 1974 FIFA World Cup qualifiers.

Correia represented his country in the Brazil Independence Cup, also in 1972. He was regularly called up until 1979, but failed to appear in any major competition.

Artur Correia: International goals
No.	Date	Venue	Opponent	Score	Result	Competition
1	1 November 1979	Estádio Nacional, Lisbon, Portugal	Norway	1–1	3–1	Euro 1980 qualifying

== Style of play ==
Correia was described by João Tomaz and Fernando Arrobas as a modern-day right back, with the physical and technical qualities needed. He could also play as a left back, central defender and in the midfield. After playing against Benfica in the European Cup, AFC Ajax manager Ștefan Kovács praised his technical ability and winning mentality, and elected him as "the best right back in Europe."

== Personal life ==
Correia's younger brother, Pedro, was also a footballer, playing for Benfica at youth level before moving to AD Guarda. The former was nicknamed "Ruço", due to his blonde hair.

In June 2015, Correia had his left leg amputated because of problems related to his circulatory system. On 20 July of the following year, he suffered a second stroke that put him in a coma, and after five days in critical condition he died at the age of 66.

== Honours ==
Benfica

- Primeira Liga: 1971–72, 1972–73, 1974–75, 1975–76, 1976–77
- Taça de Portugal: 1971–72
- Taça de Honra: 1971–72, 1973–74

Sporting

- Primeira Liga: 1979–80
- Taça de Portugal: 1977–78
