= Joaquim Conceição =

Portuguese footballer (1942–2020)

Conceição
Personal information
- Full name: Joaquim Adriano José Conceição
- Date of birth: 8 April 1942
- Place of birth: Luanda, Angola
- Date of death: 14 September 2020 (aged 78)
- Place of death: United States
- Position: Defender

Senior career*
Years	Team	Apps	(Gls)
- Vitória Setúbal

International career
1969	Portugal	5	(0)
- * Club domestic league appearances and goals

Joaquim Adriano José Conceição (8 April 1942 – 14 September 2020) was a Portuguese footballer who played as a defender. He was born was born in Luanda on 8 April 1942 and died on 14 September 2020 in the United States, at the age of 78. He was elder brother of José Maria Júnior (1943–2026).
