= Jorge Calado =

Portuguese footballer

Personal information
- Full name: Jorge Oliveira Calado
- Date of birth: 7 June 1942 (age 84)
- Place of birth: Portuguese Mozambique
- Position: Midfielder

Youth career
- –1961: Benfica

Senior career*
Years	Team	Apps	(Gls)
1961–1971	Benfica	26	(0)
1968–1969	→ Leixões (loan)	22	(2)
1971–1972	União de Tomar	29	(2)
1972–1974	Belenenses	58	(0)
1974–1976	União de Tomar	43	(1)
1975	Boston Minutemen		
1976	Rochester Lancers		
1980–1981	Negrais		
Total		178	(5)
- * Club domestic league appearances and goals

Jorge Oliveira Calado (born 7 June 1942) is a Mozambican-Portuguese retired footballer who played as a midfielder.

== Career ==
Born in Portuguese Mozambique, Jorge Calado is a youth product from S.L. Benfica. He made his professional debut on 26 November 1961, in a win over Caldas. Over the course of seven seasons, acting mainly as back-up to Mário Coluna or Domiciano Cavém, he played 27 league matches, with a loan deal in 1968–69 to Leixões S.C.

In 1971–72, he joined União de Tomar, and later had short spells in United States, retiring in 1981, age 39.

== Honours ==
Benfica

- Primeira Liga: 1963–64, 1964–65, 1966–67, 1967–68, 1970–71
- Taça de Portugal: 1961-62, 1963-64, 1969–70
