= Eurico Caires =

Portuguese footballer

Eurico
Personal information
- Full name: Eurico Mendonça de Caires
- Date of birth: 5 August 1952
- Place of birth: Funchal, Portugal
- Date of death: 13 November 1989 (aged 37)
- Position: Midfielder

Youth career
- 1969–1971: Benfica

Senior career*
Years	Team	Apps	(Gls)
1971–1972	Benfica	1	(0)
1972–1973	Beira-Mar	26	(2)
1973–1974	Montijo	25	(4)
1974–1976	Estoril	28	(1)
1976	Toronto Metros-Croatia	1	(0)
1976	Rochester Lancers	4	(0)
1976–1977	Estoril	28	(5)
1977–1982	Belenenses	63	(4)
1982–1983	Almada		
1983–1984	União Madeira		
1984–1985	Estrela Amadora		
Total		176	(16)
- * Club domestic league appearances and goals

Eurico Mendonça de Caires (5 August 1952 – 13 November 1989), known simply as Eurico, was a Portuguese footballer who played as a midfielder.

He represented clubs in Portugal, Canada and the United States.

== Club career ==
Born in Funchal, Madeira, Eurico played youth football with S.L. Benfica, being promoted to the first team for the 1971–72 season and making one Primeira Liga appearance, as a substitute. He went on to represent, always in the top flight, S.C. Beira-Mar, C.D. Montijo and G.D. Estoril Praia.

At the end of the 1975–76 campaign, Eurico moved abroad to play in the North American Soccer League, having brief spells with Toronto Metros-Croatia and the Rochester Lancers before returning to Portugal with Estoril and C.F. Os Belenenses.

Eurico retired in June 1985 at nearly 33 after three years in the lower leagues, amassing Portuguese top division totals of 171 games and 16 goals. He died seven years later.

== Personal life ==
Caires' son, Bruno Caires, is also a former footballer.
