= José Maria Júnior =

Portuguese footballer (1943–2026)

Personal information
- Date of birth: 7 June 1943
- Place of birth: Luanda, Portuguese Angola
- Date of death: 21 August 2026 (aged 83)
- Place of death: United States
- Position: Midfielder

Senior career*
Years	Team	Apps	(Gls)
1962	Petro Luanda		
1962–1976	Vitória Setúbal	315	(91)
1977	Toronto Blizzard		

International career
	Portugal U21	1	(0)
	Portugal B	1	(0)
1967–1970	Portugal	4	(0)
- * Club domestic league appearances and goals

José Maria Júnior (7 June 1943 – 21 August 2026) was a Portuguese footballer who played as a midfielder. He died in the United States on 21 August 2026, at the age of 83. He was the younger brother of Joaquim Conceição (1942–2020).
