= Fernando Peres =

Portuguese footballer and manager (1943–2019)

Personal information
- Full name: Fernando Peres da Silva
- Date of birth: 8 January 1943
- Place of birth: Algés, Portugal
- Date of death: 10 February 2019 (aged 76)
- Place of death: Lisbon, Portugal
- Position: Winger

Youth career
- 1958–1960: Belenenses

Senior career*
Years	Team	Apps	(Gls)
1960–1965	Belenenses	90	(36)
1965–1973	Sporting CP	145	(40)
1968–1969	→ Académica (loan)	22	(9)
1974	Vasco Gama	10	(1)
1974–1975	Porto	14	(2)
1975	Sport	26	(2)
1976	Treze	7	(1)
Total		314	(91)

International career
1964–1972	Portugal	27	(4)

Managerial career
- 1979–1980: União Leiria
- 1980: Vitória Guimarães
- 1981: Estoril
- 1981: Sanjoanense
- 1993–1994: Juventude Évora
- 1999: Atlético
Medal record
Men's football
Representing Portugal
FIFA World Cup
Third place	1966 England
- * Club domestic league appearances and goals

Fernando Peres da Silva (8 January 1943 – 10 February 2019), known as Peres, was a Portuguese professional football left winger and manager.

== Club career ==
Peres was born in Algés, Oeiras, Lisbon metropolitan area. He played for C.F. Os Belenenses, Sporting CP, Académica de Coimbra and FC Porto in his country; he experienced his best years with the second club, winning four major titles including two Primeira Liga championships and amassing top-tier totals of 271 games and 87 goals over 13 seasons.

On either side of his spell with Porto, Peres competed in Brazil, winning the 1974 national championship with CR Vasco da Gama and the regional league with Sport Club do Recife. He retired with Treze Futebol Clube at the age of 33, going to have a brief stint as coach; his Portuguese top division experience consisted of 26 matches with U.D. Leiria, and seven with Vitória de Guimarães.

== International career ==
Peres earned 27 caps for Portugal, scoring four goals. His debut came on 4 June 1964 in a 1–1 friendly draw with England where he scored his team's goal, and his last appearance was during the Brazil Independence Cup final against the hosts, on 9 June 1972.

Peres was included in the squad for the 1966 FIFA World Cup, but he did not make any appearances in England.

Fernando Peres: International goals
No.	Date	Venue	Opponent	Score	Result	Competition
1	4 June 1964	Estádio do Pacaembu, São Paulo, Brazil	England	1–0	1–1	Taça das Nações
2	4 May 1969	Estádio das Antas, Porto, Portugal	Greece	2–2	2–2	1970 World Cup qualification
3	21 November 1971	Estádio da Luz (1954), Lisbon, Portugal	Belgium	1–1	1–1	Euro 1972 qualifying
4	25 June 1972	Estádio do Arruda, Recife, Brazil	Republic of Ireland	1–0	2–1	Brazil Independence Cup

== Death ==
On 10 February 2019, one month after being admitted in the facility, Peres died at the António Egas Moniz Hospital in Lisbon. He was 76 years old.

== Honours ==
Sporting CP

- Primeira Liga: 1965–66, 1969–70
- Taça de Portugal: 1970–71, 1972–73

Vasco

- Campeonato Brasileiro Série A: 1974

Sport

- Campeonato Pernambucano: 1975

Portugal

- FIFA World Cup third place: 1966
