= Toni (footballer, born 1946) =

Portuguese footballer (born 1946)

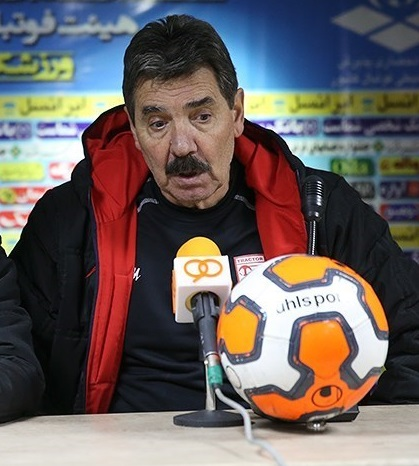
- Toni as Tractor manager in 2013

Personal information
- Full name: António José da Conceição Oliveira
- Date of birth: 14 October 1946 (age 80)
- Place of birth: Mogofores, Portugal
- Height: 1.83 m (6 ft 0 in)
- Position: Midfielder

Youth career
- Salesianos
- 1962–1965: Anadia

Senior career*
| Years | Team | Apps | (Gls) |
| 1965–1968 | Académica | 19 | (0) |
| 1968–1981 | Benfica | 298 | (16) |
| 1977 | → Quicksilvers (loan) | 16 | (0) |
| Total | | 333 | (16) |

International career
| 1967–1971 | Portugal U21 | 6 | (0) |
| 1969–1978 | Portugal | 32 | (0) |

Managerial career
- 1982–1987: Benfica (assistant)
- 1987–1989: Benfica
- 1989–1992: Benfica (assistant)
- 1992–1994: Benfica
- 1994–1995: Bordeaux
- 1995: Sevilla
- 1998–1999: United Arab Emirates (assistant)
- 2000–2001: Benfica
- 2002–2003: Shenyang Jinde
- 2003: Al-Ahly
- 2007–2008: Al-Ittifaq
- 2008–2009: Al-Sharjah
- 2010–2011: Ittihad
- 2012–2013: Tractor
- 2014: Tractor
- 2015: Tractor
- 2017–2019: Kazma
- * Club domestic league appearances and goals

António José da Conceição Oliveira (born 14 October 1946), known as Toni (Portuguese pronunciation: [ˈtɔni]), is a Portuguese former football midfielder and manager.

A Portugal international on more than 30 occasions, his career was mainly associated with Benfica. He totalled 22 major honours with his main club as both a player and manager, and also worked in the latter capacity in six other countries.

== Club career ==
Born in the village of Mogofores in Anadia, Aveiro District, Toni started playing organized football at local Anadia, and joined Académica de Coimbra at the age of 18 when he was signed by manager Mário Wilson. During his spell with the latter club, he was rarely played over three Primeira Liga seasons.

On 9 June 1968, Toni joined Benfica for a transfer fee of 1,305,000 escudos. He scored one goal in 22 games in his debut campaign, helping his team to the national championship.

Toni was part of the legendary Jimmy Hagan-led sides that won back-to-back domestic leagues from 1971–1973, losing only one match in 60; to this feat, he contributed three goals from 50 appearances. Before retiring in 1981 at 34, he appeared in 391 competitive matches with his main club (23 goals), and was named Portuguese Footballer of the Year in 1972.

== International career ==
Toni earned 32 caps for Portugal, his debut coming on 12 October 1969 in a 1–0 away loss against Romania for the 1970 FIFA World Cup qualifiers. His last match occurred eight years later, in a 2–0 friendly defeat in France.

Toni was part of the country's squad at the 1972 Brazil Independence Cup, where they lost to the hosts.

== Coaching career ==
One year after retiring, Toni began working as assistant at Benfica, successively holding the position under Sven-Göran Eriksson, Pál Csernai, John Mortimore and Ebbe Skovdahl. He was promoted to head coach early in the 1987–88 season, and led the team to the second place in the league and the final of the European Cup, lost to PSV Eindhoven on penalties.

Toni managed Benfica to its 28th national championship in the 1988–89 campaign, losing only twice in 38 matches. After replacing fired Tomislav Ivić in November 1992, he won another league in 1994.

Starting in 1994, Toni spent one year working abroad, with Ligue 1 side Bordeaux and Sevilla in the Spanish La Liga. He won the UEFA Intertoto Cup with the former, but was sacked due to poor results in the domestic front; with the latter, he arrived at the Ramón Sánchez-Pizjuán Stadium alongside player Emílio Peixe, being relieved of his duties on 15 October 1995 following a 0–3 home loss against Espanyol.

In 1999, Toni assisted compatriot Carlos Queiroz at the United Arab Emirates national team. In December of the following year, the former returned to Benfica for a third spell after José Mourinho resigned from the position as new president Manuel Vilarinho had declared his intention to bring in Toni during the election campaign, with Mourinho leaving midway through 2000–01.

In the next years, Toni was in charge of Shenyang Jinde (Chinese Super League), Al-Ahly (Egyptian Premier League, winning the domestic Supercup), Ettifaq (Saudi Professional League, leading them to the fourth place) and Al-Sharjah (UAE Arabian Gulf League). During the 2010 FIFA World Cup, he acted as match analyst for Ivory Coast.

Toni returned to Saudi Arabia in summer 2010, reaching the semi-finals of the AFC Champions League with Ittihad. On 9 June 2012, he signed a two-year contract with Iran Pro League club Tractor.

After failing to qualify from the 2013 Champions League group stage, it was announced Toni's contract would not be renewed, and he left in May. However, he returned on 28 January 2014, winning that season's Iranian Hazfi Cup after defeating Sanat Mes Kerman.

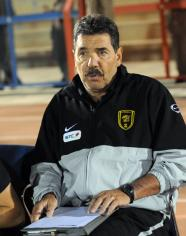
Toni as head coach of Al-Ittihad

On 12 February 2015, Toni returned to Tractor for a third stint after agreeing to a one-and-a-half-year deal. He left his post in December.

== Personal life ==
Toni's son, also named António, was also a football player and manager.

== Managerial statistics ==
As of 30 November 2015

| Team | From | To | Record | | | | |
| Team | From | To | G | W | D | L | Win % |
|---|---|---|---|---|---|---|---|
| Benfica | November 1987 | June 1989 | 87 | 52 | 24 | 11 | 59.77 |
| Benfica | October 1992 | July 1994 | 86 | 57 | 20 | 9 | 66.28 |
| Bordeaux | July 1994 | May 1995 | 34 | 16 | 7 | 11 | 47.06 |
| Sevilla | June 1995 | October 1995 | 10 | 2 | 4 | 4 | 20.00 |
| Benfica | December 2000 | December 2001 | 43 | 17 | 16 | 10 | 39.53 |
| Shenyang Jinde | May 2002 | May 2003 | 31 | 11 | 8 | 12 | 35.48 |
| Al-Ahly | July 2003 | September 2003 | 8 | 3 | 2 | 3 | 37.50 |
| Al-Ittifaq | June 2007 | June 2008 | 28 | 13 | 7 | 8 | 46.43 |
| Al-Sharjah | June 2008 | September 2009 | 26 | 8 | 3 | 15 | 30.77 |
| Ittihad | August 2010 | June 2011 | 23 | 12 | 8 | 3 | 52.17 |
| Tractor | June 2012 | May 2013 | 42 | 20 | 13 | 9 | 47.62 |
| Tractor | January 2014 | June 2014 | 14 | 6 | 2 | 6 | 42.86 |
| Tractor | February 2015 | December 2015 | 32 | 16 | 9 | 7 | 50.00 |
| Kazma | July 2017 | June 2019 | 64 | 27 | 21 | 16 | 42.19 |

== Honours ==
=== Player ===
Académica

- Taça de Portugal runner-up: 1966–67

Benfica

- Primeira Divisão: 1968–69, 1970–71, 1971–72, 1972–73, 1974–75, 1975–76, 1976–77, 1980–81
- Taça de Portugal: 1968–69, 1969–70, 1971–72, 1979–80
- Supertaça Cândido de Oliveira: 1979
- Taça de Honra (6)

Individual

- Portuguese Footballer of the Year: 1972

=== Manager ===
Benfica

- Primeira Divisão: 1988–89, 1993–94
- Taça de Portugal: 1992–93
- Supertaça Cândido de Oliveira runner-up: 1987, 1993
- European Cup runner-up: 1987–88

Bordeaux

- UEFA Intertoto Cup: 1995

Al-Ahly

- Egyptian Super Cup: 2003

Al-Ittifaq

- Saudi Crown Prince Cup runner-up: 2008
- GCC Champions League runner-up: 2007

Ittihad

- King Cup of Champions runner-up: 2011

Tractor

- Iranian Hazfi Cup: 2013–14

Kazma

- Kuwait Federation Cup: 2017–18

Individual

- IFCA Manager of the Month: February 2015
