= Zeca Miglietti =

Mozambican footballer (1943–2006)

Zeca
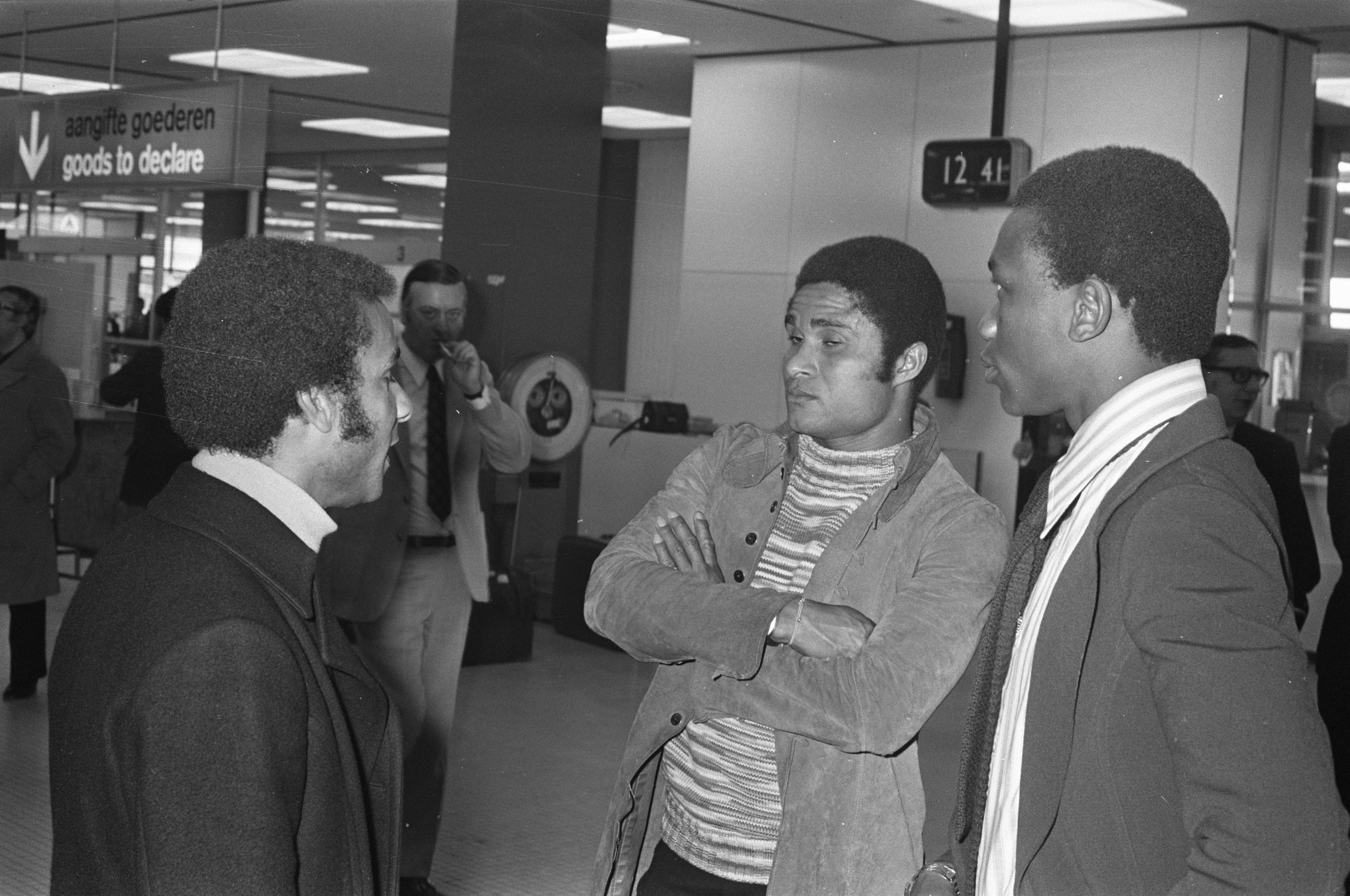

Personal information
- Full name: José Fernandes André Cavaco Miglietti
- Date of birth: 11 August 1943
- Place of birth: Lourenço Marques, Mozambique
- Date of death: 24 December 2006 (aged 63)
- Place of death: Lisbon, Portugal
- Height: 1.74 m (5 ft 9 in)
- Position: Defender

Senior career*
Years	Team	Apps	(Gls)
1966–1974	Benfica	53	(0)
1972–1973	→ Atlético (loan)	22	(0)
1973–1974	→ Oriental (loan)	20	(0)
1974–1976	União de Tomar	45	(0)
1976–1978	Vila Real	24	(0)
1978–1980	Bragança	28	(4)
1980–1981	FC Mogadourense		
1981–1985	Freamunde		
Total		192	(4)
- * Club domestic league appearances and goals

José Fernandes André Cavaco Miglietti (11 August 1943 – 24 December 2006), known as Zeca, was a Mozambican footballer who played mainly as a defender, either in the center or in the left.

Over the course of 8 seasons, Zeca amassed Primeira Liga totals of 140 games, mainly at Benfica.

== Club career ==
Born in Lourenço Marques, Portuguese Mozambique, Zeca came to Portugal influenced by the success of Eusébio, also from Mozambique. He started in reserves for two seasons, until he made its debut on 23 March 1969, with Otto Glória.

In the first two seasons, he is overshadowed by the breakthrough of Humberto Coelho, and also by other more established players, like Jacinto Santos and Humberto Fernandes, leaving him to play in the left-back role. In 1970–71, Zeca played alongside Humberto Coelho in the center of the defence, in a league and cup double in his best individual season. After suffering a debilitating injury, he was loaned by to Atlético CP in 1972, followed by a second loan to Clube Oriental de Lisboa. He signed a permanent deal with U.F.C.I. Tomar in 1974.

He retired shortly in 1985 and managed a number of smaller teams in Azores. He died from respiratory problems on 24 December 2006.

== Personal life ==
He is the older brother of Abel, who played for Benfica and Porto.

== Honours ==
Benfica

- Portuguese League: 1968–69, 1970–71, 1971–72
- Portuguese Cup: 1968–69, 1970–71, 1971–72
