= Adolfo Calisto =

Portuguese footballer (1944–2024)

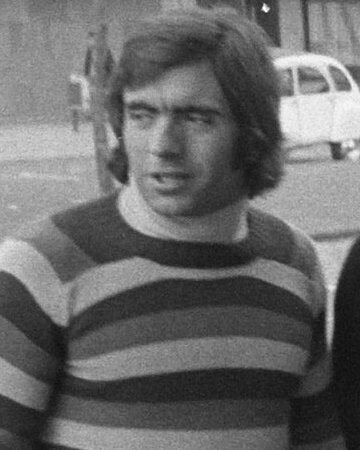
- Calisto in 1972

Personal information
- Full name: Adolfo António da Luz Calisto
- Date of birth: 4 January 1944
- Place of birth: Barreiro, Portugal
- Date of death: 29 August 2024 (aged 80)
- Position: Left-back

Senior career*
| Years | Team | Apps | (Gls) |
| 1960–1962 | Barreirense | | |
| 1965–1975 | Benfica | 300 | (5) |
| 1975–1976 | União Montemor | | |
| 1976–1977 | Portimonense | | |

International career
| 1971–1973 | Portugal | 15 | (1) |

Managerial career
- 1982–1993: CD Alcains
- Benfica de C. Branco
- * Club domestic league appearances and goals

Adolfo António da Luz Calisto (1 January 1944 – 29 August 2024), simply known as Adolfo, was a Portuguese footballer who played left back and was one of the top players for Benfica and the Portugal national team during the 1960s and 1970s.

== Career ==
Born in Barreiro, Portugal, he first attracted attention for his local team of Barreirense, (1960–1962 and 1963–1966), and for Seixal (1962–1963). After that he moved to Benfica, where he played from 1965–66 to 1974–75. He then played for União Montemor (1975–1976) and Portimonense (1976–1977), before ending his career at age 33. He won six championships, and was part of the Benfica squad that reached the 1968 European Cup final. As a Benfica player he achieved the nickname of "Barreiro locomotiv", he was the first wing defender doing the entire corridor.

He had 15 caps for the Portugal national team, scoring 1 goal, and played with the team that reached second place at the Brazil Independence Cup final in 1972, losing only in an epic final with Brazil (1–0), being considered the best wing left defender that year. The Portuguese team, which was largely composed of Benfica players, including veterans Eusébio and Jaime Graça, and youngsters Humberto Coelho and Jordão, lost the final only at the 89th minute, when Jairzinho finally scored.

== Death ==
Adolfo died on 29 August 2024, at the age of 80.

== Career statistics ==
Scores and results list Portugal's goal tally first, score column indicates score after each Calisto goal.

List of international goals scored by Adolfo Calisto
| No. | Date | Venue | Opponent | Score | Result | Competition |
|---|---|---|---|---|---|---|
| 1 | 29 June 1972 | Estádio do Maracanã, Rio de Janeiro, Brazil | Argentina | 1–0 | 3–1 | Brazilian Independence Cup |

== Honours ==
Benfica

- Primeira Divisão: 1967–68, 1968–69, 1970–71, 1971–72, 1972–73, 1974–75
- Taça de Portugal: 1968–69, 1969–70, 1971–72
- European Cup: Runner-up 1967–68
