= 1972–73 Primeira Divisão =

39th season of top-tier Portuguese football

Primeira Liga
- Season: 1972–73
- Champions: Benfica; 20th title
- Matches: 240
- Goals: 691 (2.88 per match)
- Top goalscorer: Eusébio (40 goals)

The 1972–73 Primeira Divisão was the 39th season of top-tier football in Portugal.

== Overview ==
It was contested by 16 teams. S.L. Benfica won the championship, with 28 victories, 0 losses and 2 draws.

This was also the first time that only one of the Big Three finished in the top three spots in the table.

== League standings ==
Pos	Team	Pld	W	D	L	GF	GA	GD	Pts	Qualification or relegation
1	Benfica (C)	30	28	2	0	101	13	+88	58	Qualification to European Cup first round
2	Belenenses	30	14	12	4	53	30	+23	40	Qualification to UEFA Cup first round
3	Vitória de Setúbal	30	16	6	8	65	26	+39	38	Qualification to UEFA Cup first round
4	Porto	30	15	7	8	56	28	+28	37	Qualification to UEFA Cup first round
5	Sporting CP	30	15	7	8	57	31	+26	37	Qualification to Cup Winners' Cup first round
6	Vitória de Guimarães	30	11	11	8	38	38	0	33	
7	Boavista	30	12	7	11	41	47	−6	31	
8	CUF Barreiro	30	11	8	11	38	37	+1	30	
9	Leixões	30	11	8	11	32	45	−13	30	
10	Barreirense	30	9	7	14	43	64	−21	25	
11	Farense	30	8	8	14	27	53	−26	24	
12	Beira-Mar	30	5	13	12	27	57	−30	23	
13	Montijo	30	9	5	16	29	47	−18	23	
14	União de Coimbra (R)	30	5	7	18	22	54	−32	17	Relegation to Segunda Divisão
15	Atlético CP (R)	30	4	9	17	27	52	−25	17	Relegation to Segunda Divisão
16	União de Tomar (R)	30	6	5	19	35	69	−34	17	Relegation to Segunda Divisão

Source: RSSSF
Rules for classification: 1) points; 2) goal difference; 3) number of goals scored.
(C) Champions; (R) Relegated

== Results ==
Home \ Away	ACP	BAR	BEM	BEL	BEN	BOA	CUF	FAR	LEI	MON	POR	SCP	UCO	UTO	VGU	VSE
Atlético CP		1–3	2–2	0–0	0–0	1–3	2–2	2–1	0–1	1–3	0–2	1–0	0–0	4–0	0–1	3–3
Barreirense	1–0		1–1	1–5	0–3	1–1	3–2	4–1	3–1	4–4	0–0	1–4	4–2	1–0	1–1	2–3
Beira-Mar	1–1	0–2		2–2	1–2	1–1	1–2	1–1	0–1	1–1	1–1	0–0	1–1	2–0	1–0	0–0
Belenenses	3–2	4–2	4–0		0–2	1–1	1–0	0–0	4–0	2–1	2–0	2–2	3–1	3–0	2–1	3–2
Benfica	2–0	3–0	9–0	5–0		4–1	2–0	3–0	6–0	6–0	3–2	4–1	6–1	2–1	8–0	3–0
Boavista	3–2	1–2	1–1	2–2	1–3		1–0	2–0	1–1	3–0	1–0	3–2	1–0	3–1	1–1	3–1
CUF Barreiro	2–1	1–1	1–2	1–2	0–1	3–0		1–1	2–0	1–0	0–2	1–1	2–0	2–1	3–1	2–4
Farense	1–1	2–1	3–2	0–0	0–5	2–0	1–0		1–0	2–1	1–1	1–3	2–0	2–0	2–2	0–3
Leixões	1–0	1–0	3–3	1–0	1–5	3–0	2–3	1–1		1–0	3–1	2–2	0–0	4–0	1–1	0–0
Montijo	2–0	1–0	0–1	1–1	0–1	1–0	0–1	2–0	2–0		0–1	0–0	1–0	3–2	1–1	1–3
Porto	5–1	4–0	1–0	1–1	2–2	1–0	1–1	4–1	0–1	4–1		0–1	3–0	4–1	1–2	2–0
Sporting CP	4–1	5–1	4–0	1–0	1–2	1–0	0–1	4–0	0–1	4–1	0–3		3–1	4–0	2–0	1–0
União de Coimbra	1–0	2–2	0–1	1–1	0–4	2–3	1–1	1–0	2–0	0–1	0–2	1–5		3–0	1–0	0–0
União de Tomar	0–1	3–1	8–1	0–6	0–2	2–4	1–1	3–1	1–1	2–1	1–7	1–1	1–0		1–2	1–0
Vitória de Guimarães	0–0	3–1	2–0	0–0	1–2	4–0	1–1	1–0	2–1	1–0	1–1	1–1	3–1	3–3		1–0
Vitória de Setúbal	5–0	5–0	3–0	0–0	0–1	4–0	3–1	5–0	5–0	4–0	3–0	2–0	4–0	1–1	2–1	

Legend: Blue = home team win; Yellow = draw; Red = away team win.

== Season statistics ==
=== Top goalscorers ===
Rank	Player	Club	Goals
1	(Portugal) Eusébio	Benfica	40
2	(Brazil) Flávio Minuano	Porto	21
3	(Argentina) Héctor Yazalde	Sporting	19
4	(Portugal) Nélson	Sporting	18
5	(Brazil) Duda	Vitória de Setúbal	17
5	(Portugal) Abel	Porto	17
7	(Paraguay) Francisco González	Belenenses	16
8	(Portugal) Arcanjo	Vitória de Setúbal	14
8	(Portugal) Moinhos	Boavista	14
10	(Portugal) José Torres	Vitória de Setúbal	13
