= 1971–72 Primeira Divisão =

38th season of top-tier Portuguese football

Primeira Liga
- Season: 1971–72
- Champions: Benfica; 19th title
- Matches: 240
- Goals: 638 (2.66 per match)

The 1971–72 Primeira Divisão was the 38th season of top-tier football in Portugal.

== Overview ==
It was contested by 16 teams, and S.L. Benfica won the championship.

== League standings ==
Pos	Team	Pld	W	D	L	GF	GA	GD	Pts	Qualification or relegation
1	Benfica (C)	30	26	3	1	81	16	+65	55	Qualification to European Cup first round
2	Vitória de Setúbal	30	17	11	2	62	16	+46	45	Qualification to UEFA Cup first round
3	Sporting CP	30	17	9	4	51	26	+25	43	Qualification to Cup Winners' Cup first round (Note: Sporting qualified for the Cup Winners' Cup as runners-up of the 1972 Taça de Portugal Final, because Taça de Portugal winners, Benfica qualified for the European Cup.)
4	CUF Barreiro	30	12	13	5	43	28	+15	37	Qualification to UEFA Cup first round
5	Porto	30	13	7	10	51	32	+19	33	Qualification to UEFA Cup first round
6	Vitória de Guimarães	30	11	8	11	49	47	+2	30	
7	Belenenses	30	11	7	12	35	33	+2	29	
8	Barreirense	30	11	5	14	34	46	−12	27	
9	Farense	30	9	7	14	34	48	−14	25	
10	Atlético CP	30	8	9	13	35	52	−17	25	
11	Boavista	30	7	10	13	28	46	−18	24	
12	União de Tomar	30	9	5	16	25	42	−17	23	
13	Beira-Mar	30	7	9	14	29	51	−22	23	
14	Leixões	30	7	7	16	26	51	−25	21	
15	Académica (R)	30	7	7	16	29	38	−9	21	Relegation to Segunda Divisão
16	Tirsense (R)	30	6	7	17	26	66	−40	19	Relegation to Segunda Divisão

Source: RSSSF
(C) Champions; (R) Relegated

== Results ==
Home \ Away	ACA	ACP	BAR	BEM	BEL	BEN	BOA	CUF	FAR	LEI	POR	SCP	TIR	UTO	VGU	VSE
Académica		0–2	2–0	0–1	2–0	0–3	3–1	0–1	0–0	0–0	0–1	3–3	1–1	3–0	4–1	0–2
Atlético CP	1–1		1–0	2–3	1–1	1–5	1–1	0–1	3–2	2–0	1–1	0–0	2–1	2–0	2–2	2–2
Barreirense	1–0	2–1		4–0	1–2	1–0	0–1	0–2	3–1	4–0	1–1	1–2	2–1	0–3	2–2	1–1
Beira Mar	1–0	5–0	1–2		1–3	1–3	1–1	1–1	1–1	0–0	1–5	0–1	0–0	2–1	2–1	2–2
Belenenses	0–1	3–1	1–2	0–0		0–1	4–1	1–1	2–1	0–1	3–2	2–1	1–0	2–0	0–1	0–0
Benfica	3–1	5–1	5–1	2–1	1–0		2–0	1–1	2–0	6–0	1–0	2–1	7–0	3–0	3–0	0–0
Boavista	2–0	2–1	1–2	0–0	2–0	2–2		2–0	1–0	1–3	1–2	1–1	1–1	2–0	0–1	1–1
CUF Barreiro	2–2	1–1	1–1	5–1	0–1	0–2	2–0		2–1	4–0	1–0	0–0	4–0	2–1	5–3	2–2
Farense	4–2	3–1	1–0	2–0	3–1	2–5	1–1	2–2		4–3	0–0	1–1	2–0	1–0	1–0	0–2
Leixões	1–0	0–1	2–0	2–1	1–3	0–1	0–0	0–0	1–0		0–1	1–3	1–1	0–1	1–1	1–3
Porto	2–3	1–3	1–1	1–0	3–2	1–3	6–0	1–0	2–0	2–0		0–0	6–0	1–1	1–2	0–1
Sporting CP	1–0	2–0	3–0	0–1	2–1	0–3	4–1	3–0	2–0	2–2	2–1		3–2	2–0	3–0	0–0
Tirsense	1–0	1–0	0–1	1–1	1–0	0–3	1–0	1–1	2–0	2–4	3–3	3–5		1–0	1–2	0–1
União de Tomar	2–1	3–1	4–1	2–0	0–0	0–1	0–0	1–1	0–0	1–0	0–2	0–2	2–0		3–2	0–3
Vitória de Guimarães	0–0	1–1	2–0	5–1	1–1	1–3	2–1	0–0	5–1	3–2	0–4	1–2	7–1	2–0		1–1
Vitória de Setúbal	1–0	3–0	4–0	4–0	1–1	1–3	5–1	0–1	4–0	4–0	2–0	0–0	6–0	5–0	1–0	

Legend: Blue = home team win; Yellow = draw; Red = away team win.

== Season statistics ==
=== Top goalscorers ===
Rank	Player	Club	Goals
1	(Portugal) Artur Jorge	Benfica	27
2	(Portugal) José Torres	Vitória de Setúbal	21
3	(Portugal) Abel	Porto	19
4	(Portugal) Eusébio	Benfica	18
4	(Brazil) Flávio Minuano	Porto	18
6	(Portugal) Jorge Gonçalves	Vitória de Guimarães	15
6	(Portugal) Tito	Vitória de Guimarães	15
8	(Portugal) Arcanjo	Vitória de Setúbal	12
8	(Portugal) Manuel António	Académica de Coimbra	12
8	(Portugal) José Monteiro	Fabril Barreiro	12
8	(Portugal) Serafim	Barreirense	12
