= Abel Miglietti =

Portuguese footballer

Abel
Personal information
- Full name: Abel Fernando Miglietti
- Date of birth: 4 March 1946 (age 80)
- Place of birth: Maputo, Mozambique
- Position: Forward

Senior career*
Years	Team	Apps	(Gls)
1967–1968	Benfica (reserves)		
1968–1970	Benfica	12	(1)
1970–1976	FC Porto	138	(64)
1976–1978	Beira-Mar		
1978–1981	Penafiel		
1981–1984	Tung Sing	36	(5)

International career
1972–1973	Portugal	4	(0)
- * Club domestic league appearances and goals

Abel Fernando Miglietti (born 4 March 1946 in Maputo) is a former Portuguese footballer who played as forward.

He is the younger brother of Zeca.

== International career ==
Abel gained 4 caps for Portugal and made his debut 10 May 1972 in Nicosia against Cyprus, in a 1-0 win.
