= 1973 Taça de Portugal final =

- Event: 1972–73 Taça de Portugal
Sporting CP	Vitória de Setúbal
3	2
- Date: 17 June 1973
- Venue: Estádio Nacional, Oeiras
- Referee: Fernando Leite (Porto)

The 1973 Taça de Portugal final was the final match of the 1972–73 Taça de Portugal, the 33rd season of the Taça de Portugal, the premier Portuguese football cup competition organized by the Portuguese Football Federation (FPF). The match was played on 17 June 1973 at the Estádio Nacional in Oeiras, and opposed two Primeira Liga sides: Sporting CP and Vitória de Setúbal. Sporting CP defeated Vitória de Setúbal 3–2 to claim the Taça de Portugal for an eighth time.

== Match ==
=== Details ===
17 June 1973

Sporting CP	3–2	Vitória de Setúbal
Fernandes 23'; Yazalde 34'; Tomé 66'		Duda 76'; Belmondo 86'

Estádio Nacional, Oeiras
Referee: Fernando Leite (Porto)

Sporting CP	Vitória de Setúbal

GK	1	(Portugal) Vítor Damas
DF	(Portugal) João Laranjeira
DF	(Portugal) Vitorino Bastos
DF	(Portugal) Carlos Alhinho
DF	(Portugal) Manaca (c)
MF	(Portugal) Fernando Tomé	(substituted off) 80'
MF	(Portugal) Nélson Fernandes
MF	(Brazil) Wágner Canotilho
FW	(Portugal) Marinho
FW	(Argentina) Héctor Yazalde	(substituted off) 80'
FW	(Portugal) Joaquim Dinis
Substitutes:
DF	(Portugal) Hilário	(substituted on) 80'
MF	(Portugal) Chico Faria	(substituted on) 80'
Manager:
(Portugal) Mário Lino

GK	1	(Portugal) Joaquim Torres
DF	(Portugal) Francisco Rebelo
DF	(Portugal) José Mendes (c)
DF	(Portugal) João Cardoso
MF	(Portugal) Carriço
MF	(Portugal) Francisco Amâncio
MF	(Uruguay) Henrique Campora	Substituted off
MF	(Portugal) José Maria
MF	(Portugal) Jacinto João	Substituted off
FW	(Brazil) Duda
FW	(Portugal) José Augusto Torres
Substitutes:
MF	(Brazil) Vicente Belmondo	Substituted on
FW	(Portugal) Joaquim Arcanjo	Substituted on
Manager:
(Portugal) José Maria Pedroto

1972–73 Taça de Portugal Winners
Sporting CP
8th Title

Match officials

- Assistant referees:
- Fourth official:

Match rules

- 90 minutes.
- 30 minutes of extra time if necessary.
- Maximum of two substitutions
