= CA Independiente in international football =

Independiente in international football
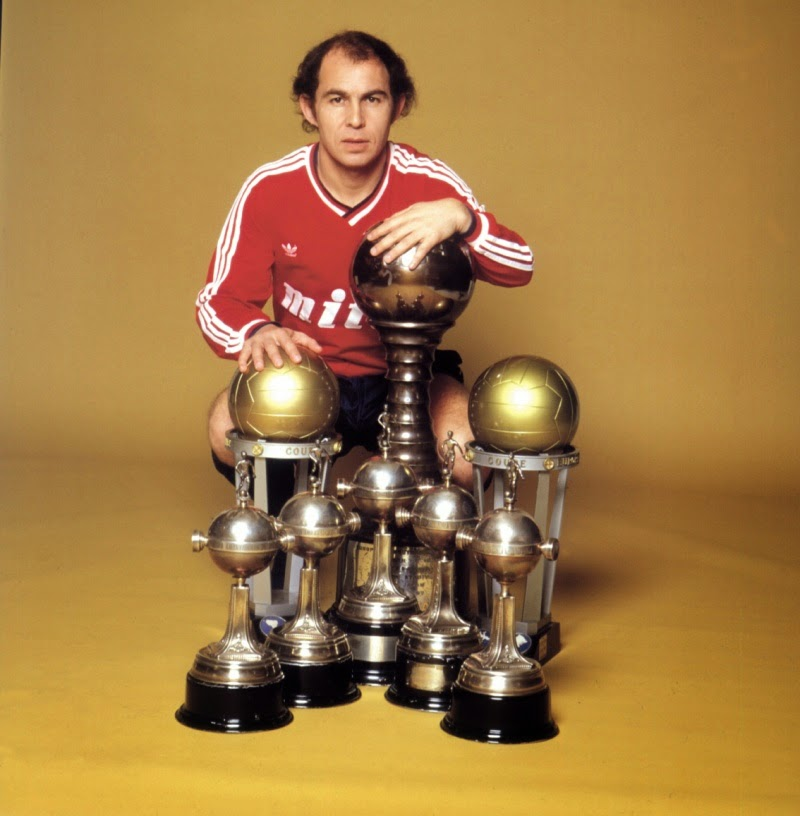
- Ricardo Bochini with all the trophies he won with Independiente
- Club: Independiente

Titles
- Intercontinental Cup: 2: 1973; 1984
- Copa Libertadores: 7: 1964; 1965; 1972; 1973; 1974; 1975; 1984
- Copa Sudamericana: 2: 2010; 2017
- Recopa Sudamericana: 1: 1995
- Supercopa Libertadores: 2: 1994; 1995
- Copa Interamericana: 3: 1972; 1974; 1975

Club Atlético Independiente has success at the Argentine football level, but they are widely known for their international titles and appearances, being nicknamed Rey de Copas (King of Cups) by the media and his fans. The first international cup they took part was the 1917 Tie Cup, which they lost to Uruguayan team Montevideo Wanderers. In term of international honours, Independiente has won a total of 20 major titles, with 18 of them organised by CONMEBOL which makes Independiente the most winning team in this category, together with Boca Juniors. Among those international CONMEBOL titles Independiente has a record seven Copa Libertadores, two Intercontinental Cups, two Copa Sudamericana and one Recopa Sudamericana. International titles also include two Copa Aldao, organised by AFA and AUF together.

Independiente is alongside River Plate and Internacional the only teams to win all four of the current CONMEBOL competitions; Libertadores, Sudamericana, Recopa and the Suruga Bank Championship, which they won in 2018.

Although being far behind Boca Juniors and River Plate in terms of popularity, Independiente was voted by the IFFHS as the 2nd best club in South America in the 20th century, and best team in Argentina.

== First half of the 20th century ==
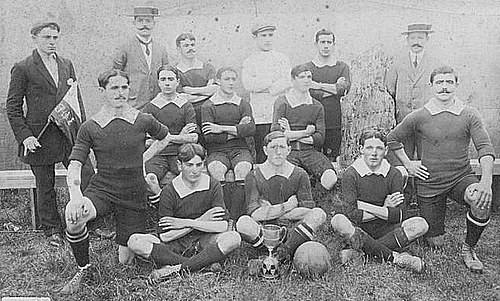
Independiente's 1909 squad, which played the team's first international game that same year

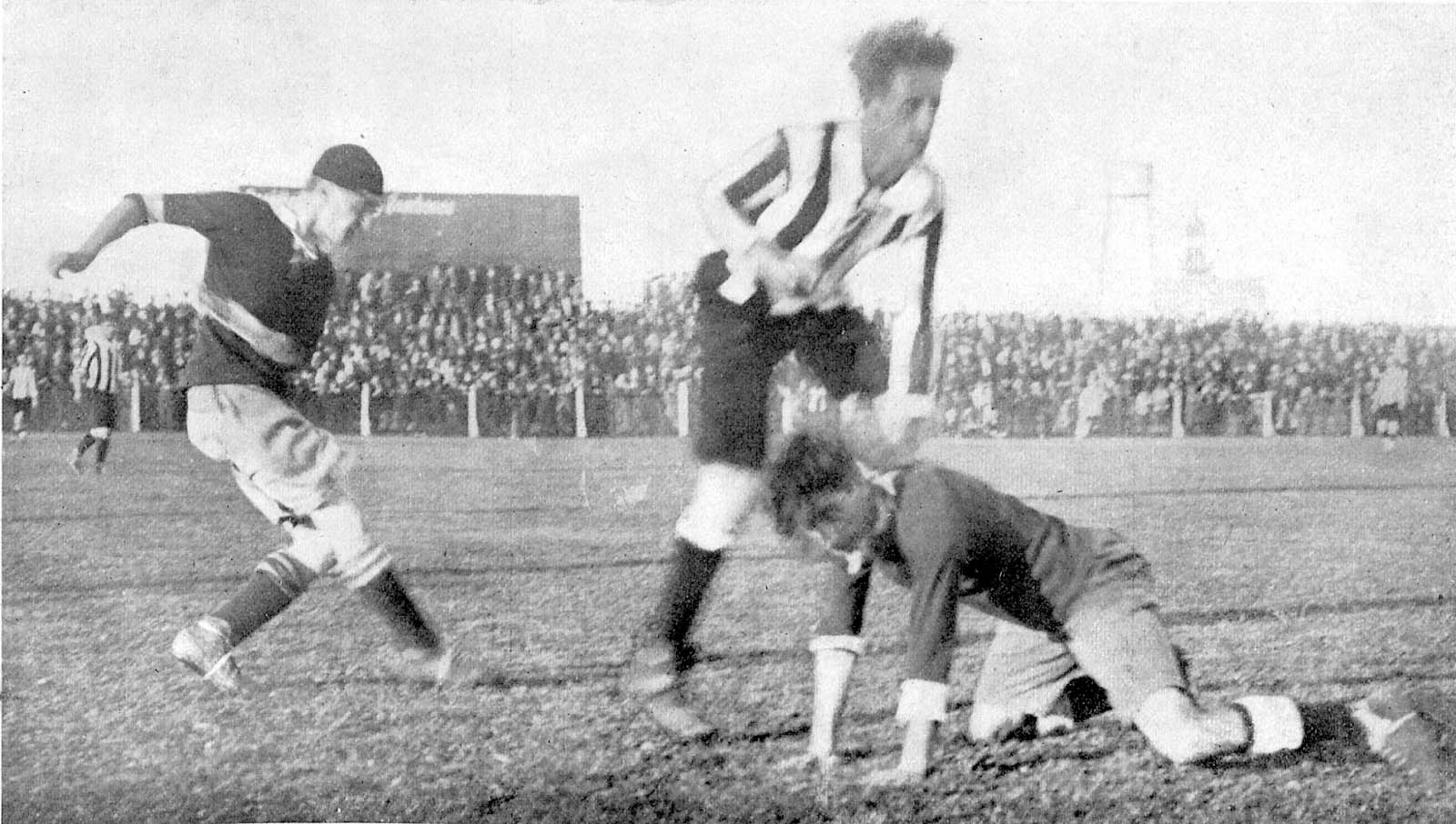
First official international match, the 1917 Tie Cup Final versus Montevideo Wanderers

Independiente began to play friendly games against teams from the neighbouring regions in Uruguay only four years after its foundation. On 25 August 1909, Independiente tied with the now defunct Uruguayan team Bristol in Avellaneda, while still being a lower division team in Argentina. The next friendly international games took place in 1912.

- vs. (Uruguay) Bristol, 0–0 (1909); first international match
- vs. (Uruguay) Universal, 3–0 (1912); first international trophy
- vs. (Uruguay) River Plate, 0–2 (1912); first match outside Argentina

In 1917, Independiente won the national Copa de Competencia Jockey Club, thus earning qualification to the 1917 Tie Cup Final, one of the first official international cups organized between the Argentine Football Association and the Uruguayan Football Association. One year later, the team would qualify again for an international cup.

| Year | Opponent | Score | Venue | Competition |
|---|---|---|---|---|
| 1917 | (Uruguay) Montevideo Wanderers | 0–4 | Estadio G.E.B.A., Buenos Aires, Argentina (Note: Match was originally played at Estadio Alsina y Colón, Avellaneda, and later abandoned at 86'. Score stood and the competition was later resumed at the Estadio G.E.B.A., Buenos Aires.) | Tie Cup |
| 1918 | (Uruguay) Peñarol | 0–4 | Parque Pereira, Montevideo, Uruguay | Copa de Honor Cousenier |

Independiente would have qualified to the Copa Aldao after winning the 1922 and 1926 Argentine championships (the first ones in its history), but the competition was on hiatus around that years. However, Independiente found participation in other anecdotal football matches.

- vs. (Scotland) Third Lanark, 2–1 (1923); first match against a European team
- vs. (Uruguay) Peñarol, 2–2 (1928); inaugural match of Independiente's Estadio Almirante Cordero, the first concrete stadium in South America
- vs. (Spain) Barcelona, 4–1 (1928); first match against a European champion
- vs. (United States) Hakoah All-Stars, 0–0 (1930); first match against a North American team

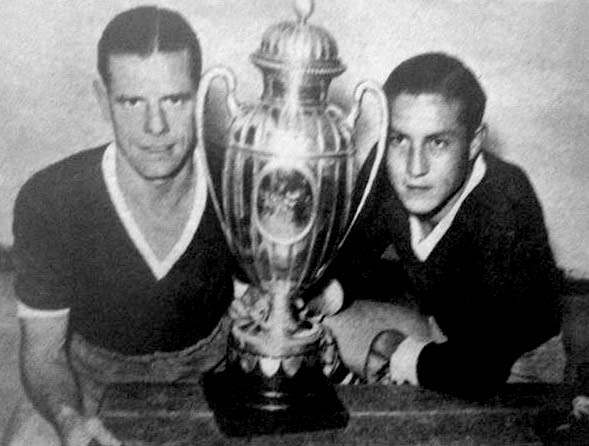
Antonio Sastre and Arsenio Erico with the 1938 Copa Aldao, the team's first international title

Both editions in which Independiente took participation at the Copa Aldao resulted in the first official international victories for the red team. In addition to this, Independiente should have participated in a 1948 edition as 1948 Argentine Primera División champions, but it was never done since the Uruguayan Primera División of that year was cancelled.

| Year | Opponent | Score | Venue |
|---|---|---|---|
| 1938 | (Uruguay) Peñarol | 3–1 | Estadio Centenario, Montevideo, Uruguay |
| 1939 | (Uruguay) Nacional | 5–0 | Estadio Gasómetro, Buenos Aires, Argentina |

Rioplatense cups progressively stopped being contested regularly since 1940 after the Copa Aldao of that year was abandoned, so friendly football was, again, the only mean to participate at international stage. The Copa Libertadores was founded in 1960.

- vs. (Mexico) Atlante, 3–3 (1948); first match outside South America
- vs. (Spain) Real Madrid, 6–0 (1953); first match in Europe

== Copa Libertadores ==
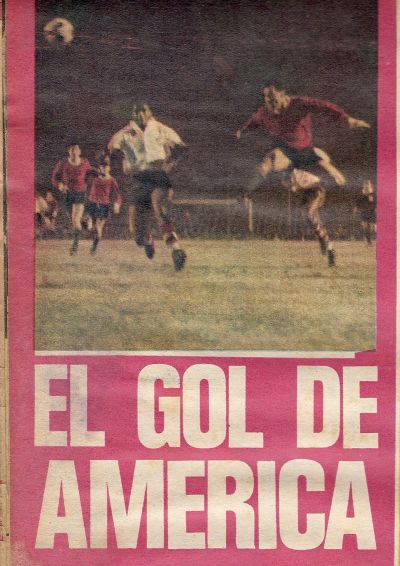
Mario Rodríguez scoring at the 1964 Copa Libertadores Finals to give the team his first Libertadores.

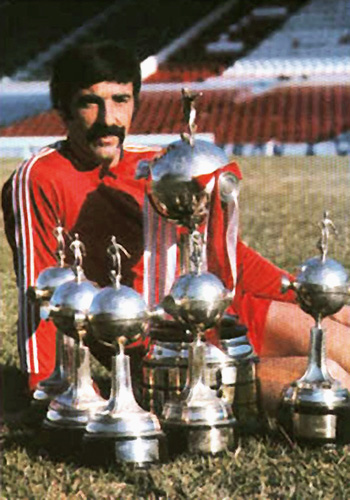
Ricardo Pavoni and six Libertadores trophies at Independiente's former stadium.

Independiente is the most successful team in the competition with 7 titles, with 4 of them in a row between 1972 and 1975. A total of 7 finals were played by Independiente, winning all of them. El Rojo was also the first Argentine team to win the competition.

| Year | Stage | Match | Opponent | Score | Venue |
|---|---|---|---|---|---|
| 1961 | Quarter-finals | 1st Leg | (Brazil) Palmeiras | 0–2 | El Cilindro, Avellaneda, Argentina |
| 1961 | Quarter-finals | 2nd Leg | (Brazil) Palmeiras | 0–1 | Estádio do Pacaembu, São Paulo, Brazil |
| 1964 | Group stage | Match 1 | (Peru) Alianza Lima | 4–0 | La Doble Visera, Avellaneda, Argentina |
| 1964 | Group stage | Match 2 | (Peru) Alianza Lima | 2–2 | El Cilindro, Avellaneda, Argentina |
| 1964 | Group stage | Match 3 | (Colombia) Millonarios | 5–1 | La Doble Visera, Avellaneda, Argentina |
| 1964 | Group stage | Match 4 | (Colombia) Millonarios | w.o. | None (Note: The Colombian representative was disqualified by CONMEBOL and Independiente was given a scoreless win, without travelling to Colombia.) |
| 1964 | Semi-final | 1st leg | (Brazil) Santos | 3–2 | Estádio do Maracanã, Rio de Janeiro, Brazil |
| 1964 | Semi-final | 2nd leg | (Brazil) Santos | 2–1 | La Doble Visera, Avellaneda, Argentina |
| 1964 | Final | 1st leg | (Uruguay) Nacional | 0–0 | Estadio Centenario, Montevideo, Uruguay |
| 1964 | Final | 2nd leg | (Uruguay) Nacional | 1–0 | La Doble Visera, Avellaneda, Argentina |
| 1965 | Semi-final | 1st leg | (Argentina) Boca Juniors | 2–0 | El Monumental, Buenos Aires, Argentina |
| 1965 | Semi-final | 2nd leg | (Argentina) Boca Juniors | 0–1 | El Monumental, Buenos Aires, Argentina |
| 1965 | Semi-final | Play-off | (Argentina) Boca Juniors | 0–0 (aet) | El Monumental, Buenos Aires, Argentina |
| 1965 | Final | 1st leg | (Uruguay) Peñarol | 1–0 | La Doble Visera, Avellaneda, Argentina |
| 1965 | Final | 2nd leg | (Uruguay) Peñarol | 1–3 | Estadio Centenario, Montevideo, Uruguay |
| 1965 | Final | Play-off | (Uruguay) Peñarol | 4–1 | Estadio Nacional, Santiago, Chile |
| 1966 | 2nd group stage | Match 1 | (Argentina) Boca Juniors | 2–0 | La Bombonera, Buenos Aires, Argentina |
| 1966 | 2nd group stage | Match 2 | (Argentina) River Plate | 1–1 | La Doble Visera, Avellaneda, Argentina |
| 1966 | 2nd group stage | Match 3 | (Paraguay) Guaraní | 2–0 | Estadio Defensores del Chaco, Asunción, Paraguay |
| 1966 | 2nd group stage | Match 4 | (Argentina) River Plate | 2–4 | El Monumental, Buenos Aires, Argentina |
| 1966 | 2nd group stage | Match 5 | (Paraguay) Guaraní | 2–1 | La Doble Visera, Avellaneda, Argentina |
| 1966 | 2nd group stage | Match 6 | (Argentina) Boca Juniors | 0–0 | La Doble Visera, Avellaneda, Argentina |
| 1966 | 2nd group stage | Play-off | (Argentina) River Plate | 1–2 | Estadio Gasómetro, Buenos Aires, Argentina |
| 1968 | 1st group stage | Match 1 | (Argentina) Estudiantes | 2–4 | La Doble Visera, Avellaneda, Argentina |
| 1968 | 1st group stage | Match 2 | (Colombia) Millonarios | 2–1 | Estadio El Campín, Bogotá, Colombia |
| 1968 | 1st group stage | Match 3 | (Colombia) Deportivo Cali | 0–1 | Estadio Pascual Guerrero, Cali, Colombia |
| 1968 | 1st group stage | Match 4 | (Colombia) Millonarios | 3–1 | La Doble Visera, Avellaneda, Argentina |
| 1968 | 1st group stage | Match 5 | (Colombia) Deportivo Cali | 1–1 | La Doble Visera, Avellaneda, Argentina |
| 1968 | 1st group stage | Match 6 | (Argentina) Estudiantes | 0–2 | Estadio Jorge Luis Hirschi, La Plata, Argentina |
| 1968 | 1st group stage | Play-off | (Colombia) Deportivo Cali | 3–2 | Estadio Nacional, Lima, Peru |
| 1968 | 2nd group stage | Match 1 | (Peru) Universitario | 3–0 | Estadio Nacional, Lima, Peru |
| 1968 | 2nd group stage | Match 2 | (Argentina) Estudiantes | 1–2 | La Doble Visera, Avellaneda, Argentina |
| 1968 | 2nd group stage | Match 3 | (Argentina) Estudiantes | 0–1 | Estadio Jorge Luis Hirschi, La Plata, Argentina |
| 1968 | 2nd group stage | Match 4 | (Peru) Universitario | 3–0 | La Doble Visera, Avellaneda, Argentina |
| 1972 | 1st group stage | Match 1 | (Argentina) Rosario Central | 2–2 | Estadio Gigante de Arroyito, Rosario, Argentina |
| 1972 | 1st group stage | Match 2 | (Colombia) Atlético Nacional | 1–1 | Estadio Atanasio Girardot, Medellín, Colombia |
| 1972 | 1st group stage | Match 3 | (Colombia) Santa Fe | 4–2 | Estadio El Campín, Bogotá, Colombia |
| 1972 | 1st group stage | Match 4 | (Argentina) Rosario Central | 2–0 | La Doble Visera, Avellaneda, Argentina |
| 1972 | 1st group stage | Match 5 | (Colombia) Santa Fe | 2–0 | La Doble Visera, Avellaneda, Argentina |
| 1972 | 1st group stage | Match 6 | (Colombia) Atlético Nacional | 2–0 | La Doble Visera, Avellaneda, Argentina |
| 1972 | 2nd group stage | Match 1 | (Ecuador) Barcelona | 1–1 | Estadio Modelo, Guayaquil, Ecuador |
| 1972 | 2nd group stage | Match 2 | (Ecuador) Barcelona | 1–0 | La Doble Visera, Avellaneda, Argentina |
| 1972 | 2nd group stage | Match 3 | (Brazil) São Paulo | 0–1 | Estádio do Pacaembu, São Paulo, Brazil |
| 1972 | 2nd group stage | Match 4 | (Brazil) São Paulo | 2–0 | La Doble Visera, Avellaneda, Argentina |
| 1972 | Final | 1st Leg | (Peru) Universitario | 0–0 | Estadio Nacional, Lima, Peru |
| 1972 | Final | 2nd Leg | (Peru) Universitario | 2–1 | La Doble Visera, Avellaneda, Argentina |
| 1973 | 2nd group stage | Match 1 | (Colombia) Millonarios | 0–1 | Estadio El Campín, Bogotá, Colombia |
| 1973 | 2nd group stage | Match 2 | (Colombia) Millonarios | 2–0 | La Doble Visera, Avellaneda, Argentina |
| 1973 | 2nd group stage | Match 3 | (Argentina) San Lorenzo | 2–2 | Estadio Gasómetro, Buenos Aires, Argentina |
| 1973 | 2nd group stage | Match 4 | (Argentina) San Lorenzo | 1–0 | La Doble Visera, Avellaneda, Argentina |
| 1973 | Final | 1st Leg | (Chile) Colo-Colo | 1–1 | La Doble Visera, Avellaneda, Argentina |
| 1973 | Final | 2nd Leg | (Chile) Colo-Colo | 0–0 | Estadio Nacional de Chile, Santiago, Chile |
| 1973 | Final | Play-off | (Chile) Colo-Colo | 2–1 (aet) | Estadio Centenario, Montevideo, Uruguay |
| 1974 | 2nd group stage | Match 1 | (Argentina) Huracán | 1–1 | Estadio Tomás Adolfo Ducó, Buenos Aires, Argentina |
| 1974 | 2nd group stage | Match 2 | (Uruguay) Peñarol | 3–2 | Estadio Centenario, Montevideo, Uruguay |
| 1974 | 2nd group stage | Match 3 | (Argentina) Huracán | 3–0 | La Doble Visera, Avellaneda, Argentina |
| 1974 | 2nd group stage | Match 4 | (Uruguay) Peñarol | 1–1 | La Doble Visera, Avellaneda, Argentina |
| 1974 | Final | 1st Leg | (Brazil) São Paulo | 1–2 | Estádio do Pacaembu, São Paulo, Brazil |
| 1974 | Final | 2nd Leg | (Brazil) São Paulo | 2–0 | La Doble Visera, Avellaneda, Argentina |
| 1974 | Final | Play-off | (Brazil) São Paulo | 1–0 | Estadio Nacional de Chile, Santiago, Chile |
| 1975 | 2nd group stage | Match 1 | (Argentina) Rosario Central | 0–2 | Estadio Gigante de Arroyito, Rosario, Argentina |
| 1975 | 2nd group stage | Match 2 | (Brazil) Cruzeiro | 0–2 | Mineirão, Belo Horizonte, Brazil |
| 1975 | 2nd group stage | Match 3 | (Argentina) Rosario Central | 2–0 | La Doble Visera, Avellaneda, Argentina |
| 1975 | 2nd group stage | Match 4 | (Brazil) Cruzeiro | 3–0 | La Doble Visera, Avellaneda, Argentina |
| 1975 | Final | 1st Leg | (Chile) Unión Española | 0–1 | Estadio Nacional de Chile, Santiago, Chile |
| 1975 | Final | 2nd Leg | (Chile) Unión Española | 3–1 | La Doble Visera, Avellaneda, Argentina |
| 1975 | Final | Play-off | (Chile) Unión Española | 2–0 | Estadio Defensores del Chaco, Asunción, Paraguay |
| 1976 | 2nd group stage | Match 1 | (Argentina) River Plate | 0–0 | El Monumental, Buenos Aires, Argentina |
| 1976 | 2nd group stage | Match 2 | (Uruguay) Peñarol | 1–0 | La Doble Visera, Avellaneda, Argentina |
| 1976 | 2nd group stage | Match 3 | (Argentina) River Plate | 0–1 | La Doble Visera, Avellaneda, Argentina |
| 1976 | 2nd group stage | Match 4 | (Uruguay) Peñarol | 1–0 | Estadio Centenario, Montevideo, Uruguay |
| 1976 | 2nd group stage | Play-off | (Argentina) River Plate | 0–1 | Estadio José Amalfitani, Buenos Aires, Argentina |
| 1978 | 1st group stage | Match 1 | (Ecuador) Liga de Quito | 0–1 | Estadio Olímpico Atahualpa, Quito, Ecuador |
| 1978 | 1st group stage | Match 2 | (Ecuador) El Nacional | 2–1 | Estadio Olímpico Atahualpa, Quito, Ecuador |
| 1978 | 1st group stage | Match 3 | (Argentina) River Plate | 0–0 | La Doble Visera, Avellaneda, Argentina |
| 1978 | 1st group stage | Match 4 | (Ecuador) El Nacional | 2–0 | La Doble Visera, Avellaneda, Argentina |
| 1978 | 1st group stage | Match 5 | (Ecuador) Liga de Quito | 2–0 | La Doble Visera, Avellaneda, Argentina |
| 1978 | 1st group stage | Match 6 | (Argentina) River Plate | 0–0 | El Monumental, Buenos Aires, Argentina |
| 1978 | 1st group stage | Play-off | (Argentina) River Plate | 1–4 | Estadio José Amalfitani, Buenos Aires, Argentina |
| 1979 | 1st group stage | Match 1 | (Argentina) Quilmes | 2–1 | Estadio Centenario, Quilmes, Argentina |
| 1979 | 1st group stage | Match 2 | (Colombia) Millonarios | 3–3 | Estadio El Campín, Bogotá, Colombia |
| 1979 | 1st group stage | Match 3 | (Colombia) Deportivo Cali | 0–1 | Estadio Pascual Guerrero, Cali, Colombia |
| 1979 | 1st group stage | Match 4 | (Argentina) Quilmes | 2–0 | La Doble Visera, Avellaneda, Argentina |
| 1979 | 1st group stage | Match 5 | (Colombia) Deportivo Cali | 1–0 | La Doble Visera, Avellaneda, Argentina |
| 1979 | 1st group stage | Match 6 | (Colombia) Millonarios | 4–1 | La Doble Visera, Avellaneda, Argentina |
| 1979 | 2nd group stage | Match 1 | (Uruguay) Peñarol | 0–0 | Estadio Centenario, Montevideo, Uruguay |
| 1979 | 2nd group stage | Match 2 | (Argentina) Boca Juniors | 1–0 | La Doble Visera, Avellaneda, Argentina |
| 1979 | 2nd group stage | Match 3 | (Uruguay) Peñarol | 1–0 | La Doble Visera, Avellaneda, Argentina |
| 1979 | 2nd group stage | Match 4 | (Argentina) Boca Juniors | 0–2 | La Bombonera, Buenos Aires, Argentina |
| 1979 | 2nd group stage | Play-off | (Argentina) Boca Juniors | 0–1 (aet) | El Monumental, Buenos Aires, Argentina |
| 1984 | 1st group stage | Match 1 | (Argentina) Estudiantes | 1–1 | Estadio Jorge Luis Hirschi, La Plata, Buenos Aires |
| 1984 | 1st group stage | Match 2 | (Paraguay) Sportivo Luqueño | 1–0 | Estadio Defensores del Chaco, Asunción, Paraguay |
| 1984 | 1st group stage | Match 3 | (Paraguay) Olimpia | 0–1 | Estadio Defensores del Chaco, Asunción, Paraguay |
| 1984 | 1st group stage | Match 4 | (Paraguay) Sportivo Luqueño | 2–0 | La Doble Visera, Avellaneda, Argentina |
| 1984 | 1st group stage | Match 5 | (Argentina) Estudiantes | 4–1 | La Doble Visera, Avellaneda, Argentina |
| 1984 | 1st group stage | Match 6 | (Paraguay) Olimpia | 3–2 | La Doble Visera, Avellaneda, Argentina |
| 1984 | 2nd group stage | Match 1 | (Uruguay) Nacional | 1–1 | Estadio Centenario, Montevideo, Uruguay |
| 1984 | 2nd group stage | Match 2 | (Chile) Universidad Católica | 0–0 | Estadio San Carlos de Apoquindo, Santiago, Chile |
| 1984 | 2nd group stage | Match 3 | (Chile) Universidad Católica | 2–1 | La Doble Visera, Avellaneda, Argentina |
| 1984 | 2nd group stage | Match 4 | (Uruguay) Nacional | 1–0 | La Doble Visera, Avellaneda, Argentina |
| 1984 | Final | 1st Leg | (Brazil) Grêmio | 1–0 | Estádio Olímpico, Porto Alegre, Brazil |
| 1984 | Final | 2nd Leg | (Brazil) Grêmio | 0–0 | La Doble Visera, Avellaneda, Argentina |
| 1985 | 2st group stage | Match 1 | (Argentina) Argentinos Juniors | 2–2 | Estadio de la AAAJ, Buenos Aires, Argentina |
| 1985 | 2st group stage | Match 2 | (Bolivia) Blooming | 1–1 | Estadio Ramón Aguilera, Santa Cruz de la Sierra, Bolivia |
| 1985 | 2st group stage | Match 3 | (Bolivia) Blooming | 1–0 | La Doble Visera, Avellaneda, Argentina |
| 1985 | 2st group stage | Match 4 | (Argentina) Argentinos Juniors | 1–2 | La Doble Visera, Avellaneda, Argentina |
| 1987 | 1st group stage | Match 1 | (Venezuela) Deportivo Táchira | 2–3 | Estadio Polideportivo de Pueblo Nuevo, Táchira, Venezuela |
| 1987 | 1st group stage | Match 2 | (Venezuela) Estudiantes de Mérida | 1–0 | Estadio Guillermo Soto Rosa, Mérida, Venezuela |
| 1987 | 1st group stage | Match 3 | (Argentina) Rosario Central | 0–0 | Estadio Gigante de Arroyito, Rosario, Argentina |
| 1987 | 1st group stage | Match 4 | (Venezuela) Estudiantes de Mérida | 2–0 | La Doble Visera, Avellaneda, Argentina |
| 1987 | 1st group stage | Match 5 | (Venezuela) Deportivo Táchira | 5–0 | La Doble Visera, Avellaneda, Argentina |
| 1987 | 1st group stage | Match 6 | (Argentina) Rosario Central | 3–1 | La Doble Visera, Avellaneda, Argentina |
| 1987 | 2nd group stage | Match 1 | (Argentina) River Plate | 0–0 | El Monumental, Buenos Aires, Argentina |
| 1987 | 2nd group stage | Match 2 | (Uruguay) Peñarol | 0–3 | Estadio Centenario, Montevideo, Uruguay |
| 1987 | 2nd group stage | Match 3 | (Argentina) River Plate | 2–1 | La Doble Visera, Avellaneda, Argentina |
| 1987 | 2nd group stage | Match 4 | (Uruguay) Peñarol | 2–4 | La Doble Visera, Avellaneda, Argentina |
| 1990 | Group stage | Match 1 | (Argentina) River Plate | 1–0 | El Monumental, Buenos Aires, Argentina |
| 1990 | Group stage | Match 2 | (Argentina) River Plate | 0–0 | La Doble Visera, Avellaneda, Argentina |
| 1990 | Round of 16 | 1st leg | (Venezuela) Pepeganga Margarita | 6–0 | Estadio Polideportivo de Pueblo Nuevo, Táchira, Venezuela |
| 1990 | Round of 16 | 2nd leg | (Venezuela) Pepeganga Margarita | 3–0 | La Doble Visera, Avellaneda, Argentina |
| 1990 | Quarter-finals | 1st leg | (Argentina) River Plate | 0–2 | El Monumental, Buenos Aires, Argentina |
| 1990 | Quarter-finals | 2nd leg | (Argentina) River Plate | 1–1 | La Doble Visera, Avellaneda, Argentina |
| 1995 | Group stage | Match 1 | (Argentina) River Plate | 1–1 | La Doble Visera, Avellaneda, Argentina |
| 1995 | Group stage | Match 2 | (Uruguay) Peñarol | 2–1 | Estadio Centenario, Montevideo, Uruguay |
| 1995 | Group stage | Match 3 | (Uruguay) Cerro | 0–1 | Estadio Luis Tróccoli, Montevideo, Uruguay |
| 1995 | Group stage | Match 4 | (Argentina) River Plate | 0–2 | El Monumental, Buenos Aires, Argentina |
| 1995 | Group stage | Match 5 | (Uruguay) Peñarol | 0–1 | La Doble Visera, Avellaneda, Argentina |
| 1995 | Group stage | Match 6 | (Uruguay) Cerro | 2–1 | La Doble Visera, Avellaneda, Argentina |
| 1995 | Round of 16 | 1st leg | (Argentina) Vélez Sarsfield | 0–3 | La Doble Visera, Avellaneda, Argentina |
| 1995 | Round of 16 | 2nd leg | (Argentina) Vélez Sarsfield | 2–2 | Estadio José Amalfitani, Buenos Aires, Argentina |
| 2004 | Group stage | Match 1 | (Peru) Cienciano | 4–2 | La Doble Visera, Avellaneda, Argentina |
| 2004 | Group stage | Match 2 | (Uruguay) Nacional | 0–0 | Estadio Centenario, Montevideo, Uruguay |
| 2004 | Group stage | Match 3 | (Ecuador) El Nacional | 2–0 | La Doble Visera, Avellaneda, Argentina |
| 2004 | Group stage | Match 4 | (Ecuador) El Nacional | 0–1 | Estadio Olímpico Atahualpa, Quito, Ecuador |
| 2004 | Group stage | Match 5 | (Uruguay) Nacional | 1–1 | La Doble Visera, Avellaneda, Argentina |
| 2004 | Group stage | Match 6 | (Peru) Cienciano | 2–3 | Estadio de la UNSA, Arequipa, Peru |
| 2004 | Repechage | Single | (Brazil) São Caetano | 2–2 (2–4 P) | Estádio Anacleto Campanella, São Caetano do Sul, Brazil |
| 2011 | First stage | 1st leg | (Ecuador) Deportivo Quito | 2–0 | Estadio Libertadores de América, Avellaneda, Argentina |
| 2011 | First stage | 2nd leg | (Ecuador) Deportivo Quito | 0–1 | Estadio Olímpico Atahualpa, Quito, Ecuador |
| 2011 | Group stage | Match 1 | (Uruguay) Peñarol | 3–0 | Estadio Libertadores de América, Avellaneda, Argentina |
| 2011 | Group stage | Match 2 | (Ecuador) Liga de Quito | 0–3 | Estadio Casa Blanca, Quito, Ecuador |
| 2011 | Group stage | Match 3 | (Argentina) Godoy Cruz | 1–3 | Estadio Libertadores de América, Avellaneda, Argentina |
| 2011 | Group stage | Match 4 | (Argentina) Godoy Cruz | 1–1 | Estadio Malvinas Argentinas, Mendoza, Argentina |
| 2011 | Group stage | Match 5 | (Ecuador) Liga de Quito | 1–1 | Estadio Libertadores de América, Avellaneda, Argentina |
| 2011 | Group stage | Match 6 | (Uruguay) Peñarol | 1–0 | Estadio Centenario, Montevideo, Uruguay |
| 2018 | Group stage | Match 1 | (Venezuela) Deportivo Lara | 0–1 | Estadio Metropolitano, Cabudare, Venezuela |
| 2018 | Group stage | Match 2 | (Colombia) Millonarios | 1–0 | Estadio Libertadores de América, Avellaneda, Argentina |
| 2018 | Group stage | Match 3 | (Brazil) Corinthians | 0–1 | Estadio Libertadores de América, Avellaneda, Argentina |
| 2018 | Group stage | Match 4 | (Brazil) Corinthians | 2–1 | Arena Corinthians, São Paulo, Brazil |
| 2018 | Group stage | Match 5 | (Colombia) Millonarios | 1–1 | Estadio El Campín, Bogotá, Colombia |
| 2018 | Group stage | Match 6 | (Venezuela) Deportivo Lara | 2–0 | Estadio Libertadores de América, Avellaneda, Argentina |
| 2018 | Round of 16 | 1st leg | (Brazil) Santos | 3–0 | Estadio Libertadores de América, Avellaneda, Argentina |
| 2018 | Round of 16 | 2nd leg | (Brazil) Santos | 0–0 | Estádio do Pacaembu, São Paulo, Brazil |
| 2018 | Quarter-finals | 1st leg | (Argentina) River Plate | 0–0 | Estadio Libertadores de América, Avellaneda, Argentina |
| 2018 | Quarter-finals | 2nd leg | (Argentina) River Plate | 1–3 | El Monumental, Buenos Aires, Argentina |

== Copa Interamericana ==
Independiente is the most successful team in the competition, with 3 titles out of 3 appearances.

A combination of factors such as the lack of financial incentives, large trip costs and lack of proper organizing, led the Copa Interamericana to face irregular scheduling and different formats. For instance, Independiente did not contest the 1973 edition, since the 1973 CONCACAF Champions' Cup was practically abandoned and, in all three editions disputed by the red team, they weren't able to host a match in Argentina when being the "home" team.

| Year | Match | Opponent | Score | Venue |
|---|---|---|---|---|
| 1972 | 1st Leg | (Honduras) Olimpia | 2–1 | Estadio General Francisco Morazán, San Pedro Sula, Honduras |
| 1972 | 2nd Leg | (Honduras) Olimpia | 2–0 | Estadio Tiburcio Carías Andino, Tegucigalpa, Honduras |
| 1974 | 1st Leg | (Guatemala) Municipal | 1–0 | Estadio Doroteo Guamuch Flores, Guatemala City, Guatemala |
| 1974 | 2nd Leg | (Guatemala) Municipal | 0–1 (aet, 4–2 P) | Estadio Doroteo Guamuch Flores, Guatemala City, Guatemala |
| 1975 | 1st Leg | (Mexico) Atlético Español | 2–2 | Estadio Olímpico de la UCV, Caracas, Venezuela |
| 1975 | 2nd Leg | (Mexico) Atlético Español | 0–0 (aet, 4–2 P) | Estadio Olímpico de la UCV, Caracas, Venezuela |

== Lunar New Year Cup ==
Invitation to this HKFA-organized competition was earned by virtue of being the most recent Intercontinental Cup champions.

| Year | Match | Opponent | Score | Venue |
|---|---|---|---|---|
| 1975 | Match 1 | Hong Kong | 0–0 | Government Stadium, So Kon Po, Hong Kong |
| 1975 | Match 2 | Hong Kong League XI | 2–1 | Government Stadium, So Kon Po, Hong Kong |

== Supercopa Libertadores ==
Independiente is the most successful team in the competition, together with Cruzeiro, due to them being the only ones to win it twice.

With the obtention of those two titles, Independiente qualified to three other official competitions related to the Supercopa; the 1995 Copa Master de Supercopa, the 1995 Copa de Oro and the 1996 Copa de Oro, but Independiente declined participation in all of them.

The 1992 Supercopa Libertadores round of 16 featured the only Avellaneda derby played at international stage; it was won by Racing by a global 2–1.

| Year | Stage | Match | Opponent | Score | Venue |
|---|---|---|---|---|---|
| 1988 | Round of 16 | 1st Leg | (Brazil) Cruzeiro | 1–2 | La Doble Visera, Avellaneda, Argentina |
| 1988 | Round of 16 | 2nd Leg | (Brazil) Cruzeiro | 0–1 | Mineirão, Belo Horizonte, Brazil |
| 1989 | Round of 16 | 1st Leg | (Brazil) Santos | 2–1 | Estádio Urbano Caldeira, Santos, Brazil |
| 1989 | Round of 16 | 2nd Leg | (Brazil) Santos | 2–0 | La Doble Visera, Avellaneda, Argentina |
| 1989 | Quarter-finals | 1st Leg | (Colombia) Atlético Nacional | 2–2 | Estadio Atanasio Girardot, Medellín, Colombia |
| 1989 | Quarter-finals | 2nd Leg | (Colombia) Atlético Nacional | 2–0 | La Doble Visera, Avellaneda, Argentina |
| 1989 | Semi-finals | 1st Leg | (Argentina) Argentinos Juniors | 1–0 | Estadio José Amalfitani, Buenos Aires, Argentina |
| 1989 | Semi-finals | 2nd Leg | (Argentina) Argentinos Juniors | 2–1 | La Doble Visera, Avellaneda, Argentina |
| 1989 | Final | 1st Leg | (Argentina) Boca Juniors | 0–0 | La Bombonera, Buenos Aires, Argentina |
| 1989 | Final | 2nd Leg | (Argentina) Boca Juniors | 0–0 (3–5 P) | La Doble Visera, Avellaneda, Argentina |
| 1990 | Round of 16 | 1st Leg | (Uruguay) Nacional | 1–1 | La Doble Visera, Avellaneda, Argentina |
| 1990 | Round of 16 | 2nd Leg | (Uruguay) Nacional | 1–2 | Estadio Centenario, Montevideo, Uruguay |
| 1991 | Quarter-finals | 1st Leg | (Paraguay) Olimpia | 1–1 | La Doble Visera, Avellaneda, Argentina |
| 1991 | Quarter-finals | 2nd Leg | (Paraguay) Olimpia | 0–2 | Estadio Manuel Ferreira, Asunción, Paraguay |
| 1992 | Round of 16 | 1st Leg | (Argentina) Racing | 1–2 | El Cilindro, Avellaneda, Argentina |
| 1992 | Round of 16 | 2nd Leg | (Argentina) Racing | 0–0 | La Doble Visera, Avellaneda, Argentina |
| 1993 | Round of 16 | 1st Leg | (Brazil) São Paulo | 0–2 | Estádio do Morumbi, São Paulo, Brazil |
| 1993 | Round of 16 | 2nd Leg | (Brazil) São Paulo | 1–1 | La Doble Visera, Avellaneda, Argentina |
| 1994 | Round of 16 | 1st Leg | (Brazil) Santos | 0–1 | Estádio Urbano Caldeira, Santos, Brazil |
| 1994 | Round of 16 | 2nd Leg | (Brazil) Santos | 4–0 | La Doble Visera, Avellaneda, Argentina |
| 1994 | Quarter-finals | 1st Leg | (Brazil) Grêmio | 1–1 | Estádio Olímpico, Porto Alegre, Brazil |
| 1994 | Quarter-finals | 2nd Leg | (Brazil) Grêmio | 2–0 | La Doble Visera, Avellaneda, Argentina |
| 1994 | Semi-finals | 1st Leg | (Brazil) Cruzeiro | 0–1 | Mineirão, Belo Horizonte, Brazil |
| 1994 | Semi-finals | 2nd Leg | (Brazil) Cruzeiro | 4–0 | La Doble Visera, Avellaneda, Argentina |
| 1994 | Final | 1st Leg | (Argentina) Boca Juniors | 1–1 | La Bombonera, Buenos Aires, Argentina |
| 1994 | Final | 2nd Leg | (Argentina) Boca Juniors | 1–0 | La Doble Visera, Avellaneda, Argentina |
| 1995 | Round of 16 | 1st Leg | (Brazil) Santos | 1–1 | La Doble Visera, Avellaneda, Argentina |
| 1995 | Round of 16 | 2nd Leg | (Brazil) Santos | 2–2 (3–2 P) | Estádio Urbano Caldeira, Santos, Brazil |
| 1995 | Quarter-finals | 1st Leg | (Colombia) Atlético Nacional | 0–1 | Estadio Atanasio Girardot, Medellín, Colombia |
| 1995 | Quarter-finals | 2nd Leg | (Colombia) Atlético Nacional | 2–0 | La Doble Visera, Avellaneda, Argentina |
| 1995 | Semi-finals | 1st Leg | (Argentina) River Plate | 2–2 | La Doble Visera, Avellaneda, Argentina |
| 1995 | Semi-finals | 2nd Leg | (Argentina) River Plate | 0–0 (4–1 P) | El Monumental, Buenos Aires, Argentina |
| 1995 | Final | 1st Leg | (Brazil) Flamengo | 2–0 | La Doble Visera, Avellaneda, Argentina |
| 1995 | Final | 2nd Leg | (Brazil) Flamengo | 0–1 | Estádio do Maracanã, Rio de Janeiro, Brazil |
| 1996 | Round of 16 | 1st Leg | (Brazil) Flamengo | 0–0 | La Doble Visera, Avellaneda, Argentina |
| 1996 | Round of 16 | 2nd Leg | (Brazil) Flamengo | 0–1 | Estádio do Maracanã, Rio de Janeiro, Brazil |
| 1997 | Group stage | Match 1 | (Argentina) Boca Juniors | 1–1 | La Bombonera, Buenos Aires, Argentina |
| 1997 | Group stage | Match 2 | (Chile) Colo-Colo | 0–2 | Estadio Nacional, Santiago, Chile |
| 1997 | Group stage | Match 3 | (Brazil) Cruzeiro | 1–2 | Mineirão, Belo Horizonte, Brazil |
| 1997 | Group stage | Match 4 | (Argentina) Boca Juniors | 2–1 | La Doble Visera, Avellaneda, Argentina |
| 1997 | Group stage | Match 5 | (Chile) Colo-Colo | 2–2 | La Doble Visera, Avellaneda, Argentina |
| 1997 | Group stage | Match 6 | (Brazil) Cruzeiro | 3–1 | La Doble Visera, Avellaneda, Argentina |

== Copa Mercosur ==
This is the only official CONMEBOL competition never won by Independiente among those which the team took participation. The best place reached by the team were the quarterfinals, in 1999 and 2001.

| Year | Stage | Match | Opponent | Score | Venue |
|---|---|---|---|---|---|
| 1998 | Group stage | Match 1 | (Brazil) Palmeiras | 1–2 | Estádio Palestra Itália, São Paulo, Brazil |
| 1998 | Group stage | Match 2 | Universidad de Chile | 0–3 | Estadio Nacional, Santiago, Chile |
| 1998 | Group stage | Match 3 | (Uruguay) Nacional | 4–3 | La Doble Visera, Avellaneda, Argentina |
| 1998 | Group stage | Match 4 | (Brazil) Palmeiras | 0–3 | La Doble Visera, Avellaneda, Argentina |
| 1998 | Group stage | Match 5 | Universidad de Chile | 6–2 | La Doble Visera, Avellaneda, Argentina |
| 1998 | Group stage | Match 6 | (Uruguay) Nacional | 1–2 | Estadio Centenario, Montevideo, Uruguay |
| 1999 | Group stage | Match 1 | (Brazil) Corinthians | 2–1 | Estádio do Pacaembu, São Paulo, Brazil |
| 1999 | Group stage | Match 2 | (Argentina) Vélez Sarsfield | 1–1 | La Doble Visera, Avellaneda, Argentina |
| 1999 | Group stage | Match 3 | (Brazil) Grêmio | 0–2 | Estádio Olímpico, Porto Alegre, Brazil |
| 1999 | Group stage | Match 4 | (Argentina) Vélez Sarsfield | 1–1 | Estadio José Amalfitani, Buenos Aires, Argentina |
| 1999 | Group stage | Match 5 | (Brazil) Corinthians | 2–0 | La Doble Visera, Avellaneda, Argentina |
| 1999 | Group stage | Match 6 | (Brazil) Grêmio | 1–0 | La Doble Visera, Avellaneda, Argentina |
| 1999 | Quarter-finals | 1st Leg | (Brazil) Flamengo | 1–1 | La Doble Visera, Avellaneda, Argentina |
| 1999 | Quarter-finals | 2nd Leg | (Brazil) Flamengo | 0–4 | Estádio do Maracanã, Rio de Janeiro, Brazil |
| 2000 | Group stage | Match 1 | (Brazil) Cruzeiro | 0–3 | Mineirão, Belo Horizonte, Brazil |
| 2000 | Group stage | Match 2 | (Brazil) Palmeiras | 1–2 | La Doble Visera, Avellaneda, Argentina |
| 2000 | Group stage | Match 3 | (Chile) Universidad Católica | 3–0 | La Doble Visera, Avellaneda, Argentina |
| 2000 | Group stage | Match 4 | (Brazil) Cruzeiro | 2–0 | La Doble Visera, Avellaneda, Argentina |
| 2000 | Group stage | Match 5 | (Brazil) Palmeiras | 0–2 | Estádio Palestra Itália, São Paulo, Brazil |
| 2000 | Group stage | Match 6 | (Chile) Universidad Católica | 3–3 | Estadio San Carlos de Apoquindo, Santiago, Chile |
| 2001 | Group stage | Match 1 | (Brazil) Cruzeiro | 2–0 | La Doble Visera, Avellaneda, Argentina |
| 2001 | Group stage | Match 2 | (Brazil) Corinthians | 1–2 | Estádio do Pacaembu, São Paulo, Brazil |
| 2001 | Group stage | Match 3 | (Chile) Colo-Colo | 1–2 | Estadio Nacional, Santiago, Chile |
| 2001 | Group stage | Match 4 | (Brazil) Cruzeiro | 1–4 | Mineirão, Belo Horizonte, Brazil |
| 2001 | Group stage | Match 5 | (Brazil) Corinthians | 1–0 | La Doble Visera, Avellaneda, Argentina |
| 2001 | Group stage | Match 6 | (Chile) Colo-Colo | 2–0 | La Doble Visera, Avellaneda, Argentina |
| 2001 | Quarter-finals | 1st Leg | (Brazil) Flamengo | 0–0 | La Doble Visera, Avellaneda, Argentina |
| 2001 | Quarter-finals | 2nd Leg | (Brazil) Flamengo | 0–4 | Estádio do Maracanã, Rio de Janeiro, Brazil |

== Recopa Sudamericana ==
Independiente managed to win only one title out of 4 appearances at this Super Cup competition. All qualifications to the Recopa were achieved as champions of the second-most prestigious competition at the time, either Supercopa or Copa Sudamericana.

The 1995 final with Vélez Sarsfield was, to date, the only game played against a fellow Argentine team in a foreign country.

| Year | Match | Opponent | Score | Venue |
|---|---|---|---|---|
| 1995 | Single | (Argentina) Vélez Sarsfield | 1–0 | National Stadium, Tokyo, Japan |
| 1996 | Single | (Brazil) Grêmio | 1–4 | Kobe Universiade Memorial Stadium, Kobe, Japan |
| 2011 | 1st Leg | (Brazil) Internacional | 2–1 | Estadio Libertadores de América, Avellaneda, Argentina |
| 2011 | 2nd Leg | (Brazil) Internacional | 1–3 | Estádio Beira-Rio, Porto Alegre, Brazil |
| 2018 | 1st Leg | (Brazil) Grêmio | 1–1 | Estadio Libertadores de América, Avellaneda, Argentina |
| 2018 | 2nd Leg | (Brazil) Grêmio | 0–0 (aet, 4–5 P) | Arena do Grêmio, Porto Alegre, Brazil |

== Copa Sudamericana ==
Independiente, Boca Juniors, Athletico Paranaense, Independiente del Valle and L.D.U. Quito are the most successful teams, with two titles for each team. In addition to this, Independiente is placed first in the all-time table of the competition.

| Year | Stage | Match | Opponent | Score | Venue |
|---|---|---|---|---|---|
| 2003 | Second stage | 1st leg | (Argentina) Rosario Central | 1–1 | La Doble Visera, Avellaneda, Argentina |
| 2003 | Second stage | 2nd leg | (Argentina) Rosario Central | 1–0 | Estadio Gigante de Arroyito, Rosario, Argentina |
| 2003 | Round of 16 | 1st Leg | (Argentina) River Plate | 1–4 | La Doble Visera, Avellaneda, Argentina |
| 2003 | Round of 16 | 2nd Leg | (Argentina) River Plate | 0–4 | El Monumental, Buenos Aires, Argentina |
| 2008 | Second stage | 1st leg | (Argentina) Estudiantes | 2–1 | El Cilindro, Avellaneda, Argentina |
| 2008 | Second stage | 2nd leg | (Argentina) Estudiantes | 1–2 (3–5 P) | Estadio Ciudad de La Plata, La Plata, Argentina |
| 2010 | Second stage | 1st leg | (Argentina) Argentinos Juniors | 1–0 | Estadio Libertadores de América, Avellaneda, Argentina |
| 2010 | Second stage | 2nd leg | (Argentina) Argentinos Juniors | 1–1 | Estadio Diego Armando Maradona, Buenos Aires, Argentina |
| 2010 | Round of 16 | 1st leg | (Uruguay) Defensor Sporting | 0–1 | Estadio Centenario, Montevideo, Uruguay |
| 2010 | Round of 16 | 2nd leg | (Uruguay) Defensor Sporting | 4–2 | Estadio Libertadores de América, Avellaneda, Argentina |
| 2010 | Quarter-finals | 1st leg | (Colombia) Deportes Tolima | 2–2 | Estadio Manuel Murillo Toro, Ibagué, Colombia |
| 2010 | Quarter-finals | 2nd leg | (Colombia) Deportes Tolima | 1–1 | El Cilindro, Avellaneda, Argentina |
| 2010 | Semi-finals | 1st leg | (Ecuador) Liga de Quito | 2–3 | Estadio Casa Blanca, Quito, Ecuador |
| 2010 | Semi-finals | 2nd leg | (Ecuador) Liga de Quito | 2–1 | Estadio Libertadores de América, Avellaneda, Argentina |
| 2010 | Final | 1st leg | (Brazil) Goiás | 0–2 | Estádio Serra Dourada, Goiânia, Brazil |
| 2010 | Final | 2nd leg | (Brazil) Goiás | 3–1 (aet, 5–3 P) | Estadio Libertadores de América, Avellaneda, Argentina |
| 2011 | Round of 16 | 1st leg | (Ecuador) Liga de Quito | 0–2 | Estadio Casa Blanca, Quito, Ecuador |
| 2011 | Round of 16 | 2nd leg | (Ecuador) Liga de Quito | 1–0 | Estadio Libertadores de América, Avellaneda, Argentina |
| 2012 | Second stage | 1st leg | (Argentina) Boca Juniors | 3–3 | La Bombonera, Buenos Aires, Argentina |
| 2012 | Second stage | 2nd leg | (Argentina) Boca Juniors | 0–0 | Estadio Libertadores de América, Avellaneda, Argentina |
| 2012 | Round of 16 | 1st Leg | (Uruguay) Liverpool | 2–1 | Estadio Libertadores de América, Avellaneda, Argentina |
| 2012 | Round of 16 | 2nd Leg | (Uruguay) Liverpool | 2–1 | Estadio Centenario, Montevideo, Uruguay |
| 2012 | Quarter-finals | 1st Leg | (Chile) Universidad Católica | 2–2 | Estadio Libertadores de América, Avellaneda, Argentina |
| 2012 | Quarter-finals | 2nd Leg | (Chile) Universidad Católica | 1–2 | Estadio San Carlos de Apoquindo, Santiago, Chile |
| 2015 | Second stage | 1st leg | (Argentina) Arsenal | 1–1 | Estadio Julio Humberto Grondona, Sarandí, Argentina |
| 2015 | Second stage | 2nd leg | (Argentina) Arsenal | 1–0 | Estadio Libertadores de América, Avellaneda, Argentina |
| 2015 | Round of 16 | 1st Leg | (Paraguay) Olimpia | 1–0 | Estadio Libertadores de América, Avellaneda, Argentina |
| 2015 | Round of 16 | 2nd Leg | (Paraguay) Olimpia | 0–0 | Estadio Defensores del Chaco, Asunción, Paraguay |
| 2015 | Quarter-finals | 1st Leg | (Colombia) Santa Fe | 0–1 | Estadio Libertadores de América, Avellaneda, Argentina |
| 2015 | Quarter-finals | 2nd Leg | (Colombia) Santa Fe | 1–1 | Estadio El Campín, Bogotá, Colombia |
| 2016 | Second stage | 1st leg | (Argentina) Lanús | 2–0 | Estadio Ciudad de Lanús, Lanús, Argentina |
| 2016 | Second stage | 2nd leg | (Argentina) Lanús | 1–0 | Estadio Libertadores de América, Avellaneda, Argentina |
| 2016 | Round of 16 | 1st Leg | (Brazil) Chapecoense | 0–0 | Estadio Libertadores de América, Avellaneda, Argentina |
| 2016 | Round of 16 | 2nd Leg | (Brazil) Chapecoense | 0–0 (4–5 P) | Arena Condá, Chapecó, Brazil |
| 2017 | First stage | 1st leg | (Peru) Alianza Lima | 0–0 | Estadio Libertadores de América, Avellaneda, Argentina |
| 2017 | First stage | 2nd leg | (Peru) Alianza Lima | 1–0 | Estadio Alejandro Villanueva, Lima, Peru |
| 2017 | Second stage | 1st leg | (Chile) Deportes Iquique | 4–2 | Estadio Libertadores de América, Avellaneda, Argentina |
| 2017 | Second stage | 2nd leg | (Chile) Deportes Iquique | 2–1 | Estadio Zorros del Desierto, Calama, Chile |
| 2017 | Round of 16 | 1st leg | (Argentina) Atlético Tucumán | 0–1 | Estadio Monumental José Fierro, Tucumán, Argentina |
| 2017 | Round of 16 | 2nd leg | (Argentina) Atlético Tucumán | 2–0 | Estadio Libertadores de América, Avellaneda, Argentina |
| 2017 | Quarter-finals | 1st leg | (Paraguay) Nacional | 4–1 | Estadio Defensores del Chaco, Asunción, Paraguay |
| 2017 | Quarter-finals | 2nd leg | (Paraguay) Nacional | 2–0 | Estadio Libertadores de América, Avellaneda, Argentina |
| 2017 | Semi-finals | 1st leg | (Paraguay) Libertad | 0–1 | Estadio Defensores del Chaco, Asunción, Paraguay |
| 2017 | Semi-finals | 2nd leg | (Paraguay) Libertad | 3–1 | Estadio Libertadores de América, Avellaneda, Argentina |
| 2017 | Final | 1st leg | (Brazil) Flamengo | 2–1 | Estadio Libertadores de América, Avellaneda, Argentina |
| 2017 | Final | 2nd leg | (Brazil) Flamengo | 1–1 | Estádio do Maracanã, Rio de Janeiro, Brazil |
| 2019 | First stage | 1st leg | (Peru) Binacional | 4–1 | Estadio Libertadores de América, Avellaneda, Argentina |
| 2019 | First stage | 2nd leg | (Peru) Binacional | 2–1 | Estadio de la UNSA, Arequipa, Peru |
| 2019 | Second stage | 1st leg | (Colombia) Rionegro Águilas | 2–3 | Estadio Alberto Grisales, Rionegro, Colombia |
| 2019 | Second stage | 2nd leg | (Colombia) Rionegro Águilas | 2–0 | Estadio Libertadores de América, Avellaneda, Argentina |
| 2019 | Round of 16 | 1st leg | (Ecuador) Universidad Católica | 1–0 | Estadio Libertadores de América, Avellaneda, Argentina |
| 2019 | Round of 16 | 2nd leg | (Ecuador) Universidad Católica | 2–3 | Estadio Olímpico Atahualpa, Quito, Ecuador |
| 2019 | Quarter-finals | 1st leg | (Ecuador) Independiente del Valle | 2–1 | Estadio Libertadores de América, Avellaneda, Argentina |
| 2019 | Quarter-finals | 2nd leg | (Ecuador) Independiente del Valle | 0–1 | Estadio Olímpico Atahualpa, Quito, Ecuador |
| 2020 | First stage | 1st leg | (Brazil) Fortaleza | 1–0 | Estadio Libertadores de América, Avellaneda, Argentina |
| 2020 | First stage | 2nd leg | (Brazil) Fortaleza | 1–2 | Castelão, Fortaleza, Brazil |
| 2020 | Second stage | 1st leg | (Argentina) Atlético Tucumán | 1–0 | Estadio Libertadores de América, Avellaneda, Argentina |
| 2020 | Second stage | 2nd leg | (Argentina) Atlético Tucumán | 1–1 | Estadio Monumental José Fierro, Tucumán, Argentina |
| 2020 | Round of 16 | 1st leg | (Uruguay) Fénix | 4–1 | Parque Viera, Montevideo, Uruguay |
| 2020 | Round of 16 | 2nd leg | (Uruguay) Fénix | 1–0 | Estadio Libertadores de América, Avellaneda, Argentina |
| 2020 | Quarter-finals | 1st leg | (Argentina) Lanús | 0–0 | Estadio Ciudad de Lanús, Lanús, Argentina |
| 2020 | Quarter-finals | 2nd leg | (Argentina) Lanús | 1–3 | Estadio Libertadores de América, Avellaneda, Argentina |
| 2021 | Group stage | | | | |
| 2021 | Group stage | Match 1 | (Bolivia) Guabirá | 3–1 | Estadio Gilberto Parada, Montero, Bolivia |
| 2021 | Group stage | Match 2 | (Uruguay) Montevideo City Torque | 3–1 | Estadio Libertadores de América, Avellaneda, Argentina |
| 2021 | Group stage | Match 3 | (Brazil) Bahia | 2–2 | Estádio de Pituaçu, Salvador, Brazil |
| 2021 | Group stage | Match 4 | (Uruguay) Montevideo City Torque | 1–1 | Parque Viera, Montevideo, Uruguay |
| 2021 | Group stage | Match 5 | (Brazil) Bahia | 1–0 | Estadio Libertadores de América, Avellaneda, Argentina |
| 2021 | Group stage | Match 6 | (Bolivia) Guabirá | 1–0 | Estadio Libertadores de América, Avellaneda, Argentina |
| 2021 | Round of 16 | 1st leg | (Brazil) Santos | 0–1 | Estádio Urbano Caldeira, Santos, Brazil |
| 2021 | Round of 16 | 2nd leg | (Brazil) Santos | 1–1 | Estadio Libertadores de América, Avellaneda, Argentina |
| 2022 | Group stage | | | | |
| 2022 | Group stage | Match 1 | (Brazil) Ceará | 1–2 | Castelão, Fortaleza, Brazil |
| 2022 | Group stage | Match 2 | (Paraguay) General Caballero | 2–0 | Estadio Libertadores de América, Avellaneda, Argentina |
| 2022 | Group stage | Match 3 | (Venezuela) Deportivo La Guaira | 2–0 | Estadio Olímpico de la UCV, Caracas, Venezuela |
| 2022 | Group stage | Match 4 | (Paraguay) General Caballero | 4–0 | Estadio Manuel Ferreira, Asunción, Paraguay |
| 2022 | Group stage | Match 5 | (Venezuela) Deportivo La Guaira | 4–0 | Estadio Libertadores de América, Avellaneda, Argentina |
| 2022 | Group stage | Match 6 | (Brazil) Ceará | 0–2 | Estadio Libertadores de América, Avellaneda, Argentina |
| 2025 | Group stage | | | | |
| 2025 | Group stage | Match 1 | (Bolivia) Nacional Potosí | | |
| 2025 | Group stage | Match 2 | (Uruguay) Boston River | | Estadio Libertadores de América, Avellaneda, Argentina |
| 2025 | Group stage | Match 3 | (Paraguay) Guaraní | | |
| 2025 | Group stage | Match 4 | (Uruguay) Boston River | | |
| 2025 | Group stage | Match 5 | (Paraguay) Guaraní | | Estadio Libertadores de América, Avellaneda, Argentina |
| 2025 | Group stage | Match 6 | (Bolivia) Nacional Potosí | | Estadio Libertadores de América, Avellaneda, Argentina |

== Suruga Bank Championship ==
Independiente leads the competition's all-time table, above Kashima Antlers for a better goal difference.

| Year | Opponent | Score | Venue |
|---|---|---|---|
| 2011 | (Japan) Júbilo Iwata | 2–2 (2–4 P) | Shizuoka Stadium, Fukuroi, Japan |
| 2018 | (Japan) Cerezo Osaka | 1–0 | Yanmar Stadium Nagai, Osaka, Japan |

== Intercontinental Cup ==
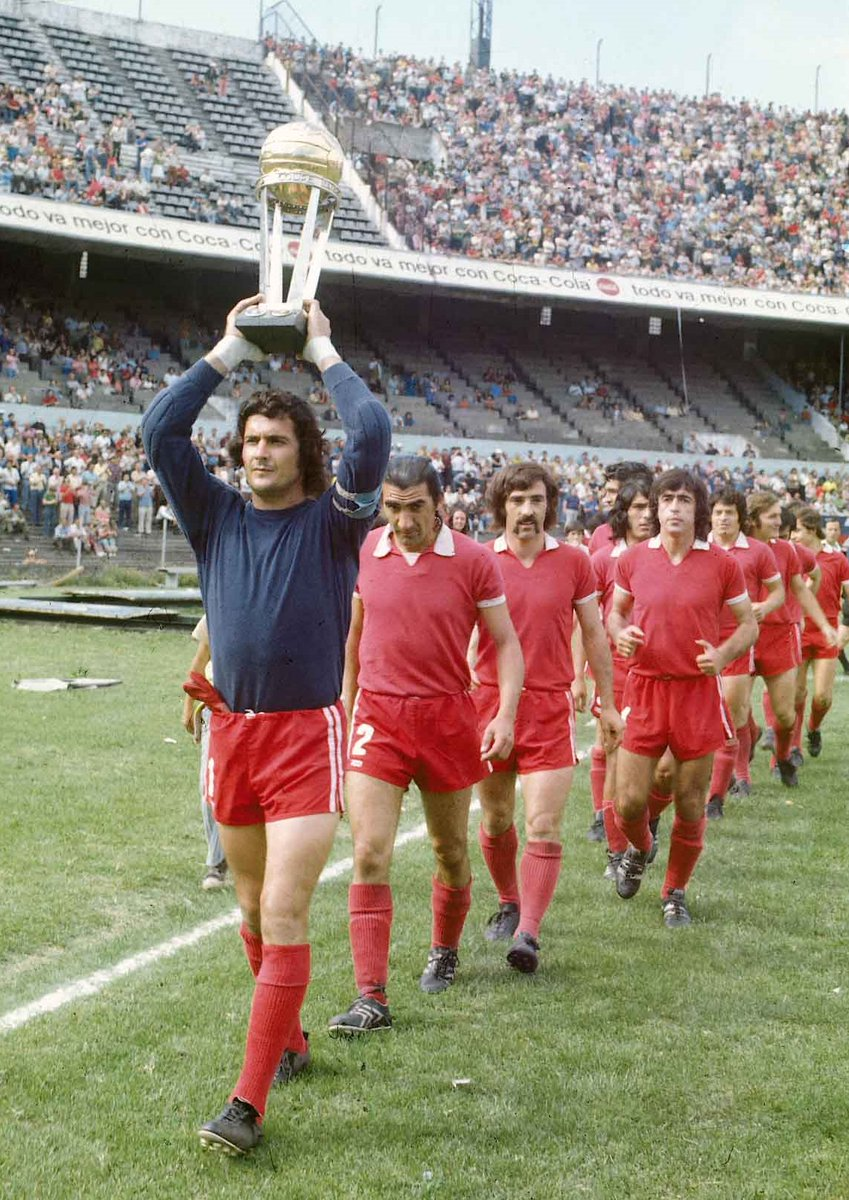
1973 Intercontinental Cup victory in Rome.

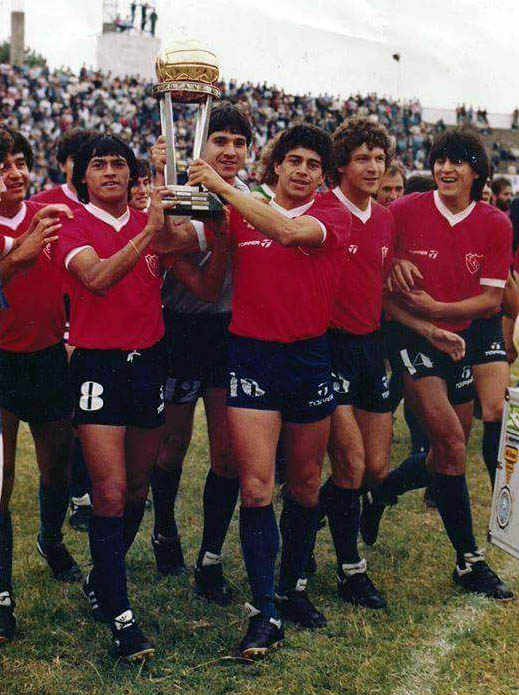
1984 Intercontinental Cup victory in Tokyo.

With victories at the 1973 and 1984 editions, Independiente became a two-time club world champion.

In addition to the following results, Independiente qualified to the 1975 edition, but since the 1974–75 European Cup winners refused to take part and the runners-up were banned from international football, it was never played.

With two championships and other four appearances, Independiente is placed second in the competition's all-time table behind Peñarol.

| Year | Match | Opponent | Score | Venue |
|---|---|---|---|---|
| 1964 | 1st Leg | (Italy) Inter Milan | 1–0 | La Doble Visera, Avellaneda, Argentina |
| 1964 | 2nd Leg | (Italy) Inter Milan | 0–2 | San Siro, Milan, Italy |
| 1964 | Play-off | (Italy) Inter Milan | 0–1 (aet) | Estadio Santiago Bernabéu, Madrid, Spain |
| 1965 | 1st Leg | (Italy) Inter Milan | 0–3 | San Siro, Milan, Italy |
| 1965 | 2nd Leg | (Italy) Inter Milan | 0–0 | La Doble Visera, Avellaneda, Argentina |
| 1972 | 1st Leg | (Netherlands) Ajax | 1–1 | La Doble Visera, Avellaneda, Argentina |
| 1972 | 2nd Leg | (Netherlands) Ajax | 0–3 | Olympic Stadium, Amsterdam, Netherlands |
| 1973 | Single (Note: Match was originally due to be played at a two-legged final, but both teams agreed to play a single match final in the UEFA representative's home stadium.) | (Italy) Juventus | 1–0 | Stadio Olimpico, Rome, Italy |
| 1974 | 1st Leg | (Spain) Atlético Madrid | 1–0 | La Doble Visera, Avellaneda, Argentina |
| 1974 | 2nd Leg | (Spain) Atlético Madrid | 0–2 | Estadio Vicente Calderón, Madrid, Spain |
| 1984 | Single | (England) Liverpool | 1–0 | National Stadium, Tokyo, Japan |

== Overall record ==
| Kind | Competition | Played | Won | Drew | Lost | GF | GA | GD | Points | Titles | App |
|---|---|---|---|---|---|---|---|---|---|---|---|
| Current; CONMEBOL competitions | Copa Libertadores | 155 | 73 | 40 | 42 | 211 | 143 | +68 | 259 | 7 | 20 |
| Current; CONMEBOL competitions | Copa Sudamericana | 76 | 38 | 19 | 19 | 111 | 77 | +34 | 133 | 2^{s} | 11 |
| Current; CONMEBOL competitions | Recopa Sudamericana | 6 | 2 | 2 | 2 | 6 | 9 | −3 | 8 | 1 | 4 |
| Current; CONMEBOL competitions | Suruga Bank Championship | 2 | 1 | 1 | 0 | 3 | 2 | +1 | 4 | 1 | 2 |
| Former; CONMEBOL competitions | Intercontinental Cup | 11 | 4 | 2 | 5 | 5 | 12 | −7 | 14 | 2 | 6 |
| Former; CONMEBOL competitions | Supercopa Sudamericana | 42 | 13 | 16 | 13 | 48 | 39 | +9 | 55 | 2^{s} | 10 |
| Former; CONMEBOL competitions | Copa Interamericana | 6 | 3 | 2 | 1 | 7 | 4 | +3 | 11 | 3 | 3 |
| Former; CONMEBOL competitions | Copa Mercosur | 28 | 10 | 5 | 13 | 37 | 47 | −10 | 35 | 0 | 4 |
| Total | | 326 | 146 | 87 | 95 | 428 | 333 | +95 | 519 | 18 | 59 |
| Non-CONMEBOL competitions | Tie Cup | 1 | 0 | 0 | 1 | 0 | 4 | −4 | 0 | 0 | 1 |
| Non-CONMEBOL competitions | Copa de Honor Cousenier | 1 | 0 | 0 | 1 | 0 | 4 | −4 | 0 | 0 | 1 |
| Non-CONMEBOL competitions | Copa Dr. Ricardo Aldao | 2 | 2 | 0 | 0 | 8 | 1 | +7 | 6 | 2 | 2 |
| Non-CONMEBOL competitions | Lunar New Year Cup | 2 | 1 | 1 | 0 | 2 | 1 | +1 | 4 | 1 | 1 |
| Overall total | | 333 | 147 | 88 | 97 | 438 | 343 | +95 | 529 | 21 | 65 |
As of 2022 Copa Sudamericana

- record
- ^{s} shared record

=== Competitive record ===
Below is a list of all matches Independiente has played against clubs per country association.

| Association | Played | Won | Drew | Lost | %Won | GF | GA | GD | Teams |
|---|---|---|---|---|---|---|---|---|---|
| Argentina | 86 | 26 | 35 | 25 | 30% | 86 | 92 | −6 | 14; Boca Juniors, River Plate, Estudiantes, Rosario Central, San Lorenzo, Huracán, Quilmes, Argentinos Juniors, Racing, Vélez Sarsfield, Godoy Cruz, Arsenal, Lanús, Atlético Tucumán |
| Brazil | 75 | 27 | 17 | 31 | 36% | 81 | 87 | −6 | 14; Palmeiras, Santos, São Paulo, Cruzeiro, Grêmio, Flamengo, Corinthians, São Caetano, Goiás, Internacional, Chapecoense, Fortaleza, Bahia, Ceará |
| Uruguay | 39 | 21 | 8 | 10 | 54% | 59 | 45 | +14 | 8; Montevideo Wanderers, Peñarol, Nacional, Cerro, Defensor Sporting, Liverpool, Fénix, Montevideo City Torque |
| Colombia | 29 | 15 | 8 | 6 | 52% | 49 | 28 | +21 | 6; Millonarios, Deportivo Cali, Atlético Nacional, Santa Fe, Deportes Tolima, Rionegro Águilas |
| Ecuador | 20 | 10 | 2 | 8 | 50% | 23 | 20 | +3 | 6; Barcelona, Liga de Quito, El Nacional, Deportivo Quito, Universidad Católica, Independiente del Valle |
| Chile | 20 | 9 | 6 | 5 | 45% | 36 | 26 | +10 | 4; Colo-Colo, Universidad Católica, Universidad de Chile, Deportes Iquique |
| Paraguay | 16 | 11 | 2 | 3 | 69% | 27 | 10 | +17 | 6; Guaraní, Olimpia, Sportivo Luqueño, Nacional, Libertad, General Caballero |
| Peru | 12 | 8 | 3 | 1 | 67% | 27 | 10 | +17 | 4; Alianza Lima, Universitario, Cienciano, Binacional |
| Venezuela | 10 | 8 | 0 | 2 | 80% | 27 | 4 | +23 | 4; Deportivo Táchira, Estudiantes de Mérida, Pepeganga Margarita, Deportivo Lara, Deportivo La Guaira |
| Italy | 6 | 2 | 1 | 3 | 33% | 2 | 6 | −4 | 2; Inter Milan, Juventus |
| Bolivia | 4 | 3 | 1 | 0 | 75% | 6 | 2 | +4 | 2; Blooming, Guabirá |
| Netherlands | 2 | 0 | 1 | 1 | 0% | 1 | 4 | −3 | 1; Ajax |
| Honduras | 2 | 2 | 0 | 0 | 100% | 4 | 1 | +3 | 1; Olimpia |
| Spain | 2 | 1 | 0 | 1 | 50% | 1 | 2 | −1 | 1; Atlético Madrid |
| Guatemala | 2 | 1 | 0 | 1 | 50% | 1 | 1 | 0 | 1; Municipal |
| Hong Kong | 2 | 1 | 1 | 0 | 50% | 2 | 1 | +1 | 2; Hong Kong, Hong Kong League XI |
| Mexico | 2 | 0 | 2 | 0 | 0% | 2 | 2 | 0 | 1; Atlético Español |
| Japan | 2 | 1 | 1 | 0 | 50% | 3 | 2 | +1 | 2; Júbilo Iwata, Cerezo Osaka |
| England | 1 | 1 | 0 | 0 | 100% | 1 | 0 | +1 | 1; Liverpool |
| Total | 332 | 147 | 88 | 97 | 44% | 437 | 343 | +95 | 80 |

==== Biggest home wins ====
- vs. (Uruguay) Nacional, 5–0 (1939 Copa Aldao)
- vs. (Venezuela) Deportivo Táchira, 5–0 (1987 Copa Libertadores group stage)

==== Biggest away win ====
- vs. (Venezuela) Pepeganga Margarita, 6–0 (1990 Copa Libertadores round of 16)

==== Biggest two leg win ====
- vs. (Venezuela) Pepeganga Margarita, 9–0 (1990 Copa Libertadores round of 16)

==== Biggest home defeat ====
- vs. (Uruguay) Montevideo Wanderers, 0–4 (1917 Tie Cup)

==== Biggest away defeats ====
- vs. (Uruguay) Peñarol, 0–4 (1918 Copa de Honor Cousenier)
- vs. (Brazil) Flamengo, 0–4 (1999 Copa Mercosur quarterfinals)
- vs. (Brazil) Flamengo, 0–4 (2001 Copa Mercosur quarterfinals)
- vs. (Argentina) River Plate, 0–4 (2003 Copa Sudamericana second stage)

==== Biggest two leg defeat ====
- vs. (Argentina) River Plate, 1–8 (2003 Copa Sudamericana second stage)

==== Longest winning run ====
- 4 matches (1964 Copa Libertadores)
- 4 matches (1972 Copa Libertadores)

==== Longest unbeaten run ====
- 13 matches (1984 Copa Libertadores−1985 Copa Libertadores)

==== Longest winless run ====
- 11 matches (1990 Copa Libertadores−1994 Supercopa Sudamericana)

==== Longest losing run ====
- 3 matches (1995 Copa Libertadores)
- 3 matches (2001 Copa Mercosur)

==== Highest scoring game ====
- vs. Universidad de Chile, 6–2 (1998 Copa Mercosur group stage)

==== Highest home attendances ====
- vs. (Uruguay) Nacional, 1–0 (1964 Copa Libertadores Finals, 80,000)
- vs. (Italy) Inter Milan, 0–0 (1965 Intercontinental Cup, 80,000)

==== Highest away attendance ====
- vs. (Brazil) Flamengo, 0–1 (1995 Supercopa Sudamericana Finals, 105,000)

== Honours ==
=== South America ===
- Copa Libertadores (7): 1964, 1965, 1972, 1973, 1974, 1975, 1984 (Note: CONMEBOL competition)(record)
- Copa Sudamericana (2): 2010, 2017 (shared record)
- Recopa Sudamericana (1): 1995
- Supercopa Sudamericana (2): 1994, 1995 (shared record)
- Copa Dr. Ricardo Aldao (2): 1938, 1939 (Note: Organised by the Argentine Football Association and the Uruguayan Football Association together)

=== Worldwide ===
- Intercontinental Cup (2): 1973, 1984 (Note: Organised by UEFA and CONMEBOL together)
- Copa Interamericana (3): 1972, 1974, 1975 (Note: Organised by CONMEBOL and CONCACAF together)(record)
- Suruga Bank Championship (1): 2018 (Note: Organised by CONMEBOL and Japan Football Association together)

== Friendly football ==
=== International tours ===
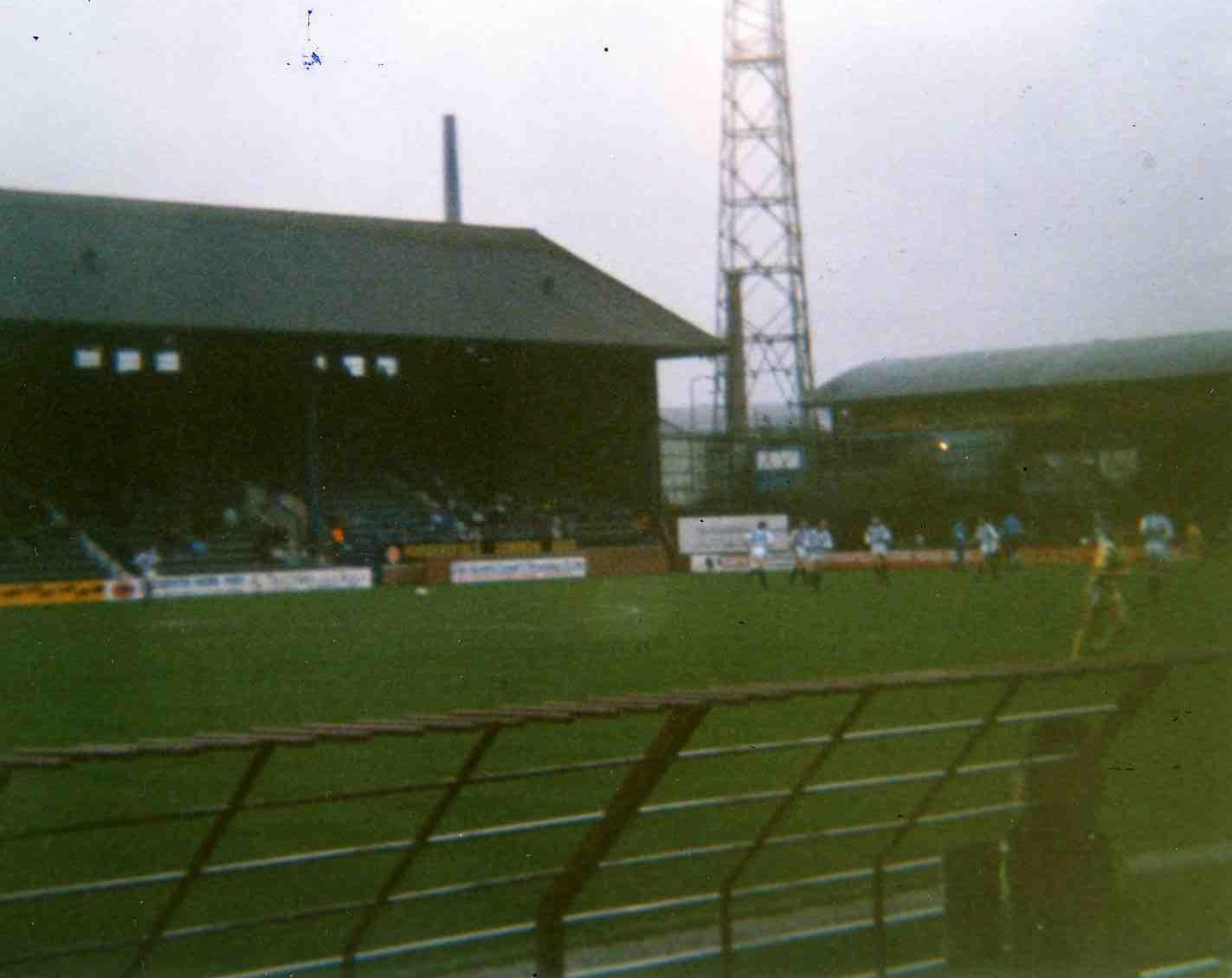
A defeat to Huddersfield Town at Leeds Road in 1954 was the only game played at the British Isles by Independiente

International tours with the majority of its matches taking place outside CONMEBOL associate countries and other invitational competitions involving non-CONMEBOL teams are shown.

==== Mexico ====
| Year | Opponent | Score | Venue |
|---|---|---|---|
| 1948 | (Mexico) Atlante | 3–3 | Estadio Ciudad de los Deportes, Mexico City, Mexico |
| 1948 | (Mexico) León | 1–1 | Estadio Ciudad de los Deportes, Mexico City, Mexico |
| 1948 | (Mexico) Oro | 1–1 | Estadio Ciudad de los Deportes, Mexico City, Mexico |
| 1948 | Mexico | 5–1 | Estadio Ciudad de los Deportes, Mexico City, Mexico |
| 1948 | (Mexico) Guadalajara | 2–2 | Estadio Felipe Martínez Sandoval, Guadalajara, Mexico |
| 1948 | (Mexico) León | 0–4 | Estadio Ciudad de los Deportes, Mexico City, Mexico |
| 1948 | (Mexico) Guadalajara | 3–0 | Estadio Ciudad de los Deportes, Mexico City, Mexico |
| 1948 | Mexico | 3–0 | Estadio Ciudad de los Deportes, Mexico City, Mexico |

==== Central America ====
| Year | Opponent | Score | Venue |
|---|---|---|---|
| 1951–52 | (Costa Rica) Alajuelense | 6–4 | Estadio Nacional, San José, Costa Rica |
| 1951–52 | (Costa Rica) Saprissa | 1–1 | Estadio Nacional, San José, Costa Rica |
| 1951–52 | Guatemala All-Stars | 8–2 | Estadio Doroteo Guamuch Flores, Guatemala City, Guatemala |
| 1951–52 | (Mexico) Necaxa | 3–0 | Estadio Ciudad de los Deportes, Mexico City, Mexico |
| 1951–52 | (Mexico) Atlante | 2–0 | Estadio Ciudad de los Deportes, Mexico City, Mexico |
| 1951–52 | (Mexico) Atlas | 3–3 | Estadio Ciudad de los Deportes, Mexico City, Mexico |
| 1951–52 | (Mexico) León | 4–1 | Estadio La Martinica, León, Mexico |
| 1951–52 | (Mexico) Guadalajara | 2–1 | Estadio Ciudad de los Deportes, Mexico City, Mexico |
| 1951–52 | (Mexico) Oro | 0–1 | Estadio Ciudad de los Deportes, Mexico City, Mexico |
| 1951–52 | (Mexico) Atlas | 1–1 | Estadio Ciudad de los Deportes, Mexico City, Mexico |
| 1951–52 | (Mexico) Puebla | 0–0 | Parque El Mirador, Puebla, Mexico |

==== Europe ====
| Year | Opponent | Score | Venue |
|---|---|---|---|
| 1953–54 | (Spain) Real Madrid | 6–0 | Estadio Chamartín, Madrid, Spain |
| 1953–54 | (Spain) Valencia | 3–0 | Mestalla Stadium, Valencia, Spain |
| 1953–54 | (Spain) Sevilla | 1–1 | Estadio de Nervión, Seville, Spain |
| 1953–54 | (Spain) Atlético Madrid | 5–3 | Estadio Metropolitano de Madrid, Madrid, Spain |
| 1953–54 | (Portugal) Benfica | 2–1 | Estádio da Luz, Lisbon, Portugal |
| 1953–54 | (Portugal) Sporting CP | 8–1 | Estádio da Luz, Lisbon, Portugal |
| 1953–54 | (Spain) Athletic Bilbao | 2–5 | San Mamés Stadium, Bilbao, Spain |
| 1953–54 | (Spain) Celta de Vigo | 2–1 | Balaídos, Vigo, Spain |
| 1953–54 | (France) Rouen | 2–3 | Stade Robert Diochon, Le Petit-Quevilly, France |
| 1953–54 | (Austria) Wiener Sportclub | 3–0 | Stade du Vivier d'Oie, Brussels, Belgium |
| 1953–54 | (Netherlands) Amsterdam XI | 3–1 | Olympic Stadium, Amsterdam, Netherlands |
| 1953–54 | (England) Huddersfield Town | 2–3 | Leeds Road, Huddersfield, England |

==== Mexico ====
| Year | Opponent | Score | Venue |
|---|---|---|---|
| 1961 | (Mexico) Oro | 1–2 | Estadio Olímpico Universitario, Mexico City, Mexico |
| 1961 | (Mexico) Guadalajara | 3–1 | Estadio Olímpico Universitario, Mexico City, Mexico |
| 1961 | (Brazil) Santos | 1–4 | Estadio Olímpico Universitario, Mexico City, Mexico |
| 1961 | (Mexico) Necaxa | 1–1 | Estadio Olímpico Universitario, Mexico City, Mexico |

==== United States and Canada ====
| Year | Opponent | Score | Venue |
|---|---|---|---|
| 1965 | (Switzerland) Italica Amriswil | 1–1 | Olympic Stadium, Montreal, Canada |
| 1965 | Canada | 10–1 | Exhibition Stadium, Toronto, Canada |
| 1965 | (Spain) Real Madrid | 1–1 | Downing Stadium, New York City, United States |
| 1965 | (Italy) Napoli | 1–0 | Giants Stadium, East Rutherford, United States |
| 1965 | (Italy) Napoli | 1–1 | Exhibition Stadium, Toronto, Canada |

==== Colombia and Central America ====
| Year | Opponent | Score | Venue |
|---|---|---|---|
| 1967 | (Colombia) Millonarios | 1–1 | Estadio Nemesio Camacho, Bogotá, Colombia |
| 1967 | (Colombia) Deportivo Cali | 3–0 | Estadio Nemesio Camacho, Bogotá, Colombia |
| 1967 | (El Salvador) Águila | 6–1 | Estadio Juan Francisco Barraza, San Miguel, El Salvador |
| 1967 | Honduras | 1–0 | Estadio Tiburcio Carías Andino, Tegucigalpa, Honduras |
| 1967 | Guatemala | 3–0 | Estadio Doroteo Guamuch Flores, Guatemala City, Guatemala |

==== Spain and Italy ====
| Year | Opponent | Score | Venue |
|---|---|---|---|
| 1967 | (Spain) Real Sociedad | 2–2 | Atotxa Stadium, San Sebastián, Spain |
| 1967 | (England) Chelsea | 1–2 | Atotxa Stadium, San Sebastián, Spain |
| 1967 | (Spain) Elche | 3–2 | Campo de Altabix, Elche, Spain |
| 1967 | (Spain) Málaga | 3–2 | Estadio Nuevo Arcángel, Córdoba, Spain |
| 1967 | (Spain) Córdoba | 1–0 | Estadio Nuevo Arcángel, Córdoba, Spain |
| 1967 | (Italy) Bologna | 5–4 | Stadio Renato Dall'Ara, Bologna, Italy |
| 1967 | (Italy) Napoli | 0–2 | Stadio San Paolo, Naples, Italy |
| 1967 | (Italy) Mantova | 2–0 | Stadio Danilo Martelli, Mantua, Italy |

==== Uruguay ====
| Year | Opponent | Score | Venue |
|---|---|---|---|
| 1969 | (Soviet Union) Torpedo Moscow | 4–1 | Estadio Centenario, Montevideo, Uruguay |
| 1969 | (Uruguay) Peñarol | 1–2 | Estadio Centenario, Montevideo, Uruguay |
| 1969 | (Uruguay) Nacional | 0–2 | Estadio Centenario, Montevideo, Uruguay |
| 1969 | (Czechoslovakia) Sparta Prague | 2–5 | Estadio Centenario, Montevideo, Uruguay |

==== Yugoslavia and Spain ====
| Year | Opponent | Score | Venue |
|---|---|---|---|
| 1970 | (Socialist Federal Republic of Yugoslavia) Red Star Belgrade | 0–3 | Red Star Stadium, Belgrade, Yugoslavia |
| 1970 | (Socialist Federal Republic of Yugoslavia) Sarajevo | 1–0 | Koševo City Stadium, Sarajevo, Yugoslavia |
| 1970 | (Spain) Athletic Bilbao | 2–0 | Estadio Ramón de Carranza, Cádiz, Spain |
| 1970 | (Spain) Real Madrid | 2–4 (aet) | Estadio Ramón de Carranza, Cádiz, Spain |
| 1970 | (Socialist Federal Republic of Yugoslavia) Partizan | 3–2 | Mestalla Stadium, Valencia, Spain |
| 1970 | (Spain) Valencia | 0–0 (2–5 P) | Mestalla Stadium, Valencia, Spain |

==== Central America ====
| Year | Opponent | Score | Venue |
|---|---|---|---|
| 1971 | (Honduras) Olimpia | 1–1 | Estadio Tiburcio Carías Andino, Tegucigalpa, Honduras |
| 1971 | (Honduras) Marathón | 3–0 | Estadio General Francisco Morazán, San Pedro Sula, Honduras |
| 1971 | (Guatemala) Municipal | 2–1 | Estadio El Trébol, Guatemala City, Guatemala |
| 1971 | (Guatemala) Comunicaciones | 2–3 | Estadio Doroteo Guamuch Flores, Guatemala City, Guatemala |
| 1971 | (Guatemala) Comunicaciones | 3–0 | Estadio Doroteo Guamuch Flores, Guatemala City, Guatemala |
| 1971 | (Mexico) San Isidro Laguna | 5–5 | Estadio San Isidro, Torreón, Mexico |
| 1971 | (Mexico) Torreón | 0–0 | Estadio San Isidro, Torreón, Mexico |

==== Eurasia ====
| Year | Opponent | Score | Venue |
|---|---|---|---|
| 1972 | One match belonging to the Intercontinental Cup | | |
| 1972 | (Netherlands) Rijswijk | 5–0 | Prinses Irene Sportpark, Rijswijk, Netherlands |
| 1972 | (Turkey) Besiktas | 1–1 | İnönü Stadium, Istanbul, Turkey |
| 1972 | (Greece) Panathinaikos | 1–0 | Leoforos Alexandras Stadium, Athens, Greece |
| 1972 | (Italy) Roma | 2–2 | Stadio Olimpico, Rome, Italy |
| 1972 | Israel | 0–0 | Bloomfield Stadium, Tel Aviv, Israel |
| 1972 | (Spain) Atlético Madrid | 1–2 | Vicente Calderón Stadium, Madrid, Spain |

==== Spain and Venezuela ====
| Year | Opponent | Score | Venue |
|---|---|---|---|
| 1973 | (Spain) Sevilla | 0–2 | Estadio Benito Villamarín, Seville, Spain |
| 1973 | (Spain) Real Betis | 1–1 (2–3 P) | Estadio Benito Villamarín, Seville, Spain |
| 1973 | (Spain) Celta de Vigo | 2–0 | Estadio Olímpico de la UCV, Caracas, Venezuela |
| 1973 | (Spain) Celta de Vigo | 1–0 | Estadio Olímpico de la UCV, Caracas, Venezuela |

==== Mexico ====
| Year | Opponent | Score | Venue |
|---|---|---|---|
| 1974 | (Mexico) Atlante | 3–3 | Estadio Azteca, Mexico City, Mexico |
| 1974 | (Mexico) América | 1–1 | Estadio Azteca, Mexico City, Mexico |
| 1974 | (Italy) Inter Milan | 1–0 | Estadio Azteca, Mexico City, Mexico |
| 1974 | (Mexico) Atlético Español | 5–2 | Estadio Azteca, Mexico City, Mexico |

==== United States and Indonesia ====
| Year | Opponent | Score | Venue |
|---|---|---|---|
| 1975 | (Mexico) Leones Negros UdeG | 2–1 | Los Angeles Memorial Coliseum, Los Angeles, United States |
| 1975 | (Indonesia) Persija Jakarta | 1–1 | Gelora Bung Karno Stadium, Central Jakarta, Indonesia |
| 1975 | Indonesia | 4–2 | Gelora Bung Karno Stadium, Central Jakarta, Indonesia |
| 1975 | (Indonesia) Sumatra | 4–1 | Teladan Stadium, Medan, Indonesia |
| 1975 | (Indonesia) Medan | 7–1 | Teladan Stadium, Medan, Indonesia |

==== Costa Rica and Guatemala ====
| Year | Opponent | Score | Venue |
|---|---|---|---|
| 1975 | Costa Rica | 2–0 | Estadio Nacional, San José, Costa Rica |
| 1975 | (Costa Rica) Herediano | 1–0 | Estadio Nacional, San José, Costa Rica |
| 1975 | Guatemala U-23 | 4–1 | Estadio Doroteo Guamuch Flores, Guatemala City, Guatemala |

==== Haiti ====
| Year | Opponent | Score | Venue |
|---|---|---|---|
| 1976 | (Haiti) Aigle Noir | 2–1 | Stade Sylvio Cator, Port-au-Prince, Haiti |
| 1976 | Haiti | 1–0 | Stade Sylvio Cator, Port-au-Prince, Haiti |
| 1976 | (Haiti) Violette | 3–1 | Stade Sylvio Cator, Port-au-Prince, Haiti |

==== Japan ====
| Year | Opponent | Score | Venue |
|---|---|---|---|
| 1977 | Japan | 3–2 | Olympic Stadium, Tokyo, Japan |
| 1977 | Japan | 0–0 | Yanmar Stadium Nagai, Osaka, Japan |

==== United States ====
| Year | Opponent | Score | Venue |
|---|---|---|---|
| 1978 | (Mexico) Tecos | 0–1 | Los Angeles Memorial Coliseum, Los Angeles, United States |
| 1978 | (Brazil) Cruzeiro | 0–2 | Los Angeles Memorial Coliseum, Los Angeles, United States |

==== Spain ====
| Year | Opponent | Score | Venue |
|---|---|---|---|
| 1981 | (Brazil) Vasco da Gama | 2–1 | Vicente Calderón Stadium, Madrid, Spain |
| 1981 | Honduras | 2–0 | Vicente Calderón Stadium, Madrid, Spain |

==== United States and Europe ====
| Year | Opponent | Score | Venue |
|---|---|---|---|
| 1985 | (United States) Tulsa Roughnecks | 2–1 | Skelly Stadium, Tulsa, United States |
| 1985 | (United States) New York Cosmos | 2–2 | Giants Stadium, East Rutherford, United States |
| 1985 | (Mexico) Tecos | 0–0 | Spartan Stadium, San Jose, United States |
| 1985 | (United States) San Jose Earthquakes | 4–1 | Spartan Stadium, San Jose, United States |
| 1985 | (Mexico) Tampico Madero | 3–1 | Estadio Olímpico Benito Juárez, Ciudad Juárez, Mexico |
| 1985 | (Brazil) Santos | 1–1 (4–2 P) | Stadio Dino Manuzzi, Cesena, Italy |
| 1985 | (Uruguay) Peñarol | 1–3 | Stadio Dino Manuzzi, Cesena, Italy |
| 1985 | (Italy) Sampdoria | 0–1 | Stadio Luigi Ferraris, Genoa, Italy |
| 1985 | (Spain) Athletic Bilbao | 0–0 | San Mamés Stadium, Bilbao, Spain |

==== United States ====
| Year | Opponent | Score | Venue |
|---|---|---|---|
| 1986 | (Colombia) Junior | 2–1 | Joe Robbie Stadium, Miami Gardens, United States |
| 1986 | (Northern Ireland) Linfield | 2–1 | Joe Robbie Stadium, Miami Gardens, United States |

==== Guatemala and the United States ====
| Year | Opponent | Score | Venue |
|---|---|---|---|
| 1989 | Guatemala | 1–0 | Estadio Doroteo Guamuch Flores, Guatemala City, Guatemala |
| 1989 | (England) Arsenal | 1–2 | Joe Robbie Stadium, Miami Gardens, United States |

==== Mexico ====
| Year | Opponent | Score | Venue |
|---|---|---|---|
| 1993 | (Mexico) Atlante | 1–1 | Estadio Universitario, Monterrey, Mexico |
| 1993 | (Mexico) UANL | 2–1 | Estadio Universitario, Monterrey, Mexico |
| 1993 | (Netherlands) Cambuur | 3–2 | Estadio Universitario, Monterrey, Mexico |

==== Japan ====
| Year | Opponent | Score | Venue |
|---|---|---|---|
| 1994 | (Japan) Sanfrecce Hiroshima | 5–0 | Izumo Dome, Izumo, Japan |
| 1994 | (Japan) Urawa Red Diamonds | 5–3 | Urawa Komaba Stadium, Saitama, Japan |
| 1994 | (Japan) Sanfrecce Hiroshima | 3–1 | Oita Athletic Stadium, Oita, Japan |

==== United States and Canada ====
| Year | Opponent | Score | Venue |
|---|---|---|---|
| 2008 | (United States) Columbus Crew | 0–1 | Crew Stadium, Columbus, United States |
| 2008 | (United States) Atlanta Silverbacks | 2–1 | Atlanta Silverbacks Park, Atlanta, United States |
| 2008 | (Canada) Toronto FC | 1–0 | BMO Field, Toronto, Canada |

==== Mexico and the United States ====
| Year | Opponent | Score | Venue |
|---|---|---|---|
| 2011 | (Mexico) Monterrey | 0–1 | Estadio Tecnológico, Monterrey, Mexico |
| 2011 | (United States) Oxnard College | 8–0 | Oxnard College, Oxnard, United States |
| 2011 | (United States) Ventura County Fusion | 3–0 | Oxnard College, Oxnard, United States |
| 2011 | (United States) Portland Timbers | 0–2 | Providence Park, Portland, United States |

=== Honours ===
- Trofeo Asociación Anglo-Argentine: 1912
- Torneo Internacional Nocturno: 1936
- Copa Confraternidad: 1939
- Trofeo Universidad de Chile: 1940
- Copa Fraternidad: 1941
- Copa Intendente Municipal: 1941
- Copa Ministerio de Hacienda: 1941
- Copa Presidente M. Prado: 1941
- Copa Fajer: 1948
- Torneio Cuadrangular de Lisboa: 1953
- Torneo Cuadrangular de Buenos Aires: 1955
- Torneo Internacional de Chile: 1964
- Consular Cup: 1965
- Trofeo Festa d'Elx: 1967
- Trofeo Internacional Montilla Moriles: 1967
- Trofeo IPSP: 1973
- Souvenir Program 50c Trophy: 1975
- Torneo Pentagonal de Cochabamba: 1975
- Copa de Oro (Mar del Plata) (2): 1980, 1981
- Trofeo Villa de Madrid: 1981
- Torneo Internacional de Miami: 1986
- Copa de las Instituciones: 1993
- Copa Carlos S. Menem: 1994
- Copa de Invierno: 1997
- Copa Cerveza Cristal: 2003
- Copa Alberto Zozaya: 2009
- Copa Ciudad de Pelotas: 2012

== See also ==
- List of CONMEBOL club competition winners
- List of Copa Libertadores finals
- List of world champion football clubs
