= Wágner (footballer, born 1945) =

Brazilian footballer and manager

Personal information
- Full name: Wágner Canotilho
- Date of birth: 29 March 1945 (age 81)
- Place of birth: São Paulo, Brazil
- Position: Midfielder

Senior career*
Years	Team	Apps	(Gls)
1963	Juventus		
1963–1967	Leixões	99	(19)
1968	Portuguesa		
1968–1971	Vitória de Setúbal	78	(14)
1971–1975	Sporting	85	(9)
1975–1978	Vitória de Setúbal	56	(4)

Managerial career
- 1996–1998: O Elvas
- 1998–1999: União Montemor
- * Club domestic league appearances and goals

Wágner Canotilho or simply Wágner (born 29 March 1945) is a Brazilian football manager and a former player.

He played 14 seasons and 318 games in the Primeira Liga for Vitória de Setúbal, Leixões and Sporting.

== Career ==
Wágner made his Primeira Liga debut for Leixões on 27 October 1963 in a game against Porto.

== Honours ==
Sporting

- Primeira Liga champion: 1973–74.
- Taça de Portugal winner: 1972–73, 1973–74.
- Torneio de Atenas: 1974
- Torneio de Sevilha: 1974
- Mini copa do mundo ( Caracas - Venezuela ) 1970
- Troféu Teresa Herrera: 1969
- Troféu Iberico: 1968
