= 1973–74 Primeira Divisão =

40th season of top-tier Portuguese football

Primeira Liga
- Season: 1973–74
- Champions: Sporting CP; 14th title
- Matches: 240
- Goals: 691 (2.88 per match)

Statistics of Portuguese Liga in the 1973–74 season.

== Overview ==
It was contested by 16 teams, and Sporting Clube de Portugal won the championship.

== League standings ==
| Pos | Team | Pld | W | D | L | GF | GA | GD | Pts | Qualification or relegation |
|---|---|---|---|---|---|---|---|---|---|---|
| 1 | Sporting CP (C) | 30 | 23 | 3 | 4 | 96 | 21 | +75 | 49 | Qualification to European Cup first round |
| 2 | Benfica | 30 | 21 | 5 | 4 | 68 | 23 | +45 | 47 | Qualification to Cup Winners' Cup first round (Note: Benfica qualified for the Cup Winners' Cup as runners-up of the 1974 Taça de Portugal Final, because Taça de Portugal winners, Sporting qualified for the European Cup.) |
| 3 | Vitória de Setúbal | 30 | 19 | 7 | 4 | 69 | 21 | +48 | 45 | Qualification to UEFA Cup first round |
| 4 | Porto | 30 | 18 | 7 | 5 | 43 | 22 | +21 | 43 | Qualification to UEFA Cup first round |
| 5 | Belenenses | 30 | 17 | 6 | 7 | 56 | 34 | +22 | 40 | Qualification to UEFA Cup first round |
| 6 | Vitória de Guimarães | 30 | 10 | 11 | 9 | 36 | 34 | +2 | 31 | |
| 7 | Farense | 30 | 9 | 8 | 13 | 35 | 38 | −3 | 26 | |
| 8 | CUF Barreiro | 30 | 8 | 9 | 13 | 33 | 44 | −11 | 25 | |
| 9 | Boavista | 30 | 9 | 7 | 14 | 35 | 43 | −8 | 25 | |
| 10 | Académica | 30 | 8 | 7 | 15 | 29 | 45 | −16 | 23 | |
| 11 | Olhanense | 30 | 8 | 6 | 16 | 35 | 69 | −34 | 22 | |
| 12 | Oriental | 30 | 10 | 1 | 19 | 35 | 79 | −44 | 21 | |
| 13 | Beira-Mar (R) | 30 | 7 | 7 | 16 | 34 | 59 | −25 | 21 | Relegation to Segunda Divisão |
| 14 | Leixões | 30 | 9 | 3 | 18 | 36 | 56 | −20 | 21 | |
| 15 | Barreirense (R) | 30 | 6 | 9 | 15 | 19 | 42 | −23 | 21 | Relegation to Segunda Divisão |
| 16 | Montijo (R) | 30 | 7 | 6 | 17 | 32 | 61 | −29 | 20 | Relegation to Segunda Divisão |

Source: RSSSF
(C) Champions; (R) Relegated

== Results ==
| Home \ Away | ACA | BAR | BEM | BEL | BEN | BOA | CUF | FAR | LEI | MON | OLH | ORI | POR | SCP | VGU | VSE |
|---|---|---|---|---|---|---|---|---|---|---|---|---|---|---|---|---|
| Académica | | 6–1 | 1–1 | 0–0 | 2–0 | 2–1 | 1–2 | 1–0 | 2–0 | 1–2 | 1–1 | 3–0 | 1–1 | 1–3 | 2–1 | 0–3 |
| Barreirense | 1–0 | | 2–0 | 1–0 | 0–0 | 1–0 | 0–0 | 2–1 | 1–0 | 1–1 | 1–1 | 0–1 | 1–2 | 0–3 | 1–1 | 0–0 |
| Beira Mar | 1–1 | 3–2 | | 1–2 | 1–1 | 0–0 | 2–0 | 3–1 | 3–2 | 3–1 | 4–2 | 2–3 | 1–2 | 1–1 | 0–1 | 0–3 |
| Belenenses | 6–0 | 1–0 | 4–1 | | 1–2 | 4–1 | 2–1 | 3–1 | 4–3 | 3–0 | 3–0 | 3–1 | 1–0 | 1–0 | 2–0 | 2–1 |
| Benfica | 5–0 | 4–0 | 2–0 | 3–1 | | 2–0 | 1–0 | 1–0 | 3–0 | 5–1 | 4–1 | 2–0 | 2–1 | 2–0 | 5–1 | 2–3 |
| Boavista | 2–0 | 2–0 | 2–0 | 1–1 | 2–0 | | 0–1 | 1–0 | 2–2 | 4–0 | 2–0 | 3–1 | 0–2 | 1–1 | 1–1 | 0–1 |
| CUF Barreiro | 0–0 | 2–0 | 4–1 | 0–1 | 0–2 | 0–0 | | 0–1 | 0–3 | 2–1 | 6–1 | 4–2 | 0–0 | 0–3 | 1–1 | 2–1 |
| Farense | 4–1 | 1–1 | 1–1 | 2–1 | 0–0 | 4–1 | 2–2 | | 2–0 | 3–2 | 3–1 | 2–1 | 2–2 | 0–2 | 2–2 | 0–2 |
| Leixões | 1–0 | 1–0 | 4–0 | 1–1 | 0–1 | 2–0 | 3–1 | 0–0 | | 4–2 | 3–1 | 1–3 | 2–0 | 0–3 | 0–2 | 0–1 |
| Montijo | 1–0 | 1–0 | 2–0 | 0–0 | 0–1 | 2–2 | 0–0 | 0–2 | 1–0 | | 1–0 | 8–1 | 1–2 | 1–4 | 1–1 | 0–3 |
| Olhanense | 0–0 | 1–0 | 4–2 | 2–2 | 1–7 | 2–0 | 2–2 | 1–0 | 4–0 | 2–0 | | 4–1 | 2–1 | 1–3 | 0–2 | 0–0 |
| Oriental | 0–3 | 2–1 | 0–1 | 2–3 | 1–3 | 3–1 | 3–2 | 1–0 | 3–2 | 1–1 | 2–0 | | 1–3 | 0–7 | 1–0 | 0–3 |
| Porto | 1–0 | 1–0 | 3–0 | 2–0 | 2–1 | 4–2 | 1–1 | 1–0 | 2–1 | 1–0 | 2–0 | 1–0 | | 1–1 | 3–0 | 2–0 |
| Sporting CP | 3–0 | 6–1 | 5–2 | 4–1 | 3–5 | 3–1 | 6–0 | 3–0 | 3–0 | 8–0 | 5–0 | 8–0 | 2–0 | | 3–0 | 2–1 |
| Vitória de Guimarães | 1–0 | 0–0 | 3–0 | 1–1 | 0–0 | 0–2 | 2–0 | 1–1 | 5–0 | 1–0 | 3–1 | 4–1 | 0–0 | 0–1 | | 1–4 |
| Vitória de Setúbal | 3–0 | 1–1 | 0–0 | 3–2 | 2–2 | 4–1 | 2–0 | 1–0 | 6–1 | 6–2 | 9–0 | 4–0 | 0–0 | 1–0 | 1–1 | |

Legend: Blue = home team win; Yellow = draw; Red = away team win.

== Season statistics ==
=== Top goalscorers ===
| Rank | Player | Club | Goals |
|---|---|---|---|
| 1 | (Argentina) Héctor Yazalde | Sporting | 46 |
| 2 | (Brazil) Duda | Vitória de Setúbal | 24 |
| 3 | (Portugal) Eusébio | Benfica | 16 |
| 4 | (Portugal) José Torres | Vitória de Setúbal | 15 |
| 4 | (Portugal) Rui Jordão | Benfica | 15 |
| 6 | (Portugal) Abel | Porto | 14 |
| 7 | (Brazil) Mirobaldo | Farense | 13 |
| 7 | (Portugal) Arnaldo | Fabril Barreiro | 13 |
| 7 | (Paraguay) Francisco González | Belenenses | 13 |
| 10 | (Brazil) Ademir | Olhanense | 12 |
