= 1974 Taça de Portugal final =

- Event: 1973–74 Taça de Portugal
Benfica	Sporting CP
1	2
- Date: 9 June 1974
- Venue: Estádio Nacional, Oeiras
- Referee: César Correia (Algarve)

The 1974 Taça de Portugal final was the final match of the 1973–74 Taça de Portugal, the 34th season of the Taça de Portugal, the premier Portuguese football cup competition organized by the Portuguese Football Federation (FPF). The match was played on 9 June 1974 at the Estádio Nacional in Oeiras, and opposed two Primeira Liga sides: Benfica and Sporting CP. Sporting CP defeated Benfica 2–1 to claim a ninth Taça de Portugal.

== Match ==
=== Details ===
9 June 1974

Benfica	1–2 (a.e.t.)	Sporting CP
Nené 32'		Faria 89'; Marinho 107'

Estádio Nacional, Oeiras
Referee: César Correia (Algarve)

Benfica	Sporting CP

GK	1	(Portugal) Manuel Bento
DF	(Portugal) António Barros
DF	(Portugal) Rui Rodrigues	(substituted off) 67'
DF	(Portugal) Artur Correia
DF	(Portugal) Humberto Coelho
MF	11	(Portugal) António Simões (c)
MF	(Portugal) Toni	(substituted off) 45'
MF	(Portugal) Vítor Martins
FW	(Portugal) Rui Jordão
FW	(Portugal) Nené
FW	(Portugal) Vítor Baptista
Substitutes:
DF	(Portugal) Adolfo Calisto	(substituted on) 67'
FW	(Portugal) Eusébio	(substituted on) 45'
Manager:
(Portugal) Fernando Cabrita

GK	1	(Portugal) Vítor Damas (c)
DF	(Portugal) Carlos Alhinho
DF	(Portugal) Manaca
DF	(Portugal) Vitorino Bastos
MF	(Portugal) Nélson Fernandes
MF	(Brazil) Wágner Canotilho	(substituted off) 105'
MF	(Portugal) Baltasar
MF	(Brazil) Dé
MF	(Portugal) Paulo Rocha	(substituted off) 73'
FW	(Portugal) Marinho
FW	(Portugal) Joaquim Dinis
Substitutes:
MF	(Portugal) Dani Silva	(substituted on) 105'
FW	(Portugal) Chico Faria	(substituted on) 73'
Manager:
(Portugal) Mário Lino

1973–74 Taça de Portugal Winners
Sporting CP
9th Title

Match officials

- Assistant referees:
- Fourth official:

Match rules

- 90 minutes.
- 30 minutes of extra time if necessary.
- Maximum of two substitutions

== See also ==
- Derby de Lisboa
- 1973–74 S.L. Benfica season
