= 1917 Tie Cup final =

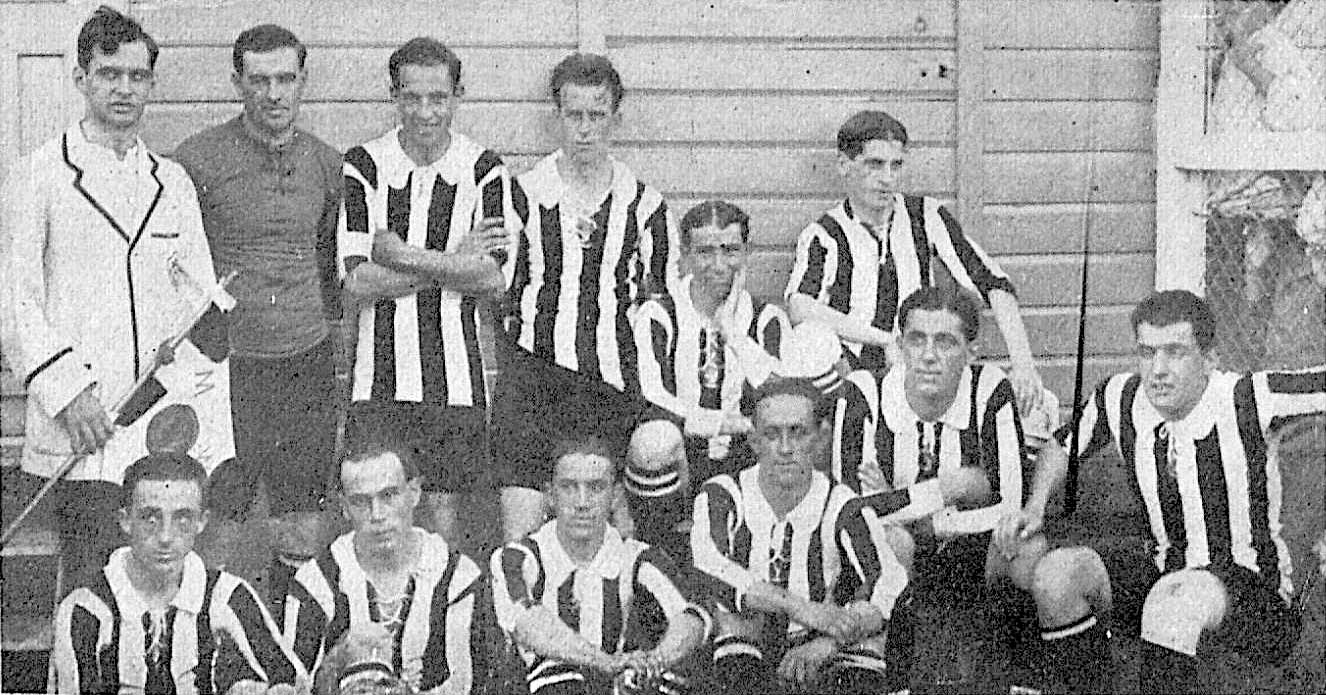
- Team of Wanderers, winners
- Event: 1917 Tie Cup
| Independiente | Wanderers |
| (Argentina) | (Uruguay) |
| 0 | 4 |
- Abandoned at 86'
- Date: 21 April 1918
- Venue: Racing Club, Avellaneda
- Referee: Germán Guassone (Argentina)

The 1917 Tie Cup final was the final match to decide the winner of the Tie Cup, the 18th edition of the international competition organised by the Argentine and Uruguayan Associations together. The final was contested by Argentine side Wanderers and Uruguayan club Wanderers ,

In the match, played at Estadio Racing Club in Avellaneda, Wanderers beat Independiente (debuting) 4–0, winning its second Tie Cup trophy over three finals played.

== Qualified teams ==
| Team | Qualification | Previous final app. |
|---|---|---|
| (Argentina) Independiente | 1917 Copa de Competencia (A) champions | (none) |
| (Uruguay) Wanderers | 1917 Copa de Competencia (U) champions | 2 (1908, **1911**) |

- **Bold** indicates winning years

== Overview ==
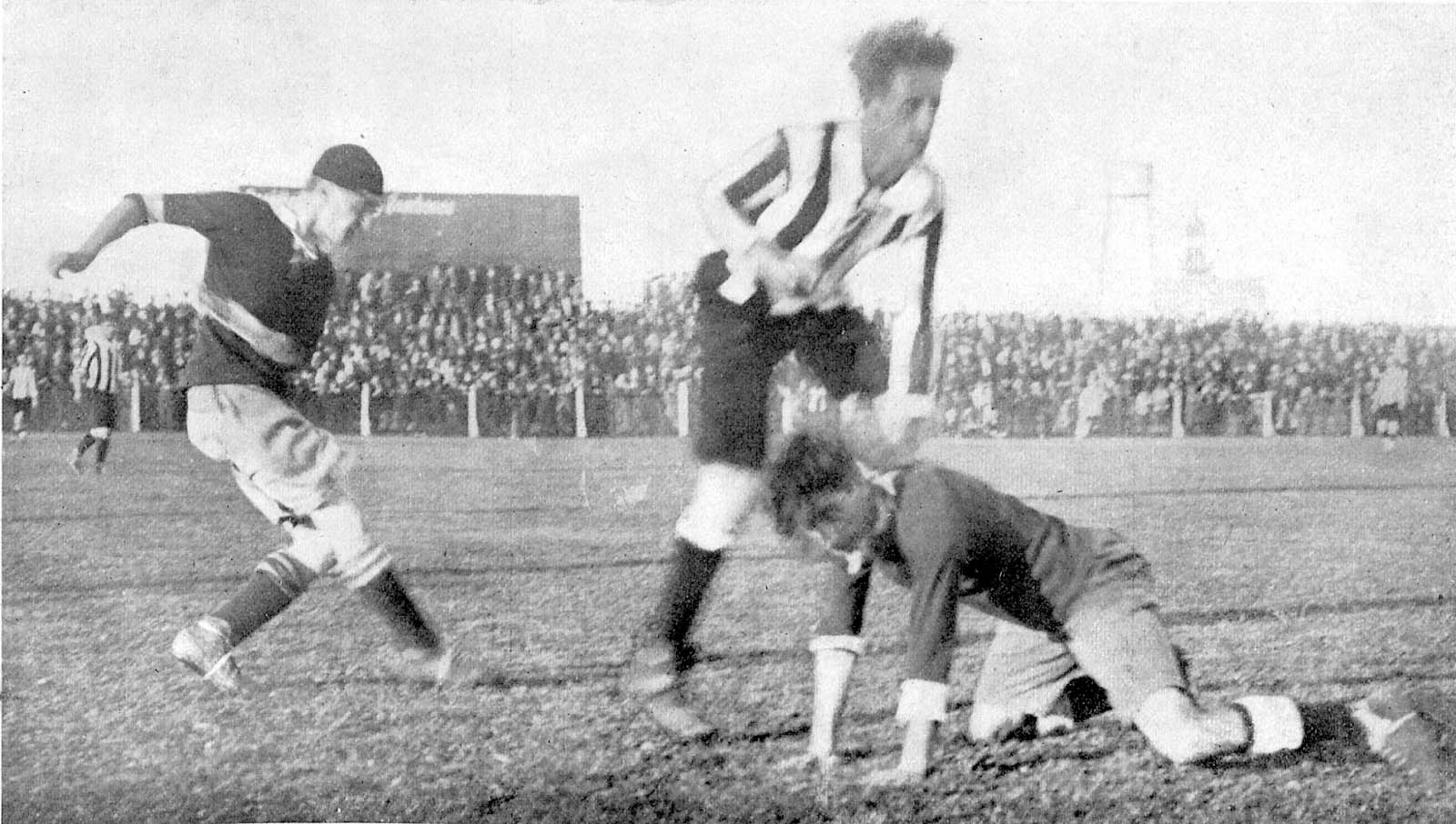
Scene of the match, fiercely disputed

Independiente earned its place in the final as the winner of 1917 Copa de Competencia Jockey Club, after beating arch-rival Racing in two re-match games (1–1, 0–0, 1–0), Ferro Carril Oeste (3–1 in Caballito), Columbian (2–1), San Lorenzo (2–0), Rosario Central (6–2 in the semifinal) and Estudiantes de La Plata (2–1 in the final).

The final was held in Estadio Racing Club in Avellaneda on April 21, 1918, with a large number of spectators attending the match. On 20 minutes of play, Villar shot for the first goal of the Uruguayan team. The first half ended with Wanderers winning 10. In the second half, Villar ran for the wing to make a pass to Landeira who headed for the second goal.

When Bastos started a large race near the border line and passed the ball to Villar, who passed to Landeira, kicking for the third goal. On 40 minutes, Villar scored the fourth goal, giving Wanderers its second title. Before restarting the game from the centre circle, one of the spectators entered to the field to hit referee Guassone. He was followed by most part of the attendance, thus causing the match to be suspended before the regulatory time. Wanderers was crowned champion of the competition.

== Match details ==
1917 Tie Cup Final
21 April 1918

| Independiente (Argentina) | 0–4 Abandoned at 86' | (Uruguay) Wanderers |
|---|---|---|
| | Report | Villar 20', 85'; Landeira 63', 71' |

Racing Club, Avellaneda
Referee: Germán Guassone (Argentina)

| **Independiente** | **Wanderers** |

| GK | (Argentina) Secundino Miguenz |
| DF | (Argentina) Antonio Ferro |
| DF | (Argentina) Roberto Sande |
| MF | (Argentina) Juan Cánepa |
| MF | (Argentina) Ernesto Sande |
| MF | (Argentina) Guillermo Ronzoni |
| FW | (Uruguay) Zoilo Canavery |
| FW | (Argentina) Pascual Garré |
| FW | (Argentina) E. García |
| FW | (Argentina) Juan Siciliani |
| FW | (Argentina) Gualberto Galeano |

| GK | (Uruguay) C. Saporiti |
| DF | (Uruguay) A. Révori |
| DF | (Uruguay) J. Morroni |
| MF | (Uruguay) A. García |
| MF | (Uruguay) A. Zibecchi |
| MF | (Uruguay) E. Chiesa |
| FW | (Uruguay) F. Buffoni |
| FW | (Uruguay) J. Landeira |
| FW | (Uruguay) Pablo Dacal |
| FW | (Uruguay) J.M. Villar |
| FW | (Uruguay) C. Bastos |
