= Francisco Rebelo =

Portuguese footballer

Personal information
- Full name: Francisco Moreira Silva Rebelo
- Date of birth: 12 October 1947 (age 79)
- Place of birth: Setúbal, Portugal
- Position: Right back

Youth career
- 1962–1966: Vitória Setúbal

Senior career*
Years	Team	Apps	(Gls)
1966–1980	Vitória Setúbal	232	(1)
1980–1982	Amora	48	(1)

International career
1971–1975	Portugal	8	(0)
- * Club domestic league appearances and goals

Francisco Moreira Silva Rebelo (born 12 October 1947 in Setúbal) is a former Portuguese footballer who played for Vitória Setúbal and Amora, as right back.

Rebelo gained 8 caps for the Portugal national team.
