= José Mendes (footballer) =

Portuguese footballer

Personal information
- Full name: José de Jesus Mendes
- Date of birth: 16 January 1947 (age 79)
- Place of birth: Portugal
- Position: Defender

Senior career*
| Years | Team | Apps | (Gls) |
| 1968–1972 | Vitória Setúbal | | |
| 1972–1977 | Sporting CP | | |

International career
| 1971–1976 | Portugal | 8 | (0) |
- * Club domestic league appearances and goals

José de Jesus Mendes (born 16 January 1947) is a former Portuguese footballer who played as defender.

== Football career ==
Mendes gained 8 caps for Portugal and made his debut against Belgium on 21 November 1971 in Lisbon, in a 1-1 draw.
