= 1948 Campeonato Uruguayo Primera División =

45th season of the top-tier football league in Uruguay

Uruguayan Primera División
- Season: 1948
- Champions: (no title awarded)

Statistics of Primera División Uruguaya for the 1948 season.

== Overview ==
It was contested by 10 teams, and it was not finished due to a player strike.

== League standings ==
Pos	Team	Pld	W	D	L	GF	GA	GD	Pts
1	Nacional	10	8	2	0	29	6	+23	18
2	Peñarol	10	8	1	1	24	9	+15	17
3	River Plate	10	5	2	3	20	18	+2	12
4	Rampla Juniors	10	4	2	4	20	16	+4	10
5	Liverpool	10	4	2	4	18	22	−4	10
6	Defensor	10	3	3	4	19	21	−2	9
7	Central	10	3	2	5	17	22	−5	8
8	Montevideo Wanderers	10	2	2	6	17	25	−8	6
9	Danubio	10	0	5	5	14	25	−11	5
10	Cerro	10	1	3	6	12	26	−14	5

Source: rsssf.com
