= Trofeo Villa de Madrid =

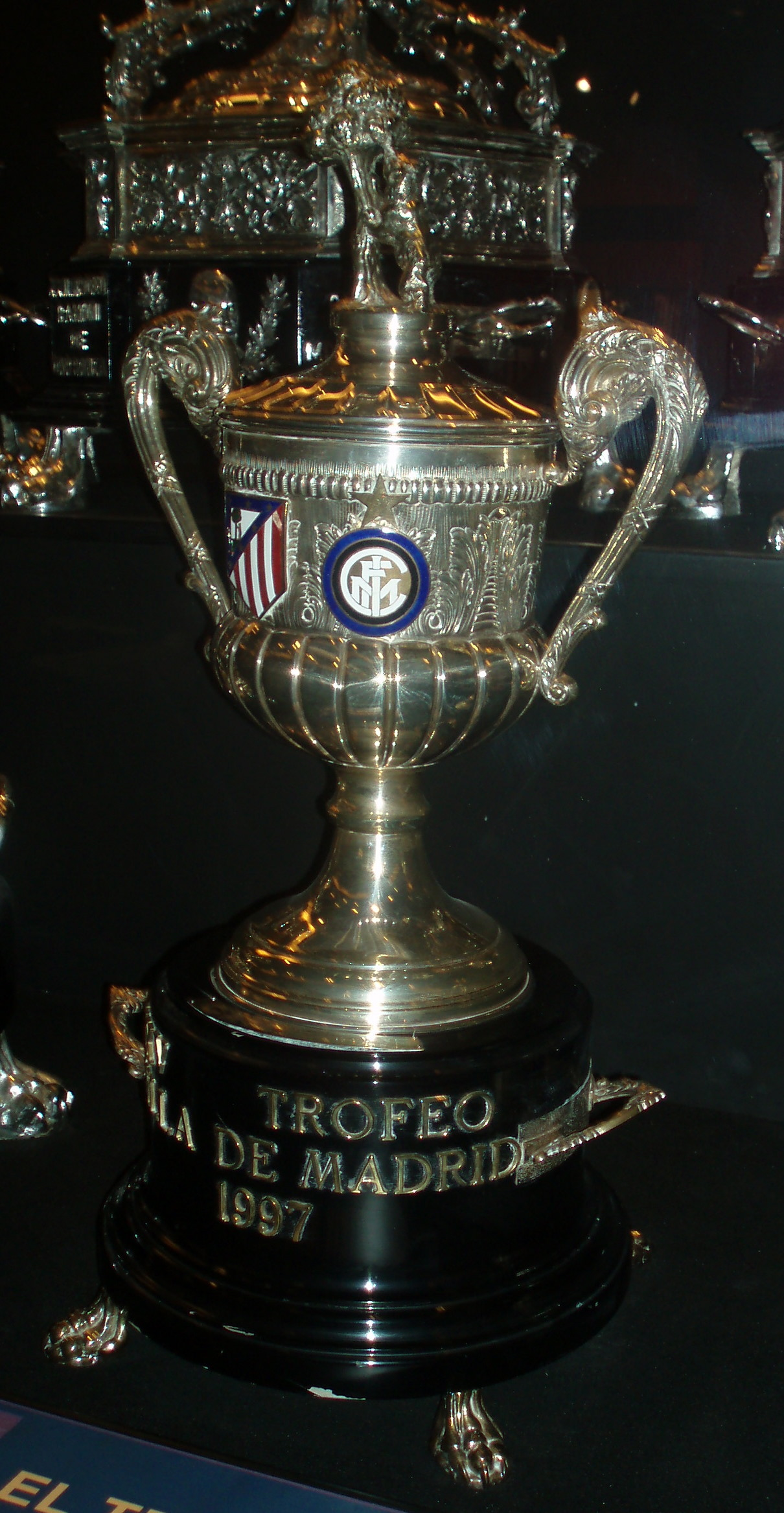
- The trophy awarded to champions
- Organiser(s): (Spain) Club Atlético de Madrid
- Founded: 1973
- Abolished: 2003; 23 years ago
- Region: Madrid, Spain
- Teams: 2 (2003)
- Related competitions: Joan Gamper Trophy
- Last champions: (Spain) Atlético Madrid (2003)
- Most championships: (Spain) Atlético Madrid (18 titles)

The Villa de Madrid Trophy (Spanish: Trofeo Villa de Madrid) was an annual pre-season football tournament hosted by Atlético Madrid at the Vicente Calderón Stadium played since 1973, with the exception of 1999 and 2001. In 2004 the tournament changed its name to "Trophy Hellboy", but was discontinued in the subsequent seasons.

The hosts, Atlético Madrid, are the top winners with 18 victories. Immediately behind them is A.C. Milan with three. They are followed by a group of teams with a win in the competition such as Liverpool, PSV Eindhoven, Werder Bremen, Independiente and River Plate. Initially, the competition was a four-team tournament and included two semi-finals, a third place play-off, and a final, but from 1994 to 2003 the tournament was played in a single match format.

== List of winners ==
Ed.	Year	Winners	Score	Runners up
1	1973	(Italy) Milan	2–1	(Socialist Federal Republic of Yugoslavia) JSD Partizan
2	1974	(Spain) Atlético Madrid	1–0	(Hungary) Újpest
3	1975	(Spain) Atlético Madrid	2–1	(Soviet Union) Torpedo Moscow
4	1976	(Spain) Atlético Madrid	1–0	(Spain) Athletic Bilbao
5	1977	(Italy) Milan	3–2	(Brazil) América
6	1978	(Argentina) River Plate	0–0 (4–3 p)	(Spain) Atlético Madrid
7	1979	(Germany) VfB Stuttgart	1–0	(Switzerland) Grasshopper
8	1980	(Spain) Atlético Madrid	1–1 (p)	(Netherlands) Ajax
9	1981	(Argentina) Independiente	1–0	Honduras
10	1982	(Germany) Borussia Dortmund	2–0	(Spain) Atlético Madrid
11	1983	(Spain) Atlético Madrid	2–1	(Spain) Sevilla
12	1984	(Netherlands) PSV	– (Note: Three-team tournament, defined on points)	(Spain) Atlético Madrid
13	1985	(Spain) Atlético Madrid	2–0	(Brazil) Grêmio
14	1986	(Spain) Atlético Madrid	3–2	(Brazil) Flamengo
15	1987	(England) Liverpool	1–0	(Spain) Atlético Madrid
16	1988	(Germany) Werder Bremen	1–0	(Spain) Atlético Madrid
17	1989	(Spain) Atlético Madrid	–	(Romania) Dinamo București
18	1990	(Spain) Atlético Madrid	3–2	(Socialist Federal Republic of Yugoslavia) Red Star
19	1991	(Italy) Milan	1–1 (p)	(Spain) Atlético Madrid
20	1992	(Spain) Atlético Madrid	2–0	(Brazil) São Paulo
21	1993	(Spain) Atlético Madrid	–	(Brazil) Vasco da Gama
22	1994	(Spain) Atlético Madrid	5–1	(Germany) 1. FC Köln
23	1995	(Spain) Atlético Madrid	3–1	(Argentina) Newell's Old Boys
24	1996	(Spain) Atlético Madrid	5–0	(Socialist Federal Republic of Yugoslavia) Red Star
25	1997	(Spain) Atlético Madrid	1–0	(Italy) Inter
26	1998	(Spain) Atlético Madrid	3–0	(Italy) Lazio
27	2000	(Spain) Atlético Madrid	3–1	(Brazil) Flamengo
28	2002	(Italy) Chievo Verona	4–2	(Spain) Atlético Madrid
29 (Note: Named "Centennial Edition")	2003	(Spain) Atlético Madrid	1–0	(Argentina) Boca Juniors

== Titles by club ==
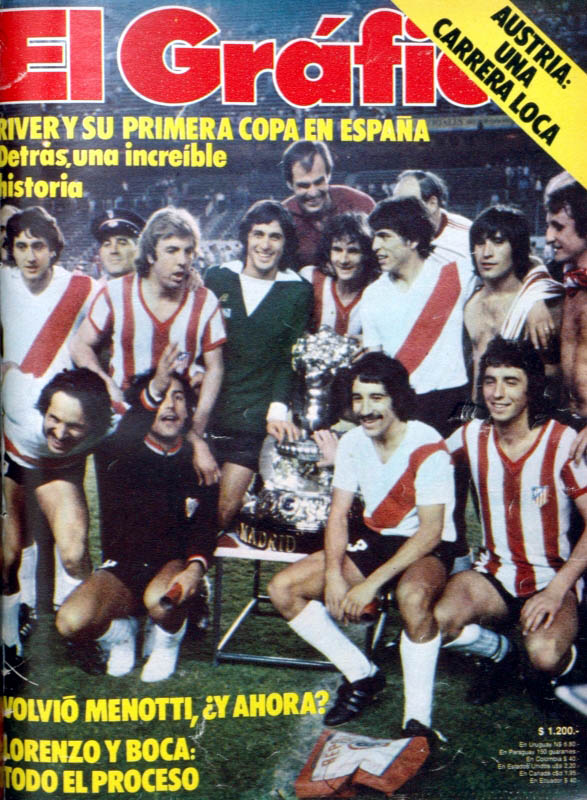
Argentine side River Plate, winners in 1978, covered on El Gráfico magazine

Team	Titles
(Spain) Atlético Madrid	18
(Italy) Milan	3
(Germany) Borussia Dortmund	1
(Italy) Chievo Verona	1
(Argentina) Independiente	1
(England) Liverpool	1
(Germany) Werder Bremen	1
(Netherlands) PSV	1
(Argentina) River Plate	1
(Germany) VfB Stuttgart	1

== Titles by country ==
Country	Titles
Spain	18
Italy	4
Germany	3
Argentina	2
England	1
Netherlands	1
