= Chico Faria =

Portuguese footballer (1949–2004)

Personal information
- Full name: Francisco Delfim Dias Faria
- Date of birth: 9 October 1949
- Place of birth: Matosinhos, Portugal
- Date of death: 10 June 2004 (aged 54)
- Position: Forward

Youth career
- Leixões

Senior career*
Years	Team	Apps	(Gls)
1967–1968	Leixões	20	(3)
1968–1976	Sporting CP	168	(43)
1976–1982	Braga	136	(36)
1982–1983	Penafiel		
1983–1984	Marítimo		
1984–1985	Lourosa		
1985–1986	Ponte da Barca		
Total		334	(82)

International career
1972–1977	Portugal	4	(1)
- * Club domestic league appearances and goals

Francisco Delfim Dias Faria (9 October 1949 – 10 June 2004), commonly known as Chico Faria, was a Portuguese footballer who played as a forward.

== Club career ==
Born in Matosinhos, Faria spent his first 15 seasons as a professional in the Primeira Liga, making his debut in the competition with hometown club Leixões S.C. at only 17. In the 1968 summer, he signed for Sporting Clube de Portugal, where he went on to win two national championships and three Taça de Portugal trophies.

Faria subsequently represented S.C. Braga, equalling a career-best ten goals in the 1979–80 campaign to help his team to the ninth position. From 1982 to 1985, he competed in the Segunda Liga, retiring the following year after a spell in amateur football.

== International career ==
Faria gained four caps for Portugal in five years. He first arrived on 10 May 1972 in a 1–0 away win against Cyprus for the 1974 FIFA World Cup qualifiers, and he scored the only goal in the match played in Nicosia.

Chico Faria: International goals
No.	Date	Venue	Opponent	Score	Result	Competition
1	10 May 1972	GSP Stadium, Nicosia, Cyprus	Cyprus	0–1	0–1	1974 World Cup qualification

== Death ==
Faria died on 10 June 2004 at the age of 54, a victim of prolonged pulmonary disease.
