= Alge =

Alge may refer to:

- Alge, Ethiopia, a town in Alge Sache

== People with the given name ==
- Alge Crumpler (born 1977), American former football tight end
- Alge Gissing (1860–1937), English novelist

== See also ==
- Algae, a group of eukaryotic organisms
- Algea, a Norwegian multinational operating in the chemical industry and man
- Algés (disambiguation)
- Algy, a masculine given name
