= Sciascia =

Sciascia (Italian pronunciation: [ˈʃaʃʃa]) is a Sicilian surname. Notable people with the surname include:

- Filippo Sciascia (born 1972), Italian artist
- Gaylene Sciascia (born 1948), New Zealand choreographer and educator
- Gerlando Sciascia (1934–1999), Italian mobster
- Leonardo Sciascia (1921–1989), Italian writer, novelist, essayist, playwright and politician
- Piri Sciascia (1946–2020), New Zealand Māori leader, kapa haka exponent and university administrator
- Roberto Sciascia (born 1960), Belgian footballer
- Salvatore Sciascia (1919–1986), Italian publisher

== See also ==
- 12380 Sciascia, an asteroid named after Leonardo Sciascia
- Scioscia (disambiguation)
