= 2013 Birthday Honours (New Zealand) =

New Zealand honours list 2013

2013 Queen's Birthday Honours
- Previous: 2013 gallantry awards Next: 2013 bravery awards
- Type: New Zealand royal honours: Order of New Zealand; New Zealand Order of Merit; Queen's Service Order; Queen's Service Medal; New Zealand Antarctic Medal; Distinguished Service Decoration
- Date: 3 June 2013
- Country: New Zealand

Highlights
- Total recipients: 179

The 2013 Queen's Birthday Honours in New Zealand, celebrating the official birthday of Queen Elizabeth II, were appointments made by the Queen in her right as Queen of New Zealand, on the advice of the New Zealand government, to various orders and honours to reward and highlight good works by New Zealanders. They were announced on 3 June 2013.

The recipients of honours are listed here as they were styled before their new honour.

== Order of New Zealand ==
Ordinary member

- Emeritus Professor Albert Wendt CNZM – of Auckland. For services to New Zealand.
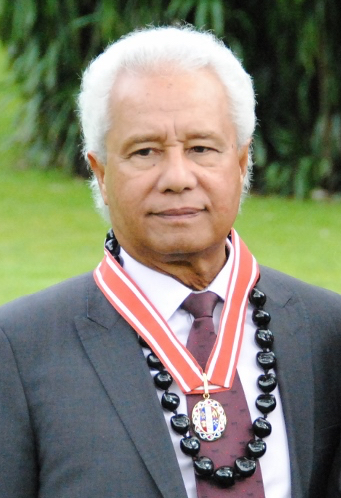
Albert Wendt

== New Zealand Order of Merit ==
=== Dame Companion (DNZM) ===
- Ngāneko Kaihau Minhinnick JP – of Waiuku. For services to Māori and conservation.
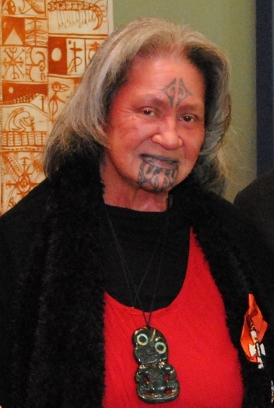
Dame Ngāneko Minhinnick

=== Knight Companion (KNZM) ===
- The Honourable Justice Robert Stanley Chambers QC – of Auckland. For services to the judiciary. (Note: Deceased. Her Majesty's approval of this appointment took effect on 20 May 2013, prior to the date of decease.)
- John Stratton Davies QSO – of Queenstown. For services to business and tourism.
- Dr The Right Honourable Alexander Lockwood Smith – of London, United Kingdom. For services as a member of Parliament and as speaker of the House of Representatives.
- Gordon Frederick Tietjens CNZM – of Tauranga. For services to rugby.
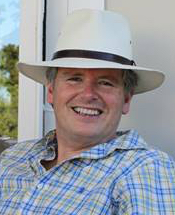
Sir Robert Chambers

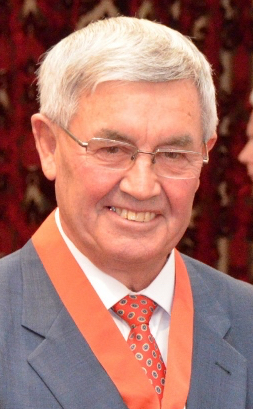
Sir John Davies

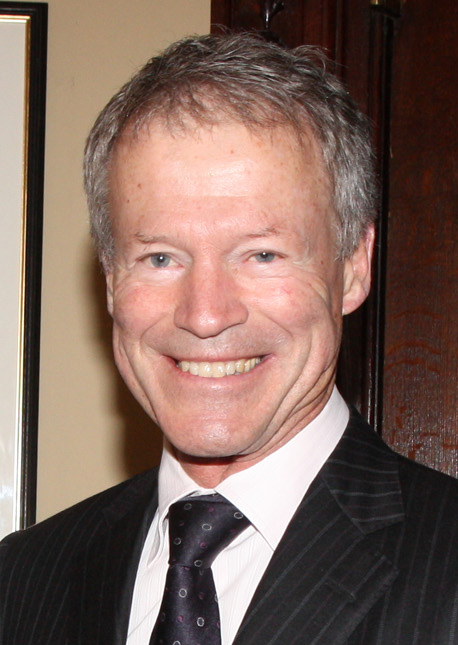
Sir Lockwood Smith

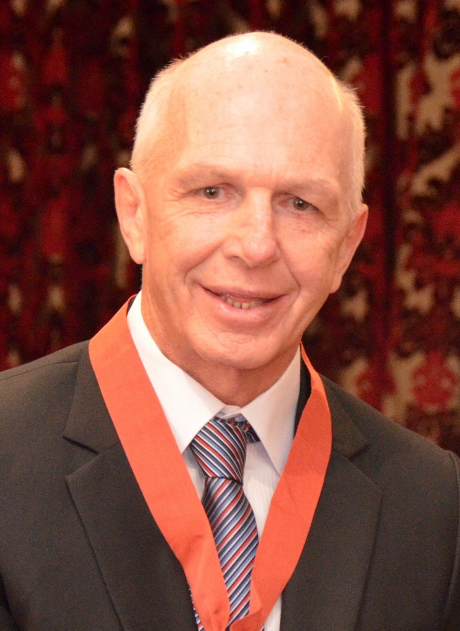
Sir Gordon Tietjens

=== Companion (CNZM) ===
- The Honourable Christopher John Allan – of Auckland. For services to the judiciary.
- Peter Ronald Francis Biggs – of Melbourne, Australia. For services to arts governance and philanthropy.
- William Bernard Boyd QSO – of Auckland. For services to Rotary International.
- Craig Leonard Heatley – of Auckland. For services to business.
- Dr Murray James Horn – of New Plymouth. For services to business and health.
- Hamish Henry Cordy Keith OBE – of Auckland. For services to the arts.
- John Klaricich QSO – of Ōmāpere. For services to Māori and the community.
- Ian Duncan McKinnon QSO JP – of Wellington. For services to education and the community.
- Kevin John Roberts – of Auckland. For services to business and the community.
- Deirdre Elizabeth Anne Tarrant MNZM – of Wellington. For services to contemporary dance.
- Bryan George Williams MBE – of Auckland. For services to rugby.
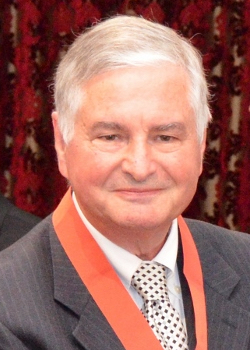
Christopher Allan

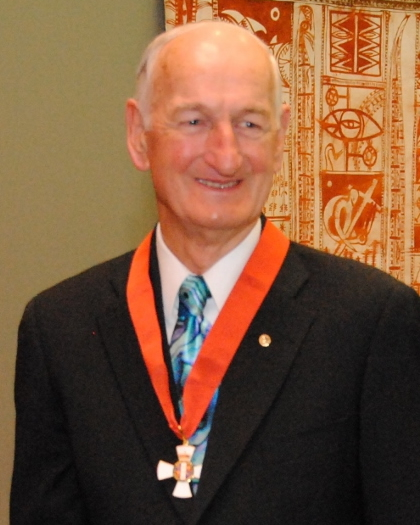
Bill Boyd

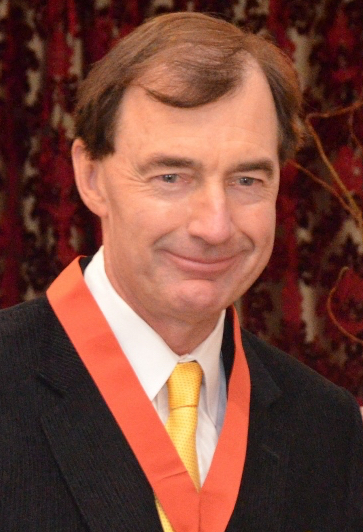
Craig Heatley

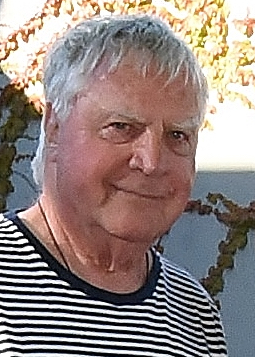
Hamish Keith

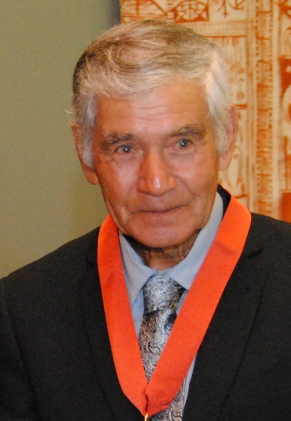
John Klaricich

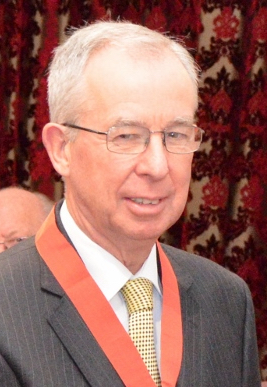
Ian McKinnon

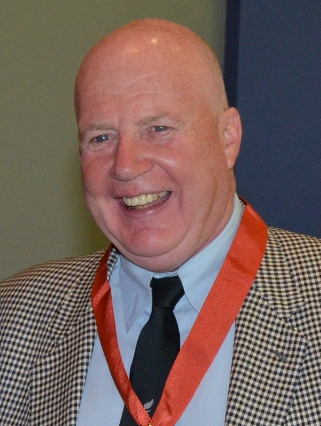
Kevin Roberts

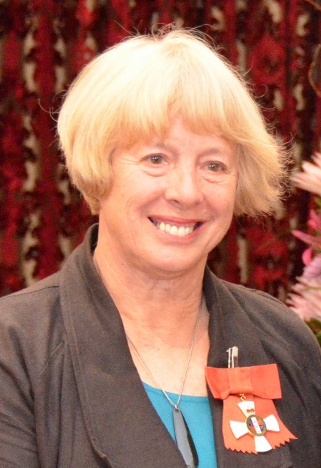
Deirdre Tarrant

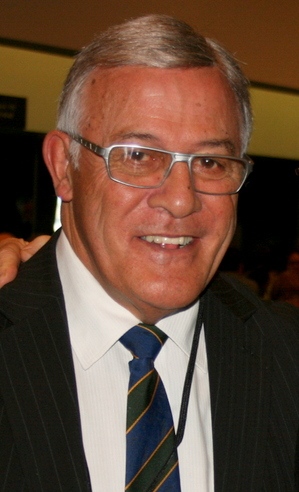
Bryan Williams

=== Officer (ONZM) ===
- John Adshead JP – of Tauranga. For services to football.
- Ross Albert Keithton Bragg – of Auckland. For services to swimming.
- Emeritus Professor John Frederick Burrows QC – of Christchurch. For services to law and education.
- Professor John Charles Butcher – of Auckland. For services to mathematics.
- Graham Coe – of Pukekohe. For services to the construction industry.
- Dr Douglas Charles Edmeades – of Hamilton. For services to agriculture.
- Dr Nigel Thomas Evans – of Auckland. For services to education and the steel industry.
- Neil Lindsay Graham – of Christchurch. For services to business and philanthropy.
- Adrienne Gail Greenwood – of Auckland. For services to sailing.
- David Andrew Irving – of Auckland. For services to business and education.
- Alban Gifford Jackson – of Auckland. For services to design.
- Ulric Vaughan Leon Jones – of Hamilton. For services to the farming industry.
- Penelope Susan Mason – of Waipukurau. For services to the Red Cross.
- Dr Wanda Lee Mathias – of Auckland. For services to health and business.
- Dr Stephen Paul McCormack – of Christchurch. For services to community health.
- Graeme Roderick Milne – of Cambridge. For services to health and the dairy industry.
- Associate Professor David Perez – of Dunedin. For services to oncology.
- Dr John Oliver Crompton Phillips – of Wellington. For services to historical research and publishing.
- Dawn Jane Sanders QSM – of Wellington. For services to theatre.
- Professor Piri John Sciascia – of Porirua. For services to Māori arts.
- John Bruce Tavendale – of Ashburton. For services to agribusiness.
- Norman John Thompson – of Auckland. For services to business and tourism.
- John Culyer Wigglesworth – of Auckland. For services to art, waterskiing and the community.
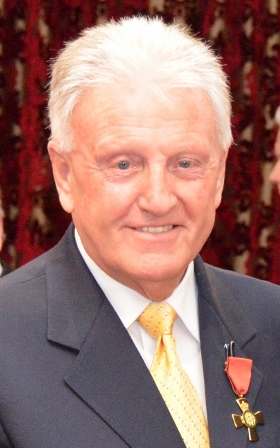
John Adshead

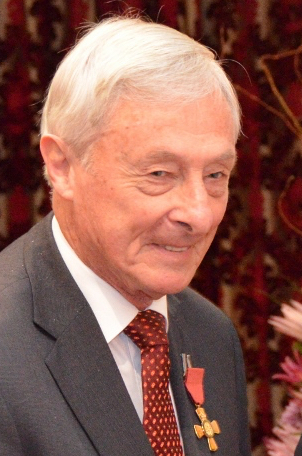
John Burrows

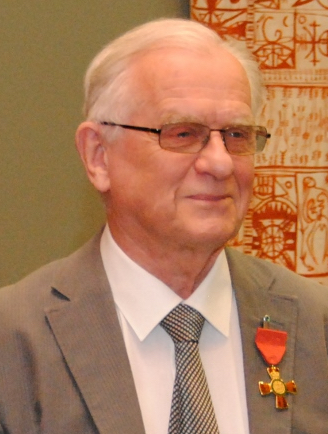
John Butcher

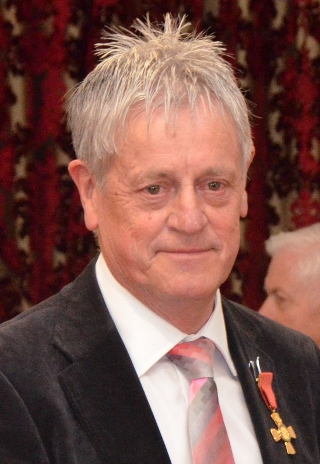
Doug Edmeades

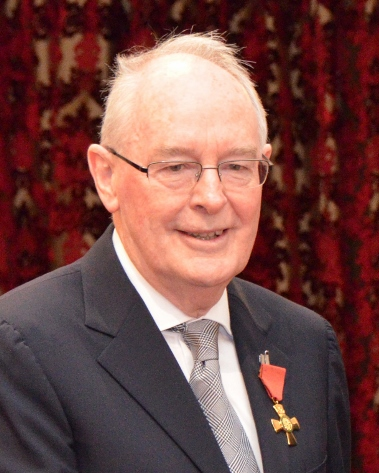
David Irving

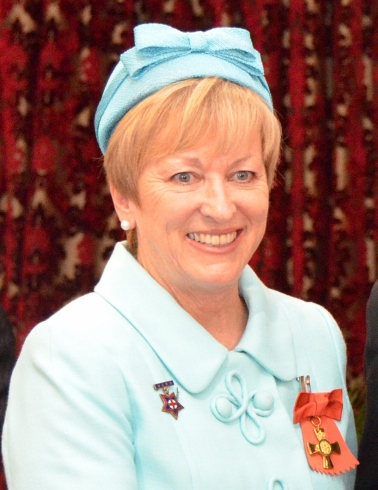
Lee Mathias

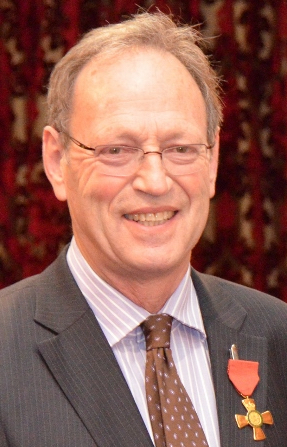
Jock Phillips

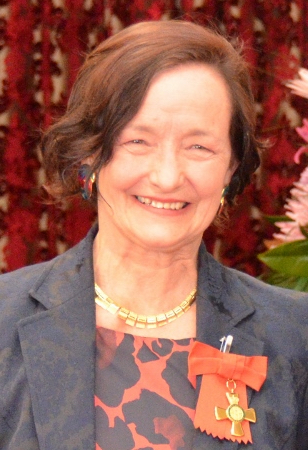
Dawn Sanders

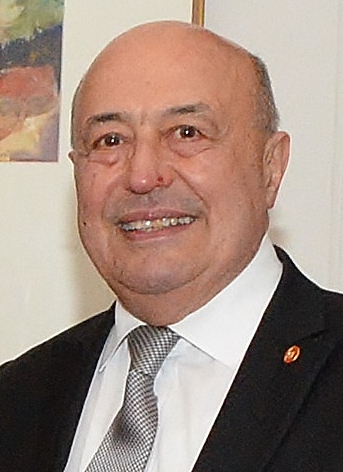
Piri Sciascia

=== Member (MNZM) ===
- Garth Barfoot – of Auckland. For services to business, sport and the community.
- Julie Bartlett – of Auckland. For services to people with disabilities.
- Patricia Marion Barwick – of Christchurch. For services to sport.
- Donald Bogie – of Christchurch. For services to Land Search and Rescue.
- Dr Robert Ellison Brockie – of Waikanae. For services to science and cartooning.
- Warwick Miles Brown – of Auckland. For services to the arts.
- Professor Carl David Burgess – of Wellington. For services to pharmacology.
- Geoffrey Edward Burgess – of Auckland. For services to education.
- Joseph Gordon Butterfield – of Timaru. For services to health and the transport industry.
- Dr Carolyn Ann Coggan – of Auckland. For services to health.
- Glenn Michael James Common – of Nelson. For services to the music industry.
- Ross Philip Dallow JP – of Auckland. For services to the community.
- Jennifer Gael Donoghue – of Palmerston North. For services to the pharmaceutical profession.
- Sergeant Dene Duthie – of Auckland. For services to the New Zealand Police and Search and Rescue.
- Robert Mingi Elliott – of Te Awamutu. For services to Māori and mental health services.
- Eric John Faesenkloet – of Auckland. For services to business, golf and the community.
- Dr Kaiwan Gan – of Christchurch. For services to education and New Zealand–China relations.
- Captain Craig Fraser Harris – of Auckland. For services to the cruise industry.
- Zhiyun He – of Auckland. For services to film and the Chinese community.
- Elizabeth Clare Kerr – of Waikanae. For services to music.
- David Rutherford Kershaw JP – of Martinborough. For services to business and the community.
- Susan Margaret Matthews – of Te Puke. For services to health.
- Hugh Morton McCarroll – of Whangamatā. For services to shearing sports and agriculture.
- Cameron Wylie McGregor – of Auckland. For services to rugby league.
- Helen Medlyn – of Auckland. For services to the performing arts.
- Graeme Albert Nind JP – of Timaru. For services to the community.
- William Neil Plimmer – of Wellington. For services to the arts.
- Craig Potton – of Nelson. For services to photography and conservation.
- Corinne Pritchard – of Auckland. For services to hockey.
- Peter Barton Rainey – of Nelson. For services to the music industry.
- Samantha Jane Scott – of Auckland. For services to theatre.
- Dr Mansoor Shafi – of Wellington. For services to wireless communication technologies.
- Senior Constable Philip MacDonald Simmonds – of Christchurch. For services to the New Zealand Police and Search and Rescue.
- Morvin Te Anatipa Simon – of Whanganui. For services to Māori.
- Vivian Joyce Smith – of Mount Maunganui. For services to chess.
- Senior Sergeant Gordon John Spite – of Christchurch. For services to the New Zealand Police and the community.
- Dr Simon Robert Stables – of Auckland. For services to disaster victim identification.
- John Hector Steffens – of Te Anau. For services to the fishing industry.
- Darryl Maurice Stevens – of Wellington. For services to youth and the Commonwealth.
- Debra Marie Stewart – of Rotorua. For services to bird of prey conservation.
- Phillip James Sunderland – of Palmerston North. For services to health and education.
- Darrin Arthur Sykes JP – of Wellington. For services to touch rugby administration.
- Garry Frederick Trinder – of Wellington. For services to dance.
- Basil John Wakelin – of Wellington. For services to engineering education.
- David Thomas Wardell – of Auckland. For services to education.

Honorary

- His Excellency Sheikh Abdul Raouf Abu Zinadah – of Jeddah, Kingdom of Saudi Arabia. For services to New Zealand–Saudi Arabia relations.
- His Excellency Dr Hamed Abdullah Nasser Al-Riyami – of Muscat, Sultanate of Oman. For services to New Zealand–Oman relations.
- Naoya Kakizoe – of Tokyo, Japan. For services to New Zealand–Japan relations.
- Antonio Volta – of Barcelona, Spain. For services to New Zealand–Spain relations.
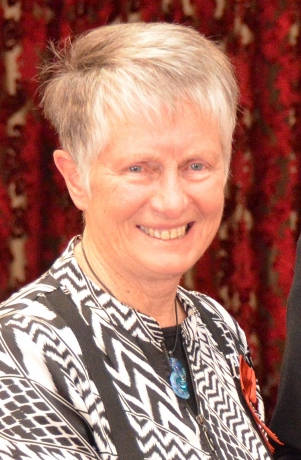
Pat Barwick

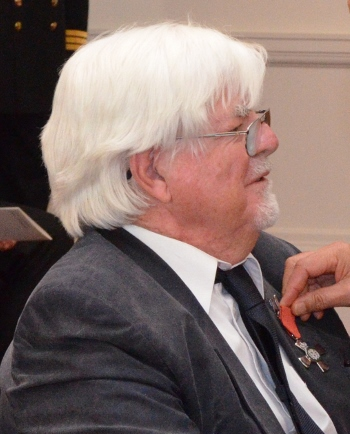
Bob Brockie

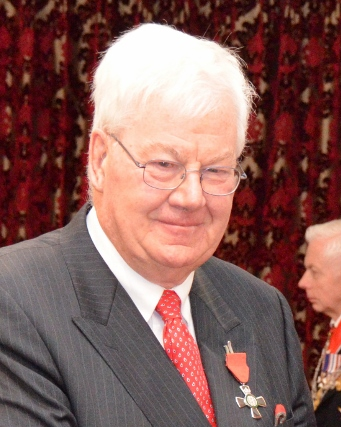
Joe Butterfield

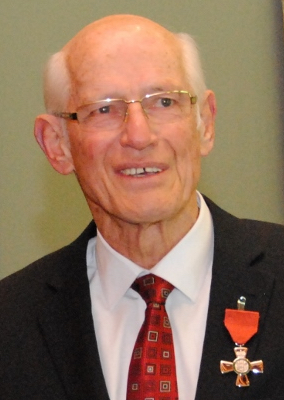
Ross Dallow

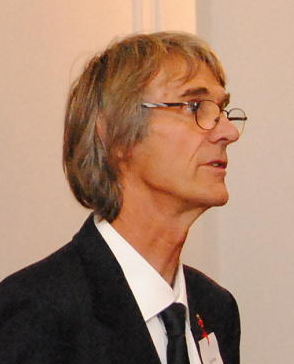
Craig Potton

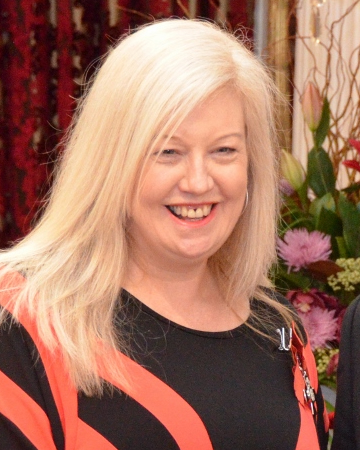
Samantha Scott

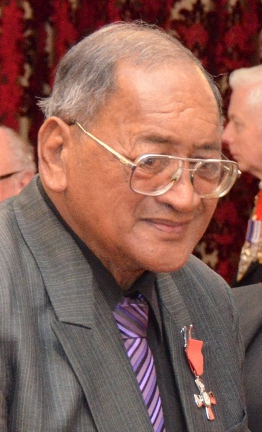
Morvin Simon

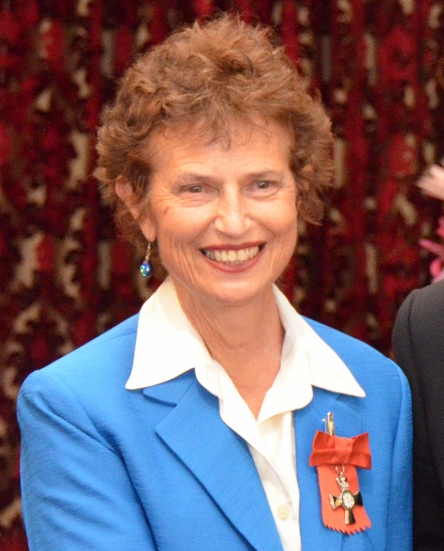
Vivian Smith

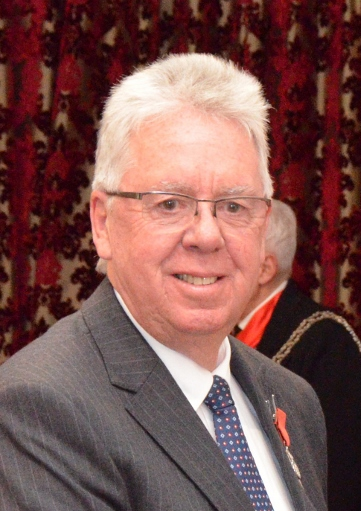
Phil Sunderland

== Companion of the Queen's Service Order (QSO) ==
- Christopher Hugh Blake – of Wellington. For services to the State.
- Judge John Russell Callander – of Auckland. For services to the judiciary.
- Alice Te Awa Hudson – of Auckland. For services to Māori and the community.
- Judge Graeme Roderick Joyce QC – of Auckland. For services to the judiciary.
- John Walter McKinnon – of Wellington. For services to the State.
- John Stewart Ombler – of Wellington. For services to the State.
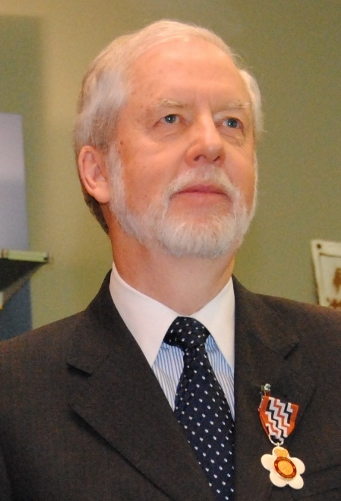
Roderick Joyce

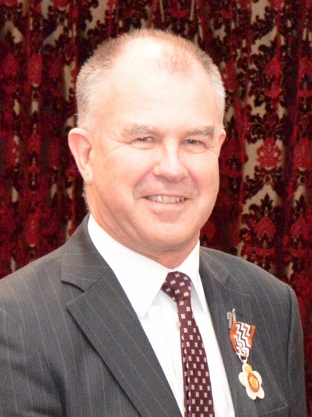
John McKinnon

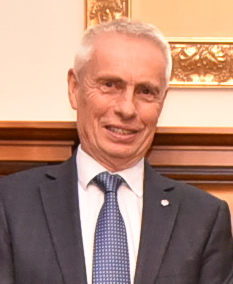
John Ombler

== Queen's Service Medal (QSM) ==
- Ailsa Merle Aiken – of Whanganui. For services to the community.
- Mihi Lydia Angell – of Auckland. For services to Māori and the community.
- Kathleen Elizabeth Barnett – of Nelson. For services to music.
- Eric Andrew Batten – of Wellington. For services to the community.
- Marlene Caroline Batten – of Wellington. For services to the community.
- Muhammud Zayd Ian Blissett JP – of Blenheim. For services to the community.
- Astrid Christine Brocklehurst – of Bluff. For services to the community.
- David James Broughton – of Christchurch. For services to the community.
- Tui Eileen Brown – of Christchurch. For services to senior citizens and the community.
- Marie Eda Burgess – of Gisborne. For services to nursing and the community.
- Ronald Talbert Cain – of Dunedin. For services to athletics.
- Phillip Lawrence Campbell – of Rotorua. For services to sport and journalism.
- Robert John Campbell – of Fairlie. For services to pipe bands and the community.
- Barbara Anne Clarke – of Gisborne. For services to health, business and the community.
- Charles Alexander Fitzgerald Ransfield Cooke JP – of Mangawhai. For services to the Royal New Zealand Returned and Services' Association.
- Philip Richard Cross – of Kaitaia. For services to the community.
- Sharon Faye Davies – of Auckland. For services to the community.
- Phroso Dometakis-Bell – of Wellington. For services to the community.
- Albert George Duckmanton – of Christchurch. For services to sport.
- Brian Joseph Edwards – of Auckland. For services to the New Zealand Fire Service.
- Jean Stewart Gould – of Christchurch. For services to sport and the community.
- James Andrew Hassall – of Putāruru. For services to the community.
- Neil Joseph Hatcher JP – of Hastings. For services to the community.
- Maurice Desmond Hayes – of Auckland. For services to philanthropy and aviation.
- Beverly Winifred Hayman – of Tauranga. For services to the community.
- Karen Jane Howard – of Te Awamutu. For services to girl guiding.
- Trevor Hapi Howse – of Christchurch. For services to Māori and conservation.
- Lance Gregory Hutchison JP – of Auckland. For services to the community.
- Kevin Graeme Kalff – of Napier. For services to the New Zealand Police and the community.
- Lillian Winifred Kershaw – of Hamilton. For services to music.
- Perry Gray Keyte – of Tauranga. For services to the community.
- Margaret Caroline King – of Auckland. For services to the community.
- John Motunau Katene Kopa – of Hamilton. For services to Māori.
- Roger Ewen Laloli JP – of Auckland. For services to the community.
- Francis Ian Levien – of Papakura. For services to brass bands.
- Chakara Lim – of Auckland. For services to the Cambodian community.
- Sue Peng Lim – of Auckland. For services to health and the Asian community.
- Janet Maree Lucas – of Wellington. For services to education.
- Alister Fitzgerald Macalister – of Wellington. For services to the blind.
- Robert Houston Mayo – of Wellington. For services to the community.
- John Ronald McDermott – of Dunedin. For services as a reporter.
- Helen Margaret McKay – of Tuatapere. For services to the community.
- Ross McKinnon – of Lower Hutt. For services to the community.
- Ian Colin McLaren JP – of Wellington. For services to foster care.
- Raewyn Beryl McLaren – of Wellington. For services to foster care.
- Barry Fairbairn McLean – of Gisborne. For services to surf life saving.
- Stephanie Alison McMillan JP – of Whangārei. For services to the community.
- Dr Christopher John Milne – of Hamilton. For services to sports medicine.
- Mary Clare Mouat – of Christchurch. For services to mental health.
- James Arthur Newman JP – of Orewa. For services to veterans and business.
- Delphine Anne Parker JP – of Sanson. For services to the community.
- Lynette Kaye Parker – of Queenstown. For services to tourism and children's health.
- Heather Ngaire Paterson – of Gore. For services to fashion.
- John Robertson Patterson – of Christchurch. For services to senior citizens.
- Brian Leslie Poole – of Wellington. For services to health and the community.
- Lynette Te Manawa Adrienne Roa – of Reefton. For services to the community.
- Ani Kanara Rolfe – of Rotorua. For services to senior citizens and the community.
- Kathleen Scott – of Palmerston North. For services to people with diabetes.
- Titikura Kipo Irimana Simon – of Whanganui. For services to Māori.
- Manmohan Singh – of Auckland. For services to the Indian community.
- Barbara Dorothy Smith – of Hamilton. For services to music.
- Robert Leslie Thomas – of Levin. For services to the community.
- Susanne Margaret Thorp – of New Plymouth. For services to equestrian sport.
- George Walter Ward JP – of Ashburton. For services to agriculture and the community.
- Barbara Emilene Watene – of Lower Hutt. For services to foster care.
- Jean Allan Newsham West – of Auckland. For services to the community.
- Peter John Wheeler – of Auckland. For services to Air Force veterans.
- Joan Catherine Whelan – of Whanganui. For services to music.
- Jane Elizabeth Shield Wilson – of Dunedin. For services to the community.
- Jean Wilson – of Blenheim. For services to senior citizens and the community.
- Rodney James Wise – of Hamilton. For services to the community.
- David John Withers JP – of Wairoa. For services to Land Search and Rescue and the community.
- Eva Rita Wright JP – of Dannevirke. For services to the community.

Honorary

- Herbert Ingham Jones – of Eketāhuna. For services to conservation and music.
- Sione Tupukauvalu Liava'a – of Auckland. For services to the Tongan community.
- Hans-Heinrich Meyer – of Bad Fallingbostel, Germany. For services to New Zealand–Germany relations.
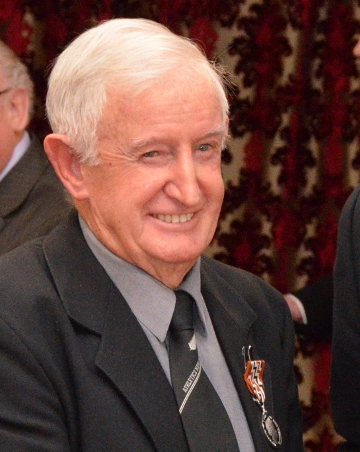
Ron Cain

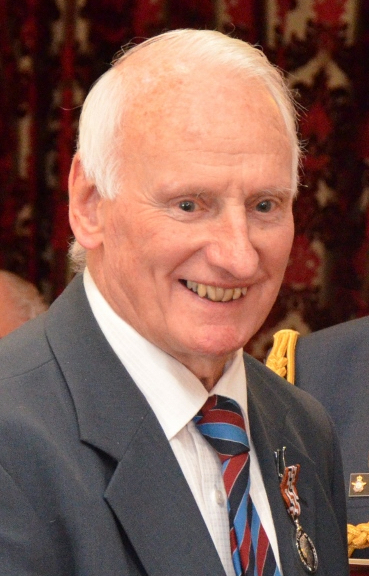
Alby Duckmanton

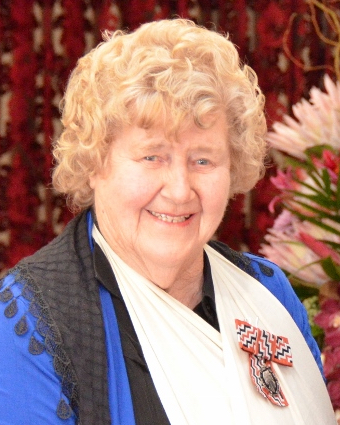
Jean Gould

Neil Hatcher

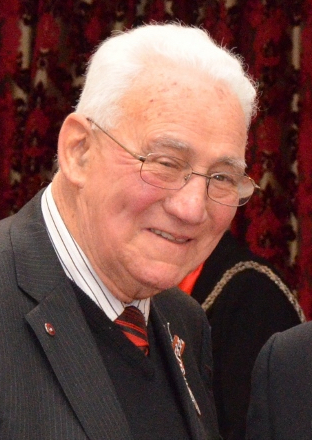
Trevor Howse

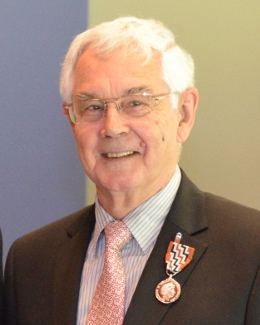
Roger Laloli

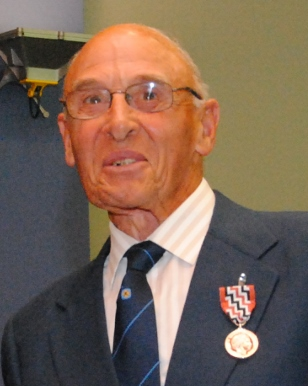
Barry McLean

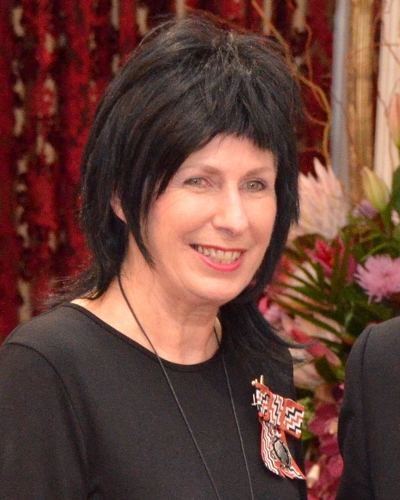
Heather Paterson

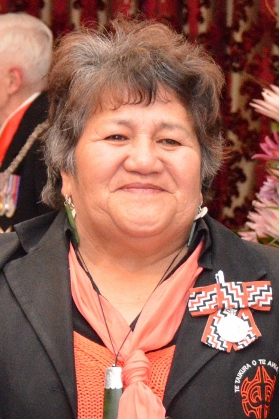
Titikura Simon

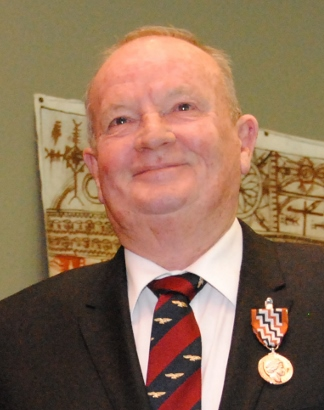
Peter Wheeler

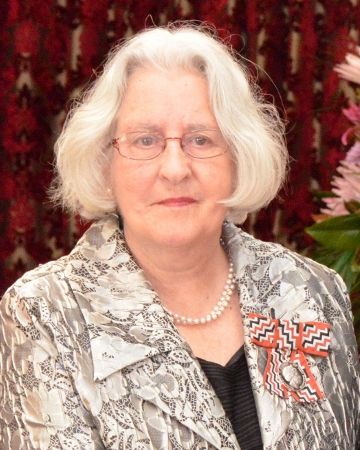
Jean Wilson

== New Zealand Antarctic Medal (NZAM) ==
- Professor Thomas George Allan Green – of Hamilton. For services to Antarctic science.
- Baden Nolan Norris QSO – of Christchurch. For services to Antarctic history and conservation.
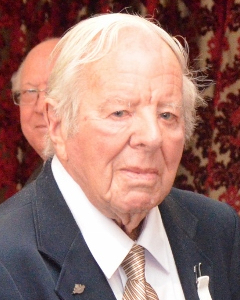
Baden Norris

== New Zealand Distinguished Service Decoration (DSD) ==
- Warrant Officer James Ernist Harper – of Auckland. For services to the New Zealand Defence Force.
- Lieutenant Colonel Robin Michael Hoult – of Christchurch. For services to the New Zealand Defence Force.
- Lieutenant Colonel Stefan John Michie – of Canberra, Australia. For services to the New Zealand Defence Force.
- Sergeant Lindsay Norriss – of Blenheim. For services to the New Zealand Defence Force.
- Major Brent John Quin – of Upper Hutt. For services to the New Zealand Defence Force.
- Petty Officer Scott Matthew Treleaven – of Auckland. For services to the New Zealand Defence Force.
