= Algés =

Algés may refer to:

- Algés (Oeiras), a former parish in Oeiras, Portugal
- Algés, Linda-a-Velha e Cruz Quebrada-Dafundo, a current parish in Oeiras, Portugal
- Algés River, a river in Algés Parish, Portugal
- U.D.R. Algés, a football club that plays in Algés Parish
