= Minhinnick =

Minhinnick is a surname. Notable people with the surname include:

- Gordon Minhinnick (1902−1992), New Zealand cartoonist
- Ngāneko Minhinnick (1939–2017), New Zealand Māori leader
- Robert Minhinnick (born 1952), Welsh poet and translator
