= Algea =

Algea may refer to:

- Algea (company), a Norwegian multinational chemical manufacturing company
- Algea (mythology), personifications of pain in Greek mythology
