= Doug Edmeades =

Soil scientist

Doug Edmeades ONZM
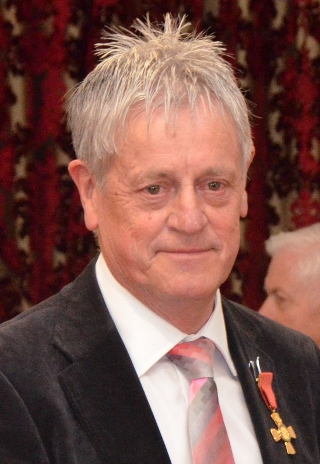
- Edmeades in 2013
- Born: Douglas Charles Edmeades; 1949 (age 76–77); Hamilton, New Zealand
- Education: Lincoln University / University of Canterbury
- Scientific career
- Fields: Soil Science
- Thesis: The measurement of symbiotic nitrogen fixation in established pastures and some aspects of the nitrogen cycle in a sequence of pastures of increasing age (1976)

Douglas Charles Edmeades ONZM (born 1949) is a New Zealand soil scientist. He was involved in high-profile litigation in relation to the effectiveness of the Maxicrop brand of fertiliser.

== Early life ==
Edmeades was born in 1949. Robert Harvey (1914–1985) and Ina (née Fitness, 1917–2011) were his parents. The educationalist Cliff Edmeades is one of his elder brothers.

== Academic career ==
After a Ph.D. from Lincoln College (awarded in 1976 through Canterbury University due to Lincoln's status at the time) Edmeades worked for the Ministry of Agriculture and Fisheries at Ruakura and then AgResearch after the 1992 reorganisation which created Crown Research Institutes. He left in 1996 and now runs his own consultancy, agKnowledge Ltd.

In the 2013 Queen's Birthday Honours, Edmeades was appointed an Officer of the New Zealand Order of Merit, for services to agriculture.

== Litigation ==
In 1989, while working for the Ministry of Agriculture and Fisheries, Edmeades appeared on the TV show FairGo expressing the view that seaweed-based Maxicrop didn't work. Legal action was initiated by Maxicrop's New Zealand distributor, the Bell-Booth Group. In Bell-Booth Group Ltd v Attorney-General the Court of Appeal found for MAF and FairGo after 'the country's longest civil court case.'

== Selected works ==
Widely cited peer review articles:

- Edmeades, Douglas C. "The long-term effects of manures and fertilisers on soil productivity and quality: a review." Nutrient Cycling in Agroecosystems 66.2 (2003): 165–180.
- Edmeades, D. C., D. M. Wheeler, and O. E. Clinton. "The chemical composition and ionic strength of soil solutions from New Zealand topsoils." Soil Research 23.2 (1985): 151–165.
- Blamey, F. P. C., D. C. Edmeades, and D. M. Wheeler. "Role of root cation‐exchange capacity in differential aluminum tolerance of Lotus species." Journal of Plant Nutrition 13.6 (1990): 729–744.

Books:

- Science friction : the Maxicrop case and the aftermath. ISBN 0473068869
