= Scioscia =

Scioscia (Italian pronunciation: [ˈʃɔʃʃa]) may refer to:

- Scioscia (mountain), mountain in Lombardy, Italy
- Maurizio Scioscia (born 1991), Italian-German footballer
- Mike Scioscia (born 1958), American baseball manager and player

== See also ==
- Sciascia
- Sciuscià
