= Francesco A. Gianninoto =

Industrial designer (1903–1988)

Francesco A. Gianninoto (1903–1988) was an Italian-born American industrial designer.

== Biography ==
Born in Chiaramonte, Sicily, Gianninoto immigrated to New York with his family in 1911. He attended the Ethical Culture School on an art scholarship and graduated in 1922. He initially joined his family's dress manufacturing business, but later joined an advertising agency, BBDO, where he held positions as art director and creative director.

In 1931, Gianninoto founded his own consulting firm, Gianninoto Associates. He also co-founded the Package Design Council and the Industrial Designers Society of America (IDSA), which recognized him as package design pioneer in 1985.

Gianninoto took retirement in 1983. In his later years, Gianninoto built a windmill on his estate in Redding, Connecticut, to generate electricity for a greenhouse.

The IDSA's Gianninoto Graduate Scholarship is named after him.
