= 1968–69 Taça de Portugal =

Tournament details
- Country: Portugal
- Dates: September 1968 – 22 June 1969
- Teams: 95

Final positions
- Champions: Benfica (13th title)
- Runners-up: Académica de Coimbra

Tournament statistics
- Matches played: 138
- Goals scored: 428 (3.1 per match)
- Top goal scorer(s): Eusébio (18 goals)

The 1968–69 Taça de Portugal was the 29th edition of the Taça de Portugal, a Portuguese football knockout tournament organized by the Portuguese Football Federation (FPF). It began in September 1968. The final was played on 22 June 1969 at the Estádio Nacional.

Porto were the previous holders, having defeated Vitória de Setúbal 2–1 in the previous season's final. Defending champions Porto were unable to regain the Taça de Portugal as they were defeated in the fourth round by eventual winners Benfica, who went on to defeat Académica de Coimbra in the final and claim their thirteenth Taça de Portugal.

== First round ==
Teams from the Segunda Divisão (II) and the Terceira Divisão (III) entered at this stage. Due to the expansion of third-tier teams being able to participate in the competition, two legged first round cup ties were scrapped. First round ties which ended in a draw, were replayed at a later date.

Home team	Score	Away team
Alhandra (II)	2 – 2	Odivelas (III)
Barreirense (II)	4 – 0	Oliveirense (III)
Beira-Mar (II)	3 – 2	União de Coimbra (III)
Celoricense (III)	1 – 0	Mortágua (III)
Desportivo das Aves (III)	2 – 2	Torres Novas (II)
Desportivo de Beja (III)	2 – 2	Gil Vicente (III)
Estrela de Portalegre (III)	0 – 0	Almada (II)
Fafe (III)	2 – 0	Oriental (II)
Famalicão (II)	2 – 1	Académico de Viseu (II)
Farense (III)	2 – 1	Salgueiros (II)
Feirense (III)	1 – 0	São Pedro da Cova (II)
Ferroviários (III)	3 – 1	União de Montemor (III)
Guarda (III)	1 – 0	Seixal (II)
Juventude de Évora (III)	3 – 1	Casa Pia (III)
Leões Santarém (II)	1 – 0	Marialvas (III)
Lusitano de Évora (II)	5 – 0	Faro e Benfica (III)
Marinhense (III)	1 – 0	Gouveia (II)
Montijo (II)	1 – 0	Cova da Piedade (III)
Naval (III)	0 – 0	Bragança (III)

Home team	Score	Away team
Nazarenos (III)	5 – 0	Aljustrelense (III)
O Grandolense (III)	1 – 0	Sporting de Lamego (III)
Olhanense (III)	2 – 0	Sporting de Espinho (II)
Penafiel (II)	1 – 1	Leça (II)
Peniche (II)	3 – 1	Lusitano VRSA (III)
Portimonense (II)	1 – 0	Sesimbra (II)
Sacavenense (III)	1 – 0	Chaves (III)
Sintrense (II)	2 – 0	Torreense (II)
Sporting da Covilhã (II)	6 – 0	Pinhelenses (III)
Tirsense (II)	1 – 1	Riopele (III)
Tramagal (II)	5 – 0	Desportivo de Castelo Branco (III)
União de Algés (III)	3 – 3	Sarilhense (III)
União de Almeirim (III)	2 – 0	Lusitano FCV (III)
União de Lamas (III)	2 – 0	Luso (II)
União de Leiria (III)	5 – 1	Lusitânia Lourosa (III)
Vasco da Gama Sines (III)	4 – 0	Rio Ave (III)
Vianense (III)	2 – 1	Boavista (II)
Vila Real (III)	4 – 0	Mirandela (III)
Vizela (III)	2 – 0	Valecambrense (II)

=== Replays ===
Home team	Score	Away team
Alhandra (II)	2 – 1	Odivelas (III)
Desportivo das Aves (III)	3 – 0	Torres Novas (II)
Desportivo de Beja (III)	2 – 1	Gil Vicente (III)
Estrela de Portalegre (III)	2 – 1	Almada (II)

Home team	Score	Away team
Naval (III)	4 – 1	Bragança (III)
Penafiel (II)	1 – 0	Leça (II)
Riopele (III)	1 – 4	Tirsense (II)
União de Algés (III)	2 – 1	Sarilhense (III)

== Second round ==
Home team	Score	Away team
Barreirense (II)	3 – 0	Alhandra (III)
Beira-Mar (II)	2 – 0	Sporting da Covilhã (II)
Celoricense (III)	1 – 2	Vizela (III)
Desportivo das Aves (III)	2 – 0	Vianense (III)
Desportivo de Beja (III)	4 – 2	União de Algés (III)
Fafe (III)	0 – 0	União de Lamas (III)
Famalicão (II)	3 – 1	Vasco da Gama Sines (III)
Farense (III)	2 – 0	Ferroviários (III)
Feirense (III)	2 – 0	Estrela de Portalegre (III)
Guarda (III)	0 – 3	Tirsense (II)

Home team	Score	Away team
Lusitano de Évora (II)	1 – 0	Nazarenos (III)
Montijo (II)	2 – 1	Sintrense (II)
Olhanense (III)	3 – 0	Juventude de Évora (III)
Portimonense (II)	0 – 2	O Grandolense (III)
Sacavenense (III)	2 – 0	Marinhense (III)
Tramagal (II)	2 – 0	Naval (III)
União de Almeirim (III)	2 – 1	Leões Santarém (II)
União de Leiria (III)	3 – 0	Penafiel (II)
Vila Real (III)	0 – 1	Peniche (II)

=== Replays ===
Home team	Score	Away team
União de Lamas (III)	4 – 0	Fafe (III)

== Third round ==
Due to a lack of teams involved in the fourth round, the organizing body of the competition, the Portuguese Football Federation (FPF), decided to have an additional round where the teams who lost their second round ties would be given a second opportunity to progress to the next round of the competition.

Home team	Score	Away team
Alhandra (III)	2 – 2	União de Algés (III)
Estrela de Portalegre (III)	2 – 0	Guarda (III)
Fafe (III)	2 – 1	Naval (III)
Ferroviários (III)	2 – 0	Juventude de Évora (III)
Marinhense (III)	3 – 0	Portimonense (II)

Home team	Score	Away team
Nazarenos (III)	4 – 1	Vila Real (III)
Penafiel (II)	0 – 0	Leões Santarém (II)
Vasco da Gama Sines (III)	1 – 2	Sintrense (II)
Vianense (III)	5 – 0	Celoricense (III)

=== Replays ===
Home team	Score	Away team
Alhandra (III)	3 – 0	União de Algés (III)

Home team	Score	Away team
Penafiel (II)	0 – 1	Leões Santarém (II)

== Fourth round ==
Ties were played on 9 February. Teams from the Primeira Liga (I) entered at this stage.

Home team	Score	Away team
Académica de Coimbra (I)	2 – 0	Farense (III)
Atlético CP (I)	3 – 1	Braga (I)
Beira-Mar (II)	2 – 4	Varzim (I)
Belenenses (I)	1 – 0	Sacavenense (III)
Benfica (I)	8 – 0	União de Almeirim (III)
Desportivo das Aves (III)	0 – 2	Sporting CP (I)
Desportivo de Beja (III)	1 – 0	Vianense (III)
Estrela de Portalegre (III)	0 – 2	Leões Santarém (II)
Feirense (III)	0 – 2	Sanjoanense (I)
Ferroviários (III)	0 – 1	Vizela (III)
Leixões (I)	6 – 1	Alhandra (III)

Home team	Score	Away team
Montijo (II)	1 – 4	Vitória de Setúbal (I)
Nazarenos (III)	2 – 0	Lusitano de Évora (II)
Olhanense (III)	1 – 0	Tramagal (II)
Peniche (II)	1 – 1	Vitória de Guimarães (I)
Porto (I)	3 – 0	Fafe (III)
Sintrense (II)	1 – 2	Famalicão (II)
Tirsense (II)	2 – 1	Marinhense (III)
União de Lamas (III)	0 – 1	Fabril Barreiro (I)
União de Leiria (III)	0 – 1	Barreirense (II)
União de Tomar (I)	3 – 0	O Grandolense (III)

=== Replays ===
Home team	Score	Away team
Vitória de Guimarães (I)	4 – 0	Peniche (II)

== Fifth round ==
Ties were played on 9 March. Due to the odd number of teams involved at this stage of the competition, Sporting CP qualified for the next round due to having no opponent to face at this stage of the competition.

Home team	Score	Away team
Barreirense (II)	3 – 2	Atlético CP (I)
Benfica (I)	3 – 0	Porto (I)
Desportivo de Beja (III)	0 – 4	União de Tomar (I)
Fabril Barreiro (I)	4 – 2	Nazarenos (III)
Leixões (I)	1 – 0	Olhanense (III)

Home team	Score	Away team
Leões Santarém (II)	1 – 6	Académica de Coimbra (I)
Tirsense (II)	2 – 0	Sanjoanense (I)
Varzim (I)	3 – 0	Famalicão (II)
Vitória de Setúbal (I)	2 – 3	Belenenses (I)
Vizela (II)	1 – 5	Vitória de Guimarães (I)

== Sixth round ==
Ties were played between the 10–17 May. Club sides Atlético Luanda, Ferroviário Lourenço Marques, Lusitânia, União da Madeira and União de Bissau were invited to participate in the competition.

Team 1	Agg.	Team 2	1st leg	2nd leg
Académica de Coimbra (I)	5 – 1	Ferroviário Lourenço Marques (N/A)	4 – 1	1 – 0
Atlético Luanda (N/A)	2 – 7	Benfica (I)	0 – 4	2 – 3
Fabril Barreiro (I)	10 – 0	União da Madeira (N/A)	7 – 0	3 – 0
Leixões (I)	1 – 2	Barreirense (II)	1 – 0	0 – 2
Lusitânia (N/A)	0 – 9	Belenenses (I)	0 – 5	0 – 4
Sporting CP (I)	17 – 1	União de Bissau (N/A)	5 – 1	12 – 0
Tirsense (II)	1 – 2	União de Tomar (I)	1 – 2	0 – 0
Varzim (I)	4 – 6	Vitória de Guimarães (I)	2 – 3	2 – 3

== Quarter-finals ==
Ties were played between the 25 May and the 1 June.

Team 1	Agg.	Team 2	1st leg	2nd leg
Belenenses (I)	2 – 3	Benfica (I)	0 – 1	2 – 2
Fabril Barreiro (I)	3 – 2	Barreirense (II)	3 – 0	0 – 2
Sporting CP (I)	3 – 0	União de Tomar (I)	2 – 0	1 – 0
Vitória de Guimarães (I)	2 – 6	Académica de Coimbra (I)	2 – 1	0 – 5

== Semi-finals ==
Ties were played between the 8–15 June.

Team 1	Agg.	Team 2	1st leg	2nd leg
Benfica (I)	7 – 3	Fabril Barreiro (I)	5 – 1	2 – 2
Sporting CP (I)	1 – 3	Académica de Coimbra (I)	1 – 2	0 – 1

== Final ==
22 June 1969

Académica de Coimbra	1 – 2 (a.e.t.)	Benfica
António 1'	(Report)	Simões 85'; Eusébio 109'

Estádio Nacional, Oeiras
Referee: Ismael Baltazar (Setúbal)
