= Trevor Howse =

New Zealand Māori tribal leader (1931–2017)

Trevor House QSM
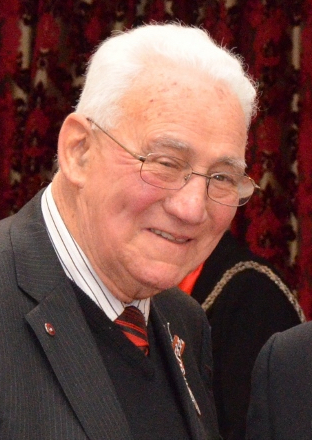
- Howse in 2013
- Born: 24 September 1931; Kaikōura, New Zealand
- Died: 12 May 2017 (aged 85); Christchurch, New Zealand
- Occupation: Ngāi Tahu leader

Trevor Hapi Howse QSM (24 September 1931 – 12 May 2017) was a New Zealand Ngāi Tahu researcher and iwi leader.

== Early life ==
Howse grew in a public works camp before moving with his family to Tuahiwi near Christchurch for tuberculosis treatment for his mother; due to her incapacity, he was largely responsible for his siblings. He attended Rangiora High School where he learnt farming skills. After school he did several jobs, including the freezing works, the railway and shearing, eventually rising up the ranks of a supermarket warehouse.

== Ngāi Tahu leadership ==
Howse's interest in and knowledge of the workings of the Māori Land Court led to a job as a researcher on the Ngāi Tahu claim, one of the first claims before the Waitangi Tribunal. He was also a principal negotiator of the settlement with the Crown that followed. Howse continued Ngāi Tahu roles, including membership of the Ngāi Tahu Māori Trust Board.

Howse was awarded a Queen's Service Medal, for services to Māori and conservation, in the 2013 Queen's Birthday Honours. He died on 12 May 2017 in the Christchurch suburb of St Albans.
