= Bob Brockie =

New Zealand columnist, cartoonist and scientist (1932–2025)

Robert Brockie MNZM
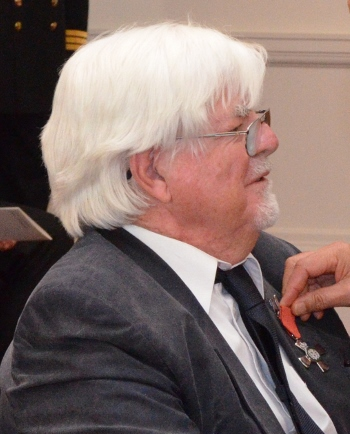
- Brockie in 2013
- Born: Robert Ellison Brockie; 23 April 1932; Christchurch, New Zealand
- Died: 1 May 2025 (aged 93); Paraparaumu, New Zealand
- Occupations: Cartoonist; scientist; columnist
- Years active: 1975–2018
- Relatives: Bob Jones (brother-in-law); Lloyd Jones (brother-in-law)
- Scientific career
- Education: Victoria University of Wellington
- Thesis: Studies on the Hedgehog, Erinaceus europaeus L., in New Zealand (1974)

Robert Ellison Brockie MNZM (23 April 1932 – 1 May 2025) was a New Zealand cartoonist, scientist, columnist and graphic artist.

== Life and career ==
Brockie was an editorial cartoonist for the National Business Review from 1975 to 2018, specialising in political satire. As a biologist, he was interested in animal populations, animal behaviour and diseases and did his PhD on hedgehog ecology. He published material on butterfly evolution in Sicily, behaviour of sparrows, magpies, possums, starlings, mange mites, animal roadkill, flax flowering, cabbage tree disease.

Brockie was science columnist for Wellington's Dominion Post newspaper from 2001 to 2018.

Brockie took a strong interest in refuting popular myths, like danger to humans from 1080 poison used to control possum populations. He was a member of New Zealand Skeptics.

In the 2013 Queen's Birthday Honours, Brockie was appointed a Member of the New Zealand Order of Merit, for services to science and cartooning. He was elected a Companion of the Royal Society of New Zealand, but resigned his companionship in 2022. He was twice named New Zealand Cartoonist of the Year.

In 2018, Brockie was dropped from the Fairfax Media chain and the National Business Review for his positions on the Treaty of Waitangi and climate change.

Brockie died in Paraparaumu on 1 May 2025, at the age of 93. In 2026 a collection of his cartoons from the 1980s to the 2010s were donated by his family to the NZ Cartoon and Comic Archive at Alexander Turnbull Library.

== Selected publications ==
- I was there!: dramatic first-hand accounts from New Zealand’s history
- City Nature: Everyday Plants and Animals in NZ Cities
- Dr Bob's amazing nature facts
- Brockie’s Bones of contention: a selection of cartoons, ISBN 9780473002008
- Brockie, Bob; Mayne, Warren (1983). Brockie's bones of contention: a selection of cartoons. Wellington, N.Z.: Fourth Estate Books. ISBN 9780473002008.
- Don't Vote – It Only Encourages Them
- Brockie, Bob (2002). Brockie, Bob (ed.). The Penguin eyewitness history of New Zealand: dramatic first-hand accounts from New Zealand's history (Updated and extended ed.). Albany, Auckland: Penguin Books. ISBN 9780143018254.
- A Living New Zealand Forest: A Community of Plants and Animals (1992), David Bateman Publishing, ISBN 186953039X, presents results of a 25-year study of the Orongorongo range near Wellington
- Brockie, Bob (2015) Brockie: A Memoir in Words, Cartoons & Sketches. Fraser Books, ISBN 9780958232074
- Brockie, Bob (2026) The evolving story of life : from Darwin to DNA. Masterton: Fraser Books.
