= Palma di Montechiaro =

- Comune
- Comune di Palma di Montechiaro
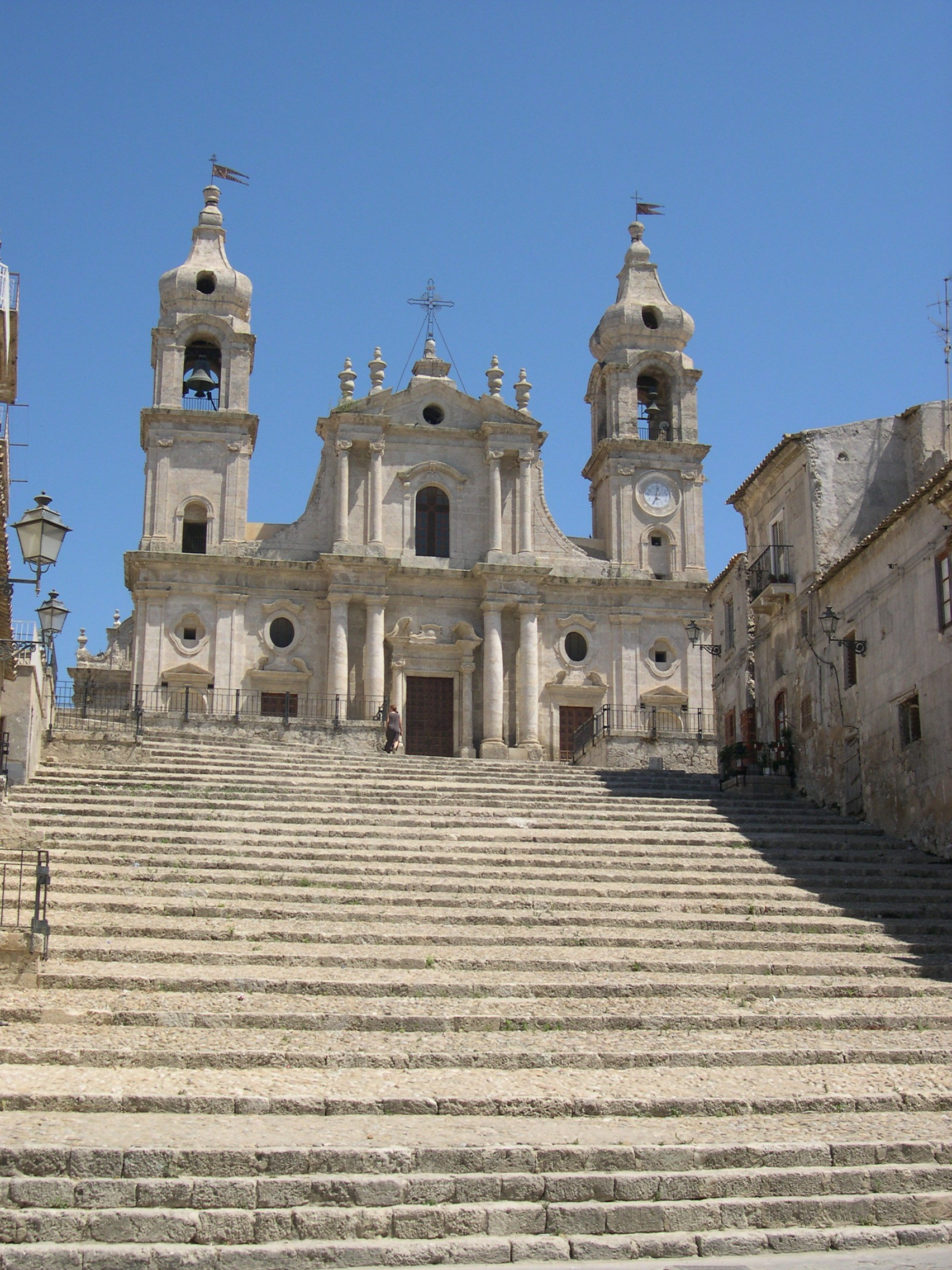
- The Mother Church in Palma di Montechiaro.

- Flag Coat of arms

- Location within Sicily Location within Italy
- Coordinates: 37°12′N 13°46′E
- Country: Italy
- Region: Sicily
- Province: Agrigento (AG)
- Frazioni: Marina di Palma, Villaggio Giordano

Government
  - Mayor: Stefano Castellino

Area
  - Total: 77.06 km^{2} (29.75 sq mi)
- Elevation: 160 m (520 ft)

Population (31 December 2017)
  - Total: 22,663
  - Density: 294.1/km^{2} (761.7/sq mi)
- Demonym: Palmesi
- Time zone: UTC+1 (CET)
  - Summer (DST): UTC+2 (CEST)
- Postal code: 92020
- Dialing code: 0922
- Patron saint: Maria Santissima del Rosario
- Saint day: 8 September

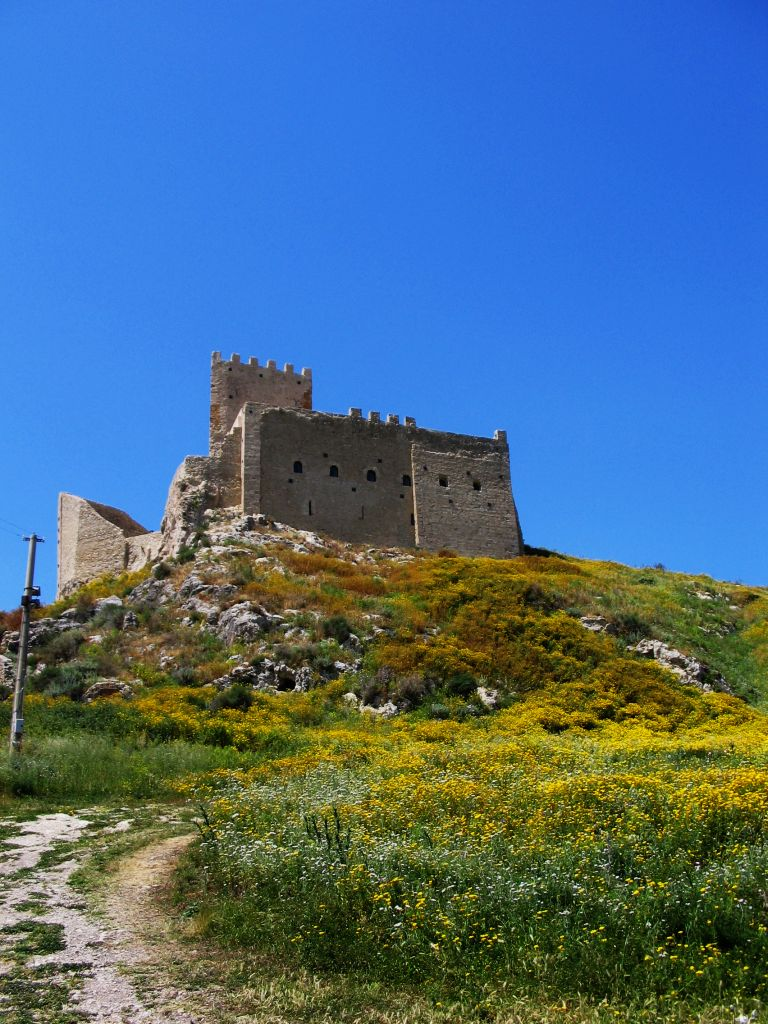
The Castle Chiaromonte.

Palma di Montechiaro (Sicilian: Parma di Muntichiaru) is a town and comune in the province of Agrigento, Sicily, southern Italy. Many Greek archaeological findings of Magna Graecia have been found near the town.

Formerly known as Palma, in 1863, Montechiaro was added to the name, in honour of the Chiaramonte family whose stronghold is close to the town.

== Controversy ==
In 2002, La Repubblica reported the presence of the prominent Italian politician Angelino Alfano (a Silvio Berlusconi protégé) at the 1996 wedding of the daughter of Croce Napoli (died 2001), believed by investigators to be the Mafia boss of Palma di Montechiaro, as shown on an amateur video of the party. Alfano, then a deputy of the Sicilian Regional Assembly, was greeted with affection by Croce Napoli. Alfano at first told La Repubblica he had "no memory or recollection of this wedding" and that "I never participated in a wedding of Mafia or of their children, I do not know his wife, Gabriella, and I've never heard of Mr. Croce Napoli who was said to be boss of Palma di Montechiaro." Later he said that he remembered that he was actually at the wedding but had been invited by the groom and did not know the bride and her family.

== Main sights ==
- Mother Church
- Castle
- Benedictine Monastery
- Ducal Palace
- San Carlo Tower
- Palazzo degli Scolopi
- Ruins of the Baroque church of Santa Maria della Luce
- Archaeological park of Zubbia

== In popular culture ==
Palma di Montechiaro is associated with Italian author Giuseppe Tomasi di Lampedusa.

New Zealand author James McNeish, who visited Palma di Montechiaro in the early 1960s, describes it as a place of abject poverty, avoided by locals. ‘Its poverty is spectacular. The cavernous streets are scored by serpentines of black faeces and other matter and a veil of chalky dust pollutes the air. From the main road the whole plaster town tilts downwards, as though arrested in a macabre lunge towards the sea. Once I drove through with a woman companion. She looked once, and screamed. She did not speak again until we were some distance outside the township'

In 2019, the Italian fashion brand Dolce & Gabbana held a big fashion and jewelry event in Palma di Montechiaro. The event celebrated the town’s link to the novel Il Gattopardo (“The Leopard”) by Giuseppe Tomasi di Lampedusa, which is connected to the town’s history.

== Notable people ==
- Filippo Sciascia (born 1972), artist
- Giuseppe di Stefano Paternó (born 1862), Brazilian politician
