= Alby Duckmanton =

New Zealand cricketer

Alby Duckmanton QSM
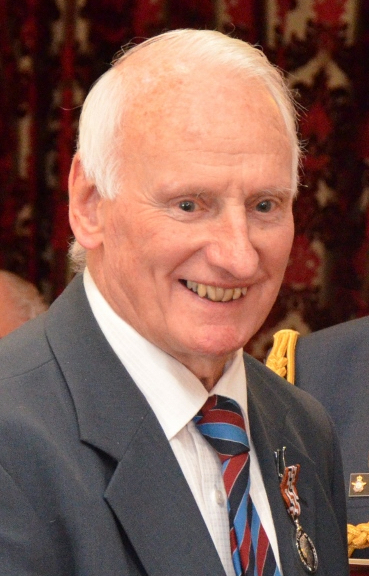
- Duckmanton in 2013

Personal information
- Full name: Albert George Duckmanton
- Born: 9 October 1933; Christchurch, New Zealand
- Died: 1 February 2015 (aged 81); Christchurch, New Zealand
- Batting: Right-handed
- Bowling: Right-arm off-break
- Role: All-rounder

Domestic team information
- Years: Team
- 1951/52–1961/62: Canterbury
- FC debut: 22 December 1951 v Otago
- Last FC: 18 January 1962 v Central Districts

Career statistics
Competition	First-class
Matches	17
Runs scored	387
Batting average	14.88
100s/50s	0/1
Top score	69
Balls bowled	2,070
Wickets	32
Bowling average	23.75
5 wickets in innings	1
10 wickets in match	0
Best bowling	5/29
Catches/stumpings	14/–
- Source: CricketArchive, 21 April 2023

Albert George "Alby" Duckmanton QSM (9 October 1933 – 1 February 2015) was a New Zealand cricketer and cricket administrator.

== Biography ==
Born in Christchurch in 1933, Duckmanton was educated at Christchurch Boys' High School. He played for the Canterbury under-20 team when he was 16, and made his debut for the senior Canterbury team two months after his 18th birthday. However, he was selected only sporadically until the 1960–61 season. He made his highest score with the bat, 69, in his final first-class innings in 1962.

Duckmanton also represented Canterbury and Waikato at badminton, and was a senior rugby union referee.

After retiring from first-class cricket, Duckmanton was a board member of the Canterbury Cricket Association from 1962 to 1966, and from 1977 to 1980. He then served as chairman from 1980 to 1985, vice-president from 1985 to 1989 and president from 1989 to 1991. Also in 1991 he was made a life member of the Canterbury Cricket Association.

Between 1981 and 1988 he served on the New Zealand Cricket Council, and in 1983 he was manager of the New Zealand team.

In the 2013 Queen's Birthday Honours, Duckmanton was awarded the Queen's Service Medal, for services to sport. He died in Christchurch in 2015.
