= D'Algy =

D'Algy is a surname. Notable people with the surname include:

- Helena D'Algy (1906–after 1991), Portuguese film actress
- Tony D'Algy (1897–1977), Portuguese film actor, brother of Helena

== See also ==
- Algy
