= Algés River =

River in Portugal

Coordinates: 38°43′10″N 9°13′06″W

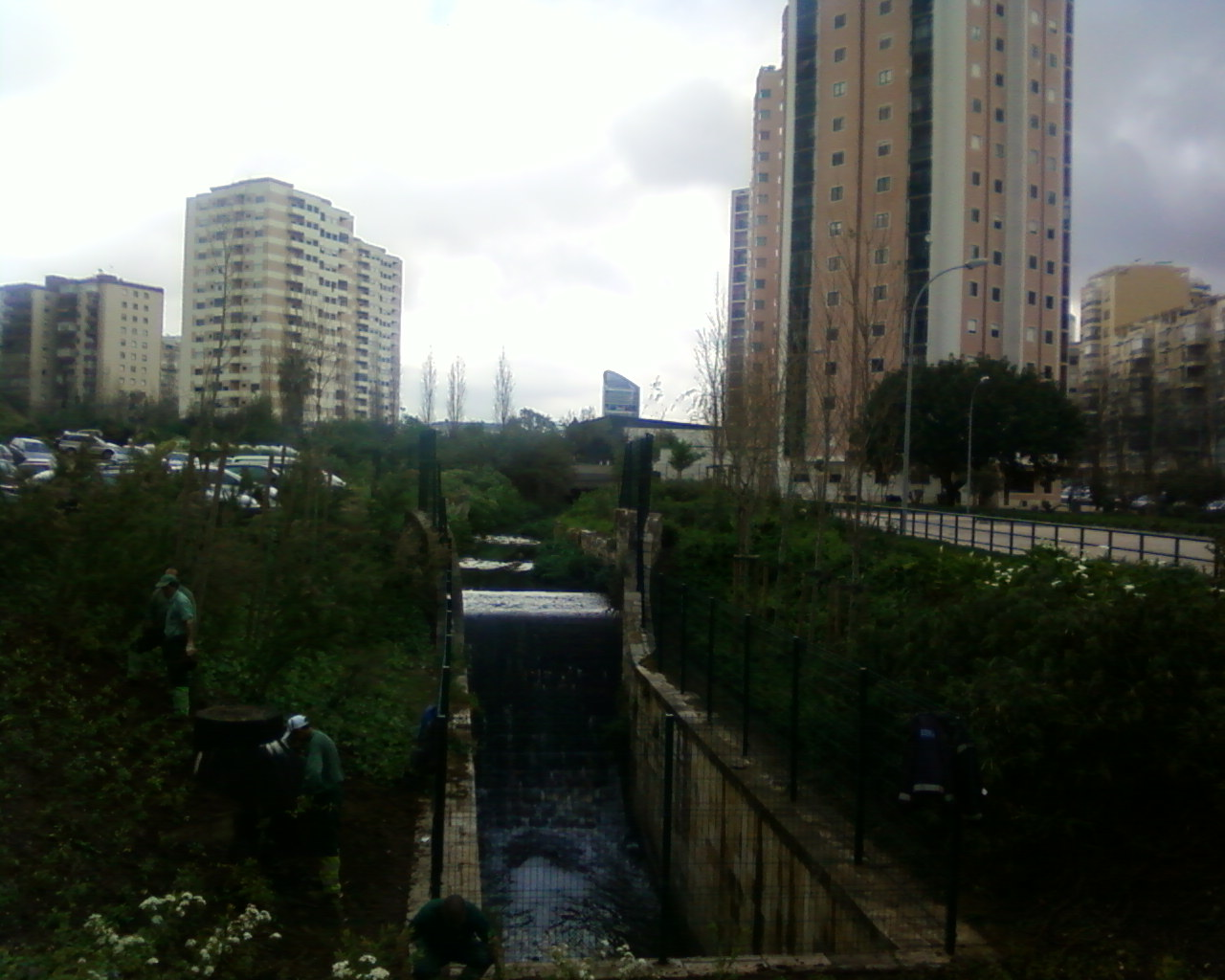
Algés river, with the Monsanto Tower in the far background, where it starts running under the ground.

Algés River (Portuguese pronunciation: [alˈʒɛʃ]) flows into the Tagus River in Algés Parish, Portugal. Since Algés grew, some parts of the river were covered, and now it runs under the ground, including the final stretch to the sea.
