= Del Carreto =

Sicilian family

Coat of arms of the del Carreto family

del Carreto, Baron of Racalmuto were the descendants of Constanzia di Chiaramonte (1290–1350) the heiress and daughter of Federico di Chiaramonte, Lord of Racalmuto a member of the prominent Sicilian Chiaramonte family. Constanzia married Antonio del Carretto on 11 November 1307. This marriage unified the del Carretto and Chiaramonte families, bringing to the family the ancient Racalmuto titles. For the following two centuries the del Carretto and Racalmuto names were united.

Constanzia died at Girgenti in 1350.
