= Algea (company) =

Norwegian seaweed processing company

- Type: Subsidiary
- Industry: Chemical industry
- Founded: 1937; 89 years ago
- Founder: Haakon Torgesen
- Headquarters: Kristiansund, Norway
- Area served: Worldwide
- Products: Seaweed-based fertilizer, food, and cosmetic ingredients
- Owner: Valagro (Syngenta)
- Number of employees: 47 (2023)
- Website: www.algea.com

Algea is a Norwegian multinational company operating in the chemical industry and manufacturing seaweed-based fertilizer, animal feed, food supplements, and cosmetic ingredients. The company processes the Ascophyllum nodosum seaweed into phytocomplexes that are used for its products.

== History ==
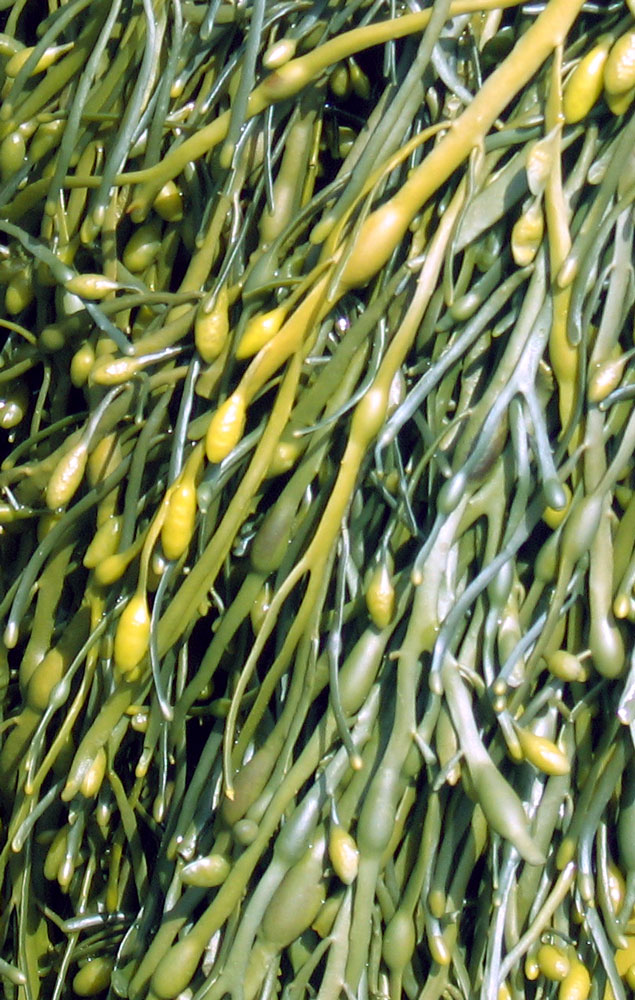
Ascophyllum nodosum seaweed used by Algea

Algea Produckter As was founded in 1937 by Haakon Torgersen. The Neptune’s trident logo identified the company until 1987.

Algea was acquired by Protan, when its international level was already evident: it exported 50% of its production of seaweed meal to the Netherlands, United Kingdom, France, and the United States. For the 10 years, from 1960 onward, Algea built several plants along the Norwegian coast, including that of Brønnøysund, which still exists today. The commercial results also made it possible for the company to invest in research and develop a new method of production that would revolutionize the market.

In the 1980s, supported by proven beneficial properties of its products, Algea diversified production, extending it to animal feed, including fish food, and cosmetics. Protan was in turn acquired by the Securus group. The logo of the latter, a double "S", was used by Algea from 1987 to 1994.

In 2000, the company acquired Maxicrop, an English company specializing in the production of seaweed extracts, as well as Frøytang, a Norwegian company at the time leader in production of seaweed products for human and animal consumption.

In 2002 the Italian Valagro group, a manufacturer of biostimulants which has since been acquired by Syngenta, acquired Algea and started a process of restructuring and development of its brand. Following the restructuring, Algea entered the functional food and food supplement ingredients markets as well as the cosmetic ingredients market.

== Algea Businesses ==
- Ingredients for Functional Foods and Food Supplements
- Ingredients for cosmetic products
- Ingredients for special fertilizers
- Ingredients for animal feeds
