= Scioscia (mountain) =

Mountain in Italy

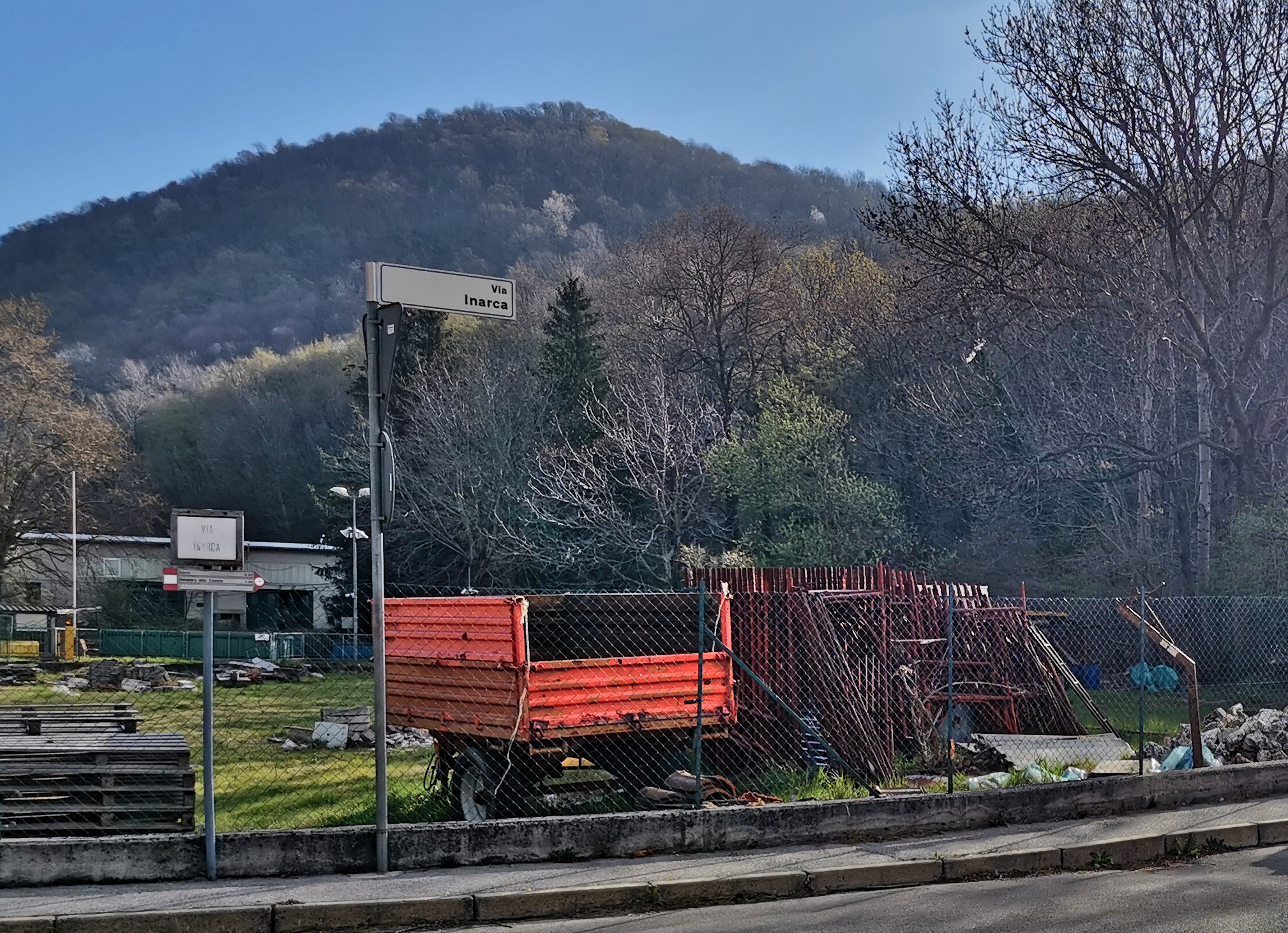

Highest point
- Elevation: 667 m (2,188 ft)
- Prominence: 279 m (915 ft)
- Coordinates: 45.8351°N 9.2658°E

Geography
- Location: Lombardy, Italy

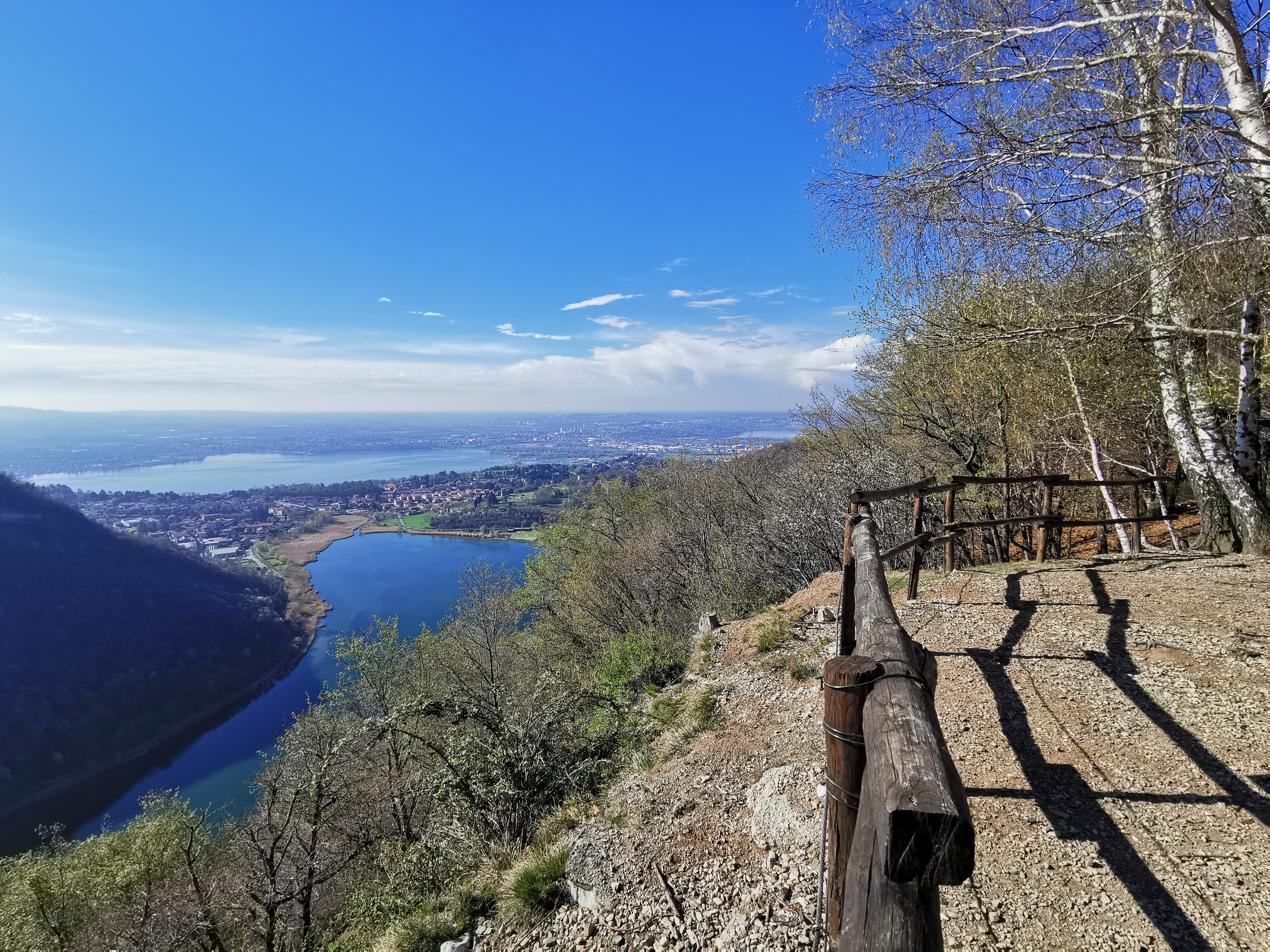
Lago del Segrino seen from Monte Scioscia, with in background the two lakes of Pusiano (on the left) and Alserio (on the right)

Scioscia (Italian: [ˈʃɔʃʃa], Canzés: [ˈʃɔʃa]) is a low mountain in the historical region of Brianza in Lombardy, Italy, facing Lake Segrino. It has an elevation of 667 metres above mean sea level.
