= Filippo Sciascia =

Italian artist (born 1972)

- Born: 23 July 1972 (age 54); Palma di Montechiaro, Sicily, Italy
- Education: Accademia di Belle Arti di Firenze
- Known for: Conceptual art, installation art, painting.
- Notable work: For Your Consideration Only, Sophia, Fall Rising, Trinacria, Lux Lumina

Filippo Amato Sciascia (born 23 July 1972) is an Italian artist. In 1983, he moved to New York and in 1985, he moved to Trieste to attend the Institute Art of Nordio. He later moved to Florence to finish his studies at Accademia di Belle Arti Firenze. He began working in New York in the late 1980s, and added regular work in Bali, Indonesia starting in 1998. During this time, he also worked in China and across South East Asia in different projects, both local and international exhibiting in galleries and museums.

He lived and worked in Bali since 1998, and since 2008 he has traveled between Bali and Milan for his work.

== Early life ==
Sciascia was born in Palma Di Montechiaro (Agrigento) Sicilia, Italy on 23 July 1972.

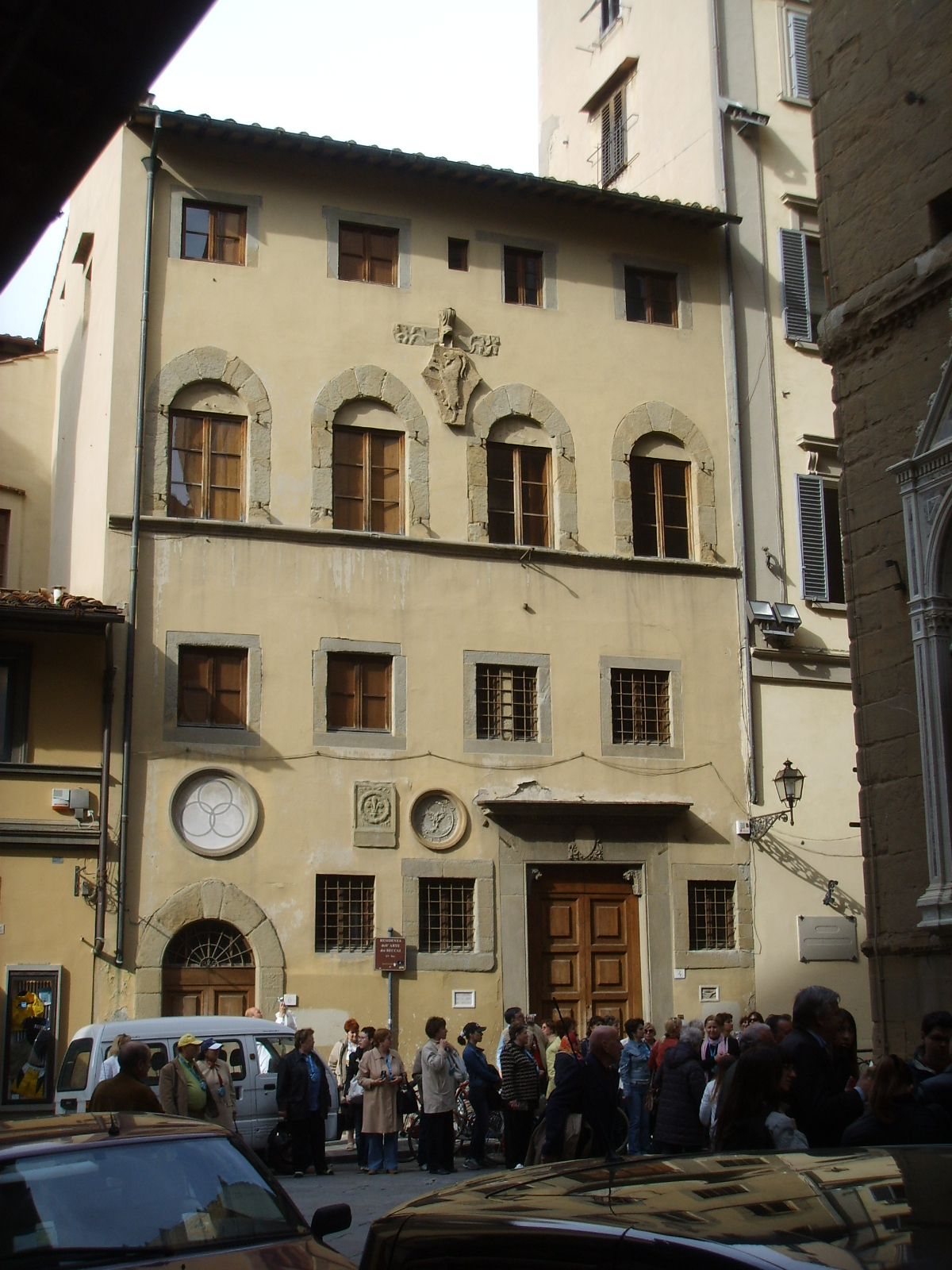
Filippo Sciascia studied at Accademia di Belle Arti Firenze, University of Firenze.

== Publications ==
In addition to his work as a visual artist, Sciascia published an autobiography published in 2006 entitled Filippo Sciascia. He also published a catalog of paintings entitled Lux Lumina in 2009.
