= 2013 New Zealand gallantry awards =

Awards list for New Zealand

The 2013 New Zealand gallantry awards were announced via a Special Honours List on 20 April 2013. Recipients were awarded New Zealand gallantry awards.

== New Zealand Gallantry Decoration (NZGD) ==
- Lance Corporal Leon Kristopher Smith – New Zealand Special Air Service. Posthumous award.

== New Zealand Gallantry Medal (NZGM) ==
- Squadron Leader Benjamin Mark Pryor – Royal New Zealand Air Force.
- Staff Sergeant Dean Maurice Rennie – Royal New Zealand Army Logistic Regiment.
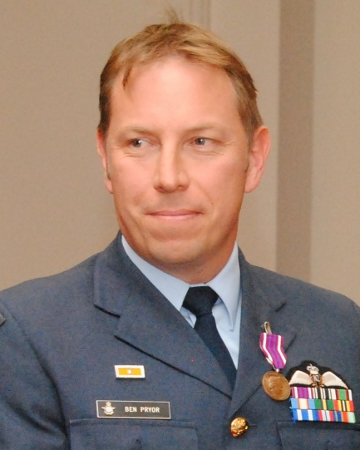
Ben Pryor

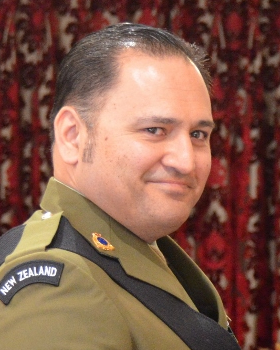
Dean Rennie
