= Chiaramonte =

Noble family of Sicily

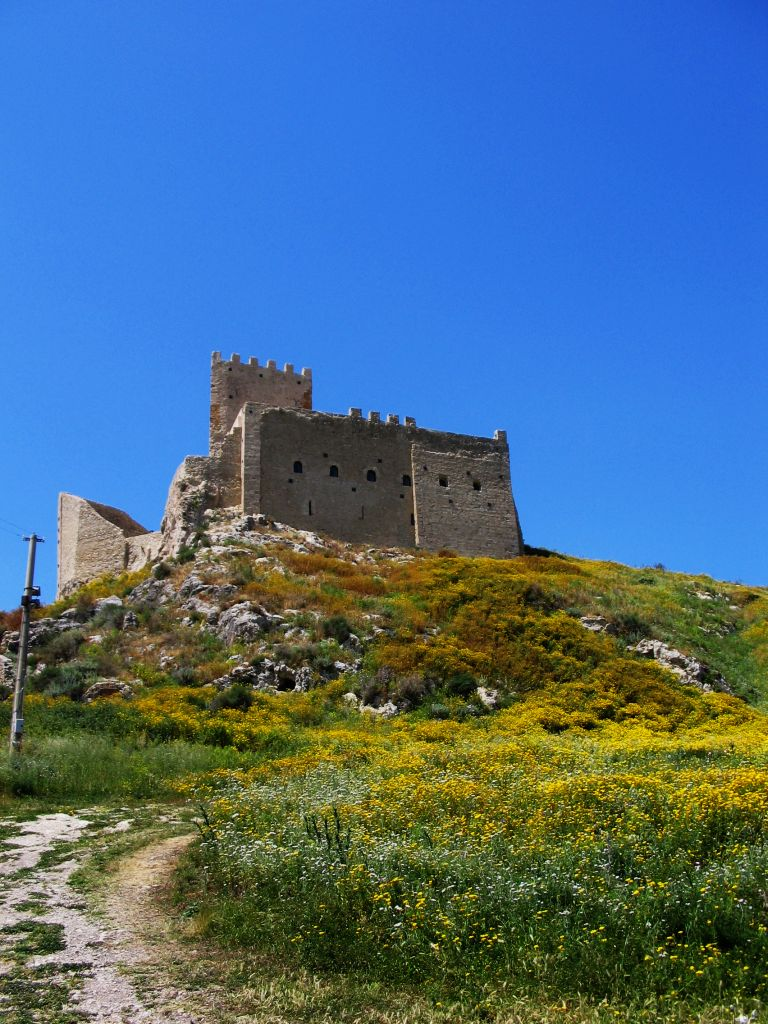
Chiaramonte castle at Palma di Montechiaro

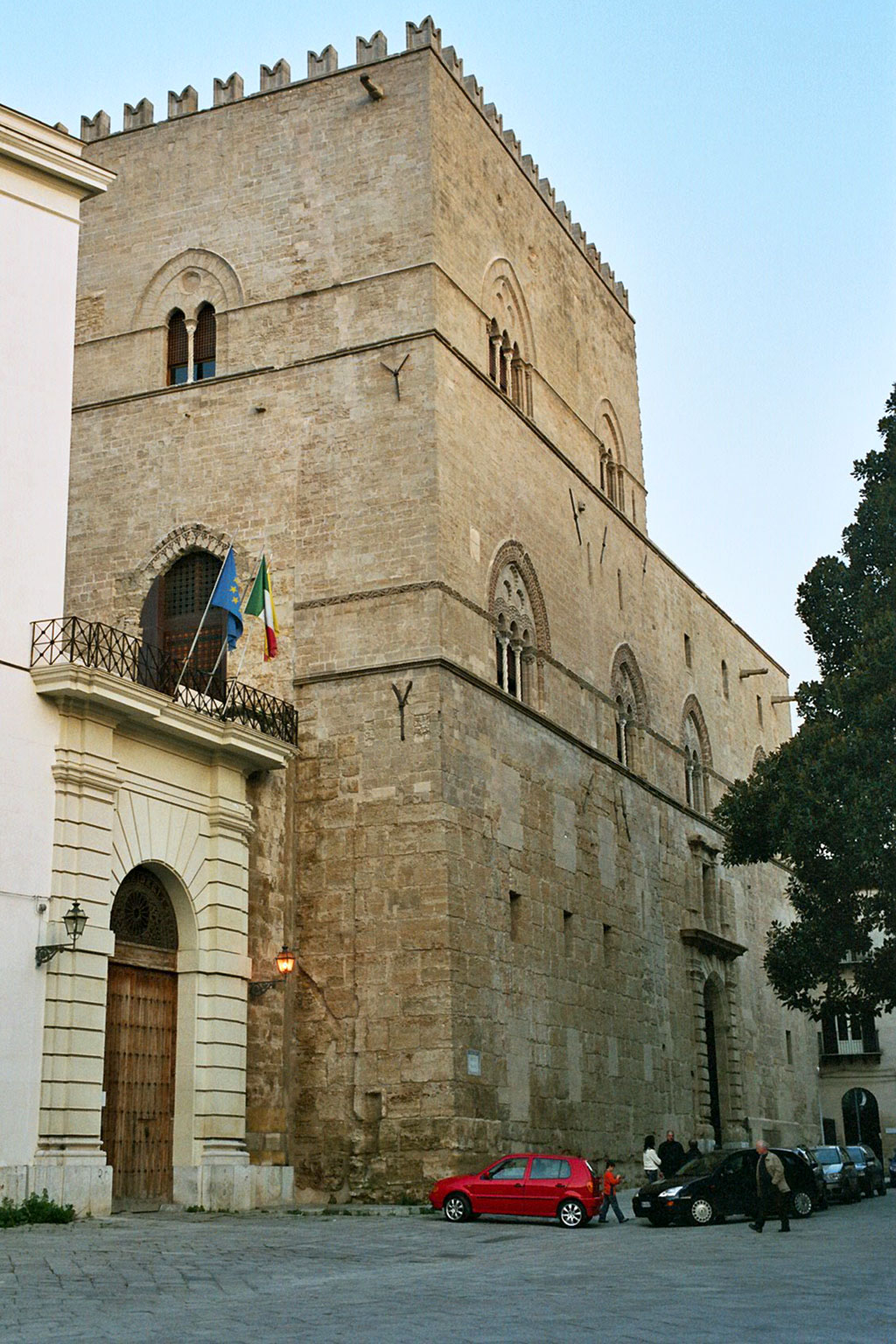
Palazzo Chiaramonte, Palermo

The Chiaramonte are a noble family of Sicily. They became the most powerful and wealthy family in Sicily. In the 13th century the marriage of Manfredi I Chiaramonte (also called Manfredi il Vecchio) to Isabella Mosca, united the two Sicilian counties of Modica and Ragusa. Around 1307–1320, the couple built the family seat, the Palazzo Chiaramonte, in Palermo.

The family's great power in Sicily lasted until 1392 with the execution of Andrea Chiaramonte, 8th Count of Modica, last defender of Palermo for King Frederick IV of Sicily against the illegitimate pretender Martin I of Aragon. It was outside of the Palazzo Chiaramonte that Andrea Chiaramonte was executed on 1 June 1392

Following the fall of the House of Chiaramonte, their palace became known as the Palazzo Steri. The palazzi subsequently became the residence of Martin I of Aragon and of Blanche de Navarre, then the Spanish viceroys, and then a prison of the Inquisition. Today, the palace's much copied and distinctive form of Norman Gothic architecture is known, in Sicily, as the Chiaramontan style.

Traditionally, direct male descendants of Manfredi are called Pietro, Ugo or Flavio – Pietro the foundation stone, Ugo the king of Sicily and Flavio because of Sicily's bright yellow sun. At present, the family uses the Cardone surname.

The name of the Chiaramonte can be found today in numerous Sicilian toponyms. The town of Chiaramonte Gulfi in (province of Ragusa) and Palma di Montechiaro (province of Agrigento) are both named after the Chiaramonte family. Nearby the latter is a stronghold built in 1358 by Federico III Chiaramonte, Count of Modica.

== See also ==
- County of Modica
- The del Carreto Barons of Racalmuto
