= Algy =

Algy is a masculine given name. Notable people with the name include:

- Algy Clark (born 1903), American football player
- Algy Gehrs (1880–1953), Australian cricketer
- Algy Paterson (died 1995), last fluent speaker of the Martuthunira language
- Algy Ward (21st century), English rock and roll bass guitarist and singer
- Algernon "Spotty" Perkins, fictional friend of Walter the Softy from Dennis the Menace and Gnasher
- Algernon "Algy" Lacey, fictional character in the Biggles books, friend and cousin of Biggles

== See also ==
- D'Algy
