= Securus =

German automobile

The Securus was a German automobile manufactured only in 1906. A two-speed tricar, it was built in Berlin by Max Ortmann.
