= Ngāneko Minhinnick =

Dame Ngāneko Minhinnick DNZM JP
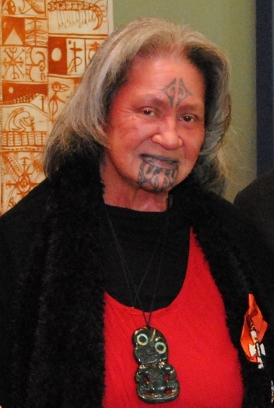
- Minhinnick in 2013
- Born: 15 August 1939
- Died: 15 June 2017 (aged 77)
- Known for: Ngāti Te Ata leader
- Spouse: Eden Minhinnick

Dame Ngāneko Kaihau Minhinnick DNZM JP (15 August 1939 – 15 June 2017) was a New Zealand Māori leader.

== Biography ==
Born on 15 August 1939 of Ngāti Te Ata descent, Minhinnick grew up in Waiuku and was one of 15 children. From an early age she was chosen by her people as a future leader, attending Māori Land Court hearings from the age of 11, and becoming kaitiaki of Tāhuna Marae when she was 19 years old. She had married her husband, Eden Minhinnick, when she was 16.

Minhinnick was named the New Zealand Māori Council's young woman of the year in 1970, recognising her involvement in community affairs as a justice of the peace, Māori language interpreter, and teacher of Māori language at night classes.

In 1985, Minhinnick was one of the leaders of the Manukau Harbour Claim concerning pollution of the harbour to the Waitangi Tribunal. The tribunal's report, and Minhinnick's subsequent submissions to the government, were factors in the development of the Resource Management Act 1991. She represented her iwi at the United Nations Human Rights Council in 1988, and invited a United Nations special rapporteur to Tāhuna Marae. She also sat on the Auckland Regional Council.

In the 2013 Queen's Birthday Honours, Minhinnick was appointed a Dame Companion of the New Zealand Order of Merit for services to Māori and conservation. Her investiture was at Government House in Wellington on 5 September 2013.

Minhinnick died on 15 June 2017, and her tangihanga (a traditional Māori funeral rite) was held at Tāhuna Marae.
