= Piri Sciascia =

New Zealand Māori leader (1946–2020)

Piri Sciascia ONZM
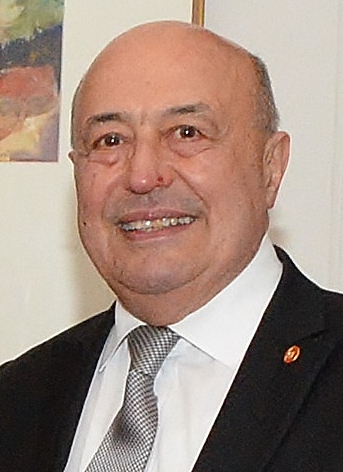
- Sciascia in 2017
- Born: Piri John Ngarangikaunuhia Sciascia; 6 November 1946; Pōrangahau, New Zealand
- Died: 18 January 2020 (aged 73)
- Spouse: Gaylene Ann Sciascia
- Relatives: Tākuta Ferris (nephew)

Piri John Ngarangikaunuhia Sciascia ONZM (6 November 1946 – 18 January 2020) was a New Zealand Māori leader, kapa haka exponent, and university administrator. From 2016 until his death, he served as kaumātua and advisor to the governor-general and government of New Zealand.

== Early life and family ==
Born at Pōrangahau on 6 November 1946, Sciascia was the son of Frank la Basse and Maymorn Sciascia. He was of Māori and Italian descent, and affiliated to Ngāti Kahungunu, Ngāi Tahu, Kāti Māmoe, Ngati maniapoto, Ngāti Raukawa, and Rangitāne. Sciascia was educated at Te Aute College, and then studied at the University of Otago, completing a BSc in 1968 and Bachelor of Arts in 1971. He later completed a BA(Hons) at Victoria University of Wellington in 1977, and a Diploma of Teaching at Palmerston North Teachers' College in 1981.

In 1973, Sciascia married Gaylene Ann Wilson, and the couple went on to have five children. Tākuta Ferris is his nephew.

== Academic and public service career ==
Sciascia was a lecturer at Palmerston North Teachers' College from 1975 until 1981, before serving as a director of the Council for Maori and South Pacific Arts from 1981 to 1989. In 1989, he joined the Department of Conservation (DOC) as assistant director-general kaupapa Māori, serving in that role until 1991, when he became assistant director-general of DOC.

In 2000, Sciascia was appointed assistant vice-chancellor (Māori) at Victoria University of Wellington, later becoming pro vice-chancellor (Māori) and then, in 2014, deputy vice-chancellor (Māori), in which role he served until 2016.

== Māori arts ==
Sciascia toured with the Māori Theatre Trust in the 1970s, and founded the Ngāti Kahungunu kapa haka group, Tamatea Ariki Nui, in 1977. He was the latter group's leader, tutor and composer until 1991.

He was a member of the organising committee for the international exhibition Te Maori, which toured the United States and New Zealand from 1984 to 1987, serving as the Deputy Chairman of the Maori sub committee and contributing to the exhibition's catalogue. He also served on the committee of the Aotearoa Maori Festival of Arts, the Rūnanganui o Ngāti Kahungunu Arts Board, and as chair of the Māori Broadcast Funding Agency, Te Māngai Pāho.

== Later life and death ==
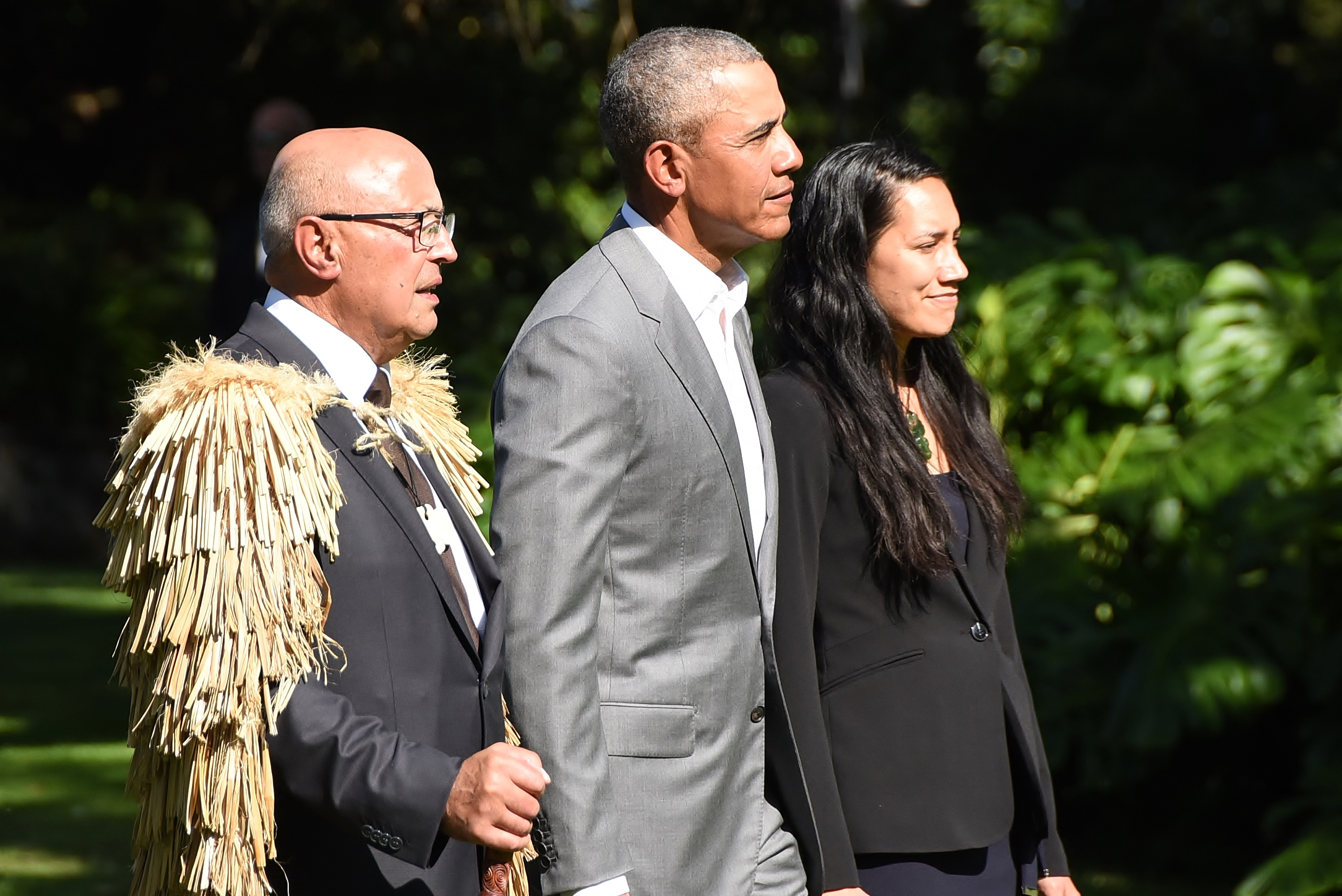
Sciascia (left) and Te Amohaere Morehu accompanying Barack Obama at a pōwhiri (welcoming ceremony) at Government House, Auckland, in March 2018

After retiring from Victoria in 2016, Sciascia held the position of kaumātua to the governor-general, prime minister and Cabinet, giving advice on Māori protocol and language, and assisting in hosting visiting dignitaries. He died on 18 January 2020.

== Honours and awards ==
In 1990, Sciascia was awarded the New Zealand 1990 Commemoration Medal. In the 2013 Queen's Birthday Honours, he was appointed an Officer of the New Zealand Order of Merit, for services to Māori arts.

Sciascia received the Keeper of Traditions award at the 2008 Waiata Māori Music Awards, and a Ngā Tohu ā Tā Kingi Ihaka (Sir Kingi Ihaka Award) in 2016 in recognition of his lifetime contribution to Māori arts.
