= Gaylene Sciascia =

New Zealand choreographer and dance educator

Gaylene Sciascia ONZM
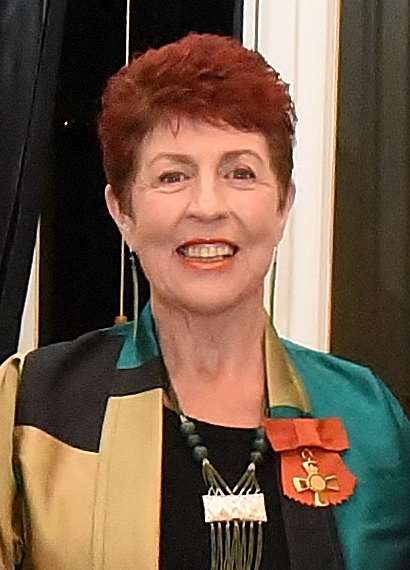
- Sciascia in 2017
- Born: Gaylene Ann Wilson; 3 September 1948 (age 76); Auckland, New Zealand
- Occupation(s): Choreographer, contemporary dance teacher
- Spouse: Piri Sciascia (m. 1972; died 2020)

Gaylene Ann Sciascia ONZM (born 3 September 1948) is a New Zealand choreographer and dance educator.

Sciascia was born Gaylene Ann Wilson in Auckland on 3 September 1948. She graduated from the University of Utah with a Master of Fine Arts.

In 1972 she opened New Zealand's inaugural contemporary dance company, New Dance, along with John Casserly, Suzanne Renner and Jennifer Shennan. When New Dance toured New Zealand in 1973 was the first national tour of a local modern dance group. Sciascia and colleagues along with others such as Susan Jordan and Jamie Bull (Impulse Dance) were part of introducing modern dance throughout New Zealand in the 1970s.

In 1976 Sciascia organised the first National Dance Congress in Porangahau.

In 1991 she established Whitireia Performing Arts and led the programme until 2011.

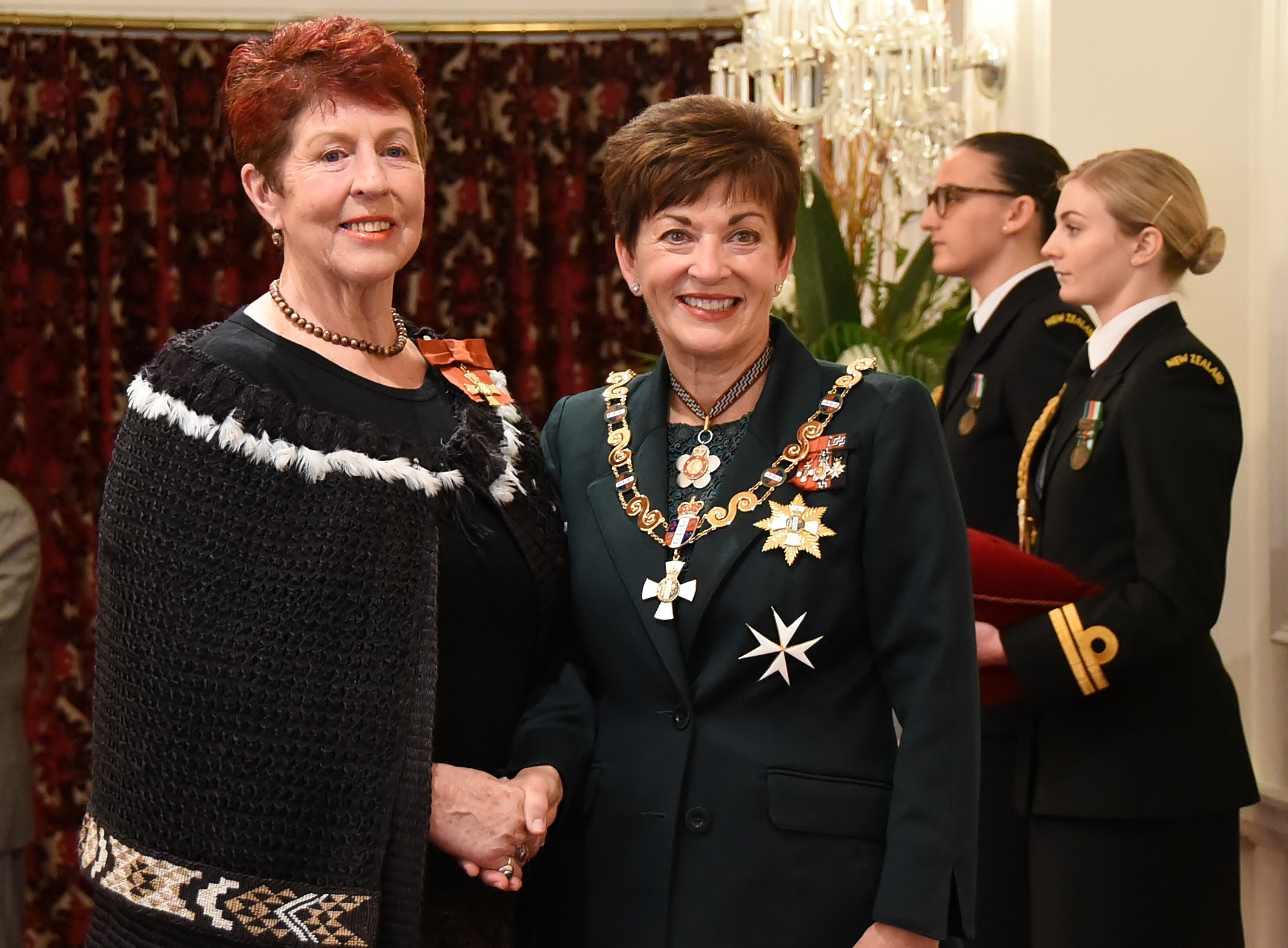
Sciascia (left), after her investiture as an Officer of the New Zealand Order of Merit by the governor-general, Dame Patsy Reddy, on 24 May 2017

In the 2017 New Year Honours, Sciascia was appointed an Officer of the New Zealand Order of Merit, for service to dance.

== Personal ==
Sciascia married Piri John Ngarangikaunuhia Sciascia in 1972. He died on 18 January 2020.
