= Alge Sache =

District in Oromia, Ethiopia

Coordinates: 8°35′N 35°40′E

Alge Sachi is one of the woredas in the Oromia Region of Ethiopia. It used to be called Supena Sodo woreda. The major town is Alge.

== Demographics ==
The 2007 national census reported a total population for this woreda of 76,611, of whom 37,914 were men and 38,697 were women; 7,354 or 9.6% of its population were urban dwellers. The majority of the inhabitants were Protestant, with 46.13% of the population reporting they observed this belief, while 27.54% of the population said they were Moslem, and 25.62% practised Ethiopian Orthodox Christianity.
