= 2013 New Zealand bravery awards =

Awards list for New Zealand

The 2013 New Zealand bravery awards were announced via a Special Honours List on 2 December 2013.

== New Zealand Bravery Decoration (NZBD) ==
For an act of exceptional bravery in a situation of danger:

- Georgina Rose Langford.
- Constable Michael Thomas Wardle – New Zealand Police.

== New Zealand Bravery Medal (NZBM) ==
For an act of bravery:

- Mark John Allen.
- Kenneth William Reilly.
- Jan Margaret Boyd.
- John Boyd.
- Detective Constable George Edward Ross Carter – New Zealand Police.
- Constable James Phillip Collins – New Zealand Police.
- Detective Constable Edward Michael Luxford – New Zealand Police.
- Constable Johan Artemus Mulder – New Zealand Police.
- Constable Liam Pham – New Zealand Police.
- Sergeant Christopher Charles Turnbull – New Zealand Police.
- Constable Andrew Stephen Warne – New Zealand Police.
- Martin Joseph Kay.
- Colin John Wiggins.
- Lois Patricia Kennedy
- Jade Ronald Lynn
