= Algés (Oeiras) =

- Civil parish
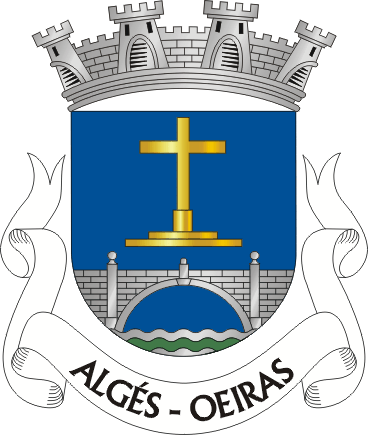
- Coat of arms

- Location in Portugal
- Coordinates: 38.7°N 9.233°W
- Country: Portugal
- Region: Lisbon
- Metropolitan area: Lisbon
- District: Lisbon
- Municipality: Oeiras
- Disbanded: 2013

Area
  - Total: 1.98 km^{2} (0.76 sq mi)

Population (2011)
  - Total: 22,273
  - Density: 11,000/km^{2} (29,000/sq mi)
- Time zone: UTC+00:00 (WET)
  - Summer (DST): UTC+01:00 (WEST)
- Postal code: 8A Rua Parque dos Anjos (8A) P-1495-100 Algés

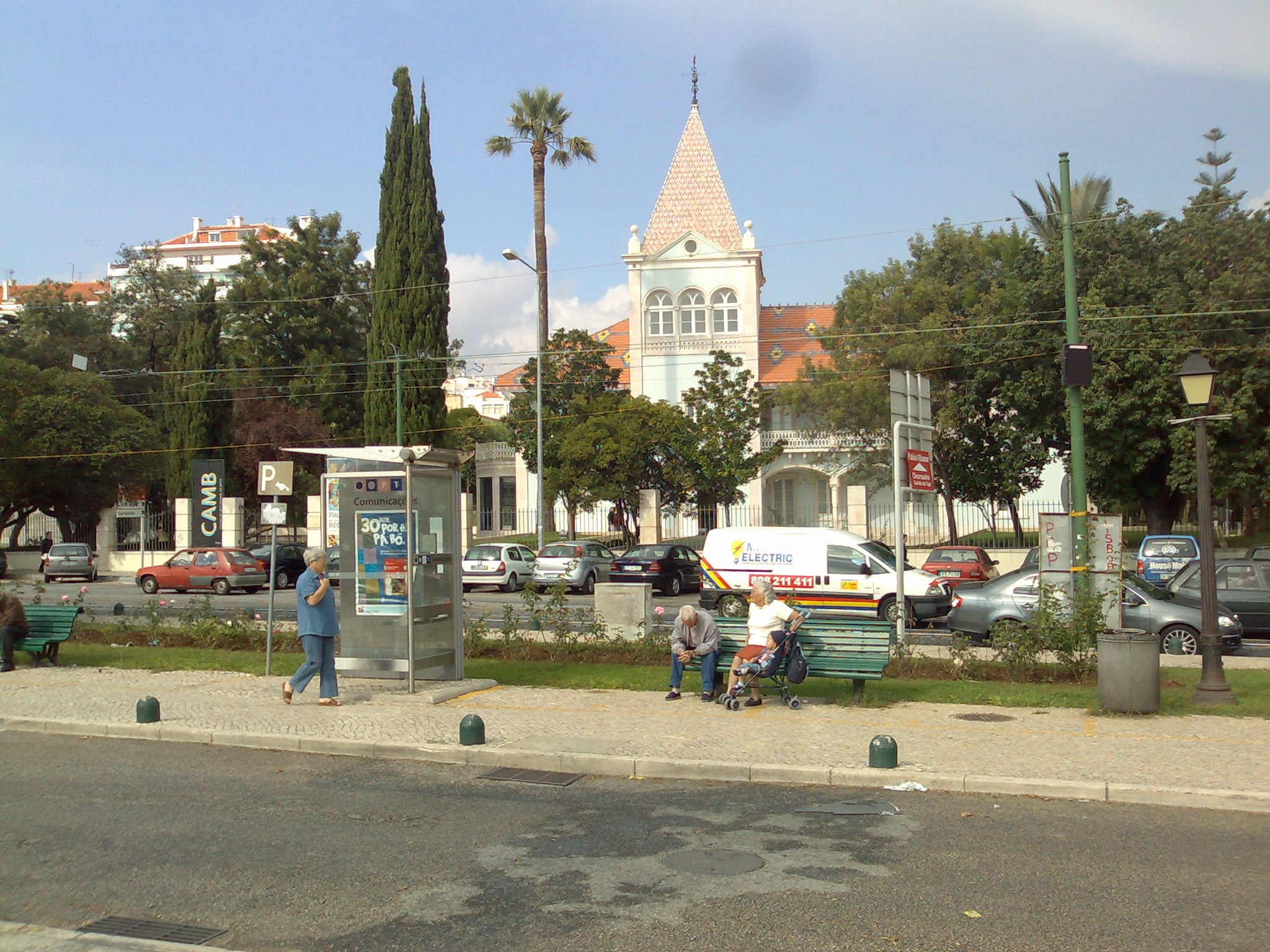
Algés

Algés (Portuguese pronunciation: [alˈʒɛʃ]) is a former civil parish in the municipality of Oeiras, in Lisbon metropolitan area, Portugal. In 2013, the parish merged into the new parish Algés, Linda-a-Velha e Cruz Quebrada-Dafundo. The population in 2011 was 22,273, in an area of 1.98 km^{2}. The parish is located near the Tagus river, between the town of Oeiras and the capital city of Lisbon. It is also a part of the Greater Lisbon Area. It is mostly a residential suburb.

Algés was elevated to a town on August 16, 1991, and the parish was officially created on June 11, 1993, after separating from the parish of Carnaxide.

== Sport ==
- União Desportiva e Recreativa de Algés (UDRA)
- Sport Algés e Dafundo
