= Bell-Booth Group Ltd v Attorney-General =

- Court: Court of Appeal of New Zealand
- Full case name: Bell-Booth Group Ltd v Attorney General (sued in respect to the Ministry of Agriculture and Fisheries)
- Decided: 21 February 1989
- Citation: [1989] 3 NZLR 148
- Transcript: Court of Appeal judgment

Court membership
- Judges sitting: Cooke P, McMullin J, Casey J

Keywords
- defamation, duty of care

Bell-Booth Group Ltd v Attorney-General [1989] 3 NZLR 148 is a leading New Zealand case regarding the legal concept of owing a duty of care in tort for negligence, which in this case was for defamation.

== Background ==
The Bell-Booth Group marketed in New Zealand a fertiliser called "Maxicrop". Unfortunately, this fertiliser did not materially improve the growth of plants.

The Ministry of Agriculture conducted a trial on this fertiliser, which was partially funded by Bell-Booth, although it was agreed that this funding gave them no legal benefits.

Ultimately, the MAF trials found no material benefit to plant growth, and they released this information via the consumer affairs TV show Fair Go, which finally aired after several episodes were prevented from screening due to a court injunction.

As a result, sales of Maxicrop plummeted, and Bell-Booth sued both MAF and the New Zealand Broadcasting Commission for defamation, where the High Court awarded general damages of $25,000 against MAF.

Bell-Booth's contention is even though the 135-day trial revealed that Maxicrop "didn't work", that MAF owed them a duty of care for the trial research results to be released to them first, in order to take steps to mitigate any financial losses, rather than being released immediately to the public, via Fair Go, as they did.

MAF appealed.

== Decision ==
The Court of Appeal reversed the High Court's earlier award of $25,000 in general damages, as MAF owed a duty of care to the agriculture industry, and the public in general and not to Bell-Booth.
