= U.D.R. Algés =

Portuguese association football club

UDRA
- Full name: União Desportiva e Recreativa de Algés
- Nickname: Furia Negra
- Founded: 1958; 68 years ago
- Ground: Algés, Portugal
- Capacity: 3000
- League: District Division
- 2007–08: N/A

União Desportiva e Recreativa de Algés (abbreviated and popular form: UDRA) is a football club from the parish of Algés in Oeiras, Portugal. Currently the club plays at district league level and the main kit colours are black and white vertical stripes.
