= 1989–90 S.L. Benfica season =

Benfica
1989–90 season
- President: João Santos
- Head coach: Sven-Göran Eriksson
- Stadium: Estádio da Luz
- Primeira Divisão: 2nd
- Taça de Portugal: Fourth-round
- European Cup: Runners-up
- Supertaça Cândido de Oliveira: Winners
- Top goalscorer: League: Magnusson (33); All: Magnusson (40)
Home colours

The 1989–90 season was Sport Lisboa e Benfica's 86th season in existence and the club's 56th consecutive season in the top flight of Portuguese football, covering the period from 1 July 1989 to 30 June 1990. Benfica competed domestically in the Primeira Divisão, the Taça de Portugal and the Supertaça, and participated in the European Cup after winning the previous league.

After only winning the Primeira Divisão, Benfica disputed the Supertaça, winning it for the third time. The league campaign was another controversial battle with Porto, who finished four points ahead of Benfica. Magnusson won the Bola de Prata. With attentions set on the European Cup, Benfica reached the final after defeating Marseille in the semi-finals. In the seventh European Cup final, Benfica lost 1–0 to AC Milan, the fifth consecutive European Cup final loss.

== Season summary ==
The new season saw the arrival of Sven-Göran Eriksson for a second term. After Benfica won the 1988–89 Primeira Divisão on 7 May 1989, Eriksson confirmed that he would take over Toni's job only three days later. In the transfer window, Benfica lost Shéu and Mozer, with the first retiring and the latter moving abroad. To replace him, the club hired Brazilian defender Aldair and Swedish midfielder Jonas Thern. Eriksson started working on 28 July with Benfica travelling to Netherlands the following day for a two-week tour. They competed in the Rotterdam Tournament in early August and had their presentation game against Spartak Moscow on the 15. They then won the Trofeo Cidade de Vigo and had a late friendly with Varzim, postponing the league opening game.

Benfica's league campaign was again a clash with Porto. The season was notable by the constant controversy surrounding referees and the battle for control of the Portuguese Football Federation. The crucial Clássico on 11 March 1990 ended with a draw, keeping Porto with a three-point lead, nearly closing the title race. Benfica was nonetheless, entirely focused on the European Cup, as Eriksson admitted that winning another European title was a target of President João Santos. Eriksson led the team through easy wins against Derry City and Budapest Honvéd. The quarter-final matches with Dnipro Dnipropetrovsk fell within a busy schedule, but despite that, Benfica flew past the Ukrainian with three-nil win.

However, the semi-finals with Marseille were much different. Benfica lost in France by 2–1; their first loss after seven games and needed a win to go through, as Erisskon said "We are not dead yet. He have a 49% chance of going through" The home reception to Marseille saw 120 thousand fans fill Estádio da Luz to witness Vata score the sole goal that qualified Benfica. In the 83rd minute, in a corner, Vata rose above everyone and slipped the ball past Jean Castaneda with his hand. Several players immediately surrounded referee Marcel Van Langenhove protesting that the goal was scored with the hand, but he disregarded their appeals. Assistant manager Toni gave his opinion: "Vata was pulled and he could not fight for the ball – unable to use his chest or head, he used his hand. So what the referee should have done is signalled a penalty, which he did not do." Bernard Tapie furiously screamed "The Portuguese are pigs, they are pigs. They gave something to the referee, it could only be. Benfica still has a lot of power and scares a lot of people. This was a disgrace."

Benfica ended the league on 20 May, finishing four points behind Porto. Three days later, they met AC Milan in the European Cup final in Vienna. Before the final, Eusébio visited Béla Guttmann's grave and prayed for his curse to be lifted. Dressed fully in red, Benfica was defeated with a goal from Rijkaard in the second half. Eriksson regretted the loss and explained his strategy: "It consisted of closely marking Gullit and van Basten, so they would be offside while simultaneously paying attention to the midfielders. I talked a lot about it and they executed it perfectly, until Rijkaard came from behind and stole our dream".

Still, Benfica did not ended the season empty handed, having previously won their third Supertaça Cândido de Oliveira against Belenenses. Magnusson was the league top-scorer with 33 goals.

== Competitions ==
Win Draw Loss Postponed

=== Overall record ===
Competition	First match	Last match	Record								
Competition	First match	Last match	G	W	D	L	GF	GA	GD	Win %	Source
Primeira Divisão	26 August 1989	20 May 1990	34	23	9	2	76	18	+58	67.65	
Taça de Portugal	9 December 1989	4 February 1990	2	1	0	1	5	3	+2	50.00	
European Cup	13 September 1989	23 May 1990	9	7	0	2	21	4	+17	77.78	
Supertaça Cândido de Oliveira	25 October 1989	29 November 1989	2	2	0	0	4	0	+4	100.00	
Total			47	33	9	5	106	25	+81	70.21	

=== Supertaça Cândido de Oliveira ===
25 October 1989 First leg	Benfica	2–0	Belenenses	Lisbon
19:00	Vata 16'; Lima 53'			Stadium: Estádio da Luz; Referee: António Marçal

29 November 1989 Second leg	Belenenses	0–2	Benfica	Lisbon
19:45			Macaé 7' (o.g.); Magnusson 75'	Stadium: Estádio do Restelo; Referee: Vítor Correia

=== Primeira Divisão ===
==== League table ====
Pos	Team	Pld	W	D	L	GF	GA	GD	Pts	Qualification or relegation
1	Porto (C)	34	27	5	2	72	16	+56	59	Qualification to European Cup first round
2	Benfica	34	23	9	2	76	18	+58	55	Qualification to UEFA Cup first round
3	Sporting CP	34	17	12	5	42	24	+18	46	Qualification to UEFA Cup first round
4	Vitória de Guimarães	34	17	11	6	46	28	+18	45	Qualification to UEFA Cup first round
5	Chaves	34	12	14	8	38	38	0	38	

Source: Primeira Divisão
Rules for classification: 1st points, 2nd head-to-head, 3rd goals average
(C) Champions

==== Results by round ====
Round	1	2	3	4	5	6	7	8	9	10	11	12	13	14	15	16	17	18	19	20	21	22	23	24	25	26	27	28	29	30	31	32	33	34
Ground	H	A	H	A	H	A	H	A	A	H	A	H	A	H	A	H	A	A	H	A	H	A	H	A	H	H	A	H	A	H	A	H	A	H
Result	W	D	W	W	W	L	W	W	D	W	W	W	D	D	W	W	D	W	W	W	D	W	D	W	W	W	D	W	D	W	L	W	W	W
Position	1	3	3	2	1	3	1	1	2	2	2	2	3	3	3	2	3	2	2	2	2	2	2	2	2	2	2	2	2	2	2	2	2	2

Source: ForaDeJogo
A = Away; H = Home; W = Win; D = Draw; L = Loss

==== Matches ====
19 August 1989 1	Benfica	Postponed	Vitória de Setúbal	Lisbon
				Stadium: Estádio da Luz

26 August 1989 2	Vitória Guimarães	1–1	Benfica	Guimarães
19:00	Caio Júnior 11'	Report	Magnusson 49'	Stadium: Estádio D. Afonso Henriques; Referee: Carlos Valente

9 September 1989 3	Benfica	5–0	Beira Mar	Lisbon
19:30	Magnusson 45', 61', 65', 80' (pen.); Vata 90'	Report		Stadium: Estádio da Luz; Referee: Francisco Silva

23 September 1989 4	Nacional	1–4	Benfica	Funchal
19:00	Heitor 81' (pen.)	Report	Jonas Thern 18'; Magnusson 21', 49'; Aldair 69'	Stadium: Estádio dos Barreiros; Referee: Rosa Santos

14 October 1989 5	Benfica	7–0	Penafiel	Lisbon
19:45	Magnusson 47', 83' (pen.), 87', 90'; Vata 65'; Abel Campos 68', 89'	Report		Stadium: Estádio da Luz; Referee: Alder Dante

22 October 1989 6	Porto	1–0	Benfica	Porto
20:30	Demol 18' (pen.)	Report		Stadium: Estádio das Antas; Referee: Francisco Silva

28 October 1989 7	Benfica	5–0	Portimonense	Lisbon
20:00	Magnusson 2', 24', 85' (pen.); Abel Campos 41'; Aldair 50'	Report		Stadium: Estádio da Luz; Referee: Veiga Trigo

5 November 1989 8	Sporting	0–1	Benfica	Lisbon
21:00		Report	César Brito 57'	Stadium: Estádio de Alvalade; Referee: Fortunato Azevedo

19 November 1989 9	Desportivo de Chaves	0–0	Benfica	Chaves
19:00		Report		Stadium: Estádio Municipal de Chaves; Referee: Miranda de Sousa

25 November 1989 10	Benfica	4–0	Marítimo	Lisbon
19:00	Magnusson 45' (pen.), 59', 63'; Vata 55'	Report		Stadium: Estádio da Luz; Referee: Carlos Valente

3 December 1989 11	Braga	0–4	Benfica	Braga
19:00		Report	Valdo 6', 63'; Thern 67'; Abel Campos 79'	Stadium: Estádio 1º de Maio; Referee: Manuel Nogueira

13 December 1989 1	Benfica	5–1	Vitória de Setúbal	Lisbon
19:45	Vata 11', 73', 78'; Pacheco 30'; Magnusson 85'	Report	Mladenov 37'	Stadium: Estádio da Luz; Referee: Veiga Trigo

16 December 1989 12	Benfica	3–1	Feirense	Lisbon
20:00	Vata 20'; Aldair 51'; Paneira 86'	Report	Veloso 4' (o.g.)	Stadium: Estádio da Luz; Referee: Serafim Alvito

23 December 1989 13	Tirsense	1–1	Benfica	Santo Tirso
20:15	Sérgio 31'	Report	César Brito 62'	Stadium: Estádio Abel Alves de Figueiredo; Referee: Mário Leal

30 December 1989 14	Benfica	1–1	Boavista	Lisbon
19:45	Pacheco 67'	Report	Forbs 2'	Stadium: Estádio da Luz; Referee: Rosa Santos

7 January 1990 15	União da Madeira	0–3	Benfica	Funchal
19:00		Report	Aldair 21', 41'; Magnusson 26'	Stadium: Estádio dos Barreiros; Referee: Miranda de Sousa

14 January 1990 16	Benfica	2–0	Estrela da Amadora	Lisbon
19:30	Magnusson 41', 85' (pen.)	Report		Stadium: Estádio da Luz; Referee: Juvenal Silvestre

21 January 1990 17	Belenenses	0–0	Benfica	Lisbon
19:30		Report		Stadium: Estádio do Restelo; Referee: Veiga Trigo

28 January 1990 18	Vitória de Setúbal	1–2	Benfica	Setúbal
20:30	Makukula 44'	Report	Pacheco 46'; Magnusson 48'	Stadium: Estádio do Bonfim; Referee: Xavier de Oliveira

11 February 1990 19	Benfica	2–0	Vitória de Guimarães	Lisbon
20:30	Magnusson 12'; Pacheco 37'	Report		Stadium: Estádio da Luz; Referee: José Pratas

18 February 1990 20	Beira-Mar	0–2	Benfica	Aveiro
19:00		Report	Ricardo Gomes 20'; Lima 90'	Stadium: Estádio Mário Duarte; Referee: Bento Marques

24 February 1990 21	Benfica	1–1	Nacional	Lisbon
19:00	Ricardo Gomes 41'	Report	Edmilson 86'	Stadium: Estádio da Luz; Referee: José Filipe

3 March 1990 22	Penafiel	0–4	Benfica	Penafiel
19:00		Report	Vata 4'; Magnusson 43'; Valdo 64'; César Brito 84'	Stadium: Estádio Municipal 25 de Abril; Referee: Fortunato Azevedo

11 March 1990 23	Benfica	0–0	Porto	Lisbon
20:00		Report		Stadium: Estádio da Luz; Referee: Veiga Trigo

17 March 1990 24	Portimonense	2–3	Benfica	Setúbal
19:45	Luciano 4'; Getov 42'	Report	Magnusson 24', 37'; Lima 83'	Stadium: Estádio do Bonfim; Referee: Rosa Santos

25 March 1990 25	Benfica	2–1	Sporting	Lisbon
20:00	Paneira 22'; Lima 32'	Report	Silas 85'; Paulinho Cascavel (red card) 92'	Stadium: Estádio da Luz; Referee: Jorge Coroado

31 March 1990 26	Benfica	2–0	Desportivo de Chaves	Lisbon
20:00	Magnusson 50', 69'	Report		Stadium: Estádio da Luz; Referee: Miranda de Sousa

8 April 1990 27	Marítimo	1–1	Benfica	Funchal
19:00	José Luís 15'	Report	60' Vata	Stadium: Estádio dos Barreiros; Referee: José Pratas

14 April 1992 28	Benfica	3–1	Braga	Lisbon
19:00	Magnusson 20'; César Brito 33'; Vata 80'	Report	Paulo Moroni 90'	Stadium: Estádio da Luz; Referee: Ezequiel Feijão

22 April 1990 29	Feirense	1–1	Benfica	Santa Maria da Feira
20:00	João Luís 65'	Report	Magnusson 45'	Stadium: Estádio Marcolino de Castro; Referee: Soares Dias

25 April 1990 30	Benfica	1–0	Tirsense	Lisbon
18:30	Paulinho 56'	Report		Stadium: Estádio da Luz; Referee: Fortunato Azevedo

28 April 1990 31	Boavista	1–0	Benfica	Porto
20:00	Isaías 50'	Report		Stadium: Estádio do Bessa; Referee: Rosa Santos

6 May 1990 32	Benfica	4–2	União da Madeira	Lisbon
19:00	Paneira 14'; Magnusson 69', 90'; César Brito 71'	Report	Rogério 77'; Laudo 86'	Stadium: Estádio da Luz; Referee: Francisco Caroço

13 May 1990 33	Estrela da Amadora	0–1	Benfica	Amadora
19:00		Report	Magnusson 71' (pen.)	Stadium: Estádio José Gomes; Referee: Pinto Correia

20 May 1990 34	Benfica	1–0	Belenenses	Lisbon
20:00	Abel Campos 57'	Report		Stadium: Estádio da Luz; Referee: Manuel Nogueira

=== Taça de Portugal ===
9 December 1989 Third Rd	Rio Ave	1–4	Benfica	Vila do Conde
19:45	Karim 34'	Report	Vata 21'; Magnusson 44', 66'; Samuel 75'	Stadium: Estádio dos Arcos; Referee: Fortunato Azevedo

4 February 1990 Fourth Rd	Vitória de Setúbal	2–1	Benfica	Setúbal
20:15	Mladenov 70' (pen.), 76'	Report	Vítor Paneira 24'	Stadium: Estádio do Bonfim; Referee: Francisco Silva

=== European Cup ===
==== First round ====
13 September 1989 First leg	Derry City (Republic of Ireland)	1–2	(Portugal) Benfica	Derry
19:45	Carlyle 73'	Report	Thern 59'; Ricardo Gomes 64'	Stadium: Brandywell Stadium; Referee: Guy Goethals

27 September 1989 Second leg	Benfica (Portugal)	4–0 (6–1 agg.)	(Republic of Ireland) Derry City	Lisbon
19:45	Magnusson 32'; Vata 61'; Ricardo Gomes 69'; Aldair 80'	Report		Stadium: Estádio da Luz; Referee: Ildefonso Urizar Azpitarte

==== Second round ====
18 October 1989 First leg	Budapest Honvéd (Hungary)	0–2	(Portugal) Benfica	Budapest
19:45		Report	Pacheco 32' (pen.); Valdo 66'	Stadium: Bozsik Stadion; Referee: Keith Cooper

1 November 1989 Second leg	Benfica (Portugal)	7–0 (9–0 agg.)	(Hungary) Budapest Honvéd	Lisbon
19:45	César Brito 19', 42'; Abel Campos 36'; Vata 62', 64'; Magnusson 86', 89'	Report		Stadium: Estádio da Luz; Referee: Allan Gunn

==== Quarter-final ====
7 March 1990 First leg	Benfica (Portugal)	1–0	(Soviet Union) Dnipro Dnipropetrovsk	Lisbon
19:45	Magnusson 7' (pen.)	Report		Stadium: Estádio da Luz; Referee: Joël Quiniou

21 March 1990 Second leg	Dnipro Dnipropetrovsk (Soviet Union)	0–3 (0–4 agg.)	(Portugal) Benfica	Dnipropetrovsk
19:45		Report	Lima 55', 60'; Ricardo Gomes 86'	Stadium: Stadium Meteor; Referee: John Blankenstein

==== Semi-final ====
4 April 1990 First leg	Marseille (France)	2–1	(Portugal) Benfica	Marseille
19:45	Sauzée 12'; Papin 44'	Report	Lima 10'	Stadium: Stade Vélodrome; Referee: George Courtney

18 April 1990 Second leg	Benfica (Portugal)	1–0 (2–2 (a) agg.)	(France) Marseille	Lisbon
19:45	Vata 83'	Report		Stadium: Estádio da Luz; Attendance: 120,000; Referee: Marcel Van Langenhove

==== Final ====
23 May 1990	Milan (Italy)	1–0	(Portugal) Benfica	Vienna
21:15	Rijkaard 68'	Report		Stadium: Praterstadion; Attendance: 57,500; Referee: Helmut Kohl

=== Friendlies ===
1 August 1989	Unitas Gorinchem	1–6	Benfica	Gorinchem
	Goal		Luís Mariano 7'; Lima 34' (pen.); Hernâni 53'; Vata 55'; César Brito 63'; Abel Campos 70'

4 August 1989 Rotterdam TM	Fluminense	1–1	Benfica	Rotterdam
	Goal	Book Almanaque Tricolor	Chalana	Stadium: De Kuip; Attendance: 21.000; Referee: Uilenberg

6 August 1989 Rotterdam TM	Feyenoord	4–2	Benfica	Rotterdam
	Nortan 14'; Keur 28'; Dwight Blackson 50'; Blinker 78'		José Garrido 16'; Vítor Paneira 59'	Stadium: De Kuip; Referee: Ignace van Swieten

11 August 1989	NSVV	0–4	Benfica	Cromstrijen
			César Brito; Ademir Alcântara; Elzo

15 August 1989	Benfica	2–3	Spartak Moscow	Lisbon
	Hernâni 70'; Lima 75'		Shmarov 19'; Kuznetsov 43'; Rodionov 80'	Stadium: Estádio da Luz; Referee: Vítor Correia

17 August 1989 Trofeo Vigo	Celta de Vigo	1–2	Benfica	Vigo
	Goran Marić 36'		Abel Campos 70'; César Brito 84'	Stadium: Balaídos; Attendance: 7,000

18 August 1989 Trofeo Vigo	Benfica	1–0	Atlético de Madrid	Vigo
	Vítor Paneira 61' (pen.)			Stadium: Balaídos; Referee: Calvo Cordova

20 August 1989	Varzim	1–0	Benfica	Póvoa de Varzim
	Goal			Stadium: Estádio do Varzim SC

3 August 1989 Taça de Honra	Benfica	1–1 (3–4 p)	Sporting	Lisbon
	Vata 31'		Douglas 47'	Stadium: Estádio da Luz; Referee: António Marçal
	Penalties
	Fernando Mendes (penalty missed); António Pacheco (penalty missed)

17 September 1989 Taça de Honra	Benfica	4–2	Estrela da Amadora	Lisbon
	Diamantino 6'; Chico Oliveira 18' (o.g.); António Pacheco 72', 84'		Basaula Lemba 21'; Ricardo Lopes 37'	Stadium: Estádio da Luz; Referee: Jorge Coroado

2 January 1990 Lisbon TM	Benfica	0–2	Sporting	Lisbon
			Paulinho Cascavel 8', 55'	Stadium: Estádio da Luz; Attendance: António Marçal

9 January 1990 Lisbon TM	Benfica	3–1	PSV Eindhoven	Lisbon
	Lima 10', 72'; Paulo Sousa 55'		Romário 19'	Stadium: Estádio da Luz; Referee: Jorge Coroado

23 January 1990	Benfica	1–0	Marseille	Lisbon
	Vata			Stadium: Estádio da Luz; Referee: Pinto Correia

3 June 1990	Petro Atlético	0–1	Benfica	Luanda

5 June 1990	Costa do Sol	1–1	Benfica	Maputo
				Stadium: Estádio do Costa do Sol

== Player statistics ==
The squad for the season consisted of the players listed in the tables below, as well as staff members Sven-Göran Eriksson (manager) and Toni (assistant manager), Eusébio (assistant manager), José Capristano (director of football), Shéu (Secretary of football department), Bernardo Vasconcelos (doctor), Amílcar Miranda (doctor), Asterónimo Araújo (masseur), António Gaspar (physiotherapist), Jorge Castelo (scout), Luís Santos (kit man), José Luís (kit man).

Note 1: Note: Flags indicate national team as defined under FIFA eligibility rules. Players may hold more than one non-FIFA nationality.

Note 2: Players with squad numbers marked ‡ joined the club during the 1989-90 season via transfer, with more details in the following section.

No.	Pos	Nat	Player	Total		Primeira Divisão		Taça de Portugal		European Cup		Supertaça	
No.	Pos	Nat	Player	Apps	Goals	Apps	Goals	Apps	Goals	Apps	Goals	Apps	Goals
1	GK	(Portugal) POR	Manuel Bento	1	0	1	0	0	0	0	0	0	0
	GK	(Portugal) POR	Silvino	46	0	33	0	2	0	9	0	2	0
2	DF	(Portugal) POR	António Veloso	42	0	30	0	2	0	8	0	2	0
^{‡}	DF	(Portugal) POR	José Carlos	35	0	25	0	2	0	6	0	2	0
3	DF	(Brazil) BRA	Ricardo Gomes	25	5	16	2	1	0	8	3	0	0
	DF	(Portugal) POR	Álvaro Magalhães	2	0	2	0	0	0	0	0	0	0
	DF	(Portugal) POR	António Fonseca	10	0	8	0	0	0	2	0	0	0
	DF	(Portugal) POR	Samuel Quina	33	1	26	0	1	1	4	0	2	0
^{‡}	DF	(Portugal) POR	Paulinho	7	1	6	1	0	0	1	0	0	0
5^{‡}	DF	(Brazil) BRA	Aldair	33	6	22	5	2	0	8	1	1	0
^{‡}	DF	(Portugal) POR	Fernando Mendes	4	0	4	0	0	0	0	0	0	0
4	DF	(Portugal) POR	Paulo Madeira	8	0	7	0	0	0	0	0	1	0
6	MF	(Portugal) POR	Paulo Sousa	4	0	2	0	1	0	0	0	1	0
	MF	(Portugal) POR	Hernâni Neves	19	0	14	0	1	0	4	0	0	0
7	MF	(Portugal) POR	Vítor Paneira	38	4	26	3	2	1	8	0	2	0
	MF	(Angola) ANG	Abel Campos	25	6	18	5	0	0	5	1	2	0
10^{‡}	MF	(Sweden) SWE	Jonas Thern	33	3	21	2	2	0	9	1	1	0
	MF	(Portugal) POR	António Pacheco	41	5	30	4	2	0	7	1	2	0
	FW	(Angola) ANG	Vata	31	16	22	10	1	1	7	4	1	1
	FW	(Brazil) BRA	Adesvaldo Lima	16	7	12	3	0	0	3	3	1	1
8	MF	(Brazil) BRA	Valdo Filho	37	4	24	3	2	0	9	1	2	0
	MF	(Portugal) POR	Fernando Chalana	12	0	7	0	1	0	3	0	1	0
9	FW	(Sweden) SWE	Mats Magnusson	44	40	32	33	2	2	9	4	1	1
	MF	(Brazil) BRA	Ademir Alcântara	8	0	8	0	0	0	0	0	0	0
	MF	(Portugal) POR	Diamantino Miranda	21	0	15	0	2	0	3	0	1	0
11^{‡}	FW	(Portugal) POR	César Brito	29	7	25	5	0	0	4	2	0	0

== Transfers ==
=== In ===
Entry date	Position	Player	From club	Fee	Ref
31 May 1989	FW	César Brito	Portimonense	Loan return	
31 May 1989	DF	Paulinho	Estoril-Praia	Loan return	
14 June 1989	DF	Aldair	Flamengo	Undisclosed	
22 July 1989	MF	Fernando Mendes	Sporting CP	Free	
July 1989	DF	José Carlos	Portimonense	Loan return	
10 August 1989	MF	Jonas Thern	Malmö	Undisclosed	

=== Out ===
Exit date	Position	Player	To club	Fee	Ref
20 May 1989	FW	Ricky	Estrela da Amadora	Undisclosed	
22 May 1989	MF	Shéu	None	Retired	
6 June 1989	CB	Mozer	Olympique de Marseille	Undisclosed	
18 July 1989	MF	Tueba Menayane	Tirsense	Undisclosed	
29 July 1989	MF	Wando	Marítimo	Undisclosed	
16 August 1989	DF	José Garrido	Boavista	Undisclosed	
16 August 1989	MF	António Miranda	Chaves	Undisclosed	
August 1989	MF	Luís Mariano	União de Leiria		
8 September 1989	MF	Elzo Coelho	Palmeiras	Free	

=== Out by loan ===
Exit date	Position	Player	To club	Return date	Ref
July 1989	FW	João Pires	Estoril-Praia	30 June 1991	
July 1989	CB	Pedro Valido	Feirense	30 June 1990	
27 July 1989	DF	Edmundo	Belenenses	30 June 1990	
8 August 1989	MF	Augusto Jerónimo	Beira-Mar	30 June 1990	
16 August 1989	CB	Abel Silva	Penafiel	30 June 1990	
