= 1988–89 S.L. Benfica season =

Benfica
1988–89 season
- President: João Santos
- Head coach: Toni
- Stadium: Estádio da Luz
- Primeira Divisão: 1st
- Taça de Portugal: Runners-up
- UEFA Cup: Second round
- Top goalscorer: League: Vata (16); All: Vata (18)
Home colours

The 1988–89 season was Sport Lisboa e Benfica's 85th season in existence and the club's 55th consecutive season in the top flight of Portuguese football, covering the period from 1 July 1988 to 30 June 1989. Benfica competed domestically in the Primeira Divisão and the Taça de Portugal, and participated in the UEFA Cup after finishing second in the previous league.

After leading Benfica to their sixth European Cup final, Toni remained in charge of the team. He lost Rui Águas and Dito to Porto in a controversial case known as "Ademir affair"; but new signings such as Valdo Filho, Vata, Ricardo Gomes, and Ademir Alcântara helped guide the team to the 28th league title. Despite several draws in the first half of the season, and two losses between both halves, Benfica was much more regular. Several consecutive wins opened a six-point lead over Porto, with the title arriving on 7 May. Benfica also contested the 1989 Taça de Portugal final, but lost it to Belenenses.

== Season summary ==
Former assistant manager, Toni remained in charge of the team for the new season after leading them to the European Cup final. The off-season was marked by tension between Porto and Benfica, after the first signed Rui Águas and Dito, breaking a 20-year gentlemen's agreement of not signing each other's players. The dispute boiled down to the signing of Ademir Alcântara, with Porto accusing Benfica of stealing the player. It became known as the "Ademir affair". To replace Águas and Dito, Benfica signed Vata and Ricardo Gomes, and added Brazilian international Valdo Filho, amidst several others, including the aforementioned Ademir. The pre-season began on 18 July, with medical tests. The next day, Benfica travelled to Lamego for eleven days of training sessions. Afterwards, they embarked on a tour to the Netherlands, where they competed in the Amsterdam Tournament from 5 to 7 August. Their presentation game occurred on the 11 with Grêmio, and they closed the pre-season with a second tournament, the Marlboro Cup in New York. This caused the opening game with Penafiel, scheduled for 21 August to be postponed to 14 September.

Benfica league campaign started with two draws, followed by three wins which allowed them to reach first place, matched with Belenenses. They dropped to second after a draw with Marítimo but three more wins helped them regain first place, now isolated with a point in hand. Their next match was a Clássico with second-place Porto, ending in a draw. Until Christmas, Benfica increased their lead to four points. However, they lost for the first time in the next match, with Boavista, followed by a second consecutive loss with Penafiel, which did cause them to lose their first place because Porto also lost. In the following weeks, Benfica racked up wins and increased their lead to six points by March. The Clássico on the 29th match-day helped define the course of the remainder of the season. It was Porto's last hope of closing the gap, but Benfica did not concede and left with a draw. Porto manager Artur Jorge said that his team made Benfica look better than it was. Toni responded by saying that Benfica was as happy as Porto had been in Estádio da Luz. Five more consecutive wins and Benfica could have won the title at match-day 35, but drew two-equal with Vitória de Setúbal. A week later, Benfica beat Estrela da Amadora and confirmed their 28th league title. Vata, with only 16 goals won Bola de Prata for top scorer.

Nonetheless, there was still the 1989 Taça de Portugal final with Belenenses to play. The Belém-side scored first, but Vata levelled it in the 74th minute. A few minutes later, a goal from Juanico, gave the Cup to Belenenses. Diamantino Miranda said the reason Belenenses had won was of their excessive aggressiveness with referee Alder Dante complacent to everything. Toni in the other hand, already knew he was losing his position to Sven-Göran Eriksson. Shéu retired after 17-year career at the club.

== Competitions ==
Win Draw Loss Postponed

=== Overall record ===
Competition	First match	Last match	Record								
Competition	First match	Last match	G	W	D	L	GF	GA	GD	Win %	Source
Primeira Divisão	25 August 1990	26 May 1991	38	27	9	2	60	15	+45	71.05	
Taça de Portugal	27 February 1991	17 April 1991	7	6	0	1	42	7	+35	85.71	
UEFA Cup	19 September 1990	3 October 1990	4	2	1	1	8	4	+4	50.00	
Total			49	35	10	4	110	26	+84	71.43	

=== Primeira Divisão ===
==== League table ====
Pos	Team	Pld	W	D	L	GF	GA	GD	Pts	Qualification or relegation
1	Benfica (C)	38	27	9	2	60	15	+45	63	Qualification to European Cup first round
2	Porto	38	21	14	3	52	17	+35	56	Qualification to UEFA Cup first round
3	Boavista	38	19	11	8	56	29	+27	49	Qualification to UEFA Cup first round
4	Sporting CP	38	18	9	11	50	33	+17	45	Qualification to UEFA Cup first round
5	Vitória de Setúbal	38	15	12	11	44	37	+7	42	

Source: foradejogo.net, RSSSF
Rules for classification: 1st points, 2nd head-to-head, 3rd goals average
(C) Champions

==== Results by round ====
Round	1	2	3	4	5	6	7	8	9	10	11	12	13	14	15	16	17	18	19	20	21	22	23	24	25	26	27	28	29	30	31	32	33	34	35	36	37	38
Ground	H	A	H	A	H	A	H	A	A	H	A	H	A	H	A	H	A	H	A	A	H	A	H	A	H	A	H	H	A	H	A	H	A	H	A	H	A	H
Result	W	D	D	W	W	D	W	W	W	D	W	D	D	W	W	W	W	W	L	L	W	W	W	W	W	W	W	W	D	W	W	W	W	W	D	W	W	D
Position	4	6	10	6	2	2	1	1	1	1	1	1	1	1	1	1	1	1	1	1	1	1	1	1	1	1	1	1	1	1	1	1	1	1	1	1	1	1

Source: ForaDeJogo
A = Away; H = Home; W = Win; D = Draw; L = Loss

==== Matches ====
21 August 1988 1	Benfica	Postponed	Penafiel	Lisbon
19:45		Report		Stadium: Estádio da Luz

28 August 1988 2	Espinho	2–2	Benfica	Espinho
19:00	Pingo 40'; Ivan 86'	Report	Vata 52'; Magnusson 74'	Stadium: Estádio Comendador Manuel Violas; Attendance: 10,000; Referee: Rosa Santos

3 September 1988 3	Benfica	0–0	Vitória de Guimarães	Lisbon
19:30		Report		Stadium: Estádio da Luz; Attendance: 60,000; Referee: José Pratas

11 September 1988 4	Portimonense	0–1	Benfica	Portimão
19:45		Report	Vata 76'	Stadium: Estádio Municipal de Portimão; Attendance: 6,000; Referee: Fortunato Azevedo

14 September 1988 1	Benfica	2–1	Penafiel	Lisbon
19:45	Ademir 8'; Vata 15'	Report	Rui Manuel 67'	Stadium: Estádio da Luz; Attendance: 25,000; Referee: Francisco Silva

18 September 1988 5	Benfica	4–0	Académico de Viseu	Lisbon
19:30	Chalana 45'; Vata 51', 81'; Valdo 90'	Report		Stadium: Estádio da Luz; Attendance: 40,000; Referee: Ezequiel Feijão

25 September 1988 6	Marítimo	1–1	Benfica	Funchal
19:00	Paulo Ricardo 88'	Report	Vata 43'	Stadium: Estádio dos Barreiros; Attendance: 10,000; Referee: Fernando Alberto

1 October 1988 7	Benfica	3–0	Farense	Lisbon
19:00	Garrido 7'; Veloso 46'; Vata 66'	Report		Stadium: Estádio da Luz; Attendance: 40,000; Referee: Bento Marques

9 October 1988 8	Belenenses	0–1	Benfica	Lisbon
19:30		Report	Chalana 25' (pen.)	Stadium: Estádio do Restelo; Attendance: 25,000; Referee: Pinto Correia

16 October 1988 9	Fafe	0–2	Benfica	Fafe
19:00		Report	Paneira 55'; Vata 89'	Stadium: Parque Municipal dos Desportos de Fafe; Attendance: 10,000; Referee: Alder Dante

23 October 1988 10	Benfica	0–0	Porto	Lisbon
20:00		Report		Stadium: Estádio da Luz; Attendance: 110,000; Referee: Carlos Valente

29 October 1988 11	Leixões	0–2	Benfica	Matosinhos
19:00		Report	Veloso 47'; Amarildo 62' (o.g.)	Stadium: Estádio do Mar; Attendance: 10,000; Referee: Ezequiel Feijão

5 November 1988 12	Benfica	0–0	Beira Mar	Lisbon
19:30		Report		Stadium: Estádio da Luz; Attendance: 40,000; Referee: José Garcia

20 November 1988 13	Braga	0–0	Benfica	Braga
19:00		Report		Stadium: Estádio 1º de Maio; Attendance: 10,000; Referee: Rosa Santos

27 November 1988 14	Benfica	2–1	Desportivo de Chaves	Lisbon
20:00	Mozer 71'; Pacheco 85' (pen.)	Report	Luís Saura 81'	Stadium: Estádio da Luz; Attendance: 30,000; Referee: Alder Dante

30 November 1988 15	Nacional	0–1	Benfica	Funchal
19:00		Report	Pacheco 63'	Stadium: Estádio dos Barreiros; Attendance: 10,000; Referee: Francisco Silva

4 December 1988 16	Benfica	2–0	Vitória de Setúbal	Lisbon
19:45	Ricardo Gomes 31'; Hernâni 66'	Report		Stadium: Estádio da Luz; Attendance: 30,000; Referee: Bento Marques

11 December 1988 17	Estrela da Amadora	1–2	Benfica	Amadora
19:00	Marlon Brandão 39'	Report	Lima 60'; Magnusson 67'	Stadium: Estádio José Gomes; Attendance: 10,00; Referee: Fortunato Azevedo

18 December 1988 18	Benfica	2–0	Sporting	Lisbon
20:00	Magnusson 42'; Pacheco 62'	Report		Stadium: Estádio da Luz; Attendance: 100,000; Referee: Vítor Correia

31 December 1988 19	Boavista	2–1	Benfica	Maia
20:00	Elói 47' (pen.); Jorge Andrade 86' (pen.)	Report	Vata 82'	Stadium: Estádio Prof. Dr. José Vieira de Carvalho; Attendance: 20,000; Referee: José Pratas

8 January 1989 20	Penafiel	1–0	Benfica	Penafiel
19:00	Amâncio 50'	Report		Stadium: Estádio Municipal 25 de Abril; Attendance: 7,000; Referee: Rosa Santos

15 January 1989 21	Benfica	1–0	Espinho	Lisbon
20:00	Ricardo Gomes 47'	Report		Stadium: Estádio da Luz; Attendance: 35,000; Referee: Miranda de Sousa

22 January 1989 22	Vitória Guimarães	1–2	Benfica	Guimarães
19:00	João Batista 51' (pen.)	Report	Magnusson 25'; Pacheco 35'	Stadium: Estádio D. Afonso Henriques; Attendance: 28,000; Referee: Alder Dante

29 January 1989 23	Benfica	3–0	Portimonense	Lisbon
20:00	Valdo 24'; Ademir 32'; Diamantino 88'	Report		Stadium: Estádio da Luz; Attendance: 35,000; Referee: Ezequiel Feijão

4 February 1989 24	Académico de Viseu	0–1	Benfica	Viseu
19:30		Report	Ricardo Gomes 90'	Stadium: Estádio do Fontelo; Attendance: 10,000; Referee: Carlos Valente

7 February 1989 25	Benfica	2–0	Marítimo	Lisbon
19:00	Magnusson 13'; Abel Campos 90'	Report		Stadium: Estádio da Luz; Attendance: 45,000; Referee: Bento Marques

19 February 1989 26	Farense	0–2	Benfica	Faro
20:15		Report	Ricardo Gomes 85'; Vata 89'	Stadium: Estádio de São Luís; Attendance: 15,000; Referee: Carlos Valente

26 February 1989 27	Benfica	1–0	Belenenses	Lisbon
19:00	Vata 87'	Report		Stadium: Estádio da Luz; Attendance: 40,000; Referee: Francisco Silva

4 March 1989 28	Benfica	4–0	Fafe	Lisbon
20:00	Fonseca 27'; Diamantino 30', 54'; Vata 85'	Report		Stadium: Estádio da Luz; Attendance: 30,000; Referee: Francisco Caroço

12 March 1989 29	Porto	0–0	Benfica	Porto
20:30		Report	Pacheco (yellow card) 72' (yellow-red card) 80'	Stadium: Estádio das Antas; Attendance: 80,000; Referee: Rosa Santos

19 March 1989 30	Benfica	2–1	Leixões	Lisbon
19:30	Ricardo Gomes 87'; Pacheco 89' (pen.)	Report	Moreira de Sá 41'	Stadium: Estádio da Luz; Attendance: 35,000; Referee: Teixeira Dória

25 March 1989 31	Beira-Mar	0–1	Benfica	Aveiro
19:00		Report	Magnusson 55'	Stadium: Estádio Mário Duarte; Attendance: 10,000; Referee: Fortunato Azevedo

2 April 1989 32	Benfica	1–0	Braga	Lisbon
19:00	Abel Campos 87'	Report		Stadium: Estádio da Luz; Attendance: 50,000; Referee: Alder Dante

9 April 1989 33	Desportivo de Chaves	0–2	Benfica	Chaves
19:00		Report	Ricardo Gomes 15'; Ademir 17'	Stadium: Estádio Municipal de Chaves; Attendance: 20,000; Referee: Miranda de Sousa

16 April 1989 34	Benfica	1–0	Nacional	Lisbon
19:00	Vata 25'	Report		Stadium: Estádio da Luz; Attendance: 30,000; Referee: Mário Leal

30 April 1989 35	Vitória de Setúbal	2–2	Benfica	Setúbal
20:30	Aparício 65', 84'	Report	53' Ademir; 75' Ricardo Gomes	Stadium: Estádio do Bonfim; Attendance: 10,000; Referee: Rosa Santos

7 May 1989 36	Benfica	3–0	Estrela da Amadora	Lisbon
19:00	Vata 13'; Ricardo Gomes 74'; Mozer 88'	Report		Stadium: Estádio da Luz; Attendance: 60,000; Referee: Jorge Coroado

14 May 1989 37	Sporting	0–2	Benfica	Lisbon
21:00		Report	13' Valdo; 25' Abel Campos	Stadium: Estádio de Alvalade; Attendance: 60,000; Referee: Fernando Alberto

20 May 1989 38	Benfica	2–2	Boavista	Lisbon
19:45	Vata 4', 87'	Report	68' (pen.) Isaías; 72' Jaime Alves	Stadium: Estádio da Luz; Attendance: 80,000; Referee: José Pratas

=== Taça de Portugal ===
1 November 1988 Second Rd (Note: This match and his statistics are missing from Almanaque do Benfica.)	Benfica	9–1	Cova da Piedade	Lisbon
19:45	Magnusson 8', 17', 61'; Lima 22'; Hernâni 44'; Pacheco 64', 67' (pen.); Abel Campos 80', 85'		Goal	Stadium: Estádio da Luz

21 December 1988 Third Rd	Vitória de Setúbal	2–3 (a.e.t.)	Benfica	Setúbal
20:30	Aparício 90'; Cadete 100'	Report	Pacheco 51' (pen.); Abel 109'; Diamantino 114'	Stadium: Estádio do Bonfim; Attendance: 5,000; Referee: Alder Dante

11 January 1989 Fourth Rd	Benfica	14–1	Atlético Riachense	Lisbon
19:30	Direito 1' (o.g.); Lima 28'; Ricky 36', 44', 55', 68', 79'; Garrido 48'; Ademir 56', 66'; Miranda 69'; Pacheco 70', 84'	Report	Tochinha 89'	Stadium: Estádio da Luz; Attendance: 10,000; Referee: Juvenal Silvestre

22 February 1989 Fifth Rd	CD Luso	0–1	Benfica	Águeda
19:45		Report	Diamantino 72'	Stadium: Estádio Municipal de Águeda; Attendance: 2,000; Referee: João Simãozinho

8 March 1989 Quarter-final	Benfica	11–0	Marco	Lisbon
19:30	Diamantino 22', 44'; Magnusson 30', 36', 76'; Paneira 47'; Garrido 49'; Lima 51', 80'; Miranda 74'	Report		Stadium: Estádio da Luz; Attendance: 30,000; Referee: Mário Leal

12 April 1989 Semi-final	Benfica	3–1	Braga	Lisbon
19:00	Lima 52'; Vata 75'; Valdo 89'	Report	Santos 30'	Stadium: Estádio da Luz; Attendance: 40,000; Referee: Carlos Valente

28 May 1989 Final	Belenenses	2–1	Benfica	Oeiras
19:30	Faria 25'; Juanico 81'	Report	Vata 74'	Stadium: Estádio Nacional; Attendance: 25,000; Referee: Alder Dante

=== UEFA Cup ===
==== First round ====
7 September 1988 First leg	Montpellier	0–3	Benfica	Montpellier
20:30		Report	Hernâni 9'; Abel Campos 44'; Valdo 83'	Stadium: Stade de la Mosson; Referee: Manfred Neuner

5 October 1988 Second leg	Benfica	3–1 (6–1 agg.)	Montpellier	Lisbon
21:00	Chalana 22'; Ademir Alcântara 51'; Carlos Mozer 73'	Report	Cubaynes 83'	Stadium: Estádio da Luz; Referee: Carlo Longhi

==== Second round ====
26 October 1988 First leg	Liège	2–1	Benfica	Liège
20:00	Varga 58'; Malbaša 68'	Report	Chalana 46'	Stadium: Stade Maurice Dufrasne; Referee: Thorbjorn Aass

9 November 1988 Second leg	Benfica	1–1 (2–3 agg.)	Liège	Lisbon
21:30	Valdo 58'	Report	Veyt 20'	Stadium: Estádio da Luz; Referee: Günther Habermann

=== Friendlies ===
2 August 1988	Excelsior Maassluis	0–0	Benfica	Maassluis
				Stadium: Lavendelstraat

5 August 1988 Amsterdam TM	Sampdoria	5–1	Benfica	Amsterdam
	Vialli; Mancini; Dossena		Mozer	Stadium: Olympic Stadium

7 August 1988 Amsterdam TM	Flamengo	2-0	Benfica	Amsterdam
				Stadium: Olympic Stadium

11 August 1988	Benfica	2–2	Grêmio	Lisbon
	Mozer 32'; Magnusson 85'		Jorginho 58', 68'	Stadium: Estádio da Luz; Referee: Jorge Coroado

15 August 1988	Benfica	1–0	Estrela da Amadora	Lisbon
	Mozer			Stadium: Estádio da Luz

19 August 1988 Marlboro C	Sporting Cristal	1–1 (6–5 p)	Benfica	New York City
	César Loyola		Mozer	Stadium: Giants Stadium; Attendance: 23,821; Referee: Vincent Mauro

21 August 1988 Marlboro C	Benfica	3–2	Nacional	New York City
	Magnusson; Vata 77'		John Jairo Tréllez 74'; Jaime Arango	Stadium: Giants Stadium; Attendance: 27,433

19 October 1988	Benfica	2–1	Kuwait	Lisbon
	Lima 19'; Pacheco 74' (pen.)		Fahed Kameel 78'	Stadium: Estádio da Luz; Referee: António Marçal

14 November 1988	Paris Saint-Germain	1–1	Benfica	Saint-Ouen
	Simba 87'		Ademir 58'	Stadium: Stade Municipal; Referee: Joël Quiniou

11 February 1989	Benfica	2–1	CFKA Sredets	Lisbon
	Magnusson 35'; Ricky 89'		Kostadinov 51'	Stadium: Estádio da Luz; Referee: Sepa Santos

2 June 1989 Marlboro C	United States	2–1	Benfica	New York City
	Steve Trittschuh 28'; Philip Gyau 35'		Valdo 54'	Stadium: Giants Stadium; Attendance: 28,717; Referee: Derek Daglas

4 June 1989 Marlboro C	Benfica	2–1	América de Cali	New York City
	Valdo; Ricardo		Miguel Prince	Stadium: Giants Stadium; Attendance: 33,133

7 June 1989	Benfica	3–1	Toronto Italia	Toronto
	Lima 23'; Vata 73', 88'		Morrison 49'	Stadium: Varsity Stadium

11 June 1989	Benfica	3–2	Monarcas Morelia	San José
	Vata; Lima		Dúran; Juan Vera	Stadium: CEFCU Stadium

17 June 1989 President's Cup	Benfica	2–0	Hungary XI	Seoul
	Vata 13'; Ademir 62'

19 June 1989 President's Cup	South Korea	2–0	Benfica	Daejeon
	Choi Soon-ho 55'; Cho Keung-yeon 83'

21 June 1989 President's Cup	Benfica	2–0	United States U21	Gwangju
	Miranda 41'; Ademir 75'		Ken Snow 22'

24 June 1989 President's Cup	Benfica	2–5	Czechoslovak League XI	Pusan
	Lima 78', 82'		Pavel Cerný 23', 40'; Radek Drulák 50'; Michal Hipp 70'; Vladimír Weiss 76'

26 June 1989 President's Cup	Benfica	0–3	Brøndby	Seoul

== Player statistics ==
The squad for the season consisted of the players listed in the tables below, as well as staff member Toni (manager), Jesualdo Ferreira (assistant manager), Eusébio (assistant manager), Gaspar Ramos (Director of Football), Bernardo Vasconcelos (Doctor), Amílcar Miranda (Doctor), Asterónimo Araújo (Masseur), Manuel Jorge (Physiotherapist).

Note 1: Note: Flags indicate national team as defined under FIFA eligibility rules. Players may hold more than one non-FIFA nationality.

Note 2: Players with squad numbers marked ‡ joined the club during the 1988-89 season via transfer, with more details in the following section.

No.	Pos	Nat	Player	Total		Primeira Divisão		Taça de Portugal		UEFA Cup	
No.	Pos	Nat	Player	Apps	Goals	Apps	Goals	Apps	Goals	Apps	Goals
1	GK	(Portugal) POR	Manuel Bento	1	0	0	0	1	0	0	0
1	GK	(Portugal) POR	Silvino	47	0	38	0	5	0	4	0
1	GK	(Brazil) BRA	Dias Graça	1	0	0	0	1	0	0	0
2	DF	(Portugal) POR	António Veloso	46	2	37	2	5	0	4	0
2	DF	(Portugal) POR	Abel Silva	2	0	1	0	1	0	0	0
3	DF	(Portugal) POR	Álvaro Magalhães	16	0	11	0	1	0	4	0
3	DF	(Brazil) BRA	Carlos Mozer	36	3	30	2	3	0	3	1
3^{‡}	DF	(Brazil) BRA	Ricardo Gomes	39	8	31	8	4	0	4	0
4	DF	(Portugal) POR	Samuel Quina	18	0	14	0	4	0	0	0
4^{‡}	DF	(Portugal) POR	José Garrido	16	3	11	1	4	2	1	0
5	DF	(Portugal) POR	António Fonseca	33	1	27	1	6	0	0	0
6	MF	(Brazil) BRA	Elzo Coelho	20	0	16	0	1	0	3	0
6^{‡}	MF	(Portugal) POR	Hernâni Neves	18	1	13	0	2	1	3	0
7^{‡}	MF	(Portugal) POR	Vítor Paneira	40	2	32	1	4	1	4	0
7^{‡}	MF	(Angola) ANG	Abel Campos	38	5	31	3	5	1	2	1
8	MF	(Portugal) POR	António Pacheco	34	9	26	5	6	4	2	0
9^{‡}	FW	(Angola) ANG	Vata	34	18	27	16	4	2	3	0
9^{‡}	FW	(Brazil) BRA	Adesvaldo Lima	26	8	19	1	6	6	1	1
9^{‡}	FW	(Nigeria) NGA	Ricky	6	6	4	0	2	6	0	0
10^{‡}	MF	(Brazil) BRA	Valdo Filho	35	5	28	3	4	1	3	1
10	MF	(Portugal) POR	Luís Mariano	2	0	1	0	1	0	0	0
10^{‡}	MF	(Portugal) POR	António Miranda	9	2	6	0	3	2	0	0
10	MF	(Portugal) POR	Fernando Chalana	18	4	14	2	0	0	4	2
11	MF	(Portugal) POR	Shéu	6	0	4	0	2	0	0	0
11	FW	(Sweden) SWE	Mats Magnusson	36	12	27	6	6	6	3	0
11^{‡}	MF	(Brazil) BRA	Ademir Alcântara	26	7	22	4	2	2	2	1
11	MF	(Portugal) POR	Diamantino Miranda	27	7	21	3	5	4	1	0

== Transfers ==
=== In ===
Entry date	Position	Player	From club	Fee	Ref
18 May 1988	MF	Abel Campos	Petro Atlético	Undisclosed	
23 June 1988	MF	Valdo Filho	Grêmio	Undisclosed	
5 July 1988	MF	Vata	Varzim	Undisclosed	
5 July 1988	MF	António Miranda	Varzim	Undisclosed	
18 July 1988	DF	Ademir Alcântara	Vitória de Guimarães	Undisclosed	
19 July 1988	MF	Vítor Paneira	Vizela	Loan return	
3 August 1988	DF	Ricardo Gomes	Fluminense	Undisclosed	
11 August 1988	MF	Hernâni Neves	Vitória Setúbal	Undisclosed	
11 August 1988	DF	José Garrido	Chaves	Undisclosed	
11 August 1988	FW	Ricky	Metz	Undisclosed	
15 August 1989	FW	Adesvaldo Lima	Grêmio	Undisclosed	

=== Out ===
Exit date	Position	Player	To club	Fee	Ref
17 June 1988	GK	Delgado	Espinho	Free	
20 June 1988	MF	Adelino Nunes	Marítimo	Undisclosed	
2 July 1988	FW	Rui Águas	Porto	Free	
2 July 1988	DF	Dito	Porto	Free	
18 July 1988	GK	Neno	Vitória de Guimarães	Undisclosed	
29 July 1988	MF	Chiquinho Carlos	Vitória de Guimarães	Undisclosed	
July 1988	FW	Marlos Antunes	Bragança	Undisclosed	
July 1988	DF	Nuno Damas	Varzim	Undisclosed	
July 1988	DF	Paulo Guilherme	Estoril Praia	Undisclosed	
August 1988	MF	Hajry Redouane	Farense	Undisclosed	
14 September 1988	DF	Carlos Pereira	Farense	Free	

=== Out by loan ===
Exit date	Position	Player	To club	Return date	Ref
20 June 1988	DF	Edmundo	Vitória Setúbal	30 June 1989	
20 June 1988	MF	Tueba Menayane	Vitória Setúbal	30 June 1989	
25 June 1988	MF	Augusto Jerónimo	Portimonense	30 June 1989	
14 July 1988	FW	Tó Portela	Penafiel	30 June 1989	
19 July 1988	MF	Wando	Vitória Setúbal	30 June 1989	
27 July 1988	MF	Paulo Padinha	Fafe	30 June 1989	
July 1988	CB	Pedro Valido	Estoril-Praia	30 June 1989	
July 1988	DF	José Carlos	Portimonense	30 June 1989	
21 January 1988	FW	César Brito	Portimonense	30 June 1989	
