= 1990–91 S.L. Benfica season =

Benfica
1990–91 season
- President: João Santos
- Head coach: Sven-Göran Eriksson
- Stadium: Estádio da Luz
- Primeira Divisão: 1st
- Taça de Portugal: Quarter-finals
- UEFA Cup: Second round
- Top goalscorer: League: Rui Águas (25); All: Rui Águas (26)
Home colours

The 1990–91 season was Sport Lisboa e Benfica's 87th season in existence and the club's 57th consecutive season in the top flight of Portuguese football, covering the period from 1 July 1990 to 30 June 1991. Benfica competed domestically in the Primeira Divisão and the Taça de Portugal, and participated in the UEFA Cup after finishing second in the previous league.

With only a Supertaça Cândido de Oliveira won in the past season, Benfica was keen on retake the Primeira Divisão title again. They were quickly eliminated from Europe at the hands of Roma, so all attentions were pointed on the league title. A strong campaign witnessed Benfica overtake Porto in February and then close the title with an away win in the Clássico, a controversial match because of the tactics employed by Porto to destabilize the team. On late May, Benfica secured their 29th league title, while Rui Águas won the Bola de Prata for league top-scorer.

== Season summary ==
Benfica started the new season after having lost their fifth European Cup final in the past season, while Porto regained the league title back. Swedish manager Sven-Göran Eriksson made some squad adjustments, releasing established players like Fernando Chalana, Diamantino Miranda and Álvaro Magalhães, and losing Aldair to Roma. He nearly lost Valdo too, but Benfica and Fiorentina failed to agree terms. To counter the departures, he brought back Rui Águas, from Porto, Neno from Vitória de Guimarães, alongside William, and also added Isaías and Stefan Schwarz. Tomas Brolin was also a target but Eriksson thought he was not ready to play for a club like Benfica.

The pre-season started in Portugal on 16 July, followed by a tour in Sweden from 22 July to 5 August. Benfica would then play a presentation game on the 9th with Belenenses, take part on the Teresa Herrera Trophy from 17 until 19th, and closed pre-season with a match against Roma on the 22nd. The league campaign started in the best of terms as the team racked up wins in September and October. However, in Europe Benfica did not fare as well and were knocked-out of the UEFA Cup by Roma in the first round.

With only the domestic competitions to fight for, Benfica lost for the first and only time in the league on 3 November in Setúbal. The local Vitória played very aggressively, injuring three players from Benfica within the first 35 minutes: first Stefan Schwarz, followed by Fernando Mendes and then Vítor Paneira. They were forced to play with only 10 men for remaining 55 minutes, since they spent its two substitutions on Schwarz and Mendes. Benfica reacted with four consecutive wins until the Clássico where it draw 2–2 in another violent match. They followed with an away win in Alvalade, but lost a point with Farense who played their home match in Estádio do Bonfim to intimidate Benfica after they recent loss there.

Lapping the first round only two points behind Porto, Benfica only lost two points from two draws in the final 19 matches, and won every game from match-day 23 to 34, including a title defining Clássico in Estádio das Antas. The match was highly controversial because of the war-like tactics that Porto employed: Rocks were thrown at the team bus; the players had to walk to the locker room between a corridor of angry Porto fans; the locker room was sprayed with a chemical that made it impossible to use, with Benfica being forced to get dressed in the access tunnel; the pitch was flooded to prevent the ball from rolling. Pinto da Costa allegedly said to Eriksson "Mr. Eriksson, I like you, but war is war". Despite this, Benfica won 2–0 with goals from César Brito and opened a three-point gap. A few days before, Porto had beat Benfica by 2–1 for the Portuguese Cup, eliminating them.

Despite a home draw with Sporting in the aftermath of the Clássico, Benfica did not let the title slip and on 26 May it won its 29th league title. William played every minute of the campaign, narrowly surpassing Rui Águas, who collected the Bola de Prata for his 25 league goals. According to Eriksson, he should have left then, on a high.

== Competitions ==
Win Draw Loss Postponed

=== Overall record ===
Competition	First match	Last match	Record								
Competition	First match	Last match	G	W	D	L	GF	GA	GD	Win %	Source
Primeira Divisão	25 August 1990	26 May 1991	38	32	5	1	89	18	+71	84.21	
Taça de Portugal	27 February 1991	17 April 1991	4	3	0	1	9	5	+4	75.00	
UEFA Cup	19 September 1990	3 October 1990	2	0	0	2	0	2	−2	0.00	
Total			44	35	5	4	98	25	+73	79.55	

=== Primeira Divisão ===
==== League table ====
Pos	Team	Pld	W	D	L	GF	GA	GD	Pts	Qualification or relegation
1	Benfica (C)	38	32	5	1	89	18	+71	69	Qualification to European Cup first round
2	Porto	38	31	5	2	77	22	+55	67	Qualification to Cup Winners' Cup first round (Note: Porto qualified for the Cup Winners' Cup as Portuguese Cup winners)
3	Sporting CP	38	24	8	6	58	23	+35	56	Qualification to UEFA Cup first round
4	Boavista	38	15	11	12	53	46	+7	41	Qualification to UEFA Cup first round
5	Salgueiros	38	12	12	14	32	48	−16	36	Qualification to UEFA Cup first round

Source: Primeira Divisão
Rules for classification: 1st points, 2nd head-to-head, 3rd goals average
(C) Champions

==== Results by round ====
Round	1	2	3	4	5	6	7	8	9	10	11	12	13	14	15	16	17	18	19	20	21	22	23	24	25	26	27	28	29	30	31	32	33	34	35	36	37	38
Ground	H	A	H	A	H	A	H	A	H	A	H	A	H	A	H	A	A	H	A	A	H	A	H	A	H	A	H	A	H	A	H	A	H	A	H	H	A	H
Result	W	W	W	W	D	W	W	W	W	L	W	W	W	W	D	W	D	W	W	W	W	D	W	W	W	W	W	W	W	W	W	W	W	W	D	W	W	W
Position	2	2	2	3	3	3	2	2	2	3	3	3	3	2	2	2	2	2	2	2	2	2	1	1	1	1	1	1	1	1	1	1	1	1	1	1	1	1

Source: Foradejogo.net
A = Away; H = Home; W = Win; D = Draw; L = Loss

==== Matches ====
18 August 1990 (Note: Postponed due to Benfica's request) 1	Benfica	Postponed	Gil Vicente	Lisbon
				Stadium: Estádio da Luz

25 August 1990 2	Vitória de Guimarães	0–2	Benfica	Braga
19:45		Report	Schwarz 4'; Jonas Thern 43'	Stadium: Estádio 1º de Maio; Referee: José Pratas

2 September 1990 3	Benfica	2–0	Penafiel	Lisbon
19:00	Rui Águas 40', 55'	Report		Stadium: Estádio da Luz; Referee: Juvenal Silvestre

15 September 1990 4	Salgueiros	0–3	Benfica	Maia
19:00		Report	Valdo 13'; Isaías 51', 85'	Stadium: Estádio Prof. Dr. José Vieira de Carvalho; Referee: Fortunato Azevedo

23 September 1990 5	Benfica	1–1	Boavista	Lisbon
20:00	Rui Águas 2'	Report	Phil Walker 19'	Stadium: Estádio da Luz; Referee: Rosa Santos

29 September 1990 6	Belenenses	0–2	Benfica	Lisbon
20:15		Report	Ricardo Gomes 18'; Rui Águas 53'	Stadium: Estádio do Restelo; Referee: Miranda de Sousa

7 October 1990 7	Benfica	4–0	Estrela da Amadora	Lisbon
20:00	Rui Águas 11', 87'; Pacheco 47'; Valdo 75'	Report		Stadium: Estádio da Luz; Referee: Ezequiel Feijão

21 October 1990 8	União da Madeira	0–2	Benfica	Funchal
19:00		Report	Ricardo Gomes 13'; Schwarz 15'	Stadium: Estádio dos Barreiros; Referee: Mário Leal

27 October 1990 9	Benfica	3–0	Nacional	Lisbon
19:30	Rui Águas 24'; Schwarz 49', 76'	Report		Stadium: Estádio da Luz; Referee: Carlos Valente

31 October 1990 1	Benfica	3–0	Gil Vicente	Lisbon
20:00	Vítor Paneira 18'; Ricardo Gomes 48'; Rui Águas 62' (pen.)	Report		Stadium: Estádio da Luz; Referee: Miranda de Sousa

3 November 1990 10	Vitória de Setúbal	2–0	Benfica	Setúbal
20:15	Jorge Ferreira 7'; Adelino Nunes 72'	Report		Stadium: Estádio do Bonfim; Referee: Soares Dias

10 November 1990 11	Benfica	1–0	Famalicão	Lisbon
19:00	Rui Águas 67'	Report		Stadium: Estádio da Luz; Referee: José Filipe

14 November 1990 12	Braga	1–3	Benfica	Braga
19:45	Nedialko Mladenov 44'	Report	Pacheco 20'; Rui Águas 62', 86'	Stadium: Estádio 1º de Maio; Referee: José Pratas

18 November 1990 13	Benfica	1–0	Desportivo de Chaves	Lisbon
20:00	Rui Águas 67'	Report		Stadium: Estádio da Luz; Referee: João Mesquita

24 November 1990 14	Tirsense	1–3	Benfica	Santo Tirso
19:15	Lay 86' (pen.)	Report	Ricardo Gomes 28'; Valdo 52'; Isaías 70'	Stadium: Estádio Abel Alves de Figueiredo; Referee: Carlos Valente

2 December 1990 15	Benfica	2–2	Porto	Lisbon
20:00	Ricardo Gomes 11'; Rui Águas 68'	Report	Domingos Paciência 57'; Kostadinov 72'	Stadium: Estádio da Luz; Referee: Rosa Santos

8 December 1990 16	Sporting	0–2	Benfica	Lisbon
20:00		Report	Isaías 30'; César Brito 87'	Stadium: Estádio de Alvalade; Referee: Vítor Correia

15 December 1990 17	Farense	2–2	Benfica	Setúbal
20:15	Pitico 7'; Curcic 9'	Report	Vata 45', 47'	Stadium: Estádio do Bonfim; Referee: Fortunato Azevedo

23 December 1990 18	Benfica	3–1	Marítimo	Lisbon
19:00	William 15'; Ricardo Gomes 40'; Valdo 80'	Report	Guedes 65'	Stadium: Estádio da Luz; Referee: Donato Ramos

30 December 1990 19	Beira-Mar	0–1	Benfica	Aveiro
20:15		Report	Vítor Paneira 12'	Stadium: Estádio Mário Duarte; Referee: José Pratas

6 January 1991 20	Gil Vicente	2–3	Benfica	Barcelos
20:15	Zé Carlos 58' (pen.); Rosado 84'	Report	Vata 8'; Rui Águas 25' (pen.); William 44'	Stadium: Estádio Adelino Ribeiro Novo; Referee: Rosa Santos

12 January 1991 21	Benfica	2–0	Vitória Guimarães	Lisbon
19:30	Vítor Paneira 10'; Erwin Sánchez 65'	Report		Stadium: Estádio da Luz; Referee: Miranda de Sousa

27 January 1991 22	Penafiel	1–1	Benfica	Penafiel
19:00	Abel Silva 62'	Report	Jonas Thern 2'	Stadium: Estádio Municipal 25 de Abril; Referee: Juvenal Silvestre

2 February 1991 23	Benfica	4–0	Salgueiros	Lisbon
19:45	Vítor Paneira 61', 89'; Rui Águas 72'; Magnusson 82'	Report		Stadium: Estádio da Luz; Referee: Veiga Trigo

24 February 1991 24	Boavista	1–2	Benfica	Porto
20:00	Nélson Bertollazzi 56' (pen.)	Report	Jonas Thern 43'; Rui Águas 84'	Stadium: Estádio do Bessa; Referee: Rosa Santos

3 March 1991 25	Benfica	2–0	Belenenses	Lisbon
18:00	Vítor Paneira 28'; Rui Águas 85' (pen.)	Report		Stadium: Estádio da Luz; Referee: Vítor Pereira

10 March 1991 26	Estrela da Amadora	1–4	Benfica	Amadora
20:30	Ricky 32'	Report	Ricardo Gomes 58'; William 61'; Rui Águas 75'; Valério 86' (o.g.)	Stadium: Estádio José Gomes; Referee: Pinto Correia

17 March 1991 27	Benfica	4–1	União da Madeira	Lisbon
20:00	Ricardo Gomes 44', 71'; Rui Águas 69'; Vítor Paneira 76'	Report	Lepinjica 67'	Stadium: Estádio da Luz; Referee: Fortunato Azevedo

23 March 1991 28	Nacional	0–2	Benfica	Funchal
19:00		Report	Vítor Paneira 3'; Paulo Sousa (red card) 49'; César Brito 76'	Stadium: Estádio dos Barreiros; Referee: Carlos Valente

30 March 1991 29	Benfica	2–0	Vitória de Setúbal	Lisbon
19:00	César Brito 11'; Rui Águas 72' (pen.)	Report		Stadium: Estádio da Luz; Referee: João Simãozinho

3 April 1991 30	Famalicão	1–3	Benfica	Famalicão
20:00	Leomir de Souza (red card) 22'; Milton Cacioli 90' (pen.)	Report	Valdo 10'; César Brito 80'; Pacheco 89' (pen.)	Stadium: Estádio Municipal 22 de Junho; Referee: Veiga Trigo

7 April 1991 31	Benfica	2–0	Braga	Lisbon
19:00	José Carlos 6'; Pacheco 32'	Report		Stadium: Estádio da Luz; Referee: Carlos Calheiros

13 April 1991 32	Desportivo de Chaves	0–3	Benfica	Chaves
19:00		Report	Magnusson 74'; Pacheco 77'; Jonas Thern 87'	Stadium: Estádio Municipal de Chaves; Referee: Fortunato Azevedo

21 April 1991 33	Benfica	5–0	Tirsense	Lisbon
19:45	Paulo Pires 44' (o.g.); Pacheco 70'; César Brito 73'; Rui Águas 77'; Vítor Paneira 85'	Report		Stadium: Estádio da Luz; Referee: Adão Mendes

28 April 1991 34	Porto	0–2	Benfica	Porto
20:30		Report	César Brito 81', 85'	Stadium: Estádio das Antas; Referee: Carlos Valente

5 May 1991 35	Benfica	1–1	Sporting	Lisbon
20:00	Isaías 86'	Report	Litos 80'	Stadium: Estádio da Luz; Referee: Vítor Correia

12 May 1991 36	Benfica	2–0	Farense	Lisbon
20:00	Rui Águas 35'; Pacheco 43'	Report		Stadium: Estádio da Luz; Referee: António Rola

19 May 1991 37	Marítimo	0–2	Benfica	Funchal
19:00		Report	William 39'; Rui Águas 84'	Stadium: Estádio dos Barreiros; Referee: José Pratas

26 May 1991 38	Benfica	3–0	Beira Mar	Lisbon
19:45	Magnusson 70'; Rui Águas 77', 89'	Report		Stadium: Estádio da Luz; Referee: Fortunato Azevedo

=== Taça de Portugal ===
27 February 1991 Fifth Rd	Benfica	4–1	União de Tomar	Lisbon
19:45	Fernando Mendes 21'; Magnusson 28', 30'; Isaías 87'	Report	Moreno 68'	Stadium: Estádio da Luz; Referee: Xavier de Oliveira

13 March 1991 Sixth Rd	Vitória de Setúbal	2–3	Benfica	Setúbal
20:15	Jorge Silva 60'; Mladenov 76' (pen.)	Report	Magnusson 55', 71'; Vítor Paneira 73'	Stadium: Estádio do Bonfim; Referee: Bento Marques

27 March 1991 Round of 16	Benfica	1–0	Marítimo	Lisbon
20:30	Magnusson 47'	Report		Stadium: Estádio da Luz; Referee: José Filipe

17 April 1991 Quarter-final	Porto	2–1	Benfica	Porto
21:00	Domingos 45', 80'	Report	Rui Águas 30'	Stadium: Estádio das Antas; Referee: Rosa Santos

=== UEFA Cup ===
19 September 1990 First leg	Roma (Italy)	1–0	(Portugal) Benfica	Rome
19:45	Carnevale 1'	Report		Stadium: Stadio Olimpico; Attendance: 45,000; Referee: Kurt Röthlisberger

3 October 1990 Second leg	Benfica (Portugal)	0–1	(Italy) Roma	Lisbon
20:30		Report	Giannini 27'; Carboni (red card) 65'	Stadium: Estádio da Luz; Attendance: 50,000; Referee: Aron Schmidhuber

=== Friendlies ===
25 July 1990	Degerfors	1–0	Benfica	Degerfors
	Roger Wermer 4'			Stadium: Stora Valla

28 July 1990	Falkenberg	0–3	Benfica	Falkenberg
			Rui Águas; Paulo Sousa; VataPaulo Sousa	Stadium: Falkenbergs IP

1 August 1990	Borås XI	0–9	Benfica	Borås
			Rui Águas; Valdo Filho; Vata; Vítor Paneira; Jonas Thern; Stefan Schwarz; Erwin Sánchez	Stadium: Ryavallen

4 August 1990	Trönninge	0–10	Benfica	Varberg
			Lima; Vata; Pacheco; César Brito	Stadium: Håstens IP

9 August 1990	Benfica	2–1	Belenenses	Lisbon
	Rui Águas 43'; Vata 90'		Fernando Mendes 85' (o.g.)	Stadium: Estádio da Luz

17 August 1990 Teresa Herrera	Benfica	2–1	Bayern Munich	A Coruña
19:30	Stefan Schwarz; Rui Águas		Alan McInally	Stadium: Estadio Riazor; Referee: Miguel Angel Marin

19 August 1990 Teresa Herrera	Barcelona	2–0	Benfica	A Coruña
19:30	Begiristain 27'; Goikoetxea 68'			Stadium: Estadio Riazor; Referee: Urizar Aziparte

22 August 1990	Roma	1–1	Benfica	Rome
	Piacentini 57'		Pacheco 84'	Stadium: Stadio Olimpico; Referee: Di Legnano

7 September 1990 Taça de Honra	Benfica	1–0	Estrela da Amadora	Lisbon
	Vata 1'			Stadium: Estádio da Luz; Referee: Fernando Correia

9 September 1990 Taça de Honra	Benfica	0–1	Sporting	Lisbon
			Careca 22'	Stadium: Estádio da Luz; Referee: Sepa Santos

10 February 1991	Benfica	8–0	Bern	Lisbon
				Stadium: Estádio da Luz

12 June 1991 Toronto Cup	Benfica	1–1	Milan	Toronto

16 June 1991 Toronto Cup	Benfica	2–1	Canada All-Stars	Vancouver

== Player statistics ==
The squad for the season consisted of the players listed in the tables below, as well as staff member Sven-Goran Eriksson (manager) and Toni (assistant manager).

Note 1: Note: Flags indicate national team as defined under FIFA eligibility rules. Players may hold more than one non-FIFA nationality.

Note 2: Players with squad numbers marked ‡ joined the club during the 1990-91 season via transfer, with more details in the following section.

No.	Pos	Nat	Player	Total		Primeira Divisão		Taça de Portugal		UEFA Cup	
No.	Pos	Nat	Player	Apps	Goals	Apps	Goals	Apps	Goals	Apps	Goals
1	GK	(Portugal) POR	Manuel Bento	0	0	0	0	0	0	0	0
1	GK	(Portugal) POR	Silvino	23	0	17	0	4	0	2	0
1^{‡}	GK	(Portugal) POR	Neno	21	0	21	0	0	0	0	0
2	DF	(Portugal) POR	António Veloso	41	0	36	0	3	0	2	0
2	DF	(Portugal) POR	José Carlos	30	1	26	1	4	0	0	0
2	DF	(Portugal) POR	Fernando Mendes	13	1	10	0	1	1	2	0
3	DF	(Brazil) BRA	Ricardo Gomes	39	9	36	9	2	0	1	0
4^{‡}	DF	(Brazil) BRA	William	43	4	38	4	3	0	2	0
4	MF	(Portugal) POR	Rui Bento	1	0	0	0	1	0	0	0
4	DF	(Portugal) POR	Samuel Quina	12	0	10	0	1	0	1	0
5	DF	(Portugal) POR	Paulo Madeira	12	0	8	0	2	0	2	0
5^{‡}	MF	(Sweden) SWE	Stefan Schwarz	10	4	9	4	0	0	1	0
6	DF	(Portugal) POR	Paulo Sousa	42	0	37	0	3	0	2	0
6	MF	(Portugal) POR	Hernâni Neves	3	0	2	0	1	0	0	0
7	MF	(Portugal) POR	Vítor Paneira	41	10	36	9	3	1	2	0
8	MF	(Sweden) SWE	Jonas Thern	25	4	23	4	1	0	1	0
8^{‡}	MF	(Bolivia) BOL	Erwin Sánchez	17	1	15	1	2	0	0	0
8	MF	(Portugal) POR	António Pacheco	33	8	28	8	4	0	1	0
9^{‡}	FW	(Portugal) POR	Rui Águas	42	26	37	25	3	1	2	0
9	FW	(Angola) ANG	Vata	11	3	11	3	0	0	0	0
9	FW	(Brazil) BRA	Adesvaldo Lima	5	0	4	0	0	0	1	0
10	MF	(Brazil) BRA	Valdo Filho	30	4	26	4	2	0	2	0
11	FW	(Sweden) SWE	Mats Magnusson	17	8	14	3	3	5	0	0
11^{‡}	MF	(Brazil) BRA	Isaías	30	6	24	5	4	1	2	0
11	FW	(Portugal) POR	César Brito	22	7	19	7	3	0	0	0

== Transfers ==
=== In ===
Entry date	Position	Player	From club	Fee	Ref
18 May 1990	MF	Isaías	Boavista	Undisclosed	
30 May 1990	FW	Rui Águas	Porto	Free	
7 June 1990	MF	Stefan Schwarz	Malmö FF	Undisclosed	
8 June 1990	GK	Neno	Vitória de Guimarães	Undisclosed	
9 August 1990	DF	William	Vitória de Guimarães	Undisclosed	
9 August 1990 (Note: Sánchez arrived months earlier for tryouts)	MF	Erwin Sánchez	Bolívar	Undisclosed	

=== Out ===
Exit date	Position	Player	To club	Fee	Ref
30 May 1990	LB	António Fonseca	Vitória de Guimarães	Free	
31 May 1990	MF	Ademir Alcântara	Boavista	Undisclosed	
7 June 1990	LB	Álvaro Magalhães	Estrela da Amadora	Free	
7 June 1990	FW	Abel Campos	Estrela da Amadora	Free	
29 June 1990	CB	Aldair	Roma	5 million	
10 July 1991	MF	Fernando Chalana	Belenenses	Free	
27 July 1990	MF	Diamantino Miranda	Vitória Setúbal	Free	
July 1990	DF	Paulinho	Estoril-Praia	Free	

=== Out by loan ===
Exit date	Position	Player	To club	Return date	Ref
9 July 1990	CB	Pedro Valido	Gil Vicente	30 June 1991	
July 1990	AM	Rui Costa	AD Fafe	30 June 1991	
July 1990	FW	João Pires	Estoril-Praia	30 June 1991	
July 1990	CB	Abel Silva	Penafiel	30 June 1991	
