= 1989 Supertaça Cândido de Oliveira =

- Event: Supertaça Cândido de Oliveira (Portuguese Super Cup)
Benfica	Belenenses
4	0

First leg
Benfica	Belenenses
2	0
- Date: 25 October 1989
- Venue: Estádio da Luz, Lisbon
- Referee: António Marçal (Lisbon)

Second leg
Belenenses	Benfica
0	2
- Date: 29 November 1989
- Venue: Estádio do Restelo, Lisbon
- Referee: Vitor Correia (Lisbon)

The 1989 Supertaça Cândido de Oliveira was the 11th edition of the Supertaça Cândido de Oliveira, the annual Portuguese football season-opening match contested by the winners of the previous season's top league and cup competitions (or cup runner-up in case the league- and cup-winning club is the same). The 1989 Supertaça Cândido de Oliveira was contested over two legs, and opposed Belenenses and Benfica of the Primeira Liga. Benfica qualified for the SuperCup by winning the 1988–89 Primeira Divisão, whilst Belenenses qualified for the Supertaça by winning the 1988–89 Taça de Portugal.

The first leg which took place at the Estádio da Luz, saw Benfica defeat Belenenses 2–0. The second leg which took place at the Estádio do Restelo saw Benfica defeat Belenenses 2–0 (4–0 on aggregate), which claimed the Encarnados a third Supertaça.

== First leg ==
=== Details ===
25 October 1989

Benfica	2–0	Belenenses
Vata 16'; Lima 53'

Estádio da Luz, Lisbon
Referee: António Marçal (Lisbon)

Benfica	Belenenses

GK	1	(Portugal) Silvino
RB		(Portugal) José Carlos
CB		(Portugal) Paulo Madeira
CB		(Portugal) Samuel
LB		(Portugal) António Veloso (c)
RM		(Angola) Abel Campos
CM		(Portugal) Vítor Paneira
LM		(Portugal) António Pacheco	(yellow card) 75'
AM	10	(Brazil) Valdo
CF	9	(Angola) Vata
CF		(Brazil) Lima		(substituted off) 68'
Substitutes:
GK		(Portugal) Manuel Bento
DF		(Portugal) António Fonseca
MF		(Brazil) Ademir Alcântara
MF		(Portugal) Fernando Chalana
MF		(Portugal) Paulo Sousa		(substituted on) 68'
Manager:
(Sweden) Sven-Göran Eriksson

GK	1	(Bulgaria) Borislav Mihaylov
RB	2	(Portugal) Álvaro Teixeira	(yellow card) 77'
CB		(Portugal) Carlos Ribeiro	(yellow card) 55'
CB		(Portugal) João Galo		(substituted off) 45'
CB		(Portugal) Rui Gregório
LB		(Portugal) Carlos Grosso
CM		(Portugal) Juanico (c)
CM		(Brazil) Macaé	(yellow card) 57'	(substituted off) 72'
LW		(Portugal) Adão
RW		(Mozambique) Chiquinho Conde
CF		(Portugal) Chico Faria
Substitutes:
GK		(Portugal) Fernando Justino
DF		(Portugal) Edmundo Silva		(substituted on) 45'
MF		(Portugal) Jaime Mercês
MF		(Portugal) Paulo Monteiro		(substituted on) 72'
FW		(Portugal) Jorge Silva
Manager:
(Bulgaria) Hristo Mladenov

Match officials

- Assistant referees:
- Fourth official:

Match rules

- 90 minutes.
- Maximum of two substitutions

== Second leg ==
=== Details ===
29 November 1989

Belenenses	0–2	Benfica
		Macaé 7' (o.g.); Magnusson 75'

Estádio do Restelo, Lisbon
Referee: Vitor Correia (Lisbon)

Belenenses	Benfica

GK	1	(Bulgaria) Borislav Mihaylov
DF	(Portugal) Álvaro Teixeira
DF	(Portugal) Edmundo Silva
DF	(Portugal) João Galo
DF	3	(Portugal) José António (c)
DF	(Portugal) Carlos Ribeiro	(substituted off) 46'
MF	(Portugal) Juanico
MF	(Brazil) Macaé
MF	(Portugal) Paulo Monteiro	(substituted off) 60'
MF	(Portugal) Adão
FW	(Portugal) Chico Faria
Substitutes:
MF	(Portugal) Jaime Mercês	(substituted on) 60'
FW	(Mozambique) Chiquinho Conde	(substituted on) 46'
Manager:
(Portugal) António Dominguez

GK	1	(Portugal) Silvino
RB		(Portugal) José Carlos
CB		(Brazil) Aldair
CB	3	(Portugal) Samuel
LB		(Portugal) António Veloso (c)
CM		(Sweden) Jonas Thern
CM		(Portugal) Vítor Paneira
AM	7	(Brazil) Valdo
RW		(Angola) Abel Campos	(substituted off) 57'
LW		(Portugal) António Pacheco	(substituted off) 67'
CF	11	(Sweden) Mats Magnusson
Substitutes:
MF		(Portugal) Diamantino	(substituted on) 57'
MF		(Portugal) Fernando Chalana	(substituted on) 67'
Manager:
(Sweden) Sven-Göran Eriksson

Match officials

- Assistant referees:
- Fourth official:

Match rules

- 90 minutes.
- Maximum of two substitutions

1989 Supertaça Cândido de Oliveira Winners
Benfica
3rd Title
