= João Galo =

Portuguese footballer (born 1961)

Personal information
- Full name: João António Silva Duarte Galo
- Date of birth: 23 October 1961 (age 65)
- Place of birth: Almada, Portugal
- Position: Central defender

Youth career
- 1979–1980: Almada

Senior career*
Years	Team	Apps	(Gls)
1980–1984	Almada		
1984–1986	Atlético		
1986–1992	Belenenses	109	(1)

International career
1990	Portugal	1	(0)
- * Club domestic league appearances and goals

João António Silva Duarte Galo (born 23 October 1961) is a former Portuguese footballer who played as central defender.

He had the highlight of his career at Belenenses, where he played from 1986/87 to 1991/92, winning the Cup of Portugal in 1989. Galo gained 1 cap for the Portugal national team in 1990.
