= Mats Magnusson =

Swedish footballer (born 1963)

Personal information
- Full name: Mats Tuve Magnusson
- Date of birth: 10 July 1963 (age 63)
- Place of birth: Helsingborg, Sweden
- Height: 1.85 m (6 ft 1 in)
- Position: Striker

Senior career*
Years	Team	Apps	(Gls)
1981–1985	Malmö FF	38	(20)
1985–1986	Servette	22	(14)
1986–1987	Malmö FF	25	(14)
1987–1992	Benfica	122	(65)
1992–1994	Helsingborg	47	(27)
Total		254	(140)

International career
1979	Sweden U17	4	(3)
1979–1981	Sweden U19	10	(0)
1984–1990	Sweden U21	7	(1)
1984–1990	Sweden	30	(9)
- * Club domestic league appearances and goals

Mats Tuve Magnusson (born 10 July 1963) is a Swedish former professional footballer who played as a striker. Starting off his career with Malmö FF, he is best remembered for his time with Benfica with which he won two league titles, reached two European Cup finals, and was the 1989–90 Primeira Liga top scorer. A full international between 1984 and 1990, he won 30 caps for the Sweden national team and represented his country at the 1990 FIFA World Cup.

== Club career ==
Magnusson was born in Helsingborg. During his career he played for Malmö FF (two spells), Servette FC, S.L. Benfica and Helsingborgs IF. Upon his return home he helped the latter side, featuring a young Henrik Larsson, reach the Allsvenskan.

At the Lisbon club, where he arrived in 1987 as a replacement for fellow Scandinavian, Michael Manniche, Magnusson developed as a top flight goalscorer, winning two Primeira Liga championships and appearing at the European Cup finals in 1988 (lost to PSV Eindhoven in a penalty shoot-out) and 1990 (losing to A.C. Milan). In 1989–90, even though they lost to FC Porto in the league, he finished as top scorer of the competition with 33 goals in 32 games; during his time with Benfica he shared team with countrymen Jonas Thern (1989–92), Stefan Schwarz (1990–94) – also his teammates at Malmö – and coach Sven-Göran Eriksson (1989–92). His total of 87 goals in all official competitions made him Benfica's top foreign goalscorer for more than twenty years. He was later surpassed by Paraguayan international Óscar Cardozo (172 goals) and Brazilian international Jonas (137 goals).

== International career ==
Magnusson earned 30 caps for the Sweden national team, and played in the 1990 FIFA World Cup finals in Italy where he suffered an injury that made him miss nearly one year of football. His debut came on 22 August 1984, as he started in a 1–1 friendly draw to Mexico played in Malmö.

== Career statistics ==
Appearances and goals by national team and year
National team	Year	Apps	Goals
Sweden	1984	1	0
Sweden	1985	4	2
Sweden	1986	4	1
Sweden	1987	6	3
Sweden	1988	1	1
Sweden	1989	9	1
Sweden	1990	5	1
Total		30	9

Scores and results list Sweden's goal tally first, score column indicates score after each Magnusson goal.

#	Date	Venue	Opponent	Score	Result	Competition
1.	11 September 1985	Idrætsparken, Copenhagen, Denmark	Denmark	3–0	3–0	Friendly
2.	25 September 1985	Råsunda, Solna, Sweden	West Germany	2–2	2–2	1986 FIFA World Cup qualification
3.	16 November 1986	Ta' Qali, Attard, Malta	Malta	2–0	5–0	UEFA Euro 1988 qualifying
4.	18 April 1987	Dinamo Stadium, Tbilisi, Soviet Union	Soviet Union	2–0	3–1	Friendly
5.	18 April 1987	Dinamo Stadium, Tbilisi, Soviet Union	Soviet Union	3–1	3–1	Friendly
6.	26 August 1987	Råsunda, Solna, Sweden	Denmark	1–0	1–0	Friendly
7.	1 June 1988	El Helmántico, Villares de la Reina, Spain	Spain	3–1	3–1	Friendly
8.	8 October 1989	Råsunda, Solna, Sweden	Albania	1–1	3–1	Friendly
9.	27 May 1990	Råsunda, Solna, Sweden	Finland	1–0	6–0	Friendly

== Honours ==
Benfica

- Primeira Liga: 1988–89, 1990–91
- Supertaça Cândido de Oliveira: 1989
- Taça de Portugal runner-up: 1988–89
- European Cup runner-up: 1987–88, 1989–90

Malmö

- Allsvenskan: 1985, 1986, 1987
- Svenska Cupen: 1983–84, 1985–86

Individual

- Primeira Liga top scorer: 1989–90
