= Stefan Schwarz =

Swedish footballer

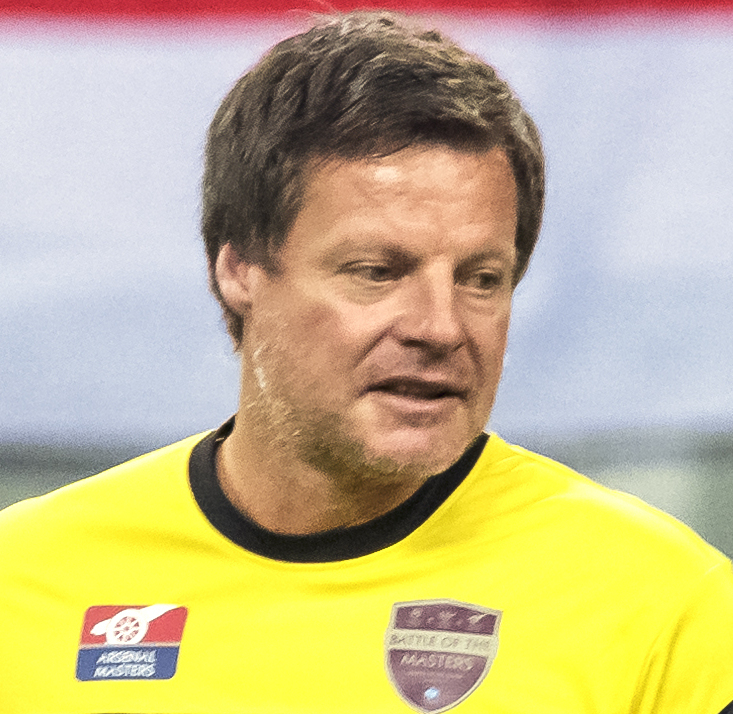
- Schwarz in 2017

Personal information
- Full name: Hans-Jürgen Stefan Schwarz
- Date of birth: 18 April 1969 (age 57)
- Place of birth: Malmö, Sweden
- Height: 1.79 m (5 ft 10 in)
- Positions: Midfielder; left wing back

Youth career
- –1982: Kulladals FF
- 1982–1985: Malmö FF
- 1985–1987: Bayer Leverkusen

Senior career*
Years	Team	Apps	(Gls)
1987–1990	Malmö FF	32	(0)
1990–1994	Benfica	77	(7)
1994–1995	Arsenal	34	(2)
1995–1998	Fiorentina	78	(2)
1998–1999	Valencia	23	(4)
1999–2003	Sunderland	62	(3)
Total		306	(18)

International career
1984–1985	Sweden U17	10	(0)
1986	Sweden U19	1	(0)
1987–1988	Sweden U21	6	(0)
1990–2001	Sweden	69	(6)
Medal record
FIFA World Cup
Third place	1994 USA
- * Club domestic league appearances and goals

Hans-Jürgen Stefan Schwarz (German pronunciation: [ˈʃteːfan ˈʃvaʁts]; Swedish pronunciation: [ˈsteːfan ˈɧʋaʈs]; born 18 April 1969) is a Swedish former professional footballer who played as a midfielder. Schwarz started off his career with Malmö FF in 1987 before moving on to represent Benfica, Arsenal, Fiorentina and Valencia until he retired at Sunderland in 2003. Schwarz won 69 caps for the Sweden national team, scoring six goals. He represented his country at the 1990 FIFA World Cup, UEFA Euro 1992 and most notably the 1994 FIFA World Cup where Sweden finished third.

== Club career ==
Born to a German father (who played football in lower leagues in Germany) and a Swedish mother in the city of Malmö, Schwarz started his playing career as a midfielder with Kulladals FF's academy. Between 1985 and 1987, he spent two seasons with Bayer Leverkusen's youth team. He made his debut as a professional footballer with his hometown club Malmö FF. He then moved to Benfica for the 1990–91 season to play under manager Sven-Göran Eriksson. Schwarz became a regular starter for Benfica, winning the Primeira Liga twice, and playing in the side that knocked Arsenal out of the European Cup in 1991.

He subsequently moved to London to play for Arsenal in the summer of 1994 for £1.8 million but grew frustrated with George Graham's defensive tactics. The defeat to Real Zaragoza in the 1995 UEFA Cup Winners' Cup final was Schwarz's last game for Arsenal. He left Highbury after just one season at the club.

Schwarz then completed a £2.5 million transfer to Fiorentina. He spent three seasons in Italy, lifting the Coppa Italia and Super Cup. In the summer 1998 he reunited with Claudio Ranieri, moving to Spain to join Valencia. After one season he joined English side Sunderland on 29 July 1999 for a then-club record fee of £3.75 million. Because of Schwarz's publicly-expressed desire to become a space tourist, the club inserted a "Space Clause" into his contract, stating that if he were to travel beyond Earth's atmosphere his contract would become wholly invalid.

He was bestowed with the Guldbollen in November 1999, Sweden's award for footballer of the year. Schwarz eventually fell out with manager Peter Reid and was transfer listed in summer 2002. He made his last appearance for the club coming off the bench for the final 25 minutes of the League Cup tie at Sheffield United 3 December 2002. Schwarz retired from playing in March 2003.

== International career ==
After having represented the Sweden U17, U19, and U21 teams, Schwarz made his full international debut for Sweden on 14 February 1990 as a substitute in a friendly game against the United Arab Emirates where he replaced Pontus Kåmark in the 80th minute before also scoring his first international goal in a 1–1 draw. A few months later he appeared in his first major tournament for Sweden as he played in all three games at left back as Sweden was eliminated from the 1990 FIFA World Cup after the group stage.

In 1992, Schwarz appeared in three games as Sweden progressed to the semi-finals of UEFA Euro 1992 before being eliminated by West Germany. In 1994, he played in centre midfield alongside Jonas Thern as Sweden finished third at the 1994 FIFA World Cup. An injury to his Achilles tendon kept him out of the squad for UEFA Euro 2000.

He declared his international retirement in August 2001 to focus on his club team after a series of injuries while with the national team. His last international appearance came in a 2002 FIFA World Cup qualifier against Moldova on 28 March 2001.

Schwarz won a total of 69 caps during his career, scoring six goals.

== Career statistics ==
Appearances and goals by national team and year
National team	Year	Apps	Goals
Sweden	1990	11	2
Sweden	1991	0	0
Sweden	1992	7	2
Sweden	1993	7	0
Sweden	1994	12	1
Sweden	1995	7	1
Sweden	1996	5	0
Sweden	1997	2	0
Sweden	1998	7	0
Sweden	1999	6	0
Sweden	2000	2	0
Sweden	2001	3	0
Total		69	6

Scores and results list Sweden's goal tally first, score column indicates score after each Schwarz goal.

List of international goals scored by Stefan Schwarz
No.	Date	Venue	Opponent	Score	Result	Competition	Ref.
1	14 February 1990	Al-Maktoum Stadium, Dubai, United Arab Emirates	United Arab Emirates	2–1	2–1	Friendly	
2	11 April 1990	Stade du 5 Juillet 1962, Algiers, Algeria	Algeria	1–1	1–1	Friendly	
3	27 May 1992	Råsunda Stadium, Solna, Sweden	Hungary	1–0	2–1	Friendly	
4	27 May 1992	Råsunda Stadium, Solna, Sweden	Hungary	2–0	2–1	Friendly	
5	5 May 1994	Råsunda Stadium, Solna, Sweden	Nigeria	1–0	3–1	Friendly	
6	11 October 1995	Råsunda Stadium, Solna, Sweden	Scotland	2–0	2–0	Friendly	

== Honours ==
Malmö

- Swedish Championship: 1988
- Allsvenskan: 1987, 1988
- Svenska Cupen: 1989

Benfica

- Primeira Divisão: 1990–91, 1993–94
- Taça de Portugal: 1992–93

Arsenal

- UEFA Cup Winners' Cup: Runner-up 1994–95

Fiorentina

- Coppa Italia: 1995–96
- Supercoppa Italiana: 1996

Valencia

- UEFA Intertoto Cup: 1998
- Copa del Rey: 1998–99

Sweden

- FIFA World Cup third place: 1994

Individual

- "Man of the tournament" – Makita Tournament: 1994
- Guldbollen: 1999
