= Jaime Mercês =

Portuguese footballer (born 1963)

Jaime
Personal information
- Full name: Jaime Jerónimo das Mercês
- Date of birth: 27 September 1963 (age 63)
- Place of birth: Cova da Piedade, Portugal
- Position: Midfielder

Youth career
- 1978–1980: Atlético
- 1980–1981: Amora

Senior career*
Years	Team	Apps	(Gls)
1981–1983	Amora	48	(2)
1983–1992	Belenenses	211	(21)
1992–1993	Vitória Setúbal	28	(4)
1993–1994	Ovarense	20	(1)
1994–1995	Amora	27	(1)
1995–1996	Desportivo Beja	33	(2)
1996–1998	Atlético	49	(3)
2000–2001	Amora		
Total		416	(34)

International career
1985–1987	Portugal	9	(0)
- * Club domestic league appearances and goals

Jaime Jerónimo das Mercês (born 27 September 1963), known simply as Jaime, is a Portuguese former professional footballer who played as a midfielder.

== Club career ==
Jaime was born in Cova da Piedade, Almada. After starting out professionally at lowly Amora FC, then in the Primeira Liga, he signed at the age of 20 with Lisbon-based C.F. Os Belenenses, helping it promote from the Segunda Liga in his first season and remaining a nuclear first-team member the following years, making more than 250 competitive appearances. He helped to a Taça de Portugal 2–1 final win against neighbours S.L. Benfica in 1989 and, earlier that campaign, participated in the elimination of UEFA Cup holders Bayer 04 Leverkusen (2–0 on aggregate).

In 1992, Jaime joined Vitória de Setúbal of the second division, helping them return to the top flight. Subsequently, entering his 30s, he resumed his career in the second and third tiers, finishing his career at his first club Amora aged 37.

== International career ==
Jaime earned nine caps for Portugal, eight of those coming after the 1986 FIFA World Cup as practically the entire squad had defected the national team following the Saltillo Affair. His debut came on 12 October 1985, in a 3–2 home victory over Malta during the qualifying stages for that tournament.
