= Abel Campos =

Angolan footballer (born 1962)

Personal information
- Full name: Afonso Abel de Campos
- Date of birth: 4 May 1962 (age 64)
- Place of birth: Luanda, Angola
- Height: 1.75 m (5 ft 9 in)
- Position: Winger

Senior career*
Years	Team	Apps	(Gls)
1982–1988	Petro Atlético		
1988–1990	Benfica	49	(8)
1990–1991	Estrela Amadora	30	(3)
1991–1992	Braga	15	(3)
1992–1994	Benfica Castelo Branco	12	(1)
1994–1995	Gelora Dewata	25	(5)
1995–1997	Alverca	19	(1)
1997–1998	PSIS Semarang	20	(4)
Total		170	(25)

International career
1988−1996	Angola	16	(1)
- * Club domestic league appearances and goals

Afonso Abel de Campos (born 4 May 1962) is an Angolan retired footballer who played as a right winger.

== Club career ==
Born in Luanda, Campos started his career with local Atlético Petróleos de Luanda, where he won five Girabola championships in only six years. Subsequently, he caught the eye of Portuguese Primeira Liga side S.L. Benfica, who signed him for the 1988–89 season.

31 of Campos' league appearances with them came in that first year – 19 starts – and he added three goals to help his team to the domestic title. He continued competing in the country in the following three years, with C.F. Estrela da Amadora S.C. Braga and Sport Benfica e Castelo Branco, the latter club in the Segunda Liga.

Until his retirement, in 1998 at the age of 36, Campos alternated between Portugal and Indonesia. In the latter nation, he shared teams at Gelora Dewata with former Benfica teammate Vata.

== International career ==
Campos represented Angola during eight years, making his debut in 1988. He appeared in six 1990 FIFA World Cup qualifying matches, and was part of the squad at the 1996 African Cup of Nations.

== Personal life ==
Campos' son, Djalma, was also a footballer. He too spent most of his career in Portugal.

== Honours ==
=== Club ===
Petro Atlético

- Girabola: 1982, 1984, 1986, 1987, 1988
- Taça de Angola: 1987

Benfica

- Primeira Liga: 1988–89
- Supertaça Cândido de Oliveira: 1989
- European Cup: Runner-up 1989–90
