= António Pacheco (footballer, born 1966) =

Portuguese footballer (1966–2024)

Personal information
- Full name: António Manuel Pacheco Domingos
- Date of birth: 1 December 1966
- Place of birth: Portimão, Portugal
- Date of death: 20 March 2024 (aged 57)
- Place of death: Faro, Portugal
- Height: 1.74 m (5 ft 9 in)
- Position: Winger

Youth career
- 1979–1980: Torralta
- 1980–1981: Portimonense
- 1981–1985: Torralta

Senior career*
Years	Team	Apps	(Gls)
1985–1986	Torralta	31	(8)
1986–1987	Portimonense	23	(0)
1987–1993	Benfica	162	(30)
1993–1995	Sporting CP	22	(2)
1995–1996	Belenenses	6	(0)
1996–1998	Reggiana	14	(1)
1998	Santa Clara	8	(0)
1999	Atlético	16	(5)
1999–2000	Estoril	27	(4)
2000–2001	Atlético	8	(0)
Total		317	(50)

International career
1985	Portugal U18	3	(0)
1986–1987	Portugal U21	9	(4)
1989–1991	Portugal	6	(0)

Managerial career
- 2001: Atlético
- 2004–2005: Portimonense
- * Club domestic league appearances and goals

António Manuel Pacheco Domingos (1 December 1966 – 20 March 2024), known as Pacheco, was a Portuguese professional footballer who played as a winger.

== Club career ==
Born in Portimão, Algarve, Pacheco started playing with local sides Torralta and Portimonense, making his debut in the Primeira Liga with the latter in the 1986–87 season. Subsequently, aged just 20, he signed for Benfica, going on to remain with the club for the next six years and help in the conquest of four major titles.

Pacheco contributed five goals in 26 matches in the 1988–89 campaign, as the Lisbon team won the national championship. He was also in the starting XI when they lost two European Cup finals in three years, in 1988 and 1990.

Pacheco joined neighbouring Sporting CP in summer 1993, alongside teammate Paulo Sousa. From there onwards, however, he received little continuity due to injuries as well as a run-in with Sporting manager Carlos Queiroz, and totalled only 50 league appearances in five years, also representing Belenenses, Reggiana of the Italian Serie A and Santa Clara; he retired in 2001 at the age of 34, after three seasons in the lower leagues.

In 1996, Pacheco went on trial with Premier League club Sunderland, but was not offered a permanent contract. He amassed Portuguese top-division totals of 213 games and 32 goals over one decade, and later worked as a manager at Atlético Clube de Portugal (third tier) and Portimonense (Segunda Liga).

== International career ==
Pacheco earned six caps for Portugal in two years, all as a Benfica player. His first appearance was on 15 February 1989, as he came on as a 60th-minute substitute in a 1–1 home draw against Belgium for the 1990 FIFA World Cup qualifiers; in the process, he became the first footballer born in Portimão to represent the national team.

== Style of play ==
Pacheco distinguished himself for the quality of his wide dribbling, fast progression on the field and accurate left-footed crosses. The Portuguese Football Federation remembered him as a virtuoso of football.

== Personal life and death ==
After retiring, Pacheco ran a bar in Lagos. He died in Faro on 20 March 2024, aged 57. He was firstly taken to Portimão hospital but later was transported to Faro by helicopter as he needed cardiology care and this was not available in the former city. He had fallen ill the previous week during a bowling game he attended with friends in Praia da Rocha, he lost consciousness after suffering a cardiac arrest; despite recovery efforts, he never regained consciousness and was declared brain dead the following day.

== Honours ==
Benfica

- Primeira Liga: 1988–89, 1990–91
- Taça de Portugal: 1992–93
- Supertaça Cândido de Oliveira: 1989
- European Cup runner-up: 1987–88, 1989–90

Sporting CP

- Taça de Portugal: 1994–95
