= José Garrido (footballer) =

Portuguese football manager and player (1960–2024)

Personal information
- Full name: José António Rocha Garrido
- Date of birth: 11 July 1960
- Place of birth: Luanda, Portuguese Angola
- Date of death: 9 November 2024 (aged 64)
- Height: 1.87 m (6 ft 2 in)
- Position: Centre-back

Youth career
- 1975: ASA
- 1975–1976: Amadores Caminha
- 1976–1977: Braga
- 1977–1978: Monção

Senior career*
Years	Team	Apps	(Gls)
1978–1982	Monção		
1982–1986	Gil Vicente		
1986–1988	Chaves	52	(2)
1988–1989	Benfica	12	(1)
1989–1993	Boavista	74	(3)
1993–1994	Famalicão	21	(1)
1994–1996	Aves	51	(0)

International career
	Portugal U23	1	(0)

Managerial career
- 1997: Tirsense
- 1998: Aves
- 2001: Freamunde
- 2001–2003: Lousada
- 2003: Penafiel
- 2003–2004: Vizela
- 2004–2005: Sabah
- 2005: Sabah
- 2006–2007: Kazma
- 2007–2008: Qadsia
- 2008–2010: Al-Riffa
- 2011: Penafiel
- 2012: Dhofar Club
- 2012–2014: Al-Nasr
- 2014–2015: Al-Riffa
- 2016: Gabon
- 2019–2021: Al-Batin
- 2021: Al-Jabalain
- 2023: Al-Qaisumah
- * Club domestic league appearances and goals

José António Rocha Garrido (11 July 1960 – 9 November 2024) was a Portuguese football player and manager who played as a centre-back.

== Managerial career ==
Garrido's early managerial career was spent in the lower leagues of Portuguese football. In May 2003, he took over at F.C. Penafiel, three points above relegation from Segunda Liga, for the final four games before beginning a contract at third-tier F.C. Vizela. Following a year there, he moved abroad to Sabah FA of Malaysia in November 2004, and Kuwaiti duo Kazma SC and Qadsia SC. In 2010, he won the Bahraini King's Cup for Riffa SC, ending a 12-year drought in that competition.

In January 2011, Garrido was back in his own country for the first time in seven years to take the helm again at Penafiel. On 6 March he was dismissed and replaced by Jorge Regadas.

Garrido went back to the Middle East, managing Dhofar Club (Oman), Al-Nasr SC (Kuwait) and a second spell at Riffa. He was appointed manager of the Gabon national football team in November 2016, after the dismissal of compatriot Jorge Costa. In the same month, he too was dismissed and replaced by José Antonio Camacho; he sued the Gabonese Football Federation for wrongful dismissal at the Court of Arbitration for Sport and received $514,000 compensation.

On 24 September 2019, Garrido was appointed the manager of Saudi Arabian club Al-Batin. In his first season in charge he managed to win the MS League title and promotion to the Pro League.

On 28 June 2021, Garrido was appointed the manager of Al-Jabalain.

On 26 January 2023, Garrido was appointed the manager of Al-Qaisumah.

== Death ==
Garrido died on 9 November 2024, at the age of 64.

== Honours ==
=== Manager ===
Al-Batin

- MS League: 2019–20
