= Jonas Thern =

Swedish footballer and manager

Personal information
- Full name: Jonas Magnus Thern
- Date of birth: 20 March 1967 (age 59)
- Place of birth: Falköping, Sweden
- Height: 1.78 m (5 ft 10 in)
- Position: Midfielder

Youth career
- 1982–1985: IFK Värnamo

Senior career*
Years	Team	Apps	(Gls)
1985–1987	Malmö FF	41	(6)
1987	FC Zürich	5	(0)
1988–1989	Malmö FF	35	(5)
1989–1992	Benfica	100	(10)
1992–1994	Napoli	48	(1)
1994–1997	Roma	59	(3)
1997–1999	Rangers	23	(5)
Total		308	(31)

International career
1984–1985	Sweden U19	10	(2)
1986–1988	Sweden U21/O	15	(3)
1987–1997	Sweden	75	(6)

Managerial career
- 2000–2001: IFK Värnamo
- 2002–2003: Halmstads BK
- 2010: IFK Värnamo
- 2017: Landskrona BoIS (assistant)
- 2019–2024: IFK Värnamo
Medal record
Sweden
FIFA World Cup
Bronze medal – third place	1994
- * Club domestic league appearances and goals

Jonas Magnus Thern (born 20 March 1967) is a Swedish football manager who manages Allsvenskan club IFK Värnamo.

As a player, Thern was a midfielder. Starting his career with Malmö FF in 1985, he went on to represent FC Zürich, Benfica, Napoli, Roma and Rangers before retiring in 1999.

A full international between 1987 and 1997, Thern won 75 caps for Sweden and captained the side that finished third at the 1994 FIFA World Cup. He also represented his country at the UEFA Euro 1992 on home soil, as well as the 1988 Summer Olympics and 1990 FIFA World Cup.

== Club career ==
Born in Falköping and raised in Värnamo, Thern started his professional career in 1985 at Malmö FF, where he stayed for four years and won two Allsvenskan titles in 1986 and 1988.

In 1989, Thern received the Guldbollen as Sweden's Footballer of the Year. That same year, he left for Benfica as part of a successful group of Scandinavian players that played there at the same time, such as Danish international Michael Manniche (1983–1987) and the Swedish "armada" of Mats Magnusson (1987–1992), Thern (1989–1992), Glenn Strömberg (1982–84) and Stefan Schwarz (1990–94). Benfica were also coached by a Swede, Sven-Göran Eriksson (1982–1984 and 1989–1992).

Thern then played in Italy for Napoli and Roma. In 1997, he joined Rangers in Scotland, a move that lasted merely two years but nonetheless accompanied by silverware, a league title in 1999 – his final year in professional football – as frequent injuries forced him to retire early.

== International career ==
For Sweden, he played in the 1990 FIFA World Cup and Euro 1992, and then won the bronze medal in the 1994 FIFA World Cup in the United States. Thern also competed for Sweden at the 1988 Summer Olympics. Thern was the Sweden captain for seven years, between 1990 and 1997.

== Coaching career ==
After he retired as a player he became head coach for IFK Värnamo between 2000 and 2001 and Halmstads BK 2001–2003.

In 2021, he led IFK Värnamo to promotion to Allsvenskan for the first time ever in the club's history.

== Personal life ==
Jonas has a son, Simon, who is also a footballer. His daughter, Alicia, is an equestrian.

== Career statistics ==
=== International ===
Appearances and goals by national team and year

National team	Season	Apps	Goals
Sweden
Sweden	1987	2	0
Sweden	1988	10	3
Sweden	1989	8	1
Sweden	1990	4	1
Sweden	1991	6	1
Sweden	1992	9	0
Sweden	1993	4	0
Sweden	1994	11	0
Sweden	1995	6	0
Sweden	1996	8	0
Sweden	1997	7	0
Total		75	6

International goals

Scores and results list Sweden's goal tally first.

#	Date	Venue	Opponent	Score	Result	Competition
1.	12 January 1988	Estadio Municipal de Maspalomas, Maspalomas, Spain	East Germany	2–1	4–1	Friendly
2.	12 January 1988	Estadio Municipal de Maspalomas, Maspalomas, Spain	East Germany	4–1	4–1	Friendly
3.	15 January 1988	Estadio Municipal de Maspalomas, Maspalomas, Spain	Finland	1–0	1–0	Friendly
4.	16 August 1989	Malmö Stadion, Malmö, Sweden	France	1–0	2–4	Friendly
5.	27 May 1990	Råsunda Stadium, Solna, Sweden	Finland	6–0	6–0	Friendly
6.	4 September 1991	Råsunda Stadium, Solna, Sweden	Yugoslavia	4–2	4–3	Friendly

== Honours ==
=== Club ===
Malmö

- Swedish Champion: 1986, 1988
- Allsvenskan: 1985, 1986, 1987, 1988, 1989
- Svenska Cupen: 1985–86, 1987–88

Benfica

- Primeira Divisão: 1990–91
- Supertaça Cândido de Oliveira: 1989
- European Cup runner-up: 1989–90

Rangers

- Scottish Premier League: 1998–99

=== International ===
- FIFA World Cup third place: 1994

=== Individual ===
- Guldbollen: 1989
