= Ademir Alcântara =

Brazilian footballer (born 1962)

Personal information
- Full name: Ademir Bernardes Alcântara
- Date of birth: 17 December 1962 (age 63)
- Place of birth: Mandaguaçu, Paraná, Brazil
- Height: 1.86 m (6 ft 1 in)
- Position: Attacking midfielder

Youth career
- 1979: Cianorte

Senior career*
Years	Team	Apps	(Gls)
1979–1984	Pinheiros		
1984	Pelotas	53	(21)
1985–1986	Internacional	27	(8)
1986–1988	Vitória Guimarães	64	(20)
1988–1990	Benfica	30	(4)
1990–1991	Boavista	17	(7)
1991–1994	Marítimo	85	(16)
1994	Mogi Mirim		
1995–1996	Coritiba		
Total		276	(76)
- * Club domestic league appearances and goals

Ademir Bernardes Alcântara (born 17 December 1962) is a Brazilian retired footballer who played as attacking midfielder.

== Career ==
Born in Mandaguaçu, Paraná, Alcântara started in Brazil lower leagues. After being top-scorer of the 1984 Campeonato Gaúcho, he joined Internacional, staying two seasons before moving to Portugal, joining Vitória Guimarães.

In Guimarães, in his first year, he partnered with Paulinho Cascavel to help Minho side overachieved for a final third place, and qualified for the UEFA Cup. His second year was even better, scoring 15 league goals as Guimarães nearly avoid relegation. Subsequently, he caught the eye of Portuguese powerhouses S.L. Benfica and F.C. Porto. In what some consider, the beginning of the hatred rivalry between the two. Alcântara chose Benfica and Porto exacted revenge by signing Dito and Rui Àguas. He won the title in the first year first year, but lost his place to Valdo, after he was deemed too slow.

After two seasons, he moved elsewhere, first in Boavista and then in Marítimo, where he was influential in helping the team qualify for the 1993–94 UEFA Cup.
