= António Aparício (footballer, born 1958) =

Portuguese footballer

Personal information
- Full name: António Aires dos Santos Aparício
- Date of birth: 15 September 1958 (age 68)
- Place of birth: Paul, Portugal
- Height: 1.84 m (6 ft 0 in)
- Position: Striker

Youth career
- 1971–1972: Covilhã

Senior career*
Years	Team	Apps	(Gls)
1977–1978	Faucingny		
1979	Sochaux B	7	(0)
1980	Faucingny		
1980–1981	Lyon B		
1981–1984	Villefranche	91	(51)
1984–1990	Vitória Setúbal	142	(48)
1990–1991	Braga	10	(2)
1991–1992	Nacional	28	(7)
1992–1993	Montijo	22	(5)
1993–1994	Leixões	7	(1)
1996–1997	Grandolense		
Total		307+	(114+)

International career
1987	Portugal U21	3	(1)
1987–1988	Portugal U23	3	(1)
1987	Portugal	1	(0)
- * Club domestic league appearances and goals

António Aires dos Santos Aparício (born 15 September 1958 in Paul, Covilhã) is a Portuguese former professional footballer who played as a striker.
