= Ricardo Gomes =

Brazilian footballer (born 1964)

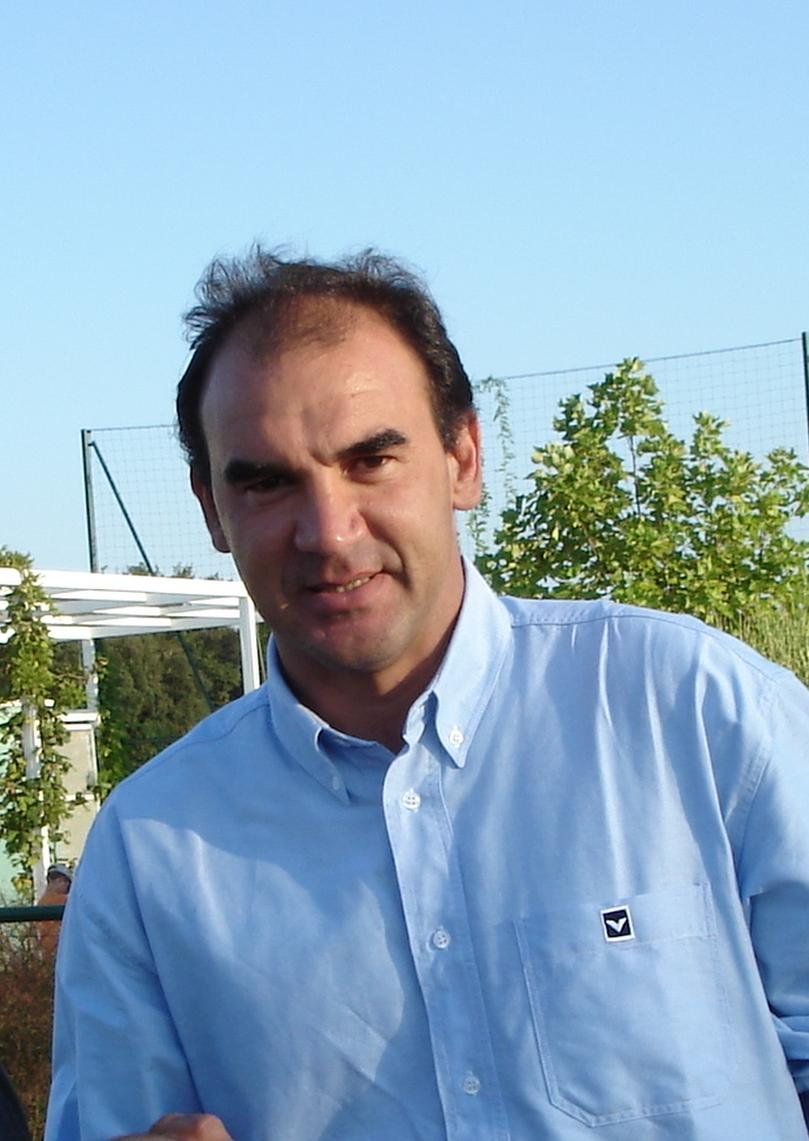
- Gomes in 2005

Personal information
- Full name: Ricardo Gomes Raymundo
- Date of birth: 13 December 1964 (age 61)
- Place of birth: Rio de Janeiro, Brazil
- Height: 1.89 m (6 ft 2 in)
- Position: Centre back

Senior career*
Years	Team	Apps	(Gls)
1982–1988	Fluminense	201	(11)
1988–1991	Benfica	83	(19)
1991–1995	Paris Saint-Germain	115	(11)
1995–1996	Benfica	17	(4)
Total		416	(45)

International career
1984–1994	Brazil	45	(4)

Managerial career
- 1996–1998: Paris Saint-Germain
- 1999: Sport Recife
- 1999–2000: Vitória
- 2001: Guarani
- 2001: Coritiba
- 2002: Juventude
- 2002–2004: Brazil Olympic
- 2004: Fluminense
- 2004: Flamengo
- 2005–2007: Bordeaux
- 2007–2009: Monaco
- 2009–2010: São Paulo
- 2011: Vasco da Gama
- 2015–2016: Botafogo
- 2016: São Paulo
- 2017: Al-Nassr
- 2018–2019: Bordeaux
Medal record
Men's football
Representing Brazil
Olympic Games
Silver medal – second place	1988 Seoul	Team competition
Pan American Games
Gold medal – first place	1987 Indianapolis	Team competition
- * Club domestic league appearances and goals

Ricardo Gomes Raymundo (born 13 December 1964) is a Brazilian retired professional footballer and manager. As a player, he played as a central defender, in a 14-year professional career, for Fluminense (six years), Benfica (four) and Paris Saint-Germain (four). Gomes played for Brazil during the 1980s and 1990s, representing the nation at the 1990 World Cup and in two Copa América tournaments.

Subsequently, he went on to have a lengthy managerial career, in both his country and France.

== Club career ==
Born in Rio de Janeiro, Gomes started playing professionally with Fluminense. With the club, he won three consecutive state leagues, adding the 1984 Série A.

In the middle of 1988, he signed with Benfica of Portugal, alongside compatriot Valdo, a midfielder. Both were important elements in their debut season, as Benfica won the national championship, a feat which was again accomplished in 1991, with the defender scoring an astonishing 17 goals in both conquests combined, due to his superb aerial ability.

Both Gomes and Valdo left for Paris Saint-Germain in the middle of 1991, and both would return four years later to Lisbon, having won a total of four titles, including the 1993–94 first division title. In his second Benfica spell, he played sparingly, but still managed to score four times in the league, and helped the team win the Taça de Portugal, before retiring from football in June 1996, at only 31.

== International career ==
During one decade, Gomes won 45 caps for Brazil. He appeared for the nation at two Copa América tournaments, winning the 1989 edition played on home soil, and was present at the 1990 FIFA World Cup, where he played all the matches and minutes until being sent off in the 85th minute for a foul on José Basualdo, in the round of 16 0–1 loss against Argentina.

Gomes was also selected – again as captain – to the 1994 World Cup, but had to be removed from the squad in the last hour, due to injury. Additionally, he was part of the team that won the silver medal at the 1988 Summer Olympics.

== Coaching career ==
Gomes immediately started coaching with Paris Saint-Germain, leaving the French side after two years, having finished second in the 1996–97 season and winning the following season's Coupe de France. He then returned to his country, managing seven teams until 2004, also having a spell with the Brazilian Olympic team.

In the following four seasons, Gomes worked again in France, with Bordeaux then going on to manage Monégasque side Monaco, leaving his post at the latter in late May 2009, with the team eventually ranking 11th.

On 20 June 2009, Gomes signed with São Paulo, replacing Muricy Ramalho. In early February 2011, he moved to Vasco da Gama, leading his hometown club to its first ever Copa do Brasil, a 3–3 aggregate win against Coritiba.

On 28 August 2011, 46-year-old Gomes suffered a stroke during the match between Flamengo and Vasco da Gama. He was taken to hospital in an ambulance with the game still playing, and was diagnosed with a life-threatening brain hemorrhage that required emergency head surgery.

On 14 November 2012, after more one year away from football, Gomes came back to Vasco da Gama as technical director. On 22 July 2015, he returned to command Botafogo in the Campeonato Brasileiro Série B.

In August 2016, Gomes was appointed as the head coach of São Paulo. However, on 23 November 2016, he was dismissed following poor form which left São Paulo one point away from the relegation zone.

On 5 September 2018, after two months as Santos director of football, Gomes was announced as the head coach of Bordeaux, returning to the post after several weeks following the sacking of previous manager Gus Poyet.

== Managerial statistics ==
As of 7 March 2025

Team	From	To	Record				
Team	From	To	P	W	D	L	Win %
Paris Saint-Germain	1996	1998	106	54	24	28	50.94
Brazil Olympic	2003	2004	19	11	4	4	57.89
Flamengo	2004	2004	15	4	6	5	26.67
Bordeaux	2005	2007	97	45	28	24	46.39
Monaco	2007	2009	85	29	20	36	34.12
São Paulo	2009	2010	73	38	15	20	52.05
Vasco da Gama	2011	2011	45	24	14	7	53.33
Botafogo	2015	2016	67	34	17	16	50.75
São Paulo	2016	2016	18	6	5	7	33.33
Al-Nassr	2017	2017	5	2	3	0	40.00
Bordeaux	2018	2019	32	11	9	12	34.38
Total			554	258	145	159	46.57

== Honours ==
=== Player ===
Fluminense

- Campeonato Brasileiro Série A: 1984
- Campeonato Carioca: 1983, 1984, 1985

Benfica

- Primeira Liga: 1989–89, 1990–91
- Taça de Portugal: 1995–96

Paris Saint-Germain

- Ligue 1: 1993–94
- Coupe de France: 1992–93, 1994–95
- Coupe de la Ligue: 1994–95

Brazil

- Pan American Games: 1987
- Olympic Silver Medal: 1988
- Copa América: 1989

=== Manager ===
Paris Saint-Germain

- Coupe de France: 1997–98
- Coupe de la Ligue: 1997–98

Vitória

- Copa do Nordeste: 1999
- Campeonato Baiano: 1999

Bordeaux

- Coupe de la Ligue: 2006–07

Vasco da Gama

- Copa do Brasil: 2011

Botafogo

- Campeonato Brasileiro Série B: 2015
