= Juanico =

Portuguese footballer

Personal information
- Full name: José Alberto Peixoto da Silva
- Date of birth: 5 December 1958 (age 67)
- Place of birth: Guimarães, Portugal
- Height: 1.77 m (5 ft 10 in)
- Position: Midfielder

Youth career
- Vitória Guimarães

Senior career*
Years	Team	Apps	(Gls)
1978–1980	Caçadores Taipas		
1980–1983	Vizela		
1983–1984	Varzim	18	(0)
1984–1987	Rio Ave	99	(5)
1987–1991	Belenenses	125	(9)
1991–1992	Penafiel	33	(2)
1992–1993	Moreirense	25	(1)
1993–1994	Caçadores Taipas		
1994–1996	Sandinenses	26	(1)
1996–1997	Caçadores Taipas		

International career
1987	Portugal U23	3	(0)
1989	Portugal	1	(0)
- * Club domestic league appearances and goals

José Alberto Peixoto da Silva (born 5 December 1958 in Guimarães), known as Juanico, is a Portuguese retired footballer who played as a central midfielder. He played for Belenenses from 1987/88 to 1990/91, where he won the Cup of Portugal in 1989, in a game where he scored the winning goal over Benfica (2-1).
