= José Carlos (footballer, born 1966) =

Portuguese footballer and commentator

Personal information
- Full name: José Carlos Martins Ferreira
- Date of birth: 2 August 1966 (age 60)
- Place of birth: Lisbon, Portugal
- Height: 1.73 m (5 ft 8 in)
- Position: Right-back

Youth career
- 1978–1983: Domingos Sávio
- 1983–1985: Benfica

Senior career*
Years	Team	Apps	(Gls)
1985–1993	Benfica	99	(3)
1987–1989	→ Portimonense (loan)	72	(2)
1993–1994	Estrela Amadora	33	(0)
1994–1999	Vitória Guimarães	138	(7)
1999–2000	Belenenses	22	(3)
2000–2002	Atlético CP	67	(11)
Total		431	(26)

International career
1984–1985	Portugal U18	5	(0)
1987	Portugal U21	4	(0)
1990	Portugal	1	(0)
- * Club domestic league appearances and goals

José Carlos Martins Ferreira (born 2 August 1966), known as José Carlos, is a Portuguese former professional footballer who played as a right-back.

He started his career with Benfica, where he won four major titles, representing four more teams in the Primeira Liga and amassing totals of 364 matches and 15 goals over 15 seasons.

== Club career ==
Born in Lisbon, José Carlos started at local Desportivo Domingos Sávio at age 12, finishing his development at neighbouring S.L. Benfica. In his first two seasons as a professional he failed to make a Primeira Liga appearance, as manager John Mortimore favoured António Veloso for the position. He made his debut in a Taça de Portugal match against SL Cartaxo on 18 January 1987, as the season ended with a double.

José Carlos was loaned to Portimonense S.C. in summer 1987, being an undisputed starter during his tenure in Algarve and subsequently returning to Benfica. He played 135 games and scored three goals in all competitions over the following four seasons, winning the 1990–91 national championship, another domestic cup and the 1989 edition of the Supertaça Cândido de Oliveira. He also took part in the final of the 1989–90 European Cup, lost to AC Milan.

In 1993, facing competition from Abel Silva and Abel Xavier, José Carlos moved to C.F. Estrela da Amadora, where he reunited with former teammates Edmundo, António Fonseca, Fernando Mendes and Paulinho. He helped his next club, Vitória de Guimarães, to two fourth-place finishes and one third, the latter in the 1997–98 campaign.

José Carlos retired in 2003 at the age of 36, after one year in the top flight with C.F. Os Belenenses and three in the lower leagues with Atlético Clube de Portugal.

== International career ==
José Carlos earned one cap for Portugal, playing the second half of a 1–1 friendly draw with West Germany in Lisbon on 29 August 1990.

== Personal life ==
José Carlos's son, Filipe, was also a footballer. He too represented Belenenses and Atlético.

José Carlos was also president of APJA (association for amateur footballers), vice-president of SJPF (association for professional footballers) and worked as a pundit for Sport TV.
