= Estádio José Gomes =

Football stadium in Amadora, Portugal

Coordinates: 38°45′7″N 9°13′41″W

- Estádio da Reboleira
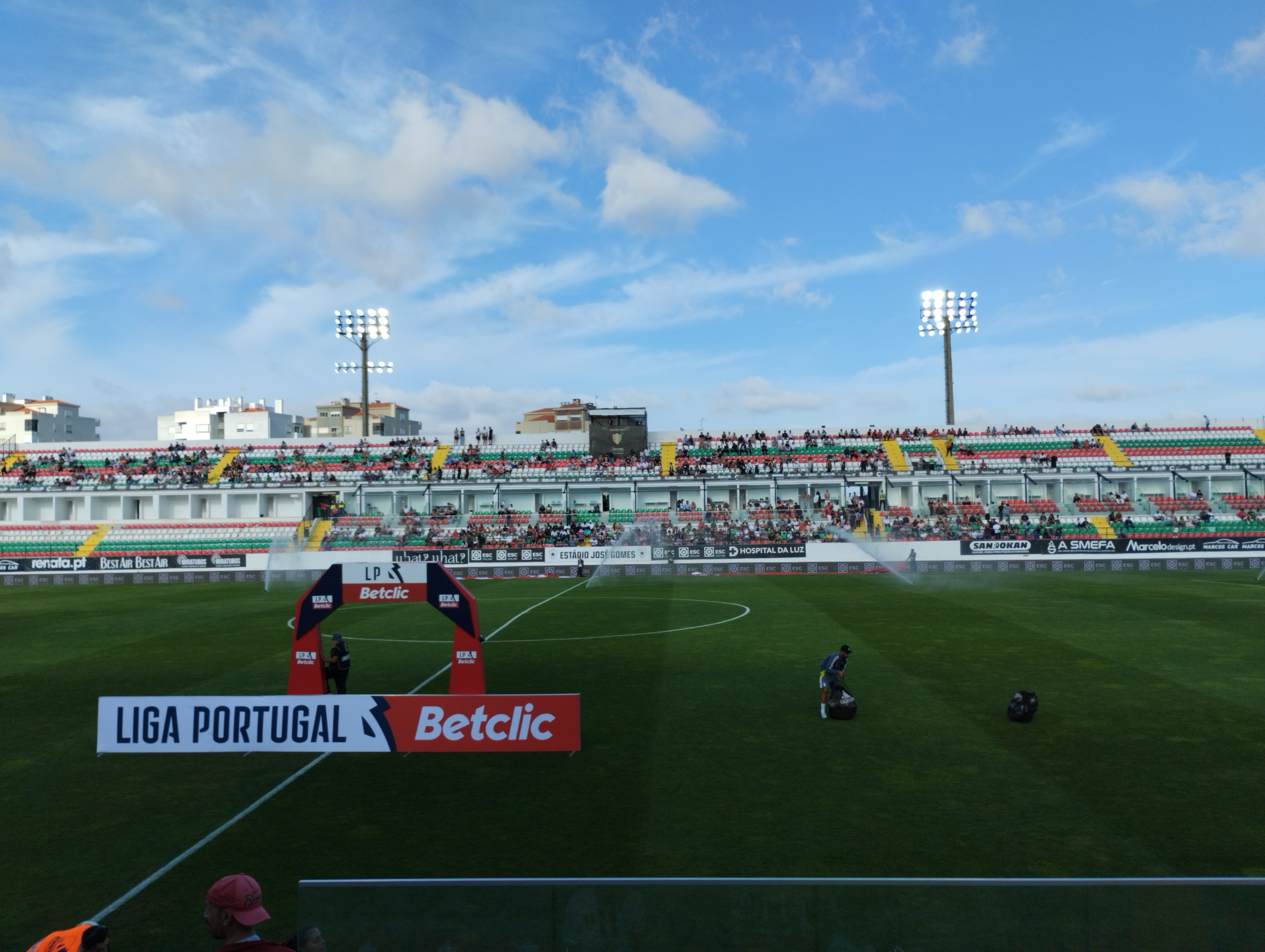
- Interactive map of Estádio José Gomes
- Full name: Estádio José Gomes
- Location: Amadora, Portugal
- Owner: Cidade da Amadora
- Capacity: 9,288
- Surface: Grass
- Record attendance: 7,331 (18 May 2024); C.F. Estrela da Amadora 1–0 Gil Vicente F.C.
- Field size: 105 x 68 m

Construction
- Built: 1934
- Opened: 1957
- Architect: José Gomes

Tenant
- C.F. Estrela da Amadora

The Estádio José Gomes, informally known as Estádio da Reboleira, after its location, is the stadium of the Portuguese football team C.F. Estrela da Amadora and it has a capacity of 9,288.

== See also ==
- List of football stadiums in Portugal
