= Lima (footballer, born 1962) =

Brazilian footballer

Personal information
- Full name: Adesvaldo José de Lima
- Date of birth: 17 September 1962 (age 64)
- Place of birth: Camapuã, Brazil
- Height: 1.77 m (5 ft 10 in)
- Position: Forward

Youth career
- 1979–1981: Operário-MS

Senior career*
Years	Team	Apps	(Gls)
1981–1984	Operário-MS		
1984–1986	Corithians	74	(36)
1985	→ Santos (loan)		
1987–1988	Grêmio		
1988–1991	Benfica	36	(4)
1992	Internacional		
1993	America		
1994	Cerro Porteño		
1994	Vitória		
1996	Farroupilha		
1997	Brasil de Pelotas		
- * Club domestic league appearances and goals

Adesvaldo José de Lima (born 17 September 1962), commonly known as Lima , is a Brazilian retired footballer who played as forward.

== Career ==
Born in Camapuã, Mato Grosso do Sul, Lima started in Operário-MS. After being top-scorer of the 1982 and 1983 Campeonato Sul-Mato-Grossense, he joined Corithians in 1984, who loaned him to Santos. In 1987, he moved to Grêmio, where he would take part in Campeonato Gaúcho titles in 1987 and 1988, being top-scorer in the latter, alongside Valdo, Cuca, Astengo and Mazarópi.

He then moved to Portugal, joining Benfica, where he would reunite with Valdo, playing sparsely throughout three seasons, but notably scoring three goals in the 1989–90 European Cup campaign, on the way to the final. In 1991, he signed with Internacional, winning another Campeonato Gaúcho, and then moving through a number of clubs, retiring at age 35.

In 2012, he ran for the city council in Campo Grande for the Brazilian Labour Party.
