= Paulinho (footballer, born 1966) =

Angolan-Portuguese player and manager

Personal information
- Full name: Paulo José Ramos Mendes
- Date of birth: 26 May 1966 (age 60)
- Place of birth: Luanda, Angola
- Height: 1.80 m (5 ft 11 in)
- Position: Defender

Senior career*
Years	Team	Apps	(Gls)
1987–1988	Estoril		
1989–1990	Benfica	6	(1)
1990–1991	Nacional	38	(1)
1991–1993	Estoril	63	(6)
1993–1997	Estrela da Amadora	101	(0)
1997–2001	Salgueiros	88	(3)

International career
1989	Portugal U21	1	(0)
1992	Portugal	1	(0)

Managerial career
- 2002–2005: Associação Torre
- 2005–2009: O Elvas
- 2009–2010: Pero Pinheiro
- 2011–2012: Oeiras
- 2012–2015: 1º de Dezembro
- 2015–2016: Pinhalnovense
- 2016: Oriental
- 2017: Beijing Renhe (assistant)
- 2017–2018: Shenzhen (athletic coach)
- 2020–2021: 1º Dezembro
- 2021–2022: SOA
- 2022–2023: B-SAD (assistant)
- 2023–2023: B-SAD
- * Club domestic league appearances and goals

Paulo José Ramos Mendes (born 26 May 1966), known as Paulinho, is a Portuguese football manager and a former player of Angolan descent. He was most recently the manager of B-SAD.

He played 12 seasons and 296 games in the Primeira Liga for Estrela da Amadora, Salgueiros, Estoril, Nacional and Benfica.

== Career ==
Paulinho made his Primeira Liga debut for S.L. Benfica on 26 August 1989 in a game against Vitória de Guimarães. He also played one game for Benfica in the 1989–90 European Cup against Derry City.

He played his only game for the Portugal national team on 12 February 1992 in a friendly game against Netherlands.
