= Carlos Silva Valente =

Portuguese football referee

- Full name: Carlos Alberto Silva Valente
- Born: 25 July 1948; Setúbal, Portugal
- Died: 20 June 2024 (aged 75)

Domestic
Years	League	Role
1982–1994	Primeira Liga	Referee

International
Years	League	Role
1984–1992	FIFA–listed	Referee

Carlos Alberto Silva Valente (25 July 1948 – 20 June 2024) was a Portuguese football referee. He is known for having refereed three matches in the FIFA World Cup, one in the 1986 and two in the 1990.

Preceded by (Finland) Eero Aho	1989 European Competition for Women's Football Final (Portugal) Carlos Silva Valente	Succeeded by (Scotland) Jim McCluskey
