= Vata Matanu Garcia =

Angolan footballer and manager

Vata
Personal information
- Full name: Vata Matanu Garcia
- Date of birth: 19 March 1961 (age 65)
- Place of birth: Damba, Angola
- Height: 1.79 m (5 ft 10 in)
- Position: Striker

Senior career*
| Years | Team | Apps | (Gls) |
| 1980–1983 | Progresso | | |
| 1983–1984 | Águeda | | |
| 1984–1988 | Varzim | 77 | (26) |
| 1988–1991 | Benfica | 92 | (42) |
| 1991–1992 | Estrela Amadora | 17 | (3) |
| 1992–1993 | Torreense | 23 | (0) |
| 1994 | Floriana | 5 | (2) |
| 1994–1997 | Gelora Dewata | 60 | (29) |
| 1998–1999 | Persija | | |
| 1999–2000 | Gelora Dewata | | |
| Total | | | (90) |

International career
| 1985–1993 | Angola | 65 | (20) |
- * Club domestic league appearances and goals

Vata Matanu Garcia (born 19 March 1961), known simply as Vata, is an Angolan former professional footballer who played as a striker.

He spent most of his professional career in Portugal, most notably at Benfica.

== Club career ==
Born in Damba, Uíge Province, Vata started his football career at Progresso Associação do Sambizanga. After a good run in Portugal with Varzim SC, he caught the eye of Primeira Liga club S.L. Benfica, signing with them for 1988–89 and being crowned the season's top scorer in his first year.

In the following campaign's European Cup campaign, Vata achieved his most (in)famous moment: after the 1–2 defeat at Olympique de Marseille in the semifinals, he scored from a left-side corner kick, putting the ball in the net with his right arm as Benfica won on the away goals rule with that single goal.

After two more seasons in Portugal, with C.F. Estrela da Amadora and S.C.U. Torreense, 38-year-old Vata retired in 1999 after spells with Malta's Floriana Football Club and Gelora Dewata and Persija Jakarta (Indonesia, where he also would act as player-coach). In 1993–94 he also had a brief go at Futsal, in the United States.

As a full-time manager, Vata worked with Guntur Bali, winning the league in his only season and also coaching in that country Mitra Kukar F.C. and Kalimantan (in 2004–05). He also worked at the International School in Bali in 2000 and at the European Football Institute in Australia, as a high-performance coach of both the senior and reserve teams.

== International career ==
Vata was capped 65 times on the Angola national team, including one 1990 FIFA World Cup qualifying match.

== Honours ==
Benfica

- Portuguese League: 1988–89, 1990–91
- Portuguese Supercup: 1986
- European Cup runner-up 1989–90

Floriana

- Maltese Cup: 1993–94

Deltras

- Indonesian League: 1999–2000 (as coach)

Individual

- Portuguese League: Top Scorer 1988–89 (16 goals)
- Indonesian League: Top Scorer 1995–96
