= Valdo (footballer, born 1964) =

Brazilian footballer (born 1964)

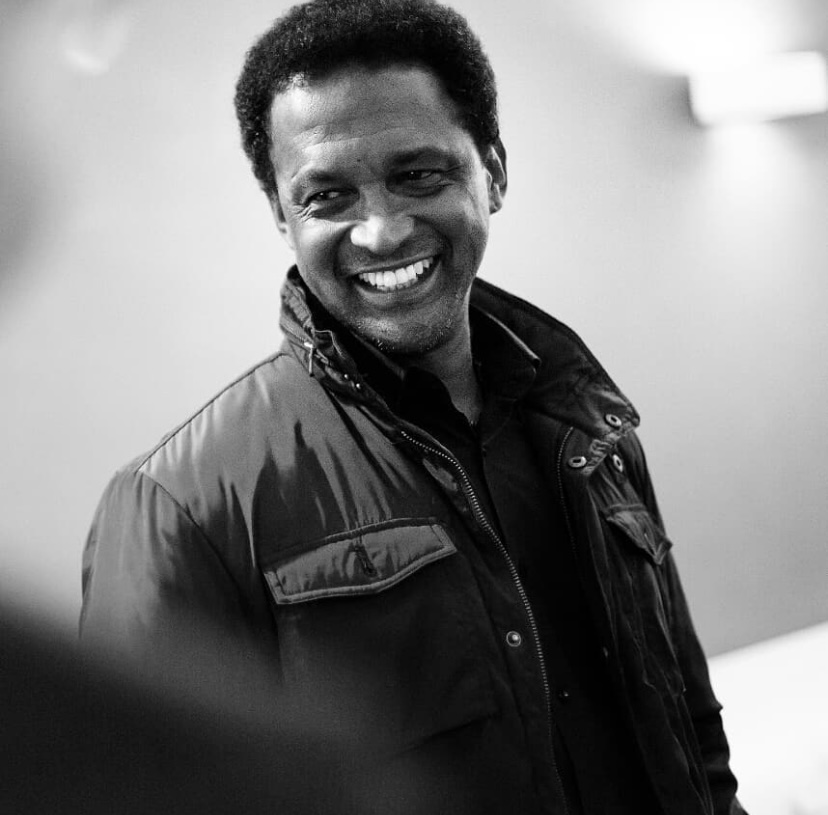
- Valdo in 2011

Personal information
- Full name: Valdo Cândido Filho
- Date of birth: 12 January 1964 (age 62)
- Place of birth: Siderópolis, Brazil
- Height: 1.73 m (5 ft 8 in)
- Position: Midfielder

Senior career*
Years	Team	Apps	(Gls)
1983	Figueirense		
1984–1988	Grêmio	96	(18)
1988–1991	Benfica	78	(11)
1991–1995	Paris Saint Germain	115	(10)
1995–1997	Benfica	60	(9)
1997–1998	Nagoya Grampus Eight	26	(4)
1998–2000	Cruzeiro	56	(7)
2000–2001	Santos	19	(1)
2001–2002	Atlético Mineiro	23	(1)
2002	Juventude	12	(2)
2003	São Caetano		
2003–2004	Botafogo	44	(2)
Total		519	(65)

International career
1987–1993	Brazil	45	(4)

Managerial career
- 2009: União Rondonópolis
- 2011: Maringá
- 2012: Serra Macaense
- 2014–2015: MC Alger (assistant)
- 2018–2021: Congo
Medal record
Men's football
Representing Brazil
Olympic Games
Silver medal – second place	1988 Seoul	Team competition
Pan American Games
Gold medal – first place	1987 Indianapolis	Team competition
- * Club domestic league appearances and goals

Valdo Cândido Filho (born 12 January 1964), known simply as Valdo, is a Brazilian football manager and former professional footballer who played as a midfielder.

In a senior playing career spanning more than two decades, he played in Brazil, Portugal, France and Japan, and was notably associated with Grêmio, Benfica and Paris Saint-Germain. He later managed the Congo national football team from 2018 to 2021.

Valdo earned more than 40 caps for the Brazil national football team, representing his country at two FIFA World Cup tournaments and two Copa América editions. He was part of the Brazil squad that won the 1989 Copa América.

== Club career ==
Born in Siderópolis, Santa Catarina, Valdo began playing football with Figueirense Futebol Clube, making his professional debuts with Grêmio Football Porto-Alegrense, with which he won four consecutive Rio Grande do Sul Leagues.

In the summer of 1988 he signed with S.L. Benfica of Portugal alongside compatriot Ricardo Gomes, a central defender. Both were important elements in their debut season as the team won the Primeira Liga championship, a feat which was again accomplished in 1991, with the midfielder netting five goals in 26 matches.

Both Valdo and Gomes left for Paris Saint-Germain F.C. in the 1991 summer, and both would return four years later to the Lisbon side, having won a total of four titles, including the 1993–94 edition of the Ligue 1. In his second Benfica spell, he played in 30 league matches in each of his two seasons, winning the Taça de Portugal in 1996.

Aged 32, Valdo joined J1 League club Nagoya Grampus Eight, and returned to his country after two slow years. He would continue to play until the age of 40, representing six teams in quick succession (he ended his career after having helped Botafogo de Futebol e Regatas achieve its return to the Série A).

Valdo began working as a manager in 2009, in Brazilian amateur football. Five years later, he rejoined his former Benfica boss Artur Jorge at MC Alger from Algeria.

== International career ==
Valdo earned 45 caps for the Brazil national team, during six years. Before having made his first appearance he was called to the 1986 FIFA World Cup squad, but did not play one single second.

In the 1990 edition in Italy, Valdo was already a starter, and took part in the country's four matches in the tournament, including the round-of-16 1–0 loss against Argentina.

== Style of play ==
Valdo was a technically skilled midfielder, noted for his vision, passing and physical condition. Originally used as a left winger during his early career, he was later moved into a central playmaking role at Grêmio under Rubens Minelli.

== Personal life ==
Upon retiring from football, Valdo settled in Portugal with his Portuguese wife. The couple had one daughter, Tatiele, who died in a car accident at only 13.

== Career statistics ==
=== Club ===
Appearances and goals by club, season and competition
Club	Season	League			National cup		League cup		Total	
Club	Season	Division	Apps	Goals	Apps	Goals	Apps	Goals	Apps	Goals
Grêmio	1984	Série A	5	0					5	0
Grêmio	1985	Série A	19	4					19	4
Grêmio	1986	Série A	27	6					27	6
Grêmio	1987	Série A	15	2					15	2
Grêmio	1988	Série A	30	6					30	6
Grêmio	Total		96	18					96	18
Benfica	1988–89	Primeira Liga	28	3					28	3
Benfica	1989–90	Primeira Liga	24	3					24	3
Benfica	1990–91	Primeira Liga	26	5					26	5
Benfica	Total		78	11					78	11
Paris Saint-Germain	1991–92	Ligue 1	32	3					32	3
Paris Saint-Germain	1992–93	Ligue 1	28	3					28	3
Paris Saint-Germain	1993–94	Ligue 1	30	1					30	1
Paris Saint-Germain	1994–95	Ligue 1	25	3			3	2	28	5
Paris Saint-Germain	Total		115	10			3	2	118	12
Benfica	1995–96	Primeira Liga	30	4					30	4
Benfica	1996–97	Primeira Liga	30	4					30	4
Benfica	Total		60	8					60	8
Nagoya Grampus Eight	1997	J1 League	16	2	1	0	4	0	21	2
Nagoya Grampus Eight	1998	J1 League	10	2	0	0	4	1	14	3
Nagoya Grampus Eight	Total		26	4	1	0	8	1	35	5
Cruzeiro	1998	Série A	30	6					30	6
Cruzeiro	1999	Série A	16	1					16	1
Cruzeiro	Total		47	7					46	7
Santos	2000	Série A	19	1					19	1
Atlético Mineiro	2001	Série A	23	1					23	1
Juventude	2002	Série A	12	2					12	2
São Caetano	2003	Série A	0	0					0	0
Botafogo	2004	Série A	44	2					44	2
Career total			519	64	1	0	11	3	531	67

=== International ===
Appearances and goals by national team and year
National team	Year	Apps	Goals
Brazil	1987	11	4
Brazil	1988	6	0
Brazil	1989	17	0
Brazil	1990	7	0
Brazil	1991	0	0
Brazil	1992	2	0
Brazil	1993	2	0
Total		45	4

== Honours ==
Grêmio

- Campeonato Gaúcho: 1985, 1986, 1987, 1988

Benfica

- Primeira Liga: 1988–89, 1990–91
- Taça de Portugal: 1995–96; runner-up 1988–89, 1996–97
- Supertaça Cândido de Oliveira: 1989
- European Cup: runner-up 1989–90

Paris Saint-Germain

- Ligue 1: 1993–94
- Coupe de France: 1992–93, 1994–95
- Coupe de la Ligue: 1994–95

Cruzeiro

- Campeonato Mineiro: 1998
- Recopa Sudamericana: 1999
- Copa Centro-Oeste: 1999

Brazil

- Copa América: 1989
- Pan American Games gold medal: 1987
- South American Pre-Olympic Tournament: 1987
- Rous Cup: 1987

Individual

- World Soccer World XI: 1990, 1991
- Bola de Prata (Silver Ball): 1998
