= 1988–89 Primeira Divisão =

55th season of top-tier Portuguese football

Primeira Divisão
- Season: 1988–89
- Champions: Benfica; 28th title
- Relegated: Fafe; Espinho; Farense; Leixões; Académico de Viseu
- European Cup: Benfica (first round)
- Cup Winners' Cup: Belenenses (first round)
- UEFA Cup: F.C. Porto (first round); Boavista (first round); Sporting CP (first round)
- Matches: 380
- Goals: 791 (2.08 per match)
- Top goalscorer: Vata (16 goals)

The 1988–89 Primeira Divisão was the 55th season of top-tier football in Portugal.

== Overview ==
It was contested by 20 teams, and S.L. Benfica won the championship.

== League standings ==
Pos	Team	Pld	W	D	L	GF	GA	GD	Pts	Qualification or relegation
1	Benfica (C)	38	27	9	2	60	15	+45	63	Qualification to European Cup first round
2	Porto	38	21	14	3	52	17	+35	56	Qualification to UEFA Cup first round
3	Boavista	38	19	11	8	56	29	+27	49	Qualification to UEFA Cup first round
4	Sporting CP	38	18	9	11	50	33	+17	45	Qualification to UEFA Cup first round
5	Vitória de Setúbal	38	15	12	11	44	37	+7	42	
6	Braga	38	14	12	12	42	37	+5	40	
7	Belenenses	38	13	14	11	44	35	+9	40	Qualification to Cup Winners' Cup first round
8	Estrela da Amadora	38	13	13	12	33	41	−8	39	
9	Vitória de Guimarães	38	14	10	14	39	33	+6	38	
10	Nacional	38	12	12	14	43	49	−6	36	
11	Portimonense	38	12	11	15	33	37	−4	35	
12	Marítimo	38	10	15	13	40	41	−1	35	
13	Chaves	38	12	10	16	37	41	−4	34	
14	Penafiel	38	10	13	15	32	39	−7	33	
15	Beira-Mar	38	10	13	15	29	36	−7	33	
16	Fafe (R)	38	9	14	15	29	47	−18	32	Relegation to Segunda Divisão
17	Espinho (R)	38	12	8	18	45	57	−12	32	Relegation to Segunda Divisão
18	Farense (R)	38	10	11	17	34	51	−17	31	Relegation to Segunda Divisão
19	Leixões (R)	38	7	14	17	29	46	−17	28	Relegation to Segunda Divisão
20	Académico de Viseu (R)	38	5	9	24	20	70	−50	19	Relegation to Segunda Divisão

Source: foradejogo.net, RSSSF
Rules for classification: 1st points, 2nd head-to-head, 3rd goals average
(C) Champions; (R) Relegated

== Results ==
Home \ Away	ACV	BEM	BEL	BEN	BOA	BRA	CHA	ESP	EST	FAF	FAR	LEI	MAR	NAC	PEN	PTM	POR	SCP	VGU	VSE
Académico de Viseu		0–0	1–1	0–1	0–0	1–5	0–1	0–2	2–2	0–2	3–1	1–0	0–0	0–2	1–0	0–1	0–0	2–2	2–1	0–1
Beira-Mar	2–1		1–0	0–1	0–2	3–0	2–0	1–0	1–0	1–1	2–2	1–0	3–2	0–0	2–1	2–0	0–0	1–2	1–2	0–0
Belenenses	3–0	3–0		0–1	0–3	1–1	4–2	2–0	1–0	1–1	2–0	2–0	2–2	1–1	2–1	4–0	1–1	0–3	1–1	0–0
Benfica	4–0	0–0	1–0		2–2	1–0	2–1	1–0	3–0	4–0	3–0	2–1	2–0	1–0	2–1	3–0	0–0	2–0	0–0	2–0
Boavista	2–0	1–0	0–1	2–1		2–0	4–0	1–0	2–0	3–1	1–1	2–2	5–1	0–2	1–0	1–0	4–1	2–0	0–1	2–0
Braga	0–1	1–0	2–0	0–0	0–2		0–0	3–1	1–0	2–2	4–2	1–0	2–1	1–1	0–0	1–1	0–1	0–0	2–0	0–0
Chaves	5–0	0–0	0–0	0–2	1–0	1–1		3–0	3–0	1–0	0–0	2–2	0–1	0–0	4–1	0–0	2–0	2–1	1–0	0–1
Espinho	1–0	2–1	1–1	2–2	2–2	4–1	2–1		2–1	1–1	3–1	2–0	2–1	4–0	1–1	1–0	1–2	0–2	1–2	1–5
Estrela da Amadora	2–1	0–0	2–1	1–2	1–1	1–3	1–1	0–0		0–0	1–0	0–3	1–1	4–1	2–1	1–0	2–2	0–0	1–0	1–1
Fafe	0–0	2–1	1–1	0–2	1–1	1–4	2–0	2–1	0–1		1–0	0–0	2–1	2–0	0–0	2–1	0–0	0–1	1–0	0–0
Farense	1–0	1–1	2–1	0–2	1–1	1–2	0–2	1–3	2–0	1–1		3–1	0–0	5–0	0–0	0–0	1–1	1–0	1–0	2–1
Leixões	2–0	1–1	0–2	0–2	0–0	0–0	0–0	4–0	0–0	1–1	1–0		0–0	2–2	1–1	1–2	0–3	0–2	2–1	1–0
Marítimo	4–0	3–1	1–0	1–1	1–0	0–0	0–1	1–1	1–2	3–0	2–1	0–1		0–0	2–0	2–1	0–0	1–1	2–0	0–1
Nacional	5–2	0–0	0–1	0–1	2–0	2–1	3–1	3–0	0–1	2–0	3–0	2–0	1–1		3–4	0–0	0–1	0–1	1–1	4–4
Penafiel	2–1	2–0	1–1	1–0	1–2	0–1	1–0	2–0	0–0	1–0	0–1	1–1	1–1	2–0		1–0	0–1	0–0	0–1	2–0
Portimonense	1–1	1–0	2–2	0–1	2–1	1–0	3–1	0–0	0–1	2–1	0–0	3–0	2–0	0–1	1–1		1–1	3–1	2–1	3–0
Porto	5–0	2–0	1–0	0–0	0–0	1–0	1–0	2–1	4–0	1–0	5–0	1–0	3–1	3–0	2–0	1–0		3–0	0–0	0–1
Sporting CP	2–0	0–0	0–0	0–2	1–1	2–0	3–0	3–1	0–1	3–1	1–0	2–0	2–2	4–0	4–1	1–0	1–2		1–0	4–3
Vitória de Guimarães	5–0	1–0	0–1	1–2	2–3	2–0	2–1	2–1	0–2	2–0	3–0	2–0	1–1	1–1	1–1	0–0	1–1	1–0		1–0
Vitória de Setúbal	2–0	2–1	2–1	2–2	1–0	1–3	2–0	2–1	1–1	4–0	0–2	2–2	1–0	0–1	0–0	3–0	0–0	1–0	0–0	

Legend: Blue = home team win; Yellow = draw; Red = away team win.

== Season statistics ==
=== Top goalscorers ===
Rank	Player	Club	Goals
1	(Angola) Vata	Benfica	16
2	(Portugal) Jorge Silva	Marítimo	15
2	(Paraguay) Amâncio	Vitória de Setúbal	15
4	(Portugal) Rui Águas	Porto	13
5	(Bulgaria) Radoslav Zdravkov	Chaves	12
6	(Portugal) Aparício	Vitória de Setúbal	11
6	(Brazil) Jorge Andrade	Boavista	11
6	(Brazil) Ivan	Sporting de Espinho	11
6	(Brazil) Paulinho Cascavel	Sporting CP	11
6	(Brazil) Chiquinho Carlos	Vitória de Guimarães	11
6	(Portugal) Rui Jordão	Vitória de Setúbal	11

== Attendances ==
#	Club	Average
1	Benfica	50,789
2	Porto	36,810
3	Sporting	32,263
4	Vitória SC	17,000
5	Beira-Mar	14,605
6	Braga	12,553
7	Vitória FC	12,105
8	Boavista	10,842
9	Farense	10,632
10	Estrela da Amadora	10,605
11	Leixões	9,868
12	Marítimo	9,789
13	Os Belenenses	8,895
14	Penafiel	8,895
15	Académico de Viseu	8,842
16	Espinho	8,474
17	Fafe	8,316
18	Chaves	7,842
19	Portimonense	7,079
20	CD Nacional	5,579
