= 1993 Taça de Portugal final =

- Event: 1992–93 Taça de Portugal
Benfica	Boavista
5	2
- Date: 10 June 1993
- Venue: Estádio Nacional, Oeiras
- Referee: Veiga Trigo (Beja)

The 1993 Taça de Portugal final was the final match of the 1992–93 Taça de Portugal, the 53rd season of the Taça de Portugal, the premier Portuguese football cup competition organized by the Portuguese Football Federation (FPF). The match was played on 10 June 1993 at the Estádio Nacional in Oeiras, and opposed two Primeira Liga sides: Benfica and Boavista. Benfica defeated Boavista 5–2 to claim the Taça de Portugal for a twenty-second time in their history.

In Portugal, the final was televised live on RTP. As a result of Benfica winning the Taça de Portugal, they qualified for the 1993 Supertaça Cândido de Oliveira where they took on 1992–93 Primeira Divisão winners Porto.

== Match ==
=== Details ===
10 June 1993
17:00 CEST

Benfica	5–2	Boavista
Paneira 32'; João Pinto 35'; Futre 48', 70'; Águas 88'		Brandão 44'; Tavares 57'

Estádio Nacional, Oeiras
Referee: Veiga Trigo (Beja)

Benfica	Boavista

GK	1	(Portugal) Neno
RB	2	(Portugal) António Veloso (c)
CB	4	(Brazil) Carlos Mozer
CB	3	(Brazil) William
LB	5	(Sweden) Stefan Schwarz
RM	7	(Portugal) Vítor Paneira	(substituted off) 77'
CM	6	(Portugal) Paulo Sousa
CM	11	(Portugal) Rui Costa	(substituted off) 77'
LM	8	(Portugal) João Pinto
CF	10	(Portugal) Paulo Futre
CF	9	(Portugal) Rui Águas
Substitutes:
GK	12	(Portugal) Silvino
DF	13	(Portugal) Hélder	(substituted on) 77'
MF	14	(Portugal) Hernâni
FW	15	(Portugal) Pacheco
FW	16	(Brazil) Isaías	(substituted on) 77'
Manager:
(Portugal) Toni

GK	1	(Federal Republic of Yugoslavia) Zoran Lemajić	(yellow card) 61'
RWB	2	(Portugal) Paulo Sousa		(substituted off) 46'
CB	6	(Portugal) António Nogueira
CB	4	(Portugal) José Garrido	(yellow card) (red card) 87'
LWB	3	(Portugal) António Caetano		(substituted off) 70'
MF	11	(Portugal) Rui Casaca (c)
SW	5	(Portugal) Rui Bento
MF	10	(Portugal) José Tavares
MF	7	(Portugal) Bobó
CF	8	(Brazil) Marlon Brandão
CF	9	(Brazil) Artur
Substitutes:
GK	12	(Portugal) Alfredo	(red card) 50'
DF	13	(Portugal) Nelo
MF	14	(Portugal) Litos
FW	15	(Nigeria) Ricky		(substituted on) 46'
FW	16	(Brazil) Nelson Bertollazzi		(substituted on) 70'
Manager:
(Portugal) Manuel José

1992–93 Taça de Portugal Winners
Benfica
22nd Title

Match officials

- Assistant referees:
- Fourth official:

Match rules

- 90 minutes.
- Maximum of two substitutions
