= 1992 Taça de Portugal final =

- Event: 1991–92 Taça de Portugal
Boavista	Porto
2	1
- Date: 24 May 1992
- Venue: Estádio Nacional, Oeiras
- Referee: Veiga Trigo (Beja)

The 1992 Taça de Portugal final was the final match of the 1991–92 Taça de Portugal, the 52nd season of the Taça de Portugal, the premier Portuguese football cup competition organized by the Portuguese Football Federation (FPF). The match was played on 24 May 1992 at the Estádio Nacional in Oeiras, and opposed two Primeira Liga sides from the same city: Boavista and Porto. Boavista defeated Porto 2–1 to claim the Taça de Portugal for a fourth time in their history.

In Portugal, the final was televised live on RTP. As a result of Boavista winning the Taça de Portugal, the Panteras qualified for the 1992 Supertaça Cândido de Oliveira where they took on their cup opponents who won the 1991–92 Primeira Divisão.

== Match ==
=== Details ===
24 May 1992
17:00 WEST

Boavista	2–1	Porto
Brandão 33'; Ricky 55'		Magalhães 52'

Estádio Nacional, Oeiras
Referee: Veiga Trigo (Beja)

Boavista	Porto

GK	1	(Portugal) Alfredo
RWB	2	(Portugal) Paulo Sousa
CB	3	(Portugal) Samuel
CB	4	(Portugal) Pedro Barny
LWB	5	(Portugal) Fernando Mendes
MF	11	(Portugal) Rui Casaca (c)
MF	6	(Portugal) José Tavares
MF	7	(Portugal) Bobó
FW	10	(Portugal) João Pinto	(substituted off) 82'
CF	9	(Nigeria) Ricky
FW	8	(Brazil) Marlon Brandão	(substituted off) 67'
Substitutes:
GK		(Portugal) Costinha
CB	13	(Portugal) António Nogueira	(substituted on) 67'
LM	15	(Portugal) Nelo	(substituted on) 82'
MF		(Portugal) Carlos Manuel
MF		(Portugal) Cobra
Manager:
(Portugal) Manuel José

GK	1	(Portugal) Vítor Baía
RB	2	(Portugal) João Pinto (c)
CB	4	(Brazil) Aloísio
CB	5	(Portugal) Fernando Couto
LB	3	(Brazil) Paulo Pereira	(substituted off) 66'
RM	6	(Portugal) Rui Filipe
CM	11	(Portugal) António André	(substituted off) 46'
CM	7	(Portugal) Jaime Magalhães
LM	10	(Romania) Ion Timofte
CF	8	(Bulgaria) Emil Kostadinov
CF	9	(Portugal) Domingos
Substitutes:
GK		(Portugal) Vítor Valente
DF		(Czech Republic) Lubomír Vlk	(substituted on) 66'
MF		(Portugal) Jorge Couto
MF		(Portugal) José Semedo	(substituted on) 46'
FW		(Brazil) Jorge Andrade
Manager:
(Brazil) Carlos Alberto Silva

1991–92 Taça de Portugal Winners
Boavista
4th Title

Match officials

- Assistant referees:
- Fourth official:

Match rules

- 90 minutes.
- 30 minutes of extra time if necessary.
- Maximum of two substitutions
- Five named substitutes
