= 1993–94 S.L. Benfica season =

Benfica
1993–94 season
- President: Jorge de Brito (until 7 January 1994); Manuel Damásio
- Head coach: Toni
- Stadium: Estádio da Luz
- Primeira Divisão: 1st
- Taça de Portugal: Quarter-finals
- Supertaça Cândido de Oliveira: Runners-up
- European Cup Winners' Cup: Semi-finals
- Top goalscorer: League: João Pinto (15); All: João Pinto (18)
- Highest home attendance: 80,000 vs Parma (29 March 1994)
- Lowest home attendance: 15,000 vs Braga (17 October 1993)
Home colours

The 1993–94 season was Sport Lisboa e Benfica's 90th season in existence and the club's 60th consecutive season in the top flight of Portuguese football. It involved Benfica competing in the Primeira Divisão and the Taça de Portugal. Benfica qualified for the European Cup Winners' Cup by winning previous Portuguese Cup. It covers the period between 1 July 1993 to 30 June 1994.

The season was marked by the events in his pre-season, as the club only made three signings. More importantly, however, the club lost regular starter Paulo Sousa and common substitute António Pacheco to Sporting CP due to unpaid salaries. Expectations around Benfica were not high, as Sporting and Porto were deemed the main contenders. After a poor start, however, a six-game winning streak granted them the top position in the league table. After going 15 league games unbeaten, a loss in April at Salgueiros and a draw at home against Estrela da Amadora made it necessary to win at the Estádio José Alvalade to retain their first-place position; a hat-trick from João Pinto in a 6–3 win put the title only six points away. On 25 May, a win over Gil Vicente ended the title race, with the club winning a record 30th league title.

== Season summary ==
The season that celebrated its 90th anniversary was also one of the club most tumultuous periods in recent history. In the summer, Paulo Sousa, João Pinto and António Pacheco unilaterally terminated their contracts, claiming unpaid salaries. While Pinto was successfully resigned with a pay increase, both Sousa and Pacheco never went back on their decision, subsequently moving to Lisbon rivals Sporting CP.

Sousa had been a frequent starter for Benfica, playing 35 games in the previous season and having joined the club as a 16-year-old. Pacheco was utilized more as a substitute, but had still amassed over 160 league games for Benfica. The players' "betrayal" and the increase in tension between the old rivals was labelled "Hot Summer of 1993", a clever throwback to the troubled times of the PREC, the post revolution in 1975.

With almost no new signings, and having lost Sousa, Pacheco and Paulo Futre, the team led by Toni was not seen as favourite in the title race. The season opened with the 1993 Supertaça Cândido de Oliveira, and with a win for both sides, a third match would be necessary. In the league, Benfica started by sharing points with Porto in O Clássico, but then tied again against much easier opponents, like Estoril and Beira-Mar; both clubs that played a crucial role in the previous season's title race. On the late part of September, the first win in the Primeira Liga kick-started a series of consecutive wins that helped the club climb from eighth in the league to first. A big loss in Setúbal served as warning, with the Lisbon-side then adding more consecutive wins, opening a three-point gap by the New Year.

In the first month of 1994, the club lost points against Gil Vicente and was eliminated from the Taça de Portugal by Belenenses, though this was not enough to stop their momentum, continuing to defend their first place with consecutive wins. In early March, with successive draws in the league and a hard-fought 4–4 draw in the quarter-finals of the Cup Winners' Cup, the club look like would be surpass by Sporting on the title race, with the distance now reduced to just one point. A loss against Salgueiros in April put both clubs equal on points, while in the European stage, the club was defeated by Parma in the semi-finals.

Benfica entered the Lisbon derby on 14 May with just a one-point advantage in the league table, knowing that a loss would cost them first place. João Pinto had one of his best performances with Benfica, scoring a hat-trick that effectively ended the title race in his club's favour. Only a few days later, away against Braga, the club secured its 30th league title, celebrating with the fans at the sold out Estádio Primeiro de Maio.

Carlos Mozer, an undisputed starter during the season, narrated the events in the club almanac: "We won the title with great difficulty, because Sporting had a young but good team, while Porto had the experience. At Benfica, our squad was strong. There were veterans like William, Veloso and Isaías, that taught the younger ones, like Rui Costa or João Pinto; who still had the will and pace to run all game. The coach was Toni, who I knew back from 1989. Benfica did not start well, and amassed three straight draws. Then he started winning in a awful manner. We did not play well, but we were winning games, until the notorious game in Alvalade, the 6–3. Everybody said that Sporting was going to win, because they had a younger team, and we were older; so we would not endure the difficult terrain. When everything looked like to be on their favour; we, with great calm and experience, reversed the game with a great performance from João Pinto. In that season, I also remember the campaign in the Cup Winners' Cup. We reach the semi-finals, after that crazy 4–4 in Leverkusen. We were drawn against Parma, and the Italians were always difficult. We won in the Estádio da Luz, but there, in Italy; I was sent-off early, on the 20th minute, with a double yellow. The first was fair, the second was not. If with eleven players was already hard, with one less, it was even harder."

== Competitions ==
Win Draw Loss Postponed

=== Overall record ===
| Competition | First match | Last match | Record | | | | | | | | |
| Competition | First match | Last match | G | W | D | L | GF | GA | GD | Win % | Source |
|---|---|---|---|---|---|---|---|---|---|---|---|
| Primeira Divisão | 22 August 1993 | 2 June 1994 | 34 | 23 | 8 | 3 | 73 | 25 | +48 | 67.65 | |
| Taça de Portugal | 5 December 1993 | 30 January 1994 | 3 | 2 | 0 | 1 | 10 | 3 | +7 | 66.67 | |
| Cup Winners' Cup | 15 September 1993 | 13 April 1994 | 8 | 4 | 3 | 1 | 15 | 10 | +5 | 50.00 | |
| Supertaça | 11 August 1993 | 15 August 1993 | 2 | 1 | 0 | 1 | 1 | 1 | +0 | 50.00 | |
| Total | | | 47 | 30 | 11 | 6 | 99 | 39 | +60 | 63.83 | |

=== Supertaça Cândido de Oliveira ===
| 11 August 1993 First leg | Benfica | 1–0 | Porto | Estádio da Luz, Lisbon |
| | Águas 84' | | | Referee: Carlos Valente (Setúbal) |

| 15 August 1993 Second leg | Porto | 1–0 | Benfica | Estádio das Antas, Porto |
| | Vinha 84' | | Mozer (yellow card) 42' (yellow-red card) 50' | Referee: Fortunato Azevedo (Braga) |

=== Primeira Divisão ===
==== League table ====
| Pos | Team | Pld | W | D | L | GF | GA | GD | Pts | Qualification or relegation |
|---|---|---|---|---|---|---|---|---|---|---|
| 1 | Benfica (C) | 34 | 23 | 8 | 3 | 73 | 25 | +48 | 54 | Qualification to Champions League group stage |
| 2 | Porto | 34 | 21 | 10 | 3 | 56 | 15 | +41 | 52 | Qualification to Cup Winners' Cup first round (Note: Porto qualified for the Cup Winners' Cup as Portuguese Cup winners) |
| 3 | Sporting CP | 34 | 23 | 5 | 6 | 71 | 29 | +42 | 51 | Qualification to UEFA Cup first round |
| 4 | Boavista | 34 | 16 | 6 | 12 | 46 | 31 | +15 | 38 | Qualification to UEFA Cup first round |
| 5 | Marítimo | 34 | 13 | 12 | 9 | 45 | 40 | +5 | 38 | Qualification to UEFA Cup first round |

Source: Primeira Divisão
Rules for classification: 1st points, 2nd head-to-head, 3rd goals average
(C) Champions

==== Results by round ====
| Round | 1 | 2 | 3 | 4 | 5 | 6 | 7 | 8 | 9 | 10 | 11 | 12 | 13 | 14 | 15 | 16 | 17 | 18 | 19 | 20 | 21 | 22 | 23 | 24 | 25 | 26 | 27 | 28 | 29 | 30 | 31 | 32 | 33 | 34 |
|---|---|---|---|---|---|---|---|---|---|---|---|---|---|---|---|---|---|---|---|---|---|---|---|---|---|---|---|---|---|---|---|---|---|---|
| Ground | A | H | A | H | H | A | H | A | H | A | H | A | H | A | H | A | H | H | A | H | A | A | H | A | H | A | H | A | H | A | H | A | H | A |
| Result | D | D | D | W | W | W | W | W | W | L | W | W | W | W | D | W | W | W | W | W | D | D | W | W | W | L | W | W | D | W | W | W | D | L |
| Position | 7 | 7 | 8 | 4 | 3 | 3 | 3 | 2 | 1 | 1 | 1 | 1 | 1 | 1 | 1 | 1 | 1 | 1 | 1 | 1 | 1 | 1 | 1 | 1 | 1 | 1 | 1 | 1 | 1 | 1 | 1 | 1 | 1 | 1 |

Source: ForaDeJogo
A = Away; H = Home; W = Win; D = Draw; L = Loss

==== Matches ====
| 22 August 1993 1 | Porto | 3–3 | Benfica | Porto |
| 20:30 | Vinha 8'; Pereira 62', 70' (pen.) | Report | Isaías 25', 63'; Águas 27' | Stadium: Estádio das Antas; Attendance: 50,000; Referee: Carlos Calheiros |

| 29 August 1993 2 | Benfica | 1–1 | Estoril | Lisbon |
| 20:00 | Águas 58' | Report | Ernie Tapai 87'; Carlos Manuel (red card) 58' | Stadium: Estádio da Luz; Attendance: 30,000; Referee: Vítor Reis |

| 11 September 1993 3 | Beira-Mar | 1–1 | Benfica | Aveiro |
| 19:00 | Dino 68' | Report | Isaías 78' | Stadium: Estádio Mário Duarte; Attendance: 4,000; Referee: Veiga Trigo |

| 19 September 1993 4 | Benfica | 4–1 | Farense | Lisbon |
| 20:00 | Brito 30'; Paneira 54' (pen.); Pinto 71'; Águas 89' | Report | Hassan 59' | Stadium: Estádio da Luz; Attendance: 30,000; Referee: Marques da Silva |

| 25 September 1993 5 | Benfica | 2–0 | Marítimo | Lisbon |
| 17:00 | Pinto 32'; Isaías 90' | Report | | Stadium: Estádio da Luz; Attendance: 25,000; Referee: António Rola |

| 5 October 1993 6 | Famalicão | 1–5 | Benfica | Vila Nova de Famalicão |
| 20:00 | Amarildo 62' | Report | Xavier 25'; Pinto 28'; Isaías 66'; Águas 70'; Paneira 87' | Stadium: Estádio Municipal 22 de Junho; Attendance: 9,000; Referee: José Pratas |

| 17 October 1993 7 | Benfica | 2–0 | Braga | Lisbon |
| 19:00 | William 2'; Isaías 62' | Report | Barroso (yellow card) 0' (yellow-red card) 50' | Stadium: Estádio da Luz; Attendance: 15,000; Referee: José Rufino |

| 25 October 1993 8 | Paços de Ferreira | 1–2 | Benfica | Paços de Ferreira |
| 20:00 | Rudež 61' | Report | Aílton 80'; Pinto 88' | Stadium: Estádio da Mata Real; Attendance: 8,000; Referee: Carlos Calheiros |

| 30 October 1993 9 | Benfica | 4–1 | Salgueiros | Lisbon |
| 19:45 | Hélder 25'; Pinto 30'; Rui Costa 47'; Águas 88' | Report | Miguel Simão 34' | Stadium: Estádio da Luz; Attendance: 25,000; Referee: Carlos Valente |

| 21 November 1993 10 | Vitória Setúbal | 5–2 | Benfica | Setúbal |
| 19:00 | Yekini 29', 73'; Araújo 39'; Gomes 52'; Conde 82' | Report | Paneira 55'; Aílton 66' | Stadium: Estádio do Bonfim; Attendance: 20,000; Referee: José Pratas |

| 28 November 1993 11 | Benfica | 3–0 | Belenenses | Lisbon |
| 20:00 | Pinto 35'; Mozer 43'; Paneira 52' | Report | | Stadium: Estádio da Luz; Attendance: 20,000; Referee: Pinto Correia |

| 10 December 1993 22 | Estrela da Amadora | 0–1 | Benfica | Lisbon |
| 19:00 | | Report | Rui Costa 77' | Stadium: Estádio da Reboleira; Attendance: 13,000; Referee: António Marçal |

| 18 December 1993 13 | Benfica | 2–1 | Sporting CP | Lisbon |
| 20:00 | Yuran 50'; Isaías 84' | Report | Figo 29'; Capucho (yellow card) 0' (yellow-red card) 34' | Stadium: Estádio da Luz; Attendance: 80,000; Referee: Jorge Coroado |

| 29 December 1993 14 | União da Madeira | 0–2 | Benfica | Funchal |
| 19:00 | | Report | Isaías 20'; Aílton 29'; Isaías (yellow card) 0' (yellow-red card) 77' | Stadium: Estádio dos Barreiros; Attendance: 7,000; Referee: Carlos Valente |

| 9 January 1994 15 | Benfica | 0–0 | Gil Vicente | Lisbon |
| 18:00 | | Report | | Stadium: Estádio da Luz; Attendance: 20,000; Referee: Soares Dias |

| 16 January 1994 16 | Vitória Guimarães | 1–2 | Benfica | Guimarães |
| 19:00 | Tlemçani 90' | Report | Paneira 35' (yellow card) 0' (yellow-red card) 87'; Aílton 44' | Stadium: Estádio D. Afonso Henriques; Attendance: 5,000; Referee: Veiga Trigo |

| 23 January 1994 17 | Benfica | 3–1 | Boavista | Lisbon |
| 20:00 | Pinto 10', 76'; Aílton 29' | Report | Tavares 60' | Stadium: Estádio da Luz; Attendance: 45,000; Referee: Carlos Valente |

| 6 February 1994 18 | Benfica | 2–0 | Porto | Lisbon |
| 20:00 | Aílton 37'; Rui Costa 55' | Report | Fernando Couto (red card) 40' | Stadium: Estádio da Luz; Attendance: 60,000; Referee: Veiga Trigo |

| 13 February 1994 19 | Estoril | 0–3 | Benfica | Estoril |
| 20:30 | Andrade (yellow card) 0' (yellow-red card) 50' | Report | Aílton 74', 88'; Yuran 84' | Stadium: Estádio António Coimbra da Mota; Attendance: 15,000; Referee: Pinto Correia |

| 20 February 1994 20 | Benfica | 1–0 | Beira Mar | Lisbon |
| 19:45 | Paneira 87' (pen.) | Report | | Stadium: Estádio da Luz; Attendance: 40,000; Referee: Carlos Calheiros |

| 26 February 1994 21 | Farense | 0–0 | Benfica | Faro |
| 19:45 | Nader (yellow card) 0' (yellow-red card) 53' | Report | Schwarz (yellow card) 0' (yellow-red card) 53' | Stadium: Estádio de São Luís; Attendance: 15,000; Referee: Bento Marques |

| 5 March 1994 22 | Marítimo | 1–1 | Benfica | Funchal |
| 19:00 | Hector 53' | Report | Pinto 70' | Stadium: Estádio dos Barreiros; Attendance: 15,000; Referee: Fortunado Azevedo |

| 12 March 1994 23 | Benfica | 8–0 | Famalicão | Lisbon |
| 19:30 | Celestino 25' (o.g.), 72' (o.g.); Rui Costa 31'; Aílton 33'; Yuran 59', 87'; Mozer 70'; Águas 73' | Report | | Stadium: Estádio da Luz; Attendance: 25,000; Referee: Lucílio Baptista |

| 24 March 1994 24 | Braga | 0–2 | Benfica | Braga |
| 19:45 | | Report | Isaías 44'; Aílton 77' | Stadium: Estádio 1º de Maio; Attendance: 15,000; Referee: Carlos Valente |

| 26 March 1994 25 | Benfica | 2–1 | Paços de Ferreira | Lisbon |
| 19:45 | Pinto 18'; Isaías 39' | Report | Helcinho Conegudes 28'; (yellow card) 0' (yellow-red card) 83' | Stadium: Estádio da Luz; Attendance: 25,000; Referee: Juvenal Silvestre |

| 9 April 1994 26 | Salgueiros | 1–0 | Benfica | Porto |
| 20:45 | Sá Pinto 85' | Report | | Stadium: Estádio Prof. Dr. José Vieira de Carvalho; Attendance: 5,000; Referee: Lourenço Ferreira |

| 25 April 1994 27 | Benfica | 2–0 | Vitória Setúbal | Lisbon |
| 19:45 | Schwarz 11'; Kulkov 20' (pen.) | Report | | Stadium: Estádio da Luz; Attendance: 30,000; Referee: João Mesquita |

| 30 April 1994 28 | Belenenses | 0–2 | Benfica | Lisbon |
| 21:00 | | Report | Mozer 10'; Aílton 46' | Stadium: Estádio do Restelo; Attendance: 5,000; Referee: Vítor Pereira |

| 8 May 1994 29 | Benfica | 1–1 | Estrela da Amadora | Lisbon |
| 18:15 | Isaías 12' | Report | Mário Jorge 64' | Stadium: Estádio da Luz; Attendance: 35,000; Referee: Pinto Correia |

| 14 May 1994 30 | Sporting CP | 3–6 | Benfica | Lisbon |
| 21:00 | Cadete 8'; Figo 35'; Balakov 80' (pen.) | Report | Pinto 30', 37', 44'; Isaías 48', 57'; Hélder 74' | Stadium: Estádio de Alvalade; Attendance: 60,000; Referee: António Marçal |

| 21 May 1994 31 | Benfica | 1–0 | União da Madeira | Lisbon |
| 19:00 | Rui Costa 68' | Report | Jokanović (yellow card) 0' (yellow-red card) 81' | Stadium: Estádio da Luz; Attendance: 55,000; Referee: Mário Leal |

| 25 May 1994 32 | Gil Vicente | 0–3 | Benfica | Braga |
| 20:15 | | Report | Pinto 4', 74'; Kulkov 84' | Stadium: Estádio 1º de Maio; Attendance: 30,000; Referee: José Pratas |

| 25 May 1994 33 | Benfica | 0–0 | Vitória Guimarães | Lisbon |
| 20:30 | | Report | | Stadium: Estádio da Luz; Attendance: 120,000; Referee: Carlos Valente |

| 2 June 1994 34 | Boavista | 1–0 | Benfica | Porto |
| 20:00 | Ricky 80' | Report | | Stadium: Estádio do Bessa; Attendance: 30,000; Referee: António Rola |

=== Taça de Portugal ===
| 5 December 1993 Fourth Rd | Benfica | 4–0 | Estoril | Lisbon |
| 18:00 | Yuran 19'; Aílton 58'; Andrade 68' (o.g.); Paneira 84' | Report | Litos (yellow card) 44' (yellow-red card) 54' | Stadium: Estádio da Luz; Attendance: 20,000; Referee: Vítor Pereira |

| 23 December 1993 Fifth Rd | União da Madeira | 1–5 (a.e.t.) | Benfica | Funchal |
| 19:45 | Bosančić 65' (pen.) | Report | Isaías 37'; Águas 94'; Rui Costa 95'; Aílton 101', 109' | Stadium: Estádio dos Barreiros; Attendance: 8,000; Referee: Veiga Trigo |

| 30 January 1994 Sixth Rd | Os Belenenses | 2–1 | Benfica | Lisbon |
| 20:30 | Airez 11'; Luiz Gustavo 30' | Report | Pinto 6' | Stadium: Estádio do Restelo; Referee: Vítor Pereira |

=== UEFA Cup Winners' Cup ===
==== First round ====
| 15 September 1993 First leg | Benfica (Portugal) | 1–0 | (Poland) GKS Katowice | Estádio da Luz, Lisbon |
| 19;45 | Águas 88' | Report | | Attendance: 10,000; Referee: Karl Finzinger |

| 29 September 1993 Second leg | GKS Katowice (Poland) | 1–1 (1–2 agg.) | (Portugal) Benfica | Stadion GKS Katowice, Katowice |
| 19;45 | Kucz 45' | Report | Paneira 70' | Attendance: 7,000; Referee: Aron Schmidhuber |

==== Second round ====
| 20 October 1993 First leg | Benfica (Portugal) | 3–1 | (Bulgaria) CSKA Sofia | Estádio da Luz, Lisbon |
| 19;45 | Rui Costa 27', 37'; Schwarz 90' | Report | Andonov 60' | Attendance: 40,000; Referee: Patrick Kelly |

| 3 November 1993 Second leg | CSKA Sofia (Bulgaria) | 1–3 (6–2 agg.) | (Portugal) Benfica | Vasil Levski National Stadium, Sofia |
| 19;45 | Andonov 56' | Report | Rui Costa 32'; Pinto 73'; Yuran 88' | Attendance: 20,000; Referee: Rune Pedersen |

==== Quarter-finals ====
| 1 March 1994 First leg | Benfica (Portugal) | 1–1 | (Germany) Bayer Leverkusen | Estádio da Luz, Lisbon |
| 21:15 | Isaías 90' | Report | Happe 66' | Attendance: 80,000; Referee: Pierluigi Pairetto (Italy) |

| 15 March 1994 Second leg | Bayer Leverkusen (Germany) | 4–4 (5–5 agg.) | (Portugal) Benfica | Ulrich-Haberland-Stadion, Leverkusen |
| 20:30 | Kirsten 24', 80'; Schuster 57'; Hapal 82' | Report | Xavier 59'; Pinto 60'; Kulkov 78', 85' | Attendance: 21,000; Referee: James McCluskey (Scotland) |

==== Semi-finals ====
| 29 March 1994 First leg | Benfica (Portugal) | 2–1 | (Italy) Parma | Estádio da Luz, Lisbon |
| 21:00 | Isaías 11'; Rui Costa 60' | Report | Zola 13' | Attendance: 80,000; Referee: Bernd Heynemann (Germany) |

| 13 April 1994 Second leg | Parma (Italy) | 1–0 (2–2 agg.) | (Portugal) Benfica | Stadio Ennio Tardini, Parma |
| 17:45 | Sensini 74' | Report | Mozer (yellow card) 0' (yellow-red card) 33' | Attendance: 21,500; Referee: Mario van der Ende (Netherlands) |

=== Friendlies ===
| 31 July 1993 | Manchester United | 0–1 | Benfica | Manchester |
| | | | | Stadium: Old Trafford |

| 3 August 1993 | Benfica | 2–1 | Cruzeiro | Lisbon |
| | | | | Stadium: Estádio da Luz |

| 18 August 1993 Pepsi Cup | Benfica | 2–1 | Barcelona | Lisbon |
| | Rui Águas 49'; Aílton Delfino 72' | | 55' Romário | Stadium: Estádio da Luz |

== Player statistics ==
The squad for the season consisted of the players listed in the tables below, as well as staff member Toni(manager)

Note 1: Note: Flags indicate national team as defined under FIFA eligibility rules. Players may hold more than one non-FIFA nationality.

Note 2: Players with squad numbers marked ‡ joined the club during the 1992-93 season via transfer, with more details in the following section.

| No. | Pos | Nat | Player | Total | | Primeira Divisão | | Taça de Portugal | | Cup Winners' Cup | | Supertaça | |
| No. | Pos | Nat | Player | Apps | Goals | Apps | Goals | Apps | Goals | Apps | Goals | Apps | Goals |
|---|---|---|---|---|---|---|---|---|---|---|---|---|---|
| 1 | GK | (Portugal) POR | Silvino | 4 | -3 | 1 | 0 | 3 | -3 | 0 | 0 | 0 | 0 |
| 1 | GK | (Portugal) POR | Neno | 41 | -35 | 33 | -24 | 0 | 0 | 8 | -10 | 0 | -1 |
| 2 | DF | (Portugal) POR | António Veloso | 30 | 0 | 21 | 0 | 2 | 0 | 5 | 0 | 2 | 0 |
| 2 | DF | (Portugal) POR | Abel Xavier | 33 | 2 | 25 | 1 | 0 | 0 | 8 | 1 | 0 | 0 |
| 2 | DF | (Portugal) POR | Abel Silva | 17 | 0 | 12 | 0 | 3 | 0 | 0 | 0 | 2 | 0 |
| 3^{‡} | DF | (Federal Republic of Yugoslavia) YUG | Jovo Simanić | 0 | 0 | 0 | 0 | 0 | 0 | 0 | 0 | 0 | 0 |
| 4 | DF | (Portugal) POR | Nuno Afonso | 1 | 0 | 1 | 0 | 0 | 0 | 0 | 0 | 0 | 0 |
| 4 | DF | (Portugal) POR | Hélder | 43 | 2 | 32 | 2 | 3 | 0 | 6 | 0 | 2 | 0 |
| 4 | DF | (Brazil) BRA | William | 13 | 1 | 8 | 1 | 0 | 0 | 5 | 0 | 0 | 0 |
| 5 | DF | (Brazil) BRA | Carlos Mozer | 41 | 3 | 29 | 3 | 3 | 0 | 7 | 0 | 2 | 0 |
| 5 | MF | (Sweden) SWE | Stefan Schwarz | 31 | 2 | 23 | 1 | 2 | 0 | 6 | 1 | 0 | 0 |
| 6 | MF | (Russia) RUS | Vasili Kulkov | 26 | 4 | 21 | 2 | 2 | 0 | 3 | 2 | 0 | 0 |
| 7 | MF | (Portugal) POR | Vítor Paneira | 45 | 8 | 32 | 6 | 3 | 1 | 8 | 1 | 2 | 0 |
| 8 | MF | (Portugal) POR | João Pinto | 46 | 18 | 34 | 15 | 2 | 1 | 8 | 2 | 2 | 0 |
| 9 | FW | (Portugal) POR | Rui Águas | 34 | 9 | 25 | 6 | 3 | 1 | 4 | 1 | 2 | 1 |
| 9 | FW | (Russia) RUS | Sergei Yuran | 29 | 6 | 20 | 4 | 2 | 1 | 5 | 1 | 2 | 0 |
| 10 | MF | (Portugal) POR | Rui Costa | 47 | 10 | 34 | 5 | 3 | 1 | 8 | 4 | 2 | 0 |
| 11 | MF | (Brazil) BRA | Isaías | 37 | 16 | 26 | 13 | 1 | 1 | 8 | 2 | 2 | 0 |
| 11^{‡} | FW | (Brazil) BRA | Aílton Delfino | 33 | 14 | 28 | 11 | 3 | 3 | 2 | 0 | 0 | 0 |
| 11 | FW | (Portugal) POR | César Brito | 23 | 1 | 15 | 1 | 1 | 0 | 5 | 0 | 2 | 0 |
| 12^{‡} | GK | (Portugal) POR | Paulo Santos | 1 | -1 | 1 | -1 | 0 | 0 | 0 | 0 | 0 | 0 |
| 16 | MF | (Russia) RUS | Aleksandr Mostovoi | 1 | 0 | 0 | 0 | 0 | 0 | 0 | 0 | 1 | 0 |
| 17 | DF | (Portugal) POR | Pedro Henriques | 1 | 0 | 1 | 0 | 0 | 0 | 0 | 0 | 0 | 0 |
| 18 | FW | (Portugal) POR | Hernâni Neves | 5 | 0 | 1 | 0 | 1 | 0 | 2 | 0 | 1 | 0 |
| 22 | DF | (Portugal) POR | Daniel Kenedy | 18 | 0 | 14 | 0 | 2 | 0 | 2 | 0 | 0 | 0 |

== Transfers ==
=== In ===
| Entry date | Position | Player | From club |
|---|---|---|---|
| July 1993 | GK | Paulo Santos | Olivais e Moscavide |
| July 1993 | CB | Jovo Simanić | VfB Stuttgart |
| August 1993 | ST | Aílton Delfino | Atlético Mineiro |

=== Out ===
| Exit date | Position | Player | To club |
|---|---|---|---|
| July 1993 | CB | Samuel Quina | Vitória de Guimarães |
| July 1993 | LW | Paulo Futre | Marseille |
| July 1993 | DM | Paulo Sousa | Sporting CP |
| July 1993 | LW | António Pacheco | Sporting CP |
| July 1993 | RB | José Carlos | Estrela da Amadora |
| July 1993 | LB | Fernando Mendes | Estrela da Amadora |

=== Out by loan ===
| Exit date | Position | Player | To club | Return date |
|---|---|---|---|---|
| July 1993 | GK | Pedro Roma | Gil Vicente | 30 June 1994 |
| July 1993 | CB | Paulo Madeira | Marítimo | 30 June 1994 |
| December 1993 | AM | Aleksandr Mostovoi | Caen | 30 June 1994 |
