= 1992 Supertaça Cândido de Oliveira =

- Event: Supertaça Cândido de Oliveira (Portuguese Super Cup)
Porto	Boavista
3	4

First leg
Porto	Boavista
1	2
- Date: 16 December 1992
- Venue: Estádio das Antas, Porto
- Referee: João Mesquita (Porto)

Second leg
Boavista	Porto
2	2
- Date: 6 January 1993
- Venue: Estádio do Bessa, Porto
- Referee: Miranda de Sousa (Porto)

The 1992 Supertaça Cândido de Oliveira was the 14th edition of the Supertaça Cândido de Oliveira, the annual Portuguese football season-opening match contested by the winners of the previous season's top league and cup competitions (or cup runner-up in case the league- and cup-winning club is the same). The 1992 Supertaça Cândido de Oliveira was contested over two legs, and opposed Boavista and Porto of the Primeira Liga. Porto qualified for the SuperCup by winning the 1991–92 Primeira Divisão, whilst Boavista qualified for the Supertaça by winning the 1991–92 Taça de Portugal.

The first leg which took place at the Estádio das Antas, home of FC Porto, saw Boavista defeat Porto 2–1. The second leg which took place at the Estádio do Bessa, saw a 2–2 draw between both sides, with Boavista recovering from a 0–2 deficit in the last 10 minutes of the game, and thus allowed Boavista to win 4–3 on aggregate over two legs which would give the Panteras their second Supertaça Cândido de Oliveira after their first conquest in 1979, also against Porto, in the first edition of the competition.

== First leg ==
=== Details ===
16 December 1992

Porto	1–2	Boavista
Kostadinov 41'		Brandão 63'; Artur 69'

Estádio das Antas, Porto
Referee: João Mesquita (Porto)

Porto	Boavista

GK	1	(Portugal) Vítor Baía
RB	3	(Portugal) João Pinto (c)
CB	4	(Brazil) Aloísio
CB	5	(Portugal) Fernando Couto
LB	2	(Portugal) Fernando Bandeirinha
DM	6	(Portugal) José Semedo
RM	8	(Portugal) Jaime Magalhães
CM	10	(Portugal) António André	(yellow card) 59'	(substituted off) 73'
LM	7	(Romania) Ion Timofte		(substituted off) 73'
CF	11	(Bulgaria) Emil Kostadinov
CF	9	(Portugal) Domingos
Substitutes:
GK		(Portugal) Vítor Valente
DF		(Portugal) Jorge Costa
MF		(Portugal) Jorge Couto		(substituted on) 73'
MF		(Portugal) Rui Filipe	(yellow card) 77'	(substituted on) 73'
FW		(Brazil) Paulinho McLaren
Manager:
(Brazil) Carlos Alberto Silva

GK	1	(Federal Republic of Yugoslavia) Zoran Lemajić
RB	(Portugal) Paulo Sousa (c)
CB	(Portugal) José Garrido	(substituted off) 56'
CB	(Portugal) Pedro Venâncio
LB	(Portugal) António Caetano	(substituted off) 56'
DM	(Portugal) Rui Bento
CM	(Guinea-Bissau) Bobó	(yellow card) 24'
CM	(Portugal) José Tavares	(yellow card) 38'
CM	(Portugal) Nelo
AM	(Portugal) António Nogueira
CF	(Nigeria) Ricky
Substitutes:
GK	(Portugal) Alfredo
DF	(Mozambique) Jojó
DF	(Portugal) Litos
FW	(Brazil) Artur	(substituted on) 56'
FW	(Brazil) Marlon Brandão	(substituted on) 56'
Manager:
(Portugal) Manuel José

Match officials

- Assistant referees:
- Fourth official:

Match rules

- 90 minutes.
- Maximum of two substitutions

== Second leg ==
=== Details ===
6 January 1993

Boavista	2–2	Porto
Tavares 79'; Brandão 81'		Kostadinov 8', 54'

Estádio do Bessa, Porto
Referee: Miranda de Sousa (Porto)

Boavista	Porto

GK	1	(Federal Republic of Yugoslavia) Zoran Lemajić
RM	(Portugal) Paulo Sousa (c)
CB	(Portugal) Pedro Venâncio	(yellow card) 55'
SW	(Portugal) Rui Bento	(yellow card) 84'
CB	(Portugal) José Garrido	(yellow card) 22'	(substituted off) 26'
CM	(Guinea-Bissau) Bobó
CM	(Portugal) José Tavares
LM	(Portugal) Nelo	(yellow card) 63'
CM	(Portugal) António Nogueira	(substituted off) 61'
FW	(Portugal) Bambo
FW	(Nigeria) Ricky
Substitutes:
GK	(Portugal) Alfredo
DF	(Portugal) António Caetano
MF	(Portugal) Rui Casaca
FW	(Brazil) Marlon Brandão	(substituted on) 26'
FW	(Brazil) Nelson Bertollazzi	(substituted on) 61'
Manager:
(Portugal) Manuel José

GK	1	(Portugal) Vítor Baía
RB	3	(Portugal) João Pinto (c)	(yellow card) 58'
CB	4	(Brazil) Aloísio
CB	5	(Portugal) Fernando Couto
LB	2	(Portugal) Fernando Bandeirinha
DM	10	(Portugal) Paulinho Santos	(yellow card) 48'
RM	8	(Portugal) Jaime Magalhães
CM	6	(Portugal) António André
LM	7	(Romania) Ion Timofte		(substituted off) 67'
CF	9	(Portugal) Toni
CF	11	(Bulgaria) Emil Kostadinov		(substituted off) 74'
Substitutes:
GK		(Portugal) Vítor Valente
DF		(Brazil) Zé Carlos
MF		(Portugal) José Semedo		(substituted on) 67'
FW		(Portugal) Domingos		(substituted on) 74'
FW		(Brazil) Paulinho McLaren
Manager:
(Brazil) Carlos Alberto Silva

Match officials

- Assistant referees:
- Fourth official:

Match rules

- 90 minutes.
- 30 minutes of extra time if necessary.
- Penalty shoot-out if scores still level.
- Maximum of two substitutions

1992 Supertaça Cândido de Oliveira Winners
Boavista
2nd Title
