= 1993 Supertaça Cândido de Oliveira =

- Event: Supertaça Cândido de Oliveira (Portuguese Super Cup)
Benfica	Porto
2	2
- Porto won the replay 4–3 on penalties, after 1–1 aggregate score over the two legs.

First leg
Benfica	Porto
1	0
- Date: 11 August 1993
- Venue: Estádio da Luz, Lisbon
- Referee: Carlos Valente (Setúbal)

Second leg
Porto	Benfica
1	0
- Date: 15 August 1993
- Venue: Estádio das Antas, Porto
- Referee: Fortunato Azevedo (Braga)

The 1993 Supertaça Cândido de Oliveira was the 15th edition of the Supertaça Cândido de Oliveira, the annual Portuguese football season-opening match contested by the winners of the previous season's top league and cup competitions (or cup runner-up in case the league- and cup-winning club is the same). The 1993 Supertaça Cândido de Oliveira was contested over two legs, and opposed Benfica and Porto of the Primeira Liga. Porto qualified for the SuperCup by winning the 1992–93 Primeira Divisão, whilst Benfica qualified for the Supertaça by winning the 1992–93 Taça de Portugal.

The first leg which took place at the Estádio da Luz, saw Benfica defeat Porto 1–0 as a result of a late Rui Águas goal. The second leg which took place at the Estádio das Antas saw Porto defeat Benfica 1–0 (1–1 on aggregate), which led to the Supertaça being replayed in August 1994. The replay which took place at Estádio Municipal de Coimbra, saw the Dragões defeat the Encarnados 4–3 on penalties which would claim the Portistas a seventh Supertaça.

== First leg ==
=== Details ===
11 August 1993

Benfica	1–0	Porto
Rui Águas 84'

Estádio da Luz, Lisbon
Referee: Carlos Valente (Setúbal)

Benfica	Porto

GK	1	(Portugal) Neno
RB	5	(Portugal) Abel Silva		(substituted off) 79'
CB	3	(Portugal) Hélder
CB	4	(Brazil) Carlos Mozer
LB	2	(Portugal) António Veloso (c)
RM	7	(Portugal) Vítor Paneira
CM	10	(Portugal) Rui Costa
CM	8	(Portugal) João Pinto
LM	11	(Brazil) Isaías	(yellow card) 65'
CF	9	(Portugal) Rui Águas		(substituted off) 89'
CF	6	(Russia) Sergei Yuran
Substitutes:
MF		(Russia) Aleksandr Mostovoi		(substituted on) 89'
FW		(Portugal) César Brito		(substituted on) 79'
Manager:
(Portugal) Toni

GK	1	(Portugal) Vítor Baía
RB	2	(Portugal) João Pinto (c)
CB	4	(Brazil) Aloísio
CB	6	(Portugal) Fernando Couto	(yellow card) 90'
CB	3	(Brazil) Zé Carlos
LB	5	(Portugal) Rui Jorge	(yellow card) 49'
DM	10	(Portugal) António André
RM	8	(Portugal) Jaime Magalhães		(substituted off) 60'
CM	7	(Portugal) José Semedo
LM	11	(Portugal) Jorge Couto
CF	9	(Bulgaria) Emil Kostadinov
Substitutes:
MF		(Portugal) Paulinho Santos		(substituted on) 60'
Manager:
(Croatia) Tomislav Ivić

Match officials

- Assistant referees:
- Fourth official:

Match rules

- 90 minutes.
- Maximum of two substitutions

== Second leg ==
=== Details ===
15 August 1993

Porto	1–0	Benfica
Vinha 84'

Estádio das Antas, Porto
Referee: Fortunato Azevedo (Braga)

Porto	Benfica

GK	1	(Portugal) Vítor Baía
RB	2	(Portugal) João Pinto (c)	(yellow card) 76'
CB	4	(Brazil) Aloísio	(yellow card) 11'
CB	5	(Portugal) Fernando Couto
LB	3	(Brazil) Paulo Pereira
CM	6	(Portugal) António André
CM	8	(Portugal) José Semedo
AM	7	(Romania) Ion Timofte		(substituted off) 54'
RW	9	(Bulgaria) Emil Kostadinov
LW	11	(Portugal) António Folha	(yellow card) 90'
CF	10	(Portugal) Toni		(substituted off) 54'
Substitutes:
MF		(Portugal) Jaime Magalhães		(substituted on) 54'
FW		(Cape Verde) Vinha		(substituted on) 54'
Manager:
(Croatia) Tomislav Ivić

GK	1	(Portugal) Neno
RB	5	(Portugal) Abel Silva
CB	3	(Portugal) Hélder
CB	4	(Brazil) Carlos Mozer	(yellow card) 42' (yellow-red card) 50'
LB	2	(Portugal) António Veloso (c)
RM	7	(Portugal) Vítor Paneira	(yellow card) 34'	(substituted off) 45'
CM	10	(Portugal) Rui Costa
CM	8	(Portugal) João Pinto
LM	11	(Brazil) Isaías
CF	9	(Portugal) Rui Águas	(yellow card) 5'
CF	6	(Russia) Sergei Yuran		(substituted off) 84'
Substitutes:
MF	14	(Portugal) Hernâni		(substituted on) 45'
FW	15	(Portugal) César Brito		(substituted on) 84'
Manager:
(Portugal) Toni

Match officials

- Assistant referees:
- Fourth official:

Match rules

- 90 minutes.
- Maximum of two substitutions

== Replay ==
=== Details ===
17 August 1994

Benfica	2–2 (a.e.t.)	Porto
Tavares 89'; Brito 118'		Domingos 85'; Secretário 95'
Penalties
Hélder (penalty scored); Daniel Kenedy (penalty missed); Abel Xavier (penalty scored); Paulo Madeira (penalty scored); William (penalty missed)	3–4	(penalty missed) João Domingos Pinto; (penalty scored) Zé Carlos; (penalty scored) Rui Filipe; (penalty scored) Paulinho Santos; (penalty scored) Drulović

Estádio Municipal de Coimbra, Coimbra
Referee: Veiga Trigo (Beja)

Benfica	Porto

GK	1	(Belgium) Michel Preud'homme
RB	3	(Portugal) Paulo Madeira
CB	4	(Portugal) Hélder	(yellow card) 80'
CB	2	(Brazil) William
LB	5	(Portugal) Dimas	(yellow card) 40'
DM	6	(Portugal) Abel Xavier
RM	7	(Portugal) Vítor Paneira (c)		(substituted off) 86'
CM	6	(Portugal) Nelo	(yellow card) 20'	(substituted off) 69'
CM	9	(Portugal) José Tavares
LM	8	(Portugal) João Pinto	(yellow card) 60'
CF	11	(Brazil) Isaías
Substitutes:
DF		(Portugal) Daniel Kenedy		(substituted on) 69'
FW	16	(Portugal) César Brito		(substituted on) 86'
Manager:
(Portugal) Artur Jorge

GK	1	(Portugal) Vítor Baía
RB	2	(Portugal) João Pinto (c)	(yellow card) 30'
CB	4	(Brazil) Aloísio	(yellow card) 70' (yellow-red card) 99'
CB	5	(Brazil) Zé Carlos	(yellow card) 120'
LB	7	(Portugal) Carlos Secretário
DM	3	(Portugal) Paulinho Santos
CM	8	(Brazil) Emerson
CM	6	(Portugal) Rui Filipe
AM	10	(Portugal) Rui Barros	(yellow card) 99' (yellow-red card) 101'
SS	11	(Portugal) António Folha		(substituted off) 87'
CF	9	(Portugal) Domingos	(yellow card) 29'	(substituted off) 86'
Substitutes:
FW	15	(Federal Republic of Yugoslavia) Ljubinko Drulović		(substituted on) 87'
FW	16	(Bulgaria) Emil Kostadinov		(substituted on) 86'
Manager:
(England) Bobby Robson

Match officials

- Assistant referees:
- Fourth official:

Match rules

- 90 minutes.
- 30 minutes of extra time if necessary.
- Penalty shoot-out if scores still level.
- Maximum of two substitutions

1993 Supertaça Cândido de Oliveira Winners
Porto
7th Title

== See also ==
- O Clássico
- 1993–94 Primeira Divisão
- 1993–94 Taça de Portugal
- 1993–94 S.L. Benfica season
