= 1992–93 Taça de Portugal =

Tournament details
- Country: Portugal
- Dates: September 1992 – 10 June 1993

Final positions
- Champions: Benfica (22nd title)
- Runners-up: Boavista

Tournament statistics
- Top goal scorer(s): Jorge Cadete; Krasimir Balakov (4 goals)

The 1992–93 Taça de Portugal was the 54th edition of the Taça de Portugal, a Portuguese football knockout tournament organized by the Portuguese Football Federation (FPF). The 1992–93 Taça de Portugal began in September 1992. The final was played on 10 June 1993 at the Estádio Nacional.

Boavista were the previous holders, having defeated Porto 2–1 in the previous season's final. Benfica defeated cup holders Boavista, 5–2 in the final. As a result of Benfica winning the domestic cup competition, the Encarnados faced 1992–93 Primeira Divisão winners Porto in the 1993 Supertaça Cândido de Oliveira.

== Fourth round ==
All fourth round cup ties were played on the 29 November.

Home team	Score	Away team
Académica de Coimbra (II)	3–2	Tirsense (I)
Alverca (III)	4–1	Beira-Mar (I)
Amora (II)	1–0	União de Tomar (III)
Atlético CP (III)	2–0	Lusitano de Évora (III)
Barreirense (III)	0–1	Sporting CP (I)
Braga (I)	2–0	Ermesinde (III)
Belenenses (I)	2–0	Moura (IV)
Boavista (I)	3–2	Famalicão (I)
Campomaiorense (II)	2–0	União Santiago (III)
Chaves (I)	1–0	Feirense (II)
Esperança de Lagos (III)	1–0	Olivais e Moscavide (III)
Estrela da Amadora (II)	4–0	O Elvas (III)
Farense (I)	1–0	Marítimo (I)
Fátima (III)	3–0	Amarante (IV)

Home team	Score	Away team
Infesta (III)	6–0	Nacional (II)
Juventude de Évora III)	1–0	Gil Vicente (I)
Louletano (II)	0–1	Benfica (I)
Lousanense (III)	2–1	Marialvas (IV)
Odivelas (IV)	1–0	Sertanense (IV)
Paços de Ferreira (I)	6–1	Benfica Castelo Branco (II)
Penafiel (II)	3–1	Sporting de Espinho (I)
Rio Ave (II)	3–2	Estoril (I)
Salgueiros (I)	3–0	Leixões (II)
Trofense (III)	1–0	Fafe (III)
União da Madeira (II)	3–2	Caldas (III)
União de Leiria (II)	2–1	Oliveirense (III)
Vitória de Setúbal II)	5–0	Vasco da Gama AC (III)
Vitória de Guimarães (I)	2–1	Vizela (III)

== Fifth round ==
Ties were played on the 27 December.

27 December 1992	Alverca (III)	1–0	Atlético CP (III)	Complexo Desportivo FC Alverca, Alverca do Ribatejo

27 December 1992	Amora (II)	0–0 (a.e.t.)	Chaves (I)	Estádio da Medideira, Amora

27 December 1992	Belenenses (I)	2–0	Lousanense (III)	Estádio do Restelo, Lisbon

27 December 1992	Estrela da Amadora (II)	2–0	Farense (I)	Estádio José Gomes, Amadora

27 December 1992	Fátima (III)	3–2	Trofense (III)	Estádio Municipal de Fátima, Fátima

27 December 1992	Infesta (III)	0–2	Boavista (I)	Parque de Jogos Manuel Ramos, São Mamede de Infesta
16:00				Referee: Martins dos Santos

27 December 1992	Odivelas (IV)	1–0	Salgueiros (I)	Estádio Arnaldo Dias, Odivelas

27 December 1992	Paços de Ferreira (I)	2–1	União da Madeira (II)	Estádio da Mata Real, Paços de Ferreira

27 December 1992	Penafiel (II)	2–1	Esperança de Lagos (III)	Estádio Municipal 25 de Abril, Penafiel

27 December 1992	Porto (I)	4–0	Juventude de Évora (III)	Estádio das Antas, Porto
	Toni 39', 72'; Rui Filipe 68'; Timofte 82'

27 December 1992	Rio Ave (II)	1–3	Benfica (I)	Estádio da Luz, Lisbon
16:00	Augusto Gama 79'		Kulkov 12'; Hélder 40'; Paneira 76'

27 December 1992	Sporting CP (I)	2–0	Académica de Coimbra (II)	Estádio José Alvalade, Lisbon
	Balakov 30', pen.' Yordanov 41'

27 December 1992	Vitória de Guimarães (I)	2–1	Campomaiorense (II)	Estádio D. Afonso Henriques, Guimarães

27 December 1992	Vitória de Setúbal (II)	1–0	União de Leiria (I)	Estádio do Bonfim, Setúbal

Replay	Chaves (I)	1–2	Amora (II)	Estádio Municipal de Chaves, Chaves
				Referee: José Pratas

== Sixth round ==
Ties were played in January. Due to the odd number of teams involved at this stage of the competition, Amora qualified for the quarter-finals due to having no opponent to face at this stage of the competition.

January 1993	Alverca (III)	2–1	Odivelas (IV)	Complexo Desportivo FC Alverca, Alverca do Ribatejo

January 1993	Boavista (I)	1–0	Vitória de Setúbal (II)	Estádio do Bessa, Porto

January 1993	Braga (I)	1–1 (a.e.t.)	Penafiel (II)	Estádio Primeiro de Maio, Braga

January 1993	Estrela da Amadora (II)	1–0	Paços de Ferreira (I)	Estádio José Gomes, Amadora

January 1993	Vitória de Guimarães (I)	1–0	Belenenses (I)	Estádio D. Afonso Henriques, Guimarães

16 January 1993	Sporting CP (I)	3–2	Fátima (III)	Estádio José Alvalade, Lisbon
	Balakov 6'; Cadete 7', 36'		Palecas 3'

17 January 1993	Porto (I)	1–1 (a.e.t.)	Benfica (I)	Estádio das Antas, Porto
	Timofte 72'		Mostovoi 88'	Referee: José Pratas

January 1993 Replay	Penafiel (II)	1–2	Braga (I)	Estádio Municipal 25 de Abril, Penafiel

27 January 1993 Replay	Benfica (I)	2–0	Porto (I)	Estádio da Luz, Lisbon
	Isaías 58'; Yuran 85', pen.'			Referee: Carlos Valente

== Quarter-finals ==
Ties were played on the 3 February.

3 February 1993	Alverca (III)	0–3	Sporting CP (I)	Estádio José Alvalade, Lisbon
			Cadete 21'; Balakov 45', 79'

3 February 1993	Benfica (I)	5–0	Amora (II)	Estádio da Luz, Lisbon
	Mostovoi 43'; Pacheco 69'; Yuran 75', 80'; Paulo Sousa 81'

3 February 1993	Boavista (I)	1–0	Braga (I)	Estádio do Bessa, Porto

3 February 1993	Vitória de Guimarães (I)	2–1	Estrela da Amadora (II)	Estádio D. Afonso Henriques, Guimarães

== Semi-finals ==
Ties were played between the 14 April and 6 May.

14 April 1993	Sporting CP (I)	0–1 (a.e.t.)	Boavista (I)	Estádio José Alvalade, Lisbon
			Brandão 110'

6 May 1993	Vitória de Guimarães (I)	1–2	Benfica (I)	Estádio D. Afonso Henriques, Guimarães
	Tlemçani 2'		Isaías 78'; Rui Águas 89'

== Final ==
10 June 1993
17:00 CEST

Benfica	5–2	Boavista
Paneira 32'; João Pinto 35'; Futre 48', 70'; Águas 88'		Brandão 44'; Tavares 57'

Estádio Nacional, Oeiras
Referee: Veiga Trigo (Beja)
