= 1991 Taça de Portugal final =

- Event: 1990–91 Taça de Portugal
Beira-Mar	Porto
1	3
- Date: 2 June 1991
- Venue: Estádio Nacional, Oeiras
- Referee: Vitor Correia (Lisbon)

The 1991 Taça de Portugal final was the final match of the 1990–91 Taça de Portugal, the 51st season of the Taça de Portugal, the premier Portuguese football cup competition organized by the Portuguese Football Federation (FPF). The match was played on 2 June 1991 at the Estádio Nacional in Oeiras, and opposed two Primeira Liga sides: Beira-Mar and Porto. Porto defeated Beira-Mar 3–1 in a game that went to extra-time, which would give Porto their seventh Taça de Portugal.

In Portugal, the final was televised live on RTP. As a result of Porto winning the Taça de Portugal, the Dragões qualified for the 1991 Supertaça Cândido de Oliveira where they took on 1990–91 Primeira Divisão winners Benfica.

== Match ==
=== Details ===
2 June 1991
17:00 WEST

Beira-Mar	1–3 (a.e.t.)	Porto
Abdelghani 30'		Domingos 5'; Kostadinov 96'; Magalhães 100'

Estádio Nacional, Oeiras
Referee: Vitor Correia (Santarém)

Beira-Mar	Porto

GK	1	(Portugal) Hélder Catalão
DF		(Portugal) João Redondo (c)
DF		(Portugal) António Oliveira
DF		(Bulgaria) Petar Petrov
MF		(Brazil) China
MF		(Portugal) Mito	(substituted off) 77'
MF		(Portugal) António Sousa	(substituted off) 100'
MF	10	(Egypt) Magdi Abdelghani
MF		(Portugal) José Ribeiro
FW		(Portugal) Jorge Silvério
FW	11	(Brazil) Dino Furacão
Substitutes:
FW		(Portugal) Manuel Penteado	(substituted on) 100'
FW		(Brazil) Jarbas Aguiar	(substituted on) 77'
Manager:
(Portugal) Vítor Urbano

GK	1	(Portugal) Vítor Baía
DF		(Czech Republic) Lubomír Vlk	(substituted off) 90'
DF	5	(Portugal) Fernando Couto
DF	4	(Brazil) Paulo Pereira
DF	2	(Portugal) João Pinto (c)
DF	3	(Brazil) Aloísio
MF		(Portugal) José Semedo
MF		(Portugal) António André
MF		(Portugal) Jaime Magalhães
MF		(Portugal) Jorge Couto	(substituted off) 73'
FW	9	(Portugal) Domingos
Substitutes:
MF		(Portugal) Abílio	(substituted on) 90'
FW	16	(Bulgaria) Emil Kostadinov	(substituted on) 73'
Manager:
(Portugal) Artur Jorge

1990–91 Taça de Portugal Winners
Porto
7th Title

Match officials

- Assistant referees:
- Fourth official:

Match rules

- 90 minutes.
- 30 minutes of extra time if necessary.
- Maximum of two substitutions
