= Alfredo Castro =

Alfredo Castro may refer to:

- Alfredo Castro (footballer), Portuguese footballer
- Alfredo Castro (actor), Chilean actor
