= Pedro Venâncio =

Portuguese footballer

Personal information
- Full name: Pedro Manuel Regateiro Venâncio
- Date of birth: 21 November 1963 (age 62)
- Place of birth: Setúbal, Portugal
- Height: 1.86 m (6 ft 1 in)
- Position: Centre-back

Youth career
- 1978–1981: Vitória Setúbal
- 1981–1982: Sporting CP

Senior career*
Years	Team	Apps	(Gls)
1982–1992	Sporting CP	209	(9)
1992–1994	Boavista	24	(0)
Total		233	(9)

International career
1985–1991	Portugal	21	(0)
- * Club domestic league appearances and goals

Pedro Manuel Regateiro Venâncio (born 21 November 1963) is a Portuguese former professional footballer who played as a central defender.

== Club career ==
During his career, Setúbal-born Venâncio represented two clubs in the Primeira Liga, Sporting CP and Boavista FC, making more than 250 official appearances for the former albeit without no silverware won in a ten-year spell. He retired at only 30, in a career downed by constant injuries.

During his stint at Sporting, Venâncio formed a pair of youth graduate stoppers with António Morato.

== International career ==
Venâncio won 21 caps for Portugal in six years. He was selected for the 1986 FIFA World Cup, but had to quit before the tournament in Mexico started due to an injury.

== Personal life ==
Venâncio's son, Frederico, was also a footballer and a central defender. He too was brought up at Vitória.

== Honours ==
Boavista

- Supertaça Cândido de Oliveira: 1992
