= Rui Bento =

Portuguese footballer and manager

Personal information
- Full name: Rui Fernando da Silva Calapez Pereira Bento
- Date of birth: 14 January 1972 (age 54)
- Place of birth: Silves, Portugal
- Height: 1.76 m (5 ft 9 in)
- Positions: Centre-back; defensive midfielder

Youth career
- 1983–1987: Silves
- 1987–1991: Benfica

Senior career*
Years	Team	Apps	(Gls)
1991–1992	Benfica	24	(0)
1992–2001	Boavista	242	(4)
2001–2004	Sporting CP	55	(1)
Total		321	(5)

International career
1990–1991	Portugal U20	12	(0)
1991–1993	Portugal U21	17	(0)
1996	Portugal Olympic (O.P.)	6	(0)
1991–2001	Portugal	6	(0)

Managerial career
- 2004–2005: Académico Viseu
- 2005: Barreirense
- 2006–2007: Penafiel
- 2008–2009: Boavista
- 2009–2011: Portugal U17
- 2011–2012: Beira-Mar
- 2014: Bangkok United
- 2015: Tondela
- 2016–2017: Portugal U17
- 2017–2018: Portugal U18
- 2018–2019: Portugal U19
- 2020–2021: Portugal U20
- 2021–2022: Portugal U17
- 2022–2024: Kuwait
Medal record
Men's football
Representing Portugal
FIFA U-20 World Cup
Winner	1991 Portugal
UEFA European Under-21 Championship
Runner-up	1994 France
UEFA European Under-17 Championship
Runner-up	1988 Spain
- * Club domestic league appearances and goals

Rui Fernando da Silva Calapez Pereira Bento (born 14 January 1972) is a Portuguese former footballer who played mostly as a central defender, currently a manager.

Over 13 seasons, he amassed Primeira Liga totals of 321 matches and five goals, representing mainly Boavista (nine years). He managed S.C. Beira-Mar and Tondela in the top flight, and spent several years coaching Portugal's youth teams.

== Club career ==
Born in Silves, Algarve, Bento first represented S.L. Benfica, but would gain national recognition with Boavista FC. Already relocated as a defensive midfielder, he helped them to their only Primeira Liga championship in the 2000–01 season, adding the 1997 Taça de Portugal.

After three years at Sporting CP, battling with namesake Paulo Bento for first-choice status and winning another league title in 2002, Bento retired from playing at the age of 32, and started coaching at lowly Académico de Viseu FC. In summer 2008 he returned to Boavista with the club now in the second division, and the side eventually suffered a second consecutive relegation.

Bento was appointed at S.C. Beira-Mar midway through the 2010–11 after taking the place of Leonardo Jardim, only winning twice in nine top-division games until the end of the campaign (two draws and five losses) but still leading the Aveiro team away from the relegation zone. He resigned on 26 February 2012.

After some time managing the under-23 side of Al Ahli Saudi FC, Bento signed as manager of Bangkok United F.C. in January 2014. He left early on in the Thai Premier League season.

On 6 October 2015, Bento returned to Portugal's top flight, succeeding Vítor Paneira at 16th-placed C.D. Tondela on a deal to the end of the campaign. He left by mutual accord on 8 December after earning a solitary point from five matches, placing the club in last position.

== International career ==
Bento was capped six times for Portugal. His first game took place at 20 November 1991 in a 1–0 win over Greece for the UEFA Euro 1992 qualifiers, and his last was a 4–0 defeat to France on 25 April 2001, in a friendly.

Bento also played Olympic football, helping the national side to finish fourth at the 1996 Summer Olympics in Atlanta. Previously, he was a starter for the 1991 FIFA World Youth Championship winners, in a competition played on home soil.

In July 2009, Bento was named the Portugal under-17 manager. He and Emílio Peixe left the Portuguese Football Federation set-up in August 2022, to take the helm at Kuwait's senior and Olympic teams, respectively.

== Honours ==
Benfica

- Supertaça Cândido de Oliveira runner-up: 1991

Boavista

- Primeira Liga: 2000–01
- Taça de Portugal: 1996–97
- Supertaça Cândido de Oliveira: 1992, 1997

Sporting CP

- Primeira Liga: 2001–02
- Taça de Portugal: 2001–02

Portugal U-20

- FIFA U-20 World Cup: 1991
