= Sergei Yuran =

Russian footballer (born 1969)

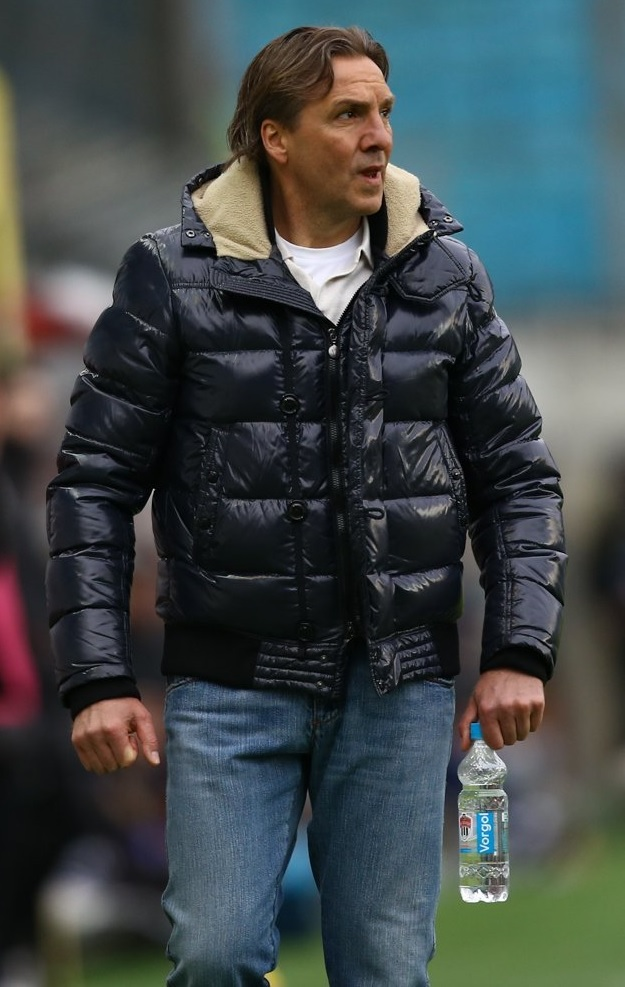
- Yuran as coach of Khimki in 2022

Personal information
- Full name: Sergei Nikolayevich Yuran
- Date of birth: 11 June 1969 (age 57)
- Place of birth: Luhansk, Ukrainian SSR, Soviet Union
- Height: 1.84 m (6 ft 0 in)
- Position: Forward

Team information
- Current team: Ural Yekaterinburg (manager)

Senior career*
Years	Team	Apps	(Gls)
1985–1987	Zorya Voroshilovgrad	55	(10)
1988–1991	Dynamo Kyiv	31	(15)
1991–1994	Benfica	63	(19)
1994–1995	Porto	23	(4)
1995	Spartak Moscow	8	(2)
1996	Millwall	13	(1)
1996–1997	Fortuna Düsseldorf	16	(5)
1997–1998	Bochum	28	(7)
1999	Spartak Moscow	18	(3)
1999–2001	Sturm Graz	26	(6)
Total		276	(69)

International career
1990–1991	USSR	12	(2)
1992	CIS	3	(0)
1992–1999	Russia	25	(5)

Managerial career
- 2003: Spartak Moscow (reserves)
- 2003: Spartak Moscow (assistant)
- 2004: Dynamo Stavropol
- 2006: FC Ditton
- 2006: FC TVMK
- 2007–2008: Shinnik
- 2008: Khimki
- 2009: Lokomotiv Astana (caretaker)
- 2010: Lokomotiv Astana (assistant)
- 2011: Simurq
- 2012–2013: Sibir Novosibirsk
- 2014–2015: Baltika
- 2016: Mika
- 2017–2020: Zorky Krasnogorsk
- 2020: Khimki
- 2020–2022: SKA-Khabarovsk
- 2022: Khimki
- 2023–2024: Pari NN
- 2025: Serikspor
- 2026: SKA-Khabarovsk
- 2026–: Ural Yekaterinburg
- * Club domestic league appearances and goals

Sergei Nikolayevich Yuran (Russian: Сергей Николаевич Юран, Ukrainian: Сергій Миколайович Юран Serhij Mykolajovyč Juran; born 11 June 1969) is a professional football manager and a former player who played as a forward. He is the manager of Ural Yekaterinburg. Born in Ukraine, he represented the USSR and Russia at international level.

== Club career ==
At club level he played in six countries. After his playing career abruptly ended in 2001 following a skull injury, he became a manager.

== International career ==
He was capped by the USSR (and later the CIS), and despite being born in Ukraine and having been honored as the best Ukrainian footballer, chose to represent Russia after the breakup of the USSR. He was part of the CIS squad at the UEFA Euro 1992, appearing in two matches, and part of the Russia squad at the 1994 FIFA World Cup, making one appearance.

In 2009, he was part of the Russia squad that won the 2009 Legends Cup, a friendly tournament for retired players.

== Coaching career ==
His first experience in coaching was as assistant manager under Andrey Chernyshov in Spartak Moscow, 2003. After three months, Chernyshov and his assistants were fired from Spartak. In 2004 Yuran managed Dynamo Stavropol. After a brief spell with Latvian side FC Ditton from January to May 2006, Yuran was appointed as manager of Estonian champions FC TVMK in July 2006, but in December he unexpectedly left the team. Soon, he took charge at the First Division side Shinnik Yaroslavl, aiming to win promotion to the Russian Premier League. Since summer of 2008 Yuran was head coach of Khimki, he was fired on 2 December 2008, despite the fact that the club managed to stay in the Russian Premier League.

On 29 December 2014, he became manager of Russian Football National League club FC Baltika Kaliningrad.

On 27 January 2020, Yuran was hired once again by Khimki, now in the Russian Football National League. The club only played 2 games after the resumption of the 2019–20 season after the winter break and then the season was abandoned due to the COVID-19 pandemic in Russia. As Khimki were 2nd in the league at the time of abandonment, the club was promoted to the Russian Premier League. He led Khimki to the 2019–20 Russian Cup final, where the club lost to FC Zenit Saint Petersburg. On 1 August 2020, he was fired by Khimki.

On 21 October 2020, he was hired by FNL club SKA-Khabarovsk.

On 23 February 2022, Yuran was hired by Khimki for his third spell at the club, with the team in last place in the Russian Premier League standings at the time. Under his management, Khimki avoided relegation through the playoffs. After just 4 games in the 2022–23 season, with the club in 7th place, Yuran left Khimki by mutual consent.

On 4 April 2023, Yuran was hired by Russian Premier League club Pari NN. Pari remained in the Premier League after beating Rodina Moscow in the relegation play-offs. Yuran left Pari NN on 28 April 2024, following six consecutive league losses.

== Personal life ==
Yuran was married to a daughter of the Ukrainian coach Oleksandr Chubarov. Sergei has a son Artyom Yuran who is a professional footballer.

== Playing statistics ==
Appearances and goals by club, season and competition
Club	Season	League			National cup (Note: Includes Taça de Portugal, Russian Cup, FA Cup, DFB-Pokal, Austrian Cup.)		League cup (Note: Includes Taça da Liga, Russian Premier League Cup, League Cup.)		Continental		Total	
Club	Season	Division	Apps	Goals	Apps	Goals	Apps	Goals	Apps	Goals	Apps	Goals
Zorya Voroshilovgrad	1985	Soviet Second League	1	0								
Zorya Voroshilovgrad	1986	Soviet Second League	19	4								
Zorya Voroshilovgrad	1987	Soviet First League	35	6								
Zorya Voroshilovgrad	Total		55	10								
Dynamo Kyiv	1988	Soviet Top League	0	0								
Dynamo Kyiv	1989	Soviet Top League	0	0								
Dynamo Kyiv	1990	Soviet Top League	13	9								
Dynamo Kyiv	1991	Soviet Top League	18	6								
Dynamo Kyiv	Total		31	15								
Benfica	1991–92	Primeira Divisão	21	7								
Benfica	1992–93	Primeira Divisão	22	8								
Benfica	1993–94	Primeira Divisão	20	4								
Benfica	Total		63	19								
Porto	1994–95	Primeira Divisão	23	4								
Spartak Moscow	1995	Russian Top League	8	2								
Millwall	1995–96	First Division	13	1								
Fortuna Düsseldorf	1996–97	Bundesliga	16	5	1	0	–		–		17	5
VfL Bochum	1997–98	Bundesliga	23	4	1	0	0	0	4	3	28	7
Spartak Moscow	1999	Russian Top Division	18	3								
Sturm Graz	1999–2000	Bundesliga	11	3								
Sturm Graz	2000–01	Bundesliga	15	3								
Sturm Graz	Total		26	6								
Career total			276	69								

== Honours ==
Dynamo Kyiv

- Soviet Top League: 1990
- USSR Cup: 1990

Benfica

- Primeira Divisão: 1993–94
- Taça de Portugal: 1992–93

Porto

- Primeira Divisão: 1994–95

Spartak Moscow

- Russian Premier League: 1999

Individual

- Ukrainian Footballer of the Year: 1990
- European Cup top Scorer: 1991–92 (shared with Jean-Pierre Papin)
