= 1991–92 Taça de Portugal =

Tournament details
- Country: Portugal
- Dates: September 1991 – 24 May 1992

Final positions
- Champions: Boavista (4th title)
- Runners-up: Porto

The 1991–92 Taça de Portugal was the 53rd edition of the Portuguese football knockout tournament, organized by the Portuguese Football Federation (FPF). The 1991–92 Taça de Portugal began in September 1991. The final was played on 24 May 1992 at the Estádio Nacional.

Porto were the previous holders, having defeated Beira-Mar 3–1 in the previous season's final. Boavista defeated cup holders Porto, 2–1 in the final. As a result of Boavista winning the domestic cup competition, the Panteras faced 1991–92 Primeira Divisão winners Porto in the 1992 Supertaça Cândido de Oliveira.

== Semi-finals ==
Ties were played between the 22 April and 7 May.

22 April 1992	Benfica (I)	1–2	Boavista (I)	Estádio da Luz, Lisbon
	Pacheco 78'			Referee: Mário Leal

7 May 1992	Leixões (II)	0–2	Porto (I)	Estádio do Mar, Matosinhos
			Zé Carlos 39'; Domingos 85'	Referee: José Pratas

== Final ==
24 May 1992
17:00 WEST

Boavista	2–1	Porto
Brandão 33'; Ricky 55'		Magalhães 52'

Estádio Nacional, Oeiras
Referee: Veiga Trigo (Beja)
