= Vinha =

Cape Verdean footballer (born 1966)

Personal information
- Full name: Alves Nilo Marcos Lima Fortes
- Date of birth: 6 November 1966 (age 59)
- Place of birth: Praia, Cape Verde
- Height: 1.93 m (6 ft 4 in)
- Position: Forward

Senior career*
Years	Team	Apps	(Gls)
1987–1988	Castilla Luanda		
1988–1990	Atlético	33	(10)
1990–1993	Salgueiros	65	(10)
1993–1994	Porto	16	(4)
1994–1998	Salgueiros	101	(9)
1998	Paços Ferreira	8	(0)
1999	Lousada		
1999	Imortal	13	(1)
2000–2001	Tirsense		
- * Club domestic league appearances and goals

Alves Nilo Marcos Lima Fortes (born 6 November 1966), commonly known as Vinha, is a Cape Verdean former professional footballer who played as a forward.

== Career ==
Born in Praia, Vinha arrived in Portugal aged 21, starting out at Atlético Clube de Portugal. After two seasons, he moved to the Primeira Liga with S.C. Salgueiros, being an important attacking unit in the Porto side's domestic consolidation.

Vinha's solid performances attracted attention from local FC Porto, and soon after a callup – which did not materialise – to the Portugal national team. During his sole season he featured little, but still managed to contribute four league goals as the club finished second to S.L. Benfica and won the Taça de Portugal; previously, in the Supertaça Cândido de Oliveira that started the new campaign, he netted against the same rival in an eventual aggregate victory (he also scored against Benfica in the league opener through a trademark header).

In summer 1994, Vinha returned to Salgueiros for a further four seasons, always in the top division. After failing to score in his last year, from 20 games, he moved to the lower leagues following a brief spell in the Segunda Liga with F.C. Paços de Ferreira, retiring in 2001 at F.C. Tirsense.

== Post-retirement ==
Vinha faded into obscurity upon retiring, also working as a stand employee at Exponor, a cultural exposition and forum center in Leça da Palmeira.
