= Hélder Catalão =

Portuguese footballer

Personal information
- Full name: Hélder Joaquim Máximo Catalão
- Date of birth: 1 January 1955 (age 71)
- Place of birth: Tramagal, Portugal
- Position: Goalkeeper

Senior career*
Years	Team	Apps	(Gls)
1974–1979	Académica de Coimbra	75	(0)
1979–1982	Académico de Viseu	73	(0)
1982–1990	Braga	142	(0)
1990–1992	Beira-Mar	61	(0)
1992–1993	Nacional		
1993–1996	Amares		
1996–1997	Monfortense		
- * Club domestic league appearances and goals

Hélder Joaquim Máximo Catalão (born 1 May 1955), known as Hélder, is a Portuguese former footballer who played as a goalkeeper. He played 17 seasons and 335 games in the Primeira Liga for Braga, Académico de Viseu, Beira-Mar and Académica de Coimbra.

== Career ==
Hélder made his Primeira Liga debut for Académica de Coimbra on 11 May 1975 in a game against CUF Barreiro.
