= Artur Oliveira =

Brazilian footballer (born 1969)

Personal information
- Full name: Artur Duarte de Oliveira
- Date of birth: 27 December 1969 (age 56)
- Place of birth: Rio Branco, Brazil
- Height: 1.74 m (5 ft 9 in)
- Position: Forward

Team information
- Current team: Caeté (head coach)

Senior career*
Years	Team	Apps	(Gls)
1989–1990	Rio Branco-AC		
1991	Independência		
1991–1992	Remo		
1992–1996	Boavista		
1996–1999	Porto	64	(11)
1999–2001	Vitória	22	(9)
2001	Botafogo	11	(3)
2002–2003	Figueirense		
2004	Remo		

Managerial career
- 2007: Rio Branco
- 2007: Remo
- 2008: Ananindeua
- 2008: Remo
- 2008: Castanhal
- 2009: São Raimundo-PA
- 2010: Cametá
- 2011: Atlético Acreano
- 2011–2012: Galvez
- 2013: Rio Branco-AC
- 2015: Galvez
- 2016: Rio Branco-AC
- 2017–2018: Bragantino do Pará
- 2018: Remo
- 2019–2020: Castanhal
- 2020: Caeté
- 2021: Castanhal
- 2021: Tapajós
- 2021: Bragantino do Pará
- 2021: Trem
- 2022–2023: Sena Madureira U20
- 2024–: Caeté
- * Club domestic league appearances and goals

Artur Duarte de Oliveira (born 27 December 1969), sometimes known as just Artur, is a Brazilian football coach and former player who played as a forward. He is the current head coach of Caeté.

== Playing career ==
Born in Rio Branco, Acre, Artur Oliveira spent the vast majority of his career in Portugal after starting out professionally at Clube do Remo. He signed in 1992 with Boavista FC, scoring 13 times in 25 games in his first season to help his team to the fourth place.

In the 1996 summer, after 29 league goals in his last two years combined, Artur Oliveira moved to Porto neighbours FC Porto, going on to win six major titles during his three-year spell, including three Primeira Liga championships in a row. On 18 September 1996 he was one of five players to find the net in a 5–0 away win against S.L. Benfica, with the domestic Supercup being conquered 6–0 on aggregate.

Artur Oliveira returned to his homeland in early 1999, going on to make his Série A debuts at nearly 30 with Esporte Clube Vitória. He retired five years later, with his first club Remo.

== Managerial career ==
Artur Oliveira started working as a manager in 2007, with Rio Branco Football Club, to where he returned six years after on 20 August. He was sacked only one month later.

== Honours ==
=== Player ===
Vitória

- Copa do Nordeste: 1999; Runner-up 2000
- Campeonato Baiano: 1999, 2000

Figueirense

- Campeonato Catarinense: 2002

Remo

- Campeonato Paraense: 1991, 1992, 1993, 2004

Boavista

- Supertaça Cândido de Oliveira: 1992
- Taça de Portugal: Runner-up 1992–93

Porto

- Primeira Liga: 1996–97, 1997–98, 1998–99
- Taça de Portugal: 1997–98
- Supertaça Cândido de Oliveira: 1996, 1998, Runner-up 1997

=== Manager ===
Rio Branco

- Campeonato Acriano: 2007

Remo

- Campeonato Paraense: 2008

São Raimundo-PA

- Campeonato Brasileiro Série D: 2009
