= Bobó Djalo =

Bissau Guinean footballer and manager

Personal information
- Full name: Mamadu Bobó Djalo
- Date of birth: 9 February 1963 (age 63)
- Place of birth: Canchungo, Guinea-Bissau
- Height: 1.75 m (5 ft 9 in)
- Position: Defensive midfielder

Youth career
- 1979–1980: Vilanovense
- 1980–1981: Porto

Senior career*
Years	Team	Apps	(Gls)
1981–1982	Porto	1	(0)
1982–1983	Águeda	–	(–)
1983–1984	Porto	4	(2)
1984–1985	Varzim	26	(0)
1985–1986	Vitória Guimarães	29	(4)
1986–1988	Marítimo	44	(2)
1988–1990	Estrela Amadora	59	(2)
1990–1997	Boavista	155	(2)
1998–1999	Gondomar	13	(0)

International career
1986	Portugal U21	4	(0)
1996	Guinea Bissau	2	(0)

Managerial career
- 2012–2013: Ermesinde (assistant)
- * Club domestic league appearances and goals

Mamadu Bobó Djalo (born 9 February 1963), sometimes known as just Bobó, is a Bissau-Guinean former professional football player and manager.

Between 2008 and 2011, Djalo worked as a scout for Chelsea.

== Personal life ==
Djalo is the father of the Bissau-Guinean footballer Matchoi Djaló.

== Honours ==
Porto

- Supertaça Cândido de Oliveira: 1981, 1983
- Taça de Portugal: 1983–84

Estrela da Amadora

- Taça de Portugal: 1989–90

Boavista

- Taça de Portugal: 1991–92, 1996–97
- Supertaça Cândido de Oliveira: 1992
