= Aloísio (footballer, born 1963) =

Brazilian footballer

Personal information
- Full name: Aloísio Pires Alves
- Date of birth: 16 August 1963 (age 63)
- Place of birth: Pelotas, Brazil
- Height: 1.85 m (6 ft 1 in)
- Position: Centre back

Youth career
- Internacional

Senior career*
Years	Team	Apps	(Gls)
1982–1988	Internacional	107	(7)
1988–1990	Barcelona	48	(0)
1990–2001	Porto	332	(15)
Total		487	(22)

International career
1983	Brazil U20	4	(0)
1988	Brazil	6	(0)

Managerial career
- 2003–2005: Porto (assistant)
- 2005–2006: Porto B
- 2006–2007: Vila Meã
- 2007–2008: Braga (assistant)
Medal record
Men's Football
Representing Brazil
Olympic Games
Silver medal – second place	1988 Seoul	Team
FIFA U20 World Cup
Winner	1983 Mexico
South American U20 Championship
Winner	1983 Bolivia
- * Club domestic league appearances and goals

Aloísio Pires Alves (born 16 August 1963), known simply as Aloísio, is a Brazilian former professional footballer who played as a central defender. He is currently the head coach of Juticalpa in the Honduran Liga Nacional de Fútbol Profesional de Honduras.

He spent 11 of his 19 years as a professional with Porto, appearing in 474 competitive matches with the club and winning 19 major titles.

== Club career ==
Aloísio was born in Pelotas, Rio Grande do Sul. He represented local Internacional in his country, helping the Porto Alegre side to three state leagues and the second position in the 1987 edition of the Série A, named Copa União in that year.

In 1988, Aloísio moved to Spain and joined La Liga giants Barcelona. Never an undisputed starter whilst in Catalonia, he did feature regularly as the teams before the emergence of the Dream Team won one Copa del Rey – a 2–0 win against Real Madrid– and the 1988–89 European Cup Winners' Cup, with the player starting in the final of the latter against Sampdoria (2–0).

After two seasons with Barça, Aloísio signed for Porto in Portugal, where he would remain for the following eleven years until his retirement. With the exception of his final season he never appeared in less than 28 matches in the Primeira Liga, being one of only five club players to win five consecutive national championships.

Aloísio retired from football in June 2001 at nearly 38 years of age, having won seven leagues, five cups and seven supercups with his main club and appearing in more than 400 official matches. Having begun working under him in January 2002, he was part of José Mourinho's coaching staff in the 2003–04 campaign as Porto won both the domestic and the UEFA Champions League; after one more year as assistant to Spaniard Víctor Fernández, he was appointed head coach of the reserve team in the third division.

== International career ==
During 1988, Aloísio earned six caps for Brazil. Also in that year, he helped the Olympic team win silver at the Summer Olympic Games in Seoul.

== Career statistics ==
=== Club ===
Appearances and goals by club, season and competition
Club	Season	League			Cup (Note: Includes the Copa del Rey and Taça de Portugal)		Continental		Other		Total	
Club	Season	Division	Apps	Goals	Apps	Goals	Apps	Goals	Apps	Goals	Apps	Goals
Barcelona	1988–89	La Liga	27	0	4	0	7 (Note: Appearances in the UEFA Cup Winners' Cup)	0	—		38	0
Barcelona	1989–90	La Liga	21	0	5	0	3	0	1 (Note: Appearance in the UEFA Super Cup)	0	30	0
Barcelona	Total		48	0	9	0	10	0	1	0	68	0
Porto	1990–91	Primeira Divisão	37	1	7	0	6 (Note: Appearances in the UEFA Champions League)	0	2 (Note: Appearances in the Supertaça Cândido de Oliveira)	0	52	1
Porto	1991–92	Primeira Divisão	33	0	7	0	3	0	2	0	45	0
Porto	1992–93	Primeira Divisão	28	3	2	0	7	0	3	0	40	3
Porto	1993–94	Primeira Divisão	32	0	6	1	10	0	2	0	50	1
Porto	1994–95	Primeira Divisão	31	5	3	0	5	1	4	0	43	6
Porto	1995–96	Primeira Divisão	29	0	5	0	4	0	3	0	41	0
Porto	1996–97	Primeira Divisão	28	0	2	0	7	0	1	0	38	0
Porto	1997–98	Primeira Divisão	28	0	4	1	5	0	1	0	38	1
Porto	1998–99	Primeira Divisão	33	4	1	0	6	0	2	0	42	4
Porto	1999–2000	Primeira Liga	30	0	5	0	12	0	2	0	49	0
Porto	2000–01	Primeira Liga	23	2	2	0	10 (Note: Nine appearances in the UEFA Cup and one in the UEFA Champions League)	0	1	0	36	2
Porto	Total		332	15	44	2	75	1	23	0	474	18
Career total			380	15	53	2	85	1	24	0	542	18

== Honours ==
Internacional

- Campeonato Gaúcho: 1982, 1983, 1984

Barcelona

- Copa del Rey: 1989–90
- UEFA Cup Winners' Cup: 1988–89

Porto

- Primeira Divisão: 1991–92, 1992–93, 1994–95, 1995–96, 1996–97, 1997–98, 1998–99
- Taça de Portugal: 1990–91, 1993–94, 1997–98, 1999–00, 2000–01
- Supertaça Cândido de Oliveira: 1990, 1991, 1993, 1994, 1996, 1998, 1999

Brazil U20

- FIFA World Youth Championship: 1983
- South American Youth Championship: 1983

Brazil

- Summer Olympic Games: Silver Medal 1988

Individual

- Bola de Prata: 1987
