= António Caetano =

Portuguese footballer (born 1966)

Personal information
- Full name: António de Oliveira Caetano
- Date of birth: 5 July 1966 (age 60)
- Place of birth: Feira, Portugal
- Height: 1.71 m (5 ft 7 in)
- Position: Left-back

Youth career
- 1979–1982: Feirense
- 1982–1984: Boavista

Senior career*
Years	Team	Apps	(Gls)
1984–1988	Boavista	38	(0)
1988–1990	Estrela Amadora	59	(1)
1990–1991	Boavista	29	(0)
1991–1992	Vitória Guimarães	31	(0)
1992–1996	Boavista	58	(2)
1996–1998	Belenenses	54	(4)
1998–2000	Beira-Mar	31	(0)
2000–2001	Feirense	11	(0)
Total		311	(7)

International career
1984–1986	Portugal U21	4	(1)

Managerial career
- 1999–2000: Beira-Mar (assistant)
- 2001–2002: Feirense
- 2002: Aves
- 2002–2003: Académico Viseu
- 2003–2004: Boavista (assistant)
- 2005: Sporting Pombal
- 2005–2006: Boavista (youth)
- 2007–2008: Esmoriz
- 2009: Sanjoanense
- 2010–2011: Naval (assistant)
- 2012: Shandong Luneng (youth)
- 2017: Lusitânia
- * Club domestic league appearances and goals

António de Oliveira Caetano (born 5 July 1966) is a Portuguese former professional footballer who played as a left-back. He was also a manager.

== Club career ==
Born in Feira (Santa Maria da Feira), Caetano played 16 uninterrupted Primeira Liga seasons, appearing in exactly 300 matches for Boavista FC (three spells, making his debut at only 17), C.F. Estrela da Amadora – helping the Lisbon club to win the Taça de Portugal in his second year– Vitória de Guimarães, C.F. Os Belenenses and S.C. Beira-Mar. He retired in 2001, aged 34.

Caetano worked as a manager in the following decade, mainly in the lower leagues and also as an assistant and with Boavista's juniors. In the 2002–03 campaign, he was in charge of Segunda Liga team C.D. Aves for 11 games.

== Honours ==
Estrela da Amadora

- Taça de Portugal: 1989–90

Boavista

- Supertaça Cândido de Oliveira: 1992

Beira-Mar

- Taça de Portugal: 1998–99
