= Dino Furacão =

Brazilian footballer (born 1961)

Personal information
- Full name: Raimundo Nonato Magalhães Barreto
- Date of birth: May 4, 1961 (age 65)
- Place of birth: Brazil
- Position: Striker

Senior career*
Years	Team	Apps	(Gls)
1982–1984	Bahia		
1985	XV de Jaú		
1985	São Bento		
1986–1987	Santos	19	(9)
1987–1990	Nacional	70	(13)
1990–1994	Beira-Mar	127	(28)
1994–1995	Vitória de Setúbal	30	(4)
1995–1996	Chaves	7	(2)
- * Club domestic league appearances and goals

Raimundo Nonato Magalhães Barreto (born 5 April 1964), known as Dino Furacão, is a Brazilian former footballer.

== Early life ==
He was born in 1961 in Brazil. He played basketball as a child.

== Career ==
He started his career with Brazilian side Bahia. In 1985, he signed for Brazilian side XV de Jaú. After that, he signed for Brazilian side São Bento. In 1986, he signed for Brazilian side Santos. In 1987, he signed for Portuguese side Nacional. In 1990, he signed for Portuguese side Beira-Mar. In 1994, he signed for Portuguese side Vitória de Setúbal. In 1995, he signed for Portuguese side Chaves.

== Personal life ==
He studied accounting. He has worked as a private school teacher.
