= Tihomir Rudež =

Croatian footballer

Personal information
- Date of birth: 14 July 1963 (age 63)
- Place of birth: Josipovac
- Height: 1.77 m (5 ft 10 in)
- Position: Striker

Senior career*
Years	Team	Apps	(Gls)
1983–1984	Osijek	67	(0)
1985–1986	Iskra Bugojno	29	(4)
1988–1989	Dinamo Vinkovci	29	(19)
1989–1992	Chaves	88	(29)
1992–1994	Paços Ferreira	41	(10)
1994–1995	Campomaiorense	31	(20)
1995–1996	Nacional	10	(1)
1996–1997	União Lamas	21	(3)
Total		255	(86=)
- * Club domestic league appearances and goals

Tihomir 'Rudi' Rudež (born 14 July 1963) is a Croatian former professional footballer who played as a striker.
