= William (footballer, born 1967) =

Brazilian football manager and former player

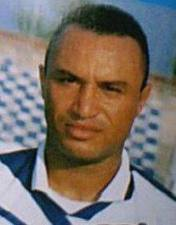

Personal information
- Full name: William Amaral de Andrade
- Date of birth: 27 December 1967 (age 58)
- Place of birth: Rio de Janeiro, Brazil
- Height: 1.82 m (6 ft 0 in)
- Position: Centre back

Senior career*
Years	Team	Apps	(Gls)
1985–1987	Botafogo		
1987–1989	Nacional	71	(6)
1989–1990	Vitória Guimarães	30	(2)
1990–1995	Benfica	97	(11)
1995–1996	Bastia	22	(1)
1996–2000	Compostela	61	(3)
2000–2002	Vitória Guimarães	20	(2)
Total		301	(25)

Managerial career
- 2004–2005: Valenciano
- 2006–2007: Compostela
- 2010: Compostela
- 2012: Vilaverdense
- 2016–2017: Mons Calpe
- 2019: Mons Calpe
- 2020: Lincoln Red Imps
- 2022–2023: Atlético Nacional (assistant)
- 2023: Atlético Nacional
- * Club domestic league appearances and goals

William Amaral de Andrade (born 27 December 1967), known simply as William, is a Brazilian former professional footballer who played as a central defender.

== Playing career ==
William was born in Rio de Janeiro. During his extensive career he played most notably for S.L. Benfica, from where he arrived in 1990 after spells at two other Portuguese clubs, C.D. Nacional and Vitória de Guimarães.

During his five-year spell, William helped Benfica to two Primeira Liga titles, forming an efficient partnership with compatriot Ricardo Gomes after arriving as a replacement for another Brazilian, Carlos Mozer. In the 1990–91 season he did not miss one single game for the champions, and still scored four goals.

After one season in France at SC Bastia, William moved to Spain with SD Compostela, being fairly used during four years (although he was never an automatic first-choice), two in La Liga and two in the second division. He then returned to Portugal and Vitória Guimarães, already the bearer of a passport from the country, and retired after two slow years in June 2002, aged nearly 35.

== Coaching career ==
From December 2004 to May 2005 with SC Valenciano, and during one month in 2012 with Vilaverdense FC, William worked in the Portuguese third level. He subsequently had two spells with former club Compostela, who now competed in the regional championships.

In 2016, William was named head coach of newly promoted Gibraltar Premier Division side Mons Calpe, appointing Gibraltar under-19 manager Terrence Jolley as his assistant and overseeing the arrivals of former professionals including Hugo Colace and Michele Di Piedi. On 17 January 2017, following a defeat against Glacis United, he was fired. After a brief return to the club in 2019, he was appointed manager of Lincoln Red Imps in May 2020. On 5 October 2020, the club confirmed William's departure.

On 13 October 2022, William was appointed assistant coach of Paulo Autuori at Colombian club Atlético Nacional. Following Paulo Autuori's resignation from Atlético Nacional on 6 July 2023, William was appointed as interim head coach and 13 days later he was promoted to head coach on a permanent basis. On 9 October, he left the club.

== Honours ==
Benfica

- Primeira Liga: 1990–91, 1993–94
- Taça de Portugal: 1992–93
