= Vítor Valente =

Portuguese football coach and former player

Personal information
- Full name: Vítor Sérgio dos Santos Valente
- Date of birth: 17 March 1965 (age 61)
- Place of birth: Lisbon, Portugal
- Height: 1.76 m (5 ft 9 in)
- Position: Goalkeeper

Youth career
- 1978–1980: Oeiras
- 1980–1981: Sporting CP
- 1981–1983: Benfica

Senior career*
Years	Team	Apps	(Gls)
1983–1984	Trafaria		
1984–1985	Casa Pia		
1985–1986	Atlético	22	(0)
1986–1987	Marítimo	14	(0)
1987–1989	Académica	17	(0)
1989–1991	União Madeira	45	(0)
1991–1993	Porto	2	(0)
1993–1995	Boavista	1	(0)
1995–1998	Belenenses	45	(0)
1998–1999	Alverca	4	(0)
1999–2002	Académica	15	(0)
2002–2003	Imortal	17	(0)
2003–2004	Pampilhosa	5	(0)
Total		187	(0)
- * Club domestic league appearances and goals

Vítor Sérgio dos Santos Valente (born 13 March 1965) is a Portuguese former professional footballer who played as a goalkeeper.

== Club career ==
After beginning in the lower leagues, Lisbon-born Valente made his Primeira Liga debut in 1986–87 while at the service of C.S. Marítimo, appearing in 14 league games for a final 13th position. He spent three of the following four seasons also in the top division, in representation of Académica de Coimbra and C.F. União.

In 1991, about one year after the club lost Zé Beto in a car accident, FC Porto signed Valente to act as backup to future club legend Vítor Baía, and he ended up playing only two matches in his two year-spell at the Estádio das Antas, totalling 13 minutes in two substitute appearances. He met the same fate at his next team, Boavista FC.

After three seasons with C.F. Os Belenenses (top flight, starting in his second year), the 32-year-old Valente joined F.C. Alverca of the same tier, being understudy to Paulo Santos. He then returned to his former side Académica, who now competed in the Segunda Liga.

Valente retired from football aged 39, following one-year spells at amateurs Imortal D.C. and F.C. Pampilhosa. Subsequently, he worked as a goalkeeper coach at U.D. Leiria, the Burkina Faso and Gabon national teams and CS Sfaxien, always under compatriot Paulo Duarte.
