= 1992–93 Primeira Divisão =

59th season of top-tier Portuguese football

Primeira Divisão
- Season: 1992–93
- Champions: Porto; 13th title
- Relegated: Tirsense; Espinho; Chaves
- Champions League: Porto (first round)
- Cup Winners' Cup: Benfica (first round)
- UEFA Cup: Sporting CP (first round); Boavista (first round); Marítimo (first round)
- Matches: 306
- Goals: 715 (2.34 per match)
- Top goalscorer: Jorge Cadete (17 goals)
- Biggest home win: Belenenses 7–0 Famalicão (9 May 1993)
- Biggest away win: Espinho 1–4 Porto (25 October 1992)
- Highest scoring: Marítimo 7–1 Gil Vicente (20 September 1992)

The 1992–93 Primeira Divisão was the 59th edition of top flight of Portuguese football. It started on 30 August 1992 with a match between Vitória de Guimarães and Beira-Mar, and ended on 13 June 1993. The league was contested by 18 clubs with Porto as the defending champions.

Porto qualified for the 1993–94 UEFA Champions League first round, Benfica qualified for the 1993–94 European Cup Winners' Cup first round, and Sporting CP, Boavista and Marítimo qualified for the 1993–94 UEFA Cup; in opposite, Tirsense, Espinho and Chaves were relegated to the Liga de Honra. Jorge Cadete was the top scorer with 17 goals.

== Promotion and relegation ==
=== Teams relegated to Liga de Honra ===
- Torreense
- Penafiel
- União da Madeira

Torreense, Penafiel, and União da Madeira were consigned to the Liga de Honra following their final classification in 1991-92 season.

=== Teams promoted from Liga de Honra ===
- Espinho
- Belenenses
- Tirsense

The other three teams were replaced by Espinho, Belenenses, and Tirsense from the Liga de Honra.

== Teams ==
=== Stadia and locations ===
Location of teams in Primeira Divisão 1992-93 (Mainland)
Location of teams in Primeira Divisão 1992-93 (Madeira)

Team	Head coach	City	Stadium	1991–92 finish
Beira-Mar	(Portugal) Vítor Urbano	Aveiro	Estádio Mário Duarte	8th
Belenenses	(Brazil) Abel Braga	Lisbon	Estádio do Restelo	2nd in Divisão de Honra
Benfica	(Croatia) Tomislav Ivic	Lisbon	Estádio da Luz	2nd
Boavista	(Portugal) Manuel José	Porto	Estádio do Bessa	3rd
Braga	(Portugal) Vítor Manuel	Braga	Estádio Primeiro de Maio	11th
Chaves	(Bulgaria) Zdravkov	Chaves	Estádio Municipal de Chaves	9th
Espinho	(Portugal) Quinito	Espinho	Estádio Comendador Manuel Violas	1st in Divisão de Honra
Estoril	(Portugal) Fernando Santos	Estoril	Estádio António Coimbra da Mota	10th
Famalicão	(Portugal) José Romão	Vila Nova de Famalicão	Estádio Municipal 22 de Junho	14th
Farense	(Spain) Paco Fortes	Faro	Estádio de São Luís	6th
Gil Vicente	(Portugal) Vítor Oliveira	Barcelos	Estádio Adelino Ribeiro Novo	13th
Marítimo	(Brazil) Paulo Autuori	Funchal	Estádio dos Barreiros	7th
Paços de Ferreira	(Portugal) Prof. Neca	Paços de Ferreira	Estádio da Mata Real	12th
Porto	(Brazil) Carlos Alberto Silva	Porto	Estádio das Antas	1st
Salgueiros	(Serbia and Montenegro) Zoran Filipovic	Porto	Estádio Engenheiro Vidal Pinheiro	15th
Sporting	(England) Bobby Robson	Lisbon	Estádio José Alvalade	4th
Tirsense	(Portugal) Rodolfo Reis	Santo Tirso	Estádio Abel Alves de Figueiredo	3rd in Divisão de Honra
Vitória de Guimarães	(Brazil) Marinho Peres	Guimarães	Estádio D. Afonso Henriques	5th

=== Managerial changes ===
Team	Outgoing manager	Date of vacancy	Position in table	Incoming manager	Date of appointment
Benfica	(Croatia) Tomislav Ivic	25 October 1992	2nd	(Portugal) Toni	26 October 1992
Chaves	(Bulgaria) Zdravkov	1 November 1992	18th	(Portugal) Henrique Calisto	15 November 1992
Paços de Ferreira	(Portugal) Prof. Neca	27 December 1992	15th	(Portugal) Jaime Pacheco	28 December 1992
Vitória de Guimarães	(Brazil) Marinho Peres	1 January 1993	16th	(Portugal) Bernardino Pedroto	2 January 1993
Braga	(Portugal) Vítor Manuel	28 March 1993	15th	(Portugal) António Oliveira	29 March 1993
Salgueiros	(Serbia and Montenegro) Zoran Filipovic	28 March 1993	16th	(Portugal) Mário Reis	29 March 1993

== League table ==
Pos	Team	Pld	W	D	L	GF	GA	GD	Pts	Qualification or relegation
1	Porto (C)	34	24	6	4	57	17	+40	54	Qualification to Champions League first round
2	Benfica	34	22	8	4	60	18	+42	52	Qualification to Cup Winners' Cup first round (Note: Benfica qualified for the Cup Winners' Cup as Portuguese Cup winners)
3	Sporting CP	34	17	11	6	59	30	+29	45	Qualification to UEFA Cup first round
4	Boavista	34	14	11	9	46	34	+12	39	Qualification to UEFA Cup first round
5	Marítimo	34	15	7	12	56	48	+8	37	Qualification to UEFA Cup first round
6	Farense	34	11	13	10	41	36	+5	35	
7	Belenenses	34	11	12	11	42	40	+2	34	
8	Beira-Mar	34	10	12	12	24	33	−9	32	
9	Gil Vicente	34	12	7	15	34	42	−8	31	
10	Paços de Ferreira	34	10	11	13	35	44	−9	31	
11	Vitória de Guimarães	34	14	3	17	41	53	−12	31	
12	Braga	34	12	6	16	33	34	−1	30	
13	Estoril	34	9	12	13	29	41	−12	30	
14	Famalicão	34	10	10	14	29	48	−19	30	
15	Salgueiros	34	10	9	15	28	44	−16	29	
16	Tirsense (R)	34	10	8	16	27	37	−10	28	Relegation to Segunda Divisão de Honra
17	Espinho (R)	34	9	10	15	38	55	−17	28	Relegation to Segunda Divisão de Honra
18	Chaves (R)	34	4	8	22	34	61	−27	16	Relegation to Segunda Divisão de Honra

Source: Primeira Divisão
Rules for classification: 1st points, 2nd goals average, 3rd number of points obtained in the matches between the teams in question
(C) Champions; (R) Relegated

== Results ==
Home \ Away	BEM	BEL	BEN	BOA	BRA	CHA	ESP	EST	FAM	FAR	GVI	MAR	PAÇ	POR	SAL	SCP	TIR	VGU
Beira-Mar		0–0	1–0	0–2	0–0	0–0	2–1	3–0	1–1	1–1	0–1	1–0	0–1	0–1	1–0	1–1	1–0	1–0
Belenenses	0–0		1–1	2–1	1–2	1–0	1–2	0–0	7–0	1–1	2–0	1–0	4–1	0–0	1–0	2–2	3–0	3–0
Benfica	0–0	5–1		2–0	2–1	3–1	5–1	4–0	1–0	1–0	2–1	5–1	5–0	0–0	0–0	1–0	1–0	3–1
Boavista	4–0	1–0	2–3		0–0	2–0	0–0	1–0	4–0	3–1	2–0	2–1	0–0	1–0	1–0	0–0	0–0	1–3
Braga	1–2	3–0	0–2	2–1		1–0	2–2	2–1	4–1	0–1	0–1	2–1	2–0	0–1	3–0	0–0	3–0	0–1
Chaves	0–0	1–2	0–1	0–1	2–1		1–1	5–2	1–1	2–2	1–2	1–2	1–2	1–2	3–0	0–2	1–0	1–1
Espinho	1–3	3–1	0–3	2–2	0–1	2–2		3–1	1–0	1–1	1–0	0–1	1–1	1–4	1–1	3–1	1–0	2–1
Estoril	1–0	1–1	0–0	0–0	0–0	2–1	1–0		2–2	1–0	0–0	1–0	0–0	1–3	1–0	2–2	4–0	1–0
Famalicão	0–1	0–0	1–0	1–1	1–1	2–1	0–0	1–2		1–0	0–0	2–0	1–0	0–3	3–1	1–2	1–0	0–0
Farense	2–2	1–1	0–0	1–1	1–0	3–0	4–1	1–1	3–0		3–1	2–2	2–0	1–0	2–0	0–0	1–0	4–1
Gil Vicente	3–0	0–1	1–1	0–2	0–1	5–2	1–2	2–0	0–1	2–1		2–0	0–1	0–3	2–0	1–0	1–2	2–0
Marítimo	1–0	4–2	1–1	3–2	1–0	2–1	2–1	1–1	4–2	2–1	7–1		1–1	0–1	2–2	4–2	3–1	3–0
Paços de Ferreira	4–0	1–1	0–2	1–4	3–0	2–0	2–2	2–0	0–0	4–1	0–0	1–1		1–2	0–1	0–3	1–0	1–0
Porto	0–0	3–0	1–0	1–1	2–0	2–1	1–0	1–0	0–1	3–0	4–1	2–0	2–0		4–1	0–0	3–1	2–0
Salgueiros	0–0	2–1	0–3	3–1	2–0	1–1	2–1	2–1	0–2	0–0	1–1	1–2	2–2	0–3		2–0	1–0	0–1
Sporting CP	3–1	3–0	2–0	4–0	2–0	5–0	3–0	1–1	4–3	2–0	0–0	3–2	3–1	1–1	0–1		0–0	4–1
Tirsense	2–1	0–0	1–2	1–1	2–1	2–1	2–0	1–0	3–0	0–0	1–1	1–0	0–0	3–1	1–1	0–1		2–0
Vitória de Guimarães	2–1	2–1	0–1	3–2	1–0	4–2	3–1	2–1	1–0	2–0	1–2	2–2	3–2	1–3	0–1	2–3	2–1	

Source: Foradejogo (in Portuguese)
Legend: Blue = home team win; Yellow = draw; Red = away team win.

== Top goalscorers ==
Rank	Player	Club	Goals
1	(Portugal) Jorge Cadete	Sporting	17
2	(Nigeria) Ricky	Boavista	14
3	(Brazil) Artur	Boavista	13
4	(Romania) Timofte	Porto	11
4	(Brazil) Edmilson	Marítimo	11
4	(Bulgaria) Balakov	Sporting	11
4	(Brazil) Jorge Andrade	Marítimo	11
8	(Brazil) Jussiê	Paços de Ferreira	10
8	(Croatia) Karoglan	Chaves	10
8	(Serbia) Drulovic	Gil Vicente	10

Source: Foradejogo

== Attendances ==
#	Club	Average
1	Porto	26,529
2	Benfica	24,765
3	Sporting	22,000
4	Beira-Mar	10,647
5	Boavista	9,706
6	Braga	9,529
7	Vitória SC	9,118
8	Marítimo	8,941
9	Espinho	8,324
10	Farense	8,118
11	Famalicão	7,794
12	Gil Vicente	7,765
13	Os Belenenses	7,294
14	Paços de Ferreira	7,000
15	Salgueiros	6,588
16	Estoril Praia	5,765
17	Tirsense	5,047
18	Chaves	4,294
