= Lubomír Vlk =

Czech footballer and manager

Personal information
- Full name: Lubomír Vlk
- Date of birth: 21 July 1964 (age 62)
- Place of birth: Uherské Hradiště, Czechoslovakia
- Height: 1.85 m (6 ft 1 in)
- Position: Defender

Senior career*
Years	Team	Apps	(Gls)
1985–1990	TJ Vítkovice	102	(15)
1990–1993	FC Porto	30	(7)
1993–1994	FC Vítkovice	28	(5)

International career
1987–1991	Czechoslovakia	11	(2)

Managerial career
- 2007: FC Vítkovice
- 2010: FC Vítkovice
- 2011–2012: Slavia Orlová
- 2017: MFK Karviná
- 2018: MFK Karviná
- * Club domestic league appearances and goals

Lubomír Vlk (born 21 July 1964) is a former Czech footballer and coach.

== Career ==
Vlk initially played football in his hometown of Uherské Hradiště as a defender. He won the 1985–86 Czechoslovak First League with Vítkovice and spent three seasons in FC Porto winning two league titles, but was plagued by injuries. He returned to Vítkovice in 1993 but suffered another knee injury that forced him to quit his career.

Following his retirement from playing career, Vlk became a club official and worked for FC Vítkovice until the club's bankruptcy in 2011. He was appointed MFK Karviná in 2017, with his first match in charge being a 2–1 league victory against FK Jablonec in November 2017.
