= Manuel José =

Portuguese football manager (born 1946)

Personal information
- Full name: Manuel José de Jesus Silva
- Date of birth: 9 April 1946 (age 80)
- Place of birth: Vila Real de Santo António, Portugal
- Position: Midfielder

Youth career
- 1962–1964: Benfica

Senior career*
Years	Team	Apps	(Gls)
1964–1965	Benfica B		
1965–1969	Benfica	1	(0)
1965–1966	→ Sporting Covilhã (loan)		
1966–1967	→ Varzim (loan)		
1967–1968	→ Belenenses (loan)		
1969–1973	União Tomar	111	(12)
1973–1976	Farense	82	(6)
1976–1977	Beira-Mar	28	(1)
1977–1979	Sporting Espinho	27	(2)

Managerial career
- 1978–1982: Sporting Espinho
- 1982–1983: Vitória Guimarães
- 1983–1985: Portimonense
- 1985–1986: Sporting CP
- 1987–1989: Braga
- 1990: Sporting CP
- 1990–1991: Sporting Espinho
- 1991–1996: Boavista
- 1996: Marítimo
- 1997: Benfica
- 1999–2001: União Leiria
- 2001–2002: Al Ahly
- 2002–2003: Belenenses
- 2003–2009: Al Ahly
- 2009–2010: Angola
- 2010: Al-Ittihad
- 2011–2012: Al Ahly
- 2012: Persepolis
- * Club domestic league appearances and goals

Manuel José de Jesus Silva ComM (born 9 April 1946), simply known as Manuel José (Portuguese pronunciation: [mɐnuˈɛl ʒuˈzɛ]), is a Portuguese football manager.

Manuel José has managed several football clubs, including Vitória de Guimarães, Sporting CP, Sporting de Braga, Boavista, Benfica, Al Ahly and Belenenses. He holds the record for the most matches managed in Portugal's Primeira Liga.

Manuel José has managed clubs including Vitória de Guimarães, Sporting CP, Sporting de Braga, Boavista, Benfica, Al Ahly and Belenenses. He holds the record for the most matches managed in Portugal’s Primeira Liga.[2][3]

== Coaching career ==
Manuel José first started to manage S.C. Espinho in 1978, where he gained promotion to the 1979–80 Primeira Liga. His first notorious management spell was at Vitória de Guimarães, which he coached during 1982 and 1983, guiding them to their first UEFA Cup after a 4th-place finish. The following season, he moved to Portimonense and in his second season there, he took the team to their highest Primeira Liga place, 5th, qualifying them to the UEFA Cup. Moving to Sporting CP in 1985, he was sacked in his second season, after a 6-game winless spree.

He is credited for discovering Luís Figo while he was working with Sporting CP, a fact that he denies. Some of his most famous matches in his Sporting CP career were a 7–1 win over arch rivals Benfica, the widest win in the Lisbon derby, and a 9–0 away win against Íþróttabandalag Akraness, from Iceland, in the 1986–87 UEFA Cup, a record that still remains as their biggest away win in UEFA competitions. He moved to Sporting de Braga where he couldn't manage to find the success he had found in his former teams. Again at Sporting CP in 1990, he was sacked that same year after being eliminated 1–2 in their home stadium, for the Taça de Portugal, to Marítimo. After failing promotion to the 1991–92 Primeira Liga, with his first club, Sporting de Espinho, he moved to Boavista where he won the Taça de Portugal in his first season, and the Supertaça in his second one, also managing to lead them to the Taça de Portugal final in the same year. After five seasons with Boavista, he signed with Marítimo in 1996, although he replaced Paulo Autuori as Benfica manager in the middle of the 1996–97 season and finished in 3rd place. Despite his bad results, he remained for the next season until a humiliating 3–1 defeat to Rio Ave lead Benfica's direction to sack him.

In November 1999, Manuel José replaced Mário Reis as the manager of União de Leiria. In 2001 he signed with Egyptian club Al Ahly, with the main goal being to win the Egyptian Premier League. He marked his first victory with Al Ahly in a friendly game victory 1–0 over Real Madrid. He accomplished the biggest win against the rivals Zamalek by 6–1 before he was sacked after failing to win the league that year, but won his first African Champions League and African Super Cup with a squad consisting mostly of promising young stars like Hossam Ghaly. He returned to Portugal to coach Belenenses in 2002, but left to sign again with Al Ahly the following year.

Since returning to Al Ahly, Manuel José helped give the team a record-breaking unbeaten run of 55 matches. He also managed to qualify them for the African Champions League Final four consecutive times, in 2005, 2006, 2007 and 2008, winning all but the 2007 final, the first coach to achieve such a feat and bringing his tally to four CAF Champions League titles, making him the most successful manager of the competition. Moreover, he also won the CAF Super Cup in 2006, 2007 and 2009, the Egyptian League five consecutive times, 2004–05, 2005–06, 2006–07, 2007–08 and 2008–09, the Egypt Cup in 2005–06 and 2006–07 and the Egyptian Super Cup four consecutive times, 2005, 2006, 2007 and 2008.

Arguably his best period in Al-Ahly was the 2005–06 season when Manuel José accomplished the African treble winning the Cup, the League and the Champions League. Other successes that season include the triumphs in the National Super Cup, the African Super Cup and managing to take an African team to their first ever podium in the Club World Cup. Al-Ahly only conceded three defeats in 2006, with two of them coming in the CAF Champions League and the other in the FIFA Club World Cup, in the first half of the 2006–07 season, meaning the team went undefeated the whole 2005–06 season, these achievements enabled José to win the CAF Coach of the Year award in 2006, becoming the first non-African to win the award while managing a club. Although reports were surfacing that he would be on the brink of taking over the Portugal national team after Luiz Felipe Scolari's departure, the Portuguese Football Federation hired instead Carlos Queiroz. Manuel José was honoured by the Egyptian President Hosni Mubarak with the Medal of Sport of First Class for his contributions to Ahly and Egyptian Football on 24 December 2006 and with the Ordem do Mérito in 2008, by Portuguese President Aníbal Cavaco Silva. On 13 May 2009 José was officially appointed by the Angolan Football Federation as the national team's head coach with views on their participation in the 2010 Africa Cup of Nations, which Angola hosted. He penned a one-year contract and took over when he finished the season with Al-Ahly.

Manuel José was awarded the Globos de Ouro Best Portuguese Manager award in 2009 by SIC television network, on his fourth consecutive nomination. After Angola's defeat, against Ghana, in the quarter-finals of the 2010 Africa Cup of Nations, he apologized the entire Angolan people for their premature elimination and left his post by mutual agreement. On 31 May 2010 Al-Ittihad officials hired the Portuguese coach and former Angola manager as their new head coach. In December 2010 José resigned after eight consecutive draws that cost Ittihad their leadership of the board, this marked the first time that José didn't complete a contract for the past 10 years.

On 1 January 2011, Manuel José returned to Al Ahly signing a one-and-a-half-year contract. Uppon his arrival to the Cairo International Airport from Portugal, he was greeted by about 3,000 Al Ahly fans. He had been pointed out as a coach likely to succeed Hassan Shehata after he left the Egyptian managerial position in early June 2011. However, Bob Bradley was chosen for the job. On 7 July 2011, José won his sixth Egyptian championship after recovering from a 6-point deficit to league leaders, rivals Zamalek, when his team was lying on the fourth place and finished ahead of Zamalek, the eventual runners-up, by 5 points. During the Port Said Stadium disaster on 1 February 2012, he was punched and kicked but otherwise unhurt. He has stated that his relationship with the Egyptian people saved him from being killed. Shortly after the clashes, Manuel José made a €47,000 donation to the Al-Ahly fund created to support the victims' families and attended the wake held in honour of the ones who had died, when he returned to Portugal he said he wanted to finish his career at the Egyptian club in remembrance of the lost souls. He returned to Egypt a few days later, on 16 February. He had lost against Espanyol, it was his last match with Al-Ahly, ending his career in coaching in Egypt. He had left after his contract has ended. He had held a press conference after the match stating that Al-Ahly department is trying to renew his contract but, he had refused as there is political unrest in Egypt and also for the stoppage of Football in the nation as he stated "Politics had corrupted football in Egypt". He is recognized as a football legend in Egypt by The Ultras fans either Zamlkawy or Ahlawy.

On 3 July 2012, Manuel José was named as Persepolis's head coach and signed a one-year contract with the club, replacing Mustafa Denizli, who resigned from his position in June 2012 for personal reasons. On 7 December 2012, it was announced that Manuel José was no longer the team's head coach for the upcoming fixtures. On 10 December 2012, he was officially sacked by the club and was replaced by Yahya Golmohammadi.

=== Statistics ===
As of 3 December 2012

Team	From	To	Record							
Team	From	To	G	W	D	L	Win %	GF	GA	±
Espinho	July 1978	July 1982	120	47	33	40	39.17	135	137	–2
Vitória	July 1982	May 1983	30	11	10	9	36.67	35	24	+11
Portimonense	June 1983	July 1985	60	24	14	22	40.00	78	78	0
Sporting CP	July 1985	October 1986	40	23	10	7	57.50	91	42	+49
Braga	January 1987	May 1989	48	13	22	13	27.08	54	66	–12
Sporting CP	May 1990	November 1990	9	3	3	3	33.33	16	15	+1
Boavista	May 1991	May 1996	170	77	45	48	45.29	236	169	+67
Marítimo	May 1996	December 1996	20	7	3	10	35.00	25	20	+5
Benfica	January 1997	July 1997	20	10	5	5	50.00	29	15	+14
União Leiria	November 1999	May 2001	62	26	19	17	41.94	73	66	+7
Al Ahly	July 2001	May 2002	37	26	7	4	70.27	68	27	+41
Belenenses	June 2002	July 2003	34	11	10	13	32.35	47	48	–1
Al-Ahly	July 2003	June 2009	169	129	27	13	76.33	279	97	+182
Angola	May 2009	January 2010	4	1	2	1	25.00	6	5	+1
Al-Ittihad	May 2010	December 2010	15	4	10	1	26.67	28	16	+12
Al Ahly	January 2011	February 2012	15	11	3	1	73.33	28	12	+16
Persepolis	July 2012	December 2012	17	5	6	6	29.41	20	17	+3
Total			870	425	229	213	48.85%	1248	854	+394

== Honours ==
=== Player ===
Benfica

- Primeira Liga: 1968–69

=== Managerial ===
Sporting de Espinho

- Segunda Divisão Portuguesa – Série Norte: 1978–79

Boavista

- Supertaça Cândido de Oliveira: 1992
- Taça de Portugal: 1991–92

Al-Ahly

- Egyptian Premier League: 2004–05, 2005–06, 2006–07, 2007–08, 2008–09, 2010–11
- Egypt Cup: 2005–06, 2006–07
- Egyptian Super Cup: 2005, 2006, 2007, 2008
- CAF Champions League: 2001, 2005, 2006, 2008
- CAF Super Cup: 2002, 2006, 2007, 2009
- FIFA Club World Cup: Third place 2006

=== Individual ===
- Globos de Ouro Best Portuguese Manager: 2009
- CAF Coach of the Year: 2006

=== Special awards ===
- Medal of Sport of First Class, by the Egyptian President Hosni Mubarak
- Comendador da Ordem do Mérito, by the Portuguese President Aníbal Cavaco Silva
