= José Tavares (footballer) =

Portuguese footballer

Personal information
- Full name: José Fernando Campos Tavares
- Date of birth: 23 April 1966 (age 60)
- Place of birth: Vila Nova de Gaia, Portugal
- Height: 1.82 m (6 ft 0 in)
- Position: Midfielder

Youth career
- 1979–1983: Oliveira Douro

Senior career*
Years	Team	Apps	(Gls)
1983–1988	Oliveira Douro		
1988–1990	Infesta	31	(12)
1990–1991	Porto	7	(1)
1991–1994	Boavista	84	(8)
1994–1995	Benfica	20	(2)
1995–1998	Boavista	72	(3)
1998–1999	União Leiria	2	(0)
1999–2003	Infesta	78	(12)
Total		294	(38)

International career
1994–1996	Portugal	8	(0)
- * Club domestic league appearances and goals

José Fernando Campos Tavares (born 23 April 1966) is a Portuguese former professional footballer who played mainly as a central midfielder.

== Club career ==
Tavares was born in Vila Nova de Gaia, Porto District. During his career he played for C.F. Oliveira do Douro, F.C. Infesta, FC Porto, Boavista FC, S.L. Benfica (after an unsuccessful season, he returned to Boavista) and U.D. Leiria.

Tavares retired in 2003 at the age of 37 after a second spell with Infesta, amassing Primeira Liga totals of 185 games and 14 goals over the course of nine seasons.

== International career ==
With the Portugal national team, Tavares was in the squad that participated in the UEFA Euro 1996 tournament, and earned a total of eight caps.

== Honours ==
Porto

- Taça de Portugal: 1990–91
- Supertaça Cândido de Oliveira: 1990

Boavista

- Taça de Portugal: 1991–92, 1996–97
- Supertaça Cândido de Oliveira: 1992, 1997
