= Vítor Paneira =

Portuguese football player and manager (born 1966)

Personal information
- Full name: Vítor Manuel da Costa Araújo
- Date of birth: 16 February 1966 (age 60)
- Place of birth: Calendário, Portugal
- Height: 1.77 m (5 ft 10 in)
- Position: Midfielder

Team information
- Current team: Paços Ferreira (manager)

Youth career
- 1981–1982: Famalicão
- 1982–1983: Riopele
- 1983–1984: Famalicão

Senior career*
Years	Team	Apps	(Gls)
1984–1987	Famalicão	56	(3)
1987–1988	Vizela	37	(13)
1988–1995	Benfica	207	(28)
1995–1999	Vitória Guimarães	128	(15)
1999–2001	Académica	44	(2)
Total		472	(61)

International career
1987	Portugal U21	3	(0)
1988–1996	Portugal	44	(4)

Managerial career
- 2002–2003: Serzedelo
- 2003–2005: Ribeirão
- 2005: Moreirense
- 2005–2006: Marco
- 2007–2008: Vila Meã
- 2008–2009: Famalicão
- 2009–2010: Boavista
- 2010–2011: Gondomar
- 2011–2013: Tondela
- 2014–2015: Varzim
- 2015: Tondela
- 2023–2025: Varzim
- 2026–: Paços Ferreira
- * Club domestic league appearances and goals

Vítor Manuel da Costa Araújo (born 16 February 1966), known as Vítor Paneira, is a Portuguese former professional footballer who played as a right midfielder. He is currently manager of Liga 3 club Paços de Ferreira.

He excelled in the late 80s and early 90s with Benfica, to where he arrived from the lower leagues, going on to amass Primeira Liga totals of 335 games and 43 goals over 11 seasons (289/44 in official matches with his main club). He also played for Vitória de Guimarães in the competition.

A Portugal international for eight years, Paneira represented the country at Euro 1996. In a managerial career of over 20 years, he had two spells each at Tondela and Varzim, briefly leading the former in the top flight.

== Club career ==
Born in Calendário, Vila Nova de Famalicão, Braga District, Paneira started playing professionally with his hometown side F.C. Famalicão, joining F.C. Vizela of the Segunda Liga in the 1987–88 season and also receiving his first under-21 call-ups during the Toulon Tournament.

Shortly after, Paneira signed for S.L. Benfica, and remained there until the end of the 1994–95 campaign, being an undisputed starter for the vast majority of his spell as he helped the Lisbon club to the Primeira Liga championship three times, adding the 1993 Taça de Portugal. He also appeared in the 1990 Champions Cup final, with his side losing 1–0 to AC Milan. In the 1992–93 UEFA Cup he scored twice in a 2–1 home win against Juventus FC, coached by Giovanni Trapattoni (albeit in a 4–2 aggregate defeat).

Paneira moved to Vitória S.C. for 1995–96, due to problems with Benfica manager Artur Jorge which was also part of a locker room clean-up – he was team captain when this occurred – and spent four seasons there. In summer 1999 he joined Académica de Coimbra, and retired at 35 after two years in the second division.

== International career ==
Paneira made his debut for Portugal the same year he signed for Benfica, in a 0–0 friendly draw with Sweden on 12 October 1988. In total, he won 44 caps (42 for Benfica and two for Guimarães) and scored four goals in a seven-year period, playing his last international in another friendly, a 1–0 victory over the Republic of Ireland on 29 May 1996.

Paneira was chosen by António Oliveira for the Lusitanos squad that reached the quarter-finals at UEFA Euro 1996, but was one of the few players that never left the bench.

== Coaching career ==
Paneira started his coaching career in 2002, with GD Serzedelo of division four. He also managed his first club Famalicão, but in the regional leagues.

On 16 December 2009, Paneira was named coach of Boavista FC, with the 2001 league champions now in the third tier. He was appointed at another side from that league, C.D. Tondela, on 24 May 2011, leading them to promotion in the playoffs in his first season.

On 10 June 2012, Paneira signed a one-year contract extension. He was relieved of his duties on 8 November of the following year, leaving the team in ninth position.

In March 2014, Paneira took charge of Varzim S.C. in the third division. He was fired in early May 2015 due to poor results.

Paneira returned to Tondela on 30 May 2015, being appointed manager for the club's first-ever season in the Portuguese top flight. He was dismissed on 6 October, after winning and drawing one each of the first seven games.

On 10 April 2023, Paneira returned to work for the first time in over seven years, signing with Varzim until 2025; he was their third manager of the season, with four games remaining. The team avoided the drop from Liga 3 on the final day with a 1–0 win over AD Fafe.

On 25 August 2026, Paneira became head coach of third-tier F.C. Paços de Ferreira.

== Other ventures ==
Immediately after retiring and still as an active coach, Paneira worked as a sports commentator with cable channel Sport TV.

== Career statistics ==
=== Club ===
Appearances and goals by club, season and competition
Club	Season	League		Cup		Europe		Other		Total	
Club	Season	Apps	Goals	Apps	Goals	Apps	Goals	Apps	Goals	Apps	Goals
Famalicão	1985–86					–		–			
Famalicão	1986–87					–		–			
Famalicão	Total					–		0	0		
Vizela	1987–88					–		–			
Benfica	1988–89	32	1	4	1	4	0	–		40	2
Benfica	1989–90	26	3	2	1	8	0	2 (Note: Appearances and goals in Supertaça Cândido de Oliveira)	0	38	4
Benfica	1990–91	36	9	3	1	2	0	–		41	10
Benfica	1991–92	29	0	5	2	8	1	2	0	44	3
Benfica	1992–93	28	6	7	2	8	4	–		43	12
Benfica	1993–94	32	6	2	1	8	1	3	0	45	8
Benfica	1994–95	24	3	4	1	8	0	2	1	38	5
Benfica	Total	207	28	27	9	46	6	9	1	289	44
Vitória Guimarães	1995–96	30	5	3	1	4	0	–		37	6
Vitória Guimarães	1996–97	33	7	0	0	3	1	–		36	8
Vitória Guimarães	1997–98	33	2	1	0	1	0	–		35	2
Vitória Guimarães	1998–99	32	1	1	0	1	0	–		34	1
Vitória Guimarães	Total	128	15	5	1	9	1	0	0	142	17
Académica	1999–00	28	2	2	0	–		–		30	2
Académica	2000–01	16	0	1	0	–		–		17	0
Académica	Total	44	2	3	0	–		–		47	2
Career total		379	45	35	10	55	7	9	1	478	63

=== International ===
Appearances and goals by national team and year
National team	Year	Apps	Goals
Portugal	1988	2	0
Portugal	1989	11	3
Portugal	1990	4	0
Portugal	1991	6	1
Portugal	1992	8	0
Portugal	1993	5	0
Portugal	1994	6	0
Portugal	1996	2	0
Total		44	4

Portugal score listed first, score column indicates score after each Paneira goal.

List of international goals scored by Vítor Paneira
No.	Date	Venue	Cap	Opponent	Score	Result	Competition
1	25 January 1989	Olympic Stadium, Athens, Greece	3	Greece	2–1	2–1	Friendly
2	15 February 1989	Estádio da Luz, Lisbon, Portugal	4	Belgium	1–0	1–1	1990 FIFA World Cup qualification
3	26 April 1989	Estádio da Luz, Lisbon, Portugal	6	Switzerland	3–1	3–1	1990 FIFA World Cup qualification
4	20 February 1991	Estádio das Antas, Porto, Portugal	21	Malta	4–0	5–0	UEFA Euro 1992 qualifying

== Honours ==
=== Player ===
Benfica

- Primeira Divisão: 1988–89, 1990–91, 1993–94
- Taça de Portugal: 1992–93
- Supertaça Cândido de Oliveira: 1989
- European Cup runner-up: 1989–90

=== Manager ===
Ribeirão

- Terceira Divisão: 2003–04

Tondela

- Segunda Divisão: 2011–12
