= Alfredo Castro (footballer) =

Portuguese footballer (born 1962)

Alfredo
Personal information
- Full name: Alfredo da Silva Castro
- Date of birth: 5 October 1962 (age 64)
- Place of birth: Vila do Conde, Portugal
- Height: 1.82 m (6 ft 0 in)
- Position: Goalkeeper

Youth career
- 1978–1981: Rio Ave

Senior career*
Years	Team	Apps	(Gls)
1981–1984	Rio Ave	56	(0)
1984–1998	Boavista	253	(0)
Total		309	(0)

International career
1994–1996	Portugal	3	(0)
- * Club domestic league appearances and goals

Alfredo da Silva Castro (born 5 October 1962), known simply as Alfredo, is a Portuguese former professional footballer who played as a goalkeeper.

He appeared in 309 Primeira Liga matches over 17 seasons, representing Rio Ave and Boavista.

== Club career ==
Alfredo was born in Vila do Conde. After emerging through the youth system of hometown's Rio Ave F.C. he went on to represent Boavista FC, being an undisputed starter at the latter for more than a Primeira Liga decade.

Following his retirement in 1998 aged 35, Alfredo served as goalkeeping coach for his last club as it won its only national championship in the 2000–01 season. During his playing spell with the Porto side he added four other major titles in the 90s, two Taça de Portugal and as many Supertaça Cândido de Oliveira.

In the 2009–10 campaign, shortly after leaving Boavista, Alfredo returned to his first team Rio Ave, again being in charge of their goalkeepers. He also worked in that capacity with CS Pandurii Târgu Jiu from Romania.

== International career ==
Alfredo earned three caps for Portugal in two years, and was in roster for the UEFA Euro 1996 tournament.

== Honours ==
Boavista

- Taça de Portugal: 1991–92, 1996–97
- Supertaça Cândido de Oliveira: 1992, 1997
