= Marlon Brandão =

Brazilian footballer (born 1963)

Personal information
- Full name: Marlon Roniel Brandão
- Date of birth: 1 September 1963 (age 63)
- Place of birth: Marília, Brazil
- Height: 1.69 m (5 ft 7 in)
- Position: Forward

Senior career*
Years	Team	Apps	(Gls)
1980–1981	Marília		
1982–1983	Guarani	1	(1)
1984	Esportivo		
1985–1986	Santa Cruz	30	(11)
1987–1990	Sporting CP	55	(8)
1988–1989	→ Estrela Amadora (loan)	34	(8)
1990–1993	Boavista	95	(27)
1994	Valladolid	10	(0)
- * Club domestic league appearances and goals

Marlon Roniel Brandão (born 1 September 1963) is a Brazilian retired footballer who played as a forward.

== Football career ==
Born in Marília, São Paulo, Brandão played for four clubs in his country, competing in the Série A with Guarani Futebol Clube and Santa Cruz Futebol Clube. In January 1987 he moved to Portugal where he remained for the following seven years, in representation of Sporting Clube de Portugal, C.F. Estrela da Amadora and Boavista FC.

Brandão's best season as a professional came in 1990–91, when he scored 11 goals in 31 games to help Boavista to the fourth position in the Primeira Liga. He retired in 1994 at only 30, after a few months with Spanish side Real Valladolid.

== Honours ==
Sporting

- Supertaça Cândido de Oliveira: 1987

Boavista

- Taça de Portugal: 1991–92
- Supertaça Cândido de Oliveira: 1992
