= António Nogueira (footballer, born 1963) =

Portuguese footballer

Personal information
- Full name: António José Nogueira dos Santos
- Date of birth: 21 September 1963 (age 63)
- Place of birth: Lisbon, Portugal
- Height: 1.90 m (6 ft 3 in)
- Position: Defender

Youth career
- 1978–1980: Boa Hora
- 1980–1982: Belenenses

Senior career*
Years	Team	Apps	(Gls)
1982–1983	Tires		
1983–1984	Vialonga		
1984–1987	Oriental	45	(3)
1987–1988	Sacavenense	26	(1)
1988–1989	Académico Viseu	34	(1)
1989–1990	Fafe	27	(1)
1990–1991	Penafiel	36	(2)
1991–1995	Boavista	117	(4)
1995–1997	Vitória Setúbal	47	(2)
Total		332	(14)

International career
1991–1994	Portugal	7	(2)
- * Club domestic league appearances and goals

António José Nogueira dos Santos (born 21 September 1963), known as Nogueira, is a Portuguese retired footballer who played mainly as a defender.

== Football career ==
Nogueira was born in Lisbon. During his professional career, which he began already in his 20s, he represented Clube Oriental de Lisboa, SG Sacavenense, Académico de Viseu FC (his first Primeira Liga experience, aged 25), AD Fafe, F.C. Penafiel, Boavista FC (his most solid period, inclusively playing in the UEFA Cup) and Vitória de Setúbal.

Nogueira retired at nearly 34, amassing Portuguese top division totals of 209 games and eight goals over the course of seven seasons. He earned seven caps for Portugal – his debut coming in 1991 – scoring twice.

António Nogueira: International goals
No.	Date	Venue	Opponent	Score	Result	Competition
1	12 October 1991	Stade Josy Barthel, Luxembourg City, Luxembourg	Luxembourg	0–1	1–1	Friendly
2	19 June 1993	Estádio do Bessa, Porto, Portugal	Malta	1–0	4–0	1994 World Cup qualification
