= Paulo Sousa (footballer, born 1967) =

Portuguese footballer

Personal information
- Full name: Paulo Jorge Ferreira de Sousa
- Date of birth: 31 March 1967 (age 59)
- Place of birth: Vila Nova de Gaia, Portugal
- Height: 1.70 m (5 ft 7 in)
- Position: Right-back

Youth career
- 1980–1981: Boavista
- 1982–1986: Canidelo

Senior career*
Years	Team	Apps	(Gls)
1986–1989	Leixões	19	(0)
1989–1990	Maia	31	(1)
1990–2000	Boavista	249	(0)
2000–2002	União Lamas	53	(1)
2002–2003	Felgueiras	31	(0)
2003–2006	União Lamas	63	(0)
2006–2007	Avintes		
Total		446	(2)

International career
1992	Portugal	3	(0)
- * Club domestic league appearances and goals

Paulo Jorge Ferreira de Sousa (born 31 March 1967 in Vila Nova de Gaia, Porto District) is a Portuguese former professional footballer who played as a right-back.
