= José Semedo (footballer, born 1965) =

Portuguese footballer

Personal information
- Full name: José Orlando Vinha Rocha Semedo
- Date of birth: 5 March 1965 (age 61)
- Place of birth: Ovar, Portugal
- Height: 1.77 m (5 ft 10 in)
- Position: Midfielder

Youth career
- 1978–1979: Esmoriz
- 1979–1980: Feirense
- 1980–1984: Porto

Senior career*
Years	Team	Apps	(Gls)
1984–1996	Porto	217	(27)
1996–1999	Salgueiros	31	(1)
Total		248	(28)

International career
1989–1994	Portugal	21	(2)
- * Club domestic league appearances and goals

José Orlando Vinha Rocha Semedo (born 5 March 1965) is a Portuguese retired footballer who played as a central midfielder.

He amassed Primeira Liga totals of 248 games and 28 goals over the course of 15 seasons, representing in the competition Porto and Salgueiros.

== Club career ==
Born in Ovar, Semedo started playing professionally for FC Porto. Although he was already part of the first-team setup during their conquest of the European Cup, he was only a fringe player (only 27 Primeira Liga appearances over four seasons), beginning to appear regularly precisely the following campaign as the club added the Intercontinental Cup and the UEFA Super Cup; domestically, 1987–88 ended with the double.

In 1994, Semedo, who was a relatively important unit in 12 of Porto's 22 accolades during his spell, suffered a severe knee injury from which he never recovered. At 31, he moved to neighbours S.C. Salgueiros, retiring from football after three years where he was sparingly used.

Semedo started coaching in 2009, being an assistant in Padroense FC's under-17. Two years later, in the same capacity, he returned to Porto's seniors, joining newly appointed Vítor Pereira's staff.

== International career ==
Semedo earned 21 caps for Portugal in five years, scoring two goals. One of those came on 31 March 1993 in a 1–1 draw in Switzerland for the 1994 FIFA World Cup qualifiers, as the national side finished third in their group, being eliminated from the final stages precisely by those opponents.

José Orlando Semedo: International goals
No.	Date	Venue	Opponent	Score	Result	Competition
1	29 March 1989	Estádio José Alvalade (1956), Lisbon, Portugal	Angola	5–0	6–0	Friendly
2	31 March 1993	Wankdorf Stadium, Bern, Switzerland	Switzerland	1–1	1–1	1994 World Cup qualification

== Honours ==
Porto

- Primeira Liga: 1984–85, 1985–86, 1987–88, 1989–90, 1991–92, 1992–93, 1994–95, 1995–96
- Taça de Portugal: 1983–84, 1987–88, 1990–91, 1993–94
- Supertaça Cândido de Oliveira: 1983, 1984, 1986, 1990, 1991, 1993, 1994
- European Cup: 1986–87
- Intercontinental Cup: 1987
- UEFA Super Cup: 1987
