= 1991–92 Primeira Divisão =

58th season of top-tier Portuguese football

Primeira Divisão
- Season: 1991–92
- Champions: Porto; 12th title
- Relegated: Torreense; Penafiel; União da Madeira
- Champions League: Porto (first round)
- Cup Winners' Cup: Boavista (first round)
- UEFA Cup: Benfica (first round); Sporting CP (first round); Vitória de Guimarães (first round)
- Matches: 306
- Goals: 692 (2.26 per match)
- Top goalscorer: Ricky (30 goals)
- Biggest home win: Torreense 8–1 Estoril (2 May 1992)
- Biggest away win: União da Madeira 1–5 Sporting CP (22 February 1992)
- Highest scoring: Torreense 8–1 Estoril (2 May 1992)

The 1991–92 Primeira Divisão was the 58th edition of top flight of Portuguese football. It started on 18 August 1991 with a match between Desp. Chaves and Estoril, and ended on 16 May 1992. The league was contested by 18 clubs with Benfica as the defending champions.

Porto qualified for the 1992–93 UEFA Champions League first round, Boavista qualified for the 1992–93 European Cup Winners' Cup first round, and Benfica, Sporting CP and Vitória de Guimarães qualified for the 1992–93 UEFA Cup first round; in opposite, Torreense, Penafiel and União da Madeira were relegated to the Liga de Honra. Ricky was the top scorer with 30 goals.

== Promotion and relegation ==
=== Teams relegated to Liga de Honra ===
- Tirsense
- Vitória de Setúbal
- Estrela da Amadora
- Belenenses
- Nacional

Tirsense, Vitória de Setúbal, Estrela da Amadora, Belenenses and Nacional were consigned to the Liga de Honra following their final classification in 1990-91 season where five teams were relegated due to the reduction of teams.

=== Teams promoted from Liga de Honra ===
- Paços de Ferreira
- Estoril
- Torreense

The other five teams were replaced by Paços de Ferreira, Estoril and Torreense from the Liga de Honra.

== Teams ==
=== Stadia and locations ===
Location of teams in Primeira Divisão 1991-92 (Mainland)
Location of teams in Primeira Divisão 1991-92 (Madeira)

Team	Head coach	City	Stadium	1990–91 finish
Beira-Mar	(Portugal) Vítor Urbano	Aveiro	Estádio Mário Duarte	6th
Benfica	(Sweden) Sven-Göran Eriksson	Lisbon	Estádio da Luz	1st
Boavista	(Portugal) Manuel José	Porto	Estádio do Bessa	4th
Braga	(Portugal) Carlos Garcia	Braga	Estádio Primeiro de Maio	11th
Chaves	(Portugal) José Romão	Chaves	Estádio Municipal de Chaves	8th
Estoril	(Portugal) Fernando Santos	Estoril	Estádio António Coimbra da Mota	2nd in Divisão de Honra
Famalicão	(Croatia) Josip Skoblar	Vila Nova de Famalicão	Estádio Municipal 22 de Junho	14th
Farense	(Spain) Paco Fortes	Faro	Estádio de São Luís	11th
Gil Vicente	(Portugal) António Oliveira	Barcelos	Estádio Adelino Ribeiro Novo	13th
Marítimo	(Brazil) Paulo Autuori	Funchal	Estádio dos Barreiros	10th
Paços de Ferreira	(Portugal) Vítor Oliveira	Paços de Ferreira	Estádio da Mata Real	1st in Divisão de Honra
Penafiel	(Portugal) Vítor Manuel	Penafiel	Estádio Municipal 25 de Abril	15th
Porto	(Brazil) Carlos Alberto Silva	Porto	Estádio das Antas	1st
Salgueiros	(Serbia and Montenegro) Zoran Filipović	Porto	Estádio Engenheiro Vidal Pinheiro	5th
Sporting	(Brazil) Marinho Peres	Lisbon	Estádio José Alvalade	3rd
Torreense	(Portugal) Manuel Cajuda	Torres Vedras	Estádio Manuel Marques	3rd in Divisão de Honra
União da Madeira	(Portugal) Rui Mâncio	Funchal	Estádio dos Barreiros	12th
Vitória de Guimarães	(Portugal) João Alves	Guimarães	Estádio D. Afonso Henriques	9th

=== Managerial changes ===
Team	Outgoing manager	Date of vacancy	Position in table	Incoming manager	Date of appointment
Braga	(Portugal) Carlos Garcia	8 December 1991	12th	(Portugal) José Manuel Gouveia	9 December 1991
Sporting	(Brazil) Marinho Peres	8 March 1992	3rd	(Portugal) Dominguez	9 March 1992
Famalicão	(Croatia) Josip Skoblar	8 March 1992	16th	(Portugal) Prof. Neca	9 March 1992
Braga	(Portugal) José Manuel Gouveia	29 March 1992	11th	(Portugal) Vítor Manuel	30 March 1992
Penafiel	(Portugal) Vítor Manuel	29 March 1992	16th	(Portugal) Henrique Calisto	30 March 1992

== League table ==
Pos	Team	Pld	W	D	L	GF	GA	GD	Pts	Qualification or relegation
1	Porto (C)	34	24	8	2	58	11	+47	56	Qualification to Champions League first round
2	Benfica	34	17	12	5	62	23	+39	46	Qualification to UEFA Cup first round
3	Boavista	34	16	12	6	45	27	+18	44	Qualification to Cup Winners' Cup first round (Note: Boavista qualified for the Cup Winners' Cup as Portuguese Cup winners)
4	Sporting CP	34	18	8	8	56	26	+30	44	Qualification to UEFA Cup first round
5	Vitória de Guimarães	34	14	13	7	46	35	+11	41	Qualification to UEFA Cup first round
6	Farense	34	12	11	11	35	33	+2	35	
7	Marítimo	34	12	11	11	40	38	+2	35	
8	Beira-Mar	34	11	10	13	32	41	−9	32	
9	Chaves	34	10	10	14	36	45	−9	30	
10	Estoril	34	10	10	14	34	54	−20	30	
11	Braga	34	12	5	17	41	49	−8	29	
12	Paços de Ferreira	34	10	9	15	31	45	−14	29	
13	Gil Vicente	34	11	7	16	26	42	−16	29	
14	Famalicão	34	9	10	15	27	40	−13	28	
15	Salgueiros	34	7	14	13	27	35	−8	28	
16	Torreense (R)	34	8	11	15	36	43	−7	27	Relegation to Segunda Divisão de Honra
17	Penafiel (R)	34	7	11	16	30	47	−17	25	Relegation to Segunda Divisão de Honra
18	União da Madeira (R)	34	9	6	19	30	58	−28	24	Relegation to Segunda Divisão de Honra

Source: Primeira Divisão
Rules for classification: 1st points, 2nd head-to-head, 3rd goals average
(C) Champions; (R) Relegated

== Results ==
Home \ Away	BEM	BEN	BOA	BRA	CHA	ESP	FAM	FAR	GVI	MAR	PAÇ	PEN	POR	SAL	SCP	SCT	UNI	VGU
Beira-Mar		2–1	2–1	1–0	1–0	1–0	0–0	1–0	0–0	1–4	3–0	2–1	0–1	1–1	1–0	1–0	2–0	1–2
Benfica	3–0		0–1	2–0	4–1	2–2	2–1	1–1	5–0	2–0	4–0	1–1	2–3	1–1	2–0	0–0	6–0	2–0
Boavista	3–2	1–0		2–1	4–4	5–0	1–0	2–0	1–0	1–0	3–0	3–0	0–0	2–0	2–1	1–1	3–0	1–1
Braga	2–1	0–2	1–2		3–1	1–3	1–0	4–1	2–1	2–0	3–1	1–2	0–0	0–0	1–1	2–1	1–2	2–1
Chaves	3–0	1–0	3–0	1–2		1–0	2–0	0–0	1–1	2–1	1–1	1–0	0–1	2–0	1–1	4–1	0–2	1–1
Estoril Praia	1–0	0–2	0–0	1–0	1–1		2–1	3–1	0–1	1–1	3–1	2–1	0–2	0–2	1–1	0–0	2–1	2–0
Famalicão	1–1	0–0	0–0	3–1	1–0	2–1		0–1	2–0	2–2	1–0	1–1	0–1	2–1	0–0	2–0	2–0	1–4
Farense	0–0	2–2	0–0	3–1	1–1	2–0	1–0		1–0	3–1	1–0	4–1	0–0	1–1	0–2	1–0	1–0	3–0
Gil Vicente	2–0	0–1	1–3	2–3	1–0	1–1	2–0	0–0		1–1	1–2	2–0	1–0	1–0	0–3	2–1	2–1	0–2
Marítimo	0–0	0–4	0–0	0–0	1–0	0–0	3–1	1–1	4–0		1–0	2–0	1–0	1–1	1–0	1–0	3–1	3–1
Paços de Ferreira	1–1	1–1	1–1	2–1	3–0	1–2	0–1	1–0	0–1	2–1		2–1	0–3	2–1	1–0	1–1	3–0	1–1
Penafiel	2–2	2–2	0–0	2–1	1–0	4–3	1–1	1–0	0–0	0–1	0–0		0–2	2–0	0–2	1–0	1–1	0–1
Porto	4–1	0–0	2–0	2–0	4–1	5–0	1–0	2–0	1–0	3–1	2–0	2–1		2–0	0–0	5–0	3–0	1–0
Salgueiros	1–1	1–1	1–1	3–0	1–1	3–0	0–0	2–1	1–0	1–0	0–0	1–1	0–1		1–1	1–1	1–0	0–1
Sporting CP	3–1	0–0	1–1	4–2	3–0	1–0	3–0	2–1	2–0	2–1	2–1	3–1	0–2	3–0		4–0	3–0	0–1
Torreense	1–0	1–3	1–0	0–0	0–1	8–1	6–1	1–1	0–2	2–2	2–0	1–0	0–0	2–0	1–2		2–0	1–1
União da Madeira	2–1	0–1	2–0	0–2	1–1	1–1	1–0	0–2	4–1	1–1	1–2	1–0	2–2	2–1	1–5	2–0		0–2
Vitória de Guimarães	1–1	1–3	2–0	2–1	4–0	1–1	1–1	3–1	0–0	3–1	1–1	2–2	1–1	1–0	2–1	1–1	1–1	

Source: Foradejogo (in Portuguese)
Legend: Blue = home team win; Yellow = draw; Red = away team win.

== Top goalscorers ==
Rank	Player	Club	Goals
1	(Nigeria) Ricky	Boavista	30
2	(Portugal) Jorge Cadete	Sporting	25
3	(Tunisia) Ziad Tlemçani	Vitória de Guimarães	15
3	(Mozambique) Chiquinho Conde	Braga	15
5	(Brazil) Isaías	Benfica	12
6	(Algeria) Djamel Menad	Famalicão	11
6	(Portugal) Rosário	Torreense	11
8	(Bulgaria) Nikola Spasov	Paços de Ferreira	10
8	(Brazil) Edmilson	Marítimo	10
8	(Croatia) Tihomir Rudež	Chaves	10
8	(Bulgaria) Emil Kostadinov	Porto	10

Source: Foradejogo

== Attendances ==
#	Club	Average
1	Porto	30,824
2	Sporting	29,941
3	Benfica	29,647
4	Vitória SC	13,176
5	Beira-Mar	11,118
6	Boavista	9,471
7	Braga	9,176
8	Estoril Praia	8,735
9	Farense	8,588
10	Torreense	8,471
11	Famalicão	8,265
12	Paços de Ferreira	7,824
13	Marítimo	7,471
14	Gil Vicente	7,059
15	Chaves	5,706
16	Salgueiros	5,088
17	Penafiel	5,029
18	CF União	1,894
