= Ricky Owubokiri =

Nigerian footballer

Ricky
Personal information
- Full name: Richard Daddy Owubokiri
- Date of birth: 16 July 1961 (age 65)
- Place of birth: Port Harcourt, Nigeria
- Height: 1.83 m (6 ft 0 in)
- Position: Striker

Senior career*
Years	Team	Apps	(Gls)
1978–1980	Sharks	?	(23)
1981–1982	ACB Lagos		
1983	América-RJ		
1984–1986	Vitória		
1986–1987	Laval	36	(10)
1987–1988	Metz	33	(8)
1988–1989	Benfica	4	(0)
1989–1991	Estrela Amadora	68	(28)
1991–1994	Boavista	92	(50)
1994	Vitória	9	(2)
1994–1995	Belenenses	8	(1)
1995–1996	Al-Arabi	?	(16)
1996–1997	Al-Hilal		

International career
1982–1992	Nigeria	23	(1)
- * Club domestic league appearances and goals

Richard Daddy Owubokiri (born 16 July 1961), commonly known as Ricky, is a Nigerian former professional footballer who played as a striker.

== Career ==
Born in Port Harcourt, Rivers State, Ricky started his career in his native country before playing four seasons in Brazil, where he played for America Football Club (RJ) and Esporte Clube Vitória, a club he would return to in 1994 in the Brazilian Série A. He had a spell in France with Stade Lavallois and FC Metz.

Ricky moved to Portugal to play for S.L. Benfica, in December 1988, but appeared very rarely with the team in the 1988–89 season, scoring only six goals, all in the same Portuguese Cup fixture against Atlético Riachense. He moved to C.F. Estrela da Amadora, where he played in the 1989–90 and 1990–91 seasons, winning the Taça de Portugal in 1990. He then moved north to Boavista FC, for the 1991–92 season. His impact was instant, helping the side finish third in his first season with the addition of the Taça de Portugal, as the player netted 30 times in the Primeira Liga, being the top scorer.

Ricky retired in 1997 at the age of 36, after one-year stints with C.F. Os Belenenses, Al-Arabi Sports Club and Al-Hilal FC.

He had 23 caps for Nigeria, scoring a single goal. Owubokiri was picked for the 1982 African Cup of Nations in Libya, but missed the 1994 FIFA World Cup.

== Career statistics ==
#	Date	Venue	Opponent	Score	Result	Competition
1.	10 October 1992	Surulere Stadium, Lagos, Nigeria	South Africa	4–0	Win	1994 FIFA World Cup qualifying
