= 1994–95 S.L. Benfica season =

Benfica
1994–95 season
- President: Manuel Damásio
- Head coach: Artur Jorge
- Stadium: Estádio da Luz
- Primeira Divisão: 3rd
- Taça de Portugal: Quarter-finals
- Supertaça Cândido de Oliveira: Runners-up
- UEFA Champions League: Quarter-finals
- Top goalscorer: League: Isaías (14); All: Edílson (17)
- Highest home attendance: 60,000 vs Porto (2 October 1994)
- Lowest home attendance: 10,000 vs Marinhense (4 December 1994)
Home colours

The 1994–95 European football season was the 91st season of Sport Lisboa e Benfica's existence and the club's 61st consecutive season in both Portuguese football and UEFA competitions. The season ran from 1 July 1994 to 30 June 1995; Benfica competed domestically in the Primeira Divisão and the Taça de Portugal. The club also participated in the UEFA Champions League as a result of winning the previous league.

After winning their latest title, Benfica made significant changes to its squad and management. It sacked Toni and replaced him with Artur Jorge. In the transfer market, the club was far more active than the past seasons. It signed over a dozen players with Michel Preud'homme, Dimas Teixeira and Paulo Bento becoming regulars. They were joined by two loans, Claudio Caniggia and Edílson, both would be the top-scorers of the team. In the departures, fan favourites like Rui Costa or Schwarz were sold, while others like Rui Àguas, Kulkov, Silvino and Hernâni Neves were released.

On the pitch, Benfica started the season by losing the 1993 Supertaça to Porto. In the Primeira Divisão, they started winning, but quickly lost their plot. In the Champions League, Jorge led Benfica to the knockout stage after coming first in their group. As the season progress, Benfica performance stabilised and starting early December, they rack up over ten wins in a row. This allowed them to close distances to leader Porto, and progress to the quarter-finals of the Portuguese Cup.

In late February, in the decisive stage of the season, Benfica slipped again in the Primeira Divisão, and were eliminated in the other competitions. Til the end, Benfica could only win about half of their remaining fourteen match-days, finishing in third place, 15 points behind Porto. In their last match of the season, they lost another Supertaça to Porto.

== Season summary ==
In the post-season of a title winning year, Benfica made the surprise choice of releasing Toni, who had been closely associated with the managerial position since assuming the assistant position to Sven-Göran Eriksson in 1982. To replace him, the club chose Artur Jorge. The Portuguese manager was known for the eight titles won at FC Porto, notoriously, the 1986–87 European Cup, plus had just led Paris Saint-Germain to their second league title in history, in the past season. With the club still in financial despair, they were forced to sell important players to gather funds. Rising star, Rui Costa was sold to Fiorentina, reportedly because they offer more money than Barcelona. Schwarz joined Arsenal for 1.8 million pounds, and others left the club, either for disciplinary reasons as with Kulkov and Yuran, or old age, like Rui Àguas.

The club sought reinforcements mostly indoors, like Paulo Bento and Dimas, with a few arriving from abroad, with Preud'Homme and Caniggia gathering the most expectations. The season began with the replay match of the 1993 Supertaça Cândido de Oliveira, ending in another loss on the penalty shoot-out, similar to the 1991 edition. On the league campaign, the situation was better, as Benfica racked up three straight wins; however a loss against União de Leiria on 18 September, put the team behind on the title race by two points.

"As title-holders, Benfica transform themselves in three months, and for the worst. The new board led by Damásio sacks Toni, the title winning manager and sells Rui Costa and Schwarz. From the many alternatives put at the disposal of Artur Jorge and his assistant, Zoran Filipović, only three work: Preud'Homme, Dimas and Paulo Bento. Edílson, Stanić and Caniggia show some talent, offsetting the flops, Tavares and Nelo. Conclusion: third place in the league, without winning over either Porto, or Sporting – even losing both games against Sporting, something that only happened three times before, in 1939–40, 1952–53 and 1953–54. As an end note, double elimination on the quarter-finals: by Vitória de Setúbal on the Portuguese Cup and by AC Milan on the Champions League. In the Supercup, Porto lift the trophy in Paris."

— Rui Miguel Tovar on the season events

Benfica could not regain any point back over October, ending the month with a four points disadvantage to leader Sporting. Although the domestically, the season was not going according to the club best hopes; in Europe, the track record was much better, with a spot on the next phase secured with one match to spare. Already approaching New Year, the odds in the renewing the title race were further diminished, with a loss in Alvalade expanding the gap to the leader by a point.

The first months of 1995 were the teams best throughout the season, as they reduced the distance to the league leader, Porto, to only three points by Match-day 20 after an eight-game winning streak. However, in the next two months, at the deciding part of the season, the club dropped more points to Leiria, and then lost four times in six games, re-opening the gap to Porto to twelve points, finishing any hope of renewing the title. In the other competitions, the prospect was the same, Benfica was knock-out of the Champions League by A.C. Milan, and on the Taça de Portugal, by Vitória Setúbal.

The final games of the season were only spent securing a place in the next year European competitions, having the bitter taste of losing both games against Sporting, for a fourth time in history, the first since 1954. The Lisbon derby on the 30 of April was also controversial because of the irregular dismissal of Caniggia by referee Jorge Coroado; causing the match to be repeated on 14 July (2–0 win for Benfica), and then annulled on FIFA order. After finishing the league fifteen points behind them, as they regained the title back, Benfica met Porto on the replay of the 1994 Supertaça Cândido de Oliveira in Paris, which was left unresolved from early in the season. The northerners won one-nil and took home their eight Supertaça Cândido de Oliveira.

== Competitions ==
Win Draw Loss Postponed

=== Overall record ===
Competition	First match	Last match	Record								
Competition	First match	Last match	G	W	D	L	GF	GA	GD	Win %	Source
Primeira Divisão	21 August 1994	28 May 1995	34	21	5	8	60	30	+30	61.76	
Taça de Portugal	4 December 1994	12 April 1995	5	3	1	1	18	3	+15	60.00	
UEFA Champions League	14 September 1994	15 March 1995	8	3	4	1	9	7	+2	37.50	
Supertaça	17 August 1994	20 June 1995	4	0	3	1	1	3	−2	0.00	
Total			51	27	13	11	90	44	+46	52.94	

=== Supertaça Cândido de Oliveira ===
==== 1993 Edition ====
17 August 1994 Replay	Benfica	2–2 (a.e.t.) (3–4 p)	Porto	Estádio Municipal de Coimbra, Coimbra
	Tavares 89'; Brito 118'		Domingos 85'; Secretário 95'	Referee: Veiga Trigo (Beja)
	Penalties
	Hélder (penalty scored); Daniel Kenedy (penalty missed); Abel Xavier (penalty scored); Paulo Madeira (penalty scored); William (penalty missed)		(penalty missed) João Domingos Pinto; (penalty scored) Zé Carlos; (penalty scored) Rui Filipe; (penalty scored) Paulinho Santos; (penalty scored) Drulović

==== 1994 Edition ====
24 August 1994 First leg	Benfica	1–1	Porto	Lisbon
20:00	Vítor Paneira 75'	Report	Rui Filipe 72'	Stadium: Estádio da Luz; Attendance: 50,000; Referee: Carlos Calheiros

21 September 1994 Second leg	Porto	0–0	Benfica	Porto
20:30		Report		Stadium: Estádio das Antas; Attendance: 40,000; Referee: Donato Ramos

20 June 1995 Replay	Porto	1–0	Benfica	Paris
20:30	Domingos 51'	Report		Stadium: Parc des Princes; Attendance: 48,000; Referee: Lucílio Baptista

=== Primeira Divisão ===
==== League table ====
Pos	Team	Pld	W	D	L	GF	GA	GD	Pts	Qualification or relegation
1	Porto (C)	34	29	4	1	73	15	+58	62	Qualification to Champions League group stage
2	Sporting CP	34	23	9	2	59	21	+38	55	Qualification to Cup Winners' Cup first round (Note: Sporting qualified for the Cup Winners' Cup as Portuguese Cup winners)
3	Benfica	34	21	5	8	61	28	+33	47	Qualification to UEFA Cup first round
4	Vitória de Guimarães	34	16	10	8	54	43	+11	42	Qualification to UEFA Cup first round
5	Farense	34	16	5	13	44	38	+6	37	Qualification to UEFA Cup first round

Source: Primeira Divisão
Rules for classification: 1st points, 2nd head-to-head, 3rd goals average
(C) Champions

==== Results by round ====
Round	1	2	3	4	5	6	7	8	9	10	11	12	13	14	15	16	17	18	19	20	21	22	23	24	25	26	27	28	29	30	31	32	33	34
Ground	H	A	H	A	A	H	A	H	A	H	A	H	A	H	A	H	A	A	H	A	H	H	A	H	A	H	A	H	A	H	A	H	A	H
Result	W	W	W	L	W	D	L	W	W	W	D	W	L	W	W	W	W	W	W	W	D	W	L	L	W	L	L	W	D	L	W	W	W	D
Position	1	3	3	3	3	3	3	3	3	3	3	3	3	3	3	3	3	3	3	3	3	3	3	3	3	3	3	3	3	3	3	3	3	3

Source: ForaDeJogo
A = Away; H = Home; W = Win; D = Draw; L = Loss

==== Matches ====
21 August 1994 1	Benfica	2–0	Beira Mar	Torres Novas
19:45	Vítor Paneira 58'; Clóvis 90'	Report		Stadium: Estádio Municipal Dr. Alves Vieira; Attendance: 20,000; Referee: Bento Marques

28 August 1994 2	União da Madeira	0–2	Benfica	Funchal
20:00		Report	Isaías 55'; Caniggia 70' (pen.)	Stadium: Estádio dos Barreiros; Attendance: 8,000; Referee: Lucílio Batista

10 September 1994 3	Benfica	1–0	Vitória Setúbal	Lisbon
19:45	Vítor Paneira 25'	Report		Stadium: Estádio da Luz; Attendance: 30,000; Referee: Soares Dias

18 September 1994 4	União de Leiria	1–0	Benfica	Leiria
20:30	Luís Miguel 79'	Report		Stadium: Estádio Dr. Magalhães Pessoa; Attendance: 10,000; Referee: José Pratas

24 September 1994 5	Maritimo	Postponed	Benfica	Funchal
		Report		Stadium: Estádio dos Barreiros

2 October 1994 6	Benfica	1–1	Porto	Lisbon
20:00	Isaías 89'	Report	Yuran 66'	Stadium: Estádio da Luz; Attendance: 60,000; Referee: Bento Marques

15 October 1994 7	Gil Vicente	1–0	Benfica	Braga
20:15	Tuck 90' (pen.)	Report		Stadium: Estádio 1º de Maio; Attendance: 10,000; Referee: João Mesquita

23 October 1994 8	Benfica	5–0	Desp. Chaves	Lisbon
20:00	Isaías 6', 16'; João Pinto 51'; Amaral 67'; Kenedy 83'	Report		Stadium: Estádio da Luz; Attendance: 25,000; Referee: Veiga Trigo

30 October 1994 9	Vitória Guimarães	1–3	Benfica	Guimarães
19:00	Dane Kuprešanin 88'	Report	Isaías 6'; Caniggia 77', 83'	Stadium: Estádio D. Afonso Henriques; Attendance: 5,000; Referee: Lucílio Baptista

6 November 1994 10	Benfica	2–1	Farense	Lisbon
20:00	Isaías 87'; Abel Xavier 89' (pen.)	Report	Tozé 51'	Stadium: Estádio da Luz; Attendance: 30,000; Referee: Paulo Costa

19 November 1994 11	Belenenses	1–1	Benfica	Lisbon
21:00	Abílio 29'	Report	Isaías 69'	Stadium: Estádio do Restelo; Attendance: 3,000; Referee: Pinto Correia

27 November 1994 12	Benfica	3–1	Estrela da Amadora	Lisbon
18:15	Hélder 30', 55'; Abel Xavier 50'	Report	Fernando 81'; Rebelo (red card) 49'	Stadium: Estádio da Luz; Attendance: 35,000; Referee: Vítor Reis

1 December 1994 13	Sporting	1–0	Benfica	Lisbon
21:00	Emmanuel Amuneke 56'	Report		Stadium: Estádio de Alvalade; Attendance: 50,000; Referee: António Marçal

11 December 1994 14	Benfica	4–1	Boavista	Lisbon
20:00	Edílson 1'; Caniggia 14'; Tavares 49'; João Pinto 87'	Report	Sánchez 25'	Stadium: Estádio da Luz; Attendance: 45,000; Referee: António Rola

30 December 1994 15	Salgueiros	1–2	Benfica	Porto
20:45	Chico Fonseca 88'	Report	Dimas 22'; Hélder 23'	Stadium: Estádio Prof. Dr. José Vieira de Carvalho; Attendance: 5,000; Referee: José Pratas

4 January 1995 5	Maritimo	0–3	Benfica	Funchal
19:00		Report	Kenedy 15'; Isaías 23'; Edílson 65'	Stadium: Estádio dos Barreiros; Attendance: 8,000; Referee: Joao Mesquita

8 January 1995 16	Benfica	1–0	Tirsense	Torres Novas
19:30	Tavares 80'	Report		Stadium: Estádio Municipal Dr. Alves Vieira; Attendance: 25,000; Referee: Donato Ramos

14 January 1995 17	Braga	0–2	Benfica	Braga
19:45		Report	Isaías 62'; Caniggia 71'	Stadium: Estádio 1º de Maio; Attendance: 10,000; Referee: Lucílio Baptista

21 January 1995 18	Beira-Mar	1–2	Benfica	Aveiro
19:00	Costa 41'	Report	Stanić 60'; Isaías 77'	Stadium: Estádio Mário Duarte; Attendance: 4,000; Referee: Paulo Paraty

5 February 1995 19	Benfica	3–1	União da Madeira	Braga
19:00	Vítor Paneira 41'; Isaías 61', 89'	Report	Manú 76'	Stadium: Estádio 1º de Maio; Attendance: 25,000; Referee: Monteiro da Silva

12 February 1995 20	Vitória Setúbal	1–2	Benfica	Setúbal
19:00	Paulão 89'	Report	Paulo Pereira 40'; Abel Xavier 59'	Stadium: Estádio do Bonfim; Attendance: 5,000; Referee: Carlos Calheiros

19 February 1995 21	Benfica	1–1	União de Leiria	Lisbon
19:45	Paulo Pereira 28' (pen.)	Report	Fua 89'	Stadium: Estádio da Luz; Attendance: 50,000; Referee: Miranda dos Santos

25 February 1995 22	Benfica	3–0	Maritimo	Lisbon
17:00	João Pinto 4'; Caniggia 21', 82'	Report		Stadium: Estádio da Luz; Attendance: 15,000; Referee: João Mesquita

5 March 1995 23	Porto	2–1	Benfica	Porto
20:30	Zé Carlos 7'; Drulović 75'	Report	João Pinto 38'	Stadium: Estádio das Antas; Attendance: 40,000; Referee: José Pratas

11 March 1995 24	Benfica	0–1	Gil Vicente	Lisbon
18:00		Report	Makpoloka Mangonga 59'	Stadium: Estádio da Luz; Attendance: 10,000; Referee: José Leirós

19 March 1995 25	Desp. Chaves	0–1	Benfica	Chaves
19:15		Report	Edílson 69'	Stadium: Estádio Municipal de Chaves; Attendance: 6,000; Referee: Paulo Paraty

26 March 1995 26	Benfica	1–3	Vitória Guimarães	Lisbon
20:30	Edílson 23'	Report	Quim Berto 5'; Gilmar 45'; José Carlos 64'	Stadium: Estádio da Luz; Attendance: 20,000; Referee: Carlos Calheiros

1 April 1995 27	Farense	4–1	Benfica	Faro
19:45	Jorge Soares 25'; Hassan 80'; Ndao 70', 88'	Report	Edílson 28'	Stadium: Estádio de São Luís; Attendance: 14,000; Referee: António Rola

7 April 1995 28	Benfica	2–1	Belenenses	Lisbon
20:00	Mauro Airez 6' (o.g.); Isaías 19'	Report	Mauro Airez 77'	Stadium: Estádio da Luz; Attendance: 15,000; Referee: Vítor Pereira

15 April 1995 29	Estrela da Amadora	0–0	Benfica	Lisbon
19:00		Report		Stadium: Estádio da Reboleira; Attendance: 4,000; Referee: Bento Marques

30 April 1995 30	Benfica	1–2	Sporting	Lisbon
20:00	Dimas 22'	Report	Balakov 10'; Yordanov 13'	Stadium: Estádio da Luz; Attendance: 40,000; Referee: Jorge Coroado

6 May 1995 31	Boavista	1–3	Benfica	Porto
20:00	Artur 86'	Report	Stanić 54', 84'; Isaías 57'	Stadium: Estádio do Bessa; Attendance: 10,000; Referee: José Pratas

14 May 1995 32	Benfica	3–0	Salgueiros	Lisbon
19:45	Caniggia 34'; Stanić 45'; Edílson 90'	Report		Stadium: Estádio da Luz; Attendance: 25,000; Referee: Mário Leal

21 May 1995 33	Tirsense	1–3	Benfica	Santo Tirso
19:45	Marcelo 89'	Report	Edílson 45', 69'; Stanić 60'	Stadium: Abel Alves de Figueiredo; Attendance: 15,000; Referee: Juvenal Silvestre

28 May 1995 34	Benfica	1–1	Braga	Lisbon
19:00	Edílson 89'	Report	Baltasar 17'	Stadium: Estádio da Luz; Attendance: 15,000; Referee: José Rufino

=== Taça de Portugal ===
4 December 1994 Fourth Rd	Benfica	12–0	Marinhense	Lisbon
18:00	Tavares 13'; Edílson 18', 30', 38', 51'; Caniggia 28', 31', 53'; Vítor Paneira 40' (pen.); João Pinto 64'; Pedro Henriques 67'; Kenedy 80'	Report		Stadium: Estádio da Luz; Attendance: 10,000; Referee: Carvalhal Araújo

22 January 1996 Fifth Rd	Benfica	3–0	Tirsense	Lisbon
19:45	Caniggia 7', 84'; Edílson 25'	Report		Stadium: Estádio da Luz; Attendance: 22,000; Referee: Juvenal Silvestre

15 February 1995 Sixth Rd	Benfica	3–1	Famalicão	Lisbon
20:30	Edílson 4', 74'; Tavares 5'	Report	Serge Honi 78'	Stadium: Estádio da Luz; Attendance: 15,000; Referee: Andrelino Pena

29 March 1995 Quarter-finals	Benfica	0–0 (a.e.t.)	Vitória Setúbal	Lisbon
20:30		Report		Stadium: Estádio da Luz; Attendance: 33,000; Referee: José Rufino

12 April 1995 QF Replay	Vitória Setúbal	2–0	Benfica	Setúbal
20:30	Sérgio Araújo 66', 88'; Quim (yellow card) 43' (yellow-red card) 77'	Report	Dimas (yellow card) 55' (yellow-red card) 78'; Paneira (yellow card) (yellow-red card) 68'	Stadium: Estádio do Bonfim; Attendance: 15,000; Referee: Lourenço Ferreira

=== UEFA Champions League ===
==== Group stage ====
===== Group C =====
Pos	Team	Pld	W	D	L	GF	GA	GD	Pts	Qualification
1	(Portugal) Benfica	6	3	3	0	9	5	+4	9	Advance to knockout stage
2	(Croatia) Hajduk Split	6	2	2	2	5	7	−2	6	Advance to knockout stage
3	(Romania) Steaua București	6	1	3	2	7	6	+1	5	
4	(Belgium) Anderlecht	6	0	4	2	4	7	−3	4	

Source: UEFA

14 September 1994 1	Hajduk Split (Croatia)	0–0	(Portugal) Benfica	Poljud, Split
20:30		Report MatchCentre		Attendance: 26,000; Referee: Serge Muhmenthaler (Switzerland)

28 September 1994 2	Benfica (Portugal)	3–1	(Belgium) Anderlecht	Estádio da Luz, Lisbon
19:30	Caniggia 26', 40'; Tavares 72'	Report MatchCentre	Paulo Madeira 88' (o.g.)	Attendance: 32,000; Referee: Vadim Zhuk (Belarus)

19 October 1994 3	Benfica (Portugal)	2–1	(Romania) Steaua București	Estádio da Luz, Lisbon
19:30	Caniggia 44' (pen.); João Pinto 60'	Report MatchCentre	Militaru 89'	Attendance: 35,000; Referee: David Elleray (England)

2 November 1994 4	Steaua București (Romania)	1–1	(Portugal) Benfica	Stadionul Ghencea, Bucharest
21:30	Panduru 27'	Report MatchCentre	Hélder 63'	Attendance: 17,000; Referee: Leif Sundell (Sweden)

23 November 1994 5	Benfica (Portugal)	2–1	(Croatia) Hajduk Split	Estádio da Luz, Lisbon
19:30	Isaías 32'; João Pinto 76'	Report MatchCentre	Andrijašević 71'	Attendance: 31,000; Referee: John Blankenstein (Netherlands)

7 December 1994 6	Anderlecht (Belgium)	1–1	(Portugal) Benfica	Constant Vanden Stock Stadium, Brussels
20:30	Rutjes 48'	Report MatchCentre	Edilson 82'	Attendance: 20,000; Referee: Marc Batta (France)

==== Knockout stage ====
===== Quarter-finals =====
1 March 1995 First leg	Milan (Italy)	2–0	(Portugal) Benfica	San Siro, Milan
21:00	Simone 63', 75'	Report MatchCentre		Attendance: 60,000; Referee: Ahmet Çakar (Turkey)

15 March 1995 Second leg	Benfica (Portugal)	0–0 (2–0 agg.)	(Italy) Milan	Estádio da Luz, Lisbon
20:15		Report MatchCentre		Attendance: 60,000; Referee: Guy Goethals (Belgium)

=== Friendlies ===
5 August 1994 Parmalat Cup	Peñarol	1–0	Benfica	São Paulo
				Stadium: Ibirapuera Park

5 August 1994 Parmalat Cup	Juventude	1–1 (5–4 p)	Benfica	São Paulo
				Stadium: Ibirapuera Park

7 August 1994 Parmalat Cup	Benfica	3–0	Audax Italiano	São Paulo
				Stadium: Parque Antártica

7 August 1994 Parmalat Cup	Juventude	4–0	Benfica	São Paulo
				Stadium: Parque Antártica

== Player statistics ==
The squad for the season consisted of the players listed in the tables below, as well as staff member Artur Jorge(manager) and Zoran Filipovic (assistant manager)

Note 1: Note: Flags indicate national team as defined under FIFA eligibility rules. Players may hold more than one non-FIFA nationality.

Note 2: Players with squad numbers marked ‡ joined the club during the 1994–95 season via transfer, with more details in the following section.

No.	Pos	Nat	Player	Total		Primeira Liga		Taça de Portugal		UEFA Champions League		Supertaça	
No.	Pos	Nat	Player	Apps	Goals	Apps	Goals	Apps	Goals	Apps	Goals	Apps	Goals
1^{‡}	GK	(Belgium) BEL	Michel Preud'homme	47	-41	31	-28	5	-3	8	-7	3	-3
2	DF	(Portugal) POR	António Veloso	37	0	25	0	2	0	7	0	3	0
2^{‡}	DF	(Brazil) BRA	Paulo Pereira	18	1	13	1	3	0	1	0	1	0
3	DF	(Portugal) POR	Hélder Cristóvão	33	4	21	3	2	0	7	1	3	0
4	DF	(Brazil) BRA	William	19	0	13	0	2	0	3	0	1	0
5	DF	(Brazil) BRA	Carlos Mozer	23	0	17	0	2	0	4	0	0	0
5	DF	(Portugal) POR	Paulo Madeira	28	0	17	0	4	0	3	0	4	0
6	DF	(Portugal) POR	Abel Xavier	33	3	22	3	2	0	5	0	4	0
6^{‡}	MF	(Portugal) POR	Paulo Bento	29	0	20	0	5	0	3	0	1	0
6^{‡}	MF	(Portugal) POR	José Tavares	34	6	20	2	3	2	7	1	4	1
7^{‡}	MF	(Portugal) POR	Amaral	14	1	11	1	2	0	0	0	1	0
7	MF	(Portugal) POR	Vítor Paneira	38	5	24	3	4	1	8	0	2	1
8	MF	(Portugal) POR	João Vieira Pinto	39	6	24	4	5	1	7	1	3	0
9^{‡}	FW	(Brazil) BRA	Edílson	31	17	23	9	5	7	2	1	1	0
9^{‡}	FW	(Argentina) ARG	Claudio Caniggia	34	16	24	8	3	5	7	3	0	0
10^{‡}	MF	(Portugal) POR	Nelo	36	0	23	0	3	0	7	0	3	0
11	MF	(Brazil) BRA	Isaías	33	15	23	14	1	0	7	1	2	0
11	FW	(Portugal) POR	César Brito	11	1	6	0	0	0	2	0	3	1
12	GK	(Portugal) POR	Neno	5	-3	4	-2	0	0	0	0	1	-1
13^{‡}	DF	(Portugal) POR	Dimas Teixeira	45	0	30	0	4	0	8	0	3	0
15^{‡}	MF	(Croatia) CRO	Mario Stanić	15	5	13	5	1	0	0	0	1	0
16^{‡}	FW	(Brazil) BRA	Clóvis	2	1	1	1	0	0	0	0	1	0
17	DF	(Portugal) POR	Pedro Henriques	1	0	0	0	1	0	0	0	0	0
18	FW	(Portugal) POR	Edgar Pacheco	1	0	0	0	0	0	0	0	1	0
19^{‡}	MF	(Portugal) POR	Rui Esteves	2	0	2	0	0	0	0	0	0	0
22	DF	(Portugal) POR	Daniel Kenedy	35	3	22	2	4	1	6	0	3	0
24^{‡}	FW	(Angola) ANG	Akwá	3	0	2	0	0	0	0	0	1	0
25^{‡}	DF	(Brazil) BRA	Paulão	7	1	4	1	1	0	2	0	0	0

== Transfers ==
=== In ===
Entry date	Position	Player	From club
July 1994	GK	Michel Preud'homme	Mechelen
July 1994	LB	Dimas Teixeira	Vitória Guimarães
July 1994	DM	Paulo Bento	Vitória Guimarães
July 1994	CM	José Tavares	Boavista
July 1994	CM	Nelo	Boavista
July 1994	CB	Paulo Madeira	Marítimo
July 1994	RW	Amaral	Sporting
July 1994	AM	Mario Stanić	Sporting Gijón
July 1994	CM	Rui Esteves	Vitória Setúbal
July 1994	CB	Paulão	Grêmio
July 1994	FW	Akwá	Nacional de Benguela
August 1994	ST	Clóvis	Guarani
January 1995	CB	Paulo Pereira	Porto

=== In by loan ===
Entry date	Position	Player	From club	Return date
July 1994	ST	Claudio Caniggia	Roma	30 June 1995
July 1994	ST	Edílson	Palmeiras	30 June 1995

=== Out ===
Exit date	Position	Player	To club
July 1994	GK	Pedro Roma	Académica
July 1994	GK	Paulo Santos	Penafiel
July 1994	CB	Jovo Simanić	Boavista
July 1994	CB	Nuno Afonso	Belenenses
July 1994	AM	Aleksandr Mostovoi	Strasbourg
July 1994	LB	Stefan Schwarz	Arsenal
July 1994	AM	Rui Costa	Fiorentina
July 1994	ST	Rui Àguas	Estrela Amadora
July 1994	DM	Vasili Kulkov	Porto
July 1994	ST	Sergei Yuran	Porto
July 1994	GK	Silvino Louro	Vitória Setúbal
July 1994	CM	Hernâni Neves	Vitória Setúbal
July 1994	RB	Abel Silva	Vitória Setúbal
August 1994	ST	Clóvis	Vitória Setúbal

=== Out by loan ===
Exit date	Position	Player	To club	Return date
July 1994	ST	Aílton Delfino	São Paulo	30 June 1995
January 95	CM	Rui Esteves	Birmingham City	30 June 1995
