= 1992–93 S.L. Benfica season =

Benfica
1992–93 season
- President: Jorge de Brito
- Head coach: Tomislav Ivić (until 25 October 1992); Toni
- Stadium: Estádio da Luz
- Primeira Divisão: 2nd
- Taça de Portugal: Winners
- Supertaça Cândido de Oliveira: Runners-up
- UEFA Cup: Quarter-finals
- Top goalscorer: League: Isaías (9); All: Isaías (17)
- Highest home attendance: 90,000 vs Porto (27 January 1993)
- Lowest home attendance: 20,000 vs Amora (3 February 1993)
Home colours

The 1992–93 season was Sport Lisboa e Benfica's 89th season in existence and the club's 59th consecutive season in the top flight of Portuguese football, covering the period from 1 July 1992 to 30 June 1993. Benfica competed domestically in the Primeira Divisão and the Taça de Portugal, and participated in the UEFA Cup by finishing second in the previous season.

This season was the first after the departure of Sven-Göran Eriksson, with Tomislav Ivić succeeding the Swedish coach for a brief spell before former manager Toni took over until the end of the season. In the transfer market, the club look into strengthening their defence, after conceding 23 goals in the league in the year before, with regular starters being brought in, notably the cases of Abel Xavier, Hélder and Carlos Mozer. Also with strikers like Rui Águas and Sergei Yuran, players that could play in the hole were needed, so João Pinto and Aleksandr Mostovoi were signed. Benfica finished the league in the second place, two points behind defending champions Porto – against whom they also lost the 1991 Supertaça in a replay final – but secured a record 22nd Taça de Portugal title.

== Season summary ==
Swedish manager Sven-Göran Eriksson left the club after three seasons, following a trophyless 1991–92 season. As his successor, Benfica brought in Croatian manager Tomislav Ivić, who had arrived in Portugal in 1987 to represent Porto and guided them to four trophies in one season. Ivić chose Shéu to be his assistant, instead of Toni, who had been Eriksson's assistant as well as Benfica's manager during Ivić's previous tenure at Porto. One of Ivić's first demands was to reduce the width of the Estádio da Luz pitch to simulate the smaller fields that the team would encounter in away games.

Benfica started the season in good form, winning the first game, but this performance was not continued through the following matches. In September, the team dropped the first points, lagging behind in the title race, and lost the 1991 Supertaça Cândido de Oliveira replay final against Porto on penalties, despite a two-goal advantage. The results did not improve as the season progressed, and an away loss to Sporting CP (the first in eight years) caused Ivić to be sacked days later and replaced by Toni. The effect was not immediate as the team suffered a compromising loss against Porto, which opened a four-point gap at the top of the league standings. After December, good results in Europe and in the Taça de Portugal helped to boost the team's morale and performance.

In January, Benfica signed Paulo Futre, the 1987 Ballon d'Or runner-up with Porto, for what the media described to be upwards of £2.4 million. Later that month, Benfica played with Porto at the Estádio das Antas for the sixth round of the Portuguese cup. Porto took the lead soon after Mozer's sending off on the 70th minute, but Benfica drew level through Aleksandr Mostovoi, with two minutes to play. The contend was decided in a replay match in Lisbon, which Benfica won 2–0 with goals from Isaías and Sergei Yuran.

Over the following months, Benfica had their best period of the season. Nonetheless, March was a difficult month as the team marginally defeated Sporting CP at home after dropping points in the title race against Farense, and were knocked out of the UEFA Cup by Roberto Baggio's and Gianluca Vialli's Juventus. In early April, Benfica closed the gap to leaders Porto to one point, after a hard-fought away win against Boavista. Ahead of the Clássico on 17 April, Porto and Benfica were tied in points, but as the match ended with a goalless draw, the title race remained open.

Entering May, Benfica reached the top of the Primeira Divisão but their campaign in the Taça de Portugal nearly came to an end in the semifinal. Trailing 1–0 to Vitória de Guimarães until the 78th minute, goals from Isaías and Rui Águas (89th minute) overturned the score and qualified Benfica for the final. On matchday 31, a 1–0 loss against Beira-Mar in Aveiro saw Benfica lose the league lead back to Porto, and a goalless away draw against Estoril in the penultimate day confirmed back-to-back league titles for Porto.

The team concluded the season on 10 June 1993 by beating Boavista 5–2 in the 1993 Taça de Portugal final, with an inspired performance by Futre.

== Competitions ==
Win Draw Loss Postponed

=== Overall record ===
Competition	First match	Last match	Record								
Competition	First match	Last match	G	W	D	L	GF	GA	GD	Win %	Source
Primeira Divisão	30 August 1992	6 June 1993	34	22	8	4	60	18	+42	64.71	
Taça de Portugal	29 November 1992	10 June 1993	7	6	1	0	19	5	+14	85.71	
UEFA Cup	16 September 1992	17 March 1993	8	6	1	1	20	7	+13	75.00	
Supertaça	9 September 1992	9 September 1992	1	0	1	0	1	1	+0	0.00	
Total			50	34	11	5	100	31	+69	68.00	

=== Supertaça Cândido de Oliveira ===
9 September 1992 Replay	Benfica	1–1 (3–4 p)	Porto	Estádio Municipal de Coimbra, Coimbra
	Isaías 72'		84' João Pinto	Referee: José Pratas (Évora)
	Penalties
	William (penalty scored); Rui Águas (penalty scored); Kulkov (penalty scored); Isaías (penalty missed); Hélder (penalty missed); Mostovoi (penalty missed)		(penalty missed) João Pinto; (penalty missed) Fernando Couto; (penalty scored) Aloísio; (penalty scored) André; (penalty scored) Antônio Carlos; (penalty scored) Paulinho César

=== Primeira Divisão ===
==== League table ====
Pos	Team	Pld	W	D	L	GF	GA	GD	Pts	Qualification or relegation
1	Porto (C)	34	24	6	4	57	17	+40	54	Qualification to Champions League first round
2	Benfica	34	22	8	4	60	18	+42	52	Qualification to Cup Winners' Cup first round (Note: Benfica qualified for the Cup Winners' Cup as Portuguese Cup winners)
3	Sporting CP	34	17	11	6	59	30	+29	45	Qualification to UEFA Cup first round
4	Boavista	34	14	11	9	46	34	+12	39	Qualification to UEFA Cup first round
5	Marítimo	34	15	7	12	56	48	+8	37	Qualification to UEFA Cup first round

Source: Primeira Divisão
Rules for classification: 1st points, 2nd goals average, 3rd number of points obtained in the matches between the teams in question
(C) Champions

==== Results by round ====
Round	1	2	3	4	5	6	7	8	9	10	11	12	13	14	15	16	17	18	19	20	21	22	23	24	25	26	27	28	29	30	31	32	33	34
Ground	H	A	H	A	H	A	H	A	A	H	A	H	A	H	A	H	A	A	H	A	H	A	H	A	H	H	A	H	A	H	A	H	A	H
Result	W	W	D	L	W	W	W	L	D	W	L	W	W	D	D	W	D	W	W	W	W	W	W	D	W	W	W	D	W	W	L	W	D	W
Position	1	1	1	3	3	1	1	2	3	2	3	3	2	2	2	2	2	2	2	2	2	2	2	2	2	2	2	2	1	1	2	2	2	2

Source: ForaDeJogo
A = Away; H = Home; W = Win; D = Draw; L = Loss

==== Matches ====
23 August 1992 1	Benfica	Postponed	Paços de Ferreira	Lisbon
		Report		Stadium: Estádio da Luz

30 August 1992 2	Tirsense	1–2	Benfica	Santo Tirso
19:00	Silvinho 1'	Report	William 22' (pen.); João Pinto 78'	Stadium: Abel de Figueiredo; Attendance: 4,000; Referee: Bento Marques

5 September 1992 3	Benfica	0–0	Salgueiros	Lisbon
19:45		Report		Stadium: Estádio da Luz; Attendance: 25,000; Referee: José Rufino

13 September 1992 4	Famalicão	1–0	Benfica	Vila Nova de Famalicão
20:00	Freitas 78'	Report		Stadium: Estádio Municipal 22 de Junho; Attendance: 9,000; Referee: Carlos Valente

20 September 1992 5	Benfica	2–1	Braga	Lisbon
19:00	Pacheco 38'; Rui Águas 44'	Report	Chiquinho Carlos 76'	Stadium: Estádio da Luz; Attendance: 25,000; Referee: António Rola

27 September 1992 6	Sporting Espinho	0–3	Benfica	Espinho
20:30		Report	José Carlos 44'; João Pinto 60'; Vítor Paneira 86'	Stadium: Comendador Manuel Violas; Attendance: 3,000; Referee: Bento Marques

4 October 1992 7	Benfica	1–0	Farense	Lisbon
20:00	Vítor Paneira 11'	Report		Stadium: Estádio da Luz; Attendance: 30,000; Referee: Mário Leal

17 October 1992 8	Sporting	2–0	Benfica	Lisbon
21:00	Balakov 1'; Yordanov 53' (yellow card) n/d' (yellow-red card) 77'; Filipe (yellow card) n/d' (yellow-red card) 54'	Report	Vítor Paneira (red card) 54'	Stadium: Estádio de Alvalade; Attendance: 50,000; Referee: Carlos Valente

25 October 1992 9	Gil Vicente	1–1	Benfica	Barcelos
20:15	Drulović 7'	Report	Fernando Mendes 50'	Stadium: Estádio Adelino Ribeiro Novo; Attendance: 30,000; Referee: Serafim Alvito

31 October 1992 10	Benfica	2–0	Boavista	Lisbon
20:00	Isaías 4'; Schwarz 89'	Report		Stadium: Estádio da Luz; Attendance: 45,000; Referee: José Pratas

8 November 1992 11	Porto	1–0	Benfica	Porto
20:30	Timofte 85' (pen.)	Report		Stadium: Estádio das Antas; Attendance: 50,000; Referee: Veiga Trigo

15 November 1992 12	Benfica	3–1	Desportivo de Chaves	Lisbon
20:00	Isaías 34'; Schwarz 53'; Hélder 74'	Report	Saavedra 3'	Stadium: Estádio da Luz; Attendance: 40,000; Referee: Juvenal Silvestre

21 November 1992 13	Vitória Guimarães	0–1	Benfica	Guimarães
19:00		Report	Taoufik Herichi 57' (o.g.)	Stadium: Estádio D. Afonso Henriques; Attendance: 8,000; Referee: João Simãozinho

5 December 1992 14	Benfica	0–0	Beira Mar	Lisbon
19:45		Report		Stadium: Estádio da Luz; Attendance: 25,000; Referee: Monteiro da Silva

13 December 1992 15	Marítimo	1–1	Benfica	Funchal
19:00	Heitor 42'	Report	Yuran 6'	Stadium: Estádio dos Barreiros; Attendance: 15,000; Referee: António Rola

19 December 1992 16	Benfica	4–0	Estoril-Praia	Lisbon
20:00	Vítor Paneira 40'; Isaías 46', 88'; Yuran 55'	Report		Stadium: Estádio da Luz; Attendance: 30,000; Referee: Jorge Coroado

23 December 1992 1	Benfica	5–0	Paços de Ferreira	Lisbon
19:45	Rui Costa 11'; Yuran 39', 87'; Vítor Paneira 41'; João Pinto 78'	Report		Stadium: Estádio da Luz; Attendance: 25,000; Referee: Lucílio Baptista

3 January 1993 17	Belenenses	1–1	Benfica	Lisbon
21:00	Guto 44' (yellow card) 25' (yellow-red card) 83'	Report	Hélder 57'; Paulo Sousa (red card) 65'; Pacheco (red card) 77'	Stadium: Estádio do Restelo; Attendance: 5,000; Referee: Lourenço Ferreira

9 January 1993 18	Paços de Ferreira	0–2	Benfica	Paços de Ferreira
20:00		Report	Isaías 29', 87'	Stadium: Estádio da Mata Real; Attendance: 5,000; Referee: Bento Marques

30 January 1993 19	Benfica	1–0	Tirsense	Lisbon
17:00	Isaías 68'	Report		Stadium: Estádio da Luz; Attendance: 25,000; Referee: Fortunato Azevedo

7 February 1993 20	Salgueiros	0–3	Benfica	Porto
20:45		Report	João Pinto 57'; Yuran 76'; Kulkov 79'	Stadium: Estádio Prof. Dr. José Vieira de Carvalho; Attendance: 5,000; Referee: Veiga Trigo

14 February 1993 21	Benfica	1–0	Famalicão	Lisbon
19:30	Rui Águas 16'	Report		Stadium: Estádio da Luz; Attendance: 25,000; Referee: Marques da Silva

28 February 1993 22	Braga	0–2	Benfica	Braga
19:45	Eusébio (yellow card) 52' (yellow-red card) 77'	Report	João Pinto 77', 86'	Stadium: Estádio 1º de Maio; Attendance: 15,000; Referee: Carlos Valente

7 March 1993 23	Benfica	5–1	Sporting Espinho	Lisbon
19:30	Rui Costa 7', 30', 83'; Vítor Paneira 32' (pen.); Futre 76'	Report	Ado 40'	Stadium: Estádio da Luz; Attendance: 35,000; Referee: Marques da Silva

13 March 1993 24	Farense	0–0	Benfica	Faro
19:45		Report		Stadium: Estádio de São Luís; Attendance: 15,000; Referee: Miranda de Sousa

21 March 1993 25	Benfica	1–0	Sporting	Lisbon
20:00	Futre 65'	Report		Stadium: Estádio da Luz; Attendance: 80,000; Referee: Jorge Coroado

4 April 1993 26	Benfica	2–1	Gil Vicente	Lisbon
18:00	Pacheco 47', 66'	Report	Miguel 43'	Stadium: Estádio da Luz; Attendance: 30,000; Referee: João Mesquita

10 April 1993 27	Boavista	2–3	Benfica	Porto
20:00	Marlon Brandão 2'; Caetano (yellow card) 5' (yellow-red card) 27'; Artur 72', g.p.'	Report	Yuran 14', 47'; Isaías 58'; Hélder (yellow card) 25' (yellow-red card) 65'; Neno (red card) 71'	Stadium: Estádio do Bessa; Attendance: 30,000; Referee: Fortunado Azevedo

17 April 1993 28	Benfica	0–0	Porto	Lisbon
20:00		Report		Stadium: Estádio da Luz; Attendance: 90,000; Referee: Veiga Trigo

2 May 1993 29	Desportivo de Chaves	0–1	Benfica	Chaves
19:00	Karoglan (yellow card) 5' (yellow-red card) 80'	Report	Paulo Sousa (red card) 80'; Yuran (yellow card) 5' (yellow-red card) 80'; Schwarz 87'	Stadium: Estádio Municipal de Chaves; Attendance: 10,000; Referee: Lourenço Ferreira

9 May 1993 30	Benfica	3–1	Vitória Guimarães	Lisbon
20:30	William 40' (pen.); Isaías 42'; Yuran 49'	Report	Ziad 89'	Stadium: Estádio da Luz; Attendance: 80,000; Referee: José Filipe

16 May 1993 31	Beira-Mar	1–0	Benfica	Aveiro
19:00	Dino 86'	Report	Yuran (yellow card) n/d' (yellow-red card) 61'; Pacheco (yellow card) n/d' (yellow-red card) 90'	Stadium: Estádio Mário Duarte; Attendance: 5,000; Referee: Carlos Calheiros

23 May 1993 32	Benfica	5–1	Marítimo	Lisbon
17:00	João Pinto 4'; William 15'; Rui Águas 35', 66', 79'	Report	Ademir Alcântara 22'	Stadium: Estádio da Luz; Attendance: 45,000; Referee: João Mesquita

30 May 1993 33	Estoril Praia	0–0	Benfica	Estoril
20:30		Report		Stadium: Estádio António Coimbra da Mota; Attendance: 15,000; Referee: Pinto Correia

6 June 1993 34	Benfica	5–1	Belenenses	Lisbon
20:00	Abel Silva 6'; Rui Águas 9'; Futre 21'; César Brito 74'; Vítor Paneira 83'	Report	Emerson 86'	Stadium: Estádio da Luz; Attendance: 50,000; Referee: Bento Marques

=== Taça de Portugal ===
29 November 1992 Fourth Rd	Louletano	0–1	Benfica	Loulé
19:45			Pacheco 76' (pen.)	Stadium: Municipal de Loulé; Attendance: 2,000; Referee: Bento Marques

27 December 1993 Fifth Rd	Rio Ave	1–3	Benfica	Vila do Conde
20:30	Gama 79'		Kulkov 12'; Hélder 40'; Vítor Paneira 76'	Stadium: Estádio do Rio Ave FC; Referee: José Pratas

17 January 1993 Sixth Rd	Porto	1−1 (a.e.t.)	Benfica	Porto
20:30	Timofte 72'		Mostovoi 88'; Mozer (yellow card) n/d' (yellow-red card) 70'	Stadium: Estádio das Antas; Referee: José Pratas

27 January 1993 6R Replay	Benfica	2–0	Porto	Lisbon
20:30	Isaías 58'; Yuran 85' (pen.)		Aloísio (red card) 74'	Stadium: Estádio da Luz; Attendance: 90,000; Referee: Carlos Valente

3 February 1993 Quarter-final	Benfica	5–0	Amora	Lisbon
18:00	Mostovoi 43'; Pacheco 69' (pen.); Yuran 75' (pen.); Paulo Sousa 81'			Stadium: Estádio da Luz; Attendance: 20,000; Referee: Mário Leal

6 May 1993 Semi-final	Vitória Guimarães	1–2	Benfica	Guimarães
19:00	Ziad 2'		Isaías 78'; Rui Águas 89'	Stadium: Estádio D. Afonso Henriques; Attendance: 8,000; Referee: Carlos Valente

10 June 1993 Final	Benfica	5–2	Boavista	Oeiras
17:00 WEST	Paneira 32'; João Pinto 35'; Futre 48', 70'; Águas 88'		Brandão 44'; Alfredo (red card) 50'; Tavares 57'; José Garrido (yellow card) (red card) 87'	Stadium: Estádio Nacional, Attendance: 20,000; Referee: Veiga Trigo

=== UEFA Cup ===
==== First round ====
16 September 1992 First leg	Benfica (Portugal)	3–0	(Slovenia) Belvedur Izola	Lisbon
19;45	Paneira 41', 73'; William 44' (pen.)	Report		Stadium: Estádio da Luz; Attendance: 25,000; Referee: Vasilakis Periklis

29 September 1992 Second leg	Belvedur Izola (Slovenia)	0–5 (0–8 agg.)	(Portugal) Benfica	Izola
19;45		Report	Pacheco 20', 46', 75'; Pinto 56'; Brito 87'	Stadium: Izola City Stadium; Attendance: 3,000; Referee: Jacobus Vilenberg (Netherlands)

==== Second round ====
21 October 1992 First leg	Benfica (Portugal)	5–1	(Hungary) Vác FC-Samsung	Lisbon
19;45	Yuran 42'; Isaías 55', 85'; Pacheco 57' (pen.); William 79' (pen.)	Report	Szedlacsek 82'	Stadium: Estádio da Luz; Attendance: 50,000; Referee: Ryszard Wójcik

4 November 1992 Second leg	Vác FC-Samsung (Hungary)	0–1 (1–6 agg.)	(Portugal) Benfica	Vác
19;45		Report	Schwarz 13'	Stadium: Stadion Városi Vác; Attendance: 20,000; Referee: Oğuz Sarvan (Turkey)

==== Third round ====
25 November 1992 First leg	Dynamo Moscow (Russia)	2–2	(Portugal) Benfica	Moscow
20:30	Kalitvintsev 75'; Derkach 88'	Report	Isaías 35', 53'	Stadium: Dynamo Stadium; Attendance: 8,700; Referee: John Blankenstein (Netherlands)

8 December 1992 Second leg	Benfica (Portugal)	2–0 (4–2 agg.)	(Russia) Dynamo Moscow	Lisbon
21:15	Isaías 51'; Yuran 57'	Report		Stadium: Estádio da Luz; Attendance: 67,000; Referee: Gheorghe Constantin (Romania)

==== Quarter-finals ====
4 March 1993 First leg	Benfica (Portugal)	2–1	(Italy) Juventus	Lisbon
21:00	Paneira 11', 76'	Report	Vialli 58' (pen.)	Stadium: Estádio da Luz, Attendance: 80,000; Referee: Guy Goethals (Belgium)

17 March 1993 Second leg	Juventus (Italy)	3–0 (4–2 agg.)	(Portugal) Benfica	Turin
17:45	Kohler 2'; D. Baggio 45'; Ravanelli 67'	Report		Stadium: Stadio delle Alpi; Attendance: 21,500; Referee: Mikkelsen (Denmark)

=== Friendlies ===
22 July 1992	Ränneslövs	0–7	Benfica	Ränneslöv
				Stadium: Björkvallen

23 July 1992	Grimeton	1–6	Benfica	Varberg

24 July 1992	Åsa	0–1	Benfica	Åsa
				Stadium: Åsa IP

25 July 1992	Bua IF	1–7	Benfica	Väröbacka

26 July 1992	Huskvarna FF	3–2	Benfica	Huskvarna
				Stadium: Vapenvallen

27 July 1992	Galtabäcks	0–12	Benfica	Tvååker
				Stadium: Galtabäcks IP

28 July 1992	Ljungby	0–9	Benfica	Ljungby
				Stadium: Lagavallen

29 July 1992	Vällinge	1–7	Benfica	Ekerö

31 July 1992	Göteborg	1–2	Benfica	Varberg
				Stadium: Påskbergsvallen

19 August 1992 Pepsi Cup	Benfica	2–0	Real Madrid	Lisbon
				Stadium: Estádio da Luz

22 August 1992 Trofeo Colombino	Benfica	1–0	Uruguay	Huelva
				Stadium: Estadio Colombino

23 August 1992 Trofeo Colombino	Benfica	0–2	Chile	Huelva
				Stadium: Estadio Colombino

1 December 1992 Eusébio Tstm	Benfica	1–0	Manchester United	Lisbon
				Stadium: Estádio da Luz

== Player statistics ==
The squad for the season consisted of the players listed in the tables below, as well as staff member Tomislav Ivic (manager) and Toni(manager).

Note 1: Note: Flags indicate national team as defined under FIFA eligibility rules. Players may hold more than one non-FIFA nationality.

Note 2: Players with squad numbers marked ‡ joined the club during the 1992-93 season via transfer, with more details in the following section.

No.	Pos	Nat	Player	Total		Primeira Divisão		Taça de Portugal		UEFA Cup		Supertaça	
No.	Pos	Nat	Player	Apps	Goals	Apps	Goals	Apps	Goals	Apps	Goals	Apps	Goals
1	GK	(Portugal) POR	Silvino	37	-19	28	-13	0	0	8	-5	1	-1
1	GK	(Portugal) POR	Neno	14	-11	6	-4	7	-5	1	-2	0	0
2	DF	(Portugal) POR	António Veloso	43	0	28	0	6	0	8	0	1	0
2^{‡}	DF	(Portugal) POR	Abel Xavier	1	0	0	0	1	0	0	0	0	0
2^{‡}	DF	(Portugal) POR	Abel Silva	2	1	2	1	0	0	0	0	0	0
3	DF	(Portugal) POR	José Carlos	27	1	19	1	2	0	6	0	0	0
3^{‡}	DF	(Portugal) POR	Fernando Mendes	19	1	13	1	3	0	2	0	1	0
4^{‡}	DF	(Portugal) POR	Samuel Quina	7	0	4	0	1	0	1	0	1	0
4^{‡}	DF	(Portugal) POR	Hélder Cristóvão	46	3	30	2	7	1	8	0	1	0
4	DF	(Brazil) BRA	William	30	5	20	3	4	0	5	2	1	0
5	DF	(Portugal) POR	Paulo Madeira	16	0	11	0	1	0	4	0	0	0
5^{‡}	DF	(Brazil) BRA	Carlos Mozer	18	0	13	0	3	0	2	0	0	0
5	MF	(Sweden) SWE	Schwarz	42	4	29	3	5	0	8	1	0	0
6	MF	(Portugal) POR	Paulo Sousa	35	1	25	0	4	1	6	0	0	0
6	MF	(Russia) RUS	Vasili Kulkov	21	2	14	1	4	1	2	0	1	0
7	MF	(Portugal) POR	Vítor Paneira	43	12	28	6	6	2	8	4	1	0
8^{‡}	MF	(Portugal) POR	João Pinto	32	9	21	7	6	1	4	1	1	0
8	MF	(Portugal) POR	António Pacheco	34	9	26	3	3	2	5	4	0	0
9	FW	(Portugal) POR	Rui Águas	34	8	23	6	6	2	4	0	1	0
9	FW	(Russia) RUS	Sergei Yuran	32	13	22	8	4	3	6	2	0	0
10^{‡}	MF	(Portugal) POR	Paulo Futre	13	5	11	3	2	2	0	0	0	0
10	MF	(Portugal) POR	Rui Costa	32	4	23	4	4	0	4	0	1	0
11	MF	(Brazil) BRA	Isaías	38	17	26	9	5	2	6	5	1	1
11	FW	(Portugal) POR	César Brito	3	2	2	1	0	0	1	1	0	0
12^{‡}	GK	(Portugal) POR	Pedro Roma	0	0	0	0	0	0	0	0	0	0
15	MF	(Portugal) POR	Hernâni Neves	4	0	3	0	1	0	0	0	0	0
16^{‡}	MF	(Russia) RUS	Aleksandr Mostovoi	16	2	9	0	3	2	3	0	1	0
22	DF	(Portugal) POR	Daniel Kenedy	2	0	1	0	1	0	0	0	0	0

== Transfers ==
=== In ===
Entry date	Position	Player	From club
July 1992	GK	Pedro Roma	Académica
July 1992	RB	Abel Xavier	Estrela da Amadora
July 1992	RB	Abel Silva	Maritimo
July 1992	CB	Hélder Cristóvão	Estoril
July 1992	CB	Carlos Mozer	Marseille
July 1992	AM	Aleksandr Mostovoi	Spartak Moscow
July 1992	AM	João Pinto	Boavista
July 1992	CB	Samuel Quina	Boavista
July 1992	LB	Fernando Mendes	Boavista
January 1993	LW	Paulo Futre	Atlético Madrid

=== Out ===
Exit date	Position	Player	To club
July 1992	GK	Manuel Bento	Retired
July 1992	CB	Rui Bento	Boavista
July 1992	AM	Erwin Sánchez	Boavista
July 1992	DM	Jonas Thern	Napoli
July 1992	ST	Mats Magnusson	Helsingborg
