= 1991–92 S.L. Benfica season =

Benfica
1991–92 season
- President: João Santos (until 24 April 1992); Jorge de Brito
- Head coach: Sven-Göran Eriksson
- Stadium: Estádio da Luz
- Primeira Divisão: 2nd
- Taça de Portugal: Semi-finals
- European Cup: Group stage
- Supertaça Cândido de Oliveira: Drawn
- Top goalscorer: League: Isaías (12); All: Isaías (17)
- Highest home attendance: 90,000 vs Porto (22 March 1992)
- Lowest home attendance: 15,000 vs União da Madeira (3 May 1992)
Home colours

The 1991–92 season was Sport Lisboa e Benfica's 88th season in existence and the club's 58th consecutive season in the top flight of Portuguese football, covering the period from 1 July 1991 to 30 June 1992. Benfica competed domestically in the Primeira Divisão and the Taça de Portugal, and participated in the European Cup by winning the previous league.

Entering the season as defending champions, the third year of Sven-Göran Eriksson was less successful than before. During the transfer season, Benfica lost two important players – Ricardo Gomes and Valdo to Paris Saint-Germain. As new signings, the club brought in Russians Vasili Kulkov and Sergei Yuran, and promoted youth graduates Paulo Madeira and Rui Costa to regular starters. In the league race, Benfica competed with Porto until January, when a three-point gap opened, and a subsequent home loss against them two months later, ended hopes of retaining the title. Still, the team made history when it defeated Arsenal in Highbury to qualify for the new format of the European Cup, now with a group stage.

== Season summary ==
In his fifth year at Benfica, Swedish manager Sven-Göran Eriksson had to rebuild a new eleven, following the departures of Ricardo Gomes and Valdo to Paris Saint-Germain. After two seasons as back-up, Paulo Madeira had its breakthrough season alongside William, amassing 47 appearances, second-best in the squad. To replace Valdo, Eriksson opted for the 19 year-old, Rui Costa, which had just returned from a successful loan spell at AD Fafe. Benfica also made a few signings, notably Vasili Kulkov and Sergei Yuran, both internationals for the Soviet Union.

Benfica entered their league campaign with a home loss to Boavista. In the following weeks, they recovered the lost ground, and finished September in fourth place, only a point from first. In the same month, the team started their European Cup run with a 10–0 win on aggregate over Hamrun Spartans. On 3 November, Benfica draws the first Clássico of the year, at Estádio das Antas, as the two teams were now matched in second. Three days later, in the second round of the European Cup, Benfica visited Highbury and knocked Arsenal out of the competition, with a 3–1 win, in part due to the individual efforts from Isaías, who bagged a double. It was the first time since 1961–62 that the club defeated a team from England, and granted a spot on the newly created group stages of the tournament. November ended with mixed results, they were joint-first on the league, but lost their European Cup opening game against Dynamo Kyiv.

In December, the team collected two wins and two draws in the domestic league, making them trail Porto by a point at the New Year. Similar situation happened in Europe, after a home draw to Barcelona, they were last at their group after the second match-day. However, in the other competitions, they opened the Portuguese Cup with a win and beat Porto on the first leg of the Supercup. In January, three win less match-days that spread from 29 December to 19 January, which included a second loss to Boavista, increased Porto's gap to three points on the title race, while on the second league of the Supercup, a one-nil loss, postponed the trophy decision until September.

After a fruitful February, in which the team bagged 9 points out of 10 possible, they entered March still chasing Porto who retained the same lead. After a second home draw in the European Cup, on 4 March against Sparta Prague, Benfica postponed the league match of 15th, to better focus in the return leg to Czechoslovakia. However the contend ended in another draw, and the three points in four match-days, Barcelona qualified for the final, as they had seven points. On the following Sunday in a decisive game for the title race, an 89th-minute goal from Ion Timofte gave Porto a 3–2 win at Estádio da Luz and increased their lead to five points. As consolation, the team beat Sporting de Espinho by 6–0 win in the quarter-finals of the Portuguese Cup, thus ensuring a third game against Boavista, on the semi-finals.

April ended any hopes of a silverware, as competitions dropped in succession. Despite recording a first win in the European Cup on 1 April, the closing match of the competition, at the Camp Nou, began a dark spell. With a 2–1 loss to Barcelona on the 15th, Benfica started a win less spree that cost them the two remaining competitions. On Saturday the 18th, the team draws to Farense at home. Four days later, Boavista knocks Benfica out of the Portuguese Cup final, beating them for a third time in the season. Next in consecutive away games, Benfica loses to Beira-Mar on the 26th and then awards the title to Porto on the 30th, after losing to Desportivo de Chaves, the delayed game from March. Benfica ended in second, 10 points away from Porto, with nine points dropped at home, from two losses to Boavista and Porto, and draws to Estori-Praia, Penafiel, Torreense, Salgueiros and Farense. Eriksson departed to Sampdoria at the end of season.

== Competitions ==
Win Draw Loss Postponed

=== Overall record ===
Competition	First match	Last match	Record								
Competition	First match	Last match	G	W	D	L	GF	GA	GD	Win %	Source
Primeira Divisão	17 August 1991	17 May 1992	34	17	12	5	62	23	+39	50.00	
Taça de Portugal	15 December 1991	22 April 1992	6	4	1	1	14	3	+11	66.67	
European Cup	18 September 1991	15 April 1992	10	4	4	2	22	7	+15	40.00	
Supertaça	18 December 1991	29 January 1992	2	1	0	1	2	2	+0	50.00	
Total			52	26	17	9	100	35	+65	50.00	

=== Supertaça Cândido de Oliveira ===
18 December 1991 First leg	Benfica	2–1	Porto	Luz, Lisbon
	Yuran 16'; William 76'		Magalhães 61'	Attendance: 70,000; Referee: José Pratas (Évora)

29 January 1992 Second leg	Porto	1–0	Benfica	Antas, Porto
	Timofte 67'		Paneira (yellow card) 0' (yellow-red card) 26'	Attendance: 50,000; Referee: Bento Marques (Évora)

=== Primeira Divisão ===
==== League table ====
Pos	Team	Pld	W	D	L	GF	GA	GD	Pts	Qualification or relegation
1	Porto (C)	34	24	8	2	58	11	+47	56	Qualification to Champions League first round
2	Benfica	34	17	12	5	62	23	+39	46	Qualification to UEFA Cup first round
3	Boavista	34	16	12	6	45	27	+18	44	Qualification to Cup Winners' Cup first round (Note: Boavista qualified for the Cup Winners' Cup as Portuguese Cup winners)
4	Sporting CP	34	18	8	8	56	26	+30	44	Qualification to UEFA Cup first round
5	Vitória de Guimarães	34	14	13	7	46	35	+11	41	Qualification to UEFA Cup first round

Source: Primeira Divisão
Rules for classification: 1st points, 2nd head-to-head, 3rd goals average
(C) Champions

==== Results by round ====
Round	1	2	3	4	5	6	7	8	9	10	11	12	13	14	15	16	17	18	19	20	21	22	23	24	25	26	27	28	29	30	31	32	33	34
Ground	H	A	H	A	H	A	H	A	H	A	H	A	A	H	A	H	A	A	H	A	H	A	H	A	H	A	H	A	H	H	A	H	A	H
Result	L	W	W	D	D	W	W	D	W	D	W	W	D	W	W	D	D	L	W	W	W	W	D	W	W	L	L	D	W	D	L	W	D	D
Position	15	9	6	6	5	4	3	4	3	3	3	2	2	2	2	2	2	2	2	2	2	2	2	2	2	2	2	2	2	2	2	2	2	2

Source: ForaDeJogo
A = Away; H = Home; W = Win; D = Draw; L = Loss

==== Matches ====
17 August 1991 1	Benfica	0–1	Boavista	Lisbon
19:45		Report	Casaca 13'	Stadium: Estádio da Luz; Attendance: 35,000; Referee: José Pratas

24 August 1991 2	Gil Vicente	0–1	Benfica	Barcelos
20:15		Report	Pacheco 41' (pen.)	Stadium: Estádio Adelino Ribeiro Novo; Attendance: 18,000; Referee: Miranda de Sousa

1 September 1991 3	Benfica	2–0	Vitória Guimarães	Lisbon
20:30	Pacheco 43'; Rui Águas 64'	Report		Stadium: Estádio da Luz; Attendance: 40,000; Referee: Carlos Valente

14 September 1991 4	Sporting	0–0	Benfica	Lisbon
21:00		Report		Stadium: Estádio de Alvalade; Attendance: 60,000; Referee: Vítor Correia

22 September 1991 5	Benfica	2–2	Estoril-Praia	Lisbon
20:00	Pacheco 51'; Rui Águas 78'	Report	Voynov 55'; Passos 89'	Stadium: Estádio da Luz; Attendance: 30,000; Referee: Fernando Correia

29 September 1991 6	Torreense	1–3	Benfica	Torres Vedras
20:30	Bigu 87'	Report	Magnusson 33', 40'; Isaías 81'	Stadium: Campo Manuel Marques; Attendance: 3,000; Referee: António Marçal

5 October 1991 7	Benfica	2–0	Marítimo	Lisbon
19:00	Yuran 6', 37'	Report		Stadium: Estádio da Luz; Attendance: 25,000; Referee: João Simãozinho

19 October 1991 8	Paços de Ferreira	1–1	Benfica	Paços de Ferreira
20:00	Adalberto 61'	Report	César Brito 79'	Stadium: Estádio da Mata Real; Attendance: 5,000; Referee: Donato Ramos

27 October 1991 9	Benfica	4–1	Desportivo de Chaves	Lisbon
20:00	José Carlos 11'; Yuran 29'; Isaías 64'; Magnusson 75'	Report	Marito 89'	Stadium: Estádio da Luz; Attendance: 25,000; Referee: Carlos Carvalho

3 November 1991 10	Porto	0–0	Benfica	Porto
20:30		Report		Stadium: Estádio das Antas; Attendance: 45,000; Referee: Fortunato Azevedo

10 November 1991 11	Benfica	2–1	Famalicão	Lisbon
19:30	Rui Costa 6'; Rui Águas 72'	Report	Dane 53'	Stadium: Estádio da Luz; Attendance: 25,000; Referee: Bento Marques

23 November 1991 12	Braga	0–2	Benfica	Braga
19:45		Report	Thern 6'; Rui Águas 61'	Stadium: Estádio 1º de Maio; Attendance: 10,000; Referee: Carlos Valente

1 December 1991 13	Farense	2–2	Benfica	Faro
19:45	Ricardo 60'; Teffo 79'	Report	Lemajic 35' (o.g.); Kulkov 83'	Stadium: Estádio de São Luís; Attendance: 5,000; Referee: Veiga Trigo

7 December 1991 14	Benfica	3–0	Beira Mar	Lisbon
19:45	Yuran 38'; Kulkov 57'; Isaías 72'	Report		Stadium: Estádio da Luz; Attendance: 25,000; Referee: Mário Leal

21 December 1991 15	União da Madeira	0–1	Benfica	Funchal
19:00		Report	Pacheco 75'	Stadium: Estádio dos Barreiros; Attendance: 4,000; Referee: José Silvano

29 December 1991 16	Benfica	1–1	Penafiel	Lisbon
19:45	Magnusson 42'	Report	Rebelo 43'	Stadium: Estádio da Luz; Attendance: 35,000; Referee: Serafim Alvito

4 January 1992 17	Salgueiros	1–1	Benfica	Porto
19:45	Joaquim Soares 9'	Report	Isaías 6'	Stadium: Estádio do Bessa; Attendance: 5,000; Referee: José Pratas

19 January 1992 18	Boavista	1–0	Benfica	Porto
20:00	Ricky 21'	Report		Stadium: Estádio do Bessa; Attendance: 17,000; Referee: Carlos Valente

25 January 1992 19	Benfica	5–0	Gil Vicente	Lisbon
19:00	Pacheco 29'; Paulo Madeira 60'; César Brito 64'; Rui Costa 74'; Magnusson 88'	Report		Stadium: Estádio da Luz; Attendance: 30,000; Referee: Donato Ramos

2 February 1992 20	Vitória Guimarães	1–3	Benfica	Guimarães
19:00	Ziad 82'	Report	César Brito 35'; Kulkov 67'; Isaías 69'	Stadium: Estádio D. Afonso Henriques; Attendance: 12,000; Referee: Veiga Trigo

9 February 1992 21	Benfica	2–0	Sporting	Lisbon
20:00	William 57' (pen.); Pacheco 83'	Report		Stadium: Estádio da Luz; Attendance: 80,000; Referee: Fortunato Azevedo

16 February 1992 22	Estoril Praia	0–2	Benfica	Estoril
20:00		Report	Isaías 3'; César Brito 64'	Stadium: Estádio António Coimbra da Mota; Attendance: 15,000; Referee: Fernando Correia

23 February 1992 23	Benfica	0–0	Torreense	Lisbon
19:45	Paulo Sousa (red card) 37'; César Brito (red card) 90'; Pacheco (red card) 90'	Report		Stadium: Estádio da Luz; Attendance: 25,000; Referee: Jorge Coroado

29 February 1992 24	Marítimo	0–4	Benfica	Funchal
19:00		Report	Rui Costa 29', 59'; Magnusson 56', 72'	Stadium: Estádio dos Barreiros; Attendance: 10,000; Referee: Veiga Trigo

8 March 1992 25	Benfica	4–0	Paços de Ferreira	Lisbon
20:00	Pacheco 29'; César Brito 42', 83'; Thern 75'	Report		Stadium: Estádio da Luz; Attendance: 30,000; Referee: Adão Mendes

15 March 1992 26	Desportivo de Chaves	Postponed	Benfica	Chaves
		Report		Stadium: Estádio Municipal de Chaves

22 March 1992 27	Benfica	2–3	Porto	Lisbon
20:00	Rui Bento (yellow card) 0' (yellow-red card) 64'; William 74'; Yuran 85'	Report	João Pinto 64' (pen.); Kostadinov 84'; Jaime Magalhães (yellow card) 0' (yellow-red card) 87'; Timofte 89'	Stadium: Estádio da Luz; Attendance: 90,000; Referee: Fortunato Azevedo

5 April 1992 28	Famalicão	0–0	Benfica	Famalicão
20:00		Report		Stadium: Estádio Municipal 22 de Junho; Attendance: 7,500; Referee: José Pratas

11 April 1992 29	Benfica	2–0	Braga	Lisbon
19:00	César Brito 3'; Isaías 16'	Report		Stadium: Estádio da Luz; Attendance: 25,000; Referee: José Silvano

18 April 1992 30	Benfica	1–1	Farense	Lisbon
20:00	Yuran 89'	Report	Luizão 76'	Stadium: Estádio da Luz; Attendance: 30,000; Referee: Lourenço Ferreira

26 April 1992 31	Beira-Mar	2–1	Benfica	Aveiro
19:00	Miranda 44', 62'	Report	Isaías 28'; César Brito (red card) 83'	Stadium: Estádio Mário Duarte; Attendance: 10,000; Referee: Carlos Carvalho

30 April 1992 26	Desportivo de Chaves	1–0	Benfica	Chaves
19:00	Rudež 74'	Report	José Carlos (yellow card) 0' (yellow-red card) 38'	Stadium: Estádio Municipal de Chaves; Attendance: 10,000; Referee: Neves Fernandes

3 May 1992 32	Benfica	6–0	União da Madeira	Lisbon
20:00	Rui Águas 14'; Paulo Sousa 16'; Isaías 27', 81'; Magnusson 51', 63'	Report		Stadium: Estádio da Luz; Attendance: 15,000; Referee: João Mesquita

10 May 1992 33	Penafiel	2–2	Benfica	Penafiel
19:00	Szuster 38'; Vasco 86'	Report	William 68'; Isaías 70'; Neno (yellow card) 0' (yellow-red card) 85'	Stadium: Estádio Municipal 25 de Abril; Attendance: 4,000; Referee: Mário Leal

17 May 1992 34	Benfica	1–1	Salgueiros	Lisbon
19:45	Isaías 80'	Report	Abílio Novais 65'	Stadium: Estádio da Luz; Attendance: 25,000; Referee: José Filipe

=== Taça de Portugal ===
15 December 1991 Fourth Rd	Alverca	0–2	Benfica	Lisbon
19:45		Report	Magnusson 15', 87'	Stadium: Desportivo de Alverca; Attendance: 2,000; Referee: Vítor Correia

12 January 1992 Fifth Rd	Vitória de Setúbal	0–0 (a.e.t.)	Benfica	Setúbal
20:15		Report		Stadium: Estádio do Bonfim; Attendance: 4,000; Referee: Bento Marques

22 January 1992 5R Replay	Benfica	4–1	Vitória de Setúbal	Lisbon
20:30	Paulo Madeira 14'; César Brito 15'; Kulkov 67'; Vítor Paneira 81'	Report	9' Sobrinho	Stadium: Estádio da Luz; Attendance: 20,000; Referee: José Filipe

19 February 1992 Sixth Rd	Famalicão	0–1 (a.e.t.)	Benfica	Famalicão
21:00		Report	Thern 119'	Stadium: Estádio Municipal 22 de Junho; Attendance: 2,000; Referee: João Simãozinho

29 March 1992 Quarter-final	Benfica	6–0	Espinho	Lisbon
20:00	Pacheco 16'; Vítor Paneira 18'; Eliseu 25' (o.g.); Yuran 44'; César Brito 61'; Paulo Madeira 88'	Report		Stadium: Estádio da Luz; Attendance: 20,000; Referee: Bento Marques

22 April 1992 Semi-final	Benfica	1–2	Boavista	Lisbon
20:00	Pacheco 78' (pen.)	Report	Ricky 73', 90'	Stadium: Estádio da Luz; Attendance: 40,000; Referee: Mário Leal

=== European Cup ===
==== First round ====
18 September 1991 First leg	Hamrun Spartans (Malta)	0–6	(Portugal) Benfica	Malta
19:45		Report	Pacheco 30'; Yuran 32', 35', 50', 83'; Rui Águas 75'	Stadium: Ta' Qali National Stadium; Attendance: 15,000; Referee: Alfred Wieser (Austria)

2 October 1991 Second Leg	Benfica (Portugal)	4–0 (10–0 agg.)	(Malta) Hamrun Spartans	Lisbon
19:45	Isaías 52'; César Brito 70'; Yuran 73'; Paulo Madeira 75'	Report		Stadium: Estádio da Luz; Attendance: 40,000; Referee: Erny Kesseler (Luxembourg)

==== Second round ====
23 October 1991 First leg	Benfica (Portugal)	1–1	(England) Arsenal	Lisbon
20:00	Isaías 15'	Report	Campbell 18'	Stadium: Estádio da Luz; Attendance: 80,000; Referee: Tullio Lanese (Italy)

6 November 1991 Second leg	Arsenal (England)	1–3 (a.e.t.) (2–4 agg.)	(Portugal) Benfica	London
20:00	Pates 20'	Report	Isaías 36', 109'; Kulkov 100'	Stadium: Highbury; Attendance: 38,000; Referee: Aron Schmidhuber (Germany)

==== Group B ====
Pos	Team	Pld	W	D	L	GF	GA	GD	Pts	Qualification	BAR	SPP	BEN	DKV
1	(Spain) Barcelona	6	4	1	1	10	4	+6	9	Advance to final	—	3–2	2–1	3–0
2	(Czechoslovakia) Sparta Prague	6	2	2	2	7	7	0	6		1–0	—	1–1	2–1
3	(Portugal) Benfica	6	1	3	2	8	5	+3	5		0–0	1–1	—	5–0
4	(Commonwealth of Independent States) Dynamo Kyiv	6	2	0	4	3	12	−9	4		0–2	1–0	1–0	—

Source: UEFA

27 November 1991 1	Dynamo Kyiv (Soviet Union)	1–0	(Portugal) Benfica	Kyiv
19:45	Salenko 29'	Report		Stadium: Olimpiyskiy; Attendance: 80,000; Referee: Keith Hackett (England)

11 December 1991 2	Benfica (Portugal)	0–0	(Spain) Barcelona	Lisbon
19:45		Report		Stadium: Estádio da Luz; Attendance: 70,000; Referee: Bruno Galler (Switzerland)

4 March 1992 3	Benfica (Portugal)	1–1	(Czechoslovakia) Sparta Prague	Lisbon
19:45	Pacheco 53' (pen.)	Report	Novotný 31'	Stadium: Estádio da Luz; Attendance: 75,000; Referee: Howard King (Wales)

18 March 1992 4	Sparta Prague (Czechoslovakia)	1–1	(Portugal) Benfica	Prague
19:45	Chovanec 45'	Report	César Brito 29'	Stadium: Letná Stadium; Attendance: 20,000; Referee: Gérard Biguet (France)

1 April 1992 5	Benfica (Portugal)	5–0	(Ukraine) Dynamo Kyiv	Lisbon
19:45	César Brito 25', 62'; Isaías 71'; Yuran 83', 87'	Report		Stadium: Estádio da Luz; Attendance: 78,000; Referee: Mario van der Ende (Netherlands)

15 April 1992 6	Barcelona (Spain)	2–1	(Portugal) Benfica	Barcelona
20:00	Stoichkov 10'; Bakero 25'	Report	César Brito 27'	Stadium: Camp Nou; Attendance: 100,000; Referee: Hubert Forstinger (Austria)

=== Friendlies ===
25 July 1991	Alnö	1–6	Benfica	Alnön
	Roger Wermer 4'			Stadium: Släda IP

29 July 1991	Värnamo	1–5	Benfica	Värnamo
				Stadium: Finnvedsvallen

6 August 1991 Iberian Cup	Benfica	1–1	Atlético Madrid	Lisbon
				Stadium: Estádio da Luz

13 August 1991 Iberian Cup	Atlético Madrid	3–2	Benfica	Marbella
				Stadium: Estadio Municipal de Marbella

20 August 1991	Roma	2–0	Benfica	Rome
				Stadium: Stadio Olimpico

24 May 1992	Toronto Blizzard	0–2	Benfica	Toronto

27 May 1992	San Francisco Bay Blackhawks	0–2	Benfica	San Jose

== Player statistics ==
The squad for the season consisted of the players listed in the tables below, as well as staff member Sven-Goran Eriksson (manager) and Toni (assistant manager).

Note 1: Note: Flags indicate national team as defined under FIFA eligibility rules. Players may hold more than one non-FIFA nationality.

Note 2: Players with squad numbers marked ‡ joined the club during the 1991-92 season via transfer, with more details in the following section.

No.	Pos	Nat	Player	Total		Primeira Divisão		Taça de Portugal		European Cup		Supertaça	
No.	Pos	Nat	Player	Apps	Goals	Apps	Goals	Apps	Goals	Apps	Goals	Apps	Goals
1	GK	(Portugal) POR	Manuel Bento	0	0	0	0	0	0	0	0	0	0
1	GK	(Portugal) POR	Silvino	9	-5	1	-1	6	-3	1	0	1	-1
1	GK	(Portugal) POR	Neno	44	-30	34	-22	0	0	9	-7	1	-1
2	DF	(Portugal) POR	António Veloso	49	0	32	0	6	0	9	0	2	0
2	DF	(Portugal) POR	José Carlos	42	1	29	1	5	0	6	0	2	0
4	DF	(Brazil) BRA	William	28	4	18	3	4	0	4	0	2	1
4	MF	(Portugal) POR	Rui Bento	37	0	24	0	4	0	7	0	2	0
4^{‡}	DF	(Portugal) POR	Pedro Valido	4	0	1	0	1	0	1	0	1	0
5	DF	(Portugal) POR	Paulo Madeira	47	4	32	1	4	2	9	1	2	0
5	MF	(Sweden) SWE	Stefan Schwarz	28	0	16	0	3	0	9	0	0	0
6	MF	(Portugal) POR	Paulo Sousa	32	1	23	1	5	0	3	0	1	0
6^{‡}	MF	(Russia) RUS	Vasili Kulkov	30	5	19	3	3	1	6	1	2	0
6	MF	(Portugal) POR	Hernâni Neves	0	0	0	0	0	0	0	0	0	0
7	MF	(Portugal) POR	Vítor Paneira	44	3	29	0	5	2	8	1	2	0
8	MF	(Sweden) SWE	Jonas Thern	42	3	27	2	5	1	8	0	2	0
8	MF	(Portugal) POR	António Pacheco	41	11	27	7	5	2	8	2	1	0
9	FW	(Portugal) POR	Rui Águas	18	6	14	5	1	0	3	1	0	0
9^{‡}	FW	(Russia) RUS	Sergei Yuran	35	15	21	6	3	1	9	7	2	1
9^{‡}	FW	(Portugal) POR	João Pires	2	0	1	0	0	0	1	0	0	0
10^{‡}	MF	(Portugal) POR	Rui Costa	32	4	21	4	3	0	7	0	1	0
11	FW	(Sweden) SWE	Mats Magnusson	30	11	22	9	4	2	3	0	1	0
11	MF	(Brazil) BRA	Isaías	40	17	26	12	5	0	8	5	1	0
11	FW	(Portugal) POR	César Brito	37	13	23	7	6	2	7	4	1	0

== Transfers ==
=== In ===
Entry date	Position	Player	From club
July 1991	FW	Sergei Yuran	Dynamo Kyiv
July 1991	MF	Vasili Kulkov	Spartak Moscow
July 1991	FW	João Pires	Estoril-Praia
July 1991	DF	Pedro Valido	Gil Vicente
July 1991	AM	Rui Costa	AD Fafe

=== Out ===
Exit date	Position	Player	To club
July 1991	CB	Samuel Quina	Boavista
July 1991	LB	Fernando Mendes	Boavista
July 1991	CB	Ricardo Gomes	Paris Saint-Germain
July 1991	AM	Valdo Filho	Paris Saint-Germain
July 1991	FW	Vata	Estrela da Amadora
July 1991	FW	Adesvaldo Lima	Internacional

=== Out by loan ===
Exit date	Position	Player	To club	Return date
July 1991	AM	Erwin Sánchez	Estoril-Praia	30 June 1992
