= Pedro Valido =

Portuguese football coach and former player

Personal information
- Full name: Pedro Manuel Valido Franco
- Date of birth: 13 March 1970 (age 56)
- Place of birth: Lisbon, Portugal
- Height: 1.83 m (6 ft 0 in)
- Position: Centre back

Team information
- Current team: Benfica B (assistant)

Youth career
- 1981–1984: Domingos Sávio
- 1984–1985: Atlético
- 1985–1988: Benfica

Senior career*
Years	Team	Apps	(Gls)
1988–1992	Benfica	1	(0)
1988–1989	→ Estoril (loan)	28	(3)
1989–1990	→ Feirense (loan)	19	(0)
1990–1991	→ Gil Vicente (loan)	38	(0)
1992–1994	Marítimo	42	(1)
1994–1995	Estrela Amadora	8	(0)
1995–1996	Tirsense	15	(0)
1996–1997	Belenenses	13	(0)
1997–1998	Felgueiras	23	(0)
1998–1999	Alverca	14	(0)
1999	Amora	4	(1)
1999–2000	Operário	13	(0)
2000–2002	Atlético	63	(2)
2002–2003	Seixal	26	(0)
2003–2005	Beira-Mar Monte Gordo		
Total		307	(7)

International career
1988	Portugal U18	8	(3)
1989	Portugal U20	6	(0)
1990–1991	Portugal U21	12	(1)

Managerial career
- 2002–2003: Seixal
- 2004–2005: Beira-Mar Monte Gordo
- 2005–2007: Atlético Cacém
- 2007–2019: Benfica (youth)
- 2019–: Benfica B (assistant)
Medal record
Men's football
Representing Portugal
FIFA U-20 World Cup
Winner	1989 Saudi Arabia
- * Club domestic league appearances and goals

Pedro Manuel Valido Franco CvIH (born 13 March 1970) is a Portuguese former footballer who played as a central defender. Currently, he is an assistant coach for Benfica B in Liga Portugal 2.

Starting out in the youth teams of Benfica, he amassed a total of 1 goal in 150 games in the Primeira Liga over the course of a career with eight different clubs.

Valido earned 26 caps for Portugal from under-18 to under-21 level, winning the 1989 World Championship with the under-20 side.

== Club career ==
Born in Lisbon, Valido started playing football as an 11-year-old at local Desportivo Domingos Sávio, finishing his development at S.L. Benfica. In 1988, he joined G.D. Estoril Praia on a loan deal, going on to spend one season in the Segunda Liga. It was followed by loans to Feirense and Gil Vicente.

During his spell at the Estádio da Luz, Valido only appeared once in the Primeira Liga (four competitive games), facing stiff competition from Rui Bento, Paulo Madeira and Wiliam. Prior to his release in June 1992, he was also loaned to fellow league clubs C.D. Feirense and Gil Vicente FC.

Valido then signed with C.S. Marítimo, contributing 30 appearances and one goal in his first year and helping the Madeirans to qualify to the UEFA Cup for the first time in their history. He subsequently became a journeyman, appearing for four teams in the top division before dropping down to the third level in 1999 and the fourth in 2003.

Valido retired in 2005, at the age of 35. He returned to Benfica two years later, working as assistant manager in several youth sides while also becoming a sports pundit on Benfica TV.

== International career ==
Valido was part of the Portugal squad that appeared at the 1989 FIFA World Youth Championship, held in Saudi Arabia. He played in every minute in every game in what turned out to be a conquest, featuring alongside Benfica teammates Fernando Brassard, Madeira, Abel Silva and Paulo Sousa.

Valido made his debut for the under-21s on 25 April 1989.
