= João Pires =

João Pires may refer to:

- João Pires (athlete) (born 1979), Portuguese middle-distance runner
- João Pires (bobsleigh) (born 1969), Portuguese bobsledder
- João Pires (footballer) (born 1970), Portuguese footballer
- João Pires (politician) (born 1998), Brazilian politician
