= Paulo Sousa =

Portuguese football manager and former player (born 1970)

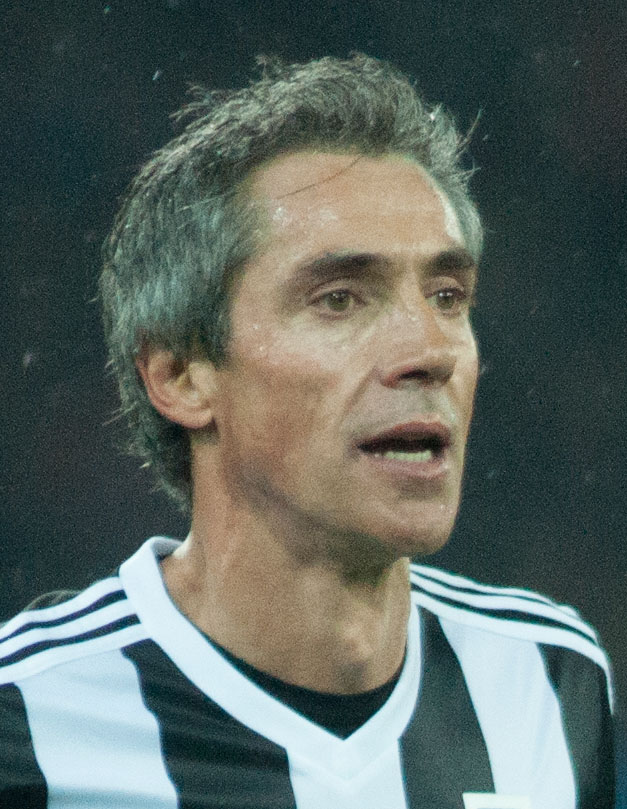
- Sousa in 2014

Personal information
- Full name: Paulo Manuel Carvalho de Sousa
- Date of birth: 30 August 1970 (age 56)
- Place of birth: Viseu, Portugal
- Height: 1.77 m (5 ft 10 in)
- Position: Defensive midfielder

Youth career
- 1984–1986: Repesenses
- 1986–1989: Benfica

Senior career*
| Years | Team | Apps | (Gls) |
| 1989–1993 | Benfica | 86 | (1) |
| 1993–1994 | Sporting CP | 31 | (2) |
| 1994–1996 | Juventus | 54 | (1) |
| 1996–1997 | Borussia Dortmund | 27 | (1) |
| 1998–2000 | Inter Milan | 31 | (0) |
| 2000 | → Parma (loan) | 8 | (0) |
| 2000–2001 | Panathinaikos | 10 | (0) |
| 2002 | Espanyol | 9 | (0) |
| Total | | 256 | (5) |

International career
| 1987 | Portugal U16 | 8 | (0) |
| 1987–1988 | Portugal U18 | 4 | (0) |
| 1989 | Portugal U20 | 2 | (0) |
| 1989–1991 | Portugal U21 | 9 | (1) |
| 1991–2002 | Portugal | 51 | (0) |

Managerial career
- 2005–2008: Portugal U16
- 2008–2009: Queens Park Rangers
- 2009–2010: Swansea City
- 2010: Leicester City
- 2011–2013: Videoton
- 2013–2014: Maccabi Tel Aviv
- 2014–2015: Basel
- 2015–2017: Fiorentina
- 2017–2018: Tianjin Quanjian
- 2019–2020: Bordeaux
- 2021: Poland
- 2021–2022: Flamengo
- 2023: Salernitana
- 2024–2026: Shabab Al Ahli
Medal record
Men's football
Representing Portugal
UEFA European Championship
| Bronze medal – third place | 2000 Belgium-Netherlands |
FIFA U-20 World Cup
| Winner | 1989 Saudi Arabia |
- * Club domestic league appearances and goals

Paulo Manuel Carvalho de Sousa CvIH (Portuguese pronunciation: [ˈpawlu ˈsozɐ]; born 30 August 1970) is a Portuguese football manager and former professional player who played as a defensive midfielder.

Starting his career at Benfica, he also represented Sporting CP in his country, where he amassed Primeira Liga totals of 117 matches and three goals in five years. From there onwards, he competed mainly in Italy and Germany, winning the Champions League with Juventus and Borussia Dortmund and the Intercontinental Cup with the latter side. Injuries severely hampered his later career.

Sousa was a member of Portugal's "Golden Generation", and appeared with the national team at the 2002 World Cup and two European Championships. He took up coaching in the late 2000s, managing clubs in several countries and winning national championships with Maccabi Tel Aviv, Basel and Shabab Al Ahli. He was also in charge of Poland at Euro 2020.

== Club career ==
Born in Viseu, Sousa began playing professionally for Benfica and was a starter from an early age. He won the Primeira Liga championship in 1990–91, and the Taça de Portugal two years later. On 10 April 1993, in a league match at Boavista, he was forced to play in goal after Neno was sent off and his team had no more substitutions left, in an eventual 3–2 win.

In the summer of 1993, Sousa signed for Lisbon neighbours Sporting CP together with his teammate António Pacheco. In his only season, he partnered Luís Figo and Krasimir Balakov in midfield and the Lions did not win any silverware.

Sousa joined Juventus in 1994. In his first season in Turin he won the Serie A title, the domestic cup and the Supercoppa; they also finished as runners-up in the UEFA Cup, losing to fellow Italian side Parma. The following year, he was part of the squad that conquered the UEFA Champions League.

In the 1996 off-season, Sousa moved to Germany with Borussia Dortmund, where he repeated the Champions League triumph the following campaign, which made him only the second player after Marcel Desailly to win back-to-back titles with different teams; the final was against his former club Juventus and, although he appeared in that game, his spell was plagued with injuries, which followed him the remainder of his career.

Sousa subsequently returned to Italy to play for Inter Milan, and eventually retired at the age of 31 after a brief loan to Parma, followed by stints at Panathinaikos and Espanyol.

== International career ==
A member of the Portugal team that won the 1989 FIFA World Youth Championship, Sousa went on to earn 51 caps for the senior side. His international debut came on 16 January 1991, in a friendly against Spain that ended in a 1–1 draw.

Sousa played for his country at UEFA Euro 1996 and 2000, and was a squad member at the 2002 FIFA World Cup, but did not take part in a single match. His last appearance came shortly before the latter competition, a 2–0 friendly win over China.

== Style of play ==
Sousa was a hard-working, tactically intelligent and versatile player who was effective both offensively and defensively, courtesy of his anticipation and ability to read the game. However, he was not known for his speed. Although he was usually classified as a hard-tackling defensive midfielder, he also possessed excellent vision and control and was often deployed as a deep-lying playmaker throughout his career due to his passing accuracy, technique and ability to control the tempo of his teams' play; his playing style drew comparisons with Paulo Roberto Falcão throughout his career.

In addition to his skill and creative abilities, Sousa was also renowned for his leadership.

== Coaching career ==
=== Portugal national teams ===
Sousa began working as a manager by joining the coaching staff of the Portugal national team, taking the helm of the under-16s, and in the summer of 2008 he was appointed assistant to first-team coach Carlos Queiroz, his former boss at Sporting and the Portuguese youths.

=== Queens Park Rangers ===
On 19 November 2008, Sousa was appointed head coach of Championship team Queens Park Rangers. However, on 9 April 2009, he was sacked, as the club claimed he had divulged sensitive information without permission from the hierarchy, which included Dexter Blackstock's loan move to Nottingham Forest having been agreed without his knowledge.

=== Swansea City ===
Following Roberto Martínez's move to Wigan Athletic, Sousa was offered the role as Swansea City manager on 18 June 2009. He verbally accepted the deal, signing a three-year contract, and was officially appointed on the 23rd.

During the league campaign, Sousa led Swansea to its highest league finish for 27 years (seventh), just outside the play-offs. On 4 July 2010, he departed by mutual consent, set to take the vacant post at Leicester City.

=== Leicester City ===
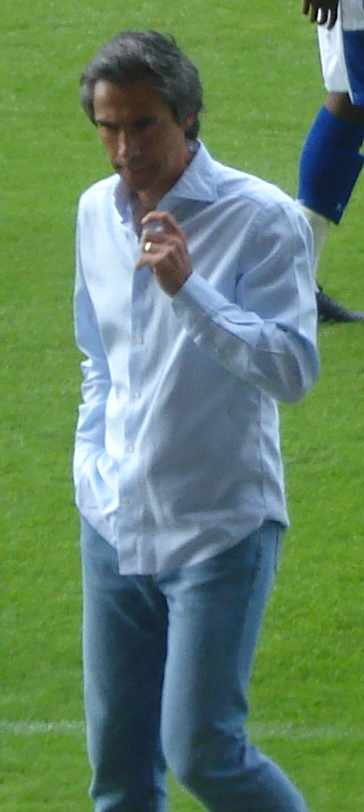
Sousa managing Leicester City in 2010

Sousa became the new manager of Leicester City on 7 July 2010. Owner Milan Mandarić stated that he was delighted to "acquire a manager of such great calibre", adding he was "the right man to take our club forward".

On 1 October 2010, after less than three months in charge, Sousa was fired after a poor start to the season, with the team having won only once in his first nine league games.

=== Videoton ===
On 15 May 2011, Sousa signed a three-year contract with Hungarian club Videoton, newly crowned champions of the Nemzeti Bajnokság I. He made his competitive debut in the Champions League qualifying round to Sturm Graz in a 2–0 away loss, followed by an insufficient 3–2 home win.

His team hosted Trabzonspor in the season's Europa League last qualifying round on 30 August 2012, Sousa's 42nd birthday. After the 4–2 penalty shoot-out victory (0–0 after 120 minutes), he stated: "The qualification was the most beautiful birthday of my life".

On 7 January 2013, Videoton announced they had agreed to terminate Sousa's contract due to family reasons. That same day, it was reported that he would become the new manager of the New York Red Bulls, but nothing came of it.

=== Five clubs in seven years (2013–2020) ===
On 12 June 2013, Maccabi Tel Aviv officially appointed Sousa as its head coach. He won the Israeli Premier League in his only season in charge.

Sousa changed clubs and countries again on 28 May 2014, signing a three-year contract with Basel in the Swiss Super League. He left on 17 June 2015, having again won the national championship.

On 21 June 2015, Sousa joined Serie A side Fiorentina. He left in June 2017 after the appointment of Stefano Pioli.

On 6 November 2017, Sousa signed for Tianjin Quanjian of the Chinese Super League, replacing Fabio Cannavaro. On 4 October of the following year, he left his post.

Sousa became Bordeaux's third coach of the campaign on 8 March 2019 after Gus Poyet and Ricardo Gomes, agreeing to a three-and-a-half-year deal. Having come 12th in his only full season, disputes with the board led to his resignation on 10 August 2020.

=== Poland ===
On 21 January 2021, Polish Football Association (PZPN) president Zbigniew Boniek announced Sousa as the head coach of the Poland national team; he replaced Jerzy Brzęczek, who was dismissed despite achieving qualification for Euro 2020. In his first match in charge, on 25 March, his side drew 3–3 against Hungary in the 2022 World Cup qualification. At the former tournament finals, and despite three goals from star forward Robert Lewandowski, they exited in the group stage; nonetheless, the manager was assured to remain on the job.

Sousa led Poland to second place in their World Cup qualification group, reaching the play-offs but failing to be seeded after losing the last match to Hungary 2–1. The loss caused significant financial losses for the PZPN and the manager was criticised for not fielding several key players, including Lewandowski.

Sousa was allowed to leave on 29 December 2021, after agreeing to pay compensation. Following his departure, he was heavily criticised by Polish media and fans alike, one of the main accusations residing in the fact that he left to another employer when he was offered a better salary, in spite of having stated he would stay for years previously; because of this, he earned the nickname "Siwy Bajerant" (Grey Smooth Talker).

=== Flamengo ===
Hours after leaving the Poland national team, Sousa was announced as the new manager of Flamengo in the Campeonato Brasileiro Série A on a two-year contract. Having observed the first two games of the Campeonato Carioca season, he won 3–0 at home to Boavista on his debut on 2 February 2022; his team lost the final 3–1 on aggregate to rivals Fluminense.

Sousa was dismissed on 9 June 2022, after a 1–0 loss to Red Bull Bragantino.

=== Salernitana ===
On 15 February 2023, Sousa returned to the Italian top division as the new head coach of Salernitana, replacing Davide Nicola. He achieved a 1–1 draw at neighbours and league leaders Napoli on 30 April, momentarily denying them a first Scudetto in 33 years; he was sent off in the final minutes while his team took their unbeaten run to nine games, eventually making it to ten and finally avoiding relegation as 15th.

On 10 October 2023, following a negative start in the campaign, Sousa was dismissed.

=== Shabab Al Ahli ===
On 30 June 2024, Sousa was appointed at UAE Pro League club Shabab Al Ahli. He won four titles in his first season, including the national championship.

== Career statistics ==
=== Club ===
Appearances and goals by club, season and competition
| Club | Season | League | | | Cup | | Continental | | Total | |
| Club | Season | Division | Apps | Goals | Apps | Goals | Apps | Goals | Apps | Goals |
|---|---|---|---|---|---|---|---|---|---|---|
| Benfica | 1989–90 | Primeira Liga | 2 | 0 | 1 | 0 | 0 | 0 | 3 | 0 |
| Benfica | 1990–91 | Primeira Liga | 36 | 0 | 3 | 0 | 2 | 0 | 41 | 0 |
| Benfica | 1991–92 | Primeira Liga | 23 | 1 | 5 | 0 | 3 | 0 | 31 | 1 |
| Benfica | 1992–93 | Primeira Liga | 25 | 0 | 4 | 1 | 6 | 0 | 35 | 1 |
| Benfica | Total | | 86 | 1 | 13 | 1 | 11 | 0 | 110 | 2 |
| Sporting CP | 1993–94 | Primeira Liga | 31 | 2 | 6 | 0 | 6 | 0 | 43 | 2 |
| Juventus | 1994–95 | Serie A | 26 | 1 | 6 | 0 | 10 | 0 | 42 | 1 |
| Juventus | 1995–96 | Serie A | 28 | 0 | 0 | 0 | 8 | 1 | 36 | 1 |
| Juventus | Total | | 54 | 1 | 6 | 0 | 18 | 1 | 78 | 2 |
| Borussia Dortmund | 1996–97 | Bundesliga | 11 | 1 | 0 | 0 | 4 | 0 | 15 | 1 |
| Borussia Dortmund | 1997–98 | Bundesliga | 16 | 0 | 2 | 1 | 5 | 0 | 23 | 1 |
| Borussia Dortmund | Total | | 27 | 1 | 2 | 1 | 9 | 0 | 38 | 2 |
| Inter Milan | 1997–98 | Serie A | 11 | 0 | 0 | 0 | 0 | 0 | 11 | 0 |
| Inter Milan | 1998–99 | Serie A | 10 | 0 | 4 | 0 | 3 | 0 | 17 | 0 |
| Inter Milan | 1999–2000 | Serie A | 10 | 0 | 0 | 0 | 0 | 0 | 10 | 0 |
| Inter Milan | Total | | 31 | 0 | 4 | 0 | 3 | 0 | 38 | 0 |
| Parma (loan) | 1999–2000 | Serie A | 8 | 0 | 0 | 0 | 2 | 0 | 10 | 0 |
| Panathinaikos | 2000–01 | Alpha Ethniki | 6 | 0 | 3 | 0 | 4 | 1 | 13 | 1 |
| Panathinaikos | 2001–02 | Alpha Ethniki | 4 | 0 | 5 | 0 | 7 | 0 | 16 | 0 |
| Panathinaikos | Total | | 10 | 0 | 8 | 0 | 11 | 1 | 29 | 1 |
| Espanyol | 2001–02 | La Liga | 9 | 0 | 0 | 0 | 0 | 0 | 9 | 0 |
| Career total | | | 256 | 5 | 39 | 2 | 60 | 2 | 355 | 9 |

=== International ===
Appearances and goals by national team and year
| National team | Year | Apps | Goals |
|---|---|---|---|
| Portugal | 1991 | 5 | 0 |
| Portugal | 1992 | 0 | 0 |
| Portugal | 1993 | 8 | 0 |
| Portugal | 1994 | 4 | 0 |
| Portugal | 1995 | 6 | 0 |
| Portugal | 1996 | 5 | 0 |
| Portugal | 1997 | 5 | 0 |
| Portugal | 1998 | 2 | 0 |
| Portugal | 1999 | 8 | 0 |
| Portugal | 2000 | 5 | 0 |
| Portugal | 2001 | 2 | 0 |
| Portugal | 2002 | 1 | 0 |
| Total | | 51 | 0 |

== Managerial statistics ==
As of match played 16 May 2026

Managerial record by team and tenure
| Team | From | To | Record | | | | | | | |
| Team | From | To | P | W | D | L | GF | GA | GD | Win % |
|---|---|---|---|---|---|---|---|---|---|---|
| Queens Park Rangers | 19 November 2008 | 9 April 2009 | 26 | 7 | 12 | 7 | 23 | 24 | −1 | 26.92 |
| Swansea City | 23 June 2009 | 4 July 2010 | 49 | 18 | 18 | 13 | 45 | 41 | +4 | 36.73 |
| Leicester City | 7 July 2010 | 1 October 2010 | 12 | 4 | 2 | 6 | 18 | 27 | −9 | 33.33 |
| Videoton | 1 June 2011 | 7 January 2013 | 88 | 52 | 17 | 19 | 140 | 63 | +77 | 59.09 |
| Maccabi Tel Aviv | 11 June 2013 | 28 May 2014 | 49 | 31 | 10 | 8 | 91 | 45 | +46 | 63.27 |
| Basel | 28 May 2014 | 17 June 2015 | 50 | 31 | 8 | 11 | 112 | 60 | +52 | 62.00 |
| Fiorentina | 21 June 2015 | 6 June 2017 | 95 | 43 | 25 | 27 | 154 | 121 | +33 | 45.26 |
| Tianjin Quanjian | 6 November 2017 | 5 October 2018 | 37 | 13 | 10 | 14 | 51 | 58 | −7 | 35.14 |
| Bordeaux | 8 March 2019 | 10 August 2020 | 42 | 13 | 12 | 17 | 53 | 51 | +2 | 30.95 |
| Poland | 21 January 2021 | 29 December 2021 | 15 | 6 | 5 | 4 | 37 | 20 | +17 | 40.00 |
| Flamengo | 29 December 2021 | 9 June 2022 | 32 | 19 | 7 | 6 | 59 | 29 | +30 | 59.38 |
| Salernitana | 15 February 2023 | 10 October 2023 | 25 | 5 | 12 | 8 | 28 | 40 | −12 | 20.00 |
| Shabab Al Ahli | 30 June 2024 | 17 June 2026 | 95 | 58 | 23 | 14 | 205 | 103 | +102 | 61.05 |
| Total | | | 615 | 300 | 161 | 154 | 1,016 | 679 | +337 | 48.78 |

== Honours ==
=== Player ===
Benfica

- Primeira Divisão: 1990–91
- Taça de Portugal: 1992–93
- Supertaça Cândido de Oliveira: 1989

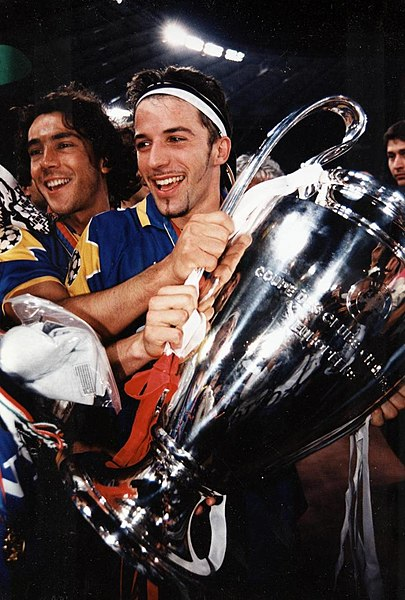
Sousa (left) and Alessandro Del Piero celebrate Juventus winning the Champions League in 1996.

Juventus

- Serie A: 1994–95
- Coppa Italia: 1994–95
- Supercoppa Italiana: 1995
- UEFA Champions League: 1995–96

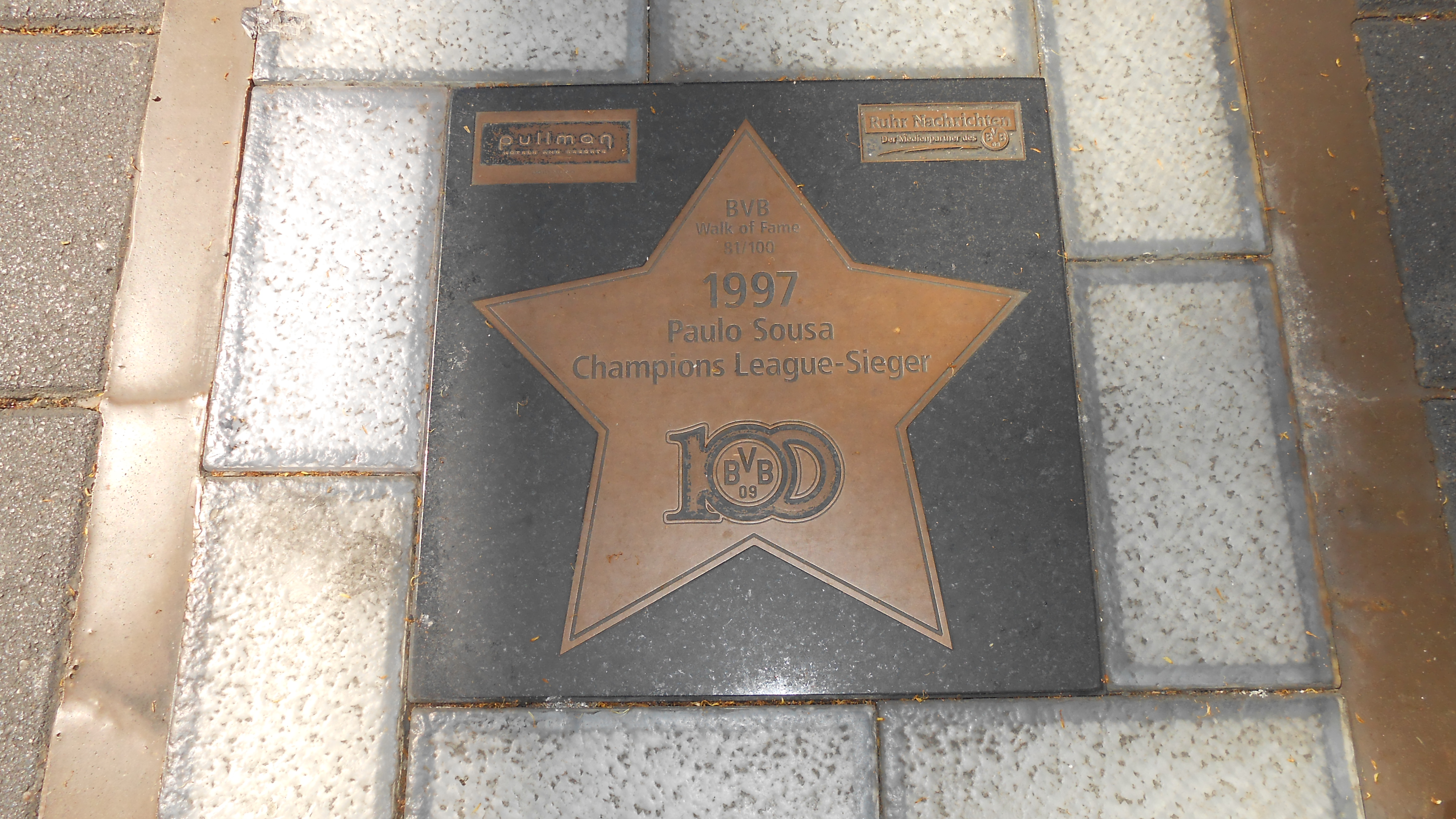
Sousa's star on Borussia Dortmund's Walk of Fame.

Borussia Dortmund

- DFB-Supercup: 1996
- UEFA Champions League: 1996–97
- Intercontinental Cup: 1997

Portugal U20

- FIFA U-20 World Cup: 1989

Portugal

- UEFA European Championship third place: 2000

Individual

- Guerin d'Oro: 1995

=== Manager ===
Videoton

- Ligakupa: 2011–12
- Szuperkupa: 2011, 2012

Maccabi Tel Aviv

- Israeli Premier League: 2013–14

Basel

- Swiss Super League: 2014–15

Shabab Al-Ahli

- UAE Pro League: 2024–25
- UAE President's Cup: 2024–25
- UAE Super Cup: 2024
