= Neno =

Neno may refer to:

- Neno (name), list of nicknames, given names and surnames
- Neno District, a district of Malawi
  - Neno, the capital of the district
