= Neno (name) =

Neno is a Croatian and Serbian given name of Slavic origin that is a diminutive form of Nenad in Croatia and Serbia. It is also a nickname and surname.

== Nickname ==
- Neno (footballer, born 1962), Portuguese professional footballer
- Neno (footballer, born 1988), professional Brazilian football player
- Neno Belan (born 1962), Croatian musician
- Neno Ašćerić, (born 1965), Serbian–Austrian basketball coach and player
- Nazzareno Zamperla, also known as Neno Zamperla, (1937–2020), Italian actor and stuntman

== Given name ==
- Neno DaPrato (1893 – 1984) was an American gridiron football player
- Neno Katulić (born 1975), Croatian footballer
- Neno Mirchev (1909 – ???), Bulgarian gymnast
- Neno Nenov (Bulgarian: Нено Ненов) (born 14 June 1972) is a former Bulgarian footballer
- Neno Kolev Nenovsky (1934 – 2004), Bulgarian judge
- Neno Terziyski (born 1964), Bulgarian weightlifter

== Surname ==
- Emmanuel Neno (born 1957), Pakistani author

== See also ==
- Neno (disambiguation)
- Niño (name)
- Nino (name)
- Nena (given name)
- Nuño
- Nuno (given name)
- Nunn (surname)
- Neko (disambiguation)
- Nelo (disambiguation)
- Nemo (disambiguation)
- Nene (disambiguation)
- Neo (disambiguation)
- Neon (disambiguation)
- Nero (disambiguation)
- Neto (disambiguation)
