= István Szedlacsek =

Hungarian footballer

Personal information
- Date of birth: 26 August 1966 (age 60)
- Position: Forward

Senior career*
Years	Team	Apps	(Gls)
1992–1994	Vác FC		
1994–1995	Olajbányász FC Nagykanizsa		
1995–1996	Vác FC		
- * Club domestic league appearances and goals

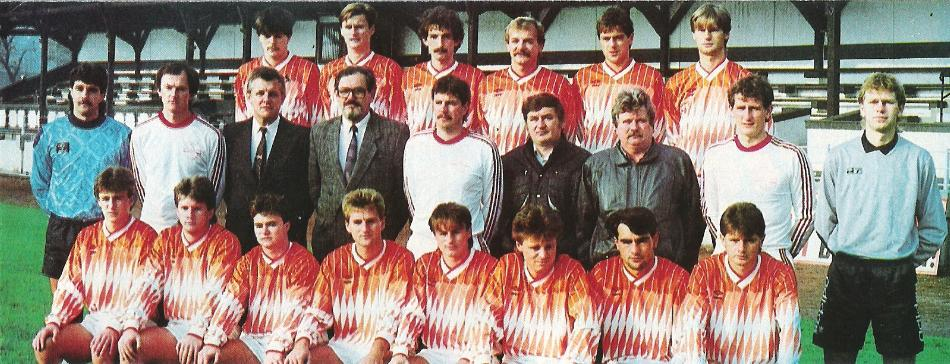
The team of Dorogi Bányász, Szedlacsek in the upper row, third from the left

István Szedlacsek (born 26 August 1966) is a retired Hungarian football striker.
