= Ränneslöv =

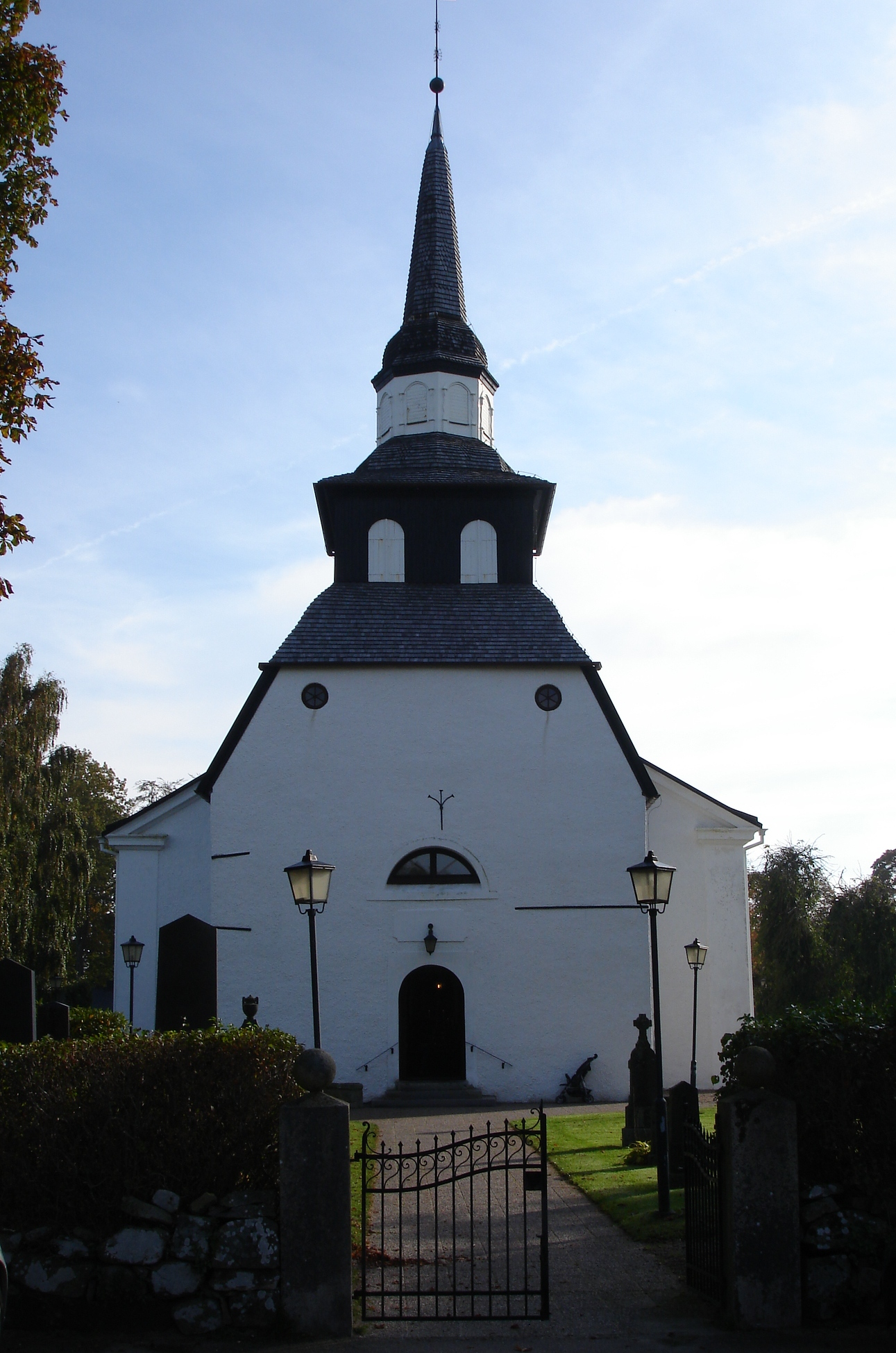

- Location within Halland Location within Sweden
- Coordinates: 56°27′N 13°04′E
- Country: Sweden
- Province: Halland
- County: Halland County
- Municipality: Laholm Municipality

Area
  - Total: 0.69 km^{2} (0.27 sq mi)

Population (31 December 2010)
  - Total: 413
  - Density: 595/km^{2} (1,540/sq mi)
- Time zone: UTC+1 (CET)
  - Summer (DST): UTC+2 (CEST)

Ränneslöv is a locality situated in Laholm Municipality, Halland County, Sweden, with 413 inhabitants in 2010.

== Famous persons from Ränneslöv ==
- Karl-Johan Johnsson

== Sports ==
Ränneslöv have one football team called Ränneslövs GIF
