= Baltasar (footballer) =

Portuguese footballer (born 1966)

Personal information
- Full name: Luís Manuel Alves Rolão Baltasar
- Date of birth: 25 November 1966 (age 59)
- Place of birth: Castelo Branco, Portugal
- Position: Midfielder

Team information
- Current team: Cameroon (assistant)

Youth career
- 1979–1982: Benfica e Castelo Branco
- 1982–1985: Sporting

Senior career*
Years	Team	Apps	(Gls)
1984–1985	Sporting	0	(0)
1985–1986	Vitória de Setúbal	14	(1)
1986–1987	União da Madeira		
1987–1988	Académica de Coimbra	7	(0)
1988–1989	Olivais e Moscavide		
1989–1993	Torreense		
1993–1994	Louletano		
1994–1998	Braga	98	(6)
1998–2000	Belenenses	41	(3)
2000–2002	Estoril		
2002–2003	Atlético CP		

Managerial career
- 2003–2004: Naval 1º de Maio (assistant)
- 2004–2006: Estrela da Amadora (assistant)
- 2006–2007: Vitória de Setúbal (assistant)
- 2007–2008: Trofense (assistant)
- 2009: CFR Cluj (assistant)
- 2010: Belenenses (assistant)
- 2010–2011: Brașov (assistant)
- 2012: Astra Ploiești (assistant)
- 2012–2013: Braga B (assistant)
- 2013–2014: Moreirense (assistant)
- 2014–2015: Olhanense (assistant)
- 2015: Al-Faisaly (assistant)
- 2015–2016: CFR Cluj (assistant)
- 2017: Nea Salamis (assistant)
- 2017: Penafiel (assistant)
- 2018–2019: CFR Cluj (assistant)
- 2019–: Cameroon (assistant)
- * Club domestic league appearances and goals

Luís Manuel Alves Rolão Baltasar, known as Baltasar (born 25 November 1966), is a Portuguese football coach and a former player. He is the assistant manager of Cameroon national team.

He played eight seasons and 171 games in the Primeira Liga for Braga, Torreense, Belenenses, Vitória de Setúbal and Académica de Coimbra.

== Playing career ==
Baltasar made his Primeira Liga debut for Vitória de Setúbal on 7 September 1985 as a second-half substitute in a 3–1 victory over Sporting Covilhã.

== Coaching career ==
As assistant coach of Toni Conceição at CFR Cluj he won the Romanian Cup for two times (2009, 2016), the Romanian Supercup (2009).

In Portugal, Baltasar and Conceição won the Segunda Liga for two times; in 2008 with Trofense and in 2014 with Moreirense.
