= João Pires (footballer) =

Portuguese footballer

Personal information
- Full name: João António Gonçalves Correia Pires
- Date of birth: 19 November 1970 (age 55)
- Place of birth: Cascais, Portugal
- Height: 1.72 m (5 ft 7 1/2 in)
- Position: Left winger

Youth career
- 1983–1986: Alapraia
- 1986–1989: Benfica

Senior career*
Years	Team	Apps	(Gls)
1989–1992	Benfica	1	(0)
1989–1991	→ Estoril-Praia (loan)	65	(4)
1992–1994	Estoril-Praia	27	(0)
1994–1999	Académica	78	(5)
1999	Alverca	18	(0)
1999–2000	Estrela Amadora	2	(0)
2000–2002	Estoril-Praia	25	(1)
Total		216	(10)

International career
1987	Portugal U16	7	(1)
1991	Portugal U21	1	(0)
- * Club domestic league appearances and goals

João António Gonçalves Correia Pires (born 19 November 1970) is a Portuguese retired footballer who played as a left winger.

Developed at Benfica, he amassed 71 Primeira Liga appearances, spending six years at Estoril-Praia and five and half at Académica. Pires also earned 8 caps for Portugal from under–16 to under–21 level.

== Football career ==
Born in Cascais, Pires started at Sporting Alapraia, spending three seasons there before finishing his development at Benfica in 1989. His first two seasons as a professional were on a loan deal to Estoril-Praia, where he help them win promotion to the first tier in 1990–91, with 37 appearances and three goals.

In 1991, he was recalled to Benfica but only played twice during the season, a first round match for the European Cup against Hamrun Spartans and a league game against Marítimo on match-day 24. He left the club the following year and rejoined Estoril-Praia, where he battled with Ilia Voynov for the left winger role in the starting XI, playing 27 league games during two seasons.

In 1994, the 24 year-old moved to Académica and spent five and half years there, winning promotion in 1996–97, amassing nearly 80 league caps between the second and the top tier. In January 1999, he signed a two-year deal with Alverca, helping them finish 14th and avoid relegation. He changed teams again during the summer, moving to Estrela Amadora on 17 June 1999, after terminating his contract with Alverca.

Suffering from lack of opportunities, in June 2000, he was contacted by Estoril, as he admitted: "I was contacted by the Estoril management, but right now, I still need to fix my situation with Estrela da Amadora, as I have another year in my contract.". After agreeing the move, Pires was regularly used in the first year, retiring a year later, at 32.
