= Nelo (disambiguation) =

Nelo is a Portuguese canoe and kayak manufacturer.

Nelo may also refer to:

- Nelo (moth), a genus of moths in the family Geometridae
- Nelo (band), an alternative rock band

== People ==
- Nelo Vingada (born 1953), Portuguese football manager
- Nelo Risi (1920–2015), Italian poet and film director
- Nelo (Portuguese footballer) (born 1967)
