= Ränneslövs GIF =

Swedish football club

- Full name: Ränneslövs Gymanstik och Idrottsförening
- Nicknames: RGIF, Ränneslöv
- Founded: 1945; 81 years ago
- Ground: Björkvallen; Ränneslöv; Sweden
- Chairman: Monica Ottosson
- Head coach: Ulf Wernersson
- League: Division 4 Halland
- 2010: Division 4 Halland, 8th
Home colours	Away colours

Ränneslövs GIF is a Swedish football club located in Ränneslöv, Halland.

== Background ==
The club was founded as Ränneslövs Bollklubb in 1934, but it ceased to operate when the World War 2 broke out in 1939. However the last elected board felt responsible for the coming years and in early 1945 they started trying to get the club up and running again. They succeeded, and on 21 August 1945 they had an annual meeting when they decided that the new name for the club should be Ränneslövs GIF (in English: Ränneslövs Gymnastics and Sports Association).

Since their foundation Ränneslövs GIF has participated mainly in the lower divisions of the Swedish football league system. The club currently plays in Division 4 Halland which is the sixth tier of Swedish football. They play their home matches at the Björkvallen in Ränneslöv.

Ränneslövs GIF are affiliated to the Hallands Fotbollförbund. The home colours of Ränneslöv is green and white hoops and white shorts. The away kit is yellow.

The keeper of Halmstad BK, Karl-Johan Johnsson played in Ränneslöv when he was younger.

== Season to season ==
Season	Level	Division	Section	Position	Movements
1999	Tier 6	Division 5	Halland Södra	2nd	
2000	Tier 6	Division 5	Halland Södra	8th	
2001	Tier 6	Division 5	Halland Södra	11th	Relegated
2002	Tier 7	Division 6	Halland Södra	1st	Promoted
2003	Tier 6	Division 5	Halland Södra	8th	
2004	Tier 6	Division 5	Halland Södra	2nd	Promotion Playoffs – Promoted
2005	Tier 5	Division 4	Halland	11th	Relegated
2006*	Tier 7	Division 5	Halland Södra	4th	
2007	Tier 7	Division 5	Halland Södra	3rd	Promoted
2008	Tier 6	Division 4	Halland	13th	Relegated
2009	Tier 7	Division 5	Halland Södra	2nd	Promotion Playoffs – Promoted
2010	Tier 6	Division 4	Halland	8th	
2011	Tier 6	Division 4	Halland	9th	

* League restructuring in 2006 resulted in a new division being created at Tier 3 and subsequent divisions dropping a level.

== Attendances ==
In recent seasons Ränneslövs GIF have had the following average attendances:

Season	Average attendance	Division / Section	Level
2008	Not available	Div 4 Halland	Tier 6
2009	69	Div 5 Halland Södra	Tier 7
2010	43	Div 4 Halland	Tier 6

* Attendances are provided in the Publikliga sections of the Svenska Fotbollförbundet website.
