= Makpoloka Mangonga =

Democratic Republic of the Congo footballer

Personal information
- Full name: Makpoloka Mangonga
- Date of birth: 3 September 1968 (age 58)
- Place of birth: Zaïre
- Positions: Winger; forward

Senior career*
Years	Team	Apps	(Gls)
- AS Béziers Hérault
1988-1989	F.C. Paços de Ferreira	24	(4)
1989-1995	Gil Vicente F.C.	164	(32)
1995-1996	F.C. Tirsense	17	(2)
1996-1998	S.C. Beira-Mar	56	(8)
1998-1999	Académico de Viseu F.C.	29	(6)
1999/2000	Sporting Clube de Cambres		
2000/2001	C.F. Fão		

International career
1994	Democratic Republic of the Congo	1	(0)
- * Club domestic league appearances and goals

Makpoloka Mangonga (born 3 September 1968) is a Democratic Republic of the Congo retired footballer.

== Career ==
Starting his senior career at AS Béziers Hérault in the French third division, Mangonga was wanted by Ligue 1 clubs Girondins de Bordeaux and Montpellier HSC but ended up playing for Paços de Ferreira in the Portuguese second division due to transfer difficulties.

After playing for Paços de Ferreira, he trained with Porto, the second most successful Portuguese team, before signing with Gil Vicente in the second division. In 1995, Mangonga was released from Gil Vicente. The way he was dismissed by the club, coupled with family problems, soured his relationship with football and he never visited a stadium since retirement.
