= João Pires (politician) =

Brazilian politician (born 1998)

Member of the Legislative Assembly of Rio de Janeiro
- Incumbent
- Assumed office 1 February 2027

Personal details
- Born: 15 April 1998 (age 28)
- Party: Social Democratic Party

João Vitor Pires Nascimento (born 15 April 1998) is a Brazilian politician who was elected member of the Legislative Assembly of Rio de Janeiro in 2026. He has served as secretary of consumer protection and defense of Rio de Janeiro since 2025.
