= Rui Esteves =

Portuguese footballer

Personal information
- Full name: Rui Manuel Guerreiro Nobre Esteves
- Date of birth: 30 January 1967 (age 59)
- Place of birth: Lisbon, Portugal
- Height: 1.82 m (5 ft 11 1/2 in)
- Position: Attacking midfielder

Youth career
- 1983–1985: Real Benfica

Senior career*
Years	Team	Apps	(Gls)
1985–1986	Torreense		
1986–1988	Olhanense		
1988–1990	Louletano	45	(2)
1990–1991	Farense	6	(0)
1991–1992	Louletano	29	(0)
1992–1993	Torreense	31	(6)
1993–1994	Vitória Setúbal	28	(2)
1994–1995	Benfica	2	(0)
1995	→ Birmingham City (loan)	0	(0)
1995–1997	Belenenses	57	(3)
1998–1999	Daewoo Royals	10	(0)
2000	Beijing Guoan	0	(0)

Managerial career
- 2001–2002: Fazendense
- 2002–2003: Alcochetense
- 2004: Olivais Moscavide
- 2004: Sintrense
- 2005: Beira-Mar Monte Gordo
- 2005–2006: Portosantense
- 2006: Maia
- 2006–2007: Torreense
- 2008–2009: Fabril
- 2009–2010: Farense
- * Club domestic league appearances and goals

Rui Manuel Guerreiro Nobre Esteves (born 30 January 1967) is a Portuguese retired professional footballer who played as an attacking midfielder.

He amassed Primeira Liga totals of 93 matches and five goals during five seasons, in representation of Farense, Vitória de Setúbal, Benfica and Belenenses.

== Playing career ==
Born in Lisbon, Esteves started playing professionally at the age of 18, representing several teams in the Portuguese second division, most of them hailing from the Algarve region: S.C.U. Torreense, S.C. Olhanense and Louletano DC. His Primeira Liga debut occurred in the 1990–91 season, but he appeared just six times for S.C. Farense and resumed his career in the second level, representing old acquaintances Louletano and Torreense.

Late in 1994, after having helped Vitória de Setúbal finish sixth in the top flight, Esteves earned himself a transfer to S.L. Benfica, but never settled with his hometown club, playing for a third side in the campaign as he was loaned to England's Birmingham City, although his only match for Blues was a 45-minute appearance in the Football League Trophy against Leyton Orient. He returned to Portugal in the following summer, spending two years with Benfica neighbours C.F. Os Belenenses also in the top tier, and closed out his career at 33 after spells in Asia, with K-League's Daewoo Royals and in the Chinese Jia-A League with Beijing Guoan FC.

== Coaching career ==
Esteves began working as a coach in 2001, starting with Associação Desportiva Fazendense and going on to be in charge of Grupo Desportivo Alcochetense and C.D. Olivais e Moscavide in the following two years. In December 2008 he was appointed at G.D. Fabril, and never managed in higher than division three.
