= Pedro Roma =

Portuguese football player/coach

Personal information
- Full name: Pedro Miguel da Mota Roma
- Date of birth: 13 August 1970 (age 56)
- Place of birth: Pombal, Portugal
- Height: 1.85 m (6 ft 1 in)
- Position: Goalkeeper

Youth career
- 1982–1986: Sporting Pombal
- 1986–1989: Académica

Senior career*
Years	Team	Apps	(Gls)
1989–1990	Naval		
1990–1992	Académica	33	(0)
1992–1994	Benfica	0	(0)
1993–1994	→ Gil Vicente (loan)	6	(0)
1994–2009	Académica	332	(0)
1996	→ Famalicão (loan)	12	(0)
2002	→ Braga (loan)	3	(0)
Total		386	(0)

International career
1991–1992	Portugal U21	2	(0)
- * Club domestic league appearances and goals

Pedro Miguel da Mota Roma (born 13 August 1970) is a Portuguese former footballer who played as a goalkeeper.

Having played with Académica for over 15 years, he later worked with his main club as a goalkeepers' coach.

== Football career ==
Born in Pombal, Leiria District, Roma came up through the youth ranks of Académica de Coimbra. He made his professional debut for the club in 1991, after a spell at Associação Naval 1º de Maio in the lower leagues.

After two successful seasons, Primeira Liga giants S.L. Benfica bought Roma. However, he failed to make a single appearance for the Lisbon side, and was subsequently loaned to fellow top division team Gil Vicente FC, where he played sparingly.

After 1993–94, Roma returned to Académica, where he stayed for another two seasons. After a disappointing second year he was loaned out to F.C. Famalicão but, upon coming back to Coimbra, he made a record 147 appearances in a row for the Students, and was first choice for six consecutive seasons; after a brief loan spell at S.C. Braga in 2002, where he made only three appearances, he returned and remained the starter for the subsequent campaigns.

In June 2009, after having only appeared in two games during the season, Roma retired aged almost 39, and immediately became Académica's goalkeeper's coach. In the following years, in the same capacity, he worked with the Portugal national team (women, under-17s).
