= Neno (footballer, born 1962) =

Portuguese footballer (1962–2021)

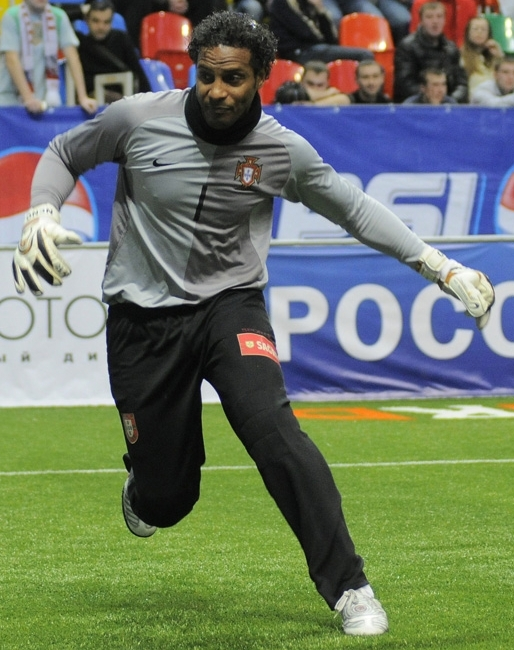
- Neno at the 2011 Legends Cup

Personal information
- Full name: Adelino Augusto da Graça Barbosa Barros
- Date of birth: 27 January 1962
- Place of birth: Cidade Velha, Cape Verde
- Date of death: 10 June 2021 (aged 59)
- Place of death: Guimarães, Portugal
- Height: 1.82 m (6 ft 0 in)
- Position: Goalkeeper

Youth career
- 1975–1978: Santoantoniense
- 1978–1981: Barreirense

Senior career*
Years	Team	Apps	(Gls)
1981–1984	Barreirense	81	(0)
1984–1985	Vitória Guimarães	21	(0)
1985–1987	Benfica	2	(0)
1987–1988	Vitória Setúbal	6	(0)
1988–1990	Vitória Guimarães	58	(0)
1990–1995	Benfica	98	(0)
1995–1999	Vitória Guimarães	57	(0)
Total		323	(0)

International career
1989–1996	Portugal	9	(0)
- * Club domestic league appearances and goals

Adelino Augusto da Graça Barbosa Barros (27 January 1962 – 10 June 2021), known as Neno, was a Portuguese professional footballer who played as a goalkeeper.

He appeared in 242 Primeira Liga games over 15 seasons, representing mainly Vitória de Guimarães and Benfica.

== Club career ==
Born in Cidade Velha, Portuguese Cape Verde to a teacher and a housewife as one of seven siblings, Neno started his career with F.C. Barreirense, moving to Vitória S.C. in 1984. After one season, already in the Primeira Liga, he signed with S.L. Benfica, originally backing up legendary Manuel Bento.

After a single campaign at Vitória F.C. and a second spell at Guimarães, Neno rejoined Benfica, going on to experience an interesting battle for first-choice status with Silvino, who also played with both Vitória sides (but not in the same periods); he was the starter in most of 1990–91 and the entire 1993–94, which finished with victory in the league.

Following Michel Preud'homme's move to the Estádio da Luz after the 1994 FIFA World Cup, Neno backed him up for one season, but left in 1996 to finish his career with his second club, retiring at 37. Subsequently, he continued to work there in a directorial capacity, while also acting as Vitória SC's goalkeeper coach.

== International career ==
Neno won nine caps for the Portugal national team, his debut coming on 8 June 1989 in a 4–0 friendly defeat against Brazil. His last game was a 3–2 loss to France on 24 January 1996 in another exhibition game, and he would miss selection for UEFA Euro 1996 due to having lost the number one position at his club to younger Nuno Espírito Santo.

== Death ==
On 10 June 2021, Neno died after suffering a heart attack at the parish where he lived, in the village of Polvoreira in Guimarães, at the age of 59.

== Honours ==
Benfica

- Primeira Liga: 1986–87, 1990–91, 1993–94
- Taça de Portugal: 1985–86, 1986–87, 1992–93

Vitória de Guimarães

- Supertaça Cândido de Oliveira: 1988
