= Silvino Louro =

Portuguese footballer (1959–2026)

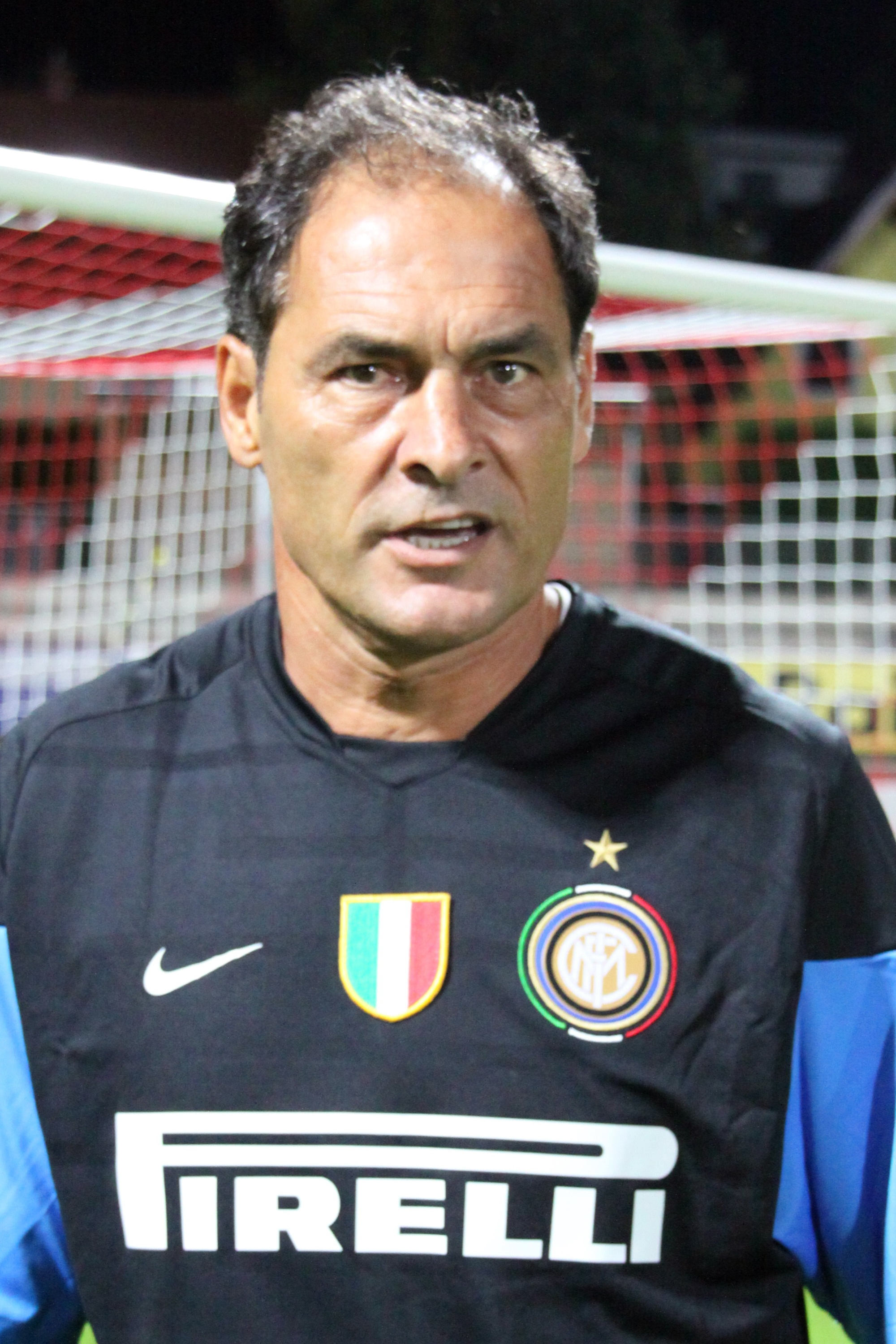
- Silvino with Inter Milan in 2009

Personal information
- Full name: Silvino de Almeida Louro
- Date of birth: 5 March 1959
- Place of birth: Setúbal, Portugal
- Date of death: 19 March 2026 (aged 67)
- Place of death: Madrid, Spain
- Height: 1.82 m (6 ft 0 in)
- Position: Goalkeeper

Youth career
- 1965–1977: Vitória Setúbal

Senior career*
Years	Team	Apps	(Gls)
1977–1982	Vitória Setúbal	64	(0)
1982–1984	Vitória Guimarães	47	(0)
1984–1994	Benfica	184	(0)
1985–1986	→ Aves (loan)	34	(0)
1994–1995	Vitória Setúbal	32	(0)
1995–1997	Porto	13	(0)
1997–2000	Salgueiros	34	(0)
Total		408	(0)

International career
1979–1983	Portugal U21	8	(0)
1983–1997	Portugal	23	(0)
- * Club domestic league appearances and goals

Silvino de Almeida Louro (5 March 1959 – 19 March 2026), known simply as Silvino in his playing days, was a Portuguese professional footballer who played as a goalkeeper.

He ended his extensive career in his 40s, having taken part in 21 Primeira Liga seasons and made 408 appearances in the competition. He went on to work as a first-team coach under José Mourinho.

== Club career ==
Born in Setúbal, Silvino started his professional career with hometown's Vitória de Setúbal in 1977. He moved to Vitória de Guimarães after five years at the club.

Silvino was signed by Benfica for 1984–85, but did not appear once in that year's Primeira Liga, barred by Manuel Bento. After a loan to newly promoted Aves in the following campaign, he returned, going on to have an interesting battle for first-choice status with Neno for several seasons and helping the team to win four league titles.

Silvino played in the European Cup finals in 1988 and 1990, having captained the side in the latter. He rejoined Vitória Setúbal in 1994 upon leaving Benfica, then moved to Porto for the 1995–96 season: despite not having to face competition from Vítor Baía in his second year (as Baía had left for Barcelona) he featured rarely during his stint, and closed out his career at northern neighbours Salgueiros, retiring in June 2000 aged 41.

Subsequently, Louro began a career as a goalkeeping coach, successively at Porto, Chelsea, Inter Milan, Real Madrid and Manchester United, always under countryman José Mourinho. Several of the goalkeepers he worked directly with (Baía, Petr Čech and Júlio César) went on to win the Best Goalkeeper award, given by UEFA.

== International career ==
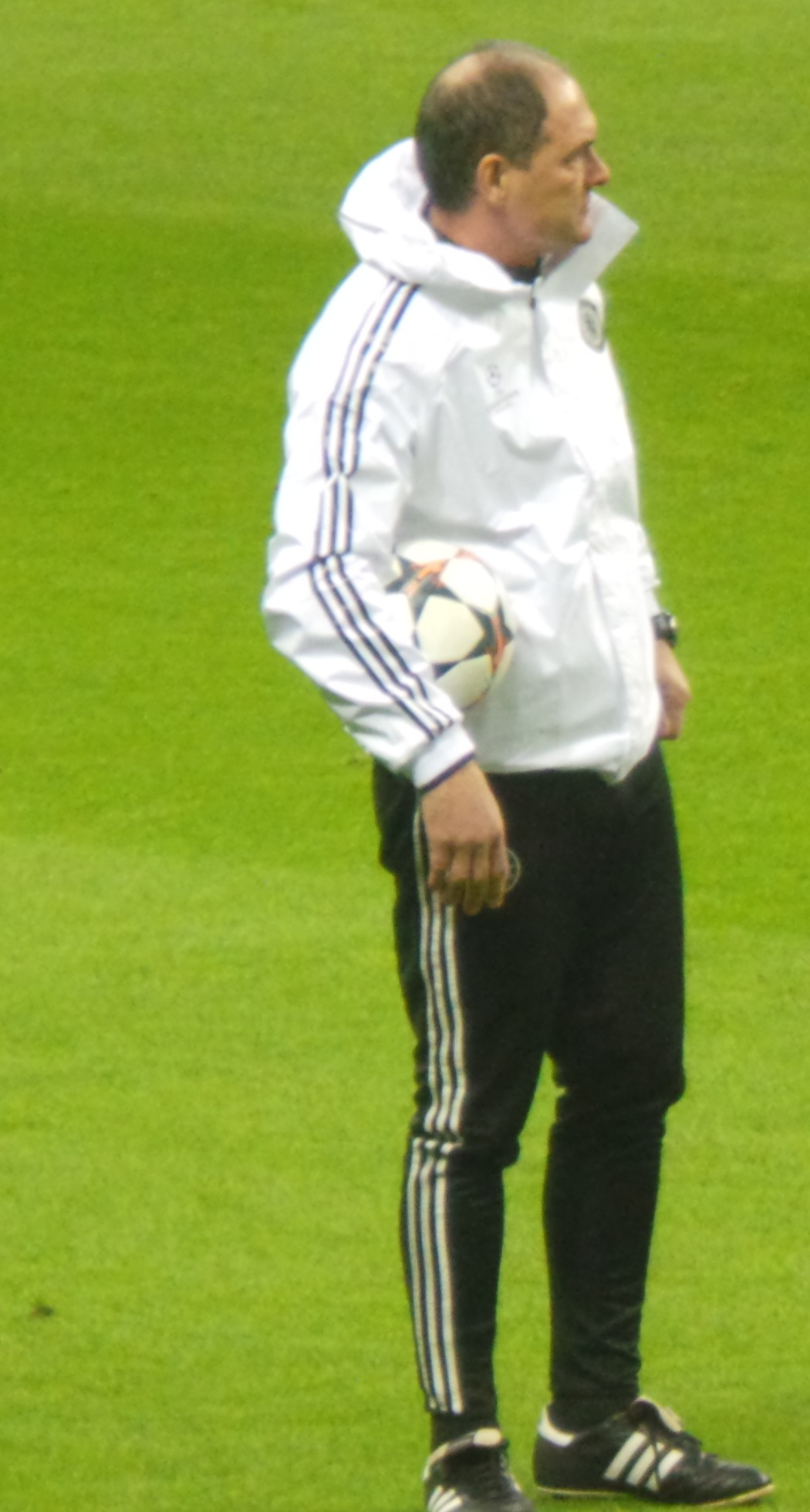
Louro during his time with Chelsea

Silvino made his debut for Portugal as a Vitória Guimarães player, in a 0–0 draw with Hungary on 13 April 1983. He won a total of 23 caps in a career spanning 14 years, but was left out of the nation's UEFA Euro 1984 squad.

Silvino returned to the national team on 12 October 1988, and played a major part in their 1990 FIFA World Cup qualifying campaign. He lost the number one shirt in January 1991 to young Baía, as a result of having lost his Benfica job to Neno, and spent the vast remainder of his international career on the substitutes' bench.

However, after Porto's Baía suffered an injury, Silvino played the last two games of the 1998 World Cup qualifiers; his final appearance came in the 1–0 win over Northern Ireland on 11 October 1997 – aged 38 – as he equalised Vítor Damas's record as the oldest player to represent Portugal.

From 2000 to 2002, prior to his Porto appointment, Louro was the goalkeeper coach for the national team.

== Death ==
Silvino died after a prolonged illness on 19 March 2026, at the age of 67.

== Honours ==
Benfica

- Primeira Liga: 1986–87, 1988–89, 1990–91, 1993–94
- Taça de Portugal: 1984–85, 1986–87, 1992–93
- Supertaça Cândido de Oliveira: 1989
- European Cup runner-up: 1987–88, 1989–90

Porto

- Primeira Liga: 1995–96, 1996–97
- Supertaça Cândido de Oliveira: 1996
