= Abel Silva =

Portuguese football coach and former player

Personal information
- Full name: Abel Jorge Pereira da Silva
- Date of birth: 21 August 1969 (age 57)
- Place of birth: Lisbon, Portugal
- Height: 1.69 m (5 ft 7 in)
- Position: Right back

Youth career
- 1978–1984: Atlético
- 1984–1988: Benfica

Senior career*
Years	Team	Apps	(Gls)
1988–1994	Benfica	16	(1)
1989–1990	→ Académica (loan)	14	(2)
1990–1991	→ Penafiel (loan)	33	(1)
1991–1992	→ Marítimo (loan)	22	(0)
1993-1995	→ S.L. Benfica	21	(0)
1995	Vitória Setúbal	9	(0)
1995–1996	Felgueiras	23	(0)
1996–1997	Campomaiorense	21	(0)
1997–1998	Estoril	20	(0)
1998–2000	Alverca	39	(0)
2000–2001	Atlético	9	
Total		227	(4)

International career
1989	Portugal U20	5	(1)
1989–1991	Portugal U21	13	(0)

Managerial career
- 2004–2005: Benfica (assistant)
- 2005–2007: Al-Nassr (assistant)
- 2007: Famalicão (assistant)
- 2007–2008: Portosantense
Medal record
Men's football
Representing Portugal
FIFA U-20 World Cup
Winner	1989 Saudi Arabia
- * Club domestic league appearances and goals

Abel Jorge Pereira da Silva CvIH (born 21 August 1969), sometimes known as just Abel, is a Portuguese former footballer.

One of the players who scored (both editions combined) goals in Portugal's two consecutive U-20 World Cup triumphs, the right back played for a total of ten clubs.

He started his career with Benfica, where he later worked as an assistant coach and a scout after amassing Primeira Liga totals of 142 matches and two goals over the course of nine seasons.

== Playing career ==
In 1987, at the age of 18, Lisbon-born Abel was invited to play for S.L. Benfica's youth sides, where he performed well winning many awards, moving to the first team after just one season. He was on squad for Portugal when it won the 1989 FIFA World Youth Championship, scoring the opener in the final against Nigeria (2–0).

After an unspectacular first year, only playing one game (his debut came against S.C. Braga, on 2 April 1989, in a 1–0 win), Silva transferred to Académica de Coimbra from the second division on loan, where he was given his first real chance as a senior. His next stop was at F.C. Penafiel, also on loan, where he started most of the year to help them avoid top level relegation, ultimately netting his penultimate goal as a professional.

Abel experienced a final loan spell with C.S. Marítimo also in the Primeira Liga, in the 1991–92 campaign, then returned to Benfica. In January 1995 he was finally released and joined Vitória FC, where he remained until the end of the season.

Subsequently, Silva represented F.C. Felgueiras, S.C. Campomaiorense, G.D. Estoril Praia, F.C. Alverca and Atlético Clube de Portugal – the latter in division three – with an average of about 20 appearances per year, before retiring from the game in June 2001 at nearly 32.

== Coaching career ==
In the 2004–05 season, Abel took up coaching, being part of Giovanni Trapattoni's staff as Benfica put an end to an 11-year drought and won the national league. After more assistant spells, with F.C. Famalicão and Al-Nassr FC, he began his head coaching career in 2007, with lowly C.D. Portosantense.

On two separate spells, Abel worked with Benfica as scout.
