= Paulo Madeira =

Portuguese footballer

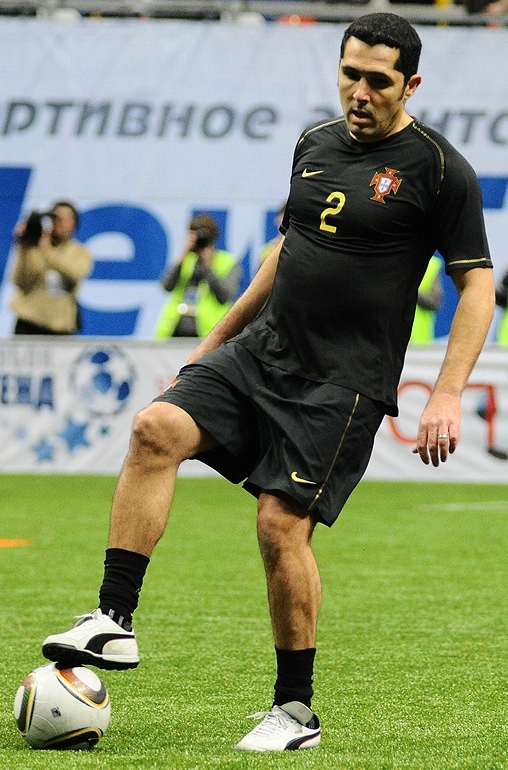
- Madeira at the 2011 Legends Cup

Personal information
- Full name: Paulo Sérgio Braga Madeira
- Date of birth: 6 September 1970 (age 56)
- Place of birth: Luanda, Portuguese Angola
- Height: 1.83 m (6 ft 0 in)
- Position: Centre back

Youth career
- 1982–1987: Lusitano
- 1987–1989: Benfica

Senior career*
Years	Team	Apps	(Gls)
1989–1995	Benfica	75	(1)
1993–1994	→ Marítimo (loan)	32	(3)
1995–1997	Belenenses	64	(5)
1997–2002	Benfica	94	(3)
2002–2003	Fluminense	0	(0)
2003–2004	Estrela Amadora	26	(0)
Total		291	(12)

International career
1987	Portugal U16	12	(1)
1988	Portugal U18	6	(0)
1989	Portugal U20	6	(0)
1989–1990	Portugal U21	17	(2)
1991–1999	Portugal	25	(3)
Medal record
Men's football
Representing Portugal
FIFA U-20 World Cup
Winner	1989 Saudi Arabia
- * Club domestic league appearances and goals

Paulo Sérgio Braga Madeira CvIH (born 6 September 1970) is a Portuguese former professional footballer who played as a central defender.

== Club career ==
Madeira was born in Luanda, Portuguese Angola. A youth graduate of S.L. Benfica, he made his first-team debut in 1989–90 and, after serving a loan with fellow Primeira Liga club C.S. Marítimo, returned for another season.

After excellent displays with Lisbon neighbours C.F. Os Belenenses, Madeira was bought back by Benfica, but failed to appear regularly in his second spell with his alma mater (five years), which included a demotion to the reserves. He retired at almost 34 after brief stints with Fluminense FC and C.F. Estrela da Amadora, with the campaign ending in relegation; over the course of 13 seasons, he amassed top-division (the only competition he appeared in in his country) totals of 291 games and 12 goals.

== International career ==
At international level, Madeira was part of the Portugal senior team that participated at UEFA Euro 1996, although he did not leave the bench. In total, he earned 25 caps and scored three goals in eight years.

Previously, Madeira was instrumental in helping the under-20 side to the 1989 FIFA World Youth Championship in Saudi Arabia, playing all the matches.

Paulo Madeira: International goals
Goal	Date	Venue	Opponent	Score	Result	Competition
1	26 March 1999	D. Afonso Henriques, Guimarães, Portugal	Azerbaijan	3–0	7–0	Euro 2000 qualifying
2	31 March 1999	Sportpark Eschen-Mauren, Eschen, Liechtenstein	Liechtenstein	0–3	0–5	Euro 2000 qualifying
3	31 March 1999	Sportpark Eschen-Mauren, Eschen, Liechtenstein	Liechtenstein	0–4	0–5	Euro 2000 qualifying

== Honours ==
=== Player ===
Benfica

- Primeira Divisão: 1990–91
- Taça de Portugal: 1992–93
- Supertaça Cândido de Oliveira: 1989

Portugal U20

- FIFA U-20 World Cup: 1989
