= 1989 USSR Federation Cup =

1989 Cup of Football Federation of USSR
USSR Federation Cup

Tournament details
- Host country: Soviet Union
- Dates: 26 February to 5 November
- Teams: 16

Final positions
- Champions: (Ukrainian Soviet Socialist Republic) Dnepr Dnepropetrovsk (2nd title)
- Runners-up: (Byelorussian Soviet Socialist Republic) Dinamo Minsk

Tournament statistics
- Matches played: 49
- Goals scored: 129 (2.63 per match)
- Top scorer(s): (5) - Mikhail Markhel, Syarhey Herasimets (both Dinamo Mn.)

The 1989 USSR Federation Cup was the fourth edition of the USSR Federation Cup and was officially known as Cup of the USSR Football Union. It took place between 26 February to 5 November. Its final was played at Meteor Stadium in Dnepropetrovsk.

== Group stage ==
=== Group A ===
Pos	Team	Pld	W	D	L	GF	GA	GD	Pts	DNI	ROT	ARA	ZEN
1	(Ukrainian Soviet Socialist Republic) Dnepr Dnepropetrovsk	6	4	0	2	7	4	+3	8	—	2–1	2–0	1–0
2	(Russian Soviet Federative Socialist Republic) Rotor Volgograd	6	3	1	2	9	6	+3	7	1–0	—	5–0	2–1
3	(Armenian Soviet Socialist Republic) Ararat Yerevan	6	3	0	3	7	11	−4	6	1–0	+:-	—	2–1
4	(Russian Soviet Federative Socialist Republic) Zenit Leningrad	6	1	1	4	6	8	−2	3	1–2	0–0	3–1	—

=== Group B ===
Pos	Team	Pld	W	D	L	GF	GA	GD	Pts	DIN	TOR	SPA	LOK
1	(Russian Soviet Federative Socialist Republic) Dinamo Moscow	6	4	1	1	14	8	+6	9	—	4–1	0–1	3–1
2	(Russian Soviet Federative Socialist Republic) Torpedo Moscow	6	4	0	2	13	8	+5	8	1–2	—	3–0	4–1
3	(Russian Soviet Federative Socialist Republic) Spartak Moscow	6	3	1	2	8	9	−1	7	2–2	1–2	—	2–1
4	(Russian Soviet Federative Socialist Republic) Lokomotiv Moscow	6	0	0	6	6	16	−10	0	2–3	0–2	1–2	—

=== Group C ===
Pos	Team	Pld	W	D	L	GF	GA	GD	Pts	SHA	CHE	MET	DIN
1	(Ukrainian Soviet Socialist Republic) Shakhter Donetsk	6	5	1	0	13	2	+11	11	—	1–0	6–0	1–0
2	(Ukrainian Soviet Socialist Republic) Chernomorets Odessa	6	3	1	2	8	3	+5	7	0–2	—	4–0	+:-
3	(Ukrainian Soviet Socialist Republic) Metallist Kharkov	6	1	1	4	2	13	−11	3	1–2	0–1	—	0–0
4	(Ukrainian Soviet Socialist Republic) Dinamo Kiev	6	0	3	3	1	6	−5	3	1–1	0–0	0–1	—

=== Group D ===
Pos	Team	Pld	W	D	L	GF	GA	GD	Pts	MIN	PAM	ZHA	TBI
1	(Byelorussian Soviet Socialist Republic) Dinamo Minsk	6	5	1	0	14	5	+9	11	—	1–0	4–2	3–0
2	(Tajik Soviet Socialist Republic) Pamir Dushanbe	6	2	1	3	6	7	−1	5	2–2	—	+:-	1–0
3	(Lithuanian Soviet Socialist Republic) Zhalgiris Vilnius	6	2	0	4	9	11	−2	4	1–3	+:-	—	+:-
4	(Georgian Soviet Socialist Republic) Dinamo Tbilisi	6	2	0	4	2	8	−6	4	0–1	1–0	1–0	—

== Knock-out stage ==
Quarter-finals
4 September 1989
(Ukrainian Soviet Socialist Republic) Dnepr Dnepropetrovsk	2
(Russian Soviet Federative Socialist Republic) Torpedo Moscow	0
5 September 1989
(Ukrainian Soviet Socialist Republic) Shakhter Donetsk	2
(Tajik Soviet Socialist Republic) Pamir Dushanbe	1
4 September 1989
(Byelorussian Soviet Socialist Republic) Dinamo Minsk	2
(Ukrainian Soviet Socialist Republic) Chernomorets	1
4 September 1989
(Russian Soviet Federative Socialist Republic) Dinamo Moscow	3
(Russian Soviet Federative Socialist Republic) Rotor Volgograd	1

Semi-finals
6 October 1989
(Ukrainian Soviet Socialist Republic) Dnepr Dnepropetrovsk	1
(Ukrainian Soviet Socialist Republic) Shakhter Donetsk	0
6 October 1989
(Byelorussian Soviet Socialist Republic) Dinamo Minsk	2
(Russian Soviet Federative Socialist Republic) Dinamo Moscow	1

Final
5 November 1989
(Ukrainian Soviet Socialist Republic) Dnepr Dnepropetrovsk	2
(Byelorussian Soviet Socialist Republic) Dinamo Minsk	1

=== Quarterfinals ===
4 September 1989

Dnepr Dnepropetrovsk (Ukrainian Soviet Socialist Republic)	2 – 0	(Russian Soviet Federative Socialist Republic) Torpedo Moscow
Son 18'; Bahmut 70'	Report

Peremoha Stadium, Dneprodzerzhinsk
Attendance: 3,500
Referee: Natan Bartfeld

4 September 1989

Dinamo Minsk (Byelorussian Soviet Socialist Republic)	2 – 1	(Ukrainian Soviet Socialist Republic) Chernomorets Odessa
Gomonov 46'; Antonovich 72'	Report	Nikiforov 75'

Dinamo Stadium, Minsk
Attendance: 4,500
Referee: Gennadiy Yakubovsky

4 September 1989

Dinamo Moscow (Russian Soviet Federative Socialist Republic)	3 – 1	(Russian Soviet Federative Socialist Republic) Rotor Volgograd
Neyman 5'; Karatayev 14'; Yeryomenko 29'	Report	Rykov 70'

Dinamo Stadium, Moscow
Attendance: 1,000
Referee: Anatoliy Malyarov

5 September 1989

Shakhter Donetsk (Ukrainian Soviet Socialist Republic)	2 – 1	(Tajik Soviet Socialist Republic) Pamir Dushanbe
Kobozyev 42', 50'	Report	Nazarov 75'

Shakhtar Central Stadium, Donetsk
Attendance: 1,500
Referee: Viktor Zvyahintsev

=== Semifinals ===
6 October 1989

Dnepr Dnepropetrovsk (Ukrainian Soviet Socialist Republic)	1 – 0	(Ukrainian Soviet Socialist Republic) Shakhter Donetsk
Lyuty 83'	Report

Meteor Stadium, Dnepropetrovsk
Attendance: 3,000
Referee: Yaroslav Hrysyo

6 October 1989

Dinamo Minsk (Byelorussian Soviet Socialist Republic)	2 – 1 (a.e.t.)	(Russian Soviet Federative Socialist Republic) Dinamo Moscow
Antonovich 14'; Myatlitski 103'	Report	Karatayev 24'

Dinamo Stadium, Minsk
Attendance: 1,200
Referee: Sergei Sliva

=== Final ===
5 November 1989

Dnepr Dnepropetrovsk (Ukrainian Soviet Socialist Republic)	2 – 1	(Byelorussian Soviet Socialist Republic) Dinamo Minsk
Kudrytsky 85'; Son 87'	Report	Rassykhin 65'

Meteor Stadium, Dnepropetrovsk
Attendance: 6,000
Referee: Anatoliy Malyarov

(Ukrainian Soviet Socialist Republic); Dnepr:
GK	Serhiy Krakovskyi
DF	Andriy Yudin
DF	Volodymyr Herashchenko
DF	Andriy Sydelnykov
MF	Yuriy Kulish
MF	Mykola Kudrytsky	Yellow card
MF	Volodymyr Bahmut
MF	Oleksiy Cherednyk		(substituted off) 28'
FW	Eduard Son
MF	Valentyn Moskvyn		(substituted off) 69'
DF	Yevhen Shakhov		(substituted off) 46'
Substitutes:
MF	Petro Buts		(substituted on) 28'
FW	Oleksandr Chervonyi		(substituted on) 69'
MF	Volodymyr Lyutyi		(substituted on) 46'
Manager:Yevhen Kucherevsky
Assistant referees:

(Byelorussian Soviet Socialist Republic); Dinamo:
GK	Andrei Satsunkevich
DF	Pavel Radnyonak
MF	Alyaksandar Lukhvich	Yellow card
DF	Sergey Shiroky		(substituted off) 55'
DF	Siarhei Pawlyuchuk
DF	Andrei Zygmantovich
MF	Siarhei Rassykhin
FW	Viktor Sokol		(substituted off) 63'
MF	Siarhei Herasimets
FW	Ihar Hurynovich		(substituted off) 55'
MF	Mikhail Markhel
Substitutions:
DF	Erik Yakhimovich		(substituted on) 55' S
MF	Siarhei Domashevich		(substituted on) 55' H
MF	Alyaksandr Taykow		(substituted on) 63'
Manager:Eduard Malofeyev

== Top scorers ==
5 goals

- Mikhail Markhel (Dinamo Minsk)
- Syarhey Herasimets (Dinamo Minsk)
