= List of UEFA Champions League top scorers =

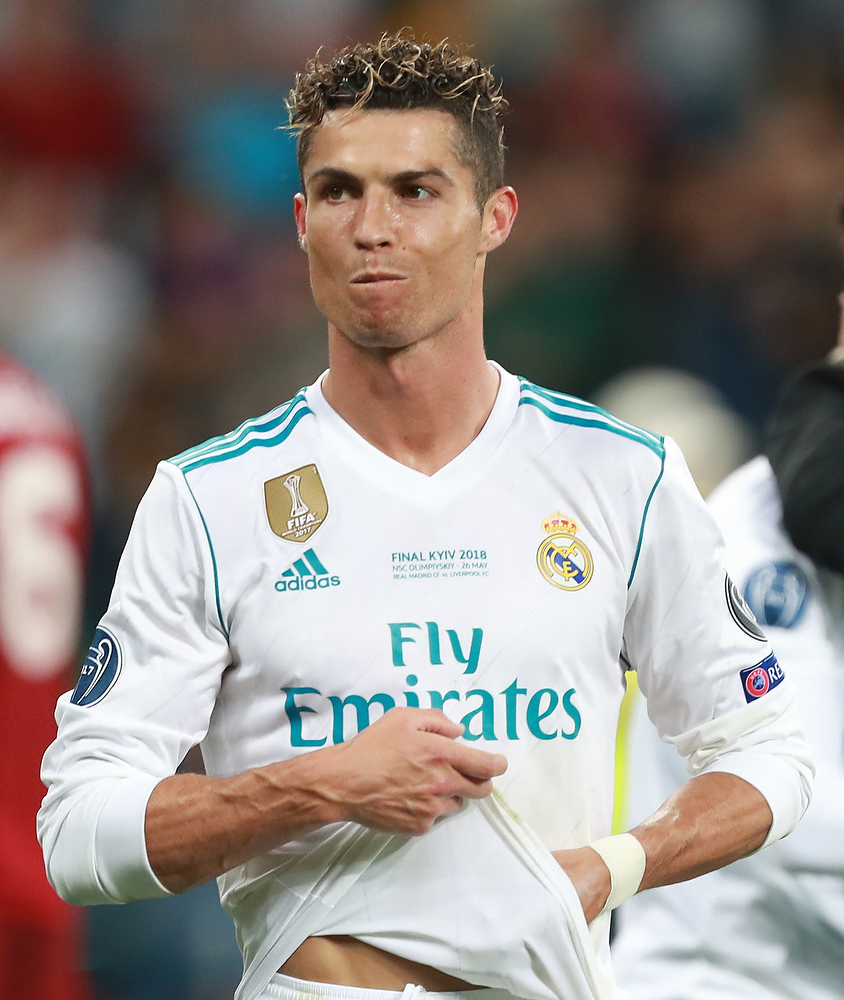
Cristiano Ronaldo is the competition's all-time top scorer with 140 goals

The UEFA Champions League, known until 1992 as the European Champion Clubs' Cup or colloquially as the European Cup, is an annual association football cup competition organised by UEFA since 1955. Originally a straight knockout competition open only to champion clubs, the tournament was expanded during the 1990s to incorporate a round-robin group phase and more teams. The expansion resulted in more games being played, increasing players' goalscoring chances; thus the rankings are weighted in favour of modern players: only five out of the 50 players on the list never competed in the reformed Champions League.

With 140 goals, Cristiano Ronaldo is currently the all-time top scorer in the Champions League, with Lionel Messi and Robert Lewandowski being the only other players to have reached triple figures. Ronaldo has also finished as the top scorer for the most individual seasons in the competition's history, doing so seven times.

The title of highest goalscorer had previously been held by Raúl, who scored his 50th goal in 2005 while at Real Madrid to overtake Alfredo Di Stéfano. He held the record until November 2014, when his eventual tally of 71 was first equalled and then surpassed by Messi. Ronaldo has remained the competition's outright top scorer since September 2015; after a back-and-forth exchange of the record between him and Messi, a hat-trick by the former against Shakhtar Donetsk put Ronaldo ahead with 80 goals, and he would not relinquish the top spot again after this.

== All-time top scorers ==
As of 4 November 2026

A ‡ indicates the player was from the European Cup era.
Players taking part in the 2026–27 UEFA Champions League are highlighted in bold.
The table below does not include goals scored in the qualification stage of the competition.

Rank	Player	Goals	Apps	Ratio	Years	Club(s) (Goals/Apps)
1	(Portugal) Cristiano Ronaldo	140	183	0.77	2003–2022	Manchester United (21/59), Real Madrid (105/101), Juventus (14/23)
2	(Argentina) Lionel Messi	129	163	0.79	2005–2023	Barcelona (120/149), Paris Saint-Germain (9/14)
3	(Poland) Robert Lewandowski	109	144	0.76	2011–2026	Borussia Dortmund (17/28), Bayern Munich (69/78), Barcelona (23/38)
4	(France) Karim Benzema	90	152	0.59	2005–2023	Lyon (12/19), Real Madrid (78/133)
5	(France) **Kylian Mbappé**	74	102	0.73	2016–	Monaco (6/9), Paris Saint-Germain (42/64), **Real Madrid** (26/29)
6	(Spain) Raúl	71	142	0.50	1995–2011	Real Madrid (66/130), Schalke 04 (5/12)
7	(Norway) **Erling Haaland**	62	61	1.02	2019–	Red Bull Salzburg (8/6), Borussia Dortmund (15/13), **Manchester City** (39/42)
8	(England) **Harry Kane**	58	74	0.78	2016–	Tottenham Hotspur (21/32), **Bayern Munich** (37/42)
9	(Germany) Thomas Müller	57	163	0.35	2009–2025	Bayern Munich
10	(Netherlands) Ruud van Nistelrooy	56	73	0.77	1998–2009	PSV Eindhoven (8/11), Manchester United (35/43), Real Madrid (13/19)
11	(Egypt) Mohamed Salah	50	98	0.51	2013–2026	Basel (2/6), Chelsea (0/2), Roma (1/7), Liverpool (47/83)
11	(France) Thierry Henry	50	112	0.45	1997–2012	Monaco (7/9), Arsenal (35/77), Barcelona (8/26)
13	(Argentina) (Spain) Alfredo Di Stéfano ‡	49	58	0.84	1955–1964	Real Madrid
14	(Ukraine) Andriy Shevchenko	48	100	0.48	1994–2012	Dynamo Kyiv (15/26), AC Milan (29/59), Chelsea (4/15)
14	(Sweden) Zlatan Ibrahimović	48	124	0.39	2001–2021	Ajax (6/19), Juventus (3/19), Inter Milan (6/22), Barcelona (4/10), AC Milan (9/20), Paris Saint-Germain (20/33), Manchester United (0/1)
16	(Portugal) Eusébio ‡	46	64	0.72	1961–1974	Benfica
16	(Italy) Filippo Inzaghi	46	81	0.57	1997–2012	Juventus (17/26), AC Milan (29/55)
18	(Ivory Coast) Didier Drogba	44	92	0.48	2003–2015	Marseille (5/6), Chelsea (36/74), Galatasaray (3/12)
18	(France) Antoine Griezmann	44	120	0.37	2014–2026	Real Sociedad (0/6), Atlético Madrid (40/98), Barcelona (4/16)
20	(Brazil) Neymar	43	81	0.53	2013–2022	Barcelona (21/40), Paris Saint-Germain (22/41)
21	(Italy) Alessandro Del Piero	42	89	0.47	1995–2009	Juventus
22	(Argentina) Sergio Agüero	41	79	0.52	2008–2021	Atlético Madrid (5/14), Manchester City (36/64), Barcelona (0/1)
23	(Hungary) Ferenc Puskás ‡	36	41	0.88	1956–1966	Budapest Honvéd (1/2), Real Madrid (35/39)
24	(Uruguay) Edinson Cavani	35	70	0.50	2011–2022	Napoli (5/8), Paris Saint-Germain (30/54), Manchester United (0/8)
25	(West Germany) Gerd Müller ‡	34	35	0.97	1969–1977	Bayern Munich
25	(Brazil) **Vinícius Júnior**	34	86	0.4	2018–	**Real Madrid**
27	(Spain) Fernando Morientes	33	93	0.35	1997–2009	Real Madrid (17/58), Monaco (9/12), Liverpool (1/5), Valencia (6/14), Marseille (0/4)
28	(France) **Ousmane Dembélé**	31	82	0.38	2016–	Borussia Dortmund (2/10), Barcelona (8/30), **Paris Saint-Germain** (21/42)
28	(Netherlands) Arjen Robben	31	110	0.28	2002–2018	PSV Eindhoven (3/10), Chelsea (2/19), Real Madrid (1/11), Bayern Munich (25/70)
30	(Cameroon) Samuel Eto'o	30	78	0.38	1999–2014	Real Madrid (0/3), Mallorca (1/5), Barcelona (16/38), Inter Milan (10/23), Chelsea (3/9)
30	(England) Wayne Rooney	30	85	0.35	2004–2015	Manchester United
30	(Brazil) Kaká	30	86	0.35	2003–2014	AC Milan (25/62), Real Madrid (5/24)
30	(Spain) Paco Gento ‡	30	88	0.34	1955–1969	Real Madrid
34	(France) David Trezeguet	29	58	0.50	1997–2009	Monaco (4/9), Juventus (25/49)
34	(Netherlands) Roy Makaay	29	61	0.48	2000–2007	Deportivo La Coruña (12/29), Bayern Munich (17/32)
34	(Netherlands) Patrick Kluivert	29	71	0.41	1994–2006	Ajax (9/22), Barcelona (20/46), PSV Eindhoven (0/3)
34	(Bosnia and Herzegovina) Edin Džeko	29	75	0.39	2009–2023	VfL Wolfsburg (4/6), Manchester City (3/24), Roma (15/25), Inter Milan (7/20)
34	(Spain) Álvaro Morata	29	89	0.33	2012–2025	Real Madrid (4/15), Juventus (15/35), Chelsea (1/7), Atlético Madrid (8/25), AC Milan (1/7)
39	(France) Jean-Pierre Papin	28	37	0.76	1989–1994	Marseille (19/21), AC Milan (7/13), Bayern Munich (2/3)
39	(Wales) Ryan Giggs	28	145	0.19	1993–2014	Manchester United
41	(Brazil) **Gabriel Jesus**	27	60	0.45	2017–	Manchester City (20/38), Arsenal (6/19), **Barcelona** (1/3)
41	(Senegal) Sadio Mané	27	64	0.42	2017–2023	Liverpool (24/55), Bayern Munich (3/9)
41	(Argentina) **Lautaro Martínez**	27	68	0.4	2019–	**Inter Milan**
41	(Brazil) Rivaldo	27	73	0.37	1997–2007	Barcelona (22/43), AC Milan (2/13), Olympiacos (3/17)
41	(Uruguay) Luis Suárez	27	73	0.37	2010–2022	Ajax (1/5), Barcelona (25/55), Atlético Madrid (1/13)
41	(England) Raheem Sterling	27	88	0.31	2014–2025	Liverpool (0/6), Manchester City (24/67), Chelsea (3/9), Arsenal (0/6)
47	(Germany) Mario Gómez	26	44	0.59	2007–2013	VfB Stuttgart (3/5), Bayern Munich (23/39)
47	(Argentina) **Julián Alvarez**	26	46	0.57	2022–	Manchester City (8/17), **Atlético Madrid** (18/28)
47	(Brazil) **Rodrygo**	26	69	0.38	2019–	**Real Madrid**
50	(Brazil) Mário Jardel	25	46	0.54	1996–2001	Porto (19/32), Galatasaray (6/14)
50	(Netherlands) Robin van Persie	25	59	0.42	2002–2014	Feyenoord (0/2), Arsenal (18/45), Manchester United (7/12)
50	(Argentina) Hernán Crespo	25	65	0.38	1997–2007	Parma (2/6), Lazio (2/11), Inter Milan (11/23), Chelsea (4/15), AC Milan (6/10)

== Top scorers by season ==
The table below does not include goals scored in the qualification stage of the competition.

Season	Player(s)	Club(s)	Goals
1955–56	(Socialist Federal Republic of Yugoslavia) Miloš Milutinović	(Socialist Federal Republic of Yugoslavia) Partizan	8
1956–57	(England) Dennis Viollet	(England) Manchester United	9
1957–58	(Spain) Alfredo Di Stéfano	(Spain) Real Madrid	10
1958–59	(France) Just Fontaine	(France) Reims	10
1959–60	(Hungary) Ferenc Puskás	(Spain) Real Madrid	12
1960–61	(Portugal) José Águas	(Portugal) Benfica	11
1961–62	(West Germany) Heinz Strehl	(West Germany) 1. FC Nürnberg	8
1962–63	(Italy) (Brazil) José Altafini	(Italy) Milan	14
1963–64	(Socialist Federal Republic of Yugoslavia) Vladica Kovačević	(Socialist Federal Republic of Yugoslavia) Partizan	7
1963–64	(Italy) Sandro Mazzola	(Italy) Inter Milan	7
1963–64	(Hungary) Ferenc Puskás	(Spain) Real Madrid	7
1964–65	(Portugal) José Torres	(Portugal) Benfica	11
1965–66	(Hungary) Flórián Albert	(Hungary) Ferencváros	7
1965–66	(Portugal) Eusébio	(Portugal) Benfica	7
1966–67	(East Germany) Jürgen Piepenburg	(East Germany) Vorwärts Berlin	6
1966–67	(Belgium) Paul Van Himst	(Belgium) Anderlecht	6
1967–68	(Portugal) Eusébio	(Portugal) Benfica	6
1968–69	(Scotland) Denis Law	(England) Manchester United	9
1969–70	(England) Mick Jones	(England) Leeds United	8
1970–71	(Greece) Antonis Antoniadis	(Greece) Panathinaikos	10
1971–72	(Netherlands) Johan Cruyff	(Netherlands) Ajax	5
1971–72	(Hungary) Antal Dunai	(Hungary) Újpest	5
1971–72	(Scotland) Lou Macari	(Scotland) Celtic	5
1971–72	(Socialist Federal Republic of Yugoslavia) Silvester Takač	(Belgium) Standard Liège	5
1972–73	(West Germany) Gerd Müller	(West Germany) Bayern Munich	11
1973–74	(West Germany) Gerd Müller	(West Germany) Bayern Munich	8
1974–75	(West Germany) Gerd Müller	(West Germany) Bayern Munich	5
1974–75	(Soviet Union) Eduard Markarov	(Soviet Union) Ararat Yerevan	5
1975–76	(West Germany) Jupp Heynckes	(West Germany) Borussia Mönchengladbach	6
1976–77	(West Germany) Gerd Müller	(West Germany) Bayern Munich	5
1976–77	(Italy) Franco Cucinotta	(Switzerland) Zürich	5
1977–78	(Denmark) Allan Simonsen	(West Germany) Borussia Mönchengladbach	5
1978–79	(Switzerland) Claudio Sulser	(Switzerland) Grasshopper	11
1979–80	(Denmark) Søren Lerby	(Netherlands) Ajax	10
1980–81	(England) Terry McDermott	(England) Liverpool	6
1980–81	(Scotland) Graeme Souness	(England) Liverpool	6
1980–81	(West Germany) Karl-Heinz Rummenigge	(West Germany) Bayern Munich	6
1981–82	(West Germany) Dieter Hoeneß	(West Germany) Bayern Munich	7
1982–83	(Italy) Paolo Rossi	(Italy) Juventus	6
1983–84	(Soviet Union) Viktor Sokol	(Soviet Union) Dinamo Minsk	6
1984–85	(Sweden) Torbjörn Nilsson	(Sweden) IFK Göteborg	7
1984–85	(France) Michel Platini	(Italy) Juventus	7
1985–86	(Sweden) Torbjörn Nilsson	(Sweden) IFK Göteborg	6
1986–87	(Socialist Federal Republic of Yugoslavia) Borislav Cvetković	(Socialist Federal Republic of Yugoslavia) Red Star Belgrade	7
1987–88	(Romania) Gheorghe Hagi	(Romania) Steaua București	4
1987–88	(Czechoslovakia) Petar Novák	(Czechoslovakia) Sparta Prague	4
1987–88	(Netherlands) René van der Gijp	(Switzerland) Neuchâtel Xamax	4
1987–88	(Algeria) Rabah Madjer	(Portugal) Porto	4
1987–88	(Scotland) Ally McCoist	(Scotland) Rangers	4
1987–88	(Spain) Míchel	(Spain) Real Madrid	4
1987–88	(Portugal) Rui Águas	(Portugal) Benfica	4
1988–89	(Netherlands) Marco van Basten	(Italy) Milan	10
1989–90	(Brazil) Romário	(Netherlands) PSV Eindhoven	6
1989–90	(France) Jean-Pierre Papin	(France) Marseille	6
1990–91	(Austria) Peter Pacult	(Austria) Tirol Innsbruck	6
1990–91	(France) Jean-Pierre Papin	(France) Marseille	6
1991–92	(Commonwealth of Independent States) Sergei Yuran	(Portugal) Benfica	7
1991–92	(France) Jean-Pierre Papin	(France) Marseille	7
1992–93	(Brazil) Romário	(Netherlands) PSV Eindhoven	7
1993–94	(Netherlands) Ronald Koeman	(Spain) Barcelona	8
1993–94	(New Zealand) Wynton Rufer	(Germany) Werder Bremen	8
1994–95	(Liberia) George Weah	(France) Paris Saint-Germain	7
1995–96	(Finland) Jari Litmanen	(Netherlands) Ajax	9
1996–97	(Serbia and Montenegro) Milinko Pantić	(Spain) Atlético Madrid	5
1997–98	(Italy) Alessandro Del Piero	(Italy) Juventus	10
1998–99	(Ukraine) Andriy Shevchenko	(Ukraine) Dynamo Kyiv	8
1998–99	(Trinidad and Tobago) Dwight Yorke	(England) Manchester United	8
1999–2000	(Brazil) Mário Jardel	(Portugal) Porto	10
1999–2000	(Brazil) Rivaldo	(Spain) Barcelona	10
1999–2000	(Spain) Raúl	(Spain) Real Madrid	10
2000–01	(Spain) Raúl	(Spain) Real Madrid	7
2001–02	(Netherlands) Ruud van Nistelrooy	(England) Manchester United	10
2002–03	(Netherlands) Ruud van Nistelrooy	(England) Manchester United	12
2003–04	(Spain) Fernando Morientes	(France) Monaco	9
2004–05	(Netherlands) Ruud van Nistelrooy	(England) Manchester United	8
2005–06	(Ukraine) Andriy Shevchenko	(Italy) Milan	9
2006–07	(Brazil) Kaká	(Italy) Milan	10
2007–08	(Portugal) Cristiano Ronaldo	(England) Manchester United	8
2008–09	(Argentina) Lionel Messi	(Spain) Barcelona	9
2009–10	(Argentina) Lionel Messi	(Spain) Barcelona	8
2010–11	(Argentina) Lionel Messi	(Spain) Barcelona	12
2011–12	(Argentina) Lionel Messi	(Spain) Barcelona	14
2012–13	(Portugal) Cristiano Ronaldo	(Spain) Real Madrid	12
2013–14	(Portugal) Cristiano Ronaldo	(Spain) Real Madrid	17
2014–15	(Brazil) Neymar	(Spain) Barcelona	10
2014–15	(Portugal) Cristiano Ronaldo	(Spain) Real Madrid	10
2014–15	(Argentina) Lionel Messi	(Spain) Barcelona	10
2015–16	(Portugal) Cristiano Ronaldo	(Spain) Real Madrid	16
2016–17	(Portugal) Cristiano Ronaldo	(Spain) Real Madrid	12
2017–18	(Portugal) Cristiano Ronaldo	(Spain) Real Madrid	15
2018–19	(Argentina) Lionel Messi	(Spain) Barcelona	12
2019–20	(Poland) Robert Lewandowski	(Germany) Bayern Munich	15
2020–21	(Norway) Erling Haaland	(Germany) Borussia Dortmund	10
2021–22	(France) Karim Benzema	(Spain) Real Madrid	15
2022–23	(Norway) Erling Haaland	(England) Manchester City	12
2023–24	(England) Harry Kane	(Germany) Bayern Munich	8
2023–24	(France) Kylian Mbappé	(France) Paris Saint-Germain	8
2024–25	(Guinea) Serhou Guirassy	(Germany) Borussia Dortmund	13
2024–25	(Brazil) Raphinha	(Spain) Barcelona	13
2025–26	(France) Kylian Mbappé	(Spain) Real Madrid	15

=== By player ===
Player	Titles	Seasons
(Portugal) Cristiano Ronaldo	7	2007–08, 2012–13, 2013–14, 2014–15, 2015–16, 2016–17, 2017–18
(Argentina) Lionel Messi	6	2008–09, 2009–10, 2010–11, 2011–12, 2014–15, 2018–19
(West Germany) Gerd Müller	4	1972–73, 1973–74, 1974–75, 1976–77
(France) Jean-Pierre Papin	3	1989–90, 1990–91, 1991–92
(Netherlands) Ruud van Nistelrooy	3	2001–02, 2002–03, 2004–05
(Hungary) Ferenc Puskás	2	1959–60, 1963–64
(Portugal) Eusébio	2	1965–66, 1967–68
(Sweden) Torbjörn Nilsson	2	1984–85, 1985–86
(Brazil) Romário	2	1989–90, 1992–93
(Spain) Raúl	2	1999–2000, 2000–01
(Ukraine) Andriy Shevchenko	2	1998–99, 2005–06
(Norway) Erling Haaland	2	2020–21, 2022–23
(France) Kylian Mbappé	2	2023–24, 2025–26

=== By club ===
Club	Titles	Seasons
(Spain) Real Madrid	14	1957–58, 1959–60, 1963–64, 1987–88, 1999–2000, 2000–01, 2012–13, 2013–14, 2014–15, 2015–16, 2016–17, 2017–18, 2021–22, 2025–26
(Spain) Barcelona	10	1993–94, 1999–2000, 2008–09, 2009–10, 2010–11, 2011–12, 2014–15 (2 (Note: Two Barcelona players were joint top scorers in this season.)), 2018–19, 2024–25
(Germany) Bayern Munich	8	1972–73, 1973–74, 1974–75, 1976–77, 1980–81, 1981–82, 2019–20, 2023–24
(England) Manchester United	7	1956–57, 1968–69, 1998–99, 2001–02, 2002–03, 2004–05, 2007–08
(Portugal) Benfica	6	1960–61, 1964–65, 1965–66, 1967–68, 1987–88, 1991–92
(Italy) Milan	4	1962–63, 1988–89, 2005–06, 2006–07
(France) Marseille	3	1989–90, 1990–91, 1991–92
(Netherlands) Ajax	3	1971–72, 1979–80, 1995–96
(Italy) Juventus	3	1982–83, 1984–85, 1997–98
(Serbia) Partizan	2	1955–56, 1963–64
(Germany) Borussia Mönchengladbach	2	1975–76, 1977–78
(England) Liverpool	2	1980–81 (2 (Note: Two Liverpool players were joint top scorers in this season.))
(Sweden) IFK Göteborg	2	1984–85, 1985–86
(Netherlands) PSV Eindhoven	2	1989–90, 1992–93
(Portugal) Porto	2	1987–88, 1999–2000
(France) Paris Saint-Germain	2	1994–95, 2023–24
(Germany) Borussia Dortmund	2	2020–21, 2024–25
(France) Reims	1	1958–59
(Germany) 1. FC Nürnberg	1	1961–62
(Italy) Inter Milan	1	1963–64
(Hungary) Ferencváros	1	1965–66
(Belgium) Anderlecht	1	1966–67
(East Germany) Vorwärts Berlin	1	1966–67
(England) Leeds United	1	1969–70
(Greece) Panathinaikos	1	1970–71
(Scotland) Celtic	1	1971–72
(Belgium) Standard Liège	1	1971–72
(Hungary) Újpest	1	1971–72
(Armenia) Ararat Yerevan	1	1974–75
(Switzerland) Zürich	1	1976–77
(Switzerland) Grasshopper	1	1978–79
(Belarus) Dinamo Minsk	1	1983–84
(Serbia) Red Star Belgrade	1	1986–87
(Switzerland) Neuchâtel Xamax	1	1987–88
(Czech Republic) Sparta Prague	1	1987–88
(Romania) Steaua București	1	1987–88
(Scotland) Rangers	1	1987–88
(Austria) Tirol Innsbruck	1	1990–91
(Germany) Werder Bremen	1	1993–94
(Spain) Atlético Madrid	1	1996–97
(Ukraine) Dynamo Kyiv	1	1998–99
(France) Monaco	1	2003–04
(England) Manchester City	1	2022–23

=== By country ===
Country	Titles	Seasons
Portugal	12	1960–61, 1964–65, 1965–66, 1967–68, 1987–88, 2007–08, 2012–13, 2013–14, 2014–15, 2015–16, 2016–17, 2017–18
West Germany	8	1961–62, 1972–73, 1973–74, 1974–75, 1975–76, 1976–77, 1980–81, 1981–82
Argentina	8	1957–58, 1961–62, 2008–09, 2009–10, 2010–11, 2011–12, 2014–15, 2018–19
France	8	1958–59, 1984–85, 1989–90, 1990–91, 1991–92, 2021–22, 2023–24, 2025–26
Netherlands	7	1971–72, 1987–88, 1988–89, 1993–94, 2001–02, 2002–03, 2004–05
Brazil	7	1989–90, 1992–93, 1999–2000 (2 (Note: Two Brazilian players were joint top scorers in this season.)), 2006–07, 2014–15, 2024–25
Yugoslavia	5	1955–56, 1963–64, 1971–72, 1986–87, 1996–97
Italy	5	1962–63, 1963–64, 1976–77, 1982–83, 1997–98
Hungary	4	1959–60, 1963–64, 1965–66, 1971–72
Scotland	4	1968–69, 1971–72, 1980–81, 1987–88
Spain	4	1987–88, 1999–2000, 2000–01, 2003–04
England	4	1956–57, 1969–70, 1980–81, 2023–24
Soviet Union / CIS	3	1974–75, 1983–84, 1991–92
Denmark	2	1977–78, 1979–80
Sweden	2	1984–85, 1985–86
Ukraine	2	1998–99, 2005–06
Norway	2	2020–21, 2022–23
Belgium	1	1966–67
Greece	1	1970–71
Switzerland	1	1978–79
Algeria	1	1987–88
Czechoslovakia	1	1987–88
Romania	1	1987–88
Austria	1	1990–91
New Zealand	1	1993–94
Liberia	1	1994–95
Finland	1	1995–96
Trinidad and Tobago	1	1998–99
Poland	1	2019–20
Guinea	1	2024–25

== See also ==
- List of footballers with 100 or more UEFA Champions League appearances
- List of UEFA Cup and Europa League top scorers
- List of UEFA Cup Winners' Cup top scorers
- List of UEFA Champions League hat-tricks
