= 1989–90 European Cup =

European football tournament

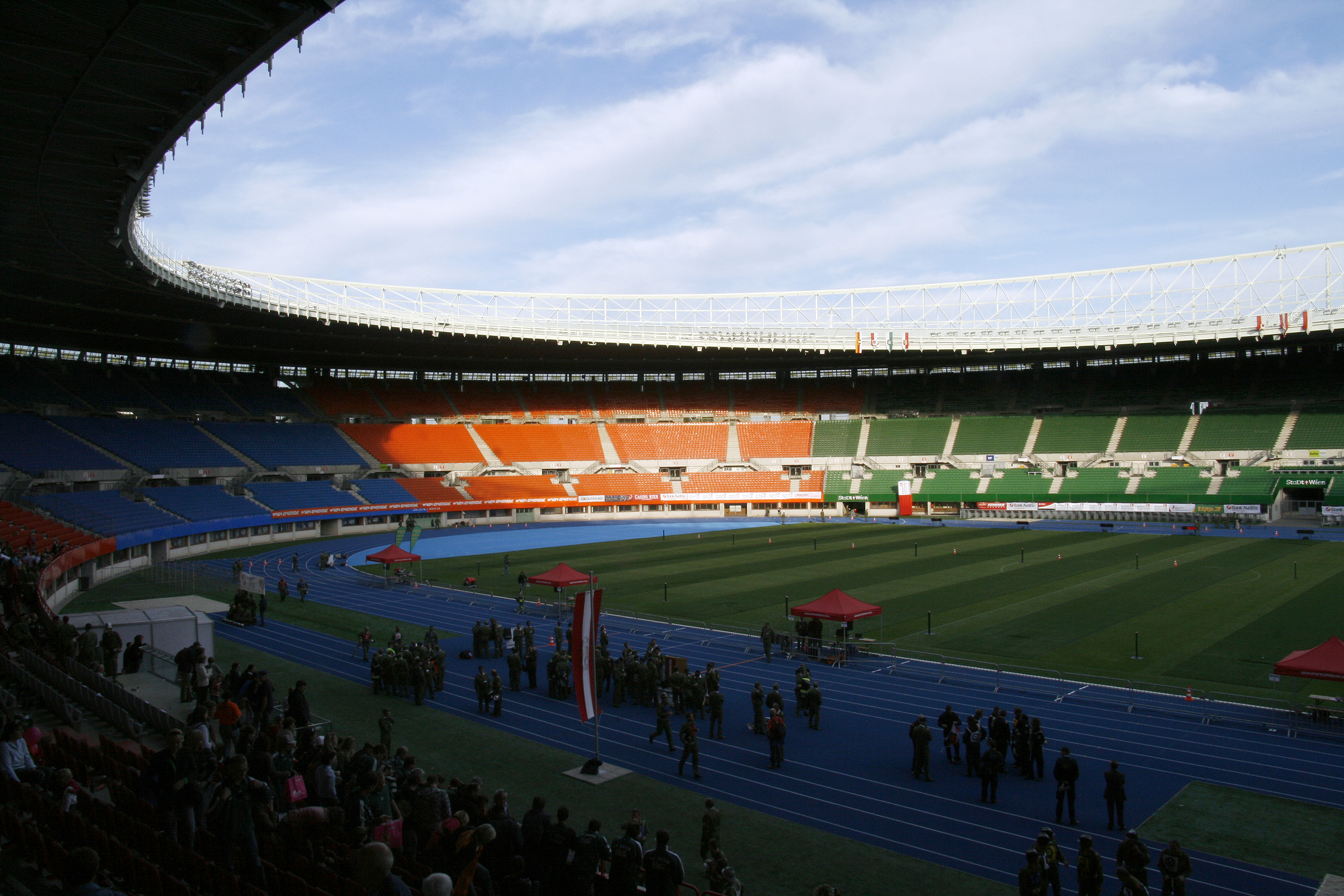
- The Praterstadion in Vienna hosted the final.

Tournament details
- Dates: 13 September 1989 – 23 May 1990
- Teams: 32

Final positions
- Champions: (Italy) AC Milan (4th title)
- Runners-up: (Portugal) Benfica

Tournament statistics
- Matches played: 61
- Goals scored: 169 (2.77 per match)
- Attendance: 1,639,836 (26,883 per match)
- Top scorer(s): Jean-Pierre Papin (Marseille); Romário (PSV Eindhoven); 6 goals each

The 1989–90 European Cup was the 35th edition of Europe's premier club football tournament, the European Cup. The final was played at the Praterstadion in Vienna on 23 May 1990. The final was contested by Italian defending champions Milan and Portuguese twice former winners Benfica. Milan successfully defended their title with a 1–0 victory, securing their fourth European Cup trophy. Milan remained the last team to successfully defend their trophy until Real Madrid did it again in 2017. Arsenal were denied a place in the competition, as this was the last year of a ban from European competitions for English clubs following the Heysel Stadium disaster of 1985.

== Teams ==
(Albania) 17 Nëntori (1st)	(Austria) Swarovski Tirol (1st)	(Belgium) Mechelen (1st)	(Bulgaria) CSKA Sofia (1st)
(Cyprus) Omonia (1st)	(Czechoslovakia) Sparta Prague (1st)	(Denmark) Brøndby (1st)	(Finland) HJK (1st)
(France) Marseille (1st)	(East Germany) Dynamo Dresden (1st)	(West Germany) Bayern Münich (1st)	(Greece) AEK Athens (1st)
(Hungary) Budapesti Honvéd (1st)	(Iceland) Fram (1st)	(Republic of Ireland) Derry City (1st)	(Italy) Inter Milan (1st)
(Italy) Milan (TH)	Spora Luxembourg (1st)	(Malta) Sliema Wanderers (1st)	(Netherlands) PSV Eindhoven (1st)
(Northern Ireland) Linfield (1st)	(Norway) Rosenborg (1st)	(Poland) Ruch Chorzów (1st)	(Portugal) Benfica (1st)
(Romania) Steaua București (1st)	(Scotland) Rangers (1st)	(Spain) Real Madrid (1st)	(Sweden) Malmö (1st)
(Switzerland) Luzern (1st)	(Turkey) Fenerbahçe (1st)	(Soviet Union) Dnipro Dnipropetrovsk (1st)	(Socialist Federal Republic of Yugoslavia) Vojvodina (1st)

== Bracket ==
First round
(Sweden) Malmö	1	1	2
(Italy) Inter Milan	0	1	1
(Norway) Rosenborg	0	0	0
(Belgium) Mechelen	0	5	5
(Italy) Milan	4	1	5
(Finland) HJK Helsinki	0	0	0
Spora Luxembourg	0	0	0
(Spain) Real Madrid	3	6	9
(Scotland) Rangers	1	0	1
(West Germany) Bayern Münich	3	0	3
(Albania) 17 Nëntori	0	5	5
(Malta) Sliema Wanderers	1	0	1
(Netherlands) PSV Eindhoven	3	2	5
(Switzerland) Luzern	0	0	0
(Romania) Steaua București	4	1	5
(Iceland) Fram	0	0	0
(Portugal) Benfica	2	4	6
(Republic of Ireland) Derry City	1	0	1
(Hungary) Budapest Honvéd (a)	1	1	2
(Socialist Federal Republic of Yugoslavia) Vojvodina	0	2	2
(Soviet Union) Dnipro	2	1	3
(Northern Ireland) Linfield	1	0	1
(Austria) Swarovski Tirol	6	3	9
(Cyprus) Omonia	0	2	2
(France) Marseille	3	1	4
(Denmark) Brøndby	0	1	1
(Greece) AEK Athens	0	5	5
(East Germany) Dynamo Dresden	1	3	4
(Bulgaria) CSKA Sofia	1	5	6
(Poland) Ruch Chorzów	1	1	2
(Czechoslovakia) Sparta Prague	3	2	5
(Turkey) Fenerbahçe	1	1	2

Second round
(Sweden) Malmö	0	1	1
(Belgium) Mechelen	0	4	4
(Italy) Milan	2	0	2
(Spain) Real Madrid	0	1	1
(West Germany) Bayern Münich	3	3	6
(Albania) 17 Nëntori	1	0	1
(Netherlands) PSV Eindhoven	0	5	5
(Romania) Steaua București	1	1	2
(Portugal) Benfica	2	7	9
(Hungary) Budapest Honvéd	0	0	0
(Soviet Union) Dnipro	2	2	4
(Austria) Swarovski Tirol	0	2	2
(France) Marseille	2	1	3
(Greece) AEK Athens	0	1	1
(Bulgaria) CSKA Sofia	2	3	5
(Czechoslovakia) Sparta Prague	2	0	2

Quarter-finals
(Belgium) Mechelen	0	0	0
(Italy) Milan	0	2	2
(West Germany) Bayern Münich	2	1	3
(Netherlands) PSV Eindhoven	1	0	1
(Portugal) Benfica	1	3	4
(Soviet Union) Dnipro	0	0	0
(France) Marseille	1	3	4
(Bulgaria) CSKA Sofia	0	1	1

Semi-finals
(Italy) Milan (a)	1	1	2
(West Germany) Bayern Münich	0	2	2
(Portugal) Benfica (a)	1	1	2
(France) Marseille	2	0	2

Final
(Italy) Milan	1
(Portugal) Benfica	0

== First round ==
Team 1	Agg.	Team 2	1st leg	2nd leg
Malmö (Sweden)	2–1	(Italy) Inter Milan	1–0	1–1
Rosenborg (Norway)	0–5	(Belgium) Mechelen	0–0	0–5
Milan (Italy)	5–0	(Finland) HJK	4–0	1–0
Spora Luxembourg	0–9	(Spain) Real Madrid	0–3	0–6
Rangers (Scotland)	1–3	(West Germany) Bayern Münich	1–3	0–0
Sliema Wanderers (Malta)	1–5	(Albania) 17 Nëntori	1–0	0–5
Steaua București (Romania)	5–0	(Iceland) Fram	4–0	1–0
PSV Eindhoven (Netherlands)	5–0	(Switzerland) Luzern	3–0	2–0
Sparta Prague (Czechoslovakia)	5–2	(Turkey) Fenerbahçe	3–1	2–1
Ruch Chorzów (Poland)	2–6	(Bulgaria) CSKA Sofia	1–1	1–5
Marseille (France)	4–1	(Denmark) Brøndby	3–0	1–1
Dynamo Dresden (East Germany)	4–5	(Greece) AEK Athens	1–0	3–5
Budapesti Honvéd (Hungary)	2–2 (a)	(Socialist Federal Republic of Yugoslavia) Vojvodina	1–0	1–2
Derry City (Republic of Ireland)	1–6	(Portugal) Benfica	1–2	0–4
Linfield (Northern Ireland)	1–3	(Soviet Union) Dnipro Dnipropetrovsk	1–2	0–1
Swarovski Tirol (Austria)	9–2	(Cyprus) Omonia	6–0	3–2

=== First leg ===
13 September 1989

Malmö (Sweden)	1–0	(Italy) Inter Milan
Lindman 74'	Report

Malmö Stadion, Malmö
Attendance: 20,033
Referee: Claude Bouillet (France)

13 September 1989

Rosenborg (Norway)	0–0	(Belgium) Mechelen
	Report

Lerkendal Stadion, Trondheim
Attendance: 10,352
Referee: Alan Snoddy (Northern Ireland)

13 September 1989

Milan (Italy)	4–0	(Finland) HJK
Stroppa 5'; Massaro 38', 70'; Evani 81'	Report

San Siro, Milan
Attendance: 41,205
Referee: Stefanos Hatzistefanou (Cyprus)

13 September 1989

Spora Luxembourg	0–3	(Spain) Real Madrid
	Report	Butragueño 26'; Míchel 67' (pen.), 69'

Ludwigsparkstadion, Saarbrücken
Attendance: 5,900
Referee: Wim Egbertzen (Netherlands)

13 September 1989

Rangers (Scotland)	1–3	(West Germany) Bayern Münich
Walters 26' (pen.)	Report	Kögl 28'; Thon 46' (pen.); Augenthaler 66'

Ibrox Park, Glasgow
Attendance: 40,135
Referee: Pietro D'Elia (Italy)

13 September 1989

Sliema Wanderers (Malta)	1–0	(Albania) 17 Nëntori
Walker 59'	Report

Ta' Qali, Attard
Attendance: 1,268
Referee: Meletis Voutsaras (Greece)

13 September 1989

Steaua București (Romania)	4–0	(Iceland) Fram
Petrescu 30'; Hagi 41' (pen.); Balint 73'; Muzsnay 86'	Report

Stadionul Steaua, Bucharest
Attendance: 8,236
Referee: Besnik Kaimi (Albania)

13 September 1989

PSV Eindhoven (Netherlands)	3–0	(Switzerland) Luzern
Kieft 4'; Ellerman 54'; Romário 81'	Report

Philips Stadion, Eindhoven
Attendance: 16,100
Referee: John Spillane (Republic of Ireland)

13 September 1989

Sparta Prague (Czechoslovakia)	3–1	(Turkey) Fenerbahçe
Čabala 57'; Bílek 74' (pen.), 78'	Report	Hakan 19'

Stadion Letná, Prague
Attendance: 15,944
Referee: Keith Cooper (Wales)

Due to fan incidents at the match, Sparta Prague were punished with a stadium ban, being ordered to play their next European home match at least 300 kilometres (190 mi) from Prague.

13 September 1989

Ruch Chorzów (Poland)	1–1	(Bulgaria) CSKA Sofia
Szewczyk 43'	Report	Penev 18'

Stadion Śląski, Chorzów
Attendance: 6,390
Referee: Ștefan Petrescu (Romania)

13 September 1989

Marseille (France)	3–0	(Denmark) Brøndby
Sauzée 62'; Papin 67'; Vercruysse 81'	Report

Stade Vélodrome, Marseille
Attendance: 18,686
Referee: Rosario Lo Bello (Italy)

13 September 1989

Dynamo Dresden (East Germany)	1–0	(Greece) AEK Athens
Lieberam 75'	Report

Dynamo-Stadion, Dresden
Attendance: 33,014
Referee: Carlos Silva Valente (Portugal)

13 September 1989

Budapesti Honvéd (Hungary)	1–0	(Socialist Federal Republic of Yugoslavia) Vojvodina
Fodor 55'	Report

Bozsik József Stadion, Budapest
Attendance: 4,046
Referee: Piotr Werner (Poland)

13 September 1989

Derry City (Republic of Ireland)	1–2	(Portugal) Benfica
Carlyle 73'	Report	Thern 59'; Ricardo Gomes 64'

Brandywell Stadium, Derry
Attendance: 10,317
Referee: Guy Goethals (Belgium)

13 September 1989

Linfield (Northern Ireland)	1–2	(Soviet Union) Dnipro Dnipropetrovsk
Mooney 88' (pen.)	Report	Kudrytsky 9', 53'

Racecourse Ground, Wrexham (Note: Linfield played their home match at Racecourse Ground, Wrexham, Wales, as their regular stadium Windsor Park, Belfast, was disqualified because of fan riots.)
Attendance: 1,235
Referee: Frans Houben (Netherlands)

13 September 1989

Swarovski Tirol (Austria)	6–0	(Cyprus) Omonia
Peischl 8'; Müller 11' (pen.); Westerthaler 58'; Pacult 72', 75'; Hörtnagl 80'	Report

Tivoli-Stadion, Innsbruck
Attendance: 12,500
Referee: Rudolf Liska (Czechoslovakia)

=== Second leg ===
27 September 1989

Inter Milan (Italy)	1–1	(Sweden) Malmö
Serena 70'	Report	Engqvist 80'

San Siro, Milan
Attendance: 51,814
Referee: Siegfried Kirschen (East Germany)

Malmö FF won 2–1 on aggregate.

27 September 1989

Mechelen (Belgium)	5–0	(Norway) Rosenborg
Bosman 15', 55'; Ohana 56', 78'; Severeyns 87'	Report

Achter de Kazerne, Mechelen
Attendance: 6,000
Referee: Roger Philippi (Luxembourg)

Mechelen won 5–0 on aggregate.

27 September 1989

HJK (Finland)	0–1	(Italy) Milan
	Report	Borgonovo 29'

Olympiastadion, Helsinki
Attendance: 17,864
Referee: Valeri Butenko (Soviet Union)

Milan won 5–0 on aggregate.

27 September 1989

Real Madrid (Spain)	6–0	Spora Luxembourg
Sánchez 31'; Esteban 35'; Kremer 45' (o.g.); Losada 53'; J. Llorente 59'; Tendillo 87'	Report

Santiago Bernabéu, Madrid
Attendance: 16,000
Referee: Edgar Azzopardi (Malta)

Real Madrid won 9–0 on aggregate.

27 September 1989

Bayern Münich (West Germany)	0–0	(Scotland) Rangers
	Report

Olympiastadion, Munich
Attendance: 43,000
Referee: Erik Fredriksson (Sweden)

Bayern Münich won 3–1 on aggregate.

27 September 1989

17 Nëntori (Albania)	5–0	(Malta) Sliema Wanderers
Kola 29', 34' (pen.); Bardhi 39'; Hodja 51'; Riza 56'	Report

Qemal Stafa Stadium, Tirana
Attendance: 10,000
Referee: Coşkun Kutay (Turkey)

17 Nëntori won 5–1 on aggregate.

27 September 1989

Fram (Iceland)	0–1	(Romania) Steaua București
	Report	Negrău 59'

Laugardalsvöllur, Reykjavík
Attendance: 589
Referee: Rune Pedersen (Norway)

Steaua București won 5–0 on aggregate.

27 September 1989

Luzern (Switzerland)	0–2	(Netherlands) PSV Eindhoven
	Report	Romário 25', 32'

Stadion Allmend, Lucerne
Attendance: 11,700
Referee: Joël Quiniou (France)

PSV Eindhoven won 5–0 on aggregate.

27 September 1989

Fenerbahçe (Turkey)	1–2	(Czechoslovakia) Sparta Prague
Oğuz 83'	Report	Hašek 41'; Novák 90'

Fenerbahçe Stadium, Istanbul
Attendance: 34,789
Referee: Tullio Lanese (Italy)

Sparta Prague won 5–2 on aggregate.

27 September 1989

CSKA Sofia (Bulgaria)	5–1	(Poland) Ruch Chorzów
Georgiev 20', 49'; Bakalov 25'; Penev 80'; Vitanov 90'	Report	Warzycha 87'

Narodna Armia, Sofia
Attendance: 15,000
Referee: Jiří Stiegler (Czechoslovakia)

CSKA Sofia won 6–2 on aggregate.

27 September 1989

Brøndby (Denmark)	1–1	(France) Marseille
Olsen 54'	Report	Papin 64'

Brøndby Stadion, Brøndbyvester
Attendance: 10,300
Referee: Rodger Gifford (Wales)

Marseille won 4–1 on aggregate.

27 September 1989

AEK Athens (Greece)	5–3	(East Germany) Dynamo Dresden
Manolas 27'; Okoński 33' (pen.); Savvidis 37', 60'; Savevski 82'	Report	Gütschow 10'; Lieberam 63'; Minge 85'

AEK Stadium, Athens
Attendance: 28,151
Referee: Emilio Soriano Aladrén (Spain)

AEK Athens won 5–4 on aggregate.

27 September 1989

Vojvodina (Socialist Federal Republic of Yugoslavia)	2–1	(Hungary) Budapesti Honvéd
Mihajlović 26'; Tanjga 47'	Report	Gaćeša 76' (o.g.)

Gradski Stadion, Novi Sad
Attendance: 2,637
Referee: Alexey Spirin (Soviet Union)

2–2 on aggregate; Budapesti Honvéd won on away goals.

27 September 1989

Benfica (Portugal)	4–0	(Republic of Ireland) Derry City
Magnusson 32'; Vata 61'; Ricardo Gomes 69'; Aldair 80'	Report

Estádio do Sport Lisboa e Benfica, Lisbon
Attendance: 50,000
Referee: Ildefonso Urizar Azpitarte (Spain)

Benfica won 6–1 on aggregate.

27 September 1989

Dnipro Dnipropetrovsk (Soviet Union)	1–0	(Northern Ireland) Linfield
Son 7'	Report

Meteor Stadium, Dnipropetrovsk
Attendance: 29,500
Referee: Esa Palsi (Finland)

Dnipro Dnipropetrovsk won 3–1 on aggregate.

27 September 1989

Omonia (Cyprus)	2–3	(Austria) Swarovski Tirol
Xiourouppas 10'; Giatrou 60'	Report	Baur 48'; Westerthaler 85'; Pacult 90'

Makario Stadium, Nicosia
Attendance: 5,841
Referee: Dušan Colić (Yugoslavia)

Swarovski Tirol won 9–2 on aggregate.

== Second round ==
Team 1	Agg.	Team 2	1st leg	2nd leg
Malmö (Sweden)	1–4	(Belgium) Mechelen	0–0	1–4
Milan (Italy)	2–1	(Spain) Real Madrid	2–0	0–1
Bayern Münich (West Germany)	6–1	(Albania) 17 Nëntori	3–1	3–0
Steaua București (Romania)	2–5	(Netherlands) PSV Eindhoven	1–0	1–5
Sparta Prague (Czechoslovakia)	2–5	(Bulgaria) CSKA Sofia	2–2	0–3
Marseille (France)	3–1	(Greece) AEK Athens	2–0	1–1
Budapesti Honvéd (Hungary)	0–9	(Portugal) Benfica	0–2	0–7
Dnipro Dnipropetrovsk (Soviet Union)	4–2	(Austria) Swarovski Tirol	2–0	2–2

=== First leg ===
18 October 1989

Malmö (Sweden)	0–0	(Belgium) Mechelen
	Report

Malmö Stadion, Malmö
Attendance: 19,015
Referee: Joe Worrall (England)

18 October 1989

Milan (Italy)	2–0	(Spain) Real Madrid
Rijkaard 9'; Van Basten 14' (pen.)	Report

San Siro, Milan
Attendance: 68,359
Referee: Aron Schmidhuber (West Germany)

18 October 1989

Bayern Münich (West Germany)	3–1	(Albania) 17 Nëntori
Kögl 16' (pen.); Mihajlović 24', 64'	Report	Minga 30'

Olympiastadion, Munich
Attendance: 11,500
Referee: Roger Philippi (Luxembourg)

18 October 1989

Steaua București (Romania)	1–0	(Netherlands) PSV Eindhoven
Lăcătuș 16'	Report

Stadionul Steaua, Bucharest
Attendance: 22,412
Referee: Bo Karlsson (Sweden)

18 October 1989

Sparta Prague (Czechoslovakia)	2–2	(Bulgaria) CSKA Sofia
Bílek 75' (pen.); Skuhravý 84'	Report	Stoichkov 13'; Kostadinov 57'

Štadión Spartaka, Trnava (Note: Match was played in Trnava due to a stadium ban of Sparta's home ground as a result of fan incidents at their European Cup first round home match versus Fenerbahçe and UEFA's subsequent punishment to play the next home match at least 300 kilometres (190 mi) away from Prague.)
Attendance: 7,765
Referee: Aleksandr Kokriakov (Soviet Union)

18 October 1989

Marseille (France)	2–0	(Greece) AEK Athens
Papin 55'; Manolas 80' (o.g.)	Report

Stade Vélodrome, Marseille
Attendance: 24,263
Referee: Georges Sandoz (Switzerland)

18 October 1989

Budapesti Honvéd (Hungary)	0–2	(Portugal) Benfica
	Report	Pacheco 32' (pen.); Valdo 86'

Bozsik József Stadion, Budapest
Attendance: 4,621
Referee: Keith Cooper (Wales)

18 October 1989

Dnipro Dnipropetrovsk (Soviet Union)	2–0	(Austria) Swarovski Tirol
Yudin 37'; Son 68'	Report

Meteor Stadium, Dnipropetrovsk
Attendance: 27,500
Referee: Peter Mikkelsen (Denmark)

=== Second leg ===
1 November 1989

Mechelen (Belgium)	4–1	(Sweden) Malmö
De Wilde 18', 20'; Bosman 46'; P. Versavel 56'	Report	Lindman 59'

Achter de Kazerne, Mechelen
Attendance: 6,815
Referee: José Rosa dos Santos (Portugal)

Mechelen won 4–1 on aggregate.

1 November 1989

Real Madrid (Spain)	1–0	(Italy) Milan
Butragueño 48'	Report

Santiago Bernabéu, Madrid
Attendance: 82,783
Referee: Michel Vautrot (France)

Milan won 2–1 on aggregate.

1 November 1989

17 Nëntori (Albania)	0–3	(West Germany) Bayern Münich
	Report	Strunz 45'; Grahammer 47'; Dorfner 89'

Qemal Stafa Stadium, Tirana
Attendance: 18,000
Referee: Dušan Krchňák (Czechoslovakia)

Bayern Münich won 6–1 on aggregate.

1 November 1989

PSV Eindhoven (Netherlands)	5–1	(Romania) Steaua București
Ellerman 21', 64'; Romário 47', 49', 86'	Report	Lăcătuș 17'

Philips Stadion, Eindhoven
Attendance: 28,000
Referee: Siegfried Kirschen (East Germany)

PSV Eindhoven won 5–2 on aggregate.

1 November 1989

CSKA Sofia (Bulgaria)	3–0	(Czechoslovakia) Sparta Prague
Stoichkov 45' (pen.), 89'; Kostadinov 83'	Report

Narodna Armia, Sofia
Attendance: 21,330
Referee: Bernd Heynemann (East Germany)

CSKA Sofia won 5–2 on aggregate.

1 November 1989

AEK Athens (Greece)	1–1	(France) Marseille
Savevski 79' (pen.)	Report	Papin 84'

AEK Stadium, Athens
Attendance: 33,260
Referee: Helmut Kohl (Austria)

Marseille won 3–1 on aggregate.

1 November 1989

Benfica (Portugal)	7–0	(Hungary) Budapesti Honvéd
César Brito 15', 42'; Abel Campos 36'; Vata 62', 64'; Magnusson 86', 89'	Report

Estádio do Sport Lisboa e Benfica, Lisbon
Attendance: 40,000
Referee: Allan Gunn (England)

Benfica won 9–0 on aggregate.

1 November 1989

Swarovski Tirol (Austria)	2–2	(Soviet Union) Dnipro Dnipropetrovsk
Westerthaler 30'; Pacult 77'	Report	Son 5'; Lyutyi 80'

Tivoli-Stadion, Innsbruck
Attendance: 14,500
Referee: Pietro D'Elia (Italy)

Dnipro Dnipropetrovsk won 4–2 on aggregate.

== Quarter-finals ==
Team 1	Agg.	Team 2	1st leg	2nd leg
Mechelen (Belgium)	0–2	(Italy) Milan	0–0	0–2 (aet)
Bayern Münich (West Germany)	3–1	(Netherlands) PSV Eindhoven	2–1	1–0
CSKA Sofia (Bulgaria)	1–4	(France) Marseille	0–1	1–3
Benfica (Portugal)	4–0	(Soviet Union) Dnipro Dnipropetrovsk	1–0	3–0

=== First leg ===
7 March 1990

Mechelen (Belgium)	0–0	(Italy) Milan
	Report

Stade du Heysel, Brussels
Attendance: 32,081
Referee: George Courtney (England)

7 March 1990

Bayern Münich (West Germany)	2–1	(Netherlands) PSV Eindhoven
Wohlfarth 75'; Grahammer 85'	Report	Povlsen 77'

Olympiastadion, Munich
Attendance: 32,000
Referee: Marcel Van Langenhove (Belgium)

7 March 1990

CSKA Sofia (Bulgaria)	0–1	(France) Marseille
	Report	Thys 85'

Nationalen Stadion Vasil Levski, Sofia
Attendance: 56,000
Referee: Aron Schmidhuber (West Germany)

7 March 1990

Benfica (Portugal)	1–0	(Soviet Union) Dnipro Dnipropetrovsk
Magnusson 9' (pen.)	Report

Estádio do Sport Lisboa e Benfica, Lisbon
Attendance: 60,000
Referee: Joël Quiniou (France)

=== Second leg ===
21 March 1990

Milan (Italy)	2–0 (a.e.t.)	(Belgium) Mechelen
Van Basten 106'; Simone 117'	Report

San Siro, Milan
Attendance: 62,801
Referee: Kurt Röthlisberger (Switzerland)

Milan won 2–0 on aggregate.

21 March 1990

PSV Eindhoven (Netherlands)	0–1	(West Germany) Bayern Münich
	Report	Gerets 90' (o.g.)

Philips Stadion, Eindhoven
Attendance: 27,500
Referee: Helmut Kohl (Austria)

Bayern Münich won 3–1 on aggregate.

21 March 1990

Marseille (France)	3–1	(Bulgaria) CSKA Sofia
Waddle 25'; Papin 28'; Sauzée 72'	Report	Urukov 84'

Stade Vélodrome, Marseille
Attendance: 34,651
Referee: Lajos Németh (Hungary)

Marseille won 4–1 on aggregate.

21 March 1990

Dnipro Dnipropetrovsk (Soviet Union)	0–3	(Portugal) Benfica
	Report	Lima 55', 60'; Ricardo Gomes 86'

Meteor Stadium, Dnipropetrovsk
Attendance: 26,000
Referee: John Blankenstein (Netherlands)

Benfica won 4–0 on aggregate.

== Semi-finals ==
Team 1	Agg.	Team 2	1st leg	2nd leg
Milan (Italy)	2–2 (a)	(West Germany) Bayern Münich	1–0	1–2 (a.e.t.)
Marseille (France)	2–2 (a)	(Portugal) Benfica	2–1	0–1

=== First leg ===
4 April 1990

Milan (Italy)	1–0	(West Germany) Bayern Münich
Van Basten 77' (pen.)	Report

San Siro, Milan
Attendance: 62,717
Referee: Bo Karlsson (Sweden)

4 April 1990

Marseille (France)	2–1	(Portugal) Benfica
Sauzée 14'; Papin 44'	Report	Lima 11'

Stade Vélodrome, Marseille
Attendance: 36,859
Referee: George Courtney (England)

=== Second leg ===
18 April 1990

Bayern Münich (West Germany)	2–1 (a.e.t.)	(Italy) Milan
Strunz 60'; McInally 108'	Report	Borgonovo 100'

Olympiastadion, Munich
Attendance: 63,000
Referee: Emilio Soriano Aladrén (Spain)

2–2 on aggregate; Milan won on away goals.

18 April 1990

Benfica (Portugal)	1–0	(France) Marseille
Vata 83'	Report

Estádio do Sport Lisboa e Benfica, Lisbon
Attendance: 80,000
Referee: Marcel Van Langenhove (Belgium)

2–2 on aggregate; Benfica won on away goals.

== Final ==
23 May 1990

Milan (Italy)	1–0	(Portugal) Benfica
Rijkaard 68'	Report

Praterstadion, Vienna
Attendance: 57,558
Referee: Helmut Kohl (Austria)

== Top scorers ==
Rank	Name	Team	Goals
1	(France) Jean-Pierre Papin	(France) Marseille	6
1	(Brazil) Romário	(Netherlands) PSV Eindhoven	6
3	(Sweden) Mats Magnusson	(Portugal) Benfica	4
3	(Austria) Peter Pacult	(Austria) Swarovski Tirol	4
3	(Angola) Vata	(Portugal) Benfica	4
6	(Czechoslovakia) Michal Bílek	(Czechoslovakia) Sparta Prague	3
6	(Netherlands) John Bosman	(Belgium) KV Mechelen	3
6	(Netherlands) Juul Ellerman	(Netherlands) PSV Eindhoven	3
6	(Brazil) Lima	(Portugal) Benfica	3
6	(Brazil) Ricardo Gomes	(Portugal) Benfica	3
6	(France) Franck Sauzée	(France) Marseille	3
6	(Soviet Union) Eduard Son	(Soviet Union) Dnipro Dnipropetrovsk	3
6	(Bulgaria) Hristo Stoitchkov	(Bulgaria) CSKA Sofia	3
6	(Netherlands) Marco van Basten	(Italy) Milan	3
6	(Austria) Christoph Westerthaler	(Austria) Swarovski Tirol	3
