= Juul Ellerman =

Dutch footballer

Personal information
- Date of birth: 7 October 1965 (age 61)
- Place of birth: Dordrecht, Netherlands
- Height: 1.75 m (5 ft 9 in)
- Positions: Winger; forward

Youth career
- EBOH

Senior career*
Years	Team	Apps	(Gls)
1985–1988	Sparta	70	(26)
1988–1994	PSV	131	(55)
1994–1997	FC Twente	34	(8)
1997–1999	NEC	57	(7)
1999–2002	Helmond Sport	97	(22)
Total		389	(118)

International career
1987–1988	Netherlands U21	7	(3)
1989–1991	Netherlands	5	(0)
- * Club domestic league appearances and goals

Juul Ellerman (born 7 October 1965) is a Dutch former professional footballer, who played as a winger or as a forward.

== Club career ==
Ellerman started his professional career at Sparta and moved to PSV in 1988. He scored twice in a famous 1989 5–1 Champions' Cup win over previous year's finalists Steaua Bucharest with Romário scoring a hattrick and he scored the first ever hat-trick in the UEFA Champions League on 16 September 1992 for PSV Eindhoven against Žalgiris Vilnius in a 6–0 win. In 1994, Ellerman was deemed surplus to requirements and left PSV for FC Twente to replace Boudewijn Pahlplatz who moved the opposite way. He suffered from a serious knee injury and joined NEC in 1997 after Twente manager Hans Meyer said he did not need Ellerman's services anymore.

He retired in 2002 while playing for Helmond Sport.

== International career ==
He was capped for the national under-21 team and made his senior debut for the Netherlands national team in a January 1989 friendly match against Israel. He earned a total of 5 caps, scoring no goals. His final international was a September 1991 friendly against Poland.

== Personal life ==
After retiring as a player, Ellerman worked as a kitchen salesman, in sportshops and for a social employment company in Helmond.

== Honours ==
PSV Eindhoven

- Eredivisie: 1988–89, 1990–91, 1991–92
- KNVB Cup: 1988–89, 1989–90
- Dutch Supercup: 1992
