= 1987–88 European Cup =

European football tournament

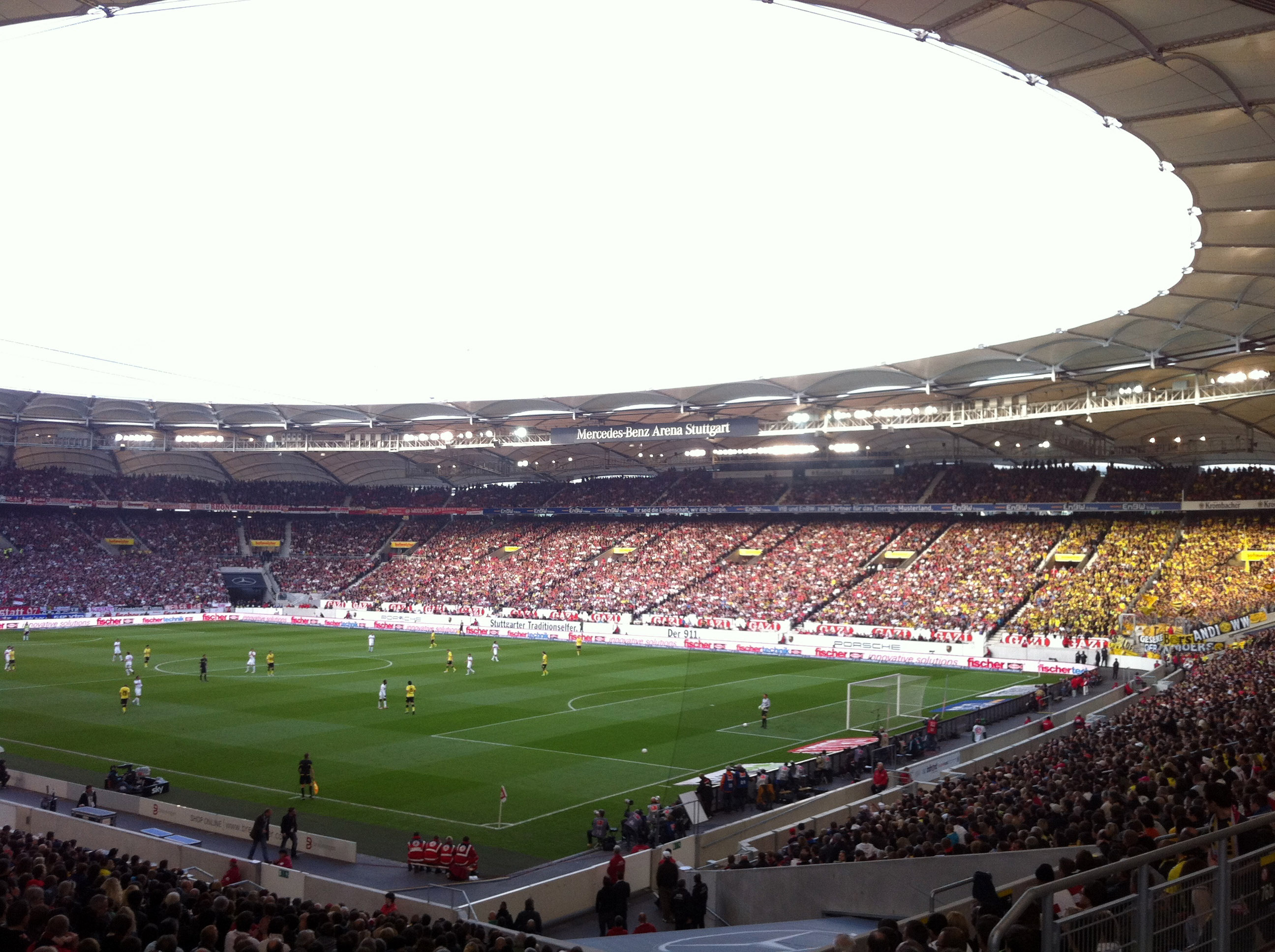
- The Neckarstadion in Stuttgart hosted the final.

Tournament details
- Dates: 16 September 1987 – 25 May 1988
- Teams: 32

Final positions
- Champions: (Netherlands) PSV Eindhoven (1st title)
- Runners-up: (Portugal) Benfica

Tournament statistics
- Matches played: 61
- Goals scored: 140 (2.3 per match)
- Attendance: 1,719,208 (28,184 per match)
- Top scorer(s): Rui Águas (Benfica); Gheorghe Hagi (Steaua București); Rabah Madjer (Porto); Ally McCoist (Rangers); Míchel (Real Madrid); Petar Novák (Sparta Prague); René van der Gijp (Neuchâtel Xamax); 4 goals each

The 1987–88 European Cup was the 33rd season of the European Cup club football tournament. The competition was won for the first time by PSV Eindhoven, who defeated two-time winners Benfica in the final at Neckarstadion in Stuttgart. PSV became the first Dutch team to win the title in 15 years. They also set a record by winning only three matches on their route to the Cup, including no wins from the quarter-final onwards.

Porto, the defending champions, were eliminated by Real Madrid in the second round.

English clubs were still banned, following the Heysel Stadium disaster of 1985, so Everton were denied a place in the competition for the second time in three years.

== Teams ==
(Albania) Partizani (1st)	(Austria) Rapid Wien (1st)	(Belgium) Anderlecht (1st)	(Bulgaria) CSKA Sredets (1st)
(Cyprus) Omonia (1st)	(Czechoslovakia) Sparta Prague (1st)	(Denmark) AGF Aarhus (1st)	(Finland) Kuusysi (1st)
(France) Bordeaux (1st)	(East Germany) BFC Dynamo (1st)	(West Germany) Bayern Munich (1st)	(Greece) Olympiacos (1st)
(Hungary) MTK (1st)	(Iceland) Fram (1st)	(Republic of Ireland) Shamrock Rovers (1st)	(Italy) Napoli (1st)
(Luxembourg) Jeunesse Esch (1st)	(Malta) Ħamrun Spartans (1st)	(Netherlands) PSV Eindhoven (1st)	(Northern Ireland) Linfield (1st)
(Norway) Lillestrøm (1st)	(Poland) Górnik Zabrze (1st)	(Portugal) Benfica (1st)	(Portugal) Porto (2nd)^{TH}
(Romania) Steaua București (1st)	(Scotland) Rangers (1st)	(Spain) Real Madrid (1st)	(Sweden) Malmö FF (1st)
(Switzerland) Neuchâtel Xamax (1st)	(Turkey) Galatasaray (1st)	(Soviet Union) Dynamo Kyiv (1st)	(Socialist Federal Republic of Yugoslavia) Vardar (5th)

== Bracket ==
First round
(Switzerland) Neuchâtel Xamax	5	1	6
(Finland) Kuusysi	0	2	2
(West Germany) Bayern Munich	4	1	5
(Bulgaria) CSKA	0	0	0
(Spain) Real Madrid	2	1	3
(Italy) Napoli	0	1	1
(Portugal) Porto	3	3	6
(Socialist Federal Republic of Yugoslavia) Vardar	0	0	0
(Norway) Lillestrøm	1	4	5
(Northern Ireland) Linfield	1	2	3
(France) Bordeaux	2	2	4
(East Germany) BFC Dynamo	0	0	0
(Austria) Rapid Wien	6	1	7
(Malta) Ħamrun Spartans	0	0	0
(Netherlands) PSV Eindhoven	3	0	3
(Turkey) Galatasaray	0	2	2
(Romania) Steaua București	4	0	4
(Hungary) MTK Budapest	0	2	2
(Republic of Ireland) Shamrock Rovers	0	0	0
(Cyprus) Omonia	1	0	1
(Soviet Union) Dynamo Kyïv	1	0	1
(Scotland) Rangers	0	2	2
(Greece) Olympiacos	1	1	2
(Poland) Górnik Zabrze	1	2	3
(Denmark) Aarhus	4	0	4
(Luxembourg) Jeunesse Esch	1	1	2
(Portugal) Benfica	4	-	w
(Albania) Partizani	0	-	o
(Iceland) Fram	0	0	0
(Czechoslovakia) Sparta Praha	2	8	10
(Sweden) Malmö FF	0	0	0
(Belgium) Anderlecht	1	0	1

Second round
(Switzerland) Neuchâtel Xamax	2	0	2
(West Germany) Bayern Munich	1	2	3
(Spain) Real Madrid	2	2	4
(Portugal) Porto	1	1	2
(Norway) Lillestrøm	0	0	0
(France) Bordeaux	0	1	1
(Austria) Rapid Wien	1	0	1
(Netherlands) PSV Eindhoven	2	2	4
(Romania) Steaua București	3	2	5
(Cyprus) Omonia	1	0	1
(Scotland) Rangers	3	1	4
(Poland) Górnik Zabrze	1	1	2
(Denmark) Aarhus	0	0	0
(Portugal) Benfica	0	1	1
(Czechoslovakia) Sparta Praha	1	0	1
(Belgium) Anderlecht	2	1	3

Quarter-finals
(West Germany) Bayern Munich	3	0	3
(Spain) Real Madrid	2	2	4
(France) Bordeaux	1	0	1
(Netherlands) PSV Eindhoven (a.)	1	0	1
(Romania) Steaua București	2	1	3
(Scotland) Rangers	0	2	2
(Portugal) Benfica	2	0	2
(Belgium) Anderlecht	0	1	1

Semi-finals
(Spain) Real Madrid	1	0	1
(Netherlands) PSV Eindhoven (a.)	1	0	1
(Romania) Steaua București	0	0	0
(Portugal) Benfica	0	2	2

Final
(Netherlands) PSV Eindhoven (p.)	0(6)
(Portugal) Benfica	0(5)

== First round ==
Team 1	Agg.	Team 2	1st leg	2nd leg
Neuchâtel Xamax (Switzerland)	6–2	(Finland) Kuusysi	5–0	1–2
Bayern Munich (West Germany)	5–0	(Bulgaria) CSKA Sredets	4–0	1–0
Real Madrid (Spain)	3–1	(Italy) Napoli	2–0	1–1
Porto (Portugal)	6–0	(Socialist Federal Republic of Yugoslavia) Vardar	3–0	3–0
Lillestrøm (Norway)	5–3	(Northern Ireland) Linfield	1–1	4–2
Bordeaux (France)	4–0	(East Germany) BFC Dynamo	2–0	2–0
Rapid Wien (Austria)	7–0	(Malta) Ħamrun Spartans	6–0	1–0
PSV Eindhoven (Netherlands)	3–2	(Turkey) Galatasaray	3–0	0–2
Steaua București (Romania)	4–2	(Hungary) MTK	4–0	0–2
Shamrock Rovers (Republic of Ireland)	0–1	(Cyprus) Omonia	0–1	0–0
Dynamo Kyiv (Soviet Union)	1–2	(Scotland) Rangers	1–0	0–2
Olympiacos (Greece)	2–3	(Poland) Górnik Zabrze	1–1	1–2
AGF Aarhus (Denmark)	4–2	(Luxembourg) Jeunesse Esch	4–1	0–1
Benfica (Portugal)	4–0	(Albania) Partizani	4–0	(w/o)^{1}
Fram (Iceland)	0–10	(Czechoslovakia) Sparta Prague	0–2	0–8
Malmö FF (Sweden)	1–2	(Belgium) Anderlecht	0–1	1–1

^{1} Partizani Tirana were disqualified due to the behaviour of their players and officials, including having four players sent off in their first leg.

=== First leg ===
16 September 1987
20:00

Neuchâtel Xamax (Switzerland)	5–0	(Finland) Kuusysi
Van der Gijp 9', 20', 75'; Hermann 31'; Sutter 50'	Report

Stade de la Maladière, Neuchâtel
Attendance: 12,200
Referee: René Bindels (Luxembourg)

16 September 1987
20:00

Bayern Munich (West Germany)	4–0	(Bulgaria) CFKA Sredets
Wegmann 32', 64'; Dorfner 37'; Brehme 56'	Report

Olympiastadion, Munich
Attendance: 17,500
Referee: Emilio Soriano Aladrén (Spain)

16 September 1987
21:45

Real Madrid (Spain)	2–0	(Italy) Napoli
Míchel 18' (pen.); De Napoli 76' (o.g.)	Report

Santiago Bernabéu Stadium, Madrid
Attendance: 499 (Note: The match was played behind closed doors due to a UEFA ban for Real Madrid resulting from the incidents during their previous season's semi-final match against Bayern Munich.)
Referee: Ioan Igna (Romania)

16 September 1987
22:30

Porto (Portugal)	3–0	(Socialist Federal Republic of Yugoslavia) Vardar
Madjer 14', 84'; Sousa 51'	Report

Estádio das Antas, Porto
Attendance: 30,000
Referee: Joël Quiniou (France)

16 September 1987
17:45

Lillestrøm (Norway)	1–1	(Northern Ireland) Linfield
Olsen 45'	Report	Baxter 74'

Åråsen Stadion, Lillestrøm
Attendance: 1,123
Referee: Kaj Natri (Finland)

16 September 1987
20:30

Bordeaux (France)	2–0	(East Germany) BFC Dynamo
Bijotat 47'; Ferreri 57'	Report

Stade du Parc Lescure, Bordeaux
Attendance: 12,798
Referee: Carlos Silva Valente (Portugal)

16 September 1987
19:30

Rapid Wien (Austria)	6–0	(Malta) Ħamrun Spartans
Kranjčar 9' (pen.), 43'; Stojadinović 29', 81', 88'; Willfurth 78'	Report

Gerhard Hanappi Stadium, Vienna
Attendance: 6,200
Referee: Janusz Eksztajn (Poland)

16 September 1987
19:30

PSV Eindhoven (Netherlands)	3–0	(Turkey) Galatasaray
Gillhaus 56'; Koeman 75'; Koot 89'	Report

Philips Stadion, Eindhoven
Attendance: 26,000
Referee: José Rosa dos Santos (Portugal)

16 September 1987
16:00

Steaua București (Romania)	4–0	(Hungary) MTK
Hagi 11', 26'; Bölöni 63'; Lăcătuș 83'	Report

Stadionul Steaua, Bucharest
Attendance: 22,500
Referee: Velodi Miminoshvili (Soviet Union)

16 September 1987
20:30

Shamrock Rovers (Republic of Ireland)	0–1	(Cyprus) Omonia
	Report	Theofanous 10'

Tolka Park, Dublin
Attendance: 2,489
Referee: Jean-François Crucke (Belgium)

16 September 1987
18:00

Dynamo Kyiv (Soviet Union)	1–0	(Scotland) Rangers
Mykhaylychenko 74' (pen.)	Report

Republican Stadium, Kyiv
Attendance: 95,000
Referee: Franz Wöhrer (Austria)

16 September 1987
19:30

Olympiacos (Greece)	1–1	(Poland) Górnik Zabrze
Alexiou 19'	Report	Klemenz 27'

Stadio Georgios Karaiskakis, Athens
Attendance: 39,092
Referee: Aron Schmidhuber (West Germany)

16 September 1987
19:00

AGF Aarhus (Denmark)	4–1	(Luxembourg) Jeunesse Esch
Beck Andersen 1'; Lundkvist 8', 19'; Bartram 43' (pen.)	Report	Scholten 73'

Aarhus Idrætspark, Aarhus
Attendance: 3,253
Referee: Jozef Marko (Czechoslovakia)

16 September 1987
22:00

Benfica (Portugal)	4–0	(Albania) Partizani
Hametaj 37' (o.g.); Mozer 81'; Águas 86', 90'	Report

Estádio da Luz, Lisbon
Attendance: 45,000
Referee: José Pes Pérez (Spain)

16 September 1987
18:30

Fram (Iceland)	0–2	(Czechoslovakia) Sparta Prague
	Report	Skuhravý 78'; Novák 86'

Laugardalsvöllur, Reykjavík
Attendance: 871
Referee: Tore Hollung (Norway)

16 September 1987
19:00

Malmö FF (Sweden)	0–1	(Belgium) Anderlecht
	Report	Vervoort 37'

Malmö Stadion, Malmö
Attendance: 10,528
Referee: Manfred Roßner (East Germany)

=== Second leg ===
30 September 1987
19:00

Kuusysi (Finland)	2–1	(Switzerland) Neuchâtel Xamax
Lius 7'; Kousa 28'	Report	Van der Gijp 9'

Lahti Stadium, Lahti
Attendance: 2,218
Referee: Kurt Sørensen (Denmark)

Neuchâtel Xamax won 6–2 on aggregate.

30 September 1987
19:00

CFKA Sredets (Bulgaria)	0–1	(West Germany) Bayern Munich
	Report	Kögl 70'

Natsionalen Stadion Vasil Levski, Sofia
Attendance: 8,000
Referee: Keith Hackett (England)

Bayern Munich won 5–0 on aggregate.

30 September 1987
20:30

Napoli (Italy)	1–1	(Spain) Real Madrid
Francini 9'	Report	Butragueño 44'

Stadio San Paolo, Naples
Attendance: 83,231
Referee: Dieter Pauly (West Germany)

Real Madrid won 3–1 on aggregate.

30 September 1987
17:00

Vardar (Socialist Federal Republic of Yugoslavia)	0–3	(Portugal) Porto
	Report	Sousa 37'; Magalhães 64'; Madjer 66'

Gradski Stadion Skopje, Skopje
Attendance: 17,500
Referee: Paolo Bergamo (Italy)

Porto won 6–0 on aggregate.

30 September 1987
19:30

Linfield (Northern Ireland)	2–4	(Norway) Lillestrøm
McGaughey 40', 67'	Report	Larsen 26', 80'; Håberg 42'; Sognnæs 81'

Windsor Park, Belfast
Attendance: 4,947
Referee: Eysteinn Guðmundsson (Iceland)

Lillestrøm won 5–3 on aggregate.

30 September 1987
17:00

BFC Dynamo (East Germany)	0–2	(France) Bordeaux
	Report	Zlatko Vujović 58'; Ferreri 87'

Friedrich-Ludwig-Jahn-Stadion, East Berlin
Attendance: 18,345
Referee: Bob Valentine (Scotland)

Bordeaux won 4–0 on aggregate.

30 September 1987
15:00

Ħamrun Spartans (Malta)	0–1	(Austria) Rapid Wien
	Report	H. Weber 70'

National Stadium, Attard
Attendance: 500
Referee: Goce Popev (Yugoslavia)

Rapid Wien won 7–0 on aggregate.

30 September 1987
15:00

Galatasaray (Turkey)	2–0	(Netherlands) PSV Eindhoven
Çolak 5'; Nielsen 42' (o.g.)	Report

Ali Sami Yen Stadium, Istanbul
Attendance: 25,412
Referee: Lajos Németh (Hungary)

PSV Eindhoven won 3–2 on aggregate.

30 September 1987
20:00

MTK (Hungary)	2–0	(Romania) Steaua București
Híres 18'; Szeibert 43'	Report

MTK Stadion, Budapest
Attendance: 4,000
Referee: Dimitar Charlatchki (Bulgaria)

Steaua București won 4–2 on aggregate.

30 September 1987
19:00

Omonia (Cyprus)	0–0	(Republic of Ireland) Shamrock Rovers
	Report

Makario Stadium, Nicosia
Attendance: 15,269
Referee: Anton Vasilev (Bulgaria)

Omonia won 1–0 on aggregate.

30 September 1987
19:30

Rangers (Scotland)	2–0	(Soviet Union) Dynamo Kyiv
Falco 24'; McCoist 50'	Report

Ibrox Stadium, Glasgow
Attendance: 43,305
Referee: Ulf Eriksson (Sweden)

Rangers won 2–1 on aggregate.

30 September 1987
17:00

Górnik Zabrze (Poland)	2–1	(Greece) Olympiacos
Cyroń 24'; Iwan 42'	Report	Kostikos 65' (pen.)

Stadion Zabrze, Zabrze
Attendance: 18,100
Referee: Philippe Mercier (Switzerland)

Górnik Zabrze won 3–2 on aggregate.

30 September 1987
19:15

Jeunesse Esch (Luxembourg)	1–0	(Denmark) AGF Aarhus
Theis 67'	Report

Stade de la Frontière, Esch-sur-Alzette
Attendance: 1,600
Referee: Claude Bouillet (France)

AGF Aarhus won 4–2 on aggregate.

30 September 1987

Partizani (Albania)	0–3	(Portugal) Benfica
	Report

Partizani were disqualified due to the behaviour of their players and officials, having four players sent off in their first leg. Benfica qualified on a walkover.

30 September 1987
17:00

Sparta Prague (Czechoslovakia)	8–0	(Iceland) Fram
Hašek 7', 77'; Novák 14', 56', 64'; Griga 17'; Čabala 59'; Chovanec 73'	Report

Stadion Letná, Prague
Attendance: 7,407
Referee: Wieland Ziller (East Germany)

Sparta Prague won 10–0 on aggregate.

30 September 1987
20:00

Anderlecht (Belgium)	1–1	(Sweden) Malmö FF
Vervoort 29'	Report	Engqvist 62'

Constant Vanden Stock Stadium, Brussels
Attendance: 13,000
Referee: Howard King (Wales)

Anderlecht won 2–1 on aggregate.

== Second round ==
Team 1	Agg.	Team 2	1st leg	2nd leg
Neuchâtel Xamax (Switzerland)	2–3	(West Germany) Bayern Munich	2–1	0–2
Real Madrid (Spain)	4–2	(Portugal) Porto	2–1	2–1
Lillestrøm (Norway)	0–1	(France) Bordeaux	0–0	0–1
Rapid Wien (Austria)	1–4	(Netherlands) PSV Eindhoven	1–2	0–2
Steaua București (Romania)	5–1	(Cyprus) Omonia	3–1	2–0
Rangers (Scotland)	4–2	(Poland) Górnik Zabrze	3–1	1–1
AGF Aarhus (Denmark)	0–1	(Portugal) Benfica	0–0	0–1
Sparta Prague (Czechoslovakia)	1–3	(Belgium) Anderlecht	1–2	0–1

=== First leg ===
21 October 1987
20:30

Neuchâtel Xamax (Switzerland)	2–1	(West Germany) Bayern Munich
Lüthi 28'; Sutter 51'	Report	Matthäus 47'

Stade de la Maladière, Neuchâtel
Attendance: 21,322
Referee: Egbert Mulder (Netherlands)

21 October 1987
21:45

Real Madrid (Spain)	2–1	(Portugal) Porto
Sánchez 80'; Sanchís 90'	Report	Madjer 13'

Estadio Luis Casanova, Valencia (Note: The match was played in Valencia instead of Real Madrid's home stadium due to a UEFA stadium ban resulting from the incidents in the previous season's European Cup semifinal between Real Madrid and Bayern Munich.)
Attendance: 42,000
Referee: Keith Hackett (England)

21 October 1987
18:00

Lillestrøm (Norway)	0–0	(France) Bordeaux
	Report

Åråsen Stadion, Lillestrøm
Attendance: 4,267
Referee: Frederick McKnight (Northern Ireland)

21 October 1987
19:30

Rapid Wien (Austria)	1–2	(Netherlands) PSV Eindhoven
Kranjčar 47' (pen.)	Report	Van Aerle 7'; Gillhaus 77'

Gerhard Hanappi Stadium, Vienna
Attendance: 18,000
Referee: Tullio Lanese (Italy)

21 October 1987
14:00

Steaua București (Romania)	3–1	(Cyprus) Omonia
Hagi 14' (pen.), 68'; Iovan 43'	Report	Xiourouppas 38'

Stadionul Steaua, Bucharest
Attendance: 14,584
Referee: Michał Listkiewicz (Poland)

21 October 1987
19:30

Rangers (Scotland)	3–1	(Poland) Górnik Zabrze
McCoist 7'; Durrant 22'; Falco 45'	Report	Urban 58'

Ibrox Stadium, Glasgow
Attendance: 41,366
Referee: Henning Lund-Sørensen (Denmark)

21 October 1987
19:00

AGF Aarhus (Denmark)	0–0	(Portugal) Benfica
	Report

Aarhus Idrætspark, Aarhus
Attendance: 12,479
Referee: Eero Aho (Finland)

21 October 1987
17:00

Sparta Prague (Czechoslovakia)	1–2	(Belgium) Anderlecht
Hašek 9'	Report	Vervoort 27'; Frimann 50'

Stadion Letná, Prague
Attendance: 31,267
Referee: Bruno Galler (Switzerland)

=== Second leg ===
4 November 1987
20:00

Bayern Munich (West Germany)	2–0	(Switzerland) Neuchâtel Xamax
Pflügler 88'; Wegmann 90'	Report

Olympiastadion, Munich
Attendance: 26,500
Referee: Valeri Butenko (Soviet Union)

Bayern Munich won 3–2 on aggregate.

4 November 1987
22:00

Porto (Portugal)	1–2	(Spain) Real Madrid
Sousa 23'	Report	Míchel 54', 69'

Estádio das Antas, Porto
Attendance: 60,000
Referee: Adolf Prokop (East Germany)

Real Madrid won 4–2 on aggregate.

4 November 1987
18:00

Bordeaux (France)	1–0	(Norway) Lillestrøm
Ferreri 41'	Report

Stade du Parc Lescure, Bordeaux
Attendance: 15,397
Referee: Emilio Soriano Aladrén (Spain)

Bordeaux won 1–0 on aggregate.

4 November 1987
19:30

PSV Eindhoven (Netherlands)	2–0	(Austria) Rapid Wien
Lerby 15'; Gillhaus 84'	Report

Philips Stadion, Eindhoven
Attendance: 25,500
Referee: Siegfried Kirschen (East Germany)

PSV Eindhoven won 4–1 on aggregate.

4 November 1987
19:00

Omonia (Cyprus)	0–2	(Romania) Steaua București
	Report	Christofi 8' (o.g.); Lăcătuș 35'

Makario Stadium, Nicosia
Attendance: 14,448
Referee: Plarent Kotherja (Albania)

Steaua București won 5–1 on aggregate.

4 November 1987
17:00

Górnik Zabrze (Poland)	1–1	(Scotland) Rangers
Orzeszek 63'	Report	McCoist 41' (pen.)

Stadion Zabrze, Zabrze
Attendance: 18,700
Referee: Gerasimos Germanakos (Greece)

Rangers won 4–2 on aggregate.

4 November 1987
22:00

Benfica (Portugal)	1–0	(Denmark) AGF Aarhus
Nunes 38'	Report

Estádio da Luz, Lisbon
Attendance: 47,500
Referee: Philippe Mercier (Switzerland)

Benfica won 1–0 on aggregate.

4 November 1987
20:00

Anderlecht (Belgium)	1–0	(Czechoslovakia) Sparta Prague
Nilis 14'	Report

Constant Vanden Stock Stadium, Brussels
Attendance: 16,000
Referee: Bob Valentine (Scotland)

Anderlecht won 3–1 on aggregate.

== Quarter-finals ==
Team 1	Agg.	Team 2	1st leg	2nd leg
Bayern Munich (West Germany)	3–4	(Spain) Real Madrid	3–2	0–2
Bordeaux (France)	1–1 (a)	(Netherlands) PSV Eindhoven	1–1	0–0
Steaua București (Romania)	3–2	(Scotland) Rangers	2–0	1–2
Benfica (Portugal)	2–1	(Belgium) Anderlecht	2–0	0–1

=== First leg ===
2 March 1988
20:15

Bayern Munich (West Germany)	3–2	(Spain) Real Madrid
Pflügler 39'; Eder 45'; Wohlfarth 47'	Report	Butragueño 85'; Sánchez 90'

Olympiastadion, Munich
Attendance: 70,000
Referee: Paolo Casarin (Italy)

2 March 1988
20:30

Bordeaux (France)	1–1	(Netherlands) PSV Eindhoven
Touré 21'	Report	Kieft 40'

Stade du Parc Lescure, Bordeaux
Attendance: 26,928
Referee: Dieter Pauly (West Germany)

2 March 1988
14:00

Steaua București (Romania)	2–0	(Scotland) Rangers
Pițurcă 2'; Iovan 67'	Report

Stadionul Steaua, Bucharest
Attendance: 16,124
Referee: Luigi Agnolin (Italy)

2 March 1988
22:00

Benfica (Portugal)	2–0	(Belgium) Anderlecht
Magnusson 16'; Chiquinho 19'	Report

Estádio da Luz, Lisbon
Attendance: 100,000
Referee: Dušan Krchňák (Czechoslovakia)

=== Second leg ===
16 March 1988
21:00

Real Madrid (Spain)	2–0	(West Germany) Bayern Munich
Janković 26'; Míchel 41'	Report

Estadio Santiago Bernabéu, Madrid
Attendance: 78,000
Referee: Alexis Ponnet (Belgium)

Real Madrid won 4–3 on aggregate.

16 March 1988
19:30

PSV Eindhoven (Netherlands)	0–0	(France) Bordeaux
	Report

Philips Stadion, Eindhoven
Attendance: 27,000
Referee: Erik Fredriksson (Sweden)

1–1 on aggregate; PSV Eindhoven won on away goals.

16 March 1988
19:30

Rangers (Scotland)	2–1	(Romania) Steaua București
Gough 16'; McCoist 32' (pen.)	Report	Lăcătuș 3'

Ibrox Stadium, Glasgow
Attendance: 44,000
Referee: Bruno Galler (Switzerland)

Steaua București won 3–2 on aggregate.

16 March 1988
20:00

Anderlecht (Belgium)	1–0	(Portugal) Benfica
Guðjohnsen 63'	Report

Constant Vanden Stock Stadium, Brussels
Attendance: 37,650
Referee: Keith Hackett (England)

Benfica won 2–1 on aggregate.

== Semi-finals ==
Team 1	Agg.	Team 2	1st leg	2nd leg
Real Madrid (Spain)	1–1 (a)	(Netherlands) PSV Eindhoven	1–1	0–0
Steaua București (Romania)	0–2	(Portugal) Benfica	0–0	0–2

=== First leg ===
6 April 1988
21:00

Real Madrid (Spain)	1–1	(Netherlands) PSV Eindhoven
Sánchez 6' (pen.)	Report	Linskens 19'

Santiago Bernabéu Stadium, Madrid
Attendance: 90,000
Referee: George Courtney (England)

6 April 1988
16:00

Steaua București (Romania)	0–0	(Portugal) Benfica
	Report

Stadionul Steaua, Bucharest
Attendance: 21,789
Referee: Karl-Heinz Tritschler (West Germany)

=== Second leg ===
20 April 1988
19:30

PSV Eindhoven (Netherlands)	0–0	(Spain) Real Madrid
	Report

Philips Stadion, Eindhoven
Attendance: 26,500
Referee: Bruno Galler (Switzerland)

1–1 on aggregate; PSV Eindhoven won on away goals.

20 April 1988
22:00

Benfica (Portugal)	2–0	(Romania) Steaua București
Águas 22', 33'	Report

Estádio da Luz, Lisbon
Attendance: 120,000
Referee: Michel Vautrot (France)

Benfica won 2–0 on aggregate.

== Final ==
25 May 1988
20:15

PSV Eindhoven (Netherlands)	0–0 (a.e.t.)	(Portugal) Benfica
	Report
Penalties
Koeman (penalty scored); Kieft (penalty scored); Nielsen (penalty scored); Vanenburg (penalty scored); Lerby (penalty scored); Janssen (penalty scored)	6–5	(penalty scored) Elzo; (penalty scored) Dito; (penalty scored) Hajry; (penalty scored) Pacheco; (penalty scored) Mozer; (penalty missed) Veloso

Neckarstadion, Stuttgart
Attendance: 64,000
Referee: Luigi Agnolin (Italy)

== Top scorers ==
The top scorers from the 1987–88 European Cup are as follows:

Rank	Name	Team	Goals	Minutes played
1	(Czechoslovakia) Petar Novák	(Czechoslovakia) Sparta Prague	4	185
1	(Netherlands) René van der Gijp	(Switzerland) Neuchâtel Xamax	4	270
1	(Algeria) Rabah Madjer	(Portugal) Porto	4	349
1	(Scotland) Ally McCoist	(Scotland) Rangers	4	435
1	(Portugal) Rui Águas	(Portugal) Benfica	4	597
1	(Romania) Gheorghe Hagi	(Romania) Steaua București	4	675
1	(Spain) Míchel	(Spain) Real Madrid	4	720
8	(West Germany) Jürgen Wegmann	(West Germany) Bayern Munich	3	179
8	(France) Jean-Marc Ferreri	(France) Bordeaux	3	345
8	(Czechoslovakia) Ivan Hašek	(Czechoslovakia) Sparta Prague	3	360
8	(Socialist Federal Republic of Yugoslavia) Zlatko Kranjčar	(Austria) Rapid Wien	3	360
8	(Portugal) António Sousa	(Portugal) Porto	3	360
8	(Socialist Federal Republic of Yugoslavia) Zoran Stojadinović	(Austria) Rapid Wien	3	360
8	(Mexico) Hugo Sánchez	(Spain) Real Madrid	3	450
8	(Belgium) Patrick Vervoort	(Belgium) Anderlecht	3	495
8	(Romania) Marius Lăcătuș	(Romania) Steaua București	3	578
8	(Netherlands) Hans Gillhaus	(Netherlands) PSV Eindhoven	3	647
