= Peremoha Stadium =

Stadium in Kamianske, Ukraine

- Pobeda
- Interactive map of Peremoha Stadium
- Location: Kamianske, Ukraine
- Coordinates: 48.517616°N 34.597351°E
- Owner: SC Prometei Kamianske
- Surface: Grass

Construction
- Opened: 1953-1955

Tenant
- SC Prometei Kamianske

Training field of Peremoha Stadium

Peremoha Stadium is the main city stadium in Kamianske, Ukraine.
