= Mikhail Markhel =

Belarusian footballer (born 1966)

Personal information
- Full name: Mikhail Mikhailovich Markhel
- Date of birth: 10 March 1966 (age 60)
- Place of birth: Minsk, Belarusian SSR, Soviet Union
- Height: 1.81 m (5 ft 11 in)
- Position: Forward

Team information
- Current team: Belarus U19 (manager)

Youth career
- 1984–1986: Shinnik Bobruisk

Senior career*
Years	Team	Apps	(Gls)
1986–1987	Dinamo Minsk	0	(0)
1987–1988	Dnepr Mogilev	51	(22)
1988–1991	Dinamo Minsk	63	(12)
1992	Budućnost Titograd	7	(1)
1992	Nyíregyháza Spartacus	3	(0)
1993–1994	Spartak Vladikavkaz	58	(19)
1995	Torpedo Moscow	15	(1)
1996	Chernomorets Novorossiysk	18	(3)
1999	Torpedo-MAZ Minsk	14	(0)
1999	Molodechno	9	(2)
2000–2001	Zvezda-VA-BGU Minsk	29	(5)
Total		267	(65)

International career
1994	Belarus	3	(0)

Managerial career
- 1997–1999: Dinamo Minsk (youth)
- 2000–2002: Zvezda-VA-BGU Minsk
- 2002–2003: Dinamo Brest (assistant)
- 2003–2004: Dinamo Minsk (assistant)
- 2004: Dinamo Brest (assistant)
- 2004–2005: Dinamo Brest
- 2006: Belshina Bobruisk
- 2007: Darida Minsk Raion (assistant)
- 2008: Lokomotiv Minsk (assistant)
- 2012–2013: Belarus (assistant)
- 2014–2015: Belarus U17
- 2015–2017: Belarus U19
- 2016: Shakhtyor Soligorsk (assistant)
- 2018–2019: Belarus U21
- 2019–2021: Belarus
- 2021: Belarus U18
- 2022–2023: Belarus U19
- * Club domestic league appearances and goals

Mikhail Mikhailovich Markhel (Russian: Михаил Михайлович Мархель, Belarusian: Міхаіл Міхайлавіч Мархель; born 10 March 1966) is a Belarusian professional football coach and former player. He is the manager of the Belarus U19 national team.

== Club career ==
As a player, Markhel made his professional debut in the Soviet Second League in 1987 for Dnepr Mogilev. He played two games in the UEFA Cup 1993–94 for Spartak Vladikavkaz. He later played abroad with Budućnost Podgorica in the 1991–92 Yugoslav First League and with Nyíregyháza Spartacus in Hungary, before playing in the Russian Premier League with Spartak Vladikavkaz, Torpedo Moscow and Chernomorets Novorossiysk.

== International career ==
Markhel played three matches for the Belarus national team in 1994.

== Personal life ==
His brother Yuri Markhel is also a professional footballer.

== Managerial statistics ==
As of match played 30 March 2021

Team	From	To	Record				
Team	From	To	G	W	D	L	Win %
Belarus	2019	2021	19	7	3	9	36.84

== External sources ==
- Biography at Pressball
