= Sergei Neyman =

Russian footballer

Sergei Neyman Серге́й Нейман
Personal information
- Full name: Sergei Vladimirovich Neyman
- Date of birth: 25 September 1967 (age 59)
- Place of birth: Leningrad, Soviet Union
- Height: 1.78 m (5 ft 10 in)
- Position: Defender

Youth career
- Smena Leningrad

Senior career*
Years	Team	Apps	(Gls)
1984–1985	FC Zenit Leningrad	0	(0)
1986	FC Dynamo Leningrad	25	(0)
1987	FC Dynamo-2 Moscow	0	(0)
1988–1989	FC Dynamo Moscow	11	(0)
1990	Real Betis	7	(0)
1990–1991	FC Dynamo Moscow	5	(0)
1991	FC Spartak Vladikavkaz	6	(0)
1992	FC Rotor Volgograd	3	(0)
1992–1993	FC Avangard Kolomna	59	(14)
1993	MYPA	2	(1)
1994–1997	NK Beltinci	84	(10)
1997–1999	NK Zadar	52	(2)
1999–2000	Bnei Yehuda Tel Aviv	4	(0)
2000	FC Krasnoznamensk	34	(2)
2001	FC Volga Ulyanovsk	1	(0)
2001	FC Krasnoznamensk	25	(2)
- * Club domestic league appearances and goals

Sergei Vladimirovich Neyman (Russian: Серге́й Владимирович Нейман; born 25 September 1967) is a former Soviet and Russian professional footballer.

== Club career ==
He made his debut in the Soviet Top League in 1988 for FC Dinamo Moscow.

== Honours ==
- Soviet Top League bronze: 1990.
