= Mieczysław Szewczyk =

Polish footballer (born 1962)

Personal information
- Date of birth: 11 September 1962 (age 64)
- Place of birth: Oświęcim, Poland
- Height: 1.75 m (5 ft 9 in)
- Position: Midfielder

Senior career*
Years	Team	Apps	(Gls)
- Zatorzanka Zator
1979–1981	Unia Oświęcim		
1981–1992	Ruch Chorzów	290	(42)
1993–1996	Wuppertaler SV	43	(4)
1997–1999	Górnik Brzeszcze		
1999–2003	Pasjonat Dankowice		

International career
1987	Poland	1	(0)
- * Club domestic league appearances and goals

Mieczysław Szewczyk (born 11 September 1962) is a Polish former professional footballer who played as a midfielder, notably for Ruch Chorzów and German club Wuppertaler SV.

He made one appearance for the Poland national team in 1987.

His sons Kamil and Michał are also footballers.

== Honours ==
Ruch Chorzów

- Ekstraklasa: 1988–89
- II liga West: 1987–88
