= Eduard Son =

Kazakhstani footballer (born 1964)

Personal information
- Full name: Eduard Vasilyevich Son
- Date of birth: 18 August 1964 (age 62)
- Place of birth: Karaganda, Kazakh SSR
- Height: 1.76 m (5 ft 9 1/2 in)
- Position: Forward

Senior career*
Years	Team	Apps	(Gls)
1981–1985	FC Kairat	31	(2)
1986–1987	FC Iskra Smolensk	76	(9)
1988–1991	FC Dnipro Dnipropetrovsk	96	(27)
1991–1993	GFCO Ajaccio	32	(13)
1993–1994	Perpignan Sporting	27	(14)
1994–1999	Roanne-Riorges	?	(?)
- * Club domestic league appearances and goals

Eduard Vasilyevich Son (Russian: Эдуард Васильевич Сон; born 18 August 1964) is a retired Soviet and Kazakhstani professional football player of Korean ethnic origin. He lives in France.

== Honours ==
- Soviet Top League champion: 1988.
- Soviet Top League runner-up: 1989.
- Soviet Cup winner: 1989.
- USSR Super Cup winner: 1989.
- USSR Federation Cup winner: 1989.
- USSR Federation Cup finalist: 1990.

== European club competitions ==
With FC Dnipro Dnipropetrovsk.

- 1988–89 UEFA Cup: 2 games.
- 1989–90 European Cup: 5 games, 3 goals.
- 1990–91 UEFA Cup: 2 games.
