= Petar Novák =

Czech footballer

Personal information
- Date of birth: 24 August 1962 (age 64)
- Place of birth: Czechoslovakia
- Position: Striker

Senior career*
Years	Team	Apps	(Gls)
- Sparta Prague
- * Club domestic league appearances and goals

Petar Novák (born 24 August 1962) is a Czech former professional footballer who played as a striker.

== Career ==
While playing for Sparta Prague, Novák was top scorer of the 1988 European Cup, scoring a total of four goals in the competition.

After retiring as a player, Novák qualified as a doctor, and has worked as the team physician for former club Sparta Prague.
