= 2001–02 S.L. Benfica season =

Benfica
2001–02 season
- President: Manuel Vilarinho
- Head coach: Toni (until 27 December 2001); Jesualdo Ferreira
- Stadium: Estádio da Luz
- Primeira Liga: 4th
- Taça de Portugal: Fifth round
- Top goalscorer: League: Mantorras (13); All: Mantorras (13)
- Highest home attendance: 80,000 v Porto (15 September 2001)
- Lowest home attendance: 5,000 v Farense (18 March 2002)
- Biggest win: Benfica 5–0 Farense (18 March 2002)
- Biggest defeat: Benfica 0–2 União de Leiria (3 March 2002)
Home colours	Away colours

The 2001–02 season, covering the period from 1 July 2001 to 30 June 2002, was Sport Lisboa e Benfica's 98th season in existence and the club's 68th consecutive season in the top flight of Portuguese football. Benfica competed domestically in the Primeira Liga and the Taça de Portugal (Portuguese Cup), but did not take part in European football due to their league finish in the previous season.

Expectations were high with head coach Toni, who had been part of Benfica's wins in 1988–89 and 1993–94, starting his third complete season with the team. In the transfer market, the club shipped out regular starters from the past seasons and brought in new players, mixing the experience of Zlatko Zahovič and Ljubinko Drulović with acquisitions Pedro Mantorras and Simão Sabrosa. By December the team was still in the title race after seven wins and seven draws. However, that month the team suffered its first defeat, a close draw against Sporting, and their exit from the Taça de Portugal. These setbacks caused Toni to resign and be replaced by his assistant, Jesualdo Ferreira. After the change, Ferreira guided the team to third-place by late March, where several injuries in key players impacted their momentum. They finished the season with 17 wins, twelve draws and five losses, putting them in fourth place and keeping them out of the European league for another year.

== Season summary ==
=== Pre-season ===
After the worst season since the start of the Primeira Liga, Benfica made significant changes, starting with bringing in former president of Futebol Clube de Alverca Luís Filipe Vieira to run all football-related affairs. One of his first decisions was transferring players deemed surplus to the new project, including Serhiy Kandaurov, Ronaldo Guiaro, José Calado, and both strikers of the previous season, Pierre van Hooijdonk and João Tomás. Argel Fucks, Ljubinko Drulović and Zlatko Zahovič, all players who gained notability at Porto, were added to the team, along with the highly expected Pedro Mantorras and Simão Sabrosa, the latter costing a record 12 million Euros. With Simão's signing, Filipe Vieira stated, "Now we have a dream-team".

The pre-season started on 5 July in Lisbon, followed by four games in Nyon, Switzerland, beginning 14 July. Later in the month, Benfica returned to Portugal for two more games, playing Feyenoord in Guimarães and closing against Fiorentina on 5 August.

=== August–October ===
Benfica started the 2001–02 Primeira Liga campaign on the road against Varzim on 11 August 2001. The game ended with a 2–2 draw, after a stoppage time own-goal from Benfico's Paulo Cabral. A week later, Benfica had its opening game at home, defeating Salgueiros 2–0, with both goals in the second half. They closed the month with a second home win, as Mantorras scored three past Vitória Setúbal in a 3–2 win.

Benfica opened September at Estádio Mário Duarte against home team Beira-Mar. The team took a two-goal lead and "looked like the certain winner" according to João Marcelino of Record, but after a penalty committed by Diogo Luís, Beira-Mar took the lead in four minutes. With Benfica trailing by one, Tomo Šokota scored in the 58th minute to make the final score 3–3. Benfico's next game was a Clássico against Porto on 15 September. The match ended with a 0–0 draw but, as João Marcelino commented, Benfica "built more opportunities to score". On the following Sunday, Benfica visited Belenenses, dropping two more points in the rankings with a one-all draw; it had been a full month since their last victory. On 30 September, Benfica received Alverca. The game ended with a 3–2 win for Benfica, finishing the month just three points shy of the leader, Boavista.

Benfica started October on the road against former manager José Mourinho with União de Leiria. A final score of 1–1 made the fifth draw in just eight games for Benfica, but the team still gained a point on the title race, as Boavista and Porto were tied for first. Their second match of October was played in Da Luz against Gil Vicente on the 20th, and resulted in a 2–0 win for Benfica, after João Mawete opened the score in the second half. They played Farense away on the 26th, where a 2–0 win carried Benfica to second place and ended their eight-month streak without winning an away game.

=== November–February ===
Benfica played Vitória Guimarães at home in the beginning of November, resulting in a 0–0 draw that brought Benfica down to third place. On the 17th, Benfica made its debut in the 2001–02 Taça de Portugal, playing Infesta at Matosinhos. They won the game 3–0, with two goals right at the end of first half, an own goal and a penalty. In the last week of November, Benfica played visitor to Braga, winning 1–0 after Mantorras unlocked the game in the 69th minute. It was the club's first away win against Braga since November 1995.

December opened with a home game against Santa Clara. The guests took an early lead, but Simão evened the score only fifteen minutes later; Mantorras then set the final score at a 2–1 win. On 8 December, Benfica played Paços de Ferreira on the road. Although they would have reached first place in the Primeira Liga standings if they had won, Benfica "did not perform to expectations, as the defence was a disaster", according to Manuel Queiroz of Record. The game ended in a 1–2 loss, the first loss of the season. Four days later, Benfica played a fifth round Taça de Portugal game against Marítimo. The game went into overtime after no goals from either team in regular time; Two minutes into overtime, Marítimo scored. Benfica evened the score in the 116th minute, narrowly avoiding its second loss in a row. On 15 December, Benfica hosted Sporting. The game ended in a 2–2 draw, despite Benfica leading by two nil until the last five minutes, when Mário Jardel scored a double and saved the cross-town rivals from defeat. On the 19th, Benfica went to Madeira to play in the Portuguese Cup in a rematch against Marítimo. A sole goal from Mitchell van der Gaag knocked Benfica out of the competition. Benfica's last game of 2001 was on the road against Boavista. An early goal from Boavista made the game very difficult, as Manuel Queiroz explained in his match analysis: "It was a game at their [Boavista's] style. Ball in the center, intense fighting, score early and then manage time, free-kicks and bookings... Benfica could not connect two passes, and even make a single imminent goal threat". With that the team took a second league loss. Four days later, Toni resigned, with Benfica looking for Mourinho to return. Disagreements over the composition of the technical staff caused Mourinho to decline the invitation, so Benfica turned to assistant manager Jesualdo Ferreira to lead the team.

Benfica opened the new year at home, once more against Marítimo; the game ended 1–1 as the eighth draw of the season, sliding Benfica down to fifth place in the league. On the 8th, Benfica added Edgaras Jankauskas on loan from Real Sociedad to their roster, strengthening a sector that only had Mantorras as reliable option. In the second week of January, Benfica played Varzim at home. After trailing at halftime 2–0, Benfica scored three in less than fifteen minutes for a final score of 3–2, the first win since 2 December. Three days later, Benfica improved its squad again, signing Tiago Mendes from Braga, with Armando Sá also moving to Lisbon. On 19 January, with Tiago already in the lineup, Benfica played Salgueiros at Estádio Engenheiro Vidal Pinheiro. The game ended in a 4–1 win for Benfica, defined by Record as the team's "first comfortable win in the league, and the first improvements after the comatose state that led to managerial change". On the final Sunday of the month, Benfica visited Bonfim to face Vitória de Setúbal. Benfica scored first with a goal from Carlitos in the 20th minute, but couldn't keep the lead, resulting in yet another draw.

On 3 February, Benfica received Beira-Mar in Da Luz. António Tadeira characterized the game for Record, complementing the team's effectiveness: "The unprecedented scoring ratio, turned a poor and colourless performance into a satisfying thrashing". The 4–1 win brought Benfica to third place. A week later, Benfica faced Porto at Estádio das Antas for the Clássico. Despite Simão scoring first, Benfica's old rival reversed the game, giving the team a 2–3 loss that dropped them to fourth place. On 17 February, the team played Belenenses at home, winning 2–1 with a last minute goal from Jankauskas. Benfica played the last game of February on the 24th, away at Alverca. They managed to take a two-goal lead halfway through the second half, with goals by Zahovic and João Manuel Pinto Tomé. The last goal in the 3–1 win was netted by Drulovic one minute before regular time ended. With the end of February, Benfica was placed fourth in the league standings. (Note: Same points as Porto, but lost the head-to-head)

=== March–May ===
In the opening match of March, Benfica faced União de Leiria at home. The game ended with a 0–2 loss, the first ever win for the visitors in Da Luz, with José Manuel Delgado and Luís Pedro Sousa criticizing the team for a "really poor game of the home side". Benfica recovered their step when they played Gil Vicente at Estádio Adelino Ribeiro Novo on the 9th; they took an early lead in the first half with a goal by Argel, with Drulovic doubling the score fifteen minutes later for a 2–0 victory. On 18 March, Benfica played Farense at home. Jesualdo played Simão upfront, and as Joaquim Semeano of Record stated, "the small-great player confirmed his good momentum, giving speed to the game every time he touched the ball". The team won 5–0 and regained third place over Porto. They went on to win their third match in a row against Vitória Guimarães at the Estádio D. Afonso Henriques with a score of 4–1, including a double from Miguel Monteiro. However, just days later, Simão was severely injured while playing for the Portugal national football team, and was expected to miss several months. At the last game of the month, Benfica hosted Braga with Jankauskas, Simão and Sokota all sidelined by injuries. Without any firepower, the team took a 1–1 draw, allowing Porto to catch up in the league race.

Benfica opened April in Azores against Santa Clara on the 6th. Lacking attacking options, the team was unable to score and ended with a goalless draw; they remained ahead of Porto only with the goal difference. On 14 April, Benfica received Paços de Ferreira at home. With two goals in the first half and another two in the second, the team won 4–0 and remained in third. A week later, Benfica visited Sporting for the second Lisbon derby of the season. Despite a first score by Jankauskas, a mistake by Armando Sá allowed Sporting's Jardel to score from the penalty spot. With its third draw in just one month, Benfica was overtaken by Porto in the league table, dropping to fourth. On the 28th, Benfica hosted Boavista, knowing that by beating them, they would award the league title to Sporting. The meet ended with a 2–1 win for Benfica, after Mantorras took advantage of an error from Bassey William Andem in the 81st minute, confirming the second title in three years for Sporting.

Benfica played its last game of the season on 5 May, on the road against Marítimo. They closed the season with a 2–3 loss. 17 wins, twelve draws and five losses during the season gave Benfica a league score of 63 points, putting the team 12 behind champion Sporting, but crucially, five behind Porto, placing fourth and missing out on UEFA competitions for a second year in a row.

== Competitions ==
=== Overall record ===
Competition	First match	Last match	Record								
Competition	First match	Last match	G	W	D	L	GF	GA	GD	Win %	Source
Primeira Liga	11 August 2001	5 May 2002	34	17	12	5	66	37	+29	50.00	
Taça de Portugal	17 November 2001	19 December 2001	3	1	1	1	4	2	+2	33.33	
Total			37	18	13	6	70	39	+31	48.65	

=== Primeira Liga ===
==== League table ====
Pos	Team	Pld	W	D	L	GF	GA	GD	Pts	Qualification or relegation
2	Boavista	34	21	7	6	53	20	+33	70	Qualification to Champions League second qualifying round
3	Porto	34	21	5	8	66	34	+32	68	Qualification to UEFA Cup first round
4	Benfica	34	17	12	5	66	37	+29	63	
5	Belenenses	34	17	6	11	54	44	+10	57	Qualification to Intertoto Cup second round
6	Marítimo	34	17	5	12	48	35	+13	56	

Source: Primeira Divisão
Rules for classification: 1) points; 2) head-to-head points; 3) head-to-head goal difference; 4) goal difference; 5) number of goals scored

==== Results by round ====
Round	1	2	3	4	5	6	7	8	9	10	11	12	13	14	15	16	17	18	19	20	21	22	23	24	25	26	27	28	29	30	31	32	33	34
Ground	A	H	H	A	H	A	H	A	H	A	H	A	H	A	H	A	H	H	A	A	H	A	H	A	H	A	H	A	H	A	H	A	H	A
Result	D	W	W	D	D	D	W	D	W	W	D	W	W	L	D	L	D	W	W	D	W	L	W	W	L	W	W	W	D	D	W	D	W	L
Position	9	2	1	4	5	3	4	3	2	2	3	3	2	3	4	4	5	5	3	5	3	4	4	4	4	4	3	3	3	3	3	4	4	4

Source: FootballPortugal
A = Away; H = Home; W = Win; D = Draw; L = Loss

==== Matches ====
11 August 2001 1	Varzim	2–2	Benfica	Póvoa de Varzim
20:30	Fumo 83'; Cabral 96' (o.g.)	Report	Zlatko Zahovič 15'; Fernando Meira 47'; Pesaresi (red card) 60'; Porfirio (red card) 95'	Stadium: Estádio do Varzim Sport Club; Attendance: 7,500; Referee: Isidoro Rodrigues

19 August 2001 2	Benfica	2–0	Salgueiros	Lisbon
21:15	Tomo Šokota 54'; Zlatko Zahovič 74'	Report		Stadium: Estádio da Luz; Attendance: 50,000; Referee: João Vilas Boas

25 August 2001 3	Benfica	3–2	Vitória Setúbal	Lisbon
21:00	Mantorras 32', 37', 69'	Report	Marco Ferreira 21'; Eliseu (yellow card) 66' (yellow-red card) 84'; Hugo Henrique 87'; Costa (red card) 89'	Stadium: Estádio da Luz; Attendance: 40,000; Referee: Pedro Proença

9 September 2001 4	Beira Mar	3–3	Benfica	Aveiro
21:15	Hugo 44' (pen.); Fary 46', 48'	Report	Mantorras 2'; Drulović 27'; Tomo Šokota 58'	Stadium: Estádio Mário Duarte; Referee: Isidoro Rodrigues

15 September 2001 5	Benfica	0–0	Porto	Lisbon
21:00		Report		Stadium: Estádio da Luz; Attendance: 80,000; Referee: Duarte Gomes

23 September 2001 6	Belenenses	1–1	Benfica	Lisbon
20:30	Marcão 67'	Report	Mantorras 52'	Stadium: Estádio do Restelo; Attendance: 6,000; Referee: Augusto Duarte

30 September 2001 7	Benfica	3–2	Alverca	Lisbon
21:00	Júlio César 7', 21'; Drulović 82'	Report	Anderson Luiz 10', 86'	Stadium: Estádio da Luz; Attendance: 30,000; Referee: Paulo Costa

13 October 2001 8	União Leiria	1–1	Benfica	Leiria
20:30	Derlei 41'	Report	Mawete 46'	Stadium: Estádio Dr. Magalhães Pessoa; Attendance: 5,000; Referee: Bruno Paixão

20 October 2001 9	Benfica	2–0	Gil Vicente	Lisbon
19:00	Mawete 50'; Fernando Meira 79'	Report	Sérgio Lomba (yellow card) 58' (yellow-red card) 79'	Stadium: Estádio da Luz; Attendance: 17,800; Referee: Jacinto Paixão

26 October 2001 10	Farense	0–2	Benfica	Faro
21:30		Report	Hugo Gomes 37' (o.g.); Simão 89'	Stadium: Estádio de São Luís; Attendance: 8,000; Referee: Duarte Gomes

3 November 2001 11	Benfica	0–0	Vitória Guimarães	Lisbon
20:00		Report		Stadium: Estádio da Luz; Attendance: 45,000; Referee: Pedro Proença

24 November 2001 12	Braga	0–1	Benfica	Braga
20:30	Idalécio (red card) 60'	Report	Mantorras 69'; Cabral (red card) 71'	Stadium: Estádio 1º de Maio; Attendance: 20,000; Referee: João Ferreira

2 December 2001 13	Benfica	2–1	Santa Clara	Lisbon
19:00	Simão 20' (pen.); Mantorras 40'; Caneira (yellow card) 74' (yellow-red card) 89'	Report	Rui Gregório 4'	Stadium: Estádio da Luz; Attendance: 30,000; Referee: Bruno Paixão

8 December 2001 14	Paços de Ferreira	2–1	Benfica	Paços de Ferreira
21:00	Zé Manel 10'; Leonardo 25'	Report	João Manuel Pinto 13'	Stadium: Estádio da Mata Real; Attendance: 7,000; Referee: Martins dos Santos

15 December 2001 15	Benfica	2–2	Sporting	Lisbon
20:00	Simão 11' (pen.); Andrade (yellow card) 37' (yellow-red card) 53'; Zlatko Zahovič 55'	Report	Mário Jardel 85' (pen.), 87'	Stadium: Estádio da Luz; Attendance: 75,000; Referee: Duarte Gomes

23 December 2001 16	Boavista	1–0	Benfica	Porto
18:00	Silva 6'	Report		Stadium: Estádio do Bessa; Attendance: 10,000; Referee: Pedro Proença

5 January 2002 17	Benfica	1–1	Marítimo	Lisbon
21:15	Mantorras 25'	Report	Gaúcho 9'	Stadium: Estádio da Luz; Attendance: 6,000; Referee: Paulo Baptista

12 January 2002 18	Benfica	3–2	Varzim	Lisbon
19:00	Simão 47'; Jankauskas 53'; Carlitos 61'	Report	Marco Freitas 9'; Margarido 44'	Stadium: Estádio da Luz; Attendance: 12,000; Referee: Bruno Paixão

19 January 2002 19	Salgueiros	1–4	Benfica	Porto
21:15	João Pedro 45'	Report	Júlio César 18'; Jankauskas 48', 73'; Simão 88'	Stadium: Estádio Engenheiro Vidal Pinheiro; Attendance: 3,500; Referee: Olegário Benquerença

27 January 2002 20	Vitória Setúbal	1–1	Benfica	Setúbal
20:00	Ico 57'	Report	Carlitos 20'	Stadium: Estádio do Bonfim; Attendance: 14,000; Referee: Duarte Gomes

3 February 2002 21	Benfica	4–1	Beira Mar	Lisbon
19:30	Simão 41'; Jankauskas 46', 81'; Mantorras 90'	Report	Juninho Petrolina 6'	Stadium: Estádio da Luz; Attendance: 14,200; Referee: Pedro Proença

10 February 2002 22	Porto	3–2	Benfica	Porto
21:15	Deco 42'; Alenichev 49'; Capucho 54'	Report	Simão 18'; Mantorras 55'	Stadium: Estádio das Antas; Attendance: 46.225; Referee: João Ferreira

17 February 2002 23	Benfica	2–1	Belenenses	Lisbon
19:30	Simão 40'; Jankauskas 90+6'	Report	Verona 43'	Stadium: Estádio da Luz; Attendance: 26,000; Referee: Martins dos Santos

24 February 2002 24	Alverca	1–3	Benfica	Alverca
20:00	Cajú 79'	Report	Zlatko Zahovič 57'; João Manuel Pinto 59'; Drulović 89'	Stadium: Complexo Desportivo do Alverca FC; Attendance: 4,000; Referee: José Pratas

3 March 2002 25	Benfica	0–2	União Leiria	Lisbon
17:45		Report	Maciel 38'; Derlei 62'	Stadium: Estádio da Luz; Attendance: 24,500; Referee: Paulo Paraty

9 March 2002 26	Gil Vicente	0–2	Benfica	Barcelos
20:30		Report	Argel 3'; Drulović 20'	Stadium: Estádio Adelino Ribeiro Novo; Attendance: 6,000; Referee: Carlos Xistra

18 March 2002 27	Benfica	5–0	Farense	Lisbon
21:00	Simão 18', 90'; Tiago 49'; Miguel 52'; Drulović 76'	Report		Stadium: Estádio da Luz; Attendance: 5,000; Referee: Pedro Henriques

23 March 2002 28	Vitória Guimarães	1–4	Benfica	Guimarães
19:00	Romeu (red card) 37'; Fangueiro 48'	Report	Miguel 34', 90'; Simão 70' (pen.); Zlatko Zahovič 77'	Stadium: Estádio D. Afonso Henriques; Attendance: 13,680; Referee: Duarte Gomes

30 March 2002 29	Benfica	1–1	Braga	Lisbon
17:00	Zlatko Zahovič 71' (pen.)	Report	Abiodun 52'	Stadium: Estádio da Luz; Attendance: 16,200; Referee: Isidoro Rodrigues

6 April 2002 30	Santa Clara	0–0	Benfica	Ponta Delgada
19:00		Report		Stadium: Estádio de São Miguel; Attendance: 10,000; Referee: João Vilas Boas

14 April 2002 31	Benfica	4–0	Paços de Ferreira	Lisbon
19:00	Andersson 25'; Miguel 43', 70'; Jankauskas 81'	Report		Stadium: Estádio da Luz; Attendance: 12,850; Referee: Vítor Pereira

21 April 2002 32	Sporting	1–1	Benfica	Lisbon
21:30	Mário Jardel 89' (pen.)	Report	Jankauskas 73'; Argel (yellow card) 61' (yellow-red card) 89'; Zlatko Zahovič (yellow card) 4' (yellow-red card) 89'	Stadium: Estádio de Alvalade; Attendance: 42,290; Referee: Martins dos Santos

28 April 2002 33	Benfica	2–1	Boavista	Lisbon
20:45	Argel 54'; Pesaresi (yellow card) 61' (yellow-red card) 76'; Mantorras 81'	Report	Erwin Sánchez 40'	Stadium: Estádio da Luz; Attendance: 20,000; Referee: Paulo Baptista

5 May 2002 34	Marítimo	3–2	Benfica	Funchal
16:00	Gaúcho 49', 86' (pen.); Kenedy 72'	Report	Mantorras 38', 55'; Toni (red card) 84'	Stadium: Estádio dos Barreiros; Attendance: 10,000; Referee: Lucílio Baptista

=== Taça de Portugal ===
17 November 2001 Fourth Rd	Infesta	0–3	Benfica	Infesta, Matosinhos
18:00		Report	Marcelo 38' (o.g.); Drulović 40' (pen.); Hugo Porfírio 90'	Stadium: Parque de Jogos Manuel Ramos; Referee: Paulo Pereira

12 December 2001 Fifth Rd	Benfica	1–1 (a.e.t.)	Marítimo	Lisbon
21:15	Zlatko Zahovič 116'	Report	Joaquim Ferraz 92'	Stadium: Estádio da Luz; Referee: Lucílio Baptista

19 December 2001 5R Replay	Marítimo	1–0	Benfica	Funchal
16:00	Van der Gaag 17'	Report		Stadium: Estádio dos Barreiros; Referee: Paulo Paraty

=== Friendlies ===
13 July 2001	Benfica	3–2	Alverca	Caldas da Rainha, Portugal
21:00	Fernando Meira; Mantorras; Tomo Šokota 88'	Report	Anderson Luiz 13'; Tinaia 90'	Stadium: Campo da Mata; Attendance: 10,000

17 July 2001	Gland	0–13	Benfica	Gland, Switzerland
19:00		Report	Fernando Meira 2'; Bruno Aguiar 6'; Zlatko Zahovič 27', 37'; Miguel 29'; João Tomás 31'; Drulovic 41'; Tomo Šokota 50', 60'; Rui Baião 57'; Porfirio 58'; Mantorras 81'; Carlitos 90'	Stadium: Sporting Center En Bord; Attendance: 3,000; Referee: Jean-Luc Schmid

18 July 2001	Bastia	0–1	Benfica	Yverdon, Switzerland
19:00		Report	Mantorras 8'	Stadium: Stade Municipal; Attendance: 5,000

22 July 2001	Bordeaux	2–2	Benfica	Bordeaux, France
19:00	Alexey Smertin 12'; Paulo Miranda 61'	Report	Hugo Porfírio 56'; Miguel 83'	Stadium: Stade Chaban-Delmas

26 July 2001	Benfica	1–0	Galatasaray	Geneva, Switzerland
21:00	Tomo Šokota 45'	Report		Stadium: Stade de Genève

2 August 2001	Benfica	2–1	Feyenoord	Guimarães, Portugal
21:00	Mantorras 6', 84'	Report	Tomasson 25'	Stadium: Estádio D. Afonso Henriques; Attendance: 10,000; Referee: Duarte Gomes

5 August 2001	Benfica	1–0	Fiorentina	Lisbon, Portugal
21:00	Argel 7'	Report		Stadium: Estádio da Luz; Attendance: 80,000

== Player statistics ==
The squad for the season consisted of the players listed in the tables below, as well as staff members Toni (manager) and Jesualdo Ferreira (manager).

Note 1: Flags indicate national team as defined under FIFA eligibility rules. Players may hold more than one non-FIFA nationality.

Note 2: Players with squad numbers marked ‡ joined the club during the 2001–02 season via transfer, with more details in the following section.

No.	Pos	Nat	Player	Total		Primeira Liga		Taça de Portugal	
No.	Pos	Nat	Player	Apps	Goals	Apps	Goals	Apps	Goals
1	GK	(Germany) GER	Robert Enke	28	-32	25	-30	3	-2
2	DF	(Portugal) POR	Toni	1	0	1	0	0	0
3^{‡}	DF	(Brazil) BRA	Argélico Fucks	24	2	22	2	2	0
4^{‡}	DF	(Portugal) POR	Paulo Cabral	14	0	13	0	1	0
5^{‡}	DF	(Brazil) BRA	Júlio César	22	3	21	3	1	0
6	DF	(Portugal) POR	Fernando Meira	18	2	15	2	3	0
7^{‡}	MF	(Sweden) SWE	Anders Andersson	25	1	23	1	2	0
9^{‡}	FW	(Angola) ANG	Mantorras	33	13	30	13	3	0
10	MF	(Slovenia) SLO	Zlatko Zahovič	23	7	21	6	2	1
11^{‡}	MF	(Federal Republic of Yugoslavia) YUG	Ljubinko Drulović	34	6	31	5	3	1
12	GK	(Portugal) POR	José Moreira	10	-7	10	-7	0	0
13	DF	(Portugal) POR	Diogo Luís	3	0	3	0	0	0
14	MF	(Portugal) POR	Ednilson	22	0	22	0	0	0
15^{‡}	DF	(Italy) ITA	Emanuele Pesaresi	13	0	11	0	2	0
16^{‡}	DF	(Portugal) POR	João Manuel Pinto	29	2	26	2	3	0
17	DF	(Portugal) POR	Ricardo Esteves	0	0	0	0	0	0
18	MF	(Portugal) POR	Carlitos	14	2	14	2	0	0
19	DF	(Portugal) POR	Geraldo Alves	0	0	0	0	0	0
20^{‡}	MF	(Portugal) POR	Simão Sabrosa	28	11	26	11	2	0
21^{‡}	DF	(Portugal) POR	Marco Caneira	29	0	27	0	2	0
22	MF	(Portugal) POR	Luís Andrade	13	0	11	0	2	0
23	DF	(Portugal) POR	Miguel Monteiro	29	5	27	5	2	0
25^{‡}	FW	(Croatia) CRO	Tomo Šokota	7	2	7	2	0	0
26^{‡}	MF	(Portugal) POR	Hugo Porfírio	6	1	4	0	2	1
27	FW	(Portugal) POR	João Tomás	1	0	1	0	0	0
28^{‡}	MF	(Canada) CAN	Fernando Aguiar	27	0	27	0	0	0
29^{‡}	FW	(Lithuania) LTU	Edgaras Jankauskas	12	8	12	8	0	0
30^{‡}	MF	(Portugal) POR	Tiago Mendes	15	1	15	1	0	0
31^{‡}	DF	(Mozambique) MOZ	Armando Sá	13	0	13	0	0	0
33	GK	(Portugal) POR	Paulo Lopes	0	0	0	0	0	0
35	MF	(Portugal) POR	Bruno Aguiar	3	0	3	0	0	0
37	MF	(Portugal) POR	Rui Baião	10	0	7	0	3	0
42	DF	(Portugal) POR	Jorge Ribeiro	5	0	4	0	1	0
47	FW	(Portugal) POR	Pepa	3	0	3	0	0	0
50	FW	(Angola) ANG	João Mawete	15	2	12	2	3	0

== Transfers ==
=== In ===
Entry date	Position	Player	From club	Fee	Ref
18 April 2001	ST	Pedro Mantorras	Alverca	Undisclosed	
29 May 2001	FB	Paulo Cabral	Belenenses	Free	
2 June 2001	CB	Argel Fucks	Palmeiras	Undisclosed	
3 June 2001	FB	Quim Berto	Sporting	Free	
11 June 2001	MF	Ronald García	Bolívar	Undisclosed	
13 June 2001	LW	Ljubinko Drulović	Porto	Free	
21 June 2001	AM	Zlatko Zahovič	Valencia	Trade for Marchena	
20 June 2001	ST	Tomo Šokota	Dinamo Zagreb	Undisclosed	
3 July 2001	CM	Anders Andersson	Aalborg	Undisclosed	
8 July 2001	CB	João Manuel Pinto	Porto	Free	
11 July 2001	LW	Hugo Porfírio	Marítimo	Free	
27 July 2001	LW	Simão Sabrosa	Barcelona	€12M	
11 December 2001	DM	Fernando Aguiar	Beira-Mar	Undisclosed	
15 January 2002	CM	Tiago Mendes	Braga	Undisclosed	
15 January 2002	RB	Armando Sá	Braga	Undisclosed	

=== In by loan ===
Date from	Position	Player	To club	Date to	Ref
13 July 2001	LB	Emanuele Pesaresi	Lazio	30 June 2002	
20 July 2001	CB	Júlio César	Real Madrid	30 June 2002	
2 August 2001	LB	Marco Caneira	Inter Milan	30 June 2002	
8 January 2002	ST	Edgaras Jankauskas	Real Sociedad	30 June 2002	

=== Out ===
Exit date	Position	Player	To club	Fee	Ref
29 May 2001	LB	Alejandro Escalona	River Plate	Free	
31 May 2001	RB	Serhiy Kandaurov	Metalist Kharkiv	Free	
8 June 2001	CM	Chano	None	Retired	
17 June 2001	DM	Triantafyllos Machairidis	Alki Larnaca	Undisclosed	
20 June 2001	CB	Carlos Marchena	Valencia	Trade for Zahoviċ	
1 July 2001	DM	Marco Freitas	Salgueiros	Free	
5 July 2001	CM	Maniche	Benfica B	Demoted	
13 July 2001	ST	Pierre van Hooijdonk	Feyenoord	Undisclosed	
14 July 2001	ST	Toy	Salgueiros	Free	
26 July 2001	CB	Ronaldo Guiaro	Beşiktaş	Free	
4 August 2001	DM	Sérgio Nunes	Santa Clara	Free	
9 August 2001	CM	José Calado	Bétis	Undisclosed	
28 August 2001	ST	João Tomás	Bétis	Undisclosed	
8 November 2001	FB	Rojas	River Plate	Free	
28 December 2001	DM	Fernando Meira	Stuttgart	Undisclosed	
1 January 2002	CB	Nuno Abreu	Oliveirense	Free	
16 January 2002	RW	Sabry	Marítimo	Free	
22 January 2002	CB	José Soares	Istres	Free	

=== Out by loan ===
Date from	Position	Player	To club	Date to	Ref
6 July 2001	MF	Ronald García	Alverca	30 June 2004	
10 July 2001	AM	Roger	Fluminense	30 June 2002	
12 July 2001	ST	André Neles	Marítimo	30 June 2002	
25 August 2001	GK	Carlos Bossio	Vitória Setúbal	30 June 2002	
28 November 2001	FB	Quim Berto	Varzim	30 June 2002	
19 December 2001	CB	Geraldo Alves	Beira-Mar	30 June 2002	
15 January 2002	DM	Ricardo Esteves	Braga	30 June 2002	
15 January 2002	FW	João Mawete	Braga	30 June 2002	
15 January 2002	CM	Bruno Aguiar	Gil Vicente	30 June 2002	
16 January 2002	LB	Diogo Luís	Alverca	30 June 2002	
16 January 2002	ST	André Neles	Vitória	31 December 2002	
