= 2000–01 S.L. Benfica season =

Benfica
2000–01 season
- President: João Vale e Azevedo (until 27 October 2000); Manuel Vilarinho
- Head coach: Jupp Heynckes (until 20 September 2000); José Mourinho (until 5 December 2000); Toni
- Stadium: Estádio da Luz
- Primeira Liga: 6th
- Taça de Portugal: Sixth round
- UEFA Cup: First round
- Top goalscorer: League: Van Hooijdonk (19); All: Van Hooijdonk (23)
- Highest home attendance: 82,500 v Boavista (25 February 2001)
- Lowest home attendance: 7,000 v Alverca (4 May 2001)
- Biggest win: Vitória de Guimarães 0–4 Benfica (18 November 2000); Benfica 5–1 Desportivo das Aves (13 January 2001)
- Biggest defeat: Porto 4–0 Benfica (23 January 2001)
Home colours	Away colours

The 2000–01 season was Sport Lisboa e Benfica's 97th season in existence, and the club's 67th consecutive season in the Primeira Liga. It ran from 1 July 2000 to 30 June 2001. Benfica competed domestically in the Primeira Liga and the Taça de Portugal. The club also participated in the UEFA Cup, by virtue of finishing third in that tournament the previous season.

The season is the worst in Benfica's illustrious history since the start of the Primeira Liga during 1934–35. The club switched managers two times. Jupp Heynckes was replaced by José Mourinho in September. Toni, who previously guided the club to a league title, took the reins in December. In the transfer market, young players like Marchena and Fernando Meira were brought in, and mixed with the experience of 31 year-old, Pierre van Hooijdonk, who arrived to replace Nuno Gomes, were meant to improve the team competitiveness. However, the biggest event of the pre-season was the release of João Pinto, the longest-serving player on the club, and the incumbent captain. This decision was poorly received by the fans, who criticized Heynckes and the president for the move. Both would leave the club in the following months. In the league campaign, the team lacked balance year-round and only briefly entered the league race, spending all but three weeks out the top three. Even the successful partnership of Pierre van Hooijdonk and João Tomás, with 36 goals between them, did not prevent the club from finishing in sixth place, 23 points behind winner Boavista. Consequently, Benfica missed out on UEFA competitions for the first time in 41 years (since the 1959–60 season).

== Season summary ==
=== Pre-season ===
Preparations for a new Benfica season started in late-May 2000. Manager Jupp Heynckes remained for a second year, with more control this time in building up the squad. His choices caused immediate controversy, the biggest being the release of Benfica veteran João Pinto. Pinto was the incumbent team captain and the longest-serving player, who had been at Benfica since the 1992–93 season. José Manuel Delgado of Record predicted a difficult season for the German manager: "...he will have less tolerance from the fans than that offered to Artur Jorge (three match days), or Manuel José (four match days)..." He forwent internationals like Paulo Bento and Amaral, but indulged on Marchena, Meira and Van Hooijdonk. The last was intended to replace Nuno Gomes, who moved to Fiorentina after a successful run at Euro 2000. All of this spending happened in spite of club-wide financial difficulties, from missed salaries for Michael Thomas, to the basketball section of the club going months without pay.

The pre-season started on 7 July, with a schedule of 8 games. It included a match celebrating the 50th anniversary of Olympique Lyon, and the Carlsberg Belfast Challenge against Linfield and Liverpool. Benfica ended the pre-season on 11 August, with a draw against Aston Villa.

=== August–October ===
Benfica started their 2000–01 Primeira Liga campaign on the road in a Clássico match against FC Porto, on 19 August 2000. João Marcelino stated that Porto "...had some luck in the way they obtained their first goal (shot from Alenichev deflected off Calado and betrayed Enke)...", allowing them to manage the lead until the end. Benfica's first home game was against Beira-Mar on 27 August. At ten minutes into the second half of that game, Maniche's goal put Benfica up 3–0, setting them up for victory.

September began for Benfica with a visit to Leiria. It was a hard-fought match, in which referee José Leirós gave out twelve bookings. They narrowly escaped defeat when Chano scored in stoppage time. Benfica started their European season on 14 September in Sweden, with a 1–2 loss to host Halmstad. Benfica won their second home game of the season, on 18 September, against Estrela da Amadora, thanks to two goals scored by Van Hooijdonk in consecutive minutes near the end of regulation time. In the post-match interview, following weeks of fan pressure, club manager Heynckes lost his calm and proclaimed: "I can't take this club anymore. If they want me gone, I'll leave tomorrow." He was immediately let go, and replaced with 37-year-old José Mourinho. Former player Mozer joined him as assistant. It was Mourinho's first time as manager, having previously worked only as an assistant manager for Bobby Robson and Louis van Gaal. His first game as manager was on the road against Boavista, in which his team lost 0–1 to a goal from ex-Benfica player Duda. The second leg of the UEFA Cup was a home game played on 28 September at the Estádio da Luz. It ended in a 2–2 draw and they were eliminated from the tournament – a result reminiscent of their 1997–98 season.

Benfica started October with a home game against Braga. The visitors took the lead in the first half, but João Tomás and Van Hooijdonk responded with a goal each, reversing the score in the second half. However, Braga went on to equalize with a last-minute goal, costing Benfica two points. On 15 October, Benfica won its third league game of the season by defeating Belenenses one–nil behind Marchena's goal. The team played Paços de Ferreira on the 21st, dropping two points in a 0–0 draw. Benfica played their last game of the month against Campomaiorense on the 29th, winning with a double from João Tomás, scored within a space of ten minutes from each other. They finished the month in seventh place on the league table, nine points behind leader Porto.

=== November–February ===
Benfica faced Marítimo in an away game at the beginning of November. They lost 0–3, to a hat-trick from Lagorio. Without a single road game victory, the team dropped to tenth in the league's standings. They hosted Farense in the second week of November and won 2–1. Van Hooijdonk and João Tomás scored a goal each, within a 4-minute interval just before the final whistle, to give their team the three points. On 18 November, Benfica played Vitória de Guimarães on the road. They took the lead near the end of the first half, with a goal from Chano. The second half saw three additional goals, all by João Tomás. It was their first win as visitors, and they climbed to sixth place in the standings. Benfica played their last game of the month, on the 26th, at the Taça de Portugal against Campomaiorense. This fourth round match was won thanks to a late goal by Sabry.

Benfica started December with a Lisbon derby game against Sporting. They won 3–0, with a first half goal by Van Hooijdonk and two goals in a five-minute span from João Tomás. Following the win, Mourinho requested a contract extension as a demonstration of faith in the work he had put in along with his assistant: "Me [Mourinho] and Mozer thought that the only way to end speculation and the constant threat of being sacked in the event of a bad result...was renewing our contracts for another season." Their proposal was not met. They parted ways with the club through an announcement in a press conference: "He [President Vilarinho] thought it was better not to accept our request. We understood that decision showed a lack of trust in our work, and that we should offer our resignation..." Benfica immediately appointed Toni – a long-time favourite of the President – as the new manager. On 10 December, Benfica played Alverca away from home. They opened the score sheet with a goal from João Tomás close to half-time, but Mantorras equalized. Later, Milinkovic put the Ribatejo side in the lead, resulting in the fourth loss in seven matches in away games for Benfica. In the last match of the year 2000, Benfica met a struggling Gil Vicente, who were at the bottom of the Primeira Liga standings. Unable to unlock the 0–0 draw, the club suffered their eighth winless league game of the season.

Early in January, Benfica played away from home, at Louletano, in a fifth round match of the Taça de Portugal. They won 3–1 and progressed to the next knock-out stage, where they would face Porto. Benfica resumed their league campaign on the 7th, visiting Salgueiros. They won their second away game, after Van Hooijdonk scored with nine minutes remaining on the clock. They went on to win their third match in a row on 13 January, with a 5–1 home-game win against Desportivo Aves. Benfica took an early lead with a Van Hooijdonk goal in the 15th minute, and added two more in the first half, one by Carlitos and another from an own goal. The Dutch striker added two more goals to his tally in the second half. On 17 January, Benfica received Porto for the first of three consecutive games against them. The first game was part of the Taça de Portugal and ended in a 1–1 draw. Maniche scored the lone Benfica goal before Maric equalized for Porto. A rematch was held to settle the tie. Four days later, on Sunday, Benfica hosted Porto for a Portuguese league match. They defeated the visitors 2–1, after a goal from Van Hooijdonk in the 81st minute. This win allowed the club to climb to fourth in the league's standings – their best position all year. The last of three games saw Benfica succumb to a four-nil loss in the rematch for the Portuguese Cup. Manuel Queiroz wrote: "...A thrashing that did not transpire what really happened in the field, because Fernando Santos' team – in the best performance of the season – completely demolished a Benfica that never entered the game..." Benfica's last game of the month was played on the road on the 29th, against the Aveiro side, Beira-Mar. The match ended with a 3–1 win for Benfica, after another double for Van Hooijdonk. João Tomás also got on the score sheet.

On 4 February, the team beat União de Leiria at home by 3 goals to 2. Benfica took the lead with a goal from João Tomás. Roger and Van Hooijdonk increased their lead by two goals, until Nuno Valente settled the final score. With this win, Benfica climbed to second place the league, now only five points behind leader Boavista. On the 16th, Benfica played Estrela da Amadora away from home. The game ended with a 2–1 victory for Benfica. Along with Boavista's loss in Braga, this further reduced Benfica's separation from the league leader. Benfica played their last match of February on the 25th against Boavista. Benfica had an opportunity to take the top place in the league table with a victory in that game, but they were unsuccessful at breaking the 0–0 draw. Van Hooijdonk had the best chance in the 78th minute, but his attempt struck the goalpost.

=== March–May ===
Benfica began March with an away game in Braga. They lost 3–1 in their first league loss since December. They dropped to fourth place in the standings. On the following Saturday, Benfica visited Belenenses and lost for a second time in a row. A week later, Benfica received Paços de Ferreira at home. The match ended with a 3–2 win for the visitors and Benfica dropped to fifth place. They were now eleven points behind leader Boavista. In the last game of March, Benfica faced Campomaiorense on the road. With a 1–1 draw, the team avoided losing all of their matches in March. However, their need to get points was aggravated, especially if they wanted to qualify for the European competitions.

In April, Benfica opened at home against Marítimo, with a squad composed mainly of reserve players. A 3–0 win helped get closer to both Braga and Sporting in the standings. On 13 April, Benfica visited Faro. The match ended in a 2–2 draw despite a Benfica having a first-half lead. Nine days later, Benfica played Vitória de Guimarães at home. A sole goal from Sabry in the 31st minute was enough to secure the team's second win in April. Closing out the month, Benfica travelled to Alvalade for the second Lisbon derby of the season. The game ended in a 3–0 loss for Benfica. This was the Lions' best result against Benfica since the 1986–87 season.

On 4 May, Benfica played Alverca at home, where they lost 0–2, and in the writing of João Querido Manhã for Record, the fans "burst into protests at the end, after they lost patience with the errors, passivity and lack of talent of the whole team.". On 13 May, Benfica went to Adelino Ribeiro Novo to face Gil Vicente. The game ended in a 3–0 defeat – their tenth loss within the league, matching their previous record in the 1996–97 season. As a result, the club was overtaken by Belenenses in the league table. A week later, Benfica played host to Salgueiros in Da Luz. A final score of 1–1 saved Benfica from a record fourth straight loss, and gave the Porto-based side their first point all season against a top 7 team. Benfica played the last game of the season against Desportivo de Aves on the road. At one point in the game, the team was losing three-nil, but managed to equalize and finish with a four-all draw. Toni stated that "Everyone did not do their best to avoid that a historic club slipped into a position that is not accustomed." Benfica finished in a record-breaking sixth place after the 34-game season with a tally of 15 wins, 9 draws and 10 losses that, together, summed up to 54 points. They were ninth-lowest league-wide in goals conceded – 44 in all. On the plus side, they were fifth best in the league at goal-scoring, with a total of 54 goals. Consequently, Benfica missed out on UEFA competitions for the first time in 41 years (since the 1959–60 season). Van Hooijdonk was the second most productive player in the Primeira Liga with 19 goals.

== Results ==
Win Draw Loss Postponed

=== Overall record ===
Competition	First match	Last match	Record								
Competition	First match	Last match	G	W	D	L	GF	GA	GD	Win %	Source
Primeira Liga	19 August 2000	27 May 2001	34	15	9	10	54	44	+10	44.12	
Taça de Portugal	26 November 2000	23 January 2001	4	2	1	1	5	6	−1	50.00	
UEFA Cup	14 September 2000	28 September 2000	2	0	1	1	3	4	−1	0.00	
Total			40	17	11	12	62	54	+8	42.50	

=== Primeira Liga ===
==== League table ====
Pos	Team	Pld	W	D	L	GF	GA	GD	Pts
4	Braga	34	16	9	9	58	48	+10	57
5	União de Leiria	34	15	11	8	46	41	+5	56
6	Benfica	34	15	9	10	54	44	+10	54
7	Belenenses	34	14	10	10	43	36	+7	52
8	Beira-Mar	34	14	7	13	45	49	−4	49

Source: Primeira Divisão
Rules for classification: 1) points; 2) head-to-head points; 3) head-to-head goal difference; 4) goal difference; 5) number of goals scored

==== Results by round ====
Round	1	2	3	4	5	6	7	8	9	10	11	12	13	14	15	16	17	18	19	20	21	22	23	24	25	26	27	28	29	30	31	32	33	34
Ground	A	H	A	H	A	H	H	A	H	A	H	A	H	A	H	A	H	H	A	H	A	H	A	A	H	A	H	A	H	A	H	A	H	A
Result	L	W	D	W	L	D	W	D	W	L	W	W	W	L	D	W	W	W	W	W	W	D	L	L	L	D	W	D	W	L	L	L	D	D
Position	17	7	7	7	8	9	8	9	7	10	7	6	6	6	6	5	5	4	4	2	2	3	4	4	5	5	5	5	5	5	5	6	5	6

Source: FootballPortugal
A = Away; H = Home; W = Win; D = Draw; L = Loss

==== Matches ====
19 August 2000 1	Porto	2–0	Benfica	Porto
21:15	Jorge Costa 23'; Alenichev 43'	Report	Rojas (yellow card) 43' (yellow-red card) 44'	Stadium: Estádio das Antas; Attendance: 50,000; Referee: António Costa

27 August 2000 2	Benfica	4–1	Beira Mar	Lisbon
19:30	Sabry 17'; Poborský 26'; Maniche 55'; Van Hooijdonk 72'	Report	Òscar 65'	Stadium: Estádio da Luz; Attendance: 20,000; Referee: Isidoro Rodrigues

9 September 2000 3	União Leiria	1–1	Benfica	Leiria
20:30	Éder Gaúcho 82'	Report	Sabry (yellow card) 71' (yellow-red card) 81'; Chano 89'	Stadium: Estádio Dr. Magalhães Pessoa; Attendance: 9,000; Referee: José Leirós

18 September 2000 4	Benfica	2–1	Estrela da Amadora	Lisbon
21:15	Van Hooijdonk 88', 89'	Report	Djalma 79'	Stadium: Estádio da Luz; Attendance: 30,000; Referee: Olegário Benquerença

23 September 2000 5	Boavista	1–0	Benfica	Porto
20:00 GMT	Duda 2'; Pedro Emanuel (yellow card) 81'; Litos (yellow card) 86'	Report	van Hooijdonk (yellow card) 71'; Maniche (red card) 88'	Stadium: Estádio do Bessa; Attendance: 8,000; Referee: José Pratas

2 October 2000 6	Benfica	2–2	Braga	Lisbon
19:00 GMT	Poborský (yellow card) 40'; Chano (yellow card) 46'; João Tomás 61' (yellow card) 79'; Sabry (yellow card) 74' van Hooijdonk 75'; Ronaldo (yellow card) 79'; Dani (yellow card) 87'	Report	Rodrigo Aniceto (yellow card) 26'; Fehér 34'; Barroso (yellow card) 52'; Odair (yellow card) 58'; Zé Nuno (yellow card) 65'; Artur Jorge 90'	Stadium: Estádio da Luz; Attendance: 15,000; Referee: Lucílio Baptista

15 October 2000 7	Benfica	1–0	Belenenses	Lisbon
19:30 GMT	Miguel (yellow card) 17'; Marchena 32'; Sérgio Nunes (yellow card) 62' (yellow-red card) 78'; Sabry (yellow card) 64'; Carlitos (yellow card) 67'; Chano (yellow card) 72'	Report	Tuck (yellow card) 25'; Pedro Henriques (yellow card) 33'; Verona (yellow card) 84'; Cléber (yellow card) 88'; Neca (yellow card) 89'	Stadium: Estádio da Luz; Attendance: 25,000; Referee: Isidoro Rodrigues

21 October 2000 8	Paços de Ferreira	0–0	Benfica	Paços de Ferreira
20:00 GMT	Marco Paulo (yellow card) 37'; João Armando (red card) 42'; Rafael (yellow card) 59'; Glauber (yellow card) 79'	Report	Fernando Meira (yellow card) 17'; Diogo Luís (yellow card) 33'; Chano (yellow card) 48'	Stadium: Estádio da Mata Real; Attendance: 7,000; Referee: Lucílio Baptista

29 October 2000 9	Benfica	2–0	Campomaiorense	Lisbon
19:00 GMT	Ricardo Rojas (yellow card) 5'; Chano (yellow card) 70'; Paulo Madeira (yellow card) 73'; João Tomás 75', 85' (yellow card) 76'	Report	Zaharievski (yellow card) 21'; Poejo (yellow card) 61' (yellow-red card) 71'; Araque (yellow card) 81'; Torrão (yellow card) 86'	Stadium: Estádio da Luz; Attendance: 50,000; Referee: Francisco Ferreira

5 November 2000 10	Maritimo	3–0	Benfica	Funchal
19:00 GMT	Lagorio 13', 53', 59' (yellow card) 14'; Porfírio (yellow card) 20'; Iliev (yellow card) 57'	Report	Marchena (yellow card) 18'	Stadium: Estádio dos Barreiros; Attendance: 9,000; Referee: José Pratas

12 November 2000 11	Benfica	2–1	Farense	Lisbon
20:00 GMT	Calado (yellow card) 80' van Hooijdonk 84' (pen.); João Tomás 88'	Report	Marco Nuno 73'; Rubio (yellow card) 83'	Stadium: Estádio da Luz; Attendance: 15,000; Referee: António Costa

18 November 2000 12	Vitória Guimarães	0–4	Benfica	Guimarães
19:00 GMT	Preto Casagrande (yellow card) 37'	Report	Carlitos (yellow card) 24'; Chano 40'; João Tomás 60', 84', 88'; Diogo Luís (yellow card) 69'; Ricardo Rojas (yellow card) 74'	Stadium: Estádio D. Afonso Henriques; Attendance: 9,300; Referee: Olegário Benquerença

3 December 2000 13	Benfica	3–0	Sporting	Lisbon
20:00 GMT	van Hooijdonk (yellow card) 38' (goal) 41' (pen.); Maniche (yellow card) 41'; Marchena (yellow card) 48'; Fernando Meira (yellow card) 60'; João Tomás 77', 82'	Report	Beto Acosta (yellow card) 29'; André Cruz (yellow card) 40'; Pedro Barbosa (red card) 75'; Horváth (yellow card) 89'; Beto (yellow card) 90'	Stadium: Estádio da Luz; Attendance: 65,000; Referee: Jorge Coroado

10 December 2000 14	Alverca	2–1	Benfica	Alverca
20:00	Mantorras 43'; Milinković 79'	Report	João Tomás 39'	Stadium: Complexo Desportivo do Alverca FC; Attendance: 5,000; Referee: João Ferreira

17 December 2000 15	Benfica	0–0	Gil Vicente	Lisbon
19:00		Report		Stadium: Estádio da Luz; Attendance: 10,000; Referee: Cunha Antunes

7 January 2001 16	Salgueiros	1–2	Benfica	Porto
21:15	Basílio Almeida 52'; Litera (yellow card) 16' (yellow-red card) 62'	Report	Chano 60'; Van Hooijdonk 81'	Stadium: Estádio Engenheiro Vidal Pinheiro; Attendance: 3,500; Referee: Paulo Paraty

13 January 2001 17	Benfica	5–1	Desportivo Aves	Lisbon
19:00	Van Hooijdonk 15', 50', 65' (pen.); Nené 30' (o.g.); Carlitos 39'	Report	Quinzinho 61'	Stadium: Estádio da Luz; Attendance: 30,000; Referee: Francisco Ferreira

21 January 2001 18	Benfica	2–1	Porto	Lisbon
21:00	Van Hooijdonk 26' (pen.), 80'	Report	Capucho 41'	Stadium: Estádio da Luz; Attendance: 69,950; Referee: António Costa

29 January 2001 19	Beira Mar	1–3	Benfica	Aveiro
21:15	Fary 82'	Report	Van Hooijdonk 38', 60' (pen.); João Tomás 79'	Stadium: Estádio Mário Duarte; Attendance: 8,000; Referee: Vítor Pereira

4 February 2001 20	Benfica	3–2	União Leiria	Lisbon
17:45	João Tomás 5'; Roger 44'; Van Hooijdonk 47' (pen.)	Report	Éder Gaúcho 25'; Derlei (red card) 44'; Bilro (yellow card) 44' (yellow-red card) 54'; Nuno Valente 67'	Stadium: Estádio da Luz; Attendance: 20,000; Referee: Bruno Paixão

16 February 2001 21	Estrela da Amadora	1–2	Benfica	Lisbon
20:00	Gaúcho 14'	Report	Van Hooijdonk 20'; João Tomás 64'; (yellow card) 49' (yellow-red card) 88' Escalona	Stadium: Estádio José Gomes; Attendance: 7,000; Referee: Jorge Coroado

25 February 2001 22	Benfica	0–0	Boavista	Lisbon
20:45		Report		Stadium: Estádio da Luz; Attendance: 82,500; Referee: José Pratas

4 March 2001 23	Braga	3–1	Benfica	Braga
20:30	Luís Filipe 2', 84'; Zé Roberto 22'	Report	João Tomás 9'	Stadium: Estádio 1º de Maio; Attendance: 25,000; Referee: Lucílio Baptista

10 March 2001 24	Belenenses	1–0	Benfica	Lisbon
20:30	Marcão 50'	Report		Stadium: Estádio do Restelo; Attendance: 10,000; Referee: Olegário Benquerença

18 March 2001 25	Benfica	2–3	Paços de Ferreira	Lisbon
19:00	Carlitos 40'; Ednilson (red card) 63'; Roger 71'	Report	Rafael 26', 50'; Leonardo 34' Paulito (yellow card) 75' (yellow-red card) 89'	Stadium: Estádio da Luz; Attendance: 18,000; Referee: Paulo Paraty

31 March 2001 26	Campomaiorense	1–1	Benfica	Campo Maior, Portalegre
20:30	Paulo Vida 65'	Report	Roger (red card) 68'; Van Hooijdonk 85'; Kandaurov (red card) 87'	Stadium: Estádio Capitão Cesar Correia; Attendance: 5,000; Referee: João Ferreira

8 April 2001 27	Benfica	3–0	Maritimo	Lisbon
21:15	Ronaldo 27'; João Tomás 48'; Sabry 65'	Report		Stadium: Estádio da Luz; Attendance: 10,000; Referee: António Costa

13 April 2001 28	Farense	2–2	Benfica	Faro
21:30	Hassan 7'; Costa 67'	Report	Miguel 40'; João Tomás 42'	Stadium: Estádio de São Luís; Attendance: 7,000; Referee: Paulo Costa

22 April 2001 29	Benfica	1–0	Vitória Guimarães	Lisbon
19:00	Sabry 31'; Ricardo Esteves (yellow card) 20' (yellow-red card) 78'	Report		Stadium: Estádio da Luz; Attendance: 18,000; Referee: Duarte Gomes

29 April 2001 30	Sporting	3–0	Benfica	Lisbon
21:30	Acosta 2'; Pedro Barbosa 21'; Beto 57'	Report		Stadium: Estádio de Alvalade; Attendance: 27,000; Referee: João Ferreira

4 May 2001 31	Benfica	0–2	Alverca	Lisbon
19:00	Maniche (red card) 76'	Report	Dudić 17' (o.g.); Rui Borges 67'	Stadium: Estádio da Luz; Attendance: 7,000; Referee: Elmano Santos

13 May 2001 32	Gil Vicente	3–0	Benfica	Barcelos
20:30	Paulo César 13'; Alex Sandro (yellow card) 24' (yellow-red card) 45'; Sérgio Lomba 77'; Pinheiro 86'	Report	Miguel (red card) 25'	Stadium: Estádio Adelino Ribeiro Novo; Attendance: 3,500; Referee: Martins dos Santos

20 May 2001 33	Benfica	1–1	Salgueiros	Lisbon
20:00	Rui Baião 58'	Report	João Pedro 44'	Stadium: Estádio da Luz; Attendance: 12,000; Referee: Francisco Ferreira

27 May 2001 34	Desportivo Aves	4–4	Benfica	Vila das Aves
19:00	Douala 3', 23'; Abílio 19' (pen.); Marco Aleixo 77'	Report	Van Hooijdonk 30', 64'; João Tomás 35'; André 89'	Stadium: Estádio do CD das Aves; Attendance: 2,000; Referee: Lucílio Baptista

=== Taça de Portugal ===
26 November 2000 Fourth Rd	Campomaiorense	0–1	Benfica	Campo Maior
18:00 GMT	Cao (red card) 43'	Report	Sabry 76'	Stadium: Estádio Capitão Cesar Correia; Attendance: 5,000; Referee: Lucílio Baptista

3 January 2001 Fifth Rd	Louletano	1–3	Benfica	Loulé
19:00	Marcos Gaúcho 57'	Report	Van Hooijdonk 44', 48'; João Tomás 52'	Stadium: Estádio Municipal de Loulé; Attendance: 7,500; Referee: Bruno Paixão

17 January 2001 Sixth Rd	Benfica	1–1 (a.e.t.)	Porto	Lisbon
19:00	Maniche 53'; Escalona (yellow card) 73' (yellow-red card) 98'	Report	Marić 84'	Stadium: Estádio da Luz; Attendance: 43,000; Referee: José Pratas

23 January 2001 6R Replay	Porto	4–0	Benfica	Porto
19:15	Alenichev 10', 67' (pen.); Pena 28'; Paredes 34'	Report	Diogo Luís (yellow card) 36' (yellow-red card) 40'	Stadium: Estádio das Antas; Attendance: 16,500; Referee: Lucílio Baptista

=== UEFA Cup ===
==== First round ====
14 September 2000 First leg	Halmstad (Sweden)	2–1	(Portugal) Benfica	Halmstad
20:00	Svensson 35'; Selaković 57'	Report	Van Hooijdonk 40'	Stadium: Örjans Vall; Attendance: 3,796; Referee: Jacek Granat (Poland)

28 September 2000 Second leg	Benfica (Portugal)	2–2 (3–4 agg.)	(Sweden) Halmstad	Lisbon
20:00 GMT	van Hooijdonk 24'; Miguel 90'	Report	Gustafson 32'; Selaković 88'	Stadium: Estádio da Luz; Attendance: 20,000; Referee: Franz-Xaver Wack (Germany)

=== Friendlies ===
16 July 2000	Benfica	1–1	Adanaspor	Leogang, Austria
19:30	Maniche 26'	Report	Cenk İşler 54'	Stadium: Sportplatz

21 July 2000	Olympique Lyonnais	1–1	Benfica	Lyon, France
19:30	Kandaurov 36' (o.g.)	Report	Sabry 58'	Stadium: Stade de Gerland; Attendance: 48,000

26 July 2000	Barreirense	0–5	Benfica	Barreiro, Portugal
19:30		Report	Miguel 33', 51'; Pierre van Hooijdonk 34'; Kandaurov 45' (pen.); Carlitos 83'	Stadium: Estádio Dr. Manuel de Mello

29 July 2000	Benfica	0–1	Deportivo	Braga, Portugal
19:30		Report	Ronaldo (o.g.)	Stadium: Estádio Primeiro de Maio; Referee: Paulo Paraty

2 August 2000	Linfield	2–3	Benfica	Belfast, Northern Ireland
18:00	Davy Larmour 29', 49'	Report	Sabry 5', 26'; Carlitos 22'	Stadium: Windsor Park

5 August 2000	Liverpool	2–2	Benfica	Belfast, Northern Ireland
19:30	Camara 10'; Owen 47'	Report	Karel Poborský 64', 73'	Stadium: Windsor Park

8 August 2000	Académica	1–1	Benfica	Coimbra, Portugal
20:00	Dário 4'	Report	João Tomás 62'	Stadium: Municipal Coimbra; Referee: José Leirós

11 August 2000	Benfica	2–2	Aston Villa	Lisbon
20:00	Pierre van Hooijdonk 63'; Karel Poborský 84'	Report	Dublin 43'; Alan Thompson 86'	Stadium: Estádio da Luz; Attendance: 50,000; Referee: Lucilio Baptista

5 October 2000	Benfica	1–1	Marseille	Lisbon
	Pierre van Hooijdonk 75'	Report	Benjamin Gavanon 58'	Stadium: Estádio da Luz

10 January 2001	Benfica	1–1	CSKA Sofia	Lisbon
20:00	André 34'	Report	Antonov 84'	Stadium: Estádio da Luz; Attendance: 25,000; Referee: Luís Miranda

7 May 2001	Paris Saint-Germain	0–0 (3–4 p)	Benfica	Paris
20:00		Report		Stadium: Parc des Princes; Attendance: 35,000
	Penalties
	Benarbia (penalty missed); Mendy (penalty scored); Ducrocq (penalty scored); Robert (penalty scored); Vampeta (penalty missed)		(penalty missed) Kandaurov; (penalty scored) Paulo Madeira; (penalty scored) Chano; (penalty scored) Maniche; (penalty scored) Meira

31 May 2001	Atlas	0–1	Benfica	San Jose, California
20:00		Report	João Tomás 12'	Stadium: Spartan Stadium; Attendance: 15,000

3 June 2001	Benfica	4–2	Santa Clara	Boston
20:00	João Tomás 37', 76', 89'; André 67'	Report	Glaedson 6'; Sandro 81'	Stadium: Foxboro Stadium; Attendance: 20,000

== Player statistics ==
The squad for the season consisted of the players listed in the tables below, as well as staff members Heynckes (manager), Mourinho (manager), Toni (manager) and Mozer (assistant coach).

Note 1: Note: Flags indicate national team as defined under FIFA eligibility rules. Players may hold more than one non-FIFA nationality.

Note 2: Players with squad numbers marked ‡ joined the club during the 2000–01 season via transfer, with more details in the following section.

No.	Pos	Nat	Player	Total		Primeira Liga		Taça de Portugal		UEFA Cup	
No.	Pos	Nat	Player	Apps	Goals	Apps	Goals	Apps	Goals	Apps	Goals
1	GK	(Germany) GER	Robert Enke	32	-42	26	-32	4	-6	2	-4
2^{‡}	DF	(Federal Republic of Yugoslavia) YUG	Ivan Dudić	24	0	20	0	3	0	1	0
3^{‡}	DF	(Chile) CHI	Alejandro Escalona	11	0	9	0	2	0	0	0
4^{‡}	DF	(Spain) ESP	Carlos Marchena	23	2	20	2	3	0	0	0
5	DF	(Portugal) POR	Paulo Madeira	13	0	12	0	0	0	1	0
6^{‡}	DF	(Portugal) POR	Fernando Meira	37	0	31	0	4	0	2	0
7	MF	(Czech Republic) CZE	Karel Poborský	17	1	13	1	2	0	2	0
8	MF	(Spain) ESP	Chano	24	2	23	2	1	0	0	0
9^{‡}	FW	(Netherlands) NED	Pierre van Hooijdonk	35	23	30	19	3	2	2	2
10	MF	(Egypt) EGY	Abdel Sattar Sabry	29	4	24	3	3	1	2	0
11	FW	(Portugal) POR	João Tomás	36	18	31	17	3	1	2	0
12	GK	(Argentina) ARG	Carlos Bossio	8	-12	8	-12	0	0	0	0
13	DF	(Brazil) BRA	Ronaldo Guiaro	29	1	24	1	3	0	2	0
14	MF	(Chile) CHI	Cristián Uribe	5	0	4	0	0	0	1	0
15	DF	(Paraguay) PAR	Ricardo Rojas	12	0	9	0	1	0	2	0
16	DF	(Portugal) POR	Sérgio Nunes	5	0	3	0	1	0	1	0
17	MF	(Ukraine) UKR	Serhiy Kandaurov	8	0	7	0	0	0	1	0
18^{‡}	MF	(Portugal) POR	Carlitos	25	2	22	2	2	0	1	0
19	FW	(Cape Verde) CPV	Toy	5	0	4	0	1	0	0	0
20	MF	(Portugal) POR	Maniche	32	2	26	1	4	1	2	0
21^{‡}	MF	(Portugal) POR	Dani	5	0	5	0	0	0	0	0
22	MF	(Portugal) POR	José Calado	24	0	19	0	4	0	1	0
23^{‡}	DF	(Portugal) POR	Miguel Monteiro	26	2	23	1	2	0	1	1
24	GK	(Portugal) POR	José Moreira	0	0	0	0	0	0	0	0
25^{‡}	MF	(Brazil) BRA	Roger	13	2	12	2	1	0	0	0
26^{‡}	FW	(Equatorial Guinea) GEQ	André Neles	10	1	9	1	1	0	0	0
27	DF	(Portugal) POR	Ricardo Esteves	16	0	14	0	2	0	0	0
28	MF	(Portugal) POR	Rui Baião	6	1	6	1	0	0	0	0
29^{‡}	MF	(Portugal) POR	Ednilson	13	0	12	0	1	0	0	0
36	DF	(Portugal) POR	Diogo Luís	25	0	23	0	2	0	0	0
40	DF	(Portugal) POR	Nuno Abreu	1	0	0	0	1	0	0	0
57	DF	(Portugal) POR	Geraldo Alves	6	0	5	0	1	0	0	0

== Transfers ==
=== In ===
Entry date	Position	Player	From club	Fee	Ref
18 May 2000	RB	Ivan Dudić	Red Star	Undisclosed	
7 June 2000	CB	Carlos Marchena	Sevilla	Undisclosed	
16 June 2000	DM	Fernando Meira	Vitória de Guimarães	Undisclosed	
21 June 2000	RW	Carlitos	Real Madrid	Free	
22 June 2000	ST	Pierre van Hooijdonk	Vitesse Arnhem	Undisclosed	
26 June 2000	RW	Miguel Monteiro	Estrela da Amadora	Undisclosed	
12 July 2000	FB	Alejandro Escalona	Torino	Undisclosed	
14 September 2000	AM	Dani	Ajax	Undisclosed	
1 December 2000	LB	Ricardo Esteves	Alverca	Free	
13 December 2000	FW	André Neles	Atlético Mineiro	Undisclosed	
23 December 2000	FW	Roger	Fluminense	Undisclosed	
16 January 2001	DM	Ednilson	Roma	Undisclosed	

=== Out ===
Exit date	Position	Player	To club	Fee	Ref
1 June 2000	ST	Michael Thomas	Wimbledon	Free	
1 June 2000	RB	Samuel Okunowo	Barcelona	Loan end	
1 June 2000	FW	Tote	Real Madrid	Loan end	
4 June 2000	AM	João Pinto	Sporting	Free	
19 June 2000	LB	Bruno Basto	Bordeaux	Undisclosed	
23 June 2000	FW	Luís Carlos	Estrela da Amadora	Free	
26 June 2000	FW	Jorge Cadete	Estrela da Amadora	Free	
28 June 2000	DM	Amaral	Fiorentina	Undisclosed	
16 July 2000	ST	Nuno Gomes	Fiorentina	Undisclosed	
11 August 2000	LW	Hugo Porfírio	Marítimo	Free	
5 January 2001	RW	Karel Poborský	Lazio	Undisclosed	
27 January 2001	DM	Cristián Uribe	Huachipato	Loan end	

=== Out by loan ===
Date from	Position	Player	To club	Date to	Ref
31 May 2000	DM	Marco Freitas	Alverca	30 June 2001	
20 June 2001	LB	Jorge Ribeiro	Santa Clara	30 June 2001	
1 July 2000	CB	José Soares	Desportivo Aves	30 June 2001	
15 July 2000	DM	Luís Andrade	Braga	30 June 2001	
19 July 2000	GK	Nuno Santos	Badajoz	1 December 2000	
10 December 2000	GK	Nuno Santos	Santa Clara	30 June 2001	
30 January 2001	DM	Triantafyllos Machairidis	Kalamata	30 June 2001	
9 February 2001	FB	Ricardo Rojas	River Plate	30 December 2001	

== See also ==
- 2000–01 in Portuguese football
