= Alejandro Escalona =

Chilean footballer (born 1979)

Personal information
- Full name: Alejandro Adrián Escalona Martínez
- Date of birth: 14 August 1979 (age 47)
- Place of birth: Santiago, Chile
- Height: 1.82 m (6 ft 0 in)
- Position: Wing-back

Youth career
- 1995–1996: Colo-Colo

Senior career*
| Years | Team | Apps | (Gls) |
| 1997–1999 | Colo-Colo | 28 | (0) |
| 2000 | Torino | 3 | (0) |
| 2000–2001 | Benfica | 9 | (0) |
| 2001–2002 | River Plate | 1 | (0) |
| 2003–2007 | Everton | 40 | (1) |
| 2005–2006 | → Grêmio (loan) | 5 | (0) |
| 2007 | → Naútico (loan) | 0 | (0) |
| 2009–2010 | San Luis | 24 | (0) |
| 2011 | Everton | 10 | (0) |
| 2011 | San Luis | 15 | (1) |
| 2012 | Curicó Unido | 31 | (1) |
| Total | | 166 | (3) |

International career
| 1999 | Chile U20 | 9 | (0) |
- * Club domestic league appearances and goals

Alejandro Adrián Escalona Martínez, (born 14 August 1979) is a retired Chilean footballer who played as wing–back.

A youth international for Chile, Escalona played for Colo-Colo, Torino, Benfica, River Plate and Grêmio, but was mostly linked to Everton de Viña del Mar, representing them on three spells.

== Career ==
=== Early life ===
Born in Santiago, Escalona joined Colo-Colo in 1995, where he finish his youth development. He made his professional debut in 1997, in a single appearance, winning his first honour, the 1997 Torneo Clausura. The following season, he played 16 matches with one goal, adding another league title. He started 1999 at Colo-Colo, but after a receiving praise in the 1999 South American U-20 Championship, he moved to Torino. In Italy, he was unable to replicate his performances, and played only three games and saw the team being relegated.

=== Europe, Argentina and Brazil ===
In early July 2000, Escalona was set to join Napoli, but no agreement was reached with Torino. On the 12th, Benfica successfully signed with Escalona, with Cristián Uribe playing an important role in convincing the 21 year-old. He made his debut for Benfica in a friendly against Linfield on 3 August, during the Carlsberg Belfast Challenge. After the match, in an interview for the Portuguese media, he downplayed the fact that he was unknown in Portugal, saying: "I will show on the field what I am worth".

However, in a season that saw three managers pass through Benfica, Escalona could never gain his place, battling with the youngster Diogo Luís and the Paraguayan Rojas for the position and playing just nine league matches. In January 2001, his agent, Pablo Tallarico was involved in a fake Italian passports scandal, that included Uribe and Pablo Contreras. Initially, he denied knowledge of any wrongdoing, but in May, he had his passport seized by the Polícia Judiciária, and his contract with Benfica terminated.

On 30 July 2001, Escalona signed a one-year deal with River Plate, but played just one league game under Manuel Pellegrini. Released by River Plate, he returned to Chile in January 2003, joining Everton de Viña del Mar in the second tier. His good performances, which included a promotion to the top tier, helped secure a loan deal to Grêmio in March 2005. He helped Grêmio win the 2005 Série B and earn promotion back to the Série A, despite being sent-off in the crucial match, dubbed the Batalha dos Aflitos.

=== Late career ===
After his loan deal expired, Escalona joined Naútico in December 2006, but failed to impress, and was released just four months later. In July 2007, he re-signed with Everton for six months, playing 13 games in the 2007 season. After not competing in 2008, he moved to San Luis Quillota in 2009, where he helped them win promotion from the second tier in the first year and played 24 matches in the 2010 Primera División campaign that ended with relegation. In his last two seasons, he had a third spell at Everton, returned to San Luis Quillota and finished at Curicó Unido in 2012.

== Honors ==
=== Club ===
Colo-Colo

- Primera División de Chile (2): 1997 Clausura, 1998

River Plate

- Argentine Primera División (1): 2002 Clausura

Everton

- Primera B (1): 2003

Gremio

- Serie B (1): 2005
- Campeonato Gaúcho (1): 2006

San Luis

- Primera B (1): 2009 Clausura
