= Pepa (footballer) =

Portuguese footballer

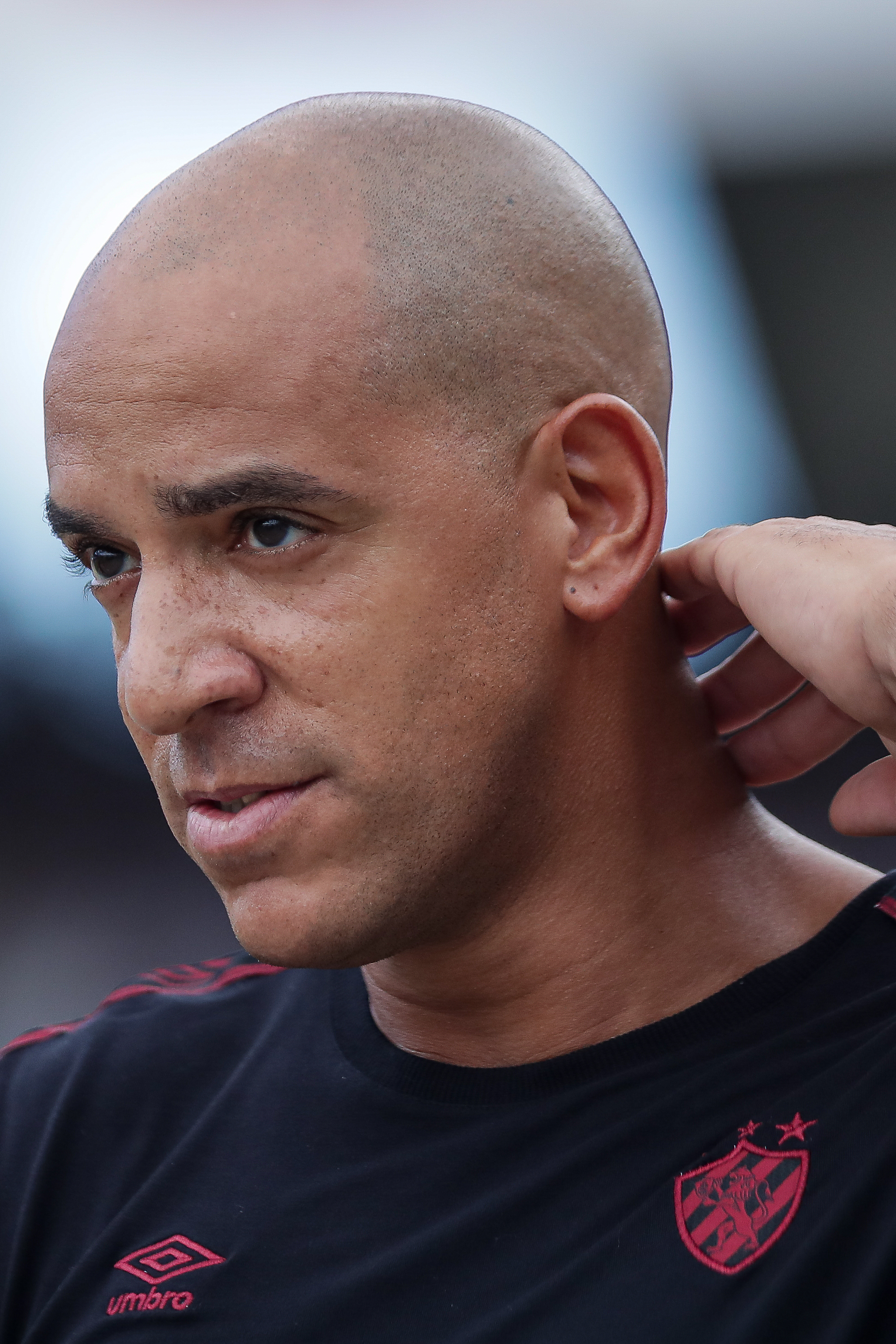
- Pepa in 2025

Personal information
- Full name: Pedro Miguel Marques da Costa Filipe
- Date of birth: 14 December 1980 (age 45)
- Place of birth: Torres Novas, Portugal
- Height: 1.86 m (6 ft 1 in)
- Position: Forward

Team information
- Current team: Estrela Amadora (manager)

Youth career
- 1991–1994: CADE
- 1994–1999: Benfica

Senior career*
Years	Team	Apps	(Gls)
1999–2002	Benfica	5	(1)
1999–2002	Benfica B	29	(1)
2000–2001	→ Lierse (loan)	14	(1)
2002–2003	Varzim	50	(10)
2004–2005	Paços Ferreira	1	(0)
2005–2006	Olhanense	12	(3)
Total		111	(16)

International career
1996	Portugal U15	8	(3)
1996	Portugal U16	2	(0)
1998	Portugal U17	3	(0)
1999	Portugal U18	9	(1)

Managerial career
- 2010–2011: Tondela (assistant)
- 2011–2013: Benfica (youth)
- 2013–2015: Sanjoanense
- 2015–2016: Feirense
- 2016: Moreirense
- 2017–2019: Tondela
- 2019–2021: Paços Ferreira
- 2021–2022: Vitória Guimarães
- 2022–2023: Al-Tai
- 2023: Cruzeiro
- 2023–2024: Al Ahli
- 2024–2025: Sport Recife
- 2026–: Estrela Amadora
- * Club domestic league appearances and goals

Pedro Miguel Marques da Costa Filipe (born 14 December 1980), known as Pepa, is a Portuguese football manager and former player who played as a forward. He is the head coach of Primeira Liga club Estrela da Amadora.

Developed at Benfica, where he made seven first-team appearances, he spent most of his career in his country's second tier, with 63 games and 13 goals for three clubs. He also played on loan at Lierse in the Belgian top flight, and earned 22 caps for Portugal at youth level.

Pepa began working as a manager in 2013, leading five Primeira Liga sides.

== Club career ==
Born in Torres Novas, Santarém District, Pepa joined S.L. Benfica's youth system in 1994, aged 13. He made his competitive debut with the main squad on 23 January 1999, scoring in a Primeira Liga 3–1 home win against Rio Ave FC. After being touted as an early promise, he went on to appear mainly for the reserve team, also being loaned in March 2000 to Lierse S.K. in Belgium for a fee of 50 million Portuguese escudos.

In 2002, Pepa terminated his contract with Benfica which had four years remaining, following in the footsteps of fellow youth graduates Rui Baião and Jorge Ribeiro and signing with Varzim SC, a decision he later claimed as the worst mistake in his life. He ended his career in late 2007 at only 26, due to several knee injuries.

== International career ==
Pepa represented Portugal at under-15, under-16, under-17 and under-18 levels. He helped the last of those age groups to win the UEFA European Championship in 1999.

== Coaching career ==
In summer 2013, after two years working with Benfica's youth sides, Pepa had his first head coaching experience, being appointed at A.D. Sanjoanense in the regional leagues and helping the club to promote to the third division at the first attempt. In 2015–16 he achieved the same feat with C.D. Feirense of the LigaPro, even though he did not finished the season after being replaced by José Mota for the final two months.

Pepa continued to work in the Portuguese top tier in the following years, with Moreirense F.C. and C.D. Tondela. During his two-year stint at the latter he successfully avoided relegation, but was not retained.

Having started the 2019–20 campaign without a club, Pepa replaced Filó at the helm of F.C. Paços de Ferreira after the fourth matchday, with the team last in the standings. In May 2021, after having led them to fifth place and qualification for the inaugural edition of the UEFA Europa Conference League, he left the Estádio da Mata Real.

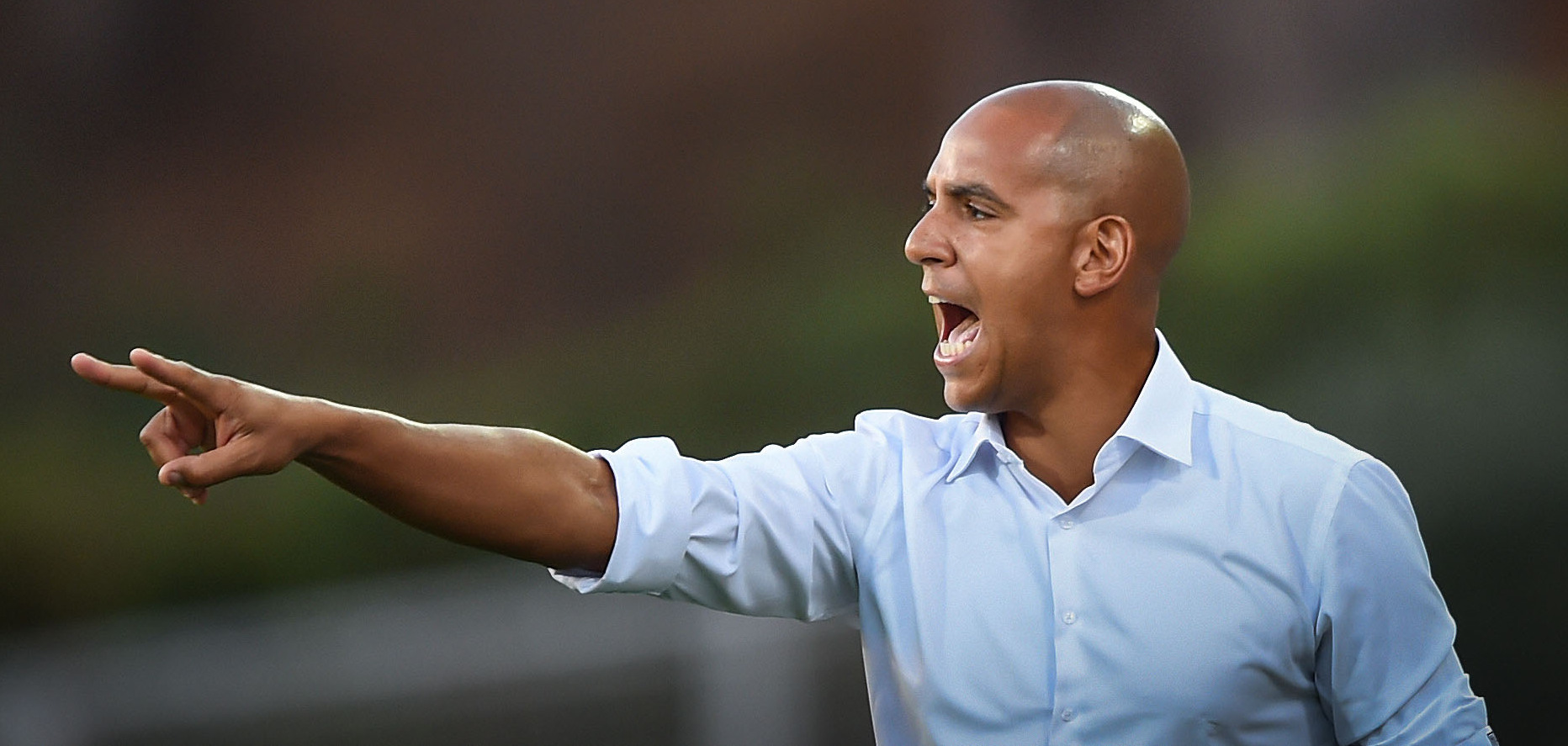
Pepa in charge of Vitória de Guimarães in 2021

Days after leaving Paços, Pepa signed a three-year contract to manage Vitória de Guimarães. He finished sixth in his only season, but he and his coaching staff were dismissed on 12 July 2022, days before the new campaign was due to open against Puskás Akadémia FC in the Conference League.

On 19 July 2022, Pepa was handed his first foreign management job, at Al-Tai FC in the Saudi Pro League. In January 2023, following a 1–0 defeat to Al Wehda FC, he was relieved of his duties.

Pepa switched countries again on 20 March 2023, after being announced as head coach of Campeonato Brasileiro Série A side Cruzeiro EC. He was sacked on 29 August due to poor results.

On 3 October 2023, Pepa was appointed as manager of Qatar Stars League club Al Ahli SC, on a one-year deal. He returned to Brazil in September of the following year, taking over Sport Club do Recife of Série B. He achieved top-tier promotion in his debut campaign, finishing in third place.

Pepa led his team to victory in the Campeonato Pernambucano on 2 April 2025, defeating Retrô Futebol Clube Brasil after a penalty shoot-out. On 3 May, however, he was dismissed, having failed to win a match at the start of the national league.

Pepa returned to Portugal in 2026–27, on a two-year contract at top-division C.F. Estrela da Amadora.

== Career statistics ==
Club	Season	League			Cup		Continental		Other		Total	
Club	Season	Division	Apps	Goals	Apps	Goals	Apps	Goals	Apps	Goals	Apps	Goals
Benfica	1998–99	Primeira Liga	2	1	0	0	—		—		2	1
Benfica	1999–2000	Primeira Liga	0	0	2	0	—		—		2	0
Benfica	2000–01	Primeira Liga	0	0	0	0	—		—		0	0
Benfica	2001–02	Primeira Liga	3	0	0	0	—		—		3	0
Benfica	Subtotal		5	1	2	0	—		—		7	1
Benfica B	1999–2000	Segunda Divisão	12	0	—		—		—		12	0
Benfica B	2000–01	Segunda Divisão	0	0	—		—		—		0	0
Benfica B	2001–02	Segunda Divisão	17	1	—		—		—		17	1
Benfica B	Subtotal		29	1	—		—		—		29	1
Lierse (loan)	2000–01	Belgian Pro League	14	1	—		—		—		14	1
Varzim	2002–03	Segunda Liga	29	5	1	0	—		—		30	5
Varzim	2003–04	Segunda Liga	21	5	1	1	—		—		22	6
Varzim	Subtotal		50	10	2	1	—		—		52	11
Paços de Ferreira	2004–05	Segunda Liga	1	0	—		—		—		1	0
Olhanense	2005–06	Liga de Honra	11	3	2	0	—		—		13	3
Olhanense	2006–07	Liga de Honra	1	0	—		—		—		1	0
Olhanense	Subtotal		12	3	2	0	—		—		14	3
Career total			111	16	6	1	0	0	0	0	117	17

== Managerial statistics ==
As of match played 22 November 2026

Managerial record by team and tenure
Team	Nat	From	To	Record							
Team	Nat	From	To	G	W	D	L	GF	GA	GD	Win %
Sanjoanense	(Portugal)	28 June 2013	25 May 2015	71	40	16	15	122	68	+54	56.34
Feirense	(Portugal)	1 July 2015	24 March 2016	46	22	13	11	53	39	+14	47.83
Moreirense	(Portugal)	20 May 2016	21 November 2016	12	3	2	7	9	15	−6	25.00
Tondela	(Portugal)	10 January 2017	24 May 2019	95	29	22	44	116	140	−24	30.53
Paços Ferreira	(Portugal)	2 September 2019	19 May 2021	74	31	14	29	90	98	−8	41.89
Vitória Guimarães	(Portugal)	21 May 2021	12 July 2022	40	17	10	13	63	48	+15	42.50
Al-Tai	(Saudi Arabia)	19 July 2022	22 January 2023	15	6	1	8	20	22	−2	40.00
Cruzeiro	(Brazil)	20 March 2023	29 August 2023	25	7	8	10	23	23	+0	28.00
Al Ahli	(Qatar)	3 October 2023	8 April 2024	20	9	3	8	42	37	+5	45.00
Sport Recife	(Brazil)	3 September 2024	3 May 2025	42	21	7	14	68	39	+29	50.00
Estrela Amadora	(Portugal)	12 June 2026	Present	13	4	4	5	20	23	−3	30.77
Total				453	189	100	164	626	552	+74	41.72

== Honours ==
=== Manager ===
Sport Recife

- Campeonato Pernambucano: 2025
