= João Mawete =

Angolan footballer (born 1981)

Personal information
- Full name: João Batista Mawete
- Date of birth: 25 January 1981 (age 45)
- Place of birth: Luanda, Angola
- Height: 1.78 m (5 ft 10 in)
- Position: Striker

Youth career
- 1990−1993: La Storta
- 1993−1994: Recreativo Massamá
- 1994−2000: Benfica

Senior career*
Years	Team	Apps	(Gls)
1999–2005	Benfica B	51	(12)
1999–2001	Benfica	7	(2)
2002	→ S.C. Braga (loan)	7	(0)
2005–2006	Olivais e Moscavide	6	(0)
2006–2007	Walsall	0	(0)
2007–2008	Verbroedering Geel	9	(0)
2008–2009	Chalkanoras Idaliou	18	(1)
2009–2010	Hamrun Spartans	13	(4)
2010	Cabinda	0	(0)
2010–2011	Dingli Swallows	0	(0)
Total		111	(19)
- * Club domestic league appearances and goals

João Batista Mawete (born 4 May 1983) is an Angolan former footballer who played as a striker.

Mawete began his professional football career with Portuguese Liga side Benfica, and spent several seasons with the club's reserve team, making only seven league appearances for the first team.

== Career ==
Born in Luanda, Mawete is the son of Mawete João Baptista, an ambassador for Angola. When his father was the Angolan ambassador in Rome, he joined him there and started playing football at La Storta, alongside his brother, Ludi. Despite compelling performances in youth tournaments, in 1993, Mawete moved to Lisbon to continue his education. He joined Recreativo Massamá, where he caught the attention of Benfica, who signed him in the following year. At Benfica he won the under–17 and under–19 championships, breaking an 11-year drought in the latter.

Mawete joined the first team in August 1999, and made his professional debut on 12 September, against Santa Clara. He added three more appearances for the first team in 1999–2000, before returning to the reserve team in December. In October 2000, the 19-year old extended his contract with Benfica until 2005, but only returned to the first team a year later, in October 2001. On the 13th, Mawete scored his first goal for the main team, in a 1–1 draw against União de Leiria. A week later, he opened the score in a 2–0 win against Gil Vicente. He played 8 games in half-season for Benfica, before being loaned out to Braga in January 2002, in a deal involving Tiago Mendes and Armando Sá.

In his spell in Braga, he made just seven appearances, without scoring and in July 2002, he suffered a debilitating injury that would stall his career. He rupture his tendons, almost one after another and was out for 18 months, as he described: "My injuries to the tendons changed my life as footballer for ever. I ruptured them both, one after the other, something that sideline me for one and half years. With such a serious injury like this one, clubs became afraid of hiring me, with the fear that some tendon would rupture again, so I sit forgotten in Benfica B". In June 2004, he went on trial to Wycombe Wanderers but did not stay. In April 2005, he terminated his contract with Benfica and joined Olivais e Moscavide, where he won the 2005–06 Segunda Divisão. In the following years, Mawete passed through three other clubs, only regaining some notability at Hamrun Spartans in Malta with 4 four goals in thirteen appearances. He returned to Angola in 2010 for personal reasons and ended his career in the next season at age 30. After football, he started managing hotel, pig farming and fish farming businesses.
