= André Neles =

Equatoguinean footballer (1978–2020)

Personal information
- Full name: André Moreira Neles
- Date of birth: 4 January 1978
- Place of birth: Patrocínio (MG), Brazil
- Date of death: 6 February 2020 (aged 42)
- Place of death: Uberlândia (MG), Brazil
- Height: 1.80 m (5 ft 11 in)
- Position: Striker

Youth career
- 1996–1997: Uberlândia
- 1998: Anápolis
- 1998–1999: Villa Nova

Senior career*
Years	Team	Apps	(Gls)
1999–2000	Atlético Mineiro	12	(3)
2000–2004	Benfica	9	(1)
2001	→ Marítimo (loan)	12	(2)
2002	→ Vitória (loan)	20	(10)
2003	→ Internacional (loan)	5	(3)
2003	→ Palmeiras (loan)	5	(1)
2004	Marítimo	5	(0)
2004	Atlético Mineiro	1	(0)
2004	Figueirense	5	(1)
2005–2007	Fortaleza	1	(0)
2006–2007	→ Al-Ettifaq (loan)	11	(8)
2007	→ Ipatinga (loan)	3	(0)
2008–2009	Grêmio Barueri	1	(0)
2009	→ Botafogo-SP (loan)	10	(4)
2009	→ Ceará (loan)	2	(0)
2010	Botafogo-SP	22	(5)
2010	→ Oeste (loan)	3	(1)
2010	→ Icasa (loan)	11	(4)
2011	América-RN	9	(2)
2012	Marcílio Dias	5	(0)
2012	Uberlândia	8	(1)
2012	Icasa	5	(0)
2013	São Carlos	11	(1)
2014	CEOV		
2015	Rio Branco-SP		

International career^{‡}
2007–2011	Equatorial Guinea	6	(3)
- * Club domestic league appearances and goals as of 24 October 2015 ‡ National team caps and goals as of 24 October 2015

André Moreira Neles (4 January 1978 – 6 February 2020), known as André Neles, was a professional footballer who played as a striker. His last club was Alecrim FC.

He started at Uberlândia, but only gained recognition at Atlético Mineiro. After compelling performances, he signed with Benfica in 2000, but could never break into the starting eleven, spending the following four years on multiple loan deals, which included Vitória, Internacional and Palmeiras. In 2004, he signed with Marítimo but only stayed there for a few months, moving from club to club on almost a yearly basis, mainly in the Brazilian lower divisions. Born and raised in Brazil, he was granted Equatorial Guinea nationality in 2007 and won 3 international caps for his national team between 2007 and 2011.

== Club career ==
=== Early career and Benfica ===
Born in Patrocínio in the Brazilian state of Minas Gerais, Neles started at Uberlândia in 1996 and spent there two seasons. In 1998, he moved to Anápolis for a brief stint, before joining Villa Nova, where he attracted the attention of Atlético Mineiro, who signed him in early 1999. He made his debut on 18 July 1999 against a team from Itaúna and after displaying good performances in the Campeonato Mineiro, he gained recognition amongst the fans. On 11 May 2000, in the Round of 16 of the 2000 Copa Libertadores, Neles created a crucial goal for Marques, that allow Atlético Mineiro to take the game to penalty kicks. In December 2000, he signed with Benfica for a transfer fee reported by Record to be €2.5M for just half of his economic rights. He made his debut in a friendly match against CSKA Sofia on 10 January 2001, scoring the opening goal in a 1–1 draw. However, in competitive matches, Neles was only a reserve player and he struggled with the lack of playing time. With stiff competition from Pierre van Hooijdonk and João Tomás, he netted just once in nine appearances.

In July 2001, Neles was sent on his first loan at Benfica, joining Marítimo for one year. He commented his dismissal by Toni saying: "I think I did not have a real opportunity at Benfica. Not even a league match in the starting line-up; only as an option from the bench. From the start of a game, only in friendlies. Of course it is difficult to perform like this." He also confess that he chose Marítimo because they had qualified for the UEFA Cup, refusing offers from Atlético Paranaense, Internacional and Portuguesa de Desportos. His spell there was only mildly successful, with two goals in 12 matches; a winner against Boavista on 10 December and an equalizer against Varzim on 23 December. In January 2002, André returned to Benfica and went on a second loan deal, now in Brazil, at Vitória.

There he won the Campeonato Baiano and scored 31 goals in all competitions, 10 of them in the Série A, which included a decisive goal against Palmeiras on 17 November, that guaranteed their relegation. In early 2003, he was sent on a third loan deal, joining Internacional until December. From his previous loan he acknowledged that returning to Brazil was good for him; he matured significantly and was hopeful of returning to Benfica. He started well at Internacional, with three goals in five appearances in the Brasileirão, but shortly after, a knee injury broke his momentum. Only a few months after joining Internacional, he moved to Palmeiras, at the time playing in the second tier. His spell there was unsuccessful, as he scored only one time, on 9 August against Portuguesa, and spent most of the time as back-up due to 19-year-old, Vágner Love.

=== Post-Benfica ===
In January 2004, Neles ended his connection with Benfica and signed with Marítimo for 1 1/2 seasons. However, problems outside football led to his quick departure. In June, he was back to Brazil, playing for Atlético Mineiro in the Série A. In mid-2004, he changed teams for a third time in the year, signing with Figueirense, scoring one goal in five matches. In 2005, he joined Fortaleza and played only once for them, spending a year in the Saudi Premier League with Ettifaq FC, and having a two-month stint with Ipatinga. In 2008, Neles moved to Grêmio Barueri, where he played just one league game for them, before going on subsequent loans to Botafogo-SP and Ceará. He would return to Botafogo-SP in 2010, playing in the Campeonato Paulista do Interior and being the team top scorer with five goals and winning the league. In the same season, he would play for Oeste in the Série D and for Icasa in the Série B. In February 2011, the 33-year-old signed with América-RN and had good performances in the state league, remaining with América for the entire season.

In December 2011, he signed with Marcílio Dias in the Campeonato Catarinense, but only two months later, he returned to his childhood club, Uberlândia. In August, he had a second spell at Icasa, now competing in the Série C. Neles signed with São Carlos Futebol Clube in January 2013, playing for them in the second tier of the Campeonato Paulista. In 2014, he played at CEOV, helping them to a runner-up finish in the Campeonato Mato-Grossense and in May 2015, joined Rio Branco in the Campeonato Paulista Série A2.

== International career ==
In 2007, Neles was offered two-hundred thousand dollars, plus an additional ten thousand per game, to change passport and represent Equatorial Guinea. Although he had a great-grandmother of African descent, he accepted to play for Equatorial Guinea because of the money offered by the Equatoguinean Football Federation. He made his debut in 2007 and according to him, played in 10 games and scored four goals. Two of those games were for the 2010 FIFA World Cup qualification. In February 2011, he returned to the national team after 2 1/2 years of international absence, for a friendly match against Chad.

=== International goals ===
#	Date	Venue	Opponent	Score	Result	Competition
1	25 March 2007	Estadio Internacional, Malabo, Equatorial Guinea	Rwanda	1 – 0	3 - 1	Africa Cup of Nations 2008 Qualifying

== Honours ==
Atlético Mineiro

- Campeonato Mineiro: 2000

Vitória

- Campeonato Baiano: 2002

Fortaleza

- Campeonato Cearense: 2005

Grémio Barueri

- Campeonato do Interior: 2008

Botafogo-SP

- Campeonato do Interior: 2010

== Personal life ==
Neles' younger brother, Átila Neles, is also a footballer – and a forward. He too spent most of his professional career in Brazil, where he played for Uberlândia.

He confessed to drug use during his time at Palmeiras. His flamboyant lifestyle earn him the nickname, "André Balada". Since then, he entered the Presbyterian faith to overcome his problems. In his incursion in the religion, André Neles recorded a disc of gospel music, sung by himself. Neles died of a heart attack on 6 February 2020, aged 42, at his home in Uberlândia.
