= 2009 Torneo Clausura (Primera B de Chile) =

Primera B de Chile
- Season: 2009 Primera B
- Champions: Unión San Felipe

The 2009 Torneo Clausura was part of the 59th completed season of the Primera B de Chile.

San Luis de Quillota was tournament's champion.

== League table ==
Pos	Team	Pld	W	D	L	GF	GA	GD	Pts
1	San Luis de Quillota	19	11	6	2	24	12	+12	39
2	Santiago Wanderers	19	10	8	1	29	12	+17	38
3	Unión San Felipe	19	11	4	4	33	15	+18	37
4	Deportes Antofagasta	19	8	4	7	25	30	−5	28
5	Deportes Concepción	19	7	5	7	29	22	+7	26
6	San Marcos de Arica	19	6	8	5	29	30	−1	26
7	Coquimbo Unido	19	6	7	6	28	31	−3	25
8	Provincial Osorno	19	6	6	7	35	32	+3	24
9	Deportes Puerto Montt	19	5	6	8	22	24	−2	21
10	Naval	19	4	9	6	16	26	−10	21
11	Unión La Calera	19	3	8	8	19	29	−10	17
12	Deportes Melipilla	19	8	4	7	35	30	+5	13 (Note: 15 points deducted)
13	Deportes Copiapó	19	3	4	12	15	30	−15	13
14	Lota Schwager	19	3	5	11	18	31	−13	8 (Note: 6 points deducted)
