= Nuno Abreu =

Portuguese footballer (born 1975)

Personal information
- Full name: Nuno Tiago Lourenço Santos Abreu
- Date of birth: 22 October 1975 (age 51)
- Place of birth: Lisbon, Portugal
- Height: 1.88 m (6 ft 2 in)
- Position: Centre-back

Youth career
- 1989–1991: Carcavelos
- 1991–1993: Estoril

Senior career*
Years	Team	Apps	(Gls)
1993–1996	Estoril	7	(0)
1996–1997	Atlético CP	18	(0)
1997–1998	Machico	31	(4)
1998–1999	Portimonense	26	(2)
1999–2000	Benfica B	48	(3)
1999–2001	Benfica	0	(0)
2000–2001	→ Felgueiras (loan)	16	(0)
2002	Oliveirense	10	(1)
2002–2004	Micaelense	65	(4)
2004–2005	Pinhalnovense	34	(6)
2005–2007	Olivais Moscavide	53	(4)
2007–2008	Mafra	35	(2)
2008–2009	Louletano	30	(3)
2009–2011	Atlético Reguengos	56	(2)
2011–2013	Oeiras	60	(0)
2013–2014	Pêro Pinheiro	28	(5)
2014–2015	Cova da Piedade	20	(0)
2015–2017	Carcavelos		
- * Club domestic league appearances and goals

Nuno Tiago Lourenço Santos Abreu (born 22 October 1975) is a Portuguese footballer who plays for Carcavelos mainly as a centre-back.

== Career ==
Born in Lisbon, Abreu began at Carcavelos at age 14, playing two seasons for their under–17 team before, moving for Estoril. He made his professional debut for them on 22 May 1994, in a Primeira Liga match against Vitória de Guimarães, and added two more appearances in the remainder of the season. At 21-years, Abreu left Estoril and joined Atlético CP on the third tier, a move he would follow in the following two seasons, first signing with Machico and then with Portimonense.

On 13 August 1999, Abreu joined Benfica B. He was call-up by Jupp Heynckes for the first team match against Sporting on 6 May 2000, but did not play. In October 2000, he alongside, Diogo Luís and Geraldo Alves extended their contract with Benfica until 2004.

In December, Abreu was loaned out to Felgueiras until the end of the season. He played his first game for Felgueiras in a home loss to Porto, and he was directly involved in injuries to two Porto players, Pena and Drulovic. The first required 15 stitches to his right hand and the latter lost two teeth and was knocked-out. He received criticism from Porto president, Pinto da Costa, to which he defended himself, describing the events: "The clash with Pena, was in my opinion, casual and without intent. I think everybody saw it. I am not the blame he got injured, it could happen to me. About Drulovic, I honestly do not remember anything and besides, it is irrelevant because it is thing that happen all the time in football."

Abreu returned to Benfica in June, but found himself back to the B-team and with an offer to terminate his contract and become a free player. In December, after six-months without competing, he accepted an early termination and signed with Oliveirense. He then began a career in the lower leagues, mainly the second and third tier, representing nine other clubs, before returning to Carcavelos in July 2015, for his final year.
