= Rui Borges (footballer, born 1973) =

Portuguese footballer

Personal information
- Full name: Rui Fernando Nascimento Borges
- Date of birth: 14 December 1973 (age 52)
- Place of birth: Lisbon, Portugal
- Height: 1.66 m (5 ft 5 in)
- Position: Attacking midfielder

Youth career
- 1984–1988: Estrela da Amadora
- 1988–1989: Futebol Benfica
- 1989–1990: Damaiense
- 1990–1992: Casa Pia

Senior career*
Years	Team	Apps	(Gls)
1992–1995	Casa Pia	28	(3)
1995–1996	Boavista	10	(1)
1996–1997	Académico de Viseu	28	(2)
1997–1998	C.F. União de Lamas	29	(5)
1998–2002	Alverca	119	(13)
2002–2004	Belenenses	39	(1)
2004–2007	Estrela da Amadora	68	(6)
2007–2009	Trofense	36	(3)
2009–2010	Vizela	4	(0)
Total		361	(34)

Managerial career
- 2011–2012: Vizela (assistant)
- 2012–2013: Boavista (assistant)
- * Club domestic league appearances and goals

Rui Fernando Nascimento Borges (born 14 December 1973) is a Portuguese retired professional footballer who played as an attacking midfielder.

== Playing career ==
Borges was born in Lisbon. During his extensive professional career he represented Casa Pia, Boavista (where he made his Primeira Liga debut), Académico de Viseu, C.F. União de Lamas, Alverca, Belenenses, Estrela da Amadora, Trofense – contributing with 26 games and two goals to their first ever top-flight promotion in 2008 – and Vizela.

Over ten seasons, Borges amassed Portuguese top division totals of 221 matches and 18 goals, mainly for Alverca where he spent four years.

== Coaching career ==
Borges began his coaching career at Vizela in July 2011, as assistant to Quim Berto. In October 2012, he moved to another former employer Boavista, to assist new player-manager Petit.
