= Ricardo Rojas (footballer, born 1971) =

Paraguayan footballer

Personal information
- Full name: Ricardo Ismael Rojas Mendoza
- Date of birth: 26 January 1971 (age 55)
- Place of birth: Posadas, Argentina
- Height: 1.76 m (5 ft 9 in)
- Position: Full-back

Youth career
- 1991: Argentinos Juniors

Senior career*
Years	Team	Apps	(Gls)
1991–1992	Cerro Corá	15	(0)
1992–1994	Libertad	54	(0)
1994–1999	Estudiantes	123	(0)
1999–2001	Benfica	32	(0)
2001	→ River Plate (loan)	24	(1)
2002–2006	River Plate	44	(0)
2006–2007	Belgrano	10	(0)
Total		302	(1)

International career
1997–1998	Paraguay	7	(0)
- * Club domestic league appearances and goals

Ricardo Ismael Rojas Mendoza (born 26 January 1971) is a retired Paraguayan professional footballer who played as a full-back.

He first came into notability at Libertad in Paraguay, transferring to Estudiantes in 1995, where he established himself and received his first call-up for Paraguay national team. In 1999, he moved to Benfica, but less than a year and half later was back at Argentina, playing for River Plate until 2006. He represented Paraguay seven times, being a participant at the 1998 FIFA World Cup.

== Club career ==
Born in Posadas, at the Argentine province of Misiones, Rojas played for Argentinos Juniors at the same time as Christian Dollberg in 1991. He moved to Cerro Corá in the same year and participated in their campaign in the Primera División. In 1992, he joined the larger Club Libertad, where he secured a place in the first team, amassing over 50 league matches in three seasons. After five years in Paraguay, Rojas returned to Argentina, signing with Estudiantes.

In Estudiantes, he played the left-back role for four seasons with more than 120 league appearances, but without winning any silverware. In July 1999, the 28-year-old moved abroad and joined Benfica, alongside his teammate, Carlos Bossio;in what he labelled the transfer as the highest point in his career. According to Record, the fee for both was three million dollars. He made his debut on 12 September, in a 3–0 away win against Santa Clara, and went on to play 30 games in all competitions, mainly as a right-back. However, in 2000–01, the signings of Ivan Dudić on the right, and the breakthrough of Diogo Luís on the left, severely diminished his playing time, so in February 2001, he was loaned to River Plate. His pay-check there was a reported 500 thousand dollars, one of highest in the league.

Initially, under Américo Gallego, he could only play in the Copa Libertadores due to his late arrival in the season. In 2001–02, already with Ramón Díaz in charge, Rojas alternated with Matías Lequi on the left and despite speculation that he would be released, he signed on permanent deal in early 2002. On 11 March 2002, he scored his only top tier goal, in a 3–0 victory of River over its main rivals, Boca Juniors. After scoring that goal, he was nicknamed vaseline. He would play for River for a further four years, retiring in 2007 after a brief spell at Belgrano. After football, he became a farmer and moved back to his home-town.

== International career ==
Despite being born in Argentina, Rojas grandparents were from Paraguay. He hoped of playing for Argentina but the stiff competition made it difficult for him to ever receive a call-up, so he opted to represent Paraguay instead, as he explained in 1999: "My grandparents were Paraguayans and before I played in Argentina, I had already received a call-up to play for Paraguay. Still, I turned it down because my ambition was to play for the Argentina national team, but I soon figured out my chances were slim. Just before the World Cup in France, I was invited again by the Paraguayan Football Association and ended up accepting it and representing Paraguay in the World Cup." He was listed in squad for the 1997 Copa América, and was a participant at the 1998 FIFA World Cup, but did not make any appearances. In total, he received 7 call-ups from 1997 to 1998.
