= Carlitos (footballer, born 1977) =

Portuguese footballer

Personal information
- Full name: Carlos Manuel da Silva Cunha
- Date of birth: 6 March 1977 (age 49)
- Place of birth: Barcelos, Portugal
- Height: 1.68 m (5 ft 6 in)
- Position: Winger

Youth career
- 1998–1995: Gil Vicente

Senior career*
Years	Team	Apps	(Gls)
1995–1997	Gil Vicente	60	(10)
1997–2000	Real Madrid	0	(0)
1997–1998	→ Braga (loan)	16	(2)
1998–1999	→ Estrela Amadora (loan)	11	(0)
1999–2000	→ Gil Vicente (loan)	30	(6)
2000–2003	Benfica	46	(5)
2001	Benfica B	3	(0)
2004	Poli Ejido	7	(0)
2004–2006	Gil Vicente	61	(8)
2007	Belenenses	8	(0)
2007–2010	Vitória Guimarães	38	(0)
2010–2011	Gil Vicente	16	(0)
Total		296	(31)

International career
1996–1997	Portugal U20	11	(6)
1998–2000	Portugal U21	15	(4)
2000	Portugal B	2	(0)
- * Club domestic league appearances and goals

Carlos Manuel da Silva Cunha (born 6 March 1977), known as Carlitos, is a Portuguese former professional footballer who played as a right winger.

He amassed Primeira Liga totals of 260 matches and 30 goals over 16 seasons, mainly with Gil Vicente (six years). He also spent significant time in the competition with Benfica (four seasons) and Vitória de Guimarães (three).

== Club career ==
Born in Barcelos, Carlitos' career was intimately connected with local Gil Vicente FC, which he represented in four separate spells. He made his first-team – and Primeira Liga – debut late into 1994–95 at the age of 18, then proceeded to total a further 58 league appearances in two full seasons.

In 1997, Carlitos joined Real Madrid on a four-year contract, being successively loaned to S.C. Braga, C.F. Estrela da Amadora and Gil Vicente again and never appearing in competitive games for the Spaniards. In the latter campaign, he scored a career-best nine goals as the latter club finished in a best-ever fifth position; his teammates included future Portugal international Petit.

Carlitos then signed with league giants S.L. Benfica, but could never really settle in the starting XI, also being demoted at one point to the reserves. From February 2004 he played for six months in Spain with Polideportivo Ejido, teaming up with his former Benfica mate José Calado. He returned to his country and Gil shortly after, spending parts of his last season in the Segunda Liga and finishing it again in the top tier, with C.F. Os Belenenses.

For 2007–08, Carlitos joined Vitória S.C. upon the Minho side's return to the top flight. He would only be used regularly in the first year – 22 matches, 11 from the bench – helping to a final third position, but gradually lost his importance in the team. In July 2010 he returned to Gil Vicente, aged 33, appearing in 16 games as the club promoted to the top division and retiring shortly after.

== Honours ==
Gil Vicente

- Segunda Liga: 2010–11
