= 2000–01 in Portuguese football =

The 2000–01 Primeira Liga was the 67th edition of the top flight of Portuguese soccer. It started on 19 August 2000 and ended on 27 May 2001. Boavista won their first league title, becoming only the second club outside the traditional "Big Three" (Benfica, Porto, Sporting CP) to win the championship. Three teams were promoted from the Segunda Liga: Paços de Ferreira, Beira-Mar, and Desportivo das Aves. They replaced Vitória de Setúbal, Rio Ave, and Santa Clara, who were relegated after the 1999–2000 season.

== Teams ==
The following 18 teams competed in the Primeira Liga during the 2000–01 season:

- Alverca
- Beira-Mar
- Belenenses
- Benfica
- Boavista
- Braga
- Campomaiorense
- Desportivo das Aves
- Estrela da Amadora
- Farense
- Gil Vicente
- Marítimo
- Paços de Ferreira
- Porto
- Salgueiros
- Sporting CP
- União de Leiria
- Vitória de Guimarães

== League table ==
Pos	Team	Pld	W	D	L	GF	GA	GD	Pts
1	Boavista	34	23	7	4	63	22	+41	76
2	Porto	34	22	8	4	74	28	+46	74
3	Sporting CP	34	20	8	6	65	30	+35	68
4	Marítimo	34	15	10	9	45	38	+7	55
5	Vitória de Guimarães	34	15	9	10	48	40	+8	54
6	União de Leiria	34	14	10	10	46	39	+7	52
7	Braga	34	13	11	10	42	37	+5	50
8	Gil Vicente	34	13	9	12	41	43	−2	48
9	Benfica	34	12	11	11	44	39	+5	47
10	Belenenses	34	11	10	13	38	42	−4	43
11	Salgueiros	34	10	11	13	36	45	−9	41
12	Farense	34	10	10	14	33	47	−14	40
13	Paços de Ferreira	34	9	11	14	34	46	−12	38
14	Beira-Mar	34	9	10	15	32	48	−16	37
15	Alverca	34	9	9	16	30	50	−20	36
16	Estrela da Amadora	34	8	11	15	29	49	−20	35
17	Desportivo das Aves	34	7	10	17	28	55	−27	31
18	Campomaiorense	34	6	9	19	27	58	−31	27

== Top scorers ==
Rank	Player	Club	Goals
1	Pena	Porto	22
2	Pierre van Hooijdonk	Benfica	20
3	Rafael	Paços de Ferreira	17
4	João Tomás	Benfica	16
4	Hassan Nader	Farense	16
6	Alberto Acosta	Sporting CP	14
6	Miklós Fehér	Braga	14
8	Derlei	União de Leiria	13
8	Marcão	Belenenses	13
10	Edmilson	Braga	11
10	Elpídio Silva	Boavista	11
10	Gaúcho	Estrela da Amadora	11

== Goalkeeper stats ==
Player	Club	Clean sheets	Matches played
Ricardo	Boavista	17	34
Vítor Baía	Porto	15	33
Peter Schmeichel	Sporting CP	14	32
Nuno Santos	Sporting CP	12	28
Marco Tábuas	Paços de Ferreira	11	31
Paulo Santos	Braga	10	30
Jorge Baptista	Gil Vicente	9	29
Moretto	Salgueiros	8	28
Rui Correia	Benfica	8	27

== Stadiums and locations ==
Club	Stadium	City	Capacity
Alverca	Complexo Desportivo de Alverca	Alverca do Ribatejo	5,000
Beira-Mar	Estádio Mário Duarte	Aveiro	12,000
Belenenses	Estádio do Restelo	Lisbon	30,000
Benfica	Estádio da Luz	Lisbon	52,000
Boavista	Estádio do Bessa	Porto	28,000
Braga	Estádio Primeiro de Maio	Braga	28,800
Campomaiorense	Estádio Capitão César Correia	Campo Maior	8,000
Desportivo das Aves	Estádio do Clube Desportivo das Aves	Vila das Aves	5,000
Estrela da Amadora	Estádio José Gomes	Amadora	15,000
Farense	Estádio de São Luís	Faro	12,000
Gil Vicente	Estádio Adelino Ribeiro Novo	Barcelos	12,000
Marítimo	Estádio dos Barreiros	Funchal (Madeira)	10,600
Paços de Ferreira	Estádio da Mata Real	Paços de Ferreira	5,250
Porto	Estádio das Antas	Porto	48,000
Salgueiros	Estádio Engenheiro Vidal Pinheiro	Porto	11,000
Sporting CP	Estádio José Alvalade (old)	Lisbon	52,000
União de Leiria	Estádio Dr. Magalhães Pessoa	Leiria	23,000
Vitória de Guimarães	Estádio D. Afonso Henriques	Guimarães	30,000

== Awards ==
- Player of the Season: Ricardo (Boavista)
- Manager of the Season: Jaime Pacheco (Boavista)
- Young Player of the Season: Hugo Viana (Sporting CP)
- Top Scorer: Pena (Porto) – 22 goals
- Goalkeeper of the Season: Ricardo (Boavista) – 17 clean sheets
- Breakthrough Player: Derlei (União de Leiria)

== Notable matches and events ==
- Boavista 3–0 Sporting CP (Round 1): A dominant season opener that signaled Boavista's title ambitions.
- Porto 6–0 Alverca (30 October 2000): The biggest home win of the season.
- Campomaiorense 0–5 Porto (18 September 2000): The biggest away win of the season.
- Braga 3–5 União de Leiria (27 May 2001): Highest-scoring match of the season, played on the final day.
- Benfica 2–2 Sporting CP (Lisbon Derby, Round 28): A thrilling draw that dented Sporting's title hopes.
- Boavista clinches title (Round 33): Boavista secured the championship with a 3–1 win over Desportivo das Aves.
- Benfica finishes 6th: Marked the club's lowest-ever finish in Primeira Liga history.
- Relegation drama: Campomaiorense, Desportivo das Aves, and Estrela da Amadora were relegated after a tense final month.

== Promotion and relegation ==
At the end of the 1999–2000 season, the following teams were relegated from the Primeira Liga to the Segunda Liga:

- Vitória de Setúbal
- Rio Ave
- Santa Clara

They were replaced by the top three teams from the 1999–2000 Segunda Liga:

- F.C. Paços de Ferreira
- S.C. Beira-Mar
- Desportivo das Aves

At the end of the 2000–01 season, the following teams were relegated to the Segunda Liga:

- S.C. Campomaiorense
- Desportivo das Aves
- Estrela da Amadora

== Team of the Season ==
Based on performance, consistency, and impact, the following players were widely recognized as part of the 2000–01 Primeira Liga Team of the Season:

Position	Player	Club
GK	Ricardo	Boavista
RB	Frechaut	Boavista
CB	Pedro Emanuel	Boavista
CB	Jorge Costa	Porto
LB	Rui Jorge	Sporting CP
DM	Petit	Boavista
CM	Erwin Sánchez	Boavista
CM	Hugo Viana	Sporting CP
RW	Martelinho	Boavista
LW	Duda	Boavista
ST	Pena	Porto

== Legacy ==
Boavista's 2000–01 title win remains one of the most iconic moments in Portuguese football history. They became the first club outside the “Big Three” to win the league since Belenenses in 1945–46.

Despite their success, Boavista struggled to maintain momentum. Financial issues and mismanagement led to their relegation in later years. Still, their 2000–01 season is remembered as a symbol of possibility in a league long dominated by giants.

== European competitions ==
Following the 2000–01 season, Portuguese clubs qualified for the following UEFA competitions:

- Boavista: Qualified for the 2001–02 UEFA Champions League group stage.
- Porto: Entered the second qualifying round of the 2001–02 UEFA Champions League.
- Sporting CP: Qualified for the 2001–02 UEFA Cup, exited in the first round.
- Marítimo: Entered the UEFA Cup via domestic cup qualification.
