= Carlos Bossio =

Argentine footballer

Personal information
- Full name: Carlos Gustavo Bossio
- Date of birth: 1 December 1973 (age 52)
- Place of birth: Córdoba, Argentina
- Height: 1.94 m (6 ft 4 in)
- Position: Goalkeeper

Youth career
- 1992: Las Palmas

Senior career*
Years	Team	Apps	(Gls)
1993–1994	Belgrano	26	(0)
1994–1999	Estudiantes	146	(1)
1999–2004	Benfica	20	(0)
2001–2002	→ Vitória de Setúbal (loan)	20	(0)
2004–2009	Lanús	179	(0)
2009–2011	Querétaro	45	(0)
2011–2012	Defensa y Justicia	1	(0)
2012–2013	Tiro Federal	32	(0)
Total		469	(1)

International career
1994–1996	Argentina	11	(0)

Managerial career
- 2022–2023: Racing (C)
Medal record
Men's football
Representing Argentina
Pan American Games
Gold medal – first place	1995 Mar del Plata	Team
Olympic Games
Silver medal – second place	1996 Atlanta	Team
- * Club domestic league appearances and goals

Carlos Gustavo Bossio (born 1 December 1973) is an Argentine football manager and former player who played as a goalkeeper. He started his managerial career in Racing (C) in 2022, leading the team to win the Torneo Federal A 2022 and its promotion to the Primera Nacional, until his resignation in June 2023.

Ironically nicknamed Chiquito ("little") due to his height of 1.94 metres, Bossio represented several teams, but achieved greater notability at Estudiantes and Lanús. He was part of the Argentina national team between 1994 and 1996, winning the golden medal at the 1995 Pan American Games and the silver medal at the 1996 Summer Olympics.

== Club career ==
Born in Córdoba, Bossio started at his home-town club, Las Palmas in 1992. He transferred to the nearby Belgrano de Córdoba in the following year and made his professional debut on 7 November 1993 against Gimnasia y Tiro. Until the end of the season, Bossio appeared in 26 league games. He then moved to the recently relegated, Estudiantes and helped them win the Primera B in the first season. On 12 May 1996, Bossio became the first goalkeeper in Argentine football to score a header, after connecting a corner kick in a match between Estudiantes and Racing Club for the conclusive draw in one goal. Until 1999, he played in 188 games for Estudiantes, 146 for the league.

In June 1999, Bossio, together with Rojas signed with Benfica. However, his breakthrough there was complicated through multiple reasons: he had a strong competitor in Enke; made a serious mistake in a pre-season match with Bayern Munich; and above all, Benfica only began paying Estudiantes in October, so the Argentinians blocked his debut by not releasing him. He made his debut for Benfica on 12 January 2000, in a Portuguese Cup match against Amora, and his league debut arrived on 27 February, leading to an eight-game run as starter that ended on 16 April. Still, in just 8 games, he conceded 14 goals while Enke, in 26 conceded 19 goals. In 2000–01, Bossio remained as back-up to Enke, again enjoying an 8-game run in the league from 31 March until 20 May, conceding 12 goals with Benfica finishing in sixth place. In the following season, Bossio was loaned out to Vitória de Setúbal until 30 June 2002. The 27-year-old commented the deal, saying: "I will certainly be able to show my quality and erase the twisted image that people have of me." He returned to Benfica in the 2002–03 and remained as second choice to another younger goalkeeper, this time, 20-year-old José Moreira. He played six games in two seasons, two of them for the 2003–04 Taça de Portugal, which earned him his first silverware in Portugal.

In June 2004, Bossio mutually terminated his contract with Benfica, and signed with Lanús. He remained their main starter for five seasons, winning the Apertura 2007 with them, their first-ever top league title. In July 2009, Bossio moved to Querétaro in the Liga MX. Two years later, the 37-year-old joined Defensa y Justicia on the Primera B Metropolitana, and retired a year later at third-tier side, Tiro Federal.

== International career ==
Bossio received his first called up for the national team in March 1995, for the 1995 Pan American Games that Argentina won. A year later, he would represent Argentina in the 1996 Summer Olympics, helping them reach the final, but losing it 3–2 to Nigeria.

== Honours ==
=== Player ===
Estudiantes

- Primera B: 1994–95

Benfica

- Taça de Portugal: 2003–04

Lanús

- Primera División: 2007 Apertura

Argentina

- Pan American Games: 1995
- Olympic Silver Medal: 1996

=== Manager ===
Racing de Córdoba

- Torneo Federal A: 2022
