= Paulo Cabral =

Portuguese footballer

Personal information
- Full name: Paulo Sérgio Martinho Cabral
- Date of birth: 24 June 1972 (age 54)
- Place of birth: Vila Nova de Cerveira, Portugal
- Height: 1.78 m (5 ft 10 in)
- Position: Fullback

Youth career
- 1984–1987: Cerveira
- 1987–1989: Caçadores Torreenses
- 1989–1991: Vianense

Senior career*
Years	Team	Apps	(Gls)
1991–1993	Vianense	33	(3)
1993–1994	Joane		
1994–1995	Tirsense	3	(0)
1995–1996	Vizela	27	(3)
1996–1997	Tirsense	29	(1)
1997–1998	Aves	27	(3)
1998–2001	Belenenses	90	(3)
2001–2003	Benfica	16	(0)
2002–2004	Benfica B	1	(0)
2004–2005	Belenenses	12	(0)
Total		238	(13)

International career
2000	Portugal	1	(0)
- * Club domestic league appearances and goals

Paulo Sérgio Martinho Cabral (born 24 June 1972) is a Portuguese former professional footballer who played as either a right or left back.

== Club career ==
Born in Vila Nova de Cerveira, Viana do Castelo District, Cabral started his senior career with local SC Vianense, promoting to the third division in his first year and playing two full seasons with the first team overall. After one year in amateur football he went straight to the Primeira Liga for 1994–95, with F.C. Tirsense, but his league input consisted of 24 minutes of action.

In the summer of 1995, Cabral returned to the third level with F.C. Vizela. Subsequently, as first-choice, he spent three seasons in division two with Tirsense, C.D. Aves and C.F. Os Belenenses, appearing in 31 matches for the latter club (one goal) in the 1998–99 campaign as it achieved top-flight promotion.

Cabral continued to be an undisputed starter with the Lisbon side in the following two seasons, which attracted the attention of neighbouring S.L. Benfica. He played 13 league games in his first year but soon fell out of favour, returning to Belenenses for a further year where he featured sparingly due to injuries, and retiring in June 2005 at the age of 33.

== International career ==
On 15 November 2000, Cabral earned his first – and only – cap for Portugal, coming on as a substitute for Carlos Secretário for the final ten minutes of a 2–1 friendly win over Israel.
