= Jorge Ribeiro =

Portuguese footballer (born 1981)

Personal information
- Full name: Jorge Miguel de Oliveira Ribeiro
- Date of birth: 9 November 1981 (age 44)
- Place of birth: Lisbon, Portugal
- Height: 1.72 m (5 ft 8 in)
- Position: Wing-back

Youth career
- 1992–1999: Benfica

Senior career*
Years	Team	Apps	(Gls)
1999–2002	Benfica B	46	(7)
2000–2002	Benfica	5	(0)
2000	→ Santa Clara (loan)	3	(0)
2002–2004	Varzim	53	(4)
2004	→ Gil Vicente (loan)	14	(0)
2005–2007	Dynamo Moscow	27	(4)
2006	→ Málaga (loan)	5	(0)
2007	→ Aves (loan)	14	(2)
2007–2008	Boavista	26	(8)
2008–2011	Benfica	15	(1)
2010–2011	→ Vitória Guimarães (loan)	14	(2)
2011–2012	Granada	0	(0)
2013–2015	Aves	78	(5)
2015–2016	Atlético	39	(4)
2016–2019	Farense	82	(18)
2019–2020	Casa Pia	14	(4)
Total		435	(59)

International career
2001	Portugal U20	6	(0)
2001–2004	Portugal U21	24	(5)
2004	Portugal B	2	(0)
2004	Portugal U23	4	(1)
2002–2008	Portugal	9	(0)
Medal record
Men's football
Representing Portugal
UEFA European Under-21 Championship
Third place	2004 Germany
- * Club domestic league appearances and goals

Jorge Miguel de Oliveira Ribeiro (born 9 November 1981) is a Portuguese former professional footballer. Mainly a left-back, he could also play as a wing-back or midfielder.

He totalled 118 Primeira Liga games and 15 goals, for six clubs including two spells at Benfica, and added 185 appearances in LigaPro for as many teams. Additionally, he had stints in Russia with Dynamo Moscow and in Spain.

Ribeiro earned 52 caps for Portugal at youth level, and represented the country at Euro 2008.

== Club career ==
=== Early career ===
Born in Lisbon, Ribeiro was brought up in Benfica's youth system. In 2002, he was one of three young players sold to fellow Primeira Liga club Varzim, along with Rui Baião and Pepa. In January 2005, after angering his employers Gil Vicente by an unauthorised absence, he was purchased by the Russian Premier League's Dynamo Moscow; unadjusted, he left the team precisely a year after, joining La Liga side Málaga until the end of the season, which ended in relegation.

Ribeiro returned to Portugal in January 2007, joining Aves still on loan from the Russians. On 4 February, he made his debut for his new club in a 1–0 away loss against Braga, as the team he represented again dropped down a level. He would be purchased by Boavista in July and blossomed as a top-flight player, scoring eight league goals during his only campaign, many from free kicks.

=== Return to Benfica ===
On 24 July 2008, Ribeiro returned to Benfica after a deal was agreed upon in April. Having scored his first goal for them on 22 September in a 4–3 win at Paços de Ferreira, he eventually became first-choice left-back, overtaking Brazilian Léo.

However, Ribeiro soon lost his starting place to David Luiz, and eventually was deemed surplus to requirements. In the 2009–10 season, as Benfica won the league and the League Cup, he did not play a single competitive match, often training separately and choosing to see out his lucrative contract rather than signing with another club.

On 16 August 2011, after spending five months on loan to Vitória de Guimarães, Ribeiro signed for two years with Granada on a free transfer. He only made one official appearance with the Andalusians – 55 minutes against Real Sociedad in the round of 32 of the Copa del Rey (4–1 away defeat)– losing his No. 16 jersey in the winter transfer window and being released from contract on 17 February 2012.

=== Later years ===
In the summer of 2013, Ribeiro returned to active, penning a one-year contract with Olhanense but being released less than one month later, still during pre-season play. He subsequently returned to Aves, where he was a regular until his departure.

Ribeiro signed a one-year deal with Atlético Clube de Portugal, also of the LigaPro, in July 2015. After the season ended with relegation to the third tier, he moved to Farense at that level. Having scored six times in 30 games to win promotion in his second year, he extended his contract until 30 June 2019.

In July 2019, the 37-year-old Ribeiro joined Casa Pia in his hometown, newly promoted to division two. He and captain João Coito rescinded their contracts the following February; Ribeiro, who left due to disputes with new manager Ricardo Peres, retired to spend time with his family instead of taking offers to move to Brazil.

== International career ==
Ribeiro made his debut for Portugal in November 2002, against Scotland. He was part of the under-23 team that was eliminated in the group stage at the 2004 Summer Olympics in Greece, scoring in the 4–2 defeat against Costa Rica in Heraklion.

Ribeiro did not play a senior game again until a 2–2 draw away to Liechtenstein in October 2004. After another two-year absence, he was again called and played as a replacement for right-back José Bosingwa in UEFA Euro 2008 qualifiers with Azerbaijan and Kazakhstan on 13 and 17 October, respectively.

With eight caps, Ribeiro was selected for the squad that competed in the finals in Austria and Switzerland, as older brother Maniche was left out. He appeared as a substitute in the last group stage match against Switzerland, a 2–0 loss that would be his final international.

== Personal life ==
Jorge's older brother Nuno was also a footballer. A midfielder, he represented, among others, Benfica, Porto and Chelsea, and the two were teammates at Dynamo Moscow.

== Career statistics ==
As of match played 2 April 2017

Appearances and goals by club, season and competition
Club	Season	League		National cup		League cup		Europe		Total	
Club	Season	Apps	Goals	Apps	Goals	Apps	Goals	Apps	Goals	Apps	Goals
Benfica B	1999–00	8	0	—		—		—		8	0
Benfica B	2000–01	16	2	—		—		—		16	2
Benfica B	2001–02	22	5	—		—		—		22	5
Benfica B	Total	46	7	—		—		—		46	7
Benfica	1999–00	1	0	1	0	—		0	0	2	0
Benfica	2000–01	0	0	0	0	—		0	0	0	0
Benfica	2001–02	4	0	1	0	—		—		5	0
Benfica	Total	5	0	2	0	—		0	0	7	0
Santa Clara (loan)	2000–01	3	0	0	0	—		—		3	0
Varzim	2002–03	30	2	2	0	—		—		32	2
Varzim	2003–04	23	2	1	0	—		—		24	2
Varzim	Total	53	4	3	0	—		—		56	4
Gil Vicente (loan)	2004–05	14	0	1	0	—		—		15	0
Dynamo Moscow	2005	27	4	2	0	—		—		29	4
Málaga (loan)	2005–06	5	0	0	0	—		—		5	0
Aves (loan)	2006–07	14	2	0	0	—		—		14	2
Boavista	2007–08	26	8	1	0	0	0	—		27	8
Benfica	2008–09	15	1	0	0	2	1	4	0	21	2
Benfica	2009–10	0	0	0	0	0	0	0	0	0	0
Benfica	Total	15	1	0	0	2	1	4	0	21	2
Vitória Guimarães (loan)	2010–11	14	2	4	0	2	0	—		20	2
Granada	2011–12	0	0	1	0	—		—		1	0
Aves	2013–14	41	3	4	0	0	0	—		45	3
Aves	2014–15	37	2	1	0	3	0	—		41	2
Aves	Total	78	5	5	0	3	0	—		86	5
Atlético	2015–16	39	4	0	0	2	0	—		41	4
Farense	2016–17	22	8	3	2	—		—		25	10
Career total		361	45	22	2	9	1	4	0	396	48

== Honours ==
Benfica

- Taça da Liga: 2008–09

Vitória Guimarães

- Taça de Portugal runner-up: 2010–11

Portugal U21

- Toulon Tournament: 2001
