= Ednilson =

Bissau-Guinean footballer

Personal information
- Full name: Ednilson Pedro Rocha Andrade Mendes
- Date of birth: 25 September 1982 (age 44)
- Place of birth: Bissau, Guinea-Bissau
- Height: 1.71 m (5 ft 7 in)
- Position: Defensive midfielder

Youth career
- 1993–1999: Boavista
- 1999–2000: Roma

Senior career*
Years	Team	Apps	(Gls)
2000–2001	Roma	1	(0)
2001–2005	Benfica	43	(0)
2003–2004	→ Vitória Guimarães (loan)	8	(0)
2004–2005	→ Gil Vicente (loan)	20	(0)
2006–2007	OFI	17	(0)
2008	Partizan	14	(0)
2008–2009	AEK Larnaca	5	(0)
2009–2012	Dinamo Tbilisi	34	(0)
2012	Vasas	0	(0)
Total		142	(0)

International career
2000–2003	Portugal U21	26	(2)
2010–2011	Guinea-Bissau	3	(0)
Medal record
Men's football
Representing Portugal
UEFA European Under-17 Championship
Winner	1996 Austria
- * Club domestic league appearances and goals

Ednilson Pedro Rocha Andrade Mendes (born 25 September 1982), known simply as Ednilson, is a Bissau-Guinean former footballer who played as a defensive midfielder.

== Club career ==
Ednilson was born in Bissau, Guinea-Bissau, moving to Portugal at an early age. Not yet 17, he was bought by Italy's AS Roma, but in January 2001 moved to F.C. Alverca for 618 million lire, after he refused to extend his initial contract. Without no official appearances, he was sold to S.L. Benfica.

With the Lisbon club, Ednilson was relatively used during two seasons, after which he was loaned to fellow Primeira Liga sides Vitória S.C. and Gil Vicente FC, playing with the latter precisely as Benfica won the national league after 11 years. After almost two years at OFI (17 matches in total) he spent some months without a club, after which he rejoined countryman Almami Moreira at FK Partizan – both were youth graduates at Boavista FC – helping the Belgrade team to the double in his short spell.

Ednilson then played one year in Cyprus with AEK Larnaca FC. On 27 November 2009, he signed a 1 1/2-year contract with FC Dinamo Tbilisi.

On 21 February 2012, Ednilson changed clubs and countries once again, signing for Vasas SC in Budapest for five months. He was released at the end of the campaign (which ended in relegation), with no official appearances to his credit.

== Club statistics ==
Season	Team	Country	Division	Apps	Goals
1999–00	Roma	Italy	1	1	0
2000–01	Benfica	Portugal	1	13	0
2001–02	Benfica	Portugal	1	22	0
2002–03	Benfica	Portugal	1	8	0
2003–04	Vitória Guimarães	Portugal	1	8	0
2004–05	Gil Vicente	Portugal	1	20	0
2005–06	OFI	Greece	1	4	0
2006–07	OFI	Greece	1	13	0
2007–08	Partizan	Serbia	1	14	0
2008–09	AEK Larnaca	Cyprus	1	5	0
2009–10	Dinamo Tbilisi	Georgia	1	29	0

== International career ==
After having represented Portugal at U21 level between 2000 and 2003, Ednilson accepted the calls of his country of birth, Guinea-Bissau, when their national team was resurrected in 2010, after three years of inactivity. Ednilson made 3 appearances between 2010 and 2011 for Guinea-Bissau.
