= Chano (footballer, born 1965) =

Spanish footballer

Personal information
- Full name: Sebastián Cruzado Fernández
- Date of birth: 28 February 1965 (age 61)
- Place of birth: Huelva, Spain
- Height: 1.81 m (5 ft 11 in)
- Position: Midfielder

Youth career
- Betis

Senior career*
| Years | Team | Apps | (Gls) |
| 1984–1986 | Betis B | | |
| 1984–1991 | Betis | 171 | (16) |
| 1991–1999 | Tenerife | 249 | (27) |
| 1999–2001 | Benfica | 56 | (2) |
| Total | | 476 | (45) |

International career
| 1994 | Spain | 1 | (0) |
- * Club domestic league appearances and goals

Sebastián Cruzado Fernández (born 28 February 1965), known as Chano, is a retired Spanish professional footballer who played mainly as an attacking midfielder.

== Club career ==
Chano was born in Huelva, Andalusia. After being definitely promoted to Real Betis' first team for the 1986–87 season, he (who featured in 137 La Liga matches with the club, scoring 11 goals – he also spent one year in the second division) never ceased to be a nuclear midfield element in the following campaigns.

His status as a regular player continued with Chano's 1991 move to CD Tenerife, where he spent eight years, helping to the side's domestic and European consolidations (two UEFA Cup participations). From 1986 to 1997 he never played fewer than 31 league games per season, but only managed 32 appearances in his last two years in Spain combined due to a severe knee condition.

At already 34, Chano moved to Portugal's S.L. Benfica, still managing to have some impact in his two-year spell, after which he retired from football.

== International career ==
On 9 February 1994, Chano earned his sole cap for Spain, as he played the entire friendly match with Poland (1–1) in front of a familiar crowd in Santa Cruz de Tenerife.
