= José Pratas =

Portuguese football referee

- Full name: José João Mendes Pratas
- Born: Évora, Portugal
- Died: October 1, 2017 (aged 59); Hospital do Espírito Santo of Évora, Portugal

Domestic
Years	League	Role
1988–1989 2002-2003	Primeira Liga	Referee

International
Years	League	Role
1993–2003	FIFA	Referee

José João Mendes Pratas (6 October 1957 – 1 October 2017) was a Portuguese football referee.

He was born in Évora, where he died on 1 October 2017, at the age of 59. He was in the first national category between 1988-1989 and 2002-2003, arbitrating about 200 games in the Primeira Liga. He also refereed the final of the Cup of 1993-1994.

He was international referee between 1993 and 2002, retiring from the arbitration in 2003. The finish of his career was announced on December 31, 2002, having refereed his last match at Povoa de Varzim in Varzim S.C.-FC Porto. When he died in 2017, he was an observer of the Arbitration Council of the Portuguese Football Federation.

According to the Portuguese Professional Football League, "he was one of the referees who made the most of the class. José Pratas represented a generation of referees who had great relevance in the development of professional football".
