= Sérgio Lomba =

Mozambican footballer (born 1973)

Personal information
- Full name: Sérgio Miguel Lopes Lomba da Costa
- Date of birth: 11 August 1973 (age 53)
- Place of birth: Beira, Mozambique
- Height: 1.80 m (5 ft 11 in)
- Position: Defender

Youth career
- 1985–1990: Vianense
- 1990–1992: Vitória
- 1992–1993: Vila Real
- 1993–1994: Vianense

Senior career*
| Years | Team | Apps | (Gls) |
| 1994–1995 | Freamunde | 30 | (2) |
| 1995–1997 | Vianense | 59 | (4) |
| 1997–2002 | Gil Vicente | 135 | (9) |
| 2002–2005 | Moreirense | 88 | (3) |
| 2005–2006 | Penafiel | 20 | (0) |
| 2006–2008 | Zamora | 66 | (4) |
| 2008–2009 | Vianense | 16 | (0) |
| 2009–2010 | Villaralbo | 0 | (0) |
| 2012–2013 | SC Valenciano | 4 | (0) |

International career^{‡}
| 2006 | Mozambique | 1 | (1) |
- * Club domestic league appearances and goals as of 2 July 2017 ‡ National team caps and goals as of 2 July 2017

Sérgio Miguel Lopes Lomba da Costa (born 11 August 1973), better known as Sérgio Lomba, is a Mozambican former professional football player who played as a defender.

== Club career ==
Lomba is best known for his stints in the Primeira Liga with Gil Vicente and Moreirense.

== International career ==
Lomba was a one-time international for the Mozambique national team, scoring on his debut in a friendly 1–2 loss to Malawi on 25 June 2006.

== Personal life ==
Lomba is maternal uncle of Pedro Neto, who is also a footballer.

== Career statistics ==
=== International ===
Scores and results list Mozambique's goal tally first, score column indicates score after each Lomba goal.

List of international goals scored by Sérgio Lomba
| No. | Date | Venue | Opponent | Score | Result | Competition |
|---|---|---|---|---|---|---|
| 1 | 25 June 2006 | Estádio 1º de Maio, Maputo, Mozambique | Malawi | 1–1 | 1–2 | Friendly |
