= Estádio Engenheiro Vidal Pinheiro =

Multi-use stadium in Porto, Portugal

Coordinates: 41.169°N 8.599°W

- Vidal Pinheiro
- Interactive map of Estádio Engenheiro Vidal Pinheiro
- Location: Porto, Portugal
- Owner: S.C. Salgueiros
- Capacity: 11,000
- Surface: Grass
- Field size: 105 x 65 metres

Construction
- Opened: 1932
- Renovated: 1984, 1999
- Closed: 2005
- Demolished: 2006

Tenant
- S.C. Salgueiros

Estádio Engenheiro Vidal Pinheiro was a multi-use stadium in Porto, Portugal. It was used mostly for football matches and was the home stadium of S.C. Salgueiros. The stadium was able to hold 11,000 people. It was demolished in 2006 to make way for a subway station for Metro do Porto.
