= Diogo Luís =

Portuguese footballer

Personal information
- Full name: Diogo Miguel Alves Luís
- Date of birth: August 10, 1980 (age 46)
- Place of birth: Lisbon, Portugal
- Height: 1.85 m (6 ft 1 in)
- Position: Left back

Youth career
- 1995–1999: Benfica

Senior career*
Years	Team	Apps	(Gls)
1999–2001	Benfica B	41	(3)
2000–2001	Benfica	26	(0)
2001–2002	→ Alverca (loan)	11	(0)
2002–2004	Beira-Mar	25	(0)
2004–2005	Naval	13	(0)
2004–2007	Estoril Praia	41	(0)
2007–2008	Beira-Mar	25	(0)
2008	Leixões	1	(0)
2008–2009	Apollon Limassol	9	(0)
Total		192	(3)

International career
2000–2001	Portugal U21	4	(0)
- * Club domestic league appearances and goals

Diogo Miguel Alves Luís (born 10 August 1980) is a Portuguese retired footballer who played as a left back.

== Football career ==
Born in Lisbon, Luís was a prospect of S.L. Benfica youth system, where he arrived at age 15. On 29 August 1999, he made his debut for the B team in the third tier, in a match against Portimonense.

After forty appearances in the reserve side, he was called up to the first team by José Mourinho, due to the lack of available left-backs. He debuted on 2 October 2000 in a home tie against Braga, and a further twenty-two league caps in his first season, as Benfica had their worst league finish ever.

In the following season, Marco Caneira earned the left-back position, so Luís playing time was greatly reduced, being loaned to Alverca on 15 January 2002. On 18 July 2002, he moved to Beira-Mar in a deal involving Cristiano going the other direction.

After two years in Aveiro, he moved to four more clubs in the next five years, which included a stint in Cyprus, retiring at 28 in 2009. He now works as financial advisor in a bank.
