= João Tomás =

Portuguese footballer

Personal information
- Full name: João Henrique Pataco Tomás
- Date of birth: 27 May 1975 (age 51)
- Place of birth: Oliveira do Bairro, Portugal
- Height: 1.88 m (6 ft 2 in)
- Position: Striker

Youth career
- 1986–1993: Oliveira Bairro
- 1993–1994: Troviscal

Senior career*
Years	Team	Apps	(Gls)
1994–1995	Águas Boas		
1995–1996	Anadia		
1996–1999	Académica	81	(28)
2000–2001	Benfica	41	(19)
2001–2004	Betis	32	(7)
2003–2004	→ Vitória Guimarães (loan)	20	(3)
2004–2006	Braga	59	(30)
2006–2007	Al-Arabi	17	(8)
2007	Al-Rayyan	9	(8)
2007–2008	Braga	10	(1)
2008–2009	Boavista	28	(12)
2009–2010	Rio Ave	15	(6)
2010	Sharjah	1	(2)
2010–2013	Rio Ave	65	(34)
2013	Libolo	?	(4)
Total		378+	(162+)

International career
2000	Portugal B	2	(0)
2000–2007	Portugal	4	(1)
- * Club domestic league appearances and goals

João Henrique Pataco Tomás (born 27 May 1975) is a Portuguese former professional footballer who played as a striker.

He represented mostly Braga (three seasons) and Rio Ave (four) in a 19-year senior career, also having a one-and-a-half-season spell at Benfica and amassing Primeira Liga totals of 261 matches and 101 goals. Abroad, he spent some time in Spain and Asia.

Tomás was a Portugal international in the 2000s.

== Club career ==
Born in Oliveira do Bairro, Aveiro District, Tomás achieved some notability playing for Académica de Coimbra, earning the nickname of O Jardel de Coimbra (Coimbra's Jardel) after Mário Jardel.

He subsequently represented S.L. Benfica (scoring 17 goals in his only full season, 2000–01), Real Betis – joining in summer 2001 alongside his teammate José Calado, he netted seven times in La Liga in his debut campaign, but appeared scarcely in the second– Vitória de Guimarães and S.C. Braga, to where he returned after a Qatar Stars League stint in 2006–07 with Al-Arabi SC and Al-Rayyan SC, having left for Asia for free.

In 2004–05 and the following season, while with Braga, Tomás was the second-best scorer in the Primeira Liga. In 2007–08, however, he was very rarely used, due to injuries and the emergence of Austrian Roland Linz, and in July 2008 he signed for Boavista FC, relegated to the Segunda Liga due to financial irregularities.

Two matches into the 2008–09 season, Tomás entailed negotiations with another Qatari club, Al Ahli SC (Doha), but quickly returned to Boavista. In June 2009, as his team suffered a second consecutive drop, he joined Rio Ave F.C. at age 34.

Tomás fared well in his return to the top flight, scoring six goals in the league and eight overall, but moved abroad once again in February 2010, with UAE Pro League side Sharjah FC. He returned to Rio Ave in July, agreeing to a one-year contract.

On 30 October 2010, Tomás scored in a 2–0 home win against his former team Braga, as Rio Ave won their first game of the campaign; earlier, in the first half, he missed a penalty kick. In the first year in his second spell in Vila do Conde he finished second in the scorers chart, only trailing FC Porto's Hulk.

Tomás moved abroad again in January 2013, signing for C.R.D. Libolo in the Angolan Girabola; Shortly before that, his hat-trick helped the visitors to defeat Vitória de Setúbal 5–3, and he reached 101 goals in the Portuguese top tier in the process.

After retiring, Tomás worked in directorial capacities at F.C. Famalicão, C.D. Trofense and S.C.U. Torreense.

== International career ==
Tomás earned four caps for Portugal. His first game was in a 2–1 victory over Israel in a friendly, on 15 November 2000.

On 22 May 2007, after a 5 1/2-year absence, Tomás was recalled to the national team by Luiz Felipe Scolari, playing against a Kuwaiti club on 5 June in Kuwait City and scoring in the 1–1 draw.

== Career statistics ==
Appearances and goals by club, season and competition
Club	Season	League			Cup		League Cup		Europe		Total	
Club	Season	Division	Apps	Goals	Apps	Goals	Apps	Goals	Apps	Goals	Apps	Goals
Académica	1996–97	Segunda Liga	15	1	4	2	0	0	0	0	19	3
Académica	1997–98	Primeira Liga	28	7	3	0	0	0	0	0	31	7
Académica	1998–99	Primeira Liga	21	1	1	0	0	0	0	0	22	1
Académica	1999–00	Segunda Liga	17	19	3	3	0	0	0	0	20	22
Académica	Total		81	28	11	5	0	0	0	0	92	33
Benfica	1999–00	Primeira Liga	9	2	0	0	0	0	0	0	9	2
Benfica	2000–01	Primeira Liga	31	17	3	1	0	0	2	1	36	19
Benfica	2001–02	Primeira Liga	1	0	0	0	0	0	–		1	0
Benfica	Total		41	19	3	1	0	0	2	1	46	21
Betis	2001–02	La Liga	20	7	0	0	0	0	0	0	20	7
Betis	2002–03	La Liga	11	0	0	0	0	0	2	1	13	1
Betis	Total		31	7	0	0	0	0	2	1	33	8
Vitória Guimarães	2003–04	Primeira Liga	20	3	2	1	0	0	–		22	4
Braga	2004–05	Primeira Liga	29	15	2	1	0	0	2	0	33	16
Braga	2005–06	Primeira Liga	30	15	4	2	0	0	4	1	38	18
Braga	Total		59	30	6	3	0	0	6	1	71	34
Al-Arabi	2006–07	Qatar Stars League	17	8	0	0	0	0	0	0	17	8
Al-Rayyan	2006–07	Qatar Stars League	9	8	0	0	0	0	–		9	8
Braga	2007–08	Primeira Liga	10	1	1	0	0	0	1	0	12	1
Boavista	2008–09	Segunda Liga	28	13	2	1	0	0	–		30	14
Rio Ave	2009–10	Primeira Liga	15	6	1	0	3	2	–		19	8
Sharjah	2009–10	UAE Pro League	1	2	0	0	–		–		1	2
Rio Ave	2010–11	Primeira Liga	29	16	3	2	2	0	–		34	18
Rio Ave	2011–12	Primeira Liga	27	11	2	3	2	2	–		31	16
Rio Ave	2012–13	Primeira Liga	9	7	2	3	1	2	–		12	12
Rio Ave	Total		65	34	7	8	5	4	–		77	44
