= José Calado =

Portuguese footballer

Personal information
- Full name: José António Calado da Silva
- Date of birth: 1 March 1974 (age 52)
- Place of birth: Lisbon, Portugal
- Height: 1.79 m (5 ft 10 in)
- Position: Central midfielder

Youth career
- 1987–1988: Belenenses
- 1988–1989: Casa Pia
- 1989–1990: Belenenses
- 1990–1991: Casa Pia

Senior career*
Years	Team	Apps	(Gls)
1991–1992	Casa Pia		
1992–1995	Estrela Amadora	53	(3)
1995–2001	Benfica	138	(4)
2001–2004	Betis	20	(1)
2003–2004	→ Poli Ejido (loan)	30	(8)
2004–2007	Poli Ejido	70	(7)
2007–2008	APOP	26	(3)
2008–2010	AEP	39	(2)
Total		376	(28)

International career
1994–1996	Portugal U21	14	(2)
1996	Portugal U23	6	(2)
1995–1998	Portugal	4	(0)
- * Club domestic league appearances and goals

José António Calado da Silva (born 1 March 1974), known as Calado, is a Portuguese former professional footballer who played as a central midfielder.

After coming to prominence in his home country with Benfica, he spent the rest of his 19-year career with two teams in Spain and two in Cyprus. He amassed Primeira Liga totals of 184 games and seven goals over eight seasons.

== Club career ==
Calado was born in Lisbon. He started his career with local Casa Pia AC, representing C.F. Estrela da Amadora and S.L. Benfica afterwards and reaching international status with the latter club.

In the summer of 2001, Calado signed for La Liga side Real Betis alongside his teammate João Tomás, but both failed to settle, with the midfielder only totalling 22 competitive matches in two seasons. He spent 2003–04 on loan to Segunda División team Polideportivo Ejido, and the move was subsequently made permanent.

After 102 overall appearances with 15 goals (he missed the entire 2006–07 campaign due to injury), Calado moved to Cyprus, first with APOP Kinyras FC, joining AEP Paphos FC for 2008–09. He featured regularly for both clubs during his Cypriot First Division spell, leaving the latter in early 2010 and retiring at age 36.

== International career ==
Calado won four caps for the Portugal national team in three years. He also represented the nation at the 1996 Summer Olympics.

== Honours ==
Benfica

- Taça de Portugal: 1995–96
