= Rui Baião =

Portuguese footballer

Personal information
- Full name: Rui Miguel Marques Baião
- Date of birth: 4 September 1980 (age 46)
- Place of birth: Montijo, Portugal
- Height: 1.85 m (6 ft 1 in)
- Position: Midfielder

Youth career
- 1993−1995: Barreirense
- 1995−1999: Benfica

Senior career*
Years	Team	Apps	(Gls)
1999−2002	Benfica B	48	(5)
2000	→ Alverca (loan)	0	(0)
2001−2002	Benfica	13	(1)
2002−2003	Varzim	32	(2)
2003−2004	Estrela Amadora	16	(0)
2004−2005	Gil Vicente	4	(0)
2005	→ Kerkyra (loan)	3	(0)
2005−2007	Portimonense	33	(10)
2008−2010	Olhanense	43	(0)
2010−2011	Fátima	8	(0)
2011−2014	Pinhalnovense	49	(2)
Total		249	(20)

International career
1996	Portugal U16	2	(0)
1997−1998	Portugal U18	16	(1)
- * Club domestic league appearances and goals

Rui Miguel Marques Baião (born 4 September 1980) is a Portuguese former footballer who played as a midfielder.

== Club career ==
Born in Montijo, Setúbal District, Baião joined S.L. Benfica's youth system at the age of 15, making his senior debuts with the B-team in the third division. His maiden appearance in the Primeira Liga occurred on 8 April 2001, as he started in a 3–0 home win against C.S. Marítimo on 8 April 2001, and he scored the first of three goals in the competition during his career on 20 May of that year in a 1–1 draw at S.C. Salgueiros.

After terminating his contract, Baião was supposed to sign with FC Porto via Varzim S.C. but it never materialized. From 2002 to 2011 he alternated between the top flight and the second level, representing Varzim, C.F. Estrela da Amadora, Gil Vicente FC, Portimonense SC, S.C. Olhanense and C.D. Fátima. He also had a brief stint in Greece, with A.O. Kerkyra.

Baião retired in January 2014 whilst at the service of lower league side C.D. Pinhalnovense, due to a heart condition. He was 33 years old.
