= 1996–97 S.L. Benfica season =

Benfica
1996–97 season
- President: Manuel Damásio
- Head coach: Paulo Autuori (until 19 January 1997); Mário Wilson (interim until 26 January 1997); Manuel José
- Stadium: Estádio da Luz
- Primeira Divisão: 3rd
- Taça de Portugal: Runners-up
- Supertaça Cândido de Oliveira: Runners-up
- UEFA Cup Winners' Cup: Quarter-finals
- Top goalscorer: League: Donizete (7); All: João Pinto (16)
- Highest home attendance: 75,000 v Porto (11 January 1997)
- Lowest home attendance: 3,000 v Leça (18 May 1997)
- Biggest win: 4 goal difference in 4 matches
- Biggest defeat: Benfica 0–5 Porto (18 September 1996)
Home colours	Away colours

The 1996–97 European football season was the 93rd season of Sport Lisboa e Benfica's existence and the club's 63rd consecutive season in the top flight of Portuguese football. The season ran from 1 July 1996 to 30 June 1997; Benfica competed domestically in the Primeira Divisão and the Taça de Portugal. The club also participated in the UEFA Cup Winners Cup as a result of winning the previous Taça de Portugal.

To manage the team in the new season, Benfica appointed Paulo Autuori. The Brazilian had just won the Brasileirão with Botafogo and was working in the background with the club since January 1996. He signed Jamir and Donizete from Botafogo, plus others like Jorge Bermúdez or Ronaldo Guiaro. Major departures included Ricardo Gomes, Paulo Bento and Daniel Kenedy.

The season started with different outcomes in the different competitions. While in the Primeira Divisão, Benfica reached the first place by September; in the Supertaça Cândido de Oliveira, the panorama was the opposite, with Benfica conceding a five-nil home loss with FC Porto. Until January, Autuori led the team through the first and second round of the Cup Winner's Cup, and battled with Sporting over the second place.

In January, the league campaign took a turn for the worse, Benfica lost twice in a row and Autuori was sacked. Mário Wilson was interim in one game (another loss); before the permanent appointment of Manuel José. With José, Benfica performance in the Primeira Divisão became much more irregular. Consecutive wins and consecutive losses were followed by intercalating wins and draws. In May and June Benfica, lost four times in five match-days, and hit new record lows, both in number of losses and points to league winner. In the domestic cup, José led them to their second final in a row, but lost it to Boavista.

== Season summary ==
In the wake of a Cup-winning campaign, Benfica opened the new season by appointing a new manager, Paulo Autuori, who had been working with the club for past six months. The Brazilian manager had just finished the 1995 Campeonato Brasileiro Série A, where he led Botafogo to their second league title in history. From his former club, he brought in Jamir and Donizete, plus directly recommended the purchase of Bermúdez.

The season began with the first leg of the 1996 Supertaça Cândido de Oliveira against FC Porto, bringing a one-goal deficit back. A week later; on the opening game of the Primeira Liga, Benfica drops two points against S.C. Braga in a home draw. Still, with two convincing wins in early September, Benfica reached top of the table, together with four other teams. With the second leg of the Supercup next, Benfica received Porto on 18 September. However, the contend quickly became an unbalanced one, with Porto scoring five goals to none, as Preud'Homme prevented an even darker outcome The team was not disturbed by this defeat, and continued racking up consecutive league wins, even achieving a two-point lead over the second place; while the results in Europe were looking accordingly.

"It is the first year of the longest title drought ever. Three managers pass through the bench to use 34 players and put Benfica in an unpleasant third place, with ten losses and at 27 points from the first (both club records). It starts badly with Paulo Autuori, and the loss of the Supercup, were the fans witness a consistent performance from Porto. The grief increased in January, with three straight losses, which did not happen in 40 years – Lusitano de Èvora, Belenenses and Sporting in October/November of 1957. Autuori is sacked and succeeded by Mário Wilson. A game later, Wilson relinquishes his place in favour of Manuel José, who succeeds in taking the team to the quarter-finals of the UEFA Cup Winners Cup and to the Portuguese Cup final. In between, new embarrassment caused by three straight losses, curiously enough, caused by the same teams of the previous series."

— Rui Miguel Tovar on the season events

In late October, Benfica visited Sporting for the Lisbon derby, losing one-nil and dropping down one position. A week later, with a further two more points dropped, Porto opened a three-point gap at the front. By the time the Clássico arrived, the distance was already five points. Losing 1–2 to Porto, increased it to eight. Affected by the defeat, Benfica lost for a second time on a row, with the priority changing from battling Porto in the title race, to defending the second place from Sporting. Autuori was sacked immediately, and Mário Wilson was appointed interim for one game. The move did not have any effect on the team sharpness, as Benfica lost for a third in a row for the first time since 1957–58. The club lapped the first round of the league already one point behind their cross-town rivals Sporting, and fourteen from Porto. Manuel José was chosen was new manager on 26 January. The 50-year-old had managed Sporting and Boavista before with mild success, and was tasked with saving the season.

José's first game was a difficult visit to Braga; Benfica equalized one-nil and brought a point home, but lost two for Sporting. With the league race resolved, Benfica focused on the Portuguese Cup, progressing to the sixth round after defeating C.S. Marítimo. March was a particularly difficult month, as the team dropped eight points in just three match-days, being in danger of losing third place fourth place. In the UEFA Cup Winners' Cup, Benfica ended its European campaign, after not being able to revert a 2–0 home loss against Rui Costa's Fiorentina, despite a marginal win in Florence.

In April, the team gained some distance to the fourth place, S.C. Salgueiros, allowing them to focus on the Portuguese Cup. With the advantage of receiving smaller teams at home in the knock-out stages, Benfica progressed to the semi-finals after beating Dragões Sandinenses in the quarter-final, meeting Porto next. On the last day of April, the club defeated Porto by two-nil with goals from Valdir and Edgar Pacheco, reaching a second consecutive Portuguese Cup final, where they enter as title-holders. On the league campaign, Benfica track record on the final six league match-days, was four losses, a win and a draw, losing fifteen more points, ending the season a record-breaking twenty-seven points from Porto, fourteen from Sporting. On 10 June, in the 1997 Taça de Portugal final, Benfica was surprised by Boavista, with a two-nil at the half-hour, they could not recover, giving Boavista their fifth national cup.

== Competitions ==
Win Draw Loss Postponed

=== Overall record ===
Competition	First match	Last match	Record								
Competition	First match	Last match	G	W	D	L	GF	GA	GD	Win %	Source
Primeira Divisão	25 August 1996	15 June 1997	34	17	7	10	49	30	+19	50.00	
Taça de Portugal	8 December 1996	10 June 1997	6	5	0	1	17	8	+9	83.33	
UEFA Cup Winners' Cup	12 September 1996	20 March 1997	6	4	1	1	10	5	+5	66.67	
Supertaça	18 August 1996	18 September 1996	2	0	0	2	0	6	−6	0.00	
Total			48	26	8	14	76	49	+27	54.17	

=== Supertaça ===
18 August 1996 First leg	Porto	1–0	Benfica	Porto
20:30	Domingos 42'	Report		Stadium: Estádio das Antas; Referee: Lucílio Baptista

18 September 1996 Second leg	Benfica	0–5 (0–6 agg.)	Porto	Lisbon
20:00			Edmilson 3'; Artur 43'; Jorge Costa 46'; Wetl 56'; Drulovic 85'	Stadium: Estádio da Luz; Referee: António Rola

=== Primeira Divisão ===
==== League table ====
Pos	Team	Pld	W	D	L	GF	GA	GD	Pts	Qualification or relegation
1	Porto (C)	34	27	4	3	80	24	+56	85	Qualification to Champions League group stage
2	Sporting CP	34	22	6	6	55	19	+36	72	Qualification to Champions League second qualifying round
3	Benfica	34	17	7	10	49	30	+19	58	Qualification to UEFA Cup first round
4	Braga	34	15	10	9	39	40	−1	55	Qualification to UEFA Cup first round
5	Vitória de Guimarães	34	15	8	11	51	46	+5	53	Qualification to UEFA Cup first round

Source: Primeira Divisão
Rules for classification: 1st points, 2nd head-to-head, 3rd goals average
(C) Champions

==== Results by round ====
Round	1	2	3	4	5	6	7	8	9	10	11	12	13	14	15	16	17	18	19	20	21	22	23	24	25	26	27	28	29	30	31	32	33	34
Ground	H	A	H	A	H	A	H	A	H	A	H	A	H	A	H	A	H	A	H	A	H	A	H	A	H	A	H	A	H	A	H	A	H	A
Result	D	W	W	W	W	W	W	L	D	W	W	W	D	W	L	L	L	D	W	W	W	L	L	D	W	D	W	W	D	L	W	L	L	L
Position	12	3	1	1	1	1	1	2	2	2	2	2	2	2	2	2	3	3	3	3	3	3	3	3	3	3	3	3	3	3	3	3	3	3

Source: ForaDeJogo
A = Away; H = Home; W = Win; D = Draw; L = Loss

==== Matches ====
25 August 1996 1	Benfica	1–1	Braga	Lisbon
19:30	Hélder 82' (pen.)	Report	84' Idalécio; (yellow card) 35' (yellow-red card) 55' Rodrigão	Stadium: Estádio da Luz; Attendance: 40,000; Referee: José Rufino

7 September 1996 2	Gil Vicente	0–3	Benfica	Póvoa de Varzim
20:00		Report	Hélder 28'; Donizete 73', 79' (yellow card) 71' (yellow-red card) 89'	Stadium: Estádio do Varzim; Attendance: 25,000; Referee: Paulo Paraty

15 September 1996 3	Benfica	5–1	Vitória Setúbal	Lisbon
19:30	Bruno Caires 28'; João Pinto 39'; Hassan 49'; Panduru 83'; Luís Gustavo 85'	Report	Paulo Ribeiro 82'	Stadium: Estádio da Luz; Attendance: 25,000; Referee: José Leirós

22 September 1996 4	União de Leiria	0–2	Benfica	Leiria
20:30		Report	Panduru 74'; Donizete 87'	Stadium: Estádio Dr. Magalhães Pessoa; Attendance: 15,000; Referee: Paulo Costa

30 September 1996 5	Benfica	3–0	Desp. Chaves	Lisbon
19:30	Valdo 16'; Hélder 86'; Donizete 89'	Report		Stadium: Estádio da Luz; Attendance: 30,000; Referee: Soares Dias

13 October 1996 6	Salgueiros	0–1	Benfica	Porto
21:15		Report	Donizete 23'	Stadium: Estádio Prof. Dr. José Vieira de Carvalho; Attendance: 12,000; Referee: Monteiro da Silva

21 October 1996 7	Benfica	2–0	Estrela da Amadora	Lisbon
18:15	João Pinto 2'; Donizete 77'	Report	Jordão (yellow card) 37' (yellow-red card) 57'	Stadium: Estádio da Luz; Attendance: 15,000; Referee: António Costa

26 October 1996 8	Sporting	1–0	Benfica	Lisbon
21:30	Beto 51'	Report	Jamir (yellow card) 34' (yellow-red card) 62'; Tahar El Khalej (yellow card) 42' (yellow-red card) 81'	Stadium: Estádio de Alvalade; Attendance: 25,000; Referee: Vitor Pereira

4 November 1996 9	Benfica	1–1	Boavista	Lisbon
20:45	Iliev 30'; João Pinto (red card) 80'	Report	Hélder (yellow card) 36' (yellow-red card) 54'; Jimmy Hasselbaink 85'	Stadium: Estádio da Luz; Attendance: 25,000; Referee: Isidoro Rodrigues

16 November 1996 10	Espinho	0–3	Benfica	Porto
17:00		Report	Iliev 10'; Valdo 85'; Luís Gustavo 89'	Stadium: Estádio Prof. Dr. José Vieira de Carvalho; Attendance: 4,000; Referee: Augusto Duarte

24 November 1996 11	Benfica	2–1	Farense	Lisbon
20:00	Valdo 44' (pen.); Iliev 50'; Hélder Cristóvão (yellow card) 44' (yellow-red card) 83'	Report	Dos Santos 60'	Stadium: Estádio da Luz; Attendance: 20,000; Referee: Paulo Paraty

30 November 1996 12	Rio Ave	0–1	Benfica	Vila do Conde
20:15		Report	Bermúdez 24'; Pedro Henriques (yellow card) 58' (yellow-red card) 72'	Stadium: Estádio do Rio Ave FC; Attendance: 10,000; Referee: Martins dos Santos

22 December 1996 13	Benfica	0–0	Maritimo	Lisbon
21:15		Report		Stadium: Estádio da Luz; Attendance: 15,000; Referee: Luís Miranda

3 January 1997 14	Leça	1–5	Benfica	Leça da Palmeira
19:00	Zé da Rocha 90'	Report	Donizete 5'; João Pinto 13'; Martin Pringle 35', 56'; Pedro Henriques 48'	Stadium: Estádio do Leça FC; Attendance: 5,000; Referee: José Pratas

11 January 1997 15	Benfica	1–2	Porto	Lisbon
20:00	João Pinto 50'	Report	Mário Jardel 24'; Jorge Costa 57'	Stadium: Estádio da Luz; Attendance: 75,000; Referee: Lucílio Baptista

19 January 1997 16	Vitória Guimarães	1–0	Benfica	Guimarães
19:00	Quim Berto 9' (pen.); João Pinto (yellow card) 23' (yellow-red card) 68'	Report		Stadium: Estádio D. Afonso Henriques; Attendance: 20,000; Referee: Bento Marques

25 January 1997 17	Benfica	1–2	Belenenses	Lisbon
19:00	Bruno Caires 49'	Report	Paulo Fonseca 6'; Bermúdez 30' (o.g.)	Stadium: Estádio da Luz; Attendance: 5,000; Referee: Paulo Paraty

1 February 1997 18	Braga	1–1	Benfica	Braga
20:30	Zé Nuno Azevedo 39'; Mozer (yellow card) 29' (yellow-red card) 73'	Report	Glenn Helder 28'	Stadium: Estádio 1º de Maio; Attendance: 10,000; Referee: Paulo Costa

8 February 1997 19	Benfica	1–0	Gil Vicente	Lisbon
19:00	Martin Pringle 80'	Report	Carlitos (yellow card) 70' (yellow-red card) 72'	Stadium: Estádio da Luz; Attendance: 10,000; Referee: Soares Dias

15 February 1997 20	Vitória de Setúbal	0–2	Benfica	Porto
20:30		Report	Jamir 17'; Edgar Pacheco 74'	Stadium: Estádio das Antas; Attendance: 15,000; Referee: Augusto Duarte

23 February 1997 21	Benfica	1–0	União de Leiria	Lisbon
20:30	Edgar Pacheco 60'	Report		Stadium: Estádio da Luz; Attendance: 15,000; Referee: Paulo Baptista

1 March 1997 22	Desp. Chaves	3–1	Benfica	Chaves
21:15	Miner 24'; Dani Diaz 55'; Milinković 84'	Report	Jorge Soares 48'	Stadium: Estádio Municipal de Chaves; Attendance: 6,000; Referee: Paulo Paraty

16 March 1997 23	Benfica	3–4	Salgueiros	Lisbon
19:00	Edgar 14'; Tahar 63'; João Pinto 82'	Report	Abílio 36'; Nandinho 62'; Marcos Severo 89', 90'	Stadium: Estádio da Luz; Attendance: 15,000; Referee: Francisco Ferreira

24 March 1997 24	Estrela da Amadora	1–1	Benfica	Lisbon
20:00	Gaúcho 39'	Report	João Pinto 89'	Stadium: Estádio da Reboleira; Attendance: 6,000; Referee: Paulo Costa

4 April 1997 25	Benfica	1–0	Sporting	Lisbon
20:00	João Pinto 15'	Report	Pedro Barbosa (red card) 74'	Stadium: Estádio da Luz; Attendance: 25,000; Referee: Pinto Correia

12 April 1997 26	Boavista	1–1	Benfica	Porto
20:00	Jimmy Hasselbaink 5'	Report	Valdir 89'	Stadium: Estádio do Bessa; Attendance: 8,000; Referee: José Leirós

20 April 1997 27	Benfica	2–0	Espinho	Lisbon
20:30	Valdir 13'; Valdo 64' (pen.)	Report	Carvalhal (yellow card) 8' (yellow-red card) 56'; Lino (red card) 63'	Stadium: Estádio da Luz; Attendance: 15,000; Referee: José Pratas

26 April 1997 28	Farense	1–2	Benfica	Faro
20:30	Dragan Punišić 9'; Paixão (yellow card) 60' (yellow-red card) 83'	Report	Valdir 23'; Edgar Pacheco 76'	Stadium: Estádio de São Luís; Attendance: 14,000; Referee: Isidoro Rodrigues

4 May 1997 29	Benfica	0–0	Rio Ave	Lisbon
19:00		Report		Stadium: Estádio da Luz; Attendance: 50,000; Referee: Pinto Correia

10 May 1997 30	Maritimo	2–0	Benfica	Funchal
19:00	Edmilson 41', 65'	Report	João Pinto (yellow card) 55' (yellow-red card) 72'	Stadium: Estádio dos Barreiros; Attendance: 5,000; Referee: Cunha Antunes

18 May 1997 31	Benfica	1–0	Leça	Lisbon
17:05	Jorge Soares 14'	Report		Stadium: Estádio da Luz; Attendance: 3,000; Referee: Soares Dias

24 May 1997 32	Porto	3–1	Benfica	Porto
20:30	Mário Jardel 57', 62'; Jorge Costa 76'	Report	Valdo 71' (pen.); Tahar El Khalej (yellow card) 52' (yellow-red card) 75'	Stadium: Estádio das Antas; Attendance: 45,000; Referee: António Costa

30 May 1997 33	Benfica	0–2	Vitória Guimarães	Campo Maior
19:00		Report	Vítor Paneira 63'; Quim Berto 89'	Stadium: Estádio Capitão Cesar Correia; Attendance: 30,000; Referee: José Leirós

15 June 1997 34	Belenenses	1–0	Benfica	Lisbon
21:00	Andrade 77'	Report		Stadium: Estádio do Restelo; Attendance: 2,000; Referee: Lucílio Baptista

=== Taça de Portugal ===
8 December 1996 Fourth Rd	Benfica	3–2 (a.e.t.)	Vitória Guimarães	Lisbon
18:00	Bermúdez 10'; João Pinto 32', 95'	Report	Capucho 38'; Alexandre 84'	Stadium: Estádio da Luz; Referee: Lucílio Baptista

11 February 1997 Fifth Rd	Benfica	2–1	Maritimo	Lisbon
20:30	Martin Pringle 44'; Valdo 82' (pen.)	Report	Carlos Jorge 56'	Stadium: Estádio da Luz; Referee: José Rufino

9 March 1997 Sixth Rd	Benfica	3–1 (a.e.t.)	Desp. Aves	Lisbon
20:30	João Pinto 87'; Valdo 100'; Nicǎ Panduru 108'	Report	Noverça 61'	Stadium: Estádio da Luz; Referee: António Rola

2 April 1997 Quarter-finals	Benfica	5–1	Dragões Sandinenses	Lisbon
20:30	João Pinto 12', 15', 89'; Marinho 20'; Valdir 82'	Report	Landu 54'	Stadium: Estádio da Luz; Referee: António Costa

30 April 1997 Semi-finals	Benfica	2–0	Porto	Lisbon
20:30	Valdir 28'; Edgar Pacheco 32'	Report		Stadium: Estádio da Luz; Referee: Lucílio Baptista

10 June 1997 Final	Boavista	3–2	Benfica	Lisbon
20:30	Erwin Sánchez 7', 58' (pen.); Nuno Gomes 28'	Report	Calado 35'; Paulo Jorge Sousa 60' (o.g.)	Stadium: Estádio Nacional; Referee: Paulo Paraty

=== UEFA Cup Winners' Cup ===
==== First round ====
12 September 1996 First leg	Benfica (Portugal)	5–1	(Poland) Ruch Chorzów	Lisbon
19:00	Donizete 25'; João Pinto 26'; Jamir 32'; Valdo 70', 90'	Report	Gęsior 73'	Stadium: Estádio da Luz; Attendance: 20,000; Referee: Hermann Albrecht

26 September 1996 Second leg	Ruch Chorzów (Poland)	0–0 (5–1 agg.)	(Portugal) Benfica	Chorzów
19:00		Report		Stadium: Stadion Ruchu; Referee: Mika Peltola

==== Second round ====
17 October 1996 First leg	Benfica (Portugal)	1–0	(Russia) Lokomotiv Moscow	Lisbon
19:00	João Pinto 8'	Report		Stadium: Estádio da Luz; Attendance: 20,000; Referee: Alain Sars

31 October 1996 Second leg	Lokomotiv Moscow (Russia)	2–3 (4–2 agg.)	(Portugal) Benfica	Moscow
19:00	Solomatin 9'; Haras 58'	Report	Panduru 47'; Donizete 63'; João Pinto 90'	Stadium: Lokomotiv Stadium; Referee: Knud Erik Fisker

==== Quarter-finals ====
6 March 1997 First leg	Benfica (Portugal)	0–2	(Italy) Fiorentina	Lisbon
19:00		Report	Baiano 45'; Batistuta 89'	Stadium: Estádio da Luz; Attendance: 20,000; Referee: Helmut Krug

20 March 1997 Second leg	Fiorentina (Italy)	0–1 (1–2 agg.)	(Portugal) Benfica	Florence
19:00		Report	Edgar 22'	Stadium: Stadio Artemio Franchi; Referee: Mario van der Ende

=== Friendlies ===
7 August 1996 Mario Cecchi Gori	Fiorentina	1–1 (8–9 p)	Benfica	Florence
	Luís Oliveira 42'		35' João Pinto	Stadium: Stadio Artemio Franchi

7 August 1996 Mario Cecchi Gori	Benfica	3–1	Arsenal	Florence
	Panduru 16'; Donizete 36'; Hassan 39'		33' John Hartson	Stadium: Stadio Artemio Franchi

10 August 1996	Coventry City	2–7	Benfica	Coventry
				Stadium: Highfield Road

27 August 1996 Santiago Bernabéu	Real Madrid	4–0	Benfica	Madrid
	Rául 2'; Šuker 15' (pen.); Victor 54'; Lasa 70'			Stadium: Santiago Bernabéu Stadium; Attendance: 35,000; Referee: Antonio Lopez Nieto

== Player statistics ==
The squad for the season consisted of the players listed in the tables below, as well as staff member Paulo Autuori (manager), Mário Wilson (manager) and Manuel José (manager).

Note 1: Note: Flags indicate national team as defined under FIFA eligibility rules. Players may hold more than one non-FIFA nationality.

Note 2: Players with squad numbers marked ‡ joined the club during the 1996-97 season via transfer, with more details in the following section.

No.	Pos	Nat	Player	Total		Primeira Divisão		Taça de Portugal		Supertaça		UEFA Cup Winners' Cup	
No.	Pos	Nat	Player	Apps	Goals	Apps	Goals	Apps	Goals	Apps	Goals	Apps	Goals
1	GK	(Belgium) BEL	Michel Preud'homme	47	-48	34	-30	5	-7	2	-6	6	-5
2^{‡}	DF	(Morocco) MAR	Tahar El Khalej	38	1	25	1	6	0	1	0	6	0
3^{‡}	DF	(Portugal) POR	Jorge Soares	28	2	20	2	6	0	0	0	2	0
4	DF	(Portugal) POR	Hélder Cristóvão	15	3	10	3	0	0	2	0	3	0
4^{‡}	DF	(Brazil) BRA	Ronaldo Guiaro	4	0	3	0	1	0	0	0	0	0
5^{‡}	DF	(Colombia) COL	Jorge Bermúdez	38	2	27	1	3	1	2	0	6	0
6^{‡}	MF	(Brazil) BRA	Jamir Gomes	21	2	12	1	1	0	2	0	6	1
8	MF	(Portugal) POR	João Vieira Pinto	42	16	28	7	6	6	2	0	6	3
9	FW	(Morocco) MAR	Hassan Nader	13	1	7	1	1	0	1	0	4	0
10	MF	(Brazil) BRA	Valdo Filho	43	9	30	5	6	2	2	0	5	2
11	MF	(Romania) ROU	Basarab Panduru	28	4	19	2	2	1	1	0	6	1
12	GK	(Portugal) POR	Fernando Brassard	1	-1	0	0	1	-1	0	0	0	0
13	DF	(Portugal) POR	Dimas Teixeira	13	0	8	0	0	0	2	0	3	0
13^{‡}	MF	(Portugal) POR	Tiago Pereira	22	0	19	0	3	0	0	0	0	0
14	DF	(Portugal) POR	Marinho	21	1	15	0	4	1	0	0	2	0
15	MF	(Angola) ANG	Paulão	7	0	5	0	0	0	0	0	2	0
16^{‡}	MF	(Brazil) BRA	Luís Gustavo	14	2	10	2	1	0	2	0	1	0
17	DF	(Portugal) POR	Pedro Henriques	26	1	21	1	3	0	0	0	2	0
18	FW	(Argentina) ARG	Mauro Airez	17	0	12	0	3	0	0	0	2	0
19	MF	(Portugal) POR	Bruno Caires	26	2	18	2	2	0	2	0	4	0
20	MF	(Bulgaria) BUL	Ilian Iliev	28	3	21	3	2	0	1	0	4	0
21^{‡}	FW	(Brazil) BRA	Valdir	13	5	10	3	3	2	0	0	0	0
21^{‡}	FW	(Brazil) BRA	Donizete	22	9	16	7	1	0	2	0	3	2
22	MF	(Portugal) POR	José Calado	35	1	24	0	5	1	2	0	4	0
23	MF	(Portugal) POR	Edgar Pacheco	23	6	15	4	5	1	0	0	3	1
24	FW	(Angola) ANG	Akwá	4	0	3	0	1	0	0	0	0	0
25^{‡}	FW	(Sweden) SWE	Martin Pringle	17	4	15	3	2	1	0	0	0	0
27	DF	(Portugal) POR	Nélson Veríssimo	1	0	1	0	0	0	0	0	0	0
28^{‡}	DF	(Morocco) MAR	Abdelkrim El Hadrioui	8	0	5	0	2	0	0	0	1	0
29^{‡}	MF	(Netherlands) NED	Glenn Helder	13	1	11	1	1	0	0	0	1	0
30^{‡}	MF	(Brazil) BRA	Amaral	24	0	19	0	5	0	0	0	0	0
34	MF	(Portugal) POR	Hugo Leal	2	0	2	0	0	0	0	0	0	0
35^{‡}	DF	(Brazil) BRA	Lúcio Wagner	3	0	2	0	1	0	0	0	0	0
37^{‡}	DF	(Portugal) POR	Nélson Morais	1	0	1	0	0	0	0	0	0	0

== Transfers ==
=== In ===
Entry date	Position	Player	From club
July 1996	CB	Jorge Soares	Farense
July 1996	CB	Tahar El Khalej	União Leiria
July 1996	CB	Jorge Bermúdez	América de Cali
July 1996	CM	Tiago Pereira	Marítimo
July 1996	ST	Donizete	Verdy Kawasaki
July 1996	CM	Luís Gustavo	Marítimo
July 1996	ST	Martin Pringle	Helsingborg
July 1996	CB	Ronaldo Guiaro	Atlético Mineiro
July 1996	DM	Jamir Gomes	Botafogo
January 1997	LB	Abdelkrim El Hadrioui	AS.FAR

=== In by loan ===
Entry date	Position	Player	From club	Return date
December 1996	LW	Glenn Helder	Arsenal	30 June 1997
January 1997	DM	Amaral	Parma	30 June 1997
March 1997	LB	Lúcio Wagner	Corinthians Alagoano	30 June 1997
March 1997	ST	Valdir	Atlético Mineiro	30 June 1997
March 1997	FB	Nélson Morais	Alverca	30 June 1997

=== Out ===
Exit date	Position	Player	To club
July 1996	CB	Ricardo Gomes	Retired
July 1996	GK	José Veiga	Alverca
July 1996	LB	Paulo Pereira	Genoa
July 1996	CB	King	Farense
July 1996	DM	Paulo Bento	Oviedo
July 1996	LB	Daniel Kenedy	Paris Saint-Germain
July 1996	FW	Luiz Gustavo	Internacional
July 1996	ST	Marcelo	Deportivo Alavés
January 1997	LB	Dimas	Juventus
January 1997	CB	Hélder	Deportivo
January 1997	ST	Donizete	Corinthians

=== Out by loan ===
Exit date	Position	Player	To club	Return date
July 1996	CM	Maniche	Alverca	30 June 1997
July 1996	CB	Paredão	Alverca	30 June 1997
