= 1996 Supertaça Cândido de Oliveira =

- Event: Supertaça Cândido de Oliveira (Portuguese Super Cup)
Benfica	Porto
0	6
- 0–6 on aggregate.

First leg
Benfica	Porto
0	1
- Date: 18 August 1996
- Venue: Estádio das Antas, Porto
- Referee: Lucílio Batista (Setúbal)

Second leg
Porto	Benfica
5	0
- Date: 18 September 1996
- Venue: Estádio da Luz, Lisbon
- Referee: António Rola (Santarém)

The 1996 Supertaça Cândido de Oliveira was the 18th edition of the Supertaça Cândido de Oliveira, the annual Portuguese football season-opening match contested by the winners of the previous season's top league and cup competitions (or cup runner-up in case the league- and cup-winning club is the same). The 1996 Supertaça Cândido de Oliveira was contested over two legs, and opposed Benfica and Porto of the Primeira Liga. Porto qualified for the SuperCup by winning the 1995–96 Primeira Divisão, whilst Benfica qualified for the Supertaça by winning the 1995–96 Taça de Portugal.

The first leg which took place at the Estádio das Antas, saw Porto defeat Benfica 1–0. The second leg which took place at the Estádio da Luz, saw the Dragões defeat the Encarnados comfortably with a 5–0 away win (6–0 on aggregate) which would grant the Portistas a ninth Supertaça.

== First leg ==
=== Details ===
18 August 1996

Porto	1–0	Benfica
Domingos 42'

Estádio das Antas, Porto
Referee: Lucílio Batista (Setúbal)

Porto	Benfica

GK	1	(Poland) Andrzej Woźniak
RB	22	(Portugal) Jorge Costa (c)	(yellow card) 65'
CB	4	(Brazil) Aloísio	(yellow card) 41'
LB	3	(Portugal) Rui Jorge
DM	17	(Portugal) José Barroso	(yellow card) 64'
CM	18	(Portugal) Bino	(yellow card) 71'
CM	20	(Portugal) Paulinho Santos	(yellow card) 52'
AM	21	(Brazil) Edmilson		(substituted off) 66'
RW	14	(Brazil) Artur
LW	11	(Federal Republic of Yugoslavia) Ljubinko Drulović
CF	9	(Portugal) Domingos
Substitutes:
MF	7	(Portugal) Sérgio Conceição		(substituted on) 66'
Manager:
(Portugal) António Oliveira

GK	1	(Belgium) Michel Preud'homme
RB	5	(Colombia) Jorge Bermúdez
CB	4	(Portugal) Hélder	(yellow card) 81'
LB	13	(Portugal) Dimas
DM	6	(Brazil) Jamir	(yellow card) 75'
CM	19	(Portugal) Bruno Caires		(substituted off) 82'
LM	22	(Portugal) José Calado	(yellow card) 50'
RM	10	(Brazil) Valdo
AM	8	(Portugal) João Pinto (c)	(yellow card) 62'
LM	11	(Romania) Basarab Panduru		(substituted off) 69'
CF	21	(Brazil) Donizete
Substitutes:
MF	16	(Brazil) Luís Gustavo		(substituted on) 69'
FW	9	(Morocco) Hassan Nader		(substituted on) 82'
Manager:
(Brazil) Paulo Autuori

Match officials

- Assistant referees:
- Fourth official:

Match rules

- 90 minutes.
- Maximum of three substitutions

== Second leg ==
=== Details ===
18 September 1996

Benfica	0–5	Porto
		Edmilson 3'; Artur 43'; J. Costa 46'; Wetl 56'; Drulović 85'

Estádio da Luz, Lisbon
Referee: António Rola (Santarém)

Benfica	Porto

GK	1	(Belgium) Michel Preud'homme
RB	5	(Colombia) Jorge Bermúdez
CB	4	(Portugal) Hélder
LB	13	(Portugal) Dimas		(substituted off) 50'
DM	6	(Brazil) Jamir	(yellow card) 50'
CM	19	(Portugal) Bruno Caires
LM	22	(Portugal) José Calado		(substituted off) 73'
RM	10	(Brazil) Valdo
AM	8	(Portugal) João Pinto (c)	(yellow card) 23'
LM	16	(Brazil) Luís Gustavo	(yellow card) 4'
CF	21	(Brazil) Donizete
Substitutes:
DF	2	(Morocco) Tahar El Khalej		(substituted on) 73'
MF	20	(Bulgaria) Ilian Iliev		(substituted on) 50'
Manager:
(Brazil) Paulo Autuori

GK	1	(Poland) Andrzej Woźniak
RB	19	(Portugal) João Manuel Pinto	(yellow card) 88'
CB	13	(Brazil) Lula	(yellow card) 61'
CB	22	(Portugal) Jorge Costa (c)
LB	5	(Portugal) Fernando Mendes
CM	6	(Austria) Arnold Wetl		(substituted off) 70'
CM	20	(Portugal) Paulinho Santos
RM	7	(Portugal) Sérgio Conceição
AM	21	(Brazil) Edmilson	(yellow card) 5'	(substituted off) 60'
LM	25	(Slovenia) Zlatko Zahovič
CF	14	(Brazil) Artur		(substituted off) 52'
Substitutes:
MF	8	(Portugal) Rui Barros		(substituted on) 70'
MF	11	(Federal Republic of Yugoslavia) Ljubinko Drulović		(substituted on) 52'
FW	16	(Brazil) Mário Jardel		(substituted on) 60'
Manager:
(Portugal) António Oliveira

1996 Supertaça Cândido de Oliveira Winners
Porto
9th Title

Match officials

- Assistant referees:
- Fourth official:

Match rules

- 90 minutes.
- Maximum of three substitutions

== See also ==
- O Clássico
- 1996–97 Primeira Divisão
- 1996–97 Taça de Portugal
- 1996–97 S.L. Benfica season
