= 1998–99 S.L. Benfica season =

Benfica
1998–99 season
- President: João Vale e Azevedo
- Head coach: Graeme Souness (until 3 May 1999); Shéu (caretaker for four matches)
- Stadium: Estádio da Luz
- Primeira Divisão: 3rd
- Taça de Portugal: Fifth round
- UEFA Champions League: Group stage (2nd)
- Top goalscorer: League: Nuno Gomes (24); All: Nuno Gomes (34)
- Highest home attendance: 80,000 v Boavista (14 March 1999)
- Lowest home attendance: 2,000 v Chaves (14 May 1999)
- Biggest win: Benfica 6–0 Beitar Jerusalem (12 August 1998)
- Biggest defeat: Benfica 0–3 Boavista (14 March 1999)
Home colours	Away colours

The 1998–99 European football season was the 95th season of Sport Lisboa e Benfica's existence and the club's 65th consecutive season in the top flight of Portuguese football. The season ran from 1 July 1998 to 30 June 1999; Benfica competed domestically in the Primeira Divisão and the Taça de Portugal. The club also participated in the UEFA Champions League as a result of finishing second in the Primeira Divisão in the previous season.

After guiding Benfica to second place, Graeme Souness remained in charge for a first full season. The Scottish brought in a handful of British players to the team, but only Michael Thomas, Mark Pembridge and Dean Saunders got regular playing time. To offset, Benfica lost the likes of Edgar Pacheco, Brian Deane and Scott Minto.

The season started with the qualifying rounds of the UEFA Champions League, which the club successfully passes, although not without drama. Domestically, Benfica fared better, quickly reaching the top spots by early October. However, a home draw with Alverca, starts a six-match winless spree that put them in fifth place in the league and negatively impacted their Champions League campaign.

Benfica eventually regained their step in the Primeira Divisão. From late November till early February, they won 8 out of 9 matches, including seven in a row. This allowed them to battle the second place with Boavista with a match between in 14 March assuming significant importance. Benfica lost and started another downward spiral of erratic results that eventually led to the dismissal of Souness. Long-time assistant Shéu finished the season, with Benfica reaching 65 points, 14 less than Porto. Nuno Gomes had its best season of his career, scoring 34 goals in all competitions.

== Season summary ==
Following a season, where Benfica made a convincing second round, collecting 41 out of 51 points. Souness had his status increased, with more influence on player signings and the technical staff around him. One of his first decisions was replacing Nelo Vingada by his personal friend, Phil Boersma. Vingada work as assistant was influential in helping Souness understand the intricacy of Portuguese football. The Scottish also brought in reinforcements from England, inspired by the effect that Poborský and Brian Deane had in the team, when they joined in January. After a pre-season that saw them meet Newcastle United, Sheffield United and Italians, Empoli and Lazio, the team was set to debut in the qualifying rounds of the Champions League against Beitar Jerusalem. With a six nil thrashing in the first leg, the second leg was a mere formality. However, in Israel, the team suffered a setback, conceding four goals, that although it did not harm progress to the group stage, it upset the management.

In the league, Benfica started in the best possible way, amassing three consecutive wins and reaching top of the table. A loss in Faro dropped them to second, but did not stop their momentum, as two more wins and a hard-fought draw against F.C. Alverca followed. Equal on the first place, the team visited Boavista next. A last minute goal from Martelinho forced Benfica to spend the week in fifth place. In Europe, the situation was not any better, with five points dropped against HJK Helsinki, who were making their debut in the group stage of the Champions League.

"An initial scare foresees an unsettling season. With the qualification for the millionaire Champions League almost assured, Benfica unexpectedly crashes in Israel for unthinkable numbers. Still, the Champions League is a reality – as his the ever present controversy caused by Souness. His signings – Michael Thomas and Mark Pembridge in July, Dean Saunders in January, Steve Harkness and Gary Charles in March – rarely ever get it right. Adding to this, the problems with the players are recurring and successive examples of stubbornness force him out, after a home draw against Campomaiorense. By then, Champions League, Portuguese League and Portuguese Cup were a thing of the past. Till the end, it is Shéu who leads the team, and holds on to the third place with a draw in the last match-day..."

— Rui Miguel Tovar on the season events

After five points earned in three match days in early November, the team faced FC Porto for the Clássico on the road, losing for a fifth consecutive season, and ending up in fifth place with a seven-point gap for the leader. In Europe, Benfica finished second in his group, with another late goal costing them points, now against PSV Eindhoven. Nonetheless, with the advancing season, Benfica performance improved, starting a seven-game winning streak that spread two months, and saw the jump to second, only a point behind leaders Porto. They were stopped in late January, when S.C. Beira-Mar draw them at home.

In February the team conceded a fourth league loss, which was followed by the premature exit of the Portuguese Cup. Still, they recovered by winning the two subsequent games, matching Boavista on the league table, and facing them next, knowing that a win, would put the team one point behind leaders Porto. On 14 March, Souness decided to Gary Charles and Steve Harkness, the first was coming out of an injury and the second arrived days before. Benfica lost 0–3, dropped to third place and Souness saw his first handkerchiefs. A week later Benfica draw against U.D. Leiria, bagging only one point out of six possible in a crucial part of the season.

April would be much the same, with five points lost out of nine possible, the advantage over the fourth place, Sporting was reduced to two points. With a home draw against S.C. Campomaiorense in early May, and in danger of losing the third place, Souness was sacked with immediate effect. He was banned from entering the stadium, and Shéu replaced him in the final four matches, winning seven points out of twelve, but more importantly, securing the third place.

== Competitions ==
Win Draw Loss Postponed

=== Overall record ===
Competition	First match	Last match	Record								
Competition	First match	Last match	G	W	D	L	GF	GA	GD	Win %	Source
Primeira Divisão	21 August 1998	30 May 1999	34	19	8	7	71	29	+42	55.88	
Taça de Portugal	10 January 1999	16 February 1999	2	1	0	1	4	3	+1	50.00	
UEFA Champions League	12 August 1998	9 December 1998	8	4	2	2	16	13	+3	50.00	
Total			44	23	10	11	91	45	+46	52.27	

=== Primeira Divisão ===
==== League table ====
Pos	Team	Pld	W	D	L	GF	GA	GD	Pts	Qualification or relegation
1	Porto (C)	34	24	7	3	85	26	+59	79	Qualification to Champions League group stage
2	Boavista	34	20	11	3	57	29	+28	71	Qualification to Champions League third qualifying round
3	Benfica	34	19	8	7	71	29	+42	65	Qualification to UEFA Cup first round
4	Sporting CP	34	17	12	5	64	32	+32	63	Qualification to UEFA Cup first round
5	Vitória de Setúbal	34	15	8	11	37	38	−1	53	Qualification to UEFA Cup first round

Source: Primeira Divisão
Rules for classification: 1st points, 2nd head-to-head, 3rd goals average
(C) Champions

==== Results by round ====
Round	1	2	3	4	5	6	7	8	9	10	11	12	13	14	15	16	17	18	19	20	21	22	23	24	25	26	27	28	29	30	31	32	33	34
Ground	H	A	H	A	H	A	H	A	H	A	H	A	A	H	A	H	A	A	H	A	H	A	H	A	H	A	H	A	H	H	A	H	A	H
Result	W	W	W	L	W	W	D	L	D	D	W	L	W	W	W	W	W	W	W	D	W	L	W	W	L	D	W	L	D	D	L	W	W	D
Position	4	1	1	2	2	2	1	5	5	4	4	5	4	4	4	3	2	2	2	3	2	3	3	2	3	3	3	3	3	3	4	3	3	3

Source: FootballPortugal
A = Away; H = Home; W = Win; D = Draw; L = Loss

==== Matches ====
21 August 1998 1	Benfica	2–0	Estrela da Amadora	Lisbon
18:15	Poborský 16'; Tahar 72'	Report		Stadium: Estádio da Luz; Attendance: 40,000; Referee: Isidoro Rodrigues

30 August 1998 2	Rio Ave	0–2	Benfica	Vila do Conde
20:15		Report	Nuno Gomes 70' (pen.), 85'	Stadium: Estádio do Rio Ave FC; Attendance: 20,000; Referee: José Pratas

12 September 1998 3	Benfica	3–0	Beira-Mar	Lisbon
17:00	Martin Pringle 15'; Luís Carlos 25'; Ronaldo 54'	Report		Stadium: Estádio da Luz; Attendance: 30,000; Referee: Vítor Pereira

21 September 1998 4	Farense	1–0	Benfica	Faro
20:30	Hassan Nader 90'; Miguel Serôdio (red card) 85'	Report		Stadium: Estádio de São Luís; Attendance: 9,000; Referee: Jorge Coroado

26 September 1998 5	Benfica	3–1	Maritimo	Lisbon
21:15	Nuno Gomes 32' (pen.), 59', 90' (pen.)	Report	Herivelto 22'; Jokanović (yellow card) 37' (yellow-red card) 50'	Stadium: Estádio da Luz; Attendance: 10,000; Referee: António Costa

4 October 1998 6	Vitória Guimarães	0–2	Benfica	Guimarães
19:00		Report	Alexandre 2' (o.g.); Kandaurov 70'	Stadium: Estádio D. Afonso Henriques; Attendance: 10,000; Referee: Paulo Costa

17 October 1998 7	Benfica	2–2	Alverca	Lisbon
19:00	Poborský 12'; Bruno Basto (yellow card) 42' (yellow-red card) 73'; Nandinho 89'	Report	Marco Freitas 44'; Maniche 81'	Stadium: Estádio da Luz; Attendance: 25,000; Referee: Emanuel Camâra

25 October 1998 8	Boavista	2–1	Benfica	Porto
20:00	Timofte 49' (pen.); Martelinho 89'	Report	Nuno Gomes 50'; Poborský (red card) 86'	Stadium: Estádio do Bessa; Attendance: 8,000; Referee: Lucílio Baptista

1 November 1998 9	Benfica	0–0	União Leiria	Lisbon
20:05	José Calado (yellow card) 65' (yellow-red card) 80'	Report		Stadium: Estádio da Luz; Attendance: 30,000; Referee: António Costa

10 November 1998 10	Salgueiros	1–1	Benfica	Porto
21:15	Reis 90'	Report	João Pinto 49'; Luís Andrade (yellow card) 83' (yellow-red card) 90'	Stadium: Estádio Prof. Dr. José Vieira de Carvalho; Attendance: 6,000; Referee: Paulo Costa

15 November 1998 11	Benfica	4–1	Braga	Lisbon
19:30	Kandaurov 3'; Poborský 33'; João Pinto 57'; Nuno Gomes 89'	Report	Odair 13'	Stadium: Estádio da Luz; Attendance: 3,000; Referee: Mário Mendes

21 November 1998 12	Porto	3–1	Benfica	Porto
20:30	Chaínho 18'; Jardel 39', 54'	Report	Kandaurov 57'; João Pinto (yellow card) 66' (yellow-red card) 76'	Stadium: Estádio das Antas; Attendance: 45,000; Referee: José Pratas

29 November 1998 13	Campomaiorense	0–5	Benfica	Campo Maior, Portalegre
20:30		Report	Nuno Gomes 25', 76' (pen.); Hugo Leal 43', 44'; Michael Thomas (yellow card) 37' (yellow-red card) 55'; Kandaurov 75'	Stadium: Estádio Capitão Cesar Correia; Attendance: 7,000; Referee: Vítor Pereira

4 December 1998 14	Benfica	2–0	Vitória Setúbal	Lisbon
19:30	Pembridge 4'; Nuno Gomes 47'	Report	Pedro Henriques (yellow card) 77' (yellow-red card) 83'	Stadium: Estádio da Luz; Attendance: 20,000; Referee: Lucílio Baptista

14 September 1998 15	Desp. Chaves	0–4	Benfica	Chaves
21:15	Filipe (yellow card) 35' (yellow-red card) 38'; Neves (yellow card) 49' (yellow-red card) 58'	Report	Nuno Gomes 9', 27', 68'; Tahar 48'	Stadium: Estádio Municipal de Chaves; Attendance: 3,000

20 December 1998 16	Benfica	3–0	Académica	Lisbon
17:00	Poborský 30'; Nuno Gomes 55', 61'	Report		Stadium: Estádio da Luz; Attendance: 45,000; Referee: Bentua Marques

3 January 1999 17	Sporting	1–2	Benfica	Lisbon
21:30	Delfim 81'	Report	Beto 27', 79' (o.g.)	Stadium: Estádio de Alvalade; Attendance: 45,000; Referee: Martins dos Santos

16 January 1999 18	Estrela da Amadora	0–1	Benfica	Lisbon
20:00		Report	Dean Saunders 87'	Stadium: Estádio da Reboleira; Attendance: 5,000; Referee: Vítor Pereira

23 January 1999 19	Benfica	3–1	Rio Ave	Lisbon
19:00	Nuno Gomes 48'; Cadete 81'; Pepa 90'	Report	André Jacaré 58'	Stadium: Estádio da Luz; Attendance: 30,000; Referee: Francisco Vicente

29 January 1999 20	Beira-Mar	1–1	Benfica	Aveiro
19:30	Gila 47'	Report	Tahar 57'	Stadium: Estádio Mário Duarte; Attendance: 15,000; Referee: António Costa

5 February 1999 21	Benfica	5–0	Farense	Lisbon
20:00	Dean Saunders 23', 45'; King 51' (o.g.); Nuno Gomes 73', 88'	Report		Stadium: Estádio da Luz; Attendance: 20,000; Referee: Luís Miranda

13 February 1999 22	Maritimo	1–0	Benfica	Funchal
19:00	Tulipa 46'	Report		Stadium: Estádio dos Barreiros; Attendance: 10,000; Referee: Martins dos Santos

21 February 1999 23	Benfica	3–1	Vitória Guimarães	Lisbon
19:00	João Pinto 27'; Thomas 66'; Nuno Gomes 87'	Report	Edmilson 15'	Stadium: Estádio da Luz; Attendance: 25,000; Referee: Paulo Baptista

28 February 1999 24	Alverca	0–2	Benfica	Alverca
18:00	Hugo Costa (yellow card) 50' (yellow-red card) 73'	Report	Dean Saunders 44'; Paulo Madeira 75'	Stadium: Complexo Desportivo do Alverca; Attendance: 5,000; Referee: Isidoro Rodrigues

14 March 1999 25	Benfica	0–3	Boavista	Lisbon
20:45		Report	Ayew 6', 66'; Mário Silva (yellow card) 23' (yellow-red card) 78'; Luís Manuel 89'	Stadium: Estádio da Luz; Attendance: 80,000; Referee: Vítor Pereira

21 March 1999 26	União Leiria	1–1	Benfica	Leiria
21:00	Sérgio Nunes 89'	Report	João Pinto 46'	Stadium: Estádio Dr. Magalhães Pessoa; Attendance: 10,000; Referee: Lucílio Baptista

3 April 1999 27	Benfica	5–0	Salgueiros	Lisbon
19:00	Charles 66'; Dean Saunders 71'; Ronaldo 83'; Nuno Gomes 87' (pen.), 89'	Report	Ademir (yellow card) 55' (yellow-red card) 70'	Stadium: Estádio da Luz; Attendance: 15,000; Referee: Bento Marques

17 April 1999 28	Braga	2–1	Benfica	Braga
20:30	Toni 7'; Odair 87'	Report	Paulo Madeira 62'	Stadium: Estádio 1º de Maio; Attendance: 10,000; Referee: Isidoro Rodrigues

24 April 1999 29	Benfica	1–1	Porto	Lisbon
20:00	Bruno Basto 48'	Report	Zlatko Zahovič 40'	Stadium: Estádio da Luz; Attendance: 40,000; Referee: João Esteves

2 May 1999 30	Benfica	1–1	Campomaiorense	Lisbon
20:00	Cadete 55'	Report	Welington 71'	Stadium: Estádio da Luz; Attendance: 10,000; Referee: Mário Mendes

10 May 1999 31	Vitória de Setúbal	1–0	Benfica	Setúbal
20:30	Toñito 12'	Report	Bruno Basto (red card) 88'	Stadium: Estádio do Bonfim; Attendance: 8,000; Referee: Lucílio Baptista

14 May 1999 32	Benfica	4–1	Desp. Chaves	Lisbon
19:30	Tahar 43'; Cadete 47'; Poborský 78'; Nuno Gomes 89'	Report	Carlos Álvarez 65'; André (red card) 87'	Stadium: Estádio da Luz; Attendance: 2,000; Referee: António Marçal

23 May 1999 33	Académica	0–3	Benfica	Coimbra
20:30		Report	Nuno Gomes 7'; Mounir 40' (o.g.); Hugo Leal 81'	Stadium: Estádio Cidade de Coimbra; Attendance: 4,000; Referee: Bento Marques

30 May 1999 34	Benfica	3–3	Sporting	Lisbon
20:00	Kandaurov 9'; Poborský 29'; Bruno Basto (yellow card) 35' (yellow-red card) 61'; Nuno Gomes 86'	Report	Iordanov 5', 38'; Marcos (yellow card) 14' (yellow-red card) 59'; Rui Jorge 75'	Stadium: Estádio da Luz; Attendance: 50,000; Referee: Paulo Paraty

=== Taça de Portugal ===
10 January 1999 Fourth Rd	Benfica	4–1	Académica	Lisbon
18:00	Nuno Gomes 2', 14', 50'; Calado 52'		Dário Monteiro 79'	Stadium: Estádio da Luz; Attendance: 10,000; Referee: Paulo Baptista

16 February 1999 Fifth Rd	Vitória de Setúbal	2–0	Benfica	Setúbal
20:30	Chiquinho Conde 16'; Chipenda 89'			Stadium: Estádio do Bonfim; Referee: Isidoro Rodrigues

=== UEFA Champions League ===
==== Second qualifying round ====
12 August 1998 First Leg	Benfica (Portugal)	6–0	(Israel) Beitar Jerusalem	Lisbon
19:00	Pembridge 25', 82'; Deane 29'; Calado 64'; Shelah 79' (o.g.); Nuno Gomes 85'			Stadium: Estádio da Luz; Attendance: 55,000; Referee: Edgar Steinborn

26 August 1998 Second Leg	Beitar Jerusalem (Israel)	4–2 (4–8 agg.)	(Portugal) Benfica	Jerusalem
19:00	Hamar 25'; Sallói 27' (pen.); Shitrit 51'; Ilan Bakhar (red card) 57'; Abukasis 80'		Nuno Gomes 17' (pen.); João Pinto 90'	Stadium: Teddy Stadium; Attendance: 1,300; Referee: Ryszard Wójcik

==== Group stage ====
Team	Pld	W	D	L	GF	GA	GD	Pts
(Germany) Kaiserslautern	6	4	1	1	12	6	+6	13
(Portugal) Benfica	6	2	2	2	8	9	−1	8
(Netherlands) PSV Eindhoven	6	2	1	3	10	11	−1	7
(Finland) HJK Helsinki	6	1	2	3	8	12	−4	5

16 September 1998 1	Kaiserslautern (Germany)	1–0	(Portugal) Benfica	Kaiserslautern
19:00	Wagner 41'	Report	Tahar El Khalej (red card) 87'	Stadium: Fritz-Walter-Stadion; Attendance: 31,000; Referee: Pierluigi Collina (Italy)

30 September 1998 2	Benfica (Portugal)	2–1	(Netherlands) PSV Eindhoven	Lisbon
19:00	Nuno Gomes 47'; João Pinto 76'	Report	Rommedahl 72'	Stadium: Estádio da Luz; Attendance: 45,000; Referee: Nikolai Levnikov (Russia)

21 October 1998 3	HJK Helsinki (Finland)	2–0	(Portugal) Benfica	Helsinki
19:00	Lehkosuo 20' (pen.); Kottila 70'	Report		Stadium: Olympic Stadium; Attendance: 25.126; Referee: Václav Krondl (Czech Republic)

4 November 1998 4	Benfica (Portugal)	2–2	(Finland) HJK Helsinki	Lisbon
19:00	Nuno Gomes 78'; Calado 81'	Report	Minto 5' (o.g.); Luiz Antônio 84'	Stadium: Estádio da Luz; Attendance: 25,000; Referee: Laszlo Vagner (Hungary)

25 November 1998 5	Benfica (Portugal)	2–1	(Germany) Kaiserslautern	Lisbon
19:00	Nuno Gomes 30'; João Pinto 70'	Report	Rische 90'	Stadium: Estádio da Luz; Attendance: 25,000; Referee: Paul Durkin (England)

9 December 1998 6	PSV Eindhoven (Netherlands)	2–2	(Portugal) Benfica	Eindhoven
19:00	Khokhlov 41' van Nistelrooy 89'	Report	Nuno Gomes 47' (pen.), 65'	Stadium: Philips Stadion; Attendance: 17,900; Referee: Karl-Erik Nilsson (Sweden)

=== Friendlies ===
1 August 1998 JD Sports Cup	Newcastle United	0–0 (3–4 p)	Benfica	Middlesbrough
				Stadium: Riverside Stadium; Attendance: 5,430
	Penalties
	Watson (penalty scored); Pearce (penalty scored); Ketsbaia (penalty scored)		Paulo Madeira (penalty scored); Scott Minto (penalty missed); Nandinho (penalty scored); Kandaurov (penalty scored); Luís Carlos (penalty scored)

2 August 1998 JD Sports Cup	Benfica	1–1 (7–6 p)	Empoli F.C.	Middlesbrough
	Nuno Gomes 49' (pen.)	Report	Palumbo 55'	Stadium: Riverside Stadium

4 August 1998	Sheffield United	1–3	Benfica	Sheffield
				Stadium: Bramall Lane

7 August 1998	Benfica	4–0	Lazio	Lisbon
	Nuno Gomes 7'; Karel Poborský 22'; Brian Deane 67'; Hugo Porfírio 90'			Stadium: Estádio da Luz; Attendance: 40,000; Referee: Jorge Coroado

6 September 1998	MetroStars	1–3	Benfica	East Rutherford, New Jersey
				Stadium: Giants Stadium

6 November 1998	New England Revolution	1–2	Benfica	Greater Boston
				Stadium: Gillette Stadium

10 April 1999 Taça Amizade	Benfica	3–2	Club Brugge	Paris
				Stadium: Parc des Princes

== Player statistics ==
The squad for the season consisted of the players listed in the tables below, as well as staff member Graeme Souness (manager), Phil Boersma (assistant manager) and Shéu (assistant and later manager).

Note 1: Note: Flags indicate national team as defined under FIFA eligibility rules. Players may hold more than one non-FIFA nationality.

Note 2: Players with squad numbers marked ‡ joined the club during the 1998-99 season via transfer, with more details in the following section.

No.	Pos	Nat	Player	Total		Primeira Divisão		Taça de Portugal		UEFA Champions League	
No.	Pos	Nat	Player	Apps	Goals	Apps	Goals	Apps	Goals	Apps	Goals
1	GK	(Belgium) BEL	Michel Preud'homme	27	-31	21	-21	0	0	6	-10
2	DF	(Morocco) MAR	Tahar El Khalej	28	4	22	4	2	0	4	0
3^{‡}	DF	(England) ENG	Gary Charles	4	1	4	1	0	0	0	0
5	DF	(Portugal) POR	Paulo Madeira	36	2	28	2	2	0	6	0
6^{‡}	DF	(England) ENG	Steve Harkness	9	0	9	0	0	0	0	0
7	MF	(Czech Republic) CZE	Karel Poborský	36	6	27	6	1	0	8	0
8	MF	(Portugal) POR	João Pinto	36	7	28	4	1	0	7	3
9^{‡}	FW	(Portugal) POR	Nandinho	4	1	4	1	0	0	0	0
10^{‡}	FW	(Wales) WAL	Dean Saunders	19	5	17	5	2	0	0	0
11	FW	(Sweden) SWE	Martin Pringle	19	1	12	1	0	0	7	0
12	GK	(Russia) RUS	Sergei Ovchinnikov	18	-18	14	-12	2	-3	2	-3
13	DF	(Brazil) BRA	Ronaldo Guiaro	40	2	30	2	2	0	8	0
14	DF	(Portugal) POR	José Sousa	15	0	10	0	0	0	5	0
15^{‡}	MF	(Wales) WAL	Mark Pembridge	28	3	19	1	1	0	8	2
16	DF	(England) ENG	Scott Minto	17	0	10	0	1	0	6	0
17	MF	(Ukraine) UKR	Serhiy Kandaurov	27	5	22	5	2	0	3	0
18	FW	(Portugal) POR	Jorge Cadete	17	3	16	3	1	0	0	0
19^{‡}	DF	(Portugal) POR	Bruno Basto	22	1	18	1	1	0	3	0
20	MF	(Portugal) POR	Hugo Leal	35	3	27	3	2	0	6	0
21	FW	(Portugal) POR	Nuno Gomes	43	34	34	24	2	3	7	7
22	MF	(Portugal) POR	José Calado	33	3	24	0	2	1	7	2
23^{‡}	MF	(Portugal) POR	Hugo Porfírio	6	0	3	0	0	0	3	0
24	GK	(Portugal) POR	Paulo Lopes	0	0	0	0	0	0	0	0
26	MF	(Portugal) POR	Luís Carlos	21	1	19	1	2	0	0	0
28	FW	(England) ENG	Brian Deane	7	1	4	0	0	0	3	1
30^{‡}	MF	(Portugal) POR	Luís Andrade	15	0	12	0	0	0	3	0
31	FW	(Portugal) POR	Pepa	2	1	2	1	0	0	0	0
33^{‡}	MF	(England) ENG	Michael Thomas	25	1	18	1	1	0	6	0

== Transfers ==
=== In ===
Entry date	Position	Player	From club	Fee	Ref
1 July 1998	DM	Luís Andrade	Belenenses	Undisclosed	
1 July 1998	RW	Nandinho	Salgueiros	Undisclosed	
1 July 1998	DM	Marco Freitas	Vitória Guimarães	Free	
1 July 1998	DM	Michael Thomas	Liverpool	Free	
1 July 1998	LW	Mark Pembridge	Sheffield Wednesday	Free	
1 July 1998	LW	Hugo Porfírio	Racing Santander	Undisclosed	
8 December 1998	ST	Dean Saunders	Sheffield United	Undisclosed	
16 December 1998	FW	Jorge Cadete	Celta de Vigo	Undisclosed	
1 January 1999	LB	Bruno Basto	Alverca	Loan return	
14 January 1999	RB	Gary Charles	Aston Villa	Undisclosed	
9 March 1999	LB	Steve Harkness	Liverpool	Undisclosed	

=== Out ===
Exit date	Position	Player	To club	Fee	Ref
1 July 1998	RW	Edgar Pacheco	Real Madrid	Free	
1 July 1998	CB	Jorge Soares	Marítimo	Free	
1 July 1998	LB	Abdelkrim El Hadrioui	AZ Alkmaar	Undisclosed	
1 July 1998	DM	Tiago Pereira	Rayo Vallecano	Undisclosed	
1 July 1998	AM	Basarab Panduru	Porto	Free	
1 July 1998	AM	Deco	Salgueiros	Undisclosed	
12 October 1998	ST	Brian Deane	Middlesbrough	Undisclosed	
1 January 1999	DM	Jamir Gomes	Alverca	Undisclosed	
14 January 1999	LB	Scott Minto	West Ham United	Undisclosed	
4 March 1999	ST	Martin Pringle	Charlton Athletic	Undisclosed	

=== Out by loan ===
Exit date	Position	Player	To club	Return date	Ref
1 July 1998	CB	José Soares	Alverca	30 June 1999	
1 July 1998	DM	Marco Freitas	Alverca	30 June 1999	
1 July 1998	DM	Amaral	Corinthians	30 June 1999	
1 July 1998	AM	Erwin Sánchez	Boavista	30 June 1999	
1 January 1999	RW	Nandinho	Alverca	30 June 1999	
8 January 1999	ST	Martin Pringle	Charlton Athletic	1 March 1999	
