= 1997 Taça de Portugal final =

- Event: 1996–97 Taça de Portugal
| Benfica | Boavista |
| 2 | 3 |
- Date: 10 June 1997
- Venue: Estádio Nacional, Oeiras
- Man of the Match: Erwin Sánchez
- Referee: Paulo Paraty (Porto)

The 1997 Taça de Portugal final was the final match of the 1996–97 Taça de Portugal, the 57th season of the Taça de Portugal, the premier Portuguese football cup competition organized by the Portuguese Football Federation (FPF). The match was played on 10 June 1997 at the Estádio Nacional in Oeiras, and opposed two Primeira Liga sides Benfica and Boavista. Boavista defeated Benfica 3–2 to claim the Taça de Portugal for a fifth time in their history.

In Portugal, the final was televised live on RTP. As a result of Boavista winning the Taça de Portugal, Os Axadrezados qualified for the 1997 Supertaça Cândido de Oliveira where they took on 1996–97 Primeira Divisão winners Porto.

== Match ==
=== Details ===
10 June 1997
17:00 WEST

| Benfica | 2–3 | Boavista |
|---|---|---|
| Calado 35'; El Hadrioui 61' | | Sánchez 8', 59' (pen.); Nuno Gomes 28' |

Estádio Nacional, Oeiras
Referee: Paulo Paraty (Porto)

| Benfica | Boavista |

| GK | 1 | (Belgium) Michel Preud'homme |
| RB | 14 | (Portugal) Marinho | | (substituted off) 45' |
| CB | 2 | (Morocco) Tahar El Khalej | | (substituted off) 45' |
| CB | 3 | (Portugal) Jorge Soares |
| LB | 28 | (Morocco) Abdelkrim El Hadrioui |
| CM | 22 | (Portugal) José Calado |
| CM | 30 | (Brazil) Amaral | (yellow card) 28' |
| CM | 23 | (Portugal) Edgar |
| RM | 10 | (Brazil) Valdo |
| LM | 8 | (Portugal) João Pinto (c) |
| CF | 21 | (Brazil) Valdir |
Substitutes:
| GK | 12 | (Portugal) Fernando Brassard |
| DF | 4 | (Brazil) Ronaldo | (yellow card) 81' | (substituted on) 45' |
| MF | 13 | (Portugal) Tiago | | (substituted on) 45' | (substituted off) 66' |
| MF | 19 | (Portugal) Bruno Caires |
| MF | 25 | (Sweden) Martin Pringle | | (substituted on) 66' |
Manager:
(Portugal) Manuel José

| GK | 12 | (Portugal) Ricardo |
| RB | 2 | (Portugal) Paulo Sousa (c) |
| CB | 17 | (Portugal) Litos |
| CB | 23 | (Brazil) Isaías |
| LB | 30 | (Portugal) Mário Silva | (yellow card) 55' |
| CM | 4 | (Portugal) José Tavares |
| CM | 3 | (Portugal) Rui Bento | (yellow card) 85' |
| CM | 6 | (Portugal) Hélder Baptista | (yellow card) 88' |
| AM | 10 | (Bolivia) Erwin Sánchez | | (substituted off) 78' |
| AM | 11 | (Federal Republic of Yugoslavia) Saša Simić | (yellow card) 17' | (substituted off) 63' |
| CF | 21 | (Portugal) Nuno Gomes | | (substituted off) 85' |
Substitutes:
| GK | 1 | (Portugal) Alfredo Castro |
| MF | 25 | (Trinidad and Tobago) Russell Latapy |
| FW | 9 | (Netherlands) Jimmy Floyd Hasselbaink | (yellow card) 80' | (substituted on) 78' |
| FW | 20 | (Portugal) Jorge Couto | | (substituted on) 63' |
| FW | 26 | (Portugal) Tulipa | | (substituted on) 85' |
Manager:
(Portugal) Mário Reis

1996–97 Taça de Portugal Winners
Boavista
5th Title

Match officials

- Assistant referees:
- Fourth official:

Match rules

- 90 minutes.
- Five named substitutes
- Maximum of three substitutions
