= 1996–97 Taça de Portugal =

Tournament details
- Country: Portugal
- Dates: September 1996 – 10 June 1997

Final positions
- Champions: Boavista (5th title)
- Runners-up: Benfica

Tournament statistics
- Top goal scorer(s): João Pinto (6 goals)

The 1996–97 Taça de Portugal was the 57th edition of the Portuguese football knockout tournament, organized by the Portuguese Football Federation (FPF). The 1996–97 Taça de Portugal began in September 1996. The final was played on 10 June 1997 at the Estádio Nacional.

Benfica were the previous holders, having defeated Sporting CP 3–1 in the previous season's final. Boavista defeated cup holders Benfica, 3–2 in the final to win their fifth Taça de Portugal. As a result of Boavista winning the domestic cup competition, the Axadrezados faced 1996–97 Primeira Divisão winners Porto in the 1997 Supertaça Cândido de Oliveira.

== Sixth round ==
Ties were played between the 9 March and the 22 April. Due to the odd number of teams involved at this stage of the competition, Maia qualified for the quarter-finals due to having no opponent to face at this stage of the competition.

9 March 1997	Benfica (I)	3–1 (a.e.t.)	Desportivo das Aves (II)	Estádio Adelino Ribeiro Novo, Barcelos
	João Pinto 87'; Valdo 100'; Panduru 108'

9 March 1997	Boavista (I)	2–0	Infesta (III)	Estádio do Bessa, Porto
	Isaías 6'; Nuno Gomes 42'			Referee: Isidoro Rodrigues

9 March 1997	Estrela da Amadora (I)	1–2	Dragões Sandinenses (IV)	Estádio José Gomes, Amadora

9 March 1997	Portimonense (III)	2–3	Estoril (II)	Estádio Municipal de Portimão, Portimão

9 March 1997	Salgueiros (I)	2–3	Porto (I)	Estádio José Vieira de Carvalho, Maia
	Fonseca 20'; Severo 89'		Mendes 33'; Jardel 38'; Zahovič 46'

9 March 1997	Vitória de Setúbal (I)	1–2	Braga (I)	Estádio do Bonfim, Setúbal

22 April 1997	Académica de Coimbra (II)	0–1	Sporting CP (I)	Estádio Cidade de Coimbra, Coimbra
			Vidigal 1'

== Quarter-finals ==
Ties were played between the 2 April and the 7 May.

2 April 1997	Benfica (I)	5–1	Dragões Sandinenses (IV)	Estádio da Luz, Lisbon
	João Pinto 12', 15', 89'; Marinho 20'; Valdir 82'			Referee: António Costa

2 April 1997	Braga (I)	0–2	Porto (I)	Estádio Primeiro de Maio, Braga
			Edmilson 70', 75'

2 April 1997	Estoril (II)	0–1	Boavista (I)	Estádio António Coimbra da Mota, Estoril

7 May 1997	Maia (III)	0–3	Sporting CP (I)	Estádio José Vieira de Carvalho, Maia
			Yordanov 15'; Hadji 30'; Vidigal 84'

== Semi-finals ==
Ties were played between the 30 April and 21 May.

30 April 1997	Benfica (I)	2–0	Porto (I)	Estádio da Luz, Lisbon
	Valdir 28'; Edgar 32'			Referee: Lucílio Batista

21 May 1997	Boavista (I)	3–2 (a.e.t.)	Sporting CP (I)	Estádio do Bessa, Porto
	Baptista 25'; Hasselbaink 59'; Litos 118'		Yordanov 55'; Hadji 67'	Referee: Augusto Duarte

== Final ==
10 June 1997
17:00 WEST

Benfica	2–3	Boavista
Calado 35'; El Hadrioui 61'		Sánchez 8', 59' (pen.); Nuno Gomes 28'

Estádio Nacional, Oeiras
Referee: Paulo Paraty (Porto)
