= Donizete Pantera =

Brazilian footballer (born 1968)

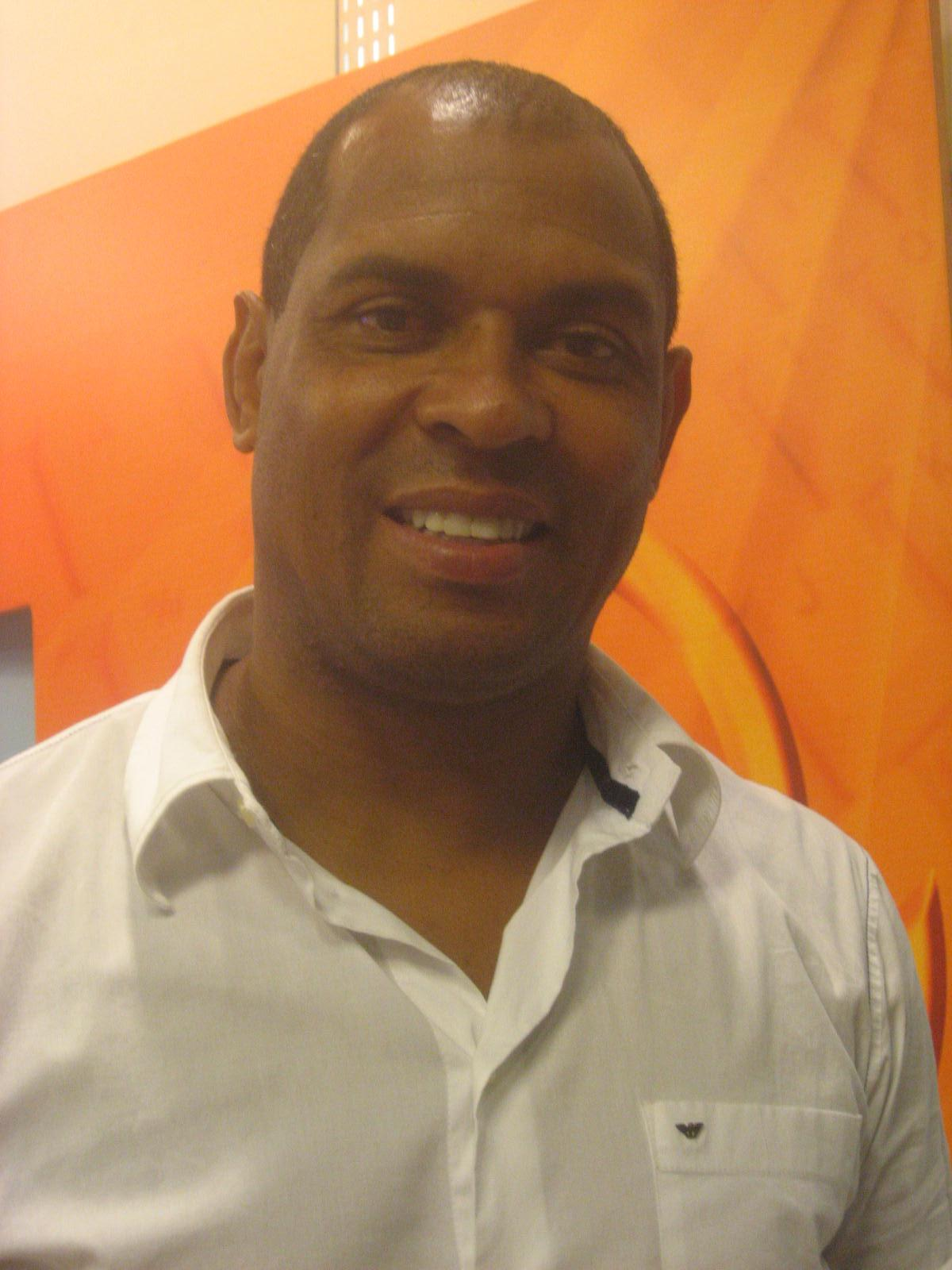
- Donizete Pantera in 2010

Personal information
- Full name: Osmar Donizete Cândido
- Date of birth: 24 October 1968 (age 58)
- Place of birth: Prados, Minas Gerais, Brazil
- Height: 1.79 m (5 ft 10 in)
- Positions: Winger; striker

Team information
- Current team: CFZ do Rio (assistant manager)

Senior career*
Years	Team	Apps	(Gls)
1987–1988	Volta Redonda	0	(0)
1988–1989	São José-SP	0	(0)
1989–1990	Botafogo	15	(1)
1990–1995	Tecos UAG	183	(39)
1995–1996	Botafogo	24	(6)
1996	Verdy Kawasaki	14	(6)
1996–1997	Benfica	16	(7)
1997	Corinthians	21	(4)
1997–2000	Vasco da Gama	30	(8)
1997	→ Cruzeiro (loan)	0	(0)
2000	Tigres	11	(0)
2000–2001	Botafogo	17	(3)
2001	Palmeiras	6	(1)
2003	Tecos UAG	18	(3)
2003	Vasco da Gama	15	(3)
2004–2005	Tecos UAG	8	(0)
2005	Macaé	0	(0)
2006	Londrina	0	(0)
Total		378	(81)

International career
1995–1998	Brazil	9	(2)

Managerial career
- 2015: CFZ do Rio (assistant manager)
Medal record
Representing Brazil
Men's football
CONCACAF Gold Cup
Bronze medal – third place	1998 United States
- * Club domestic league appearances and goals

Osmar Donizete Cândido (born 24 October 1968, known as Donizete Pantera, is a Brazilian retired footballer, who played as a forward, and the assistant manager at CFZ do Rio.

Dubbed as Donizete Pantera, a nickname he received in Mexico, where he won the Balon de Oro for his performances in the 1993–94 Mexican Primera División. He also stood out as part of the Botafogo team that won 1995 Série A, plus would later be influential in the 1998 Copa Libertadores won by Vasco da Gama.

An international for Brazil from 1995 to 1998, he made nine caps and scored twice, but was not included in the squad for the 1998 FIFA World Cup, which he said to be the biggest disappointment of his life.

== Club career ==
Born in Prados, Minas Gerais, Donizete Pantera started his career at Volta Redonda at age 19. After a few months with the third tier team, he moved to São José in 1988, where he help them finish runner-up in the Campeonato Paulista in 1989, losing out to São Paulo.

His performances led him to sign with Botafogo. With competition from Paulinho Criciúma and Milton Cruz, he only made 15 appearances in the Brasileirão, scoring once, on 14 October 1989 against Vitória. In 1990, Donizete Pantera moved to Tecos UAG, spending five seasons there, being an important part in the conquest of the first and only league title for the Mexican side. On 30 April 1994, in the second leg of the championship final against Santos Laguna, with Tecos needing a goal to win the title; Donizete made an individual effort past Santos defence, scoring the second and decisive title. For his influence, he won that season award for best player in the league, the Balon de Oro.

In 1995, he returned to Botafogo, and partnered with Túlio Maravilha in the conquest of second league title for the club. He described the partnership as the best he ever had, "I returned to Brazil in 1995 and had the opportunity to take part in the conquest of the only league title of the Brazilian club. Me and Túlio, who was in an impressive form, scored in every way imaginable, he was the best partner I had"

For the following two seasons, Donizete Pantera moved abroad, playing first at Verdy Kawasaki in the J1 League in 1996 and then moving to Portugal, playing for Benfica. He debuted on 18 August 1996, in the first leg of 1996 Supertaça against Porto, scoring his first goal on 7 September, a double against Gil Vicente. He partnered with João Pinto in the six month he spent at Estádio da Luz, scoring 9 goals in 22 appearances, leaving in late January 1997 for Corinthians.

In Corinthians, he reunited with Túlio Maravilha, winning his first Campeonato Paulista, now beating São Paulo. In the late part of 1997, Donizete Pantera moved to Vasco da Gama, being loaned out to Cruzeiro to play a single game, the 1997 Intercontinental Cup, lost to Borussia Dortmund by 2–0. At Vasco da Gama, he played with Luizão, in the conquest of the 1998 Copa Libertadores. Eliminating Cruzeiro, Grêmio and River Plate in the knock-out stages, Donizete Pantera started and scored in both legs of the 1998 Copa Libertadores Finals, as Vasco defeated Barcelona by 4–1 on aggregate.

He stayed at Vasco da Gama until 2000, losing the 1998 Intercontinental Cup for Real Madrid, and with the arrival of Romário and Edmundo, also losing his place in the line-up. In 2000, the 32-year-old, moved to Tigres for a brief spell in Mexico, returning to Botafogo immediately after. In the final years of his career, he passed through Palmeiras, returned to Tecos twice and to Vasco da Gama once, finally retiring in 2006. In post-football, he works at a foundation created to promote young talents, Fundação Pantera Negra, plus spent time studying to become a football manager.

== International career ==
He made his debut for the Brazil national team in friendly on 8 November 1995 against Argentina, in Buenos Aires, scoring the winning goal in a 1–0 victory for Brazil. It would take nearly 15 years until Brazil won a game in Argentina again. He scored a second goal on 28 August 1996, against Russia, in a 1–1 draw, making his final appearance for his national team on 15 February 1998, against Jamaica at the 1998 CONCACAF Gold Cup. He admitted that the biggest disappointment in his life was not taking part in the 1998 FIFA World Cup, as he described. "I was in most of Zagallo's call ups that season. I was playing well, my performance at Vasco was helping a lot and I was really convinced I would play a World Cup. But then, right close to the announcement of the official squad, Bebeto won my place, and he was not a regular call up; Then Romário got cut out due to injury. I thought they would remember me. Hell, they chose to take Emerson instead, and he was a defensive midfielder. Then I can say that not taking part in the 98 World Cup was the biggest disappointment of my life."

== Career statistics ==
=== Club ===
Appearances and goals by club, season and competition
Club	Season	League		
Club	Season	Division	Apps	Goals
Volta Redonda	1987		0	0
Volta Redonda	1988	Série C	0	0
Volta Redonda	Total		0	0
Botafogo	1989	Série A	15	1
Botafogo	1990	Série A	0	0
Botafogo	Total		15	1
Tecos	1990–91	Mexican Primera División	29	5
Tecos	1991–92	Mexican Primera División	34	2
Tecos	1992–93	Mexican Primera División	38	7
Tecos	1993–94	Mexican Primera División	34	9
Tecos	1994–95	Mexican Primera División	32	10
Tecos	Total		167	33
Botafogo	1995	Série A	24	6
Verdy Kawasaki	1996	J1 League	14	6
Benfica	1996–97	Primeira Divisão	16	7
Corinthians	1997	Série A	21	4
Cruzeiro	1998	Série A	0	0
Vasco da Gama	1998	Série A	11	2
Vasco da Gama	1999	Série A	19	6
Vasco da Gama	Total		30	8
Tigres	1999–2000	Mexican Primera División	10	0
Botafogo	2000	Série A	17	3
Palmeiras	2001	Série A	6	1
Reboceros La Piedad	2001–02	Mexican Primera División	0	0
Tecos	2002–03	Mexican Primera División	16	1
Vasco da Gama	2003	Série A	15	3
Tecos	2003–04	Mexican Primera División	8	0
Macaé Esporte	2005	Carioca Segunda	0	0
Career total			359	73

=== International ===
Appearances and goals by national team and year
National team	Year	Apps	Goals
Brazil	1995	1	1
Brazil	1996	3	1
Brazil	1997	4	0
Brazil	1998	1	0
Total		9	2

== Honours ==
UAG Tecos

- Mexico Primera División: 1993–94

Botafogo

- Campeonato Carioca: 1990
- Campeonato Brasileiro Série A: 1995

Vasco da Gama

- Campeonato Carioca: 1998
- Copa Libertadores: 1998
- Torneio Rio–São Paulo: 1999

Individual

- Mexican Primera División Golden Ball: 1993–94
- Mexican league top scorer: 1995
- Bola de Prata: 1995
