= Pedro Reis =

Pedro Reis may refer to

- Pedro Reis (footballer) (born 1967), Portuguese footballer and coach
- Pedro Reis (economist) (born 1967), Portuguese economist and politician
