= Marco Freitas =

Angolan footballer

Personal information
- Full name: Marco Luis Verissimo de Freitas
- Date of birth: 29 August 1972 (age 54)
- Place of birth: Benguela, Angola
- Height: 1.82 m (6 ft 0 in)
- Position: Defensive midfielder

Youth career
- 1985−1989: Machico
- 1989−1991: Nacional

Senior career*
Years	Team	Apps	(Gls)
1991−1995	Nacional	62	(5)
1991−1992	→ Machico (loan)		
1995−1998	Vitória de Guimarães	62	(3)
1998−2003	Benfica	1	(0)
1998−1999	→ Alverca (loan)	30	(3)
1999−2000	Benfica B	1	(0)
2000−2001	→ Alverca (loan)	9	(0)
2001−2003	→ Salgueiros (loan)	22	(1)
2003−2004	Felgueiras	24	(0)
2004−2005	Pontassolense	24	(3)
2005−2008	Machico	37	(0)
Total		272	(15)

International career
2001−2002	Angola	3	(0)
- * Club domestic league appearances and goals

Marco Luis Verissimo de Freitas (born 29 August 1972), known as Marco Freitas, is an Angolan footballer who played as a defensive midfielder.

== Club career ==
Born in Benguela, Angola, Freitas emigrated to Madeira as a 13-year-old, joining A.D. Machico youth ranks, where he would spend four seasons, moving to C.D. Nacional in 1989. He returned to his former team in his debut season as a professional in 1991-92. He returned to Nacional in the following seasons, where he became a regular used player, amassing over sixty league caps in the second tier.

In 1995, he joined Vitória S.C., where he had, arguably, the best years of his career, being an important player in a team that reached two consecutive fifth-place finishes, plus a club best, third place in 1997-98. His performances led him to S.L. Benfica in 1998, being immediately loaned out to farm team, F.C. Alverca.

In Alverca, Freitas was a regular starter, partnering in the midfield with Jamir Gomes and Nandinho, and helping the club remain in the top tier.

He returned to Benfica in the next year, debuting on 31 October 1999, in an away loss against Alverca. He was mostly a reserve player, almost never being used by Jupp Heynckes. Still under contract with Benfica, Freitas returned to Alverca in 2000, spending one year there, now mostly as a bench player, moving to S.C. Salgueiros for the two remaining years of his contract.

The later years of his career, were spent on the second tier, and third tier, retiring in 2008.

== International career ==
Freitas was on the course to join the Portugal national team in 1996, but it never materialize. He debuted for the Angola national team in 2001, making three caps.
