= Pedro Henriques =

Portuguese footballer and commentator

Personal information
- Full name: Pedro Ricardo Quintela Henriques
- Date of birth: 16 October 1974 (age 52)
- Place of birth: Sintra, Portugal
- Height: 1.80 m (5 ft 11 in)
- Position: Left-back

Youth career
- 1985–1990: Belenenses
- 1990–1993: Benfica

Senior career*
Years	Team	Apps	(Gls)
1993–1997	Benfica	38	(1)
1995	→ Vitória Setúbal (loan)	16	(0)
1997–1998	Porto	0	(0)
1998–2000	Vitória Setúbal	56	(2)
2000–2002	Belenenses	60	(1)
2002–2003	Santa Clara	32	(2)
2003–2005	Académica	20	(0)
Total		222	(6)

International career
1990–1991	Portugal U16	15	(0)
1991–1992	Portugal U17	9	(2)
1991–1993	Portugal U18	22	(2)
1993	Portugal U20	5	(0)
1994–1996	Portugal U21	6	(0)
- * Club domestic league appearances and goals

Pedro Ricardo Quintela Henriques (born 16 October 1974) is a Portuguese former professional footballer who played as a left-back.

He amassed Primeira Liga totals of 222 matches and six goals over 12 seasons, representing mainly Benfica and Vitória de Setúbal.

== Club career ==
Born in Sintra, Lisbon, Henriques joined S.L. Benfica at 15, from neighbouring C.F. Os Belenenses. He played six minutes in his only appearance in the 1993–94 season, a 3–0 away win against Gil Vicente FC, as his team won the Primeira Liga championship.

After a six-month loan at Vitória F.C. and the January 1997 arrival of Manuel José as coach, Henriques became a regular in the starting lineups, as Dimas had just been sold to Juventus FC. In summer 1997 he signed for FC Porto but, due to a knee injury he had contracted still at Benfica, he never appeared official for the club, and returned to Setúbal for the later part of the campaign.

In the following seven seasons, always in the top division, Henriques represented Vitória de Setúbal, Belenenses, C.D. Santa Clara and Académica de Coimbra, retiring aged 30 after additional physical problems at his last team.

== Honours ==
Benfica

- Primeira Liga: 1993–94
- Taça de Portugal: 1995–96

== Post-retirement ==
After retiring, Henriques went on to work several years as a pundit for Portuguese sport channel Sport TV.
