= Quim Berto =

Portuguese football manager and former player

Personal information
- Full name: Joaquim Alberto Ferreira Machado
- Date of birth: 9 October 1971 (age 55)
- Place of birth: Guimarães, Portugal
- Height: 1.67 m (5 ft 5 1/2 in)
- Position: Fullback

Youth career
- 1984–1990: Vitória Guimarães

Senior career*
Years	Team	Apps	(Gls)
1990–1992	Benfica Castelo Branco	28	(3)
1992–1997	Vitória Guimarães	128	(9)
1997–2001	Sporting CP	48	(3)
1998–1999	→ Vitória Guimarães (loan)	15	(2)
2001–2002	Benfica	0	(0)
2001–2002	→ Varzim (loan)	17	(4)
2002–2004	Varzim	60	(10)
2004–2005	Estrela Amadora	28	(4)
2005–2006	Santa Clara	26	(2)
2006–2010	Vizela	101	(5)
Total		451	(42)

Managerial career
- 2011–2012: Vizela
- 2014–2015: Varzim B
- 2015: Varzim
- 2018: Trofense
- 2018–2019: Lusitanos
- 2019–2020: Torreense
- 2020–2021: Tirsense
- * Club domestic league appearances and goals

Joaquim Alberto Ferreira Machado (born 9 October 1971), known as Quim Berto, is a Portuguese former professional footballer who played as a defender (right or left back), currently a manager.

== Playing career ==
Quim Berto was born in Guimarães. Over 11 seasons, he amassed Primeira Liga totals of 238 matches and 18 goals in representation of Vitória SC, Sporting CP and Varzim SC. In the summer of 2001 he signed for S.L. Benfica but never appeared officially for the club, spending one year on loan to the latter side before joining permanently.

Additionally, Quim Berto made 186 second division appearances. In that level, in the 2003–04 campaign, he scored a career-best ten goals in 30 games for Varzim, mostly through his main asset, free kicks.

== Coaching career ==
Quim Berto retired in June 2010 at nearly 39 years of age after spending four seasons with F.C. Vizela, the last in division three. On 27 July of the following year, he was appointed his last team's manager.

Hired at Varzim's reserves in 2014, Quim Berto took over the first team on 5 May 2015 when Vítor Paneira left the second-place side near the end of the season. He ended their four-year exile from the second tier with a 3–1 aggregate win against Casa Pia A.C. the following month; he was dismissed on 22 October, due to poor results.

Following his spell in Póvoa de Varzim, Quim Berto returned to the third division and brief stints with C.D. Trofense and S.C.U. Torreense. Between those jobs, he was briefly in charge of FC Lusitanos of Andorra, who were going through a financial crisis.

== Honours ==
Sporting

- Supertaça Cândido de Oliveira: 2000
