= Mário Wilson =

Portuguese footballer (1929–2016)

Personal information
- Date of birth: 17 October 1929
- Place of birth: Lourenço Marques, Mozambique
- Date of death: 3 October 2016 (aged 86)
- Place of death: Lisbon, Portugal
- Positions: Centre back; forward

Senior career*
Years	Team	Apps	(Gls)
1948–1949	Desportivo Lourenço Marques		
1949–1951	Sporting CP	36	(37)
1951–1963	Académica	250	(15)
Total		286	(52)

Managerial career
- 1964–1968: Académica
- 1968–1970: Belenenses
- 1971: Tirsense
- 1971–1975: Vitória Guimarães
- 1975–1976: Benfica
- 1976–1977: Boavista
- 1977–1979: Vitória Guimarães
- 1978–1980: Portugal
- 1979–1980: Benfica
- 1980–1983: Académica
- 1983–1984: Estoril
- 1984: Boavista
- 1984–1986: Estoril
- 1986–1987: Cova Piedade
- 1987–1988: Louletano
- 1988–1989: Torreense
- 1989: Louletano
- 1989–1990: Olhanense
- 1990–1991: Águeda
- 1993–1995: FAR Rabat
- 1995–1996: Benfica
- 1997: Benfica (caretaker)
- 1997–1999: Alverca
- * Club domestic league appearances and goals

Mário Wilson ComM (Portuguese pronunciation: ['maɾju]; 17 October 1929 – 3 October 2016) was a Portuguese football player and manager.

A central defender or forward, he appeared in 286 Primeira Liga matches over 14 seasons, mainly in representation of Académica. He also played for Desportivo de Lourenço Marques and Sporting CP. Subsequently, Wilson embarked in a lengthy managerial career in the country, which lasted more than 30 years and also included two spells at his main club, and a record five at Benfica.

== Playing career ==
Born in Lourenço Marques, Portuguese Mozambique and the paternal grandson of American trader Henry Wilson and a Mozambican princess, Wilson joined Sporting CP in 1949 aged 19, arriving from local Grupo Desportivo de Lourenço Marques. He started his career as a forward.

After two years at the Estádio José Alvalade, scoring an average of one goal per match, Wilson signed with fellow Primeira Liga side Académica de Coimbra after enrolling at the local university to study (and eventually majoring) geology, remaining there for the rest of his career and retiring in June 1963 at nearly 34 years of age. His best individual season for the Students was 1951–52 when he scored five goals in 24 appearances, helping to a final seventh position (out of 14 teams).

== Coaching career ==
Wilson began working as a coach one year after retiring, spending his first five years with Académica – which he led to a best-ever second position in 1966–67, as well as that year's Portuguese Cup final – then working three seasons with C.F. Os Belenenses. He first managed S.L. Benfica in the 1975–76 campaign, winning the national championship. During his early stint with the latter he coined the phrase "Anyone who coaches Benfica risks being champion", having been dubbed whilst still a player O Velho Capitão (Portuguese for "The Old Captain").

In the late 70s, Wilson accumulated duties at Vitória de Guimarães and the Portugal national team, being in charge of the latter during the unsuccessful UEFA Euro 1980 qualifying campaign. From 1980 to 1983 he again worked with Académica, two of those seasons being spent in the second division. Until the end of the decade he would be in charge of no fewer than six clubs, coaching Louletano D.C. and G.D. Estoril Praia in two different spells.

Wilson replaced fired Artur Jorge at the helm of Benfica after the third round in 1995–96, leading the side to the second position and the season's domestic cup. As an interim he also managed the team in four matches in two different campaigns (1996–97 and the following), winning two, drawing one and losing one.

Wilson's last coaching job was in 1998–99 at the age of 69, with another Lisbon-based club, F.C. Alverca, helping lead them out of the relegation zone in the top tier alongside his successor José Romão, following which he continued to work there in directorial capacities. Subsequently, he worked with the Portuguese Professional Footballers' Union, organising actions for unemployed players, and also opened up his own football school, Mr. Wilson, in the Portuguese capital area.

== Personal life and death ==
Wilson's son, also named Mário (born 1954), was also a footballer. A midfielder, he too played for Académica and Benfica (only 11 matches over three seasons with the latter), competing professionally from 1973 to 1986. His daughter Ana was crowned Miss Portugal in 1982, while his grandson Bruno played youth football for Sporting.

Wilson died on 3 October 2016 in Lisbon aged 86.

== Honours ==
=== Player ===
Sporting

- Primeira Liga: 1950–51

=== Manager ===
Benfica

- Primeira Liga: 1975–76
- Taça de Portugal: 1979–80, 1995–96

=== Individual ===
Orders

- Commander of the Order of Merit
