= Nélson Morais =

Portuguese footballer

Personal information
- Full name: Nélson Dias Morais
- Date of birth: 24 March 1974 (age 52)
- Place of birth: Lisbon, Portugal
- Height: 1.66 m (5 ft 5 1/2 in)
- Position: Full back

Youth career
- 1984−1988: Ginásio Corroios
- 1988−1992: Benfica

Senior career*
Years	Team	Apps	(Gls)
1992−1994	Gil Vicente	15	(0)
1994−1995	União de Leiria	3	(0)
1995−2001	Alverca	110	(1)
1997	→ Benfica (loan)	1	(0)
1998	→ Campomaiorense (loan)	1	(0)
2001−2003	Seixal	15	(1)
Total		145	(2)

International career
1990−1991	Portugal U17	9	(0)
1992−1993	Portugal U18	13	(1)
1994	Portugal U20	4	(0)
1995	Portugal U21	7	(0)
- * Club domestic league appearances and goals

Nélson Dias Morais (born 24 March 1974), is a former Portuguese footballer who played as a full back.

== Career ==
Born in Lisbon, Morais started is youth development at Ginásio Corroios at age 10, joining the larger Benfica in 1988. In 1992, he joined Gil Vicente, debuting for the Gilistas on 30 August 1992, in a home loss against S.C. Braga. In the two seasons he sent in Barcelos, he was mainly a reserve player, representing them in only 15 league games.

In 1994-95 season, he joined U.D. Leiria, playing just 3 games, only one as starter. For the next seasons, Morais dropped down to the second tier, joining F.C. Alverca and becoming an undisputed starter, adding nearly 90 caps in the three seasons the team spent in the second tier.

Acting as a farm team for Benfica, he represented the Reds on one occasion, a 0–2 home loss against Vitória S.C. on 30 May 1997.

In 1998, he was loaned out to S.C. Campomaiorense, starting one match, a 0–5 home trashing by Benfica, on 29 November 1998. He returned to Alverca in January 1999, but did not have the same influence as before, with Valente and later Gaspar Azevedo being preferred choices.

Morais left Alverca in 2001 and played the last two seasons of his career in the third tier, at Seixal

== International career ==
Morais earned 33 caps for Portugal from under-17 to under-21 level, representing Portugal U20 in the 1993 FIFA U20.
