= Paulo Ribeiro =

Portuguese footballer

Personal information
- Full name: Paulo António da Silva Ribeiro
- Date of birth: 6 March 1984 (age 42)
- Place of birth: Setúbal, Portugal
- Height: 1.87 m (6 ft 2 in)
- Position: Goalkeeper

Youth career
- 1995–2003: Vitória Setúbal

Senior career*
Years	Team	Apps	(Gls)
2003–2005	Vitória Setúbal	11	(0)
2005–2006	Porto B	9	(0)
2006–2009	Porto	0	(0)
2007–2008	→ Olhanense (loan)	10	(0)
2008–2009	→ Portimonense (loan)	11	(0)
2009–2010	Vizela	7	(0)
2010–2011	Leixões	2	(0)
2011–2016	Chaves	131	(0)
2016–2017	Vizela	7	(0)
2017–2018	Oliveirense	11	(0)
2018–2020	Pinhalnovense	10	(0)
Total		209	(0)

International career
2002	Portugal U18	3	(0)
2002–2003	Portugal U19	12	(0)
2004	Portugal U20	3	(0)
2004–2007	Portugal U21	14	(0)
2006	Portugal B	1	(0)
- * Club domestic league appearances and goals

Paulo António da Silva Ribeiro (born 6 March 1984) is a Portuguese former professional footballer who played as a goalkeeper.

== Club career ==
Ribeiro was born in Setúbal. After emerging through local Vitória FC's youth academy and making his Primeira Liga debut on 31 January 2005 in a 1–1 away draw against Sporting CP, he joined FC Porto in the summer of 2005. During his two season-spell he could never manage to be more than third choice, only appearing in preseason; he also spent two years on loan in the Segunda Liga.

In 2009, Ribeiro was released by Porto and joined lowly F.C. Vizela. At the end of the campaign he signed with Leixões SC, recently relegated to the second tier, only managing to play twice in the league in his sole season (four competitive matches) and being released by the Matosinhos club.

== Honours ==
Vitória Setúbal

- Taça de Portugal: 2004–05

Porto

- Taça de Portugal: 2005–06
