= Chico Fonseca =

Portuguese footballer

Personal information
- Full name: Francisco José Fernandes Fonseca
- Date of birth: 13 March 1968 (age 58)
- Place of birth: Póvoa de Varzim, Portugal
- Height: 1.73 m (5 ft 8 in)
- Position: Defender

Youth career
- 1982–1986: Varzim

Senior career*
Years	Team	Apps	(Gls)
1986–1987	Aguçadoura		
1987–1988	União Nogueirense		
1988–1992	Infesta		
1992–1994	Belenenses		
1994–1999	Salgueiros		
1999–2001	Paços de Ferreira		
2001–2002	Leça		
2002–2005	Marinhas		
2005–2006	Cabeceirense		
2006–2007	Fão		
2007–2008	Balasar		
2008–2009	Apúlia		
2009–2010	Castanheira		
2010–2011	Fão		
2011–2012	São Romão		
- * Club domestic league appearances and goals

Francisco "Chico" José Fernandes Fonseca (born 13 March 1968) is a retired Portuguese football defender.
