= Zé da Rocha =

Cape Verdean footballer

Personal information
- Full name: José da Rocha Monteiro Silva
- Date of birth: 29 January 1968 (age 58)
- Place of birth: Sal, Cape Verde
- Height: 1.82 m (6 ft 0 in)
- Position: Midfielder

Senior career*
Years	Team	Apps	(Gls)
1990–1991	Académico de Viseu		
1991–1992	Gil Vicente		
1992–1993	Académica		
1993–1994	Rio Ave		
1994–1995	Gil Vicente		
1995–2002	Leça		
2002–2003	Feirense		
2003–2004	Lusitânia		

International career
2000	Cape Verde	2	(0)
- * Club domestic league appearances and goals

José da Rocha Monteiro Silva, known as Zé da Rocha (born 29 January 1968) is a retired Cape Verdean football midfielder.
