= Jorge Soares =

Portuguese footballer

Personal information
- Full name: Jorge Manuel Guerreiro Soares
- Date of birth: 22 October 1971 (age 55)
- Place of birth: Messejana, Portugal
- Height: 1.87 m (6 ft 2 in)
- Position: Centre back

Youth career
- 1984–1985: Messejanense
- 1985–1987: Aljustrelense
- 1987–1990: Farense

Senior career*
Years	Team	Apps	(Gls)
1990–1996	Farense	132	(6)
1996–1998	Benfica	25	(2)
1998−2003	Marítimo	117	(3)
2003−2004	União Madeira	24	(2)
2004−2008	Louletano	98	(2)
Total		396	(15)

International career
1992	Portugal U21	7	(0)

Managerial career
- 2008–2009: Farense (assistant)
Medal record
Men's football
Representing Portugal
UEFA European Under-21 Championship
Runner-up	1994 France
- * Club domestic league appearances and goals

Jorge Manuel Guerreiro Soares (born 22 October 1971) is a Portuguese retired footballer who played as a central defender.

He amassed Primeira Liga totals of 273 games and 11 goals over the course of 13 seasons, representing mainly in the competition Farense and Marítimo.

== Club career ==
Born in the village of Messejana in Aljustrel, Beja, Soares joined S.C. Farense at the age of 15, being first-choice with the first team in his last four years, all spent in the Primeira Liga. In the 1994–95 season he scored a career-best three goals in 26 games to help the club qualify to the UEFA Cup for the first time in its history; late into the following campaign he notably found the net in a 1–0 away win against S.L. Benfica, who subsequently signed him.

During his two-year spell with them, Soares partnered Jorge Bermúdez, Hélder Cristóvão or Tahar El Khalej in the heart of the defense, becoming first-choice after the second moved to Deportivo de La Coruña in the winter transfer season of 1996. In a match against FC Porto on 11 January 1997, however, he was unsuccessful at blocking a cross directed towards Mário Jardel, who stopped it with his chest and scored his team's first in an eventual 2–1 success in Lisbon. After being released he represented C.S. Marítimo in the top flight, C.F. União in the second division and Louletano D.C. in the lower leagues, retiring in 2008 at 36.

== International career ==
Soares amassed 7 caps for the under–21, playing in the 1992 Toulon Tournament, helping his nation win the competition.
