= Luís Gustavo (footballer, born 1968) =

Brazilian footballer (born 1968)

Luis Gustavo
Personal information
- Full name: Luís Gustavo de Carvalho Soares
- Date of birth: 3 September 1968 (age 58)
- Place of birth: Rio de Janeiro, Brazil
- Height: 1.77 m (5 ft 10 in)
- Position: Midfielder

Youth career
- 1983–1986: Botafogo

Senior career*
Years	Team	Apps	(Gls)
1987–1991	Botafogo		
1991–1996	Marítimo	144	(12)
1996–1998	Benfica	10	(2)
1997–1998	→ Cruzeiro (loan)		
1999	Internacional		
2000	Rio Branco (SP)		
- * Club domestic league appearances and goals

Luís Gustavo de Carvalho Soares (born 3 September 1968), commonly known as Luis Gustavo, is a Brazilian former footballer who played as a midfielder.

== Career ==
Born in Rio de Janeiro, Gustavo is a youth product of Botafogo, where he arrived as a 15-year-old. Capable of operating as a left-back or midfielder, Gustavo made his debut for the first team in 1987, helping the team win the 1989 Campeonato Carioca, without any defeats.

He joined C.S. Marítimo in 1991, and made his debut on 18 August 1991, in an away loss against S.C. Farense. He represented the Madeira-side for six years, scoring 12 goals, and having the highest number of assists in 1991 and 1992, plus being the best foreigner in 1994–95.

In 1996, the 28-year-old moved to S.L. Benfica. He made his debut on 25 August 1996, in a home draw against S.C. Braga. His period with Benfica was not so successful as before, appearing in 14 games, acting mainly as a bench player. Six months after joining Benfica, Gustavo moved on a loan deal to Cruzeiro, experiencing a good season there, winning the 1997 Copa Libertadores, and two Campeonato Mineiro.

In 1998, he was released by Benfica and joined Sport Club Internacional in the following year. There he helped the team finish runner-up in the 1999 Campeonato Gaúcho, and reach the semi-finals of the 1999 edition of Copa do Brasil. He ended his career a year later, at 32 years of age, after a spell at Rio Branco (SP).

== Honours ==
Cruzeiro

- Copa Libertadores: 1997
- Campeonato Mineiro: 1997, 1998
