= Jorge Bermúdez =

Colombian footballer (born 1971)

Personal information
- Full name: Jorge Hernán Bermúdez Morales
- Date of birth: 18 June 1971 (age 55)
- Place of birth: Calarcá, Colombia
- Position: Defender

Team information
- Current team: Boca Juniors (technical management)

Senior career*
Years	Team	Apps	(Gls)
1989–1990	Deportes Quindío	72	(0)
1991–1996	América de Cali	134	(6)
1996–1997	Benfica	27	(1)
1997–2001	Boca Juniors	119	(12)
2001–2003	Olympiacos	9	(1)
2003–2004	Newell's Old Boys	27	(2)
2004	Barcelona SC	16	(0)
2005	América de Cali	22	(2)
2005	Deportivo Quevedo	12	(0)
2006	Deportivo Pereira	23	(2)
2006	Independiente Santa Fe	16	(4)
2007	Deportes Quindío	9	(0)
Total		486	(28)

International career
1995–2001	Colombia	56	(3)

Managerial career
- 2007–2008: Depor Jamundí
- 2008: Deportivo Pasto
- 2010: América de Cali
- 2010: Defensa y Justicia
- 2016–2017: Atlético Huila (sporting director)
- 2017: Atlético Huila
- * Club domestic league appearances and goals

Jorge Hernán Bermúdez Morales (born 18 June 1971) is a Colombian former professional footballer who played as a defender. He made 56 appearances for the Colombia national team between 1995 and 2001.

== Playing career ==
Bermúdez played at the club level for several teams in Colombia including Deportes Quindío, América de Cali, Deportivo Quevedo, Deportivo Pereira and Independiente Santa Fe. He started his career with Deportes Quindio which was also the team he finished his career with 17 years later.

Bermúdez also played for a number of clubs outside Colombia including Benfica (Portugal), Boca Juniors (Argentina), Olympiacos (Greece), Newell's Old Boys (Argentina) and Barcelona Guayaquil (Ecuador).

During his time with Boca Juniors he won a number of major titles including the Copa Libertadores and Copa Intercontinental in 2000 and three league titles (Ap 1998, Cl 1999 & Ap 2000).

He was a participant at the 1992 Summer Olympics and went on to play 56 times for the full international squad including appearances at the 1998 FIFA World Cup and in three editions of the Copa América in 1995, 1997 and 1999.

== Later and coaching career ==
After retiring, Bermúdez managed Depor Jamundí, Deportivo Pasto and América de Cali.

In September 2010, Bermúdez was appointed manager of the Argentine 2nd division side Defensa y Justicia. He left the position on 23 November 2010 after five defeats and two draws.

Bermúdez worked as a TV-pundit and commentator at ESPN for a few years, before he was appointed sporting director of Atlético Huila on 6 December 2016. On 22 May 2017, Bermúdez was appointed caretaker manager of Atlético Huila after the coach was fired. He left Huile in June 2017.

In December 2019, Bermúdez was back in football, when he was appointed as a member of Boca Juniors Soccer Council, led by newly appointed vice-president Juan Román Riquelme.

== Career statistics ==
=== Club ===
Appearances and goals by club, season and competition
Club	Season	League			Cup		Continental		Total	
Club	Season	Division	Apps	Goals	Apps	Goals	Apps	Goals	Apps	Goals
América de Cali	1991	Categoría Primera A	–		0	0	10	0	10	0
América de Cali	1992	Categoría Primera A	–		0	0	12	0	12	0
América de Cali	1993	Categoría Primera A	35	0	0	0	3	0	38	0
América de Cali	1994	Categoría Primera A	47	0	0	0	0	0	47	0
América de Cali	1995	Categoría Primera A	26	0	0	0	0	0	26	0
América de Cali	1995–96	Categoría Primera A	26	0	0	0	0	0	26	0
América de Cali	1996–97	Categoría Primera A	26	0	0	0	13	2	39	2
América de Cali	Total		160	0	0	0	38	2	198	2
Benfica	1996–97	Primeira Liga	27	1	3	1	8	0	38	2
Boca Juniors	1997–98	Argentine Primera División	31	1	0	0	–		31	1
Boca Juniors	1998–99	Argentine Primera División	32	3	0	0	0	0	32	3
Boca Juniors	1999–2000	Argentine Primera División	30	4	0	0	15	1	45	5
Boca Juniors	2000–01	Argentine Primera División	26	4	0	0	13	1	39	5
Boca Juniors	Total		119	12	0	0	28	2	147	14
Olympiacos	2001–02	Alpha Ethniki	8	1	–		4	0	12	1
Olympiacos	2002–03	Alpha Ethniki	1	0	0	0	0	0	1	0
Olympiacos	Total		9	1	0	0	4	0	13	0
Newell's Old Boys	2003–04	Argentine Primera División	27	2	0	0	0	0	27	2
Barcelona	2004	Ecuadorian Serie A	16	0	0	0	–	0	16	0
América de Cali	2005	Categoría Primera A	22	2	0	0	0	0	22	2
Deportivo Quevedo	2005	Ecuadorian Serie B	12	0	0	0	0	0	12	0
Deportivo Pereira	2006	Categoría Primera A	23	2	0	0	0	0	23	2
Santa Fe	2006	Categoría Primera A	16	4	0	0	–	0	16	4
Deportes Quindío	2007	Categoría Primera A	9	0	0	0	0	0	9	0
Career total			440	24	3	1	78	4	521	29

=== International ===
#	Date	Stadium	Rival	Goal	Result	Competition
1	1 September 1996	Estadio Metropolitano Roberto Meléndez, Barranquilla	Chile	3-0	4-1	1998 FIFA World Cup qualification
2	15 December 1996	Estadio Polideportivo de Pueblo Nuevo, San Cristóbal, Táchira	Venezuela	1-0	2-0	1998 FIFA World Cup qualification

== Honours ==
América de Cali

- Primera A: 1990, 1992

Boca Juniors

- Primera División: 1998 Apertura, 1999 Clausura, 2000 Apertura
- Copa Libertadores: 2000, 2001
- Intercontinental Cup: 2000

Olympiacos

- Super League Greece: 2001–02, 2002–03

Individual

- South American Team of the Year: 1997, 1998, 2000
