= Pedro Reis (footballer) =

Portuguese football coach and former player

Personal information
- Full name: Eduardo Pedro Reis Silva
- Date of birth: 30 June 1967 (age 59)
- Place of birth: Matosinhos, Portugal
- Height: 1.77 m (5 ft 10 in)
- Position: Defender

Team information
- Current team: Salgueiros (U19 manager)

Senior career*
Years	Team	Apps	(Gls)
1986–1987	Leça		
1987–2000	Salgueiros	340	(7)

Managerial career
- 2008–2010: Salgueiros
- 2010–2011: Salgueiros (U19)
- 2016–: Salgueiros (U19)
- * Club domestic league appearances and goals

Eduardo Pedro Reis Silva (born 30 June 1967), known as Pedro Reis, is a Portuguese football coach and a former player. He is currently managing the Under-19 squad of Salgueiros. He played seasons 11 seasons and 340 games in the Primeira Liga for Salgueiros.

== Career ==
Pedro Reis made his Primeira Liga debut for Salgueiros on 23 August 1987 in a game against Chaves.
