= Dimas (footballer) =

Portuguese footballer (born 1969)

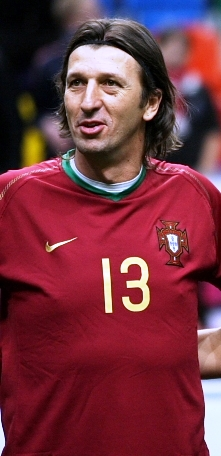
- Dimas in 2011

Personal information
- Full name: Dimas Manuel Marques Teixeira
- Date of birth: 16 February 1969 (age 57)
- Place of birth: Johannesburg, South Africa
- Height: 1.85 m (6 ft 1 in)
- Position: Left-back

Team information
- Current team: União de Santarém (head coach)

Youth career
- 1985–1987: Académica

Senior career*
Years	Team	Apps	(Gls)
1987–1990	Académica	86	(9)
1990–1992	Estrela Amadora	60	(7)
1992–1994	Vitória Guimarães	60	(1)
1994–1996	Benfica	68	(4)
1996–1998	Juventus	39	(0)
1998–1999	Fenerbahçe	24	(4)
2000	Standard Liège	13	(0)
2000–2002	Sporting CP	10	(2)
2002	→ Marseille (loan)	6	(0)
Total		366	(27)

International career
1989	Portugal U21	2	(0)
1988	Portugal U23	3	(0)
1995–2002	Portugal	44	(0)

Managerial career
- 2018: Barnsley (assistant)
- 2018: Karpaty Lviv (assistant)
- 2019: Jeonbuk Hyundai Motors (assistant)
- 2020–2021: B-SAD B (manager)
- 2025: Bodrum FK (assistant)
- 2025–2026: Al-Wahda (assistant and caretaker)
- 2026–: União de Santarém
Medal record
Men's football
Representing Portugal
UEFA European Championship
Bronze medal – third place	2000 Belgium-Netherlands
- * Club domestic league appearances and goals

Dimas Manuel Marques Teixeira (born 16 February 1969), known simply as Dimas, is a Portuguese professional football coach and a former player who played as a left-back. He is the head coach of Liga 3 club União de Santarém.

In a 15-year senior career he represented both Benfica and Sporting CP in his country, also having stints in four other nations, most notably with Juventus in Italy.

Having played nearly 45 times for Portugal, Dimas represented the nation in two European Championships.

== Playing career ==
The son of Portuguese immigrants in South Africa, Dimas was born in Johannesburg, returning to Europe at an early age. He made his professional debut in 1987 with Académica de Coimbra, and stayed with the Students for a further two seasons in spite of their relegation to the Segunda Liga.

Dimas then joined Estrela da Amadora, which had just won the Taça de Portugal. Thus, he made his European competition debut, helping the Lisbon club to reach the second round of the 1990–91 edition of the UEFA Cup Winners' Cup and subsequently signing for Vitória de Guimarães.

After that, solid defensive performances earned him a move to Benfica for 1994–95, where Dimas continue to develop as a player, which led to a November 1996 transfer to Serie A side Juventus. He made 18 appearances in all competitions for the latter in the second half of the season, totalling 21 in the league during his first full campaign while being crowned champion in both years; however, he struggled to break into the first team permanently, and after only one match in 1998–99 he moved to Turkey on 1 October 1998 with Fenerbahçe.

In another winter transfer window, Dimas left Fenerbahçe in 2000 and played six months at Standard Liège. After a good run at UEFA Euro 2000 with Portugal (he made his first international appearance in 1995 while at Benfica, and was the nation's first choice at that and the previous continental competition, playing four games in each), he proved he could still be of value for a title contending team, and returned home after signing for Sporting CP.

After quickly losing the battle for first-choice with fellow international Rui Jorge, mainly due to a right knee injury, Dimas was deemed surplus to requirements, moving on loan to Marseille although he still helped Sporting with two matches in his second season as the capital club claimed the double. He retired at the age of 33, with 44 international caps and 202 Primeira Liga games to his credit.

== Coaching career ==
On 16 February 2018, Dimas was appointed assistant coach at EFL Championship club Barnsley under his countryman José Morais. At the end of the season, which ended in relegation, the pair left Oakwell.

On 18 August 2018, Dimas and Morais joined Ukrainian Premier League side Karpaty Lviv. At the start of the following year, the pair took positions at Jeonbuk Hyundai Motors in South Korea, though he resigned in April 2019.

Dimas later returned to Portugal, where he worked as a coach with B-SAD's youth setup. In 2025, he reunited with Morais as his assistant at Bodrum FK in Turkey and later followed him to Al-Wahda in the UAE Pro League. After Morais departed Al-Wahda in December 2025, Dimas was appointed as the club's interim head coach.

== Style of play ==
Although he was neither the most skilful nor influential player, Dimas was known for his stamina, work-rate, and ability to chase down opponents as a full-back, as well as his commitment and ability to make attacking runs down the left flank.

== Career statistics ==
Appearances and goals by club, season and competition
Club	Season	League		Cup		Europe		Other (Note: Includes Coupe de la Ligue, Supertaça Cândido de Oliveira and Supercoppa Italiana)		Total	
Club	Season	Apps	Goals	Apps	Goals	Apps	Goals	Apps	Goals	Apps	Goals
Académica	1987–88	32	1	1	0	—		—		33	1
Académica	1988–89	30	1	4	0	—		—		34	1
Académica	1989–90	24	7	1	0	—		—		25	7
Académica	Total	86	9	6	0	—		—		92	9
Estrela Amadora	1990–91	32	3			3	0	2	0	37	3
Estrela Amadora	1991–92	28	4			—		—		28	4
Estrela Amadora	Total	60	7			3	0	2	0	65	3
Vitória Guimarães	1992–93	27	0			4	0	—		31	0
Vitória Guimarães	1993–94	33	1	2	0	—		—		35	1
Vitória Guimarães	Total	60	1	2	0	4	0	—		66	1
Benfica	1994–95	30	2	4	0	8	0	3	0	45	2
Benfica	1995–96	30	2	6	0	5	1	—		41	3
Benfica	1996–97	8	0	0	0	3	0	2	0	13	0
Benfica	Total	68	4	10	0	16	1	5	0	99	5
Juventus	1996–97	17	0	1	0	—		—		18	0
Juventus	1997–98	21	0	6	0	8	0	0	0	35	0
Juventus	1998–99	1	0	2	0	0	0	1	0	4	0
Juventus	Total	39	0	9	0	8	0	1	0	57	0
Fenerbahçe	1998–99	23	4	4	0	—		—		27	4
Fenerbahçe	1999–2000	1	0			—		0	0	1	0
Fenerbahçe	Total	24	4	4	0	—		0	0	28	4
Standard Liège	1999–2000	13	0	4	0	—		—		17	0
Sporting CP	2000–01	8	2	0	0	4	0	1	0	13	2
Sporting CP	2001–02	2	0	1	0	0	0	—		3	0
Sporting CP	Total	10	2	1	0	4	0	1	0	16	2
Marseille	2001–02	6	0			—		1	0	7	0
Career total		366	27	36	0	35	1	10	0	447	28

== Honours ==
Benfica

- Taça de Portugal: 1995–96

Juventus

- Serie A: 1996–97, 1997–98
- Supercoppa Italiana: 1997; runner-up: 1998
- UEFA Champions League runner-up: 1997–98

Standard Liège

- Belgian Cup runner-up: 1999–2000

Sporting CP

- Primeira Liga: 2001–02
- Taça de Portugal: 2001–02
- Supertaça Cândido de Oliveira: 2000
