= Marinho (footballer, born 1970) =

Portuguese footballer

Personal information
- Full name: Mário Teixeira da Costa
- Date of birth: 24 November 1970 (age 55)
- Place of birth: Singen, West Germany
- Height: 1.75 m (5 ft 9 in)
- Position: Right back

Youth career
- 1984–1989: Sporting CP

Senior career*
Years	Team	Apps	(Gls)
1989–1995	Sporting CP	69	(0)
1995–1997	Benfica	33	(1)
1997	Campomaiorense	5	(1)
1998	Alverca	8	(0)
1998–1999	Estrela Amadora	1	(0)
2001–2004	Estrela Amadora	4	(0)
Total		120	(2)

International career
1992	Portugal U21	5	(0)

Managerial career
- 2011–2012: Torreense (assistant)
- 2015–2016: Atlético (youth)
- * Club domestic league appearances and goals

Mário Teixeira da Costa (born 24 November 1970), known as Marinho, is a retired Portuguese footballer who played as a right back.

During a 13-year professional career he amassed Primeira Liga totals of 112 games and two goals in 11 seasons, representing five clubs including Sporting and Benfica.

== Club career ==
Born in Singen, West Germany to Portuguese parents, Marinho returned to the land of his ancestors and joined Sporting Clube de Portugal's youth system at the age of 13. Initially a midfielder, he made his competitive debut on 8 March 1989 in a game against F.C. Vizela for the Taça de Portugal, after coming on as a substitute for Paulo Silas.

In the following year, manager Raul Águas converted Marinho into a right back, where he went on to appear in most of his 81 competitive games, eventually beating competition from Fernando Nélson. However, after playing in only ten league games in his last two seasons combined, he signed for crosstown rivals S.L. Benfica in 1995 as a replacement for Abel Xavier.

He played his first game for Benfica in a home draw against Salgueiros on 6 September 1995 and went on to make 24 appearances in all competitions, helping them win the 1995–96 Taça de Portugal. He remained in starting eleven in 1996–97, appearing in 21 games. but with the rise of José Sousa in the following year, he was deemed surplus to Manuel José and joined fellow Primeira Liga side S.C. Campomaiorense. He featured rarely for that team and his following, C.F. Estrela da Amadora, this being interspersed by two years of inactivity.

== International career ==
Marinho represented the under-21 side of the national team at the 1992 Toulon Tournament, playing three games and helping them win the competition.

== Honours ==
Sporting

- Taça de Portugal: 1994–95

Benfica

- Taça de Portugal: 1995–96
