= 1995 Campeonato Brasileiro Série A =

Campeonato Brasileiro Série A
- Season: 1995
- Champions: Botafogo (2nd title)
- Relegated: Paysandu; União São João
- Copa Libertadores: Grêmio (title holders); Botafogo; Corinthians (via Copa do Brasil)
- Matches: 282
- Goals: 712 (2.52 per match)
- Top goalscorer: Túlio (23 goals)

The 1995 Campeonato Brasileiro Série A was the 39th edition of the Campeonato Brasileiro Série A, the top tier of the Brazilian football league system.

== Overview ==
It was contested by 24 teams, and Botafogo won the championship, the club's second Série A title in history.

Of the 24 participating teams, the two lowest placed, Paysandu and União São João, were relegated. Also, the top two teams from the Série B in 1995 would qualify to the Série A in 1996. Fluminense, Palmeiras, Bragantino and Vasco da Gama all qualified for the Copa CONMEBOL, then the third major tournament of the continental zone, behind the Copa Libertadores and the Supercopa Libertadores, the latter reserved only for previous champions of the former.

The eventual champions, Botafogo, together with Corinthians and Grêmio, qualified to the Copa Libertadores of 1996, the major South American cup tournament. Corinthians qualified by winning the Copa do Brasil in 1995 and Grêmio by virtue of being the holders of the Copa Libertadores title.

== First stage ==
=== Group A ===
Pos	Team	Pld	W	D	L	GF	GA	GD	Pts	
1	Cruzeiro	11	8	1	2	23	11	+12	25	Qualified to semifinals
2	Palmeiras	11	7	2	2	19	8	+11	23	
3	Bragantino	11	6	3	2	15	10	+5	21	
4	Paraná	11	5	4	2	13	8	+5	19	
5	Botafogo	11	5	3	3	20	16	+4	18	
6	Guarani	11	3	3	5	13	18	−5	12	
7	Grêmio	11	3	3	5	12	18	−6	12	
8	Juventude	11	2	6	3	6	9	−3	12	
9	Vitória	11	2	5	4	10	16	−6	11	
10	Paysandu	11	2	4	5	14	18	−4	10	
11	Corinthians	11	2	2	7	13	18	−5	8	
12	Flamengo	11	2	2	7	9	17	−8	8	

Source: https://www.rsssfbrasil.com/tablesae/br1995.htm

=== Group B ===
Pos	Team	Pld	W	D	L	GF	GA	GD	Pts	
1	Fluminense	11	6	3	2	10	4	+6	21	Qualified to semifinals
2	Internacional	11	6	3	2	15	10	+5	21	
3	Santos	11	6	1	4	19	18	+1	19	
4	São Paulo	11	5	4	2	9	5	+4	19	
5	Portuguesa	11	5	3	3	16	14	+2	18	
6	Goiás	11	4	4	3	15	9	+6	16	
7	Criciúma	11	4	3	4	10	8	+2	15	
8	Bahia	11	4	2	5	13	16	−3	14	
9	Sport	11	3	3	5	9	11	−2	12	
10	Vasco da Gama	11	3	2	6	14	20	−6	11	
11	Atlético Mineiro	11	2	5	4	9	12	−3	11	
12	União São João	11	1	1	9	7	19	−12	4	

Source: https://www.rsssfbrasil.com/tablesae/br1995.htm

== Second stage ==
=== Group A ===
Pos	Team	Pld	W	D	L	GF	GA	GD	Pts	
1	Botafogo	12	8	3	1	22	6	+16	27	Qualified to semifinals
2	Corinthians	12	7	2	3	19	15	+4	23	
3	Juventude	12	6	5	1	19	12	+7	23	
4	Palmeiras	12	7	1	4	18	11	+7	22	
5	Grêmio	12	6	1	5	14	14	0	19	
6	Bragantino	12	5	4	3	20	16	+4	19	
7	Flamengo	12	3	7	2	14	15	−1	16	
8	Cruzeiro	12	4	2	6	17	15	+2	14	
9	Paraná	12	3	5	4	17	16	+1	14	
10	Guarani	12	4	1	7	14	19	−5	13	
11	Vitória	12	3	2	7	14	18	−4	11	
12	Paysandu	12	1	5	6	11	24	−13	8	

Source: https://www.rsssfbrasil.com/tablesae/br1995.htm

=== Group B ===
Pos	Team	Pld	W	D	L	GF	GA	GD	Pts	
1	Santos	12	8	3	1	25	13	+12	27	Qualified to semifinals
2	Atlético Mineiro	12	8	2	2	23	15	+8	26	
3	Goiás	12	6	1	5	17	14	+3	19	
4	Portuguesa	12	4	5	3	12	14	−2	17	
5	São Paulo	12	4	2	6	17	18	−1	14	
6	Internacional	12	3	5	4	14	12	+2	14	
7	Vasco da Gama	12	4	1	7	18	19	−1	13	
8	Sport	12	4	1	7	16	18	−2	13	
9	Fluminense	12	2	7	3	9	12	−3	13	
10	Bahia	12	3	3	6	9	24	−15	12	
11	Criciúma	12	2	6	4	10	12	−2	12	
12	União São João	12	1	2	9	11	28	−17	5	

Source: https://www.rsssfbrasil.com/tablesae/br1995.htm

== Final standings ==
Pos	Team	Pld	W	D	L	GF	GA	GD	Pts	Qualification or relegation
1	Botafogo (C)	27	14	9	4	46	25	+21	51	1996 Copa Libertadores
2	Santos	27	15	5	7	52	40	+12	50	1996 Supercopa Libertadores
3	Cruzeiro	25	12	5	8	41	27	+14	41	1996 Supercopa Libertadores
4	Fluminense	25	9	10	6	25	22	+3	37	1996 Copa CONMEBOL
5	Palmeiras	23	14	3	6	37	19	+18	45	1996 Copa CONMEBOL
6	Bragantino	23	11	7	5	35	26	+9	40	1996 Copa CONMEBOL
7	Atlético Mineiro	23	10	7	6	32	27	+5	37	
8	Goiás	23	10	5	8	32	23	+9	35	
9	Internacional	23	9	8	6	29	22	+7	35	
10	Portuguesa	23	9	8	6	28	28	0	35	
11	Juventude	23	8	11	4	25	21	+4	35	
12	São Paulo	23	9	6	8	26	23	+3	33	1996 Supercopa Libertadores
13	Paraná	23	8	9	6	30	24	+6	33	
14	Corinthians	23	9	4	10	32	33	−1	31	1996 Copa Libertadores
15	Grêmio	23	9	4	10	26	32	−6	31	1996 Copa Libertadores; 1996 Supercopa Libertadores
16	Criciúma	23	6	9	8	20	20	0	27	
17	Bahia	23	7	5	11	22	40	−18	26	
18	Guarani	23	7	4	12	27	37	−10	25	
19	Sport	23	7	4	12	25	29	−4	25	
20	Vasco da Gama	23	7	3	13	32	39	−7	24	1996 Copa CONMEBOL
21	Flamengo	23	5	9	9	23	32	−9	24	1996 Supercopa Libertadores
22	Vitória	23	5	7	11	24	34	−10	22	
23	Paysandu (R)	23	3	9	11	25	42	−17	18	Relegation to 1996 Série B
24	União São João (R)	23	2	3	18	18	47	−29	9	Relegation to 1996 Série B

(C) Champions; (R) Relegated

== Final stage ==
Semifinals
1	Santos*	1	5
4	Fluminense	4	2
2	Botafogo*	1	0
3	Cruzeiro	1	0

Finals
Santos	1	1
Botafogo	2	1

* Botafogo and Santos qualified to the Final by the advantage of prior results.

Campeonato Brasileiro de Clubes da Série A
1995 Champion

2nd title

== Top scorers ==
Pos.	Scorer	Club	Goals
1	(Brazil) Túlio	Botafogo	23
2	(Brazil) Giovanni	Santos	17
3	(Brazil) Marcelo Ramos	Cruzeiro	14
4	(Brazil) Paulinho McLaren	Cruzeiro	12
5	(Brazil) Valdir	Vasco	11
5	(Brazil) Kelly	Bragantino	11
5	(Brazil) Marcelo Rocha	Sport	11

== Attendances ==
#	Football club	Average attendance
1	Atlético Mineiro	21,073
2	Flamengo	19,782
3	Botafogo	19,527
4	Bahia	17,891
5	Internacional	17,479
6	Goiás	17,068
7	Cruzeiro	16,398
8	Fluminense	11,482
9	Paysandu	11,273
10	Santos	11,198
11	Palmeiras	9,745
12	Vasco da Gama	9,094
13	Grêmio	9,089
14	Corinthians	8,987
15	Criciúma	8,483
16	Paraná	7,864
17	Vitória	7,506
18	Juventude	7,461
19	Guarani	6,182
20	São Paulo	6,140
21	Sport Recife	4,400
22	Portuguesa	3,434
23	União São João	1,699
24	Bragantino	1,548
