= Marcos Severo =

Brazilian footballer

Personal information
- Full name: Marcos Lueders Severo
- Date of birth: 13 March 1965 (age 61)
- Place of birth: São Leopoldo, Brazil
- Height: 1.89 m (6 ft 2 in)
- Position: Forward

Senior career*
Years	Team	Apps	(Gls)
1988–1990	Avaí		
1991–1992	Grêmio		
1992–1993	Londrina		
1994–1995	Ulsan Hyundai		
1996	Ponta Grossa		
1996–1998	Salgueiros		
1998	Varzim (loan?)		
1998	Rio Branco		
- * Club domestic league appearances and goals

Marcos Lueders Severo (born 13 March 1965) is a retired Brazilian football striker.
