= 1996–97 Primeira Divisão =

63rd season of top-tier Portuguese football

Primeira Divisão
- Season: 1996–97
- Champions: Porto; 16th title
- Relegated: Espinho; União de Leiria; Gil Vicente
- Champions League: Porto (group stage); Sporting CP (second qualifying round)
- Cup Winners' Cup: Boavista (first round)
- UEFA Cup: Benfica (first round); Braga (first round); V. Guimarães (first round)
- Matches: 306
- Goals: 760 (2.48 per match)
- Top goalscorer: Mário Jardel (30 goals)
- Biggest home win: Boavista 7–0 Gil Vicente (27 April 1997)
- Biggest away win: Espinho 0–5 Porto (26 October 1996)
- Highest scoring: 4–3 (3 times); 5–2 (2 times)

The 1996–97 Primeira Divisão was the 63rd edition of top flight of Portuguese football. It started on 25 August 1996 with a match between Benfica and Braga, and ended on 15 June 1997. The league was contested by 18 clubs with Porto as the defending champions.

Porto won the league and qualified for the 1997–98 UEFA Champions League group stage, along with Sporting CP, who qualified for the second round, Boavista qualified for the 1997–98 UEFA Cup Winners' Cup first round, and Benfica, Braga and V. Guimarães qualified for the 1997–98 UEFA Cup; in opposite, Espinho, União de Leiria and Gil Vicente were relegated to the Liga de Honra. Mário Jardel was the top scorer with 30 goals.

== Promotion and relegation ==
=== Teams relegated to Liga de Honra ===
- Felgueiras
- Campomaiorense
- Tirsense

Felgueiras, Campomaiorense and Tirsense, were consigned to the Liga de Honra following their final classification in 1995–96 season.

=== Teams promoted from Liga de Honra ===
- Rio Ave
- Vitória de Setúbal
- Espinho

The other three teams were replaced by Rio Ave, Vitória de Setúbal and Espinho from the Liga de Honra.

== Teams ==
=== Stadia and locations ===
Location of teams in Primeira Divisão 1996-97 (Mainland)
Location of teams in Primeira Divisão 1996-97 (Madeira)

Team	Head coach	City	Stadium	1995–96 finish
Belenenses	(Portugal) Quinito	Lisbon	Estádio do Restelo	6th
Benfica	(Brazil) Paulo Autuori	Lisbon	Estádio da Luz	2nd
Boavista	(Serbia and Montenegro) Zoran Filipovic	Porto	Estádio do Bessa	4th
Braga	(Portugal) Manuel Cajuda	Braga	Estádio Primeiro de Maio	8th
Chaves	(Portugal) José Romão	Chaves	Estádio Municipal de Chaves	15th
Espinho	(Brazil) Zinho	Espinho	Estádio Comendador Manuel Violas	3rd in Divisão de Honra
Estrela da Amadora	(Portugal) Fernando Santos	Amadora	Estádio José Gomes	13th
Farense	(Spain) Paco Fortes	Faro	Estádio de São Luís	10th
Gil Vicente	(Portugal) Bernardino Pedroto	Barcelos	Estádio Adelino Ribeiro Novo	11th
Leça	(Portugal) Rodolfo Reis	Leça da Palmeira	Estádio do Leça FC	14th
Marítimo	(Brazil) Marinho Peres	Funchal	Estádio dos Barreiros	9th
Porto	(Portugal) António Oliveira	Porto	Estádio das Antas	1st
Rio Ave	(Portugal) Henrique Calisto	Vila do Conde	Estádio dos Arcos	1st in Divisão de Honra
Salgueiros	(Portugal) Carlos Manuel	Porto	Estádio Engenheiro Vidal Pinheiro	12th
Sporting	(Belgium) Robert Waseige	Lisbon	Estádio José Alvalade	3rd
União de Leiria	(Portugal) Vítor Manuel	Leiria	Estádio Dr. Magalhães Pessoa	7th
Vitória de Guimarães	(Portugal) Jaime Pacheco	Guimarães	Estádio D. Afonso Henriques	5th
Vitória de Setúbal	(Portugal) Mário Reis	Setúbal	Estádio do Bonfim	2nd in Divisão de Honra

=== Managerial changes ===
Team	Outgoing manager	Date of vacancy	Position in table	Incoming manager	Date of appointment
União de Leiria	(Portugal) Vítor Manuel	20 October 1996	17th	(Portugal) Eurico Gomes	21 October 1996
Belenenses	(Portugal) Quinito	27 October 1996	15th	(Portugal) Vítor Manuel	28 October 1996
Marítimo	(Brazil) Marinho Peres	17 November 1996	12th	(Portugal) Manuel José	18 November 1996
Boavista	(Serbia and Montenegro) Zoran Filipovic	19 November 1996	10th	(Portugal) João Alves	20 November 1996
Gil Vicente	(Portugal) Bernardino Pedroto	1 December 1996	17th	(Portugal) Fernando Festas	2 December 1996
Sporting	(Belgium) Robert Waseige	12 December 1996	3rd	(Portugal) Octávio Machado	20 December 1996
Rio Ave	(Portugal) Henrique Calisto	22 December 1996	18th	(Portugal) Carlos Brito	23 December 1996
Boavista	(Portugal) João Alves	12 January 1997	10th	(Portugal) Mário Reis	27 January 1997
União de Leiria	(Portugal) Eurico Gomes	19 January 1997	16th	(Portugal) Quinito	20 January 1997
Benfica	(Brazil) Paulo Autuori	19 January 1997	2nd	(Mozambique) Mário Wilson	20 January 1997
Marítimo	(Portugal) Manuel José	26 January 1997	12th	(Portugal) Rui Vieira	27 January 1997
Benfica	(Mozambique) Mário Wilson	26 January 1997	3rd	(Portugal) Manuel José	27 January 1997
Vitória de Setúbal	(Portugal) Mário Reis	26 January 1997	7th	(Portugal) Mourinho Félix	27 January 1997
Marítimo	(Portugal) Rui Vieira	16 February 1997	11th	(Portugal) Augusto Inácio	17 February 1997
Vitória de Setúbal	(Portugal) Mourinho Félix	10 March 1997	11th	(Portugal) Manuel Fernandes	11 March 1997
Gil Vicente	(Portugal) Fernando Festas	23 March 1997	18th	(Brazil) José Marconi	24 March 1997
Espinho	(Brazil) Zinho	11 May 1996	16th	(Brazil) Edmundo Duarte	12 May 1996

== League table ==
Pos	Team	Pld	W	D	L	GF	GA	GD	Pts	Qualification or relegation
1	Porto (C)	34	27	4	3	80	24	+56	85	Qualification to Champions League group stage
2	Sporting CP	34	22	6	6	55	19	+36	72	Qualification to Champions League second qualifying round
3	Benfica	34	17	7	10	49	30	+19	58	Qualification to UEFA Cup first round
4	Braga	34	15	10	9	39	40	−1	55	Qualification to UEFA Cup first round
5	Vitória de Guimarães	34	15	8	11	51	46	+5	53	Qualification to UEFA Cup first round
6	Salgueiros	34	14	10	10	49	48	+1	52	
7	Boavista	34	12	13	9	62	39	+23	49	Qualification to Cup Winners' Cup first round (Note: Boavista qualified for the Cup Winners' Cup as Portuguese Cup winners)
8	Marítimo	34	13	8	13	39	38	+1	47	
9	Estrela da Amadora	34	12	11	11	39	38	+1	47	
10	Chaves	34	12	10	12	39	45	−6	46	
11	Farense	34	10	12	12	34	34	0	42	
12	Vitória de Setúbal	34	10	10	14	38	42	−4	40	
13	Belenenses	34	10	10	14	37	50	−13	40	
14	Leça	34	9	9	16	33	42	−9	36	
15	Rio Ave	34	8	11	15	35	42	−7	35	
16	Espinho (R)	34	9	6	19	27	56	−29	33	Relegation to Segunda Divisão de Honra
17	União de Leiria (R)	34	8	6	20	25	53	−28	30	Relegation to Segunda Divisão de Honra
18	Gil Vicente (R)	34	4	7	23	29	74	−45	19	Relegation to Segunda Divisão de Honra

Source: Primeira Divisão
Rules for classification: 1st points, 2nd head-to-head, 3rd goals average
(C) Champions; (R) Relegated

== Results ==
Home \ Away	BEL	BEN	BOA	BRA	CHA	ESP	EST	FAR	GVI	LEÇ	MAR	POR	RAV	SAL	SCP	ULE	VGU	VSE
Belenenses		1–0	2–4	1–2	0–0	0–0	0–0	1–2	1–1	0–4	2–0	0–2	2–1	0–0	2–2	1–0	1–1	2–1
Benfica	1–2		1–1	1–1	3–0	2–0	2–0	2–1	1–0	1–0	0–0	1–2	0–0	3–4	1–0	1–0	0–2	5–1
Boavista	1–1	1–1		3–0	0–1	0–2	2–2	1–1	7–0	0–0	3–1	0–2	2–0	5–0	2–1	3–0	2–2	0–0
Braga	3–1	1–1	1–0		3–0	2–1	1–2	2–1	4–1	1–0	0–0	2–1	1–0	0–0	1–0	1–0	0–2	2–1
Chaves	2–2	3–1	2–1	5–2		1–0	1–0	1–1	4–1	1–0	2–1	2–4	1–1	1–1	0–0	2–0	0–0	0–1
Espinho	0–1	0–3	0–0	0–1	1–1		2–1	1–0	1–0	0–2	1–0	0–5	1–2	1–1	1–3	1–0	1–4	0–3
Estrela da Amadora	2–2	1–1	2–5	3–1	3–0	2–0		2–1	2–0	1–0	0–0	2–2	0–0	2–1	0–1	0–1	2–0	2–0
Farense	0–2	1–2	2–0	2–2	0–2	3–1	1–0		2–1	0–0	1–0	1–2	2–1	1–1	0–0	4–0	1–0	1–1
Gil Vicente	1–2	0–3	2–4	1–1	3–0	1–0	0–1	1–1		1–0	1–2	0–3	2–2	1–3	0–3	3–4	1–1	0–0
Leça	3–2	1–5	1–3	0–0	3–2	1–1	1–1	0–0	1–1		1–0	2–4	3–2	3–1	0–1	3–0	1–1	0–2
Marítimo	1–0	2–0	2–2	1–1	3–3	1–0	2–0	1–0	6–0	0–1		0–2	1–0	3–1	1–2	2–0	1–2	3–2
Porto	2–1	3–1	1–0	5–0	2–0	3–0	0–0	2–0	3–0	2–1	4–1		2–2	1–2	1–2	2–0	3–1	2–2
Rio Ave	4–1	0–1	0–0	1–0	0–0	0–3	2–0	0–0	0–2	2–0	2–3	0–1		1–1	3–4	3–1	1–1	1–0
Salgueiros	1–2	0–1	3–2	3–0	1–0	5–0	3–3	2–1	3–2	1–0	0–0	0–1	1–3		0–3	3–0	0–0	3–2
Sporting CP	3–1	1–0	3–1	1–0	2–0	4–0	0–0	0–0	2–0	1–0	3–0	0–1	2–0	4–0		0–0	4–1	2–1
União de Leiria	3–1	0–2	1–1	1–2	0–1	2–2	2–0	0–0	2–0	1–1	2–0	0–3	1–0	0–1	1–0		2–3	0–0
Vitória de Guimarães	1–0	1–0	0–4	0–0	4–1	2–4	3–1	3–2	4–2	3–0	0–1	0–4	2–0	1–2	0–1	3–0		3–0
Vitória de Setúbal	2–0	0–2	2–2	1–1	1–0	0–2	1–2	0–1	1–0	1–0	0–0	1–3	1–1	1–1	1–0	4–1	4–0	

Source: Foradejogo (in Portuguese)
Legend: Blue = home team win; Yellow = draw; Red = away team win.

== Top goalscorers ==
Rank	Player	Club	Goals
1	(Brazil) Mário Jardel	Porto	30
2	(Netherlands) Jimmy Floyd Hasselbaink	Boavista	20
3	(Brazil) Gaúcho	Estrela da Amadora	16
4	(Portugal) Constantino Jardim	Leça	15
4	(Portugal) Nuno Gomes	Boavista	15
6	(Croatia) Karoglan	Braga	14
7	(Brazil) Gilmar	Vitória de Guimarães	13
8	(Brazil) Edmilson	Marítimo	12
9	(Brazil) Edmilson	Porto	11
10	(Brazil) Marcos Severo	Salgueiros	10

== Attendances ==
#	Club	Average
1	Porto	27,765
2	Benfica	18,882
3	Sporting	16,765
4	Vitória SC	9,029
5	Braga	8,588
6	Farense	6,412
7	Vitória FC	5,882
8	Boavista	5,618
9	Marítimo	4,853
10	Rio Ave	4,618
11	União de Leiria	4,235
12	Salgueiros	4,176
13	Espinho	4,088
14	Chaves	3,676
15	Os Belenenses	3,529
16	Gil Vicente	3,421
17	Leça	3,176
18	Estrela da Amadora	3,088
