= Jamir Gomes =

Brazilian footballer

Personal information
- Full name: Jamir Adriano Paz Gomes
- Date of birth: 13 May 1972 (age 54)
- Place of birth: Uruguaiana, Brazil
- Height: 1.80 m (5 ft 11 in)
- Position: Defensive midfielder

Youth career
- 1989-1991: São José

Senior career*
Years	Team	Apps	(Gls)
1991	São José		
1991−1994	Grêmio	37	(0)
1995−1996	Botafogo	24	(1)
1996−1997	Benfica	12	(1)
1997−1998	→ Flamengo (loan)	33	(0)
1998−2000	→ Alverca (loan)	24	(1)
2000	Bolognesi	0	(0)
2001	São Gabriel	0	(0)
2001	Vasco da Gama	14	(1)
2002	Portuguesa	7	(0)
2002	Portuguesa Santista		
2003	Brasiliense		
2004	CRB		
2005	São José		
Total		151	(4)
- * Club domestic league appearances and goals

Jamir Adriano Paz Gomes (born 13 May 1972) is a Brazilian former professional footballer who played as a defensive midfielder.

== Career ==
Born in Uruguaiana, Gomes is a product of São José youth system, from where he moved to the larger Grêmio in 1987. At the Tricolour side, he was part of squad that finished runner-up in the 1993 Copa do Brasil, and won it in the following year, while also bagging a regional title.

In 1995, he joined Botafogo, helping the team win their first league title in their history under Paulo Autuori leadership. In the summer of 1996, Gomes reunited with Autuori at Benfica, but rarely played as Amaral was regular starter.

He was subsequently loaned out to Flamengo, staying for two years, and losing another Copa do Brasil. The 28-year-old then signed with Alverca, which had just recently been promoted to the top tier, playing alongside Kulkov in the last of his two seasons spent there.

After leaving Portugal, he had short stints in various clubs, the larger being Vasco da Gama and Portuguesa, retiring at age 33 in 2005.

== Honours ==
Grémio

- Campeão da Copa do Brasil: 1994
- Campeão do Campeonato Gaúcho:1993

Botafogo

- Série A:1995
