= Edmílson (footballer, born 1971) =

Brazilian footballer

Personal information
- Full name: Edmílson Gonçalves Pimenta
- Date of birth: 17 September 1971 (age 55)
- Place of birth: Santa Teresa, Brazil
- Height: 1.82 m (6 ft 0 in)
- Positions: Striker; winger

Senior career*
Years	Team	Apps	(Gls)
1990–1991	AA Colatina		
1992–1993	Democrata		
1993–1994	Nacional	30	(4)
1994–1995	Salgueiros	34	(15)
1995–1997	Porto	59	(24)
1997	Paris Saint-Germain	14	(0)
1998–2000	Sporting CP	66	(19)
2001	Palmeiras	5	(1)
2002–2003	CTE Colatina		
2003–2004	Portimonense	24	(9)
2004	FK Lyn	8	(0)
2005–2006	Visétois	3	(0)
2006–2007	CTE Colatina		
Total		243	(72)
- * Club domestic league appearances and goals

Edmílson Gonçalves Pimenta (born 17 September 1971 in Santa Teresa, Espírito Santo), known simply as Edmílson, is a Brazilian retired footballer who played in various attacking positions.

== Football career ==
After starting out as a senior for modest Associação Atlética Colatina and Esporte Clube Democrata, Edmílson moved to Portugal in the 1993 off-season, going on to remain in the country for most of his professional career. He began with C.D. Nacional – in the second division – and S.C. Salgueiros, where his solid performances earned him a transfer to FC Porto in the Primeira Liga.

At Porto, Edmílson was instrumental as the club won the second and third of its five consecutive league accolades, signing a lucrative contract with French side Paris Saint-Germain FC. Unsettled, he returned to Portugal in January 1998, joining Sporting Clube de Portugal; he scored ten goals in his first full season with the Lions and, although not an essential first-team member, still contributed with 21 matches in 1999–2000 as they ended an 18-year drought and conquered the title.

Until his retirement in 2007, Edmílson played in quick succession with Sociedade Esportiva Palmeiras, Portimonense SC, FK Lyn, R.C.S. Visétois and amateurs CTE Colatina (two spells).

== Honours ==
Sporting

- Supertaça Cândido de Oliveira: 2000
