= Edgar Pacheco (footballer, born 1977) =

Portuguese footballer (born 1977)

Edgar
Personal information
- Full name: Edgar Patrício de Carvalho Pacheco
- Date of birth: 7 August 1977 (age 49)
- Place of birth: Luanda, Angola
- Height: 1.79 m (5 ft 10 in)
- Position: Forward

Youth career
- 1990–1995: Benfica

Senior career*
| Years | Team | Apps | (Gls) |
| 1995–1998 | Benfica | 48 | (6) |
| 1997 | → Alverca (loan) | 16 | (2) |
| 1998 | Real Madrid | 0 | (0) |
| 1998–2007 | Málaga | 202 | (20) |
| 2003 | → Getafe (loan) | 19 | (1) |
| 2007–2008 | Boavista | 7 | (0) |
| 2008–2009 | Alki Larnaca | 12 | (0) |
| Total | | 304 | (29) |

International career
| 1993 | Portugal U15 | 4 | (2) |
| 1993–1994 | Portugal U16 | 21 | (3) |
| 1994 | Portugal U17 | 4 | (2) |
| 1994–1996 | Portugal U18 | 11 | (1) |
| 1997–1998 | Portugal U20 | 11 | (2) |
| 1995–1999 | Portugal U21 | 25 | (3) |
| 2001 | Portugal B | 2 | (0) |
| 1998 | Portugal | 1 | (0) |
- * Club domestic league appearances and goals

Edgar Patrício de Carvalho Pacheco (born 7 August 1977), known simply as Edgar, is a former footballer who played as a forward. Born in Angola, he represented Portugal internationally.

After making his professional debut with Benfica at the age of 18 he appeared irregularly for the club, and spent most of his later career in Spain, almost exclusively in representation of Málaga.

== Club career ==
Born in Luanda, Angola, Edgar was a product of S.L. Benfica's youth system, making his debut with the first team at only 18 by playing 45 minutes in a 1–0 away win against F.C. Tirsense on 26 August 1995 and finishing his first season with 21 appearances and two goals. He was regularly used during his spell, but mainly from the bench, and also served a six-month loan at F.C. Alverca who acted as the farm team, in the second division.

In summer 1998, Edgar was bought by Real Madrid, but never represented the La Liga club. He went on to spend the following eight years in the country, almost exclusively with Málaga CF; in the 2002–03 campaign he played for four months with Getafe CF on loan, in the second level.

With the Andalusians, Edgar was a heavily used attacking weapon. Having partnered compatriots Duda and Litos for four and five seasons respectively, he eventually appeared in 218 games across all competitions, helping the side to top-flight promotion in his first year.

Edgar then returned to Portugal for 2007–08, in a disastrous campaign with Boavista FC – seven matches for the player, Primeira Liga relegation for the club (due to irregularities). He quickly moved abroad again, signing with Cyprus' Alki Larnaca FC, being released after one sole season and retiring from football at age 31.

== International career ==
Edgar was born in Angola to a Portuguese father and Angolan mother, and moved to Portugal at a young age. He played for Portugal internationally. After earning 25 caps for the under-21s he appeared once with the full side, against Mozambique on 19 August 1998.

Subsequently, Edgar had his application to represent Angola rejected in December 2004, because he had already represented one nation at senior level.

== Honours ==
Benfica

- Taça de Portugal: 1995–96

Málaga

- UEFA Intertoto Cup: 2002
- Segunda División 1998–99
