= Lucílio Batista =

Portuguese football referee

Lucílio Cardoso Cortez Batista (born 26 April 1965 in Lisbon) is a retired Portuguese football referee. A bank teller by profession, Batista started refereeing Portuguese first division matches in the mid-1990s in the national territory. Internationally, he refereed two matches at UEFA Euro 2004, on home soil. He also refereed two matches at the 2003 FIFA Confederations Cup in France.

Batista also had a run in the UEFA Champions League (16 matches) and UEFA Cup (ten) during his career. He retired from the game at the end of the 2009–10 season.

- 2006 Ukrainian Cup Final
