= Tahar El Khalej =

Moroccan footballer

Personal information
- Full name: Tahar El Khalej
- Date of birth: 16 June 1968 (age 58)
- Place of birth: Marrakesh, Morocco
- Height: 1.90 m (6 ft 3 in)
- Positions: Defender; midfielder

Senior career*
Years	Team	Apps	(Gls)
1990–1994	Kawkab Marrakech	?	(?)
1994–1997	UD Leiria	43	(8)
1997–2000	Benfica	72	(10)
2000–2003	Southampton	58	(3)
2003	Charlton Athletic	3	(0)
Total		176	(21)

International career
1990–2001	Morocco	58	(3)
- * Club domestic league appearances and goals

Tahar El Khalej (Arabic: الطاهر الخلج, romanized: Taher Lakhlej; born 16 June 1968) is a Moroccan former footballer who played as a defender.

== Club career ==
Born in Marrakesh, El Khalej started at Kawkab Marrakech in 1990, spending four seasons there, helping them win one league title and two national cups. In 1994, he moved to Portugal to sign with UD Leiria, which was, at the time, recently promoted to the first tier. Making his debut on 22 October 1994, against Vitória de Guimarães, he was frequently used as a midfielder alongside Mário Artur and Abel. After two seasons in Leiria, El Khalej joined Benfica in 1997. He made his debut on 9 September 1997 and went on to amass nearly 100 appearances, 72 in the league, without winning any silverware.

With the arrival of Jupp Heynckes, El Khalej lost influence and made only 4 league appearances, two as a substitute in the 1999–2000 season, so he moved to Southampton in March 2000 for £350,000, as Glenn Hoddle's first signing for his new club, although the deal had already been arranged by Dave Jones. He scored on his debut in a 7–2 defeat against Tottenham Hotspur on 11 March 2000. Faced with stiff competition as a central defender from Claus Lundekvam and Dean Richards, he was later employed in a midfield role.

One of his more notable moments was during a match against Newcastle on 12 May 2002, where he made a reckless lunge on Kieron Dyer, which earned him a straight red card. Dyer was injured for months afterwards and threatened Tahar with legal action if he had missed the 2002 World Cup, which did not happen. In January 2003, El Khalej moved to Charlton Athletic on a six-month deal after 65 appearances for the Saints, scoring four goals.

At the end of the season, he returned to Morocco, retiring from professional football. He, then, worked as president of Kawkab Marrakech in 2005–06 when they played in the Moroccan 2nd division, achieving promotion to the Moroccan first division before he left the club.

== International career ==
He played for the Morocco national football team and was a participant at the 1994 FIFA World Cup and at the 1998 FIFA World Cup.

== Personal life ==
He is married and has two sons, Yassine and Ahmed.

During the 2026 FIFA World Cup, El Khalej provided a technical analysis regarding Morocco's group stage campaign under manager Mohamed Ouahbi, correctly predicting a decisive victory in their final group match against Haiti.
