= 1995–96 S.L. Benfica season =

Benfica
1995–96 season
- President: Manuel Damásio
- Head coach: Artur Jorge (until 9 September 1995); Mário Wilson
- Stadium: Estádio da Luz
- Primeira Divisão: 2nd
- Taça de Portugal: Winners
- UEFA Cup: Third round
- Top goalscorer: League: João Pinto (18); All: João Pinto (23)
- Highest home attendance: 50,000 v Porto (23 March 1996)
- Lowest home attendance: 4,000 v Chaves (9 March 1996)
- Biggest win: Benfica 4–0 União de Leiria (29 December 1995); Benfica 5–1 Marítimo (12 May 1996)
- Biggest defeat: Porto 3–0 Benfica (5 November 1995); Bayern Munich 4–1 Benfica (21 November 1995)
Home colours

The 1995–96 season was Sport Lisboa e Benfica's 92nd season in existence and the club's 62nd consecutive season in the top flight of Portuguese football, covering the period from 1 July 1995 to 30 June 1996. It involved Benfica competing in the Primeira Divisão and the Taça de Portugal. Benfica qualified for the UEFA Cup by coming third in previous League.

After failing to renew the title in the past season, the club brought in several players during the transfer market, with Ricardo Gomes, Valdo, Calado and Marcelo assuming regular starter roles. However, the club lost all of his more historic players as the case of Neno, Vítor Paneira, Isaías and César Brito. With the animosity around Artur Jorge increasing, poor results in September caused his departure. Despite an irregular season in the league, various winning streaks helped the team reach their second-place finish by 23 March, after a home win against Porto. In the Portuguese Cup, a strong performance from Marcelo throughout the competition, who finish as the tournament top scorer, guided the team to the final, where João Pinto delivered the trophy after scoring a double.

== Season summary ==
The second season of Artur Jorge started with much more distrust over his abilities. From the large number of signings in the year before, only a handful prove noteworthy, and Tavares and Nelo even showed a complete inability to play for a big club. Despite that, more exits followed, with a 28-year-old Vítor Paneira, and the club league topscorer in the year before; Isaías, causing the most anger. Benfica signed mostly in Portugal, as with the league top goalscorer, Hassan, but also searched in Europe, bringing Valdo and Ricardo Gomes, back from France.

The league start was not ideal, as the team dropped four points in three match-days, leading to Artur Jorge being sacked after the build up of fan pressure. The club then selected Mário Wilson as his replacement. Benfica slowly started collecting wins over the following weeks, but after the defeat against FC Porto in the Clássico of 5 November, the distance to the league leader increased to eight points. In Europe, the ended their campaign, after being knock out by Bayern Munich, with Klinsmann scoring six goals, in what the press dubbed 'Cataklinsmann'.

In November, with Porto putting on a strong campaign, the club set eyes on closing the distance on the second place, occupied by Sporting. At the end of January, Benfica reach the second place for the first time, after João Pinto led the club past Vitória Guimarães. In the following month, a strong performance by Marcelo, allowed the club to progress through the Portuguese Cup semi-finals after beating Vitória de Guimarães. However, February did not go as well in the league race, with the club spending two weeks on the fourth place.

In March, Benfica received and beat Porto, with João Pinto scoring the winning goal, as he have done in Guimarães. With this win, the club re-assumed the second place, which would be its final league position, finishing the season six points ahead of Sporting, but an eleven behind Porto, which had the title wrapped up nearly a month before. In April, with only the Portuguese Cup to compete for. Marcelo continued his goalscoring record on the national cup, scoring a double in overtime for the semi-final against Leiria. On the 18 May, in the 1996 Taça de Portugal final, João Pinto scored two against Sporting in a 3–1 win, with the club winning its twenty-third Taça de Portugal. The celebrations were nonetheless cancelled due to the death of a Sporting supporter, after being accidentally hit by a lost flare.

== Competitions ==
Win Draw Loss Postponed

=== Overall record ===
| Competition | First match | Last match | Record | | | | | | | | |
| Competition | First match | Last match | G | W | D | L | GF | GA | GD | Win % | Source |
|---|---|---|---|---|---|---|---|---|---|---|---|
| Primeira Divisão | 26 August 1995 | 12 May 1996 | 34 | 22 | 7 | 5 | 57 | 27 | +30 | 64.71 | |
| Taça de Portugal | 1 December 1995 | 18 May 1996 | 6 | 5 | 1 | 0 | 12 | 2 | +10 | 83.33 | |
| UEFA Cup | 12 September 1995 | 5 December 1995 | 6 | 3 | 1 | 2 | 10 | 11 | −1 | 50.00 | |
| Total | | | 46 | 30 | 9 | 7 | 79 | 40 | +39 | 65.22 | |

=== Primeira Divisão ===
==== League table ====
| Pos | Team | Pld | W | D | L | GF | GA | GD | Pts | Qualification or relegation |
|---|---|---|---|---|---|---|---|---|---|---|
| 1 | Porto (C) | 34 | 26 | 6 | 2 | 84 | 20 | +64 | 84 | Qualification to Champions League group stage |
| 2 | Benfica | 34 | 22 | 7 | 5 | 56 | 25 | +31 | 73 | Qualification to Cup Winners' Cup first round (Note: Benfica qualified for the Cup Winners' Cup as Portuguese Cup winners) |
| 3 | Sporting CP | 34 | 19 | 10 | 5 | 69 | 27 | +42 | 67 | Qualification to UEFA Cup first round |
| 4 | Boavista | 34 | 19 | 8 | 7 | 59 | 28 | +31 | 65 | Qualification to UEFA Cup first round |
| 5 | Vitória de Guimarães | 34 | 19 | 5 | 10 | 55 | 39 | +16 | 62 | Qualification to UEFA Cup first round |

Rules for classification: 1st points, 2nd head-to-head, 3rd goals average
(C) Champions

==== Results by round ====
| Round | 1 | 2 | 3 | 4 | 5 | 6 | 7 | 8 | 9 | 10 | 11 | 12 | 13 | 14 | 15 | 16 | 17 | 18 | 19 | 20 | 21 | 22 | 23 | 24 | 25 | 26 | 27 | 28 | 29 | 30 | 31 | 32 | 33 | 34 |
|---|---|---|---|---|---|---|---|---|---|---|---|---|---|---|---|---|---|---|---|---|---|---|---|---|---|---|---|---|---|---|---|---|---|---|
| Ground | H | A | H | A | H | A | H | A | H | A | H | A | H | A | A | H | A | A | H | A | H | AA | H | A | H | A | H | A | H | A | H | H | A | H |
| Result | D | W | D | W | W | L | W | W | W | L | D | W | W | W | W | W | D | L | W | W | W | L | D | W | W | D | W | W | W | D | L | W | W | W |
| Position | 10 | 7 | 6 | 4 | 3 | 5 | 3 | 3 | 3 | 4 | 4 | 4 | 3 | 3 | 3 | 3 | 3 | 4 | 4 | 2 | 2 | 4 | 4 | 3 | 2 | 3 | 2 | 2 | 2 | 2 | 2 | 2 | 2 | 2 |

Source: ForaDeJogo
A = Away; H = Home; W = Win; D = Draw; L = Loss

==== Matches ====
| 20 August 1995 1 | Benfica | Postponed | Salgueiros | Lisbon |
| | | Report | | Stadium: Estádio da Luz |

| 26 August 1995 2 | Tirsense | 0–1 | Benfica | Santo Tirso |
| 20:00 | | | Panduru 49' | Stadium: Abel Alves de Figueiredo; Attendance: 10,000; Referee: Veiga Trigo |

| 6 September 1995 1 | Benfica | 0–0 | Salgueiros | Lisbon |
| 19:45 | | | | Stadium: Estádio da Luz; Attendance: 6,000; Referee: José Rufino |

| 9 September 1995 3 | Benfica | 1–1 | Vitória Guimarães | Lisbon |
| 19:45 | Hassan 59' | | Ricardo Lopes 90' | Stadium: Estádio da Luz; Attendance: 15,000; Referee: José Pratas |

| 17 September 1995 4 | Estrela da Amadora | 0–1 | Benfica | Lisbon |
| 19:00 | | | João Pinto 28' | Stadium: Estádio da Reboleira; Attendance: 4,000; Referee: Pinto Correia |

| 22 September 1995 5 | Benfica | 1–0 | Belenenses | Lisbon |
| 19:00 | Marcelo 84' | | | Stadium: Estádio da Luz; Attendance: 15,000; Referee: Vítor Pereira |

| 4 October 1995 6 | Sporting | 2–0 | Benfica | Lisbon |
| 21:00 | Pedro Barbosa 49'; Emmanuel Amuneke 83' | | | Stadium: Estádio de Alvalade; Attendance: 40,000; Referee: Veiga Trigo |

| 14 October 1995 7 | Benfica | 3–0 | Gil Vicente | Lisbon |
| 18:00 | Panduru 21'; Hélder 45'; Hassan 64' (pen.) | | | Stadium: Estádio da Luz; Attendance: 10,000; Referee: Isidoro Rodrigues |

| 22 October 1995 8 | Desp. Chaves | 1–2 | Benfica | Chaves |
| 19:15 | Rui Loja 68' | | Valdo 75'; Hassan 78' | Stadium: Estádio Municipal de Chaves; Attendance: 17,000; Referee: Paulo Paraty |

| 27 October 1995 9 | Benfica | 4–1 | Leça | Lisbon |
| 19:45 | Paulão 41'; Iliev 44'; Alfaia 64' (o.g.); Hassan 80' | | Paredão 63' (o.g.) | Stadium: Estádio da Luz; Attendance: 7,000; Referee: Daniel Alberto Soares |

| 5 November 1995 10 | Porto | 3–0 | Benfica | Porto |
| 20:30 | Domingos 42', 85' (pen.); Péter Lipcsei 88' | | | Stadium: Estádio das Antas; Attendance: 40,000; Referee: Bento Marques |

| 18 November 1995 11 | Benfica | 1–1 | Boavista | Lisbon |
| 20:00 | Hassan 90' | | Artur 19' | Stadium: Estádio da Luz; Attendance: 25,000; Referee: José Pratas |

| 26 November 1995 12 | Braga | 1–2 | Benfica | Braga |
| 19:45 | Bo Andersson 25' | | João Pinto 30' (pen.); Hassan 35' | Stadium: Estádio 1º de Maio; Attendance: 10,000; Referee: Lucilio Baptista |

| 9 December 1995 13 | Benfica | 2–0 | Campomaiorense | Lisbon |
| 19:45 | Edgar Pacheco 68'; Marcelo 85' | | | Stadium: Estádio da Luz; Attendance: 15,000; Referee: Cunha Antunes |

| 16 December 1995 14 | Farense | 1–3 | Benfica | Faro |
| 19:45 | Hajry Redouane 13' | | Ricardo Gomes 34'; Paulo Bento 56'; João Pinto 82' | Stadium: Estádio de São Luís; Attendance: 14,000; Referee: Bento Marques |

| 22 December 1995 15 | Felgueiras | 1–2 | Benfica | Felgueiras |
| 19:45 | Lewis 32' | | Edgar Pacheco 48'; Ricardo Gomes 72' | Stadium: Estádio Dr. Machado de Matos; Attendance: 10,000; Referee: Carlos Calheiros |

| 29 December 1995 16 | Benfica | 4–0 | União de Leiria | Lisbon |
| 19:45 | Marinho 13'; João Pinto 62'; Ricardo Gomes 76'; Panduru 81' | | | Stadium: Estádio da Luz; Attendance: 30,000; Referee: Paulo Costa |

| 6 January 1996 17 | Maritimo | 2–2 | Benfica | Funchal |
| 19:00 | Alex Bunbury 21'; Carlos Jorge 78' | Report | Marcelo 16'; João Pinto 68' | Stadium: Estádio dos Barreiros; Attendance: 10,000; Referee: Lucílio Baptista |

| 12 January 1996 18 | Salgueiros | 4–2 | Benfica | Porto |
| 20:45 | Nandinho 36'; Abílio 49' (pen.); Nilton 79'; Basílio Almeida 87' | Report | Valdo 55' (pen.); Marcelo 89' | Stadium: Estádio Prof. Dr. José Vieira de Carvalho; Attendance: 5,000; Referee: José Pratas |

| 20 January 1996 19 | Benfica | 2–1 | Tirsense | Lisbon |
| 19:30 | João Pinto 61'; Dimas Teixeira 77' | Report | Rui Manuel 56' | Stadium: Estádio da Luz; Attendance: 25,000; Referee: António Costa |

| 27 January 1996 20 | Vitória Guimarães | 2–4 | Benfica | Guimarães |
| 19:00 | Zlatko Zahovič 10'; Ricardo Lopes 17' | Report | João Pinto 48', 86'; Marcelo 50'; Hélder 58' | Stadium: Estádio D. Afonso Henriques; Attendance: 5,000; Referee: António Rola |

| 4 February 1996 21 | Benfica | 1–0 | Estrela da Amadora | Lisbon |
| 18:15 | Paulão 46' | Report | | Stadium: Estádio da Luz; Attendance: 15,000; Referee: Vitor Reis |

| 11 February 1996 22 | Belenenses | 1–0 | Benfica | Lisbon |
| 21:00 | Giovanella 62' | Report | | Stadium: Estádio do Restelo; Attendance: 5,000; Referee: Bento Marques |

| 17 February 1996 23 | Benfica | 0–0 | Sporting | Lisbon |
| 20:00 | | Report | | Stadium: Estádio da Luz; Attendance: 20,000; Referee: Paulo Paraty |

| 2 March 1996 24 | Gil Vicente | 1–2 | Benfica | Braga |
| 20:15 | Jaime Cerqueira 13' | Report | João Pinto 6'; Marcelo 45' | Stadium: Estádio 1º de Maio; Attendance: 10,000; Referee: Isidoro Rodrigues |

| 9 March 1996 25 | Benfica | 2–0 | Desp. Chaves | Lisbon |
| 20:00 | João Pinto 32'; Marcelo 36' | Report | | Stadium: Estádio da Luz; Attendance: 4,000; Referee: João Mesquita |

| 17 March 1996 26 | Leça | 0–0 | Benfica | Leça da Palmeira |
| 19:00 | | Report | | Stadium: Estádio do Leça FC; Attendance: 5,000; Referee: Lucílio Baptista |

| 23 March 1996 27 | Benfica | 2–1 | Porto | Lisbon |
| 20:00 | Valdo 14' (pen.); João Pinto 52' | Report | Emerson 51' | Stadium: Estádio da Luz; Attendance: 50,000; Referee: António Rola |

| 30 March 1996 28 | Boavista | 1–3 | Benfica | Porto |
| 20:00 | Artur 85' | Report | Ricardo Gomes 1'; João Pinto 67', 75' | Stadium: Estádio do Bessa; Attendance: 10,000; Referee: Bento Marques |

| 5 April 1996 29 | Benfica | 3–0 | Braga | Lisbon |
| 19:00 | Daniel Kenedy 9'; João Pinto 43' (pen.), 73' (pen.) | Report | | Stadium: Estádio da Luz; Attendance: 15,000; Referee: Antonio Costa |

| 14 April 1996 30 | Campomaiorense | 0–0 | Benfica | Campo Maior |
| 20:30 | | Report | | Stadium: Estádio Capitão Cesar Correia; Attendance: 12,000; Referee: Martins dos Santos |

| 21 April 1996 31 | Benfica | 0–1 | Farense | Lisbon |
| 20:00 | | Report | Jorge Soares 90' | Stadium: Estádio da Luz; Attendance: 20,000; Referee: José Pratas |

| 28 April 1996 32 | Benfica | 1–0 | Felgueiras | Lisbon |
| 20:30 | Paulão 60' | Report | | Stadium: Estádio da Luz; Attendance: 15,000; Referee: Monteiro da Silva |

| 5 May 1996 33 | União de Leiria | 0–2 | Benfica | Leiria |
| 20:30 | | Report | Paulo Bento 44'; Valdo 89' | Stadium: Estádio Dr. Magalhães Pessoa; Attendance: 10,000; Referee: Daniel Soares |

| 12 May 1996 34 | Benfica | 5–1 | Maritimo | Lisbon |
| 17:00 | João Pinto 7', 69', 74'; Dimas Teixeira 19'; Paredão 90' | Report | Alex Bunbury 80' | Stadium: Estádio da Luz; Attendance: 15,000; Referee: José Rufino |

=== Taça de Portugal ===
| 1 December 1995 Fourth Rd | Tirsense | 0–2 | Benfica | Santo Tirso |
| 18:00 | | Report | João Pinto 7', 72' | Stadium: Abel Alves de Figueiredo; Attendance: 10,000; Referee: Juvenal Silvestre |

| 31 January 1996 Sixth Rd | Farense | 1–1 (a.e.t.) | Benfica | Faro |
| 19:45 | Christian 73' | Report | Marcelo 71' | Stadium: Estádio de São Luís; Attendance: 12,000; Referee: Veiga Trigo |

| 14 February 1996 6R Replay | Benfica | 3–0 | Farense | Lisbon |
| 20:30 | Mauro Airez 60', 68'; Marcelo 81' | Report | | Stadium: Estádio da Luz; Referee: José Leirós |

| 25 February 1996 Quarter-finals | Benfica | 1–0 (a.e.t.) | Vitória Guimarães | Lisbon |
| 20:30 | Marcelo 98' | Report | | Stadium: Estádio da Luz; Referee: Martins dos Santos |

| 10 April 1996 Semi-finals | Benfica | 2–0 (a.e.t.) | União de Leiria | Lisbon |
| 20:30 | Marcelo 113', 119' | Report | Crespo (yellow card) 61' (yellow-red card) 81'; Hugo (yellow card) 66' (yellow-red card) 84' | Stadium: Estádio da Luz; Referee: Lucílio Baptista |

| 18 May 1996 Final | Benfica | 3–1 | Sporting | Lisbon |
| 20:30 | Mauro Airez 9'; João Pinto 39', 67' | Report | Carlos Xavier 83' (pen.) | Stadium: Estádio Nacional; Attendance: 50,000; Referee: Vítor Pereira |

=== UEFA Cup ===
==== First round ====
| 12 September 1995 First leg | Lierse SK (Belgium) | 1–3 | (Portugal) Benfica | Lier |
| | Huysmans 39' (pen.) | Report | Valdo 28' (pen.); Marcelo 54'; Paulo Bento 64' | Stadium: Herman Vanderpoortenstadion; Referee: Anders Frisk |

| 26 September 1995 Second leg | Benfica (Portugal) | 2–1 (5–2 agg.) | (Belgium) Lierse SK | Lisbon |
| 19:00 | João Pinto 24'; Kenedy 60' | Report | van Kerckhoven 33' | Stadium: Estádio da Luz; Referee: Philippe Leduc |

==== Second round ====
| 17 October 1995 First leg | Benfica (Portugal) | 1–0 | (Netherlands) Roda JC | Lisbon |
| 19:00 | Panduru 78' | Report | | Stadium: Estádio da Luz; Attendance: 20,000; Referee: Periklis Vassilakis |

| 31 October 1995 Second leg | Roda JC (Netherlands) | 2–2 (2–3 agg.) | (Portugal) Benfica | Kerkrade |
| 19:00 | Hesp 60'; Trost 72' | Report | Nader 85', 90' | Stadium: Parkstad Limburg Stadion; Referee: Serge Muhmenthaler |

==== Third round ====
| 21 November 1995 First leg | Bayern Munich (Germany) | 4–1 | (Portugal) Benfica | Munich |
| 19:00 | Klinsmann 26', 31', 44', 46' | Report | Dimas 30' | Stadium: Olympiastadion; Attendance: 60,000; Referee: Dermot Gallagher |

| 5 December 1995 Second leg | (Portugal) Benfica | 1–3 (2–7 agg.) | Bayern Munich (Germany) | Lisbon |
| 19:00 | Valdo 14' | Report | Klinsmann 32', 68'; Herzog 83' | Stadium: Estádio da Luz; Attendance: 60,000; Referee: Peter Mikkelsen |

=== Friendlies ===
| 27 July 1995 UBank Challenge | Kaizer Chiefs | 1–0 | Benfica | Pretoria |
| | Fani Madida 75' | | | Stadium: Loftus Versfeld Stadium |

| 30 July 1995 UBank Challenge | Benfica | 0–0 (4–3 p) | Leeds United | Johannesburg |
| | | | | Stadium: Ellis Park Stadium |

| 4 August 1995 Parmalat Cup | Boca Juniors | 1–1 (4–3 p) | Benfica | East Rutherford, New Jersey |
| | Luis Medero 75' | | 17' Valdo | Stadium: Giants Stadium |

| 6 August 1995 Parmalat Cup | USA | 2–1 | Benfica | East Rutherford, New Jersey |
| | Klopaso 13' (pen.); Lassiter 66' | | 63' Illiev | Stadium: Giants Stadium; Attendance: 32,859 |

| 13 August 1995 | Benfica | 0–1 | Fiorentina | Lisbon |
| | | | Rui Costa | Stadium: Estádio da Luz |

| 18 August 1995 Teresa Herrera | Real Madrid | 2–0 | Benfica | A Coruña |
| | Amavisca 70'; Raúl 71' | | | Stadium: Estadio Riazor; Referee: Arturo Daudén Ibáñez |

| 19 August 1995 Teresa Herrera | Flamengo | 2–1 | Benfica | A Coruña |
| | Romário 3', 13' | | 12' João Pinto | Stadium: Estadio Riazor; Attendance: 15,000; Referee: José López de la Fuente |

== Player statistics ==
The squad for the season consisted of the players listed in the tables below, as well as staff member Artur Jorge (manager), Zoran Filipovic (assistant manager) and Mário Wilson (manager).

Note 1: Note: Flags indicate national team as defined under FIFA eligibility rules. Players may hold more than one non-FIFA nationality.

Note 2: Players with squad numbers marked ‡ joined the club during the 1995–96 season via transfer, with more details in the following section.

| No. | Pos | Nat | Player | Total | | Primeira Divisão | | Taça de Portugal | | UEFA Cup | |
| No. | Pos | Nat | Player | Apps | Goals | Apps | Goals | Apps | Goals | Apps | Goals |
|---|---|---|---|---|---|---|---|---|---|---|---|
| 1 | GK | (Belgium) BEL | Michel Preud'homme | 45 | -37 | 33 | -24 | 6 | -2 | 6 | -11 |
| 2 | DF | (Brazil) BRA | Paulo Pereira | 11 | 0 | 7 | 0 | 0 | 0 | 4 | 0 |
| 3^{‡} | DF | (Brazil) BRA | Ricardo Gomes | 37 | 4 | 29 | 4 | 5 | 0 | 3 | 0 |
| 4 | DF | (Portugal) POR | Hélder Cristóvão | 43 | 2 | 31 | 2 | 6 | 0 | 6 | 0 |
| 5^{‡} | DF | (Brazil) BRA | Paredão | 12 | 1 | 8 | 1 | 2 | 0 | 2 | 0 |
| 6 | MF | (Portugal) POR | Paulo Bento | 40 | 3 | 29 | 2 | 6 | 0 | 5 | 1 |
| 7^{‡} | MF | (Portugal) POR | José Calado | 22 | 0 | 14 | 0 | 4 | 0 | 4 | 0 |
| 8 | MF | (Portugal) POR | João Vieira Pinto | 42 | 23 | 31 | 18 | 6 | 4 | 5 | 1 |
| 9^{‡} | FW | (Morocco) MAR | Hassan Nader | 14 | 8 | 10 | 6 | 1 | 0 | 3 | 2 |
| 10^{‡} | MF | (Brazil) BRA | Valdo Filho | 39 | 6 | 30 | 4 | 6 | 0 | 3 | 2 |
| 11^{‡} | MF | (Romania) ROU | Basarab Panduru | 19 | 4 | 15 | 3 | 1 | 0 | 3 | 1 |
| 13 | DF | (Portugal) POR | Dimas Teixeira | 41 | 3 | 30 | 2 | 6 | 0 | 5 | 1 |
| 14^{‡} | DF | (Portugal) POR | Marinho | 24 | 1 | 18 | 1 | 3 | 0 | 3 | 0 |
| 15 | FW | (Brazil) BRA | Aílton Delfino | 5 | 0 | 4 | 0 | 0 | 0 | 1 | 0 |
| 16^{‡} | DF | (Brazil) BRA | King | 1 | 0 | 0 | 0 | 0 | 0 | 1 | 0 |
| 17 | DF | (Portugal) POR | Pedro Henriques | 19 | 0 | 16 | 0 | 2 | 0 | 1 | 0 |
| 18 | MF | (Portugal) POR | Edgar Pacheco | 31 | 2 | 21 | 2 | 4 | 0 | 6 | 0 |
| 19 | MF | (Portugal) POR | Bruno Caires | 23 | 0 | 16 | 0 | 4 | 0 | 3 | 0 |
| 20^{‡} | MF | (Bulgaria) BUL | Ilian Iliev | 24 | 1 | 19 | 1 | 5 | 0 | 0 | 0 |
| 21^{‡} | FW | (Brazil) BRA | Luiz Gustavo | 14 | 0 | 14 | 0 | 0 | 0 | 0 | 0 |
| 25^{‡} | FW | (Brazil) BRA | Marcelo | 39 | 13 | 27 | 7 | 6 | 5 | 6 | 1 |
| 22 | MF | (Portugal) POR | Daniel Kenedy | 30 | 2 | 22 | 1 | 3 | 0 | 5 | 1 |
| 23^{‡} | MF | (Angola) ANG | Paulão | 20 | 3 | 18 | 3 | 2 | 0 | 0 | 0 |
| 24^{‡} | GK | (Portugal) POR | Fernando Brassard | 2 | -4 | 2 | -4 | 0 | 0 | 0 | 0 |
| 26 | DF | (Portugal) POR | Nélson Veríssimo | 3 | 0 | 3 | 0 | 0 | 0 | 0 | 0 |
| 27 | MF | (Portugal) POR | Maniche | 2 | 0 | 0 | 0 | 0 | 0 | 2 | 0 |
| 30^{‡} | FW | (Argentina) ARG | Mauro Airez | 28 | 3 | 24 | 0 | 4 | 3 | 0 | 0 |

== Transfers ==
=== In ===
| Entry date | Position | Player | From club |
|---|---|---|---|
| July 1995 | AM | Valdo Filho | Paris SG |
| July 1995 | CB | Ricardo Gomes | Paris SG |
| July 1995 | CM | José Calado | Estrela da Amadora |
| July 1995 | ST | Marcelo | Tirsense |
| July 1995 | RB | Marinho | Sporting |
| July 1995 | ST | Hassan | Farense |
| July 1995 | CM | Ilian Iliev | Levski Sofia |
| July 1995 | AM | Basarab Panduru | Steaua București |
| July 1995 | FW | Mauro Airez | Belenenses |
| July 1995 | RW | Paulão | Vitória Setúbal |
| July 1995 | GK | Fernando Brassard | Gil Vicente |
| July 1995 | CB | Paredão | Tirsense |
| July 1995 | FW | Luiz Gustavo | Belenenses |
| July 1995 | ST | Aílton Delfino | São Paulo |

=== In by loan ===
| Entry date | Position | Player | From club | Return date |
|---|---|---|---|---|
| July 1995 | CB | King | Farense | 30 June 1996 |

=== Out ===
| Exit date | Position | Player | To club |
|---|---|---|---|
| July 1995 | GK | Neno | Vitória Guimarães |
| July 1995 | LB | António Veloso | Retired |
| July 1995 | CB | William | Bastia |
| July 1995 | FB | Abel Xavier | Bari |
| July 1995 | CB | Paulo Madeira | Belenenses |
| July 1995 | CB | Paulão | Vasco da Gama |
| July 1995 | CB | Carlos Mozer | Kashima Antlers |
| July 1995 | CM | José Tavares | Boavista |
| July 1995 | RW | Amaral | Felgueiras |
| July 1995 | RW | Vítor Paneira | Vitória Guimarães |
| July 1995 | CM | Nelo | Boavista |
| July 1995 | AM | Mario Stanić | Club Brugge |
| July 1995 | CM | Rui Esteves | Belenenses |
| July 1995 | ST | Edílson | Palmeiras |
| July 1995 | ST | Claudio Caniggia | Boca Juniors |
| July 1995 | FW | Isaías | Coventry City |
| July 1995 | ST | César Brito | Belenenses |
| December 95 | ST | Aílton Delfino | São Paulo |

=== Out by loan ===
| Exit date | Position | Player | To club | Return date |
|---|---|---|---|---|
| July 1995 | ST | Akwá | Alverca | 30 June 1997 |
| December 95 | AM | Basarab Panduru | Neuchâtel Xamax | 30 June 1996 |
