= Luiz Gustavo (footballer, born 1972) =

Brazilian footballer

Personal information
- Full name: Luiz Gustavo Silva de Aviz
- Date of birth: 23 February 1972 (age 54)
- Place of birth: Belo Horizonte, Brazil
- Height: 1.79 m (5 ft 10 in)
- Position: Forward

Youth career
- 1989−1990: Cruzeiro

Senior career*
Years	Team	Apps	(Gls)
1991	Cruzeiro		
1991−1995	Belenenses	88	(18)
1995−1996	Benfica	14	(0)
1996−1997	Internacional		
1997	Vitória		
1998	Brasil de Pelotas		
1999	Mogi Mirim		
2000	União Barbarense		
2000	Fluminense		
2001	São José (PA)		
2002	Joinville		
2005−2006	Novo Hamburgo		
2007	Remo		

International career
1989	Brazil U20	3	(0)
- * Club domestic league appearances and goals

Luiz Gustavo Silva de Aviz (born 23 February 1972), commonly known as Luiz Gustavo is a former Brazilian footballer who played as a forward.

== Club career ==
Born in Belo Horizonte, Gustavo is a youth product of Cruzeiro Esporte Clube, where he spent one year, alongside Ramon.

In 1991, at age 19, Gustavo moved to Portugal to play for C.F. Os Belenenses, at the time competing in the second tier. He scored nine goals in 23 games, helping the Lisbon-side promote to the Primeira Divisão. In the next three years, Gustavo was a regular starter at Belenenses, with his best season being in 1994-95 with four goals.

In 1995, he moved to S.L. Benfica, debuting on 9 September 1995, in a home draw with S.C. Salgueiros. With only two starts in 14 appearances during the 1995–96 season, he moved to Internacional to regain more playing time. He then represented nearly ten other clubs, the larger being Fluminense FC, retiring in 2007 at age 35.

== International career ==
He represented Brazil U20 in the 1989 FIFA U20, which ended in a semi-finals loss against Portugal U20.
