= Daniel (footballer, born 1961) =

Macanese footballer

Daniel Augusto Caetano Dias
Personal information
- Full name: Daniel Augusto Caetano Dias
- Date of birth: 17 April 1961 (age 65)
- Place of birth: Praia, Portuguese Cape Verde
- Height: 1.78 m (5 ft 10 in)
- Position: Defender

Senior career*
Years	Team	Apps	(Gls)
1985–1986	Marco		
1986–1987	Fafe	24	(2)
1987–1988	Felgueiras	27	(2)
1988–1990	Académica	18	(0)
1990–1993	Feirense	84	(0)
1993–1994	Aves	19	(1)
1994–1995	Torres Novas	23	(1)
1995–1996	Guangdong Hongyuan	24	(1)
2001	Po Chai Pills		
2002	Lam Pak		
2003	Monte Carlo		
2005	South China		
2006–2007	Kuan Tai		

International career
1997–2000	Macau	5	(0)
- * Club domestic league appearances and goals

Daniel Augusto Caetano Dias (born 17 April 1961), better known as Daniel, is a retired footballer who played as a defender. Born in Praia. He started his football career in Portugal, then moved to Macau, which was Portuguese as well and is now a special administrative region of China. He also played in China as well, for Guangdong Hongyuan. He is also a former Macanese international footballer.

== Career statistics ==
=== Club ===
Club	Season	League			Cup		Other		Total	
Club	Season	Division	Apps	Goals	Apps	Goals	Apps	Goals	Apps	Goals
Fafe	1986–87	Segunda Divisão	24	2	2 (Note: Appearances in the Taça de Portugal)	0	0	0	26	2
Felgueiras	1987–88	Segunda Divisão	27	1	1	0	0	0	28	1
Académica	1988–89	Segunda Divisão	12	0	2	0	0	0	14	0
Académica	1989–90	Segunda Divisão	6	0	0	0	0	0	6	0
Académica	Total		18	0	2	0	0	0	20	0
Feirense	1990–91	Segunda Divisão de Honra	33	0	6	0	0	0	39	0
Feirense	1991–92	Segunda Divisão de Honra	29	0	1	0	0	0	30	0
Feirense	1992–93	Segunda Divisão de Honra	22	0	1	0	0	0	23	0
Feirense	Total		84	0	8	0	0	0	92	0
Aves	1993–94	Segunda Divisão de Honra	19	1	2	0	0	0	21	1
Torres Novas	1994–95	Segunda Divisão B	23	1	2	0	0	0	25	1
Guangdong Hongyuan	1995	Jia-A League	14	1	0	0	0	0	14	1
Guangdong Hongyuan	1996	Jia-A League	10	0	0	0	0	0	10	0
Guangdong Hongyuan	Total		24	1	0	0	0	0	24	0
Career total			219	6	17	0	0	0	236	6

=== International ===
National team	Year	Apps	Goals
Macau	1997	3	0
Macau	2000	2	0
Total		5	0

== Photo ==
https://danielaugustocaetanodias.blogspot.com/2021/08/daniel-augusto-caetano-dias.html

https://danielaugustocaetanodias.blogspot.com/p/blog-page.html
