= Sergio Pinto =

Sergio Pinto may refer to:

- Sérgio Sousa Pinto (born 1972), Portuguese politician
- Sérgio Pinto (footballer, born 1973), Portuguese football midfielder
- Sérgio Pinto (footballer, born 1980), Portuguese football midfielder
