= Agostinho Caetano =

Portuguese footballer

Personal information
- Full name: Agostinho Manuel Almeida Caetano
- Date of birth: 9 December 1966 (age 59)
- Place of birth: Penafiel, Portugal
- Height: 1.62 m (5 ft 4 in)
- Position: Forward

Youth career
- 1980–1984: Penafiel
- 1984–1985: Porto

Senior career*
Years	Team	Apps	(Gls)
1985–1989	Penafiel	117	(7)
1989–1990	Porto	1	(0)
1990–1996	Tirsense	183	(31)
1996–1997	Espinho	19	(2)
Total		320	(40)

International career
1995	Portugal	2	(0)
- * Club domestic league appearances and goals

Agostinho Manuel Almeida Caetano (born 9 December 1966) is a Portuguese former professional footballer who played as a forward.

== Club career ==
Caetano was born in Penafiel, Porto District. Over nine seasons, he amassed Primeira Liga totals of 226 games and 21 goals, mainly with F.C. Tirsense (four years). In 1993–94, he scored a career-best 11 goals in 32 matches with his main club, as the campaign ended in promotion from the Segunda Liga.

Caetano retired in 1997 at the age of 30, after one season with S.C. Espinho in the top tier.

== International career ==
Whilst a Tirsense player, Caetano won two caps for Portugal in late January 1995, during the SkyDome Cup. His first arrived on the 26th, as he played 62 minutes in a 1–1 draw against hosts Canada.

== Personal life ==
Caetano's son, Rui, was also a footballer and a forward. He played mostly for F.C. Paços de Ferreira.

Caetano retired early to open a real estate company, and his son also quit professional football prematurely to concentrate on business.

== Honours ==
Porto

- Primeira Divisão: 1989–90

Tirsense

- Segunda Divisão: 1993–94
