= Tiago Pinto =

Portuguese footballer

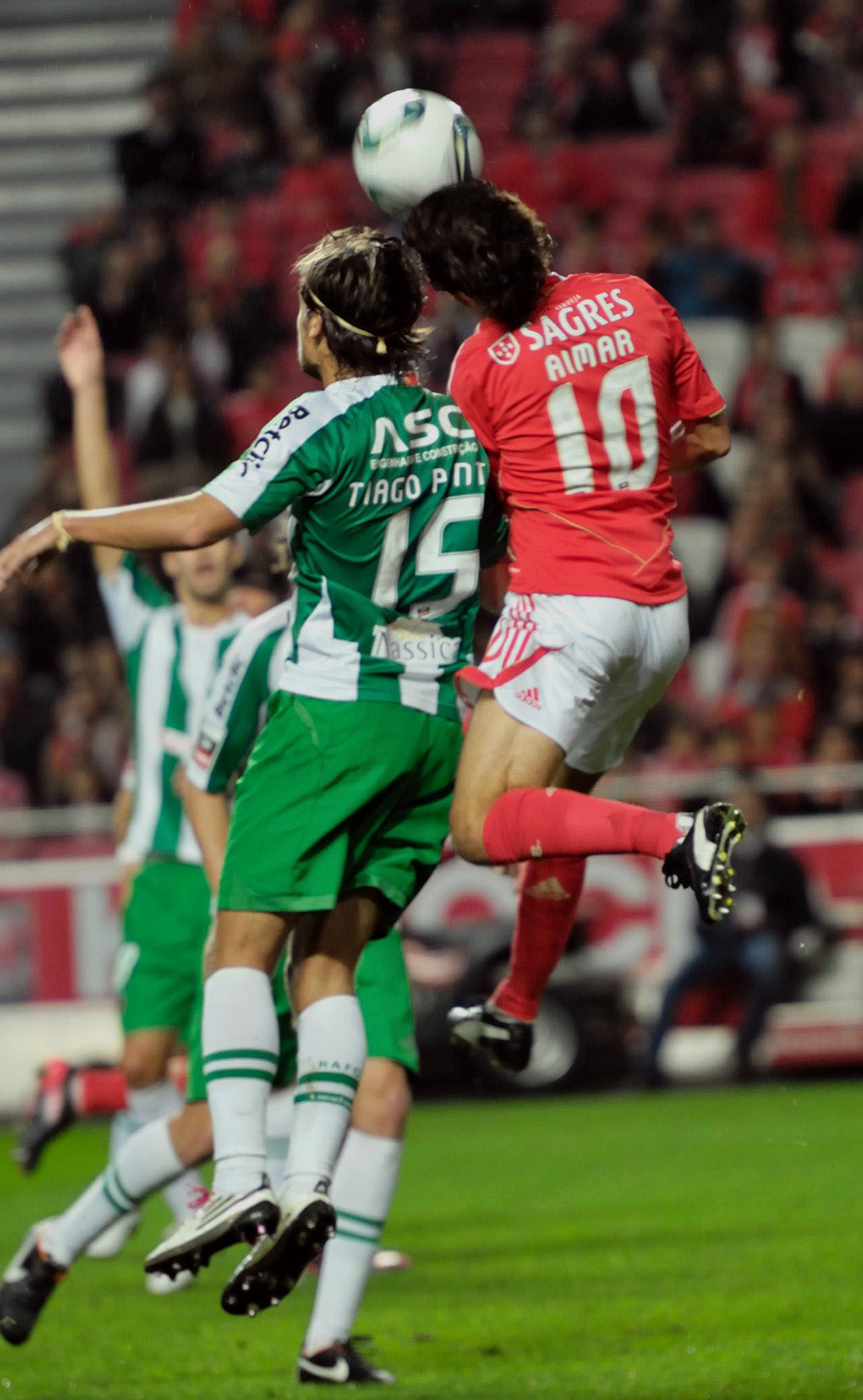
- Pinto (left) with Rio Ave in 2011

Personal information
- Full name: Tiago Miguel Baía Pinto
- Date of birth: 1 February 1988 (age 38)
- Place of birth: Porto, Portugal
- Height: 1.77 m (5 ft 10 in)
- Position: Left-back

Youth career
- 1998–2000: Benfica
- 2000–2007: Sporting CP

Senior career*
Years	Team	Apps	(Gls)
2007–2009	Sporting CP	0	(0)
2007–2008	→ Olivais Moscavide (loan)	36	(2)
2008–2009	→ Trofense (loan)	18	(1)
2009–2010	Braga	0	(0)
2010–2015	Rio Ave	86	(1)
2012–2013	→ Deportivo La Coruña (loan)	1	(0)
2013	→ Racing Santander (loan)	19	(1)
2015–2018	Osmanlıspor	77	(2)
2018–2022	Ankaragücü	103	(1)
Total		340	(8)

International career
2006	Portugal U18	3	(0)
2006–2007	Portugal U19	13	(0)
2008	Portugal U20	7	(2)
2008–2009	Portugal U21	2	(1)
2011	Portugal U23	1	(0)
- * Club domestic league appearances and goals

Tiago Miguel Baía Pinto (born 1 February 1988) is a Portuguese former professional footballer who played as a left-back.

Previously of Sporting CP and Braga, he did not break into the first teams of either club, but did so at Rio Ave, helping them to two domestic cup finals in 2014. He also played several seasons in Turkey's Süper Lig, making over 100 appearances for Osmanlıspor and Ankaragücü.

Pinto was a youth international for Portugal.

== Club career ==
=== Early years ===
Pinto was born in Porto. After receiving his first football lessons at Benfica, both he and his father joined neighbouring Sporting CP, and the 12-year-old went on to complete his development at the Estádio José Alvalade.

For 2007–08, Pinto was loaned to Olivais e Moscavide of the third division, and spent the following campaign with Primeira Liga newcomers Trofense. He scored his first goal in the competition on 18 April 2009, a consolation in a 2–1 away defeat against Rio Ave.

In September 2009, after cutting ties with Sporting, Pinto signed a four-year contract with Braga. In his only season, he made no competitive appearances as the Minho side finished in second position.

=== Rio Ave ===
Pinto was released in summer 2010, and joined fellow top-flight club Rio Ave. He arrived to replace Braga-bound Sílvio, and had previously failed a medical at Vitória de Setúbal.

On 3 September 2012, Pinto was loaned to Spanish side Deportivo de La Coruña for one year, without the option to purchase. He was presented before 200 fans at the Estadio Riazor and joined several compatriots at his new team, making his official debut on 1 November by playing the entirety of a 1–1 home draw with Mallorca in the last-32 stage of the Copa del Rey and also featuring three minutes in place of Juan Domínguez in the goalless second leg four weeks later, with the subsequent elimination on the away goals rule; between those two cup matches he appeared in his only game for them in La Liga, starting and finishing the 5–3 loss at Real Zaragoza.

On 11 January 2013, as he was only third choice at his position behind Ayoze and Evaldo, Pinto's loan at Deportivo ended and he moved to Segunda División's Racing de Santander for the remainder of the campaign. His only goal for the Cantabrians arrived on 23 February, concluding a 2–0 home victory over Mirandés, but the club eventually suffered a second consecutive relegation.

Pinto was an unused substitute as Rio Ave lost the finals of the Taça da Liga and the Taça de Portugal in 2014 to Benfica. He played against the same team in that year's Supertaça Cândido de Oliveira, missing in the penalty shootout to hand the opposition the title.

=== Turkey ===
In July 2015, Pinto signed for Osmanlıspor, newly promoted to Turkey's Süper Lig. In his first season in Ankara, the side came fifth and qualified for the UEFA Europa League. He scored his first goal on 28 July 2016, the only one of a home win against Nõmme Kalju in the competition's third qualifying round, and in the play-off on 25 August he netted both of a defeat of Midtjylland also at the Osmanlı Stadium.

Pinto moved on a three-year contract to another promoted team in the Turkish capital in July 2018, Ankaragücü. In his second match on 19 August, he concluded a 2–0 win at Alanyaspor.

== International career ==
Pinto won 25 caps for Portugal at youth level, including two for the under-21s. He was called up to the full side for the first time on 31 March 2015 for a friendly with Cape Verde, remaining on the bench in the 2–0 defeat in Estoril.

== Personal life ==
Pinto is the son of João Pinto, whom successfully represented Benfica, Sporting and the Portugal national team. In June 2009, he married Bárbara Brilhante at the Jerónimos Monastery in Lisbon, and the couple have a son and a daughter together.

Pinto's uncle, Sérgio, competed mostly in the Portuguese lower divisions, also spending a season at England's Bradford City.

== See also ==
- List of association football families
