= 1998–99 Sheffield United F.C. season =

Sheffield United
1998–99 season
- Chairman: Mike McDonald
- Manager: Steve Bruce
- Stadium: Bramall Lane
- First Division: 8th
- FA Cup: Fifth round
- League Cup: Second round
- Top goalscorer: League: Marcelo (16); All: Marcelo (20)
- Average home league attendance: 16,243

During the 1998–99 English football season, Sheffield United competed in the Football League First Division.

== Season summary ==
The 1998–99 season saw more managerial change, with Steve Bruce taking over first team affairs. The Blades challenged once again for a play-off place but eventually finished eighth. However, there was drama in the FA Cup where the Blades were controversially beaten by Arsenal when Bruce attempted to take his team off the pitch, claiming that Arsenal had broken an unwritten rule of sportsmanship by failing to return the ball to the Blades, who had intentionally kicked it out of play to allow an injured player to be attended to. Although the game eventually continued to a finish, it was later declared void and replayed; United lost. In May, Bruce resigned after just one season in charge, citing turmoil in the club's boardroom and a shortage of funds for transfers.

== Final league table ==
Pos	Team	Pld	W	D	L	GF	GA	GD	Pts	Qualification or relegation
6	Bolton Wanderers	46	20	16	10	78	59	+19	76	Qualification for the First Division play-offs
7	Wolverhampton Wanderers	46	19	16	11	64	43	+21	73	
8	Sheffield United	46	18	13	15	71	66	+5	67	
9	Norwich City	46	15	17	14	62	61	+1	62	
10	Huddersfield Town	46	15	16	15	62	71	−9	61	

Rules for classification: 1) Points; 2) Goals scored; 3) Goal difference

== Results ==
Sheffield United's score comes first

=== Legend ===
Win	Draw	Loss

=== Football League First Division ===
Date	Opponent	Venue	Result	Attendance	Scorers
8 August 1998	Swindon Town	H	2–1	15,977	Stuart, Borbokis
15 August 1998	West Bromwich Albion	A	1–4	16,901	Saunders
22 August 1998	Birmingham City	H	0–2	17,528	
29 August 1998	Bolton Wanderers	A	2–2	18,263	Saunders, Taylor
31 August 1998	Crewe Alexandra	H	3–1	15,922	Hunt, I Hamilton, Woodhouse
5 September 1998	Huddersfield Town	A	0–1	12,192	
8 September 1998	Grimsby Town	H	3–2	12,293	Marker (2), McDermott (own goal)
12 September 1998	Bradford City	A	2–2	13,169	Saunders, Stuart
19 September 1998	Norwich City	H	2–1	16,155	Marcelo (2)
27 September 1998	Crystal Palace	A	0–1	20,370	
29 September 1998	Watford	A	1–1	9,090	Marker
3 October 1998	Portsmouth	H	2–1	15,386	Saunders, Dellas
17 October 1998	Barnsley	H	1–1	23,180	Quinn
20 October 1998	Stockport County	H	1–1	12,657	Marcelo
24 October 1998	Oxford United	A	2–0	6,586	Saunders, Kachura
31 October 1998	Port Vale	A	3–2	6,737	Stuart, Kachura, Saunders
7 November 1998	Tranmere Rovers	H	2–2	15,844	Saunders, Borbokis
10 November 1998	Wolverhampton Wanderers	A	1–2	20,804	Stuart
14 November 1998	Bury	H	3–1	14,164	Kachura (3)
21 November 1998	Queens Park Rangers	A	2–1	12,558	Stuart, Kachura
28 November 1998	Sunderland	H	0–4	25,612	
5 December 1998	Bristol City	A	0–2	11,134	
11 December 1998	Bury	A	3–3	5,002	Woodhouse, Marcelo (2)
20 December 1998	Ipswich Town	H	1–2	12,944	Devlin
26 December 1998	Birmingham City	A	0–1	22,005	
28 December 1998	Huddersfield Town	H	2–1	17,359	Gray (own goal), Twiss
9 January 1999	Swindon Town	A	2–2	7,583	Stuart, Holdsworth
16 January 1999	Bolton Wanderers	H	1–2	15,787	Campbell
30 January 1999	Crewe Alexandra	A	2–1	5,243	Marcelo, Devlin
6 February 1999	West Bromwich Albion	H	3–0	16,566	Morris, Marcelo (2)
19 February 1999	Bradford City	H	2–2	14,675	Woodhouse, Marcelo
27 February 1999	Norwich City	A	1–1	14,224	Devlin
2 March 1999	Crystal Palace	H	1–1	12,896	Morris
6 March 1999	Watford	H	3–0	15,943	Devlin, Morris, I Hamilton
9 March 1999	Portsmouth	A	0–1	10,287	
13 March 1999	Tranmere Rovers	A	3–2	6,588	Morris, Dellas (2)
20 March 1999	Port Vale	H	3–0	15,515	Devlin, Marcelo, Hunt
26 March 1999	Oxford United	H	1–2	14,115	Marcelo
3 April 1999	Barnsley	A	1–2	17,566	Marcelo
5 April 1999	Wolverhampton Wanderers	H	1–1	21,761	Marcelo
10 April 1999	Stockport County	A	0–1	7,551	
17 April 1999	Queens Park Rangers	H	2–0	14,341	Marcelo (2, 1 pen)
20 April 1999	Grimsby Town	A	2–1	5,109	Campbell (2)
24 April 1999	Sunderland	A	0–0	41,179	
1 May 1999	Bristol City	H	3–1	17,310	Marcelo, Morris (2)
9 May 1999	Ipswich Town	A	1–4	21,689	Donis

=== FA Cup ===
Round	Date	Opponent	Venue	Result	Attendance	Goalscorers
R3	2 January 1999	Notts County	H	1–1	12,264	Marcelo
R3R	23 January 1999	Notts County	A	4–3	7,489	Borbokis, Holdsworth, Marcelo (2)
R4	27 January 1999	Cardiff City	H	4–1	13,296	Devlin, Holdsworth, Morris, Stuart
R5	23 February 1999	Arsenal	A	1–2	37,161	Morris

=== League Cup ===
Round	Date	Opponent	Venue	Result	Attendance	Goalscorers
R1 1st Leg	11 August 1998	Darlington	H	3–1	5,035	Borbokis, Saunders, Taylor
R1 2nd Leg	18 August 1998	Darlington	A	2–2 (won 5–3 on agg)	3,756	Saunders (2)
R2 1st Leg	15 September 1998	Grimsby Town	H	2–1	4,689	I Hamilton, Ford
R2 2nd Leg	22 September 1998	Grimsby Town	A	0–2 (lost 2–3 on agg)	4,287	

== Players ==
=== First-team squad ===
Squad at end of season

Note: Flags indicate national team as defined under FIFA eligibility rules; some limited exceptions apply. Players may hold more than one non-FIFA nationality.

No.	Pos.	Nation	Player
—	GK	ENG	Simon Tracey
—	GK	ENG	Leigh Walker
—	GK	SCO	Andy Goram (Note: Goram was born in Bury, England, but also qualified to represent Scotland internationally through his father and made his international debut for Scotland in October 1985.)
—	GK	IRL	Alan Kelly (Note: Kelly was born in Preston, England, but also qualified to represent the Republic of Ireland internationally through his father and represented them at U-23 level before making his international debut for the Republic of Ireland in 1993.)
—	DF	ENG	Steve Bruce (player-manager)
—	DF	ENG	David Holdsworth
—	DF	ENG	Rob Kozluk
—	DF	ENG	Nicky Marker
—	DF	ENG	Jon O'Connor
—	DF	ENG	Wayne Quinn
—	DF	ENG	Lee Sandford
—	DF	ENG	Chris Wilder
—	DF	GRE	Vasilios Borbokis
—	DF	GRE	Traianos Dellas
—	DF	NOR	Anders Jacobsen
—	DF	NOR	Roger Nilsen
—	DF	CIV	Olivier Tébily
—	MF	ENG	Jon Cullen
—	MF	ENG	Kevin Davies

No.	Pos.	Nation	Player
—	MF	ENG	Shaun Derry
—	MF	ENG	Paul Devlin (Note: Devlin was born in Birmingham, England, but also qualified to represent Scotland internationally through his father and would make his international debut for Scotland in October 2002.)
—	MF	ENG	Des Hamilton (on loan from Newcastle United)
—	MF	ENG	Ian Hamilton
—	MF	ENG	Nick Henry
—	MF	ENG	Bobby Ford
—	MF	ENG	Graham Stuart
—	MF	ENG	Michael Twiss (on loan from Manchester United)
—	MF	ENG	Curtis Woodhouse
—	MF	GRE	Georgios Donis
—	FW	ENG	Andy Campbell (on loan from Middlesbrough)
—	FW	ENG	Jonathan Hunt (on loan from Derby County)
—	FW	ENG	Lee Morris
—	FW	WAL	Dean Saunders
—	FW	WAL	Gareth Taylor (Note: Taylor was born in Weston-super-Mare, England, but also qualified to represent Wales internationally through his father and made his international debut for Wales in 1995.)
—	FW	BLR	Pyotr Kachura
—	FW	BRA	Marcelo
