= Vitor Hugo (footballer, born 2001) =

Brazilian footballer (born 2001)

Personal information
- Full name: Vitor Hugo Batista Araújo de Mendonça
- Date of birth: 27 July 2001 (age 25)
- Place of birth: Goiânia, Brazil
- Height: 1.85 m (6 ft 1 in)
- Position: Goalkeeper

Team information
- Current team: Rio Ave
- Number: 32

Youth career
- 2017–2021: Internacional

Senior career*
Years	Team	Apps	(Gls)
2021–2023	Internacional	0	(0)
2022	→ Figueirense (loan)	0	(0)
2023	→ Vila Nova (loan)	0	(0)
2024	Vila Nova	0	(0)
2025	Azuriz	23	(0)
2025–2026	Lusitânia Lourosa	37	(0)
2026–	Rio Ave	1	(0)
- * Club domestic league appearances and goals as of 15:58, 9 October 2026 (UTC)

Vitor Hugo Batista Araújo de Mendonça (born 27 July 2001), known as Vitor Hugo, is a Brazilian professional footballer who plays as a goalkeeper for Portuguese club Rio Ave.

== Career ==
Born in Goiânia, Vítor Hugo was a youth player at Internacional, where he did not make a first-team appearance. He was loaned to Figueirense and Vila Nova before joining the latter club in his hometown. He played for the first half of 2025 with Azuriz in the Campeonato Paranaense and Campeonato Brasileiro Série D.

On 15 July 2025, Vitor Hugo signed a three-year deal at Lusitânia Lourosa in Liga Portugal 2. In April 2026, he told national sports newspaper Record that his inspirations were compatriot Dida and Belgian Thibaut Courtois. He was voted the league's Goalkeeper of the Month for August 2026, keeping a clean sheet in three of four games.

Vitor Hugo transferred to Primeira Liga club Rio Ave on 4 September 2026, on a four-year deal. The fee of €1 million was the most received by Lusitânia Lourosa, who retained 10% of the value of his next transfer. Fifteen days later, he made his top-flight debut at the age of 25, in a 1–0 loss away to Alverca; he started due to a bout of gastroenteritis for Ennio van der Gouw, who had played all previous six games of the season.
