= Marcelo (footballer, born 1969) =

Portuguese footballer

Personal information
- Full name: Marcelo dos Santos Cipriano
- Date of birth: 11 October 1969 (age 57)
- Place of birth: Niterói, Brazil
- Height: 1.83 m (6 ft 0 in)
- Position: Striker

Youth career
- 1983–1987: Beira-Mar
- 1987–1988: Académica

Senior career*
| Years | Team | Apps | (Gls) |
| 1988–1991 | Académica | 35 | (5) |
| 1989–1990 | → Sertanense (loan) | | |
| 1991–1992 | Feirense | 31 | (12) |
| 1992–1993 | Gil Vicente | 22 | (3) |
| 1993–1995 | Tirsense | 65 | (26) |
| 1995–1996 | Benfica | 27 | (7) |
| 1996–1997 | Alavés | 23 | (0) |
| 1997–1999 | Sheffield United | 65 | (25) |
| 1999–2002 | Birmingham City | 77 | (24) |
| 2002 | Walsall | 9 | (1) |
| 2002–2004 | Académica | 30 | (5) |
| Total | | 324 | (108) |
- * Club domestic league appearances and goals

Marcelo dos Santos Cipriano (born 11 October 1969), known simply as Marcelo, is a Portuguese former footballer who played as a striker.

He played professionally in Portugal (most notably one season for Benfica), England, where he appeared for three First Division (second-tier) clubs, and Spain.

== Club career ==
=== Académica and Benfica ===
Born in Niterói, Rio de Janeiro to Portuguese parents, Marcelo returned to their homeland still in his teens, entering the youth system of Académica de Coimbra, which loaned him to fourth division team Sertanense in the summer of 1989.

After one season apiece with Académica and Feirense in the Segunda Liga, Marcelo made his Primeira Liga debut with Gil Vicente, scoring three goals for the Barcelos-based club. His most successful period in his adopted nation would be at lowly Tirsense, which he helped to achieve top-flight promotion in 1994, subsequently netting 17 times in 1994–95 as the northerners achieved a best-ever eight-place in the competition.

Marcelo's exploits earned him a transfer to Benfica, finishing his sole season as team top scorer in the league behind João Pinto, but his side did not win any silverware. He then spent one year in the Spanish Segunda División with Alavés, going scoreless in 26 total appearances.

=== England and later years ===
In the following five years, Marcelo played in England, starting in 1997 with Sheffield United, which signed the player for a fee of £400,000. In the FA Cup tournament of his first year, he helped to take the team to the semi-finals after scoring against Coventry City at Highfield Road to set up the (eventually victorious) replay.

Birmingham City acquired Marcelo's services in 1999 for £500,000. He played on the losing side in the 2001 Football League Cup final, coming on as a second-half substitute and netting in the penalty shootout. He reached the First Division play-offs later that year, losing in the semi-finals to Preston North End in another shootout and missing his attempt this time around. He ended his career in the country at Walsall, for whom he played nine times and scored once, against Burnley.

At nearly 33, Marcelo returned to Portugal and first professional club Académica, spending a further two seasons in the top division after which he retired from the game.

== Honours ==
Benfica

- Taça de Portugal: 1995–96

Tirsense

- Segunda Liga: 1993–94

Birmingham City

- Football League Cup runner-up: 2000–01
