= 1993–94 Primeira Divisão =

60th season of top-tier Portuguese football

Primeira Divisão
- Season: 1993–94
- Champions: Benfica; 30th title
- Relegated: Paços de Ferreira; Famalicão; Estoril-Praia
- Champions League: Benfica (group stage)
- Cup Winners' Cup: Porto (first round)
- UEFA Cup: Sporting CP (first round); Boavista (first round); Marítimo (first round)
- Matches: 306
- Goals: 750 (2.45 per match)
- Top goalscorer: Yekini (21 goals)
- Biggest home win: Benfica 8–0 Famalicão (12 March 1994)
- Biggest away win: Famalicão 0–5 Porto (20 February 1994)
- Highest scoring: Sporting CP 3–6 Benfica (14 May 1994)

The 1993–94 Primeira Divisão was the 60th edition of top flight of Portuguese football. It started on 22 August 1993 with a match between Estoril-Praia and Beira-Mar, and ended on 2 June 1994. The league was contested by 18 clubs with Porto as the defending champions.

Benfica won their 30th league title and qualified for the 1994–95 UEFA Champions League group stage. Porto qualified for the 1994–95 European Cup Winners' Cup first round, and Sporting CP, Boavista and Marítimo qualified for the 1994–95 UEFA Cup; in opposite, Paços de Ferreira, Famalicão and Estoril-Praia were relegated to the Liga de Honra. Yekini was the top scorer with 21 goals.

== Promotion and relegation ==
=== Teams relegated to Liga de Honra ===
- Tirsense
- Espinho
- Chaves

Tirsense, Espinho and Chaves, were consigned to the Liga de Honra following their final classification in 1992-93 season.

=== Teams promoted from Liga de Honra ===
- Estrela da Amadora
- União da Madeira
- Vitória de Setúbal

The other three teams were replaced by Estrela da Amadora, União da Madeira, Vitória de Setúbal from the Liga de Honra.

== Teams ==
=== Stadia and locations ===
Location of teams in Primeira Divisão 1993-94 (Mainland)
Location of teams in Primeira Divisão 1993-94 (Madeira)

Team	Head coach	City	Stadium	1992–93 finish
Beira-Mar	(Serbia and Montenegro) Zoran Filipovic	Aveiro	Estádio Mário Duarte	8th
Belenenses	(Brazil) Abel Braga	Lisbon	Estádio do Restelo	7th
Benfica	(Portugal) Toni	Lisbon	Estádio da Luz	2nd
Boavista	(Portugal) Manuel José	Porto	Estádio do Bessa	4th
Braga	(Portugal) António Oliveira	Braga	Estádio Primeiro de Maio	12th
Estoril	(Portugal) Fernando Santos	Estoril	Estádio António Coimbra da Mota	13th
Estrela da Amadora	(Portugal) João Alves	Amadora	Estádio José Gomes	1st in Divisão de Honra
Famalicão	(Portugal) Piruta	Vila Nova de Famalicão	Estádio Municipal 22 de Junho	14th
Farense	(Spain) Paco Fortes	Faro	Estádio de São Luís	6th
Gil Vicente	(Portugal) Vítor Oliveira	Barcelos	Estádio Adelino Ribeiro Novo	9th
Marítimo	(Brazil) Edinho	Funchal	Estádio dos Barreiros	5th
Paços de Ferreira	(Portugal) Vítor Urbano	Paços de Ferreira	Estádio da Mata Real	10th
Porto	(Croatia) Tomislav Ivic	Porto	Estádio das Antas	1st
Salgueiros	(Portugal) Mário Reis	Porto	Estádio Engenheiro Vidal Pinheiro	15th
Sporting	(England) Bobby Robson	Lisbon	Estádio José Alvalade	3rd
União da Madeira	(Brazil) Ernesto Paulo	Funchal	Estádio dos Barreiros	2nd in Divisão de Honra
Vitória de Guimarães	(Portugal) Bernardino Pedroto	Guimarães	Estádio D. Afonso Henriques	11th
Vitória de Setúbal	(Portugal) Raul Águas	Setúbal	Estádio do Bonfim	3rd in Divisão de Honra

=== Managerial changes ===
Team	Outgoing manager	Date of vacancy	Position in table	Incoming manager	Date of appointment
Belenenses	(Brazil) Abel Braga	16 October 1993	9th	(Portugal) José António	24 October 1993
Famalicão	(Portugal) Piruta	21 November 1993	17th	(Brazil) Abel Braga	28 November 1993
Sporting	(England) Bobby Robson	30 November 1993	2nd	(Portugal) Carlos Queiroz	5 December 1993
Marítimo	(Brazil) Edinho	19 December 1993	6th	(Brazil) Paulo Autuori	30 December 1993
Porto	(Croatia) Tomislav Ivic	23 January 1994	3rd	(England) Bobby Robson	6 February 1994
Belenenses	(Portugal) José António	23 January 1994	12th	(Portugal) José Romão	6 February 1994
Paços de Ferreira	(Portugal) Vítor Urbano	6 March 1994	14th	(Portugal) Jaime Pacheco	13 March 1994
Braga	(Portugal) António Oliveira	13 March 1994	12th	(Portugal) Prof. Neca	27 March 1994
Paços de Ferreira	(Portugal) Jaime Pacheco	8 May 1994	16th	(Portugal) Carlos Padrão	15 May 1994

== League table ==
Pos	Team	Pld	W	D	L	GF	GA	GD	Pts	Qualification or relegation
1	Benfica (C)	34	23	8	3	73	25	+48	54	Qualification to Champions League group stage
2	Porto	34	21	10	3	56	15	+41	52	Qualification to Cup Winners' Cup first round (Note: Porto qualified for the Cup Winners' Cup as Portuguese Cup winners)
3	Sporting CP	34	23	5	6	71	29	+42	51	Qualification to UEFA Cup first round
4	Boavista	34	16	6	12	46	31	+15	38	Qualification to UEFA Cup first round
5	Marítimo	34	13	12	9	45	40	+5	38	Qualification to UEFA Cup first round
6	Vitória de Setúbal	34	14	6	14	56	42	+14	34	
7	Vitória de Guimarães	34	11	11	12	30	31	−1	33	
8	Farense	34	13	7	14	44	46	−2	33	
9	Estrela da Amadora	34	9	15	10	39	36	+3	33	
10	Gil Vicente	34	10	11	13	27	47	−20	31	
11	Salgueiros	34	14	3	17	48	56	−8	31	
12	União da Madeira	34	11	9	14	36	42	−6	31	
13	Belenenses	34	12	6	16	39	51	−12	30	
14	Beira-Mar	34	9	11	14	28	38	−10	29	
15	Braga	34	9	10	15	33	43	−10	28	
16	Paços de Ferreira (R)	34	7	12	15	31	49	−18	26	Relegation to Segunda Divisão de Honra
17	Famalicão (R)	34	7	8	19	26	72	−46	22	Relegation to Segunda Divisão de Honra
18	Estoril (R)	34	5	8	21	22	57	−35	18	Relegation to Segunda Divisão de Honra

Source: Primeira Divisão
Rules for classification: 1st points, 2nd head-to-head, 3rd goals average
(C) Champions; (R) Relegated

== Results ==
Home \ Away	BEM	BEL	BEN	BOA	BRA	EST	EdA	FAM	FAR	GVI	MAR	PAÇ	POR	SAL	SCP	UNI	VGU	VSE
Beira-Mar		1–1	1–1	1–1	0–0	0–0	0–1	1–0	3–0	1–0	3–1	0–1	0–2	2–1	0–4	0–0	1–0	2–1
Belenenses	2–0		0–2	2–1	0–0	1–0	2–1	4–0	4–2	1–0	2–1	1–1	0–2	2–3	0–3	2–1	0–0	1–2
Benfica	1–0	3–0		3–1	2–0	1–1	1–1	8–0	4–1	0–0	2–0	2–1	2–0	4–1	2–1	1–0	0–0	2–0
Boavista	2–1	3–0	1–0		1–0	3–0	1–1	3–0	0–1	1–2	3–2	2–0	1–1	3–1	2–1	3–0	1–1	1–0
Braga	2–0	4–2	0–2	0–1		2–1	0–1	2–0	4–0	4–0	0–1	0–0	0–2	4–3	1–1	3–0	0–0	2–1
Estoril	1–0	1–0	0–3	0–2	1–1		3–3	1–1	0–1	1–1	0–1	2–1	0–1	2–3	0–2	0–2	2–1	0–2
Estrela da Amadora	2–2	2–2	0–1	1–1	1–1	3–0		2–0	1–2	3–0	1–1	3–1	0–0	3–1	0–4	2–0	0–1	0–0
Famalicão	2–1	2–3	1–5	0–3	1–0	1–0	0–2		2–1	3–0	0–2	4–1	0–5	1–0	1–1	0–0	1–1	1–1
Farense	2–2	1–0	0–0	1–0	0–0	1–2	1–0	5–0		4–2	0–0	3–0	1–0	4–1	0–1	4–1	0–1	2–1
Gil Vicente	1–1	0–3	0–3	0–0	1–1	2–0	1–0	1–0	0–0		1–0	1–1	1–1	2–0	0–0	0–0	2–1	2–1
Marítimo	0–2	1–2	1–1	1–0	4–0	1–1	0–0	3–2	5–2	0–0		3–3	1–0	2–1	2–1	3–2	2–0	0–0
Paços de Ferreira	1–1	1–1	1–2	1–0	1–0	0–0	1–0	2–0	1–0	3–1	2–2		0–2	0–2	1–2	1–1	2–2	1–1
Porto	0–0	1–0	3–3	1–0	5–0	3–0	2–1	0–0	1–0	3–0	2–0	0–0		1–0	2–0	4–1	1–1	2–0
Salgueiros	2–0	1–0	1–0	2–0	5–1	4–1	1–1	2–2	3–2	2–1	1–1	2–1	0–3		0–1	1–0	1–0	1–2
Sporting CP	1–0	3–1	3–6	3–1	2–0	3–1	3–0	3–0	3–1	6–0	1–1	3–1	0–1	2–1		1–0	3–0	2–1
União da Madeira	2–0	2–0	0–2	2–1	3–1	3–0	2–2	0–0	0–0	1–2	1–1	2–0	0–2	3–1	0–0		2–0	2–1
Vitória de Guimarães	1–2	3–0	1–2	1–0	0–0	2–0	0–0	3–0	2–2	2–1	0–1	1–0	0–0	1–0	1–4	2–0		1–0
Vitória de Setúbal	2–0	3–0	5–2	1–3	1–0	2–1	1–1	6–1	2–0	0–2	4–1	3–0	3–3	4–0	2–3	2–3	1–0	

Source: Foradejogo (in Portuguese)
Legend: Blue = home team win; Yellow = draw; Red = away team win.

== Top goalscorers ==
Rank	Player	Club	Goals
1	(Nigeria) Yekini	Vitória Setúbal	21
2	(Serbia) Drulovic	Gil Vicente / Porto	18
3	(Bulgaria) Kostadinov	Porto	16
3	(Morocco) Hassan	Farense	16
5	(Bulgaria) Balakov	Sporting	15
5	(Mozambique) Chiquinho Conde	Vitória Setúbal	15
5	(Portugal) João Pinto	Benfica	15
9	(Brazil) Isaías	Benfica	12
10	(Tunisia) Ziad	Vitória de Guimarães	11
10	(Portugal) Ricardo Lopes	Estrela Amadora	11
10	(Brazil) Jorge Andrade	Marítimo	11
10	(Portugal) Ricardo Sá Pinto	Salgueiros	11

Source: Foradejogo

== Attendances ==
#	Club	Average
1	Benfica	31,294
2	Sporting	30,294
3	Porto	21,471
4	Marítimo	10,941
5	Vitória FC	10,176
6	Vitória SC	8,735
7	Boavista	8,088
8	Braga	8,088
9	Farense	7,441
10	Beira-Mar	6,265
11	Gil Vicente	6,147
12	Paços de Ferreira	5,382
13	Famalicão	5,265
14	Estrela da Amadora	5,147
15	Salgueiros	4,471
16	Os Belenenses	4,353
17	Estoril Praia	4,059
18	CF União	3,235
