= Alexandrina Cruz =

Portuguese business executive

Maria Alexandrina da Silva Costa Cruz (born 1977 or 1978) is a Portuguese business executive. In 2023, she was elected president of Rio Ave F.C. and became the first woman president of a Primeira Liga football club.

== Career ==
Cruz entered Rio Ave as its treasurer in 2004 and worked in its SDUQ, the body that ran its professional football club, becoming its vice president for finance. In 2023, António Silva Campos resigned after 13 years due to health issues, and Cruz was expected to become the club president. She ran unopposed, receiving 1,006 of 1,077 votes, and won a three-year term. She arrived with the club serving a prohibition from FIFA from signing new players, due to a complaint by Raja Casablanca over the 2021 signing of Fabrice Olinga.

In December 2024, the Portuguese version of Forbes named Cruz as one of the 40 most influential women in the country's sporting world. After investment from Greek magnate Evangelos Marinakis, Rio Ave set up a Sociedade Anónima Desportiva (SAD), an autonomous company running the professional football team. In October 2025, Cruz was appointed as president of the SAD, the first woman to hold such a position in Portugal.

In October 2026, Cruz announced she would run for a second term as club president. She said that the club would start building a new stand for the Estádio do Rio Ave FC in 2027 and finish it the following year.

Cruz also holds elected office in the assembly of the freguesia of Junqueira and the municipality of Vila do Conde, for the Socialist Party.
