= Sérgio Pinto (footballer, born 1973) =

Portuguese footballer

Personal information
- Full name: Sérgio Paulo Vieira Pinto
- Date of birth: 8 January 1973 (age 53)
- Place of birth: Porto, Portugal
- Position: Midfielder

Youth career
- Boavista
- 1986–1989: Bairro do Falcão
- 1989–1991: Boavista
- 1991–1992: Arsenal Bessa

Senior career*
Years	Team	Apps	(Gls)
1992–1993	Ermesinde	32	(2)
1993–1994	Marco	31	(4)
1994–1995	Gondomar		
1995–1996	Fátima		
1996–1997	Bradford City	18	(0)
1997–1998	Lamego		
1998–1999	Portosantense		
1999–2000	Leça	20	(8)
2000–2003	Maia	82	(2)
2003–2004	Felgueiras	41	(0)
2005	Lixa	18	(1)
- * Club domestic league appearances and goals

Sérgio Paulo Vieira Pinto (born 8 January 1973) is a Portuguese former professional footballer who played as a right midfielder.

== Club career ==
After unsuccessfully emerging through local Boavista's youth system, Porto-born Pinto played almost exclusively in the lower leagues of his country, representing Ermesinde, Marco, Gondomar, Fátima, Lamego, Portosantense, Leça, Maia, Felgueiras and Lixa. From 1999 to December 2004, he made 143 Segunda Liga appearances and scored ten goals.

In a 13-year senior career, Pinto also played one season with Football League First Division club Bradford City, featuring in less than half of the matches as the West Yorkshire side finished just one place above the relegation zone. He retired in June 2005, aged 32.

== Personal life ==
Pinto's older brother, João, was also a footballer. A forward, he played with team and individual success for Benfica and Sporting CP, also winning more than 80 caps for the Portugal national team. His nephew, Tiago, notably represented Rio Ave.
