= Basílio Almeida =

Portuguese footballer

Personal information
- Full name: Basílio Alexandre Neiva de Almeida
- Date of birth: 12 August 1971 (age 55)
- Place of birth: Vila Nova de Gaia, Portugal
- Height: 1.75 m (5 ft 9 in)
- Position: Winger

Team information
- Current team: São Roque

Youth career
- 1984−1988: Valadares
- 1988−1990: Benfica

Senior career*
Years	Team	Apps	(Gls)
1990−1991	Valadares		
1991−1994	Lusitânia	86	(24)
1994−1996	Salgueiros	30	(8)
1994−1995	→ Feirense (loan)	23	(8)
1996−1999	Vitória Guimarães	34	(4)
1999−2003	Salgueiros	117	(18)
2003−2004	Maia	32	(15)
2004−2005	Naval	30	(9)
2005−2008	Santa Clara	75	(19)
2008−2010	Covilhã	51	(4)
2010−2011	Cesarense	21	(7)
2011−2012	Santa Clara B		
2012−2013	Capelense		
2013−	São Roque		
Total		499	(116)
- * Club domestic league appearances and goals

Basílio Alexandre Neiva de Almeida (born 12 August 1971) is a Portuguese footballer who plays for Grupo Desportivo São Roque as a left winger.

He amassed Primeira Liga totals of 152 games and 22 goals over eight seasons, in representation of Salgueiros and Vitória de Guimarães. He added 240 matches and 63 goals in the Segunda Liga, in a senior career that spanned nearly three decades.

== Club career ==
Born in Vila Nova de Gaia, Porto District, Almeida started his professional career with Lusitânia F.C. in the third division, where he excelled enough to move straight into the Primeira Liga after signing with S.C. Salgueiros, appearing in only three games in his first season and finishing it on loan to second level club C.D. Feirense.

In the 1995–96 campaign, Basílio scored eight goals in 27 matches, helping Salgueiros easily avoid relegation by ranking in 12th position. In summer 1996 he joined Vitória S.C. but, after three years in which he failed to impress, he returned to his previous team, going on to compete three of four seasons in the Portuguese top flight.

After leaving the Paranhos side in 2003, at the age of 32, Basílio went on to represent a host of clubs, retiring well into his 40s in the regional championships.
