= Rui Caetano =

Portuguese footballer (born 1991)

Personal information
- Full name: Rui Miguel Teixeira Caetano
- Date of birth: 20 April 1991 (age 35)
- Place of birth: Paredes, Portugal
- Height: 1.65 m (5 ft 5 in)
- Position: Winger

Youth career
- 1999–2004: Paredes
- 2004–2010: Porto

Senior career*
Years	Team	Apps	(Gls)
2010–2014	Paços Ferreira	69	(4)
2014–2015	Gil Vicente	32	(2)
2015–2016	Penafiel	36	(1)
2016–2017	Aves	24	(1)
2017–2019	Penafiel	34	(5)
2020–2021	Varzim	12	(1)
Total		207	(14)

International career
2006–2007	Portugal U16	7	(0)
2007–2008	Portugal U17	8	(1)
2008–2009	Portugal U18	7	(0)
2009–2010	Portugal U19	6	(1)
2011	Portugal U20	14	(0)
2011	Portugal U21	1	(0)
Medal record
Men's football
Representing Portugal
FIFA U-20 World Cup
Runner-up	2011 Colombia
- * Club domestic league appearances and goals

Rui Miguel Teixeira Caetano CvIH (born 20 April 1991) is a Portuguese former professional footballer who played as a left winger.

He began his career with Paços de Ferreira, playing 101 Primeira Liga games for that club and Gil Vicente. He also surpassed a century of appearances in LigaPro (106), representing mostly Penafiel.

== Club career ==
=== Paços de Ferreira ===
Born in Paredes, Porto metropolitan area, Caetano joined FC Porto's youth system at the age of 13, being released in 2010 and joining F.C. Paços de Ferreira shortly after. He made his Primeira Liga debut on 14 August of that year, starting and assisting Mario Rondón for the game's only goal in a home win against Sporting CP.

On 23 April 2011, Caetano played in a 2–1 loss to S.L. Benfica in the final of the Taça da Liga, as a 71st-minute substitute for Manuel José. He scored his first career goal six days later, the late winner in a win by the same score at home to Vitória S.C. after replacing the same teammate.

Caetano played 25 matches in 2012–13 (21 from the bench, 616 minutes of action), as Paços finished a best-ever third and qualified for the UEFA Champions League for the first time in their history. He scored his only goal of the season on 28 April 2013, netting the final 2–2 at Vitória Guimarães in the 88th minute.

=== Gil Vicente ===
On 2 January 2014, Caetano signed for fellow top-division club Gil Vicente FC, penning a contract until June of the following year. He appeared in 20 games in his first full campaign, which ended in relegation as second from bottom.

=== Penafiel and Aves ===
On 17 August 2015, Caetano joined F.C. Penafiel of the Segunda Liga as a free agent. He played regularly in a mid-table finish, scoring once on 23 January with a last-ditch equaliser in a 1–1 home draw with S.C. Olhanense.

Caetano moved on 23 June 2016 to C.D. Aves of the same league, on a one-year contract. He was used more often as a substitute as the team won promotion as runners-up; on 7 May, on a rare start, he scored the decisive goal of a 2–1 home victory over his previous employers.

On 15 July 2017, Caetano returned to Penafiel, being presented as a surprise at a members' meeting. His first season back ended prematurely on 5 May in the penultimate round against fellow promotion-chasers Académico de Viseu F.C. as he was shown a straight red card after the match had already finished.

Caetano scored a career-best four goals the following campaign, despite rarely starting. One was the added-time winner in a 5–4 away defeat of Vitória S.C. B on 8 April 2019.

=== Varzim ===
After six months of inactivity, Caetano signed an 18-month deal with second-tier Varzim S.C. on 4 December 2019, reuniting with former Penafiel manager Paulo Alves. He alleged that he had signed for Paços de Ferreira at the start of the season, which was denied by the club.

Aged only 29, Caetano made his final appearance on 10 January 2021, scoring the winner in a 2–1 comeback victory at Penafiel.

== International career ==
In 2010, although he appeared for the Portugal under-19 team during the qualifying phase, where he scored against Macedonia, Caetano was not called to the UEFA European Under-19 Championship. On 22 May 2011 he was selected by the under-20s for the 2011 Toulon Tournament, playing three games in an eventual group-stage exit.

Caetano participated at the 2011 FIFA U-20 World Cup in Colombia, only missing two matches in seven as the nation finished in second place. He made his debut for the under-21 side on 5 September 2011, in a friendly with France; all youth categories comprised, he won 43 caps and netted twice.

== Personal life ==
Caetano's father, Agostinho, was also a professional footballer. During his career, the former helped the latter – who had also left the professional game early – in his real estate business, a reason why he never played for a team outside of the north. He owned seven recreational facilities in his own name by the time of his retirement.

== Career statistics ==
As of match played 14 May 2016

Appearances and goals by club, season and competition
Club	Season	League			Cup		League Cup		Europe		Total	
Club	Season	Division	Apps	Goals	Apps	Goals	Apps	Goals	Apps	Goals	Apps	Goals
Paços Ferreira	2010–11	Primeira Liga	15	1	0	0	1	0	—		16	1
Paços Ferreira	2011–12	Primeira Liga	18	1	2	0	3	0	—		23	1
Paços Ferreira	2012–13	Primeira Liga	25	1	5	1	5	1	—		35	3
Paços Ferreira	2013–14	Primeira Liga	11	1	1	0	1	0	2	0	15	1
Paços Ferreira	Total		69	4	8	1	10	1	2	0	89	6
Gil Vicente	2013–14	Primeira Liga	12	1	0	0	3	0	—		15	1
Gil Vicente	2014–15	Primeira Liga	20	1	4	0	3	1	—		27	2
Gil Vicente	Total		32	2	4	0	6	1	—		42	3
Penafiel	2015–16	Segunda Liga	36	1	3	0	1	0	—		40	1
Career total			137	7	15	1	17	3	2	0	171	10

== Honours ==
Paços de Ferreira

- Taça da Liga runner-up: 2010–11

Portugal U20

- FIFA U-20 World Cup runner-up: 2011

Orders

- Knight of the Order of Prince Henry
