= Augusto Gama =

Portuguese football manager and former player

Personal information
- Full name: Augusto Vilela Gama
- Date of birth: 26 January 1970 (age 56)
- Place of birth: Lanhas, Portugal
- Height: 1.75 m (5 ft 9 in)
- Position: Forward

Team information
- Current team: Rio Ave (assistant)

Youth career
- 1985–1988: Braga

Senior career*
Years	Team	Apps	(Gls)
1987–1992	Braga	22	(1)
1989–1990	→ Fafe (loan)	30	(8)
1990–1992	Braga B	19	(1)
1992–2007	Rio Ave	413	(54)
Total		484	(64)

International career
1987	Portugal U18	3	(0)
1990–1991	Portugal U21	7	(0)

Managerial career
- 2010–: Rio Ave (assistant)
- 2018–2019: Rio Ave (interim)
- * Club domestic league appearances and goals

Augusto Vilela Gama (born 26 January 1970) is a Portuguese former professional footballer who played as a forward. He is currently assistant manager of Primeira Liga club Rio Ave.

He amassed Primeira Liga totals of 206 matches and 14 goals over 11 seasons, in representation of Braga and Rio Ave. He added 229 appearances and goals 41 in the Segunda Liga, in a career mainly associated with the latter club.

== Club career ==
Born in the village of Lanhas, Vila Verde, Braga District, Gama started his career at S.C. Braga, but only totalled four Primeira Liga appearances in his first two seasons, his debut in the competition coming on 24 October 1987 by playing eight minutes in a 2–2 home draw against Vitória de Setúbal. After a loan to AD Fafe in the Segunda Liga, his fate did not improve and he left in June 1992.

Gama subsequently signed for Rio Ave F.C. also in the second division, going on to remain with the club until his retirement 15 years later and compete in a further seven top-flight campaigns. In 1997–98 he scored four goals in 34 games, helping the Vila do Conde-based team to the ninth position.

Gama continued to work with Rio Ave after retiring at the age of 37, acting as assistant coach to several coaches. On 22 December 2018, after José Gomes left to sign with Reading of the English Championship, he was named interim manager.

== International career ==
Gama received a call-up to the Portugal under-18 side in 1987, being included in José Augusto's squad for five matches and making his debut in a 2–1 loss against the Netherlands on 17 April, as a substitute. In 1990 he was picked for the under-21s, earning the first of his seven caps on 21 May against England, a 1–0 win.

== Personal life ==
Gama's younger brother, Bruno, was also a footballer. He too represented Braga and Rio Ave.

== Honours ==
Rio Ave

- Segunda Liga: 1995–96, 2002–03
