= João Pinto =

Portuguese footballer (born 1971)

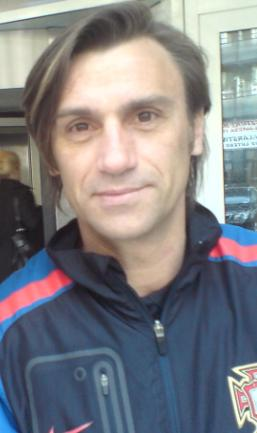
- Pinto in 2013

Personal information
- Full name: João Manuel Vieira Pinto
- Date of birth: 19 August 1971 (age 55)
- Place of birth: Porto, Portugal
- Height: 1.71 m (5 ft 7 in)
- Position: Forward

Youth career
- Bairro do Falcão
- 1982–1983: Águias da Areosa
- 1983–1988: Boavista

Senior career*
Years	Team	Apps	(Gls)
1988–1989	Boavista	17	(3)
1990–1991	Atlético Madrileño	30	(9)
1991–1992	Boavista	34	(8)
1992–2000	Benfica	220	(64)
2000–2004	Sporting CP	115	(28)
2004–2006	Boavista	57	(11)
2006–2008	Braga	33	(3)
Total		506	(126)

International career
1987–1988	Portugal U16	15	(5)
1988–1989	Portugal U18	22	(11)
1989–1991	Portugal U20	18	(3)
1991–1994	Portugal U21	15	(3)
1991–2002	Portugal	81	(23)
Medal record
Men's football
Representing Portugal
UEFA European Championship
Bronze medal – third place	2000 Belgium-Netherlands
FIFA U-20 World Cup
Winner	1991 Portugal
Winner	1989 Saudi Arabia
UEFA European Under-21 Championship
Runner-up	1994 France
UEFA European Under-17 Championship
Runner-up	1988 Spain
- * Club domestic league appearances and goals

João Manuel Vieira Pinto CvIH (Portuguese pronunciation: [ʒuˈɐ̃w ˈpĩtu, ˈʒwɐ̃w -]; born 19 August 1971) is a Portuguese former professional footballer who played mostly as a forward.

Blessed with playmaking and goalscoring ability, he made his name mostly at a domestic level and as a key figure in the Portuguese national team's "Golden Generation", collecting 151 caps and scoring 45 goals across all levels (81/23 for the senior team alone) and representing the country at the 2002 World Cup and two European Championships.

At the club level, Pinto started his career with Boavista, but it was mainly associated with two of the biggest clubs in the country, Benfica and Sporting CP, with which he won one Primeira Liga each for a total of six major titles. Over 19 top-division seasons, he played 476 matches and netted 117 goals.

== Career ==
As a youth, Pinto played for Bairro do Falcão (where he was born, in Campanhã, Porto's east side) and Águias da Areosa, finishing his development at Boavista after joining its academy as a 12-year-old. Early on, he impressed with his speed and ball control, and was subsequently one of the brightest stars in Portugal's wins in the FIFA U-20 World Cup in Riyadh and Lisbon, being one of three players ever to have been on the winning side in this competition twice along with goalkeeper Fernando Brassard (whom however did not play in the first tournament) and Argentinian Sergio Agüero. Additionally, he made his Primeira Liga debut at only 17.

Pinto's performance in the first youth competition earned him a transfer to Atlético Madrid in 1990, but he was placed instead with the reserve team. After a forgettable season he rejoined Boavista, appeared in every match, scored eight goals and won the Taça de Portugal, in a final against city rivals Porto. Shortly after, he signed for Benfica.

Whilst with Benfica, Pinto's career was threatened in late 1992 by a collapsed lung during an international match for Portugal in Scotland for the 1994 FIFA World Cup qualifiers, eventually recovering but being unable to help his team win the title. However, the next season, he played arguably his best football there, his best moment coming in the Lisbon derby against Sporting CP, where he scored three goals and was on the play of the remaining three in a 6–3 win at the Estádio José Alvalade; this result proved to be decisive for the club's clinching of the 1994 national championship.

Dubbed "The Golden Boy", Pinto won captaincy from veteran António Veloso after the latter's retirement in 1995, but was unable to win a national title again. Following a wage dispute with president João Vale e Azevedo, he was released from contract weeks before the UEFA Euro 2000 (making him the only free agent in the competition), where he helped the national team reach the semi-finals after scoring eight goals during the qualifying stage, netting through a header against England in a 3–2 comeback win in the group stage on 13 June 2000; he was also selected for the Euro 1996 tournament.

Subsequently, Pinto had several offers from abroad, eventually agreeing to a four-year deal at Sporting. After a relatively poor season in 2000–01, the Lions acquired four-time Portuguese Golden Boot winner Mário Jardel, and Pinto returned to his golden years in a magnificent run which ended with the claiming of his second title; named the "father of the team" by the Brazilian, took part in all but one game and scored nine goals.

Although a highly talented player, Pinto was also known for a series of red cards for aggression and bad tackles. His feud with Porto player and national teammate Paulinho Santos lasted for years, and both would be frequently ejected after hitting each other; he also caused some controversy when he assaulted a fireman in the league fixture at Rio Ave on 20 September 1997.

The lowest point, however, was when Pinto hit Argentine referee Ángel Sánchez who had sent him off after a bad tackle early into the 1–0 loss to hosts South Korea in the third group game of the 2002 World Cup. He was suspended for six months.

Pinto ended his Portugal career with 81 caps and 23 goals. Never recovering fully from the World Cup incident, he failed to impress in the following seasons, when Sporting failed to reach the top two spots, and in 2004 he was released from contract, returning to Boavista. Although he was close to signing with Al Hilal of Saudi Arabia in the January transfer window, he remained with his first professional club.

After a second season carrying Boavista's squad (who almost qualified for the UEFA Cup, with him scoring nine league goals and receiving numerous Player of the match awards), Pinto accepted the invitation of Braga's board in July 2006, signing for one year. He netted twice in 24 appearances in an eventual fourth-place finish for the Minho side, and renewed his link for the 2007–08 campaign; however, during February 2008, he trained with Toronto FC of Major League Soccer and, later that month, announced the termination of his contract at Braga, retiring shortly after aged 36.

Subsequently, Pinto worked with the Portuguese Football Federation in directorial capacities.

== Personal life ==
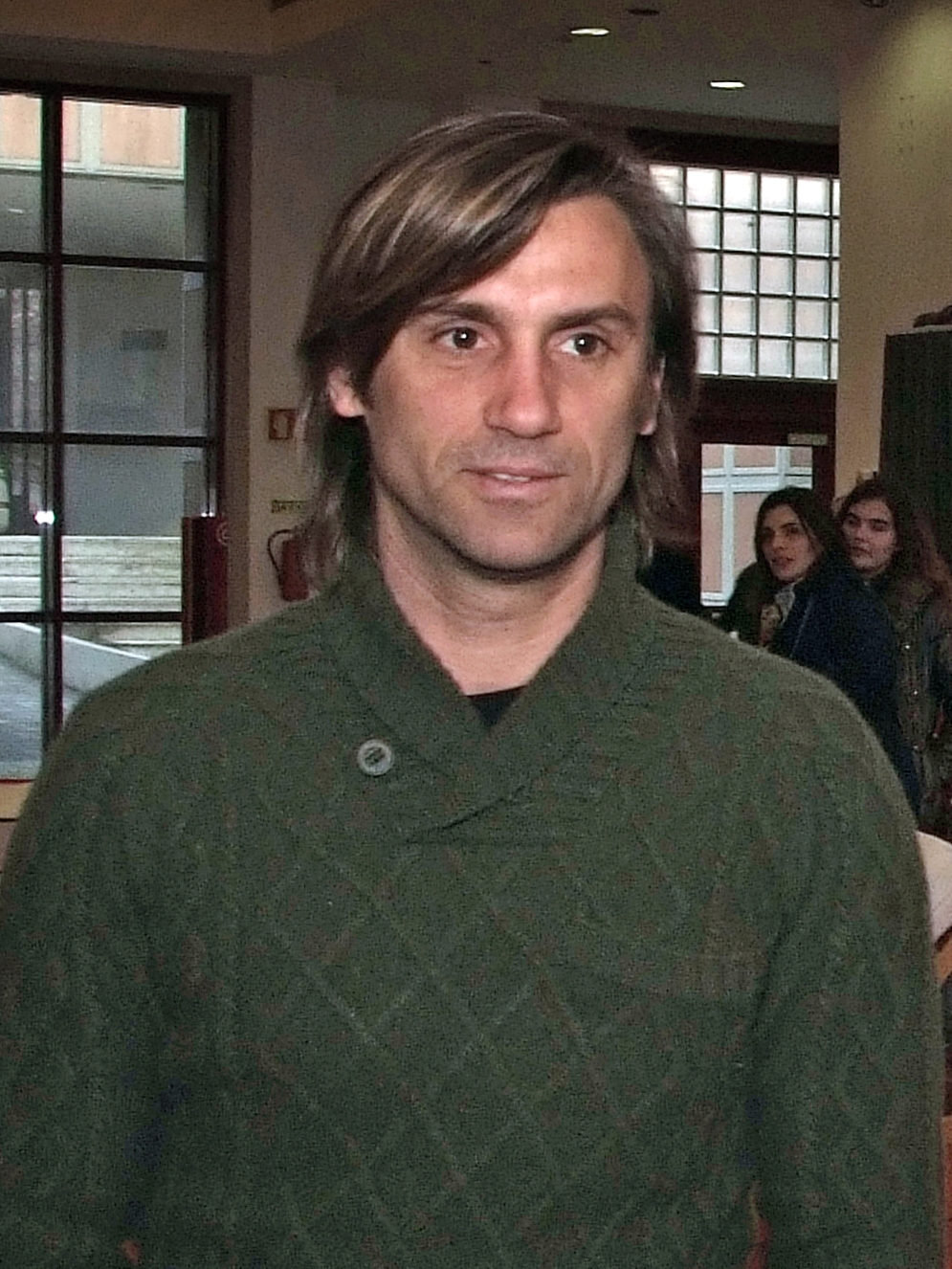
Pinto in 2011

Still in his teens, Pinto had two children from his first marriage to Carla Baía; the elder, Tiago, first played professionally with Olivais e Moscavide. In 2008 he married television presenter Marisa Cruz, with the couple divorcing five years later.

Pinto's younger brother, Sérgio, was also a footballer, having competed almost exclusively in the lower leagues of Portugal and one year in England.

== Career statistics ==
=== Club ===
Appearances and goals by club, season and competition
Club	Season	League		Cup		Europe		Total	
Club	Season	Apps	Goals	Apps	Goals	Apps	Goals	Apps	Goals
Boavista	1988–89	6	0	0	0	0	0	6	0
Boavista	1989–90	11	3	0	0	2	2	13	5
Boavista	Total	17	3	0	0	2	2	19	5
Atlético Madrid B	1990–91	0	0	0	0	0	0	0	0
Boavista	1991–92	34	8	5	0	4	0	43	8
Benfica	1992–93	21	7	6	1	4	1	31	9
Benfica	1993–94	34	15	2	1	8	2	44	18
Benfica	1994–95	24	4	5	1	7	1	36	6
Benfica	1995–96	31	18	6	4	5	1	42	23
Benfica	1996–97	28	7	6	6	6	3	40	16
Benfica	1997–98	25	6	3	1	2	0	30	7
Benfica	1998–99	28	4	1	0	7	3	36	7
Benfica	1999–2000	29	3	1	0	5	0	35	3
Benfica	Total	220	64	30	14	44	11	294	89
Sporting CP	2000–01	31	6	5	1	5	0	41	7
Sporting CP	2001–02	33	9	6	2	5	1	44	12
Sporting CP	2002–03	25	8	1	0	0	0	26	8
Sporting CP	2003–04	26	5	1	0	4	0	31	5
Sporting CP	Total	115	28	13	3	14	1	142	32
Boavista	2004–05	26	2	4	1	0	0	30	3
Boavista	2005–06	31	9	1	1	0	0	32	10
Boavista	Total	57	11	5	2	0	0	62	13
Braga	2006–07	24	2	0	0	0	0	24	2
Braga	2007–08	9	1	0	0	0	0	9	1
Braga	Total	33	3	0	0	0	0	33	3
Career total		476	117	56	20	75	15	605	152

=== International ===
Scores and results list Portugal's goal tally first, score column indicates score after each Pinto goal.

List of international goals scored by João Pinto
No.	Date	Venue	Opponent	Score	Result	Competition
1	20 November 1991	Estádio da Luz (1954), Lisbon, Portugal	Greece	1–0	1–0	Euro 1992 qualifying
2	19 June 1993	Estádio do Bessa, Porto, Portugal	Malta	3–0	4–0	1994 World Cup qualification
3	13 October 1993	Estádio das Antas, Porto, Portugal	Switzerland	1–0	1–0	1994 World Cup qualification
4	9 October 1994	Daugava Stadium (Riga), Riga, Latvia	Latvia	1–1	3–1	Euro 1996 qualifying
5	9 October 1994	Daugava Stadium (Riga), Riga, Latvia	Latvia	2–0	3–1	Euro 1996 qualifying
6	18 December 1994	Estádio da Luz (1954), Lisbon, Portugal	Liechtenstein	4–0	8–0	Euro 1996 qualifying
7	19 June 1996	City Ground, Nottingham, England	Croatia	2–0	3–0	UEFA Euro 1996
8	5 October 1996	Olimpiysky National Sports Complex, Kyiv, Ukraine	Ukraine	1–1	1–2	1998 World Cup qualification
9	7 June 1997	Estádio das Antas, Porto, Portugal	Albania	1–0	2–0	1998 World Cup qualification
10	14 October 1998	Štadión Pasienky, Bratislava, Slovakia	Slovakia	1–0	3–0	Euro 2000 qualifying
11	14 October 1998	Štadión Pasienky, Bratislava, Slovakia	Slovakia	2–0	3–0	Euro 2000 qualifying
12	26 March 1999	Estádio D. Afonso Henriques, Guimarães, Portugal	Azerbaijan	2–0	7–0	Euro 2000 qualifying
13	26 March 1999	Estádio D. Afonso Henriques, Guimarães, Portugal	Azerbaijan	5–0	7–0	Euro 2000 qualifying
14	9 June 1999	Estádio Municipal de Coimbra, Coimbra, Portugal	Liechtenstein	2–0	8–0	Euro 2000 qualifying
15	9 June 1999	Estádio Municipal de Coimbra, Coimbra, Portugal	Liechtenstein	5–0	8–0	Euro 2000 qualifying
16	9 June 1999	Estádio Municipal de Coimbra, Coimbra, Portugal	Liechtenstein	6–0	8–0	Euro 2000 qualifying
17	18 August 1999	Estádio Nacional, Lisbon, Portugal	Andorra	2–0	4–0	Friendly
18	9 October 1999	Estádio da Luz (1954), Lisbon, Portugal	Hungary	2–0	3–0	Euro 2000 qualifying
19	12 June 2000	Philips Stadion, Eindhoven, Netherlands	England	2–2	3–2	UEFA Euro 2000
20	16 August 2000	Estádio do Fontelo, Viseu, Portugal	Lithuania	1–0	5–1	Friendly
21	6 June 2001	Estádio José Alvalade (1956), Lisbon, Portugal	Cyprus	5–0	6–0	2002 World Cup qualification
22	6 June 2001	Estádio José Alvalade (1956), Lisbon, Portugal	Cyprus	6–0	6–0	2002 World Cup qualification
23	6 October 2001	Estádio da Luz (1954), Lisbon, Portugal	Estonia	1–0	5–0	2002 World Cup qualification

== Honours ==
Boavista

- Taça de Portugal: 1991–92

Benfica

- Primeira Liga: 1993–94
- Taça de Portugal: 1992–93, 1995–96

Sporting CP

- Primeira Liga: 2001–02
- Taça de Portugal: 2001–02
- Supertaça Cândido de Oliveira: 2000

Portugal

- FIFA U-20 World Cup: 1989, 1991
- UEFA European Under-21 Championship runner-up: 1994
- UEFA European Under-18 Championship runner-up: 1988, 1990
- UEFA European Under-16 Championship runner-up: 1988

Individual

- CNID Footballer of the Year: 1992, 1993, 1994
- Portuguese Golden Ball: 1993, 1996
- SJPF Player of the Month: February 2006

== See also ==
- List of association football families
