= Félix Mourinho =

Portuguese footballer and manager

Personal information
- Full name: José Manuel Mourinho Félix
- Date of birth: 12 February 1938
- Place of birth: Ferragudo, Portugal
- Date of death: 25 June 2017 (aged 79)
- Place of death: Setúbal, Portugal
- Height: 1.74 m (5 ft 8 1/2 in)
- Position: Goalkeeper

Youth career
- Vitória Setúbal

Senior career*
Years	Team	Apps	(Gls)
1955–1968	Vitória Setúbal	143	(0)
1968–1974	Belenenses	131	(0)
Total		274	(0)

International career
1972	Portugal	1	(0)

Managerial career
- 1971: Belenenses (assistant)
- 1976–1977: Estrela Portalegre
- 1977–1978: Caldas
- 1978–1979: União Leiria
- 1979–1981: Amora
- 1981–1982: Rio Ave
- 1982–1983: Belenenses
- 1983–1984: Rio Ave
- 1985: Varzim
- 1985–1986: União Madeira
- 1988–1989: O Elvas
- 1989–1990: Covilhã
- 1992: União Santarém
- 1995: Vitória Setúbal
- 1996: Vitória Setúbal
- * Club domestic league appearances and goals

José Manuel Mourinho Félix (12 February 1938 – 25 June 2017), known as Félix Mourinho, was a Portuguese football goalkeeper and manager.

== Playing career ==
Mourinho was born in Ferragudo, Faro District, Algarve. He played 19 seasons as a professional, making his Primeira Liga debut in 1955–56 with Vitória de Setúbal. He spent 13 campaigns with the Sado River side, helping them to win two Portuguese Cups and appearing in as many Inter-Cities Fairs Cup editions.

Before 1968–69 started, Mourinho signed for fellow top-division club Belenenses, finishing in a personal best-ever second position in his fifth season – with the subsequent qualification for the UEFA Cup – and retiring in June of the following year at the age of 36. He earned one cap for the Portugal national team, coming on as a substitute for Benfica's José Henrique in the dying minutes of a 2–1 win against the Republic of Ireland in the 1972 Brazil Independence Cup.

== Coaching career ==
Mourinho started coaching on a full basis in 1976 (he had worked as an assistant with Belenenses, while still an active player). His first spell in the top tier was in 1980–81 with Amora, which he had led to promotion as champions the previous year. He left the team midway through the campaign and rejoined the Segunda Liga with Rio Ave, achieving the same feat after winning seven matches in 11.

Mourinho's only full seasons in the top flight were 1981–82 and 1983–84, leading Rio Ave to the fifth place in the former and the final of the domestic cup in the latter. The former saw his son José involved with the squad for the first time, and he was also usually tasked with scouting other teams for his father when not playing for the reserves. Mourinho rarely selected his son, but on the final day of the campaign against champions-elect Sporting CP, a defender was injured in the pre-match warm up, so he told his son to get changed. However, president José Maria Pinho, fearing the threat of nepotism, overruled the decision to do so; the incident saw the pair leave the club to join Belenenses the following summer – before that, the manager was considered for the Portugal job, but he was passed over for Fernando Cabrita.

Mourinho returned to Rio Ave in 1983, but was sacked on Christmas Day 1984 after the team went on a bad run and lost to Covilhã. In the mid-to-late 1990s, he twice came to the rescue of Vitória Setúbal, with top-division relegation befalling in 1995 as they only won twice in his 12 games in charge.

== Personal life ==
Mourinho married Maria Júlia Carrajola dos Santos (born 1939), a teacher, and had two children, Teresa (1960–1997) and José. The latter went on to become one of the most renowned and successful football managers of his era.

== Death ==
Mourinho died on 25 June 2017 in Setúbal, at the age of 79.

== Honours ==
=== Player ===
Vitória Setúbal

- Taça de Portugal: 1964–65, 1966–67; runner-up: 1961–62, 1965–66, 1967–68

=== Manager ===
Amora

- Segunda Divisão: 1979–80

Rio Ave

- Taça de Portugal runner-up: 1983–84
