= Fernando Brassard =

Portuguese football coach and former player

Personal information
- Full name: Fernando José Alves Brassard
- Date of birth: 11 April 1972 (age 54)
- Place of birth: Lourenço Marques, Mozambique
- Height: 1.74 m (5 ft 9 in)
- Position: Goalkeeper

Youth career
- 1983–1990: Benfica

Senior career*
Years	Team	Apps	(Gls)
1990–1997	Benfica	2	(0)
1990–1991	→ Louletano (loan)	0	(0)
1991–1992	→ Marítimo (loan)	6	(0)
1992–1993	→ Gil Vicente (loan)	33	(0)
1993–1994	→ Vitória Guimarães (loan)	19	(0)
1994–1995	→ Gil Vicente (loan)	18	(0)
1997–1998	Varzim	34	(0)
1998–2001	Vitória Setúbal	26	(0)
Total		138	(0)

International career
1991	Portugal U20	9	(0)
1991–1994	Portugal U21	27	(0)
Medal record
Men's football
Representing Portugal
FIFA U-20 World Cup
Winner	1991 Portugal
Winner	1989 Saudi Arabia
UEFA European Under-21 Championship
Runner-up	1994 France
UEFA European Under-17 Championship
Runner-up	1988 Spain
- * Club domestic league appearances and goals

Fernando José Alves Brassard ComIH (born 11 April 1972) is a Portuguese former professional footballer who played as a goalkeeper.

== Playing career ==
Born in Lourenço Marques, Portuguese Mozambique, Brassard emerged through Benfica's youth system, but was soon deemed surplus to requirements, making his professional debut with lowly Louletano on loan. In the following years, he represented on the same basis Marítimo, Gil Vicente (two spells) and Vitória de Guimarães.

In the summer of 1995, Brassard returned to Benfica for two unassuming seasons, as he had to settle with battling for backup status behind Belgian Michel Preud'homme. He then spent one year with Varzim – starting but seeing his club be relegated from the Primeira Liga – closing out his career at Vitória de Setúbal aged only 29, being again second-choice for three years.

Brassard was in the squad for both of Portugal winning teams in the FIFA U-20 World Cup in 1989 and 1991, being part of the dubbed the Golden Generation. Alongside teammate João Pinto and Argentinian Sergio Agüero, he was the only player in the world to win the tournament twice, although he did not play one second in the first edition.

== Coaching career ==
In 2003, shortly after his retirement, Brassard joined the senior national team's coaching staff, working with the goalkeepers for several years. In 2010, in the same capacity, he switched to the under-21 side.

== Honours ==
Benfica

- Taça de Portugal: 1995–96

Portugal

- FIFA U-20 World Cup: 1989, 1991
- UEFA European Under-21 Championship runner-up: 1994
