= Hugo Santos (footballer, born 1972) =

Portuguese footballer

Hugo
Personal information
- Full name: Hugo Manuel Gomes dos Santos e Santos
- Date of birth: 23 December 1972 (age 53)
- Place of birth: Mértola, Portugal
- Height: 1.74 m (5 ft 9 in)
- Position: Midfielder

Senior career*
| Years | Team | Apps | (Gls) |
| 1991–1995 | Farense | 84 | (10) |
| 1995–1999 | União de Leiria | 105 | (9) |
| 1999–2002 | Beira-Mar | 62 | (10) |
| 2002–2003 | Salgueiros | 15 | (1) |
| 2003–2004 | Louletano | | |
| 2004–2005 | Beira-Mar Monte Gordo | | |
| 2005–2006 | Lusitano VRSA | | |
| 2006–2008 | Sambrasense | | |
- * Club domestic league appearances and goals

Hugo Manuel Gomes dos Santos e Santos (born 23 December 1972), known as Hugo, is a Portuguese former footballer who played as a midfielder. He played 10 seasons and 195 games in the Primeira Liga for União de Leiria, Farense and Beira-Mar.

== Career ==
Hugo made his Primeira Liga debut on 22 March 1992 for Farense as a late substitute in a 3–0 victory over Vitória de Guimarães.
