= F.C. Tirsense =

Portuguese football club

FC Tirsense
- Full name: Futebol Clube Tirsense
- Founded: 1938
- Ground: Estádio Abel Alves de Figueiredo, Santo Tirso
- Capacity: 8,000
- Chairman: Fernando Matos
- Manager: Tonau
- League: Campeonato de Portugal Serie A
| Home colours | Away colours |

Futebol Clube Tirsense, commonly known as just Tirsense, is a Portuguese football club from Santo Tirso, founded on 5 January 1938. They currently play in the Divisão de Elite of AF Porto. They currently play their home games in Abel Alves de Figueiredo with a capacity of 8,000 spectators. Their current chairman is Fernando Matos and their manager is Tonau.

== History ==
The club's finest hour came without doubt in 1948–49 when, under the management of Artur Pinga, they knocked the all-conquering Sporting Clube de Portugal side of the "Five Violins" out of the Portuguese Cup with a 2–1 victory. In 1994–95, they finished eighth (one win away from a UEFA Cup position) in the First Division, their highest-ever position. The following year, however, they were relegated, in the first of four consecutive demotions, dropping from the main championship in 1996 to the regional championships in 1999. The following year, the club was promoted to the Third Division.

In spite of this, Tirsense has a usual attendance of 1,500 to 2,000, among the best in Portuguese non-professional championships. Assuming an amateur status since 2004, the club is making a successful task honouring debts, and aspires to make a comeback to the top in a near future. Marcelo (who later played in England), along with Emerson Thome (better known in Portugal as Paredão), and Everton Giovanella (Celta de Vigo), are the most internationally known former club players. Recent names like Caetano, Rui Manuel, or Batista are also well remembered by the fans. From the more distant years, António Luís and Festa (former Portuguese international) are some of the most sounding names. Tirsense was coached by Joaquim Machado, who at his first season at the club as head coach (2006–07), managed to promote Tirsense to the Second Division, where the club competed in its Serie A.

== Fans ==
The club has an organised fan group called Juve Negra and a small ultras group called the Black Lions, founded in 2012.

== League and cup history ==
| Season | I | II | III | IV | V | Pts. | Pl. | W | L | T | GS | GA | Diff. | Portuguese Cup |
|---|---|---|---|---|---|---|---|---|---|---|---|---|---|---|
| 1967–68 | 13 | | | | | 15 pts | 26 | 5 | 5 | 16 | 17 | 53 | −36 | |
| 1969–70 | | 1 | | | | 38 pts | 26 | 17 | 4 | 5 | 50 | 26 | +24 | |
| 1970–71 | 9 | | | | | 20 pts | 26 | 6 | 8 | 12 | 26 | 45 | −19 | |
| 1971–72 | 16 | | | | | 19 pts | 30 | 6 | 7 | 17 | 28 | 66 | −38 | |
| 1989–90 | 9 | | | | | 30 pts | 34 | 7 | 16 | 11 | 21 | 32 | −11 | |
| 1990–91 | 16 | | | | | 33 pts | 38 | 10 | 13 | 15 | 39 | 50 | −11 | |
| 1991–92 | | 3 | | | | 45 pts | 34 | 16 | 13 | 5 | 31 | 14 | +17 | |
| 1992–93 | 16 | | | | | 28 pts | 34 | 10 | 8 | 16 | 27 | 37 | −10 | |
| 1993–94 | | 1 | | | | 46 pts | 34 | 17 | 12 | 5 | 42 | 23 | +19 | |
| 1994–95 | 8 | | | | | 34 pts | 34 | 14 | 6 | 14 | 35 | 34 | +1 | |
| 1995–96 | 18 | | | | | 31 pts | 34 | 7 | 10 | 17 | 30 | 54 | −24 | |
| 1996–97 | | 18 | | | | 30 pts | 34 | 8 | 6 | 20 | 25 | 51 | −26 | |
| 1997–98 | | | 18 | | | 17 pts | 34 | 4 | 5 | 25 | 26 | 73 | −47 | |
| 2003–04 | | | | 9 | | 50 pts | 34 | 15 | 5 | 14 | 46 | 46 | 0 | |
| 2004–05 | | | | 10 | | 50 pts | 34 | 14 | 8 | 12 | 40 | 30 | +10 | |
| 2005–06 | | | | 6 | | 48 pts | 32 | 14 | 6 | 12 | 46 | 41 | +5 | |
| 2006–07 | | | | 2 | | 50 pts | 26 | 15 | 5 | 6 | 37 | 25 | +12 | |
| 2007–08 | | | 2 | | | 50 pts | 26 | 15 | 5 | 6 | 37 | 25 | +12 | |
| 2008–09 | | | 2 | | | 38 pts | 22 | 10 | 8 | 4 | 31 | 23 | +9 | |
| 2011–12 | | | 5 | | | 44 pts | 30 | 11 | 11 | 8 | 39 | 29 | +10 | |
| 2012-13 | | | 6 | | | 45 pts | 30 | 11 | 12 | 7 | 35 | 32 | +3 | |
| 2013-14 | | | 9 | | | 19 pts | 18 | | | | | | | |
| 2014-15 | | | 7 | | | 18 pts | 18 | | | | | | | |
| 2015-16 | | | 7 | | | 19 pts | 18 | | | | | | | |
| 2016-17 | | | | | | | | | | | | | | |
| 2017-18 | | | | | | | | | | | | | | |

=== Total game history ===
- Liga Portuguesa: 256 games, 65 wins, 73 ties, 118 losses, 219 GS 370 GA
- Taça de Portugal 127 games, 58 wins, 18 ties, 51 losses, 183 GS, 180 GA
- II Divisão B: 31 games, 15 wins, 6 ties, 10 losses, 38 GS, 32 GA
- IV and III Divisão: 96 games, 46 wins, 21 ties, 29 losses, 134 GS, 93 GA

== Former international footballers ==
The following footballers have been playing for their national football team while playing for Tirsense:

- (Zaire) Tueba Menayane (1989–1991)
- (Portugal) Agostinho Caetano (1990–1996)
- (Morocco) Rachid Daoudi (1995–1996)
- (Nigeria) Samson Siasia (1995–1996)
- (Saint Vincent and the Grenadines) Marlon James
- (Portugal) Pisca

== Honours ==
- Segunda Liga
  - Winners (1): 1993–94
- Segunda Divisão
  - Winners (1): 1969–70

== Presidents ==
- (Portugal) Alcindo dos Reis (until 2011)
- Ricardo Rossi (from 2011)

== Managers ==
- (Portugal) Dinis Rodrigues (until 2011)
- Quim Machado (from 2011)
