= 1994–95 Primeira Divisão =

61st season of top-tier Portuguese football

Primeira Divisão
- Season: 1994–95
- Champions: Porto; 14th title
- Relegated: União da Madeira; Beira-Mar; Vitória de Setúbal
- Champions League: Porto (group stage)
- Cup Winners' Cup: Sporting CP (first round)
- UEFA Cup: Benfica (first round); V. Guimarães (first round); Farense (first round)
- Matches: 306
- Goals: 731 (2.39 per match)
- Top goalscorer: Hassan (21 goals)
- Biggest home win: Salgueiros 6–0 Estrela da Amadora (25 February 1995)
- Biggest away win: Chaves 0–4 Porto (30 October 1994)
- Highest scoring: Porto 5–2 Salgueiros (8 January 1995)

The 1994–95 Primeira Divisão was the 61st edition of top flight of Portuguese football. It started on 21 August 1994 with a match between Belenenses and Estrela da Amadora, and ended on 28 May 1995. The league was contested by 18 clubs with Benfica as the defending champions.

Porto won the league and qualified for the 1995–96 UEFA Champions League group stage, Sporting qualified for the 1994–95 UEFA Cup Winners' Cup first round, and Benfica, Vitória de Guimarães and Farense qualified for the 1995–96 UEFA Cup; in opposite, União da Madeira, Beira-Mar and Vitória de Setúbal were relegated to the Liga de Honra. Hassan was the top scorer with 21 goals.

This was the final season in which two points were awarded for a win; going forward this changed to three points.

== Promotion and relegation ==
=== Teams relegated to Liga de Honra ===
- Paços de Ferreira
- Famalicão
- Estoril-Praia

Paços de Ferreira, Famalicão and Estoril-Praia, were consigned to the Liga de Honra following their final classification in 1993–94 season.

=== Teams promoted from Liga de Honra ===
- Tirsense
- União de Leiria
- Chaves

The other three teams were replaced by Tirsense, União de Leiria and Chaves from the Liga de Honra.

== Teams ==
=== Stadia and locations ===
Location of teams in Primeira Divisão 1994-95 (Mainland)
Location of teams in Primeira Divisão 1994-95 (Madeira)

Team	Head coach	City	Stadium	1993–94 finish
Beira-Mar	(Portugal) Rodolfo Reis	Aveiro	Estádio Mário Duarte	14th
Belenenses	(Portugal) José Romão	Lisbon	Estádio do Restelo	13th
Benfica	(Portugal) Artur Jorge	Lisbon	Estádio da Luz	1st
Boavista	(Portugal) Manuel José	Porto	Estádio do Bessa	4th
Braga	(Portugal) Manuel Cajuda	Braga	Estádio Primeiro de Maio	15th
Chaves	(Portugal) Vítor Urbano	Chaves	Estádio Municipal de Chaves	3rd in Divisão de Honra
Estrela da Amadora	(Portugal) Acácio Casimiro	Amadora	Estádio José Gomes	9th
Farense	(Spain) Paco Fortes	Faro	Estádio de São Luís	8th
Gil Vicente	(Portugal) Vítor Oliveira	Barcelos	Estádio Adelino Ribeiro Novo	10th
Marítimo	(Portugal) António Jesus	Funchal	Estádio dos Barreiros	5th
Porto	(England) Bobby Robson	Porto	Estádio das Antas	2nd
Salgueiros	(Portugal) Mário Reis	Porto	Estádio Engenheiro Vidal Pinheiro	11th
Sporting	(Portugal) Carlos Queiroz	Lisbon	Estádio José Alvalade	3rd
Tirsense	(Portugal) Eurico Gomes	Santo Tirso	Estádio Abel Alves de Figueiredo	1st in Divisão de Honra
União de Leiria	(Portugal) Vítor Manuel	Leiria	Estádio Dr. Magalhães Pessoa	2nd in Divisão de Honra
União da Madeira	(Brazil) Ernesto Paulo	Funchal	Estádio dos Barreiros	12th
Vitória de Guimarães	(Portugal) Quinito	Guimarães	Estádio D. Afonso Henriques	7th
Vitória de Setúbal	(Portugal) Raul Águas	Setúbal	Estádio do Bonfim	6th

=== Managerial changes ===
Team	Outgoing manager	Date of vacancy	Position in table	Incoming manager	Date of appointment
Vitória de Setúbal	(Portugal) Raul Águas	1 October 1994	18th	(Portugal) Diamantino Miranda	2 October 1994
Belenenses	(Portugal) José Romão	1 October 1994	16th	(Portugal) João Alves	2 October 1994
Vitória de Setúbal	(Portugal) Diamantino Miranda	6 November 1994	18th	(Brazil) Abel Braga	7 November 1994
Estrela da Amadora	(Portugal) Acácio Casimiro	20 November 1995	12th	(Portugal) Fernando Santos	20 November 1995
União da Madeira	(Brazil) Ernesto Paulo	27 November 1995	17th	(Brazil) Arthur Bernardes	28 November 1995
Vitória de Setúbal	(Brazil) Abel Braga	25 February 1995	18th	(Portugal) Mourinho Félix	26 February 1995
Beira-Mar	(Portugal) Rodolfo Reis	30 April 1995	17th	(Brazil) Acácio Barreto	1 May 1995

== League table ==
Pos	Team	Pld	W	D	L	GF	GA	GD	Pts	Qualification or relegation
1	Porto (C)	34	29	4	1	73	15	+58	62	Qualification to Champions League group stage
2	Sporting CP	34	23	9	2	59	21	+38	55	Qualification to Cup Winners' Cup first round (Note: Sporting qualified for the Cup Winners' Cup as Portuguese Cup winners)
3	Benfica	34	21	5	8	61	28	+33	47	Qualification to UEFA Cup first round
4	Vitória de Guimarães	34	16	10	8	54	43	+11	42	Qualification to UEFA Cup first round
5	Farense	34	16	5	13	44	38	+6	37	Qualification to UEFA Cup first round
6	União de Leiria	34	13	10	11	41	44	−3	36	
7	Marítimo	34	12	11	11	41	45	−4	35	
8	Tirsense	34	14	6	14	35	34	+1	34	
9	Boavista	34	12	8	14	40	49	−9	32	
10	Braga	34	11	10	13	34	42	−8	32	
11	Salgueiros	34	11	7	16	43	50	−7	29	
12	Belenenses	34	10	7	17	30	39	−9	27	
13	Gil Vicente	34	7	13	14	30	40	−10	27	
14	Chaves	34	10	7	17	33	49	−16	27	
15	Estrela da Amadora	34	6	14	14	27	40	−13	26	
16	União da Madeira (R)	34	7	10	17	30	54	−24	24	Relegation to Segunda Divisão de Honra
17	Beira-Mar (R)	34	8	5	21	33	54	−21	21	Relegation to Segunda Divisão de Honra
18	Vitória de Setúbal (R)	34	3	13	18	25	45	−20	19	Relegation to Segunda Divisão de Honra

Source: Primeira Divisão
Rules for classification: 1st points, 2nd head-to-head, 3rd goals average
(C) Champions; (R) Relegated

== Results ==
Home \ Away	BEM	BEL	BEN	BOA	BRA	CHA	EST	FAR	GVI	MAR	POR	SAL	SCP	TIR	ULE	UNI	VGU	VSE
Beira-Mar		3–2	1–2	3–1	2–0	4–2	2–0	1–3	0–0	1–0	0–2	1–2	0–1	1–0	2–2	1–1	2–3	1–1
Belenenses	3–0		1–1	3–1	0–1	3–1	0–0	1–0	1–1	1–0	0–2	1–0	0–1	0–1	0–0	3–0	1–2	1–0
Benfica	2–0	2–1		4–1	1–1	5–0	3–1	2–1	0–1	3–0	1–1	3–0	1–2	1–0	1–1	3–1	1–3	1–0
Boavista	1–0	1–0	1–3		0–0	1–4	2–1	2–1	1–1	1–0	1–2	1–0	1–1	2–0	2–0	3–1	1–1	0–0
Braga	1–0	4–2	0–2	1–2		1–0	2–0	0–0	1–1	2–2	1–4	2–1	0–2	0–0	2–0	2–0	3–1	2–1
Chaves	3–2	0–0	0–1	3–1	1–0		1–0	1–2	2–1	1–1	0–4	0–1	1–2	0–0	1–1	5–1	1–1	0–0
Estrela da Amadora	1–1	2–3	0–0	1–0	4–0	1–1		2–1	1–1	1–1	0–1	4–0	0–2	0–0	2–3	1–1	1–1	0–0
Farense	3–0	1–0	4–1	1–0	0–1	2–0	2–0		2–0	4–0	0–3	1–0	0–2	1–0	1–1	2–1	3–0	2–0
Gil Vicente	0–1	1–1	1–0	1–2	3–2	2–0	1–1	1–1		3–2	0–1	0–0	1–2	0–1	1–1	0–0	2–2	3–0
Marítimo	3–2	3–0	0–3	2–0	1–1	4–1	0–0	2–1	1–0		2–1	2–2	0–2	1–0	2–0	1–0	2–3	3–2
Porto	3–0	1–0	2–1	4–2	2–0	2–0	0–0	2–0	1–0	4–1		5–2	1–1	2–0	4–0	3–0	3–0	2–0
Salgueiros	2–1	1–0	1–2	2–1	0–0	3–1	6–0	0–3	1–1	0–0	1–2		2–3	0–2	2–2	0–2	0–0	3–2
Sporting CP	2–0	2–1	1–0	2–2	3–1	1–0	0–1	1–1	1–0	2–0	0–1	1–0		2–0	4–0	4–0	2–0	2–2
Tirsense	2–0	3–0	1–3	2–1	1–0	0–1	3–1	3–0	3–1	0–1	0–2	1–3	1–1		2–1	2–0	3–3	1–0
União de Leiria	3–1	1–0	1–0	1–1	2–1	1–0	1–0	5–0	3–0	2–2	0–2	2–1	0–3	1–0		1–2	2–1	1–0
União da Madeira	1–0	0–1	0–2	1–1	0–0	0–1	0–1	3–0	2–0	2–2	0–0	0–4	1–1	1–1	1–0		3–3	3–0
Vitória de Guimarães	1–0	3–0	1–3	2–0	4–2	1–0	1–0	2–0	3–1	0–0	0–1	3–1	2–2	1–0	3–0	2–1		1–1
Vitória de Setúbal	1–0	0–0	1–2	1–3	0–0	0–1	0–0	1–1	0–1	0–0	2–3	1–2	1–1	1–2	2–2	4–1	1–0	

Source: Foradejogo (in Portuguese)
Legend: Blue = home team win; Yellow = draw; Red = away team win.

== Top goalscorers ==
Rank	Player	Club	Goals
1	(Morocco) Hassan	Farense	21
2	(Portugal) Domingos	Porto	19
3	(Portugal) Marcelo	Tirsense	17
4	(Brazil) Artur	Boavista	16
5	(Brazil) Edmilson	Salgueiros	15
6	(Brazil) Isaías	Benfica	14
6	(Brazil) Edinho	Chaves	14
6	(Portugal) Paulo Alves	Marítimo	14
9	(Brazil) Nélson Bertolazzi	Leiria	12
10	(Canada) Alex Bunbury	Marítimo	11

== Attendances ==
#	Club	Average
1	Porto	31,941
2	Sporting	30,059
3	Benfica	24,000
4	Marítimo	10,294
5	Vitória SC	10,235
6	Braga	8,353
7	Farense	7,235
8	Leiria	6,471
9	Vitória FC	6,382
10	Beira-Mar	5,941
11	Chaves	5,706
12	Os Belenenses	5,176
13	Salgueiros	4,765
14	Tirsense	4,765
15	Gil Vicente	4,588
16	Boavista	4,529
17	Estrela da Amadora	4,029
18	CF União	2,047
