= 1991–92 Segunda Divisão de Honra =

58th season of second-tier football league in Portugal

Segunda Divisão de Honra
- Season: 1991–92
- Champions: SC Espinho
- Promoted: SC Espinho; Os Belenenses; FC Tirsense
- Relegated: Académico Viseu; Portimonense SC; SC Olhanense

The 1991–92 Segunda Divisão de Honra season was the second season of the competition and the 58th season of recognised second-tier football in Portugal.

== Overview ==
The league was contested by 18 teams with SC Espinho winning the championship and gaining promotion to the Primeira Divisão along with Os Belenenses and FC Tirsense. At the other end of the table Académico Viseu, Portimonense SC and SC Olhanense were relegated to the Segunda Divisão.

== League standings ==
Pos	Team	Pld	W	D	L	GF	GA	GD	Pts	Promotion or relegation
1	Espinho (C, P)	34	17	16	1	63	28	+35	50	Promotion to Primeira Divisão
2	Belenenses (P)	34	19	10	5	53	25	+28	48	Promotion to Primeira Divisão
3	Tirsense (P)	34	16	13	5	31	14	+17	45	Promotion to Primeira Divisão
4	Rio Ave	34	16	7	11	47	30	+17	39	
5	Vitória de Setúbal	34	17	5	12	48	35	+13	39	
6	Académica	34	13	11	10	37	25	+12	37	
7	Leixões	34	12	11	11	31	26	+5	35	
8	União de Leiria	34	13	9	12	34	32	+2	35	
9	Desportivo das Aves	34	12	11	11	38	37	+1	35	
10	Louletano	34	14	6	14	41	42	−1	34	
11	Estrela da Amadora	34	10	13	11	30	35	−5	33	
12	Feirense	34	12	8	14	36	43	−7	32	
13	Ovarense	34	9	13	12	38	42	−4	31	
14	Nacional Funchal	34	6	13	15	26	42	−16	25	
15	Benfica Castelo Branco	34	6	12	16	28	51	−23	24	
16	Académico de Viseu (R)	34	7	10	17	20	44	−24	24	Relegation to Segunda Divisão B
17	Portimonense (R)	34	7	10	17	34	59	−25	24	Relegation to Segunda Divisão B
18	Olhanense (R)	34	6	10	18	20	45	−25	22	Relegation to Segunda Divisão B

(C) Champions; (P) Promoted; (R) Relegated
