= Ernesto Paulo =

Brazilian football manager

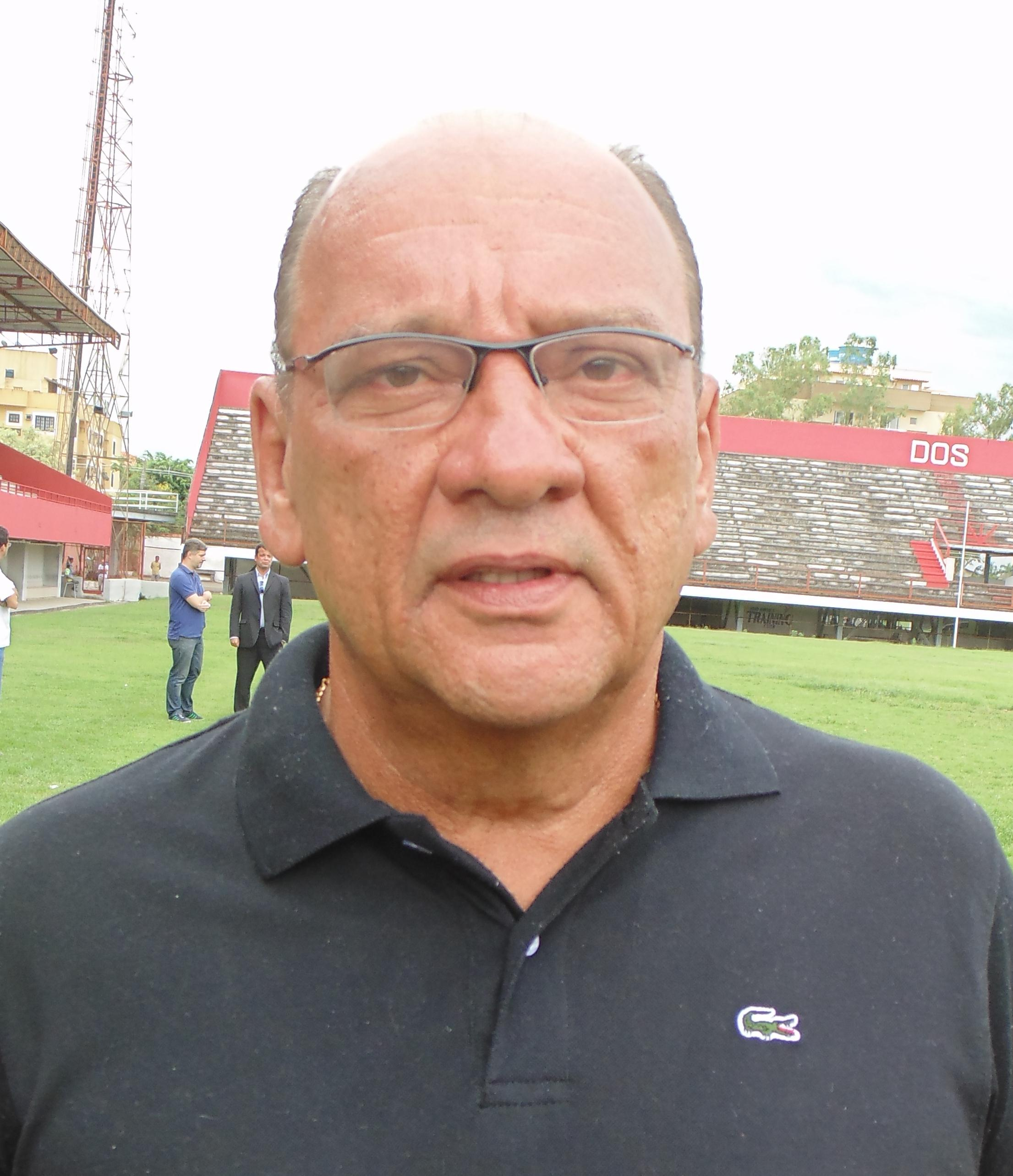

Personal information
- Full name: Ernesto Paulo Ferreira Calainho
- Date of birth: 2 February 1954 (age 72)
- Place of birth: Rio de Janeiro, Brazil

Managerial career
- Years: Team
- 1986: Rio Negro-RR
- 1986: Tuna Luso
- 1986: Fluminense U20
- 1990: Flamengo U20
- 1991: Botafogo
- 1991: Brasil U20
- 1991: Brasil
- 1992: Brasil Olympic
- 1992–1997: União da Madeira
- 1998: XV de Piracicaba
- 1999: CRB
- 1999: Vila Nova
- 1999: União São João
- 2000–2001: Juventude
- 2001: Botafogo-SP
- 2004–2006: União da Madeira
- 2006: Veranópolis
- 2007: Juventus-SC
- 2008: Campo Grande
- 2010: Saudi Arabia Olympic
- 2011: Cabofriense
- 2014: América

Ernesto Paulo Ferreira Calainho known as Ernesto Paulo (born 2 February 1954 in Rio de Janeiro) is a Brazilian professional football manager.

== Career ==
Since 1986 he coached the Rio Negro-RR, Tuna Luso, Fluminense (youth), Flamengo (youth) and Botafogo.

As a manager Brasil U20 in 1991, he won the South American Championship (Under 20). It was also the coach of the Brasil Olympic in the Pre-Olympic Tournament 1992 held in Paraguay. The team failed to qualify for the Football Tournament Barcelona Olympics.

He led the Brazil national football team in the September 11, 1991 match, when Brazil was defeated by Wales by 1-0 at the National Arms Park stadium in Wales. Later, he coached the União da Madeira, XV de Piracicaba, CRB, Vila Nova, União São João, Juventude, Botafogo-SP, Veranópolis, Juventus-SC, Campo Grande, Saudi Arabia Olympic, Cabofriense and América-RJ.

== Titles ==
Flamengo

- Copa São Paulo de Futebol Júnior: 1

1990

Brasil sub-20

- South American Championship (Under 20): 1

1991
