= Rio Ave F.C. =

Portuguese professional football club

Rio Ave
- Full name: Rio Ave Futebol Clube
- Nicknames: Vilacondenses; Rioavistas
- Short name: RAFC
- Founded: 18 January 1939; 87 years ago
- Stadium: Estádio do Rio Ave FC
- Capacity: 5,300
- Owner: Evangelos Marinakis
- President: Alexandrina Cruz
- Head coach: Vasco Seabra
- League: Primeira Liga
- 2025–26: Primeira Liga, 12th of 18
- Website: rioavefc.pt
Home colours	Away colours

Rio Ave Futebol Clube, commonly known as Rio Ave ([ˈʁi.u ˈavɨ]), is a Portuguese professional football club based in Vila do Conde, that competes in the Primeira Liga. The club is named after the Ave River, which flows through the town and into the Atlantic Ocean.

Founded in 1939, they play their home matches at Estádio do Rio Ave FC, also known as the Estádio dos Arcos. Built in 1985, the current stadium seats approximately 5,300 people.

The club's home colours are green and white striped shirts. Meanwhile, the shorts and socks have historically alternated between green or white. Portuguese internationals Alfredo, Paulinho Santos, Quim, Rui Jorge and Fábio Coentrão started their careers at the club. Goalkeepers Jan Oblak and Ederson are some famous talents that were part of this side.

The Vilacondenses' best top-tier league finish was fifth in the 1981–82, 2017–18 and 2019–20 seasons. They reached the 1984 Taça de Portugal Final, where they lost to Porto 4–1, and the 2014 Taça de Portugal Final, where they lost to Benfica 1–0. With this result, Rio Ave qualified for the 2014–15 UEFA Europa League, their first participation in a major European competition.

== History ==
Rio Ave was founded in 1939, soon being nicknamed Rio Grande (Big River). The side had two of its best moments in the 1980s, under the management of Félix Mourinho, father of José Mourinho: in 1981–82, the club finished in a joint-best fifth place, and two years later it reached the Taça de Portugal final, losing to Porto 4–1.

In 2013–14, the club reached both cup finals under the management of Nuno Espírito Santo, but lost to treble-winners Benfica in both. This qualified them to their first European campaign, the 2014–15 UEFA Europa League. New manager Pedro Martins led them past Swedish duo IFK Göteborg and IF Elfsborg to reach the group stage, where they came last.

Under Miguel Cardoso, Rio Ave came fifth in 2017–18, equalling their best finish. Two years later, with Carlos Carvalhal in charge and Iranian Mehdi Taremi the league's joint top scorer, the club equalled this position with a new points record of 55. In October 2020, the team reached the Europa League playoffs but lost at home to A.C. Milan, having conceded a penalty equaliser in the last minute of extra time and then losing 9–8 on penalties. The season, under the returning Cardoso, ended with relegation after a 5–0 aggregate defeat to F.C. Arouca in the playoffs.

After relegation, Rio Ave signed 35-year-old manager Luís Freire, who won promotion as champions in 2021–22 and was rewarded with a new contract.

In 2023, Rio Ave's affiliated paying members (sócios) approved the creation of a SAD and the entry of an investor, the Greek Evangelos Marinakis, who had already invested in Olympiacos and Nottingham Forest.

== European record ==
=== UEFA club competition record ===
Season	Competition	Round	Club	Home	Away	Aggregate
2014–15	UEFA Europa League	3Q	(Sweden) IFK Göteborg	0–0	1–0	1–0
2014–15	UEFA Europa League	PO	(Sweden) IF Elfsborg	1–0	1–2	2–2 (a)
2014–15	UEFA Europa League	Group J	(Ukraine) Dynamo Kyiv	0–3	0–2	4th place
2014–15	UEFA Europa League	Group J	(Romania) Steaua București	2–2	1–2	4th place
2014–15	UEFA Europa League	Group J	(Denmark) Aalborg	2–0	0–1	4th place
2016–17	UEFA Europa League	3Q	(Czech Republic) Slavia Prague	1–1	0–0	1–1 (a)
2018–19	UEFA Europa League	2Q	(Poland) Jagiellonia Białystok	4–4	0–1	4–5
2020–21	UEFA Europa League	2Q	(Bosnia and Herzegovina) Borac Banja Luka	—N/a	2–0	—N/a
2020–21	UEFA Europa League	3Q	(Turkey) Beşiktaş	—N/a	1–1 (4–2 p)	—N/a
2020–21	UEFA Europa League	PO	(Italy) Milan	2–2 (8–9 p)	—N/a	—N/a

==== Notes ====
3Q: Third qualifying round
PO: Play-off round
GS: Group stage

=== UEFA coefficient ===
Correct as of 21 May 2025.

Rank	Team	Points
131	(Portugal) Santa Clara	12.453
132	(Portugal) Paços de Ferreira	12.453
133	(Portugal) Rio Ave	12.453
134	(Kazakhstan) Astana	12.000
135	(Croatia) Rijeka	12.000

== Players ==
=== First team ===
==== Current squad ====
As of 18 November 2026

Note: Flags indicate national team as defined under FIFA eligibility rules; some limited exceptions apply. Players may hold more than one non-FIFA nationality.

No.	Pos.	Nation	Player
1	GK	POL	Cezary Miszta
2	DF	POR	Zé Carlos
3	DF	COL	Simón García
5	MF	GRE	Andreas Ntoi
6	DF	ENG	Nelson Abbey
7	FW	BRA	Diogo Bezerra
8	MF	BRA	Ryan Guilherme
9	FW	GBS	Tamble Monteiro
10	MF	CRC	Brandon Aguilera
11	FW	ESP	Jalen Blesa
13	DF	FRA	Julien Lomboto
14	DF	CZE	Jakub Brabec (vice-captain)
17	DF	GRE	Marios Vrousai (captain)
19	MF	FRA	Malik Sellouki
20	DF	POR	João Tomé
21	FW	CZE	Radek Šiler

No.	Pos.	Nation	Player
22	GK	CRC	Kevin Chamorro
23	DF	ARG	Francisco Petrasso (3rd captain)
24	DF	POR	Pedro Amaral
27	FW	ARG	Tobías Medina
30	FW	SVK	Roland Galčík
32	GK	BRA	Vitor Hugo
39	DF	BRA	Gustavo Mancha (on loan from Olympiacos)
44	MF	HUN	Tamás Nikitscher
54	MF	GRE	Georgios Liavas
68	DF	BRA	Caike
70	MF	SEN	Antoine Wenck
77	FW	CRO	Dario Špikić
79	MF	POR	Miguel Patrício
80	FW	TOG	Sebastian Clemmensen
90	MF	POR	Diogo Nascimento (on loan from Olympiacos)
99	GK	NED	Ennio van der Gouw

==== Out on loan ====
Note: Flags indicate national team as defined under FIFA eligibility rules; some limited exceptions apply. Players may hold more than one non-FIFA nationality.

No.	Pos.	Nation	Player
—	FW	BRA	Rafael Lobato (at AVS until 30 June 2027)

=== U23 squad ===
As of 18 November 2026

Note: Flags indicate national team as defined under FIFA eligibility rules; some limited exceptions apply. Players may hold more than one non-FIFA nationality.

No.	Pos.	Nation	Player
—	GK	ALB	Antzelo Sina
—	GK	UKR	Ostap Mykhailiuk
—	GK	POR	Rodrigo Real
—	DF	POR	Filipe Azevedo
—	DF	POR	Francisco Brás
—	DF	POR	Francisco Pimentel
—	DF	GRE	Georgios Lemonakis
—	DF	POR	Guilherme Venâncio
—	DF	FRA	Matheo Chaigne
—	DF	BRA	Rodrigo Martins
—	DF	POR	Tomé Almeida
—	DF	BRA	Vinicius Cressi
—	MF	POR	Amadu Camará

No.	Pos.	Nation	Player
—	MF	GBS	Dai Baldé
—	MF	ALB	Dijar Ferati
—	MF	POR	Gonçalo Dantas
—	MF	POR	Miguel Teniz
—	MF	POR	Rodrigo Fernandes
—	FW	POR	Alex Sousa
—	FW	POR	Diogo Cordeiro
—	FW	BRA	Eduardo Barros
—	FW	POR	Francisco Curvelo
—	FW	POR	Leonardo Ferreira
—	FW	POR	Luís Rasgado
—	FW	POR	Rodrigo Moreira
—	FW	BRA	Samuel Alves

== Club staff ==
=== Coaching staff ===
As of 7 November 2026

Role	Name
Head Coach	(Portugal) Vasco Seabra
Assistant coach	(Portugal) Augusto Gama
Assistant coach	(Portugal) Nuno Diogo
Assistant coach	(Portugal) Cláudio Botelho
Goalkeeping coach	(Croatia) Mario Galinović
Conditioning coach	(Portugal) Bruno Pereira
Analyst	(Portugal) Pedro Gomes

== Honours ==
=== National competitions ===
- Taça de Portugal
  - Runners-up (2): 1983–84, 2013–14
- Taça da Liga
  - Runners-up (1): 2013–14
- Supertaça de Portugal
  - Runners-up (1): 2014
- Segunda Divisão / Liga Portugal 2
  - Winners (4): 1985–86, 1995–96, 2002–03, 2021–22
- Terceira Divisão
  - Winners (1): 1976–77

=== Regional competitions ===
- AF Porto Cup
  - Winners (1): 1966–67

=== Personnel honours ===
- SJPF Player of the Month
  - Evandro – December 2003
  - João Tomás – November 2009, November 2010
- SJPF Young Player of the Month
  - Miguel Lopes – October 2008, November 2008
  - Yazalde – February 2009
  - Fábio Faria – November 2009, December 2009
  - Vítor Gomes – October 2011

== Coaching history ==
- (Portugal) Artur Quaresma (1976–78)
- (Portugal) Pedro Gomes (1978–79)
- (Portugal) Fernando Cabrita (1979–81)
- (Portugal) Félix Mourinho (1981–82)
- (Portugal) Pedro Gomes (1982–83)
- (Portugal) Félix Mourinho (1983–85)
- (Portugal) Mário Reis (1985–86)
- (Brazil) Abel Braga (1986)
- (Portugal) António Morais (1986–87)
- (Brazil) Mário Juliato (1987–88)
- (Portugal) Mário Reis (1988–89)
- (Portugal) Nicolau Vaqueiro (1989)
- (Portugal) Eurico Gomes (1989–90)
- (Portugal) Mário Reis (1990–91)
- (Portugal) Augusto Inácio (1991–92)
- (Portugal) Vieira Nunes (1992)
- (Portugal) José Rachão (1992–93)
- (Portugal) Quinito (1993–94)
- (Portugal) Jaime Pacheco (1994–95)
- (Brazil) Abel Braga (1995)
- (Portugal) Henrique Calisto (1995–96)
- (Portugal) Carlos Brito (1 July 1996 – 30 June 2000)
- (Portugal) Vítor Oliveira (1 July 2000 – 7 Nov 2001)
- (Portugal) Horácio Gonçalves (13 Nov 2001 – 29 Oct 2002)
- (Portugal) Carlos Brito (30 Oct 2002 – 30 June 2005)
- (Portugal) António Sousa (1 July 2005 – 28 Feb 2006)
- (Portugal) João Eusébio (28 Feb 2006 – 5 Jan 2009)
- (Portugal) Carlos Brito (6 Jan 2009 – 15 May 2012)
- (Portugal) Nuno Espírito Santo (1 July 2012 – 19 May 2014)
- (Portugal) Pedro Martins (22 May 2014 – 17 May 2016)
- (Portugal) Capucho (20 May 2016 – 10 Nov 2016)
- (Portugal) Luís Castro (14 Nov 2016 – 12 June 2017)
- (Portugal) Miguel Cardoso (12 June 2017 – 12 June 2018)
- (Portugal) José Gomes (13 June 2018 – 22 December 2018)
- (Portugal) Augusto Gama (interim) (23 December 2018 – 3 January 2019)
- (Portugal) Daniel Ramos (3 January 2019 – 30 June 2019)
- (Portugal) Carlos Carvalhal (1 July 2019 – 2 August 2020)
- (Portugal) Mário Silva (3 August 2020 – 30 December 2020)
- (Portugal) Pedro Cunha (interim) (30 December 2020 – 29 January 2021)
- (Portugal) Miguel Cardoso (29 January 2021 – 27 May 2021)
- (Portugal) Luís Freire (1 July 2021 – 5 November 2024)
- (Portugal) Petit (7 November 2024 – 17 May 2025)
- (Greece) Sotiris Sylaidopoulos (27 June 2025 – 1 October 2026)
- (Portugal) Vasco Seabra (4 October 2026 – present)

== League and cup history ==
Season	Div.	Pos.	Pl.	W	D	L	GS	GA	P	Cup	League Cup	Notes
1978–79	2DS	2	30	20	5	5	51	26	45	Round 4		Promoted
1979–80	1D	16	30	5	3	22	22	61	13	Round 4		Relegated
1980–81	2DS	1	30	16	10	4	43	17	42	Round 3		Promoted
1981–82	1D	5	30	13	8	9	26	31	34	Round 5		^{[A]}
1982–83	1D	8	30	13	3	14	43	45	29	Round 3		
1983–84	1D	9	30	11	7	12	35	35	29	Runner-up		^{[B]}
1984–85	1D	13	30	7	9	14	27	43	23	Quarter-final		Relegated
1985–86	2DN	1	30	19	11	0	52	19	49	Round 4		Promoted
1986–87	1D	13	30	8	9	13	33	40	25	Round 5		
1987–88	1D	18	38	7	14	17	29	67	28	Round 6		Relegated
1988–89	2DS	4	34	16	9	9	51	30	41	Round 3		
1989–90	2DS	10	34	10	11	13	44	47	31	Round 3		
1990–91	2DS	4	38	23	10	5	79	21	56	Round 6		Promoted
1991–92	2H	4	34	16	7	11	47	30	39	Round 5		
1992–93	2H	5	34	14	10	10	39	36	38	Round 5		
1993–94	2H	4	34	18	8	8	43	23	44	Quarter-final		
1994–95	2H	11	34	12	8	14	47	46	32	Round 6		
1995–96	2H	1	34	21	5	8	58	42	68	Round 5		Promoted
1996–97	1D	15	34	8	11	15	35	42	35	Round 4		
1997–98	1D	9	34	12	10	12	43	43	46	Round 5		
1998–99	1D	14	34	8	11	15	26	47	35	Round 4		
1999–00	1D	17	34	8	9	17	34	54	33	Semi-final		Relegated
2000–01	2H	5	34	17	9	8	68	35	60	Round 6		
2001–02	2H	8	34	12	10	12	45	36	46	Round 3		
2002–03	2H	1	34	19	6	9	49	36	63	Round 5		Promoted
2003–04	1D	7	34	12	12	10	42	37	48	Quarter-final		
2004–05	1D	8	34	10	17	7	35	35	47	Round 6		
2005–06	1D	16	34	8	10	16	34	53	34	Round 5		Relegated
2006–07	2H	3	30	15	8	7	44	37	53	Round 4		
2007–08	2H	2	30	13	12	5	38	26	51	Round 6	Round 1	Promoted
2008–09	1D	12	30	8	6	16	20	35	30	Round 3	Second Group Stage	
2009–10	1D	12	30	6	13	11	22	33	31	Semi-final	Second Group Stage	
2010–11	1D	8	30	10	8	12	35	33	38	Quarter-final	Round 1	
2011–12	1D	14	30	7	7	16	33	42	28	Round 4	Second Group Stage	
2012–13	1D	6	30	12	6	12	35	42	42	Round 4	Semi-final	
2013–14	1D	11	30	8	8	14	21	35	32	Runner-up	Runner-up	Qualified Europa League ^{[B]} ^{[C]}
2014–15	1D	10	34	10	13	11	38	42	43	Semi-final	Second Group Stage	
2015–16	1D	6	34	14	8	12	44	44	50	Semi-final	Second Group Stage	Qualified Europa League
2016–17	1D	7	34	14	7	13	41	39	49	Round 3	Group stage	
2017–18	1D	5	34	15	6	13	40	42	51	Quarter-final	Group stage	Qualified Europa League ^{[A]}
2018–19	1D	7	34	12	9	13	50	52	45	Round 5	Group stage	
2019–20	1D	5	34	15	10	9	48	36	55	Quarter-final	Group stage	Qualified Europa League ^{[A]}
2020–21	1D	16	34	7	13	13	25	40	34	Round 5	DNP	Relegated

^A Best league classification finish in the club's history.
^B Best cup run in the club's history.
^C Best league cup run in the club's history.

Div. = Division; 1D = Portuguese League; 2H = Liga de Honra; 2DS/2D = Portuguese Second Division

Pos. = Position; Pl = Match played; W = Win; D = Draw; L = Lost; GS = Goal scored; GA = Goal against; P = Points
