= 1993–94 Segunda Divisão de Honra =

60th season of second-tier football league in Portugal

Segunda Divisão de Honra
- Season: 1993–94
- Champions: FC Tirsense
- Promoted: FC Tirsense; UD Leiria; GD Chaves
- Relegated: Académico Viseu; Louletano DC; Leixões SC

The 1993–94 Segunda Divisão de Honra season was the fourth season of the competition and the 60th season of recognised second-tier football in Portugal.

== Overview ==
The league was contested by 18 teams with FC Tirsense winning the championship and gaining promotion to the Primeira Divisão along with UD Leiria and GD Chaves. At the other end of the table Académico Viseu, Louletano DC and Leixões SC were relegated to the Segunda Divisão.

== League standings ==
Pos	Team	Pld	W	D	L	GF	GA	GD	Pts	Promotion or relegation
1	Tirsense (C, P)	34	17	12	5	42	23	+19	46	Promotion to Primeira Divisão
2	União de Leiria (P)	34	19	7	8	46	19	+27	45	Promotion to Primeira Divisão
3	Chaves (P)	34	19	7	8	44	25	+19	45	Promotion to Primeira Divisão
4	Rio Ave	34	18	8	8	43	23	+20	44	
5	Académica	34	17	4	13	39	30	+9	38	
6	Felgueiras	34	12	13	9	40	36	+4	37	
7	Ovarense	34	11	11	12	43	43	0	33	
8	Leça	34	15	3	16	39	54	−15	33	
9	Campomaiorense	34	13	7	14	43	46	−3	33	
10	Desportivo das Aves	34	12	8	14	36	45	−9	32	
11	Nacional	34	10	11	13	32	33	−1	31	
12	Portimonense	34	11	8	15	44	47	−3	30	
13	Torreense	34	8	14	12	28	34	−6	30	
14	Espinho	34	8	13	13	30	43	−13	29	
15	Penafiel	34	12	4	18	30	45	−15	28	
16	Académico de Viseu (R)	34	9	9	16	33	44	−11	27	Relegation to Segunda Divisão B
17	Louletano (R)	34	10	7	17	44	49	−5	27	Relegation to Segunda Divisão B
18	Leixões (R)	34	8	8	18	24	41	−17	24	Relegation to Segunda Divisão B

(C) Champions; (P) Promoted; (R) Relegated
