= 1999–2000 S.L. Benfica season =

Benfica
1999–2000 season
- President: João Vale e Azevedo
- Head coach: Jupp Heynckes
- Stadium: Estádio da Luz
- Primeira Liga: 3rd
- Taça de Portugal: Sixth round
- UEFA Cup: Third round
- Top goalscorer: League: Nuno Gomes (18); All: Nuno Gomes (20)
- Highest home attendance: 75,000 v Sporting CP (9 January 2000)
- Lowest home attendance: 3,000 v Amora (12 January 2000)
- Biggest win: Benfica 7–0 Amora (12 January 2000)
- Biggest defeat: Celta de Vigo 7–0 Benfica (25 November 1999)
Home colours	Away colours

The 1999–2000 season was Sport Lisboa e Benfica's 96th season in existence and the club's 66th consecutive season in the top flight of Portuguese football. It ran from 1 July 1999 to 30 June 2000. Benfica competed domestically in the Primeira Liga and the Taça de Portugal. The club also participated in the UEFA Cup, by virtue of finishing third in that tournament the previous season.

After sacking Scottish coach Graeme Souness, Benfica appointed UEFA Champions League-winning manager Jupp Heynckes. Limited by ongoing financial difficulties, the club signings consisted of players either on the books, free transfers or loans, such as with the Spaniards Chano and Tote, the former on a free deal, and the latter on loan. Tote arrived to replace Rushfeldt, who signed and practised with the team, before being recalled by Rosenborg with disagreements over his transfer. Benfica started their campaign with a six-game winning streak in their first seven league games, topping the league until December; when a record-setting loss to Celta de Vigo, the greatest in its history, negatively affected the team mentality, causing them to drop to third place in Matchday 19, which would become their final position, finishing eight points behind Sporting, but securing a position in the upcoming season's UEFA Cup.

In total Benfica won 21 league matches, drew 6 and lost 7. Nuno Gomes was the season topscorer with 20 goals, of which 18 occurred in the Primeira Liga.

== Summary ==
=== Pre-season ===
After a season which saw Graeme Souness sacked, the club looked for more experience and chose Jupp Heynckes on 30 May. During a 20-year career, the German manager had won titles for Bayern Munich and Real Madrid and was the first manager in 32 years to clinch a European title for Madrid the previous year.

The pre-season, which began in early July, included nine preparation matches in Portugal and abroad. From 18 to 31 July, the team played six matches against German teams. Their first game in Lisbon was against Bayern Munich on 10 August, and four days later they participated in the Trofeo Memorial Nereo Rocco against AC Milan.

Heynckes immediately requested signings in all three positions: defence, midfield and attack. Although the club scouted Hanuch (signed by Sporting) and Claudio Husaín for the midfield, the only players to join the team were Maniche and Marco Freitas (both on the club payroll and returning from one-year loans to Alverca). For attack Benfica considered Barcelona player Giovanni (who said, "It would be an honour for me to work with Heynckes") but ultimately signed Chano, a 34-year-old Spanish player from CD Tenerife.

The club was involved in a transfer saga over Norwegian striker Rushfeldt. He signed and practised with the team but left after Rosenborg claimed there were financial issues related to his transfer. He was replaced by Tote, on loan from Real Madrid, with the club president saying that "Tote was always the first choice" and Rushfeldt "did not have the personality or mental strength to play for Benfica".

Goalkeeper Michel Preud'homme retired at age 39. Arriving in 1994, he made nearly 200 appearances over five seasons and became a fan favourite. Benfica hired two replacements: Argentine Carlos Bossio and German Robert Enke. Heynckes described Bossio as the "more experienced" goalkeeper, with "a great talent", but also defining Enke as a "good, young goalkeeper; a promise". The Argentine had appearances on his national team and was the first choice at Estudiantes, while the German had its breakthrough at Borussia Mönchengladbach only a few months earlier. However, in a pre-season game against Bayern Munich Bossio conceded two goals: "I am calm, although we lost the game and my performance led to some 'scolding'." Enke confidently stepped into the position: "If I do not make mistakes, there will be no reason to change goalkeepers."

=== August and September ===
Benfica visited Vila do Conde for their opening Primeira Liga game on 22 August. Although Sérgio Nunes scored in the ninth minute, Hugo Henrique of the home team equalised it minutes later for a 1–1 draw. During the last week of August Benfica hosted Salgueiros, scoring one goal and missing a number of opportunities to increase their lead. Record entitled its article "If the Spaniard was a goalscorer it would have been a slaughter", referring to the wastefulness of Tote.

On 12 September Benfica visited Azores and beat Santa Clara 3–0 to move to top of the league table, tied with five other teams. Four days later the club started their European campaign, facing Dinamo Bucuresti at home. They lost 1–0, when a shot by Nastase slipped through Enke's legs. In the title race, Benfica led the table after defeating Vitória Setúbal. Newspaper Record portrayed the game as easy win for the club, writing, "Nothing better to raise morale than to win comfortably, without rush, without pushing, without any problem whatsoever."

Before their European game, the team travelled to Faro to defend their lead. They won their fourth consecutive match, with Nuno Gomes scoring his fourth goal in five games. At the end of September, Benfica travelled to Romania to play Dinamo Bucuresti. After a first-half goal by Maniche, Chano scored in the 71st minute to send Benfica into second round.

=== October and November ===
The club's momentum continued into October, when they defeated Estrela da Amadora with two second-half goals; Record summarized that the goals, "Finished the game off when it was most needed". On 16 October Benfica visited Barcelos, and increased their lead to four points over second-place FC Porto. In Europe, the club defeated PAOK in Greece, taking an advantage back to Portugal for the second leg.

In their eighth Primeira Liga match Benfica hosted Boavista F.C., settling for a draw after Whelliton scored in the 80th minute. It was the first time since late August that Benfica dropped points. For their last October game, they visited Alverca to face the local team, F.C. Alverca. Benfica lost their first league match; with a display that Record characterized as being under a Halloween spell; that resulted in "their worst performance of the season, and seeing Porto close in on the top of the table."

On 4 November, Benfica hosted PAOK for the second leg of their European qualifier. They lost 2–1 in normal time, requiring extra time and a penalty shootout to decide the match. The Lisbon side converted all their shots, progressing into the next round. Four days later, the club defeated S.C. Braga by one goal in a league match to open a three-point lead.

After a one-week break for the Taça de Portugal, Benfica visited Estádio das Antas for the Clássico against Porto. They lost 2–0 with goals from Capucho and Jardel, and the title-holders reduced Benfica's league lead to one point. In João Marcelino view, "The game between Porto and Benfica had to forcibly answer some questions — and it did not disappoint expectations. The easy win by Fernando Santos' team clearly showed who still is, almost six years later, the best team in domestic football; and the way that Jupp Heynckes accepted defeat could be used as evidence that he has been pushing his players to their current limit."

The following Thursday, Benfica visited Vigo for the third round of the UEFA Cup. Benfica made club history in the match; at half-time they were already losing 4–0, and three more goals in the second half broke the record for goals conceded, in their worst defeat ever. At their next training session hundreds of fans booed the team, and the club president compelled his players to apologize for their performance. Team captain João Pinto read a statement: "To Benfica, and to their supporters; aware of the abnormality of the result from the match in Vigo; the players, represented by the captain and vice-captain, publicly acknowledge that they didn't perform to club standards. We promise to redouble our commitment, towards dignifying this club. To them and to the millions of fans, we formally apologize." November's final game, a 2–0 victory over Campomaiorense, retained Benfica's league lead.

=== December and January ===
Benfica began December with a draw against Belenenses, with Porto's victory ensuring they surpassed Benfica in the league table. The team performance was at such a level that it allowed Record to claim, "The goalscoring chances could be counted on the fingers of a hand." In the second leg of the UEFA Cup against Celta de Vigo, the Spaniards and Heynckes fielded lineups almost entirely composed of reserves and the match ended in a one-all draw. On Matchday 14, Benfica beat U.D. Leiria by 3–2 with "two freak goals ensuring a win.", as Record put it. The final game of the year was a visit to Guimarães. Benfica scored first but allowed Vitória S.C. to come back, losing a third league match. They had not won outside Estádio da Luz since 16 October (when they led by four points), and began the New Year four points behind the leader in third place.

The year started with a Lisbon derby at home. After a scoreless tie, Sporting CP benefited from the points-share and Benfica fell to six points behind Porto. On 12 January the club hosted Amora for the Portuguese Cup, scoring seven goals against the third-tier team. Three days later, Benfica visited Funchal and nearly lost; Record labelled Enke's performance as crucial for Benfica, illustrating, "In the key moment of the game, when Enke defended a penalty in the 10th minute, he saved Benfica from leaving Funchal with a defeat. In a sluggish performance, only new signings Uribe and Machairidis showed good form."

On Matchday 18, Benfica hosted Rio Ave, winning their first league game in a month. Four days later, Benfica again played Sporting for the Portuguese Cup. Losing 3–1, the team were eliminated in their own stadium for the fourth time in club history; the first three were by Sporting in 1962–63, Braga in 1965–66 and Boavista in 1991–92. Benfica ended January with three points away from home for the first time since October, after defeating Salgueiros 2–1 in the Vidal Pinheiro.

=== February and March ===
Now focused on the league, Benfica continued their momentum and defeated Santa Clara at home. Chano was decisive in unlocking the game in the perspective of Record: "He was the vitamin that gave imagination and clarity to Benfica's midfield". They won a fourth consecutive time, beating Vitória de Setúbal in Estádio do Bonfim and gaining ground on Porto and Sporting (both of whom lost points). On 22 February, Benfica hosted Farense knowing that a win would put them one point behind the joint Primeira Liga leaders.

Benfica were surprised by the Faro side's opposition. José Manuel Delgado wrote in his match report for Record: "Heynckes' defence show[ed] inexplicable passivity, and Quinzinho was a loose threat that no one could stop. With an impressive performance, Farense made one, two and nearly three goals". Shortly after the 15-minute mark the Angolan striker was injured and Farense threats stopped, allowing Benfica to turn the match around: "After his substitution Benfica started to settle in the midfield, better supporting the attack ...until Maniche put the threats in practise and scored in the 23rd and 38th minutes, with Nuno Gomes leaving Benfica in the lead before halftime". For their last February match, Benfica visited Estádio José Gomes to face the local team, Estrela da Amadora. Two goals by Gáucho and another by Kenedy gave them their first league loss since 19 December, with Porto and Sporting regaining a four-point lead.

The Lisbon side rebounded with a home win against Gil Vicente F.C.; José Manuel Delgado called the victory "convincing, with moments of good football". The second game in March was at Estádio do Bessa. The match report in Record depicted Benfica's performance as good to begin with ("[Benfica] was better in the first half, scored first and stopped the Boavista press in the beginning of the second half"), until they conceded to Boavista before the final whistle: "[Benfica] receded, receded, until suffering a last-minute goal by Litos with Boavista reduced to ten men." On Matchday 26 Benfica hosted Alverca, defeating them with a late goal by João Tomás and avenging October's loss. The team ended March with a visit to Braga, undefeated by Benfica since 1995–96. Although the team led the game early, another late goal and the subsequent loss allowed both rivals to increase their lead.

=== April and May ===
On 1 April Benfica faced Porto in the second Clássico of the season, and a second-half goal by Sabry helped the club defeat their historic rivals. Gomes Ferreira commented: "The game was perfect for a nil-nil draw, when in the 67th minute a moment of genius decided the game: a great, meaningful goal from Saby, launching Benfica into the title race and hampering Porto". Benfica maintained their momentum on a trip to the Portalegre team, Campomaiorense. An early dismissal of José Soares helped them win easily, with Sabry scoring in a fourth consecutive game.

On 16 April Benfica hosted Lisbon rivals Belenenses, losing 3-2 and dampening any championship hopes. A week later the team lost their second straight match (their seventh defeat of the season) to União de Leiria 2–1, despite scoring first. On 30 April Benfica returned to top form, and in Miguel Costa Nunes opinion, defeated a "debilitated and riddled with internal conflicts" Vitória de Guimarães 3–0.

In the penultimate game of the season, Benfica faced Sporting for the third time; in their previous meetings, the club had tied once and lost once. Sporting, the league leader, was three points away from ending an 18-year drought dating to 1981–82. A late goal by Sabry dashed their hopes, preventing them from winning the title from Benfica. In the aftermath of the game, Record reported in their headline: "Till the end: A late goal from Sabry completely froze the thousands of Sporting fans waiting to celebrate the title", while O Jogo header read "Sabry causes short-circuit in Alvalade". Benfica ended the season with a third consecutive win, beating Madeira side Marítimo 2–1. However, in José Ribeiro's piece for Record, he wrote that Benfica "missed out on a thrashing that the fans and Marítimo deserved". The club finished four points from a Champions League berth and eight behind Sporting, who won their long-awaited title.

== Competitions ==
Win Draw Loss Postponed

=== Overall record ===
Competition	First match	Last match	Record								
Competition	First match	Last match	G	W	D	L	GF	GA	GD	Win %	Source
Primeira Liga	22 August 1999	14 May 2000	34	21	6	7	58	33	+25	61.76	
Taça de Portugal	13 November 1999	26 January 2000	3	2	0	1	9	3	+6	66.67	
UEFA Cup	16 September 1999	9 December 1999	6	2	1	3	6	12	−6	33.33	
Total			43	25	7	11	73	48	+25	58.14	

=== Primeira Liga ===
==== League table ====
Pos	Team	Pld	W	D	L	GF	GA	GD	Pts	Qualification or relegation
1	Sporting CP (C)	34	23	8	3	57	22	+35	77	Qualification to Champions League group stage
2	Porto	34	22	7	5	66	26	+40	73	Qualification to Champions League third qualifying round
3	Benfica	34	21	6	7	58	33	+25	69	Qualification to UEFA Cup first round
4	Boavista	34	16	7	11	40	31	+9	55	Qualification to UEFA Cup qualifying round
5	Gil Vicente	34	14	11	9	48	34	+14	53	

Source: Infordesporto
Rules for classification: 1) points; 2) head-to-head points; 3) head-to-head goal difference; 4) goal difference; 5) number of goals scored
(C) Champions

==== Results by round ====
Round	1	2	3	4	5	6	7	8	9	10	11	12	13	14	15	16	17	18	19	20	21	22	23	24	25	26	27	28	29	30	31	32	33	34
Ground	A	H	A	H	A	H	A	H	A	H	A	H	A	H	A	H	A	H	A	H	A	H	A	H	A	H	A	H	A	H	A	H	A	H
Result	D	W	W	W	W	W	W	D	L	W	L	W	D	W	L	D	D	W	W	W	W	W	L	W	D	W	L	W	W	L	L	W	W	W
Position	11	7	4	1	1	1	1	1	1	1	1	1	2	2	3	3	3	3	3	3	3	3	3	3	3	3	3	3	3	3	3	3	3	3

Source: ForaDeJogo
A = Away; H = Home; W = Win; D = Draw; L = Loss

==== Matches ====
22 August 1999 1	Rio Ave	1–1	Benfica	Vila do Conde
20:15	Hugo Henrique 29'	Report	Sérgio Nunes 9'; Ronaldo (yellow card) 54' (yellow-red card) 54'; Calado (red card) 54'	Stadium: Estádio do Rio Ave FC; Attendance: 20,000; Referee: Jorge Coroado

29 August 1999 2	Benfica	1–0	Salgueiros	Lisbon
17:00	Nuno Gomes 53'	Report		Stadium: Estádio da Luz; Attendance: 40,000; Referee: Paulo Costa

12 September 1999 3	Santa Clara	0–3	Benfica	Ponta Delgada
21:15		Report	Maniche 23'; Kandaurov 25'; Nuno Gomes 44'	Stadium: Estádio de São Miguel; Attendance: 15,000; Referee: Martins dos Santos

20 September 1999 4	Benfica	3–0	Vitória Setúbal	Lisbon
19:30	Kandaurov 2' (pen.); Maniche 35'; Nuno Gomes 86'	Report	Mário Loja (yellow card) 2' (yellow-red card) 40'	Stadium: Estádio da Luz; Attendance: 26,000; Referee: Jacinto Paixão

25 September 1999 5	Farense	0–1	Benfica	Faro
20:30	Dino (red card) 89'	Report	Nuno Gomes 30'; Maniche (red card) 85'	Stadium: Estádio de São Luís; Attendance: 8,000; Referee: José Pratas

4 October 1999 6	Benfica	2–0	Estrela da Amadora	Lisbon
21:15	Okunowo 50'; Ronaldo 58' (pen.)	Report	Luís Vasco (red card) 57'	Stadium: Estádio da Luz; Attendance: 30,000; Referee: José Leirós

16 October 1999 7	Gil Vicente	0–2	Benfica	Barcelos
19:30		Report	Maniche 66'; Calado 72'	Stadium: Estádio Adelino Ribeiro Novo; Attendance: 12,000; Referee: Paulo Paraty

24 October 1999 8	Benfica	1–1	Boavista	Lisbon
20:45	João Pinto 32'; Tahar (yellow card) 63' (yellow-red card) 73'	Report	Whelliton 80' (yellow card) 70' (yellow-red card) 81'	Stadium: Estádio da Luz; Attendance: 40,000; Referee: Jorge Coroado

31 October 1999 9	Alverca	3–1	Benfica	Alverca
20:00	Milinković 44' (pen.); Anderson Luiz 71', 74'	Report	Nuno Gomes 25'	Stadium: Complexo Desportivo do Alverca FC; Attendance: 7,000; Referee: Paulo Costa

8 November 1999 10	Benfica	2–1	Braga	Lisbon
19:30	Nuno Gomes 12'; Kandaurov 80'	Report	Toni 61'	Stadium: Estádio da Luz; Attendance: 18,000; Referee: Bruno Paixão

20 November 1999 11	Porto	2–0	Benfica	Porto
20:30	Capucho 4'; Jardel 25'	Report		Stadium: Estádio das Antas; Attendance: 48,000; Referee: Lucílio Baptista

29 November 1999 12	Benfica	2–0	Campomaiorense	Lisbon
20:00	Paulo Madeira 8'; Maniche 70'	Report		Stadium: Estádio da Luz; Attendance: 18,000; Referee: Jorge Coroado

4 December 1999 13	Belenenses	0–0	Benfica	Lisbon
20:30		Report		Stadium: Estádio do Restelo; Attendance: 15,000; Referee: Vitor Pereira

13 December 1999 14	Benfica	3–2	União Leiria	Lisbon
20:05	Nuno Gomes 3'; Kandaurov 54'; Maniche 72'	Report	Duah 24', 83'	Stadium: Estádio da Luz; Attendance: 7,500; Referee: Paulo Paraty

19 December 1999 15	Vitória Guimarães	2–1	Benfica	Guimarães
19:00	Brandão 36'; Riva 76'	Report	Nuno Gomes 3'	Stadium: Estádio D. Afonso Henriques; Attendance: 10,000; Referee: José Pratas

9 January 2000 16	Benfica	0–0	Sporting	Lisbon
20:00		Report		Stadium: Estádio da Luz; Attendance: 75,000; Referee: Lucílio Baptista

15 January 2000 17	Maritimo	0–0	Benfica	Funchal
19:00		Report		Stadium: Estádio dos Barreiros; Attendance: 9,000; Referee: Paulo Costa

22 January 2000 18	Benfica	1–0	Rio Ave	Lisbon
19:00	Nuno Gomes 65'	Report		Stadium: Estádio da Luz; Attendance: 20,000; Referee: Jorge Coroado

30 January 2000 19	Salgueiros	1–2	Benfica	Porto
21:15	Basílio Almeida 17'; Ricardo Fernandes (red card) 63'	Report	Poborský 64'; Nuno Gomes 81'	Stadium: Estádio Engenheiro Vidal Pinheiro; Attendance: 4,000; Referee: António Costa

6 February 2000 20	Benfica	1–0	Santa Clara	Lisbon
17:00	Nuno Gomes 55'	Report		Stadium: Estádio da Luz; Attendance: 35,000; Referee: Martins dos Santos

14 February 2000 21	Vitória de Setúbal	1–2	Benfica	Setúbal
20:30	Chiquinho Conde 84'	Report	Poborský 36'; Maniche 87'	Stadium: Estádio do Bonfim; Attendance: 12,000; Referee: José Pratas

20 February 2000 22	Benfica	6–2	Farense	Lisbon
20:00	Maniche 23', 38', 88'; Nuno Gomes 43', 68'; Poborský 58'	Report	Paulo Ferreira 5'; Hassan 8'	Stadium: Estádio da Luz; Attendance: 60,000; Referee: Jacinto Paixão

27 February 2000 23	Estrela da Amadora	3–0	Benfica	Lisbon
20:00	Gaúcho 17', 74'; Kenedy 84'	Report		Stadium: Estádio da Reboleira; Attendance: 10,000; Referee: Jorge Coroado

4 March 2000 24	Benfica	3–0	Gil Vicente	Lisbon
19:00	Nuno Gomes 13', 88'; Carlos 17' (o.g.)	Report		Stadium: Estádio da Luz; Attendance: 20,000; Referee: Paulo Paraty

12 March 2000 25	Boavista	1–1	Benfica	Porto
20:00	Jorge Silva (yellow card) 45' (yellow-red card) 86'; Litos 90'	Report	Kandaurov 29'	Stadium: Estádio do Bessa; Attendance: 7,500; Referee: Vítor Pereira

19 March 2000 26	Benfica	3–2	Alverca	Lisbon
19:00	Sabry 4'; Uribe 14' (pen.); João Tomás 88'	Report	Duda 39', 69'	Stadium: Estádio da Luz; Attendance: 25,000; Referee: Lucílio Baptista

25 March 2000 27	Braga	3–2	Benfica	Braga
20:30	Taílson 16'; Zé Nuno Azevedo 81'; Odair 87'	Report	Sabry 43' (pen.); Nuno Gomes 53'	Stadium: Estádio 1º de Maio; Attendance: 15,000; Referee: Jacinto Paixão

1 April 2000 28	Benfica	1–0	Porto	Lisbon
20:00	Sabry 67'	Report		Stadium: Estádio da Luz; Attendance: 35,000; Referee: Martins dos Santos

8 April 2000 29	Campomaiorense	2–4	Benfica	Campo Maior, Portalegre
20:30	José Soares (red card) 13'; Hugo Cunha 51'; Abílio 90' (pen.)	Report	Sabry 16'; João Pinto 28'; Poborský 34'; Calado 59'	Stadium: Estádio Capitão Cesar Correia; Attendance: 7,500; Referee: José Leirós

16 April 2000 30	Benfica	2–3	Belenenses	Lisbon
19:30	João Tomás 64'; Maniche 67'	Report	Fernando Mendes 22'; Filgueira 38'; Rui Gregório 74'	Stadium: Estádio da Luz; Attendance: 20,000; Referee: Paulo Paraty

21 April 2000 31	União Leiria	2–1	Benfica	Leiria
21:00	Paulo Alves 62'; Dinda 86'	Report	Nuno Gomes 6'	Stadium: Estádio Dr. Magalhães Pessoa; Attendance: 5,000; Referee: Vítor Pereira

30 April 2000 32	Benfica	3–0	Vitória Guimarães	Lisbon
19:00	Poborský 6'; João Pinto 38'; Nuno Gomes 72'	Report		Stadium: Estádio da Luz; Attendance: 5,000; Referee: José Pratas

6 May 2000 33	Sporting	0–1	Benfica	Lisbon
21:30		Report	Sabry 88'	Stadium: Estádio de Alvalade; Attendance: 50,000; Referee: Lucílio Baptista

14 May 2000 34	Benfica	2–1	Maritimo	Lisbon
21:15	Sérgio Nunes 13'; Kandaurov 25'	Report	João Oliveira Pinto 75'	Stadium: Estádio da Luz; Attendance: 15,000; Referee: Mário Mendes

=== Taça de Portugal ===
13 November 1999 Fourth Rd	Benfica	1–0	C.D. Torres Novas	Lisbon
18:00	Tote 81'	Report		Stadium: Estádio da Luz; Attendance: 10,000; Referee: Augusto Duarte

12 January 2000 Fifth Rd	Benfica	7–0	Amora	Lisbon
19:00	Maniche 27'; Uribe 29' (pen.), 86' (pen.); Tote 58', 60'; Porfírio 82'; Nuno Gomes 87'	Report		Stadium: Estádio da Luz; Attendance: 3,000; Referee: Elmano Santos

26 January 2000 Sixth Rd	Benfica	1–3	Sporting	Lisbon
19:00	Uribe 33'; Machairidis (yellow card) 25' (yellow-red card) 71'	Report	Acosta 11', 74' (pen.); André Cruz 42'	Stadium: Estádio da Luz; Attendance: 55,000; Referee: Vítor Pereira

=== UEFA Cup ===
==== First round ====
16 September 1999 First leg	Benfica (Portugal)	0–1	(Romania) Dinamo București	Lisbon
19:00		Report	Valentin Năstase 35'	Stadium: Estádio da Luz; Attendance: 30,000; Referee: Sándor Puhl (Hungary)

30 September 1999 Second leg	Dinamo București (Romania)	0–2 (2–1 agg.)	(Portugal) Benfica	Bucharest
19:00	Năstase (red card) 55'	Report	Maniche 25'; Chano 72'	Stadium: Stadionul Național; Attendance: 14,000; Referee: Alan Snoddy (Northern Ireland)

==== Second round ====
21 October 1999 First leg	PAOK (Greece)	1–2	(Portugal) Benfica	Thessaloniki
19:00	Georgiadis (red card) 55'; Frantzeskos 87'	Report	Nuno Gomes 67'; Ronaldo 90'	Stadium: Toumba Stadium; Attendance: 32,000; Referee: Dieter Schoch (Switzerland)

4 November 1999 Second leg	Benfica (Portugal)	1–2 (a.e.t.) (4–1 p)	(Greece) PAOK	Lisbon
19:00	Kandaurov 25'	Report	Spiros Marangos 28'; Sabry 44'	Stadium: Estádio da Luz; Attendance: 25,000; Referee: Roelof Luinge (Netherlands)
	Penalties
	Ronaldo (penalty scored); Maniche (penalty scored); Chano (penalty scored); Paulo Madeira (penalty scored)		Frousos (penalty missed); Machairidis (penalty missed); Banovic (penalty scored)

==== Third round ====
25 November 1999 First leg	Celta Vigo (Spain)	7–0	(Portugal) Benfica	Vigo
19:00	Karpin 16' (pen.), 54'; Makélélé 30'; Turdó 39', 50'; Juanfran 42'; Mostovoi 61'	Report		Stadium: Balaídos; Attendance: 30,000; Referee: Paul Durkin (England)

9 December 1999 Second leg	Benfica (Portugal)	1–1 (1–8 agg.)	(Spain) Celta Vigo	Lisbon
19:00	Cáceres 80' (o.g.)	Report	McCarthy 19'	Stadium: Estádio da Luz; Attendance: 6,000; Referee: Markus Merk (Germany)

=== Friendlies ===
18 July 1999	Sachsen Leipzig	1–5	Benfica	Leipzig, Germany
20:15	Lucic 77'	Report	Nuno Gomes; João Pinto; Paulo Madeira; Chano; Cadete 76'	Stadium: Alfred-Kunze-Sportpark

21 July 1999	FC Traunstein	0–6	Benfica	Traunstein, Germany
20:15		Report	Cadete 25', 43', 70'; Kandaurov 35', 68'; Tahar 40'	Stadium: Trift St

24 July 1999	VfR Aalen	1–4	Benfica	Aalen, Germany
20:15	Goal	Report	João Pinto; Paulo Madeira; Cadete 50'; Maniche 85'	Stadium: Städtisches Waldstadion; Attendance: 20,000

28 July 1999	Mainz 05	1–0	Benfica	Mainz, Germany
20:15	Sven Demandt (pen.)	Report		Stadium: Stadion am Bruchweg

30 July 1999	Karlsruher SC	0–1	Benfica	Karlsruhe, Germany
20:15		Report	Luís Carlos	Stadium: Wildparkstadion

31 July 1999	Borussia Dortmund	2–1	Benfica	Fulda, Germany
20:15	Fredi Bobic	Report	Ronaldo	Stadium: Sportpark Johannisau

6 August 1999	Benfica	0–0 (1–3 p)	Deportivo	Braga, Portugal
20:15		Report		Stadium: Estádio Primeiro de Maio; Attendance: 20,000
	Penalties
	Sérgio Nunes (penalty missed); Andrade (penalty missed); Cadete (penalty missed)		Djalminha (penalty missed)

10 August 1999	Benfica	1–2	Bayern Munich	Lisbon, Portugal
20:15	Chano 75'	Report	Èlber 65'; Zickler 88'	Stadium: Estádio da Luz; Attendance: 80,000

14 August 1999	Milan	1–2	Benfica	Trieste, Italy
20:15	Ganz 17'	Report	Kandaurov 64'; Maniche 72'	Stadium: Stadio Nereo Rocco; Attendance: 20,000

== Player statistics ==
The squad for the season consisted of the players listed in the tables below, as well as staff member Heynckes (manager).

Note 1: Note: Flags indicate national team as defined under FIFA eligibility rules. Players may hold more than one non-FIFA nationality.

Note 2: Players with squad numbers marked ‡ joined the club during the 1999-0000 season via transfer, with more details in the following section.

No.	Pos	Nat	Player	Total		Primeira Liga		Taça de Portugal		UEFA Cup	
No.	Pos	Nat	Player	Apps	Goals	Apps	Goals	Apps	Goals	Apps	Goals
1^{‡}	GK	(Argentina) ARG	Carlos Bossio	9	-14	8	-14	1	0	0	0
2	DF	(Morocco) MAR	Tahar El Khalej	5	0	4	0	1	0	0	0
3^{‡}	DF	(Portugal) POR	José Soares	3	0	1	0	1	0	1	0
4^{‡}	DF	(Nigeria) NGR	Samuel Okunowo	12	1	9	1	1	0	2	0
4	MF	(England) ENG	Michael Thomas	0	0	0	0	0	0	0	0
5	DF	(Portugal) POR	Paulo Madeira	38	1	32	1	1	0	5	0
6^{‡}	MF	(Angola) ANG	Marco Freitas	4	0	1	0	2	0	1	0
7	MF	(Czech Republic) CZE	Karel Poborský	36	5	29	5	1	0	6	0
8	MF	(Portugal) POR	João Pinto	35	3	29	3	1	0	5	0
10^{‡}	MF	(Spain) ESP	Chano	41	1	33	0	2	0	6	1
11	FW	(Portugal) POR	Jorge Cadete	5	0	3	0	1	0	1	0
12	GK	(Portugal) POR	Nuno Santos	1	0	0	0	1	0	0	0
13	DF	(Brazil) BRA	Ronaldo	33	1	27	1	1	0	5	0
14^{‡}	FW	(Spain) ESP	Tote	11	3	7	0	2	3	2	0
15	MF	(Portugal) POR	Luís Carlos	10	0	7	0	2	0	1	0
16	DF	(Portugal) POR	Jorge Ribeiro	2	0	1	0	1	0	0	0
17	MF	(Ukraine) UKR	Serhiy Kandaurov	37	7	31	6	2	0	4	1
18	FW	(Portugal) POR	Pepa	2	0	0	0	2	0	0	0
19	DF	(Portugal) POR	Bruno Basto	33	0	27	0	1	0	5	0
20^{‡}	MF	(Portugal) POR	Maniche	35	12	28	10	1	1	6	1
21	FW	(Portugal) POR	Nuno Gomes	41	20	34	18	2	1	5	1
22	MF	(Portugal) POR	José Calado	35	2	28	2	1	0	6	0
23^{‡}	DF	(Paraguay) PAR	Ricardo Rojas	30	0	23	0	2	0	5	0
24^{‡}	GK	(Germany) GER	Robert Enke	33	-34	26	-19	1	-3	6	-12
25^{‡}	MF	(Egypt) EGY	Abdel Sattar Sabry	13	5	13	5	0	0	0	0
26^{‡}	DF	(Greece) GRE	Triantafyllos Machairidis	16	0	14	0	2	0	0	0
27^{‡}	MF	(Chile) CHI	Cristián Uribe	13	4	11	1	2	3	0	0
28^{‡}	FW	(Portugal) POR	João Tomás	9	2	9	2	0	0	0	0
29^{‡}	DF	(Portugal) POR	Sérgio Nunes	22	2	17	2	1	0	4	0
30	MF	(Portugal) POR	Luís Andrade	17	0	11	0	2	0	4	0
31	GK	(Portugal) POR	José Moreira	0	0	0	0	0	0	0	0
31	DF	(Portugal) POR	Nuno Abreu	0	0	0	0	0	0	0	0
32	MF	(Portugal) POR	Hugo Porfírio	6	1	3	0	2	1	1	0
45	FW	(Angola) ANG	João Mawete	4	0	3	0	1	0	0	0
55	FW	(Cape Verde) CPV	Toy	0	0	0	0	0	0	0	0

== Transfers ==
=== In ===
Entry date	Position	Player	From club	Fee	Ref
2 June 1999	CB	José Soares	Alverca	Loan return	
2 June 1999	CM	Maniche	Alverca	Loan return	
2 June 1999	DM	Marco Freitas	Alverca	Loan return	
5 June 1999	GK	Robert Enke	Borussia Mönchengladbach	Free	
13 June 1999	FB	Ricardo Rojas	Estudiantes	Undisclosed	
13 June 1999	GK	Carlos Bossio	Estudiantes	Undisclosed	
17 June 1999	CB	Sérgio Nunes	União Leiria	Undisclosed	
18 June 1999	GK	Nuno Santos	Leeds United	Undisclosed	
6 July 1999	AM	Chano	Tenerife	Free	
13 July 1999	ST	Sigurd Rushfeldt	Rosenborg	Undisclosed	
30 December 1999	LW	Abdel Sattar Sabry	PAOK	Undisclosed	
30 December 1999	DM	Triantafyllos Machairidis	PAOK	Undisclosed	
1 February 2000	ST	João Tomás	Académica	Undisclosed	

=== In by loan ===
Date from	Position	Player	From club	Date to	Ref
22 June 1999	RB	Samuel Okunowo	Barcelona	30 June 2000	
21 August 1999	FW	Tote	Real Madrid	30 June 2000	
2 January 2000	DM	Cristián Uribe	Huachipato	30 June 2000	

=== Out ===
Exit date	Position	Player	To club	Fee	Ref
11 June 1999	GK	Paulo Lopes	Gil Vicente	Undisclosed	
17 June 1999	GK	Michel Preud'homme	None	Retired	
10 July 1999	RB	José Sousa	Alverca	Free	
12 July 1999	LW	Nandinho	Vitória Guimarães	Free	
16 July 1999	AM	Hugo Leal	Atlético Madrid	Unilateral termination	
17 July 1999	GK	Sergei Ovchinnikov	Bétis	Undisclosed	
17 July 1999	CM	Mark Pembridge	Everton	Undisclosed	
4 August 1999	ST	Dean Saunders	Bradford City	Undisclosed	
7 August 1999	RB	Gary Charles	West Ham United	Undisclosed	
13 August 1999	ST	Sigurd Rushfeldt	Rosenborg	Transfer annulled	
27 August 1999	LB	Steve Harkness	Blackburn Rovers	Undisclosed	
26 December 1999	AM	Erwin Sánchez	Boavista	Free	
9 March 2000	CB	Tahar El Khalej	Southampton	Undisclosed	

=== Out by loan ===
Date from	Position	Player	To club	Date to	Ref
4 July 1999	DM	Amaral	Vasco da Gama	30 June 2000	
2 January 2000	CB	José Soares	Campomaiorense	30 June 2000	
8 February 2000	FW	Jorge Cadete	Bradford City	30 June 2000	
13 March 2000	FW	Pepa	Lierse	30 June 2001	

== See also ==
- 1999–2000 in Portuguese football
