= 1997–98 S.L. Benfica season =

Benfica
1997–98 season
- President: Manuel Damásio (until 31 October 1997); João Vale e Azevedo
- Head coach: Manuel José (until 20 September 1997); Mário Wilson (interim until 1 November 1997); Graeme Souness
- Stadium: Estádio da Luz
- Primeira Divisão: 2nd
- Taça de Portugal: Semi-finals
- UEFA Cup: First round
- Top goalscorer: League: Nuno Gomes (18); All: Nuno Gomes (22)
- Highest home attendance: 70,000 v Braga (1 March 1998)
- Lowest home attendance: 5,000 v Varzim (21 December 1997)
- Biggest win: Benfica 7–1 Leça (17 May 1998)
- Biggest defeat: 2 goal difference in 3 matches
Home colours	Away colours	Third colours

The 1997–98 season was Sport Lisboa e Benfica's 94th season in existence and the club's 64th consecutive season in the top flight of Portuguese football, covering the period from 1 July 1997 to 30 June 1998. It involved Benfica competing in the Primeira Divisão and the Taça de Portugal. Benfica qualified for the UEFA Cup by finishing 3rd in the previous Primeira Divisão.

After three seasons without a league title, Benfica signed more than ten players in an attempt to regain competitiveness. Important signings were 21 year-old Nuno Gomes who scored 15 league goals in the past season, and together with Sánchez (also signed), were vital in denying Benfica the opportunity to retain the Portuguese Cup in the 1997 Taça de Portugal final. An addition with high expectations was Paulo Nunes, the 1996 Brasileirão top-scorer, which was meant to partner with João Pinto in the attack, but ended clashing with him. Manuel José briefly led the team, being replaced due to poor results after five games. Mário Wilson returned for a third spell of just a month, until Scottish manager Graeme Souness assumed the team in November. Although not an immediate success, changes in the squad during the winter transfer market made instant impact, with an ensuing seven-game winning streak helping the team secure a second-place finish, and benefiting from recent changes in format, qualify for the UEFA Champions League.

== Season summary ==
After a season that broke negative records, Benfica started the new one hoping to improve its previous year's performance. Manuel José continued as manager, with the opportunity to rebuild the squad in his preference. Despite many misses, new signings Nuno Gomes, Gamarra and Scott Minto jumped immediately to the starting eleven.

The season opened with a convincing home against S.C. Campomaiorense, but this impact was immediately cut short. In the first game as visitor, Benfica conceded the first loss; in the next matchday, the club had to fight not to lose at home against Académica. In the first European game, a second loss, against Bastia, which had qualified using the Intertoto Cup. A second league loss in four games led to the immediate dismissal of José, as disciplinary problems also emerged, mainly the incident involving João Pinto and a fireman after the game in Vila do Conde.

Benfica resorted to Mário Wilson for a third time in two years, until a permanent substitute was found. The experienced manager was unable to revert the one-nill deficit brought from first leg of the UEFA Cup, ending European football in September for the first time since 1990–91. The situation did not improve in the league, with a five-game win less spree, seeing the club drop to eleventh. Wilson's influence only made effect on late October, with three straight wins, one counting for the Portuguese Cup.

After a presidential change, Benfica hired Graeme Souness on 1 November. The Scottish manager had spells at Rangers, Liverpool, and had worked abroad, in Turkey and Italy, but was mostly unheard of in Portuguese football. In his first month, the helped the team climb from sixth to fourth, only three points from second place. Despite this, Benfica was still losing much needed points, entering the Clássico against Porto with an eleven-point difference. After a losing in Estádio das Antas, and with two more points lost at home, the winter signings, Poborský, Brian Deane and Luís Carlos began to impact the team performance, helping the club start a winning run, that saw them climb to second place, and beat Sporting C.P. by four-one in Alvalade in February. The only downside was the semi-final exit in the Portuguese cup, at the hands of S.C. Braga; the fourth time in history that Braga had eliminated Benfica (1966, 1979, and 1982).

In March, even though the team lost five points, the reappearance of João Pinto after an injury suffered in the Clássico gave Souness one more option to partner with Nuno Gomes. Isolated in second and with Porto clinching the title in late April, the team faced them only fighting for their honour. With a three-nil victory, the team exacted revenge from the defeat in January. The season ended with a seven-one victory over Leça; the biggest home win in the league, as Souness was certain to remain in charge.

== Competitions ==
Win Draw Loss Postponed

=== Overall record ===
Competition	First match	Last match	Record								
Competition	First match	Last match	G	W	D	L	GF	GA	GD	Win %	Source
Primeira Divisão	24 August 1997	17 May 1998	34	20	8	6	62	29	+33	58.82	
Taça de Portugal	26 October 1997	24 February 1998	6	4	1	1	11	5	+6	66.67	
UEFA Cup	16 September 1997	30 September 1997	2	0	1	1	0	1	−1	0.00	
Total			42	24	10	8	73	35	+38	57.14	

=== Primeira Divisão ===
==== League table ====
Pos	Team	Pld	W	D	L	GF	GA	GD	Pts	Qualification or relegation
1	Porto (C)	34	24	5	5	75	38	+37	77	Qualification to Champions League group stage
2	Benfica	34	20	8	6	62	29	+33	68	Qualification to Champions League second qualifying round
3	Vitória de Guimarães	34	17	8	9	42	25	+17	59	Qualification to UEFA Cup First round
4	Sporting CP	34	15	11	8	45	33	+12	56	Qualification to UEFA Cup First round
5	Marítimo	34	16	8	10	44	35	+9	56	Qualification to UEFA Cup First round

Source: Primeira Divisão
Rules for classification: 1st points, 2nd head-to-head, 3rd goals average
(C) Champions

==== Results by round ====
Round	1	2	3	4	5	6	7	8	9	10	11	12	13	14	15	16	17	18	19	20	21	22	23	24	25	26	27	28	29	30	31	32	33	34
Ground	H	A	H	A	H	A	H	A	H	A	A	H	A	H	A	H	A	A	H	AA	H	A	H	A	H	A	H	H	A	H	A	H	A	H
Result	W	L	D	L	D	D	W	W	W	D	W	D	L	W	L	D	W	W	W	W	W	W	W	D	W	W	L	W	W	W	D	W	L	W
Position	1	5	7	11	11	11	7	6	5	5	4	4	4	4	6	5	5	5	2	2	2	2	2	2	2	2	2	2	2	2	2	2	2	2

Source: ForaDeJogo
A = Away; H = Home; W = Win; D = Draw; L = Loss

==== Matches ====
24 August 1997 1	Benfica	4–0	Campomaiorense	Lisbon
20:00	Calado 2'; Paulo Nunes 13', 58'; João Pinto 80'	Report		Stadium: Estádio da Luz; Attendance: 35,000; Referee: Mario Mendes

31 August 1997 2	Vitória de Setúbal	1–0	Benfica	Porto
20:30	Vali Gasimov 11'	Report		Stadium: Estádio das Antas; Attendance: 5,000; Referee: Paulo Costa

13 September 1997 3	Benfica	1–1	Académica	Lisbon
17:00	Tahar 88'	Report	Mickey 73'	Stadium: Estádio da Luz; Attendance: 12,000; Referee: José Pratas

20 September 1997 4	Rio Ave	3–1	Benfica	Vila do Conde
20:15	Peu 5'; Nenad 36'; Marcos 39'	Report	João Pinto 89' (pen.)	Stadium: Estádio do Rio Ave FC; Attendance: 10,000; Referee: José Leirós

27 September 1997 5	Benfica	0–0	Sporting	Lisbon
20:00		Report	Oceano (yellow card) 10' (yellow-red card) 37'	Stadium: Estádio da Luz; Attendance: 25,000; Referee: Martins dos Santos

4 October 1997 6	Braga	1–1	Benfica	Braga
20:30	Toni 26'	Report	Nuno Gomes 3'; Tahar (yellow card) 34' (yellow-red card) 63'	Stadium: Estádio 1º de Maio; Attendance: 20,000; Referee: Paulo Costa

19 October 1997 7	Benfica	3–1	Farense	Lisbon
20:00	Erwin Sánchez 7'; Nuno Gomes 60'; Panduru 77' (pen.)	Report	Hassan 69'	Stadium: Estádio da Luz; Attendance: 10,000; Referee: Paulo Baptista

1 November 1997 8	Desp. Chaves	0–1	Benfica	Chaves
21:15		Report	Calado 14'	Stadium: Estádio Municipal de Chaves; Attendance: 10,000; Referee: Paulo Paraty

10 November 1997 9	Benfica	1–0	Vitória Guimarães	Lisbon
19:00	João Pinto 82'	Report	Kasongo (yellow card) 21' (yellow-red card) 40'	Stadium: Estádio da Luz; Attendance: 50,000; Referee: António Costa

21 November 1997 10	Boavista	0–0	Benfica	Porto
20:00		Report		Stadium: Estádio do Bessa; Attendance: 12,000; Referee: Isidoro Rodrigues

29 November 1997 11	Belenenses	1–2	Benfica	Lisbon
21:00	Barny 38'	Report	Edgar 76', 87'	Stadium: Estádio do Restelo; Attendance: 5,000; Referee: Vitor Pereira

7 December 1997 12	Benfica	2–2	Salgueiros	Lisbon
19:00	Edgar 11'; Panduru 43'	Report	Artur Jorge Vicente 8', 20'; Cao (yellow card) 42' (yellow-red card) 72'	Stadium: Estádio da Luz; Attendance: 70,000; Referee: Jacinto Paixão

12 December 1997 13	Maritimo	1–0	Benfica	Funchal
19:00	Bino 53'	Report		Stadium: Estádio dos Barreiros; Attendance: 7,000; Referee: Paulo Baptista

21 December 1997 14	Benfica	4–0	Varzim	Lisbon
19:00	Nuno Gomes 51', 55', 84', 88' (pen.)	Report		Stadium: Estádio da Luz; Attendance: 5,000; Referee: Paulo Paraty

3 January 1998 15	Porto	2–0	Benfica	Porto
20:30	Artur 56', 73'; Paulinho Santos (red card) 64'	Report	João Pinto (yellow card) 40' (yellow-red card) 64'	Stadium: Estádio das Antas; Attendance: 40,000; Referee: António Costa

11 January 1998 16	Benfica	2–2	Estrela da Amadora	Lisbon
18:15	Martin Pringle 28', 31'	Report	José Carlos 65'; Paulo Ferreira 85'	Stadium: Estádio da Luz; Attendance: 25,000; Referee: Mário Mendes

18 January 1998 17	Leça	1–2	Benfica	Leça da Palmeira
19:00	Zé da Rocha 51'	Report	Erwin Sánchez 38'; Kandaurov 70'	Stadium: Estádio do Leça FC; Attendance: 8,000; Referee: António Rola

24 January 1998 18	Campomaiorense	1–2	Benfica	Campo Maior, Portalegre
20:30	Jorginho 53'	Report	Erwin Sánchez 25'; Poborský 86'	Stadium: Estádio Capitão Cesar Correia; Attendance: 9,000; Referee: Paulo Paraty

1 February 1998 19	Benfica	2–0	Vitória Setúbal	Lisbon
19:30	Nuno Gomes 30', 35'	Report		Stadium: Estádio da Luz; Attendance: 20,000; Referee: José Leirós

7 February 1998 20	Académica	1–2	Benfica	Coimbra
20:30	João Tomás 44'	Report	Poborský 14'; Brian Deane 76'	Stadium: Estádio Cidade de Coimbra; Attendance: 20,000; Referee: António Costa

15 February 1998 21	Benfica	2–1	Rio Ave	Lisbon
19:00	Erwin Sánchez 33'; Nuno Gomes 57'; José Soares (yellow card) 72' (yellow-red card) 81'	Report	Nito (red card) 27'; Sérgio China (yellow card) 28' (yellow-red card) 28'; Marcos 8' (pen.) (yellow card) 58' (yellow-red card) 59'	Stadium: Estádio da Luz; Attendance: 50,000; Referee: Martins dos Santos

21 February 1998 22	Sporting	1–4	Benfica	Lisbon
21:30	Leandro Machado 66'	Report	Poborský 44'; Sousa 64'; Brian Deane 69'; João Pinto 83'	Stadium: Estádio de Alvalade; Attendance: 40,000; Referee: Isidoro Rodrigues

1 March 1998 23	Benfica	3–0	Braga	Lisbon
19:30	Tiago 19'; Tahar 69'; Brian Deane 75'	Report		Stadium: Estádio da Luz; Attendance: 70,000; Referee: Luís Miranda

8 March 1998 24	Farense	1–1	Benfica	Faro
20:30	Marco Nuno 8'	Report	Tahar 4'	Stadium: Estádio de São Luís; Attendance: 12,000; Referee: Paulo Costa

15 March 1998 25	Benfica	3–1	Desp. Chaves	Lisbon
19:30	Poborský 2'; Nuno Gomes 24' (pen.), 75'	Report	Toninho Cruz (yellow card) 28' (yellow-red card) 42'; Roberto Matute 88'	Stadium: Estádio da Luz; Attendance: 50,000; Referee: Augusto Duarte

22 March 1998 26	Vitória Guimarães	0–1	Benfica	Guimarães
19:00		Report	Erwin Sánchez 89'	Stadium: Estádio D. Afonso Henriques; Attendance: 25,000; Referee: António Costa

28 March 1998 27	Benfica	1–2	Boavista	Lisbon
20:45	Erwin Sánchez 89'	Report	Litos 28'; Jorge Couto 54'	Stadium: Estádio da Luz; Attendance: 40,000; Referee: Mário Mendes

5 April 1998 28	Benfica	2–1	Belenenses	Lisbon
19:00	Nuno Gomes 70', 75'	Report	Caetano 44'	Stadium: Estádio da Luz; Attendance: 30,000; Referee: António Marçal

11 April 1998 29	Salgueiros	0–2	Benfica	Porto
21:15		Report	João Pinto 35'; Brian Deane 85'	Stadium: Estádio Prof. Dr. José Vieira de Carvalho; Attendance: 7,000; Referee: Augusto Duarte

19 April 1998 30	Benfica	3–1	Maritimo	Lisbon
21:15	Brian Deane 30'; Ricardo Emídio Ramalho Silva 34' (o.g.); Tahar 88'	Report	Romeu Almeida 70'	Stadium: Estádio da Luz; Attendance: 10,000; Referee: José Leirós

25 April 1998 31	Varzim	0–0	Benfica	Póvoa de Varzim
19:30	Luizão (yellow card) 29' (yellow-red card) 82'	Report	Scott Minto (red card) 86'	Stadium: Estádio do Varzim; Attendance: 7,000; Referee: Mário Mendes

2 May 1998 32	Benfica	3–0	Porto	Lisbon
20:00	Brian Deane 16'; Poborský 24'; Tahar 86'	Report		Stadium: Estádio da Luz; Attendance: 50,000; Referee: José Pratas

11 May 1998 33	Estrela da Amadora	2–0	Benfica	Lisbon
20:00	Jorge Andrade 68'; Chaínho 72'	Report	Tahar (yellow card) 69' (yellow-red card) 70'	Stadium: Estádio da Reboleira; Attendance: 3,000; Referee: Paulo Paraty

17 May 1998 34	Benfica	7–1	Leça	Lisbon
17:05	João Pinto 9'; Nuno Gomes 13', 25', 67', 85', 89' (pen.); Brian Deane 68'	Report	Constantino Jardim 44' (pen.); Vladan Stojkovic (red card) 88'	Stadium: Estádio da Luz; Attendance: 5,000; Referee: Monteiro da Silva

=== Taça de Portugal ===
26 October 1997 Fourth Rd	Benfica	4–2	Farense	Lisbon
18:00	Tahar 2'; João Pinto 40'; Nuno Gomes 46', 71'	Report	Hajry 74' (pen.); Camilo 77'	Stadium: Estádio da Luz; Referee: Bento Marques

16 November 1997 Fifth Rd	Benfica	3–0	Rio Ave	Lisbon
20:30	Taument 35'; Panduru 56'; Martin Pringle 80'	Report		Stadium: Estádio da Luz; Referee: José Pratas

13 January 1998 Sixth Rd	Benfica	1–0	Beira-Mar	Lisbon
20:30	Gamarra 73'	Report		Stadium: Estádio da Luz; Referee: Lucílio Baptista

4 February 1998 Quarter-finals	Gil Vicente	1–1 (a.e.t.)	Benfica	Barcelos
20:30	Sérgio Lomba 59'	Report	Nuno Gomes 42'	Stadium: Estádio Adelino Ribeiro Novo; Referee: José Pratas

11 February 1998 QF Replay	Benfica	1–0	Gil Vicente	Lisbon
20:30	Nuno Gomes 55'	Report		Stadium: Estádio da Luz; Referee: Paulo Paraty

24 February 1998 Semi-finals	Braga	2–1	Benfica	Braga
20:30	Karoglan 32', 58'	Report	Panduru 15' (pen.)	Stadium: Estádio 1º de Maio; Referee: Bento Marques

=== UEFA Cup ===
==== First round ====
16 September 1997 First leg	Bastia (France)	1–0	(Portugal) Benfica	Bastia
19:00	André 80'	Report		Stadium: Stade Armand Cesari; Attendance: 10,080; Referee: Pierluigi Pairetto (Italy)

30 September 1997 Second leg	Benfica (Portugal)	0–0 (0–1 agg.)	(France) Bastia	Lisbon
19:00		Report		Stadium: Estádio da Luz; Attendance: 20,000; Referee: László Vágner (Hungary)

=== Friendlies ===
20 July 1997	Alphense	0–8	Benfica	Alphen aan den Rijn
				Stadium: Sportpark

22 July 1997	RKSV Taxandria	0–7	Benfica	Oisterwijk
				Stadium: Gemullehoek

23 July 1997	Den Bosch	0–1	Benfica	's-Hertogenbosch
				Stadium: De Vliert

26 July 1997	Standard Liège	3–1	Benfica	Oisterwijk

27 July 1997	RKSV Halsteren	0–5	Benfica	Halsteren
				Stadium: Beek

3 August 1997 Centenary Belo Horizonte	Cruzeiro	4–1	Benfica	Belo Horizonte
	Roberto Gaúcho; Geovanni; Fábio Júnior		Paulo Nunes	Stadium: Mineirão; Attendance: 4,891; Referee: Cléver Gonçalves

5 August 1997 Centenary Belo Horizonte	Flamengo	5–2	Benfica	Belo Horizonte
	Sávio 9' (pen.); Iranildo; Lúcio; Rodrigo Mendes; Fábio Baiano		Erwin Sánchez; Paulo Nunes	Stadium: Mineirão; Attendance: 2,786; Referee: Raimundo Menezes de Carvalho

7 August 1997 Centenary Belo Horizonte	Benfica	0–0	Olimpia	Belo Horizonte
				Stadium: Mineirão; Attendance: 3,088; Referee: Márcio Rezende de Freitas

12 August 1997	Benfica	0–1	Lazio	Lisbon
20:30			43' Mancini	Stadium: Estádio da Luz; Referee: Jorge Coroado

== Player statistics ==
The squad for the season consisted of the players listed in the tables below, as well as staff member Manuel José (manager), Mário Wilson (manager) and Graeme Souness (manager).

Note 1: Note: Flags indicate national team as defined under FIFA eligibility rules. Players may hold more than one non-FIFA nationality.

Note 2: Players with squad numbers marked ‡ joined the club during the 1997-98 season via transfer, with more details in the following section.

No.	Pos	Nat	Player	Total		Primeira Divisão		Taça de Portugal		UEFA Cup	
No.	Pos	Nat	Player	Apps	Goals	Apps	Goals	Apps	Goals	Apps	Goals
1	GK	(Belgium) BEL	Michel Preud'homme	33	-26	28	-22	4	-4	1	0
2	DF	(Morocco) MAR	Tahar El Khalej	25	6	21	5	2	1	2	0
3	DF	(Portugal) POR	Jorge Soares	6	0	5	0	0	0	1	0
5^{‡}	DF	(Portugal) POR	Paulo Madeira	26	0	22	0	4	0	0	0
6	MF	(Portugal) POR	Tiago Pereira	24	1	21	1	1	0	2	0
7^{‡}	FW	(Brazil) BRA	Paulo Nunes	8	2	5	2	1	0	2	0
8	MF	(Portugal) POR	João Pinto	30	7	25	6	3	1	2	0
9	MF	(Romania) ROU	Basarab Panduru	20	4	15	2	5	2	0	0
10^{‡}	MF	(Bolivia) BOL	Erwin Sánchez	30	6	26	6	3	0	1	0
11	FW	(Sweden) SWE	Martin Pringle	19	3	14	2	3	1	2	0
12^{‡}	GK	(Russia) RUS	Sergei Ovchinnikov	9	-9	6	-7	2	-1	1	-1
13	DF	(Brazil) BRA	Ronaldo Guiaro	35	0	27	0	6	0	2	0
14^{‡}	MF	(Brazil) BRA	Leônidas	5	0	4	0	0	0	1	0
15^{‡}	MF	(Brazil) BRA	Amaral	5	0	5	0	0	0	0	0
16^{‡}	DF	(England) ENG	Scott Minto	25	0	21	0	4	0	0	0
17^{‡}	MF	(Netherlands) NED	Gaston Taument	20	1	16	0	2	1	2	0
18	DF	(Morocco) MAR	Abdelkrim El Hadrioui	21	0	17	0	2	0	2	0
19	MF	(Portugal) POR	Bruno Caires	1	0	1	0	0	0	0	0
20^{‡}	MF	(Portugal) POR	Jordão	8	0	6	0	1	0	1	0
21^{‡}	FW	(Portugal) POR	Nuno Gomes	40	22	33	18	6	4	1	0
22	MF	(Portugal) POR	José Calado	37	2	29	2	6	0	2	0
23	MF	(Portugal) POR	Edgar Pacheco	13	3	12	3	1	0	0	0
24	GK	(Portugal) POR	Paulo Lopes	0	0	0	0	0	0	0	0
25^{‡}	MF	(Czech Republic) CZE	Karel Poborský	23	5	19	5	4	0	0	0
26^{‡}	MF	(Portugal) POR	Luís Carlos	23	1	19	1	4	0	0	0
27^{‡}	MF	(Ukraine) UKR	Serhiy Kandaurov	9	1	7	1	2	0	0	0
28^{‡}	FW	(England) ENG	Brian Deane	17	7	14	7	3	0	0	0
32^{‡}	DF	(Paraguay) PAR	Carlos Gamarra	17	1	13	0	2	1	2	0
34^{‡}	FW	(Brazil) BRA	Duda	0	0	0	0	0	0	0	0
36^{‡}	DF	(Portugal) POR	Sousa	30	1	25	1	5	0	0	0
37	MF	(Portugal) POR	Hugo Leal	4	0	4	0	0	0	0	0
38^{‡}	DF	(Portugal) POR	José Soares	5	0	3	0	2	0	0	0
39^{‡}	DF	(Portugal) POR	Bruno Basto	3	0	3	0	0	0	0	0

== Transfers ==
=== In ===
Entry date	Position	Player	From club
July 1997	ST	Nuno Gomes	Boavista
July 1997	AM	Erwin Sánchez	Boavista
July 1997	CB	Paulo Madeira	Belenenses
July 1997	CB	Carlos Gamarra	Internacional
July 1997	GK	Ovchinnikov	Lokomotiv Moscow
July 1997	CM	Jordão	Estrela Amadora
July 1997	RW	Gaston Taument	Feyenoord
July 1997	LB	Scott Minto	Chelsea
July 1997	FW	Paulo Nunes	Grêmio
July 1997	LW	Leônidas	Corinthians Alagoano
July 1997	AM	Deco	Corinthians Alagoano
July 1997	RW	Duda	Corinthians Alagoano
August 1997	RB	Sousa	Alverca
December 1997	DM	Amaral	Parma
December 1997	LW	Luís Carlos	Salgueiros
December 1997	ST	Brian Deane	Sheffield United
December 1997	CM	Serhiy Kandaurov	Maccabi Haifa
28 December 1997	RW	Karel Poborský	Manchester United
January 1998	CB	José Soares	Alverca
January 1998	LB	Bruno Basto	Alverca

=== Out ===
Exit date	Position	Player	To club
July 1997	GK	Fernando Brassard	Varzim
July 1997	CB	Paredão	Sheffield Wednesday
July 1997	CB	Bermúdez	Boca Juniors
July 1997	RB	Marinho	Campomaiorense
July 1997	LB	Pedro Henriques	Porto
July 1997	LB	Lúcio Wagner	Sevilla
July 1997	DM	Amaral	Parma
July 1997	CM	Luís Gustavo	Cruzeiro
July 1997	FB	Nélson Morais	Alverca
July 1997	AM	Valdo Filho	Nagoya Grampus
July 1997	CM	Paulão	Académica
July 1997	AM	Iliev	Slavia Sofia
July 1997	ST	Hassan Nader	Farense
July 1997	FW	Mauro Airez	Estrela da Amadora
July 1997	ST	Valdir	Atlético Mineiro
July 1997	FW	Akwá	Académica
July 1997	RW	Glenn Helder	Arsenal
August 1997	DM	Bruno Caires	Celta de Vigo
January 1998	FW	Paulo Nunes	Palmeiras
January 1998	CB	Carlos Gamarra	Corinthians
January 1998	RW	Gaston Taument	Anderlecht
January 1998	CM	Jordão	Braga
January 1998	LW	Leônidas	Arsenal Tula

=== Out by loan ===
Exit date	Position	Player	To club	Return date
July 1997	DM	Jamir	Flamengo	30 June 1998
July 1997	AM	Deco	Alverca	30 June 1998
