= Ricardo Ferreira =

Ricardo Ferreira is the name of:

- Ricardo Berna (born 1979), Brazilian football goalkeeper nicknamed Ricardo Berna
- Ricardo (footballer, born 1980), Cape Verdean football defender nicknamed Ricardo
- Cadú (footballer, born 1981), Portuguese football defender nicknamed Cadú
- Ricardo Ferreira (footballer, born 1982), Portuguese football defender
- Ricardinho (footballer, born September 1984), Brazilian football defender nicknamed Ricardinho
- Ricardo Ferreira (footballer, born 1989), Portuguese football goalkeeper nicknamed Ricardo
- Ricardo Ferreira (soccer, born 1992), Portuguese-Canadian soccer defender
