= Mões =

- Civil parish
- Location in Portugal
- Coordinates: 40.868°N 7.886°W
- Country: Portugal
- Region: Centro
- Intermunic. comm.: Viseu Dão Lafões
- District: Viseu
- Municipality: Castro Daire

Area
  - Total: 44.15 km^{2} (17.05 sq mi)

Population (2011)
  - Total: 1,837
  - Density: 42/km^{2} (110/sq mi)
- Time zone: UTC+00:00 (WET)
  - Summer (DST): UTC+01:00 (WEST)

Mões is a civil parish in the municipality of Castro Daire, Portugal. The population in 2011 was 1,837, in an area of 44.15 km^{2}.
