= Almofala =

- Civil parish
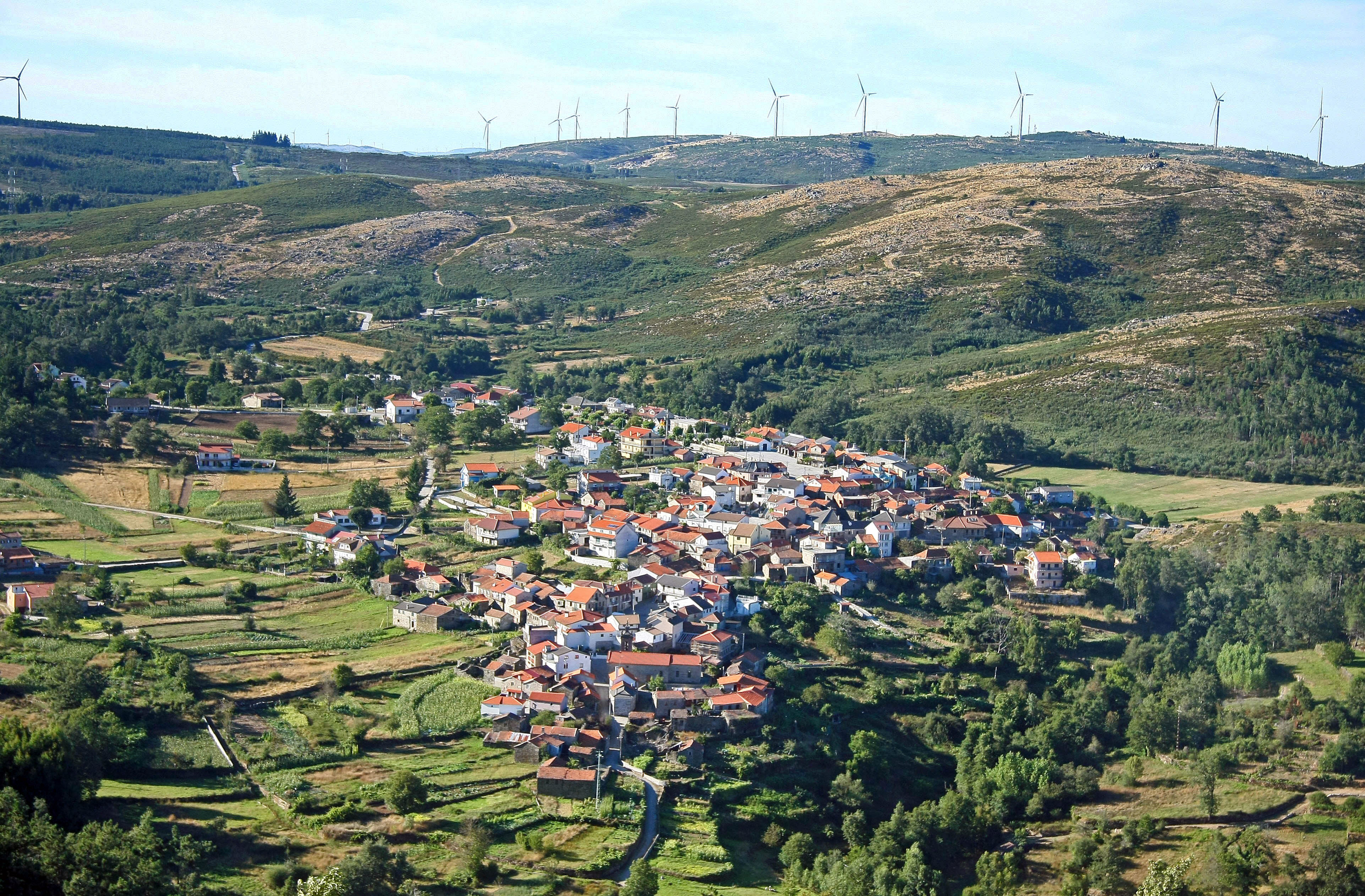

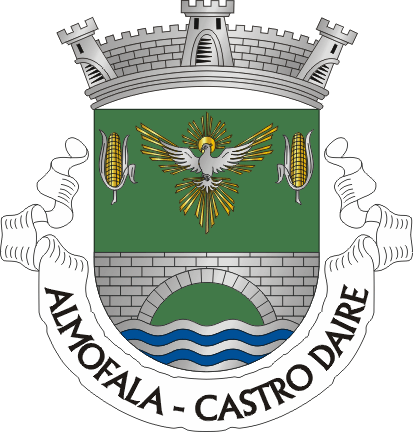
- Coat of arms

- Location in Portugal
- Coordinates: 40.953°N 7.793°W
- Country: Portugal
- Region: Centro
- Intermunic. comm.: Viseu Dão Lafões
- District: Viseu
- Municipality: Castro Daire

Area
  - Total: 18.60 km^{2} (7.18 sq mi)

Population (2011)
  - Total: 228
  - Density: 12.3/km^{2} (31.7/sq mi)
- Time zone: UTC+00:00 (WET)
  - Summer (DST): UTC+01:00 (WEST)
- Website: http://www.almofala-castrodaire.com

Almofala is a civil parish in the municipality of Castro Daire, Portugal. The population in 2011 was 228, in an area of 18.60 km^{2}.

== Demographics ==
Population of Almofala (1801–2004)
1911	1920	1930	1940	1950	1960	1970	1981	1991	2001	2011
500	515	550	585	728	714	685	547	367	279	228
