= Luís Carlos (footballer, born 1972) =

Portuguese footballer

Personal information
- Full name: Luís Carlos da Silva Marques
- Date of birth: 21 August 1972 (age 54)
- Place of birth: Castro Daire, Portugal
- Height: 1.77 m (5 ft 10 in)
- Position: Winger

Youth career
- 1985–1991: Oriental

Senior career*
Years	Team	Apps	(Gls)
1991–1996	Oriental		
1996–1997	Nacional	30	(4)
1997	Salgueiros	10	(1)
1998–2000	Benfica	45	(1)
2000–2001	Estrela Amadora	12	(0)
2001–2002	Atlético	35	(4)
2002–2004	Estoril	38	(1)
2004–2007	Beira-Mar Monte Gordo		

International career
1998	Portugal	1	(0)
- * Club domestic league appearances and goals

Luís Carlos da Silva Marques (born 21 August 1972), known as Luís Carlos, is a Portuguese former footballer who played as a left winger.

== Club career ==
Born in Castro Daire, Viseu District, Luís Carlos joined Clube Oriental de Lisboa's youth system in 1985, going on to compete with the club as a senior in the lower leagues. In 1996, he signed with C.D. Nacional, helping his team achieve promotion from the third division.

Luís Carlos moved straight to the Primeira Liga in the 1997 summer, when he joined S.C. Salgueiros. In the following transfer window, after solid performances, he moved to S.L. Benfica. He made his debut on 3 January 1998 against FC Porto, and was a starter for the Graeme Souness-led side in his first season.

Subsequently, Luís Carlos was only a fringe player for Benfica, first losing his place to Hugo Leal then being completely sidelined by Jupp Heynckes in the 1999–2000 campaign. After being subjected to disciplinary procedures due to comments he made regarding the latter's releasing of João Vieira Pinto, referring to him as "not much of a man", Benfica sent him on a permanent deal to C.F. Estrela da Amadora together with Jorge Cadete, as Miguel moved in the opposite direction.

After suffering relegation from the top flight at the end of the season, Luís Carlos returned to the third level, first with Atlético Clube de Portugal then G.D. Estoril-Praia, helping the latter club promote to the second tier in 2003. He retired in 2007 at the age of 35, after three years in amateur football with Grupo Desportivo Beira-Mar.

== International career ==
During his tenure with Benfica, Luís Carlos earned one cap for Portugal, playing the second half of a 2–1 friendly win with Mozambique in Ponta Delgada on 19 August 1998.
