= Abdelkrim El Hadrioui =

Moroccan footballer (born 1972)

Personal information
- Date of birth: 6 March 1972 (age 54)
- Place of birth: Taza, Morocco
- Height: 1.79 m (5 ft 10 in)
- Position: Left-back

Youth career
- A.S.T de Taza

Senior career*
Years	Team	Apps	(Gls)
1989–1996	AS.FAR	143	(7)
1997–1998	Benfica	22	(0)
1998–2002	AZ Alkmaar	87	(2)
2002–2004	Charleroi	59	(3)
2004–2005	Ittihad Khemisset	19	(0)
Total		330	(12)

International career
1992–2001	Morocco	72	(4)
- * Club domestic league appearances and goals

Abdelkrim El Hadrioui (Arabic: عبد الكريم الحضريوي; born 6 March 1972) is a Moroccan former professional footballer who played as a left-back.

== Career ==
Born in Taza, Hadrioui began his career at AS.FAR, helping them win one league title. In January 1997, after the sale of Dimas to Juventus, Mário Wilson, who managed AS.FAR a year before, recommend him to Benfica, who subsequently signed him. He made his league debut on 1 March 1997 in a 3–1 loss against Chaves and quickly took the starting role from Pedro Henriques. He scored his first and only goal for Benfica on the 1997 Taça de Portugal Final lost to Boavista. After the arrival of Scott Minto and Graeme Souness, his influence was greatly reduced, only appearing sporadically throughout his second year, but still bagged 20 matches, for a total for 28 appearances for Benfica.

In 1998, he moved to AZ Alkmaar, becoming an undisputed starter, and even attracting attention of other clubs, such as Celtic in August 2000. After four seasons at Alkmaar, El Hadrioui moved to Belgian, playing for two years with Charleroi, retiring in 2005 at the age of 33 years after a one-year spell with Ittihad Khemisset.

Internationally, he was a member of the Morocco national team that competed at the 1994 FIFA World Cup in the United States and 1998 FIFA World Cup in France. He also participated at the 1992 Summer Olympics.

== Career statistics ==
=== International goals ===
#	Date	Venue	Opponent	Score	Result	Competition
1.	6 February 1994	Sharjah Stadium, Sharjah, United Arab Emirates	Slovakia	1–2	Win	Friendly
2.	23 March 1994	Stade Josy Barthel, Luxembourg City, Luxembourg	Luxembourg	1–2	Win	Friendly
3.	20 March 1996	Al-Maktoum Stadium, Dubai, United Arab Emirates	Egypt	0–2	Win	Friendly
4.	31 May 1997	Prince Moulay Stadium, Rabat, Morocco	Ethiopia	4–0	Win	1998 African Cup of Nations qual.
Correct as of 7 October 2015
