= Castro Daire =

- Municipality
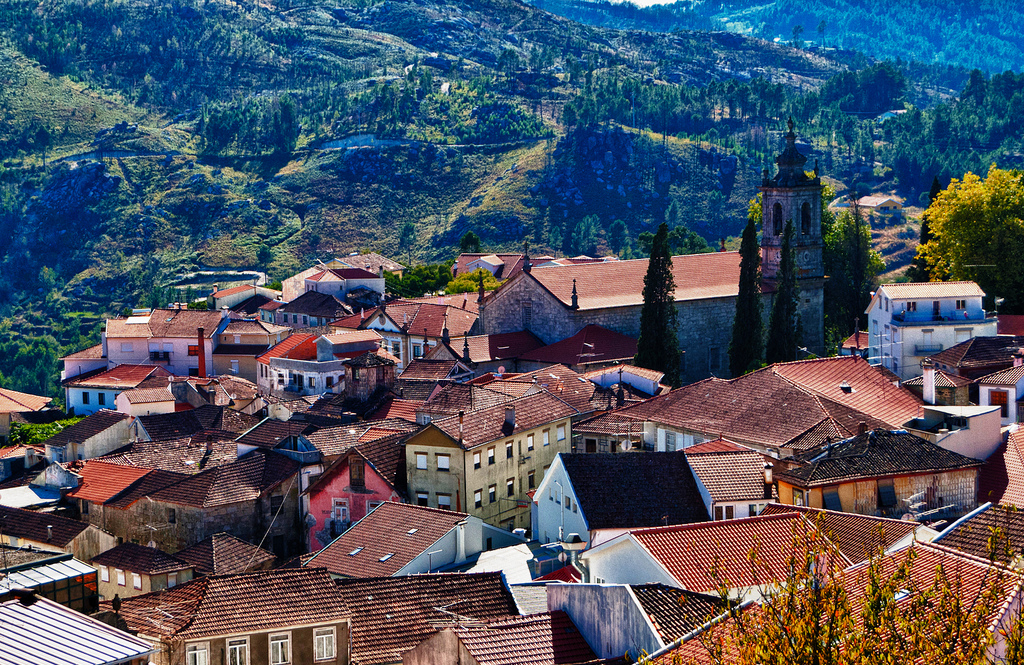
- Partial view of Castro Daire

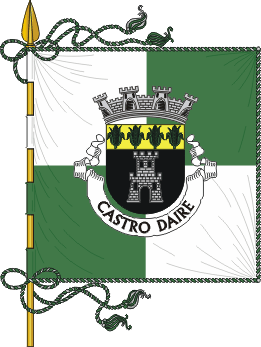
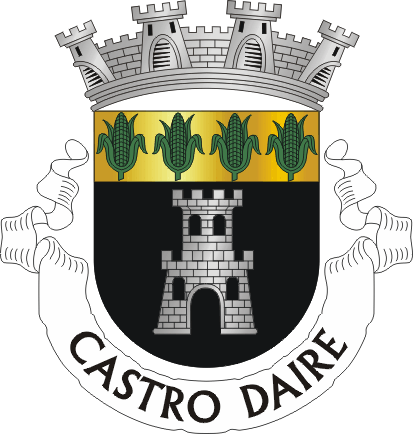
- Flag Coat of arms
- Interactive map of Castro Daire
- Location in Portugal
- Coordinates: 40°54′N 7°56′W
- Country: Portugal
- Region: Centro
- Intermunic. comm.: Viseu Dão Lafões
- District: Viseu
- Parishes: 16

Government
  - President: Manuel Pertencho (PS)

Area
  - Total: 379.04 km^{2} (146.35 sq mi)

Population (2011)
  - Total: 15,339
  - Density: 40.468/km^{2} (104.81/sq mi)
- Time zone: UTC+00:00 (WET)
  - Summer (DST): UTC+01:00 (WEST)
- Local holiday: Saint Peter; June 29
- Website: www.cm-castrodaire.pt

Castro Daire (European Portuguese pronunciation: [ˈkaʃtɾu ˈðajɾɨ]) is a municipality in Viseu District in Portugal. The population in 2011 was 15,339, in an area of 379.04 km^{2}.

The present mayor is Paulo Almeida, elected by a coalition CDS-PP, PSD. The municipal holiday is June 29 (St Peter's Day).

== Climate ==
Climate data for Castro Daire (Lamelas de Lá), altitude: 584 m (1,916 ft)
Month	Jan	Feb	Mar	Apr	May	Jun	Jul	Aug	Sep	Oct	Nov	Dec	Year
Average precipitation mm (inches)	237 (9.3)	213 (8.4)	162 (6.4)	124 (4.9)	124 (4.9)	59 (2.3)	19 (0.7)	23 (0.9)	72 (2.8)	160 (6.3)	203 (8.0)	232 (9.1)	1,628 (64)
Source: Portuguese Environment Agency

== Demographics ==
Population of Castro Daire Municipality (1801–2011)
1801	1849	1900	1930	1960	1981	1991	2001	2011
2504	9603	21274	24076	25031	20411	18156	16990	15339

== Parishes ==
Administratively, the municipality is divided into 12 civil parishes (freguesias):

- Almofala
- Cabril
- Castro Daire
- Cujó
- Gosende
- Mamouros, Alva e Ribolhos
- Mezio e Moura Morta
- Mões
- Moledo
- Monteiras
- Parada de Ester e Ester
- Pepim
- Picão e Ermida
- Pinheiro
- Reriz e Gafanhão
- São Joaninho

== Notable people ==
- Isaac Aboab da Fonseca (1605–1693) a rabbi, scholar, kabbalist and writer.

=== Sport ===
- Vítor Manuel da Silva Marques (born 1969), known as Vitinha a futsal player and captain of the Portugal national futsal team
- Luís Carlos (born 1972) a former footballer with 140 club caps
- Ricardo Ferreira (born 1982) a footballer with 124 caps with Académico de Viseu
- Luís Carlos Pereira Carneiro (born 1988), known as Licá, a footballer with over 330 club caps
