= Cristián Uribe =

Chilean footballer (born 1976)

Personal information
- Full name: Cristián Roberto Uribe Lara
- Date of birth: 1 August 1976 (age 50)
- Place of birth: Concepción, Chile
- Height: 1.82 m (6 ft 0 in)
- Position: Midfielder

Youth career
- 1991–1994: Huachipato

Senior career*
Years	Team	Apps	(Gls)
1994–2000	Huachipato	65	(11)
1999	→ Colo-Colo (loan)	31	(1)
1999–2000	→ Benfica (loan)	11	(1)
2000–2001	Benfica	4	(0)
2001	→ Huachipato (loan)	21	(1)
2002	Portuguesa	0	(0)
2002	Huachipato	14	(0)
2003–2004	Moreirense	10	(0)
2004	Deportes La Serena	12	(1)
2005	Deportes Concepción	35	(4)
2006–2009	Everton	113	(24)
2010	Rangers	12	(0)
2010	San Luis	10	(0)
Total		338	(43)

International career
1995	Chile U20	5	(0)
1999	Chile	2	(0)

Managerial career
- Everton (youth)
- 2016: Everton (caretaker)
- * Club domestic league appearances and goals

Cristián Roberto Uribe Lara (Spanish pronunciation: [kɾisˈtjan uˈɾiβe ˈlaɾa], born 1 August 1976) is a Chilean former professional footballer who played as a midfielder.

Uribe was mainly associated with Huachipato and Everton de Viña del Mar, but represented other clubs, amongst them, Colo-Colo and Benfica. He also earned seven caps for Chile, five of those for the under–17 side at the 1995 FIFA World Youth Championship in the United Arab Emirates.

== Club career ==
=== Early career and Benfica ===
Born in Concepción, Chile, Uribe began at Huachipato, receiving his first promotion for the first team in 1994, at the age of 18. He established himself as a first team player after good performances in the 1995 FIFA World Youth Championship. In 1999, the 22-year old was loaned for Colo-Colo but did not have a good individual season, as Colo-Colo was going through difficult times, finishing in fourth in the league and having three managers in one season. In January, he went on a second loan deal, but now to Benfica of the Portuguese Liga.

He made his debut on 9 January in a Lisbon derby against Sporting CP. Three days later he scored a double against Amora in the Taça de Portugal and added another on 25th, in a 3–1 loss to Sporting in the same competition. Uribe played 13 games in half a season, with four goals netted. In the following year, his playing time under José Mourinho was vastly reduced, so he mutually terminated his loan deal in January 2001.

=== Huachipato and later career ===
Back at Huachipato, on 3 March 2001, Uribe made his season debut against Santiago Morning in a Primera División game at Estadio Las Higueras. His only goal came against Unión San Felipe on 6 July and he appeared in 24 games in the tournament. While he lacked goals, Fido Dido was an important player in the club and he extended his contract in 2002, and continued in Talcahuano club until 2003, with a brief stint with Portuguesa in 2002, only leaving at the end the season for Portuguese club Moreirense of the second tier. He made his debut for them on 24 August 2003, against Paços de Ferreira.

After the second spell in Portugal, Uribe returned to Chile in 2004 and represented Deportes La Serena and Concepción in successive years. He joined Everton de Viña del Mar in 2006 and played for them until 2009, when he was released following the club elimination on the 2009 Torneo Clausura Playoffs against Universidad Católica. He finished his career in the following year, after playing for Rangers in the Primera B and San Luis de Quillota of the Primera División, being relegated with the latter.

== Honours ==
Everton de Viña del Mar

- Primera División de Chile: 2008 Apertura
