= Nuno Santos (footballer, born 1973) =

Portuguese footballer

Personal information
- Full name: Nuno Luís da Costa Santos
- Date of birth: 20 April 1973 (age 53)
- Place of birth: Setúbal, Portugal
- Height: 1.85 m (6 ft 1 in)
- Position: Goalkeeper

Youth career
- 1984–1985: OVNI 2001
- 1985–1991: Vitória Setúbal

Senior career*
Years	Team	Apps	(Gls)
1991–1998	Vitória Setúbal	42	(0)
1991–1992	→ Caldas (loan)	13	(0)
1993–1994	→ Operário (loan)		
1998–1999	Leeds United	0	(0)
1999–2004	Benfica	0	(0)
2000	→ Badajoz (loan)	0	(0)
2001	→ Santa Clara (loan)	7	(0)
2001–2002	→ Beira-Mar (loan)	24	(0)
2003–2004	→ Vitória Setúbal (loan)	13	(0)
2004–2007	Santa Clara	69	(0)
2007	Raging Rhinos	2	(0)
2008	Toronto FC	0	(0)
2008–2009	Gondomar	19	(0)
2009–2010	Arouca	9	(0)
2010–2012	Ethnikos Assia	10	(0)
Total		208	(0)
- * Club domestic league appearances and goals

Nuno Luís da Costa Santos (born 20 April 1973) is a Portuguese football coach and former professional player who played as a goalkeeper.

== Playing career ==
Born in Setúbal, Santos made his professional debut with his hometown club Vitória FC, also serving two loans with lowly teams (Caldas and Operário). His performances in the 1997–98 campaign attracted the attention of Leeds United, but he made no official appearances whatsoever for the Premier League side, returning to his country with Benfica.

During his stint in Lisbon, Santos was almost always only third choice, and went on to also serve several loans, including in Spain's Badajoz, playing no games in the Segunda División during his four-month spell. Released by Benfica in June 2004 following a season-long loan spell at Vitória, he stabilised at Santa Clara – which he had already represented on loan from Benfica – starting in two of his three campaigns in the Azores.

After one year in North America, appearing for both the Rochester Raging Rhinos and Toronto FC, Santos returned to Portugal and played in slightly more than half of the league's matches for Gondomar, with the club, also in the Segunda Liga, being relegated. In the summer, he dropped down to the third tier and joined Arouca.

== Coaching career ==
Upon retiring at the age of 39, Santos worked as goalkeeper coach of the Canada national team. In 2018, in the same capacity, he signed with Lille of the French Ligue 1.

Santos moved to English club Tottenham Hotspur in November 2019, still in that role. After the dismissal of manager José Mourinho on 19 April 2021, the entire coaching staff was relieved of their duties. On 7 April 2022, while working as goalkeeping coach of Roma, he was involved in an altercation with the head coach of Bodø/Glimt, following a UEFA Europa Conference League quarter-final match.

Subsequently, Santos acted as goalkeeper coach at Benfica, under both Bruno Lage and his successor Mourinho. He then followed Mourinho to Real Madrid.
