= Dino (footballer, born 1978) =

Portuguese footballer

Personal information
- Full name: Dino Gonçalo Castro Jorge
- Date of birth: 7 February 1978 (age 48)
- Place of birth: Lisbon, Portugal
- Height: 1.85 m (6 ft 1 in)
- Position: Defender

Youth career
- 1991–1996: Atlético CP

Senior career*
Years	Team	Apps	(Gls)
1996	Atlético CP	18	(0)
1997–1998	Zamora	20	(0)
1998–1999	Salamanca	1	(0)
1999–2000	Farense	14	(0)
2000–2001	Maia	11	(20)
2001–2002	Académica	14	(2)
2003	União de Lamas	13	(0)
2003–2004	Pombal	29	(2)
2004	Amora	10	(0)
2004–2006	Olivais e Moscavide	27	(0)
2006–2007	Estrela Vendas Novas	0	(0)
2008–2011	Villaralbo		
2011–2014	Íscar		
- * Club domestic league appearances and goals

Dino Gonçalo Castro Jorge (born 7 February 1978), shortened to Dino is a retired Portuguese football defender.
