= Ricardo Ferreira (footballer, born 1982) =

Portuguese footballer

Personal information
- Full name: Ricardo Miguel Ribeiro Ferreira
- Date of birth: 20 March 1982 (age 44)
- Place of birth: Castro Daire, Portugal
- Height: 1.73 m (5 ft 8 in)
- Position: Defender

Youth career
- 1995–1998: Castro Daire
- 1998–2001: Boavista

Senior career*
Years	Team	Apps	(Gls)
2001–2002	Ermesinde		
2002–2006	Social Lamas		
2006–2007	Marítimo B		
2007	Camacha		
2008–2009	Machico		
2008–2009	→ Tondela (loan)	4	(0)
2009–2010	Tondela	2	(0)
2010–2017	Académico de Viseu	125	(8)
- * Club domestic league appearances and goals as of 2 April 2017

Ricardo Miguel Ribeiro Ferreira (born 20 March 1982) is a Portuguese former football player.

== Club career ==
He made his professional debut in the Segunda Liga for Académico de Viseu on 22 December 2013 in a game against Moreirense.
