= Sérgio Nunes =

Portuguese footballer

Personal information
- Full name: Sérgio Manuel Ferreira Nunes
- Date of birth: 21 July 1974 (age 52)
- Place of birth: Matosinhos, Portugal
- Height: 1.82 m (6 ft 0 in)
- Position: Centre back

Youth career
- 1984–1992: Leixões

Senior career*
Years	Team	Apps	(Gls)
1992–1994	Leixões	49	(1)
1994–1997	Aves	69	(3)
1997–1999	União Leiria	56	(4)
1999–2001	Benfica	20	(2)
2001–2004	Santa Clara	61	(2)
2004−2010	Aves	159	(10)
2010−2012	Freamunde	52	(1)
Total		465	(23)

International career
1993	Portugal U21	3	(0)
- * Club domestic league appearances and goals

Sérgio Manuel Ferreira Nunes (born 21 July 1974) is a Portuguese retired footballer who played as a central defender.

He amassed Segunda Liga totals of 335 games and 18 goals over 14 seasons, appearing mainly for Aves (eight years). He added 131/5 in the Primeira Liga.

== Club career ==
Born in Matosinhos, Nunes spent eight years in local Leixões SC's youth system. He made his debut as a senior for the club in the Segunda Liga, going on to represent in the competition C.D. Aves and U.D. Leiria and helping the latter team promote to the Primeira Liga in 1998.

Nunes played his first game in the top division on 23 August 1998, featuring the full 90 minutes in a 1–0 home win against C.S. Marítimo. He was subsequently signed by S.L. Benfica on 17 June 1999, but only made 27 appearances all competitions comprised in his two years in Lisbon, serving mainly as back-up to Paulo Madeira and Ronaldo.

On 4 August 2001, Nunes moved to C.D. Santa Clara, being relegated from the top flight in his second season. After leaving the Azores he spent a further five campaigns in the second tier, with Aves – with the addition of 2006–07 in the former competition – and S.C. Freamunde, retiring at the age of 37.
