= José Sousa =

Portuguese football manager and former player

Personal information
- Full name: José Carlos Leite de Sousa
- Date of birth: 9 October 1977 (age 49)
- Place of birth: São João da Madeira, Portugal
- Height: 1.80 m (5 ft 11 in)
- Position: Right-back

Youth career
- 1989–1993: Sanjoanense
- 1993–1996: Benfica

Senior career*
Years	Team	Apps	(Gls)
1996–1999	Benfica	35	(1)
1996–1997	→ Alverca (loan)	34	(1)
1999–2000	Alverca	24	(0)
2000–2003	Porto	0	(0)
2000–2001	→ Braga (loan)	18	(0)
2002	→ Farense (loan)	8	(0)
2002–2003	→ Belenenses (loan)	15	(0)
2003–2007	Belenenses	59	(3)
2008	Olympiakos Nicosia	3	(0)
2008–2009	Beira-Mar	20	(1)
2009–2010	Arouca	18	(0)
Total		234	(6)

International career
1993	Portugal U15	2	(0)
1996–1998	Portugal U20	6	(0)
1998–1999	Portugal U21	8	(1)
2000	Portugal B	2	(0)

Managerial career
- 2013–2016: Belenenses (youth)
- 2016: Vilafranquense
- 2017–2020: Alenquer e Benfica (youth)
- 2023–2024: Belenenses (youth)
- 2024–2025: Belenenses
- * Club domestic league appearances and goals

José Carlos Leite de Sousa (born 9 October 1977) is a Portuguese former professional footballer who played as a right-back, currently a manager.

He totalled 159 matches and four goals in the Primeira Liga over ten seasons, representing mainly in the competition Belenenses (five years).

== Club career ==
Born in São João da Madeira, Sousa started playing with his local club A.D. Sanjoanense. In 1993, he joined the youth ranks of S.L. Benfica, from where he was loaned to F.C. Alverca who acted as the farm team.

After a successful debut season with the Ribatejo Province side, the 20-year-old Sousa was recalled by Benfica manager Manuel José in August 1997, due to a good performance in a Segunda Liga match against F.C. Paços de Ferreira. Dubbed the new António Veloso by the press, he made his Primeira Liga debut for the latter on 13 September 1997 in a home draw against Académica de Coimbra, becoming a regular starter and scoring his only goal for them in a 4–1 win over Sporting CP at the Estádio José Alvalade; Graeme Souness brought in Gary Charles midway through the 1998–99 campaign, and his playing time was subsequently vastly reduced.

Sousa signed a permanent deal with Alverca in summer 1999, staying only one year before agreeing to a five-year contract at FC Porto on 5 August 2000. He was consecutively loaned during his tenure at the Estádio das Antas, however.

On 21 August 2002, Sousa joined C.F. Os Belenenses on a one-year loan, moving on a permanent basis ahead of the following season and always representing the Lisbon-based side in the top flight. Afterwards, he joined Olympiakos Nicosia from Cyprus, ending his career in 2010 aged 32 after one season with F.C. Arouca in the third division.

In June 2016, following a spell at Belenenses as youth coach, Sousa was appointed manager of third tier team U.D. Vilafranquense. He later worked with Sport Alenquer e Benfica and Belenenses again at the same level.

Sousa returned to Belenenses on 30 May 2024, now as manager of the first team and following the club's relegation to the Liga 3. He led them to the promotion phase, but also managed to collect only one win in 12 games, being dismissed in January 2025.

== International career ==
Sousa earned 18 caps for Portugal all youth levels comprised. He made his debut for the under-21 team on 5 September 1998, playing the first half of a 3–0 away win against Hungary for the 2000 UEFA European Championship qualifiers.

== Personal life ==
Sousa's son, Bruno Leite, was also a footballer. He spent most of his career in Norway.

Sousa's uncle António Sousa and his cousin Ricardo were also involved in the sport, as midfielders and managers; the former represented Sanjoanense and Porto as well, also being a longtime Portuguese international.
