= José Soares =

Portuguese footballer (born 1976)

Personal information
- Full name: José Feliciano Loureiro Soares
- Date of birth: 23 February 1976 (age 50)
- Place of birth: Elvas, Portugal
- Height: 1.85 m (6 ft 1 in)
- Position: Centre back

Youth career
- 1986–1990: O Elvas
- 1990–1994: Benfica

Senior career*
Years	Team	Apps	(Gls)
1994–2000	Benfica	4	(0)
1994–1995	→ Famalicão (loan)	7	(0)
1995–1997	→ Alverca (loan)	60	(2)
1997–1999	→ Alverca (loan)	60	(1)
1999	Benfica B	3	(0)
2000	Campomaiorense	14	(1)
2000–2001	Aves	15	(1)
2001–2002	Istres	0	(0)
2002–2003	Schweinfurt 05	13	(0)
2003–2004	Ettifaq		
2004–2006	Al-Shamal		
2006–2007	O Elvas		
2008	Salgaocar		
2008–2010	Badajoz		
Total		176	(5)

International career
1993	Portugal U17	3	(0)
1994	Portugal U18	3	(0)
1996	Portugal U20	9	(0)
1997	Portugal U21	5	(0)
Medal record
Men's football
Representing Portugal
FIFA U-20 World Cup
Third place	1995 Qatar
- * Club domestic league appearances and goals

José Feliciano Loureiro Soares (born 23 February 1976) is a Portuguese retired professional footballer who played as a central defender.

== Club career ==
Born in Elvas, Alentejo, Soares signed with Benfica in 1990 to compete his formation, from local O Elvas CAD. He served mainly as backup to the main squad during his spell, also being loaned to F.C. Alverca which acted as the farm team.

Soares made his Primeira Liga debut on 1 February 1998, playing the full 90 minutes in a 2–0 home win against Vitória de Setúbal. Benfica loaned him several times for the duration of his contract, including to S.C. Campomaiorense where he man-marked Mário Jardel out of the game in a surprising 1–0 victory over FC Porto on 19 February 2000, which led to suspension for both players due to on-pitch altercations. After being released he represented various clubs, in France, Germany, Saudi Arabia, Qatar, India and Spain, ending his career in 2010 at the age of 34.

== International career ==
Soares was part of the Portugal U20 national team squad in the 1995 FIFA World Youth Championship, partnering Sporting Clube de Portugal's Beto as the nation finished in third position in Qatar. One year before, he helped the under-18 win the 1994 UEFA European Under-18 Championship.
