= 1994–95 FC Porto season =

FC Porto
1994–95 season
- President: Jorge Nuno Pinto da Costa
- Head coach: Bobby Robson
- Stadium: Estádio das Antas
- Primeira Divisão: 1st
- Taça de Portugal: Semi-finals
- Supertaça Cândido de Oliveira: Winners
- UEFA Cup Winners' Cup: Quarter-finals
- Top goalscorer: League: Domingos (19); All: Domingos (26)
- Average home league attendance: 31,941
colours

The 1994–95 season was the 110th season in the existence of FC Porto and the club's 80th consecutive season in the top flight of Portuguese football. In addition to the domestic league, Porto participated in this season's editions of the Taça de Portugal and the UEFA Cup Winners' Cup.

== Squad ==
Note: Flags indicate national team as defined under FIFA eligibility rules; some limited exceptions apply. Players may hold more than one non-FIFA nationality.

No.	Pos.	Nation	Player
—	GK	POR	Vítor Baía
—	GK	POR	Cândido Rego
—	GK	POR	Vítor Nóvoa
—	DF	POR	João Pinto (captain)
—	DF	POR	Carlos Secretário
—	DF	POR	Rui Jorge
—	DF	BRA	Aloísio
—	DF	BRA	Zé Carlos
—	DF	POR	Jorge Costa
—	DF	POR	Bandeirinha
—	MF	BRA	Emerson
—	MF	POR	Paulinho Santos
—	MF	POR	Rui Barros
—	MF	RUS	Vasili Kulkov

No.	Pos.	Nation	Player
—	MF	SRB	Ljubinko Drulović
—	MF	TTO	Russell Latapy
—	MF	POR	Jorge Couto
—	MF	POR	António André
—	MF	POR	José Semedo
—	MF	POR	Rui Filipe
—	MF	POR	Jaime Magalhães
—	FW	PER	Ronald Baroni
—	FW	POR	Domingos
—	FW	POR	António Folha
—	FW	RUS	Sergei Yuran
—	FW	BUL	Emil Kostadinov
—	FW	COD	Étienne N'tsunda

== Club ==
=== Coaching staff ===
Position	Staff
Head coach	(England) Bobby Robson
Assistant coach	(Portugal) Augusto Inácio
Assistant coach	(Portugal) Manuel Barbosa
Assistant coach/Tactical Analyst	(Portugal) José Mourinho
Opposition scout	(Portugal) André Villas-Boas

=== Other information ===
Position	Staff
President	(Portugal) Jorge Nuno Pinto da Costa
Vice President	(Portugal) Adelino Caldeira
Director of Football Operations	(Portugal) Reinaldo Teles

== Competitions ==
=== Overall record ===
Competition	First match	Last match	Starting round	Final position	Record							
Competition	First match	Last match	Starting round	Final position	Pld	W	D	L	GF	GA	GD	Win %
Primeira Divisão	20 August 1994	27 May 1995	Matchday 1	Winners	34	29	4	1	73	15	+58	85.29
Taça de Portugal	23 December 1994	9 May 1995	Fourth round	Semi-finals	5	4	0	1	15	2	+13	80.00
Supertaça Cândido de Oliveira	24 August 1994	20 June 1995	Final	Winners	3	1	2	0	2	1	+1	33.33
UEFA Cup Winners' Cup	15 September 1994	16 March 1995	First round	Quarter-finals	6	4	0	2	10	3	+7	66.67
Total					48	38	6	4	100	21	+79	79.17

Source: Competitions

=== Supertaça Cândido de Oliveira ===
24 August 1994 First leg	Benfica	1–1	Porto	Lisbon
CEST (UTC+2) 20:00	Xavier (yellow card) 21' (yellow-red card) 35'; Paulão (yellow card) 22'; Pinto (yellow card) 26' (yellow-red card) 89'; Paneira 75' (yellow card) 90'; Nelo (red card) 80'	Report	Secretário (red card) 19'; Santos (yellow card) 43'; Aloísio (yellow card) 56'; Filipe 72'; Filipe (red card) 80'; André (yellow card) 81'	Stadium: Estádio da Luz; Attendance: 50,000; Referee: Carlos Calheiros

21 September 1994 Second leg	Porto	0–0	Benfica	Porto
CEST (UTC+2) 20:30	Kulkov (yellow card) 17'; Aloísio (yellow card) 68'	Report	Preud'homme (yellow card) 41'; Isaías (yellow card) 46'; Paulão (yellow card) 90'	Stadium: Estádio das Antas; Attendance: 40,000; Referee: Donato Ramos

20 June 1995 Replay	Porto	1–0	Benfica	Paris
CEST (UTC+2) 20:30	Bandeirinha (yellow card) 25'; Domingos 51'; Zé Carlos (yellow card) 70'	Report	Pereira (yellow card) 57'; Kenedy (yellow card) 65'	Stadium: Parc des Princes; Attendance: 48,000; Referee: Lucílio Baptista

=== Primeira Liga ===
==== League table ====
Pos	Team	Pld	W	D	L	GF	GA	GD	Pts	Qualification or relegation
1	Porto (C)	34	29	4	1	73	15	+58	62	Qualification to Champions League group stage
2	Sporting CP	34	23	9	2	59	21	+38	55	Qualification to Cup Winners' Cup first round (Note: Sporting qualified for the Cup Winners' Cup as Portuguese Cup winners)
3	Benfica	34	21	5	8	61	28	+33	47	Qualification to UEFA Cup first round
4	Vitória de Guimarães	34	16	10	8	54	43	+11	42	Qualification to UEFA Cup first round
5	Farense	34	16	5	13	44	38	+6	37	Qualification to UEFA Cup first round

Source: Primeira Divisão
Rules for classification: 1st points, 2nd head-to-head, 3rd goals average
(C) Champions

==== Results summary ====
Overall								Home						Away					
Pld	W	D	L	GF	GA	GD	Pts	W	D	L	GF	GA	GD	W	D	L	GF	GA	GD
34	29	4	1	73	15	+58	91	15	2	0	41	7	+34	14	2	1	32	8	+24

Source: Primeira Divisão

==== Results by round ====
Round	1	2	3	4	5	6	7	8	9	10	11	12	13	14	15	16	17	18	19	20	21	22	23	24	25	26	27	28	29	30	31	32	33	34
Ground	H	A	H	A	H	A	A	H	A	H	A	H	A	H	A	H	A	A	H	A	H	A	H	H	A	H	A	H	A	H	A	H	A	H
Result	W	W	W	W	W	D	L	W	W	W	W	W	W	D	W	W	W	W	W	D	W	W	W	W	W	W	W	W	W	D	W	W	W	W
Position	1	1	1	1	1	1	1	2	2	2	2	1	1	1	1	1	1	1	1	1	1	1	1	1	1	1	1	1	1	1	1	1	1	1

Source: Primeira Divisão
A = Away; H = Home; W = Win; D = Draw; L = Loss

==== Matches ====
21 August 1994 1	Porto	2–0	Braga	Porto
CEST (UTC+2)	Filipe 56' (yellow card); Kostadinov 89'; Emerson (yellow card)	Report		Stadium: Estádio das Antas; Attendance: 25,000; Referee: António Rola

28 August 1994 2	Beira-Mar	0–2	Porto	Aveiro
CEST (UTC+2)	Dinis (yellow card); Acácio (red card) 21'	Report	Barros 51'; Emerson 88'; Folha (yellow card)	Stadium: Estádio Municipal de Aveiro; Attendance: 19,000; Referee: Jorge Coroado

11 September 1994 3	Porto	3–0	União da Madeira	Porto
CEST (UTC+2)	Aloísio 10' (pen.); Folha 40'; Zé Carlos 54'	Report	Joílton (yellow card); Luizão (yellow card)	Stadium: Estádio das Antas; Attendance: 12,000; Referee: Mário Leal

17 September 1994 4	Vitória de Setúbal	2–3	Porto	Setúbal
CEST (UTC+2)	Filgueira 33' (yellow card) (yellow-red card) 38'; Gomes 45' (pen.); Sousa (yellow card); Stevanović (yellow card)	Report	Kulkov 40'; Barros 81'; Emerson 85'; Costa (yellow card); Aloísio (yellow card)	Stadium: Estádio do Bonfim; Attendance: 7,000; Referee: João Pinto Correia

24 September 1994 5	Porto	2–0	União de Leiria	Porto
CEST (UTC+2)	Domingos 46'; Barros 48'	Report	Fua (yellow card); Luís Miguel (yellow card); Bertolazzi (yellow card)	Stadium: Estádio das Antas; Attendance: 12,000; Referee: Cunha Antunes

2 October 1994 6	Benfica	1–1	Porto	Lisbon
CET (UTC+1)	Hélder (yellow card) (yellow-red card) 80'; Isaías 89'	Report	Santos (yellow card) (yellow-red card) 54'; Yuran 66' (yellow card) (yellow-red card) 74'	Stadium: Estádio da Luz; Attendance: 60,000; Referee: Bento Marques

15 October 1994 7	Marítimo	2–1	Porto	Funchal
CET (UTC+1)	Vado 68'; Rebelo 75'	Report	Domingos 86'; Aloísio 66' (yellow card)	Stadium: Estádio dos Barreiros; Attendance: 20,000; Referee: Vítor Melo Pereira

23 October 1994 8	Porto	1–0	Gil Vicente	Porto
CET (UTC+1)	Secretário 86'; Santos (yellow card)	Report	Vital (yellow card); Lemos (yellow card); Lila (yellow card); Cruz (yellow card); Santarém (yellow card)	Stadium: Estádio das Antas; Attendance: 25,000; Referee: Carlos Pinto

30 October 1994 9	Chaves	0–4	Porto	Chaves
CET (UTC+1)	Orlando (yellow card); Amarildo (yellow card)	Report	Barros 6'; Folha 57'; Zé Carlos 78', 90'; Pinto (yellow card); Secretário (yellow card)	Stadium: Estádio Municipal Eng. Manuel Branco Teixeira; Attendance: 12,000; Referee: Carlos Calheiros

5 November 1994 10	Porto	3–0	Vitória de Guimarães	Porto
CET (UTC+1)	Barros 46' (yellow card); Aloísio 82' (pen.); Yuran 89'; Emerson (yellow card)	Report	Matias (yellow card); Mbote (yellow card)	Stadium: Estádio das Antas; Attendance: 25,000; Referee: Pinto Correia

19 November 1994 11	Farense	0–3	Porto	Faro
CET (UTC+1)	Secretário 29'; Domingos 56'; Barros 59'; Kulkov (yellow card); Emerson (yellow card); Santos (yellow card)	Report	Devanir King (yellow card); Soares (yellow card); Serôdio (yellow card); Portela (yellow card)	Stadium: Estádio de São Luís; Attendance: 10,000; Referee: Jorge Coroado

25 November 1994 12	Porto	1–0	Belenenses	Porto
CET (UTC+1)	Secretário 64'; Domingos (yellow card)	Report		Stadium: Estádio das Antas; Attendance: 15,000; Referee: Mário Leal

2 December 1994 13	Estrela da Amadora	0–1	Porto	Amadora
CET (UTC+1)	Agatão (yellow card); Jorge (yellow card)	Report	Secretário 21' (yellow card); Pinto (yellow card); Kulkov (yellow card); Emerson (yellow card); Drulović (yellow card)	Stadium: Estádio José Gomes; Attendance: 5,000; Referee: Lucílio Batista

10 December 1994 14	Porto	1–1	Sporting CP	Porto
CET (UTC+1)	Zé Carlos 5'; Folha (yellow card)	Report	Figo 80'; Aurélio (yellow card); Naybet (yellow card); Amunike (yellow card)	Stadium: Estádio das Antas; Attendance: 70,000; Referee: José Veiga Trigo

30 December 1994 15	Boavista	1–2	Porto	Porto
CET (UTC+1)	Sánchez 21'; Bobó (yellow card)	Report	Emerson 47'; Kulkov 76'	Stadium: Estádio do Bessa; Attendance: 4,000; Referee: João Pinto Correia

8 January 1995 16	Porto	5–2	Salgueiros	Porto
CET (UTC+1)	Domingos 3', 21'; Zé Carlos 9'; Yuran 18' (yellow card); Aloísio 84' (pen.); Santos (yellow card)	Report	Simão 46'; Manuel (yellow card); Sérgio (yellow card); Vinha (yellow card)	Stadium: Estádio das Antas; Attendance: 40,000; Referee: Monteiro da Silva

14 January 1995 17	Tirsense	0–2	Porto	Santo Tirso
CET (UTC+1)	Evandro (yellow card)	Report	Domingos 48'; Barros 87'; Baía (yellow card); Pinto (yellow card); Emerson (yellow card); Yuran (yellow card)	Stadium: Estádio Abel Alves de Figueiredo; Attendance: 12,000; Referee: Carlos Calheiros

21 January 1995 18	Porto	1–4	Braga	Braga
CET (UTC+1)	Barroso 16'; Jorge (yellow card); Eugénio (yellow card)	Report	Domingos 1', 78'; Zé Carlos 12' (yellow card); Yuran 56' (yellow card) (yellow-red card) 61'; Kulkov (yellow card); Secretário (yellow card)	Stadium: Estádio 1º de Maio; Attendance: 8,000; Referee: Donato Ramos

5 February 1995 19	Porto	3–0	Beira-Mar	Porto
CET (UTC+1)	Domingos 30'; Aloísio 34'; Zé Carlos 90'; Santos (yellow card)	Report	Eliseu (yellow card); Tarcísio (yellow card)	Stadium: Estádio das Antas; Attendance: 4,000; Referee: Cunha Antunes

11 February 1995 20	União da Madeira	0–0	Porto	Funchal
CET (UTC+1)	Gaćeša (yellow card); Valença (red card); Nelinho (yellow card); Jokanović (yellow card)	Report	Secretário (red card) 20'; Jorge (red card) 46'; Zé Carlos (yellow card); Domingos (yellow card); Folha (yellow card)	Stadium: Estádio dos Barreiros; Attendance: 2,000; Referee: João Pinto Correia

19 February 1995 21	Porto	2–0	Vitória de Setúbal	Porto
CET (UTC+1)	Drulović 1', 51'; Aloísio (yellow card)	Report	Filgueira (yellow card)	Stadium: Estádio das Antas; Attendance: 45,000; Referee: Mário Mendes

28 February 1995 22	União de Leiria	0–2	Porto	Leiria
CET (UTC+1)	Crespo (red card) 71'; Leonel (red card) 89'; Morais (yellow card); Bilro (yellow card)	Report	Drulović 12'; Emerson 57' (yellow card); Latapy (red card) 80'; Santos (yellow card); Yuran (yellow card); Costa (yellow card)	Stadium: Estádio Dr. Magalhães Pessoa; Attendance: 5,000; Referee: Jorge Coroado

5 March 1995 23	Porto	2–1	Benfica	Porto
CET (UTC+1)	Zé Carlos 7' (yellow card); Secretário (yellow card) (yellow-red card) 40'; Drulović 75'; Jorge (yellow card); Barros (yellow card); Costa (yellow card)	Report	Pinto 38' (yellow card); Madeira (yellow card); Pereira (yellow card); William (yellow card); Isaías (yellow card); Bento (yellow card); Paneira (yellow card); Amaral (yellow card); Dimas (yellow card) (yellow-red card) 86'	Stadium: Estádio das Antas; Attendance: 55,000; Referee: José Pratas

12 March 1995 24	Porto	4–1	Marítimo	Porto
CET (UTC+1)	Paciência 6'; Drulović 14'; Folha 43'; Baroni 87'; Yuran (yellow card)	Report	Jorge 35' (yellow card); Robson (yellow card) (yellow-red card) 52'	Stadium: Estádio das Antas; Attendance: 45,000; Referee: António Marçal

20 March 1995 25	Gil Vicente	0–1	Porto	Barcelos
CET (UTC+1)	Carlos (yellow card)	Report	Emerson 75'	Stadium: Estádio Adelino Ribeiro Novo; Attendance: 10,000; Referee: Donato Ramos

25 March 1995 26	Porto	2–0	Chaves	Porto
CET (UTC+1)	Domingos 20'; Secretário 41'; Aloísio (yellow card); Emerson (yellow card); Yuran (yellow card)	Report	Cerqueira (yellow card)	Stadium: Estádio das Antas; Attendance: 25,000; Referee: Mário Leal

2 April 1995 27	Vitória de Guimarães	0–1	Porto	Guimarães
CEST (UTC+2)	Matias (yellow card)	Report	Domingos 66'; Baía (yellow card); Santos (yellow card); Yuran (yellow card)	Stadium: Estádio D. Afonso Henriques; Attendance: 20,000; Referee: Lucílio Batista

9 April 1995 28	Porto	2–0	Farense	Porto
CEST (UTC+2)	Domingos 33' (pen.); Folha 85'; Pinto (yellow card); Emerson (yellow card)	Report	Rufai (yellow card); Serôdio (yellow card); Duarte (yellow card)	Stadium: Estádio das Antas; Attendance: 40,000; Referee: Cunha Antunes

16 April 1995 29	Belenenses	0–2	Porto	Lisbon
CEST (UTC+2)	João Pinto (yellow card); Airez (yellow card); Dacroce (yellow card)	Report	Domingos 25'; Latapy 48'; Baía (yellow card); Zé Carlos (yellow card); Aloísio (yellow card); Santos (yellow card)	Stadium: Estádio do Restelo; Attendance: 5,000; Referee: Juvenal Silvestre

30 April 1995 30	Porto	0–0	Estrela da Amadora	Porto
CEST (UTC+2)	Kulkov (yellow card); Zé Carlos	Report	Edmundo (yellow card); Neves (yellow card); Mário Jorge (yellow card)	Stadium: Estádio das Antas; Attendance: 12,000; Referee: Mário Mendes

7 May 1995 31	Sporting CP	0–1	Porto	Lisbon
CEST (UTC+2)	Paulo Torres (yellow card); Yordanov (yellow card); Amunike (yellow card)	Report	Domingos 58' (pen.); Baía (yellow card); Emerson (yellow card); Barros (yellow card)	Stadium: Estádio José Alvalade; Attendance: 25,000; Referee: Joaquim Bento Marques

14 May 1995 32	Porto	4–2	Boavista	Porto
CEST (UTC+2)	Barros 2'; Aloísio 17' (yellow card); Domingos 47'; Folha 57'; João Pinto (yellow card); Kulkov (yellow card); Baroni (yellow card)	Report	Rosário 36'; Artur 42' (pen.); Alfredo (yellow card); Abazi (yellow card); Paulo Sousa (yellow card)	Stadium: Estádio das Antas; Attendance: 7,000; Referee: João Mesquita

21 May 1995 33	Salgueiros	1–2	Porto	Porto
CEST (UTC+2)	Tulipa 90'	Report	Barros 24'; Domingos 54'; Aloísio (yellow card)	Stadium: Estádio Engenheiro Vidal Pinheiro; Attendance: 5,000; Referee: António Miranda

28 May 1995 34	Porto	4–0	Tirsense	Porto
CEST (UTC+2)	Folha 55' (yellow card); Domingos 74', 80'; Costa 84'	Report	Gregório (yellow card)	Stadium: Estádio das Antas; Attendance: 50,000; Referee: Paulo Paraty

=== Taça de Portugal ===
4 December 1994 Fourth round	Porto	3–1	Estoril	Porto
CET (UTC+1)	Domingos 60'; Jorge Couto 75'; Zé Carlos 80'; Costa (yellow card)		José Carlos 66'; Jorge (yellow card)	Stadium: Estádio das Antas; Referee: Monteiro da Silva

23 December 1994 Fifth round	Porto	5–0	União de Leiria	Porto
CET (UTC+1)	Zé Carlos 20'; Barros 49', 60'; P. Santos 52'; Domingos 82'		Paulito (yellow card); Gervino (yellow card)	Stadium: Estádio das Antas; Referee: Augusto Duarte

15 February 1995 Round of 16	Porto	3–0	Louletano	Porto
CET (UTC+1)	Baroni 10', 50'; Costa 39' (yellow card); Yuran (yellow card)			Stadium: Estádio das Antas; Referee: Manuel Sineiro

29 March 1995 Quarter-finals	Leça	0–4	Porto	Leça da Palmeira
CEST (UTC+2)	Serifo (yellow card); Stojković (yellow card)		Barros 32'; Domingos 41', 55'; Latapy 50'	Stadium: Estádio do Leça FC; Referee: Lourenço Ferreira

9 May 1995 Semi-finals	Marítimo	1–0	Porto	Funchal
CEST (UTC+2)	Bunbury 21'; Duarte (yellow card)		Emerson (yellow card); Zé Carlos (yellow card)	Stadium: Estádio dos Barreiros

=== UEFA Cup Winners' Cup ===
==== First round ====
15 September 1994 First leg	Porto (Portugal)	2–0	(Poland) ŁKS Łódź	Estádio das Antas, Porto
21:30 CEST	Domingos 71'; Barros 76'	Report		Attendance: 17,000; Referee: Sándor Piller (Hungary)

29 September 1994 Second leg	ŁKS Łódź (Poland)	0–1	(Portugal) Porto	Stadion Miejski ŁKS, Łódź
18:00 CEST		Report	Drulović 44'; Jorge (red card) 31'	Attendance: 6,113; Referee: Martin Bodenham (England)

==== Second round ====
20 October 1994 First leg	Porto (Portugal)	6–0	(Hungary) Ferencvárosi	Estádio das Antas, Porto
21:30 CET	Costa 14'; Barros 15'; Drulović 40', 58'; Domingos 85'; Aloísio 87'; Bandeirinha (yellow card)	Report	Czéh (yellow card); Lisztes (yellow card)	Attendance: 15,880; Referee: Marnix Sandra (Belgium)

3 November 1994 Second leg	Ferencvárosi (Hungary)	2–0	(Portugal) Porto	Üllői úti stadion, Budapest
19:00 CET	Zavadszky 27'; Neagoe 60'; Albert Jr. (yellow card)	Report	Bandeirinha (yellow card) 12' (yellow-red card) 50'	Attendance: 9,385; Referee: Alfredo Trentalange (Italy)

==== Quarter-finals ====
2 March 1995 First leg	Sampdoria (Italy)	0–1	(Portugal) Porto	Stadio Luigi Ferraris, Genoa
20:45 CET	Vierchowod (yellow card); Mannini (yellow card); Mihajlović (yellow card)	Report	Yuran 64'; Paulinho Santos (yellow card)	Attendance: 21,004; Referee: David Elleray (England)

16 March 1995 Second leg	Porto (Portugal)	0–1 (1–1 agg.) (3–5 p)	(Italy) Sampdoria	Estádio das Antas, Porto
21:30 CET	Yuran (yellow card); Zé Carlos (yellow card)	Report	Mancini 50'; Jugović (yellow card); Mihajlović (yellow card); Lombardo (yellow card); Platt (red card) 117'	Attendance: 35,076; Referee: Marc Batta (France)
	Penalties
	Emerson (penalty scored); Latapy (penalty missed); Domingos (penalty scored); Folha (penalty scored)		(penalty scored) Mihajlović; (penalty scored) Jugović; (penalty scored) Maspero; (penalty scored) Salsano; (penalty scored) Lombardo
