= Portugal national football team results (1980–1999) =

This page is a list of all the matches that Portugal national football team has played between 1980 and 1999.

== Results ==
Key
Win
Draw
Defeat

=== 1980 ===
26-03-1980 (Italy) 1980 EURO Q	Scotland	4 – 1	Portugal	(Scotland) Hampden Park, Glasgow
	Kenny Dalglish 6'; Andy Gray I 26'; Steve Archibald 68'; Archie Gemmill 84' (pen.)		74' Fernando Gomes	Attendance: 20,233; Referee: (France) Robert Wurtz

24-09-1980 Friendly	Italy	3 – 1	Portugal	(Italy) Stadio Luigi Ferraris, Genoa
	Alessandro Altobelli 63', 80'; Francesco Graziani 88'		64' Rui Jordão	Attendance: 27,251; Referee: (Austria) Franz Wöhrer

07-10-1980 Friendly	Portugal	1 – 1	United States	(Portugal) Estádio do Restelo, Lisbon
	Carlos Manuel 65'		67' Rick Davis	Attendance: 15,000; Referee: (Spain) José Luis García Carrión

15-10-1980 (Spain) 1982 W.C. Q	Scotland	0 – 0	Portugal	(Scotland) Hampden Park, Glasgow
				Attendance: 60,765; Referee: (West Germany) Jan Redelfs

19-11-1980 (Spain) 1982 W.C. Q	Portugal	1 – 0	Northern Ireland	(Portugal) Estádio da Luz (1954), Lisbon
	Rui Jordão 60'			Attendance: 60,000; Referee: (France) Georges Konrath

17-12-1980 (Spain) 1982 W.C. Q	Portugal	3 – 0	Israel	(Portugal) Estádio da Luz (1954), Lisbon
	Humberto Coelho 33', 72'; Rui Jordão 36'			Attendance: 55,000; Referee: (Italy) Enzo Barbaresco

=== 1981 ===
15-04-1981 Friendly	Portugal	1 – 1	Bulgaria	(Portugal) Estádio das Antas, Porto
	Oliveira 65'		61' Chavdar Tsvetkov	Attendance: 6,000; Referee: (Spain) Ángel Franco Martínez

29-04-1981 (Spain) 1982 W.C. Q	Northern Ireland	1 – 0	Portugal	(Northern Ireland) Windsor Park, Belfast
	Gerry Armstrong 74'			Attendance: 18,000; Referee: (Norway) Svein-Inge Thime

20-06-1981 Friendly	Portugal	2 – 0	Spain	(Portugal) Estádio das Antas, Porto
	Nené 80'; António Nogueira 83'			Attendance: 5,000; Referee: (France) Marcel Bacou

24-06-1981 (Spain) 1982 W.C. Q	Sweden	3 – 0	Portugal	(Sweden) Råsunda Stadium, Solna
	Bo Börjesson 39'; Glenn Hysén 58'; Jan Svensson 73'			Attendance: 34,531; Referee: (Soviet Union) Anatoly Milchenko

23-09-1981 Friendly	Portugal	2 – 0	Poland	(Portugal) Estádio José Alvalade (1956), Lisbon
	Nené 48'; Shéu Han 52'			Attendance: 20,000; Referee: (Spain) Victoriano Sánchez Arminio

14-10-1981 (Spain) 1982 W.C. Q	Portugal	1 – 2	Sweden	(Portugal) Estádio da Luz (1954), Lisbon
	Minervino Pietra 65'		39' Thomas Larsson; 89' Tony Persson	Attendance: 75,000; Referee: (Wales) Ronald Bridges

28-10-1981 (Spain) 1982 W.C. Q	Israel	4 – 1	Portugal	(Israel) Ramat Gan Stadium, Ramat Gan
	Benny Tabak 6', 18', 30'; Gidi Damti 14'		8' Rui Jordão	Attendance: 20,000; Referee: (Cyprus) Sotos Afxentiou

18-11-1981 (Spain) 1982 W.C. Q	Portugal	2 – 1	Scotland	(Portugal) Estádio da Luz (1954), Lisbon
	Manuel Fernandes I 33', 56'		9' Paul Sturrock	Attendance: 25,000; Referee: (Netherlands) Charles Corver

16-12-1981 Friendly	Bulgaria	5 – 2	Portugal	(Bulgaria) Haskovo Stadium, Haskovo
	Radoslav Zdravkov 15' (pen.), 20', 73'; Tsvetan Yonchev 23', 48'		11', 89' Oliveira	Attendance: 15,000; Referee: (Czechoslovakia) Vojtech Christov

=== 1982 ===
20-01-1982 Friendly	Greece	1 – 2	Portugal	(Greece) Nikos Goumas Stadium, Athens
	Nikos Anastopoulos 24'		42', 77' Oliveira	Attendance: 8,753; Referee: (West Germany) Günter Linn

17-02-1982 Friendly	West Germany	3 – 1	Portugal	(West Germany) Niedersachsenstadion, Hanover
	Klaus Fischer 23', 51'; Humberto Coelho 27' (o.g.)		43' Norton de Matos	Attendance: 50,000; Referee: (Belgium) Alexis Ponnet

24-03-1982 Friendly	Switzerland	2 – 1	Portugal	(Switzerland) Cornaredo Stadium, Lugano
	Gian-Pietro Zappa 43'; André Egli 60'		34' Nené	Attendance: 13,800; Referee: (West Germany) Karl-Heinz Tritschler

05-05-1982 Friendly	Brazil	3 – 1	Portugal	(Brazil) Castelão (Maranhão), São Luís, Maranhão
	Leovegildo Júnior 17'; Éder 72' (pen.); Zico 82'		90' (pen.) Nené	Attendance: 71,560; Referee: (Brazil) Carlos Sérgio Rosa Martins

22-09-1982 (France) 1984 EURO Q	Finland	0 – 2	Portugal	(Finland) Olympic Stadium, Helsinki
			15' Nené; 89' Oliveira	Attendance: 3,132; Referee: (East Germany) Klaus Scheurell

10-10-1982 (France) 1984 EURO Q	Portugal	2 – 1	Poland	(Portugal) Estádio da Luz (1954), Lisbon
	Nené 2'; Fernando Gomes 81'		90' Paweł Król	Attendance: 70,000; Referee: (Austria) Franz Wöhrer

=== 1983 ===
16-02-1983 Friendly	Portugal	0 – 3	France	(Portugal) Estádio D. Afonso Henriques, Guimarães
			7', 70' Yannick Stopyra; 8' Jean-Marc Ferreri	Attendance: 9,000; Referee: (Switzerland) Ulrich Nyffenegger

23-02-1983 Friendly	Portugal	1 – 0	West Germany	(Portugal) Estádio do Restelo, Lisbon
	Dito 57'			Attendance: 10,000; Referee: (France) Marcel Bacou

13-04-1983 Friendly	Portugal	0 – 0	Hungary	(Portugal) Estádio Municipal de Coimbra, Coimbra
				Attendance: 15,000; Referee: (France) Georges Konrath

27-04-1983 (France) 1984 EURO Q	Soviet Union	5 – 0	Portugal	(Soviet Union) Lenin Stadium, Moscow
	Fyodor Cherenkov 16', 23'; Sergey Rodionov 40'; Anatoliy Demyanenko 53'; Nikolay Larionov 86'			Attendance: 90,000; Referee: (England) John Hunting

08-06-1983 Friendly	Portugal	0 – 4	Brazil	(Portugal) Estádio Municipal de Coimbra, Coimbra
			39', 55' Careca I 40' Sócrates; 65' Pedrinho I	Attendance: 17,000; Referee: (Portugal) Mário Luís

21-09-1983 (France) 1984 EURO Q	Portugal	5 – 0	Finland	(Portugal) Estádio José Alvalade (1956), Lisbon
	Rui Jordão 18'; Carlos Manuel 23'; Jukka Ikäläinen 46' (o.g.); José Luís 82'; Oliveira 85'			Attendance: 15,000; Referee: (West Germany) Karl-Heinz Tritschler

28-10-1983 (France) 1984 EURO Q	Poland	0 – 1	Portugal	(Poland) Olympic Stadium, Wrocław
			31' Carlos Manuel	Attendance: 15,000; Referee: (Sweden) Ulf Eriksson

13-11-1983 (France) 1984 EURO Q	Portugal	1 – 0	Soviet Union	(Portugal) Estádio da Luz (1954), Lisbon
	Rui Jordão 44' (pen.)			Attendance: 75,000; Referee: (France) Georges Konrath

=== 1984 ===
02-06-1984 Friendly	Portugal	2 – 3	Yugoslavia	(Portugal) Estádio Nacional, Lisbon
	Rui Jordão 14', 33'		19' Safet Sušić; 43' Sulejman Halilović; 82' (pen.) Dragan Stojković	Attendance: 10,000; Referee: (Spain) José Luis García Carrión

09-06-1984 Friendly	Luxembourg	1 – 2	Portugal	Stade Josy Barthel, Luxembourg
	Nico Wagner 34'		56' Eurico Gomes; 62' Diamantino Miranda	Attendance: 5,000; Referee: (Israel) Itzhak Ben Itzhak

14-06-1984 (France) 1984 EURO GS	West Germany	0 – 0	Portugal	(France) Stade de la Meinau, Strasbourg
15:15 WET				Attendance: 44,566; Referee: (Soviet Union) Romualdas Yushka

17-06-1984 (France) 1984 EURO GS	Portugal	1 – 1	Spain	(France) Stade Vélodrome, Marseille
18:30 WET	António Sousa 52'		73' Santillana	Attendance: 24,364; Referee: (France) Michel Vautrot

20-06-1984 (France) 1984 EURO GS	Portugal	1 – 0	Romania	(France) Stade de la Beaujoire, Nantes
18:30 WET	Nené 81'			Attendance: 24,266; Referee: (Austria) Heinz Fahnler

23-06-1984 (France) 1984 EURO 1/2	France	3 – 2 (a.e.t.)	Portugal	(France) Stade Vélodrome, Marseille
18:00 WET	Jean-François Domergue 24', 114'; Michel Platini 119'		74', 98' Rui Jordão	Attendance: 54,848; Referee: (Italy) Paolo Bergamo

06-09-1984 Friendly	Portugal	1 – 0	Bulgaria	(Portugal) Estádio do Restelo, Lisbon
	Eurico Gomes 21' (pen.)			Attendance: 5,500; Referee: (Spain) Victoriano Sánchez Arminio

12-09-1984 (Mexico) 1986 W.C. Q	Sweden	0 – 1	Portugal	(Sweden) Råsunda Stadium, Solna
			79' Fernando Gomes	Attendance: 30,136; Referee: (France) Joël Quiniou

14-10-1984 (Mexico) 1986 W.C. Q	Portugal	2 – 1	Czechoslovakia	(Portugal) Estádio das Antas, Porto
	Diamantino Miranda 13'; Carlos Manuel 48'		38' Petr Janečka	Attendance: 32,500; Referee: (England) George Courtney

14-11-1984 (Mexico) 1986 W.C. Q	Portugal	1 – 3	Sweden	(Portugal) Estádio José Alvalade (1956), Lisbon
	Rui Jordão 12'		26' (pen.), 34' Robert Prytz; 38' Torbjörn Nilsson	Attendance: 21,089; Referee: (Belgium) Roger Schoeters

=== 1985 ===
30-01-1985 Friendly	Portugal	2 – 3	Romania	(Portugal) Estádio José Alvalade (1956), Lisbon
	Paulo Futre 10'; Carlos Manuel 47'		57', 77' Marius Lăcătuş; 84' Gheorghe Hagi	Attendance: 3,000; Referee: (Spain) Emilio Soriano Aladrén

10-02-1985 (Mexico) 1986 W.C. Q	Malta	1 – 3	Portugal	(Malta) Ta' Qali National Stadium, Ta' Qali
	Nardu Farrugia 59'		6' Carlos Manuel; 13', 73' Fernando Gomes	Attendance: 22,610; Referee: (Hungary) Miklós Nagy

24-02-1985 (Mexico) 1986 W.C. Q	Portugal	1 – 2	West Germany	(Portugal) Estádio Nacional, Lisbon
	Diamantino Miranda 57'		28' Pierre Littbarski; 37' Rudi Völler	Attendance: 60,000; Referee: (Italy) Paolo Casarin

03-04-1985 Friendly	Italy	2 – 0	Portugal	(Italy) Stadio Cino e Lillo Del Duca, Ascoli Piceno
	Bruno Conti 40'; Paolo Rossi 78' (pen.)			Attendance: 30,000; Referee: (England) George Courtney

25-09-1985 (Mexico) 1986 W.C. Q	Czechoslovakia	1 – 0	Portugal	(Czechoslovakia) Strahov Stadium, Prague
	Vladimír Hruška 20'			Attendance: 9,000; Referee: (Socialist Federal Republic of Yugoslavia) Damir Matovinović

12-10-1985 (Mexico) 1986 W.C. Q	Portugal	3 – 2	Malta	(Portugal) Estádio da Luz (1954), Lisbon
	Fernando Gomes 38', 82'; José Rafael 53'		49' (o.g.) Frederico Rosa; 79' Michael Degiorgio	Attendance: 15,000; Referee: (Northern Ireland) Alan Snoddy

16-10-1985 (Mexico) 1986 W.C. Q	West Germany	0 – 1	Portugal	(West Germany) Neckarstadion, Stuttgart
			54' Carlos Manuel	Attendance: 65,000; Referee: (England) Keith Hackett

=== 1986 ===
22-01-1986 Friendly	Portugal	1 – 1	Finland	(Portugal) Estádio Dr. Magalhães Pessoa, Leiria
	Diamantino Miranda 72'		14' Ari Hjelm	Attendance: 10,000; Referee: (Spain) José Donato Pez Pérez

05-02-1986 Friendly	Portugal	2 – 0	Luxembourg	(Portugal) Estádio Municipal de Portimão, Portimão
	Frederico Rosa 3'; Fernando Gomes 21'			Attendance: 6,000; Referee: (Spain) Emilio Carlos Guruceta Muro

19-02-1986 Friendly	Portugal	1 – 3	East Germany	(Portugal) Estádio Primeiro de Maio, Braga
	Fernando Gomes 63' (pen.)		7' Andreas Thom; 24' Ulf Kirsten; 33' Rainer Ernst	Attendance: 8,000; Referee: (Spain) Augusto Lamo Castillo

03-06-1986 (Mexico) 1986 W.C. GS	Portugal	1 – 0	England	(Mexico) Estadio Tecnológico, Monterrey
22:00 WET	Carlos Manuel 76'			Attendance: 23,000; Referee: (West Germany) Volker Roth

07-06-1986 (Mexico) 1986 W.C. GS	Poland	1 – 0	Portugal	(Mexico) Estadio Universitario, Monterrey
22:00 WET	Włodzimierz Smolarek 68'			Attendance: 19,915; Referee: (Tunisia) Ali Bin Nasser

11-06-1986 (Mexico) 1986 W.C. GS	Portugal	1 – 3	Morocco	(Mexico) Estadio Tres de Marzo, Guadalajara
22:00 WET	Diamantino Miranda 80'		19', 26' Abderrazak Khairi; 62' Abdelkrim Merry	Attendance: 28,000; Referee: (Northern Ireland) Alan Snoddy

12-10-1986 (West Germany) 1988 EURO Q	Portugal	1 – 1	Sweden	(Portugal) Estádio Nacional, Lisbon
	José Coelho 67'		50' Glenn Strömberg	Attendance: 20,000; Referee: (England) Keith Hackett

29-10-1986 (West Germany) 1988 EURO Q	Switzerland	1 – 1	Portugal	(Switzerland) Wankdorf Stadium, Bern
	Georges Bregy 6'		86' Manuel Fernandes I	Attendance: 11,000; Referee: (East Germany) Siegfried Kirschen

=== 1987 ===
07-01-1987 Friendly	Portugal	1 – 1	Greece	(Portugal) Estádio Municipal de Portalegre, Portalegre
	José Coelho 72'		90' Kostas Mbatsinilas	Attendance: 7,000; Referee: (Spain) Emilio Guruceta

04-02-1987 Friendly	Portugal	1 – 0	Belgium	(Portugal) Estádio Primeiro de Maio, Braga
	António Frasco 45'			Attendance: 9,000; Referee: (France) Joël Quiniou

14-02-1987 (West Germany) 1988 EURO Q	Portugal	0 – 1	Italy	(Portugal) Estádio Nacional, Lisbon
			40' Alessandro Altobelli	Attendance: 32,500; Referee: (France) Michel Vautrot

29-03-1987 (West Germany) 1988 EURO Q	Portugal	2 – 2	Malta	(Portugal) Estádio dos Barreiros, Funchal
	Jorge Plácido 12', 78'		24' (pen.) Dennis Mizzi; 67' Carmel Busuttil	Attendance: 12,000; Referee: (Republic of Ireland) John Kinsella

23-09-1987 (West Germany) 1988 EURO Q	Sweden	0 – 1	Portugal	(Sweden) Råsunda Stadium, Solna
			34' Fernando Gomes	Attendance: 28,916; Referee: (Soviet Union) Valeri Butenko

11-11-1987 (West Germany) 1988 EURO Q	Portugal	0 – 0	Switzerland	(Portugal) Estádio das Antas, Porto
				Attendance: 12,500; Referee: (Hungary) Lajos Németh

05-12-1987 (West Germany) 1988 EURO Q	Italy	3 – 0	Portugal	(Italy) San Siro, Milan
	Gianluca Vialli 8'; Giuseppe Giannini 85'; Luigi De Agostini 88'			Attendance: 13,524; Referee: (Netherlands) Jan Keizer

20-12-1987 (West Germany) 1988 EURO Q	Malta	0 – 1	Portugal	(Malta) Ta' Qali National Stadium, Ta' Qali
			31' Frederico Rosa	Attendance: 5,651; Referee: (Austria) Hubert Forstinger

=== 1988 ===
12-10-1988 Friendly	Sweden	0 – 0	Portugal	(Sweden) Ullevi, Gothenburg
				Attendance: 10,100; Referee: (Norway) Egil Nervik

16-11-1988 (Italy) 1990 W.C. Q	Portugal	1 – 0	Luxembourg	(Portugal) Estádio do Bessa, Porto
	Fernando Gomes 31'			Attendance: 5,925; Referee: (Republic of Ireland) Michael Caulfield

=== 1989 ===
25-01-1989 Friendly	Greece	1 – 2	Portugal	(Greece) Olympic Stadium, Athens
	Stefanos Borbokis 63'		6' Adelino Nunes; 65' Vítor Paneira	Attendance: 834; Referee: (Italy) Tullio Lanese

15-02-1989 (Italy) 1990 W.C. Q	Portugal	1 – 1	Belgium	(Portugal) Estádio da Luz (1954), Lisbon
	Vítor Paneira 53'		84' Marc Van Der Linden	Attendance: 43,501; Referee: (France) Gérard Biguet

29-03-1989 Friendly	Portugal	6 – 0	Angola	(Portugal) Estádio José Alvalade (1956), Lisbon
	António Oliveira 20'; Frederico Rosa 39', 87'; António André 54'; Adelino Nunes 56'; José Semedo 63'			Attendance: 25,000; Referee: (Spain) Joaquín Ramos

26-04-1989 (Italy) 1990 W.C. Q	Portugal	3 – 1	Switzerland	(Portugal) Estádio da Luz (1954), Lisbon
	João Domingos Pinto 48'; Frederico Rosa 56'; Vítor Paneira 69'		64' Dario Zuffi	Attendance: 18,460; Referee: (England) Allan Gunn

08-06-1989 Friendly	Brazil	4 – 0	Portugal	(Brazil) Maracanã, Rio de Janeiro
	Bebeto 26'; Luís Sobrinho 31' (o.g.); Ricardo Gomes 47'; Charles Santos 75'			Attendance: 33,496; Referee: (Uruguay) Juan Cardellino

31-08-1989 Friendly	Portugal	0 – 0	Romania	(Portugal) Estádio do Bonfim, Setúbal
				Attendance: 5,000; Referee: (Spain) Joaquín Sánchez Marcos

06-09-1989 (Italy) 1990 W.C. Q	Belgium	3 – 0	Portugal	(Belgium) Heysel Stadium, Brussels
	Jan Ceulemans 34'; Marc Van Der Linden 59', 69'			Attendance: 28,250; Referee: (Soviet Union) Alexey Spirin

20-09-1989 (Italy) 1990 W.C. Q	Switzerland	1 – 2	Portugal	(Switzerland) Stade de la Maladière (1924), Neuchâtel
	Kubilay Türkyilmaz 28' (pen.)		74' (pen.) Paulo Futre; 77' Rui Águas	Attendance: 16,500; Referee: (Greece) Georgios Koukoulakis

06-10-1989 (Italy) 1990 W.C. Q	Czechoslovakia	2 – 1	Portugal	(Czechoslovakia) Letná Stadium, Prague
	Michal Bílek 11' (pen.), 83'		74' Rui Águas	Attendance: 29,809; Referee: (West Germany) Aron Schmidhuber

11-10-1989 (Italy) 1990 W.C. Q	Luxembourg	0 – 3	Portugal	(West Germany) Ludwigsparkstadion, Saarbrücken
			43', 53' Rui Águas; 72' Rui Barros	Attendance: 1,800; Referee: (Republic of Ireland) John Purcell

15-11-1989 (Italy) 1990 W.C. Q	Portugal	0 – 0	Czechoslovakia	(Portugal) Estádio da Luz (1954), Lisbon
				Attendance: 40,000; Referee: (Scotland) David Syme

=== 1990 ===
29-08-1990 Friendly	Portugal	1 – 1	West Germany	(Portugal) Estádio da Luz (1954), Lisbon
	Rui Águas 57'		15' Lothar Matthäus	Attendance: 20,000; Referee: (Italy) Rosario Lo Bello

12-09-1990 (Sweden) 1992 EURO Q	Finland	0 – 0	Portugal	(Finland) Olympic Stadium, Helsinki
				Attendance: 10,242; Referee: (Czechoslovakia) Jozef Marko

17-10-1990 (Sweden) 1992 EURO Q	Portugal	1 – 0	Netherlands	(Portugal) Estádio das Antas, Porto
	Rui Águas 53'			Attendance: 17,198; Referee: (Germany) Siegfried Kirschen

19-12-1990 Friendly	Portugal	1 – 0	United States	(Portugal) Estádio Municipal Dr. José Vieira de Carvalho, Maia
	Domingos Paciência 8'			Attendance: 2,000; Referee: (Spain) Joaquín Ramos Marcos

=== 1991 ===
16-01-1991 Friendly	Spain	1 – 1	Portugal	(Spain) Nou Estadi Castalia, Castellón de la Plana
	Gabriel Moya 71'		40' Oceano da Cruz	Attendance: 12,300; Referee: (Italy) Arcangelo Pezzela

23-01-1991 (Sweden) 1992 EURO Q	Greece	3 – 2	Portugal	(Greece) Olympic Stadium, Athens
	Stefanos Borbokis 7'; Stelios Manolas 68'; Panagiotis Tsalouchidis 84'		18' Rui Águas; 61' Paulo Futre	Attendance: 25,000; Referee: (Italy) Carlo Longhi

09-02-1991 (Sweden) 1992 EURO Q	Malta	0 – 1	Portugal	(Malta) Ta' Qali National Stadium, Ta' Qali
			26' Paulo Futre	Attendance: 6,000; Referee: (Germany) Manfred Neuner

20-02-1991 (Sweden) 1992 EURO Q	Portugal	5 – 0	Malta	(Portugal) Estádio das Antas, Porto
	Rui Águas 4'; José Leal 34'; Charles Scerri 48' (o.g.); Vítor Paneira 49' (pen.); Jorge Cadete 81'			Attendance: 5,000; Referee: (Republic of Ireland) John Spillane

04-09-1991 Friendly	Portugal	1 – 1	Austria	(Portugal) Estádio das Antas, Porto
	Rui Barros 31'		70' Walter Kogler	Attendance: 12,000; Referee: (Spain) Raúl García de Loza

11-09-1991 (Sweden) 1992 EURO Q	Portugal	1 – 0	Finland	(Portugal) Estádio das Antas, Porto
	César Brito 22'			Attendance: 30,000; Referee: (Switzerland) Arturo Martino

12-10-1991 Friendly	Luxembourg	1 – 1	Portugal	Stade Josy Barthel, Luxembourg
	Carlo Weis 65' (pen.)		48' Nogueira dos Santos	Attendance: 3,000; Referee: (Belgium) Alphonse Constantin

16-10-1991 (Sweden) 1992 EURO Q	Netherlands	1 – 0	Portugal	(Netherlands) De Kuip, Rotterdam
	Richard Witschge 22'			Attendance: 50,000; Referee: (England) George Courtney

20-11-1991 (Sweden) 1992 EURO Q	Portugal	1 – 0	Greece	(Portugal) Estádio da Luz (1954), Lisbon
	João Vieira Pinto 26'			Attendance: 25,000; Referee: (Belgium) Alphonse Constantin

=== 1992 ===
15-01-1992 Friendly	Portugal	0 – 0	Spain	(Portugal) Estádio Municipal Dr. Alves Vieira, Torres Novas
				Attendance: 11,000; Referee: (France) Antoine De Pandis

12-02-1992 Friendly	Portugal	2 – 0	Netherlands	(Portugal) Estádio de São Luís, Faro
	Oceano da Cruz 3'; César Brito 79'			Attendance: 3,000; Referee: (Spain) Manuel Díaz Vega

31-05-1992 (United States) 1992 U.S. Cup	Italy	0 – 0	Portugal	(United States) Yale Bowl, New Haven
				Attendance: 40,000; Referee: (United States) Raúl Domínguez

03-06-1992 (United States) 1992 U.S. Cup	United States	1 – 0	Portugal	(United States) Soldier Field, Chicago
	Roy Wegerle 35'			Attendance: 10,402; Referee: (Italy) Angelo Amendolia

07-06-1992 (United States) 1992 U.S. Cup	Portugal	0 – 2	Republic of Ireland	(United States) Foxboro Stadium, Foxborough
			39' Steve Staunton; 89' Tommy Coyne	Attendance: 41,227; Referee: (United States) Helder Dias

02-09-1992 Friendly	Austria	1 – 1	Portugal	(Austria) Linzer Stadion, Linz
	Toni Polster 37'		56' Hélder Cristóvão	Attendance: 14,000; Referee: (Poland) Piotr Werner

14-10-1992 (United States) 1994 W.C. Q	Scotland	0 – 0	Portugal	(Scotland) Ibrox Stadium, Glasgow
				Attendance: 22,583; Referee: (Austria) Hubert Forstinger

11-11-1992 Friendly	Portugal	2 – 1	Bulgaria	(France) Stade de Paris, Saint-Ouen
	Luís Figo 32'; Oceano da Cruz 56'		26' Krasimir Balakov	Attendance: 12,000; Referee: (France) Alain Sars

=== 1993 ===
24-01-1993 (United States) 1994 W.C. Q	Malta	0 – 1	Portugal	(Malta) Ta' Qali National Stadium, Ta' Qali
			58' Rui Águas	Attendance: 11,500; Referee: (England) David Elleray

10-02-1993 Friendly	Portugal	1 – 1	Norway	(Portugal) Estádio de São Luís, Faro
	Oceano da Cruz 56'		87' Gøran Sørloth	Attendance: 15,000; Referee: (Spain) Anton Martín Navarrete

24-02-1993 (United States) 1994 W.C. Q	Portugal	1 – 3	Italy	(Portugal) Estádio das Antas, Porto
	Fernando Couto 56'		2' Roberto Baggio; 25' Pierluigi Casiraghi; 73' Dino Baggio	Attendance: 30,761; Referee: (Sweden) Bo Karlsson

31-03-1993 (United States) 1994 W.C. Q	Switzerland	1 – 1	Portugal	(Switzerland) Wankdorf Stadium, Bern
	Stéphane Chapuisat 39'		44' José Semedo	Attendance: 29,095; Referee: (Denmark) Kim Milton Nielsen

28-04-1993 (United States) 1994 W.C. Q	Portugal	5 – 0	Scotland	(Portugal) Estádio da Luz (1954), Lisbon
	Rui Barros 5', 70'; Jorge Cadete 45', 72'; Paulo Futre 67'			Attendance: 28,000; Referee: (Hungary) Sándor Puhl

19-06-1993 (United States) 1994 W.C. Q	Portugal	4 – 0	Malta	(Portugal) Estádio do Bessa, Porto
	Nogueira dos Santos 1'; Rui Costa 8'; João Vieira Pinto 23'; Jorge Cadete 85'			Attendance: 10,000; Referee: (Czech Republic) Jiří Ulrich

05-09-1993 (United States) 1994 W.C. Q	Estonia	0 – 2	Portugal	(Estonia) Kadrioru Stadium, Tallinn
			61' Rui Costa; 74' António Folha	Attendance: 2,750; Referee: (Finland) Ilkka Koho

13-10-1993 (United States) 1994 W.C. Q	Portugal	1 – 0	Switzerland	(Portugal) Estádio das Antas, Porto
	João Vieira Pinto 8'			Attendance: 55,000; Referee: (Germany) Hellmut Krug

10-11-1993 (United States) 1994 W.C. Q	Portugal	3 – 0	Estonia	(Portugal) Estádio da Luz (1954), Lisbon
	Paulo Futre 2'; Oceano da Cruz 37' (pen.); Rui Águas 86'			Attendance: 105,000; Referee: (Belgium) Eric Blareau

17-11-1993 (United States) 1994 W.C. Q	Italy	1 – 0	Portugal	(Italy) San Siro, Milan
	Dino Baggio 83'			Attendance: 71,513; Referee: (Poland) Ryszard Wójcik

=== 1994 ===
19-01-1994 Friendly	Spain	2 – 2	Portugal	(Spain) Balaídos, Vigo
	Julio Salinas 42'; Juanele 76'		72' (o.g.) Juanma López; 83' (pen.) Oceano da Cruz	Attendance: 32,000; Referee: (Italy) Fabio Baldas

20-04-1994 Friendly	Norway	0 – 0	Portugal	(Norway) Ullevaal Stadion, Oslo
				Attendance: 17,509; Referee: (Scotland) Andrew Waddell

07-09-1994 (England) 1996 EURO Q	Northern Ireland	1 – 2	Portugal	(Northern Ireland) Windsor Park, Belfast
	Jimmy Quinn 58' (pen.)		8' Rui Costa; 81' Domingos Paciência	Attendance: 6,000; Referee: (Norway) Rune Pedersen

09-10-1994 (England) 1996 EURO Q	Latvia	1 – 3	Portugal	(Latvia) Daugava Stadium, Riga
	Aleksejs Šarando 87'		33', 72' João Vieira Pinto; 73' Luís Figo	Attendance: 5,400; Referee: (Belgium) Eric Blareau

13-11-1994 (England) 1996 EURO Q	Portugal	1 – 0	Austria	(Portugal) Estádio José Alvalade (1956), Lisbon
	Luís Figo 36'			Attendance: 46,000; Referee: (Denmark) Peter Mikkelsen

18-12-1994 (England) 1996 EURO Q	Portugal	8 – 0	Liechtenstein	(Portugal) Estádio da Luz (1954), Lisbon
	Domingos Paciência 2', 11'; Oceano da Cruz 45'; João Vieira Pinto 56'; Fernando Couto 72'; António Folha 74'; Paulo Alves 75', 79'			Attendance: 22,800; Referee: (Czech Republic) Lubomír Puček

=== 1995 ===
26-01-1995 (Canada) SkyDome Cup	Canada	1 – 1	Portugal	(Canada) SkyDome, Toronto
	Alex Bunbury 82'		10' António Folha	Attendance: 13,658; Referee: (United States) Zimmerman Boulos

29-01-1995 (Canada) SkyDome Cup	Portugal	1 – 0	Denmark League	(Canada) SkyDome, Toronto
	Paulo Alves 89'			Attendance: 23,700; Referee: (Canada) Tony Camacho

22-02-1995 Friendly	Netherlands	0 – 1	Portugal	(Netherlands) Philips Stadion, Eindhoven
			8' Pedro Barbosa	Attendance: 25,300; Referee: (France) Gilles Veissière

26-04-1995 (England) 1996 EURO Q	Republic of Ireland	1 – 0	Portugal	(Republic of Ireland) Lansdowne Road, Dublin
	Vítor Baía 44' (o.g.)			Attendance: 33,500; Referee: (Sweden) Christer Fällström

03-06-1995 (England) 1996 EURO Q	Portugal	3 – 2	Latvia	(Portugal) Estádio das Antas, Porto
	Luís Figo 5'; Carlos Secretário 19'; Domingos Paciência 21'		50', 73' Vīts Rimkus	Attendance: 40,000; Referee: (Serbia and Montenegro) Zoran Petrović

15-08-1995 (England) 1996 EURO Q	Liechtenstein	0 – 7	Portugal	(Liechtenstein) Sportpark Eschen-Mauren, Eschen
			25' Domingos Paciência; 33' Paulinho Santos; 47', 77' Rui Costa; 67', 73', 90' Paulo Alves	Attendance: 3,500; Referee: (Croatia) Dragutin Poljak

03-09-1995 (England) 1996 EURO Q	Portugal	1 – 1	Northern Ireland	(Portugal) Estádio das Antas, Porto
	Domingos Paciência 47'		66' Michael Hughes	Attendance: 26,780; Referee: (France) Rémi Harrel

11-10-1995 (England) 1996 EURO Q	Austria	1 – 1	Portugal	(Austria) Ernst-Happel-Stadion, Vienna
	Peter Stöger 21'		49' Paulinho Santos	Attendance: 44,000; Referee: (Russia) Nikolai Levnikov

15-11-1995 (England) 1996 EURO Q	Portugal	3 – 0	Republic of Ireland	(Portugal) Estádio da Luz (1954), Lisbon
	Rui Costa 60'; Hélder Cristóvão 74'; Jorge Cadete 89'			Attendance: 71,766; Referee: (Italy) Piero Ceccarini

12-12-1995 Friendly	England	1 – 1	Portugal	(England) Wembley Stadium (1923), London
	Steve Stone 44'		58' Paulo Alves	Attendance: 28,592; Referee: (Norway) Rune Pedersen

=== 1996 ===
24-01-1996 Friendly	France	3 – 2	Portugal	(France) Parc des Princes, Paris
	Youri Djorkaeff 24', 75'; Reynald Pedros 77'		22' Fernando Couto; 30' Rui Costa	Attendance: 25,000; Referee: (England) Dermot Gallagher

21-02-1996 Friendly	Portugal	1 – 2	Germany	(Portugal) Estádio das Antas, Porto
	António Folha 52'		14', 65' Andreas Möller	Attendance: 18,000; Referee: (Italy) Robert Boggi

27-03-1996 Friendly	Portugal	1 – 0	Greece	(Portugal) Estádio do Restelo, Lisbon
	Oceano da Cruz 86' (pen.)			Attendance: 8,500; Referee: (England) Mike Reed

29-05-1996 Friendly	Republic of Ireland	0 – 1	Portugal	(Republic of Ireland) Lansdowne Road, Dublin
			39' António Folha	Attendance: 26,576; Referee: (Switzerland) Claude Détruche

09-06-1996 (England) 1996 EURO GS	Denmark	1 – 1	Portugal	(England) Hillsborough Stadium, Sheffield
19:30 WET	Brian Laudrup 22'		53' Sá Pinto	Attendance: 34,993; Referee: (Netherlands) Mario van der Ende

14-06-1996 (England) 1996 EURO GS	Portugal	1 – 0	Turkey	(England) City Ground, Nottingham
16:30 WET	Fernando Couto 64'			Attendance: 22,670; Referee: (Hungary) Sándor Puhl

19-06-1996 (England) 1996 EURO GS	Croatia	0 – 3	Portugal	(England) City Ground, Nottingham
16:30 WET			3' Luís Figo; 33' João Vieira Pinto; 82' Domingos Paciência	Attendance: 20,484; Referee: (Germany) Bernd Heynemann

23-06-1996 (England) 1996 EURO 1/4	Czech Republic	1 – 0	Portugal	(England) Villa Park, Birmingham
18:30 WET	Karel Poborský 53'			Attendance: 26,832; Referee: (Germany) Hellmut Krug

31-08-1996 (France) 1998 W.C. Q	Armenia	0 – 0	Portugal	(Armenia) Hrazdan Stadium, Yerevan
				Attendance: 6,015; Referee: (Slovakia) Karol Ihring

05-10-1996 (France) 1998 W.C. Q	Ukraine	2 – 1	Portugal	(Ukraine) Olimpiysky National Sports Complex, Kyiv
	Serhiy Popov 4'; Yuriy Maksymov 88'		83' João Vieira Pinto	Attendance: 51,395; Referee: (Denmark) Kim Milton Nielsen

09-10-1996 (France) 1998 W.C. Q	Albania	0 – 3	Portugal	(Albania) Qemal Stafa Stadium, Tirana
			10' Luís Figo; 75' Hélder Cristóvão; 88' Rui Costa	Attendance: 16,000; Referee: (Turkey) Oğuz Sarvan

09-11-1996 (France) 1998 W.C. Q	Portugal	1 – 0	Ukraine	(Portugal) Estádio das Antas, Porto
	Fernando Couto 57'			Attendance: 19,106; Referee: (Sweden) Leif Sundell

14-11-1996 (France) 1998 W.C. Q	Portugal	0 – 0	Germany	(Portugal) Estádio da Luz (1954), Lisbon
				Attendance: 50,000; Referee: (Hungary) Sándor Puhl

=== 1997 ===
22-01-1997 Friendly	Portugal	0 – 2	France	(Portugal) Estádio Primeiro de Maio, Braga
			10' Didier Deschamps; 62' Ibrahim Ba	Attendance: 40,000; Referee: (Spain) José Núñez

19-02-1997 Friendly	Greece	0 – 0	Portugal	(Greece) Nikos Goumas Stadium, Athens
				Attendance: 1,500; Referee: (Romania) Aron Huzu

29-03-1997 (France) 1998 W.C. Q	Northern Ireland	0 – 0	Portugal	(Northern Ireland) Windsor Park, Belfast
				Attendance: 10,500; Referee: (Italy) Graziano Cesari

07-06-1997 (France) 1998 W.C. Q	Portugal	2 – 0	Albania	(Portugal) Estádio das Antas, Porto
	João Vieira Pinto 14'; Luís Figo 71'			Attendance: 25,000; Referee: (Norway) Terje Hauge

20-08-1997 (France) 1998 W.C. Q	Portugal	3 – 1	Armenia	(Portugal) Estádio do Bonfim, Setúbal
	Domingos Paciência 23'; Luís Figo 31'; Pedro Barbosa 55'		46' Éric Assadourian	Attendance: 16,000; Referee: (Romania) Marcel Lică

06-09-1997 (France) 1998 W.C. Q	Germany	1 – 1	Portugal	(Germany) Olympic Stadium, Berlin
	Ulf Kirsten 81'		71' Pedro Barbosa	Attendance: 75,800; Referee: (France) Marc Batta

11-10-1997 (France) 1998 W.C. Q	Portugal	1 – 0	Northern Ireland	(Portugal) Estádio da Luz (1954), Lisbon
	Sérgio Conceição 18'			Attendance: 25,000; Referee: (Denmark) Peter Mikkelsen

=== 1998 ===
22-04-1998 Friendly	England	3 – 0	Portugal	(England) Wembley Stadium (1923), London
	Alan Shearer 5', 65'; Teddy Sheringham 46'			Attendance: 63,463; Referee: (Spain) Manuel Díaz Vega

19-08-1998 Friendly	Portugal	2 – 1	Mozambique	(Portugal) Estádio de São Miguel, Ponta Delgada
	Rui Costa 55', 58'	Report	77' Artur	Attendance: 15,000; Referee: (France) Stéphane Bré

06-09-1998 (Belgium) (Netherlands) 2000 EURO Q	Hungary	1 – 3	Portugal	(Hungary) Népstadion, Budapest
	Ferenc Horváth 32'	Report	55', 75' Sá Pinto; 84' Rui Costa	Attendance: 50,000; Referee: (Switzerland) Urs Meier

10-10-1998 (Belgium) (Netherlands) 2000 EURO Q	Portugal	0 – 1	Romania	(Portugal) Estádio das Antas, Porto
		Report	90' Dorinel Munteanu	Attendance: 50,000; Referee: (Germany) Hellmut Krug

14-10-1998 (Belgium) (Netherlands) 2000 EURO Q	Slovakia	0 – 3	Portugal	(Slovakia) Tehelné pole, Bratislava
		Report	17', 30' João Vieira Pinto; 70' Abel Xavier	Attendance: 22,059; Referee: (Turkey) Oğuz Sarvan

18-11-1998 Friendly	Portugal	2 – 0	Israel	(Portugal) Estádio do Bonfim, Setúbal
	Fernando Couto 6'; Simão Sabrosa 89'	Report		Attendance: 13,000; Referee: (Netherlands) Rolf Luinge

=== 1999 ===
10-02-1999 Friendly	Portugal	0 – 0	Netherlands	(France) Parc des Princes, Paris
		Report		Attendance: 25,000; Referee: (France) Claude Colombo

26-03-1999 (Belgium) (Netherlands) 2000 EURO Q	Portugal	7 – 0	Azerbaijan	(Portugal) Estádio D. Afonso Henriques, Guimarães
	Sá Pinto 28'; João Vieira Pinto 36', 77'; Paulo Madeira 67'; Sérgio Conceição 76'; Pedro Pauleta 82', 83'	Report		Attendance: 14,650; Referee: (Poland) Jacek Granat

31-03-1999 (Belgium) (Netherlands) 2000 EURO Q	Liechtenstein	0 – 5	Portugal	(Liechtenstein) Rheinpark Stadion, Vaduz
		Report	16' (pen.), 79' Rui Costa; 49' Luís Figo; 54', 60' Paulo Madeira	Attendance: 3,548; Referee: (Iceland) Gylfi Thór Orrason

05-06-1999 (Belgium) (Netherlands) 2000 EURO Q	Portugal	1 – 0	Slovakia	(Portugal) Estádio José Alvalade (1956), Lisbon
	Nuno Capucho 64'	Report		Attendance: 20,300; Referee: (Denmark) Claus Bo Larsen

09-06-1999 (Belgium) (Netherlands) 2000 EURO Q	Portugal	8 – 0	Liechtenstein	(Portugal) Estádio Municipal de Coimbra, Coimbra
	Sá Pinto 29', 45'; João Vieira Pinto 40', 59', 67'; Christof Ritter 52' (o.g.); Rui Costa 80', 90'	Report		Attendance: 14,020; Referee: (Austria) Dietmar Drabek

18-08-1999 Friendly	Portugal	4 – 0	Andorra	(Portugal) Estádio Nacional, Lisbon
	Rui Costa 17'; João Vieira Pinto 36'; Luís Figo 45'; Pedro Pauleta 68'	Report		Attendance: 7,000; Referee: (France) Bruno Coué

04-09-1999 (Belgium) (Netherlands) 2000 EURO Q	Azerbaijan	1 – 1	Portugal	(Azerbaijan) Tofiq Bahramov Stadium, Baku
	Zaur Tagizade 51'	Report	90' Luís Figo	Attendance: 8,000; Referee: (England) Dermot Gallagher

08-09-1999 (Belgium) (Netherlands) 2000 EURO Q	Romania	1 – 1	Portugal	(Romania) Stadionul Steaua, Bucharest
	Gheorghe Hagi 37'	Report	45' Luís Figo	Attendance: 28,000; Referee: (Germany) Helmut Strampe

09-10-1999 (Belgium) (Netherlands) 2000 EURO Q	Portugal	3 – 0	Hungary	(Portugal) Estádio da Luz (1954), Lisbon
	Rui Costa 14' (pen.); João Vieira Pinto 16'; Abel Xavier 57'	Report		Attendance: 65,000; Referee: (Denmark) Kim Milton Nielsen
