= 1994 Supertaça Cândido de Oliveira =

- Event: Supertaça Cândido de Oliveira (Portuguese Super Cup)
Benfica	Porto
0	1
- Porto won the replay 1–0, after 1–1 aggregate score over the two legs.

First leg
Benfica	Porto
1	1
- Date: 24 August 1994
- Venue: Estádio da Luz, Lisbon
- Referee: Carlos Calheiros (Viana do Castelo)

Second leg
Porto	Benfica
0	0
- Date: 21 September 1994
- Venue: Estádio das Antas, Porto
- Referee: Donato Ramos (Viseu)

The 1994 Supertaça Cândido de Oliveira was the 16th edition of the Supertaça Cândido de Oliveira, the annual Portuguese football season-opening match contested by the winners of the previous season's top league and cup competitions (or cup runner-up in case the league- and cup-winning club is the same). The 1994 Supertaça Cândido de Oliveira was contested over two legs, and opposed Benfica and Porto of the Primeira Liga. Benfica qualified for the SuperCup by winning the 1993–94 Primeira Divisão, whilst Porto qualified for the Supertaça by winning the 1993–94 Taça de Portugal.

The first leg which took place at the Estádio da Luz, saw 1–1 result as Rui Filipe scored for Porto and Vítor Paneira for Benfica. The second leg which took place at the Estádio das Antas finished goalless (1–1 on aggregate), which led to the Supertaça being replayed in June 1995. The replay which took place at Paris Saint-Germain's Parc des Princes in France, saw the Dragões defeat the Encarnados 1–0 thanks to Domingos Paciência goal which would claim the Portistas an eighth Supertaça.

== First leg ==
=== Details ===
24 August 1994

Benfica	1–1	Porto
Paneira 75'		Rui Filipe 72'

Estádio da Luz, Lisbon
Referee: Carlos Calheiros (Viana do Castelo)

Benfica	Porto

GK	1	(Belgium) Michel Preud'homme
RB	4	(Portugal) Paulo Madeira
CB	5	(Portugal) Abel Xavier	(yellow card) 21' (yellow-red card) 35'
CB	3	(Portugal) Hélder
CB	6	(Brazil) Paulão	(yellow card) 22'
LB	2	(Portugal) António Veloso (c)		(substituted off) 27'
RM	7	(Portugal) Vítor Paneira	(yellow card) 90'
CM	10	(Portugal) José Tavares
CM	9	(Portugal) Nelo	(red card) 80'
LM	8	(Portugal) João Pinto	(yellow card) 26' (yellow-red card) 89'
CF	11	(Portugal) César Brito		(substituted off) 45'
Substitutes:
GK		(Portugal) Neno
DF		(Portugal) Pedro Henriques
DF		(Brazil) William
FW		(Brazil) Clóvis		(substituted on) 45'
FW		(Brazil) Edílson		(substituted on) 27'
Manager:
(Portugal) Artur Jorge

GK	1	(Portugal) Vítor Baía
RB	2	(Portugal) João Pinto (c)
CB	4	(Brazil) Aloísio	(yellow card) 56'
CB	3	(Brazil) Zé Carlos
LB	7	(Portugal) Carlos Secretário	(red card) 19'
DM	5	(Brazil) Emerson
RM	8	(Portugal) Rui Filipe	(red card) 80'
CM	6	(Portugal) António André	(yellow card) 81'	(substituted off) 85'
CM	10	(Portugal) Paulinho Santos	(yellow card) 43'
LM	11	(Portugal) António Folha
CF	9	(Bulgaria) Emil Kostadinov		(substituted off) 67'
Substitutes:
GK		(Portugal) Cândido Rego
DF		(Portugal) Jorge Costa
DF		(Portugal) Rui Jorge		(substituted on) 85'
MF		(Federal Republic of Yugoslavia) Ljubinko Drulović		(substituted on) 67'
FW		(Portugal) Domingos
Manager:
(England) Bobby Robson

Match officials

- Assistant referees:
- Fourth official:

Match rules

- 90 minutes.
- Maximum of two substitutions

== Second leg ==
=== Details ===
21 September 1994

Porto	0–0	Benfica

Estádio das Antas, Porto
Referee: Donato Ramos (Viseu)

Porto	Benfica

GK	1	(Portugal) Vítor Baía
RB	2	(Portugal) João Pinto (c)
CB	4	(Brazil) Aloísio	(yellow card) 68'
CB	3	(Brazil) Zé Carlos
LB	7	(Portugal) Carlos Secretário
DM	5	(Brazil) Emerson
DM	6	(Russia) Vasili Kulkov	(yellow card) 17'
CM	11	(Portugal) Paulinho Santos
AM	10	(Portugal) Rui Barros		(substituted off) 65'
CF	9	(Russia) Sergei Yuran
CF	8	(Federal Republic of Yugoslavia) Ljubinko Drulović		(substituted off) 75'
Substitutes:
GK		(Portugal) Cândido Rego
DF		(Portugal) Jorge Costa
DF		(Portugal) Rui Jorge
FW		(Portugal) Domingos		(substituted on) 65'
FW		(Peru) Ronald Baroni		(substituted on) 75'
Manager:
(England) Bobby Robson

GK	1	(Belgium) Michel Preud'homme	(yellow card) 41'
RB	4	(Portugal) Paulo Madeira
CB	6	(Brazil) Paulão	(yellow card) 90'
CB	5	(Portugal) Abel Xavier
CB	2	(Portugal) António Veloso (c)
LB	3	(Portugal) Dimas
RM	10	(Portugal) Jorge Amaral
CM	7	(Portugal) José Tavares
CM	9	(Portugal) Nelo
LM	8	(Portugal) João Pinto		(substituted off) 83'
CF	11	(Brazil) Isaías	(yellow card) 46'	(substituted off) 75'
Substitutes:
GK		(Portugal) Neno
DF		(Brazil) William
DF		(Portugal) Daniel Kenedy		(substituted on) 75'
FW		(Portugal) César Brito		(substituted on) 83'
FW		(Brazil) Clóvis
Manager:
(Portugal) Artur Jorge

== Replay ==
=== Details ===
20 June 1995

Porto	1–0	Benfica
Domingos 51'

Parc des Princes, Paris
Referee: Lucílio Batista (Setúbal)

Porto	Benfica

GK	1	(Portugal) Vítor Baía
RB	7	(Portugal) Carlos Secretário
CB	4	(Brazil) Aloísio (c)
CB	3	(Brazil) Zé Carlos	(yellow card) 70'
LB	2	(Portugal) Fernando Bandeirinha	(yellow card) 25'
DM	5	(Brazil) Emerson
DM	6	(Russia) Vasili Kulkov		(substituted off) 77'
RM	10	(Portugal) Rui Barros		(substituted off) 85'
CM	8	(Portugal) Paulinho Santos
LM	11	(Portugal) António Folha
CF	9	(Portugal) Domingos
Substitutes:
MF		(Portugal) José Semedo		(substituted on) 85'
MF		(Trinidad and Tobago) Russell Latapy		(substituted on) 77'
Manager:
(England) Bobby Robson

GK	1	(Portugal) Neno
DF	6	(Brazil) Paulo Pereira	(yellow card) 57'
DF	5	(Portugal) Abel Xavier
DF	2	(Portugal) Hélder
DF	4	(Portugal) Paulo Madeira
MF	10	(Portugal) António Veloso (c)		(substituted off) 65'
MF	9	(Portugal) Daniel Kenedy	(yellow card) 65'
DF	3	(Portugal) Dimas
FW	11	(Croatia) Mario Stanić
MF	8	(Portugal) José Tavares		(substituted off) 45'
MF	7	(Portugal) Paulo Bento
Substitutes:
FW		(Angola) Akwá		(substituted on) 45'
FW		(Portugal) Edgar		(substituted on) 65'
Manager:
(Portugal) Artur Jorge

Match officials

- Assistant referees:
- Fourth official:

Match rules

- 90 minutes.
- 30 minutes of extra time if necessary.
- Penalty shoot-out if scores still level.
- Maximum of two substitutions

1994 Supertaça Cândido de Oliveira Winners
Porto
8th Title

== See also ==
- O Clássico
- 1994–95 Primeira Divisão
- 1994–95 Taça de Portugal
- 1994–95 S.L. Benfica season
