= Domingos Paciência =

Portuguese football manager and former player (born 1969)

Domingos
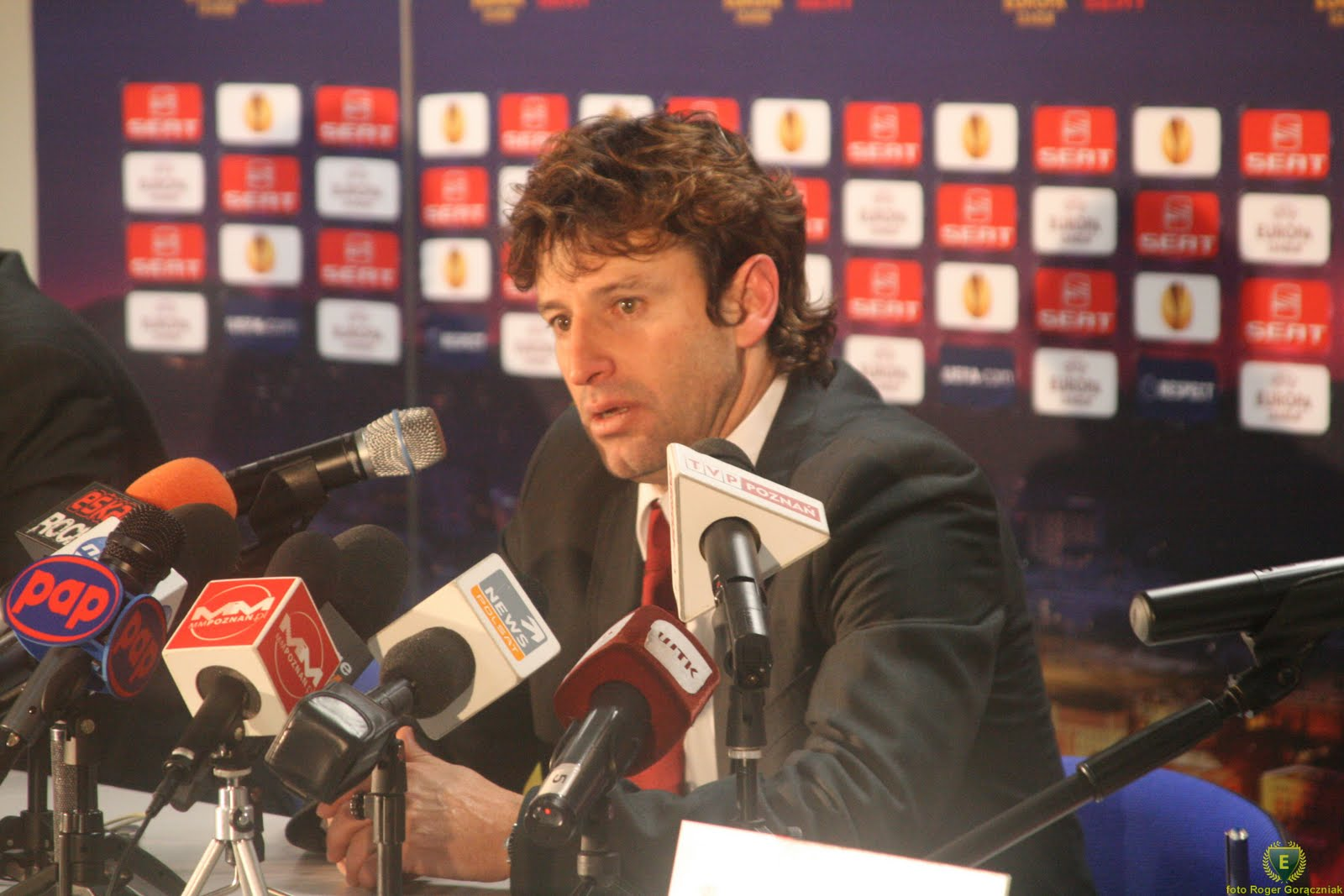
- Paciência as Braga manager in 2011

Personal information
- Full name: Domingos José Paciência Oliveira
- Date of birth: 2 January 1969 (age 57)
- Place of birth: Leça da Palmeira, Portugal
- Height: 1.74 m (5 ft 9 in)
- Position: Striker

Youth career
- 1980–1982: Académica Leça
- 1982–1987: Porto

Senior career*
Years	Team	Apps	(Gls)
1987–1997	Porto	232	(96)
1997–1999	Tenerife	50	(6)
1999–2001	Porto	31	(9)
Total		313	(111)

International career
1986	Portugal U18	2	(0)
1987–1988	Portugal U21	5	(0)
1989–1998	Portugal	34	(9)

Managerial career
- 2001–2004: Porto B (assistant)
- 2004–2005: Porto B
- 2006–2007: União Leiria
- 2007–2009: Académica
- 2009–2011: Braga
- 2011–2012: Sporting CP
- 2013: Deportivo La Coruña
- 2014: Kayserispor
- 2014–2015: Vitória Setúbal
- 2015: APOEL
- 2017–2018: Belenenses
- * Club domestic league appearances and goals

Domingos José Paciência Oliveira, known simply as Domingos as a player (Portuguese pronunciation: [duˈmĩɡuʃ]; born 2 January 1969), is a Portuguese former professional footballer who played as a striker. He is currently a manager.

He achieved success with both Porto and the Portugal national team, appearing in 380 official matches with the former over 12 seasons (nearly 150 goals) and representing the latter at Euro 1996.

After completing his accreditation in 2005, Domingos resumed his career as a manager, notably helping Braga reach the 2011 Europa League final.

== Playing career ==
A Porto trainee since he was 13, Domingos was born in Leça da Palmeira, Matosinhos, and proved to be an above-average scorer despite being physically weak. Tomislav Ivić eventually decided he should be the replacement for an ageing Fernando Gomes, and made his debut with the first team at age 19, being crowned top scorer in the Primeira Liga in the 1995–96 season. Previously, in 1990–91, he was involved in a last-matchday battle for the Bola de Prata award with Benfica's Rui Águas, with Águas' team having won the championship the game before: Domingos played first, putting four past Vitória de Guimarães in a 5–0 home win, going from 20 to 24 goals. Águas appeared hours later against Beira-Mar, and scored two second-half goals in an eventual 3–0 victory, finishing with 25.

In 1997–98, Domingos moved to the Canary Islands' Tenerife, one year after Porto signed prolific striker Mário Jardel. There, he teamed up with Roy Makaay, but never fully adapted to La Liga, netting only once in his final season – which ended in relegation– in a 1–2 home loss to Alavés.

Domingos eventually returned to Porto two years later, who outbid Sporting CP at the eleventh hour. While cherished by the crowd, he did not impose himself as in the past, and retired at the end of the 2000–01 campaign. He won seven league titles, five cups and four supercups.

With Portugal, Domingos scored nine goals in 34 appearances, including one against Croatia at UEFA Euro 1996 as the national team reached the quarter-finals.

== Coaching career ==
=== Leiria and Académica ===
After his retirement, Paciência was assigned to coach Porto's youth teams, and later the reserves. After completing his level three managing course, he was hired as manager of União de Leiria for 2006–07. He also opened a football school in Matosinhos, with his former Porto teammate Rui Barros.

Despite a good work overall, leading the team to a seventh-place finish in the top flight, Paciência left the club before the end of the season after having fallen out with its president and player Adriano Rossato. The following campaign, he took the reins of fellow top-tier Académica de Coimbra after Manuel Machado resigned.

In his first two years in charge of the Students, Paciência led them to two consecutive league wins at Benfica (3–0, 1–0). In his second season, he achieved a seventh place, their best in 24 years.

=== Braga ===
In June 2009, Paciência resigned after receiving an offer from Braga which had just lost manager Jorge Jesus to Benfica. In his debut campaign, despite a bad start which included being knocked out of the UEFA Europa League in the third qualifying round by IF Elfsborg, he guided the Minho side as they led the league for several months and eventually secured the second position – a best ever, behind Benfica – and subsequent qualification for the UEFA Champions League; the team became only the fifth in the country to reach the competition's group stage, after ousting Celtic (4–2 on aggregate) and Sevilla (5–3) in the qualifying rounds.

After a bad start to both the domestic and the Champions League campaigns, Braga slowly recovered their form, finishing fourth in the former and third in the latter, thus qualifying for the Europa League where Paciência led them to the final after disposing of Lech Poznań, Liverpool, Dynamo Kyiv and Benfica; as he had announced in May 2011, he left his post after the game against Porto.

=== Sporting CP ===
On 23 May 2011, Paciência was named José Couceiro's successor at Sporting. His move to Lisbon was largely expected following the election of Luís Godinho Lopes as club president.

In the first season, Paciência qualified the Lions for their first Portuguese Cup final in four years. On 13 February 2012, however, as the team ranked fourth in the league, 16 points behind leaders Benfica, he was fired following a 2–0 away loss against Marítimo.

=== Deportivo ===
On 30 December 2012, Paciência signed a contract with Spanish top division club Deportivo de La Coruña, as the Galicians struggled at the bottom of the table. In his first game in charge, his team beat Málaga 1–0 at home to mark their first win in over two months.

Paciência resigned on 10 February 2013, after not being able to improve from the 20th and last position in the charts.

=== Kayserispor ===
On 17 January 2014, Paciência was named as the new manager of Kayserispor, succeeding Robert Prosinečki. His debut occurred nine days later, in a 3–0 Süper Lig loss at Sivasspor.

After a poor run of results, which saw the club record only one win in seven matches, Paciência was sacked on 17 March 2014.

=== Vitória Setúbal ===
On 22 May 2014, Paciência returned to Portugal to take over Vitória de Setúbal as a replacement for Couceiro. He was relieved of his duties on 19 January of the following year.

=== APOEL ===
On 21 May 2015, Paciência agreed terms with reigning Cypriot champions APOEL, replacing Thorsten Fink who was fired on 11 May at the conclusion of the season. After only three months in charge, his contract was terminated following failure to reach the group stage of the UEFA Champions League after being eliminated by Astana, as well as defeat in the Cypriot Super Cup to AEL Limassol.

=== Belenenses ===
Paciência was appointed at Belenenses on 20 April 2017, signing until June 2018 and eventually leading the side to 14th place in the top flight. In January of that year, however, he left by mutual agreement and was replaced by former club player Silas.

== Personal life ==
Paciência's son, Gonçalo, is also a footballer and a forward. He too was developed by Porto.

== Career statistics ==
=== Club ===
Club	Season	League		Cup		Europe		Other		Total	
Club	Season	Apps	Goals	Apps	Goals	Apps	Goals	Apps	Goals	Apps	Goals
Porto	1987–88	8	1	4	0	0	0	—		12	1
Porto	1988–89	26	5	4	0	1	1	2	0	33	6
Porto	1989–90	13	1	2	0	6	0	—		22	1
Porto	1990–91	34	24	6	5	4	2	0	0	44	31
Porto	1991–92	24	4	6	2	2	0	3	0	35	6
Porto	1992–93	30	9	3	0	9	2	2	0	44	11
Porto	1993–94	20	6	4	3	8	3	1	1	33	13
Porto	1994–95	32	19	3	3	6	3	2	1	43	26
Porto	1995–96	29	25	9	4	6	0	3	2	47	31
Porto	1996–97	16	2	2	2	0	0	1	1	19	5
Porto	Total	232	96	43	19	42	11	14	5	331	131
Tenerife	1997–98	31	5	1	0	—				32	5
Tenerife	1998–99	19	1			—				19	1
Tenerife	Total	50	6	1	0	—				51	6
Porto	1999–2000	21	6	3	1	7	0	2	1	33	8
Porto	2000–01	10	3	2	0	3	0	1	0	16	3
Porto	Total	31	9	5	1	10	0	3	1	49	11
Career total		313	111	49	20	52	11	17	6	431	148

=== International goals ===
Domingos – goals for Portugal
#	Date	Venue	Opponent	Score	Result	Competition
1.	19 December 1990	Estádio Municipal Dr. José Vieira de Carvalho, Maia, Portugal	United States	1–0	1–0	Friendly
2.	7 September 1994	Windsor Park, Belfast, Northern Ireland	Northern Ireland	1–2	1–2	Euro 1996 qualifying
3.	18 December 1994	Estádio da Luz (1954), Lisbon, Portugal	Liechtenstein	1–0	8–0	Euro 1996 qualifying
4.	18 December 1994	Estádio da Luz (1954), Lisbon, Portugal	Liechtenstein	2–0	8–0	Euro 1996 qualifying
5.	3 June 1995	Estádio das Antas, Porto, Portugal	Latvia	3–0	3–2	Euro 1996 qualifying
6.	15 August 1995	Sportpark Eschen-Mauren, Eschen, Liechtenstein	Liechtenstein	0–1	0–7	Euro 1996 qualifying
7.	3 September 1995	Estádio das Antas, Porto, Portugal	Northern Ireland	1–0	1–1	Euro 1996 qualifying
8.	19 June 1996	City Ground, Nottingham, England	Croatia	0–3	0–3	UEFA Euro 1996
9.	20 August 1997	Estádio do Bonfim, Setúbal, Portugal	Armenia	1–0	3–1	1998 World Cup qualification

== Managerial statistics ==
As of 26 August 2015

Managerial record by team and tenure
Team	From	To	Record				
Team	From	To	G	W	D	L	Win %
Porto B	20 May 2004	27 May 2005	38	20	6	12	52.63
União Leiria	18 May 2006	30 March 2007	24	9	6	9	37.50
Académica	12 September 2007	26 May 2009	65	19	24	22	29.23
Braga	23 June 2009	19 May 2011	93	51	16	26	54.84
Sporting CP	23 May 2011	13 February 2012	35	19	9	7	54.29
Deportivo La Coruña	30 December 2012	11 February 2013	6	1	1	4	16.67
Kayserispor	17 January 2014	17 March 2014	7	1	1	5	14.29
Vitória Setúbal	22 May 2014	19 January 2015	20	5	3	12	25.00
APOEL	21 May 2015	28 August 2015	8	2	4	2	25.00
Belenenses	18 April 2017	16 January 2018	28	6	8	14	21.43
Total			324	133	78	113	41.05

== Honours ==
=== Player ===
==== Club ====
Porto

- Primeira Liga: 1987–88, 1989–90, 1991–92, 1992–93, 1994–95, 1995–96, 1996–97
- Taça de Portugal: 1987–88, 1990–91, 1993–94, 1999–2000, 2000–01
- Supertaça Cândido de Oliveira: 1991, 1994, 1996, 1999

==== Individual ====
- Portuguese Footballer of the Year: 1990
- Portuguese Golden Ball: 1990
- Primeira Liga top scorer: 1995–96

=== Manager ===
- UEFA Europa League runner-up: 2010–11

== See also ==
- List of association football families
