= Filgueira (disambiguation) =

Filgueira may refer to:

== Middle name ==
- Xosé Filgueira Valverde (1906–1996), Spanish writer

== Surname ==
- Edinaldo Filgueira (1975–2011), Brazilian blogger and journalist
- Gastón Filgueira (born 1986), Uruguayan former footballer
- Luís Carlos Filgueira (born 1967), Brazilian football coach
