= Paulo Gomes =

Paulo Gomes may refer to:

== Football ==
- Paulo Gomes (footballer, born 1970), Paulo Jorge dos Santos Gomes, Portuguese midfielder
- Paulo Gomes (footballer, born 4 March 1975), Paulo Jorge Sousa Gomes, Portuguese football manager and midfielder
- Paulo Gomes (footballer, born 31 March 1975), Carlos Paulo Cardoso Gomes Caçote, Portuguese football manager and midfielder
- Paulo Jorge (footballer, born 1980), Paulo Jorge Soares Gomes, Portuguese centre-back

== Other sports ==
- Paulo Gomes (racing driver) (born 1948), Brazilian racing driver
- Paulo Gomes (athlete) (born 1973), Portuguese Olympic long-distance runner
