= Manuel Matias =

Manuel Matias may refer to:

- Manuel Matias (runner) (born 1962), Portuguese runner
- Manuel Matias (footballer) (born 1964), Portuguese footballer
