= Antonio Nogueira =

Antonio Nogueira may refer to:

- António Nogueira (footballer, born 1951), Portuguese footballer
- António Nogueira (footballer, born 1963), Portuguese footballer
- António Reymão Nogueira (1909–1987), Portuguese equestrian
- Antônio Rodrigo Nogueira (born 1976), Brazilian heavyweight mixed martial artist
- Antônio Rogério Nogueira (born 1976), Brazilian light heavyweight mixed martial artist
