= José Barroso (footballer) =

Portuguese football manager and former player

Personal information
- Full name: José Alberto da Mota Barroso
- Date of birth: 26 August 1970 (age 56)
- Place of birth: Braga, Portugal
- Height: 1.80 m (5 ft 11 in)
- Position: Defensive midfielder

Youth career
- 1984–1989: Braga

Senior career*
Years	Team	Apps	(Gls)
1989–1991	Braga B		
1990–1996	Braga	117	(17)
1992–1993	→ Rio Ave (loan)	34	(2)
1996–1999	Porto	36	(4)
1998–1999	→ Académica (loan)	26	(1)
1999–2005	Braga	149	(33)
Total		362	(57)

International career
1995	Portugal	1	(0)

Managerial career
- 2009–2010: Braga (youth)
- 2011–2012: Vieira
- 2013: Vilaverdense (assistant)
- 2013–2014: Porto D'Ave
- 2014–2015: Maria da Fonte
- * Club domestic league appearances and goals

José Alberto da Mota Barroso (born 26 August 1970) is a Portuguese former professional footballer who played as a defensive midfielder. He also was a manager.

Over 14 seasons, he amassed Primeira Liga totals of 328 matches and 55 goals, mainly in representation of Braga (eleven years).

== Club career ==
Barroso was born in Braga. Armed with a powerful outside shot, he made his professional debut with hometown's S.C. Braga during the 1990–91 season, playing four games in the Primeira Liga. After a successful loan also in the north, with Segunda Liga club Rio Ave FC, he returned, becoming an essential midfield element for the Minho side as well as their captain; in his last two years, although they finished tenth and eighth respectively, he scored a total of 14 league goals, mostly from long-range shots and/or free kicks.

Subsequently, Barroso signed for FC Porto, winning two consecutive leagues although he would only be a fringe player in his second season, featuring in just nine matches out of 34. After one year with Académica de Coimbra he returned to Braga, now consolidated in the Portuguese top flight; he netted 13 times in his first two seasons, then added a career-best 12 goals in the 2002–03 campaign but the team could only rank in 14th place.

Barroso retired from football in the summer of 2005 aged 35, after helping Braga to two consecutive UEFA Cup qualifications, even though he contributed sparingly due to injuries.

== International career ==
Barroso won his sole cap for Portugal on 26 January 1995, as an 89th-minute substitute for Ricardo Sá Pinto in a 1–1 draw against Canada in the SkyDome Cup.

== Honours ==
Porto

- Primeira Liga: 1996–97, 1997–98
- Taça de Portugal: 1997–98
- Supertaça Cândido de Oliveira: 1996
