= Rui Filipe =

Portuguese footballer

Personal information
- Full name: Rui Filipe Tavares de Bastos
- Date of birth: 8 March 1968
- Place of birth: Vale de Cambra, Portugal
- Date of death: 28 August 1994 (aged 26)
- Place of death: Santa Maria da Feira, Portugal
- Height: 1.73 m (5 ft 8 in)
- Position: Midfielder

Youth career
- 1981–1984: Valecambrense
- 1984–1986: Porto

Senior career*
Years	Team	Apps	(Gls)
1986–1994	Porto	65	(5)
1986–1988	→ Gil Vicente (loan)	60	(6)
1988–1990	→ Espinho (loan)	64	(2)
1990–1991	→ Gil Vicente (loan)	33	(3)
Total		222	(16)

International career
1989	Portugal U21	5	(0)
1992–1993	Portugal	6	(0)
- * Club domestic league appearances and goals

Rui Filipe Tavares de Bastos (8 March 1968 – 28 August 1994) was a Portuguese professional footballer who played as a central midfielder.

== Club career ==
Born in Vale de Cambra, Porto metropolitan area, Rui Filipe began his career with Gil Vicente in the Segunda Liga, then spent two seasons with Espinho, 1988–89 in the Primeira Liga, at the age of 20. In 1990 he returned to Gil, still on loan from Porto, helping the Barcelos side to retain their top-division status after finishing 13th.

Rui Filipe returned to the Estádio das Antas in summer 1991, scoring four goals in 25 matches in his first year as the club won the league. In the 1993–94 UEFA Champions League, his team reached the semi-finals of the tournament, with him opening a 5–0 first group-stage away win over Werder Bremen.

Rui Filipe continued to be an important midfield element for Porto in the following campaigns. At the beginning of 1994–95 he scored in the first fixture against Braga, repeating the feat in the first leg of the Supertaça Cândido de Oliveira against Benfica but also being sent off, eventually claiming the trophy.

== International career ==
Shortly after signing for Porto, Rui Filipe reached the Portugal national team, going on to be capped six times. He made his debut on 31 May in the 1992 edition of the U.S. Cup, coming on as a late substitute for Luís Figo in the 0–0 draw with Italy.

== Death ==
On 28 August 1994, Rui Filipe died in a car accident in the Santa Maria da Feira municipality of Gândara, aged only 26.

== Honours ==
Porto

- Primeira Divisão: 1991–92, 1992–93, 1994–95
- Taça de Portugal: 1993–94
- Supertaça Cândido de Oliveira: 1992, 1993, 1994
