= Fernando Bandeirinha =

Portuguese footballer

Personal information
- Full name: Fernando Óscar Bandeirinha Barbosa
- Date of birth: 26 November 1962 (age 63)
- Place of birth: Porto, Portugal
- Height: 1.70 m (5 ft 7 in)
- Positions: Right back; defensive midfielder

Youth career
- 1976–1981: Porto

Senior career*
| Years | Team | Apps | (Gls) |
| 1981–1996 | Porto | 114 | (8) |
| 1982–1984 | → Paços Ferreira (loan) | 45 | (9) |
| 1984–1985 | → Varzim (loan) | 22 | (0) |
| 1984–1985 | → Académica (loan) | 25 | (2) |
| 1996–1997 | Felgueiras | 4 | (0) |
| Total | | 210 | (19) |

Managerial career
- 1999–2000: Porto B
- 2000–2006: Porto B (assistant)
- * Club domestic league appearances and goals

Fernando Óscar Bandeirinha Barbosa (born 26 November 1962 in Porto), known as Bandeirinha, is a Portuguese retired footballer who played as a right back or a defensive midfielder throughout his career.

== Football career ==
During his career, Bandeirinha played mainly for FC Porto, never being more than a reserve player during his 15-year spell – which also included loans to F.C. Paços de Ferreira, Varzim S.C. and Académica de Coimbra – as he was barred by for instance legendary João Domingos Pinto (who appeared in more than 580 official matches for the club) in the right back position.

In 1996, already aged 33, he moved to F.C. Felgueiras in the second division, where he finished his career after one year. Bandeirinha was never capped for Portugal but was a last-minute addition for the squad at the 1986 FIFA World Cup, after S.L. Benfica's António Veloso was suspended due to a doping test, later proven to be fake.

From 1999 to 2006, Bandeirinha worked as a coach with his main club's reserve team, but almost exclusively as an assistant.

== Honours ==
Porto

- Primeira Divisão: 1987–88, 1989–90, 1991–92, 1992–93, 1994–95, 1995–96
- Taça de Portugal: 1988, 1990–91, 1993–94
- Supertaça Cândido de Oliveira: 1991, 1994
- European Cup: 1986–87
- European Super Cup: 1987
