= László Czéh =

Hungarian footballer

Personal information
- Full name: László Czéh
- Date of birth: 1 February 1968 (age 58)
- Place of birth: Hungary
- Height: 5 ft 10 in (1.78 m)
- Position: Midfielder

Senior career*
Years	Team	Apps	(Gls)
1988–1992	Pécsi Mecsek FC	93	(15)
1992–1994	FC Fehérvár	34	(5)
1994–1995	Ferencvárosi TC	21	(2)
1995	Beitar Jerusalem	?	(?)
1995–1996	Ironi Ashdod	?	(?)
1996–1997	Maccabi Netanya	?	(?)
1997–1998	Hapoel Jerusalem	?	(?)
1998–2000	Maccabi Netanya	57	(24)
2000	Hapoel Jerusalem	?	(?)
2000–2001	Hapoel Beit She'an	?	(4)

International career
1992	Hungary	2	(0)
- * Club domestic league appearances and goals

László Czéh (born 1 February 1968) is a Hungarian retired football player. He is currently the coach of Kecskemét TE.

== Career ==
In the 1998/99 season, Czeh scored 19 goals for Maccabi Netanya to clinch the title of Israel best goalscorer in the second league.

== Honours ==
- Hungarian Premier League: 1994–95
- Hungarian Cup: 1990, 1995
- Israeli Second Division: 1998–99
