= Tony Camacho =

Portuguese-born Canadian soccer referee

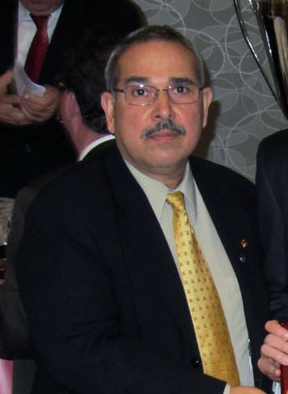
- Camacho in 2011
- Born: Portugal

Domestic
Years	League	Role
1992	CSL	Referee
1997	USISL	Referee
1998–1999	CPSL	Referee

International
Years	League	Role
1991–2000	FIFA listed	Referee

Tony Camacho is a Portuguese-born Canadian former soccer referee.

== Career ==
He was born in the Portuguese island of Madeira, and he emigrated to Canada in 1972 where he began refereeing at senior amateur level. In 1987, he began officiating at the professional level with the advent of the Canadian Soccer League. In 1992, he received his national referee's badge, and was assigned to the Canada Games in 1993, and 1997. In 1993, he served on the FIFA International Referees List for seven years. Camacho also officiated a match between Portugal and Denmark League XI in the SkyDome Cup.

After the demise of the Canadian Soccer League he officiated in the Canadian National Soccer League, and in the USISL A-League. He was assigned to six CIAU national championships, and officiated in the Dallas Cup. He later worked in the Canadian Professional Soccer League, where he officiated in the 1999 CPSL Championship final. After his retirement he served on the CPSL Executive Committee as the Director of Officials until 2004. In 2008, he returned to the executive committee in the same capacity. He would later serve as the Canadian Soccer Association Chair of Canada Soccer’s Referee Committee and as National Assessor.
