= SkyDome Cup =

Defunct association football tournament

1995 SkyDome Cup
Tournament details
- Host country: Canada
- Dates: 24 January – 29 January
- Teams: 7 (from 4 confederations)
- Venue: 1 (in 1 host city)

Final positions
- Champions: Portugal (1st title)
- Runners-up: Denmark League XI
- Third place: Canada

Tournament statistics
- Matches played: 3
- Goals scored: 4 (1.33 per match)
- Top scorer(s): Four players (1 goal each)

The SkyDome Cup was a soccer tournament played in late January 1995 in the SkyDome stadium (now Rogers Centre) between hosts Canada, then European champions Denmark, and Portugal. As the tournament was played in a crucial part of the European leagues the European sides presented alternate sides (Denmark consisting of a Danish League XI), which resulted in the only (or first) international caps for some of players involved.

Played January 24, the first match put hosts Canada against Denmark, and resulted in a one-nil win for the European champions with a goal by Højer Nielsen. Canada would play their second game two days later against Portugal, which resulted in a one-goal draw, with goals by António Folha and Alex Bunbury.

With Canada out of the race with 1 point in their two matches, the winner would be known in the final game, played January 29 between Denmark (who only needed a draw) and Portugal. Paulo Alves scored late in the game, giving Portugal their first victory at senior level.

== Final standings ==
Team	Pld	W	D	L	GF	GA	GD	Pts	Qualification
Portugal	2	1	1	0	2	1	+1	4	Winners
Denmark League XI	2	1	0	1	1	1	0	3	
Canada (H)	2	0	1	1	1	2	−1	1	

(H) Hosts

== Results ==
=== Canada vs Denmark ===
Friendly
24 January 1995

Canada	0–1	Denmark League XI
		Højer 52'

SkyDome, Toronto
Attendance: 10,024
Referee: Zimmerman Boulos (United States)

=== Canada vs Portugal ===
Friendly
26 January 1995

Canada	1–1	Portugal
Bunbury 82'		Folha 10'

SkyDome, Toronto
Attendance: 13,658
Referee: Zimmerman Boulos (United States)

=== Portugal vs Denmark ===
Friendly
29 January 1995

Portugal	1–0	Denmark League XI
Alves 89'

SkyDome, Toronto
Attendance: 23,700
Referee: Tony Camacho (Canada)

SkyDome Cup

Portugal
First title

== Statistics ==
=== Goalscorers ===
There were 4 goals scored in 3 matches, for an average of 1.33 goals per match.

1 goal

- (Canada) Alex Bunbury
- (Denmark) Lars Højer
- (Portugal) António Folha
- (Portugal) Paulo Alves

== See also ==
- U.S. Cup
- 1988 Matthews Cup
