= Carlos Secretário =

Portuguese footballer (born 1970)

Personal information
- Full name: Carlos Alberto de Oliveira Secretário
- Date of birth: 12 May 1970 (age 56)
- Place of birth: São João da Madeira, Portugal
- Height: 1.75 m (5 ft 9 in)
- Position: Right-back

Youth career
- 1984–1985: Sanjoanense
- 1985–1986: Sporting CP
- 1986–1988: Porto

Senior career*
Years	Team	Apps	(Gls)
1988–1989	Gil Vicente	29	(2)
1989–1991	Penafiel	64	(2)
1991–1992	Famalicão	31	(2)
1992–1993	Braga	31	(2)
1993–1996	Porto	86	(6)
1996–1997	Real Madrid	13	(0)
1998–2004	Porto	129	(0)
2004–2005	Maia	24	(0)
Total		407	(14)

International career
1992–1993	Portugal U21	7	(0)
1994–2001	Portugal	35	(1)

Managerial career
- 2007–2008: Maia
- 2008–2009: Lousada
- 2009: Arouca
- 2012–2013: Salgueiros 08
- 2015–2017: Lusitanos Saint-Maur
- 2017–2018: Cesarense
- 2018–2020: Créteil
Medal record
Men's football
Representing Portugal
UEFA European Championship
Bronze medal – third place	2000 Belgium-Netherlands
- * Club domestic league appearances and goals

Carlos Alberto de Oliveira Secretário (born 12 May 1970) is a Portuguese former professional footballer who played mainly as a right-back, currently a manager.

In a 17-year career, in which he appeared in 341 Primeira Liga games and scored 12 goals, he played for six clubs in his country including Porto, with which he won 16 major titles. He also briefly represented Real Madrid.

Secretário played more than 30 times with the Portugal national team, representing the country in two European Championships. In 2007, he started working as a coach.

== Playing career ==
=== Club ===
After making his professional debut with Gil Vicente in the Segunda Liga, Secretário, who was born in São João da Madeira and started his career as a midfielder, moved to the Primeira Liga with Penafiel in 1989, then spent one additional season with Famalicão in the same league. Ahead of 1992–93, he signed for Braga.

In the summer of 1993, Secretário joined Porto, quickly establishing himself as an undisputed starter in defense or midfield – after João Pinto's retirement, he played almost exclusively as a right-back – and helping the northerners to two leagues, one Cup and one Supercup in his first spell. He attracted attention from Real Madrid, which signed the player in July 1996, but he would encounter extreme difficulties in carving a starting niche with the Spanish club, which was aggravated with the January 1997 signing of Italian Christian Panucci; in a bizarre incident in a game against Real Betis at the Santiago Bernabéu Stadium, a delay was caused by a rabbit presumably thrown into the fray from the terraces, and he was quick enough to catch it. "Secretário may or may be not a good player," said TV commentator Arsenio Iglesias at the time, "but he is indeed a great hunter."

Secretário returned to Porto in January 1998 for six-and-a-half additional seasons, and would go on to conquer the UEFA Cup and the UEFA Champions League in successive years, although he was now only backup to emergent Paulo Ferreira. On 14 March 2002, he was sent off for a professional foul on Emmanuel Olisadebe during a 2–1 continental home win over Panathinaikos, receiving a three-match suspension.

In June 2005, Secretário retired after one year with Maia (second tier).

=== International ===
Secretário earned 35 caps for Portugal, and played at the 1996 and 2000 European Championships. In both cases second choice, he totalled three appearances.

Carlos Secretário: International goals
No.	Date	Venue	Opponent	Score	Result	Competition
1	3 June 1995	Estádio das Antas, Porto, Portugal	Latvia	2–0	3–2	Euro 1996 qualifying

== Coaching career ==
In 2007, two years after retiring, Secretário started his coaching career with Portuguese fourth-tier side Maia, where he had retired as a player. He continued working in the lower leagues in the following seasons, also having a spell in French amateur football.

Secretário was appointed at Championnat National 2 club Créteil-Lusitanos on 1 June 2018. In his first season, with a team including compatriots and their diaspora on the pitch and in the backroom, he won promotion as champions with four games remaining. He resigned in December 2020, citing health problems and the desire to retire to Portugal.

In August 2022, 52-year-old Secretário was placed in intensive care after suffering a stroke. After four months of recovery, he was next seen publicly on New Year's Day.

== Honours ==
=== Player ===
Porto

- Primeira Liga: 1994–95, 1995–96, 1997–98, 1998–99, 2002–03, 2003–04
- Taça de Portugal: 1993–94, 1997–98, 1999–2000, 2000–01, 2002–03
- Supertaça Cândido de Oliveira: 1993, 1994, 1998, 1999
- UEFA Cup: 2002–03

Real Madrid

- La Liga: 1996–97

Portugal

- UEFA European Championship third place: 2000

=== Manager ===
Créteil

- Championnat National 2: 2018–19
