= Serifo =

Bissauguinean footballer

Personal information
- Full name: Serifo Soares Cassamá
- Date of birth: 29 August 1966 (age 60)
- Place of birth: Bissau
- Height: 1.83 m (6 ft 0 in)
- Position: Midfielder

Senior career*
Years	Team	Apps	(Gls)
1984–1988	Sport Bissau e Benfica		
1988–2003	Leça		
- * Club domestic league appearances and goals

Serifo Soares Cassamá (born 29 August 1966) is a retired Bissau-Guinean football midfielder.

Serifo played as a striker for Leça F.C. in the Primeira Liga during the 1990s.
