= Fernando Dinis =

Portuguese footballer (born 1982)

Personal information
- Full name: Fernando Alberto Morais Dinis
- Date of birth: 25 July 1982 (age 44)
- Place of birth: Vila Real, Portugal
- Height: 1.84 m (6 ft 1/2 in)
- Position: Left back

Youth career
- 1995–1996: Diogo Cão
- 1996–2000: Vila Real
- 2000–2001: Sporting CP

Senior career*
Years	Team	Apps	(Gls)
2001–2004	Sporting B	71	(3)
2004–2005	Santa Marta Penaguião		
2005–2006	Olivais Moscavide	20	(0)
2006–2007	Boavista	7	(0)
2007	Trofense	0	(0)
2008	União Madeira	17	(0)
2008–2009	Beira-Mar	3	(0)
2009–2011	Zagłębie Lubin	28	(1)
Total		146	(4)
- * Club domestic league appearances and goals

Fernando Alberto Morais Dinis (born 25 July 1982) is a Portuguese former professional footballer who played as a left-back.

== Club career ==
Born in Vila Real, Dinis finished his formative years at Sporting CP, but only represented its reserves as a senior. He made his debut with lowly Associação Desportiva e Cultural de Santa Marta de Penaguião in the fourth tier Terceira Divisão, moving to third tier Segunda Divisão with C.D. Olivais e Moscavide the following season, where he teamed up with Miguel Veloso.

In 2006–07, aged 24, Dinis first competed in the Primeira Liga, appearing in seven matches for Boavista FC. He split the following campaign between C.D. Trofense and C.F. União, and signed with S.C. Beira-Mar of the second tier for 2008–09, having his contract terminated in June 2009 after only five competitive appearances.

Dinis moved abroad in late July 2009, joining Polish club Zagłębie Lubin. He was released on 1 June 2011, after spending two years in the Ekstraklasa mainly as a back-up left-back.
