= Nelo (Portuguese footballer) =

Portuguese footballer

Personal information
- Full name: Manuel António Couto Guimarães
- Date of birth: 25 August 1967 (age 59)
- Place of birth: Porto, Portugal
- Height: 1.75 m (5 ft 9 in)
- Positions: Left back; midfielder

Youth career
- 1982–1986: Boavista

Senior career*
Years	Team	Apps	(Gls)
1986–1994	Boavista	122	(7)
1986–1987	→ Felgueiras (loan)		
1987–1988	→ Farense (loan)	25	(0)
1989–1990	→ Farense (loan)	26	(2)
1994–1995	Benfica	23	(0)
1995–1997	Boavista	43	(1)
1997–1999	Rio Ave	24	(0)
1999–2001	Fafe	48	(4)
2000	→ Moreirense (loan)	7	(0)
2001–2005	Lousada	75	(17)
2004	→ Vizela (loan)	12	(2)
2005–2006	Maria Fonte		
2006–2007	Tirsense		
Total		405	(33)

International career
1987	Portugal U21	1	(0)
1990–1995	Portugal	11	(0)
- * Club domestic league appearances and goals

Manuel António Couto Guimarães (born 25 August 1967), commonly known as Nelo, is a retired Portuguese footballer. On the left side of the field, he could appear as either a defender or a midfielder.

== Football career ==
Born in Porto, Nelo grew in local Boavista FC's youth system, then went on to mainly represent its first team as a professional. After an unassuming season at Primeira Liga side S.L. Benfica, he returned to his first club in the 1995 summer, then represented another three teams in quick succession.

Nelo retired in 2007 in amateur football, at the age of almost 40. He earned 11 caps for Portugal, but did not attend any major international tournament – the nation did not qualify for either UEFA Euro 1992 and the 1994 FIFA World Cup.
