= Rui Barros =

Portuguese footballer and manager

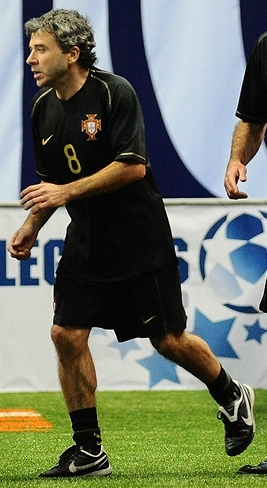
- Barros at the 2011 Legends Cup

Personal information
- Full name: Rui Gil Soares de Barros
- Date of birth: 24 November 1965 (age 60)
- Place of birth: Paredes, Portugal
- Height: 1.59 m (5 ft 3 in)
- Position: Attacking midfielder

Youth career
- 1978–1979: Aliados Lordelo
- 1980–1982: Rebordosa
- 1982–1983: Paços Ferreira
- 1983–1984: Porto

Senior career*
Years	Team	Apps	(Gls)
1984–1985	Covilhã	25	(5)
1985–1987	Varzim	58	(12)
1987–1988	Porto	34	(12)
1988–1990	Juventus	60	(14)
1990–1993	Monaco	81	(14)
1993–1994	Marseille	17	(4)
1994–2000	Porto	134	(25)
Total		409	(86)

International career
1987–1996	Portugal	36	(4)

Managerial career
- 2005–2010: Porto (assistant)
- 2006: Porto (caretaker)
- 2014–2017: Porto (assistant)
- 2016: Porto (caretaker)
- 2018–2021: Porto B
- * Club domestic league appearances and goals

Rui Gil Soares de Barros (born 24 November 1965) is a Portuguese former professional footballer who played as an attacking midfielder, currently a manager.

He played with success in Portugal (at Porto), Italy – at Juventus – and France (two clubs), later becoming a manager. Over eight seasons, he amassed Primeira Liga totals of 191 matches and 43 goals, all with Porto.

Barros represented Portugal on 36 occasions, scoring four goals.

== Club career ==
=== Early years and Porto ===
Born in Paredes, Porto District, Barros began his senior career with Covilhã in the Segunda Liga. He helped Varzim gain promotion to the Primeira Liga in his second season as a professional.

Barros signed with Porto for 1987–88, immediately having an impact: 12 goals in the league, which ended with the championship conquest, also being essential as the northerners began the campaign with two major achievements, the European Super Cup against Ajax and the Intercontinental Cup against Peñarol (he also scored in the first leg of the Super Cup final). As a result, he was voted Portuguese Footballer of the Year.

=== Abroad ===
Barros joined Italian side Juventus in the summer of 1988, where he chose to wear the number 8 shirt, turning down the opportunity to wear the prestigious number 10 shirt, which had previously belonged to the recently retired Michel Platini, whose role he had inherited at the Turin club. During his two-year tenure, he scored 19 goals in 95 appearances in all competitions and helped to a Coppa Italia and UEFA Cup double in 1990.

Subsequently, Barros moved to Monaco, originally for one year (eventually three). During his spell, he notably lost the final of the 1991–92 European Cup Winners' Cup to Werder Bremen.

In the 1993 off-season, Barros signed with another team in France, Marseille, teaming up with compatriot Paulo Futre – who left Porto for Atlético Madrid precisely the year he arrived. The former contributed in helping them to a second-place finish in the league, although the club was relegated following its involvement in a match fixing scandal.

=== Return to Porto ===
In the summer of 1994, Barros returned to Porto, where he became an important attacking element in four of five consecutive league wins. He retired from football in June 2000, at the age of 34.

Barros stayed connected to his main club after his retirement, as a manager. After Co Adriaanse resigned in August 2006 during preseason, he was appointed as interim coach for two matches, against England's Portsmouth (2–1) and Manchester City (1–0).

Barros was also on the bench for the 3–0 win over Vitória in the domestic super cup, on 19 August 2006. Jesualdo Ferreira was appointed shortly afterwards, and he stayed as his assistant during the following campaigns as Porto won the league four times in a row.

On 13 June 2018, Barros succeeded former Porto and Portugal teammate António Folha at the helm of Porto's reserves, who competed in the second tier. On 3 February 2021, with the team dead last with 16 games remaining, Folha was put back in the position.

== International career ==
Whilst at Varzim, Barros was noticed by the Portugal national team, and made his senior debut on 29 March 1987 in a 2–2 draw against minnows Malta for the UEFA Euro 1988 qualifiers, playing the second half of the match held in Funchal, Madeira. During his time with Juventus he was already a leading player, although he was unable to help his country qualify for the 1990 FIFA World Cup to be held in Italy.

Barros was overlooked for the squad picked by manager António Oliveira for Euro 1996 in England. His last cap came on 14 December 1996 in a 0–0 draw with Germany in the 1998 World Cup qualifying phase, in Lisbon.

== Style of play ==
A dynamic and hard-working team player, Barros was a diminutive attacking midfielder who was known in particular for his speed, stamina and technical ability, which allowed him to excel in Juventus' counter-attacking style of play under manager Dino Zoff. Tactically versatile, he was capable of playing in several offensive midfield and attacking positions.

== Career statistics ==
Scores and results list Portugal's goal tally first, score column indicates score after each Barros goal.

List of international goals scored by Rui Barros
No.	Date	Venue	Opponent	Score	Result	Competition
1	11 October 1989	Ludwigsparkstadion, Saarbrücken, Germany	Luxembourg	3–0	3–0	1990 World Cup qualification
2	4 September 1991	Estádio das Antas, Porto, Portugal	Austria	1–0	1–1	Friendly
3	28 April 1993	Estádio da Luz (1954), Lisbon, Portugal	Scotland	1–0	5–0	1994 World Cup qualification
4	28 April 1993	Estádio da Luz (1954), Lisbon, Portugal	Scotland	4–0	5–0	1994 World Cup qualification

== Managerial statistics ==
As of match played 31 January 2021

Managerial record by team and tenure
Team	Nat	From	To	Record								Ref
Team	Nat	From	To	G	W	D	L	GF	GA	GD	Win %	Ref
Porto (caretaker)	(Portugal)	9 August 2006	18 August 2006	1	1	0	0	3	0	+3	100.00	
Porto (caretaker)	(Portugal)	8 January 2016	21 January 2016	4	2	0	2	6	2	+4	50.00	
Porto B	(Portugal)	13 June 2018	3 February 2021	76	21	23	32	98	110	−12	27.63	
Total				81	24	23	34	107	112	−5	29.63	—

== Honours ==
=== Player ===
Porto

- Primeira Divisão: 1987–88, 1994–95, 1995–96, 1996–97, 1997–98, 1998–99
- Taça de Portugal: 1987–88, 1997–98, 1999–00
- Supertaça Cândido de Oliveira: 1993, 1994, 1996, 1998, 1999
- European Super Cup: 1987
- Intercontinental Cup: 1987

Juventus

- Coppa Italia: 1989–90
- UEFA Cup: 1989–90

Monaco

- Coupe de France: 1990–91
- UEFA Cup Winners' Cup runner-up: 1991–92

Individual

- Portuguese Footballer of the Year: 1988

=== Manager ===
Porto

- Supertaça Cândido de Oliveira: 2006
