= António Folha =

Portuguese football player and manager (born 1971)

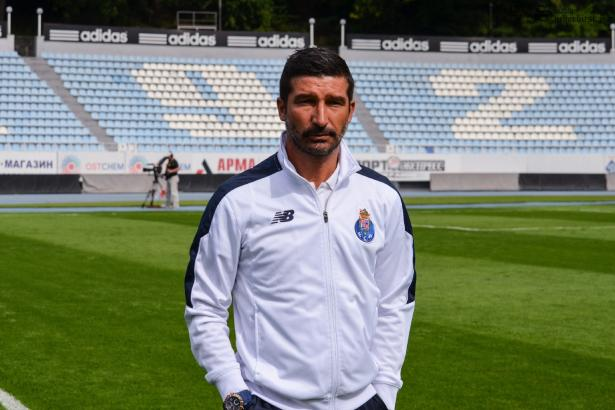
- Folha with Porto B in 2021

Personal information
- Full name: António José dos Santos Folha
- Date of birth: 21 May 1971 (age 55)
- Place of birth: Vila Nova de Gaia, Portugal
- Height: 1.71 m (5 ft 7 in)
- Position: Winger

Youth career
- 1981–1982: Canidelo
- 1982–1989: Porto

Senior career*
| Years | Team | Apps | (Gls) |
| 1989–2003 | Porto | 135 | (16) |
| 1989–1991 | → Gil Vicente (loan) | 72 | (7) |
| 1992–1993 | → Braga (loan) | 31 | (1) |
| 1998–1999 | → Standard Liège (loan) | 25 | (3) |
| 2000 | → Standard Liège (loan) | 15 | (2) |
| 2002 | → AEK Athens (loan) | 9 | (0) |
| 2003–2005 | Penafiel | 50 | (7) |
| Total | | 337 | (36) |

International career
| 1987 | Portugal U16 | 12 | (2) |
| 1988 | Portugal U18 | 4 | (2) |
| 1989 | Portugal U20 | 4 | (0) |
| 1990–1991 | Portugal U21 | 9 | (1) |
| 1993–1997 | Portugal | 26 | (5) |

Managerial career
- 2005–2007: Penafiel (assistant)
- 2008–2009: Porto U17 (assistant)
- 2009–2011: Porto U15 (assistant)
- 2009–2011: Porto U15
- 2013–2014: Porto B (assistant)
- 2014: Porto (assistant)
- 2009–2011: Porto U19
- 2016–2018: Porto B
- 2018–2020: Portimonense
- 2021–2024: Porto B
- 2026: CFR Cluj
Medal record
Men's football
Representing Portugal
FIFA U-20 World Cup
| Winner | 1989 Saudi Arabia |
UEFA European Under-18 Championship
| Runner-up | 1988 Czechoslovakia |
- * Club domestic league appearances and goals

António José dos Santos Folha CvIH (born 21 May 1971) is a Portuguese former professional footballer who played mostly as a winger. He is currently a manager.

He amassed Primeira Liga totals of 227 matches and 22 goals over 12 seasons, mainly in representation of Porto. He also appeared in the competition with Gil Vicente and Braga, and was part of the Portugal squad at Euro 1996.

Folha worked as a manager after retiring, starting out at Porto B before joining Portimonense in 2018.

== Club career ==
Folha was born in Vila Nova de Gaia, Porto District. In his career, he played mostly for Porto, with loan stints in Portugal, Belgium and Greece; at AEK Athens, to where he arrived on 3 January 2002, he won the Greek Football Cup.

Folha was often used as a substitute by his main club, where he won a total of 18 major titles (including seven Primeira Liga trophies and five Taça de Portugal). He had his best years with the team from 1994 to 1996, contributing ten goals in 58 games as they won back-to-back national championships.

At the end of the 2002–03 season, aged 32, Folha was finally released by Porto and joined Penafiel of the Segunda Liga, helping to a return to the top flight in his first year. He retired from football in 2005, and joined his last team's coaching staff immediately afterwards, also serving a two-season stint as assistant manager, one in each of the major levels.

== International career ==
Folha earned 26 caps for Portugal over a three-year period, and was selected for the UEFA Euro 1996 tournament, appearing in three matches in an eventual quarter-final exit and assisting Ricardo Sá Pinto in the 1–1 group stage draw against Denmark.

Previously, he helped the under-20 team to win the 1989 FIFA World Youth Championship in Saudi Arabia.

== Coaching career ==
Folha returned to Porto once again in 2008, being named assistant with the junior side and remaining in the position for several seasons. Later, he coached the reserves.

In June 2018, Folha replaced the departed Vítor Oliveira at the helm of top-division team Portimonense. He finished 12th in his first season on the Algarve, and resigned on 18 January 2020 when second from bottom having lost to last-placed Aves.

Folha returned to Porto B on 2 February 2021, taking over from Rui Barros – who had succeeded him – at the last-placed side in the second tier. He secured their survival in the last matchday.

On 9 June 2026, Folha was appointed at CFR Cluj on a one-year contract; he was brought in by his compatriot Cadú, the Romanian club's director of football. On 7 August, however, following a 0–5 home loss to Tromsø in the third qualifying round of the UEFA Conference League, he was dismissed.

== Personal life ==
Folha's son, Bernardo, is also a footballer. A midfielder, he was also developed at Porto, being coached at the reserve team by his father.

== Career statistics ==
=== Club ===
Appearances and goals by club, season and competition
| Club | Season | League | | | National Cup (Note: Includes Taça de Portugal, Belgian Cup, Greek Football Cup) | | Europe | | Other | | Total | |
| Club | Season | Division | Apps | Goals | Apps | Goals | Apps | Goals | Apps | Goals | Apps | Goals |
|---|---|---|---|---|---|---|---|---|---|---|---|---|
| Gil Vicente (loan) | 1989–90 | Segunda Divisão | 35 | 3 | 4 | 0 | — | | — | | 39 | 3 |
| Gil Vicente (loan) | 1990–91 | Primeira Divisão | 37 | 4 | 2 | 0 | — | | — | | 39 | 4 |
| Gil Vicente (loan) | Total | | 72 | 7 | 6 | 0 | — | | — | | 78 | 7 |
| Porto | 1991–92 | Primeira Divisão | 9 | 0 | 0 | 0 | 2 (Note: Appearances in European Cup Winners' Cup) | 0 | 1 (Note: Appearances in Supertaça Cândido de Oliveira) | 0 | 12 | 0 |
| Porto | 1993–94 | Primeira Divisão | 20 | 2 | 2 | 0 | 6 (Note: Appearances in UEFA Champions League) | 0 | 2 | 0 | 30 | 2 |
| Porto | 1994–95 | Primeira Divisão | 27 | 6 | 3 | 0 | 5 (Note: Appearances in UEFA Cup Winners' Cup) | 0 | 2 | 0 | 37 | 6 |
| Porto | 1995–96 | Primeira Divisão | 31 | 4 | 7 | 1 | 6 | 0 | 3 | 0 | 47 | 5 |
| Porto | 1996–97 | Primeira Divisão | 15 | 3 | 2 | 0 | 3 | 0 | 0 | 0 | 20 | 3 |
| Porto | 1997–98 | Primeira Divisão | 14 | 0 | 3 | 1 | 3 | 0 | 2 | 0 | 22 | 1 |
| Porto | 1998–99 | Primeira Divisão | 1 | 0 | — | | — | | 1 | 0 | 2 | 0 |
| Porto | 1999–00 | Primeira Liga | 4 | 0 | 1 | 1 | 0 | 0 | 0 | 0 | 5 | 1 |
| Porto | 2000–01 | Primeira Liga | 14 | 1 | 5 | 0 | 0 | 0 | 1 | 0 | 20 | 1 |
| Porto | 2001–02 | Primeira Liga | 0 | 0 | 0 | 0 | 0 | 0 | 0 | 0 | 0 | 0 |
| Porto | 2002–03 | Primeira Liga | 0 | 0 | 0 | 0 | 0 | 0 | — | | 0 | 0 |
| Porto | Total | | 135 | 16 | 23 | 3 | 25 | 0 | 12 | 0 | 195 | 19 |
| Braga (loan) | 1992–93 | Primeira Divisão | 31 | 1 | 3 | 1 | — | | — | | 34 | 2 |
| Standard Liège (loan) | 1998–99 | Belgian First Division | 25 | 3 | 6 | 3 | — | | 0 | 0 | 31 | 6 |
| Standard Liège (loan) | 2000–01 | Belgian First Division | 15 | 2 | 2 | 0 | 2 (Note: Appearances in UEFA Intertoto Cup) | 0 | — | | 19 | 2 |
| AEK Athens (loan) | 2001–02 | Alpha Ethniki | 9 | 0 | 5 | 1 | 1 (Note: Appearances in UEFA Cup) | 0 | — | | 15 | 1 |
| Penafiel | 2003–04 | Segunda Liga | 26 | 6 | 2 | 0 | — | | — | | 28 | 6 |
| Penafiel | 2004–05 | Primeira Liga | 24 | 1 | 2 | 2 | — | | — | | 26 | 3 |
| Penafiel | Total | | 50 | 7 | 4 | 2 | — | | — | | 54 | 9 |
| Career total | | | 337 | 36 | 49 | 10 | 28 | 0 | 12 | 0 | 426 | 46 |

=== International ===
Appearances and goals by national team and year
| National team | Year | Apps | Goals |
|---|---|---|---|
| Portugal | 1993 | 2 | 1 |
| Portugal | 1994 | 3 | 1 |
| Portugal | 1995 | 10 | 1 |
| Portugal | 1996 | 11 | 2 |
| Portugal | 1997 | 0 | 0 |
| Total | | 26 | 5 |

Scores and results list Portugal's goal tally first, score column indicates score after each Folha goal.

List of international goals scored by António Folha
| No. | Date | Venue | Opponent | Score | Result | Competition |
|---|---|---|---|---|---|---|
| 1 | 5 September 1993 | Kadrioru staadion, Tallinn, Estonia | Estonia | 2–0 | 2–0 | 1994 FIFA World Cup qualification |
| 2 | 18 December 1994 | Estádio da Luz, Lisbon, Portugal | Liechtenstein | 6–0 | 8–0 | UEFA Euro 1996 qualifying |
| 3 | 26 January 1995 | SkyDome, Toronto, Canada | Canada | 1–0 | 1–1 | Friendly |
| 4 | 21 February 1996 | Estádio das Antas, Porto, Portugal | Germany | 1–1 | 1–2 | Friendly |
| 5 | 29 May 1996 | Lansdowne Road, Dublin, Republic of Ireland | Republic of Ireland | 1–0 | 1–0 | Friendly |

== Managerial statistics ==
As of 6 August 2026

Managerial record by team and tenure
| Team | Nat | From | To | Record | | | | | | | |
| Team | Nat | From | To | G | W | D | L | GF | GA | GD | Win % |
|---|---|---|---|---|---|---|---|---|---|---|---|
| Porto B | (Portugal) | 29 December 2016 | 5 June 2018 | 60 | 28 | 10 | 22 | 81 | 77 | +4 | 46.67 |
| Portimonense | (Portugal) | 5 June 2018 | 18 January 2020 | 58 | 15 | 15 | 28 | 65 | 95 | −30 | 25.86 |
| Porto B | (Portugal) | 3 February 2021 | 30 June 2024 | 115 | 37 | 36 | 42 | 161 | 158 | +3 | 32.17 |
| CFR Cluj | (Romania) | 15 June 2026 | 7 August 2026 | 6 | 2 | 1 | 3 | 11 | 11 | +0 | 33.33 |
| Career totals | | | | 239 | 82 | 62 | 95 | 318 | 341 | −23 | 34.31 |

== Honours ==
=== Player ===
- Primeira Divisão: 1991–92, 1994–95, 1995–96, 1996–97, 1997–98, 1998–99
- Taça de Portugal: 1993–94, 1997–98, 1999–00, 2000–01
- Supertaça Cândido de Oliveira: 1991, 1993, 1994, 1998

AEK Athens

- Greek Cup: 2001–02

Portugal U20

- FIFA World Youth Championship: 1989
