= Filgueira =

Brazilian-Portuguese footballer and coach (born 1967)

Personal information
- Full name: Luiz Carlos Filgueira
- Date of birth: 10 January 1967 (age 59)
- Place of birth: Brasília, DF, Brazil
- Height: 1.82 m (6 ft 0 in)
- Position: Defender

Senior career*
Years	Team	Apps	(Gls)
1987-1988	Brasília		
1988–1993	Chaves	151	(6)
1993–1995	Vitória de Setúbal	44	(1)
1995–1996	Marítimo	27	(1)
1996–2004	Belenenses	202	(18)

Managerial career
- 2005–2006: Belenenses (U19)
- 2006–2009: Belenenses (U17)
- 2009–2010: Belenenses (U15)
- 2010: Belenenses (U16)
- 2011: Belenenses (assistant)
- 2014–2015: Belenenses (technical coordinator)
- 2015–2016: Belenenses (women's technical coordinator)
- * Club domestic league appearances and goals

Luiz Carlos Filgueira, known as Filgueira (born 10 January 1967) is a Brazilian football coach and a former player. He also holds Portuguese citizenship.

He played 15 seasons and 400 games in the Primeira Liga for Belenenses, Chaves, Vitória de Setúbal and Marítimo.

== Career ==
Filgueira made his Primeira Liga debut for Chaves on 23 October 1988 as a starter in a 1–0 victory over Académico de Viseu.
