= Ronald Baroni =

Peruvian footballer (born 1968)

Personal information
- Full name: Ronald Pablo Baroni Ambrosi
- Date of birth: 8 April 1966 (age 60)
- Place of birth: Lima, Peru
- Height: 1.87 m (6 ft 2 in)
- Position: Striker

Youth career
- Universitario de Deportes

Senior career*
| Years | Team | Apps | (Gls) |
| 1986–1989 | Quilmes | 50 | (5) |
| 1989 | Rosario Central | | |
| 1990 | O'Higgins | 51 | (6) |
| 1991 | Deportes Concepción | 24 | (1) |
| 1992–1994 | Universitario | 58 | (23) |
| 1994–1996 | FC Porto | 14 | (1) |
| 1996 | Felgueiras | 17 | (1) |
| 1996–1997 | Ankaragücü | 32 | (7) |
| 1997 | Universitario | 23 | (2) |
| 1998–1999 | Melgar | 19 | (7) |
| 1999–2002 | Deportivo Cali | 5 | (1) |

International career
| 1993–1995 | Peru | 19 | (4) |
- * Club domestic league appearances and goals as of 31 July 2008

Ronald Pablo Baroni Ambrosi (born 8 April 1966) is a retired Peruvian international footballer who played as a striker. He played most successfully for Universitario de Deportes, where he was a prolific goalscorer.

== Club career ==
Baroni was known for his great heading ability and powerful physique. He played for a number of clubs in South America, and had spells with FC Porto and FC Felgueiras in the Portuguese Liga as well as with Ankaragücü in the Turkish Süper Lig. He ended his career playing for Colombian team Deportivo Cali.

== International career ==
Baroni made 19 appearances for the senior Peru national football team from 1993 to 1995.

== Honours ==
=== Club ===
Universitario de Deportes:

- Peruvian First Division (2): 1992, 1993

FC Porto

- 1994–95 Primeira Divisão
