= António Nogueira (footballer, born 1951) =

Portuguese footballer

Personal information
- Full name: António Manuel da Costa Nogueira
- Date of birth: 10 July 1951 (age 75)
- Place of birth: Lisbon, Portugal
- Position: Midfielder

Youth career
- 1967–1970: Atlético

Senior career*
Years	Team	Apps	(Gls)
1970–1975	Atlético	67	(4)
1975–1976	Braga	21	(4)
1976–1979	Boavista	61	(7)
1979–1981	Belenenses	51	(6)
1981–1983	Sporting CP	45	(2)
1983–1987	Águeda	96	(12)
1987–1988	União Almeirim	18	(0)
Total		359	(35)

International career
1981	Portugal	1	(1)
- * Club domestic league appearances and goals

António Manuel da Costa Nogueira (born 10 July 1951 in Lisbon) is a Portuguese retired footballer who played as a central midfielder.
