= Paulo Gomes (footballer, born 1970) =

Portuguese footballer (born 1970)

Personal information
- Full name: Paulo Jorge dos Santos Gomes
- Date of birth: 3 November 1970 (age 55)
- Place of birth: Lisbon, Portugal
- Height: 1.75 m (5 ft 9 in)
- Position: Midfielder

Senior career*
Years	Team	Apps	(Gls)
1986–1991	Lille B	49	(3)
1990–1991	→ Wasquehal (loan)	18	(0)
1991–1995	Vitória Setúbal	73	(11)
1995–1996	Belenenses	6	(1)
1996–1998	Sochaux	45	(3)
1998–1999	Niort	18	(0)
1999–2000	Amora		
- * Club domestic league appearances and goals

Paulo Jorge dos Santos Gomes (born 3 November 1970 in Lisbon) is a Portuguese former professional footballer who played as a midfielder.
