= Zé Carlos (footballer, born 1965) =

Brazilian footballer (born 1965)

Personal information
- Full name: José Carlos Pereira do Nascimento
- Date of birth: 19 March 1965 (age 61)
- Place of birth: Goiânia, Brazil
- Height: 1.83 m (6 ft 0 in)
- Position: Defender

Senior career*
Years	Team	Apps	(Gls)
1983–1989	Flamengo	93	(3)
1989–1996	Porto	79	(15)
1990–1991	→ Gil Vicente (loan)	34	(8)
1996	Vasco da Gama	24	(2)
1996–1997	Marítimo	16	(1)
Total		246	(29)
- * Club domestic league appearances and goals

José Carlos Pereira do Nascimento (born 19 March 1965), known as Zé Carlos or José Carlos, is a Brazilian former professional footballer who played as a defender.

== Career ==
Zé Carlos scored 25 goals for Porto in all competitions as a defender.

He scored in four consecutive Champions League matches in the 1992–93 season.

== Honours ==
Flamengo

- Copa União: 1987

Porto

- Primeira Liga: 1989–90, 1991–92, 1992–93, 1994–95, 1995–96
- Taça de Portugal: 1993–94
- Supertaça Cândido de Oliveira: 1993, 1994
