= Manuel Matias (footballer) =

Portuguese footballer and manager

Matias
Personal information
- Full name: Manuel Amadeu de Matos Matias
- Date of birth: 18 March 1964 (age 62)
- Place of birth: Porto, Portugal
- Height: 1.82 m (6 ft 0 in)
- Position: Defender

Team information
- Current team: Pasteleira (manager)

Youth career
- 1982–1983: Salgueiros

Senior career*
Years	Team	Apps	(Gls)
1982–1989	Salgueiros		
1989–1990	Rio Ave		
1990–1991	União da Madeira	37	(2)
1991–1995	Vitória de Guimarães	82	(3)
1995–1996	Leça	13	(1)
1996	Porto	4	(0)
1996	Vitória de Setúbal	5	(0)
1996–1997	Gil Vicente	12	(0)

Managerial career
- 2001–2002: Valonguense
- 2002–2004: Valenciano
- 2004–2005: Santana
- 2005: Portosantense
- 2005: O Elvas
- 2006–2007: Madalena
- 2007: Nogueirense
- 2008: Marítimo Graciosa
- 2008–2009: Valecambrense
- 2009: Al-Raed (assistant)
- 2010: Sanat Naft Abadan (assistant)
- 2010: Shahrdari Bandar Abbas (assistant)
- 2011: Académico de Viseu
- 2011–2012: Madalena
- 2012–2013: Sanat Naft Abadan (assistant)
- 2013: Al-Karkh (assistant)
- 2014–2015: Perafita
- 2016–2017: Almancilense
- 2017–: Pasteleira
- * Club domestic league appearances and goals

Manuel Amadeu de Matos Matias, known as Matias (born 18 March 1964, in Porto, Portugal) is a Portuguese football manager and a former player who manages Pasteleira.

He played 13 seasons and 272 games in the Primeira Liga for Salgueiros, Vitória de Guimarães, União da Madeira, Leça, Gil Vicente, Vitória de Setúbal and Porto.

== Career ==
Matias made his Primeira Liga debut for Salgueiros on 13 March 1983 in a game against Porto.

== Honours ==
Porto

- Primeira Liga: 1995–96.
