= Paulinho Santos =

Portuguese footballer

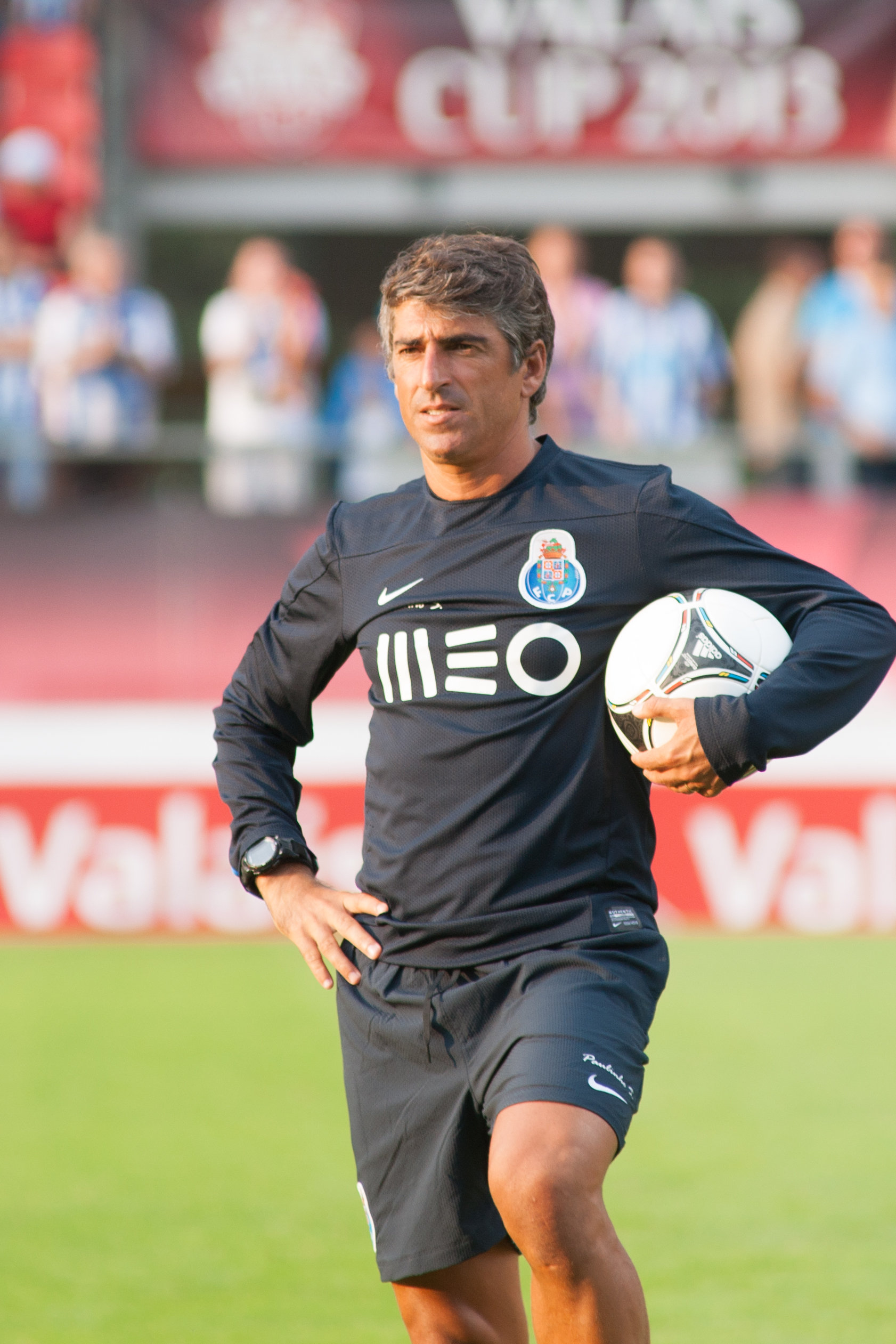
- Santos as assistant manager of Porto in 2013

Personal information
- Full name: João Paulo Maio dos Santos
- Date of birth: 21 November 1970 (age 55)
- Place of birth: Vila do Conde, Portugal
- Height: 1.70 m (5 ft 7 in)
- Position: Midfielder

Team information
- Current team: Porto B (assistant)

Youth career
- Caxineiros Unidos
- 1982–1985: Varzim
- 1986–1989: Rio Ave

Senior career*
Years	Team	Apps	(Gls)
1989–1992	Rio Ave	88	(1)
1992–2003	Porto	205	(7)
Total		293	(8)

International career
1994–1999	Portugal	30	(2)

Managerial career
- 2005–2011: Porto U19 (assistant)
- 2011–2014: Porto (assistant)
- 2014–2015: Porto B (assistant)
- 2015–2017: Porto U19 (assistant)
- 2017–: Porto B (assistant)
- * Club domestic league appearances and goals

João Paulo Maio dos Santos (born 21 November 1970), commonly known as Paulinho Santos, is a Portuguese former footballer who played mainly as a defensive midfielder. He is the current assistant coach of Liga Portugal 2 club Porto B.

He spent 11 years of his professional career with Porto, playing in several positions and winning 19 major titles whilst appearing in more than 300 official games for the club.

Santos represented Portugal at Euro 1996.

== Club career ==
Born in Vila do Conde, Santos started playing with hometown side Rio Ave, competing two seasons in the second division and one in the third. He moved in 1992 to Porto, helping the latter (often in an instrumental role) to seven Primeira Liga titles and five Taça de Portugal, having taken over from the player he idolised while growing up, António André – who had also played in his first club.

In Porto, Santos and four others became the only players in the history of Portuguese football to win five consecutive league titles from 1994 to 1999. Upon winning the 2003 edition of the UEFA Cup, he was already second-fiddle – a total of five games in his last two seasons – and retired at the end of that campaign.

A player of aggressive approach, Santos often scuffled with Benfica's João Pinto during his career. As a symbolic gesture, however, they exchanged shirts before Santos' last match, against Sporting CP (where Pinto was playing), at the Estádio das Antas, in June 2003.

Three years later, Santos began a coaching career, spending several years with Porto's various youth sides, mainly as an assistant. In 2011–12, he was promoted to the first team as Vítor Pereira's assistant.

== International career ==
Santos earned 30 caps for the Portugal national team, scoring two goals (including a solo effort in a 1–1 away draw against Austria on 11 October 1995). His first game was on 19 January 1994 in a 2–2 draw with Spain in Vigo in a friendly, and his last came on 10 February 1999 in a 0–0 draw with the Netherlands at the Parc des Princes in Paris, in another exhibition game.

Santos participated at UEFA Euro 1996, where he played as left-back, and missed Euro 2000 due to injury.

Paulinho Santos: International goals
No.	Date	Venue	Opponent	Score	Result	Competition
1	15 August 1995	Sportpark Eschen-Mauren, Eschen, Liechtenstein	Liechtenstein	0–2	0–7	Euro 1996 qualifying
2	11 October 1995	Ernst-Happel-Stadion, Vienna, Austria	Austria	1–1	1–1	Euro 1996 qualifying

== Honours ==
Porto

- Primeira Liga: 1992–93, 1994–95, 1995–96, 1996–97, 1997–98, 1998–99, 2002–03
- Taça de Portugal: 1993–94, 1997–98, 1999–2000, 2000–01, 2002–03
- Supertaça Cândido de Oliveira: 1993, 1994, 1996, 1998, 1999, 2001
- UEFA Cup: 2002–03
