= Estádio das Antas =

FC Porto's former home

Coordinates: 41°9′53.7″N 8°35′13.1″W

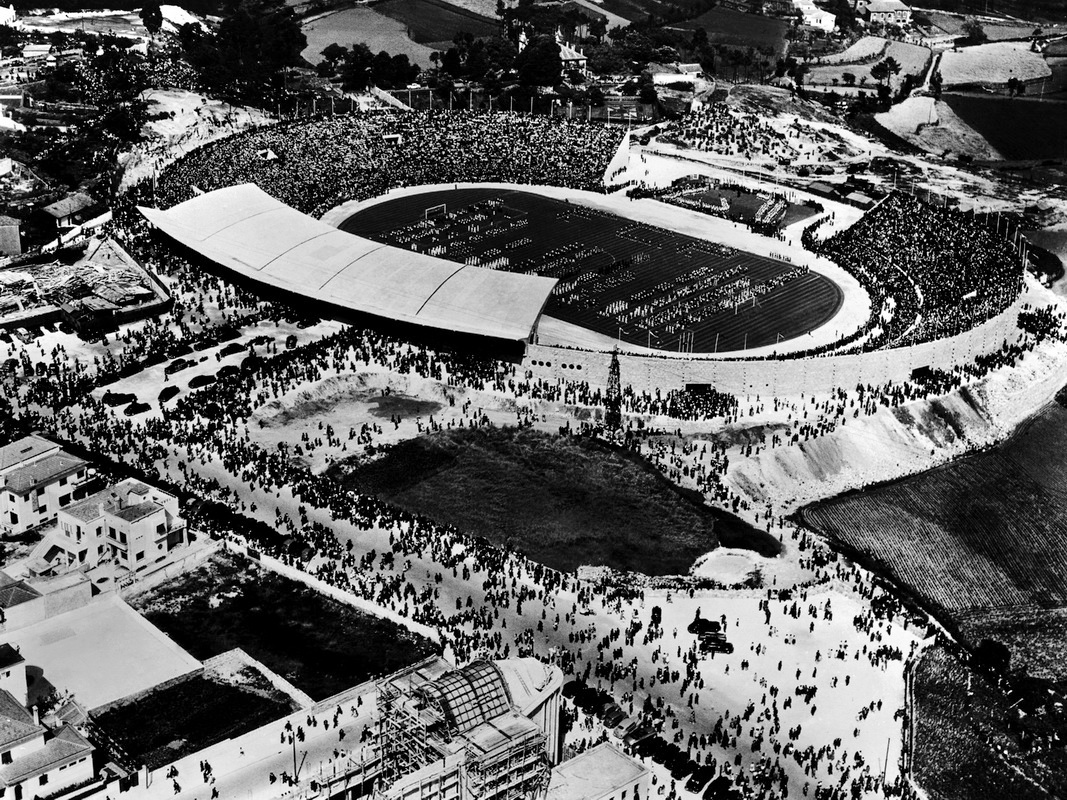
- Stadium inauguration in 1952
- Interactive map of Estádio das Antas
- Full name: Estádio do Futebol Clube do Porto
- Location: Avenida Fernão de Magalhães, Porto
- Capacity: 55,000

Construction
- Opened: 28 May 1952
- Closed: March 2004
- Architect: Oldemiro Carneiro

Tenant
- Porto (1952–2004)

The Estádio das Antas (pronounced [ɨʃˈtaðju ðɐz ˈɐ̃tɐʃ]; officially Estádio do Futebol Clube do Porto [ɨʃˈtaðju ðu futɨˈβɔl ˈkluβɨ ðu ˈpoɾtu]) was the third (and longest occupied) stadium of the Portuguese football side Porto. It was in use from 1952 to 2004, replacing the earlier Campo da Constituição, 1.6km (1 mile) to the west, and later replaced by the Estádio do Dragão, a block southeast away. As well as the stadium, it had an indoor arena and three training grounds. The club's offices were also split between the inside of the stadium and the Torre das Antas, built in front of the stadium during the 1990s. It was demolished in 2004, and the site is currently under development.

== Layout ==
The stadium was split into six different areas. The Poente and Maratona contained the best seats, while the most financially accessible were located in the Superior Norte, Superior Sul and Arquibancada. Between the Norte and Poente were seats for the away supporters. Each stand was split into different sectors. While the Poente had four, both Maratona and Arquibancada had five, and both Superiores (upper tiers) had nine, but two in Norte were reserved for away supporters. For matches, low turnout from away fans, in contrast to that expected from Porto supporters, so the away fan sector was often reduced in size by half. In the past there were other divisions, such as splitting the Superior stands between the original and the new terraces built after the 1986 capacity increase.

== Portugal national football team ==
The national team first played in the stadium in 1952 and held its last game there in 2003.

#	Date	Score	Opponent	Competition
1.	23 November 1952	1–1	Austria	Friendly
2.	22 May 1955	3–1	England	Friendly
3.	28 June 1959	3–2	East Germany	Euro 1960 First Round
4.	15 November 1964	2–1	Spain	Friendly
5.	24 June 1965	0–0	Brazil	Friendly
6.	31 October 1965	0–0	Czechoslovakia	World Cup 1966 qualification
7.	3 July 1966	1–0	Romania	Friendly
8.	12 November 1967	2–1	Norway	Euro 1968 qualifying
9.	4 May 1969	2–2	Greece	World Cup 1970 qualification
10.	12 May 1971	5–0	Denmark	Euro 1972 qualifying
11.	12 November 1975	1–1	Czechoslovakia	Euro 1976 qualifying
12.	16 October 1976	0–2	Poland	World Cup 1978 qualification
13.	15 April 1981	1–1	Bulgaria	Friendly
14.	20 June 1981	2–0	Spain	Friendly
15.	14 October 1984	2–1	Czechoslovakia	World Cup 1986 qualification
16.	11 November 1987	0–0	Switzerland	Euro 1988 qualifying
17.	17 October 1990	1–0	Netherlands	Euro 1992 qualifying
18.	20 February 1991	5–0	Malta	Euro 1992 qualifying
19.	4 September 1991	1–1	Austria	Friendly
20.	11 September 1991	1–0	Finland	Euro 1992 qualifying
21.	24 February 1993	1–3	Italy	World Cup 1994 qualification
22.	13 October 1993	1–0	Switzerland	World Cup 1994 qualification
23.	3 June 1995	3–2	Latvia	Euro 1996 qualifying
24.	3 September 1995	1–1	Northern Ireland	Euro 1996 qualifying
25.	21 February 1996	1–2	Germany	Friendly
26.	9 November 1996	1–0	Ukraine	World Cup 1998 qualification
27.	7 June 1997	2–0	Albania	World Cup 1998 qualification
28.	10 October 1998	0–1	Romania	Euro 2000 qualifying
29.	28 March 2001	2–2	Netherlands	World Cup 2002 qualification
30.	29 March 2003	2–1	Brazil	Friendly

== Milestones ==
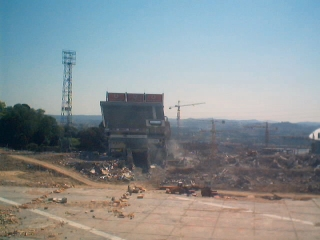
The Arquibancada was the last to fall

- 28 May 1952 – Inaugurated in the presence of Portuguese President General Craveiro Lopes.
- 1 September 1962 – Floodlights.
- 1973 – All-purpose arena completed.
- 30 April 1976 – Construction of Maratona stand, on the opposite of the main stand, and start of the Arquibancada.
- 16 December 1986 – capacity increased to 95,000 (rebaixamento). (Athletics track removed)
- Summer 1997 – All-seater (capacity reduced to 48,297 seats).
- 24 January 2004 – Final game. Although the successor Estádio do Dragão had opened in November 2003, the replanting of the turf resulted in some games returning to Estádio das Antas.
- March 2004 – Demolition began.
