= 1990 Taça de Portugal final =

- Event: 1989–90 Taça de Portugal
Estrela da Amadora	Farense
Estrela da Amadora	Farense
1	1
- Date: 27 May 1990
- Venue: Estádio Nacional, Oeiras
- Referee: Manuel Nogueira (Porto)

Replay
Estrela da Amadora	Farense
2	0
- Date: 3 June 1990
- Venue: Estádio Nacional, Oeiras
- Referee: Fortunato Azevedo (Braga)

The 1990 Taça de Portugal final was the final match of the 1989–90 Taça de Portugal, the 50th season of the Taça de Portugal, the premier Portuguese football cup competition organized by the Portuguese Football Federation (FPF). The final was played at the Estádio Nacional in Oeiras, and opposed Primeira Liga side Estrela da Amadora and Second Division side Farense. As the inaugural final match finished 1–1, the final was replayed a week later at the same venue with Os Tricolor defeating the Leões de Faro 2–0 to claim their first Taça de Portugal.

In Portugal, the final was televised live on RTP. As a result of Estrela da Amadora winning the Taça de Portugal, they qualified for the 1990 Supertaça Cândido de Oliveira where they took on 1989–90 Primeira Divisão winners Porto.

== Match ==
=== Details ===
27 May 1990

Estrela da Amadora	1–1 (a.e.t.)	Farense
Borges 93'		Cruz 115'

Estádio Nacional, Oeiras
Referee: Manuel Nogueira (Porto)

Estrela da Amadora	Farense

GK	1	(Portugal) Joaquim Melo
RB	2	(Portugal) Rui Neves
CB	3	(Brazil) Duílio (c)
CB		(Portugal) Pedro Barny
LB		(Portugal) António Caetano	Booked
RM	6	(Zaire) Basaula Lemba	Booked
CM		(Portugal) Paulo Bento
CM		(Portugal) Bobó		(substituted off) 76'
CM		(Portugal) Joaquim Rebelo
LM		(Cape Verde) Baroti
CF		(Portugal) Paulo Jorge		(substituted off) 46'
Substitutes:
MF		(Brazil) Nélson Borges		(substituted on) 76'
FW		(Portugal) Ricardo Lopes		(substituted on) 46'
Manager:
(Portugal) João Alves

GK	1	(Socialist Federal Republic of Yugoslavia) Zoran Lemajić	Booked
RB	6	(Portugal) Joaquim Pereirinha (c)
CB	2	(Portugal) Carlos Pereira		(substituted off) 93'
CB	3	(Portugal) Marco Sousa
LB	4	(Portugal) Rui Eugénio
MF	5	(Brazil) Sérgio Duarte
MF	8	(Portugal) Ricardo Formosinho		(substituted off) 65'
MF	9	(Portugal) Nelo
FW	7	(Brazil) Pitico
FW	11	(Portugal) Fernando Cruz
FW	10	(Portugal) Ademar Marques
Substitutes:
FW		(Brazil) Ricardo Narusevicius		(substituted on) 93'
FW	14	(Brazil) Mané		(substituted on) 65'
Manager:
(Spain) Paco Fortes

Match officials

- Assistant referees:
- Fourth official:

Match rules

- 90 minutes.
- 30 minutes of extra time if necessary.
- Maximum of two substitutions

== Replay ==
=== Details ===
3 June 1990

Estrela da Amadora	2–0	Farense
Bento 25'; Lopes 63'

Estádio Nacional, Oeiras
Referee: Fortunato Azevedo (Braga)

Estrela da Amadora	Farense

GK	1	(Portugal) Joaquim Melo
RB	(Portugal) Rui Neves
CB	(Brazil) Duílio (c)
CB	(Portugal) Pedro Barny
LB	(Portugal) Chico Oliveira
MF	(Brazil) Nélson Borges	(substituted off) 77'
MF	(Portugal) Paulo Bento
MF	(Portugal) Bobó
MF	(Portugal) Joaquim Rebelo
FW	(Portugal) Ricardo Lopes	(substituted off) 86'
FW	(Cape Verde) Baroti
Substitutes:
MF	(Portugal) Elias	(substituted on) 77'
MF	(Portugal) Jaime Cerqueira	(substituted on) 86'
Manager:
(Portugal) João Alves

GK	1	(Socialist Federal Republic of Yugoslavia) Zoran Lemajić
RB	(Portugal) Joaquim Pereirinha (c)
CB	(Portugal) Carlos Pereira	(substituted off) 55'
CB	(Portugal) Marco Sousa
LB	(Portugal) Rui Eugénio
MF	(Brazil) Sérgio Duarte
MF	(Portugal) Ricardo Formosinho	(substituted off) 45'
MF	(Portugal) Nelo
FW	(Brazil) Pitico
FW	(Portugal) Fernando Cruz
FW	(Portugal) Ademar Marques
Substitutes:
FW	(Brazil) Ricardo Narusevicius	(substituted on) 55'
FW	(Brazil) Mané	(substituted on) 45'
Manager:
(Spain) Paco Fortes

1989–90 Taça de Portugal Winners
Estrela da Amadora
1st Title

Match officials

- Assistant referees:
- Fourth official:

Match rules

- 90 minutes.
- 30 minutes of extra time if necessary.
- Maximum of two substitutions
