= 1988 Supertaça Cândido de Oliveira =

- Event: Supertaça Cândido de Oliveira (Portuguese Super Cup)
Vitória de Guimarães	Porto
2	0

First leg
Vitória de Guimarães	Porto
2	0
- Date: 28 September 1988
- Venue: Estádio D. Afonso Henriques, Guimarães
- Referee: Jorge Coroado (Lisbon)

Second leg
Porto	Vitória de Guimarães
0	0
- Date: 19 October 1988
- Venue: Estádio das Antas, Porto
- Referee: Pinto Correia (Lisbon)

The 1988 Supertaça Cândido de Oliveira was the 10th edition of the Supertaça Cândido de Oliveira, the annual Portuguese football season-opening match contested by the winners of the previous season's top league and cup competitions (or cup runner-up in case the league- and cup-winning club is the same). The 1988 Supertaça Cândido de Oliveira was contested over two legs, and opposed Porto and Vitória de Guimarães of the Primeira Liga. Porto qualified for the SuperCup by winning the 1987–88 Primeira Divisão and the 1987–88 Taça de Portugal, whilst Vitória de Guimarães qualified for the Supertaça by being the cup-runner.

The first leg which took place at the Estádio D. Afonso Henriques, saw Vitória de Guimarães defeat Porto 2–0. The second leg which took place at the Estádio das Antas saw a 0–0 scoreline (2–0 on aggregate), which claimed the Vimaranenses a first Supertaça.

== First leg ==
=== Details ===
28 September 1988

Vitória de Guimarães	2–0	Porto
Antônio 40'; N'Dinga 51'

Estádio D. Afonso Henriques, Guimarães
Referee: Jorge Coroado (Lisbon)

Vitória de Guimarães	Porto

GK	1	(Portugal) Neno
RB	(Portugal) Nando (c)
CB	(Portugal) Germano Santos
CB	(Brazil) Nenê
LB	(Portugal) Basílio Marques
DM	(Portugal) Soeiro
CM	(Portugal) António Carvalho
CM	(Zaire) N'Dinga Mbote
RW	(Brazil) Roldão	(substituted off) 78'
LW	(Portugal) Chiquinho Carlos	(substituted off) 81'
CF	(Brazil) Dêcio António
Substitutes:
DF	(Brazil) Renê Weber	(substituted on) 81'
MF	(Brazil) Silvinho	(substituted on) 78'
Manager:
(Brazil) Geninho

GK	1	(Portugal) Zé Beto
RB	(Portugal) João Pinto (c)
CB	(Portugal) Dito
CB	(Zaire) Kalombo N'Kongolo
LB	(Portugal) Augusto Inácio
DM	(Portugal) António André
RM	(Portugal) Jaime Magalhães
CM	(Portugal) António Sousa
LM	(Portugal) Vermelhinho	(substituted off) 60'
CF	(Portugal) Domingos
CF	(Portugal) Rui Águas
Substitutes:
MF	(Brazil) Everton Nogueira	(substituted on) 60'
Manager:
(Portugal) Quinito

Match officials

- Assistant referees:
- Fourth official:

Match rules

- 90 minutes.
- Maximum of two substitutions

== Second leg ==
=== Details ===
19 October 1988

Porto	0–0	Vitória de Guimarães

Estádio das Antas, Porto
Referee: Pinto Correia (Lisbon)

Porto	Vitória de Guimarães

GK	1	(Portugal) Zé Beto
RB	(Portugal) João Pinto (c)
CB	(Portugal) Dito
CB	(Zaire) Kalombo N'Kongolo
LB	(Brazil) Branco	(substituted off) 59'
DM	(Portugal) António André
CM	(Portugal) António Sousa
CM	(Portugal) Jaime Pacheco
AM	(Portugal) José Semedo	(substituted off) 30'
CF	(Portugal) Domingos
CF	(Portugal) Rui Águas
Substitutes:
MF	(Portugal) Rui Manuel	(substituted on) 30'
MF	(Portugal) Vermelhinho	(substituted on) 59'
Manager:
(Portugal) Quinito

GK	1	(Portugal) Neno
RB	(Portugal) Nando (c)
CB	(Portugal) Germano Santos
CB	(Brazil) Bené
LB	(Portugal) Basílio Marques
CM	(Portugal) António Carvalho
CM	(Zaire) N'Dinga Mbote
RM	(Brazil) Renê Weber
AM	(Brazil) João Baptista	(substituted off) 87'
LM	(Brazil) Silvinho	(substituted off) 76'
CF	(Portugal) Chiquinho Carlos
Substitutes:
MF	(Portugal) Soeiro	(substituted on) 87'
FW	(Brazil) Roldão	(substituted on) 76'
Manager:
(Brazil) Geninho

Match officials

- Assistant referees:
- Fourth official:

Match rules

- 90 minutes.
- Maximum of two substitutions

1988 Supertaça Cândido de Oliveira Winners
Vitória de Guimarães
1st Title
