= 1990–91 Primeira Divisão =

57th season of top-tier Portuguese football

Primeira Divisão
- Season: 1990–91
- Champions: Benfica; 29th title
- Relegated: Tirsense; Vitória de Setúbal; Estrela da Amadora; Belenenses; Nacional
- European Cup: Benfica (first round)
- Cup Winners' Cup: Porto (first round)
- UEFA Cup: Sporting CP (first round); Boavista (first round); Salgueiros (first round)
- Matches: 380
- Goals: 874 (2.3 per match)
- Top goalscorer: Rui Águas (25 goals)
- Biggest home win: Chaves 6–0 Beira-Mar (28 April 1991)
- Biggest away win: Penafiel 2–5 Sporting CP (26 August 1990)
- Highest scoring: Tirsense 4–4 Boavista (12 January 1991); Braga 6–2 Nacional (2 February 1991)

The 1990–91 Primeira Divisão was the 57th edition of top flight of Portuguese football. It started on 19 August 1990 with a match between Farense and Nacional, and ended on 26 May 1991. The league was contested by 20 clubs with Porto as the defending champions.

Benfica qualified for the 1991–92 European Cup first round, Porto qualified for the 1991–92 European Cup Winners' Cup first round, and Sporting CP, Boavista and Salgueiros qualified for the 1991–92 UEFA Cup first round; in opposite, Tirsense, Vitória de Setúbal, Estrela da Amadora, Belenenses and Nacional were relegated to the Liga de Honra. Rui Águas was the top scorer with 25 goals.

== Promotion and relegation ==
=== Teams relegated to Liga de Honra ===
- Portimonense
- Feirense

Portimonense and Feirense were consigned to the Liga de Honra following their final classification in 1989-90 season.

=== Teams promoted from Liga de Honra ===
- Salgueiros
- Gil Vicente
- Farense
- Famalicão

The other two teams were replaced by Salgueiros, Gil Vicente, Farense and Famalicão from the Liga de Honra, as the league increase from 18 to 20 teams.

== Teams ==
=== Stadia and locations ===
Location of teams in Primeira Divisão 1990-91 (Mainland)
Location of teams in Primeira Divisão 1990-91 (Madeira)

Team	Head coach	City	Stadium	1989–90 finish
Beira-Mar	(Portugal) Vítor Urbano	Aveiro	Estádio Mário Duarte	11th
Belenenses	(Belgium) Henri Depireux	Lisbon	Estádio do Restelo	6th
Benfica	(Sweden) Sven-Göran Eriksson	Lisbon	Estádio da Luz	2nd
Boavista	(Portugal) João Alves	Porto	Estádio do Bessa	8th
Braga	(Portugal) Raul Águas	Braga	Estádio Primeiro de Maio	12th
Chaves	(Portugal) Manuel Barbosa	Chaves	Estádio Municipal de Chaves	5th
Estrela da Amadora	(Portugal) Manuel Fernandes	Amadora	Estádio José Gomes	13th
Famalicão	(Brazil) Abel Braga	Vila Nova de Famalicão	Estádio Municipal 22 de Junho	4th in Segunda Divisão
Farense	(Spain) Paco Fortes	Faro	Estádio de São Luís	3rd in Segunda Divisão
Gil Vicente	(Portugal) Rodolfo Reis	Barcelos	Estádio Adelino Ribeiro Novo	2nd in Segunda Divisão
Marítimo	(Portugal) Ferreira da Costa	Funchal	Estádio dos Barreiros	10th
Nacional	(Brazil) Jair Picerni	Funchal	Estádio dos Barreiros	14th
Penafiel	(Portugal) Joaquim Teixeira	Penafiel	Estádio Municipal 25 de Abril	15th
Porto	(Portugal) Artur Jorge	Porto	Estádio das Antas	1st
Salgueiros	(Serbia and Montenegro) Zoran Filipovic	Porto	Estádio Engenheiro Vidal Pinheiro	1st in Segunda Divisão
Sporting CP	(Brazil) Marinho Peres	Lisbon	Estádio José Alvalade	3rd
Tirsense	(Portugal) Prof. Neca	Santo Tirso	Estádio Abel Alves de Figueiredo	9th
União da Madeira	(Portugal) Rui Mâncio	Funchal	Estádio dos Barreiros	16th
Vitória de Guimarães	(Brazil) Paulo Autuori	Guimarães	Estádio D. Afonso Henriques	4th
Vitória de Setúbal	(Portugal) José Romão	Setúbal	Estádio do Bonfim	7th

=== Managerial changes ===
Team	Outgoing manager	Date of vacancy	Position in table	Incoming manager	Date of appointment
Vitória de Guimarães	(Brazil) Paulo Autuori	23 September 1990	13th	(Uruguay) Pedro Rocha	24 September 1990
Marítimo	(Portugal) Ferreira da Costa	23 September 1990	17th	(Brazil) Paulo Autuori	24 September 1990
Penafiel	(Portugal) Joaquim Teixeira	30 September 1990	20th	(Portugal) Vítor Manuel	1 October 1990
Braga	(Portugal) Raul Águas	28 October 1990	19th	(Portugal) Carlos Garcia	29 October 1990
Belenenses	(Belgium) Henri Depireux	21 October 1990	19th	(Brazil) Antônio Lopes	1 November 1990
Boavista	(Portugal) João Alves	14 November 1990	5th	(Portugal) Raul Águas	9 December 1990
Vitória de Setúbal	(Portugal) José Romão	2 December 1990	19th	(Portugal) Quinito	3 December 1990
Chaves	(Portugal) Manuel Barbosa	23 December 1990	18th	(Portugal) José Romão	24 December 1990
Belenenses	(Brazil) Antônio Lopes	6 January 1991	18th	(Brazil) Moisés Andrade	7 January 1991
Vitória de Guimarães	(Uruguay) Pedro Rocha	12 January 1991	12th	(Portugal) João Alves	13 January 1991
Estrela da Amadora	(Portugal) Manuel Fernandes	27 January 1991	15th	(Portugal) Jesualdo Ferreira	28 January 1991
Nacional	(Brazil) Jair Picerni	2 February 1991	17th	(Portugal) Manuel de Oliveira	3 February 1991
Nacional	(Portugal) Manuel de Oliveira	14 April 1991	20th	(Portugal) Amaro Cavalcante	15 April 1991

== League table ==
Pos	Team	Pld	W	D	L	GF	GA	GD	Pts	Qualification or relegation
1	Benfica (C)	38	32	5	1	89	18	+71	69	Qualification to European Cup first round
2	Porto	38	31	5	2	77	22	+55	67	Qualification to Cup Winners' Cup first round (Note: Porto qualified for the Cup Winners' Cup as Portuguese Cup winners)
3	Sporting CP	38	24	8	6	58	23	+35	56	Qualification to UEFA Cup first round
4	Boavista	38	15	11	12	53	46	+7	41	Qualification to UEFA Cup first round
5	Salgueiros	38	12	12	14	32	48	−16	36	Qualification to UEFA Cup first round
6	Beira-Mar	38	12	12	14	40	49	−9	36	
7	Braga	38	13	8	17	42	45	−3	34	
8	Chaves	38	10	14	14	49	52	−3	34	
9	Vitória de Guimarães	38	12	10	16	31	40	−9	34	
10	Marítimo	38	14	6	18	46	47	−1	34	
11	Farense	38	12	10	16	37	48	−11	34	
12	União da Madeira	38	9	15	14	30	51	−21	33	
13	Gil Vicente	38	11	11	16	34	46	−12	33	
14	Famalicão	38	11	11	16	33	41	−8	33	
15	Penafiel	38	12	9	17	34	51	−17	33	
16	Tirsense (R)	38	10	13	15	39	50	−11	33	Relegation to Segunda Divisão de Honra
17	Vitória de Setúbal (R)	38	11	10	17	53	53	0	32	Relegation to Segunda Divisão de Honra
18	Estrela da Amadora (R)	38	9	14	15	37	46	−9	32	Relegation to Segunda Divisão de Honra
19	Belenenses (R)	38	10	9	19	27	38	−11	29	Relegation to Segunda Divisão de Honra
20	Nacional (R)	38	8	11	19	33	60	−27	27	Relegation to Segunda Divisão de Honra

Source: Primeira Divisão
Rules for classification: 1st points, 2nd head-to-head, 3rd goals average
(C) Champions; (R) Relegated

== Results ==
Home \ Away	BEM	BEL	BEN	BOA	BRA	CHA	EST	FAM	FAR	GVI	MAR	NAC	PEN	POR	SAL	SCP	TIR	UNI	VGU	VSE
Beira-Mar		1–1	0–1	2–0	1–0	2–1	2–1	1–0	0–0	0–0	1–0	1–0	3–0	1–2	1–1	0–1	3–2	4–1	1–0	1–0
Belenenses	2–2		0–2	2–0	1–1	2–0	2–1	0–0	1–0	3–0	1–2	2–3	1–0	0–1	2–0	0–1	1–1	0–1	1–0	2–1
Benfica	3–0	2–0		1–1	2–0	1–0	4–0	1–0	2–0	3–0	3–1	3–0	2–0	2–2	4–0	1–1	5–0	4–1	2–0	2–0
Boavista	1–1	1–0	1–2		2–0	2–0	3–0	2–2	2–0	2–1	1–0	4–0	5–0	1–1	0–0	0–3	1–1	1–1	0–0	2–1
Braga	2–1	2–0	1–3	5–2		1–1	1–0	1–0	4–2	1–2	3–1	6–2	2–0	0–1	3–0	0–1	1–2	1–2	0–0	2–3
Chaves	6–0	2–0	0–3	0–1	0–1		1–3	3–1	4–2	1–1	3–1	1–1	2–2	1–2	1–0	2–2	1–1	2–1	1–0	4–3
Estrela da Amadora	2–0	1–0	1–4	1–0	2–0	0–0		1–1	0–1	5–2	0–2	3–0	1–0	1–2	1–1	1–2	1–1	0–0	2–0	2–2
Famalicão	2–1	3–0	1–3	0–3	4–1	1–1	1–1		2–3	1–0	1–0	0–0	0–0	0–0	2–1	0–1	2–1	1–0	2–1	0–0
Farense	3–2	0–0	2–2	1–2	0–0	2–0	3–0	1–0		2–0	1–2	2–1	2–0	0–1	5–0	0–1	2–0	0–0	2–0	2–0
Gil Vicente	0–0	2–1	2–3	4–1	0–0	2–2	1–1	1–0	2–1		2–0	2–0	0–0	0–2	0–0	2–1	0–0	1–1	0–0	1–0
Marítimo	2–2	1–0	0–2	1–1	0–1	2–2	1–1	1–0	3–1	1–0		1–0	1–0	1–2	0–2	1–0	2–2	2–1	1–2	2–1
Nacional	0–0	0–1	0–2	1–1	1–0	2–0	0–0	1–3	3–1	2–1	0–0		1–1	2–3	1–1	0–2	0–0	1–2	3–1	1–1
Penafiel	3–0	1–0	1–1	2–1	2–0	2–0	2–1	0–0	4–1	0–2	1–1	1–2		0–0	1–0	2–5	1–0	3–0	1–0	2–1
Porto	2–1	0–0	0–2	3–1	2–0	3–1	2–0	2–0	1–0	2–0	3–1	1–2	2–0		3–0	2–0	2–1	5–0	5–0	4–1
Salgueiros	2–1	0–0	0–2	2–0	0–0	1–0	2–1	3–1	1–0	1–0	0–0	1–1	1–0	1–3		0–0	1–0	3–0	0–0	1–0
Sporting CP	2–0	1–0	0–2	2–1	3–0	1–1	1–0	2–0	0–1	2–0	0–0	3–0	2–0	0–2	5–1		1–0	2–0	3–0	1–0
Tirsense	2–0	1–0	1–3	4–4	1–0	0–2	1–1	2–0	3–2	1–2	1–0	3–1	2–2	1–2	2–1	0–0		0–1	1–0	1–1
União da Madeira	2–2	1–1	0–2	0–2	1–1	1–1	0–0	2–1	0–0	1–0	1–1	1–0	3–0	1–3	2–2	0–2	0–0		0–0	1–1
Vitória de Guimarães	1–1	1–0	0–2	0–1	0–0	1–1	0–0	0–1	2–0	2–0	1–0	3–1	3–0	0–2	2–1	1–1	1–0	2–0		4–2
Vitória de Setúbal	1–1	2–0	2–0	2–0	0–1	1–1	1–1	0–0	2–1	3–1	5–2	2–0	3–0	0–2	3–1	3–3	3–0	0–1	2–3	

Source: Foradejogo (in Portuguese)
Legend: Blue = home team win; Yellow = draw; Red = away team win.

== Top goalscorers ==
Rank	Player	Club	Goals
1	(Portugal) Rui Águas	Benfica	25
2	(Portugal) Domingos	Porto	24
3	(Portugal) Fernando Gomes	Sporting	22
4	(Nigeria) Ricky	Estrela da Amadora	15
5	(Nigeria) Yekini	Vitória de Setúbal	13
5	(Brazil) Jorge Andrade	Boavista	13
7	(Brazil) Geraldão	Porto	12
7	(Serbia) Curcic	Farense	12
9	(Croatia) Rudi	Chaves	11
9	(Brazil) Marlon Brandão	Boavista	11
9	(Portugal) Tozé	Salgueiros	11

== Attendances ==
#	Club	Average
1	Benfica	42,368
2	Porto	32,947
3	Sporting	30,368
4	Beira-Mar	11,605
5	Braga	10,368
6	Vitória SC	10,105
7	Boavista	10,000
8	Famalicão	9,842
9	Farense	9,553
10	Marítimo	8,842
11	Vitória FC	8,184
12	Estrela	8,026
13	Os Belenenses	7,658
14	Gil Vicente	7,368
15	Penafiel	7,316
16	Tirsense	6,132
17	Salgueiros	5,789
18	Chaves	5,737
19	CD Nacional	4,684
20	CF União	3,247
