= 1990 Supertaça Cândido de Oliveira =

- Event: Supertaça Cândido de Oliveira (Portuguese Super Cup)
Estrela da Amadora	Porto
2	4

First leg
Estrela da Amadora	Porto
2	1
- Date: 7 August 1990
- Venue: Estádio José Gomes, Amadora
- Referee: Carlos Valente (Setúbal)

Second leg
Porto	Estrela da Amadora
3	0
- Date: 14 August 1990
- Venue: Estádio das Antas, Porto
- Referee: Veiga Trigo (Beja)

The 1990 Supertaça Cândido de Oliveira was the 12th edition of the Supertaça Cândido de Oliveira, the annual Portuguese football season-opening match contested by the winners of the previous season's top league and cup competitions (or cup runner-up in case the league- and cup-winning club is the same). The 1990 Supertaça Cândido de Oliveira was contested over two legs, and opposed Estrela da Amadora and Porto of the Primeira Liga. Porto qualified for the SuperCup by winning the 1989–90 Primeira Divisão, whilst Estrela da Amadora qualified for the Supertaça by winning the 1989–90 Taça de Portugal.

The first leg which took place at the Estádio José Gomes, saw Estrela da Amadora defeat Porto 2–1. The second leg which took place at the Estádio das Antas saw Porto defeat Estrela da Amadora 3–0 (4–2 on aggregate), which claimed the Portistas a fifth Supertaça.

== First leg ==
=== Details ===
7 August 1990

Estrela da Amadora	2–1	Porto
Miranda 61'; Baroti 78'		Geraldão 75'

Estádio José Gomes, Amadora
Referee: Carlos Valente (Setúbal)

Estrela da Amadora	Porto

GK	1	(Portugal) Joaquim Melo
RB	2	(Portugal) Rui Neves
CB	3	(Brazil) Duílio (c)
CB		(Portugal) Valério Pereira
LB		(Portugal) Álvaro Magalhães
DM		(Portugal) Paulo Bento
CM		(Portugal) Joaquim Rebelo
CM		(Portugal) Marito	(substituted off) 76'
CM		(Portugal) António Miranda	(substituted off) 85'
CF		(Angola) Abel Campos
CF	9	(Cape Verde) Baroti
Substitutes:
DF		(Portugal) Dimas	(substituted on) 76'
MF		(Portugal) Francisco Agatão	(substituted on) 85'
Manager:
(Portugal) Manuel Fernandes

GK	1	(Portugal) Vítor Baía
RB	2	(Portugal) João Pinto (c)
CB	4	(Brazil) Aloísio
CB	5	(Brazil) Geraldão
LB	3	(Brazil) Branco
DM	7	(Portugal) António André
CM		(Portugal) José Semedo
AM		(Portugal) Abílio
RW		(Portugal) Jaime Magalhães	(substituted off) 46'
LW		(Portugal) Jorge Couto
CF	9	(France) Stéphane Paille
Substitutes:
FW	15	(Bulgaria) Emil Kostadinov	(substituted on) 46'
Manager:
(Portugal) Artur Jorge

Match officials

- Assistant referees:
- Fourth official:

Match rules

- 90 minutes.
- Maximum of two substitutions

== Second leg ==
=== Details ===
14 August 1990

Porto	3–0	Estrela da Amadora
Paille 8'; Semedo 81'; J. Couto 85'

Estádio das Antas, Porto
Referee: Veiga Trigo (Beja)

Porto	Estrela da Amadora

GK	1	(Portugal) Vítor Baía
RB	2	(Portugal) João Pinto (c)	(substituted off) 79'
CB	4	(Brazil) Aloísio
CB	5	(Brazil) Geraldão
LB	3	(Brazil) Branco
DM	7	(Portugal) António André
CM	10	(Portugal) José Semedo
AM	11	(Algeria) Rabah Madjer	(substituted off) 73'
RW	6	(Portugal) Jaime Magalhães
LW	8	(Bulgaria) Emil Kostadinov
CF	9	(France) Stéphane Paille
Substitutes:
MF		(Portugal) Abílio	(substituted on) 79'
MF	16	(Portugal) Jorge Couto	(substituted on) 73'
Manager:
(Portugal) Artur Jorge

GK	1	(Portugal) Joaquim Melo
RB	2	(Portugal) Rui Neves
CB	3	(Brazil) Duílio (c)
CB		(Portugal) Valério Pereira
LB		(Portugal) Álvaro Magalhães
DM		(Portugal) Paulo Bento
CM		(Portugal) Joaquim Rebelo
CM		(Portugal) Marito
CM		(Portugal) António Miranda		(substituted off) 46'
CF	7	(Angola) Abel Campos	Sent off (straight red)
CF	9	(Cape Verde) Baroti		(substituted off) 69'
Substitutes:
DF		(Portugal) Dimas		(substituted on) 46'
FW		(Nigeria) Ricky		(substituted on) 69'
Manager:
(Portugal) Manuel Fernandes

Match officials

- Assistant referees:
- Fourth official:

Match rules

- 90 minutes.
- Maximum of two substitutions

1990 Supertaça Cândido de Oliveira Winners
Porto
5th Title
