= 1989–90 Primeira Divisão =

56th season of top-tier Portuguese football

Primeira Divisão
- Season: 1989–90
- Champions: Porto; 11th title
- Relegated: Portimonense; Feirense
- European Cup: Porto (first round)
- Cup Winners' Cup: Estrela da Amadora (first round)
- UEFA Cup: Benfica (first round); Sporting CP (first round); Vitória de Guimarães (first round)
- Matches: 306
- Goals: 666 (2.18 per match)
- Top goalscorer: Magnusson (33 goals)
- Biggest home win: Benfica 7–0 Penafiel (14 October 1989); Porto 7–0 Tirsense (26 November 1989)
- Biggest away win: Braga 0–4 Benfica (3 December 1989)
- Highest scoring: Benfica 7–0 Penafiel (14 October 1989); Porto 7–0 Tirsense (26 November 1989)

The 1989–90 Primeira Divisão was the 56th edition of top flight of Portuguese football. It started on 20 August 1989 with a match between Chaves and Penafiel, and ended on 20 May 1990. The league was contested by 18 clubs with Benfica as the defending champions.

Porto qualified for the 1990–91 European Cup first round, Estrela da Amadora qualified for the 1990–91 European Cup Winners' Cup first round, and Benfica, Sporting CP and Vitória de Guimarães qualified for the 1990–91 UEFA Cup first round. Portimonense and Feirense were relegated to the Liga de Honra. Magnusson was the top scorer with 33 goals.

== Promotion and relegation ==
=== Teams relegated to Liga de Honra ===
- Espinho
- Fafe
- Farense
- Leixões
- Académico de Viseu

Espinho, Fafe, Farense, Leixões and Académico de Viseu were consigned to the Liga de Honra following their final classification in 1988–89 season.

=== Teams promoted from Liga de Honra ===
- União da Madeira
- Feirense
- Tirsense

The other five teams were replaced by União da Madeira, Feirense and Tirsense from the Liga de Honra, as the league dropped from 20 to 18 teams.

== Teams ==
=== Stadia and locations ===
Location of teams in Primeira Divisão 1989–90 (Mainland)
Location of teams in Primeira Divisão 1989–90 (Madeira)

Team	Head coach	City	Stadium	1988–89 finish
Beira-Mar	(Belgium) Jean Thissen	Aveiro	Estádio Mário Duarte	15th
Belenenses	(Bulgaria) Hristo Mladenov	Lisbon	Estádio do Restelo	7th
Benfica	(Sweden) Sven-Göran Eriksson	Lisbon	Estádio da Luz	1st
Boavista	(Portugal) Raul Águas	Porto	Estádio do Bessa	3rd
Braga	(Portugal) Vítor Manuel	Braga	Estádio Primeiro de Maio	6th
Chaves	(Portugal) José Romão	Chaves	Estádio Municipal de Chaves	13th
Estrela da Amadora	(Portugal) João Alves	Amadora	Estádio José Gomes	8th
Feirense	(Portugal) Henrique Nunes	Santa Maria da Feira	Estádio Marcolino de Castro	2nd in Segunda Divisão
Marítimo	(Portugal) Quinito	Funchal	Estádio dos Barreiros	12th
Nacional	(Portugal) Fernando Pires	Funchal	Estádio dos Barreiros	10th
Penafiel	(Portugal) Carlos Alhinho	Penafiel	Estádio Municipal 25 de Abril	14th
Portimonense	(Portugal) José Torres	Portimão	Estádio Municipal de Portimão	11th
Porto	(Portugal) Artur Jorge	Porto	Estádio das Antas	2nd
Sporting	(Portugal) Manuel José	Lisbon	Estádio José Alvalade	4th
Tirsense	(Portugal) Prof. Neca	Santo Tirso	Estádio Abel Alves de Figueiredo	3rd in Segunda Divisão
União da Madeira	(Portugal) Rui Mâncio	Funchal	Estádio dos Barreiros	1st in Segunda Divisão
Vitória de Guimarães	(Brazil) Paulo Autuori	Guimarães	Estádio D. Afonso Henriques	9th
Vitória de Setúbal	(Portugal) Manuel Fernandes	Setúbal	Estádio do Bonfim	5th

=== Managerial changes ===
Team	Outgoing manager	Date of vacancy	Position in table	Incoming manager	Date of appointment
Penafiel	(Portugal) Carlos Alhinho	22 October 1989	18th	(Portugal) José Augusto	23 October 1989
Belenenses	(Bulgaria) Hristo Mladenov	29 October 1989	11th	(Brazil) Moisés Andrade	5 November 1989
Boavista	(Portugal) Raul Águas	5 November 1989	10th	(Portugal) Manuel Barbosa	6 November 1989
Marítimo	(Portugal) Quinito	5 November 1989	13th	(Portugal) Ferreira da Costa	3 December 1989
Portimonense	(Portugal) José Torres	19 November 1989	17th	(Portugal) Quinito	20 November 1989
Nacional	(Portugal) Fernando Pires	26 November 1989	18th	(Brazil) Jair Picerni	4 December 1989
Sporting	(Portugal) Manuel José	10 December 1989	4th	(Portugal) Vítor Damas	11 December 1989
Sporting	(Portugal) Vítor Damas	23 December 1989	4th	(Portugal) Raul Águas	24 December 1989
Beira-Mar	(Belgium) Jean Thissen	28 January 1990	12th	(Portugal) Vítor Urbano	29 January 1990
Portimonense	(Portugal) Quinito	4 March 1990	18th	(Portugal) Manuel de Oliveira	5 March 1990
Penafiel	(Portugal) José Augusto	14 April 1990	16th	(Portugal) Joaquim Teixeira	15 April 1990
Vitória de Setúbal	(Portugal) Manuel Fernandes	21 April 1990	5th	(Portugal) Conhé	25 April 1990

== League standings ==
Pos	Team	Pld	W	D	L	GF	GA	GD	Pts	Qualification or relegation
1	Porto (C)	34	27	5	2	72	16	+56	59	Qualification to European Cup first round
2	Benfica	34	23	9	2	76	18	+58	55	Qualification to UEFA Cup first round
3	Sporting CP	34	17	12	5	42	24	+18	46	Qualification to UEFA Cup first round
4	Vitória de Guimarães	34	17	11	6	46	28	+18	45	Qualification to UEFA Cup first round
5	Chaves	34	12	14	8	38	38	0	38	
6	Belenenses	34	16	4	14	32	33	−1	36	
7	Vitória de Setúbal	34	14	8	12	39	34	+5	36	
8	Boavista	34	13	8	13	49	36	+13	34	
9	Tirsense	34	7	16	11	21	32	−11	30	
10	Marítimo	34	7	15	12	25	38	−13	29	
11	Beira-Mar	34	10	9	15	22	39	−17	29	
12	Braga	34	8	12	14	32	41	−9	28	
13	Estrela da Amadora	34	10	8	16	35	34	+1	28	Qualification to Cup Winners' Cup first round (Note: Estrela da Amadora qualified for the Cup Winners' Cup as Portuguese Cup winners)
14	Nacional	34	7	14	13	34	46	−12	28	
15	Penafiel	34	9	8	17	24	50	−26	26	
16	União da Madeira	34	5	14	15	24	45	−21	24	
17	Portimonense (R)	34	7	7	20	30	57	−27	21	Relegation to Segunda Divisão de Honra
18	Feirense (R)	34	5	10	19	25	57	−32	20	Relegation to Segunda Divisão de Honra

Source: Primeira Divisão
Rules for classification: 1st points, 2nd head-to-head, 3rd goals average
(C) Champions; (R) Relegated

== Results ==
Home \ Away	BEM	BEL	BEN	BOA	BRA	CHA	EST	FEI	MAR	NAC	PEN	PTM	POR	SCP	TIR	UNI	VGU	VSE
Beira-Mar		1–0	0–2	2–0	3–1	0–0	1–0	1–0	0–0	1–0	0–0	0–0	0–1	0–1	1–0	1–0	0–2	0–0
Belenenses	1–0		0–0	1–0	2–1	3–0	2–1	1–0	1–0	1–0	2–1	1–0	1–0	1–0	1–0	2–0	4–0	0–0
Benfica	5–0	1–0		1–1	3–1	2–0	2–0	3–1	4–0	1–1	7–0	5–0	0–0	2–1	1–0	4–2	2–0	5–1
Boavista	1–2	4–2	1–0		2–0	2–0	2–0	4–0	1–1	4–1	3–0	1–0	0–1	0–0	0–0	5–1	1–2	1–2
Braga	2–0	3–0	0–4	0–0		1–1	1–0	3–1	3–0	2–0	3–0	3–1	1–2	1–1	1–1	1–1	1–3	0–3
Chaves	2–1	1–1	0–0	1–0	1–1		0–1	0–0	2–1	3–3	3–2	4–2	1–2	2–1	3–0	2–1	0–0	2–0
Estrela da Amadora	3–1	4–1	0–1	3–2	0–0	1–1		3–0	3–0	3–0	0–1	4–2	1–1	0–0	2–0	1–1	1–2	0–1
Feirense	1–2	1–0	1–1	1–2	3–1	1–2	1–1		2–0	1–1	2–1	1–1	1–4	1–2	0–0	1–0	0–0	0–0
Marítimo	1–0	0–0	1–1	3–1	1–1	0–0	1–0	2–0		2–2	2–1	1–1	0–0	1–2	0–0	1–0	2–3	0–0
Nacional	2–0	3–0	1–4	2–1	0–0	1–1	1–0	3–0	0–0		1–1	1–1	0–3	1–1	0–0	0–0	0–0	3–1
Penafiel	0–0	1–0	0–4	2–1	1–0	0–0	1–0	2–0	0–1	0–2		2–0	0–2	0–0	0–0	0–0	2–1	1–0
Portimonense	2–2	3–1	2–3	0–2	1–0	0–1	1–0	2–0	2–2	2–1	2–1		0–1	0–2	1–1	2–0	1–3	0–1
Porto	2–2	3–0	1–0	3–1	3–0	4–1	2–0	3–1	4–1	2–0	4–0	4–0		3–2	7–0	1–0	1–1	1–0
Sporting CP	2–0	1–0	0–1	2–2	0–0	1–1	2–0	3–2	1–0	2–0	2–1	1–0	1–0		1–0	2–0	3–2	2–0
Tirsense	2–0	1–0	1–1	1–1	0–0	0–1	0–0	1–1	1–0	1–0	1–1	1–0	1–2	1–1		3–0	0–0	2–1
União da Madeira	4–1	1–0	0–3	1–1	0–0	1–1	1–2	1–1	0–0	3–2	2–1	2–0	0–2	0–0	0–0		1–1	1–1
Vitória de Guimarães	2–0	2–1	1–1	0–1	2–0	1–0	0–0	4–0	0–0	2–2	2–0	2–0	0–2	1–1	1–0	3–0		2–1
Vitória de Setúbal	0–0	0–2	1–2	1–0	1–0	4–1	2–1	2–0	2–1	3–0	3–1	3–1	0–1	1–1	4–2	0–0	0–1	

Source: Foradejogo (in Portuguese)
Legend: Blue = home team win; Yellow = draw; Red = away team win.

== Top goalscorers ==
Rank	Player	Club	Goals
1	(Sweden) Magnusson	Benfica	33
2	(Portugal) Rui Águas	Porto	18
3	(Bulgaria) Getov	Portimonense	15
4	(Algeria) Madjer	Porto	13
5	(Nigeria) Ricky	Estrela da Amadora	12
5	(Brazil) Isaías	Boavista	12
7	(Bulgaria) Mladenov	Vitória de Setúbal	11
7	(Brazil) Jorge Andrade	Boavista	11
7	(Mozambique) Chiquinho Conde	Belenenses	11
7	(Belgium) Demol	Porto	11

== Attendances ==
#	Club	Average
1	Porto	43,824
2	Benfica	40,588
3	Sporting	29,294
4	Vitória SC	15,412
5	Braga	12,588
6	Beira-Mar	12,294
7	Boavista	10,647
8	Vitória FC	10,412
9	Os Belenenses	8,794
10	Tirsense	8,471
11	Marítimo	8,265
12	Estrela da Amadora	7,471
13	Feirense	7,471
14	Penafiel	6,294
15	Portimonense	5,882
16	Chaves	5,765
17	CD Nacional	5,029
18	CF União	2,741
