= N'Dinga Mbote =

Congolese footballer

Personal information
- Full name: N'Dinga Mbote Amily
- Date of birth: 11 September 1966 (age 60)
- Place of birth: Kinshasa, DR Congo
- Height: 1.76 m (5 ft 9 in)
- Position: Midfielder

Senior career*
Years	Team	Apps	(Gls)
1983–1986	Vita Club		
1986–1996	Vitória Guimarães	285	(16)
1998–2001	Vita Club		

International career
1988–1996	Zaire	14	(1)
- * Club domestic league appearances and goals

N'Dinga Mbote Amily (born 11 September 1966) is a Congolese retired footballer who played as a central midfielder.

== Club career ==
Born in Kinshasa, Zaire, Mbote arrived at Vitória S.C. in Portugal at the age of only 20, signing from AS Vita Club. He played with the Minho side for one full decade, always competing in the Primeira Liga and sharing teams with countryman Basaula Lemba during five seasons.

N'Dinga (as he was known in Portugal), helped Vitória to five UEFA Cup qualifications, his best season being 1990–91 when he played in all 38 games – the league was then composed of 20 teams – and scored two goals, for a final ninth place.

Mbote was the centerpiece of a scandal in Portuguese football that involved his team and Académica de Coimbra: after the 1987–88 campaign, Académica was relegated following an unsuccessful protest regarding an irregular use of the player. Following a lengthy judicial battle, the two clubs ceased their relations for decades.

== International career ==
Mbote played for the Zaire national team during one decade, his debut coming in 1988. He appeared in three matches at the 1994 Africa Cup of Nations.
