= Ricardo Lopes (footballer, born 1968) =

Portuguese footballer (born 1968)

Personal information
- Full name: Ricardo Jorge Freitas Lopes
- Date of birth: 31 December 1968 (age 57)
- Place of birth: Luanda, Angola
- Height: 1.73 m (5 ft 8 in)
- Position: Winger

Youth career
- 1982–1987: Boavista

Senior career*
Years	Team	Apps	(Gls)
1986–1987	Boavista	4	(0)
1987–1988	Leixões	37	(13)
1988–1990	Estrela Amadora	17	(1)
1990–1991	Penafiel	13	(1)
1991–1992	Leixões	29	(4)
1992–1994	Estrela Amadora	57	(17)
1994–1998	Vitória Guimarães	61	(10)
1998–2000	Chaves	31	(7)
Total		249	(53)

International career
1987	Portugal U21	1	(0)
- * Club domestic league appearances and goals

Ricardo Jorge Freitas Lopes (born 31 December 1968) is a Portuguese former footballer who played as a winger.

== Club career ==
Born in Luanda, Portuguese Angola to Portuguese settlers, Lopes spent ten seasons in the latter nation's Primeira Liga, amassing totals of 137 matches and 25 goals in representation of Boavista FC, C.F. Estrela da Amadora (two spells), F.C. Penafiel, Vitória S.C. and G.D. Chaves.

In 1990, whilst at the service of Estrela, he helped the club win its first and only Taça de Portugal, scoring in the replay match in a 2–0 win against S.C. Farense.

== Honours ==
Estrela Amadora

- Taça de Portugal: 1989–90
