= António Carvalho =

António Carvalho may refer to:

- António Carvalho (footballer)
- António Carvalho (cyclist)
- Antonio Carvalho, Canadian mixed martial artist
- Antônio de Carvalho, Brazilian sprinter
