= Henrique Nunes =

Portuguese footballer (born 1955)

Personal information
- Full name: Henrique Nunes da Silva
- Date of birth: 21 January 1955 (age 71)
- Place of birth: Santa Maria da Feira, Portugal
- Position: Midfielder

Youth career
- 1971–1973: Feirense

Senior career*
Years	Team	Apps	(Gls)
1976–1985	Feirense		

Managerial career
- 1987–1990: Feirense
- 1990–1991: Sanjoanense
- 1991–1992: Feirense
- 1992–1994: Aves
- 1994: Penafiel
- 1994–1997: Feirense
- 1997–1998: Gil Vicente
- 1998–1999: Marco
- 1999: Feirense
- 2000–2001: Covilhã
- 2001–2002: Sanjoanense
- 2002–2003: Feirense
- 2003–2005: Gondomar
- 2006–2007: Feirense
- 2007–2009: Aves
- 2009–2011: Arouca
- 2012: Feirense
- 2013: Oliveirense
- 2016–2017: Benfica de Macau
- 2018–2019: Águeda
- 2019–2020: Arouca
- 2020–2021: Lusitânia Lourosa
- 2022: São João de Ver
- 2024: Sanjoanense
- * Club domestic league appearances and goals

Henrique Nunes da Silva (born 21 January 1955) is a Portuguese former football player and manager.

He spent his entire playing career with Feirense and had seven spells managing the club, including his only Primeira Liga experience in 1989–90 and 2012. He won promotion from the third tier three times, including as champions with Arouca in 2009–10. In his only spell with a foreign club, he won two consecutive Liga de Elite titles and the Taça de Macau with Benfica de Macau.

== Career ==
=== Early career and Feirense ===
Born in Santa Maria da Feira, Nunes spent his entire playing career as a midfielder for hometown club Feirense. In 1989–90, after winning promotion, he managed the club in the Primeira Liga. He spent the rest of the decade and the first half of the 2000s with Sanjoanense, Aves, Penafiel, Gil Vicente, Marco, Covilhã and Gondomar, mainly in the second tier. In 2003 and 2004, he won promotion from the third tier in consecutive seasons as regional champions with Feirense and Gondomar.

In February 2006, Nunes was hired as Feirense manager for the sixth time, with the club fighting relegation with 13 games remaining of the second-tier season. He left by mutual consent on 2 October 2007, and took over at Aves in the same division, where his exit in May 2009 followed a fallout with the squad.

=== Arouca ===
In 2009–10, Nunes won promotion to the second tier for the first time in the history of Arouca, as champions. His contract was extended in June 2010, and May 2011, but he left by mutual consent on 20 September after four games of the new season.

=== Primeira Liga and Oliveirense ===
On 2 April 2012, Nunes returned to Feirense, who were in last place in the top flight with five games remaining. His first game back was a 2–2 draw away to Rio Ave on 7 April. After relegation, and starting the new season with three defeats, his contract was rescinded on 23 August.

Nunes was dismissed by Oliveirense on 3 December 2018. Five consecutive defeats had put the club from Oliveira de Azeméis into 20th position.

=== Benfica de Macau ===
Nunes was hired in the first foreign job of his career in December 2015, agreeing to join Benfica de Macau at the age of 60. He was recommended to the job by a friend in the special administrative region, and beat the language barrier through local players in the former Portuguese colony who could translate to Chinese for the rest of the squad. He won the Liga de Elite in both of his seasons, as well as the Taça de Macau in 2017, matching the club's Lisbon namesake in winning a double.

=== Later career ===
In June 2018, Nunes returned home and was hired at the 11th Portuguese club of his career, Águeda in the Campeonato de Portugal. A year later, he went back to Arouca, in the same division. He won promotion in 2019–20 after the Portuguese Football Federation curtailed the season during the COVID-19 pandemic, but left the club. After one year at Lusitânia Lourosa, he joined São João de Ver in the new Liga 3 in February 2022.

Nunes was appointed at Sanjoanense, also in the third tier, in February 2024. Having avoided relegation by winning and drawing four games each of ten final fixtures, the 69-year-old left in May.

== Honours ==
Feirense

- Segunda Divisão Zona Centro: 2002–03

Gondomar

- Segunda Divisão Zona Norte: 2003–04

Arouca

- Segunda Divisão: 2009–10

Benfica de Macau

- Liga de Elite: 2016, 2017
- Taça de Macau: 2017
