= Joaquim Melo =

Portuguese footballer

Personal information
- Full name: Joaquim Alberto Castanheira de Melo
- Date of birth: 11 September 1949 (age 77)
- Place of birth: Coimbra, Portugal
- Position: Goalkeeper

Youth career
- Académica
- 1964–1967: União Coimbra

Senior career*
Years	Team	Apps	(Gls)
1967–1973	União Coimbra	27	(0)
1973–1977	Belenenses	85	(0)
1977–1981	Vitória Guimarães	88	(0)
1981–1984	Sporting CP	9	(0)
1984–1985	Belenenses	16	(0)
1985–1986	União Madeira	33	(0)
1986–1991	Estrela Amadora	110	(0)
Total		368	(0)
- * Club domestic league appearances and goals

Joaquim Alberto Castanheira de Melo (born 11 September 1949) is a Portuguese former footballer who played as a goalkeeper.

== Club career ==
Born in Coimbra, Melo appeared in 276 Primeira Liga matches over 15 seasons, representing in the competition C.F. União de Coimbra, C.F. Os Belenenses (two stints), Vitória de Guimarães, Sporting CP and C.F. Estrela da Amadora. In 1981–82, he contributed two appearances to help Sporting win the national championship as backup to Ferenc Mészáros.

Melo was in goal during the 1990 Taça de Portugal Final, as Estrela won its first and only trophy after defeating S.C. Farense 2–0 in the replay match. After 24 games in the following league campaign (the team finished third from bottom and could not avoid relegation), he retired at the age of 41.

== Honours ==
Sporting

- Primeira Liga: 1981–82

Estrela da Amadora

- Taça de Portugal: 1989–90
