= Geninho =

Brazilian footballer and manager (born 1948)

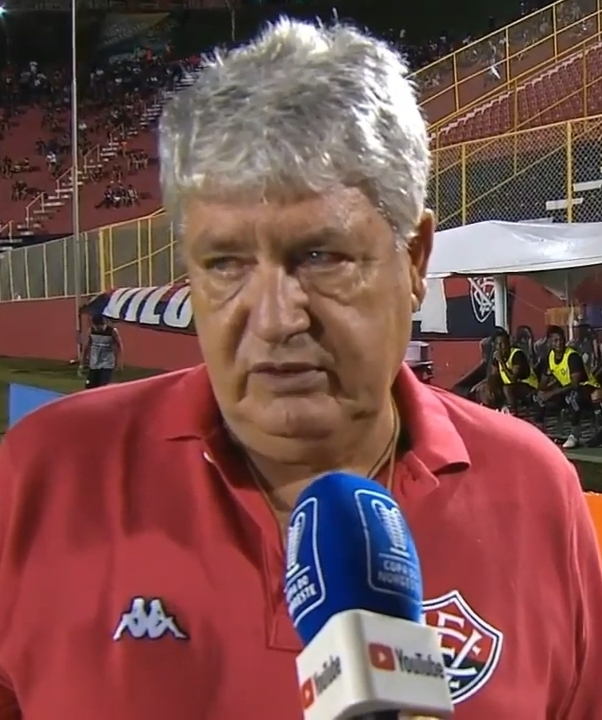

Personal information
- Full name: Eugênio Machado Souto
- Date of birth: 15 May 1948 (age 78)
- Place of birth: Ribeirão Preto, Brazil
- Position: Goalkeeper

Youth career
- 1963–1966: Botafogo-SP

Senior career*
Years	Team	Apps	(Gls)
1966–1973	Botafogo-SP		
1974–1976	Francana		
1976–1980	São Bento		
1980	Paulista		
1981	Caxias		
1982	Vitória		
1983–1984	Novo Hamburgo		

Managerial career
- 1984: Novo Hamburgo
- 1985: Francana
- 1986: Botafogo-SP
- 1986–1987: Santos
- 1988–1989: Vitória de Guimarães
- 1990: Sãocarlense
- 1991: Botafogo-SP
- 1991: Portuguesa
- 1992: Santos
- 1993: Botafogo-SP
- 1993: Al-Shabab
- 1994: Fortaleza
- 1994: União São João
- 1995: Vitória
- 1995: Ponte Preta
- 1996: Juventude
- 1997: Guarani
- 1998: Bahia
- 1998: Vitória
- 1999: Matonense
- 1999: União São João
- 2000: Juventude
- 2000: Ituano
- 2001: Paraná
- 2001–2002: Atlético Paranaense
- 2002: Atlético Mineiro
- 2003: Corinthians
- 2004: Vasco da Gama
- 2004–2005: Al-Ahli
- 2005–2006: Goiás
- 2006: Corinthians
- 2006–2007: Goiás
- 2007: Sport
- 2008: Atlético Mineiro
- 2008: Botafogo
- 2008–2009: Atlético Paranaense
- 2009: Nàutico
- 2010: Atlético Goianiense
- 2010–2011: Sport
- 2011: Atlético Paranaense
- 2011: Vitória
- 2012: Comercial
- 2012: Portuguesa
- 2013: São Caetano
- 2013–2014: Sport
- 2014–2015: Avaí
- 2015: Ceará
- 2016–2017: ABC
- 2018–2019: Avaí
- 2019–2020: Vitória
- 2020: Avaí
- 2022: Vitória
- * Club domestic league appearances and goals

Eugênio Machado Souto (born 15 May 1948), commonly known as Geninho, is a Brazilian football manager and former player who played as a goalkeeper.

== Playing career ==
Born in Ribeirão Preto, São Paulo, Geninho was a product of hometown side Botafogo-SP. He made his first team debut in 1966, aged just 16, and became a regular starter in the following year.

Geninho subsequently represented Francana, São Bento, Paulista, Caxias, Vitória and Novo Hamburgo, retiring with the latter in 1984 at the age of 36.

== Coaching career ==
Immediately after retiring Geninho started working as a manager, being in charge of his last club Novo Hamburgo. In 1985, he took over another club he represented as a player, Francana, and returned to Botafogo-SP in the following year.

In October 1987, Geninho was appointed manager of Santos, replacing departing Candinho. He moved abroad the following July, being named at the helm of Primeira Liga side Vitória de Guimarães.

With the Portuguese side, Geninho won the 1988 Supertaça Cândido de Oliveira, but was sacked in April 1989. Returning to Brazil, he took over Sãocarlense, Portuguesa Santista and Botafogo-SP before returning to Santos in February 1992, replacing fired Rubens Minelli.

For the 1993 season, Geninho returned to Botafogo before accepting an offer from Saudi Arabia's Al-Shabab, but returned shortly after and took over Fortaleza. In 1994, he coached Ituano and União São João, suffering relegation from the Campeonato Paulista and the Série A, respectively, but ended the season at Vitória.

In 1995 Geninho was at the helm of Comercial and Ponte Preta, suffering relegation from the state league with the latter. He later returned to Vitória, and spent the 1996 season in charge of Juventude.

In 1997, after spells at Guarani and Bahia, Geninho returned to União São João, again suffering top tier relegation. He started the 1998 in charge of Matonense, but later returned to Vitória.

Geninho returned to Juventude ahead of the 1999 season, and later worked with Santo André and União São João throughout the year, suffering relegation with the latter. For the following campaign, he returned to Santo André, but only lasted five matches.

On 29 August 2000, Geninho was appointed at the helm of Paraná, leading the club to the title of Copa João Havelange Group Yellow (equivalent to Série B in that season).

On 8 December 2000, Geninho returned to Santos, but left the following May after being knocked out of the year's Paulistão. He later took over Atlético Paranaense, leading the club to their first-ever Brazilian league title.

On 22 May 2002, Geninho was named Atlético Mineiro manager. On 9 January of the following year, he was appointed at the helm of Corinthians. He resigned on 28 September, after a 6–1 loss at Juventude.

On 15 December 2003, Geninho was announced at Vasco da Gama, but was sacked the following 27 September. On 25 December 2004, he was named manager of Al-Ahli, but returned to his home country the following July and took over Goiás.

Geninho returned to Corinthians on 11 May 2006, leaving on 12 August and returning to Goiás two days later. He resigned from the latter club on 7 May 2007, and took over Sport on 19 June.

Geninho was announced as Atlético Mineiro manager on 7 December 2007, but resigned the following 18 May. For the remainder of the campaign, he was in charge of Botafogo and Atlético Paranaense.

Geninho resigned from Furacão in June 2009, and took over Nàutico in the following month. On 20 February 2010, he was appointed in charge of Atlético Goianiense,

Geninho quit Dragão on 7 June 2010, and returned to Sport on 10 August. He left the latter club the following February, and returned to Atlético Paranaense late in the month.

Geninho was dismissed by Furacão on 4 April 2011, and returned to Vitória on 19 May. Relieved from his duties on 24 July, he returned to Comercial the following 28 February.

On 23 April 2012, Geninho was named at the helm of Portuguesa, being sacked on 8 December. In the following five seasons, he was in charge of five different clubs: São Caetano, Sport, Avaí, Ceará and ABC.

On 19 April 2018, Geninho replaced Claudinei Oliveira at Avaí, and finished the season by achieving promotion to the first division. He was sacked on 17 June 2019, and had a nine-month spell in charge of Vitória before returning to the club on 2 August 2020. He resigned on 9 December.

On 17 March 2022, after more than one year without coaching, Geninho returned to Vitória for a fifth spell.

== Managerial statistics ==
As of 12 June 2025

Managerial record by team and tenure
Team	Nat	From	To	Record								Ref
Team	Nat	From	To	G	W	D	L	GF	GA	GD	Win %	Ref
Novo Hamburgo	(Brazil)	1 January 1984	30 November 1984	60	21	21	18	56	49	+7	35.00	
Francana	(Brazil)	1 January 1985	30 November 1985	30	12	12	6	26	15	+11	40.00	
Botafogo-SP	(Brazil)	1 January 1986	30 November 1986	38	12	11	15	37	51	−14	31.58	
Santos	(Brazil)	23 March 1987	7 March 1988	57	18	26	13	56	50	+6	31.58	
Santos	(Brazil)	27 February 1992	29 November 1992	53	17	21	15	71	59	+12	32.08	
Vitória	(Brazil)	19 May 2011	24 July 2011	12	5	2	5	14	15	−1	41.67	
ABC	(Brazil)	22 February 2016	19 July 2017	84	37	24	23	122	93	+29	44.05	
Avaí	(Brazil)	19 April 2018	17 June 2019	71	30	22	19	98	58	+40	42.25	
Vitória	(Brazil)	23 September 2019	20 June 2020	32	12	13	7	45	34	+11	37.50	
Vitória	(Brazil)	21 March 2022	21 April 2022	4	1	0	3	3	6	−3	25.00	
Total				441	165	152	124	548	430	+118	37.41	—

== Honours ==
=== Manager ===
Vitória Guimarães

- Supertaça Cândido de Oliveira: 1988

Al-Shabab

- Saudi Premier League: 1992–93

Paraná Clube

- Copa João Havelange Group Yellow: 2000

Atlético Paranaense

- Campeonato Brasileiro Série A: 2001

Corinthians

- Campeonato Paulista: 2003

Goiás

- Campeonato Goiano: 2006

Atlético Goianiense

- Campeonato Goiano: 2010

ABC

- Campeonato Potiguar: 2016, 2017

Avaí

- Campeonato Catarinense: 2019

== See also ==
- List of football managers with the most matches
