= Basaula Lemba =

Congolese retired footballer (born 1965)

Basaula
Personal information
- Full name: Basaula Lemba
- Date of birth: 3 March 1965 (age 61)
- Place of birth: Léopoldville, DR Congo
- Height: 1.77 m (5 ft 9 1/2 in)
- Position: Midfielder

Senior career*
Years	Team	Apps	(Gls)
1985–1986	Vita Club		
1986–1987	Vitória Guimarães	7	(0)
1987–1988	O Elvas	29	(4)
1988–1990	Estrela Amadora	61	(4)
1990–1994	Vitória Guimarães	94	(7)
1995	Belenenses	17	(0)
1995–1996	Tirsense	5	(0)
1996–1997	Moreirense	17	(0)
1997–1999	Vasco Gama		
1999–2000	União Montemor		

International career
1988–1994	Zaire	10	(1)
- * Club domestic league appearances and goals

Basaula Lemba (born 3 March 1965) is a Congolese retired footballer who played as a midfielder.

Almost his entire professional career was spent in Portugal, mainly with Vitória de Guimarães.

== Club career ==
Born in Kinshasa, Zaire, Lemba arrived in Portugal at the age of 21, signing with Vitória S.C. from AS Vita Club but having absolutely no impact in his first season – seven matches. He spent the following three campaigns also in the Primeira Liga, representing O Elvas C.A.D. and C.F. Estrela da Amadora.

Basaula – called by his first name whilst in Portugal – re-joined Vitória in 1990, becoming an important midfield element at the Minho club and sharing teams with countryman N'Dinga Mbote during his spell. In January 1995 he left for another side in the country, C.F. Os Belenenses, switching to F.C. Tirsense shortly after. After one year in the second division with Moreirense F.C. he moved to the lower leagues, representing two teams in the fourth level until his retirement at the age of 35.

== International career ==
Lemba played for Zaire at the 1992 and 1994 editions of the Africa Cup of Nations, with both tournaments ending in quarter-final exits.
