= Chico Oliveira =

Portuguese footballer (1964–2006)

Personal information
- Full name: Francisco Conceição Alves Correia Oliveira
- Date of birth: 27 January 1964
- Place of birth: Maputo, Portuguese Mozambique
- Date of death: 1 October 2006 (aged 42)
- Height: 1.84 m (6 ft 0 in)
- Position: Defender

Youth career
- 1978–1980: Estoril AC
- 1980–1982: Estoril

Senior career*
Years	Team	Apps	(Gls)
1982–1986	Estoril		
1986–1989	Famalicão		
1989–1990	Estrela Amadora	13	(0)
1990–1991	Marítimo	30	(0)
1991–1994	Paços de Ferreira	82	(2)
1994–1995	Salgueiros	24	(1)
1995–1996	Chaves	27	(0)
1996–1997	Felgueiras	18	(1)
1997–1998	Feirense	24	(0)
1998	Castêlo da Maia		
1999–2000	Ermesinde	35	(5)
2000–2001	Lamego		
2001–2002	Joane	25	(1)
- * Club domestic league appearances and goals

Francisco Conceição Alves Correia Oliveira, known as Chico Oliveira (27 January 1964 – 1 October 2006) was a Portuguese footballer who played as a defender.

== Career ==
Oliveira played seven seasons and 176 games in the Primeira Liga for Paços de Ferreira, Marítimo, Chaves, Salgueiros, and Estrela Amadora.

== Honours ==
Estrela Amadora

- Taça de Portugal: 1989–90
