= Pedro Eugénio =

Portuguese footballer

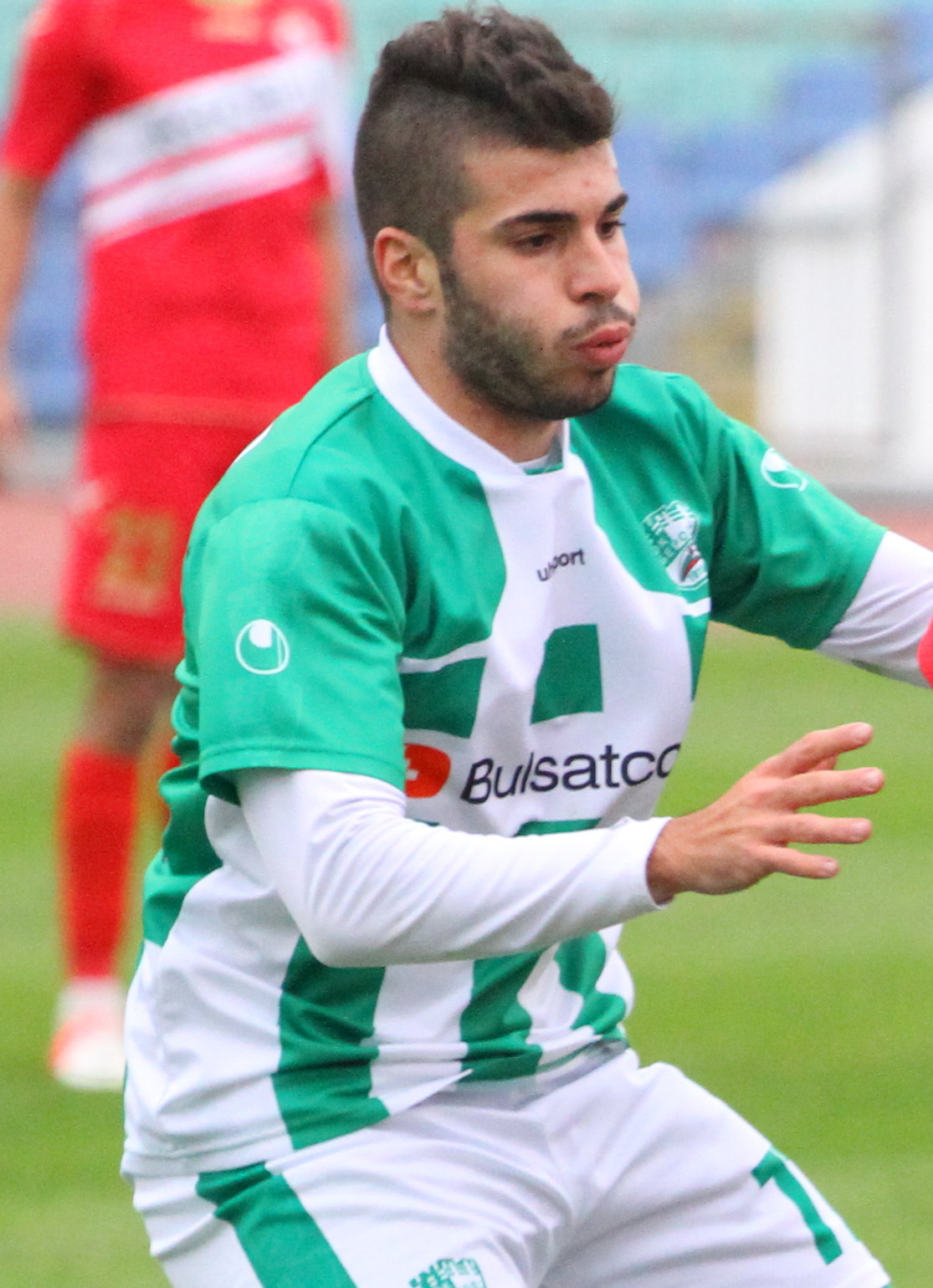
- Eugénio playing for Beroe in 2012

Personal information
- Full name: Pedro Miguel Pina Eugénio
- Date of birth: 26 June 1990 (age 36)
- Place of birth: Faro, Portugal
- Height: 1.72 m (5 ft 8 in)
- Positions: Winger; right-back

Youth career
- 1999–2000: Olhanense
- 2001–2004: Farense
- 2004–2005: Sporting CP
- 2005–2006: Farense
- 2006–2009: Benfica

Senior career*
Years	Team	Apps	(Gls)
2009–2010	Messinense		
2010–2011	Louletano	30	(4)
2011–2012	Farense	29	(1)
2012–2013	Beroe	21	(3)
2014	Farense	12	(0)
2014–2015	Haskovo	14	(1)
2015–2016	Cherno More	17	(1)
2016–2017	Vereya	31	(3)
2017–2018	Beroe	31	(16)
2018	Altay	13	(1)
2019–2020	Beroe	29	(7)
2020	Zhetysu	18	(5)
2021	Taraz	18	(7)
2021–2023	Astana	29	(18)
2023	Al Adalah	14	(4)
2024	Atyrau	8	(2)
2024	Tobol	6	(0)

International career
2006–2007	Portugal U17	5	(0)
- * Club domestic league appearances and goals as of 16 November 2024

Pedro Miguel Pina Eugénio (born 26 June 1990) is a Portuguese professional footballer who plays as a right winger or a right-back.

He spent most of his career abroad, making 143 appearances and scoring 31 goals in the Bulgarian top flight for four clubs, including three spells at Beroe. He also played in Turkey, Kazakhstan and Saudi Arabia, and had a brief stint in his country's second tier with Farense.

== Club career ==
Eugénio was born in Faro, Algarve. As a youth player he represented four clubs, starting his development with S.C. Olhanense and finishing it with S.L. Benfica. He made his senior debut in 2009 with União Desportiva Messinense in the regional championships, then switched to Algarve neighbours Louletano D.C. in the third division for the following season.

In the 2011–12 campaign, Eugénio represented S.C. Farense in the fourth tier. On 30 July 2012, after a short trial period, he joined Bulgarian side PFC Beroe Stara Zagora on a three-year deal. He appeared in his first match as a professional on 11 August, playing the full 90 minutes in a 4–0 home win against POFC Botev Vratsa.

Eugénio returned to his homeland and Farense in January 2014, with the team now in the Segunda Liga. In the summer, he returned to Bulgaria with FC Haskovo.

On 9 November 2014, Eugénio scored after dribbling two opponents in a 90-meter run, but in a 2–4 home loss to PFC CSKA Sofia. He signed for FC Vereya in July 2016, arriving from fellow First Professional Football League team PFC Cherno More Varna.

Eugénio returned to Beroe on 16 June 2017. This was the most prolific season of his career, coming third in goalscorers with 16 in 31 games; this included a hat-trick on 17 February in a 4–1 victory at Cherno More. At its conclusion, he moved to the Turkish TFF 1. Lig after agreeing to a two-year contract at Altay S.K. for an undisclosed fee. He left by mutual consent and returned to Beroe in January 2019; that July, Altay were put under a transfer embargo by FIFA until they settled debts of around 1 million Turkish lira with Eugénio and Ivan Ivanov.

Eugénio competed in the Kazakhstan Premier League the following years, representing FC Zhetysu, FC Taraz and FC Astana and being voted player of the 2020 season at the first of those clubs. On 25 January 2023, hours after leaving the latter, the free agent joined Al Adalah Club in the Saudi Pro League.

== Personal life ==
Eugénio's father, Rui, was also a footballer and a defender.

== Career statistics ==
As of 21 April 2019

Club	Season	League	Domestic		Cup (Note: Appearances in Cup and League Cup)		Europe		Other		Total	
Club	Season	League	Apps	Goals	Apps	Goals	Apps	Goals	Apps	Goals	Apps	Goals
Louletano	2010–11	Segunda Divisão	30	4	3	2	–	–	–	–	33	6
Farense	2011–12	Terceira Divisão	29	1	0	0	–	–	–	–	29	1
Beroe	2012–13	First Professional League	21	3	1	0	–	–	–	–	22	3
Farense	2013–14	Segunda Liga	12	0	0	0	–	–	–	–	12	0
Haskovo	2014–15	First Professional League	14	1	3	0	–	–	–	–	17	1
Cherno More	2015–16	First Professional League	17	1	2	0	0	0	–	–	19	1
Vereya	2016–17	First Professional League	31	3	5	2	–	–	–	–	36	5
Beroe	2017–18	First Professional League	31	16	1	0	–	–	–	–	32	16
Altay	2018–19	TFF 1. Lig	13	1	3	2	–	–	–	–	16	3
Beroe	2018–19	First Professional League	10	2	0	0	–	–	–	–	10	2
Career totals			208	32	18	6	0	0	0	0	226	38

== Honours ==
Farense

- Terceira Divisão: 2011–12

Beroe

- Bulgarian Cup: 2012–13
- Bulgarian Supercup: 2013

Astana

- Kazakhstan Premier League: 2022

Individual

- Kazakhstan Premier League top scorer: 2022
