= Kalombo N'Kongolo =

Congolese footballer (1961–1993)

Personal information
- Full name: Kalombo N'Kongolo
- Date of birth: 17 July 1961
- Place of birth: Kinshasa, Zaire
- Date of death: 10 March 1993 (aged 31)
- Place of death: Lisbon, Portugal
- Height: 1.85 m (6 ft 1 in)
- Position: Centre-back

Senior career*
Years	Team	Apps	(Gls)
1986–1987	FC Liège	24	(1)
1987–1988	Espinho	31	(2)
1988–1989	Porto	17	(0)
1989–1992	Espinho	65	(6)
1992–1993	Atlético	8	(0)
Total		145	(9)

International career
1985–1991	Zaire	12	(0)
- * Club domestic league appearances and goals

Kalombo N'Kongolo (17 July 1961 – 10 March 1993) was a Congolese professional footballer who played as a central defender.

== Club career ==
N'Kongolo was born in Kinshasa, and spent most of his professional career in Portugal, where he arrived at the age of 26 signing for modest S.C. Espinho of Primeira Liga. His solid performances attracted the attention of FC Porto.

In his sole season at Porto, N'Kongolo appeared in 17 matches – 16 starts – as his team finished second to S.L. Benfica. He returned to Espinho for three further campaigns, with the club now in the Segunda Liga. On 10 March 1993, after spending a few months with Atlético Clube de Portugal in the third division, he died from a brain embolism; he was 31 years old.

== International career ==
N'Kongolo was part of the Zaire squad at the 1988 African Cup of Nations held in Morocco, playing two games in an eventual group-stage exit.
