= Ferreira da Costa =

Portuguese football coach and player

Personal information
- Full name: Joaquim da Rocha Ferreira da Costa
- Date of birth: 1 November 1953 (age 73)
- Place of birth: Gondomar, Portugal
- Position: Midfielder

Youth career
- 1969–1972: Porto

Senior career*
Years	Team	Apps	(Gls)
1972–1973	Porto	4	(0)
1973–1975	Sporting Espinho	28	(1)
1975–1981	Vitória de Guimarães	156	(23)
1981–1985	Penafiel	78	(8)
1985–1988	Chaves	29	(2)

Managerial career
- 1984: Penafiel
- 1988–1989: Marítimo
- 1989–1990: Marítimo
- * Club domestic league appearances and goals

Joaquim da Rocha Ferreira da Costa, known as Ferreira da Costa (born 1 November 1953) is a Portuguese former football player and coach.

He played 14 seasons and 295 games in the Primeira Liga for Vitória de Guimarães, Penafiel, Chaves, Sporting Espinho and Porto.

== Club career ==
He made his Primeira Liga debut for Porto on 15 April 1973 in a game against Atlético CP.
