= Nélson Borges (footballer, born 1955) =

Brazilian footballer

Nelson Borges
Personal information
- Full name: Nelson Borges de Freitas
- Date of birth: 22 January 1955 (age 71)
- Place of birth: Juliânia, Herculândia, Brazil
- Position: Midfielder

Senior career*
Years	Team	Apps	(Gls)
1972	Tupã FC	5	(2)
1973	AE Osvaldo Cruz	7	(2)
1974–1975	Tupã FC	25	(8)
1975–1976	EC Noroeste	12	(2)
1976–1977	Tupã FC	24	(9)
1977	EC Noroeste	20	(10)
1978	Santos	30	(3)
1979–1981	America-RJ	30	(10)
1982	Náutico	40	(30)
1983	Inter de Limeira	15	(10)
1983–1986	Farense	105	(43)
1986–1990	Estrela Amadora	132	(51)
- * Club domestic league appearances and goals

Nélson Borges de Freitas, known as Nélson Borges (born 22 January 1955) is a Brazilian former professional footballer who played as a midfielder. He played four seasons and 102 games in the Primeira Liga for Estrela Amadora and Farense.

== Honours ==
Estrela Amadora

- Taça de Portugal: 1989–90

Seleção Paulista

- Copa Presidente da Coréia do Sul: 1977

Santos

- Paulistão: 1978,
