= Rui Eugénio =

Portuguese footballer (born 1966)

Personal information
- Full name: Rui Pedro Rodrigues Eugénio
- Date of birth: 21 July 1966 (age 60)
- Place of birth: Almada, Portugal
- Height: 1.66 m (5 ft 5 in)
- Position: Full-back

Youth career
- 1979–1984: Sporting CP

Senior career*
Years	Team	Apps	(Gls)
1984–1985	Olhanense	23	(0)
1985–1986	Águeda	28	(1)
1986–1988	Estoril	53	(4)
1988–1992	Farense	132	(3)
1992–1995	Braga	75	(2)
1995–2000	Farense	100	(1)
2000–2001	Olhanense	13	(0)
2001–2002	Valdevez		
2002–2003	Sambrasense		
Total		424	(11)

Managerial career
- 2003–2005: Farense (assistant)
- 2003: Farense (interim)
- 2006–2007: Farense (assistant)
- * Club domestic league appearances and goals

Rui Pedro Rodrigues Eugénio (born 21 July 1966) is a Portuguese former professional footballer who played as a right or left-back.

== Club career ==
Born in Almada, Setúbal District, Eugénio played at the professional level with S.C. Olhanense, R.D. Águeda, G.D. Estoril Praia, S.C. Farense (two spells) and S.C. Braga. He amassed Primeira Liga totals of 272 games and five goals over the course of 11 seasons, in representation of the fourth and fifth clubs.

After retiring, Eugénio stayed connected with Farense as an assistant manager.

== Personal life ==
Eugénio's son, Pedro, was also a footballer and a defender.
