= 2017 Taça de Macau =

Tournament details
- Country: Macau
- Teams: 16

Final positions
- Champions: Benfica de Macau
- Runners-up: Monte Carlo

The 2017 Taça de Macau is the 2017 cup season competition of Taça de Macau.

== Round of 16 ==
| Team 1 | Score | Team 2 |
|---|---|---|
| 勵馳 LAI CHI | 0–1 | 海關 ALFANDEGA |
| 士砵亭 SPORTING | 4–1 | 德晉加義 TAK CHUN KA I |
| 青鋒 CHENG FUNG | 5–0 | 康樂 HONG LOK |
| 警察 POLICIA | 0–3 | 賓菲加 BENFICA |
| 發展隊 DEVELOPMENT | 0–3 | 鄒北記 C.P.K. |
| 基聯 KEI LUN | 5–0 | 鴻毅 HONG NGAI |
| 蒙地卡羅 MONTE CARLO | 11–0 | 通吃 PAPATUDO |
| 東國旗艦 T.K.K.L. | 1–2 | C.D.F.BENFICA |

== Quarter-finals ==
| Team 1 | Score | Team 2 |
|---|---|---|
| 青鋒 CHENG FUNG | 2–6 | 賓菲加 BENFICA |
| 蒙地卡羅 MONTE CARLO | 4–0 | 海關 ALFANDEGA |
| C.D.F.BENFICA | 0–5 | 鄒北記 C.P.K. |
| 基聯 KEI LUN | 6–1 | 士砵亭 SPORTING |

== Semi-finals ==
| Team 1 | Score | Team 2 |
|---|---|---|
| 蒙地卡羅 MONTE CARLO | 2–0 | 鄒北記 C.P.K. |
| 基聯 KEI LUN | 1–3 | 賓菲加 BENFICA |

== Third place match ==
| Team 1 | Score | Team 2 |
|---|---|---|
| 鄒北記 C.P.K. | 3–4 | 基聯 KEI LUN |

== Final ==
| Team 1 | Score | Team 2 |
|---|---|---|
| 蒙地卡羅 MONTE CARLO | 1–8 | 賓菲加 BENFICA |

== See also ==
- 2017 Liga de Elite
