= Joaquim Rebelo =

Portuguese footballer

Rebelo
Personal information
- Full name: Joaquim Gonçalves Rebelo
- Date of birth: 12 February 1961 (age 65)
- Place of birth: Loures, Portugal
- Height: 1.80 m (5 ft 11 in)
- Positions: Defender; midfielder

Senior career*
| Years | Team | Apps | (Gls) |
| 1979–1981 | Trafaria | | |
| 1981–1983 | Pescadores | | |
| 1983–1985 | Almada | | |
| 1985–1987 | Sacavenense | | |
| 1987–2001 | Estrela da Amadora | 408 | (6) |
- * Club domestic league appearances and goals

Joaquim Gonçalves Rebelo (born 12 February 1961), known as Rebelo, is a Portuguese former footballer who played as a defender and midfielder. He played 11 seasons and 308 games in the Primeira Liga for Estrela da Amadora.

== Career ==
Rebelo made his Primeira Liga debut for Estrela da Amadora on 28 August 1988 in a game against Braga.

== Honours ==
Estrela da Amadora

- Taça de Portugal: 1989–90
