= Raul Águas =

Portuguese football manager and former player

Personal information
- Full name: Raul António Águas
- Date of birth: 12 January 1949 (age 77)
- Place of birth: Lobito, Angola
- Position: Striker

Youth career
- Benfica

Senior career*
Years	Team	Apps	(Gls)
1968–1971	Benfica	17	(4)
1971–1972	Académica	17	(3)
1972–1975	União Tomar	51	(20)
1975–1977	Mechelen	66	(29)
1977–1979	Lierse	65	(21)
1979–1982	Oliveira Bairro	80	(58)
1982–1983	Portimonense	26	(10)
1983–1984	Chaves		
Total		322	(145)

International career
1967	Portugal U18	2	(0)

Managerial career
- 1984–1988: Chaves
- 1988–1989: Boavista
- 1989–1990: Sporting CP
- 1990: Braga
- 1990–1991: Boavista
- 1991–1994: Vitória Setúbal
- 1994–1995: Paços Ferreira
- 1995–1996: Marítimo
- 1996–1998: Portugal (assistant)
- 1998–1999: Académica
- 1999: Naval
- 2003–2004: CSKA Moscow (assistant)
- * Club domestic league appearances and goals

Raul António Águas (born 12 January 1949) is a Portuguese retired football striker and manager.

== Playing career ==
Born in Lobito, Portuguese Angola, Águas started his career having an unsuccessful spell at S.L. Benfica, moving after three years to Académica de Coimbra. He finished his career in 1984 at the age of 35, after stints for U.F.C.I. Tomar, Belgium's K.V. Mechelen and Lierse SK, Oliveira do Bairro SC, Portimonense S.C. and G.D. Chaves.

Over eight seasons, Águas amassed Primeira Liga totals of 111 matches and 37 goals.

== Coaching career ==
Águas would have a more prominent career as manager, starting with his last club and helping the lowly northerners qualify for the UEFA Cup in 1987 after they finished an all-time best fifth in the league. After his exploits he moved to fellow league side Boavista F.C. early into the 1988–89 campaign.

After a third place with Sporting CP in 1990, being one of three managers during the season, Águas successively managed S.C. Braga, Vitória de Setúbal – four years, two in the second division – F.C. Paços de Ferreira and C.S. Marítimo. In 1995, he joined António Oliveira's staff as the Portugal national team prepared for UEFA Euro 1996, retaining his assistant post under the next coach, former Benfica player and manager Artur Jorge; after the team's failure to qualify for the 1998 FIFA World Cup, the pair was sacked.

Águas then returned to club action with former side Académica, for one year, then spent four years out of professional football, after which he was again assistant to Artur Jorge, now with PFC CSKA Moscow in Russia.

== Personal life ==
Águas' uncle, José Águas, as well as his cousin Rui, played with great success for Benfica and Portugal. The latter also represented FC Porto, winning accolades there as well.
