= António Carvalho (footballer) =

Portuguese football manager and player (1960–2023)

Personal information
- Full name: António José Pereira de Carvalho
- Date of birth: 10 December 1960
- Place of birth: Guimarães, Portugal
- Date of death: 18 November 2023 (aged 62)
- Place of death: Creixomil, Portugal
- Height: 1.78 m (5 ft 10 in)
- Positions: Midfielder; left-back

Youth career
- 1974–1979: Vitória Guimarães

Senior career*
Years	Team	Apps	(Gls)
1979–1981	Vitória Guimarães	10	(0)
1981–1982	Sanjoanense	24	(0)
1982–1984	Salgueiros	56	(4)
1984–1986	Portimonense	54	(1)
1986–1991	Vitória Guimarães	137	(7)
1991–1992	Paços Ferreira	22	(0)
1992–1993	Moreirense	19	(4)
1993–1994	Ronfe	10	(0)
Total		332	(16)

International career
1977–1978	Portugal U16	5	(1)
1987–1988	Portugal U23	5	(0)
1987	Portugal	2	(0)

Managerial career
- 2001–2004: Vitória Guimarães (under-19)
- 2004–2006: Dragões Sandinenses
- 2006–2007: Caçadores Taipas
- 2007: Brito
- 2008–2009: Caçadores Taipas
- 2009–2012: Lousada
- 2012: Ribeirão
- 2013–2014: Oliveirense
- 2014–2015: Tirsense
- 2016: Sobrado
- 2017: Leixões (assistant)
- 2018: Caçadores Taipas
- 2019: Lousada
- 2019–2020: Ribeirão
- * Club domestic league appearances and goals

António José Pereira de Carvalho (10 December 1960 – 18 November 2023) was a Portuguese football player and manager who played as a midfielder or left-back.
