= Basílio Marques =

Portuguese football manager and former player

Personal information
- Full name: Basílio Fernandes Marques
- Date of birth: 9 May 1966 (age 60)
- Place of birth: Guimarães, Portugal
- Height: 1.74 m (5 ft 9 in)
- Position: Left back

Team information
- Current team: Nacional (assistant coach)

Youth career
- 1979–1985: Vitória Guimarães

Senior career*
Years	Team	Apps	(Gls)
1985–1986	Lixa	–	(–)
1986–1997	Vitória Guimarães	173	(1)
1997–1999	Campomaiorense	43	(0)
1999–2000	Famalicão	22	(1)

International career
	Portugal U21	7	(0)

Managerial career
- 2004–2011: Vitória Guimarães (assistant)
- 2011: Vitória Guimarães (interim)
- 2012: Aris (assistant)
- 2012–: Nacional (assistant)
- * Club domestic league appearances and goals

Basílio Fernandes Marques (born 10 October 1966), is a Portuguese retired footballer who played as a left defender, and the current assistant manager of C.D. Nacional.

Marques has managed Vitória Guimarães on an interim basis on three occasions.
