= Elias (footballer, born 1963) =

Portuguese footballer

Personal information
- Full name: Fernando Elias Oliveira da Silva
- Date of birth: 20 November 1963 (age 62)
- Place of birth: Paredes, Portugal
- Height: 1.78 m (5 ft 10 in)
- Position: Midfielder

Youth career
- 1979–1982: Penafiel

Senior career*
Years	Team	Apps	(Gls)
1982–1989	Penafiel		
1989–1991	Estrela Amadora	34	(0)
1991–1994	Tirsense	63	(3)
1994–1998	Penafiel	113	(1)
- * Club domestic league appearances and goals

Fernando Elias Oliveira da Silva, known as Elias (born 20 November 1963) is a Portuguese former professional footballer who played s a midfielder. He played eight seasons and 200 games in the Primeira Liga for Penafiel, Estrela Amadora and Tirsense.

== Honours ==
Estrela Amadora

- Taça de Portugal: 1989–90
