= Conhé =

Portuguese football manager and former player

Personal information
- Full name: José António Mendonça Ferreira
- Date of birth: 4 July 1945 (age 81)
- Place of birth: Alhos Vedros, Portugal
- Position: Goalkeeper

Senior career*
Years	Team	Apps	(Gls)
1961–1962	União de Tomar		
1963–1967	Luso		
1967–1970	União de Tomar		
1970–1976	Fabril Barreiro	158	(0)
1976–1977	Sporting	20	(0)
1977–1980	Braga	80	(0)
1980–1982	Portimonense	34	(0)

Managerial career
- 1983–1984: Beira-Mar
- 1987–1990: Vitória de Setúbal (assistant)
- 1990: Vitória de Setúbal
- 1990–1992: Montijo
- 1992–1993: Esperança de Lagos
- 1996–1999: Montijo
- 1999–2000: União Montemor
- 2000–2001: Palmelense
- 2002–2003: Badajoz (GK coach)
- 2002: Badajoz
- 2003–2004: Vitória de Setúbal (assistant)
- 2006–2008: Vitória de Setúbal (assistant)
- 2008–2009: Palmelense
- 2010–2011: Vitória de Setúbal (GK coach)
- 2011–2012: Vitória de Setúbal (assistant)
- 2012–2013: Fabril Barreiro
- * Club domestic league appearances and goals

José António Mendonça Ferreira, known as Conhé (born 4 July 1945) is a Portuguese football manager and a former player.

He played 14 seasons and 329 games in the Primeira Liga for Fabril Barreiro, Braga, União de Tomar, Portimonense and Sporting.

Conhé made his Primeira Liga debut for União de Tomar on 8 September 1968 in a game against Atlético CP.
