= Rui Neves (footballer, born 1969) =

Portuguese footballer

Personal information
- Full name: Rui Miguel Leal das Neves
- Date of birth: 21 December 1969 (age 56)
- Place of birth: Lisbon, Portugal
- Height: 1.74 m (5 ft 9 in)
- Position: Defender

Youth career
- 1985–1988: Estrela da Amadora

Senior career*
Years	Team	Apps	(Gls)
1988–1993	Estrela da Amadora	94	(1)
1993–1994	Gil Vicente	32	(2)
1994–2004	Estrela da Amadora	285	(9)
- * Club domestic league appearances and goals

Rui Miguel Leal das Neves (born 21 December 1969) is a Portuguese former footballer who played as a defender.

== Career ==
Neves made his professional debut in the Primeira Liga for Estrela da Amadora on 9 October 1988 as a starter in a 0–2 loss to Boavista. He spent the most of his career with the club, playing 318 games on the top flight of Portuguese football.

== Personal life ==
His twin brother Jorge Neves also played football professionally, winning the Portuguese Cup with Beira-Mar and is now a coach.
