= C.D. Feirense =

Feirense
- Full name: Clube Desportivo Feirense
- Nicknames: Azuis da Feira (Blues from the Feira); Fogaceiros; Billas
- Founded: 18 March 1918; 108 years ago
- Ground: Estádio Marcolino de Castro
- Capacity: 5,401
- Chairman: Rodrigo Nunes
- Manager: Rui Ferreira
- League: Liga Portugal 2
- 2025–26: Liga Portugal 2, 8th of 18
- Website: www.cdfeirense.pt
Home colours	Away colours

Clube Desportivo Feirense, commonly known as CD Feirense or just Feirense, is a Portuguese football club based in Santa Maria da Feira. Founded on 18 March 1918, Feirense play in the LigaPro, the second tier of Portuguese football. Their chairman is Rodrigo Nunes and their manager is Ricardo Costa. The club plays its home matches at the Estádio Marcolino de Castro, with a capacity of 5,401 spectators.

== History ==
Founded in 1918, Feirense played only three Primeira Liga seasons in the 20th century – 1962–63, 1977–78 and 1989–90 – being relegated in each one. In 2009–10, the club came close to ending a two-decade exile but missed out on the last day, as local rivals S.C. Beira-Mar went up with Portimonense SC.

The following year, Feirense went one better by coming second, missing out on the title on goal difference to Gil Vicente F.C. and winning promotion under Quim Machado in May 2011. However, a year later they were relegated. A four-season spell in the second tier ended with promotion in third place in May 2016, under manager José Mota.

Mota left in December 2016 and was succeeded by his assistant Nuno Manta Santos, who took the team to a best-ever eighth place. After just staying up in 2018, Feirense went down in April 2019 with four games to play.

== Stadium ==
The Estádio Marcolino de Castro is a multi-use stadium in the town of Santa Maria da Feira. It is currently used mostly for football matches and is the home stadium of Feirense, who play in the Portuguese Liga Portugal 2 Meu Super. The stadium is capable of holding other sporting events. Its capacity for a football match is 5,401 spectators. Estádio Marcolino de Castro was built in 1962 when Feirense was promoted for the first time to the top-flight Portuguese Liga.

== Players ==
=== Current squad ===
As of 16 September 2026

Note: Flags indicate national team as defined under FIFA eligibility rules; some limited exceptions apply. Players may hold more than one non-FIFA nationality.

No.	Pos.	Nation	Player
1	GK	POR	Francisco Meixedo
2	DF	BRA	Luiz Gustavo
3	DF	BRA	Kaiquy
4	DF	ESP	Antonio Leal
5	DF	NGR	Osasumwen Bolaji
7	FW	BRA	Arthur Viana
8	MF	POR	Gui Santos
9	FW	POR	Jair Monteiro
10	FW	ESP	Jonny Arriba
11	FW	GHA	Desmond Nketia
14	DF	POR	Pedro Pinto
15	DF	ESP	Diego Moreno
16	DF	POR	André Lopes
19	FW	POR	Alexandre Guedes
20	DF	POR	Jójó
21	MF	NGR	Hassan Wahab

No.	Pos.	Nation	Player
22	MF	NGR	Samad Popoola
23	FW	BRA	Pedrinho
24	MF	FRA	Momo Diaby
25	FW	POR	Henrique Pereira (on loan from Santa Clara)
26	GK	ESP	Diego Altube
27	MF	POR	Tiago Castro
30	FW	NGR	Peter Adejimi
32	DF	GBS	Edgar Ié
41	DF	BRA	Miguel Rocha
47	FW	ESP	Piri
53	DF	BRA	Dorival
54	MF	POR	Tiago Antunes
67	MF	BRA	Isaac Valença (on loan from Santa Clara)
77	MF	BRA	Gui Meira (on loan from Cruzeiro)
80	FW	BRA	Adriel Moraes (on loan from Santa Clara)
90	MF	POR	Luisinho (on loan from Braga)

=== Out on loan ===
Note: Flags indicate national team as defined under FIFA eligibility rules; some limited exceptions apply. Players may hold more than one non-FIFA nationality.

No.	Pos.	Nation	Player
—	FW	POR	Danny (at Sporting da Covilhã until 30 June 2027)

== Managerial history ==
- (Portugal) Alfredo Valadas (1959–60)
- (Portugal) Henrique Nunes (1987–90)
- (Portugal) Álvaro Carolino (1991)
- (Portugal) Henrique Nunes (1991–93)
- (Portugal) Amândio Barreiras (1993–95)
- (Portugal) Henrique Nunes (1995–97)
- (Portugal) António Jesus (1997)
- (Portugal) José Dinis (1997–98)
- (Portugal) Henrique Nunes (1998–99)
- (Brazil) Chiquinho Carioca (2000)
- (Portugal) Gabriel Mendes (2000)
- (Portugal) Edmundo Duarte (2000–01)
- (Portugal) António Caetano (2000–01)
- (Portugal) Henrique Nunes (2001–03)
- (Portugal) Francisco Chaló (2003–06)
- (Portugal) Henrique Nunes (2006–07)
- (Portugal) Luís Miguel (2007–08)
- (Portugal) Álvaro Magalhães (2008)
- (Portugal) Henrique Nunes (2008)
- (Portugal) Francisco Chaló (2008–09)
- (Portugal) Carlos Garcia (2009–10)
- (Portugal) Quim Machado (2010–12)
- (Portugal) Henrique Nunes (2012)
- (Portugal) Bruno Moura (2012)
- (Portugal) Quim Machado (2012–13)
- (Portugal) Pedro Miguel (2013–15)
- (Portugal) Pepa (2015–16)
- (Portugal) José Mota (2016)
- (Portugal) Nuno Manta Santos (2016–19)
- (Portugal) Filipe Martins (2019)
- (Portugal) Filó (2019–21)

== Honours ==
- Segunda Liga
  - Runners-up (1): 2010–11
- Portuguese Second Division
  - Winners (1): 2002–03
  - Runners-up (3): 1961–62, 1976–77, 1993–94
- AF Aveiro First Division
  - Winners (3): 1959–60, 1965–66, 1967–68
