= Quinito =

Portuguese footballer and coach (born 1948)

Personal information
- Full name: Joaquim Lucas Duro de Jesus
- Date of birth: 6 November 1948 (age 77)
- Place of birth: Setúbal, Portugal
- Height: 1.76 m (5 ft 9 in)
- Position: Midfielder

Youth career
- 1966–1967: Vitória Setúbal

Senior career*
| Years | Team | Apps | (Gls) |
| 1967–1969 | Académica | 8 | (0) |
| 1969–1975 | Belenenses | 145 | (11) |
| 1975–1978 | Racing Santander | 72 | (6) |
| 1978–1980 | Braga | 40 | (0) |
| Total | | 265 | (17) |

International career
| 1970–1971 | Portugal U21 | 4 | (1) |

Managerial career
- 1981–1982: Braga
- 1982–1983: Rio Ave
- 1983–1985: Braga
- 1985–1986: Al-Yarmouk
- 1986–1988: Espinho
- 1988: Porto
- 1989: Marítimo
- 1989–1990: Portimonense
- 1990: União Leiria
- 1990–1991: Vitória Setúbal
- 1991–1993: Espinho
- 1994: Rio Ave
- 1994–1995: Vitória Guimarães
- 1995–1996: Vitória Setúbal
- 1996: Belenenses
- 1997: União Leiria
- 1997–1998: Vitória Guimarães
- 1999–2000: Vitória Guimarães
- 2000–2001: Estrela Amadora
- * Club domestic league appearances and goals

Joaquim Lucas Duro de Jesus (born 6 November 1948), known as Quinito, is a Portuguese former football midfielder and manager.

== Playing career ==
Born in Setúbal, Quinito played in exactly ten Primeira Liga seasons during his professional career, making his debut in 1967–68 with Académica de Coimbra – having moved to Coimbra to study medicine at the university– but he only appeared in eight league matches over two full seasons. He also represented C.F. Os Belenenses (six years) and S.C. Braga (two), retiring in 1980 at nearly 31 with top-division totals of 193 games and 11 goals.

Between his second and fourth clubs, Quinito played with Spain's Racing de Santander, spending three seasons in La Liga. On 28 November 1976, he scored twice in a 4–3 home win against Real Betis.

== Coaching career ==
One year after retiring, Quinito started coaching with his last club Braga, being dismissed after the 13th round of the 1981–82 season. Until the end of the decade he worked exclusively in his country's top flight, reaching the fourth position in 1984 with precisely the Minho side.

Quinito started the 1988–89 campaign at the helm of FC Porto. Even though the team collected no losses in the first 11 matches they only won five, and he was relieved of his duties as the northerners eventually lost the title race to S.L. Benfica. The manager also spent three seasons in the second tier, notably achieving promotion in 1996 with his first club as a player, Vitória de Setúbal.

After the ninth round of 1997–98, Quinito replaced fired Jaime Pacheco and led Vitória de Guimarães to the third position, with the subsequent qualification to the UEFA Cup. It was his second spell at the Estádio D. Afonso Henriques, following the fourth place of 1995.

Between 2008 and 2010, Quinito was an assistant coach of José Couceiro at Gaziantepspor from Turkey. Also in that decade, he worked as a director of football at Vitória Setúbal for four years.
