= Vitória S.C. =

Portuguese association football club

Vitória de Guimarães
- Full name: Vitória Sport Clube
- Nicknames: Os Conquistadores (The Conquerors); Os Vimaranenses (The Ones from Guimarães); Os Branquinhos (The Little Whites)
- Founded: 22 September 1922; 104 years ago
- Stadium: Estádio D. Afonso Henriques
- Capacity: 30,029
- Owner(s): Vitória Sport Clube (50,84%) V Sports (Nassef Sawiris, Wes Edens & Aitaros) (46%) Minority shareholders (3,16%)
- President: Rui Rodrigues
- Head coach: Tiago Margarido
- League: Primeira Liga
- 2025–26: Primeira Liga, 9th of 18
- Website: www.vitoriasc.pt
Home colours	Away colours	Third colours

Vitória Sport Clube, commonly known as Vitória de Guimarães, or simply Vitória, is a Portuguese professional association football club based in Guimarães that competes in the Primeira Liga, the top flight of Portuguese football, at the Estádio D. Afonso Henriques. The club also stands out on the national and international scene in other sports.

It is currently the club with the fourth highest number of seasons at the top level of Portuguese football, totalling 81, and also the club with the fourth highest number of members, around 39,000. It also has the fourth best average stadium attendance in Portugal, well ahead of its direct rivals.

Vitória Guimarães have finished third in the Primeira Liga on four occasions, most recently in 2007–08. They have won one Taça de Portugal in 2012–13, one Taça da Liga in 2025–26 and one Supertaça Cândido de Oliveira in 1988, while also being runners-up of the former on six occasions. These three different achievements mean that Vitória SC is now the fourth Portuguese club to have won all the national cups, something only matched by the big three.

The club have competed regularly in European competitions, where their best finish was the quarter-finals of the 1986–87 UEFA Cup.

Vitória SC have a long-standing rivalry with nearby club SC Braga, with whom they contest the Derby do Minho. In addition to this age-old rivalry, Vitória has another major dispute with Boavista from the city of Porto.

== History ==
=== The origins of Vitória Sport Clube (1913–1922) ===
Vitória Sport Clube owes its origins to a group of young students who set up a football team, made up of two teams, the 1st team being Sport Club Vimaranense and the 2nd team being Foot-ball Grupo Vimaranense, in 1913, a date that some researchers point to as the true founding date of the club, which in 1918 was given its current name.

The club was founded on 22 September 1922, the official date of its foundation, the club set up its first board of directors after one of the Victorian gatherings that took place at the Chapelaria Macedo and was affiliated to the Braga Football Association in its first year of operation.

=== 20th century (1922–2000) ===
Evolution of Vitória Sport Clube's league performances since 1938

Vitória's first emblem was created by Capitão Mário Cardoso in the late 1920s and depicts Afonso Henriques, the first King of Portugal, a symbol that inspires a club of conquerors, of fearless men who courageously fight for their goals.

After seasons of hard work, which culminated in winning several titles in Braga's AF league, the Conquistadores were promoted to the Primeira Liga in 1941, and two seasons later battled the Sadinos from Setúbal for the first time in the League. Against the odds, he reached his first Portuguese Cup final in their debut season, but lost to Belenenses 2–0.

Throughout the 20th century, Vitória Sport Clube was a possible contender to win the Portuguese Cup, reaching the final in 1942, 1963, 1976 and 1988. However, they were always defeated and avoided winning their first national trophy.

In 1980, Pimenta Machado took over the leadership of the club and since then, Vitória has been one of the leading clubs in Portuguese football, participating several times in European competitions.

Vitória's furthest progress in a European tournament was in the 1986–87 UEFA Cup, in which they were defeated 5–2 on aggregate in the quarter-finals by West German club Borussia Mönchengladbach.

Finally, in 1988, Vitória won its first national trophy, winning the Super Cup as finalists in the Portuguese Cup against FC Porto 2–0 (aggregate result).

=== New millennium (2001–present) ===
In the early 2000s, Vitória struggled in some years to retain its status in the top Portuguese division, then named the Superliga. Those years were marked by the decline of the leadership of Pimenta Machado, former club president, who was accused on charges of embezzlement. In February 2008 he was sentenced to four years and three months of prison on a suspended sentence, though a year later he was cleared of this charge and instead ordered to pay a €4,000 fine for falsifying a document.

Despite this, in 2004–05, the club secured a fifth-place finish in the league and qualified for European competition via the UEFA Cup. The next season (2005–06), however, they were relegated to the Segunda Liga (where they last played in 1958) after finishing 17th in the Superliga, despite reaching the Taça de Portugal semi-final, having beaten Benfica in the quarter-finals. The club also failed to progress from their UEFA Cup group, as eventual winners Sevilla, Premier League outfit Bolton Wanderers and Russian team Zenit Saint Petersburg progressed.

Vitória bounced back immediately to the top-flight as runners-up to Leixões S.C. under the management of Manuel Cajuda. A joint-best third-place finish in 2007–08, guaranteeing them a place in the third qualifying round of the 2008–09 UEFA Champions League, their first such campaign. There they fell to Swiss side FC Basel 2–1 on aggregate, with a potential away goal winner by Roberto Calmon Félix being ruled out late on for offside, despite being a bad call from the referee. Vitória dropped into the 2008–09 UEFA Cup first round as a result of their elimination, and lost 4–2 on aggregate after extra time to England's Portsmouth.

Led by Rui Vitória in 2012–13, Vitória found themselves in financial problems, which caused them to lose many experienced players and bet on young players. However, they would go on to win their first Taça de Portugal title after previously losing five finals. Vitória beat rivals Braga en route to the final, where they recovered from 1–0 down against Benfica to win 2–1.

In 2016–17, Vitória made the cup final again, losing 2–1 to double winners S.L. Benfica. That September, the team left their mark in UEFA competitions, being the first team to start a game without a European player on the field. In 2019–20, Vitória SC's presence in European competition in the UEFA Europa League was essentially marked by a win in Frankfurt (2-3) over Eintracht and a draw (1-1) against Arsenal in Guimarães. In 2020–21, the club went through four managers – Tiago, João Henriques, Bino and Moreno – before finishing seventh, missing Europe by one place.

=== Centenary of Vitória SC (2022) and League Cup Glory (2026) ===
In the run-up to the club's centenary, the «Vitória Sport Clube 1922-2022» exhibition was held, retracing 100 years of the emblem from the city of Guimarães. This was done to photographically remember many of the club's most emblematic players, as well as images of the oldest pitches.

Third time's the charm! After two consecutive seasons of being eliminated in the qualifying round, Vitória finally managed, in the 2024–25 season, to successfully pass the qualifying rounds and enter the new regular phase of the Conference League called the league phase, becoming the first Portuguese club to achieve this feat. At the helm of Rui Borges side, the Conquistadores had 6 wins and a goal aggregate of 17–0. In addition to this feat, the Vimaranense club achieved the unprecedented record of 9 consecutive wins by a Portuguese club in UEFA competitions. This record was set after a 2–1 home win against FK Mladá Boleslav. Later in the season, Vitória set another record of 13 consecutive games without losing in a 2–2 draw against Real Betis.

In the 2025/26 season, Vitória secured their first League Cup trophy, historic for being the first Minho Derby in a competition final. The final took place after eliminating FC Porto 1–3 at the Estádio do Dragão in the quarter-finals, and then defeating Sporting CP 1–2 in Leiria in the semi-finals, both with comebacks. In the Minho final, Vitória again came from behind to beat Braga 2–1, winning their first League Cup trophy in history, and also becoming the first club to win the competition with only comebacks in the result.

== Sociedade anónima deportiva (SAD) ==
In February 2023, Vitória announced an agreement to sell 46% of the club's shares in a deal worth €5m to football club holding company V Sports, led by billionaires Nassef Sawiris and Wes Edens: owners of Premier League club Aston Villa. V Sports would additionally offer a credit line of up to €20m, and invest an additional €2m into sporting infrastructure. The agreement was approved at a vote of Vitória's members on 4 March 2023: approximately 88% voted in favour of the deal. However, due to UEFA rules, VSports participation had to be reduced to 29% at the time.

On 30 October 2026, the club’s members voted again on the sale of a 17% stake to V Sports, this time including a blind trust arrangement to comply with UEFA regulations. The proposal was approved by 60% of the members present at the general meeting.

President of the Board of Directors

- Rui Rodrigues

== Sports venues ==
=== D. Afonso Henriques Stadium ===
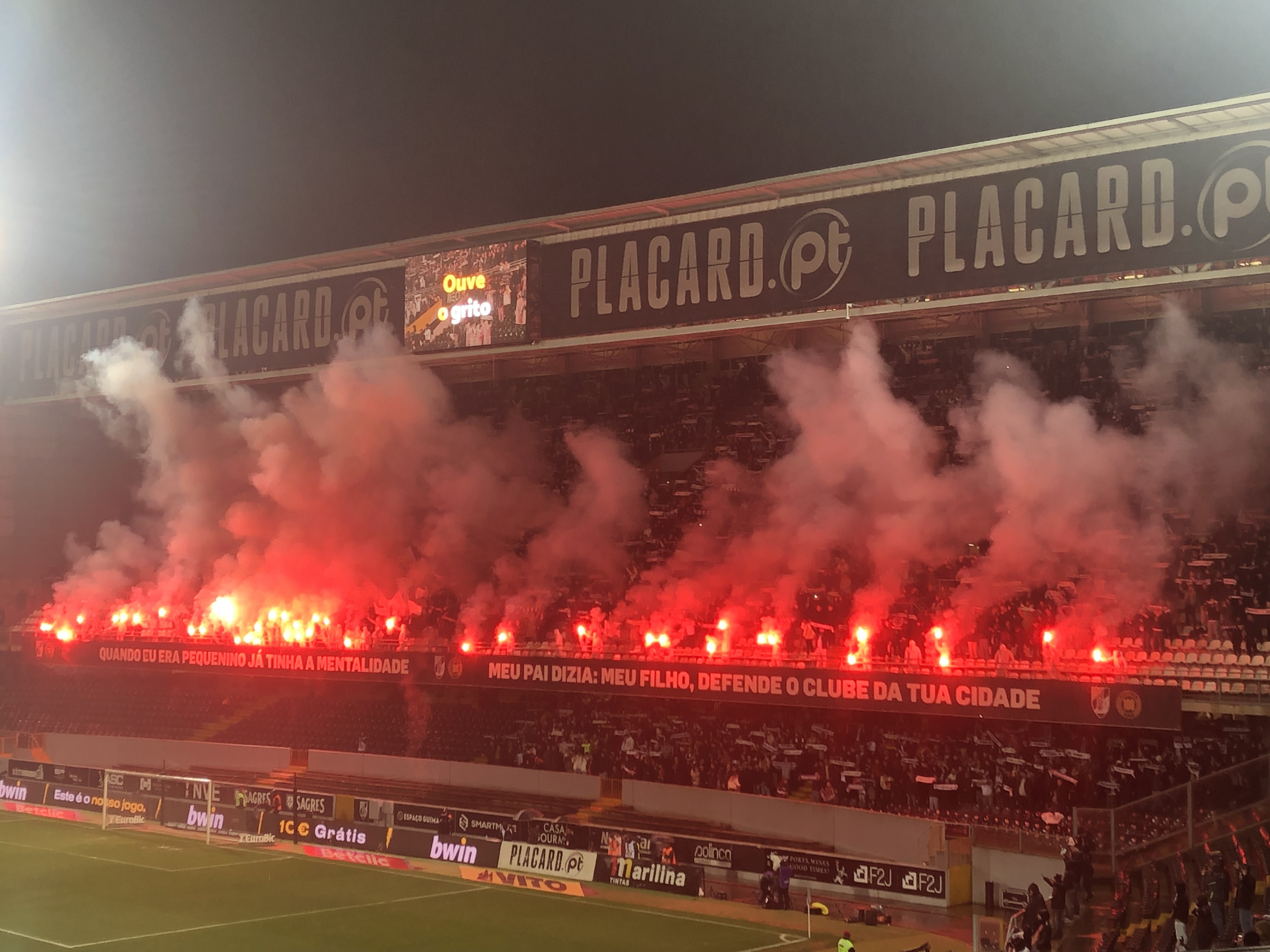
The ultras of Vitória S.C. in a match against Benfica, 11 February 2024.

They play in the Estádio D. Afonso Henriques, which has a capacity of just over 30,029. After The Big Three, Vitória is the club which attracts most supporters to the stadium, with average attendances close to 20,000 per game. Vitória usually has a higher average than all the other clubs, even when the club played in the Second League in 2006/07.

Vitória SC is the fourth club with the most fans and spectators in the country, a historic position that, except for the season when the stadium was renovated for Euro 2004, it held until the 2009/10 season, having been relegated to fifth in the 2010/11 and 2011/12 seasons due to insignificant numbers. In the 2012/13 season, it regained 4th place, despite having played 1 game behind closed doors due to a suspension, where it was deprived of the support of its fans in the stands of the Estádio D. Afonso Henriques. Since then, it has been distancing itself considerably from the other clubs, confirming that it is the fourth club with the most members and best attendances in Portugal.

=== Other Infrastructures ===
==== Vitória SC Sports Complex ====
It was opened in 1997 under the name "Complexo Desportivo Dr. Alberto Pimenta Machado", when the club had Dr. Alberto Pimenta Machado himself as president. The idea came up when, at the time, the president visited Milanello, AC Milan's sports complex.

The Sports Complex hosts the club's administrative services, the training of the senior football team and the training and games of the club's youth teams. It includes 3 natural grass fields, 3 synthetic fields (one of them for Football 7), a gym, two dozen changing rooms, a mini stadium and a sports hall, where the club's teams train and play.

==== Vitória SC Mini Stadium ====
Occupying Field 5 of the Vitória Academy and with capacity for 2,500 spectators, the home of the B team and the under-19s will appear. It will also have a presidential tribune, three bars, six changing rooms and a technical support area.

==== Vimaranense Unit Sports Pavilion ====
Inserted in the Sports Complex, the Pavilion, opened in 1997 with capacity for 2,500 spectators, is the home of Vitória SC sports, where it hosts around 600 athletes weekly between training and competitions. From the 2022/23 season to 2023/24, there was a 40 per cent increase in the average number of spectators per game. This infrastructure was therefore remodelled in the summer of 2024 in order to provide even better working and entertainment conditions for all members.

==== Guimarães Sports City ====
The Guimarães Sports City is made up of a set of equipment existing in the municipality of Guimarães intended for sports and allows the reception of major events of national and international dimensions. These facilities, such as the swimming pool complex and the athletics track, are frequently used by athletes and teams from Vitória SC's training and modalities.

== Rivalries ==
=== Rivalry with SC Braga ===
The Derby do Minho is the rivalry between Sporting Clube de Braga and Vitória Sport Clube in the Minho region of northern Portugal. This derby is marked by great tension and passion, reflecting not only sporting competition, but also a historical and cultural rivalry between the cities of Braga and Guimarães that began even before the formation of the Kingdom of Portugal. Since then it has been a struggle in all aspects of society, sport, culture, the economy. Football has only become a means used to transpose the rivalry. Considered to be one of the most exciting and fiercely contested matches in Portuguese football, the Dérbi Minhoto is eagerly awaited by the fans for the clash between these two cities known for their history and identity.

=== Rivalry with Boavista FC ===
The Conquistadores versus Panteras match against Boavista Futebol Clube is a regional contest involving the city of Guimarães and the city of Porto. Although it's not as famous as other rivalries, it's marked by tension between Vitorianos and Axadrezados fans, with each club representing the pride of its city and region. The clash is always eagerly awaited, given the great competitive history and geographical proximity between the two teams.

=== Other rivalries ===
There is also a certain rivalry between Braga, Boavista, Belenenses and Vitória SC, due to the closeness in the number of titles and because they are some of the clubs with the largest number of fans in Portugal, with many people creating arguments to determine which would be the "4th big". However, the distance between these clubs and the Big Three is considerable enough in any sport to be given such a designation.

== Honours ==
National Competitions
Competition	Titles	Seasons
Taça de Portugal	1	2012–13
Taça da Liga	1	2025–26
Supertaça Cândido de Oliveira	1	1988
Total trophies	3	3 trophies

== League and Cup history ==
Updated: June 2025. The club's 81 seasons (as in 2023) in the top level of Portuguese football make them the club with the joint-fourth longest time there, after Benfica, Porto, and Sporting CP (all with 92).

Season	League	Pos.	Pld.	W	D	L	GS	GA	Pts	Cup	League Cup	Supercup	European Competitions		Notes
1934–35	In the debut season of the I and II Division, it did not qualify for 2D through the Braga Regional Championship.									Former camp.port					AF Braga champions without the right to a place in the 1st Division (created in 1934/35). The Braga Regional Champion only had access to the 2nd Division (created in the same year).
1935–36	2D	2	6	4	1	1	22	5	9	Former camp.port					AF Braga champions without the right to a place in the 1st Division (created in 1934/35). The Braga Regional Champion only had access to the 2nd Division (created in the same year).
1936–37	2D	2	6	4	0	2	19	10	8	Former camp.port					AF Braga champions without the right to a place in the 1st Division (created in 1934/35). The Braga Regional Champion only had access to the 2nd Division (created in the same year).
1937–38	2D	2	6	3	1	2	16	12	7	Former camp.port					AF Braga champions without the right to a place in the 1st Division (created in 1934/35). The Braga Regional Champion only had access to the 2nd Division (created in the same year).
1938–39	2D C.Ql.	1 S-f	10 2	8 1	2 0	0 1	33 5	6 2	18 -	Round of 16					AF Braga champions without the right to a place in the 1st Division (created in 1934/35). The Braga Regional Champion only had access to the 2nd Division (created in the same year).
1939–40	2D C.Ql.	1 Q-f	10 1	8 0	2 1	0 0	35 2	8 2	18 -	Did not attend the tie-breaker					AF Braga champions without the right to a place in the 1st Division (created in 1934/35). The Braga Regional Champion only had access to the 2nd Division (created in the same year).
1940–41	2D C.Ql.	1 S-f	10 3	7 2	1 0	2 1	26 5	8 5	15 -	Quarter-finals					Promoted in Play-Off (6–4)
1941–42	1D	11	22	6	1	15	43	76	13	Runner-up					
1942–43	1D	8	18	6	2	10	48	76	14	Round of 16					
1943–44	1D	8	18	2	3	13	25	68	7	Semi-finals					
1944–45	1D	8	18	4	3	11	32	57	11	Round of 16					
1945–46	1D	8	22	8	2	12	39	52	18	Quarter-finals					
1946–47	1D	8	26	8	8	10	54	54	24	Not held					
1947–48	1D	7	26	10	4	12	44	56	24	Round of 32					
1948–49	1D	6	26	11	4	11	47	50	26	Round of 16					
1949–50	1D	11	26	7	7	12	45	59	21	Not held					
1950–51	1D	13	26	6	6	14	40	57	18	Quarter-finals					
1951–52	1D	10	26	9	3	14	28	47	21	Round of 16					
1952–53	1D	8	26	7	6	13	28	54	20	Semi-finals					
1953–54	1D	8	26	10	5	11	44	64	25	Quarter-finals					
1954–55	1D	14	26	5	7	14	33	49	17	Round of 32					Relegated
1955–56	2D C.Ql.	2 2	26 10	18 6	2 1	6 3	69 18	38 15	38 13	Did not participate					Lost in the Play-Off (1–1 / 0–1)
1956–57	2D C.Ql.	3 3	26 10	15 6	7 2	4 2	67 28	34 15	37 14	Did not participate					
1957–58	2D C.Ql.	1 2	26 10	19 5	3 2	4 3	82 22	35 16	41 12	Did not participate					Promoted in Play-Off (2–1 / 2–2)
1958–59	1D	5	26	13	3	10	59	55	29	Round of 16					
1959–60	1D	7	26	8	7	11	47	43	23	Quarter-finals					
1960–61	1D	4	26	14	2	10	48	44	30	Round of 16					
1961–62	1D	9	26	9	4	13	44	47	22	Semi-finals					
1962–63	1D	6	26	12	3	11	47	43	27	Runner-up					
1963–64	1D	4	26	16	2	8	62	42	34	Round of 16					
1964–65	1D	7	26	12	5	9	44	36	29	Round of 16					
1965–66	1D	4	26	14	5	7	58	47	33	Round of 32					
1966–67	1D	6	26	11	4	11	35	40	26	Round of 16					
1967–68	1D	6	26	12	3	11	31	34	27	Quarter-finals					
1968–69	1D	3	26	13	10	3	46	17	36	Quarter-finals					
1969–70	1D	5	26	12	4	10	38	36	28	Quarter-finals			ICFC	First round	
1970–71	1D	12	26	4	11	11	15	27	19	Round of 32			ICFC	Second round	
1971–72	1D	6	30	11	8	11	49	47	30	Round of 16					UEFA Cup debut
1972–73	1D	6	30	11	11	8	38	38	33	Round of 16					
1973–74	1D	6	30	10	11	9	36	34	31	Round of 32			IC	Runner-up	
1974–75	1D	5	30	16	6	8	64	36	38	Round of 16					
1975–76	1D	6	30	13	10	7	49	32	36	Runner-up			IC	Runner-up	
1976–77	1D	9	30	10	6	14	39	38	26	Round of 16					
1977–78	1D	6	30	12	7	11	33	28	31	Round of 64		Not held so far			
1978–79	1D	6	30	12	7	11	44	38	31	Round of 16					
1979–80	1D	6	30	11	10	9	42	38	32	Round of 32					
1980–81	1D	5	30	11	9	10	38	30	31	Round of 128					
1981–82	1D	4	30	13	12	5	42	22	38	Round of 32					
1982–83	1D	4	30	11	10	9	35	24	32	Round of 32					
1983–84	1D	6	30	14	3	13	41	41	31	Semi-finals			UC	First round	
1984–85	1D	9	30	9	7	14	33	39	25	Round of 16					
1985–86	1D	4	30	16	8	6	51	29	40	Round of 16					
1986–87	1D	3	30	14	13	3	45	22	41	Quarter-finals			UC	Quarter-finals	
1987–88	1D	14	38	11	11	16	48	50	33	Runner-up			UC	Third round	
1988–89	1D	9	38	14	10	14	39	33	38	Round of 32		Winner	CWC	First round	
1989–90	1D	4	34	17	11	6	46	28	45	Semi-finals					
1990–91	1D	9	38	12	10	16	31	40	34	Round of 16			UC	First round	
1991–92	1D	5	34	14	13	7	46	35	41	Round of 32					
1992–93	1D	11	34	14	3	17	41	53	31	Semi-finals			UC	Second round	
1993–94	1D	7	34	11	11	12	30	31	33	Round of 32					
1994–95	1D	4	34	16	10	8	54	43	42	Round of 32					
1995–96	1D	5	34	19	5	10	55	39	62	Quarter-finals			UC	Second round	
1996–97	1D	5	34	15	8	11	51	46	53	Round of 64			UC	Second round	
1997–98	1D	3	34	17	8	9	42	25	59	Round of 64			UC	First round	
1998–99	1D	7	34	14	8	12	53	41	50	Round of 32			UC	First round	Cup Winners' Cup extinct
1999–00	1D	7	34	14	6	14	48	43	48	Quarter-finals					
2000–01	1D	15	34	9	9	16	41	49	36	Round of 64					
2001–02	1D	9	34	11	9	14	35	41	42	Round of 32					
2002–03	1D	4	34	14	8	12	47	46	50	Round of 16					
2003–04	1D	14	34	9	10	15	31	40	37	Round of 32					
2004–05	1D	5	34	15	9	10	38	29	54	Round of 16					
2005–06	1D	17	34	8	10	16	28	41	34	Semi-finals			UC	Group stage	Relegated
2006–07	2D	2	30	16	7	7	44	20	55	Round of 256	Not held so far				Promoted
2007–08	1D	3	30	15	8	7	35	31	53	Round of 16	3rd round				
2008–09	1D	8	30	10	8	12	32	36	38	Quarter-finals	Semi-finals		CL	3rd quali round	
2008–09	1D	8	30	10	8	12	32	36	38	Quarter-finals	Semi-finals		UC	First round	
2009–10	1D	6	30	11	8	11	31	34	41	Round of 16	Group stage				Name changed to Europa League
2010–11	1D	5	30	12	7	11	36	36	43	Runner-up	Group stage				
2011–12	1D	6	30	14	3	13	40	40	45	Round of 32	Group stage	Runner-up	EL	Play-off round	
2012–13	1D	9	30	11	7	12	36	47	40	Winner	Group stage				
2013–14	1D	10	30	10	5	15	30	35	35	Round of 32	1st round	Runner-up	EL	Group stage	
2014–15	1D	5	34	15	10	9	50	35	55	Round of 32	Group stage				
2015–16	1D	10	34	9	13	12	45	53	40	Round of 64	2nd round		EL	3rd quali round	
2016–17	1D	4	34	18	8	8	50	39	62	Runner-up	Group stage				
2017–18	1D	9	34	13	4	17	45	56	43	Round of 16	Group stage	Runner-up	EL	Group stage	
2018–19	1D	5	34	15	7	12	46	34	52	Quarter-finals	2nd round				
2019–20	1D	7	34	13	11	10	53	38	50	Round of 64	Semi-finals		EL	Group stage	
2020–21	1D	7	34	12	7	15	37	44	43	Round of 32	Quarter-finals				
2021–22	1D	6	34	13	9	12	50	41	48	Round of 32	Group stage				Conference League debut
2022–23	1D	6	34	16	5	13	34	39	53	Round of 16	Group stage		ECL	3rd quali round	
2023–24	1D	5	34	19	6	9	52	38	63	Semi-finals	2nd round		ECL	2nd quali round	
2024–25	1D	6	34	14	12	8	47	37	54	Round of 16	Quarter-finals		ECL	Round of 16	

Legend:
Pos. = Position in the League Table; Pld. = Matches Played; W = Wins; D = Draws; L = Losses;
GS = Goals Scored; GA = Goals Against; Pts = Points; C.Ql = Champion Qualification
CL = UEFA Champions League; CWC = UEFA Cup Winners' Cup; UC = UEFA Cup; EL = UEFA Europa League;
ECL = UEFA Europa Conference League; IC = UEFA Intertoto Cup; ICFC = Inter-Cities Fairs Cup.

Winner	Runner-up	Semi-final	Promotion	Relegation

== European matches ==
Season	Competition	Round	Opponent	Home	Away	Aggregate
1969–70	Inter-Cities Fairs Cup	First round	(Czechoslovakia) Baník Ostrava	1–0	1–1	2–1
1969–70	Inter-Cities Fairs Cup	Second round	(England) Southampton	3–3	1–5	4–8
1970–71	Inter-Cities Fairs Cup	First round	(France) Angoulême	3–0	1–3	4–3
1970–71	Inter-Cities Fairs Cup	Second round	(Scotland) Hibernian	2–1	0–2	2–3
1973–74	Intertoto Cup	Group 2	(Sweden) Djurgården	5–0	1–3	2nd place
1973–74	Intertoto Cup	Group 2	(Switzerland) Neuchâtel Xamax	5–2	1–0	2nd place
1973–74	Intertoto Cup	Group 2	(West Germany) Hamburger SV	3–1	0–2	2nd place
1975–76	Intertoto Cup	Group 7	(Belgium) Oostende	4–1	0–2	2nd place
1975–76	Intertoto Cup	Group 7	(Denmark) Holbæk B&I	4–0	2–1	2nd place
1975–76	Intertoto Cup	Group 7	(Czechoslovakia) Inter Bratislava	1–0	0–4	2nd place
1983–84	UEFA Cup	First round	(England) Aston Villa	1–0	0–5	1–5
1986–87	UEFA Cup	First round	(Czechoslovakia) Sparta Prague	2–1	1–1	3–2
1986–87	UEFA Cup	Second round	(Spain) Atlético Madrid	2–0	0–1	2–1
1986–87	UEFA Cup	Third round	(Netherlands) Groningen	3–0	0–1	3–1
1986–87	UEFA Cup	Quarter-finals	(West Germany) Borussia Mönchengladbach	2–2	0–3	2–5
1987–88	UEFA Cup	First round	(Hungary) Tatabánya	1–0	1–1	2–1
1987–88	UEFA Cup	Second round	(Belgium) Beveren	1–0	0–1 (a.e.t.)	1–1 (5–4 p)
1987–88	UEFA Cup	Third round	(Czechoslovakia) TJ Vitkovice	2–0	0–2 (a.e.t.)	2–2 (4–5 p)
1988–89	European Cup Winners' Cup	First round	(Netherlands) Roda	1–0	0–2	1–2
1990–91	UEFA Cup	First round	(Turkey) Fenerbahçe	2–3	0–3	2–6
1992–93	UEFA Cup	First round	(Spain) Real Sociedad	3–0	0–2	3–2
1992–93	UEFA Cup	Second round	(Netherlands) Ajax	0–3	1–2	1–5
1995–96	UEFA Cup	First round	(Belgium) Standard Liège	3–1	0–0	3–1
1995–96	UEFA Cup	Second round	(Spain) Barcelona	0–4	0–3	0–7
1996–97	UEFA Cup	First round	(Italy) Parma	2–0	1–2	3–2
1996–97	UEFA Cup	Second round	(Belgium) Anderlecht	1–1	0–0	1–1 (a)
1997–98	UEFA Cup	First round	(Italy) Lazio	0–4	1–2	1–6
1998–99	UEFA Cup	First round	(Scotland) Celtic	1–2	1–2	2–4
2005–06	UEFA Cup	First round	(Poland) Wisła Kraków	3–0	1–0	4–0
2005–06	UEFA Cup	Group H	(Russia) Zenit Saint Petersburg	—N/a	1–2	5th place
2005–06	UEFA Cup	Group H	(England) Bolton Wanderers	1–1	—N/a	5th place
2005–06	UEFA Cup	Group H	(Spain) Sevilla	—N/a	1–3	5th place
2005–06	UEFA Cup	Group H	(Turkey) Beşiktaş	1–3	—N/a	5th place
2008–09	UEFA Champions League	Third qualifying round	(Switzerland) Basel	0–0	1–2	1–2
2008–09	UEFA Cup	First round	(England) Portsmouth	2–2	0–2	2–4
2011–12	UEFA Europa League	Third qualifying round	(Denmark) Midtjylland	2–1	0–0	2–1
2011–12	UEFA Europa League	Play-off round	(Spain) Atlético Madrid	0–4	0–2	0–6
2013–14	UEFA Europa League	Group I	(France) Lyon	1–2	1–1	3rd place
2013–14	UEFA Europa League	Group I	(Spain) Real Betis	0–1	0–1	3rd place
2013–14	UEFA Europa League	Group I	(Croatia) Rijeka	4–0	0–0	3rd place
2015–16	UEFA Europa League	Third qualifying round	(Austria) Altach	1–4	1–2	2–6
2017–18	UEFA Europa League	Group I	(Austria) RB Salzburg	1–1	0–3	4th place
2017–18	UEFA Europa League	Group I	(France) Marseille	1–0	1–2	4th place
2017–18	UEFA Europa League	Group I	(Turkey) Konyaspor	1–1	1–2	4th place
2019–20	UEFA Europa League	Second qualifying round	(Luxembourg) Jeunesse Esch	4–0	1–0	5–0
2019–20	UEFA Europa League	Third qualifying round	(Latvia) FK Ventspils	6–0	3–0	9–0
2019–20	UEFA Europa League	Play-off round	(Romania) FCSB	1–0	0–0	1–0
2019–20	UEFA Europa League	Group F	(England) Arsenal	1–1	2–3	4th place
2019–20	UEFA Europa League	Group F	(Germany) Eintracht Frankfurt	0–1	3–2	4th place
2019–20	UEFA Europa League	Group F	(Belgium) Standard Liège	1–1	0–2	4th place
2022–23	UEFA Conference League	Second qualifying round	(Hungary) Puskás Akadémia	3–0	0–0	3–0
2022–23	UEFA Conference League	Third qualifying round	(Croatia) Hajduk Split	1–0	1–3	2–3
2023–24	UEFA Conference League	Second qualifying round	(Slovenia) Celje	0–1 (a.e.t.)	4–3	4–4 (2–4 p)
2024–25	UEFA Conference League	Second qualifying round	(Malta) Floriana	1–0	4–0	5–0
2024–25	UEFA Conference League	Third qualifying round	(Switzerland) Zürich	2–0	3–0	5–0
2024–25	UEFA Conference League	Play-off round	(Bosnia and Herzegovina) Zrinjski Mostar	3–0	4–0	7–0
2024–25	UEFA Conference League	League phase	(Slovenia) Celje	3–1	—N/a	2nd place
2024–25	UEFA Conference League	League phase	(Sweden) Djurgårdens IF	—N/a	2–1	2nd place
2024–25	UEFA Conference League	League phase	(Czech Republic) Mladá Boleslav	2–1	—N/a	2nd place
2024–25	UEFA Conference League	League phase	(Kazakhstan) Astana	—N/a	1–1	2nd place
2024–25	UEFA Conference League	League phase	(Switzerland) St. Gallen	—N/a	4–1	2nd place
2024–25	UEFA Conference League	League phase	(Italy) Fiorentina	1–1	—N/a	2nd place
2024–25	UEFA Conference League	Round of 16	(Spain) Real Betis	0–4	2–2	2–6

== Players ==
=== Current squad ===
As of 15 September 2026

Note: Flags indicate national team as defined under FIFA eligibility rules; some limited exceptions apply. Players may hold more than one non-FIFA nationality.

No.	Pos.	Nation	Player
2	DF	POR	Miguel Maga
4	DF	ESP	Óscar Rivas
5	DF	FRA	Ahmed Sidibé (on loan from Venezia)
6	MF	SRB	Matija Mitrović
7	FW	FRA	Oumar Camara
8	MF	POR	Gonçalo Nogueira
9	FW	AUT	Arnel Jakupović
10	MF	BRA	Alan
11	FW	BRA	Gustavo Silva
13	DF	POR	João Mendes
15	DF	COL	Yeimar Mosquera
16	MF	ANG	Beni Mukendi
17	MF	POR	Miguel Nogueira
18	FW	CPV	Telmo Arcanjo
19	MF	SWE	Victor Andersson

No.	Pos.	Nation	Player
20	MF	POR	Samu (captain)
21	DF	CRO	Toni Borevković (on loan from Samsunspor)
22	GK	COL	Juan Castillo
23	DF	ROU	Tony Strata
24	FW	SEN	Alioune Ndoye
28	DF	BRA	Thiago Balieiro
29	FW	CIV	Patrick Ouotro
35	MF	ESP	Fabio Blanco
44	MF	BFA	Lohann Doucet
45	MF	POR	Marco Cruz
48	GK	POL	Oliwier Zych (on loan from Aston Villa)
56	MF	POR	Santiago Verdi
80	MF	POR	Rica Rocha
82	DF	POR	Francisco Dias
98	GK	BRA	Lucas Furtado

=== Out on loan ===
Note: Flags indicate national team as defined under FIFA eligibility rules; some limited exceptions apply. Players may hold more than one non-FIFA nationality.

No.	Pos.	Nation	Player
—	DF	POR	Miguel Nóbrega (at União de Leiria until 30 June 2027)

== Club staff ==
Position	Staff
President	(Portugal) António Miguel Cardoso
Technical Director	(Portugal) Carlos Campos
Sporting Director	(Portugal) Rogério Matias
Director of Football	(Portugal) Flávio Meireles
Head coach	(Portugal) Luís Pinto
Assistant Head Coach	TBA
First-Team Coach	TBA
Goalkeeper Coach	(Brazil) Douglas Jesus
Head of Scouting	TBA
Physiotherapist	(Portugal) Pedro Figueiredo (Portugal) Frederico Neto
Team Manager	(Portugal) Rui Carvalho

=== Managerial history ===
Dates	Name	Picture	Notes
1922-1979	To be filled		
1979-1980	(Argentina) Mario Imbelloni		
1980	(Portugal) Cassiano Gouveia		
1980	(Portugal) Fernando Peres		
1980-1981	(Portugal) Manuel José		
1981-1982	(Portugal) José Maria Pedroto		
1982-1983	(Portugal) Manuel José		
1983-1984	(Austria) Hermann Stessl		
1984-1985	(Belgium) Raymond Goethals		
1985-1986	(Portugal) António Morais		
1986-1987	(Brazil) Marinho Peres		
1987-1988	(Portugal) António Oliveira		
1988-1989	(Brazil) Geninho		
1989-1990	(Brazil) Paulo Autuori		
1991-1992	(Portugal) João Alves		
1992-1993	(Brazil) Marinho Peres		
1993-1994	(Portugal) Bernardino Pedroto		
1994-1995	(Portugal) Quinito		
1995	(Portugal) Vítor Oliveira		
1995-1996	(Portugal) Manuel Machado		Caretaker
1996	(Portugal) Romeu Silva		
1996-1997	(Portugal) Jaime Pacheco		
1997-1998	(Portugal) Quinito		
1998	(Serbia and Montenegro) Zoran Filipović		
1999-2000	(Portugal) Quinito		
2000	(Brazil) Paulo Autuori		
2000-2001	(Portugal) Álvaro Magalhães		
2001-2003	(Portugal) Augusto Inácio		
2003-2004	(Portugal) Jorge Jesus		
2004-2005	(Portugal) Manuel Machado		
2005	(Portugal) Jaime Pacheco		
2005-2006	(Portugal) Vítor Pontes		
2006	(Portugal) Luís Norton de Matos		
2006-2009	(Portugal) Manuel Cajuda		
2009	(Portugal) Nelo Vingada		
2009	(Portugal) Basílio Marques		Interim
2009-2010	(Portugal) Paulo Sérgio		
2010-2011	(Portugal) Manuel Machado		
2011	(Portugal) Basílio Marques		Interim
2011-2015	(Portugal) Rui Vitória		
2015	(Portugal) Armando Evangelista		
2015-2016	(Portugal) Sérgio Conceição		
2016-2018	(Portugal) Pedro Martins		
2018	(Portugal) Vítor Campelos		Interim
2018	(Portugal) José Peseiro		
2018-2019	(Portugal) Luís Castro		
2019-2020	(Portugal) Ivo Vieira		
2020	(Portugal) Tiago Mendes		
2020-2021	(Portugal) João Henrique		
2021	(Portugal) Bino		Caretaker
2021	(Portugal) Moreno		Caretaker
2021-2022	(Portugal) Pepa		
2022-2023	(Portugal) Moreno		
2023	(Portugal) Paulo Turra		
2023-2024	(Portugal) Álvaro Pacheco		
2024	(Portugal) Rui Miguel Pinto Cunha		Interim
2024	(Portugal) Rui Borges		
2024–2025	(Portugal) Daniel Sousa		
2025-2025	(Portugal) Luís Freire		
2025- present	(Portugal) Luis Pinto		

== Modalities ==
=== Basketball ===
Vitória S.C. has a professional men's and women's basketball team that play at the highest level of the sport, respectively in the LPB and in the LFB.

Men's Achievements

National Competitions
Competition	Titles	Seasons	Runners-up
LPB	0	-	2013/14, 2014/15
Proliga	1	2006/07	2007/08
Taça de Portugal	2	2007/08, 2012/13	-
Supertaça	0	-	2008, 2013
Taça Hugo dos Santos	0	-	2014/15
Troféu António Pratas	1	2009/10	-
Total Trophies	4	4 Nationals	6 Runner-up

Women's Achievements

National Competitions
Competition	Titles	Seasons	Runners-up
1ª Divisão	1	2016/17	-
Taça de Portugal	0		2018/19, 2020/21
Supertaça	0	-	2019/20, 2021/22
Total Trophies	1	1 Nationals	4 Runner-up

=== Handball ===
Vitória S.C. has a professional handball team that plays in the first division Andebol 1.

Men's Achievements

National Competitions
Competition	Titles	Seasons	Runners-up
Andebol 1	0	-	-
Andebol 2	1	2022/23	-
Andebol 3	1	2020/21	-
Total Trophies	2	2 Nationals	0 Runner-up

=== Volleyball ===
Vitória S.C. has a professional men's and women's volleyball team that play at the highest level of the sport, respectively in the Portuguese Volleyball League A1 and in the First Division Women's Volleyball League.

Men's Achievements

National Competitions
Competition	Titles	Seasons	Runners-up
Campeonato Nacional I (A1)	1	2007/08	2005/06, 2006/07, 2008/09
Campeonato Nacional I (A2)	1	2000/01	-
Campeonato Nacional II	1	1999/00	-
Taça de Portugal	1	2008/09	2002/03, 2003/04, 2007/08, 2012/13
Supertaça	0	-	-
Taça Federação	1	2018/19	2016/17
Total Trophies	5	5 Nationals	8 Runner-up

Women's Achievements

National Competitions
Competition	Titles	Seasons	Runners-up
Campeonato Nacional I	0	-	-
Campeonato Nacional II	2	1980/81, 2006/07	-
Taça de Portugal	0	-	2021/22, 2024/25
Supertaça	0	-	-
Taça Federação	1	2023/24	-
Total Trophies	3	3 Nationals	2 Runner-up

=== Water polo ===
Vitória S.C. has a semi-professional water polo team that plays in the Portuguese Waterpolo First Division.

National Competitions
Competition	Titles	Seasons	Runners-up
Primeira Divisão	6	2018/19, 2020/21, 2021/22, 2022/23, 2024/25, 2025/26	2023/24
Segunda Divisão	1	2003/04	-
Taça de Portugal	3	2020/21, 2024/25, 2025/26	2018/19, 2021/22, 2023/24
Supertaça	5	2019, 2021, 2023, 2024, 2025	2022
Total Trophies	15	15 Nationals	5 Runner-up

=== Cycling Team ===
Vitória S.C. already had a professional cycling team, at the beginning of the 21st century, with the European status of UCI Continental Tour. The team code UCI: ASC, participated mainly in national competitions such as the famous Tour of Portugal.

=== Beach soccer ===
Vitória SC's Beach Soccer section has been temporarily inactive since 2015. It stands out historically for being the 2nd team to win the Beach Soccer Elite Championship, its only national title having been won in 2011.
