= List of FC Porto managers =

Futebol Clube do Porto is a Portuguese sports club based in Porto that is best known for its professional football team playing in the country's top-tier division, the Primeira Liga. Founded in 1893, the club soon entered a period of inactivity until its revival in 1906 by a group of people led by future president José Monteiro da Costa. The following year, Monteiro da Costa invited Adolphe Cassaigne, a Frenchman, to become the football team's first official head coach, replacing Italian player-coach Catullo Gadda.

As of the end of the 2025–26 season, Porto have had 72 managers of 16 nationalities, eight of which assumed caretaking roles. A total of 30 managers completed at least one season with the club, and 28 won at least one title. Hungary's József Szabó is Porto's most successful manager with 12 titles, including 10 regional championships. Excluding regional honours, the most successful manager is Sérgio Conceição, with eleven titles. Tomislav Ivić and André Villas-Boas share the club record for most titles in a single season, with four.

The current manager is Francesco Farioli, who replaced Martín Anselmi after the club rescinded contract with the Argentine coach at the end of the 2024–25 season, just five months after his appointment. Farioli is the fourth Italian manager in Porto's history, and the first since Luigi Del Neri's brief spell in 2004.

== History ==
=== 1906–48: First coach and Hungarian era ===
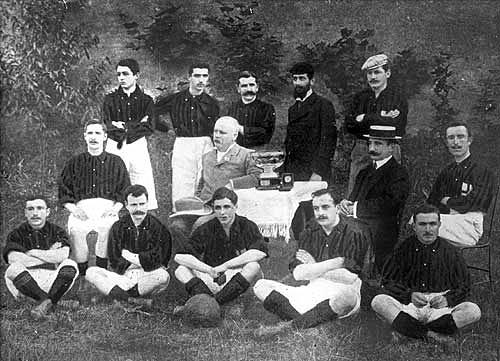
Catullo Gadda (back row, second from left ) won the 1901 Italian championship with Milan (squad pictured) before becoming Porto's player and first manager.

Following the club's rebirth in 1906, Catullo Gadda, who won the Italian title with Milan in 1901, assumed the team's orientation as a player-coach and is historically considered Porto's first-ever manager. The following year, club president José Monteiro da Costa invited Adolphe Cassaigne, a Frenchman who worked with local school football teams, to become Porto's first full-time manager. Cassaigne led the team to victories in the 1914–15 Campeonato do Porto and the 1922 Campeonato de Portugal, the club's first regional and national titles. Ahead of the 1922–23 season, Cassaigne was succeeded by Ákos Teszler, who signed the first professional coaching contract in Portuguese football. Under the Hungarian's leadership, Porto won five successive regional championship titles and secured their second Campeonato de Portugal in 1924–25.

At the end of the 1926–27 season, Teszler abandoned the club; one of his players, Alexandre Cal, took over the team temporarily and secured another regional title. Cal gave way to another Hungarian manager, József Szabó, who would win more titles for the club (10) than any other after him. He won a record eight consecutive Campeonato do Porto titles – raising the club's tally to 21 in 23 seasons – and led the club in an unbeaten 1931–32 campaign that secured both regional and national titles. The 1934–35 season saw the birth of the Primeira Liga, a nationwide competition contested in a home-and-away round-robin format; Porto were the inaugural winners, ahead of Sporting CP and Benfica. Szabó left Porto after three matches into the 1936–37 Primeira Liga. Two other Hungarian coaches – Mihály Siska, a former club goalkeeper, and Magyar Ferenc, who inflicted heavy defeats upon Sporting CP (10–1), Belenenses (9–1) and Braga (11–0) – took charge until the end of the season, but failed to win a trophy. Magyar's successor was Austrian coach François Gutkas, who continued Porto's regional dominance with a 19th title, and won the club's fourth and final Campeonato de Portugal in 1937. Siska returned the following season; in his five-season tenure, Porto collected three more regional titles and won two consecutive league titles for the first time (1938–39 and 1939–40).

For the 1942–43 season, Porto hired Lippo Hertzka, a Hungarian manager who had won the La Liga with Real Madrid and three consecutive league titles with Benfica. Although successful in the regional championship, Hertzka performed poorly at national level. In three years, Porto never finished top three in the league, and in his first season, the club had its second-worst league placing ever (seventh). During this period, Porto also suffered their heaviest defeat against Benfica, 12–2. Hertzka was replaced by Szabó, but his second spell with Porto was less successful, winning only two regional titles. Midway through the 1947–48 pre-season, Szabó resigned and Porto asked former player Carlos Nunes to temporarily assume the head coach position. Before the beginning of the season, Porto hired Eladio Vaschetto, a retired Argentine player with no previous coaching experience. Vaschetto's biggest achievement was a 3–2 win over English champions Arsenal in a friendly match played on 6 May 1948, which was immortalised by the colossal Taça Arsenal (Arsenal Cup).

=== 1948–76: First double and title droughts ===
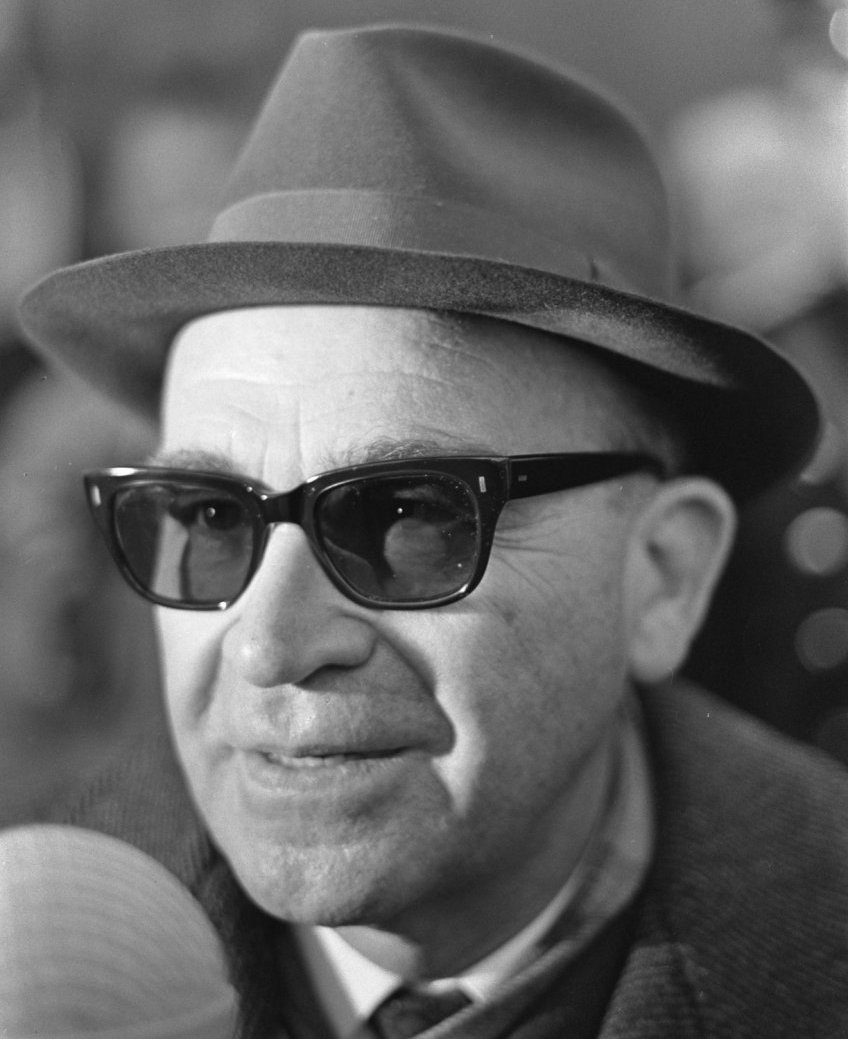
Béla Guttmann guided Porto to its fifth league title in 1958–59.

After Vaschetto's exit in the summer of 1948, Porto had ten coaches in a period of seven years – including Vaschetto again, who returned for the first half of the 1951–52 season – but none were able to bring any silverware for the club. The lack of trophies was accentuated with the abolition of the regional championship in 1947, which Porto had dominated with 30 wins in 34 seasons. The club returned to winning ways in the 1955–56 season, under the orientation of its first Brazilian coach, Dorival Knippel, better known as Yustrich. The 1955–56 Primeira Divisão title was secured through a head-to-head tiebreak with Benfica, after both teams finished with the same points. The following month, Yustrich guided Porto to its first Taça de Portugal title, securing thus the club's first double. The Brazilian left Porto soon after, but returned a year later to replace his compatriot Flávio Costa, after a trophyless season.

Yustrich left Porto definitively after failing to win the 1957–58 league, but his successor and countryman, Otto Bumbel, took the team to the Taça de Portugal final, where they defeated Benfica. Bumbel led Porto in the first eight matches of the 1958–59 Primeira Divisão, but after two successive draws, he was replaced by Béla Guttmann. The experienced Hungarian coach won the club's fifth league title by a one-goal margin over Benfica, but could not overcome them in the Taça de Portugal final. The following season, Guttmann moved to Benfica, where he would win two consecutive European Cup titles. After his exit, Porto entered another long period of silverware drought, despite the signing of experienced and successful coaches such as Ferdinand Daučík (Spanish champion with Barcelona and Atlético Madrid) and Otto Glória (Taça de Portugal winner with Benfica and Belenenses).

For the 1966–67 season, Porto brought in its former captain and Portuguese international José Maria Pedroto. He would serve the club as head coach on three separate spells and become the coach with the most official games for Porto. Most importantly for the club, Pedroto would also help lay the foundations for a continuously competitive team that could battle in equal terms against both domestic and foreign opponents. After a fruitless debut season, Pedroto put an end to the club's nine-year run without winning a trophy by securing its third Taça de Portugal in June 1968. The following season, Porto came close to win the league title, but compromising results in the last matches consigned the team to a runner-up finish, which led to Pedroto's resignation. Similarly to the post-Guttmann years, Porto spent several seasons without winning a domestic title after Pedroto's resignation. During this period, the club hired several coaches with successful career records – Elek Schwartz, Tommy Docherty, Fernando Riera, Aymoré Moreira, and Branko Stanković – but neither delivered the long-awaited league title.

=== 1976–88: Return of Pedroto and international success ===
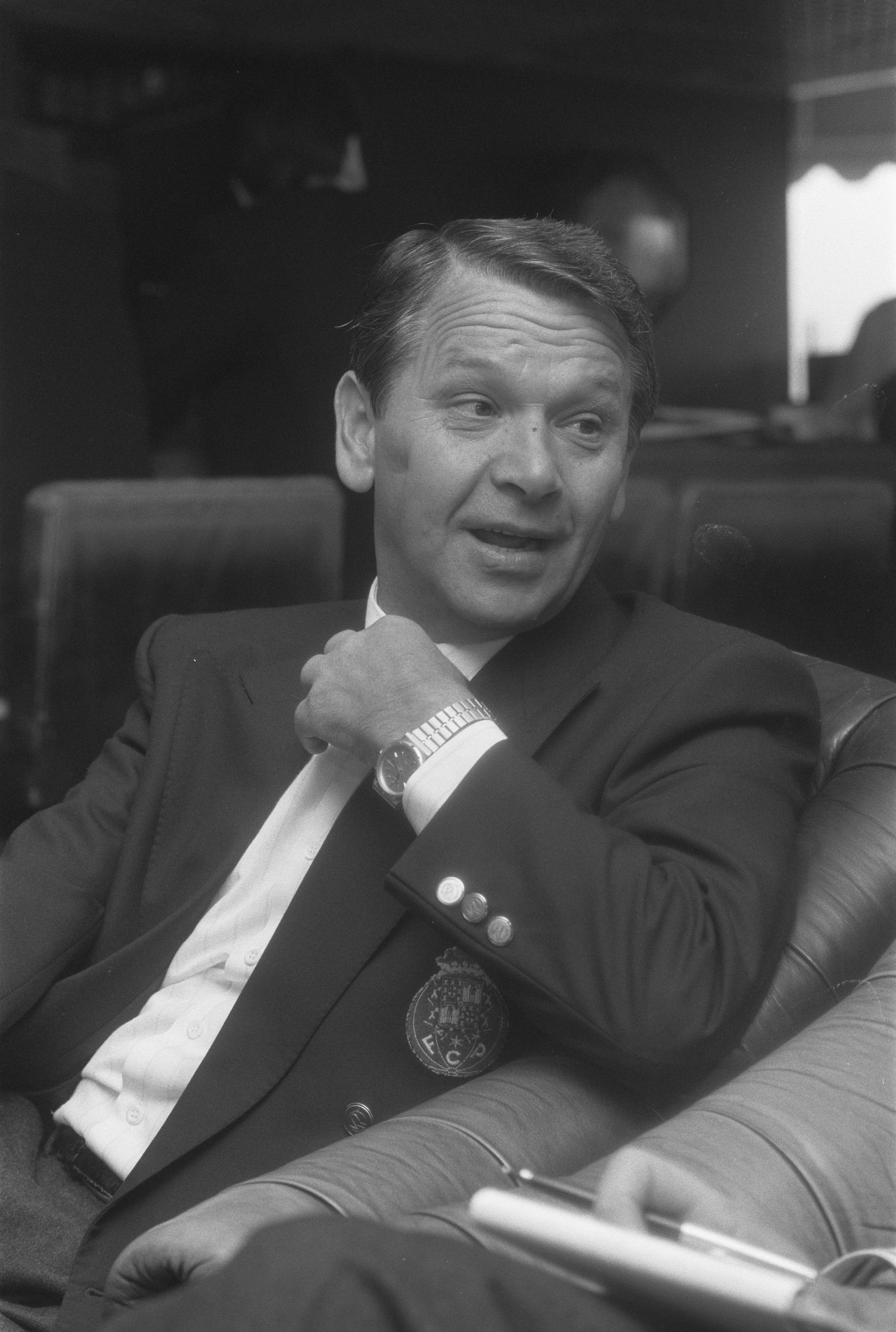
Tomislav Ivić won a record four titles in the 1987–88 season, including two international trophies.

In the summer of 1976, Porto brought back Pedroto, who had just won back-to-back Taça de Portugal titles with city rivals Boavista. He ended the club's eight-year trophy drought by winning his third consecutive cup final, played at Porto's stadium. The following season, Pedroto overcame Benfica on goal difference to bring the championship title back to Porto, 19 years after having played in the club's last league-winning squad. That season, Pedroto also took the team to the quarter-finals of a European competition for the first time, after eliminating Manchester United from the Cup Winners' Cup. Porto won the 1978–79 Primeira Divisão, defending the league title for the first time since 1939–40. They were on the verge of an unprecedented third successive league triumph, but compromising results in the last matches surrendered the title to Sporting CP. Defeat in the cup final for the second year running contributed to the increasing unrest between Porto's president Américo de Sá and the team staff, which culminated in the resignation of Pedroto and the director of football Jorge Nuno Pinto da Costa.

Austria's Hermann Stessl was the club's choice to succeed Pedroto; he lost the league and cup titles to Benfica in his first season, but defeated them in the first official edition of the domestic super cup, the Supertaça Cândido de Oliveira. On 23 April 1982, Pinto da Costa won the club's presidential election; one of his first decisions was to bring back Pedroto, who had been coaching Vitória de Guimarães. Despite his return, the club finished the 1982–83 season as runners-up to Benfica in the league and cup final. The latter result, however, allowed Porto to participate in the following season's Cup Winners' Cup, in which they reached their first-ever European final, losing 2–1 to Juventus. For this match, the team was led by assistant coach António Morais, who had been replacing a disease-stricken Pedroto since December 1983.

For the 1984–85 season, the club entrusted the head coach position to Artur Jorge, a former club player whose coaching career began as Pedroto's assistant in Guimarães. His first season was almost perfect, as he guided the team to their eighth league and third Supertaça titles, failing only against Benfica in the cup final. A second consecutive championship title in 1985–86 earned Artur Jorge's team an entry to the 1986–87 European Cup. Porto reached the tournament final, coming from behind to inflict European heavyweights Bayern Munich a surprising 2–1 defeat and lift their first international trophy. Artur Jorge left the club soon after this victory; to his place came Tomislav Ivić, a coach with club titles in Yugoslavia, the Netherlands, Belgium and Greece. Under Ivić, Porto achieved their second double and completed their international success by winning the European Super Cup and Intercontinental Cup.

=== 1988–2002: Penta architects and engineers ===
Like Artur Jorge, Ivić moved to France after guiding Porto through a successful season. His successor, Quinito, did not share the same fortune, resigning after eighteen matches, with six draws in eleven league matches and having lost the Supertaça. Porto brought back Artur Jorge but he could not salvage the season, which ended without a trophy for the first time in Pinto da Costa's presidency. In the two seasons that followed, Artur Jorge won his third league title with Porto, one Taça de Portugal and one Supertaça. His substitute, Brazilian coach Carlos Alberto Silva, held the job for two full seasons, during which the club secured back-to-back championships and one Supertaça, as well as the qualification for the first edition of the rebranded UEFA Champions League. Ivić returned five years after his first passage, but he could not emulate his previous success and was dismissed during the 1993–94 season winter break.

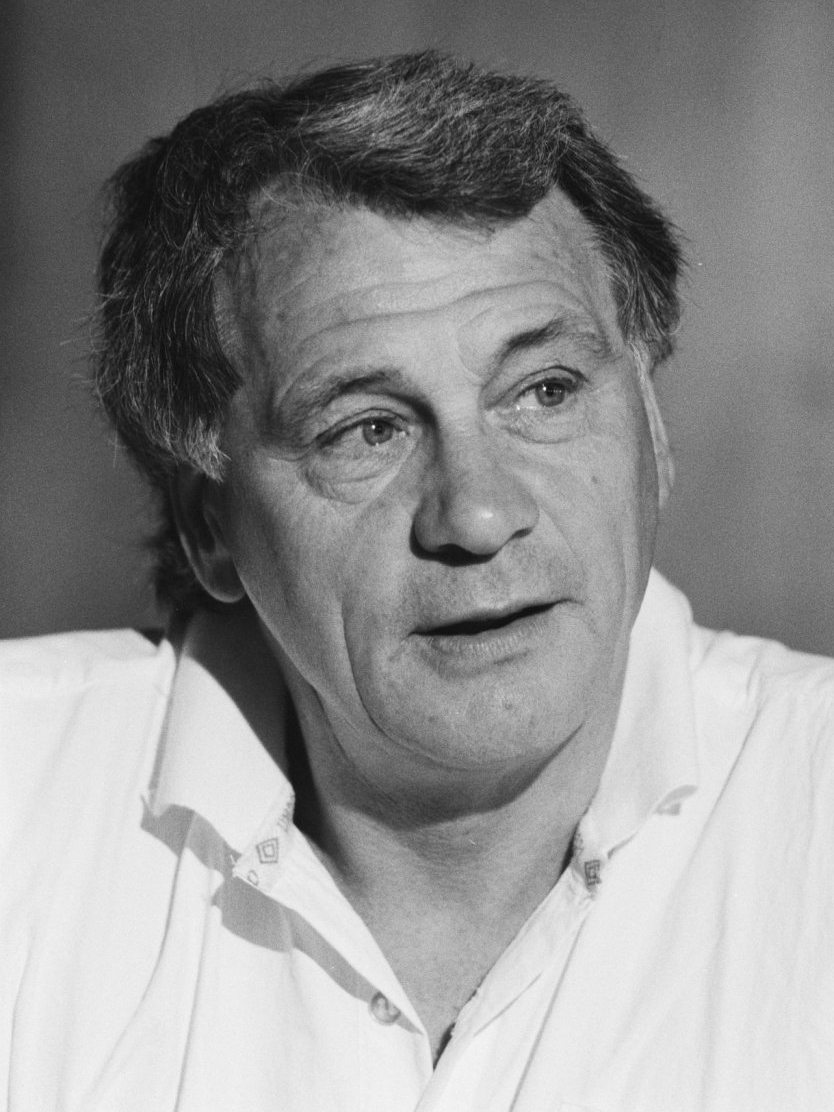
Sir Bobby Robson won the first two in a series of five consecutive league titles for Porto, from 1994 to 1996.

Porto invited Bobby Robson, who had been sacked by league leaders Sporting CP. Under his leadership, Porto shortened the gap to the top of the league table, won the Taça de Portugal, and reached the Champions League semi-finals. In each of the following two seasons, the team won the league and the Supertaça (both times against Benfica), raising the tally of wins over this opponent in the latter competition to seven out of eight meetings. During his last season in Porto, health problems forced Robson to fail many matches. During his absence, he was replaced by assistant coach and former Porto player, Augusto Inácio.

António Oliveira, a team captain in the late 1970s, was the club's choice to succeed Robson, who had left for Barcelona. Before signing for Porto, Oliveira had coached the Portugal national football team for two years, taking it to the UEFA Euro 1996 quarter-finals. Despite a bumpy start, Oliveira led Porto through a series of positive results that allowed the club to celebrate an unprecedented third consecutive league title. Meanwhile, the team lifted their ninth Supertaça after a historic 5–0 away win over Benfica. In the 1996–97 UEFA Champions League, Oliveira took the team to the quarter-finals, after winning their group ahead of Milan, whom they beat 3–2 at San Siro. The team's domestic performance was kept high during Oliveira's second season, as Porto secured their fourth straight league title and achieved a third double after beating Braga in the cup final.

Two days later, Oliveira resigned and his place was entrusted to Fernando Santos. He became known as the Engenheiro do Penta ("Penta Engineer") in reference to his engineering degree and for leading Porto to their fifth successive league title (Penta-campeonato or just Penta, in Portuguese), an unparalleled achievement in Portuguese football. In the following season, Santos lost the club's sixth straight league to Sporting CP, but defeated them in the cup final. In 2000–01, his last season in Porto, Santos defended the Taça de Portugal title, but failed to win the league for the second year running. He was succeeded by Octávio Machado, a former club player who had been Artur Jorge's assistant coach. Machado started off with a Supertaça win, but that would be Porto's only honour in a lackluster 2001–02 season, in which the team finished third in the league for the first time in 20 years. Machado was sacked after his team was eliminated from the Taça de Portugal and lost a league match for the sixth time.

=== 2002–06: Resurgence and life after Mourinho ===
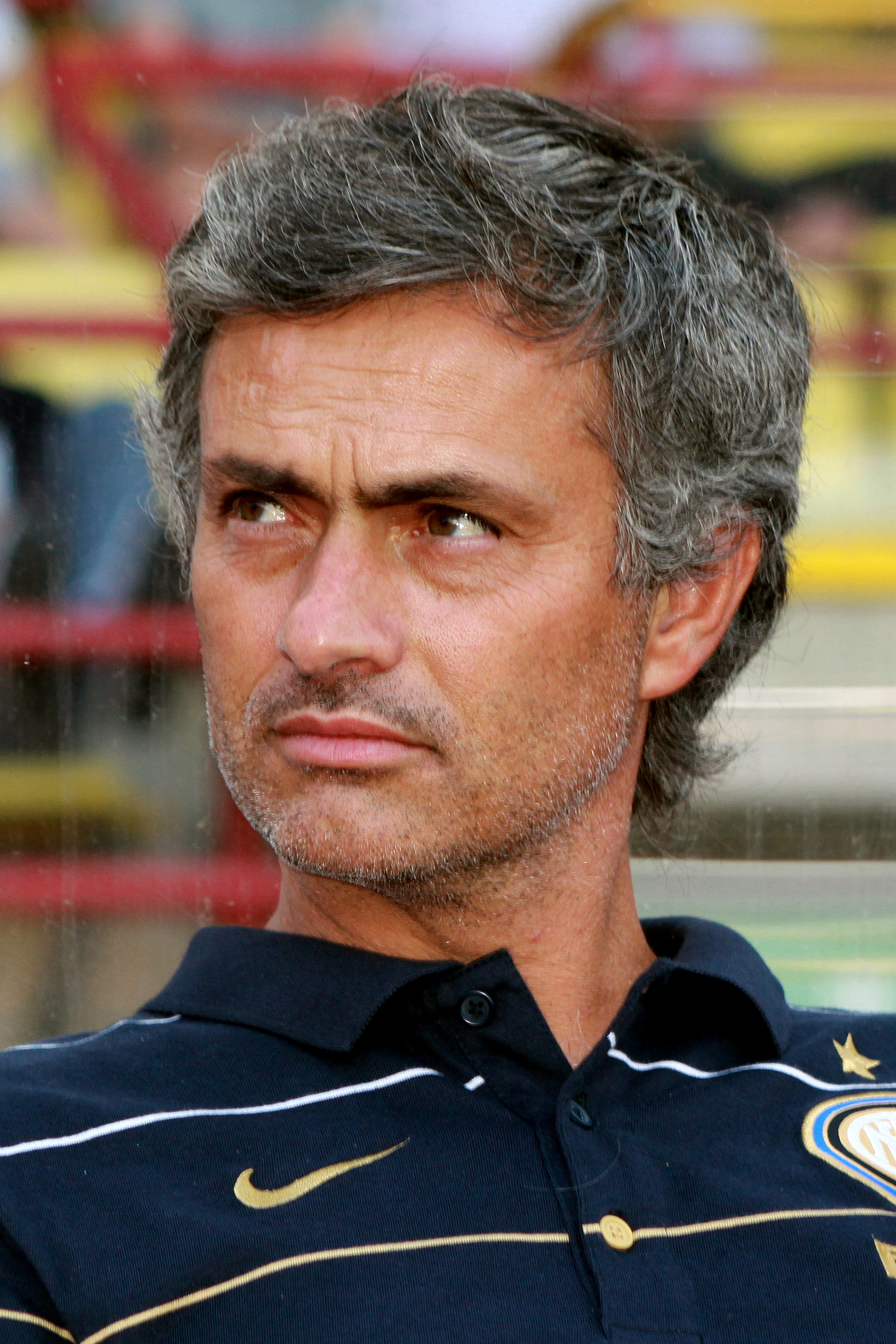
José Mourinho (pictured as Inter Milan coach in 2009) won the UEFA Cup and UEFA Champions League with Porto in back-to-back seasons.

In January 2002, Porto signed União de Leiria's coach José Mourinho, who returned to the club after his previous passage in Robson's staff. In his official presentation, Mourinho set the tone for the rest of his career in the club by stating that Porto would be crowned champions in the next season. Boosting new players mainly from other Portuguese clubs, the team fulfilled his promise by winning the 2002–03 Primeira Liga, eleven points ahead of runners-up Benfica. In Europe, Porto reached the 2003 UEFA Cup Final, where they beat Celtic 3–2 in extra-time to lift their first UEFA Cup trophy. As a result, Mourinho became the first Portuguese coach to win the Portuguese league and a European competition in the same season. Less than a month later, he guided the team to an unprecedented treble, after winning the Taça de Portugal final against his former club. Mourinho's next season was also toasted with success. Despite losing the 2003 UEFA Super Cup to Milan and the Taça de Portugal to Benfica, his team won the Supertaça and defended their Primeira Liga title. The season's highlight was, however, the surprising campaign in the 2003–04 UEFA Champions League, which culminated with a 3–0 victory over Monaco in the final. A week later, Mourinho left the European champions and headed for London to sign with Chelsea.

The newfound European success struck a hard blow on the club's ambitions, as the departure of Mourinho and most of the team's influential players was not adequately compensated. In an atypical 2004–05 season, Porto had three coaches. Italian coach Luigi Delneri never led the team in an official match, as he was sacked before the start of the season. Víctor Fernández, a Cup Winners' Cup victor in 1995, commanded Porto to victories in the Supertaça and 2004 Intercontinental Cup, but lost the 2004 UEFA Super Cup and was eliminated early from the Taça de Portugal. After a home loss in the league, the Spaniard was sacked and José Couceiro was given the position until the end of the season.

Dutchman Co Adriaanse was brought in for the 2005–06 season with the goal of taking back the league title, in Benfica's possession. Adriaanse accomplished not only this objective – employing a daring 3–4–3 formation during most of the season – but also secured the club's 13th Taça de Portugal title and fifth double. In contrast, the team performed poorly in the Champions League, failing to advance from the group stage and being eliminated altogether from European competitions. During the 2006–07 pre-season, Adriaanse resigned; his position was temporarily assumed by his assistant and home-grown club legend, Rui Barros. His only official match as caretaker coach coincided with the season-opening Supertaça, which Porto won for the 15th time.

=== 2006–11: Ferreira and Villas-Boas years ===
Adriaanse's successor, Jesualdo Ferreira, took advantage of the tactical work implemented by the Dutchman and led Porto to a second successive league title, decided by a single point in a frantic final matchday. Ferreira won the Primeira Liga in the following two seasons, becoming the first Portuguese coach to win three consecutive Portuguese championships. In the latter season, Ferreira lost the Supertaça and access to the 2008–09 Taça da Liga final, but his team went on to lift the Taça de Portugal, securing Porto's sixth double. In Europe, after two seasons of being eliminated in the first knockout round, Ferreira took Porto to the 2008–09 Champions League quarter-finals, where they lost against holders Manchester United. The Portuguese coach opened the 2009–10 season with his first Supertaça triumph and closed it by defending the Taça de Portugal title against relegated second-tier Chaves. In between, he failed to secure the club's second Penta – finishing third, outside the Champions League qualifying places – and lost the Taça da Liga final. In his last European campaign with Porto, Ferreira guided the team to the last 16 for the fourth year running, but they were eliminated by Arsenal after a 5–0 loss in London.

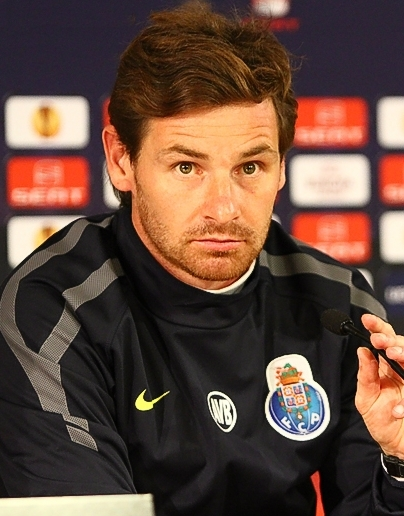
André Villas-Boas won four trophies in one season with Porto, including the UEFA Europa League.

On 26 May 2010, Ferreira resigned; a week later, Porto announced Académica de Coimbra's coach André Villas-Boas as his successor. Villas-Boas had previously worked with Mourinho in Porto, Chelsea and Inter Milan, before leaving him in 2009 to begin a coaching career in Académica de Coimbra. In his first match with Porto, his team faced Benfica for the Supertaça; Porto won 2–0 and Villas-Boas claimed his first career title, becoming the youngest coach to win a Portuguese competition. In the league, he led a team spearheaded by players such as Radamel Falcao and Hulk through a highly successful campaign that assured the title with five matches to spare, after beating defending champions Benfica at their ground. Under Villas-Boas, Porto finished the league season undefeated (27 wins and 3 draws) for the first time in its history. In addition, he broke other club records: distance between league winners and runners-up (21 points (Note: In a three-point-per-win system, introduced in Portuguese football in the 1995–96 season.)), most consecutive league wins (16) and highest percentage of points in a 30-game season (93.33%).

That season, Porto returned to UEFA's second club competition, renamed UEFA Europa League, eight years after their triumph in Seville. Starting in the play-off round, Villas-Boas's team reached the decisive match in Dublin, where they won the club's seventh international title in an all-Portuguese face-off against Braga. In doing so, Villas-Boas became the youngest coach to win a European club competition. The club's third consecutive triumph in the Taça de Portugal raised Villas-Boas's season trophy tally to four – matching Ivić's 1987–88 season – and allowed Porto to surpass Benfica in total number of titles (69 versus 68). Only Porto's early exit from the 2010–11 Taça da Liga prevented a complete domestic title sweep. Villas-Boas's short but highly prized career in Porto sparked the interest of Chelsea, who paid a record £13.3 million to release him from his contract with Porto and sign him as their new coach.

=== Recent years ===
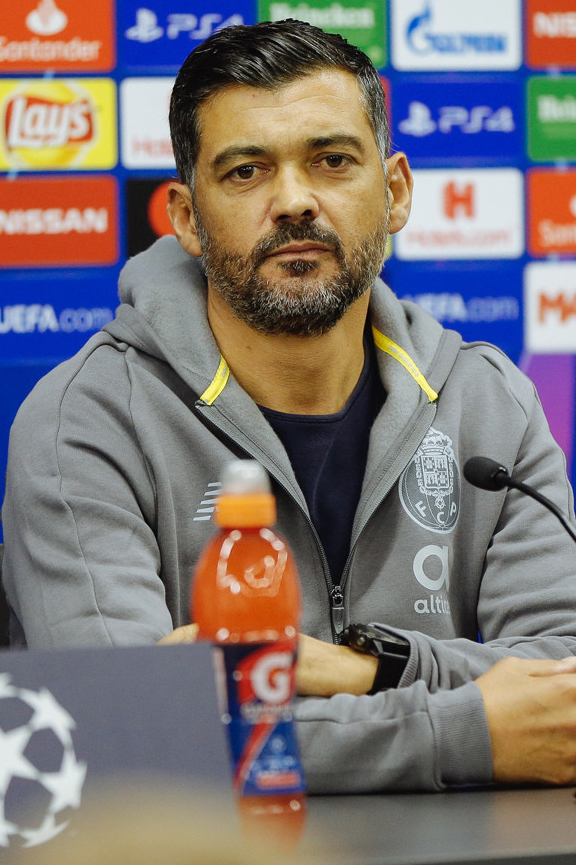
Sérgio Conceição ended a five-year trophy drought for Porto

Porto found in Villas-Boas' assistant Vitor Pereira their new head coach. Although getting off to a winning start, by taking the 2011 Supertaça Cândido de Oliveira, Pereira's Porto disappointed in most of the other competitions. In the Champions League group stage, the team finished third and was relegated to the Europa League. Able to defend their title, Porto fell immediately in the first round against Manchester City. Domestically, they were eliminated from the Taça de Portugal in the round of 32, and lost in the league cup semifinals. Inconsistent performances throughout the season threatened Porto's title defence, but positive results against direct opponents allowed the club to win the 2011–12 Primeira Liga with two games to spare.

Pereira won a second consecutive league and supercup in 2012–13, then left for Al-Ahli in Saudi Arabia. He was succeeded by Paulo Fonseca, who had just taken F.C. Paços de Ferreira into the Champions League for the first time. Fonseca began his reign with victory in the 2013 Supertaça Cândido de Oliveira but was sacked in March 2014 after a poor run of results; reserve manager Luís Castro served as interim manager until the end of the season.

In May 2014, Spain under-21 coach Julen Lopetegui was hired as Porto's first foreign manager since 2006. After 18 trophyless months in charge, he became just the eighth coach in their history to be dismissed during a season, with the team lying in third. Reserve manager Rui Barros filled the gap before the appointment of José Peseiro, who left in May 2016 to be replaced by former Porto goalkeeper Nuno Espírito Santo. He did not win an honour during his one season at the club, and left by mutual accord.

Another former Porto player, Sérgio Conceição, was hired in June 2017. His team won the 2017–18 Primeira Liga, the club's first honour for five years. He set the record for most games as manager of Porto, winning eleven honours including three league titles and the double in 2019–20 and 2021–22.

== Managers ==
- Only first-team competitive matches are counted. Wins, losses and draws are results at the final whistle; the results of penalty shoot-outs are not counted.
- Statistics are updated as of 4 November 2026.

Key

- P = matches played; W = matches won; D = matches drawn; L = matches lost; GF = goals for; GA = goals against; Win % = percentage of total matches won
- ‡ = Player-coach; † = Caretaker manager
- n/a = information not available

FC Porto coaches, their statistics and honours won
Name	Nationality	From	To	P	W	D	L	GF	GA	Win%	Honours	Notes
Catullo Gadda^{‡}	Italy	1906	1907	n/a	n/a	n/a	n/a	n/a	n/a	n/a		
Adolphe Cassaigne	France	1907	1922	30	23	3	4	119	35	76.67	1 Campeonato de Portugal; 7 Campeonato do Porto	(Note: Statistics since 1913, the year the first regional championship of Porto was held.)
Akös Teszler	Hungary	1922	1927	42	28	7	7	146	60	66.67	1 Campeonato de Portugal; 5 Campeonato do Porto	
Alexandre Cal^{‡}	Portugal	1927	1928	11	10	0	1	53	14	90.91	1 Campeonato do Porto	
József Szabó	Hungary	November 1928	February 1936	128	100	15	13	612	139	78.13	1 Campeonato de Portugal; 1 Primeira Liga; 8 Campeonato do Porto	
Mihály Siska	Hungary	February 1936	March 1936	2	1	0	1	5	2	50.00		
Ferenc Magyar	Hungary	March 1936	July 1936	14	9	3	2	52	13	64.29		
François Gutkas	Austria	October 1936	October 1937	31	21	2	8	116	49	67.74	1 Campeonato de Portugal; 1 Campeonato do Porto	
Mihály Siska	Hungary	October 1937	June 1942	153	112	19	22	753	242	73.20	2 Primeira Divisão; 3 Campeonato do Porto	
Lippo Hertzka	Hungary	June 1942	May 1945	93	54	14	25	123	32	58.06	3 Campeonato do Porto	
József Szabó	Hungary	May 1945	15 August 1947	71	41	9	21	263	122	57.75	2 Campeonato do Porto	
Carlos Nunes^{†}	Portugal	15 August 1947	5 October 1947	0	0	0	0	0	0	—		(Note: Carlos Nunes coached the team in just four matches, all of them during the pre-season.)
Eladio Vaschetto	Argentina	5 October 1947	13 June 1948	28	18	2	8	82	43	64.29		
Alejandro Scopelli	Argentina	August 1948	1 May 1949	29	18	1	10	61	40	62.07		
Augusto Silva	Portugal	9 October 1949	19 March 1950	22	10	2	10	53	44	45.45		
Francisco Reboredo	Argentina	16 April 1950	7 May 1950	4	2	0	2	8	8	50.00		
António Vogel	Romania	17 September 1950	26 November 1950	11	5	3	3	24	13	45.45		
Dezső Gencsy	Hungary	26 November 1950	17 June 1951	19	12	2	5	55	21	63.16		
Eladio Vaschetto	Argentina	September 1951	16 December 1951	13	10	2	1	39	14	76.92		
Luis Pasarín	Spain	6 January 1952	10 June 1952	20	9	5	6	51	31	45.00		
Lino Taioli	Argentina	August 1952	January 1953	11	6	2	3	19	15	54.55		
Cândido de Oliveira	Portugal	January 1953	13 June 1954	51	29	9	13	138	70	56.86		
Fernando Vaz	Portugal	August 1954	15 May 1955	28	13	6	9	56	37	46.43		
Dorival Yustrich	Brazil	August 1955	June 1956	31	23	7	1	100	23	74.19	1 Primeira Divisão; 1 Taça de Portugal	
Flávio Costa	Brazil	August 1956	May 1957	32	20	4	8	100	32	62.50		
Dorival Yustrich	Brazil	2 August 1957	23 March 1958	26	21	1	4	64	25	80.77		
Otto Bumbel	Brazil	March 1958	26 October 1958	16	9	5	2	44	19	56.25	1 Taça de Portugal	
Béla Guttmann	Hungary	2 November 1958	19 July 1959	28	21	4	3	108	20	75.00	1 Primeira Divisão	
Ettore Puricelli	Italy	August 1959	2 November 1959	9	2	1	6	11	18	22.22		
Ferdinand Daučík	Czechoslovakia	15 November 1959	24 April 1960	23	15	4	4	61	23	65.22		
Francisco Reboredo	Argentina	15 May 1960	June 1960	2	1	0	1	4	2	50.00		
Otto Vieira	Brazil	June 1960	5 March 1961	26	13	7	6	48	23	50.00		
Francisco Reboredo	Argentina	12 March 1961	9 July 1961	15	11	0	4	51	22	73.33		
György Orth	Hungary	August 1961	11 January 1962	14	9	3	2	32	12	64.29		
Francisco Reboredo	Argentina	11 January 1962	June 1962	18	13	3	2	45	14	72.22		
Jenő Kalmár	Hungary	September 1962	10 November 1963	43	30	6	7	111	40	69.77		
Otto Glória	Brazil	17 November 1963	9 May 1965	61	38	13	10	118	62	62.30		
Flávio Costa	Brazil	August 1965	3 April 1966	29	17	7	5	47	23	58.62		
Virgílio Mendes^{†}	Portugal	10 April 1966	2 May 1966	5	2	0	3	3	7	40.00		
José Maria Pedroto	Portugal	August 1966	9 April 1969	102	62	23	17	208	101	60.78	1 Taça de Portugal	
António Morais^{†}	Portugal	9 April 1969	27 April 1969	2	1	1	0	1	0	50.00		
Elek Schwartz	Romania	August 1969	12 December 1969	11	4	3	4	18	17	36.36		
Vieirinha^{†}	Portugal	21 December 1969	8 February 1970	7	3	1	3	7	7	42.86		(Note: An assistant coach of Elek Schwartz, Vieirinha replaced the Romanian who dealt with health problems.)
Tommy Docherty	Scotland	15 February 1970	3 May 1971	35	17	7	11	51	37	48.57		
António Teixeira	Portugal	3 May 1971	31 October 1971	14	5	4	5	25	17	35.71		
Artur Baeta^{†}	Portugal	31 October 1971	15 November 1971	1	1	0	0	4	0	100.00		
Paulo Amaral	Brazil	15 November 1971	March 1972	14	5	6	3	22	13	35.71		
António Feliciano	Portugal	March 1972	June 1972	12	7	0	5	24	16	58.33		
Fernando Riera	Chile	August 1972	June 1973	39	20	7	12	71	38	51.28		
Béla Guttmann	Hungary	August 1973	June 1974	34	21	7	6	55	26	61.76		
Aymoré Moreira	Brazil	August 1974	March 1975	27	15	4	8	48	31	55.56		
Monteiro da Costa	Portugal	March 1975	May 1975	11	7	3	1	31	12	63.64		
Branko Stanković	Yugoslavia	August 1975	January 1976	24	12	6	6	60	26	50.00		
Monteiro da Costa	Portugal	January 1976	June 1976	15	10	2	3	37	14	66.67		
José Maria Pedroto	Portugal	July 1976	12 July 1980	161	110	30	21	372	116	68.32	2 Primeira Divisão; 1 Taça de Portugal	
Hermann Stessl	Austria	12 July 1980	May 1982	84	53	18	13	141	53	63.10	1 Supertaça Cândido de Oliveira	
José Maria Pedroto	Portugal	July 1982	8 December 1983	57	42	7	8	135	32	73.68		
António Morais	Portugal	8 December 1983	16 May 1984	33	22	8	3	71	17	66.67	1 Taça de Portugal; 1 Supertaça Cândido de Oliveira	(Note: Morais replaced Pedroto in six matches during the 1982–83 season and for most of the 1983–84 season, due to health problems. Eventually, Pedroto stepped down and Morais became head coach.)
Artur Jorge	Portugal	July 1984	May 1987	130	96	18	16	297	80	73.85	2 Primeira Divisão; 2 Supertaça Cândido de Oliveira; 1 European Cup	
Tomislav Ivić	Yugoslavia	July 1987	June 1988	54	40	11	3	115	24	74.07	1 Primeira Divisão; 1 Taça de Portugal; 1 European Super Cup; 1 Intercontinental Cup	
Quinito	Portugal	July 1988	30 October 1988	16	6	7	3	13	13	37.50		
Alfredo Murça^{†}	Portugal	30 October 1988	November 1988	3	3	0	0	5	0	100.00		
Artur Jorge	Portugal	November 1988	June 1991	125	91	21	13	255	71	72.80	1 Primeira Divisão; 1 Taça de Portugal; 1 Supertaça Cândido de Oliveira	
Carlos Alberto Silva	Brazil	August 1991	June 1993	96	61	21	14	165	54	63.54	2 Primeira Divisão; 1 Supertaça Cândido de Oliveira	
Tomislav Ivić	Croatia	August 1993	30 January 1994	27	15	8	4	41	19	55.56		
Bobby Robson	England	30 January 1994	13 July 1996	112	77	23	12	232	64	68.75	2 Primeira Divisão; 1 Taça de Portugal; 2 Supertaça Cândido de Oliveira	
Augusto Inácio^{†}	Portugal	6 August 1995	28 October 1995	13	9	4	0	23	4	69.23		(Note: In the beginning of the 1995–96 season, assistance coach Inácio replaced Robson, who was dealing with health problems.)
António Oliveira	Portugal	13 July 1996	26 May 1998	97	70	12	15	219	95	72.16	2 Primeira Divisão; 1 Taça de Portugal; 1 Supertaça Cândido de Oliveira	
Fernando Santos	Portugal	26 May 1998	13 June 2001	156	98	31	27	310	126	62.82	1 Primeira Divisão; 2 Taça de Portugal; 2 Supertaça Cândido de Oliveira	
Octávio Machado	Portugal	13 June 2001	21 January 2002	35	18	6	11	55	34	51.43	1 Supertaça Cândido de Oliveira	
José Mourinho	Portugal	23 January 2002	1 June 2004	127	91	21	15	254	96	71.65	2 Primeira Liga; 1 Taça de Portugal; 1 Supertaça Cândido de Oliveira; 1 UEFA Champions League; 1 UEFA Cup	
Luigi Delneri	Italy	4 June 2004	9 August 2004	0	0	0	0	0	0	—		
Víctor Fernández	Spain	11 August 2004	1 February 2005	29	12	10	7	31	23	41.38	1 Supertaça Cândido de Oliveira; 1 Intercontinental Cup	
José Couceiro	Portugal	1 February 2005	22 May 2005	17	8	5	4	17	17	47.06		
Co Adriaanse	Netherlands	1 July 2005	9 August 2006	45	29	10	6	69	28	64.44	1 Primeira Liga; 1 Taça de Portugal	
Rui Barros^{†}	Portugal	9 August 2006	20 August 2006	1	1	0	0	3	0	100.00	1 Supertaça Cândido de Oliveira	
Jesualdo Ferreira	Portugal	20 August 2006	26 May 2010	186	125	30	31	354	138	67.20	3 Primeira Liga; 2 Taça de Portugal; 1 Supertaça Cândido de Oliveira	
André Villas-Boas	Portugal	3 June 2010	21 June 2011	58	49	5	4	145	42	84.48	1 Primeira Liga; 1 Taça de Portugal; 1 Supertaça Cândido de Oliveira; 1 UEFA Europa League	
Vítor Pereira	Portugal	21 June 2011	9 June 2013	93	65	16	12	190	67	69.89	2 Primeira Liga; 2 Supertaça Cândido de Oliveira	
Paulo Fonseca	Portugal	10 June 2013	5 March 2014	37	21	9	7	69	31	56.76	1 Supertaça Cândido de Oliveira	
Luís Castro^{†}	Portugal	5 March 2014	10 May 2014	16	9	2	5	25	18	56.25		
Julen Lopetegui	Spain	10 May 2014	8 January 2016	78	53	16	9	159	54	67.95		
Rui Barros^{†}	Portugal	8 January 2016	21 January 2016	4	2	0	2	6	2	50.00		
José Peseiro	Portugal	21 January 2016	30 May 2016	22	13	1	8	38	26	59.09		
Nuno Espírito Santo	Portugal	1 June 2016	22 May 2017	49	27	16	6	88	28	55.10		
Sérgio Conceição	Portugal	8 June 2017	4 June 2024	379	274	53	52	812	314	72.30	3 Primeira Liga; 4 Taça de Portugal; 1 Taça da Liga; 3 Supertaça Cândido de Oliveira	
Vítor Bruno	Portugal	6 June 2024	20 January 2025	29	18	3	8	63	30	62.07	1 Supertaça Cândido de Oliveira	
José Tavares^{†}	Portugal	20 January 2025	27 January 2025	2	0	1	1	1	2	0.00		
Martín Anselmi	Argentina	27 January 2025	1 July 2025	21	10	6	5	32	25	47.62		
Francesco Farioli	Italy	6 July 2025		69	52	8	9	130	44	75.36	1 Primeira Liga; 1 Supertaça Cândido de Oliveira	

== Statistics ==
=== By honours ===
List of FC Porto managers by honours
Rank	Manager	Regional	National	International	Total
1	(Hungary) József Szabó	10	2	0	12
2	(Portugal) Sérgio Conceição	0	11	0	11
3	(Portugal) Artur Jorge	0	7	1	8
3	(France) Adolphe Cassaigne	7	1	0	8
5	(Portugal) José Mourinho	0	4	2	6
5	(Hungary) Akös Teszler	5	1	0	6
7	(England) Bobby Robson	0	5	0	5
7	(Portugal) Fernando Santos	0	5	0	5
7	(Hungary) Mihály Siska	3	2	0	5
10	(Socialist Federal Republic of Yugoslavia) (Croatia) Tomislav Ivić	0	2	2	4
10	(Portugal) André Villas-Boas	0	3	1	4
10	(Portugal) José Maria Pedroto	0	4	0	4
10	(Portugal) António Oliveira	0	4	0	4
10	(Portugal) Vítor Pereira	0	4	0	4
15	(Brazil) Carlos Alberto Silva	0	3	0	3
15	(Hungary) Lippo Hertzka	3	0	0	3
17	(Spain) Víctor Fernández	0	1	1	2
17	(Brazil) Dorival Yustrich	0	2	0	2
17	(Portugal) António Morais	0	2	0	2
17	(Netherlands) Co Adriaanse	0	2	0	2
17	(Italy) Francesco Farioli	0	2	0	2
17	(Austria) François Gutkas	1	1	0	2
23	(Brazil) Otto Bumbel	0	1	0	1
23	(Hungary) Béla Guttmann	0	1	0	1
23	(Austria) Hermann Stessl	0	1	0	1
23	(Portugal) Octávio Machado	0	1	0	1
23	(Portugal) Paulo Fonseca	0	1	0	1
23	(Portugal) Rui Barros	0	1	0	1
23	(Portugal) Alexandre Cal	1	0	0	1
23	(Portugal) Vítor Bruno	0	1	0	1

=== By nationality ===
List of FC Porto managers by nationality
Rank	Nationality	Number of managers
1	Portugal	32
2	Hungary	9
3	Brazil	8
4	Argentina	4
4	Italy	4
5	Spain	3
7	Austria	2
7	Romania	2
7	Yugoslavia	2 (Note: Tomislav Ivić had Yugoslav nationality during his first spell at the club (1987–88), but was a Croatian national in his return in 1993–94.)
10	Chile	1
10	Croatia	1
10	Czechoslovakia	1
10	England	1
10	France	1
10	Netherlands	1
10	Scotland	1
Total	16	72
