= Apito Dourado =

Football corruption scandal in Portugal

The Apito Dourado (English: Golden Whistle) affair is a sports corruption scandal in Portuguese football that first arose in 2004. Portuguese Judiciary Police (Polícia Judiciária) investigators named several football personalities as suspects (arguidos) of corrupting or attempting to corrupt referees, including late Jorge Nuno Pinto da Costa, chairman of FC Porto (until 2024), and the former Boavista F.C. chairman and Portuguese League for Professional Football President Valentim Loureiro. Although less notorious, a major part of the affair involved lower division referees and clubs, namely UD Sousense and Gondomar S.C., and club officials.

In December 2006, Pinto da Costa's former partner Carolina Salgado published the book Eu, Carolina ("Me, Carolina"), in which she made serious accusations against him. Pinto da Costa called these accusations "absurd" and said he would address them in court. Salgado's book caused the two cases in which Pinto da Costa was involved that had already been dismissed to be re-opened.

In March 2008, Porto's Tribunal de Instrução Criminal decided that one of these cases, concerning a match between FC Porto and Beira-Mar where Pinto da Costa delivered an envelope containing €2,500 to a referee, would proceed to trial. The other major case involving FC Porto and Pinto da Costa, regarding a match between FC Porto and Estrela da Amadora, where FC Porto offered prostitutes to the match referees, was dismissed for the second time in June 2008 and the main accusation witness, Salgado, accused of perjury.

In July 2008, Valentim Loureiro was found guilty of abuse of power but not guilty of corruption. He was sentenced to three years and two months of suspended jail time.

In May 2008, the disciplinary committee of the Portuguese Professional Football League, who had opened a parallel non-criminal proceeding called Apito Final (Final Whistle), sentenced Pinto da Costa to a two-year suspension and FC Porto was docked six points in the Primeira Liga and fined €150,000 for attempted bribery; Boavista FC was sentenced to relegation for bribery and referee coercion, and fined €180,000; União de Leiria lost three points and its chairman, João Bartolomeu, was sentenced to a one-year suspension. FC Porto recovered those points in July 2017.

In January and October 2010, many of the Apito Dourado wiretaps were uploaded to YouTube.

== Chronology ==
On 20 April 2004, the Apito Dourado operation was triggered, leading to the arrest of 16 people, including club officials and referees. Among them were the then Portuguese League for Professional Football President and Mayor of Gondomar, Valentim Loureiro, the then Chairman of the Refereeing Board, José António Pinto de Sousa, and the then chairman of Gondomar S.C., José Luís Oliveira.

On 2 December, the Judiciary Police was supposed to conduct a search at Pinto da Costa's home, but the Chairman of FC Porto had been previously informed by a source in the Judiciary Police, clearing the site beforehand. On the next day, Pinto da Costa presented himself willingly in the Court of Gondomar for questioning, and was released on a 200,000 euro bail.

On 20 April 2005, the "fruit affair", named as such because of the "fruit" (a codeword for prostitutes) which was used in tapped phone calls, involving FC Porto's chairman Pinto da Costa offering prostitutes to referee Jacinto Paixão before the match between FC Porto and Estrela da Amadora, was dropped.

In January 2006, the Apito Dourado affair proceeded in Gondomar, and the public prosecution filed charges against 27 people, including Valentim Loureiro, José Oliveira and Pinto de Sousa.

By December, Carolina Salgado, former partner of Pinto da Costa, published the book Eu, Carolina ("Me, Carolina"), in which she revealed new data about the case, mainly sports corruption situations, tax fraud, breach of judicial secrecy, assaults, perjury and obstruction to justice. This caused the court to reopen several court cases.

The court cases related to the FC Porto - Estrela da Amadora and Beira-Mar - FC Porto were reopened in early 2007. The first match involved FC Porto offering prostitutes to Jacinto Paixão (the referee); the second match involved Pinto da Costa delivering Augusto Duarte (the referee) an envelope containing 2,500 euro in order for him to benefit FC Porto. The affair became known as the "envelope affair".

In March 2007, the judiciary team responsible for the Apito Dourado affair announced that 56 inquiries were underway. In July, judge Maria José Morgado revealed that 20 charges were produced.

In March 2008, FC Porto was indicted for the corruption cases in the matches against Beira-Mar and Estrela da Amadora. For the same reason, Nacional and Boavista were also indicted for bribering the referees of the matches against Benfica and Marítimo, and the match against Estrela da Amadora, respectively.

In October 2008, the court filed the case against Pinto da Costa, Augusto Duarte, Rui Alves and António Araújo regarding the Nacional - Benfica match.

In March, the public prosecution asked for the conviction of Pinto da Costa, António Araújo and Augusto Duarte regarding the FC Porto - Beira-Mar match.

== Criminal court decisions ==
In June 2007, 13 of the 24 suspects in the Gondomar part of the affair, mainly related to lower division football, were convicted of charges comprising corruption, influence peddling and abuse of power. Valentim Loureiro was sentenced to three years and two months of suspended penalty for abuse of power, and lost his position of mayor of Gondomar. José Luís Oliveira, chairman of Gondomar SC and vice-chairman of the city of Gondomar was found guilty of 25 crimes of abuse of power and 10 crimes of corruption, and was sentenced to three years of suspended penalty. Pinto de Sousa was found guilty of 25 crimes of abuse of power and convicted to three years of suspended penalty.

João Macedo, António Eustáquio, Jorge Saramago (all three of them referees) were sentenced to pay a fine. The court considered proven that all three of them had received gold objects but that did not mean that the referees had breached the rules of the game of football association. It also stated that it was impossible to prove in which situation of a match the referee was acting intentionally in case of error.

Barbosa da Cunha, João Soares Mesquita, Ricardo Pinto, Carlos Carvalho, Valente Mendes, José Manuel Rodrigues, Sérgio Sedas, José Agostinho Silva and Leonel Viana were all acquitted by the Gondomar court.

On 3 April 2009, Pinto da Costa was acquitted on all criminal charges related to the Beira-Mar-FC Porto match of the 2003–04 season.

== Apito Final ==
In 2007, the Portuguese League of Football started a non-criminal process calling it Apito Final (Final Whistle). On 9 May 2008, Boavista were relegated to the second-tier Liga de Honra for bribery and referee coercion and FC Porto were docked six points for attempted bribery. This caused UEFA's Control and Disciplinary Body to ban FC Porto from the 2008–09 UEFA Champions League. This decision was later annulled by UEFA's Appeals Body, meaning FC Porto was admitted to the competition. The Portuguese League has also sentenced Pinto da Costa to a two-year suspension; João Loureiro, Boavista's chairman and Valentim Loureiro's son, to a four-year suspension; and João Bartolomeu, União de Leiria chairman, to a one-year suspension. Five referees have also been suspended. All the clubs, chairmen, and referees punished filed appeals, except for FC Porto, whose punishment did not prevent them from winning the Portuguese League title.

In May 2011, the Central Administrative Court of the South of Portugal ruled that the decision of taking six points from FC Porto's global classification in the 2007–08 season, as well as the suspension of FC Porto's president, Jorge Nuno Pinto da Costa for two years, both confirmed in 2008 on a controversial meeting made by the Justice Council of the Portuguese Football Federation, were to be ruled as "inexistent", due to the fact that those decisions were taken by a small number of the remaining counselors, after the meeting had been declared finished by the council's president, and acting behind the President's and the Vice-president's back, as they were absent by then. The Portuguese Football Federation has announced it would appeal from this decision to the Administrative Supreme Court.

Pinto da Costa was acquitted of corruption in relation to the match between FC Porto and Estrela da Amadora 2003–04 on 23 September 2014. The Justice Council (FPF) president acquitted the FC Porto president of "the practice of infringement disciplinary very serious corruption (...) in the form of trial."

Also Jacinto Paixão, at the date first category referee, was acquitted of the practice of "very serious disciplinary infraction of corruption of the refereeing team", along with the remaining technical team: José Carlos Gladim Chilrito and Manuel António Candeias Square.

The Disciplinary Commission of the League, now the professional section of the Disciplinary Council of the Portuguese Football Federation, ignored the wiretaps as evidence.

== Wiretaps ==
Several conversations between suspects were recorded during the Apito Dourado investigation, and many of them show talks about referee nominations and performances and briberies. After the acquittal decisions, several wiretaps were released on YouTube and immediately went viral. Some of the most notorious ones include:

- A conversation (hours before the FC Porto-Estrela da Amadora match on 24 January 2004) between FC Porto's chairman, Pinto da Costa, and football agent António Araújo, in which Araújo asks for Pinto da Costa's authorization to send "fruit to sleep with" (a codeword for prostitutes) to JP (codename for Jacinto Paixão, the match referee). Pinto da Costa states in that conversation that "fruit" has already been sent. Four years later, a video recording emerged that showed a confession by Jacinto Paixão, in which he confesses to the usual practice of accepting prostitutes and paid trips to either benefit FC Porto (against Académica) or harm Benfica (against Moreirense). Jacinto Paixão states in the video that he recorded such confession in case something should happen to him or his family.
- Conversations between Pinto da Costa, António Araújo and Augusto Duarte (a referee), where the three arrange a meeting at Pinto da Costa's house. This took place two days before Augusto Duarte was refereeing the match between FC Porto and Beira-Mar. Pinto da Costa stated that this visit was due to the fact that the referee Augusto Duarte was seeking family advice from him. That the meeting had taken place was proven in court; however, the motive for it was not clear, so the charge was dismissed.
- A conversation between Belenenses president, Sequeira Nunes, and Pinto de Sousa, chairman of the Refereeing Board, which took place on 24 March 2004, where the former denounces to the latter that Nacional's president, Rui Alves, is offering prostitutes to Nacional's matches' referees in order to benefit Nacional. A month prior to that conversation, Rui Alves complains to António Araújo that Nacional has not won a match refereed by Augusto Duarte for a long time. Araújo then asks for Rui Alve's permission to "work" the referee in order to benefit Nacional against Benfica. Three days later, Araújo phones Alves to inform him that everything was in place. Nacional won the match against Benfica (3–2).

== Aftermath ==
The Apito Dourado process was a major event in Portuguese football and made international headlines at the time. Pinto da Costa, the most notorious suspect, was not convicted by the criminal court system, although being convicted by the Portuguese League's disciplinary committee to a two-year ban. FC Porto was convicted by the league's disciplinary committee to a six-point loss and ordered to pay a €150,000 fine.

Despite no heavy convictions of penalties, the scandal seriously damaged Portuguese football's and FC Porto's reputation. Santiago Segurola, Marca's assistant director stated in 2008, "It is terrible what is happening to football (...) In the last few years proven corruption cases have emerged from Italy and Portugal (...) There are people who want to win so much that they are willing to break the rules in the most obscene ways. One of the things that surprises the most is that they (the teams involved) are always the same: Juventus, Porto..."

The Apito Dourado scandal not only hit Portuguese football but also the whole Portuguese criminal procedure system. One of the big controversies was that the prosecutors had "no doubts" about the Judiciary Police tipping off Pinto da Costa to clear his office hours before the conduction of a search. However, since the source of the leak was unable to be identified, the accusation was dismissed. The court decision which convicted lower division referees to fines has been subject of controversies. One of them is the justification it gave for not considering golden object offers to referees as relevant evidence. A wide debate has also been sparked between the right to privacy (invoked in this case as part of a claim that the unauthorized wiretaps were unusable evidence) and the demand for a more severe justice, regardless of the privacy rights of crime suspects.

The codewords used in the wiretaps have since become common Portuguese football jargon, expressions such as "fruta para dormir" ("fruit to sleep with", a codeword for prostitutes), "dark coffee" and "latte" (referring to the skin tone of the prostitutes), "rebuçado" (literally translated as "candy") being used by both supporters and club officials to mock and attack clubs related to the Apito Dourado wiretaps, such as FC Porto, Boavista FC, CD Nacional and Gondomar SC.

CMTV started a series about Apito Dourado in 2013, regarding the 10th anniversary of the scandal, by airing the already known wiretaps as well as releasing previously unknown ones.
