= Vítor Murta =

Vítor Murta may refer to:

- Vítor Murta (executive) (1975/1976–2026), Portuguese sports executive, president of Boavista F.C.
- Vítor Murta (footballer) (born 1979), Portuguese footballer
