= List of FC Porto presidents =

Futebol Clube do Porto is a Portuguese sports club based in Porto that is best known for its professional association football team competing in the country's top-tier division, the Primeira Liga. The club was founded on 28 September 1893 by António Nicolau de Almeida, its first president, and since then has had a total of 31 distinct presidents, some of which have held office in multiple occasions.

As of 7 May 2024, the current and 32nd president is former club manager André Villas-Boas. He succeeded Jorge Nuno Pinto da Costa, the club's longest-serving chairman, in office for 42 consecutive years since 1982.

== List of presidents ==
No.	Name	From	To	Football honours
1	António Nicolau de Almeida	28 September 1893	1896	
2	José Monteiro da Costa	2 August 1906	30 January 1911	
3	Júlio Garcez de Lencastre	16 March 1911	21 September 1911	
4	Guilherme do Carmo Pacheco	21 September 1911	8 June 1912	
5	Joaquim Pereira da Silva	8 June 1912	15 June 1914	
6	António Borges d'Avelar	15 June 1914	27 June 1916	2 Campeonato do Porto
7	António Martins Ribeiro	27 June 1916	24 July 1917	1 Campeonato do Porto
8	Henrique Mesquita	24 July 1917	31 August 1919	2 Campeonato do Porto
9	António Pinto de Faria	31 August 1919	1922	2 Campeonato do Porto
10	Eurico Brites	1922	1923	1 Campeonato de Portugal; 1 Campeonato do Porto
11	Sebastião Ferreira Mendes	1923	1923	
12	Domingos Almeida Soares	1923	1926	1 Campeonato de Portugal; 3 Campeonato do Porto
13	Afonso Freire Themudo	1926	2 September 1927	1 Campeonato do Porto
–	Sebastião Ferreira Mendes	2 September 1927	March 1928	1 Campeonato do Porto
14	Urgel Horta	March 1928	August 1929	1 Campeonato do Porto
15	Augusto Sequeira	August 1929	8 March 1930	1 Campeonato do Porto
16	Eduardo Dumont Villares	8 March 1930	1931	1 Campeonato do Porto
17	António Augusto Figueiredo e Melo	1931	1932	1 Campeonato de Portugal; 1 Campeonato do Porto
–	Sebastião Ferreira Mendes	1932	12 September 1934	2 Campeonato do Porto
–	Eduardo Dumont Villares	12 September 1934	September 1936	1 Primeira Liga; 2 Campeonato do Porto
18	Carlos Teixeira Costa Júnior	September 1936	September 1938	1 Campeonato de Portugal; 1 Campeonato do Porto
19	Ângelo César Machado	September 1938	July 1940	2 Primeira Divisão; 2 Campeonato do Porto
20	Augusto Pires de Lima	July 1940	September 1941	1 Campeonato do Porto
21	José Sousa Barcellos	September 1941	September 1943	1 Campeonato do Porto
22	Luis Ferreira Alves	September 1943	19 January 1945	2 Campeonato do Porto
23	Cesário Bonito	19 January 1945	May 1948	2 Campeonato do Porto
24	Júlio Ribeiro Campos	May 1948	May 1949	
25	Miguel Pereira	May 1949	26 March 1950	
–	Júlio Ribeiro Campos	26 March 1950	27 July 1951	
–	Urgel Horta	27 July 1951	1954	
26	José Carvalho Moreira de Sousa	1954	1955	
–	Cesário Bonito	1955	1957	1 Primeira Divisão; 1 Taça de Portugal
27	Paulo Pombo	1957	1959	1 Primeira Divisão; 1 Taça de Portugal
–	Luís Ferreira Alves	1959	1961	
28	José Maria Nascimento Cordeiro	1961	1965	
–	Cesário Bonito	1965	1967	
29	Afonso Pinto de Magalhães	3 May 1967	1972	1 Taça de Portugal
30	Américo Gomes de Sá	7 February 1972	23 April 1982	2 Primeira Divisão; 1 Taça de Portugal; 1 Supertaça Cândido de Oliveira
31	Jorge Nuno Pinto da Costa	23 April 1982	7 May 2024	23 Primeira Divisão/Primeira Liga; 15 Taça de Portugal; 1 Taça da Liga; 22 Supertaça Cândido de Oliveira; 2 European Cup/UEFA Champions League; 2 UEFA Cup/UEFA Europa League; 1 European/UEFA Super Cup; 2 Intercontinental Cup
32	André Villas-Boas	7 May 2024	Present	1 Primeira Liga; 1 Taça de Portugal; 2 Supertaça Cândido de Oliveira
