= Pinto da Costa =

Pinto da Costa may refer to:

- Jorge Nuno Pinto da Costa (1937–2025), Portuguese sports executive, chairman of FC Porto
- Manuel Pinto da Costa, twice president of São Tomé and Príncipe
