= Corrupção =

- Directed by: João Botelho
- Written by: João Botelho
- Based on: Eu, Carolina by Carolina Salgado
- Starring: Nicolau Breyner; Margarida Vila-Nova; António Pedro Cerdeira; Alexandra Lencastre; Rita Blanco
- Release date: 1 November 2007 (Portugal)
- Running time: 90 minutes
- Country: Portugal
- Language: Portuguese

Corrupção (Corruption) is a 2007 Portuguese film directed by João Botelho, starring Nicolau Breyner and Margarida Vila-Nova. Based on Carolina Salgado's book Eu, Carolina (I, Carolina), it was the second highest-grossing Portuguese film in 2007.

== Cast ==
- Nicolau Breyner as President
- Margarida Vila-Nova as Sofia
- António Pedro Cerdeira as Inspector Luís
- Alexandra Lencastre as Sofia's mother
- André Gomes as President's lawyer
- Carlos Costa as bar's boss
- Dinarte Branco as doctor
- Filipe Vargas as Polícia Judiciária agent
- João Cabral as editor 2
- João Lagarto as Figueira
- João Ricardo as businessman
- José Eduardo as Admiral
- José Raposo as Polícia Judiciária Inspector
- Luís Soveral as beaten deputy
- Miguel Guilherme as President of referees
- Miguel Monteiro as Polícia Judiciária Director
- Paula Guedes as Zulmira
- Paulo Filipe as journalist's friend
- Rita Blanco as General's wife
- Rui Morrison as attorney
- Ruy de Carvalho as President Judge
- Suzana Borges as magistrate
- Virgílio Castelo as Vice-president

== See also ==
- Apito Dourado
