= Valentim Loureiro =

Portuguese politician and football chairman

Major Valentim Loureiro ComM
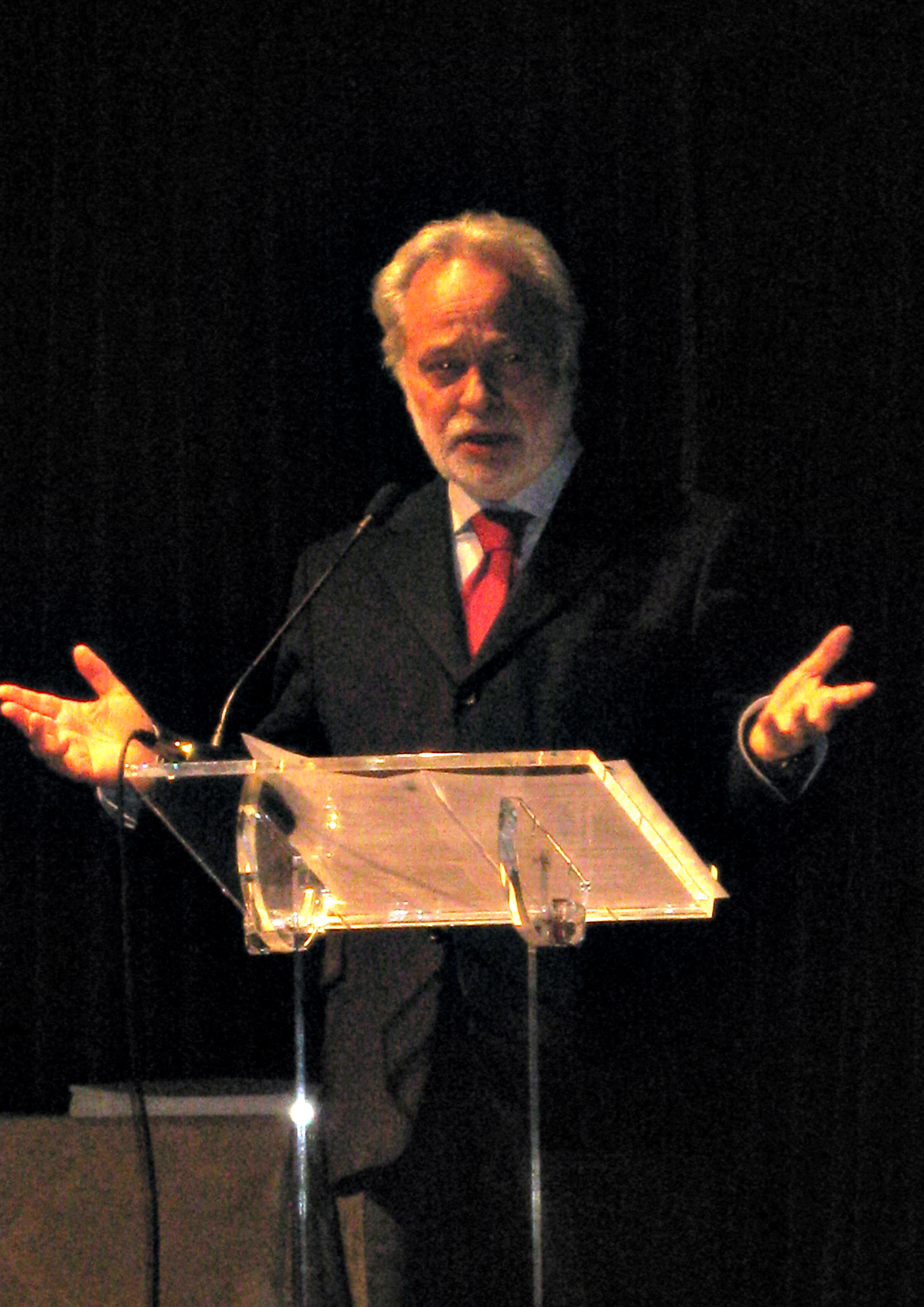
- Loureiro in 2009

Mayor of Gondomar
- In office 12 December 1993 – 23 October 2013
- Deputy: José Luís Oliveira
- Preceded by: Aníbal Lira
- Succeeded by: Marco Martins

Chairman of Porto Metro
- In office 2001–2005
- Preceded by: José Vieira de Carvalho
- Succeeded by: Manuel de Oliveira Marques

President of the Portuguese Professional Football League
- In office 23 December 1996 – 2 October 2006
- Preceded by: Pinto da Costa
- Succeeded by: Hermínio Loureiro
- In office 14 April 1989 – 28 October 1994
- Preceded by: João Aranha
- Succeeded by: Manuel Damásio

President of Boavista
- In office 1978–1997
- Preceded by: Eduardo Taveira da Mota
- Succeeded by: João Loureiro

Personal details
- Born: 24 December 1938 (age 87) Calde, Portugal
- Party: Independent
- Other political affiliations: Social Democratic Party (1974–2005)
- Education: Portuguese Military Academy
- Profession: Army officer businessman
- Awards: Commander of the Order of Merit

Military service
- Branch/service: Portuguese Army
- Years of service: 1959–1967
- Rank: Major
- Battles/wars: Colonial War

Valentim dos Santos de Loureiro ComM (born 24 December 1938 in Calde, Viseu) is a Portuguese politician and former football chairman of Boavista and Portuguese League for Professional Football. He has the rank of Major of the Portuguese Army. He was involved in the Apito Dourado sports scandal, for which he was sentenced by the Courts of Portugal.

He was mayor of Gondomar municipality in northern Portugal. He was elected as an independent, as well as for the PSD party. He was president of the Metropolitan Area of Porto. His successor as President of the Portuguese League for Professional Football and chairman of Boavista was his son João Loureiro who held the office from 1997 to 2007. He was also a consul of Guinea-Bissau in Porto, leader of the PSD party in the Porto district, and chairman in Porto Metro state-owned mass transit company. He is famous in Portugal for the multitude of offices he held at a time.

Valentim Loureiro briefly attended the Law School of the University of Coimbra before moving on to a military career.

== Apito Dourado scandal ==
Valentim Loureiro was investigated by the police and formally accused in the Apito Dourado scandal. In July 2008, he was found guilty of abuse of power, but not guilty of corruption and sentenced to three years and two months of suspended jail time. He was rehabilitated afterwards by the Superior Court of Portugal.
