= Carolina Salgado =

Portuguese public figure (born 1977)

Carolina Salgado (born 14 March 1977) is a Portuguese public figure best known for being a former partner of FC Porto's long-time chairman Jorge Nuno Pinto da Costa, and subsequently as a witness in Apito Dourado.

== Relationship with Pinto da Costa ==
Born in Vila Nova de Gaia, Salgado became known as Jorge Nuno Pinto da Costa's companion between 2000 and 2006, after he met her while she was working in a brothel, "Calor da Noite", as a part-time job. After the couple split, she published a controversial autobiography titled Eu, Carolina ("I, Carolina", officially ghost written by a long-time friend and high school Portuguese teacher Maria Fernanda Freitas de Sousa – although the latter claims there were substantial changes from the manuscript) in December 2006, presenting some quarters of Portuguese football as a promiscuous world, and revealing details of her relationship with Pinto da Costa. It was alleged by Salgado and widely reported in the news media that Pinto da Costa, who was formally accused in the Apito Dourado (Golden Whistle) sports corruption scandal in June 2007, was tipped off to the investigation by one of his personal friends inside the police department in Porto conducting the investigation, Polícia Judiciária. This resulted in Pinto da Costa leaving Portugal to Spain with Salgado, hours before the police raided his house, where they did not find the documents they were looking for. Other serious accusations were made by Salgado, including match fixing, the bribing of referees with prostitutes, and Pinto da Costa's alleged ordering of the beating of Gondomar municipality councilman Ricardo Bexiga by two people. In addition, Salgado claimed that she was assaulted by Pinto da Costa's driver, who allegedly kicked her sister's pregnant belly. According to Salgado's own words, 6 April 2006 was the saddest day of her life, as she was (allegedly) kicked and slapped by Pinto da Costa.

== Books ==
The book Eu, Carolina ("I, Carolina") made an impact on Portuguese news media and society. A film adaptation was made for cinema in 2007 with the title Corrupção ("Corruption"). The film was directed by João Botelho, starring Margarida Vila-Nova as the partner of a football club's chairman, portrayed by Nicolau Breyner.

In 2011, Salgado published another book, titled Descida ao Inferno ("Descent to Hell"), in which she describes her life as a "hell" since the end of her relationship with Pinto da Costa.

== Personal life ==
Carolina has a twin sister, Ana, and two children. In 2013, Salgado participated in the reality show Big Brother VIP.
