= Liga Portuguesa de Futebol Profissional =

Portuguese professional football league

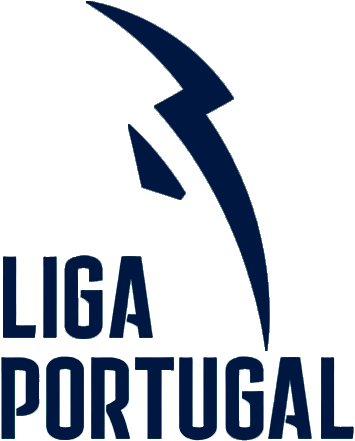
- Founded: 3 February 1978; 47 years ago
- Country: Portugal
- Confederation: UEFA
- Divisions: Primeira Liga; Liga Portugal 2
- Number of clubs: 36
- Level on pyramid: 1–2
- Relegation to: Liga 3
- Domestic cup: Taça de Portugal
- League cup: Taça da Liga
- Current champions: Sporting CP (2024–25)
- Website: www.ligaportugal.pt

The Liga Portugal (English: Portugal League), also known by its acronym LP, is a league that manages professional football club competitions in Portugal. It was founded in 1978 as Liga Portuguesa dos Clubes de Futebol Profissional and works as an autonomous entity under the authority of the Portuguese Football Federation. In 1991, it changed its name to Liga Portuguesa de Futebol Profissional and in the year 2020, rebranded as Liga Portugal.

The LP is responsible for the organisation and supervision of the top two leagues, Liga Portugal, Liga Portugal 2 and of the Taça da Liga, a knockout cup competition limited to the clubs competing in these professional leagues (except reserve or B teams).

The current president is Reinaldo Teixeira, who has been in office since 11 April 2025.

== List of presidents ==
1. João Aranha (1978–1980)
2. Lito Gomes de Almeida (1980–1989)
3. Valentim Loureiro (1989–1994)
4. Manuel Damásio interim (1994–1995)
5. Pinto da Costa (1995–1996)
6. Valentim Loureiro (1996–2006)
7. Hermínio Loureiro (2006–2010)
8. Fernando Gomes (2010–2011)
9. Mário Figueiredo (2012–2015)
10. Luís Duque (2014–2015)
11. Pedro Proença (2015–2025)
12. Reinaldo Teixeira (2025–present)

== See also ==
- LPFP Awards
- LPFP Primeira Liga Player of the Year
