= André Villas-Boas =

Portuguese football executive and manager (born 1977)

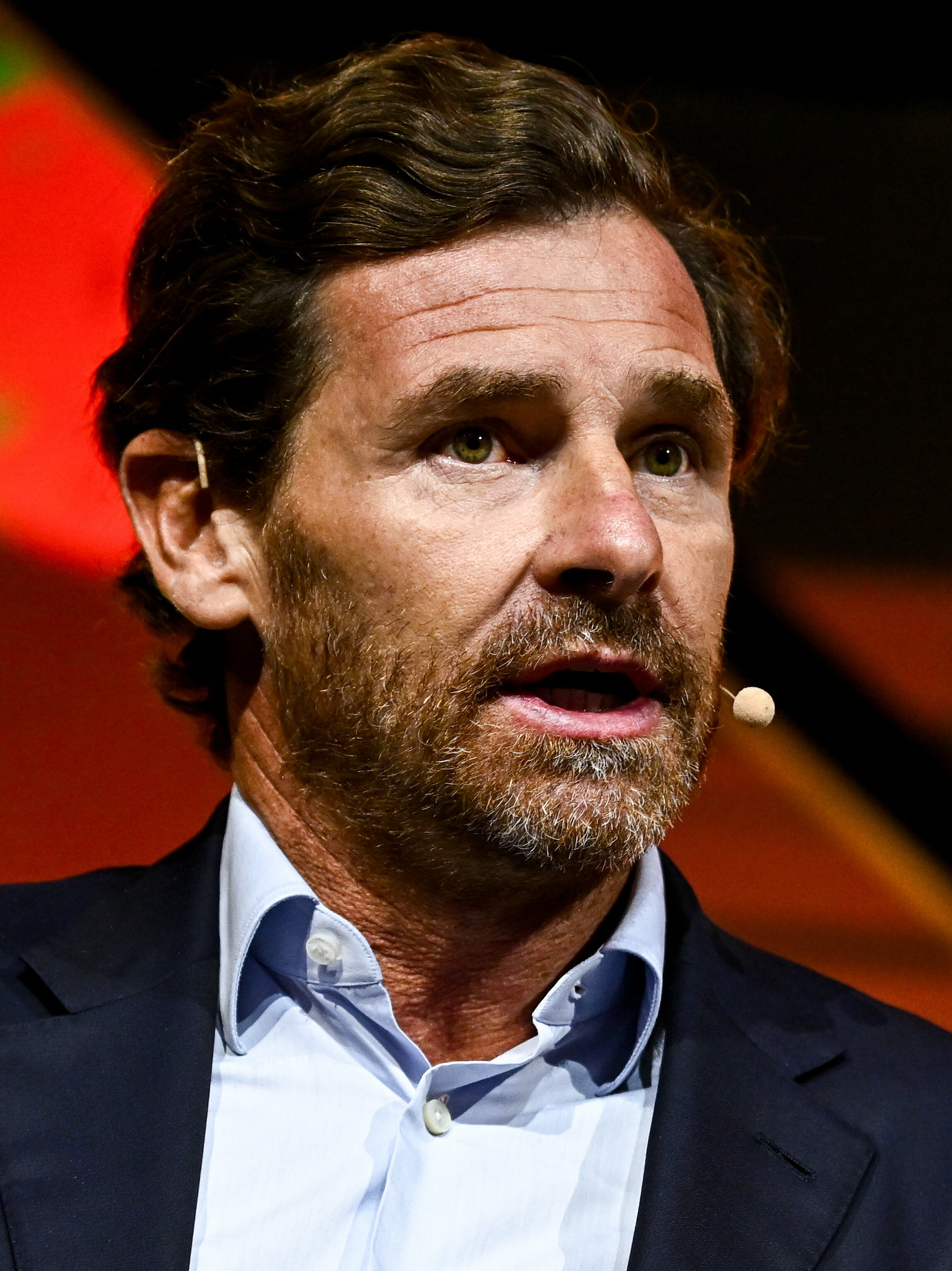
- Villas-Boas in 2023

32nd President of FC Porto
- Incumbent
- Assumed office 7 May 2024
- Preceded by: Jorge Nuno Pinto da Costa

Personal details
- Born: Luís André de Pina Cabral e Villas-Boas; 17 October 1977 (age 49) Porto, Portugal
- Height: 1.82 m (6 ft 0 in)
- Occupation: Football executive
Association football career
Managerial career
- Years: Team
- 2009–2010: Académica
- 2010–2011: Porto
- 2011–2012: Chelsea
- 2012–2013: Tottenham Hotspur
- 2014–2016: Zenit Saint Petersburg
- 2016–2017: Shanghai SIPG
- 2019–2021: Marseille

Luís André de Pina Cabral e Villas-Boas (Portuguese pronunciation: [luˈiz ɐ̃ˈdɾɛ ðɨ ˈpinɐ kɐˈβɾal i ˈvilɐʒ ˈβoɐʃ]; born 17 October 1977) is a Portuguese sports executive and former football manager, who is the president of Portuguese sports club Porto. He was among the growing number of top-level managers who never played football professionally, and one of the few managers to have never played beyond youth football.

His managerial career highlights include an undefeated 2010–11 season in the Primeira Liga with Porto, winning four trophies and becoming the youngest manager to win a European title in the process; guiding Tottenham Hotspur to a then-record tally of 72 points in the Premier League during the 2012–13 season (the most points by a team finishing outside the top four at the time); and three trophies during his spell with Zenit Saint Petersburg, including the club's fifth Russian Premier League title.

In January 2024, almost three years after his last managerial stint at Marseille, Villas-Boas announced his candidacy to the presidency of Porto. On 27 April 2024, he won the club elections with 80% of the votes, defeating incumbent president Jorge Nuno Pinto da Costa, who had been in office for 42 years.

== Early life and career ==
Born and raised in Porto, Portugal, Villas-Boas is the second child and first son of Luís Filipe Manuel Henrique do Vale Peixoto de Sousa e Villas-Boas (born 29 February 1952) and Teresa Maria de Pina Cabral e Silva (born 11 February 1951), and is also the great-grandson of Dom José Gerardo Coelho Vieira Pinto do Vale Peixoto de Vilas-Boas, 1st Viscount of Guilhomil. He has spoken fluent English since childhood, when he was taught it by his grandmother, who was from Stockport, England. At the age of 16, Villas-Boas found himself living in the same apartment block as Bobby Robson, who was then manager of Porto. Following a conversation between the two, Robson appointed him to Porto's observation department.

Robson arranged for Villas-Boas to obtain the FA coaching qualification, the UEFA C coaching licence in Scotland and for him to study the training methods of Ipswich Town. He obtained his C licence at the age of 17, and his B licence at 18. He received his A licence at the age of 19, and later acquired UEFA Pro Licence under the tutelage of Jim Fleeting. Villas-Boas had a short stint as technical director of the British Virgin Islands national team at the age of 21, before he moved on to a career as an assistant coach at Porto under José Mourinho. As Mourinho moved clubs to Chelsea and Internazionale, he followed.

== Coaching career ==
=== Académica ===
At the start of the 2009–10 season, Villas-Boas left Mourinho's team to pursue a career as a manager, and he soon found a job in the Primeira Liga with Académica de Coimbra, filling a vacancy created by Rogério Gonçalves' resignation in October 2009. At the time of his appointment, Académica was at the bottom of the league and still without any wins, but the team's luck started to change as he introduced a new style, leading them to a safe 11th place, ten points clear of the relegation zone. In addition to that, Académica also reached the 2009–10 Portuguese League Cup semi-finals, losing against Porto at the Estádio do Dragão to a late goal from Mariano González. His impact at Académica was immediate, not only because of solid results, but also because of the attractive football displayed by the team, which led to intense media speculation linking him with the vacant jobs at Sporting CP and Porto in the summer of 2010.

=== Porto ===
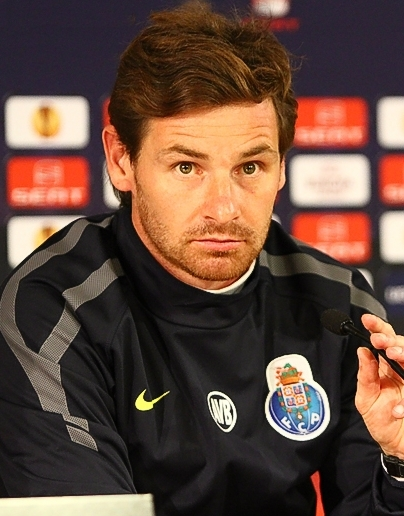
Villas-Boas as manager of Porto in 2011

Villas-Boas signed a deal to become the new manager of Porto on 2 June 2010. Two months later, he won his first trophy as a manager when Porto defeated Benfica 2–0 to win the Portuguese Supercup. Villas-Boas went on to immense success with Porto, leading the team to an undefeated season in the Primeira Liga—only the second time this had ever been achieved—and winning the title by more than 20 points, having conceded only 13 goals all season. Villas-Boas went on to follow up this success by leading Porto to win both the Portuguese Cup and the UEFA Europa League, thus completing a treble in his first season in charge. By doing so, Villas-Boas became the third-youngest coach ever to win the Primeira Liga (behind Mihály Siska in 1939 and Juca in 1962) and the youngest manager ever to win a European competition, at the age of 33 years and 213 days. On 21 June 2011, Villas-Boas tendered his resignation as Porto manager.

=== Chelsea ===
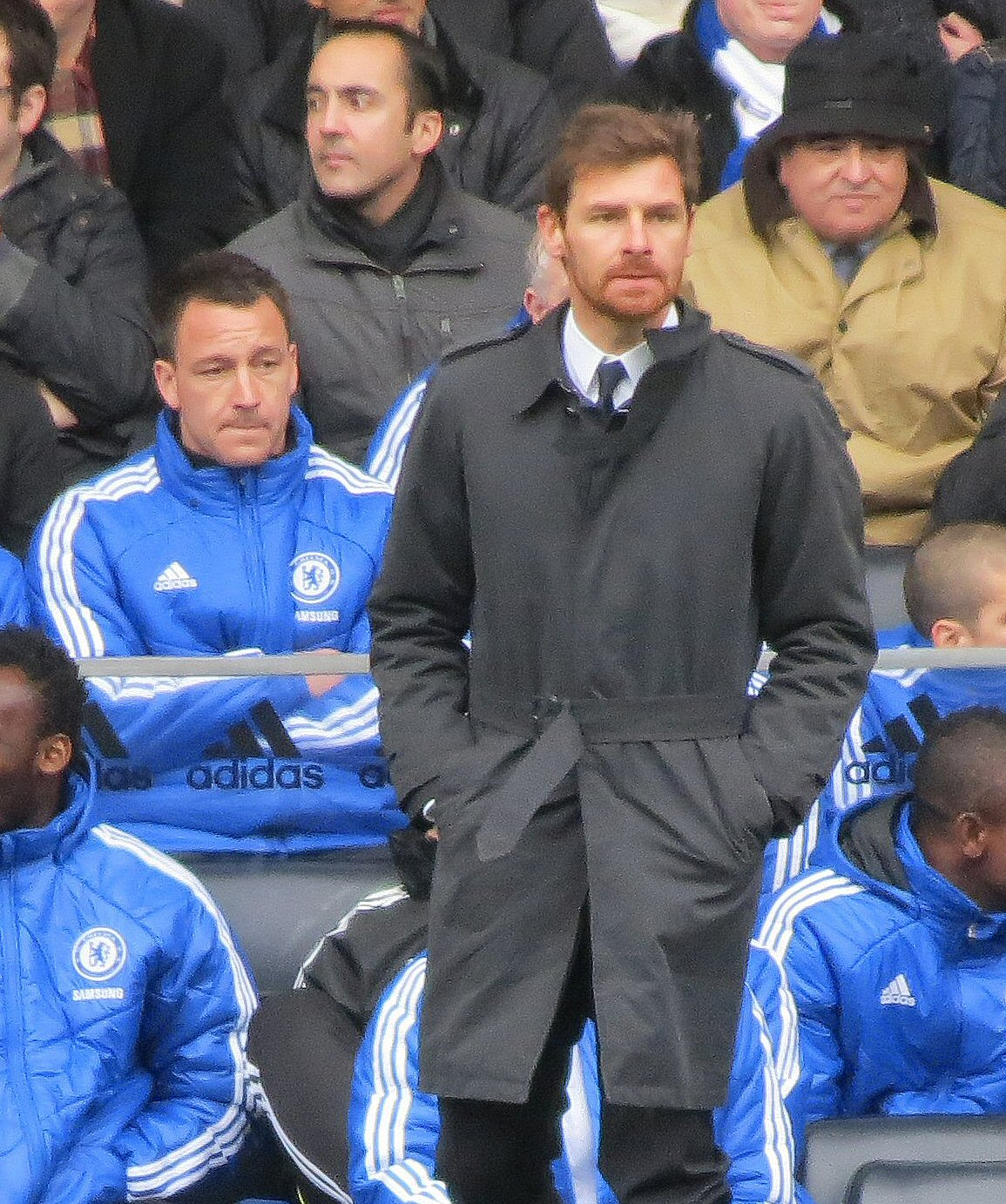
Villas-Boas managing Chelsea in 2012

Chelsea confirmed the appointment of André Villas-Boas as its new manager on a three-year contract with immediate effect on 22 June 2011. It indirectly paid Porto a world record €15 million (£13.3 million) compensation via Villas-Boas to activate his release clause and free him from his contract with Porto. He won all of his pre-season fixtures with Chelsea, the team conceding only one goal in all six games. On 14 August, his first Premier League match ended in a 0–0 draw at Stoke City, with Villas-Boas commenting on Stoke's strong defence at home. He then won his first competitive match as Chelsea manager, defeating West Bromwich Albion 2–1 on 20 August. He continued his season with a home win, beating Norwich City 3–1. On 18 September 2011, Villas-Boas's Chelsea lost to Manchester United 3–1 at Old Trafford. It was Chelsea's first defeat of the season and Villas-Boas's first defeat in 39 league matches, a run stretching back to his spells as manager of Académica and Porto. On 29 October, Chelsea lost the derby in a 5–3 defeat at home to Arsenal after falling to a 1–0 defeat to Queens Park Rangers. Then three weeks later, his Chelsea side lost a second successive home game in a 2–1 defeat to Liverpool. Days later, he once again lost to Liverpool in a 2–0 defeat in the League Cup quarter-final.

On 11 February 2012, pressure began to mount on Villas-Boas as Chelsea dropped out of the top four in the Premier League following a 2–0 league defeat against Everton. Villas-Boas responded by cancelling his squad's day off and called them in for an inquest, which provoked several senior players to question his tactics in front of owner Roman Abramovich. On 21 February 2012, during a Champions League match against Napoli, Villas-Boas left Frank Lampard, Michael Essien and Ashley Cole on the bench. Chelsea lost 3–1 and the club's technical director asked for an explanation of the team selection on behalf of Abramovich. On 4 March 2012, following a 1–0 league defeat against West Brom which left Chelsea three points adrift of Arsenal in the battle for fourth place in the Premier League, Villas-Boas was relieved of his managerial duties by Chelsea, with assistant manager Roberto Di Matteo being appointed as caretaker manager on an interim basis until the end of the season. On the Chelsea website, it read, "The board would like to record our gratitude for his work and express our disappointment that the relationship has ended so early."

=== Tottenham Hotspur ===
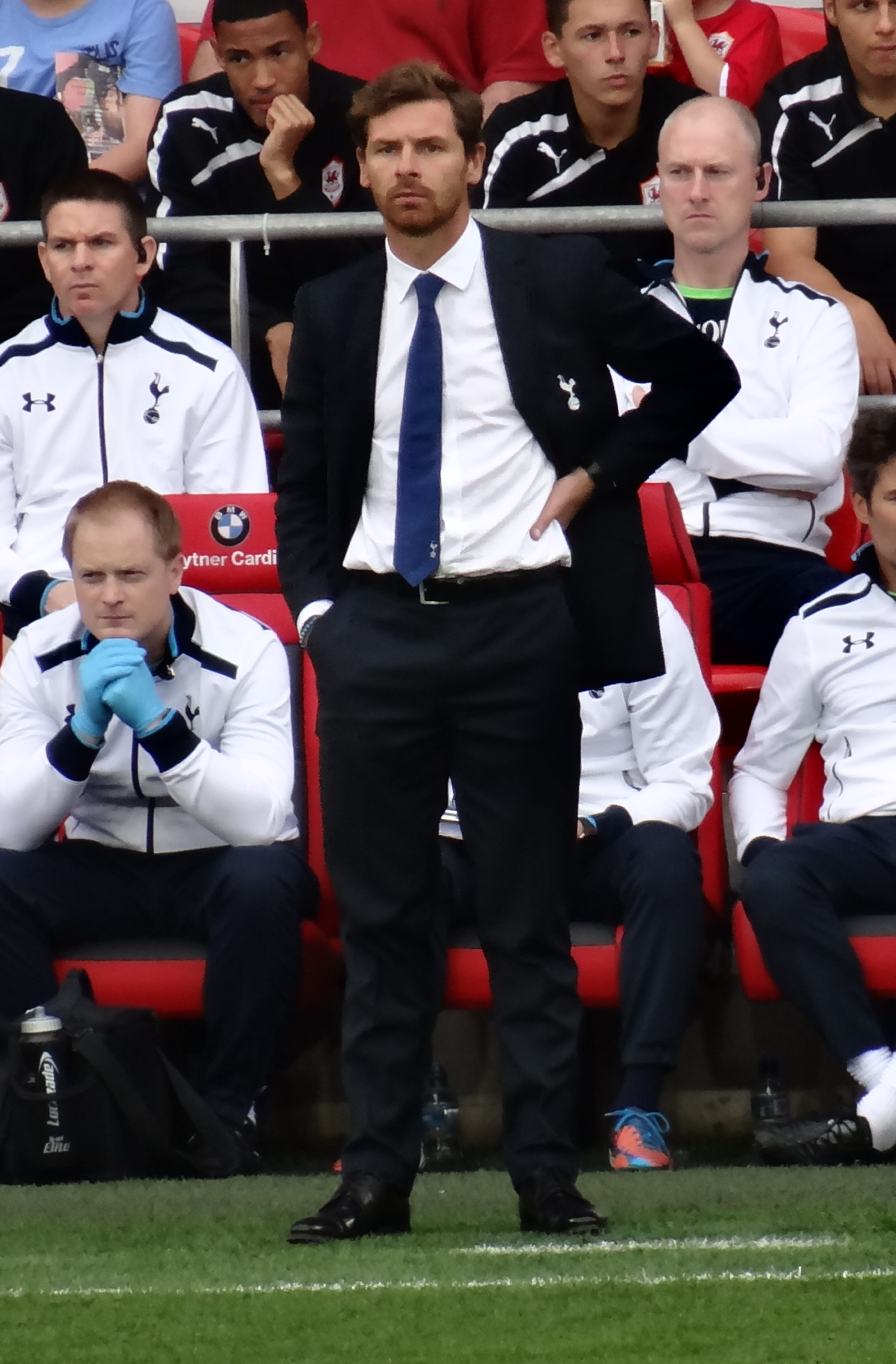
Villas-Boas managing Tottenham Hotspur in 2013

On 3 July 2012, it was announced that Villas-Boas had been named Tottenham Hotspur head coach after successful talks with the club, replacing Harry Redknapp and signing a three-year deal with the North London football team. Villas-Boas' first competitive game in charge of Tottenham came on 18 August 2012 in the opening day of the Premier League season, losing 2–1 to Newcastle United away from home. His first competitive win came on 16 September 2012, a 3–1 victory away to Reading.

On 29 September 2012, Villas-Boas became the first Tottenham manager to win at Old Trafford in 23 years after his side beat Manchester United 3–2. Villas-Boas took charge of his first North London derby against Arsenal on 17 November 2012 at the Emirates Stadium. Despite taking the lead early on, goalscorer Emmanuel Adebayor was sent off just eight minutes later, and Tottenham eventually lost 5–2. Villas-Boas earned his first piece of personal Tottenham silverware when he won the Manager of the Month award for December. The team managed to pick up vital points in order to pursue their top four ambition. Promising big scorelines away from home such as against Fulham, Aston Villa and Sunderland along with home wins against Swansea City and Reading, left Tottenham in third place going into the new year. One set back was a tough trip to Goodison Park, where Spurs were leading up until the 90th minute, before two late Everton goals in as many minutes, snatched victory away from the North London side.

In February 2013, Villas-Boas guided Tottenham to the last 16 of the Europa League after a last minute goal from Mousa Dembélé, securing a 1–1 draw against Lyon at the Stade Gerland. Spurs won the tie 3–2 on aggregate, after a 2–1 win at home the previous week. Following a 3–2 away win at West Ham United, Tottenham's third win from three Premier League matches that month, Villas-Boas picked up his second piece of personal Tottenham silverware of the season as he was awarded the Manager of the Month award for February, along with Gareth Bale who picked up the Player of the Month award for February as well.

On the final day of the Premier League season, Tottenham sat a point behind North London rivals, Arsenal, knowing that in order to qualify for the 2013–14 Champions League, they had to win and hope that Arsenal failed to win. Tottenham won against Sunderland, but did not qualify due to Arsenal's 0–1 win at Newcastle United. Even though Tottenham finished a point behind the Champions League playoff spot, they set a new club record by finishing with 72 points. This was also the highest points tally ever achieved by any club in the Premier League to consequently not finish in the top four, until Arsenal finishing in fifth with 75 points in 2016-17.

In the close season, Villas-Boas claimed he was approached by both Paris Saint-Germain and Real Madrid to fill their managerial vacancies but insisted he rejected these offers to remain with Spurs for a second successive season, something which he had not previously done as a manager. Following the sale of star player Gareth Bale to Real Madrid for a world record fee of £85.3 million, Villas-Boas was active in the transfer market before the start of the 2013–14 Premier League season. Key acquisitions included defensive midfielder Étienne Capoue, midfielder Paulinho, striker Roberto Soldado, the versatile Nacer Chadli, ball-playing defender Vlad Chiricheș, winger Erik Lamela and playmaker Christian Eriksen. Departures from the club included Tom Huddlestone, Clint Dempsey, Steven Caulker and Scott Parker.

On 16 December 2013, Tottenham announced that Villas-Boas had left the club "by mutual consent." The departure, with Spurs lying seventh in the Premier League and having won all six Europa League group games, followed a series of disappointing domestic league results that included a 6–0 defeat away to Manchester City and culminated in a 0–5 home defeat to Liverpool. Villas-Boas left the club with the highest percentage of league wins of any Tottenham manager in the club's Premier League era.

=== Zenit Saint Petersburg ===
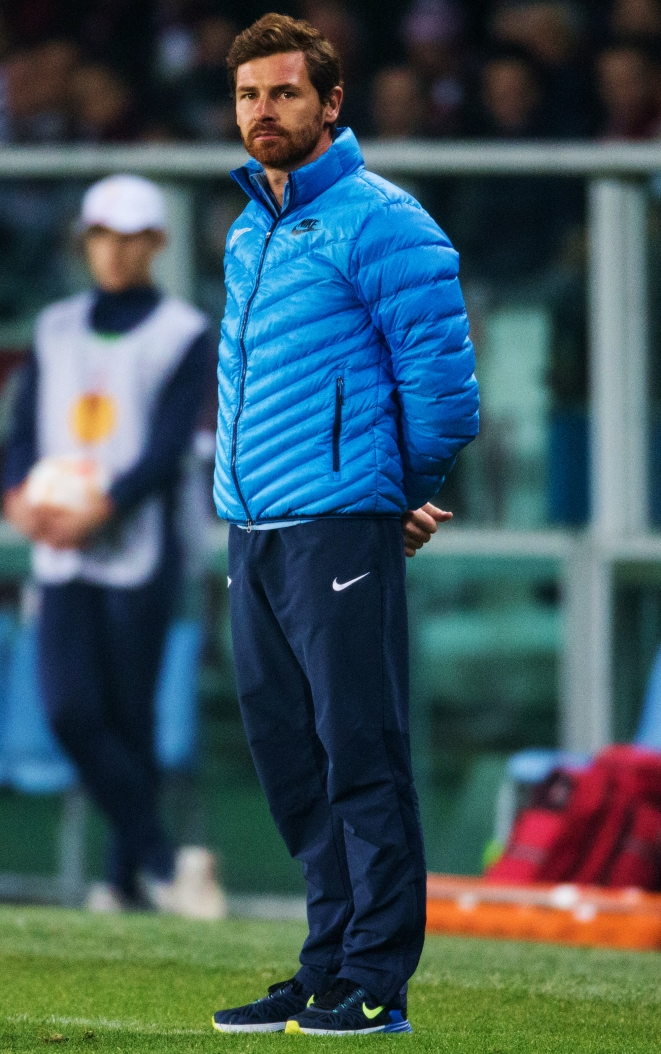
Villas-Boas managing Zenit in 2015

On 18 March 2014, Villas-Boas signed a two-year deal with Zenit Saint Petersburg, replacing Luciano Spalletti, and took the reins the day after the club's Champions League round of 16 second leg against Borussia Dortmund. A month later, he went on to become the first coach in Russian Premier League history to win his first six matches in charge. He continued to pursue the title but on 3 May, Zenit lost their first points in a 1–1 away draw with Lokomotiv Moscow being followed by a 2–4 loss at home to Dynamo Moscow which gave the league advantage to CSKA Moscow. In the final fixture of the Russian Premier League on 16 May, Zenit won 4–1 away against Kuban Krasnodar but it was not enough to win the title, as CSKA defeated Lokomotiv and were crowned champions one point ahead of Zenit. However, the St. Petersburg club clinched a place in the 2014–15 UEFA Champions League Third qualifying round.

In the 2014–15 season, Zenit qualified for the UEFA Champions League group stage by beating AEL Limassol in the third round qualification and Standard Liège in the playoffs. On 17 May 2015, Villas-Boas led the club to the fifth league title in its history, clinching it after a 1–1 draw against Ufa with two games left to play.

On 10 September 2015, Villas-Boas announced he would return to Portugal because of his family and therefore be leaving Zenit at the end of the 2015–16 season after turning down a contract extension. In the 2015–16 Champions League Zenit finished top of the Group H, being eliminated by Benfica in the Round of 16. On 2 May 2016, Zenit won the Russian Cup by beating CSKA Moscow 4–1 in the final in Kazan, this was the Portuguese's last achievement for the Russian side, leaving at the end of the season and with Mircea Lucescu appointed the new manager.

=== Shanghai SIPG ===
On 4 November 2016, Villas-Boas became the manager of Shanghai SIPG, replacing Sven-Göran Eriksson for the Chinese Super League club. Despite not being able to win any major silverware during his stint at the club, Villas-Boas has been credited with turning a relatively inexperienced side into a true championship contender. Bolstered by the talents of Brazilians Hulk and Oscar as well as star Chinese attacker Wu Lei, his only season at the helm saw SIPG finish second in the league, losing to rivals Shanghai Shenhua in the final of the Chinese FA cup, as well as reaching the semi-finals of the Asian Champions League, the club's best result in the competition to date (as of November 2019).

Villas-Boas' stint at SIPG was also marred by a number of controversial remarks he made throughout the campaign, some of which were in response to star midfielder Oscar's controversial 8-match suspension for kicking the ball at an opponent during play. He also repeatedly lambasted match officials for favouring eventual league champions Guangzhou Evergrande, notably following a game between Guangzhou and Yanbian Funde where Guangzhou defender Liu Jian scored following a handball gifting Guangzhou a crucial victory. By the time of his departure from SIPG, he was yet to serve out his suspension for these remarks.

In November 2017, Shanghai SIPG announced Villas-Boas left the club by mutual consent after he refused to extend his contract for another year.

=== Marseille ===
On 28 May 2019, Villas-Boas signed a two-year contract to be the new manager of Marseille, replacing Rudi Garcia.

In the 2019–20 Ligue 1 season, Marseille finished second after the season was ended early due to the coronavirus pandemic, thus qualifying for the 2020–21 UEFA Champions League for the first time since 2013–14. On September 13, 2020, he became the first Olympian coach in nine years to lead his squad to an away 1–0 victory in Le Classique against Paris Saint-Germain.

On 2 February 2021, Villas-Boas announced in a press conference that he had offered his resignation to the club's board due to his dissatisfaction with the club's recruitment policy, namely them signing Celtic player Olivier Ntcham on loan the previous day against his wishes. A few hours later, Marseille announced the suspension of Villas-Boas as manager with immediate effect, with the club branding his public criticism of the club "unacceptable" and confirming that disciplinary hearings against Villas-Boas would take place.

== President of FC Porto ==
After he left Marseille, Villas-Boas decided to end his managerial career and retired from football management altogether. Sometime during 2022, Villas-Boas revealed the reason he gave up his coaching career was to focus on his candidacy as Porto president.

In the elections held on 27 April 2024, he defeated the sitting president, Jorge Nuno Pinto da Costa, who left office after holding the position for 42 consecutive years. Villas-Boas' candidacy was the most voted in the club's elections, held at the Estádio do Dragão, with 21,489 of the 26,876 votes cast, compared to 5,224 from Pinto da Costa's list and 53 from Nuno Lobo's. With this, he became the 32nd president of Porto.

== Motorsport career ==
On 29 November 2017, it was announced that Villas-Boas would compete in the 2018 Dakar Rally driving a Toyota Hilux and co-driven by former motorcycle class frontrunner Ruben Faria. He withdrew from the rally after crashing into a sand dune on the fourth stage in Peru and injuring his back.

On 16 and 17 March 2018, Villas-Boas participated in another off-road rally, the Baja TT do Pinhal, driving a Can-Am Maverick X3.

Following his departure from Marseille in 2021, Villas-Boas made his maiden appearance in the World Rally Championship between 20 and 23 May, competing in the WRC3 category of the 2021 Rally de Portugal. Driving a Citroën C3 Rally2 alongside co-driver Gonçalo Magalhães, the pair finished 12th.

Villas-Boas has said that he is unlikely to make a WRC return, and intends to compete again in the Dakar Rally.

== Racing record ==
=== Complete WRC results ===
Year	Entrant	Car	1	2	3	4	5	6	7	8	9	10	11	12	WDC	Points
2021	N/A	Citroën C3 R5/Rally2	MON	ARC	CRO	POR; 32	ITA	KEN	EST	BEL	GRE	FIN	ESP	MNZ	NC	0

== Personal life ==
In 2004, Villas-Boas married Joana Maria Noronha de Ornelas Teixeira, with whom he now has two daughters, Benedita (born June 2009), Carolina (born October 2010) and a son, Frederico (born May 2015). He speaks English fluently, having been taught by his paternal grandmother Margaret Kendall, whose mother moved to Portugal from Cheadle, Stockport, England, to start a wine business. Her brother Douglas Kendall served as a wing commander for the Royal Air Force during the Second World War.

His paternal great-uncle José Rui Villas-Boas was the Viscount of Guilhomil, a title initially bestowed on his father José Gerado Villas-Boas by King Carlos I in 1890.

Villas-Boas' brother João Luís de Pina Cabral Villas-Boas is a Portuguese stage and television actor. He had a bit-part in the costume drama Mistérios de Lisboa (Mysteries of Lisbon).

== Managerial statistics ==
As of 2 February 2021

Team	From	To	Record					Ref
Team	From	To	P	W	D	L	Win %	Ref
Académica	14 October 2009	2 June 2010	30	11	9	10	36.67	
Porto	2 June 2010	21 June 2011	58	49	5	4	84.48	
Chelsea	22 June 2011	4 March 2012	40	19	11	10	47.50	
Tottenham Hotspur	3 July 2012	16 December 2013	80	44	20	16	55.00	
Zenit Saint Petersburg	20 March 2014	23 May 2016	102	63	20	19	61.76	
Shanghai SIPG	4 November 2016	30 November 2017	51	30	9	12	58.82	
Marseille	28 May 2019	2 February 2021	60	28	14	18	46.67	
Total			421	244	88	89	57.96	

== Honours ==
Porto

- Primeira Liga: 2010–11
- Taça de Portugal: 2010–11
- Supertaça Cândido de Oliveira: 2010
- UEFA Europa League: 2010–11

Zenit Saint Petersburg

- Russian Premier League: 2014–15
- Russian Cup: 2015–16
- Russian Super Cup: 2015

Individual

- CNID Breakthrough Coach: 2010
- CNID Best Coach: 2011
- Globos de Ouro Prémio Revelação: 2011
- Premier League Manager of the Month: December 2012, February 2013

== See also ==
- List of UEFA Cup and Europa League winning managers
