= Vítor Murta (executive) =

Portuguese sports executive (1975/1976–2026)

Vítor Jorge Fonseca Murta (1975 or 1976 – 16 October 2026) was a Portuguese sports executive. He was the president of Boavista F.C. from 2018 to 2025 and of the club's Sociedade Anónima Desportiva from 2020 to 2024.

== Life and career ==
Murta was a lawyer specialised in tax law. He was vice president of Boavista F.C. during the presidency of João Loureiro. In December 2018, Loureiro did not run for re-election and Murta was elected with 334 votes out of 441 valid ones cast. As part of his election promise, he pledged to put Litos, a former player who won the Primeira Liga for the club in 2000–01, as part of the sporting director team.

In October 2020, Luxembourgish businessman Gérard López bought Boavista, which Murta described as a move that would bring back a competitive Boavista without losing the club's identity. Murta became president of the club's Sociedade Anónima Desportiva. Two months later, the Panteras Negras supporters' group broke off relations with the board over a poor start to the season, accusing Murta's organisation of empty rhetoric.

He was elected unopposed for a second term as Boavista president in January 2022. He pledged to build a pavilion for the club's other departments and praised López as essential for the club's continuation. He resigned as president of the SAD in February 2024 after a 0–4 home loss to S.C. Braga, considering himself "destabilising" as fan energy was directed against him rather than for the team. His presidency of the club ended in January 2025, when Garrido Pereira was elected.

Murta died of a heart attack on 16 October 2026, at the age of 50.
