= Eladio Vaschetto =

Argentine footballer

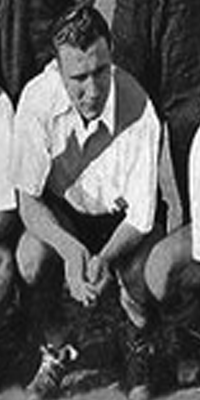
- Vaschetto with River Plate in 1936

Personal information
- Full name: Eladio Vaschetto
- Place of birth: San Jerónimo Norte, Santa Fe, Argentina
- Position: Striker

Youth career
- Libertad SJN

Senior career*
Years	Team	Apps	(Gls)
1934–1935	Colón		
1936–1939	River Plate	71	(27)
1942–1943	Colo-Colo	6	(1)
1944–1947	Puebla	9	(10)

Managerial career
- 1945–1946: Puebla (player-coach)
- 1947–1948: Porto
- 1951–1952: Porto
- * Club domestic league appearances and goals

Eladio Vaschetto was an Argentine football player. He played with Club Atlético River Plate, Colo Colo and Puebla FC in Mexico.

== Biography ==
Born in San Jerónimo Norte, Santa Fe, Argentina, Vaschetto was with club Libertad and Colón before joining Club Atlético River Plate in 1936 where he managed to win 2 league titles in 1936 and 1939. After the 1939 tournament he transferred to Chile were after a few years he managed to sign with top futbol club Colo Colo in 1942. In 1943 after a short stay with Colo Colo, he signed with newly created Puebla FC in Mexico. Vaschetto was the first player to score in the club's history in 1944 against Atlas. During his 3 years at the Mexican club he managed to score 21 goles and helped the club win its first Copa Mexico title in the 1944-45 tournament. After the 1946-47 tournament he retired and soon relocated to Portugal where he managed F.C. Porto during the 1947–48 and the 1951-52 tournaments.

== Honors ==
Club Atlético River Plate

- Argentine Primera División :(2) 1936, 1939

Puebla FC

- Copa Mexico :(1) 1945
