= João Loureiro =

Portuguese sports administrator and musician (born 1963)

President of Boavista
- In office 2 January 2013 – 28 December 2018
- Preceded by: Manuel Maio
- Succeeded by: Vítor Murta
- In office 14 February 1997 – 14 December 2007
- Preceded by: Valentim Loureiro
- Succeeded by: Joaquim Teixeira

Personal details
- Born: 9 October 1963 (age 63) Porto, Portugal
- Relatives: Valentim Loureiro (father)

João Eduardo Pinto de Loureiro (born 9 October 1963) is a Portuguese sports administrator, lawyer and musician. He was the president of the Portuguese football club Boavista, from 1997 to 2007, and from 2013 to 2018.

Loureiro became publicly known in the 1980s as the singer and keyboardist of the pop-rock band Ban. In 1997, he shifted to a sports administration career when he succeed his father Valentim Loureiro in the presidency of Boavista. Under his leadership, Boavista experienced its most successful period, winning the 1996–97 Taça de Portugal and the 2000–01 Primeira Liga.
