= Jorge Nuno Pinto da Costa =

Portuguese sports executive (1937–2025)

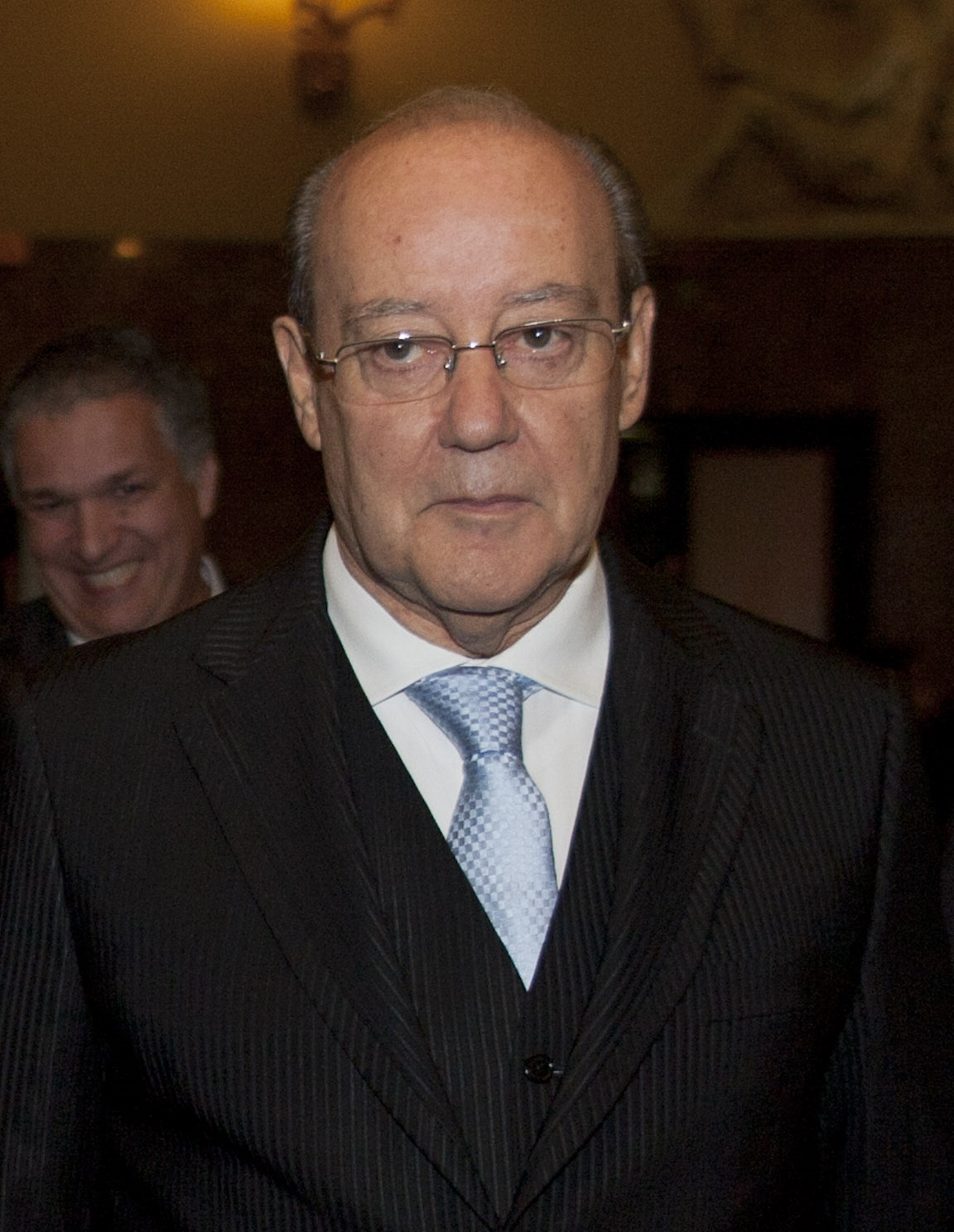
- Pinto da Costa in 2012

31st President of FC Porto
- In office 23 April 1982 – 7 May 2024
- Vice President: Adelino Caldeira; Alípio Fernandes; Eduardo Valente; Emídio Gomes; Fernando Gomes
- Preceded by: Américo Gomes de Sá
- Succeeded by: André Villas-Boas

President of the Portuguese Professional Football League
- In office 13 July 1995 – 23 December 1996
- Preceded by: Manuel Damásio
- Succeeded by: Valentim Loureiro

Personal details
- Born: 28 December 1937 Cedofeita, Porto, Portugal
- Died: 15 February 2025 (aged 87) Porto, Portugal
- Spouses: Manuela Graça (m. 1964; div. 1997) Filomena Morais (m. 1998; div. 2002) Filomena Morais (m. 2007; div. 2012) Fernanda Miranda (m. 2012; div. 2016) Cláudia Campo (m. 2023)
- Children: 2
- Profession: Businessman

Jorge Nuno de Lima Pinto da Costa (28 December 1937 – 15 February 2025) (Portuguese pronunciation: [ˈʒɔɾʒɨ ˈnunu ˈpĩtu ðɐ ˈkɔʃtɐ]) was a Portuguese sports executive, who was president of Portuguese sports club Porto from 1982 until 2024. He was the president with most titles won (69) in the history of football and most days in charge as a president of association football club.

Pinto da Costa was involved in the Portuguese football corruption scandal Apito Dourado, from which he was eventually absolved in April 2009 after receiving a two-year suspension and a €10,000 fine in May 2008.

== Early years ==
Pinto da Costa was born in Cedofeita, the son of José Alexandrino Teixeira da Costa and Maria Elisa Bessa Lima de Amorim Pinto, who fathered four other children, including future forensic pathologist José Eduardo.

In his late teens, Pinto da Costa started working as a bank teller. He began collaborating with Porto, while keeping his day job; in 1953, on his 16th birthday, his maternal grandmother registered him as a club associate and he was a frequent attender of the team's football and roller hockey games, eventually going on to work in directorial capacities in the latter department, in his early 20s.

== Directorial beginnings ==
Jorge Nuno Pinto da Costa's career at Porto started when he was just 20 years old, after accepting the club's invitation to join the rink hockey administrative commission. In 1962, he became chief of the rink hockey department, a job he would eventually accumulate after also taking over as chief of the boxing department in 1967. In 1969, he integrated Afonso Pinto de Magalhães's Chairman candidacy list as Head of all Amateur Departments. Their list won the elections and he held the job for the three following years. Despite being invited by future president Américo de Sá to join his then-candidacy list, he refused the offer as he felt the candidate should bring forward a renewed list. He left the club in 1971 after Pinto de Magalhães's mandate was over.

== Return ==
In 1976, Porto's most popular department, association football, was facing the longest title drought in the club's history, having not won the Primeira Liga for 19 years. This period coincided with the rise of neighbours Boavista, who under the guidance of Pinto da Costa's friend and Porto's former player and coach, José Maria Pedroto, would win later that season the Taça de Portugal.

On the same night, Porto's transfer target, Brazilian player Amarildo, fled to city rivals Boavista at the last minute; Pinto da Costa was provoked by friends, some of whom were directors of Boavista, with allegations that Boavista had surpassed Porto as the city's major sporting force. He considered this an outrage and vowed on that night to return to his beloved club. Soon after, he contacted Porto's chairman Américo de Sá and both arranged his return through the former's re-election list, this time as director of football. Before the elections, he agreed terms with José Maria Pedroto, who was still coaching Boavista at the time. In May 1976, chairman Américo de Sá was re-elected, and Pinto da Costa returned to the club as director of football, alongside Pedroto as a coach.

== Rise and first victories ==
It was under Pinto da Costa's and José Maria Pedroto's guidance that, in 1976–77, Porto won the Taça de Portugal, their first silverware in 18 years. During the following season, their success continued when they finally broke their 19-year-old title drought and won the 1977–78 league. The 1978–79 season would mark a back-to-back league title for both men. Subsequently, though, in 1980, after failing a third title in a row, internal disputes regarding other sporting departments having too much influence in Porto football section led to their resignation. Following their resignation, 15 first-team players refused to play for the club. This specific period of time is dubbed as "Verão Quente" (Hot summer).

== Pinto da Costa and Pedroto, Chairman and Manager ==
On 17 April 1982, following internal disputes in Porto, Pinto da Costa was elected the 31st Chairman of the club and took office on 23 April. He chose Pedroto as the association football manager and this partnership was to have a lasting effect on Porto's whole structure. Pedroto was a visionary, a highly talented football player whose charisma as a coach was unique. Under Pedroto, in 1984, Porto reached its first European final. Porto lost 2–1 to Juventus in Basel, in the Cup Winners' Cup final. By then, Pedroto was already ill, having been diagnosed with cancer. He would resign his duties and died shortly afterwards, in 1985.

=== European Champions ===
Artur Jorge was appointed Pedroto's replacement, and European recognition would finally come under his spell. In 1987, Porto faced Bayern Munich for the European Cup final. At half-time, Bayern took a 1–0 lead. But the rookie Portuguese side would come back to claim a historic victory. Algerian Rabah Madjer scored with his heel to draw the match, and Juary later sealed the 2–1 win that ensured Porto the biggest feat of its near centenary history.

== Years of domestic success – association football ==
Domestic success continued to be a hallmark of Porto in subsequent years, and 1995–99 became the highest note of Portuguese domestic competition ever, following titles by Bobby Robson (1995 and 1996) and António Oliveira (1997 and 1998); Fernando Santos captured a record-setting fifth consecutive title in 1999.

Porto later achieved second place in the championship, but won the 2000 and 2001 Portuguese Cups (whilst reaching the European quarter-finals in both seasons), only to replace Fernando Santos with Octávio Machado. Octávio, however, only had a short stint at Porto. His replacement would be José Mourinho.

=== 1999 Sweep ===
At the end of the 1998–99 season, Porto swept the Portuguese professional sports by winning all the competitions in which it had a professional team: football, handball, basketball and rink hockey. It also won the swimming national championship, which made a total of five championship titles in the same year. In Portugal, it was called the "double penta", referring to the five consecutive championships in football.

== José Mourinho era ==
Mourinho joined Porto in January 2002, and the club was in fifth place on the table. Mourinho would ensure a UEFA Cup berth for the following season, ending the league in third. The summer of 2002 saw a lot of movement on the transfer market by Porto. The bets consisted mainly of Portuguese players playing in Portugal, yet to prove their true worth, as well as, for the most part, little-known foreigners. It most certainly worked, and such was Mourinho's impressive work in Porto that he managed to lead the club to two glorious seasons in 2003 and 2004, wrapping up consecutive Portuguese titles and a UEFA Cup and Champions League in quick succession. During this period, Pinto da Costa remained somewhat in Mourinho's shadow and allowed him a very firm grip on all matters regarding football.

== Post-Mourinho era ==
Victory in the Champions League final in 2004 meant that Mourinho left Porto, looking for another challenge in a bigger league. He was replaced by Luigi Delneri, who only lasted four weeks on the job. In came Victor Fernandez, who qualified the club for the Champions League last 16 and won the Intercontinental Cup. He was sacked in late January 2005 following a home defeat to Braga, which saw the club lose the championship lead. José Couceiro took over and led the club to a final standing of second in the league. He subsequently resigned his post.

In late May 2005, Co Adriaanse, the former coach of Willem II, Ajax and AZ Alkmaar, was appointed the new Porto coach.

Under his guidance, Porto became an attacking team, and the results were mixed, solid performances mixed with severe defensive flaws. European results, in particular, were terrible, and Porto suffered a humiliating exit from the UEFA Champions League in the group stage.

However, Adriaanse still guided Porto to a domestic double, wrapping up the title with two games to spare, and beating Vitória de Setúbal in the Cup final.

Adriaanse resigned before the start of the 2006–07 season, due to internal disputes with the club's board, and was subsequently replaced by former Benfica and Braga manager Jesualdo Ferreira, who had only just joined arch-rivals Boavista that season, and left without managing a single competitive match for Boavista. With him, Porto won the league three consecutive times in 2006–07, 2007–08 and 2008–09.

In the 2010–11 season, with André Villas-Boas, Porto won the Portuguese Super Cup, the Portuguese league, the UEFA Europa League and the Portuguese Cup.

From 2013 to 2017, he failed to conquer any silverware, contributing to the biggest hiatus during his presidency.

On 28 April 2024, 46-year-old former Porto manager André Villas-Boas defeated Pinto da Costa in the club's presidential elections, ending his 42-year term. Villas-Boas took 80.3% and announced "Porto is free again".

== Apito Dourado affair ==
Pinto da Costa was one of the people investigated by the police as part of the Apito Dourado (Golden Whistle) sports corruption scandal in Portuguese football. The investigation caused him to flee to Spain with his then partner Carolina Salgado in order to avoid detention in 2004. He was formally accused of corruption on 12 June 2007, along with Reinaldo Teles, another member of Porto's administration.

Following the inquiry, Pinto da Costa vowed to appeal the two-year ban placed on him by the LPFP's Discipline Committee in order to clear both his and the club's names. In a short interview, he stated: "We will not appeal the points deductions and we will still have a 14 or 15-point lead. But Porto's honour will be salvaged because I, personally, as president and a citizen, will appeal on Monday to the Justice Council. After this appeal, we will wait to see the truth come out and it will allow us to show there is no reason for Porto to have been penalised."

In early April 2009, Pinto da Costa was declared innocent in all allegations relating to bribery or any case dealing with Apito Dourado.

Later, on 21 January 2010, the Portuguese newspaper Correio da Manhã revealed that many of the wiretapped phone calls in the Apito Dourado scandal were made public on YouTube.

In May 2011, the decision made by the LPFP's Discipline Committee that initially punished Porto (six points were deducted) and Pinto da Costa (suspended for two years) was declared void and was thus annulled by the Administrative Court of Lisbon. Porto recovered those points in July 2017.

== Personal life and death ==
His daughter Joana married football manager Vítor Martins in 2019.

Jorge Nuno Pinto da Costa was diagnosed with prostate cancer in September 2021. He died from the illness on 15 February 2025, at the age of 87.

== Football honours ==
=== Domestic ===
- Primeira Liga: 23
  - 1984–85, 1985–86, 1987–88, 1989–90, 1991–92, 1992–93, 1994–95, 1995–96, 1996–97, 1997–98, 1998–99, 2002–03, 2003–04, 2005–06, 2006–07, 2007–08, 2008–09, 2010–11, 2011–12, 2012–13, 2017–18, 2019–20, 2021–22
- Taça de Portugal: 15
  - 1983–84, 1987–88, 1990–91, 1993–94, 1997–98, 1999–2000, 2000–01, 2002–03, 2005–06, 2008–09, 2009–10, 2010–11, 2019–20, 2021–22, 2022–23
- Taça da Liga: 1
  - 2022–23
- Supertaça Cândido de Oliveira: 22
  - 1983, 1984, 1986, 1990, 1991, 1993, 1994, 1996, 1998, 1999, 2001, 2003, 2004, 2006, 2009, 2010, 2011, 2012, 2013, 2018, 2020, 2022

=== International ===
- Intercontinental Cup: 2

- 1987, 2004

- European Cup/UEFA Champions League: 2

- 1986–87, 2003–04

- UEFA Cup/UEFA Europa League: 2

- 2002–03, 2010–11

- European Super Cup: 1

- 1987

In December 2011, he won the "Director's Career" and "Director of the Year" awards at the Globe Soccer Awards hosted in Dubai.

== See also ==
- Carolina Salgado
