= 1998 Taça de Portugal final =

- Event: 1997–98 Taça de Portugal
Braga	Porto
1	3
- Date: 24 May 1998
- Venue: Estádio Nacional, Oeiras
- Referee: Jorge Coroado (Lisbon)

The 1998 Taça de Portugal final was the final match of the 1997–98 Taça de Portugal, the 58th season of the Taça de Portugal, the premier Portuguese football cup competition organized by the Portuguese Football Federation (FPF). The match was played on 24 May 1998 at the Estádio Nacional in Oeiras, and opposed two Primeira Liga sides Braga and Porto. Porto defeated Braga 3–1 to claim the Taça de Portugal for a ninth time in their history.

In Portugal, the final was televised live on RTP. As Porto claimed both league and cup double in the same season, cup runners-up Braga faced their cup final opponents in the 1998 Supertaça Cândido de Oliveira.

== Match ==
=== Details ===
24 May 1998
17:00 WEST

Braga	1–3	Porto
Sílvio 48'		Aloísio 16'; Jardel 24'; Artur 90'

Estádio Nacional, Oeiras
Referee: Jorge Coroado (Lisbon)

Braga	Porto

GK	1	(Portugal) Quim
RB	2	(Portugal) Zé Nuno Azevedo
CB	19	(Portugal) Artur Jorge (c)	(yellow card) 10'	(substituted off) 53'
CB	10	(Portugal) Sérgio Abreu
LB	15	(Portugal) Lino	(yellow card) 64'
RM	20	(Portugal) Jordão
CM	6	(Portugal) Mozer	(yellow card) 18'
CM	4	(Federal Republic of Yugoslavia) Srđan Bajčetić
LM	27	(Portugal) António Formoso		(substituted off) 53'
CF	16	(Croatia) Mladen Karoglan	(yellow card) 61'
CF	28	(Brazil) Sílvio	(yellow card) 4'	(substituted off) 83'
Substitutes:
GK	24	(Poland) Andrzej Woźniak
DF	23	(Portugal) Rui Guerreiro
MF	18	(Portugal) Carlitos		(substituted on) 53'
MF	22	(Portugal) Bruno		(substituted on) 53'
FW	28	(Russia) Dmitri Prokopenko		(substituted on) 83'
Manager:
(Spain) Alberto Argibay Pazos

GK	1	(Portugal) Rui Correia
RB	30	(Portugal) Carlos Secretário
CB	4	(Brazil) Aloísio (c)	(yellow card) 63'
CB	19	(Portugal) João Manuel Pinto	(yellow card) 20' (red card) 62'
LB	18	(Portugal) Daniel Kenedy	(yellow card) 89'
CM	20	(Portugal) Paulinho Santos
CM	27	(Brazil) Doriva	(yellow card) 89'
RM	7	(Portugal) Sérgio Conceição		(substituted off) 85'
AM	25	(Slovenia) Zlatko Zahovič	(yellow card) 60'	(substituted off) 65'
LM	11	(Federal Republic of Yugoslavia) Ljubinko Drulović
CF	16	(Brazil) Mário Jardel		(substituted off) 75'
Substitutes:
GK	12	(Sweden) Lasse Eriksson
DF	2	(Portugal) Jorge Costa	(yellow card) 78'	(substituted on) 66'
MF	21	(Portugal) Capucho		(substituted on) 85'
FW	8	(Portugal) Rui Barros
FW	14	(Brazil) Artur	(yellow card) 89'	(substituted on) 75'
Manager:
(Portugal) António Oliveira

1997–98 Taça de Portugal Winners
Porto
9th Title

Match officials

- Assistant referees:
- Fourth official:

Match rules

- 90 minutes.
- Maximum of three substitutions.
