= 1998 Supertaça Cândido de Oliveira =

- Event: Supertaça Cândido de Oliveira (Portuguese Super Cup)
Braga	Porto
1	2
- 1–2 on aggregate.

First leg
Braga	Porto
0	1
- Date: 8 August 1998
- Venue: Estádio das Antas, Porto
- Referee: Vítor Pereira (Lisbon)

Second leg
Porto	Braga
1	1
- Date: 9 September 1998
- Venue: Estádio Primeiro de Maio, Braga
- Referee: Jorge Coroado (Lisbon)

The 1998 Supertaça Cândido de Oliveira was the 20th edition of the Supertaça Cândido de Oliveira, the annual Portuguese football season-opening match contested by the winners of the previous season's top league and cup competitions (or cup runner-up in case the league- and cup-winning club is the same). The 1998 Supertaça Cândido de Oliveira was contested over two legs, and opposed two Primeira Liga sides Braga and Porto. Porto qualified for the SuperCup by winning the 1997–98 Primeira Divisão and the 1997–98 Taça de Portugal, whilst Braga gained entry into the competition as the cup runners-up due to the Dragões claiming both league and cup in the same season.

The first leg which took place at the Estádio das Antas, saw Porto win 1–0 thanks to a Zlatko Zahovič goal. The second leg which took place at the Estádio Primeiro de Maio, saw a 1–1 tie between both sides, and thus allow Porto to win 2–1 on aggregate over two legs which would give the Portistas their tenth Supertaça Cândido de Oliveira.

== First leg ==
=== Details ===
8 August 1998

Porto	1–0	Braga
Zahovič 48'

Estádio das Antas, Porto
Referee: Vítor Pereira (Lisbon)

Porto	Braga

GK	24	(Federal Republic of Yugoslavia) Ivica Kralj	(substituted off) 31'
RB	7	(Portugal) Carlos Secretário
CB	2	(Portugal) Jorge Costa
CB	4	(Brazil) Aloísio (c)
LB	5	(Portugal) Fernando Mendes
CM	20	(Portugal) Paulinho Santos
AM	8	(Portugal) Rui Barros
AM	25	(Slovenia) Zlatko Zahovič
RW	21	(Portugal) Capucho	(substituted off) 73'
LW	10	(Portugal) António Folha	(substituted off) 45'
CF	9	(Poland) Grzegorz Mielcarski
Substitutes:
GK	1	(Portugal) Rui Correia	(substituted on) 31'
MF	11	(Federal Republic of Yugoslavia) Ljubinko Drulović	(substituted on) 45'
FW	15	(Hungary) Miklós Fehér	(substituted on) 73'
Manager:
(Portugal) Fernando Santos

GK	1	(Portugal) Quim
RB	2	(Portugal) Zé Nuno Azevedo (c)
CB	5	(Portugal) Idalécio
CB	10	(Portugal) Sérgio Abreu
LB	15	(Portugal) Lino
RM	20	(Portugal) Jordão
CM	14	(Portugal) Vítor Castanheira
CM	22	(Portugal) Bruno	(substituted off) 56'
LM	21	(Portugal) Gamboa	(substituted off) 65'
CF	11	(Brazil) Elpídio Silva
CF	16	(Croatia) Mladen Karoglan	(substituted off) 82'
Substitutes:
DF	8	(Portugal) Alberto Cabral	(substituted on) 82'
MF	7	(Portugal) António Formoso	(substituted on) 65'
FW	17	(Brazil) Dé	(substituted on) 56'
Manager:
(Portugal) Vítor Oliveira

Match officials

- Assistant referees:
- Fourth official:

Match rules

- 90 minutes.
- Maximum of three substitutions

== Second leg ==
=== Details ===
9 September 1998

Braga	1–1	Porto
Formoso 80'		Capucho 69'

Estádio Primeiro de Maio, Braga
Referee: Jorge Coroado (Lisbon)

Braga	Porto

GK	1	(Portugal) Quim
RB	2	(Portugal) Zé Nuno Azevedo (c)
CB	4	(Brazil) Odair
CB	10	(Portugal) Sérgio Abreu
LB	15	(Portugal) Lino
RM	20	(Portugal) Jordão
CM	14	(Portugal) Vítor Castanheira	(substituted off) 68'
CM	6	(Portugal) Mozer	(substituted off) 65'
LM	21	(Portugal) Gamboa
CF	11	(Brazil) Elpídio Silva
CF	16	(Croatia) Mladen Karoglan	(substituted off) 61'
Substitutes:
MF	22	(Portugal) Bruno	(substituted on) 65'
FW	7	(Portugal) António Formoso	(substituted on) 68'
FW	9	(Cape Verde) Toni	(substituted on) 61'
Manager:
(Portugal) Vítor Oliveira

GK	24	(Federal Republic of Yugoslavia) Ivica Kralj
RB	7	(Portugal) Carlos Secretário
CB	2	(Portugal) Jorge Costa
CB	4	(Brazil) Aloísio (c)
LB	17	(Brazil) Doriva
CM	20	(Portugal) Paulinho Santos
AM	26	(Morocco) Youssef Chippo	(substituted off) 89'
AM	25	(Slovenia) Zlatko Zahovič
RW	14	(Brazil) Artur	(substituted off) 65'
LW	11	(Federal Republic of Yugoslavia) Ljubinko Drulović
CF	16	(Brazil) Mário Jardel	(substituted off) 45'
Substitutes:
DF	5	(Portugal) Fernando Mendes	(substituted on) 45'
DF	19	(Portugal) João Manuel Pinto	(substituted on) 89'
FW	21	(Portugal) Capucho	(substituted on) 65'
Manager:
(Portugal) Fernando Santos

1998 Supertaça Cândido de Oliveira Winners
Porto
10th Title

Match officials

- Assistant referees:
- Fourth official:

Match rules

- 90 minutes.
- Maximum of three substitutions
