= 1997–98 Taça de Portugal =

Tournament details
- Country: Portugal
- Dates: September 1997 – 24 May 1998

Final positions
- Champions: Porto (9th title)
- Runners-up: Braga

Tournament statistics
- Top goal scorer(s): Mário Jardel (10 goals)

The 1997–98 Taça de Portugal was the 58th edition of the Portuguese football knockout tournament, organized by the Portuguese Football Federation (FPF). The 1997–98 Taça de Portugal began in September 1997. The final was played on 24 May 1998 at the Estádio Nacional.

Boavista were the previous holders, having defeated Benfica 3–2 in the previous season's final. Defending champions Boavista were eliminated in the quarter-finals by second division side União de Leiria. Porto defeated Braga, 3–1 in the final to win their ninth Taça de Portugal. As a result of Porto winning both the league and cup in the same season, cup finalists Braga would play the Dragões in the 1998 Supertaça Cândido de Oliveira.

== Fifth round ==
Ties were played on the 16 November–17 December, whilst replays were played between the 3–28 December.

16 November 1997	Benfica (I)	3–0	Rio Ave (I)	Estádio da Luz, Lisbon
	Taument 35'; Panduru 56'; Pringle 80'

16 November 1997	Boavista (I)	4–0	Olhanense (III)	Estádio do Bessa, Porto
	Delfim 10'; Ayew 39', 68'; Jacaré 43'

16 November 1997	Desportivo das Aves (II)	2–4 (a.e.t.)	Beira-Mar (II)	Estádio do CD das Aves, Vila das Aves
	Miguel 69'; Nuno Mendes 77'		Fusco 26' (pen.); Welder 87', 114'; Mangonga 116'

16 November 1997	Estoril (II)	2–1	Marítimo (I)	Estádio António Coimbra da Mota, Estoril
	Alexandre Nunes 56'; Álvaro 75'		Zakaria 45'

16 November 1997	Estrela de Portalegre (III)	0–1 (a.e.t.)	Leça (I)	Estádio Municipal de Portalegre, Portalegre
			Tozé 93'

16 November 1997	Felgueiras (II)	1–1 (a.e.t.)	Braga (I)	Estádio Doutor Machado de Matos, Felgueiras
	Azevedo 25'		Gamboa 62'

16 November 1997	Maia (II)	0–0 (a.e.t.)	Feirense (II)	Estádio José Vieira de Carvalho, Maia

16 November 1997	Sporting CP (I)	3–0	Varzim (I)	Estádio José Alvalade, Lisbon
	Machado 98'; Oceano 107'; Lang 119'

16 November 1997	União de Leiria (II)	3–0	Chaves (I)	Estádio Dr. Magalhães Pessoa, Leiria
	Reinaldo 19'; Hugo 45'; Gervino 56'

16 November 1997	União de Montemor (III)	0–0 (a.e.t.)	Vila Real (III)	Estádio 1º de Maio, Montemor-o-Novo

16 November 1997	Vizela (III)	2–0	União de Lamas (II)	Estádio do Futebol Clube de Vizela, Vizela
	Marco 57'; Berto Machado 72'

3 December 1997 Replay	Feirense (II)	2–3	Maia (II)	Estádio Marcolino de Castro, Santa Maria da Feira
	Adilson 90'; Luís 119'		Marco Peixoto 35'; Miguel Barros 101'; João Paulo 118'

3 December 1997 Replay	Vila Real (III)	4–0	União de Montemor (III)	Complexo Desportivo Monte da Forca, Vila Real
	Rui André 13'; Rosário 48'; Schuster 52'; Cerović 87'

17 December 1997	Gil Vicente (II)	1–0	Dragões Sandinenses (IV)	Estádio Adelino Ribeiro Novo, Barcelos
	Tuck 83' (pen.)

17 December 1997	Penafiel (II)	2–1	Estrela de Vendas Novas (III)	Estádio Municipal 25 de Abril, Penafiel
	Carlos Freitas 53'; Monteiro 71'		Barbosa 64'

17 December 1997	Porto (I)	9–1	Juventude de Évora (III)	Estádio das Antas, Porto
	Zahovič 30' (pen.); Jardel 47' (pen.), 49', 55', 57', 67', 82', 89'; Drulović 85'		Kikas 66'

17 December 1997	Portomosense (II)	1–4	Freamunde (III)	Parque de Jogos de Porto de Mós, Porto de Mós

28 December 1997 Replay	Braga (I)	1–0	Felgueiras (II)	Estádio Primeiro de Maio, Braga
	Karoglan 2'

== Sixth round ==
Ties were played between the 28 December to the 14 January. Due to the odd number of teams involved at this stage of the competition, União de Leiria qualified for the quarter-finals due to having no opponent to face at this stage of the competition.

28 December 1997	Gil Vicente (II)	2–0	Estoril (II)	Estádio Adelino Ribeiro Novo, Barcelos
	Lim 4'; Quim 79'

14 January 1998	Benfica (I)	1–0	Beira-Mar (II)	Estádio da Luz, Lisbon
	Gamarra 73'

14 January 1998	Leça (I)	0–2	Sporting CP (I)	Estádio do Leça FC, Leça da Palmeira
			Marioni 28'; Vidigal 89'

14 January 1998	Penafiel (II)	0–1	Braga (I)	Estádio Municipal 25 de Abril, Penafiel
			Baltasar 77'

14 January 1998	Maia (II)	4–5 (a.e.t.)	Porto (I)	Estádio José Vieira de Carvalho, Maia
	Damas 5', 52', 68'; João Paulo 22'		Capucho 26'; Mielcarski 59'; Gaspar 60', 80'; Zahovič 115'

14 January 1998	Vila Real (III)	0–3	Boavista (I)	Complexo Desportivo Monte da Forca, Vila Real
			Luís Manuel 55'; Pedro Emanuel 74'; Couto 84'

14 January 1998	Vizela (III)	0–2	Freamunde (IV)	Estádio do Futebol Clube de Vizela, Vizela

== Quarter-finals ==
Ties were played on the 4 February, whilst replays were played between the 11–17 February.

4 February 1998	Boavista (I)	2–2 (a.e.t.)	União de Leiria (II)	Estádio do Bessa, Porto
	Hélder Batista 4'; Martelinho 43'		Dinda 64'; Gervino 90+1'

4 February 1998	Freamunde (IV)	0–4	Porto (I)	Complexo Desportivo do SC Freamunde, Freamunde
			Barroso 14'; Folha 29'; Drulović 71'; Artur 88'

4 February 1998	Gil Vicente (II)	1–1 (a.e.t.)	Benfica (I)	Estádio Adelino Ribeiro Novo, Barcelos
			Nuno Gomes 42'

4 February 1998	Braga (I)	3–1 (a.e.t.)	Sporting CP (I)	Estádio Primeiro de Maio, Braga
	Bruno 61'; Formoso 101'; Karoglan 103' (pen.)		Marioni 78'

11 February 1998 Replay	Benfica (I)	1–0	Gil Vicente (II)	Estádio da Luz, Lisbon
	Nuno Gomes 55'

17 February 1998 Replay	União de Leiria (II)	3–1 (a.e.t.)	Boavista (I)	Estádio Dr. Magalhães Pessoa, Leiria
	Reinaldo 19'; Duah 101'; Dinda 118'		Delfim 17'

== Semi-finals ==
Ties were played on the 24 February.

24 February 1998	Braga (I)	2–1	Benfica (I)	Estádio Primeiro de Maio, Braga
	Karoglan 32', 58'		Panduru 15'

24 February 1998	União de Leiria (II)	2–3 (a.e.t.)	Porto (I)	Estádio Dr. Magalhães Pessoa, Leiria
	Nunes 61'; Reinaldo 75'		Zahovič 9'; Manuel Pinto 77'; Mielcarski 111'

== Final ==
24 May 1998
17:00 WEST

Braga	1–3	Porto
Sílvio 48'		Aloísio 16'; Jardel 24'; Artur 90'

Estádio Nacional, Oeiras
Referee: Jorge Coroado (Lisbon)
