= 1997 Supertaça Cândido de Oliveira =

- Event: Supertaça Cândido de Oliveira (Portuguese Super Cup)
Boavista	Porto
2	1
- 2–1 on aggregate.

First leg
Boavista	Porto
2	0
- Date: 15 August 1997
- Venue: Estádio do Bessa, Porto
- Referee: Vítor Pereira (Lisbon)

Second leg
Porto	Boavista
1	0
- Date: 10 September 1997
- Venue: Estádio das Antas, Porto
- Referee: Paulo Paraty (Porto)

The 1997 Supertaça Cândido de Oliveira was the 19th edition of the Supertaça Cândido de Oliveira, the annual Portuguese football season-opening match contested by the winners of the previous season's top league and cup competitions (or cup runner-up in case the league- and cup-winning club is the same). The 1997 Supertaça Cândido de Oliveira was contested over two legs, and opposed Boavista and Porto of the Primeira Liga. Porto qualified for the SuperCup by winning the 1996–97 Primeira Divisão, whilst Boavista qualified for the Supertaça by winning the 1996–97 Taça de Portugal.

The first leg which took place at the Estádio do Bessa, saw Boavista defeat Porto 2–0. The second leg which took place at the Estádio das Antas, saw the Dragões defeat the Axadrezados 1–0, but the Axadrezados win a third Supertaça after 2–1 on aggregate over two legs.

== First leg ==
=== Details ===
15 August 1997

Boavista	2–0	Porto
Ayew 59'; Timofte 62'

Estádio do Bessa, Porto
Referee: Vítor Pereira (Lisbon)

Boavista	Porto

GK	12	(Portugal) Ricardo
RB	2	(Portugal) Paulo Sousa (c)
CB	3	(Portugal) Rui Bento
CB	17	(Portugal) Litos
LB	30	(Portugal) Mário Silva
RM	10	(Brazil) Luís Carlos	(substituted off) 15'
CM	4	(Portugal) José Tavares
CM	6	(Portugal) Hélder Baptista
LM	25	(Trinidad and Tobago) Russell Latapy	(substituted off) 45'
CF	13	(Ghana) Kwame Ayew
CF	21	(Portugal) Rui Miguel	(substituted off) 68'
Substitutes:
DF	15	(France) William Quevedo	(substituted on) 15'
MF	7	(Romania) Ion Timofte	(substituted on) 45'
MF	20	(Portugal) Jorge Couto	(substituted on) 68'
Manager:
(Portugal) Mário Reis

GK	1	(Portugal) Rui Correia
RB	15	(Portugal) Neves	(substituted off) 63'
CB	13	(Brazil) Lula
CB	19	(Portugal) João Manuel Pinto
LB	3	(Portugal) Rui Jorge	(substituted off) 63'
DM	20	(Portugal) Paulinho Santos (c)
RM	7	(Portugal) Sérgio Conceição
CM	6	(Portugal) José Barroso
LM	8	(Portugal) Rui Barros
SS	10	(Portugal) António Folha	(substituted off) 63'
CF	16	(Brazil) Mário Jardel
Substitutes:
FW	11	(Federal Republic of Yugoslavia) Ljubinko Drulović	(substituted on) 63'
FW	14	(Brazil) Artur	(substituted on) 63'
FW	21	(Portugal) Capucho	(substituted on) 63'
Manager:
(Portugal) António Oliveira

Match officials

- Assistant referees:
- Fourth official:

Match rules

- 90 minutes.
- Maximum of three substitutions

== Second leg ==
=== Details ===
10 September 1997

Porto	1–0	Boavista
Mendes 8'

Estádio das Antas, Porto
Referee: Paulo Paraty (Porto)

Porto	Boavista

GK	1	(Portugal) Rui Correia
RB	19	(Portugal) João Manuel Pinto
CB	4	(Brazil) Aloísio (c)
LB	13	(Portugal) Fernando Mendes
DM	20	(Portugal) Paulinho Santos
CM	26	(Morocco) Youssef Chippo	(substituted off) 48'
RM	7	(Portugal) Sérgio Conceição
AM	8	(Portugal) Rui Barros
LM	25	(Slovenia) Zlatko Zahovič
SS	10	(Portugal) António Folha	(substituted off) 57'
CF	16	(Brazil) Mário Jardel
Substitutes:
FW	14	(Brazil) Artur	(substituted on) 57'
FW	21	(Portugal) Capucho	(substituted on) 48'
Manager:
(Portugal) António Oliveira

GK	12	(Portugal) Ricardo
RB	2	(Portugal) Paulo Sousa (c)
LF	15	(France) William Quevedo	(substituted off) 85'
CB	17	(Portugal) Litos
CB	5	(Brazil) Isaías
LB	30	(Portugal) Mário Silva
DM	3	(Portugal) Rui Bento
CM	4	(Portugal) José Tavares	(substituted off) 45'
CM	6	(Portugal) Hélder Baptista
CF	13	(Ghana) Kwame Ayew
RF	16	(Portugal) Martelinho	(substituted off) 35'
Substitutes:
MF	14	(Portugal) Delfim Teixeira	(substituted on) 45'
MF	20	(Portugal) Jorge Couto	(substituted on) 85'
FW	18	(Brazil) Jacaré	(substituted on) 35'
Manager:
(Portugal) Mário Reis

1997 Supertaça Cândido de Oliveira Winners
Boavista
3rd Title

Match officials

- Assistant referees:
- Fourth official:

Match rules

- 90 minutes.
- Maximum of three substitutions
