= Welder (disambiguation) =

A welder is a tradesperson who specializes in fusing materials together.

Welder may also refer to:

== Arts and entertainment ==
- Welder (album), a 2010 album by Elizabeth Cook
- The Welder, a 2021 American horror film

== People ==
- Welder (footballer) (born 1969), Brazilian football player
- Weldinho, or Welder da Silva Marçal, Brazilian football player
- Welder Knaf (born 1981), Brazilian para table tennis player
- Thomas Welder (1940–2020), American educator and nun

== Other uses ==
- Harland & Wolff Welders F.C., a football club in Belfast, Northern Ireland
- Welding power supply, a machine used to power arc welding procedures
- Welder Wildlife Foundation, a wildlife foundation in Texas
