= 1997–98 Primeira Divisão =

64th season of top-tier Portuguese football

Primeira Divisão
- Season: 1997–98
- Champions: Porto; 17th title
- Relegated: Leça; Varzim; Belenenses
- Champions League: Porto (group stage); Benfica (second qualifying round)
- Cup Winners' Cup: Braga (first round)
- UEFA Cup: V. Guimarães (first round); Sporting CP (first round); Marítimo (first round)
- Intertoto Cup: Estrela da Amadora (third round)
- Matches: 306
- Goals: 770 (2.52 per match)
- Top goalscorer: Mário Jardel (26 goals)
- Biggest home win: Benfica 7–1 Leça (17 May 1998)
- Biggest away win: 0–4 (3 times)
- Highest scoring: Porto 7–2 Salgueiros (10 May 1998)

The 1997–98 Primeira Divisão was the 64th edition of top flight of Portuguese football. It started on 25 August 1997 with a match between Varzim and Porto, and ended on 17 May 1998. The league was contested by 18 clubs with Porto as the defending champions.

Porto won the league and qualified for the 1998–99 UEFA Champions League group stage, along with Benfica, who qualified for the second round. Braga qualified for the 1998–99 UEFA Cup Winners' Cup first round, and V. Guimarães, Sporting CP and Marítimo qualified for the 1998–99 UEFA Cup; in opposite, Leça, Varzim and Belenenses were relegated to the Liga de Honra. Mário Jardel was the top scorer with 26 goals.

== Promotion and relegation ==
=== Teams relegated to Liga de Honra ===
- Espinho
- União de Leiria
- Gil Vicente

Espinho, União de Leiria and Gil Vicente, were consigned to the Liga de Honra following their final classification in 1996–97 season.

=== Teams promoted from Liga de Honra ===
- Campomaiorense
- Varzim
- Académica

The other three teams were replaced by Campomaiorense, Varzim and Académica from the Liga de Honra.

== Teams ==
=== Stadia and locations ===
Location of teams in Primeira Divisão 1997-98 (Mainland)
Location of teams in Primeira Divisão 1997-98 (Madeira)

Team	Head coach	City	Stadium	1996–97 finish
Académica	(Portugal) Henrique Calisto	Coimbra	Estádio Cidade de Coimbra	3rd in Divisão de Honra
Belenenses	(Bulgaria) Mladenov	Lisbon	Estádio do Restelo	13th
Benfica	(Portugal) Manuel José	Lisbon	Estádio da Luz	3rd
Boavista	(Portugal) Mário Reis	Porto	Estádio do Bessa	7th
Braga	(Spain) Castro Santos	Braga	Estádio Primeiro de Maio	4th
Campomaiorense	(Portugal) Bernardino Pedroto	Campo Maior	Estádio Capitão Cesar Correia	1st in Divisão de Honra
Chaves	(Portugal) José Romão	Chaves	Estádio Municipal de Chaves	10th
Estrela da Amadora	(Portugal) Fernando Santos	Amadora	Estádio José Gomes	9th
Farense	(Spain) Paco Fortes	Faro	Estádio de São Luís	11th
Leça	(Portugal) Rodolfo Reis	Leça da Palmeira	Estádio do Leça FC	14th
Marítimo	(Portugal) Augusto Inácio	Funchal	Estádio dos Barreiros	8th
Porto	(Portugal) António Oliveira	Porto	Estádio das Antas	1st
Rio Ave	(Portugal) Carlos Brito	Vila do Conde	Estádio dos Arcos	15th
Salgueiros	(Portugal) Carlos Manuel	Porto	Estádio Engenheiro Vidal Pinheiro	6th
Sporting	(Portugal) Octávio Machado	Lisbon	Estádio José Alvalade	2nd
Varzim	(Portugal) Horácio Gonçalves	Póvoa de Varzim	Estádio do Varzim Sport Club	2nd in Divisão de Honra
Vitória de Guimarães	(Portugal) Jaime Pacheco	Guimarães	Estádio D. Afonso Henriques	5th
Vitória de Setúbal	(Portugal) Manuel Fernandes	Setúbal	Estádio do Bonfim	12th

=== Managerial changes ===
Team	Outgoing manager	Date of vacancy	Position in table	Incoming manager	Date of appointment
Benfica	(Portugal) Manuel José	20 September 1997	11th	(Mozambique) Mário Wilson	21 September 1997
Leça	(Portugal) Rodolfo Reis	28 September 1997	16th	(Portugal) Vítor Manuel	29 September 1997
Belenenses	(Bulgaria) Mladenov	5 October 1997	17th	(Portugal) Manuel Cajuda	6 October 1997
Campomaiorense	(Portugal) Bernardino Pedroto	19 October 1997	17th	(Portugal) João Alves	20 October 1997
Benfica	(Mozambique) Mário Wilson	1 November 1997	5th	(Scotland) Graeme Souness	2 November 1997
Sporting	(Portugal) Octávio Machado	1 November 1997	4th	(Portugal) Francisco Vital	2 November 1997
Vitória de Guimarães	(Portugal) Jaime Pacheco	2 November 1997	3rd	(Portugal) Quinito	3 November 1997
Chaves	(Portugal) José Romão	9 November 1997	18th	(Portugal) Manuel Correia	10 November 1997
Vitória de Setúbal	(Portugal) Manuel Fernandes	9 November 1997	14th	(Spain) Barrios	10 November 1997
Sporting	(Portugal) Francisco Vital	6 December 1997	5th	(Argentina) Vicente Cantatore	7 December 1997
Boavista	(Portugal) Mário Reis	12 December 1997	15th	(Portugal) Jaime Pacheco	13 December 1997
Salgueiros	(Portugal) Carlos Manuel	20 December 1997	6th	(Portugal) Dito	21 December 1997
Sporting	(Argentina) Vicente Cantatore	21 December 1997	5th	(Portugal) Carlos Manuel	22 December 1997
Académica Coimbra	(Portugal) Henrique Calisto	31 January 1997	15th	(Portugal) José Romão	15 February 1998
Chaves	(Portugal) Manuel Correia	11 January 1998	17th	(Portugal) Álvaro Magalhães	12 January 1998
Braga	(Spain) Castro Santos	19 January 1998	10th	(Spain) Alberto Pazos	20 January 1998
Varzim	(Portugal) Horácio Gonçalves	22 March 1998	16th	(Portugal) António Miranda	23 March 1998
Vitória de Setúbal	(Spain) Barrios	5 April 1998	13th	(Portugal) Carlos Cardoso	6 April 1998

== League table ==
Pos	Team	Pld	W	D	L	GF	GA	GD	Pts	Qualification or relegation
1	Porto (C)	34	24	5	5	75	38	+37	77	Qualification to Champions League group stage
2	Benfica	34	20	8	6	62	29	+33	68	Qualification to Champions League second qualifying round
3	Vitória de Guimarães	34	17	8	9	42	25	+17	59	Qualification to UEFA Cup First round
4	Sporting CP	34	15	11	8	45	33	+12	56	Qualification to UEFA Cup First round
5	Marítimo	34	16	8	10	44	35	+9	56	Qualification to UEFA Cup First round
6	Boavista	34	15	10	9	54	31	+23	55	
7	Estrela da Amadora	34	14	8	12	42	41	+1	50	Qualification to Intertoto Cup third round
8	Salgueiros	34	13	10	11	48	44	+4	49	
9	Rio Ave	34	12	10	12	43	43	0	46	
10	Braga	34	11	12	11	48	49	−1	45	Qualification to Cup Winners' Cup first round (Note: Braga qualified for the Cup Winners' Cup as Portuguese Cup runners-up)
11	Campomaiorense	34	11	7	16	53	58	−5	40	
12	Leça (R)	34	10	8	16	29	52	−23	38	Relegation to Segunda Divisão de Honra (Note: Leça was demoted administratively)
13	Vitória de Setúbal	34	10	7	17	38	43	−5	37	
14	Farense	34	8	13	13	41	50	−9	37	
15	Académica	34	8	12	14	27	41	−14	36	
16	Chaves	34	10	5	19	31	55	−24	35	
17	Varzim (R)	34	6	11	17	26	51	−25	29	Relegation to Segunda Divisão de Honra
18	Belenenses (R)	34	5	9	20	22	52	−30	24	Relegation to Segunda Divisão de Honra

Source: Primeira Divisão
Rules for classification: 1st points, 2nd head-to-head, 3rd goals average
(C) Champions; (R) Relegated

== Results ==
Home \ Away	ACA	BEL	BEN	BOA	BRA	CPM	CHA	EST	FAR	LEÇ	MAR	POR	RAV	SAL	SCP	VAR	VGU	VSE
Académica		0–0	1–2	2–0	2–2	1–1	1–2	0–1	1–0	1–1	0–0	0–1	0–0	2–1	1–1	1–1	2–1	2–0
Belenenses	2–0		1–2	0–0	2–2	0–1	0–1	0–2	0–3	0–1	0–2	1–0	2–4	1–2	0–4	1–0	1–0	1–0
Benfica	1–1	2–1		1–2	3–0	4–0	3–1	2–2	3–1	7–1	3–1	3–0	2–1	2–2	0–0	4–0	1–0	2–0
Boavista	6–0	4–0	0–0		0–0	1–2	2–1	4–0	2–2	2–0	0–1	3–4	1–2	3–0	1–0	2–0	0–1	2–1
Braga	3–2	1–1	1–1	1–2		2–1	5–0	1–1	2–2	3–1	3–1	1–2	1–0	0–2	2–0	3–1	3–2	2–2
Campomaiorense	1–2	2–1	1–2	2–2	4–0		2–1	2–0	5–2	4–0	2–1	2–2	4–1	0–0	3–5	1–1	2–3	2–1
Chaves	0–0	1–0	0–1	1–3	1–2	1–0		2–0	2–2	0–1	1–0	2–2	0–2	0–0	3–2	2–1	1–2	1–3
Estrela da Amadora	1–0	1–1	2–0	1–2	1–0	2–1	4–1		2–1	2–1	1–1	2–1	1–2	1–0	2–1	0–0	0–1	1–0
Farense	0–0	3–1	1–1	0–0	1–1	2–2	1–0	1–1		1–1	0–2	1–2	1–0	0–0	0–0	1–0	2–0	2–0
Leça	1–0	1–1	1–2	0–3	0–0	1–0	0–1	0–4	2–1		1–1	2–3	2–1	3–0	1–0	1–0	1–0	1–3
Marítimo	4–1	2–0	1–0	1–0	1–1	2–1	1–0	2–1	1–1	2–0		3–2	3–2	1–4	0–1	2–1	0–1	1–0
Porto	2–1	2–0	2–0	3–2	4–0	3–0	3–1	4–0	5–2	3–1	2–1		2–0	7–2	1–1	4–3	1–0	1–0
Rio Ave	3–0	3–0	3–1	1–1	0–4	1–1	1–0	1–0	0–3	2–2	2–0	0–0		1–1	0–0	0–0	1–2	3–0
Salgueiros	0–1	1–1	0–2	1–1	1–0	5–2	2–0	2–1	4–1	0–0	2–0	1–3	5–1		0–2	3–1	0–0	1–1
Sporting CP	1–0	1–0	1–4	1–0	1–1	2–0	2–0	2–2	3–2	2–0	1–1	2–0	2–2	2–1		1–1	1–1	2–1
Varzim	1–1	2–1	0–0	0–0	1–0	3–0	1–1	2–2	1–0	1–0	0–4	0–2	1–3	0–2	0–1		1–2	1–0
Vitória de Guimarães	1–0	2–2	0–1	1–1	1–0	2–1	5–1	1–0	2–0	0–0	0–0	0–1	0–0	3–0	1–0	5–0		2–1
Vitória de Setúbal	0–1	0–0	1–0	1–2	5–1	2–1	1–2	2–1	4–1	2–1	1–1	1–1	1–0	1–3	2–0	1–1	0–0	

Source: Foradejogo (in Portuguese)
Legend: Blue = home team win; Yellow = draw; Red = away team win.

== Top goalscorers ==
Rank	Player	Club	Goals
1	(Brazil) Mário Jardel	Porto	26
2	(Portugal) Nuno Gomes	Benfica	18
3	(Ghana) Ayew	Boavista	16
4	(Brazil) Isaías	Campomaiorense	14
4	(Croatia) Karoglan	Braga	14
6	(Portugal) Nandinho	Salgueirs	13
7	(Brazil) Gilmar	Vitória de Guimarães	12
7	(Portugal) Constantino Jardim	Leça	12
7	(Cape Verde) Artur Jorge Vicente	Braga	12
10	(Azerbaijan) Vali Gasimov	Vitória de Setúbal	11
10	(Canada) Alex Bunbury	Marítimo	11

== Attendances ==
#	Club	Average
1	Benfica	31,588
2	Porto	24,353
3	Sporting	15,176
4	Vitória SC	9,353
5	Braga	8,000
6	Académica	7,941
7	Farense	5,647
8	Boavista	5,588
9	Marítimo	5,353
10	Varzim	4,882
11	Vitória FC	4,765
12	Rio Ave	4,529
13	Campomaiorense	3,706
14	Chaves	3,647
15	Salgueiros	3,500
16	Os Belenenses	2,824
17	Leça	2,824
18	Estrela da Amadora	2,735
