= Argibay =

Argibay is a Spanish surname, especially used in Argentina. Notable people with the surname include:

- Alberto Argibay (1932–2007), Argentine actor
- Alberto Argibay (football manager) (born 1965), Spanish football manager
- Carmen Argibay (1939–2014), Argentine judge, member of the Supreme Court of Argentina

== See also ==
- Ana Marzoa (born 1949 as Ana Beatriz Vázquez Argibay), Argentine-Spanish actress
