= Ion Timofte =

Romanian footballer (born 1967)

Personal information
- Date of birth: 16 December 1967 (age 58)
- Place of birth: Anina, Romania
- Height: 1.77 m (5 ft 10 in)
- Position: Midfielder

Team information
- Current team: Politehnica Timișoara (sporting director)

Youth career
- 1984–1987: Minerul Anina

Senior career*
Years	Team	Apps	(Gls)
1987–1988	Minerul Anina		
1989	CSM Reșița		
1989–1991	Politehnica Timișoara	65	(19)
1991–1994	Porto	69	(24)
1994–2000	Boavista	146	(37)
Total		280	(80)

International career
1991–1995	Romania	10	(1)

Managerial career
- 2000–2002: UM Timișoara (president)
- 2014–2015: ACS Poli Timișoara (president)
- 2016: Boavista (sporting director)
- 2019–2022: ASU Politehnica Timișoara (counselor)
- 2025–: Politehnica Timișoara (sporting director)
- * Club domestic league appearances and goals

Ion Timofte (born 16 December 1967) is a Romanian former professional footballer who played as an attacking midfielder, currently sporting director at Liga II club Politehnica Timișoara.

He spent the vast majority of his career in Portugal, amassing Primeira Liga totals of 215 matches and 61 goals over nine seasons with Porto and Boavista and winning seven major titles both clubs combined.

== Club career ==
=== Early years and Politehnica Timișoara ===
Timofte was born on 16 December 1967 in Anina, Romania and began playing junior-level football at local club Minerul, starting his senior career at the same team in Divizia C. In 1988 he went to play for Divizia B side CSM Reșița.

His talent was noticed by coach Constantin Rădulescu who brought him to Politehnica Timișoara where he made his Divizia A debut on 23 August 1989 in a 2–1 home loss to Bihor Oradea. Rădulescu also used him in all four matches in the 1990–91 UEFA Cup campaign where they eliminated in the first round Atlético Madrid with 2–1 on aggregate, being defeated in the next one by Sporting Lisbon. Timofte made his last Divizia A appearance on 23 June 1991 in a 1–0 away loss to Universitatea Cluj, totaling 65 matches with 19 goals in the competition, all of them for Politehnica.

=== Porto ===
In 1991, Timofte joined Portuguese side Porto where he was recommended by Mircea Lucescu and they were also impressed when they watched him scoring for Romania in a friendly against Spain. He made his Primeira Liga debut on 24 August as coach Carlos Alberto Silva used him as a starter in a 2–0 away victory against Estoril in which he opened the score. He would go on to score in the following round in a 5–0 victory against União Torreense, then in January 1992 he managed a brace in another 5–0 win, this time against Estoril. By the end of the season he scored the decisive goal with his right-foot, even though he was a lefty, in a 3–2 O Clássico away victory against Benfica. That win helped his side gain an important seven points advantage over Benfica in the fight for the title which The Dragons eventually won, Timofte contributing with a total of nine goals in 31 appearances. He also helped his side win the 1991 Supertaça Cândido de Oliveira, scoring the only goal of the second leg victory against Benfica.

He started the following season by scoring the only goal from a penalty in another derby win against Benfica. By the end of the season he was the team's top-scorer, having netted 11 goals in the league, including one in a 1–0 win over Beira-Mar which helped them mathematically win the championship. In the same season he played three games in the Champions League group stage, netting once in a 2–0 home victory against IFK Göteborg.

Timofte won the 1993 Supertaça Cândido de Oliveira, being used by coach Tomislav Ivić in the 1–0 win in the second leg against Benfica. He played three games in the Champions League group stage, scoring once in a 5–0 away victory over Werder Bremen, helping Porto reach the semi-finals where they were defeated by Barcelona, but without him playing. He ended the season by winning another trophy, being used as a starter by coach Bobby Robson in both matches against Sporting Lisbon in the 1994 Taça de Portugal final.

=== Boavista ===
Timofte joined Boavista in 1994, scoring his first goals on 23 September when he managed a brace in a 2–2 draw against Sporting. His first trophy won with the club was the 1996–97 Taça de Portugal, but coach Mário Reis did not use him in the final. However, Reis used him in the first leg of the 1997 Supertaça Cândido de Oliveira in which Timofte closed the score in a 2–0 win over his former club, Porto, helping the club win the trophy.

In the 1998–99 season, under coach Jaime Pacheco, Timofte scored a personal record of 15 league goals, including four against all of the Big Three, consisting of one in away victories against each of Porto (with a 40-meter long-range shot) and Benfica, and two in two draws against Sporting, helping The Panthers finish runner-up. He then played in both legs of the tie against Brøndby IF, providing an assist in the win in the first leg that helped Boavista eliminate the Danes and reach the 1999–2000 Champions League group stage, where he played three games and scored once in a 1–1 draw against Feyenoord. He has a total of 24 matches with five goals in European competitions.

He also began dealing extensively with injuries, retiring in 2000 at the age of 32 after making his last Primeira Liga appearance on 13 May in a 2–2 draw against Braga, totaling 215 matches with 61 goals in the competition.

During his years spent at Boavista he was a fan-favourite, being nicknamed "O Deus Romeno" (The Romanian God). In 2020, Timofte was selected by the fans of Boavista in the team's all time best XI.

== International career ==
Timofte played 10 matches in which he scored once for Romania, making his debut on 3 April 1991 when coach Mircea Rădulescu sent him in the 89th minute to replace Ioan Lupescu in a 0–0 away draw against Switzerland in the Euro 1992 qualifiers. In his following game he opened the score in a 2–0 friendly win against Spain after receiving a cross from Ioan Sabău and striking the ball with a volley that defeated goalkeeper Andoni Zubizarreta. Afterwards he played two more games in the Euro 1992 qualifiers, a win over Scotland and a draw against Bulgaria. Subsequently, Timofte played in a 5–1 home win over Wales in the successful 1994 World Cup qualifiers, but he was surprisingly omitted by coach Anghel Iordănescu from the squad that went to the final tournament. His last two appearances were a draw against Poland and a win over Slovakia in the Euro 1996 qualifiers, but could not be part of the final tournament squad due to an injury.

== After retirement ==
After his retirement, Timofte opened a restaurant and a hotel in Timișoara, both called Boavista.

He was president in the early 2000s at UM Timișoara when the team managed to earn promotion to the first league. In March 2014 he was appointed as president at ACS Poli Timișoara, a position he held for about a year. In 2016 he was appointed sporting director at Boavista. In 2019 he became a counselor at ASU Politehnica Timișoara.

== Career statistics ==
Appearances and goals by national team and year
National team	Year	Apps	Goals
Romania	1991	6	1
Romania	1992	1	0
Romania	1995	3	0
Total		10	1

Scores and results list Romania's goal tally first, score column indicates score after each Timofte goal.

List of international goals scored by Ion Timofte
No.	Date	Venue	Opponent	Score	Result	Competition
1	17 April 1991	Estadio Príncipe Felipe, Cáceres, Spain	Spain	1–0	2–0	Friendly

== Honours ==
Porto

- Primeira Divisão: 1991–92, 1992–93
- Taça de Portugal: 1993–94
- Supertaça Cândido de Oliveira: 1991, 1993

Boavista

- Taça de Portugal: 1996–97
- Supertaça Cândido de Oliveira: 1997
