= 1991 Supertaça Cândido de Oliveira =

- Event: Supertaça Cândido de Oliveira (Portuguese Super Cup)
Benfica	Porto
1	1
- Porto won the replay 5–4 on penalties, after 2–2 aggregate score over the two legs.

First leg
Benfica	Porto
2	1
- Date: 18 December 1991
- Venue: Estádio da Luz, Lisbon
- Referee: José Pratas (Évora)

Second leg
Porto	Benfica
1	0
- Date: 29 January 1992
- Venue: Estádio das Antas, Porto
- Referee: Bento Marques (Évora)

The 1991 Supertaça Cândido de Oliveira was the 13th edition of the Supertaça Cândido de Oliveira, the annual Portuguese football season-opening match contested by the winners of the previous season's top league and cup competitions (or cup runner-up in case the league- and cup-winning club is the same). The 1991 Supertaça Cândido de Oliveira was contested over two legs, and opposed Benfica and Porto of the Primeira Liga. Benfica qualified for the SuperCup by winning the 1990–91 Primeira Divisão, whilst Porto qualified for the Supertaça by winning the 1990–91 Taça de Portugal.

The first leg which took place at the Estádio da Luz, saw Benfica defeat Porto 2–1 as a result of a late William goal. The second leg which took place at the Estádio das Antas saw Porto defeat Benfica 1–0 (2–2 on aggregate), which led to the Supertaça being replayed in September 1992. The replay which took place at Estádio Municipal de Coimbra, saw Porto defeat Benfica 4–3 on penalties which would claim Porto a sixth Supertaça.

== First leg ==
=== Details ===
18 December 1991

Benfica	2–1	Porto
Yuran 16'; William 76'		Magalhães 61'

Estádio da Luz, Lisbon
Referee: José Pratas (Évora)

Benfica	Porto

GK	1	(Portugal) Neno
RB	4	(Portugal) Rui Bento	(substituted off) 82'
CB	5	(Portugal) Paulo Madeira
CB	3	(Brazil) William
LB	2	(Portugal) José Carlos
DM	6	(Soviet Union) Vasili Kulkov
RM	7	(Portugal) Vítor Paneira (c)
CM	8	(Sweden) Jonas Thern
LM	10	(Portugal) António Pacheco
CF	9	(Sweden) Mats Magnusson
CF	11	(Soviet Union) Sergei Yuran	(substituted off) 78'
Substitutes:
DF		(Portugal) Pedro Valido	(substituted on) 82'
MF		(Portugal) Rui Costa	(substituted on) 78'
Manager:
(Sweden) Sven-Göran Eriksson

GK	1	(Portugal) Vítor Baía
RB	2	(Portugal) Joaquim Neves
CB	4	(Brazil) Aloísio
CB	5	(Portugal) Fernando Couto
LB	3	(Portugal) Mário Morgado
DM	6	(Portugal) Fernando Bandeirinha
RM	8	(Portugal) Jaime Magalhães (c)
CM	7	(Portugal) Rui Filipe
LM	10	(Portugal) Tozé	(substituted off) 46'
CF	9	(Bulgaria) Emil Kostadinov
CF	11	(Bulgaria) Petar Mihtarski	(substituted off) 58'
Substitutes:
FW		(Portugal) António Folha	(substituted on) 46'
FW		(Portugal) Domingos	(substituted on) 58'
Manager:
(Brazil) Carlos Alberto Silva

Match officials

- Assistant referees:
- Fourth official:

Match rules

- 90 minutes.
- Maximum of two substitutions

== Second leg ==
=== Details ===
29 January 1992

Porto	1–0	Benfica
Timofte 67'

Estádio das Antas, Porto
Referee: Bento Marques (Évora)

Porto	Benfica

GK	1	(Portugal) Vítor Baía
RB	3	(Brazil) Paulo Pereira		(substituted off) 38'
CB	4	(Brazil) Aloísio	Booked
CB	5	(Portugal) Fernando Couto
LB	2	(Portugal) Fernando Bandeirinha
DM	6	(Portugal) António André (c)	Booked
RM	8	(Portugal) Jaime Magalhães
AM	7	(Romania) Ion Timofte	Booked
LM	10	(Portugal) Tozé
CF	11	(Bulgaria) Emil Kostadinov
CF	9	(Portugal) Domingos		(substituted off) 60'
Substitutes:
DF		(Portugal) João Pinto		(substituted on) 60'
DF	13	(Czech Republic) Lubomír Vlk		(substituted on) 38'
Manager:
(Brazil) Carlos Alberto Silva

GK	1	(Portugal) Silvino
RB	4	(Portugal) Rui Bento
CB	5	(Portugal) Paulo Madeira	Booked
CB	3	(Brazil) William
LB	2	(Portugal) António Veloso (c)
DM	6	(Russia) Vasili Kulkov
CM	7	(Portugal) Vítor Paneira	(yellow card) (yellow-red card) 26'
CM	8	(Sweden) Jonas Thern		(substituted off) 46'
RW	11	(Brazil) Isaías
LW	10	(Portugal) César Brito
CF	9	(Russia) Sergei Yuran		(substituted off) 80'
Substitutes:
DF		(Portugal) José Carlos	Booked	(substituted on) 46'
MF		(Portugal) Paulo Sousa		(substituted on) 80'
Manager:
(Sweden) Sven-Göran Eriksson

Match officials

- Assistant referees:
- Fourth official:

Match rules

- 90 minutes.
- Maximum of two substitutions

== Replay ==
=== Details ===
9 September 1992

Benfica	1–1 (a.e.t.)	Porto
Isaías 72'		João Pinto 84'
Penalties
William (penalty scored); Rui Águas (penalty scored); Kulkov (penalty scored); Isaías (penalty missed); Hélder (penalty missed); Mostovoi (penalty missed)	3–4	(penalty missed) João Pinto; (penalty missed) Fernando Couto; (penalty scored) Aloísio; (penalty scored) André; (penalty scored) Antônio Carlos; (penalty scored) Paulinho McLaren

Estádio Municipal de Coimbra, Coimbra
Referee: José Pratas (Évora)

Benfica	Porto

GK	1	(Portugal) Silvino
RB	2	(Portugal) António Veloso (c)
CB	3	(Portugal) Hélder
CB	4	(Portugal) Samuel
CB	5	(Brazil) William
LB	6	(Portugal) Fernando Mendes
RM	7	(Portugal) Vítor Paneira	(substituted off) 82'
AM	11	(Russia) Aleksandr Mostovoi
LM	10	(Portugal) João Pinto	(substituted off) 91'
CF	8	(Brazil) Isaías
CF	9	(Portugal) Rui Águas
Substitutes:
MF		(Portugal) Rui Costa	(substituted on) 91'
MF		(Russia) Vasili Kulkov	(substituted on) 82'
Manager:
(Croatia) Tomislav Ivić

GK	1	(Portugal) Vítor Baía
RB	2	(Portugal) João Pinto (c)
CB	4	(Brazil) Aloísio
CB	5	(Portugal) Fernando Couto
LB	3	(Portugal) Fernando Bandeirinha
DM	8	(Portugal) António André
RM	11	(Portugal) Jaime Magalhães
CM	7	(Portugal) José Semedo	(substituted off) 61'
CM	6	(Portugal) Rui Filipe
LM	10	(Portugal) Jorge Couto	(substituted off) 79'
CF	9	(Portugal) Domingos
Substitutes:
MF	13	(Brazil) Antônio Carlos	(substituted on) 45'
FW	16	(Brazil) Paulinho McLaren	(substituted on) 65'
Manager:
(Brazil) Carlos Alberto Silva

Match officials

- Assistant referees:
- Fourth official:

Match rules

- 90 minutes.
- 30 minutes of extra time if necessary.
- Penalty shoot-out if scores still level.
- Maximum of two substitutions

1991 Supertaça Cândido de Oliveira Winners
Porto
6th Title

== See also ==
- O Clássico
- 1991–92 Primeira Divisão
- 1991–92 Taça de Portugal
- 2024–25 S.L. Benfica season
