= 1993–94 Taça de Portugal =

Tournament details
- Country: Portugal
- Dates: September 1993 – 10 June 1994

Final positions
- Champions: Porto (8th title)
- Runners-up: Sporting CP

Tournament statistics
- Top goal scorer(s): Krasimir Balakov (6 goals)

The 1993–94 Taça de Portugal was the 55th edition of the Portuguese football knockout tournament, organized by the Portuguese Football Federation (FPF). The 1993–94 Taça de Portugal began in September 1993. The final was played on 5 June 1994 at the Estádio Nacional.

Benfica were the previous holders, having defeated Boavista 5–2 in the previous season's final. Cup holders Benfica were eliminated in the sixth round by Belenenses. Porto defeated Sporting CP, 2–1 in a final that went to a replay as the inaugural match ended goalless. Porto's cup triumph would claim them an eighth Taça de Portugal. As a result of Porto winning the domestic cup competition, the Portistas faced 1993–94 Primeira Divisão winners Benfica in the 1994 Supertaça Cândido de Oliveira.

== Sixth round ==
Ties were played on the 30 January. Due to the odd number of teams involved at this stage of the competition, Desportivo das Aves qualified for the quarter-finals due to having no opponent to face at this stage of the competition.

30 January 1994	Belenenses (I)	2–1	Benfica (I)	Estádio do Restelo, Lisbon
			Pinto 6'	Referee: Vítor Pereira

30 January 1994	Chaves (II)	0–1	Lusitânia Lourosa (III)	Estádio Municipal de Chaves, Chaves

30 January 1994	Famalicão (II)	1–3	Estrela da Amadora (I)	Estádio Municipal 22 de Junho, Vila Nova de Famalicão

30 January 1994	Rio Ave (II)	2–1	Sporting de Espinho (II)	Estádio do Rio Ave FC, Vila do Conde

30 January 1994	Salgueiros (I)	0–2	Porto (I)	Estádio Engenheiro Vidal Pinheiro, Paranhos
			Maciel 18' (o.g.); Kostadinov 34'

30 January 1994	Tirsense (II)	0–2	Trofense (IV)	Estádio Abel Alves de Figueiredo, Santo Tirso

30 January 1994	Vitória de Setúbal (I)	0–0	Sporting CP (I)	Estádio do Bonfim, Setúbal

9 February 1994 Replay	Sporting CP (I)	2–1	Vitória de Setúbal (I)	Estádio José Alvalade, Lisbon
	Balakov 21'; Cadete 39'		Sessay 77'

== Quarter-finals ==
Ties were played on the 15 February.

15 February 1994	Lusitânia Lourosa (III)	2–0	Belenenses (I)	Estádio do Lusitânia de Lourosa FC, Lourosa

15 February 1994	Rio Ave (II)	0–3	Estrela da Amadora (I)	Estádio do Rio Ave FC, Vila do Conde

15 February 1994	Porto (I)	6–0	Desportivo das Aves (II)	Estádio das Antas, Porto
	Timofte 27'; Costa 32'; Domingos 71', 81'; Rui Filipe 78', 87'			Referee: Pinto Correia

15 February 1994	Sporting CP (I)	3–1	Trofense (IV)	Estádio José Alvalade, Lisbon
	Capucho 29'; Yordanov 52'; Porfírio 88'		Jó 13'	Referee: Fortunato Azevedo

== Semi-finals ==
Ties were played on 2 April.

2 April 1994	Estrela da Amadora (I)	1–2	Porto (I)	Estádio José Gomes, Amadora
	Fernando 90' (pen.)		Timofte 27'; Drulović 65' (pen.)	Referee: Fortunato Azevedo

2 April 1994	Sporting CP (I)	6–0	Lusitânia Lourosa (III)	Estádio José Alvalade, Lisbon
	Balakov 33', 39', 65', 72' (pen.), 79' (pen.); Juskowiak 84'

== Final ==
5 June 1994
17:00 CEST

Porto	0–0 (a.e.t.)	Sporting CP

Estádio Nacional, Oeiras
Referee: Fortunato Azevedo (Braga)

=== Replay ===
10 June 1994
17:00 CEST

Porto	2–1 (a.e.t.)	Sporting CP
Rui Jorge 35'; Aloísio 91'		Vujačić 55'

Estádio Nacional, Oeiras
Referee: José Pratas (Évora)
