= Rui Correia (footballer, born 1990) =

Portuguese footballer

Personal information
- Full name: Rui Jorge Farto Correia
- Date of birth: 23 August 1990 (age 36)
- Place of birth: Chaves, Portugal
- Height: 1.88 m (6 ft 2 in)
- Position: Centre-back

Team information
- Current team: Seixal 1925

Youth career
- 1998–2009: Seixal

Senior career*
| Years | Team | Apps | (Gls) |
| 2009–2010 | Zambujalense | 14 | (3) |
| 2010 | Amora | 0 | (0) |
| 2010–2012 | Sesimbra | 45 | (0) |
| 2012–2013 | Fabril | 30 | (3) |
| 2013–2014 | Portimonense | 35 | (3) |
| 2014–2017 | Nacional | 73 | (5) |
| 2017–2019 | Paços Ferreira | 13 | (0) |
| 2019–2022 | Nacional | 46 | (4) |
| 2022–2023 | Estrela Amadora | 25 | (0) |
| 2023–2024 | Belenenses | 18 | (0) |
| 2025 | Sintrense | 6 | (0) |
| 2025– | Seixal 1925 | 11 | (5) |
- * Club domestic league appearances and goals as of 00:23, 13 January 2026 (UTC)

Rui Jorge Farto Correia (born 23 August 1990) is a Portuguese professional footballer who plays as a central defender for Seixal Clube 1925.

== Club career ==
Born in Chaves, Correia played youth football with Seixal FC. Until the age of 22 he competed in the lower leagues, signing with Portimonense S.C. from the Segunda Liga in the summer of 2013.

Correia joined Primeira Liga club C.D. Nacional for the 2014–15 season, after agreeing to a four-year contract. He made his debut in the tournament on 17 August 2014, playing the full 90 minutes in a 0–1 home loss against Moreirense FC.

Correia scored a career-best five goals in the 2015–16 campaign, helping the Madeirans finish in 11th position.

== Personal life ==
Correia's father, Manuel, was also a footballer and a defender.
