= Joaquim Neves =

Portuguese footballer

Personal information
- Full name: Joaquim da Silva Neves
- Date of birth: 24 December 1970 (age 55)
- Place of birth: Santo Tirso, Portugal
- Height: 1.76 m (5 ft 9 1/2 in)
- Position: Defender

Youth career
- 1987–1988: Aves

Senior career*
Years	Team	Apps	(Gls)
1988–1991	Aves	63	(6)
1991–1999	FC Porto	9	(0)
1993–1994	→Sporting Braga (loan)	13	(1)
1994–1995	→Gil Vicente (loan)	29	(2)
1995–1996	→Belenenses (loan)	25	(1)
1996–1997	→Marítimo (loan)	29	(2)
1998–1999	→Chaves (loan)	19	(0)
1999–2001	Salgueiros	53	(1)
2001–2005	Aves	108	(5)

International career
1996	Portugal	2	(0)
- * Club domestic league appearances and goals

Joaquim da Silva Neves (born 24 December 1970) is a former Portuguese footballer who played as a defender.

== Honours ==
- Taça de Portugal: 1997–98
- Supertaça Cândido de Oliveira: 1991
