= São João da Madeira =

- Municipality
- City of São João da Madeira
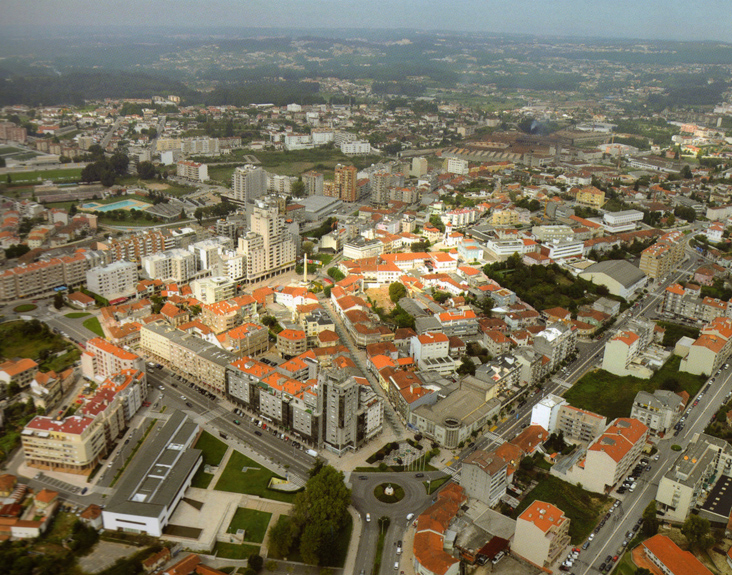
- View of São João da Madeira

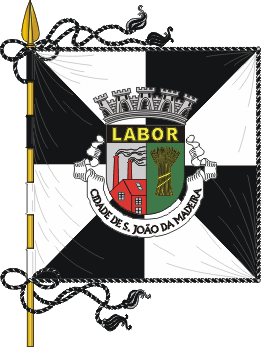
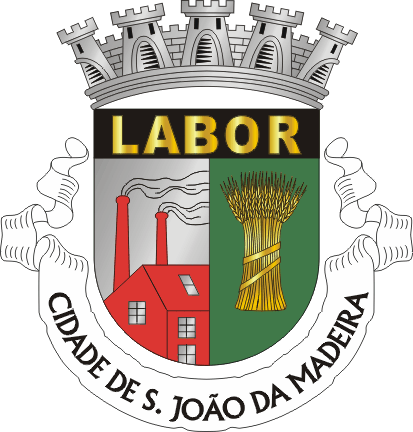
- Flag Coat of arms
- Interactive map of São João da Madeira
- Coordinates: 40°53′50″N 8°29′20″W
- Country: Portugal
- Region: Norte
- Metropolitan area: Porto
- District: Aveiro
- Parishes: 1

Government
  - President: Jorge Vultos Sequeira (PS)

Area
  - Total: 7.94 km^{2} (3.07 sq mi)
- Elevation: 227 m (745 ft)

Population (2011)
  - Total: 21,713
  - Density: 2,730/km^{2} (7,080/sq mi)
- Time zone: UTC+00:00 (WET)
  - Summer (DST): UTC+01:00 (WEST)
- Postal code: 3700
- Area code: 256
- Patron: São João Baptista
- Website: http://www.cm-sjm.pt/

São João da Madeira (Portuguese pronunciation: [sɐ̃w ʒuˈɐ̃w dɐ mɐˈðɐjɾɐ]), officially the City of São João da Madeira (Portuguese: Cidade de S. João da Madeira), is a city and a municipality in northwestern region of the Portuguese Norte region. It is part of the larger Porto Metropolitan Area, located 30 km from central Porto. The population in 2011 was 21,713. With an area of 7.94 km^{2}, it is the smallest municipality in Portugal. In 2010, the city was distinguished in Portuguese quality of life studies as the "Best Municipality to Live In".

São João da Madeira stood out also recently by introducing in 2011 the Industrial Tourism in Portugal and, in 2012, becoming the first Portuguese municipality to offer almost integral wireless coverage in its municipal area.

São João da Madeira is also known as the capital city of the shoes, due to the fact that there is the so-called shoe museum there.

== History ==
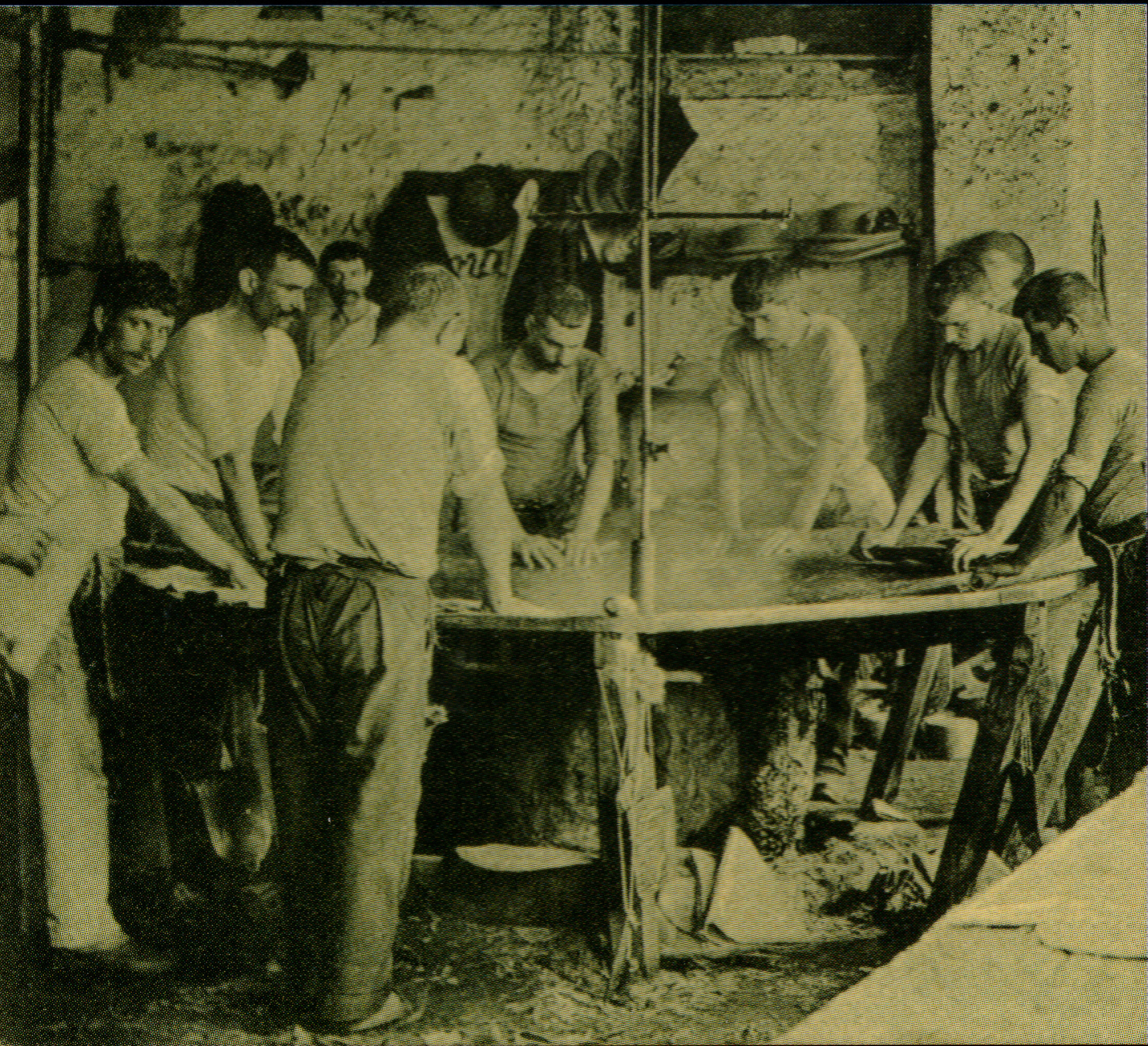
The Unhas Negras workers of the felt industry, immortalized by João da Silva Correia

The origins of São João da Madeira extend back to the consecutive settlements by Celt, Roman, Moors and Visigoths. Yet, historically the first mention of São João occurred in 1088: the first reference was the phrase Uilla de Sancto Ioanne de Mateira, that appeared in the sale of lands in the territory. The designation of "Madeira" that appeared was in reference to the abundance of trees and forest, that continued to exist in the region.

In the 19th century, São João da Madeira registered an intense growth, the fruit of commercial and industrial development linked to the manufacture of hats and dairy industry. J. Gomes de Pinho was the first empressario to establish a hat factory in 1802, but it was António José de Oliveira Júnior, an ex-functionary who would drive the local industry with his establishment in 1892 of the first fur hat factory. It would eventually become one of the major symbols of São João da Madeira's new economy, the Empresa Industrial de Chapelaria Lda. Totally mechanized by the early 19th century, it would become the largest factory in the Iberian Peninsula by the end of the 19th century. Oliveira Júnior was recognized by the national government, who issued him a diploma of Industrial and Agricultural Merit, its citizens later honouring him with a bust and the naming of one of its roads. The prosperity that developed, also supported by the nacscent growth of the footwear industry, allowed the growth of a dynamic centre that attracted more inhabitants with the possibility of work.

With progress and modernization there was a radical alteration in the architecture of the community. The primitive church was demolished in 1883, and the following year the new temple was blessed and inaugurated (11 July 1888).

In 1908 King Manuel II of Portugal inaugurated the Caminho de Ferro do Vale do Vouga (Vouga Valley Railline) which, along with the construction of new streets and roads allowed the parallel growth of the region. With the construction of the local hospital, the introduction of electricity into the region was finally concluded, while at the same time the cultural arena was enhanced with the establishment of the Grupo Patriótico Sanjoanense a philharmonic band and cultural centre (led by the Jesuit priest and histographer Serafim Leite).

It was not until 11 October 1926 that the region achieved both economic and political autonomy as a full municipality, a fact that was seen by locals as enviable due to its inferior status administratively (until then it was a civil parish of the neighbouring municipality of Oliveira de Azeméis). Its independence was recorded in the local newspaper O Regional as born "of a group of young people with blood that boiled in their veins and anxious for the constant progress of São João da Madeira". At that time, the Portuguese government considered São João da Madeira one of the most important regional industrial centres with its progress suffocated by its inferior status. São João da Madeira became a city at 28 June 1984, by the law n.º 13/84.

By the second World War, the felt industry grew in Portugal, and during the 1940s the production of fur and felt production was centralized in the factories of the municipality, with the establishment of the Cortadoria Nacional do Pêlo, which was nationalized in 1945. In 1946, 1775 people worked in the hat-making industrial in Portugal, while 1212 were located in São João da Madeira. The activity of this industry was later immortalized by João da Silva Correia, in his romance "Unhas Negras", a pejorative reference to the works who worked the open cauldrons that darken and destroyed their fingernails (unhas negras literally means "darken/blacken fingernails"). The term was later generally used to identify the citizenry of the municipality. The use of the word "Labor", on the coat-of-arms of the municipality, was intended to signify the importance of these workers in the development of the region. Regardless, the hat-making industries slowly declined in the following decades, with the decline in the use of hats, and the shoe-making industry grew in importance, resulting in its reference as the "Capital of Footwear" in Portugal (Portuguese: Capital do Calçado).

== Geography ==
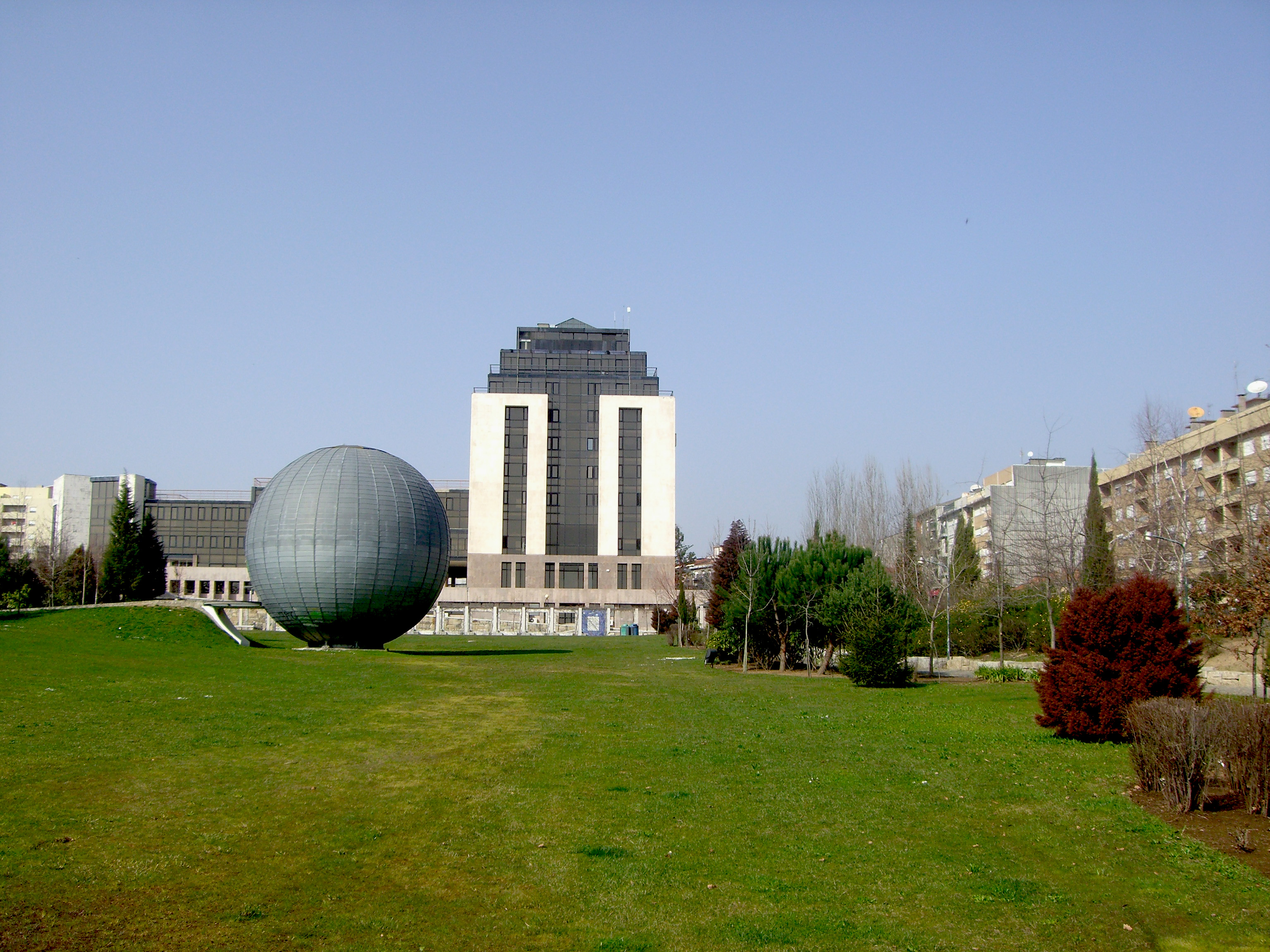
The Municipal Garden and Forum, along the Avenida da Liberdade

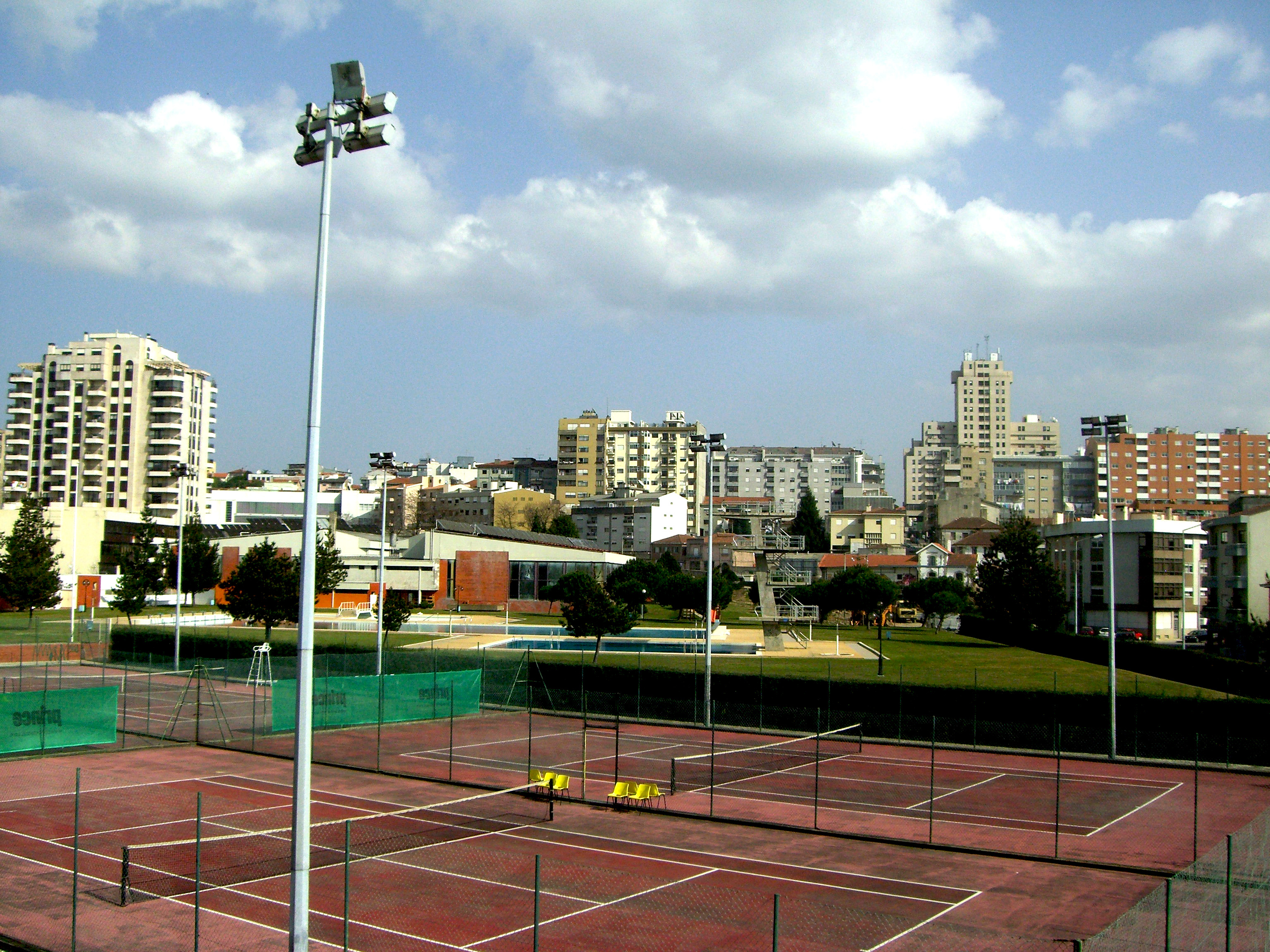
The built-up landscape of São João da Madeira, as seen from the Complexo de Piscinas

The municipality of São João da Madeira is situated in the extreme north of the district of Aveiro, in the historical region of Beira Litoral, occupying a position central in the subregion of Entre Douro e Vouga. It is approximately 18 kilometres from the Portuguese Atlantic coast, 32 kilometres from the regional capital of Porto, 40 kilometres from Aveiro and 275 kilometres from the national capital. It straddles the a hilltop portion of the geomorphological massif that extends from 50 to 400 metres above sea level. It is crossed at its farthest limit by the River Ul, which runs north to south.

The climate in this region is maritime in character, with heavy winter rainfall countered by short dry summers.

It is limited in the north by the civil parish of Milheirós de Poiares and west by Arrifana (both in the municipality of Santa Maria da Feira), while its southern border aligns with the civil parishes of Cucujães and São Roque and eastern frontier with Nogueira do Cravo and Macieira de Sarnes (in the municipality of Oliveira de Azeméis).

São João da Madeira is a rare example of a municipality with only one civil parish (Portuguese: freguesia). Apart from its small dimensions, São João da Madeira is the second largest city in the district of Aveiro and the largest in the Entre Douro e Vouga subregion.

== Demographics ==
Historical population

| Year | Pop. | ±% |
|---|---|---|
| 1864 | 2,221 | — |
| 1878 | 2,363 | +6.4% |
| 1890 | 2,876 | +21.7% |
| 1900 | 3,115 | +8.3% |
| 1911 | 3,954 | +26.9% |
| 1920 | 4,407 | +11.5% |
| 1930 | 5,481 | +24.4% |
| 1940 | 7,424 | +35.4% |

| Year | Pop. | ±% |
|---|---|---|
| 1950 | 9,266 | +24.8% |
| 1960 | 11,921 | +28.7% |
| 1970 | 14,195 | +19.1% |
| 1981 | 16,444 | +15.8% |
| 1991 | 18,452 | +12.2% |
| 2001 | 21,102 | +14.4% |
| 2011 | 21,713 | +2.9% |
| 2021 | 22,143 | +2.0% |

Source: INE

== Economy ==
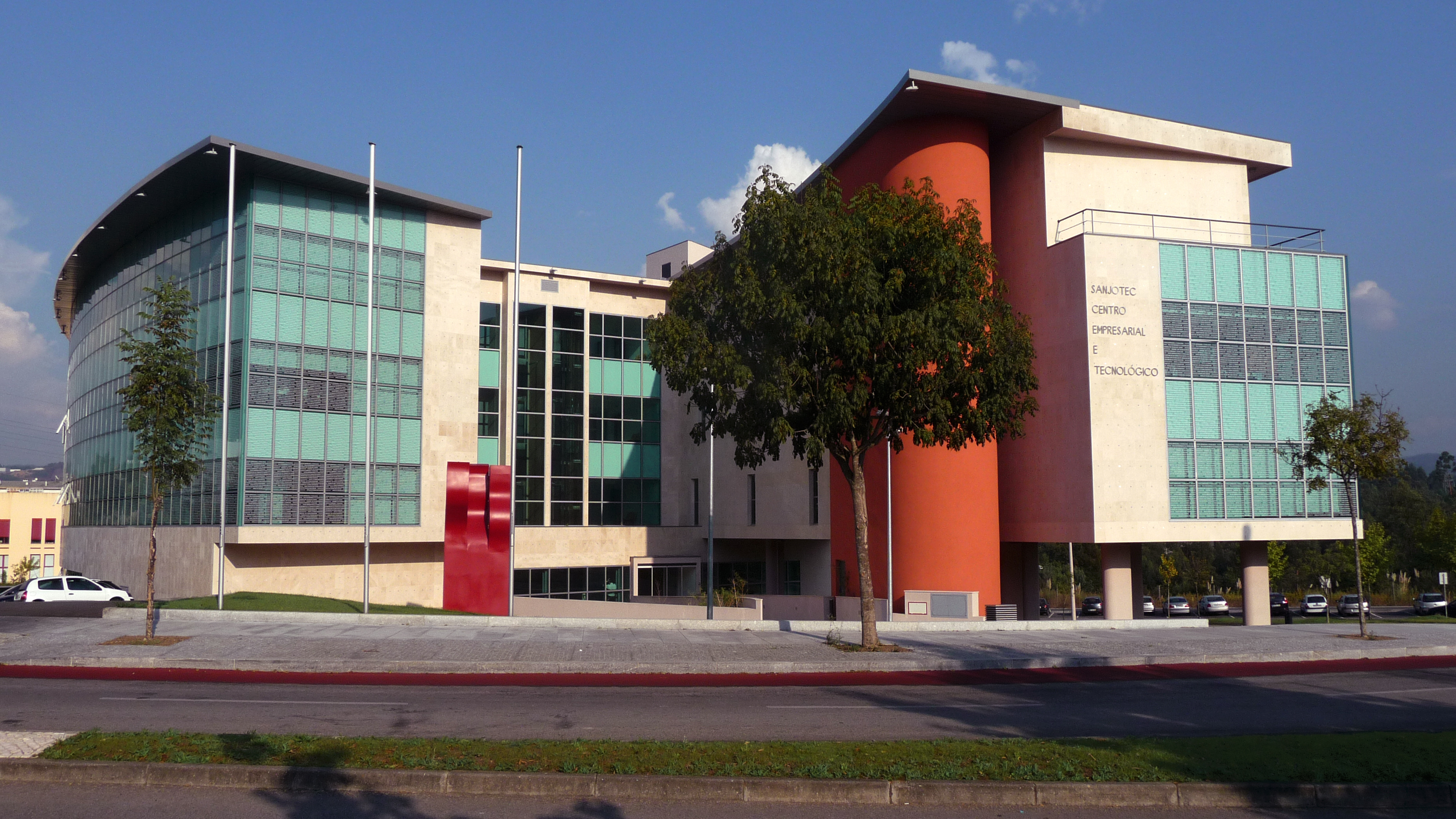
The Centro Empresarial e Tecnológico business incubator for technological innovation in the region

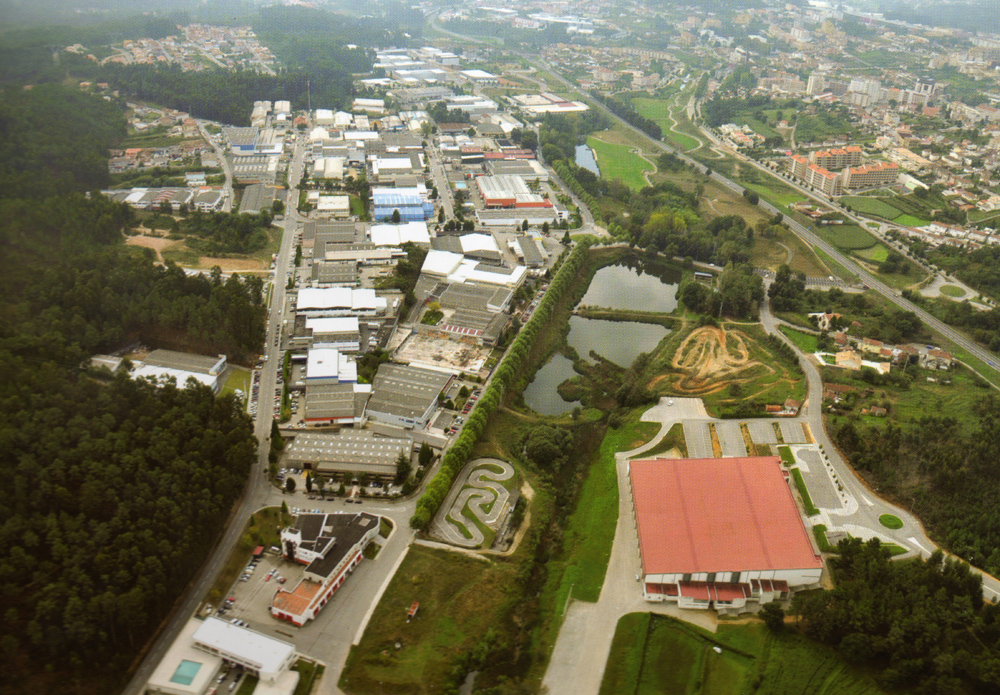
The Travessas Industrial Zone, a modern agglomeration of industry and business incubator

Its economy is based on services and industry, employing 62% in secondary and 38% in tertiary sectors. In 2007, there were 3660 registered companies dominated by micro and small businesses and employing 74% of the workers. São João da Madeira's motto, translated as "Labor, City of Work", appeals to its industrial history.

In 2007, there were 3660 companies in São João da Madeira: despite being the smallest municipality in size in Portugal, it is the twentieth in economic turnover. It is the head of shoe industry in Portugal, an important industrial activity in Portugal, having the seat of the Shoe Technological Centre. Beyond that, the city is developing a Science Park and main Centro Empresarial e Tecnológico (Business and Technology Centre), as well as important commercial, financial and service centre of the region, having its largest Shopping Mall and largest concentration of banks. Inaugurated in 2008 by President Aníbal Cavaco Silva the centre is a modern project by architect Filipe Oliveira Dias, that services as an incubator for high technology businesses in order to diversify the local market. It is actually the first of ten buildings in the zone, of a planned 80,000 square metre technological park, including the Núcleo de Investigação e Desenvolvimento (Investigation and Development Nucleus). In 2009, a series of protocols of understanding were signed to establish a regional network of "Innovation and Competitivity" between business and education, in order to foster technological innovation.

Shoe manufacturing has been one of the city's main economic industries, and regularly, the city has been referred to as "a Capital do Calçado" (the Capital of Footwear); many of Portugal's shoe manufacturers and ancillary businesses, including the Centro Tecnológico do Calçado (Footwear Technology Centre) and Centro de Formação Profissional da Indústria do Calçado (Footwear Industry Centre for Professional Learning) are based in São João da Madeira. Similarly, regional industries have been responsible for the production of 20% the world's felt hats and continues to be the major national producer. The quality of São João da Madeira's head apparel has, at one time, been recognized internationally, and incorporated in fashion house (such as Hermès). In addition, the movie industry was responsible for supporting this industry, with headwear produced for films such as Public Enemies,Indiana Jones and the Kingdom of the Crystal Skull (Indiana Jones' hat, for example) and the Mad Hatter's famous hat in Alice in Wonderland. Other secondary industries in the economy include automobile components, industrial textiles, mattresses, glues and tubing manufacturing, which are concentrated in four industrial zones: Travessas, Orreiro, Devesa-Velha e Oliva.

Its central place within the urban hierarchy has slowly consolidated many of the main services of the Entre Douro e Vouga subregion; along with Santa Maria da Feira it has contributed to the policentralizism of Greater Porto basin. São João da Madeira is an important banking and financial centre; in 2007, there were 1288 employed in the banking sector, equivalent to the same number in Aveiro.

== Tourism ==
Industrial tourism has increased, and S. João da Madeira was the first city in the country to introduce this tourism.

The routes include the only pencil factory in operation in Portugal, the shoe and headwear industry.

A Vocational Training Centre of the Footwear Industry and the Portuguese Technological Footwear Centre are part of this industrial tourism route, as well as the Hat Museum, one symbol of the city and unique in the Iberian Peninsula.

== Architecture ==
=== Civic ===
- (Old) Municipal Hall (Portuguese: Antigo Paços do Concelho/Paços da Cultura)
- Adães Bermudes Primary School (Portuguese: Escola Primária Adães Bermuda/Academia de Música de São João da Madeira)
- Building of the (Old) Welfare Fund (Portuguese: Edifício da antiga Caixa de Providência/Escola Nacional de Estudos e Formação da Inspecção do Trabalho)
- Building of the Correios, Telégrafos e Telefones, CTT (Portuguese: Edifício dos Correios, Telégrafos e Telefones, CTT)
- Carqueijo Primary School and Kindergarten (Portuguese: Escola Primária e Jardim de Infância de Carqueijo)
- Casaldelo Primary School (Portuguese: Escola Primária de Casaldelo)
- Conde Dias Garcia Primary School (Portuguese: Escola Primária Conde Dias Garcia)
- Dr. Renato Araújo Municipal Library (Portuguese: Biblioteca Municipal Dr. Renato Araújo)
- Emperor Theatre (Portuguese: Cine-Teatro Imperador/Casa de Artes e de Criatividade)
- Estate of São João da Madeira (Portuguese: Casa da Quinta do Morgado/Quinta dos Gafanhões/Quinta de São João da Madeira)
- Fountain of the (Old) Praça das Vendas (Portuguese: Fontanário da Antiga Praça das Vendas/Chafariz da Praça)
- Hat-making Museum (Portuguese: Empresa Industrial de Chapelaria/Museu de Chapelaria)
- Oliva Factory (Portuguese: Fábrica Oliva)
- Residence of Santo António (Portuguese: Casal de Santo António)
- Santo Filomena Children's College (Portuguese: Colégio Conde Dias Garcia/Colégio Infantil Santa Filomena)
- São João da Madeira Railway Station (Portuguese: Estação Ferroviária de São João da Madeira)

=== Religious ===
- Chapel of Santa Maria de Casaldelo (Portuguese: Capela de Santa Maria de Casaldelo)
- Chapel of Nossa Senhora dos Milagres (Portuguese: Capela de Nossa Senhora dos Milagres/Capela do Parque)
- Chapel of Santo António (Portuguese: Capela de Santo António)
- Church of São João Baptista (Portuguese: Igreja Paroquial de São João da Madeira/Igreja de São João Baptista)
- Mausoleum of the Laranjeira Family (Portuguese: Jazigo da Família Laranjeira)

== Notable people ==
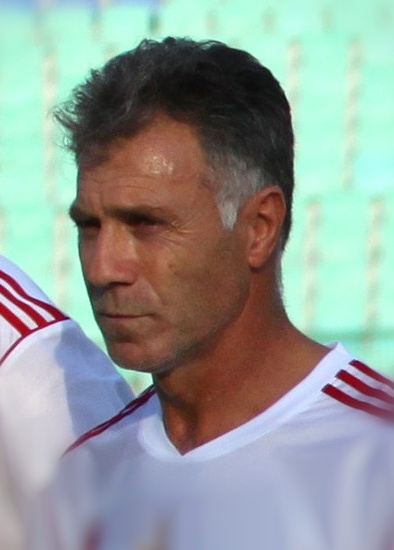
Antonio Veloso, 2011

- António Sousa (born 1957) a Portuguese football manager and former player with 598 club caps and 27 with Portugal
- António Veloso (born 1957) a Portuguese former footballer with 502 club caps and 40 with Portugal
- Carlos Manuel Oliveiros da Silva (born 1959), known as Vermelhinho, a Portuguese former footballer with 265 club caps and 2 for Portugal
- Rui Correia (born 1967) a Portuguese former football goalkeeper with 403 club caps
- Carlos Secretário (born 1970) a Portuguese former professional footballer with 407 club caps and 35 with Portugal
- José Sousa (born 1977) a Portuguese football manager and former player with 234 club caps
- Ricardo Sousa (born 1979) a Portuguese football manager and former player with 277 club caps
