= Tozé (footballer, born 1965) =

Portuguese footballer

Personal information
- Full name: António José Alves Ribeiro
- Date of birth: 4 September 1965 (age 61)
- Place of birth: Amarante, Portugal
- Height: 1.77 m (5 ft 10 in)
- Position: Forward

Youth career
- 1981–1984: Penafiel

Senior career*
Years	Team	Apps	(Gls)
1984–1987	Penafiel	81	(8)
1987–1988	Vitória Guimarães	20	(1)
1988–1990	Marítimo	46	(1)
1990–1991	Beira-Mar	37	(2)
1991–1993	Porto	31	(1)
1993–1994	Gil Vicente	17	(2)
1994–1997	Farense	77	(4)
1997–1998	Gil Vicente	21	(0)
Total		330	(19)

International career
1985–1986	Portugal U21	4	(0)
1991	Portugal	1	(0)
- * Club domestic league appearances and goals

António José Alves Ribeiro (born 4 September 1965 in Amarante, Porto District), known as Tozé, is a Portuguese retired footballer who played as a forward.
