= The Welder =

2023 American indie horror film

- Promotional release poster
- Directed by: David Liz
- Written by: David Liz; Manuel Delgadillo
- Starring: Vincent De Paul; Camila Rodríguez; Roe Dunkley
- Release dates: August 15, 2021 (Popcorn Frights); February 24, 2023
- Running time: 86 minutes
- Country: United States
- Language: English

The Welder is a 2021 American horror film directed and cowritten by David Liz and Manuel Delgadillo. The plot follows an interracial couple on vacation at a ranch near the Everglades, who encounter a former surgeon intent on conducting grisly racial experiments.

The film premiered on digital platforms on February 24, 2023.

== Plot ==
Eliza, a former army medic, suffers from debilitating nightmares and sleepwalking episodes. Her boyfriend, Roe, books a weekend getaway at a remote ranch near the Everglades, hoping to help her de‑stress. Upon arrival, they meet the ranch's owner, William Godwin, and his creepy handyman Don. Soon they learn that William, a former surgeon, is conducting grotesque experiments in racial "reconstruction", trying to fuse body parts of different races to create a new hybrid being. As Eliza and Roe find out the truth, they become targets of William’s deranged mission to end racial hatred. The film ends with a climactic confrontation that reveals the grotesque fruits of his labor.

== Cast ==
- Camila Rodríguez as Eliza, a Latina former army medic
- Roe Dunkley as Roe Sterling, Eliza's boyfriend
- Vincent De Paul as William Godwin
- Anthony Vazquez as Duke Godwin, the local deputy
- Cristian Howard as Don
- Jorge Pico as Uber Driver
- Matt The Welder as Tyler's friends

== Reception ==
Jim Morazzini of Nerdly gave a largely negative review, stating that despite effective atmosphere-building early on, the film unravels due to "ridiculous" methods and "a horribly muddled message." He noted that while the cinematography and sound design are commendable, the plot's racial commentary is "way off target," and the ending, along with a mid‑credits scene, only adds to the film's shortcomings. Morazzini concluded that "The Welder aspires to be classed with Get Out, but it gets a 'nope' from us."

Matthew C. Dupée of Rue Morgue offered a similarly critical assessment, opening his review with a welding metaphor: "The Welder" directed by David Liz falls victim to its own burn-through, from a preposterous premise to its flawed execution, the film curdles its noble intention of taking on social ills like racism and mental health issues.Dupée detailed the film's narrative shortcomings, noting that Godwin's backstory and experiments are poorly explained and that a late twist involving his brother Duke "destroys any logic about being a hate-filled puritan racist." He also criticized Vincent De Paul's performance as "wooden" and the plot's logic, questioning how an Army medic could perform surgical "welding" procedures. However, Dupée singled out the chemistry between Rodríguez and Dunkley as the film's "brightest spot," describing them as "a believable cinematic couple who do their best with the otherwise uninspiring material." He concluded by echoing Roe's own lament in the film: "Skip this one and head to the beach instead.

== Awards ==
- 2021 – International Premiere, Raindance Film Festival
- 2021 – Best Actress (Camila Rodríguez), New York City Horror Film Festival
- 2021 – Best Actor (Roe Dunkley), New York City Horror Film Festival

== See also ==
- Race in horror films
- Black horror
