= Gabriel Gervino =

Argentine footballer

Personal information
- Full name: Gabriel Alejandro Gervino
- Date of birth: 25 October 1964 (age 62)
- Place of birth: Santa Fe, Argentina
- Height: 1.80 m (5 ft 11 in)
- Position: Midfielder

Senior career*
Years	Team	Apps	(Gls)
1989–1990	Argentinos Juniors		
1990–1991	El Porvenir		
1991–1992	Portimonense		
1992–1998	União de Leiria		
1998–2000	Paços de Ferreira	49	(2)
2000–2001	Olhanense	28	(3)
2001–2002	Marinhense		
2002–2003	Caranguejeira		
- * Club domestic league appearances and goals

Gabriel Alejandro Gervino (born 25 October 1964) is an Argentine former professional footballer who played as a midfielder. He played three seasons and 70 games in the Primeira Liga for União de Leiria.

== Career ==
Gervino made his Primeira Liga debut for União de Leiria on 21 August 1994 as a starter in a 2–1 loss to União da Madeira.
