= Dinda =

Brazilian footballer (born 1972)

Personal information
- Full name: Jailton dos Santos
- Date of birth: 18 August 1972 (age 54)
- Place of birth: Pedra Branca, Brazil
- Height: 1.72 m (5 ft 8 in)
- Position: Midfielder

Senior career*
Years	Team	Apps	(Gls)
1991	Náutico		
1992–1993	Confiança		
1993	Sport		
1993–1995	União de Leiria	3	(1)
1995–1996	Paços de Ferreira	32	(5)
1996–1997	Académica de Coimbra	32	(3)
1997–2001	União de Leiria	116	(22)
2001–2004	Marítimo	42	(7)
2005–2007	Guarany de Sobral		
2008	Murici		
2008	Vitória das Tabocas		
2008	Vera Cruz		
2009	Belo Jardim		
2009	Vitória		
- * Club domestic league appearances and goals

Jailton dos Santos, known as Dinda (born 18 August 1972) is a Brazilian former professional footballer who played as a midfielder.

He played eight seasons and 129 games (scoring 19 goals) in the Primeira Liga for União de Leiria and Marítimo.

== Career ==
Dinda made his Primeira Liga debut for União de Leiria on 26 March 1995 as a late substitute in a 5–1 victory over Farense.
