= Alberto Argibay (football manager) =

Spanish football manager (born 1965)

Personal information
- Full name: Alberto Argibay Pazos
- Date of birth: 16 January 1965 (age 61)
- Place of birth: Pontevedra, Spain

Managerial career
- Years: Team
- 1992: Alondras
- 1993: Portonovo
- 1993–1994: Endesa As Pontes
- 1997–1998: Braga (assistant)
- 1998: Braga
- 1999–2000: Ourense
- 2001: Farense
- 2002–2003: Alicante
- 2005–2007: Pontevedra
- 2007: Marítimo
- 2021–2022: Lerez (youth)

Alberto Argibay Pazos (born 16 January 1965), known in Spain as Alberto Argibay and in Portugal as Alberto Pazos, is a Spanish former football manager.

Having managed as high as the Segunda División for Pontevedra in Spain, he led Braga, Farense and C.S. Marítimo in brief spells in Portugal's Primeira Liga. He was Braga's manager as they lost the Taça de Portugal final in 1998.

== Career ==
Born in Pontevedra in Galicia, Pazos managed several small clubs in his native region before moving to S.C. Braga of the Portuguese Primeira Liga as an assistant to compatriot Fernando Castro Santos. He succeeded the latter for the second half of the 1997–98 season, losing the Taça de Portugal final 3–1 to FC Porto.

In 2001, Argibay was hired at S.C. Farense. He was fired on 27 November with the team three points above the relegation zone, despite winning his last match 1–0 against S.C. Beira-Mar.

Argibay returned to Spain to manage Alicante CF of the Segunda División B in 2002–03. On 6 November, his team defeated La Liga title holders Valencia CF – managed by his friend Rafael Benítez – on penalties in the Copa del Rey.

In 2004, during a break in his career, Argibay watched a Portuguese second tier game involving C.D. Feirense and recommended their forward Charles for Pontevedra CF. The Brazilian went on to play for over a decade in Spain, including for RC Celta de Vigo.

Argibay was hired by Pontevedra in January 2005, after replacing José Aurelio Gay. In June, despite relegation from the Segunda División, his contract was extended for another year. The team reached the playoffs in 2006, losing to Sevilla Atlético. President Nino Mirón sacked him at 2 a.m. on 22 March 2007, hours after defeating Ontinyent CF to reach the Copa Federación final; his replacement with ten games to go was Javi Gracia, who had only ever managed Villarreal CF's youth team.

On 8 April 2007, Argibay returned to Portugal's top flight on a contract of undisclosed length at 9th-placed C.S. Marítimo. He earned the team two points from the remaining six games of the season.

Argibay founded ICD Consulting, involved in football agency and investment in the game. In June 2015 his company was interested in buying Real Avilés Industrial CF, until the club was unexpectedly relegated to the Tercera División.

== Personal life ==
In the 2019 Spanish local elections, Argibay joined En Marea as a consultant on sporting issues.
