= Manuel Correia (footballer) =

Portuguese footballer (born 1962)

Personal information
- Full name: Manuel Afonso Correia
- Date of birth: 26 February 1962 (age 64)
- Place of birth: Seixal, Portugal
- Height: 1.82 m (6 ft 0 in)
- Position: Centre-back

Youth career
- 1974–1975: Seixal
- 1977–1978: Sporting CP
- 1978–1979: Seixal

Senior career*
Years	Team	Apps	(Gls)
1979–1981	Seixal		
1981–1983	Sesimbra	27	(1)
1983–1984	O Elvas	29	(3)
1984–1987	Vizela	86	(1)
1987–1989	Penafiel	76	(0)
1989–1996	Chaves	226	(8)
Total		444	(13)

Managerial career
- 1992: Chaves (interim)
- 1996–1997: Chaves (assistant)
- 1997–1998: Chaves
- 1998–2001: União Lamas
- 2001: Penafiel
- 2001–2002: União Lamas
- 2002–2003: Felgueiras
- 2003–2004: Chaves
- 2004–2005: Aves
- 2005: Ovarense
- 2006: Vizela
- 2011–2012: Sesimbra
- 2012–2017: Fabril
- 2018: Oriental Dragon
- * Club domestic league appearances and goals

Manuel Afonso Correia (born 26 February 1962) is a Portuguese former professional footballer who played as a central defender. He worked as a manager after retiring.

== Career ==
Born in Seixal, Setúbal District, Correia appeared in 299 Primeira Liga matches over nine seasons, scoring a total of nine goals for F.C. Vizela and G.D. Chaves and also representing F.C. Penafiel. He made his debut in the competition on 26 August 1984 whilst at the service of the first club, in a 1–2 home loss against S.L. Benfica.

Correia retired at the end of the 1995–96 campaign at the age of 34, after helping Chaves to retain their top-division status. He subsequently worked as a manager, being in charge of several teams in the Segunda Liga.

== Personal life ==
Correia's son, Rui, was also a footballer and a defender.
