= Reinaldo (footballer, born 1965) =

Portuguese footballer

Personal information
- Full name: Reinaldo Almeida Lopes da Silva
- Date of birth: 16 January 1965 (age 61)
- Place of birth: Caldas da Rainha, Portugal
- Height: 1.87 m (6 ft 2 in)
- Position: Forward

Senior career*
Years	Team	Apps	(Gls)
1982–1984	Alcobaça		
1984–1990	Académica de Coimbra	140	(28)
1990–1993	Penafiel		
1993–1996	União de Leiria		
1996–1997	Campomaiorense	34	(11)
1997–1999	União de Leiria	56	(18)
1999–2000	Académica de Coimbra	24	(4)
- * Club domestic league appearances and goals

Reinaldo Almeida Lopes da Silva (born 16 January 1965), known as Reinaldo, is a Portuguese former footballer who played as a forward. He played 11 seasons and 231 games (scoring 42 goals) in the Primeira Liga for União de Leiria, Académica de Coimbra, Penafiel and Alcobaça.

== Career ==
Reinaldo made his Primeira Liga debut for Alcobaça on 22 August 1982 as a late substitute in a 1–1 draw against Rio Ave.
