= Vítor Castanheira =

Portuguese footballer

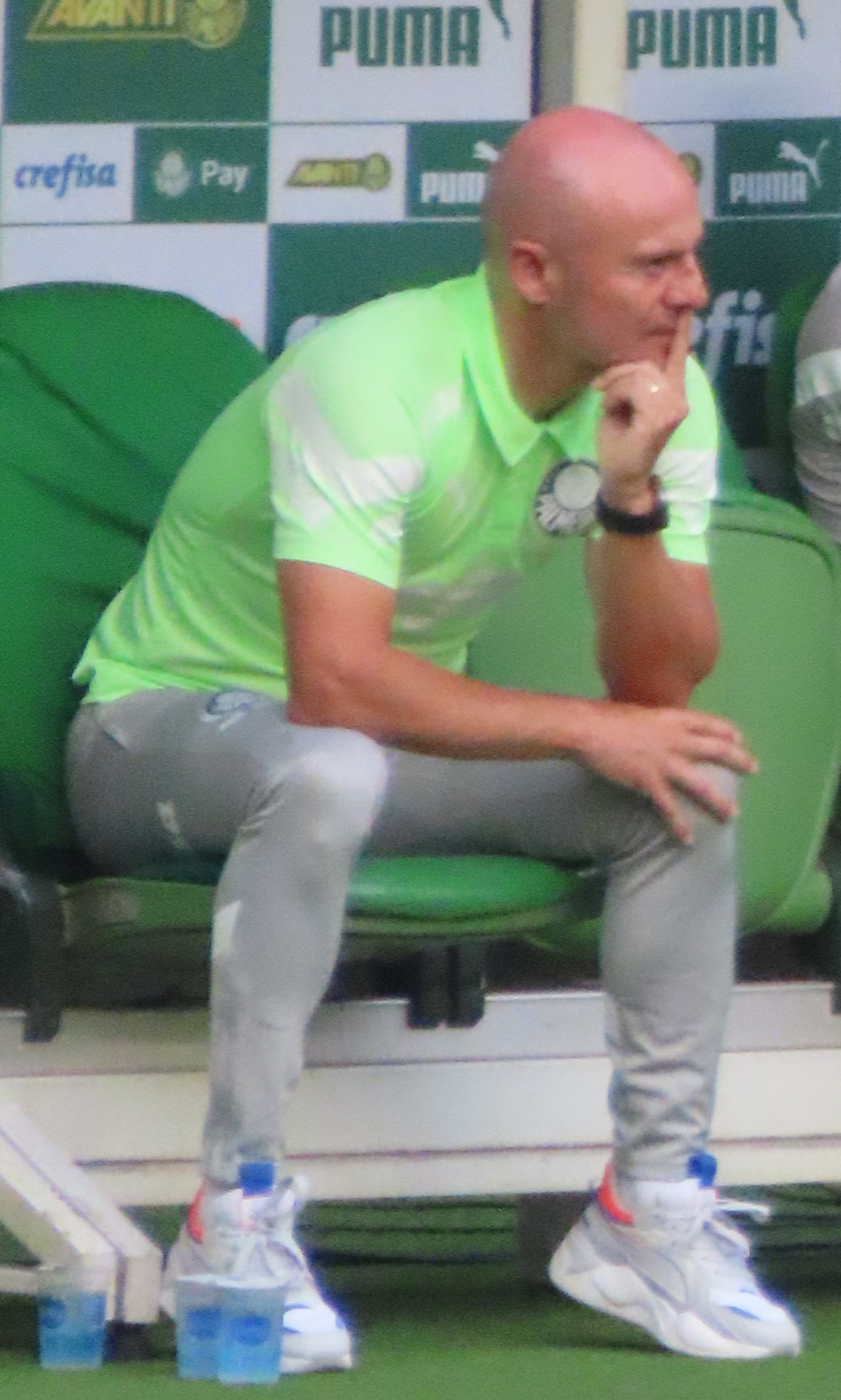
- Castanheira with Palmeiras in 2024

Personal information
- Full name: Vítor Ilídio Castanheira Penas
- Date of birth: 7 September 1977 (age 49)
- Place of birth: Chaves, Portugal
- Height: 1.74 m (5 ft 8 1/2 in)
- Position: Midfielder

Team information
- Current team: Palmeiras (assistant)

Youth career
- 1987–1993: Chaves
- 1993–1996: Braga

Senior career*
Years	Team	Apps	(Gls)
1996–2009	Braga	232	(8)
2000–2004	Braga B	8	(1)
2008	→ Leixões (loan)	7	(1)
2008–2009	→ Leixões (loan)	8	(0)
2009–2010	Chaves	25	(4)
2010–2011	Moreirense	17	(0)
2011–2012	Chaves	28	(5)
2012–2013	Doxa	26	(0)
Total		351	(19)

International career
1994–1995	Portugal U17	6	(1)
1997	Portugal U20	4	(0)
1999–2000	Portugal U21	5	(0)
2002–2003	Portugal U23	2	(0)

Managerial career
- 2013–2017: Braga B (assistant)
- 2017–2019: Braga (assistant)
- 2019–2020: PAOK (assistant)
- 2020-: Palmeiras (assistant)
- * Club domestic league appearances and goals

Vítor Ilídio Castanheira Penas (born 7 September 1977), known as Castanheira, is a Portuguese retired footballer who played as a midfielder, and is the current assistant manager of Palmeiras.

He amassed Primeira Liga totals of 247 games and nine goals over the course of 13 seasons, mainly at the service of Braga (12 years).

== Football career ==
Born in Chaves, Castanheira signed with Braga for the 1996–97 season, and would remain there for over eleven years, always in the Primeira Liga. His spell was a steady one, as he was always counted on by several team coaches, and he was influential when Hungarian Miklós Fehér joined the club in 2000–01, providing ten assists as the striker scored 14 goals; he also served as co-captain during his stay.

Castanheira was a relatively important part of the squad that finished in fourth place in 2005–06, appearing in 17 league matches (no goals). Braga nearly missed out on qualification to the UEFA Champions League, and progressed through to the round-of-16 in the following campaign's UEFA Cup.

In January 2008, as his importance in the team was gradually diminishing, he was loaned to top division promotees Leixões, until the end of the season. The move was extended for the following campaign, after the Matosinhos side retained their league status on the very last matchday.

Castanheira was rarely used by Leixões in the 2008–09 season, and was released by Braga at its closure. He returned to youth club Chaves after 18 years, with it now in the second level of Portuguese football – in a relegation-ending season. He signed with another team in division two shortly after, newly promoted Moreirense.

Aged nearly 35, Castanheira moved abroad for the first time, joining several compatriots at Cypriot club Doxa Katokopias. He retired the following year, immediately being appointed as assistant coach at Braga B.
