= João Manuel Pinto =

Portuguese football manager and former player

João Pinto
Personal information
- Full name: João Manuel Pinto Tomé Santos
- Date of birth: 26 May 1973 (age 53)
- Place of birth: Carcavelos, Portugal
- Height: 1.85 m (6 ft 1 in)
- Position: Centre-back

Youth career
- 1986–1988: Chelas
- 1988–1989: Olivais
- 1989–1990: Oriental

Senior career*
Years	Team	Apps	(Gls)
1990–1991	Oriental	25	(3)
1991–1992	Campomaiorense	37	(3)
1992–1995	Belenenses	68	(7)
1995–2001	Porto	75	(9)
2001–2003	Benfica	48	(4)
2003–2004	Ciudad Murcia	11	(1)
2004–2007	Sion	84	(4)
Total		348	(31)

International career
1993–1996	Portugal U21	3	(0)
2002	Portugal	1	(0)

Managerial career
- 2013: Cinfães
- 2017: Moncarapachense
- 2017–2018: Lusitano
- 2018: Sertanense
- 2020: Vila Real
- 2020–2021: Quarteirense
- 2021–2022: Moura
- 2022–2023: Machico
- 2023: Dacia Unirea Brăila
- 2023–2024: Atlético Reguengos
- 2024: Cartaxo
- 2025: Macedo Cavaleiros
- * Club domestic league appearances and goals

João Manuel Pinto Tomé Santos (born 26 May 1973), known as João Pinto or João Manuel Pinto, is a Portuguese former professional footballer who played as a central defender. He is currently a manager.

== Playing career ==
Pinto was born in Carcavelos, Cascais. During his career he represented Clube Oriental de Lisboa, S.C. Campomaiorense, C.F. Os Belenenses, FC Porto and S.L. Benfica, retiring in 2007 after abroad stints with Ciudad de Murcia (Spanish Segunda División) and FC Sion (Swiss Super League). In his country's Primeira Liga, he amassed totals of 191 games and 20 goals over the course of ten seasons.

Used often as a last-minute centre-forward when his teams were trailing– he scored 12 competitive goals for Porto – Pinto appeared once for the Portugal national side, coming on at half-time in the 1–1 friendly draw against England at Villa Park, on 7 September 2002.

== Coaching career ==
Pinto started his managerial career in the summer of 2013, going on to be in charge of C.D. Cinfães in the third tier for only three months. On 23 December 2015, he was appointed academy director of Brazilian club Associação Portuguesa de Desportos.

In the following seasons, Pinto led several teams in the Portuguese lower leagues. On 16 October 2022, his A.D. Machico ousted top-flight Boavista F.C. from the Taça de Portugal with a 1–0 home win in the third round.

On 12 January 2023, Pinto signed for Romanian Liga III side AFC Dacia Unirea Brăila, leaving in March for 'personal reasons' without having coached a single match. In July, he took charge of Portuguese amateurs Atlético Reguengos.

== Honours ==
Porto

- Primeira Liga: 1995–96, 1996–97, 1997–98, 1998–99
- Taça de Portugal: 1997–98, 1999–2000
- Supertaça Cândido de Oliveira: 1996, 1998

Sion

- Swiss Cup: 2005–06
