= Estádio Adelino Ribeiro Novo =

Multi-use stadium in Barcelos, Portugal

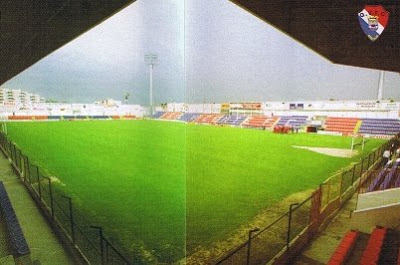
- Interactive map of Estádio Adelino Ribeiro Novo
- Location: Barcelos, Portugal
- Coordinates: 41.532962°N 8.610855°W
- Owner: Gil Vicente F.C.
- Capacity: 8,500
- Surface: Grass
- Field size: 105 x 65 metres

Construction
- Opened: 1933
- Closed: May 2004
- Demolished: October 2025

Tenants
- Gil Vicente F.C. (1933–2004); Gil Vicente youth (2004–2024)

Estádio Adelino Ribeiro Novo was a football stadium in Barcelos, Portugal. It was used mostly for football matches and hosted the home matches of Gil Vicente F.C. The stadium was able to hold 8,500 people.

In 2004, Gil Vicente started playing in the new Estádio Cidade de Barcelos, using Estádio Adelino Ribeiro Novo only for training, friendly games and youth squads.

On October 9, 2025, demolition work began on the sports venue, which had been inactive for about a year, following the construction of the new football academy. In its place, right in the city center, a new health center for the population will be built.
