= Paulo Lino =

Portuguese footballer

Lino
Personal information
- Full name: Paulo Rui Lino Borges
- Date of birth: 21 July 1971 (age 55)
- Place of birth: Mirandela, Portugal
- Height: 1.80 m (5 ft 11 in)
- Position: Left-back

Youth career
- 1986–1988: Mirandela

Senior career*
| Years | Team | Apps | (Gls) |
| 1988–1995 | Chaves | | |
| 1995 | Porto | 0 | (0) |
| 1996 | Braga | 10 | (1) |
| 1996–1997 | Sporting de Espinho | 31 | (1) |
| 1997–2000 | Braga | 76 | (1) |
| 2000–2004 | Chaves | 84 | (1) |
- * Club domestic league appearances and goals

Paulo Rui Lino Borges (born 21 July 1971), known as Lino, is a Portuguese former professional footballer who played as a left-back. He played nine seasons and 225 games in the Primeira Liga for Chaves, Braga and Sporting de Espinho.

== Career ==
Lino made his Primeira Liga debut for Chaves on 30 September 1990 as a starter in a 1–1 draw against Vitória de Setúbal.
