= Welder (footballer) =

Brazilian footballer (born 1969)

Personal information
- Full name: Welder Ferreira da Cruz
- Date of birth: 24 December 1969 (age 56)
- Place of birth: Guarapari, Brazil
- Height: 1.69 m (5 ft 6 1/2 in)
- Position: Forward

Senior career*
Years	Team	Apps	(Gls)
1989–1994	Desportiva Ferroviária		
1995	Vitória		
1995–1997	Famalicão	46	(16)
1997–1999	Beira-Mar	51	(10)
1999–2000	Varzim	32	(10)
2000–2001	Marco	33	(13)
2001–2003	Leça	60	(9)
2003–2004	União de Lamas	29	(7)
2005	Estrela do Norte		
- * Club domestic league appearances and goals

Welder Ferreira da Cruz, known as Welder (born 24 December 1969) is a former Brazilian football player.

== Club career ==
He made his Primeira Liga debut for Beira-Mar on 21 August 1998 in a game against Braga.

== Honours ==
Beira-Mar

- Taça de Portugal: 1998–99
