= Zé Nuno Azevedo =

Portuguese football manager and former player

Personal information
- Full name: José Nuno Freire de Silva Azevedo
- Date of birth: 19 July 1969 (age 57)
- Place of birth: Paranhos, Portugal
- Height: 1.70 m (5 ft 7 in)
- Position: Right back

Team information
- Current team: Prado (manager)

Youth career
- 1982−1985: Sporting da Cruz
- 1985−1987: Porto

Senior career*
| Years | Team | Apps | (Gls) |
| 1987−1988 | União Lamas | 36 | (2) |
| 1988−1989 | Famalicão | | |
| 1989−1992 | Gil Vicente | 87 | (2) |
| 1992−2003 | Braga | 274 | (7) |
| 1999−2002 | Braga B | 13 | (0) |
| Total | | 410 | (11) |

International career
| 1989 | Portugal U21 | 1 | (0) |

Managerial career
- 2004–2005: Braga (youth)
- 2010–2011: Prado
- 2011–2012: Leixões (assistant)
- 2012–2013: Braga B (assistant)
- 2013: Vilaverdense
- 2016–2017: Gondomar B
- 2017–: Prado
- * Club domestic league appearances and goals

José 'Zé' Nuno Freire de Silva Azevedo (born 19 July 1969) is a Portuguese former footballer who played as a right back and is the manager of Grupo Desportivo Prado.

== Club career ==
Born in Paranhos (Porto), Azevedo started his professional career with C.F. União de Lamas in the Segunda Liga, joining amateurs F.C. Famalicão one year later and eventually catching the eye of Gil Vicente F.C. also of the second level, signing in 1989.

After three seasons in Barcelos, Azevedo joined S.C. Braga where he would see out his career, often being an undisputed starter and retiring at the age of 34.
