= Mário Reis (footballer) =

Portuguese footballer

Personal information
- Full name: Mário Domingos da Silva Reis
- Date of birth: 25 June 1947 (age 79)
- Place of birth: Porto, Portugal
- Position: Midfielder

Youth career
- 1957–1967: Salgueiros

Senior career*
Years	Team	Apps	(Gls)
1967–1977	Salgueiros		
1977–1982	Rio Ave		

Managerial career
- 1979–1980: Rio Ave
- 1984–1985: Rio Ave
- 1986: Rio Ave
- 1987: Aves
- 1988: Lusitânia Lourosa
- 1988: Rio Ave
- 1988–1989: Gil Vicente
- 1989–1990: Felgueiras
- 1990–1991: Rio Ave
- 1991–1993: Felgueiras
- 1993–1996: Salgueiros
- 1996: Vitória Setúbal
- 1997: Boavista
- 1998: Felgueiras
- 1998–1999: Leiria
- 2000–2002: Maia
- 2002: Leiria
- 2003: Gil Vicente
- 2004: Marco
- 2004–2005: Maia
- 2005–2006: Santa Clara
- * Club domestic league appearances and goals

Mário Domingos da Silva Reis (born 25 June 1947) is a retired Portuguese footballer and manager.

His playing career as a midfielder was spent mostly at Salgueiros before ending at Rio Ave, where he transitioned into a manager. He led both clubs in the Primeira Liga, as well as Vitória Setúbal, Boavista, União Leiria and Gil Vicente, totalling 241 games in the top division. In 1997, he won the Taça de Portugal and Supertaça Cândido de Oliveira for Boavista.

== Career ==
Reis was born in Paranhos, a parish in the north of Porto. His father Joaquim was a handball coach for local Salgueiros. Reis played football for Salgueiros between the ages of 9 and 29 before moving to Rio Ave, where his managerial career began as a player-manager in the absence of regular coaches. He returned to Salgueiros as manager in 1993, where he gave debuts to players including Ricardo Sá Pinto and Tulipa.

In the 1996–97 season, Zoran Filipović left during the campaign and Reis succeeded him at Boavista. His side, with Jimmy Floyd Hasselbaink and Nuno Gomes up front and Erwin Sánchez in midfield, defeated Sporting CP in the Taça de Portugal semi-finals and then Benfica in the final. The goals in the final were scored by Sánchez (two) and Gomes, who had already agreed to transfer to the opponents; Reis loudly reminded the pair before the game, in sight of their future teammates, that they were still Boavista players. Boavista followed up by winning the 1997 Supertaça Cândido de Oliveira 2–1 on aggregate over city rivals FC Porto.

Reis was the manager of União de Leiria for the entire 1998–99 Primeira Divisão season and returned to the club in January 2002, when José Mourinho left for Porto. Reis won on his debut and lost his remaining four games before resigning on 25 February, accusing some players of indiscipline.

After a previous spell in 1988–89, Reis returned to Gil Vicente in 2003. He was sacked on 11 November, after three wins from 11 games left the club in 11th place.

Reis agreed in June 2005 to join second-tier club C.D. Santa Clara, bringing with him former Portugal international Carlos Secretário who had retired at his previous club, Maia. He retired at the end of the season.

In June 2025, Reis was awarded the Medal of Merit by Rui Moreira, mayor of Porto.

== Honours ==
Boavista

- Taça de Portugal: 1996–97
- Supertaça Cândido de Oliveira: 1997
