= Sérgio Abreu (footballer) =

French footballer and manager (born 1967)

Personal information
- Full name: Sérgio Manuel Freitas Abreu
- Date of birth: 16 May 1967 (age 59)
- Place of birth: Bezons, France
- Height: 1.83 m (6 ft 0 in)
- Position: Defender

Senior career*
Years	Team	Apps	(Gls)
1987–1989	Fafe	31	(1)
1989–1991	Tirsense	67	(3)
1991–1999	Braga	187	(6)
1999–2000	Santa Clara	29	(0)
2000–2001	Chaves	20	(0)
2001	Freamunde		
2002–2003	Leixões		
2003–2004	Felgueiras		
2004–2005	Lixa		

Managerial career
- 2004–2006: Lixa
- 2006–2007: Marítimo da Graciosa
- 2007–2008: Tondela
- 2008–2009: Oliveira do Hospital
- 2009–2010: Vieira
- 2010–2011: Portosantense
- 2011: Aljustrelense
- 2012: Guadalupe
- 2013–2014: Vitória do Pico
- * Club domestic league appearances and goals

Sérgio Manuel Freitas Abreu (born 16 May 1967) is a French football manager and a former player who most notably played for Braga.

== Career ==
Abreu made his professional debut in the Primeira Liga for Fafe on 11 September 1988 in a 0–4 loss against Vitória de Setúbal. Over his career he played 314 games on the top level of Portuguese club football.
