= Rui Correia =

Portuguese footballer

Personal information
- Full name: Rui Manuel da Silva Correia
- Date of birth: 22 October 1967 (age 59)
- Place of birth: São João da Madeira, Portugal
- Height: 1.77 m (5 ft 10 in)
- Position: Goalkeeper

Youth career
- 1982–1984: Sanjoanense
- 1984–1986: Sporting CP

Senior career*
Years	Team	Apps	(Gls)
1986–1988	Sporting CP	15	(0)
1988–1991	Vitória Setúbal	1	(0)
1991–1992	Chaves	34	(0)
1992–1997	Braga	158	(0)
1997–2001	Porto	38	(0)
2001–2002	Salgueiros	18	(0)
2002–2005	Feirense	87	(0)
2005–2006	Ovarense	27	(0)
2006–2007	Estoril	25	(0)
Total		403	(0)

International career
1989	Portugal U21	1	(0)
1995–1997	Portugal	2	(0)
- * Club domestic league appearances and goals

Rui Manuel da Silva Correia (born 22 October 1967) is a Portuguese former professional footballer who played as a goalkeeper.

He appeared in 264 Primeira Liga matches over 15 seasons, mainly with Braga.

== Club career ==
Correia was born in São João da Madeira, Aveiro District. In a 21-year senior career, he represented Sporting CP, Vitória de Setúbal, G.D. Chaves, S.C. Braga, FC Porto (winning two Primeira Liga championships and starting most of the games in 1997–98), S.C. Salgueiros, C.D. Feirense, A.D. Ovarense and G.D. Estoril Praia.

Correia retired at the age of 39, after four seasons in the Segunda Liga – and one in the third tier with Feirense– and subsequently joined S.C. Olhanense as its goalkeeping coach. In 2010, he signed with top-flight club Académica de Coimbra in the same capacity.

== International career ==
Correia earned two caps for Portugal and participated at UEFA Euro 1996, being an unused squad member for the quarter-finalists.
