= Mozer =

Portuguese football coach and former player

Personal information
- Full name: Rui Miguel Batista Araújo
- Date of birth: 15 March 1972 (age 54)
- Place of birth: Paranhos, Portugal
- Height: 1.87 m (6 ft 2 in)
- Position: Midfielder

Senior career*
Years	Team	Apps	(Gls)
1991–1993	Pedras Rubras		
1993–1996	Leixões		
1996–2001	Braga	104	(1)
2001–2002	Farense	12	(0)
2002–2006	Rio Ave	98	(3)
2006	Trofense	10	(0)
2007	Vecindario		
2007–2008	Santa Clara	11	(0)
2008–2009	Sporting Covilhã	8	(0)
2009–2010	Rebordosa		
2010–2011	Pedras Rubras		

Managerial career
- 2011: Pedras Rubras
- 2012–2013: Candal
- 2013–2014: Nogueirense
- * Club domestic league appearances and goals

Rui Miguel Batista Araújo, known as Mozer (born 15 March 1972) is a Portuguese football coach and a former player.

He played nine seasons and 194 games in the Primeira Liga for Braga, Rio Ave and Farense.

== Career ==
Mozer made his Primeira Liga debut for Braga on 25 August 1996 as a starter in a 1–1 draw against Benfica.
