= Bruno (footballer, born 1970) =

Portuguese footballer

Personal information
- Full name: Bruno Alexandre da Vaza Ferreira
- Date of birth: 12 October 1970 (age 56)
- Place of birth: Torres Vedras, Portugal
- Height: 1.75 m (5 ft 9 in)
- Position: Midfielder

Senior career*
Years	Team	Apps	(Gls)
1988–1994	Torreense		
1994–2001	Braga	157	(12)
2001–2002	Torreense	1	(0)
- * Club domestic league appearances and goals

Bruno Alexandre da Vaza Ferreira, known as Bruno (born 12 October 1970) is a Portuguese former professional footballer who played as a midfielder, spending most of his career with Braga.

== Career ==
Bruno made his professional debut in the Primeira Liga for Torreense on 18 August 1991 as a starter and scored his team's only goal in a 1–1 draw against Paços de Ferreira. Over his career, he played 172 games on the top level of Portuguese club football.
