= Mladen Karoglan =

Croatian footballer

Personal information
- Date of birth: 6 February 1964 (age 62)
- Place of birth: Imotski, SFR Yugoslavia
- Height: 1.78 m (5 ft 10 in)
- Position: Forward

Senior career*
Years	Team	Apps	(Gls)
1982–1983	Hajduk Split	1	(0)
1983–1988	Iskra Bugojno	31	(1)
1988–1990	Dinamo Vinkovci	49	(9)
1990–1991	NK Zagreb	29	(1)
1991–1993	Chaves	62	(17)
1993–1999	Braga	183	(55)
Total		355	(83)

Managerial career
- 2020: Croatia Zmijavci
- * Club domestic league appearances and goals

Mladen Karoglan (born 6 February 1964) is a Croatian retired football forward, who spent eight seasons playing in Portugal where he had shown his scoring ability.

== Club career ==
Karoglan started as a junior at Hajduk Split and after a spell at Iskra Bugojno, where he played alongside Dražen Ladić, he joined Dinamo Vinkovci. After a season at Zagreb he was lured to Portuguese side Chaves where he formed a strike partnership with Finnish international Kimmo Tarkkio.
