= 1986–87 S.L. Benfica season =

Benfica
1986–87 season
- President: Fernando Martins (until 27 March 1987); João Santos
- Head coach: John Mortimore
- Stadium: Estádio da Luz
- Primeira Divisão: 1st
- Taça de Portugal: Winners
- Cup Winners' Cup: Second round
- Supertaça Cândido de Oliveira: Runners-up
- Top goalscorer: League: Rui Águas (13); All: Rui Águas (20)
Home colours

The 1986–87 season was Sport Lisboa e Benfica's 83rd season in existence and the club's 53rd consecutive season in the top flight of Portuguese football, covering the period from 1 July 1986 to 30 June 1987. Benfica competed domestically in the Primeira Divisão, Taça de Portugal and the Supertaça Cândido de Oliveira, and participated in the Cup Winners' Cup after winning the Taça de Portugal in the previous season.

Following a close-call title race in the past season, Benfica sought to win the title that escaped since 1984. Only small adjustments were made to the squad, a new forward, Chiquinho Carlos, and two new centre-backs, Dito and Edmundo, countered the loss of Nené. Despite a slow start, by early November, Benfica was leading the league by two points after six consecutive wins. A shocking 7–1 defeat to Sporting saw Porto match them in first place, but the team reacted with a 3–1 win against their challengers, bringing back first place isolated. A draw and five wins in a row followed, with Benfica finally securing the title on 24 May, after three consecutive draws that threatened the lead. The season closed with another Taça de Portugal win, the third in a row and the sixth in eight years, therefore completing the double, a feat the club would have to wait nearly 30 years to repeat.

== Season summary ==
Benfica entered the new season trying to recover from the dramatic season finale of the past league, when John Mortimore squandered a two-point lead in the last two match-days, costing Benfica the title. Mortimore remained in charge, but very few changes were made to his roster. A new forward, Chiquinho Carlos, plus two new centre-backs, Dito and Edmundo. On the other end, Nené retired and Michael Manniche nearly left, but was persuaded to do another season. The pre-season began on 9 July with medicals, and the first game was on the 26 with Portimonense, followed by the presentation game of Vitória de Setúbal on 1 August. Afterwards Benfica played two games with Southampton, one in Lisbon and one in England, and competed in the Lisbon International Tournament, winning it. Due to the events occurred in the 1986 Taça de Portugal final, the Portuguese Football Federation punished Benfica with a one-game interdiction of Estádio da Luz. The club selected Estádio Nacional as the alternative for the home reception in match-day two.

Benfica's league campaign started with a Clássico with Porto, which ended with a draw. A win in match-day 2 was followed by another draw. Six consecutive wins propelled Benfica into first place isolated, with two points in hand. In the end of November, Benfica contested the Supertaça with Porto and was defeated by 4–2 at home, after a one-all draw in Antas. On the second week of December, in the Lisbon derby with Sporting, Benfica conceded their largest loss ever in the Primeira Divisão, losing 7–1. Fans reacted with anger towards Mortimore and ripped flags and scarfs with the club image. President Fernando Martins responded with "This was an accident that will not happen in 100 years. I believe that this people that insulted Mortimore will think of him as great in the future". Nonetheless, Benfica closed the year tied in first place with Porto, receiving them in their next home match, on 4 January 1987. With the largest crowd ever in Estádio da Luz, 135 000, saw Rui Águas score a hat-trick for a 3–1 win for Benfica.

Another draw in the following match-day, with Varzim hindered the team progress, but five consecutive wins until day 22 opened a four-point lead to Porto. Benfica managed the difference in the remainder of the campaign, despite three consecutive draws from match-day 26 to 28 that shortened that lead. On 24 May, 125 000 fans witnessed Benfica beat Sporting by a 2–1 and secure their 27th league title. Players chanted: "We do not have the best team, we do not have the best roster, but we won the championship", a clear jab at the team critics. Benfica was not the best attack, or the best defence, but had only lost once and Mortimore was credited for taking everything out an ageing squad in need of renewal.

Earlier in the month, Benfica had progressed to the final of the Taça de Portugal, which they conquered against Sporting, again by 2–1 on 7 June. It was their third consecutive Taça de Portugal win, and the sixth since 1979–80. Despite completing a double, Mortimore departed the club, saying: "I will not stay in a club where are people that do not want me here", allegedly towards new president, João Santos. Benfica had to wait 27 years to win another double, with the streak ending in 2013–14.

== Competitions ==
Win Draw Loss Postponed

=== Overall record ===
Competition	First match	Last match	Record								
Competition	First match	Last match	G	W	D	L	GF	GA	GD	Win %	Source
Primeira Divisão	24 August 1986	31 May 1987	30	20	9	1	51	23	+28	66.67	
Taça de Portugal	23 November 1986	7 June 1987	8	7	1	0	29	3	+26	87.50	
European Cup Winners' Cup	17 September 1986	5 November 1986	4	2	1	1	5	3	+2	50.00	
Supertaça Cândido de Oliveira	19 November 1986	26 November 1986	2	0	1	1	3	5	−2	0.00	
Total			44	29	12	3	88	34	+54	65.91	

=== Supertaça Cândido de Oliveira ===
19 November 1986 First leg	Porto	1–1	Benfica	Porto
19:00	Gomes 32'	Report	Rui Pedro 2'	Stadium: Estádio das Antas; Attendance: 60,000; Referee: Fortunato Azevedo

26 November 1986 Second leg	Benfica	2–4	Porto	Lisbon
20:00	Diamantino 67'; Dito 88'	Report	Madjer 36'; Futre 57', 70'; Gomes 81'	Stadium: Estádio da Luz; Attendance: 70,000; Referee: Carlos Silva Valente

=== Primeira Divisão ===
==== League table ====
Pos	Team	Pld	W	D	L	GF	GA	GD	Pts	Qualification
1	Benfica (C)	30	20	9	1	51	23	+28	49	Qualification to European Cup first round
2	Porto (Note: Porto qualified for the 1987–88 European Cup as the 1986–87 European Cup defending champions.)	30	20	6	4	67	22	+45	46	Qualification to European Cup first round
3	Vitória de Guimarães	30	14	13	3	45	22	+23	41	Qualification to UEFA Cup first round
4	Sporting CP	30	15	8	7	52	28	+24	38	Qualification to Cup Winners' Cup first round
5	Chaves	30	13	7	10	39	38	+1	33	Qualification to UEFA Cup first round

Source: RSSSF
(C) Champions

==== Results by round ====
Round	1	2	3	4	5	6	7	8	9	10	11	12	13	14	15	16	17	18	19	20	21	22	23	24	25	26	27	28	29	30
Ground	A	H	A	H	A	H	H	A	H	A	H	A	H	A	H	H	A	H	A	H	A	A	H	A	H	A	H	A	H	A
Result	D	W	D	W	W	W	W	W	W	D	W	W	W	L	W	W	D	W	W	W	W	W	D	W	W	D	D	D	W	D
Position	8	3	4	3	3	2	2	1	1	2	1	1	1	2	2	1	1	1	1	1	1	1	1	1	1	1	1	1	1	1

Source: ForaDeJogo
A = Away; H = Home; W = Win; D = Draw; L = Loss

==== Matches ====
24 August 1986 1	Porto	2–2	Benfica	Braga
20:30	Fernando Gomes 14'; Juary 63'	Report	Rui Águas 54'; Chiquinho Carlos 86'	Stadium: Estádio 1º de Maio; Attendance: 35,000; Referee: Veiga Trigo

31 August 1986 2	Benfica	2–0	Varzim	Lisbon
19:30	Rui Águas 12'; Chiquinho Carlos 80'	Report		Stadium: Estádio Nacional; Attendance: 20,000; Referee: Santos Ruivo

7 September 1986 3	Marítimo	2–2	Benfica	Funchal
19:00	Colin Hill 20', 63'	Report	Wando 17'; Carlos Manuel 49'	Stadium: Estádio dos Barreiros; Attendance: 30,000; Referee: Carlos Valente

13 September 1986 4	Benfica	1–0	Farense	Lisbon
19:00	Chiquinho Carlos 60'	Report		Stadium: Estádio da Luz; Attendance: 40,000; Referee: José Guedes

21 September 1986 5	O Elvas	0–2	Benfica	Elvas
19:00		Report	Manniche 24'; Nunes 43'	Stadium: Campo Domingos Carrilho Patalino; Attendance: 18,000; Referee: Raúl Ribeiro

27 September 1986 6	Benfica	3–1	Boavista	Lisbon
19:45	Chiquinho Carlos 5'; Nunes 23'; Manniche 44'	Report	Alfredo (yellow card) 0' (yellow-red card) 23'; Tonanha 48' (pen.)	Stadium: Estádio da Luz; Attendance: 40,000; Referee: Fortunato Azevedo

5 October 1986 7	Benfica	1–0	Vitória de Guimarães	Lisbon
19:30	Manniche 52'	Report		Stadium: Estádio da Luz; Attendance: 90,000; Referee: Miranda Dias

19 October 1986 8	Desportivo de Chaves	1–2	Benfica	Chaves
19:00	Radi 41'	Report	Rui Águas 26'; Manniche 61'	Stadium: Estádio Municipal de Chaves; Attendance: 20,000; Referee: Francisco Silva

1 November 1986 9	Benfica	3–1	Rio Ave	Lisbon
19:45	Dito 4'; Chiquinho Carlos 22'; Rui Águas 28'	Report	Hernâni 87'	Stadium: Estádio da Luz; Attendance: 30,000; Referee: Azevedo Duarte

9 November 1986 10	Salgueiros	1–1	Benfica	Porto
19:00	Mickey Walsh 39'	Report	Diamantino 54'	Stadium: Estádio Engenheiro Vidal Pinheiro; Attendance: 15,000; Referee: Veiga Trigo

16 November 1986 11	Benfica	2–0	Académica	Lisbon
19:45	Chiquinho Carlos 75'; Diamantino 83'	Report		Stadium: Estádio da Luz; Attendance: 40,000; Referee: Manuel Nogueira

30 November 1986 12	Portimonense	0–3	Benfica	Portimão
19:00		Report	Álvaro 58', 83'; Rui Águas 76'	Stadium: Estádio Municipal de Portimão; Attendance: 18,000; Referee: Ezequiel Feijão

7 December 1986 13	Benfica	2–0	Belenenses	Lisbon
19:00	Rui Águas 28', 73'	Report		Stadium: Estádio da Luz; Attendance: 80,000; Referee: Carlos Esteves

14 December 1986 14	Sporting	7–1	Benfica	Lisbon
21:00	Mário Jorge 15', 68'; Meade 65'; Manuel Fernandes 50', 71', 82', 86'	Report	Wando 59'	Stadium: Estádio de Alvalade; Attendance: 60,000; Referee: Vítor Correia

28 December 1986 15	Benfica	2–1	Braga	Lisbon
19:00	Abreu 17' (o.g.); Nunes 71'	Report	Vítor Santos 41'	Stadium: Estádio da Luz; Attendance: 40,000; Referee: Francisco Silva

4 January 1987 16	Benfica	3–1	Porto	Lisbon
20:00	Rui Águas 2', 45', 51'	Report	Fernando Gomes 15'	Stadium: Estádio da Luz; Attendance: 135,000; Referee: Carlos Valente

10 January 1987 17	Varzim	0–0	Benfica	Póvoa de Varzim
19:00		Report		Stadium: Estádio do Varzim SC; Attendance: 12,000; Referee: Miranda Dias

25 January 1987 18	Benfica	3–1	Marítimo	Lisbon
19:00	Carlos Manuel 2'; Nunes 53'; Rui Águas 78'	Report	Eldon 55'	Stadium: Estádio da Luz; Attendance: 40,000; Referee: Heliodoro Saraiva

1 February 1987 19	Farense	0–2	Benfica	Faro
19:15		Report	Nunes 17', 34'	Stadium: Estádio de São Luís; Attendance: 15,000; Referee: Carlos Valente

22 February 1987 20	Benfica	2–0	O Elvas	Lisbon
19:45	Manniche 1' (pen.); Nunes 70'	Report		Stadium: Estádio da Luz; Attendance: 35,000; Referee: Azevedo Duarte

1 March 1987 21	Boavista	0–2	Benfica	Porto
19:00		Report	Diamantino 21'; Tueba 46'	Stadium: Estádio do Bessa; Attendance: 30,000; Referee: Raúl Ribeiro

14 March 1987 22	Vitória de Guimarães	1–2	Benfica	Guimarães
19:00	Paulinho Cascavel 65'	Report	Edmundo 13'; Chiquinho Carlos 46'	Stadium: Estádio D. Afonso Henriques; Attendance: 30,000; Referee: Carlos Valente

22 March 1987 23	Benfica	0–0	Desportivo de Chaves	Lisbon
20:00		Report		Stadium: Estádio da Luz; Attendance: 50,000; Referee: Veiga Trigo

3 April 1987 24	Rio Ave	0–2	Benfica	Vila do Conde
19:00		Report	Rui Águas 8'; Edmundo 58'	Stadium: Estádio dos Arcos; Attendance: 25,000; Referee: Francisco Silva

12 April 1987 25	Benfica	1–0	Salgueiros	Lisbon
19:30	Rui Águas 65'	Report		Stadium: Estádio da Luz; Attendance: 45,000; Referee: Francisco Caroço

26 April 1987 26	Académica	0–0	Benfica	Coimbra
19:00		Report		Stadium: Estádio Municipal de Coimbra; Attendance: 30,000; Referee: Fortunato Azevedo

3 May 1987 27	Benfica	1–1	Portimonense	Lisbon
20:00	Diamantino 54'	Report	Luciano 23'	Stadium: Estádio da Luz; Attendance: 60,000; Referee: Fernando Alberto

17 May 1987 28	Belenenses	1–1	Benfica	Lisbon
19:30	Mapuata 76'	Report	Chiquinho Carlos 55'	Stadium: Estádio do Restelo; Attendance: 30,000; Referee: Veiga Trigo

24 May 1987 29	Benfica	2–1	Sporting	Lisbon
20:00	Chiquinho Carlos 17'; Nunes 25'	Report	Mário Jorge 70'	Stadium: Estádio da Luz; Attendance: 120,000; Referee: Vítor Correia

31 May 1987 30	Braga	1–1 (Note: The Portuguese Football Federation gave both teams a 3–0 loss after crowd problems. That loss is not reflected in this article statistics.)	Benfica	Braga
19:00	Vinicius 4'	Report	Carlos Manuel 23'	Stadium: Estádio 1º de Maio; Attendance: 40,000; Referee: Fernando Alberto

=== Taça de Portugal ===
23 November 1986 Second Rd	Bombarralense	0–3	Benfica	Bombarral
16:00		Report	Wando 34'; Rui Águas 73'; Diamantino 78'	Stadium: Parque de Jogos; Attendance: 10,000; Referee: Francisco Caroço

21 December 1986 Third Rd	Benfica	4–0	União de Santarém	Lisbon
18:00	Manniche 31', 39', 50'; César Brito 68'	Report		Stadium: Estádio da Luz; Attendance: 30,000; Referee: Bento Marques

18 January 1987 Fourth Rd	Cartaxo	0–0	Benfica	Cartaxo
19:00		Report		Stadium: Campo das Pratas; Attendance: 10,000; Referee: José Garcia

21 January 1987 4R Replay	Benfica	7–0	Cartaxo	Lisbon
19:30	Shéu 21', 59'; Chiquinho Carlos 43', 49'; César Brito 66', 75', 81'	Report		Stadium: Estádio da Luz; Attendance: 10,000; Referee: Ezequiel Feijão

8 March 1987 Round of 16	Benfica	6–1	Torreense	Lisbon
19:30	Manniche 27'; Tueba 35'; Chiquinho Carlos 51', 68', 83'; Diamantino 55', 83'	Report	Baltasar 27'	Stadium: Estádio da Luz; Attendance: 30,000; Referee: Santos Ruivo

18 April 1987 Quarter-final	Boavista	1–3	Benfica	Porto
19:30	Phil Walker 31'	Report	Rui Águas 16', 87', 90'	Stadium: Estádio do Bessa; Attendance: 30,000; Referee: Carlos Silva Valente

10 May 1987 Semi-final	Benfica	4–0	Portimonense	Lisbon
20:00	Nunes 34'; Wando 58'; Rui Águas 76', 79'	Report	Luciano 23'	Stadium: Estádio da Luz; Attendance: 60,000; Referee: José Guedes

7 June 1987 Final	Benfica	2–1	Sporting	Oeiras
16:00	Diamantino 39', 55'	Report	Brandão 80'	Stadium: Estádio da Luz; Attendance: 45,000; Referee: Carlos Silva Valente

=== European Cup Winners' Cup ===
==== First round ====
17 September 1986 First leg	Benfica (Portugal)	2–0	(Norway) Lillestrøm	Lisbon
19:45	Manniche 21'; Nunes 54'	Report		Stadium: Estádio da Luz; Attendance: 40,000; Referee: Roger Philippi

1 October 1986 Second leg	Lillestrøm (Norway)	1–2 (1–4 agg.)	(Portugal) Benfica	Oslo
19;45	Sundby 2'	Report	Diamantino 25'; Bjerkeland 76' (o.g.)	Stadium: Ullevaal Stadion; Attendance: 10,000; Referee: Henning Lund-Sørensen

==== Second round ====
22 October 1986 First leg	Benfica (Portugal)	1–1	(France) Bordeaux	Lisbon
19:45	Rui Águas 31'	Report	Vujovic 18'	Stadium: Estádio da Luz; Attendance: 50,000; Referee: Franz Wöhrer

5 November 1986 Second leg	Bordeaux (France)	1–0 (2–1 agg.)	(Portugal) Benfica	Bordeaux
19:45	Vercruysse 46'	Report	Álvaro (yellow card) 5' (yellow-red card) 54'	Stadium: Parc Lescure; Attendance: 25,000; Referee: Karl-Heinz Tritschler

=== Friendlies ===
26 July 1986	Portimonense	0–0	Benfica	Portimão
				Stadium: Estádio Municipal de Portimão; Referee: Francisco Silva

1 August 1986	Vitória de Setúbal	1–3	Benfica	Setúbal
	João Carlos 66'		Chiquinho Carlos 54'; César Brito 64'; Nunes 85'	Stadium: Estádio do Bonfim

5 August 1986	Benfica	2–0	Southampton	Lisbon
	António Oliveira; Nunes			Stadium: Estádio da Luz; Referee: Jorge Coroado

8 August 1986 Lisbon TM	Benfica	3–0	Club Brugge	Lisbon
	Manniche 7'; Rui Águas 73'; Nunes 85'			Stadium: Estádio da Luz; Referee: Jorge Coroado

10 August 1986 Lisbon TM	Sporting	0–2	Benfica	Lisbon
			Manniche 15', 56'	Stadium: Estádio de Alvalade

13 August 1986	Estrela da Amadora	0–2	Benfica	Lisbon
			César Brito 35', 75'	Stadium: Estádio J. Pimenta

16 August 1986 Holmes Test	Southampton	4–1	Benfica	England
	Clarke 21'; Case; Wallace; Holmes		Nunes 8'	Stadium: The Dell

3 September 1986	Benfica	2–0	Belenenses	Lisbon
	Edmundo 23'; Rui Águas 79'			Stadium: Estádio da Luz; Attendance: 30,000; Referee: Vítor Correia

14 January 1987	Benfica	2–1	Anderlecht	Lisbon
	Manniche 5'; Carlos Manuel 64'		Krncevic 37'	Stadium: Estádio da Luz; Referee: Carlos Valente

7 February 1987 Luanda TM	Benfica	1–1 (4-2 p)	Vasco da Gama	Luanda
	Chiquinho Carlos 60'		Romário 65'	Stadium: Estádio da Cidadela; Referee: Manuel Fernandes
	Penalties
	Manniche (penalty missed); José Luís (penalty scored); Rui Águas (penalty scored); Chiquinho Carlos (penalty scored); Carlos Manuel (penalty scored)		(penalty scored) Vivinho; (penalty missed) Geovani; (penalty scored) Dinamite; (penalty missed) Maurícinho

8 February 1987 Luanda TM	Benfica	0–0 (4-5 p)	Petro Luanda	Luanda
				Stadium: Estádio da Cidadela; Referee: Dionísio de Almeida
	Penalties
	Manniche (penalty scored); Rui Águas (penalty scored); Tueba (penalty scored); Oliveira (penalty scored); José Luís (penalty missed); Chiquinho Carlos (penalty missed); Carlos Manuel (penalty missed); César Brito (penalty missed)		(penalty scored) Rasgado; (penalty scored) Avelino; (penalty scored) Lúcio; (penalty scored) Neijo; (penalty scored) Abel

15 February 1987	Benfica	2–0	Steua București	Lisbon
	Manniche 39' (pen.); José Luís 84'			Stadium: Estádio da Luz; Referee: Heliodoro Saraiva

10 June 1987	Toronto Blizzard	1–2	Benfica	Toronto
	Marinaro 3'		Diamantino 34'; Wando 48'	Attendance: 18,000; Referee: John Evangelista

14 June 1987	Vasco da Gama	3–0	Benfica	Newark
				Stadium: Newark Schools Stadium; Attendance: 25,000

16 June 1987	Bermuda	1–5	Benfica	Hamilton
			Nunes; Carlos Manuel; Manniche; Diamantino; José Luís	Stadium: Bermuda National Stadium; Attendance: 25,000

== Player statistics ==
The squad for the season consisted of the players listed in the tables below, as well as staff member John Mortimore (manager), Toni (assistant manager).

Note 1: Note: Flags indicate national team as defined under FIFA eligibility rules. Players may hold more than one non-FIFA nationality.

Note 2: Players with squad numbers marked ‡ joined the club during the 1986-87 season via transfer, with more details in the following section.

No.	Pos	Nat	Player	Total		Primeira Divisão		Taça de Portugal		Cup Winners' Cup		Supertaça	
No.	Pos	Nat	Player	Apps	Goals	Apps	Goals	Apps	Goals	Apps	Goals	Apps	Goals
1	GK	(Portugal) POR	Manuel Bento	1	0	1	0	0	0	0	0	0	0
1	GK	(Portugal) POR	Neno	4	0	1	0	1	0	0	0	2	0
1^{‡}	GK	(Portugal) POR	Silvino	39	0	28	0	7	0	4	0	0	0
2	DF	(Portugal) POR	António Veloso	43	0	30	0	7	0	4	0	2	0
2	DF	(Portugal) POR	José Carlos	1	0	0	0	1	0	0	0	0	0
3	DF	(Portugal) POR	António Oliveira	22	0	15	0	1	0	4	0	2	0
3^{‡}	DF	(Portugal) POR	Dito	40	2	27	1	7	0	4	0	2	1
3	DF	(Portugal) POR	Álvaro Magalhães	42	2	28	2	8	0	4	0	2	0
4	DF	(Portugal) POR	Samuel Quina	13	0	8	0	3	0	0	0	2	0
4^{‡}	DF	(Portugal) POR	Edmundo	23	0	16	0	7	0	0	0	0	0
5	DF	(Portugal) POR	António Bastos Lopes	1	0	0	0	0	0	1	0	0	0
5	DF	(Portugal) POR	Paulo Guilherme	1	0	0	0	1	0	0	0	0	0
6	MF	(Portugal) POR	José Luís	6	0	4	0	2	0	0	0	0	0
6	MF	(Portugal) POR	Carlos Manuel	33	3	23	3	6	0	4	0	0	0
7^{‡}	MF	(Zaire) ZAI	Tueba Menayane	18	2	12	1	6	1	0	0	0	0
7^{‡}	MF	(Brazil) BRA	Chiquinho Carlos	38	14	27	9	6	5	3	0	2	0
7	MF	(Brazil) BRA	Wando	32	4	20	2	8	2	2	0	2	0
8	MF	(Portugal) POR	Adelino Nunes	35	10	24	8	5	1	4	1	2	0
8	FW	(Denmark) DEN	Michael Manniche	24	10	16	5	4	4	3	1	1	0
9	FW	(Portugal) POR	Rui Águas	38	20	27	13	6	6	3	1	2	0
9^{‡}	FW	(Socialist Federal Republic of Yugoslavia) YUG	Zvonko Živkovic	11	0	8	0	0	0	3	0	0	0
10	MF	(Portugal) POR	Rui Pedro	9	1	6	0	1	0	0	0	2	1
11	FW	(Portugal) POR	César Brito	14	4	8	0	4	4	1	0	1	0
11	MF	(Portugal) POR	Diamantino Miranda	39	10	26	4	7	4	4	1	2	1
11	MF	(Portugal) POR	Shéu	35	2	26	0	5	2	4	0	0	0

== Transfers ==
=== In ===
Entry date	Position	Player	From club	Fee	Ref
2 April 1986	MF	Tueba Menayane	Vita Club	Undisclosed	
6 May 1986	MF	Chiquinho Carlos	Flamengo	Undisclosed	
20 June 1986	DF	Dito	Braga	Undisclosed	
20 June 1986	DF	Edmundo	Vitória de Setúbal	Undisclosed	
18 July 1986	GK	Silvino	Aves	Loan return	
26 August 1986	FW	Zvonko Živkovic	Partizan	Undisclosed	

=== Out ===
Exit date	Position	Player	To club	Fee	Ref
5 June 1986	FW	Nené	None	Retired	
10 July 1986	DF	Vítor Duarte	Farense	Undisclosed	

=== Out by loan ===
Exit date	Position	Player	To club	Return date	Ref
16 June 1986	GK	Delgado	Farense	30 June 1987	
10 July 1986	DF	Carlos Pereira	Farense	30 June 1987	
23 July 1986	MF	Luís Simões	Espinho	30 June 1987	
26 July 1986	MF	Paulo Padinha	Portimonense	30 June 1987	
