= 1987 Taça de Portugal final =

- Event: 1986–87 Taça de Portugal
Benfica	Sporting CP
2	1
- Date: 7 June 1987
- Venue: Estádio Nacional, Oeiras
- Referee: Carlos Valente (Setúbal)

The 1987 Taça de Portugal final was the final match of the 1986–87 Taça de Portugal. It was the 47th season of the Taça de Portugal, the premier Portuguese football cup competition organized by the Portuguese Football Federation (FPF). The match was played on 7 June 1987 at the Estádio Nacional in Oeiras, and opposed two Primeira Liga sides: Benfica and Sporting CP. Benfica defeated Sporting CP 2–1 to claim the Taça de Portugal for a twenty first time.

In Portugal, the final was televised live on RTP. As Benfica claimed both league and cup double in the same season, cup runners-up Sporting CP faced their cup final opponents in the 1987 Supertaça Cândido de Oliveira.

== Match ==
=== Details ===
7 June 1987

Benfica	2–1	Sporting CP
Diamantino 39', 55'		Brandão 80'

Estádio Nacional, Oeiras
Referee: Carlos Valente (Setúbal)

Benfica	Sporting CP

GK	1	(Portugal) Silvino
RB	2	(Portugal) António Veloso	(yellow card) 26'
CB	5	(Portugal) Dito
CB	3	(Portugal) Edmundo	(yellow card) 80'
LB	4	(Portugal) Álvaro Magalhães
MF	11	(Portugal) Diamantino Miranda	(yellow card) 81'
MF	10	(Portugal) Shéu (c)
MF	8	(Portugal) Adelino Nunes		(substituted off) 84'
MF	6	(Portugal) Carlos Manuel	(yellow card) 83'
FW	9	(Portugal) Rui Águas
FW	7	(Brazil) Chiquinho Carlos		(substituted off) 42'
Substitutes:
GK	12	(Portugal) Manuel Bento
DF	13	(Portugal) Samuel Quina
MF	14	(Zaire) Tueba Menayane		(substituted on) 84'
FW	15	(Denmark) Michael Manniche
FW	16	(Brazil) Wando		(substituted on) 42'
Manager:
(England) John Mortimore

GK	1	(Portugal) Vítor Damas (c)
DF	5	(Portugal) Virgílio Lopes		(substituted off) 68'
DF	4	(Portugal) Pedro Venâncio
DF	3	(Brazil) Duílio		(substituted off) 73'
DF	2	(Brazil) João Luís
MF	7	(Portugal) Oceano	(yellow card) 59'
MF	6	(Brazil) Mário Marques	(yellow card) 29'
MF	8	(Brazil) Silvinho
FW	9	(Portugal) Manuel Fernandes
FW	11	(England) Raphael Meade
FW	10	(Netherlands) Peter Houtman
Substitutes:
GK	12	(Portugal) Jorge Vital
DF	13	(Portugal) António Morato
MF	14	(Portugal) Mário Jorge		(substituted on) 68'
MF	15	(Portugal) Litos
FW	16	(Brazil) Marlon Brandão		(substituted on) 73'
Manager:
(England) Keith Burkinshaw

1986–87 Taça de Portugal Winners
Benfica
21st Title

Match officials

- Assistant referees:
- Fourth official:

Match rules

- 90 minutes.
- 30 minutes of extra time if necessary.
- Maximum of two substitutions

== See also ==
- Derby de Lisboa
- 1986–87 S.L. Benfica season
