= 1986 Supertaça Cândido de Oliveira =

- Event: Supertaça Cândido de Oliveira (Portuguese Super Cup)
Porto	Benfica
5	3

First leg
Porto	Benfica
1	1
- Date: 19 November 1986
- Venue: Estádio das Antas, Porto
- Referee: Fortunato Azevedo (Braga)

Second leg
Benfica	Porto
2	4
- Date: 26 November 1986
- Venue: Estádio da Luz, Lisbon
- Referee: Carlos Valente (Setúbal)

The 1986 Supertaça Cândido de Oliveira was the 8th edition of the Supertaça Cândido de Oliveira, the annual Portuguese football season-opening match contested by the winners of the previous season's top league and cup competitions (or cup runner-up in case the league- and cup-winning club is the same). The 1986 Supertaça Cândido de Oliveira was contested over two legs, and opposed Benfica and Porto of the Primeira Liga. Porto qualified for the SuperCup by winning the 1985–86 Primeira Divisão, whilst Benfica qualified for the Supertaça by winning the 1985–86 Taça de Portugal.

The first leg which took place at the Estádio das Antas, saw a 1–1 scoreline. The second leg which took place at the Estádio da Luz saw Porto defeat Benfica 4–2 (5–3 on aggregate), which granted the Dragões a fourth Supertaça.

== First leg ==
=== Details ===
19 November 1986

Porto	1–1	Benfica
Gomes 32'		Rui Pedro 2'

Estádio das Antas, Porto
Referee: Fortunato Azevedo (Braga)

Porto	Benfica

GK	1	(Portugal) Zé Beto
DF	(Portugal) João Pinto
DF	(Portugal) Augusto Inácio	(substituted off) 31'
DF	(Brazil) Celso
DF	(Portugal) Eduardo Luís	(yellow card) 39'
MF	(Portugal) Quim	(yellow card) 79'
MF	(Portugal) António André
MF	(Portugal) Jaime Pacheco
FW	(Portugal) Paulo Futre
FW	(Portugal) Jaime Magalhães
FW	9	(Portugal) Fernando Gomes (c)
Substitutes:
MF	(Portugal) António Sousa	(substituted on) 31'
Manager:
(Portugal) Artur Jorge

GK	1	(Portugal) Neno
DF	(Portugal) António Veloso (c)
DF	(Portugal) Álvaro Magalhães
DF	(Portugal) António Oliveira
DF	(Portugal) Dito
MF	(Portugal) Diamantino Miranda
MF	(Portugal) Adelino Nunes
MF	(Portugal) Rui Pedro	(substituted off) 87'
FW	(Denmark) Michael Manniche	(substituted off) 20'
FW	(Brazil) Wando	(yellow card) 82'
FW	(Portugal) Chiquinho Carlos
Substitutes:
DF	(Portugal) Samuel	(substituted on) 87'
FW	(Portugal) Rui Águas	(substituted on) 20'
Manager:
(England) John Mortimore

Match officials

- Assistant referees:
- Fourth official:

Match rules

- 90 minutes.
- Maximum of two substitutions

== Second leg ==
=== Details ===
26 November 1986

Benfica	2–4	Porto
Diamantino 67'; Dito 88'		Madjer 36'; Futre 57', 70'; Gomes 81'

Estádio da Luz, Lisbon
Referee: Carlos Valente (Setúbal)

Benfica	Porto

GK	1	(Portugal) Neno
DF	(Portugal) António Veloso (c)
DF	(Portugal) Álvaro Magalhães
DF	(Portugal) António Oliveira	(substituted off) 64'
DF	(Portugal) Dito
MF	(Portugal) Diamantino Miranda
MF	(Portugal) Adelino Nunes
MF	(Portugal) Rui Pedro
FW	(Portugal) Chiquinho Carlos
FW	(Brazil) Wando	(substituted off) 60'
FW	(Portugal) Rui Águas
Substitutes:
DF	(Portugal) Samuel	(substituted on) 64'
FW	(Portugal) César Brito	(substituted on) 60'
Manager:
(England) John Mortimore

GK	1	(Portugal) Zé Beto
DF	(Brazil) Celso
DF	(Portugal) João Pinto
DF	(Portugal) Eduardo Luís
MF	(Portugal) Jaime Pacheco
MF	(Portugal) António Frasco	(substituted off) 82'
MF	(Portugal) António André
MF	(Portugal) Quim
FW	(Portugal) Paulo Futre
FW	9	(Portugal) Fernando Gomes (c)
FW	(Algeria) Rabah Madjer	(substituted off) 72'
Substitutes:
MF	(Portugal) António Sousa	(substituted on) 72'
MF	(Brazil) Elói	(substituted on) 82'
Manager:
(Portugal) Artur Jorge

Match officials

- Assistant referees:
- Fourth official:

Match rules

- 90 minutes.
- Maximum of two substitutions

1986 Supertaça Cândido de Oliveira Winners
Porto
4th Title

== See also ==
- O Clássico
- 1986–87 Primeira Divisão
- 1986–87 FC Porto season
- 1986–87 S.L. Benfica season
