= 1987 Supertaça Cândido de Oliveira =

- Event: Supertaça Cândido de Oliveira (Portuguese Super Cup)
Benfica	Sporting CP
0	4

First leg
Benfica	Sporting CP
0	3
- Date: 6 December 1987
- Venue: Estádio da Luz, Lisbon
- Referee: Sepa Santos (Lisbon)

Second leg
Sporting CP	Benfica
1	0
- Date: 20 December 1987
- Venue: Estádio José Alvalade, Lisbon
- Referee: Fernando Alberto (Porto)

The 1987 Supertaça Cândido de Oliveira was the 9th edition of the Supertaça Cândido de Oliveira, the annual Portuguese football season-opening match contested by the winners of the previous season's top league and cup competitions (or cup runner-up in case the league- and cup-winning club is the same). The 1987 Supertaça Cândido de Oliveira was contested over two legs, and opposed Benfica and Sporting CP of the Primeira Liga. Benfica qualified for the SuperCup by winning the 1986–87 Primeira Divisão and the 1986–87 Taça de Portugal, whilst Sporting CP qualified for the Supertaça by being the cup-runner.

The first leg which took place at the Estádio da Luz, saw Sporting CP defeat Benfica 3–0. The second leg which took place at the Estádio José Alvalade saw a 1–0 Sporting CP win (4–0 on aggregate), which granted the Leões a second Supertaça.

== First leg ==
=== Details ===
6 December 1987

Benfica	0–3	Sporting CP
		Edmundo 20' (o.g.); Silvinho 72'; Cascavel 78'

Estádio da Luz, Lisbon
Referee: Sepa Santos (Lisbon)

Benfica	Sporting CP

GK	1	(Portugal) Manuel Bento (c)
DF	4	(Brazil) Carlos Mozer
DF	2	(Portugal) Carlos Pereira
DF	3	(Portugal) Edmundo
MF	6	(Portugal) Carlos Manuel	Booked
MF	5	(Portugal) Adelino Nunes
MF	8	(Brazil) Elzo
MF	7	(Zaire) Tueba Menayame		(substituted off) 60'
MF	10	(Portugal) Fernando Chalana		(substituted off) 73'
FW	9	(Portugal) Rui Águas
FW	11	(Portugal) Chiquinho Carlos
Substitutes:
MF		(Brazil) Wando		(substituted on) 73'
FW		(Sweden) Mats Magnusson		(substituted on) 60'
Manager:
(Portugal) Toni

GK	1	(Portugal) Jorge Vital
DF	2	(Portugal) Fernando Mendes
DF	3	(Brazil) João Luís
DF	4	(Portugal) Virgílio Lopes (c)		(substituted off) 68'
DF	5	(Brazil) Duílio
DF	6	(Portugal) António Morato
MF	7	(Portugal) Carlos Xavier
MF	8	(Portugal) Mário Jorge	Booked
FW	9	(Brazil) Silvinho
FW	10	(England) Tony Sealy		(substituted off) 68'
FW	11	(Brazil) Paulinho Cascavel
Substitutes:
MF		(Brazil) Mário Marques		(substituted on) 68'
FW		(Brazil) Marlon Brandão		(substituted on) 68'
Manager:
(England) Keith Burkinshaw

Match officials

- Assistant referees:
- Fourth official:

Match rules

- 90 minutes.
- Maximum of two substitutions

== Second leg ==
=== Details ===
20 December 1987

Sporting CP	1–0	Benfica
Silvinho 20'

Estádio José Alvalade, Lisbon
Referee: Fernando Alberto (Porto)

Sporting CP	Benfica

GK	1	(Portugal) Jorge Vital
DF	2	(Portugal) António Morato	Booked
DF		(Brazil) João Luís
DF		(Portugal) Virgílio Lopes
DF		(Brazil) Duílio
MF	7	(Portugal) Oceano (c)
MF		(Portugal) Mário Jorge
MF		(Portugal) Carlos Xavier		(substituted off) 79'
FW		(Brazil) Silvinho
FW		(England) Tony Sealy		(substituted off) 72'
FW	9	(Brazil) Paulinho Cascavel
Substitutes:
MF		(Brazil) Mário Marques		(substituted on) 72'
FW		(Brazil) Marlon Brandão		(substituted on) 79'
Manager:
(England) Keith Burkinshaw

GK	1	(Portugal) Silvino
DF	(Portugal) Álvaro Magalhães
DF	(Portugal) Carlos Pereira
DF	(Portugal) Edmundo
MF	(Brazil) Elzo
MF	(Portugal) Shéu (c)	Booked
MF	(Portugal) Adelino Nunes
MF	(Brazil) Wando	(substituted off) 82'
MF	(Zaire) Tueba Menayane	(substituted off) 72'
FW	8	(Sweden) Mats Magnusson
FW	(Portugal) Chiquinho Carlos
Substitutes:
MF	(Portugal) António Pacheco	(substituted on) 82'
FW	(Portugal) Rui Águas	(substituted on) 72'
Manager:
(Portugal) Toni

Match officials

- Assistant referees:
- Fourth official:

Match rules

- 90 minutes.
- Maximum of two substitutions

1987 Supertaça Cândido de Oliveira Winners
Sporting CP
2nd Title

== See also ==
- Derby de Lisboa
- 1987–88 Primeira Divisão
- 1987–88 S.L. Benfica season
