= 1986 Taça de Portugal final =

- Event: 1985–86 Taça de Portugal
Belenenses	Benfica
0	2
- Date: 27 April 1986
- Venue: Estádio Nacional, Oeiras
- Referee: Vitor Correia (Lisbon)

The 1986 Taça de Portugal final was the final match of the 1985–86 Taça de Portugal, which was the 46th season of the Taça de Portugal, the premier Portuguese football cup competition, organized by the Portuguese Football Federation (FPF). The match was played on 27 April 1986, at the Estádio Nacional in Oeiras, and opposed two Primeira Liga sides: Belenenses and Benfica. Benfica defeated Belenenses 2–0 to claim the Taça de Portugal for a twentieth time.

In Portugal, the final was televised live on RTP. As a result of Benfica winning the Taça de Portugal, the Águias qualified for the 1986 Supertaça Cândido de Oliveira where they took on 1985–86 Primeira Divisão winners Porto.

== Match ==
=== Details ===
27 April 1986

Belenenses	0–2	Benfica
		Nunes 35'; Águas 69'

Estádio Nacional, Oeiras
Referee: Vitor Correia (Lisbon)

Belenenses	Benfica

GK	1	(Portugal) Jorge Martins
DF	5	(Portugal) Artur
DF	4	(Portugal) Luís Sobrinho
DF	2	(Portugal) Joaquim Murça		(substituted off) 62'
DF	6	(Portugal) Alberto Fonseca
MF	3	(Spain) Canito
MF	11	(Portugal) Paulo Monteiro
MF	9	(Portugal) Jaime Mercês (c)
MF	8	(Bulgaria) Vanio Kostov
FW	10	(Portugal) Luís Norton de Matos		(substituted off) 51'
FW	7	(Portugal) Joel Almeida	(yellow card) 37'
Substitutes:
FW	15	(Portugal) Jorge Silva		(substituted on) 62'
FW	16	(Portugal) Djão		(substituted on) 51'
Manager:
(Belgium) Henri Depireux

GK	1	(Portugal) Manuel Bento (c)
DF	3	(Portugal) António Oliveira
DF	5	(Portugal) Samuel Quina
DF	4	(Portugal) Álvaro Magalhães
DF	2	(Portugal) António Veloso
MF	10	(Portugal) Shéu
MF	11	(Portugal) Diamantino Miranda
MF	6	(Portugal) Adelino Nunes	(substituted off) 69'
FW	7	(Brazil) Wando
FW	9	(Portugal) Rui Águas
FW	8	(Denmark) Michael Manniche	(substituted off) 75'
Substitutes:
MF	14	(Portugal) Rui Pedro	(substituted on) 69'
MF	15	(Portugal) José Luís	(substituted on) 75'
Manager:
(England) John Mortimore

1985–86 Taça de Portugal Winners
Benfica
20th Title

Match officials

- Assistant referees:
- Fourth official:

Match rules

- 90 minutes.
- 30 minutes of extra time if necessary.
- Maximum of two substitutions
