= 1985 Supertaça Cândido de Oliveira =

- Event: Supertaça Cândido de Oliveira (Portuguese Super Cup)
Benfica	Porto
1	0

First leg
Benfica	Porto
1	0
- Date: 20 November 1985
- Venue: Estádio da Luz, Lisbon
- Referee: João Rosa (Évora)

Second leg
Porto	Benfica
0	0
- Date: 4 December 1985
- Venue: Estádio das Antas, Porto
- Referee: Fortunato Azevedo (Braga)

The 1985 Supertaça Cândido de Oliveira was the 7th edition of the Supertaça Cândido de Oliveira, the annual Portuguese football season-opening match contested by the winners of the previous season's top league and cup competitions (or cup runner-up in case the league- and cup-winning club is the same). The 1985 Supertaça Cândido de Oliveira was contested over two legs, and opposed Benfica and Porto of the Primeira Liga. Porto qualified for the SuperCup by winning the 1984–85 Primeira Divisão, whilst Benfica qualified for the Supertaça by winning the 1984–85 Taça de Portugal.

The first leg, which took place at the Estádio da Luz, saw Benfica defeat Porto 1–0. The second leg, which took place at the Estádio das Antas, saw a 0–0 scoreline (1–0 on aggregate), which granted the Águias a second Supertaça.

== First leg ==
=== Details ===
20 November 1985

Benfica	1–0	Porto
Diamantino 38'

Estádio da Luz, Lisbon
Referee: João Rosa (Évora)

Benfica	Porto

GK	1	(Portugal) Manuel Bento
DF	(Portugal) António Bastos Lopes
DF	(Portugal) António Veloso
DF	(Portugal) Álvaro Magalhães
DF	(Portugal) António Oliveira
MF	(Portugal) Adelino Nunes
MF	(Portugal) Diamantino Miranda
MF	(Portugal) Shéu (c)
FW	(Denmark) Michael Manniche
FW	(Portugal) Nené	(substituted off) 65'
FW	(Brazil) Wando	(substituted off) 64'
Substitutes:
GK	(Portugal) Neno
DF	(Portugal) Minervino Pietra	(substituted on) 64'
MF	(Portugal) Rui Pedro	(substituted on) 65'
FW	(Portugal) César Brito
FW	(Portugal) Rui Águas
Manager:
(England) John Mortimore

GK	1	(Portugal) Zé Beto
DF	(Portugal) João Pinto (c)
DF	(Portugal) Eduardo Luís
DF	(Portugal) António Lima Pereira
DF	(Portugal) Laureta
MF	(Portugal) Vermelhinho
MF	(Portugal) José Semedo
MF	(Portugal) António André
FW	(Portugal) Fernando Gomes
FW	(Portugal) Paulo Futre	(substituted off) 46'
FW	(Algeria) Rabah Madjer
Substitutes:
GK	(Portugal) Luís Matos
DF	(Brazil) Ralph Stange
DF	(Portugal) João Festas	(substituted on) 46'
FW	(Portugal) Paquito
FW	(Portugal) José Albano
Manager:
(Portugal) Artur Jorge

Match officials

- Assistant referees:
- Fourth official:

Match rules

- 90 minutes.
- Maximum of two substitutions

== Second leg ==
=== Details ===
4 December 1985

Porto	0–0	Benfica

Estádio das Antas, Porto
Referee: Fortunato Azevedo (Braga)

Porto	Benfica

GK	1	(Portugal) Zé Beto
DF	(Portugal) João Pinto (c)
DF	(Portugal) Laureta
DF	(Portugal) António Lima Pereira
DF	(Portugal) João Festas	(yellow card) 53'
MF	(Portugal) José Semedo	(substituted off) 53'
MF	(Brazil) Elói	(substituted off) 27'
MF	(Portugal) António André
FW	(Portugal) Fernando Gomes
FW	(Portugal) Paulo Futre
FW	(Algeria) Rabah Madjer	(yellow card) 89'
Substitutes:
GK	(Portugal) António Amaral
MF	(Portugal) Vermelhinho
FW	(Brazil) Paulo Ricardo	(substituted on) 53'
FW	(Brazil) Juary	(substituted on) 27'
Manager:
(Portugal) Artur Jorge

GK	1	(Portugal) Manuel Bento
DF	(Portugal) Álvaro Magalhães	(yellow card) 24'
DF	(Portugal) António Veloso
DF	(Portugal) Samuel Quina
DF	(Portugal) António Oliveira
MF	(Portugal) Carlos Manuel	(yellow card) 65'
MF	(Portugal) Shéu (c)
MF	(Portugal) Diamantino Miranda	(substituted off) 87'
FW	(Denmark) Michael Manniche
FW	(Portugal) Wando	(substituted off) 64'
FW	(Brazil) Nené
Substitutes:
GK	(Portugal) José Delgado
DF	(Portugal) Minervino Pietra
DF	(Portugal) António Bastos Lopes	(substituted on) 64'
FW	(Portugal) Rui Águas
FW	(Portugal) César Brito	(substituted on) 87'
Manager:
(England) John Mortimore

Match officials

- Assistant referees:
- Fourth official:

Match rules

- 90 minutes.
- Maximum of two substitutions

1985 Supertaça Cândido de Oliveira Winners
Benfica
2nd Title

== See also ==
- O Clássico
- 1985–86 Primeira Divisão
- 1985–86 S.L. Benfica season
