= 1988 European Cup final =

- Event: 1987–88 European Cup
PSV Eindhoven	Benfica
(Netherlands)	(Portugal)
0	0
- After extra time PSV Eindhoven won 6–5 on penalties
- Date: 25 May 1988
- Venue: Neckarstadion, Stuttgart
- Referee: Luigi Agnolin (Italy)
- Attendance: 64,000

The 1988 European Cup final was a football match played between PSV Eindhoven of the Netherlands and Benfica of Portugal to decide the champion of the 1987–88 European Cup. PSV won 6–5 on penalties after a goalless draw after extra time. The match was played at Neckarstadion, Stuttgart, on 25 May 1988. According to PSV player Berry van Aerle, it was not a particularly good match, with both teams very cautious. However, it was exciting until the end and concluded in a tense penalty shoot-out.

For PSV, this win secured a treble of the Dutch Cup, the Dutch Championship and the European Cup. Five members of the PSV side were also part of the Netherlands team that went on to win UEFA Euro 1988 in West Germany that summer.

== Route to the final ==
(Netherlands) PSV Eindhoven				Round	(Portugal) Benfica			
Opponent	Agg.	1st leg	2nd leg		Opponent	Agg.	1st leg	2nd leg
(Turkey) Galatasaray	3–2	3–0 (H)	0–2 (A)	First round	(Albania) Partizani Tirana	4–0	4–0 (H)	w/o (A)
(Austria) Rapid Wien	4–1	2–1 (A)	2–0 (H)	Second round	(Denmark) AGF	1–0	0–0 (A)	1–0 (H)
(France) Girondins de Bordeaux	1–1 (a)	1–1 (A)	0–0 (H)	Quarter-finals	(Belgium) Anderlecht	2–1	2–0 (H)	0–1 (A)
(Spain) Real Madrid	1–1 (a)	1–1 (A)	0–0 (H)	Semi-finals	(Romania) Steaua București	2–0	0–0 (A)	2–0 (H)

== Match ==
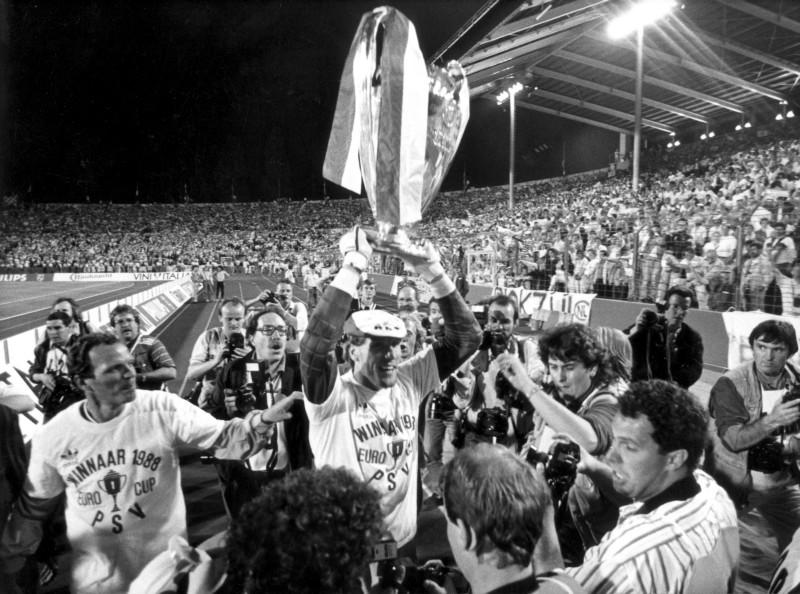
Willy van de Kerkhof (left) and Hans van Breukelen (who saved the decisive penalty) celebrating the title

=== Details ===
25 May 1988
20:15 CEST

PSV Eindhoven (Netherlands)	0–0 (a.e.t.)	(Portugal) Benfica
	Report
Penalties
Koeman (penalty scored); Kieft (penalty scored); Nielsen (penalty scored); Vanenburg (penalty scored); Lerby (penalty scored); Janssen (penalty scored)	6–5	(penalty scored) Elzo; (penalty scored) Dito; (penalty scored) Redouane; (penalty scored) Pacheco; (penalty scored) Mozer; (penalty missed) Veloso

Neckarstadion, Stuttgart
Attendance: 64,000
Referee: Luigi Agnolin (Italy)

PSV Eindhoven	Benfica

GK	1	(Netherlands) Hans van Breukelen
RB	2	(Belgium) Eric Gerets (c)
CB	3	(Denmark) Ivan Nielsen
CB	4	(Netherlands) Ronald Koeman
LB	5	(Denmark) Jan Heintze
CM	6	(Denmark) Søren Lerby	(yellow card) 106'
LM	7	(Netherlands) Berry van Aerle
RM	8	(Netherlands) Gerald Vanenburg
CM	9	(Netherlands) Edward Linskens
CF	10	(Netherlands) Wim Kieft
CF	11	(Netherlands) Hans Gillhaus		(substituted off) 105+2'
Substitutes:
DF	12	(Netherlands) Adick Koot
FW	13	(Netherlands) Eric Viscaal
MF	14	(Netherlands) Anton Janssen		(substituted on) 105+2'
MF	15	(Netherlands) Willy van de Kerkhof
GK	16	(Netherlands) Patrick Lodewijks
Manager:
(Netherlands) Guus Hiddink

GK	1	(Portugal) Silvino
RB	2	(Portugal) António Veloso
CB	3	(Portugal) Dito
LB	4	(Portugal) Álvaro
CB	5	(Brazil) Carlos Mozer
CM	6	(Brazil) Elzo
RM	7	(Brazil) Chiquinho Carlos
LM	8	(Portugal) António Pacheco
CF	9	(Portugal) Rui Águas	(substituted off) 56'
CM	10	(Portugal) Shéu (c)
CF	11	(Sweden) Mats Magnusson	(substituted off) 112'
Substitutes:
GK	12	(Portugal) Manuel Bento
DF	13	(Portugal) Samuel
MF	14	(Portugal) Adelino Nunes
FW	15	(Morocco) Hajry Redouane	(substituted on) 112'
FW	16	(Brazil) Wando	(substituted on) 56'
Manager:
(Portugal) Toni

== See also ==
- 1987–88 PSV Eindhoven season
- 1987–88 S.L. Benfica season
- 1988 European Cup Winners' Cup final
- 1988 European Super Cup
- 1988 UEFA Cup final
- PSV Eindhoven in European football
- S.L. Benfica in international football
