= Diamantino Miranda =

Portuguese footballer (born 1959)

Diamantino
Personal information
- Full name: Diamantino Manuel Fernandes Miranda
- Date of birth: 3 August 1959 (age 67)
- Place of birth: Moita, Portugal
- Height: 1.73 m (5 ft 8 in)
- Position: Midfielder

Youth career
- 1973–1976: Vitória Setúbal
- 1977–1978: Benfica

Senior career*
Years	Team	Apps	(Gls)
1976–1977	Vitória Setúbal	14	(1)
1977–1981	Benfica	9	(2)
1980–1981	→ Amora (loan)	20	(3)
1981–1982	Boavista	28	(8)
1982–1990	Benfica	204	(52)
1990–1993	Vitória Setúbal	69	(11)
Total		344	(77)

International career
1976	Portugal U16	3	(0)
1976–1978	Portugal U18	21	(7)
1979	Portugal U20	6	(1)
1981	Portugal U21	4	(0)
1982	Portugal B	1	(0)
1981–1986	Portugal	22	(5)

Managerial career
- 1994: Vitória Setúbal
- 1995: Desportivo Beja
- 1995–1997: Campomaiorense
- 1998: Gil Vicente
- 1998–2000: Felgueiras
- 2001: Campomaiorense
- 2003: Vitória Setúbal
- 2003–2005: Felgueiras
- 2005–2006: Portimonense
- 2007: Varzim
- 2007–2008: Olhanense
- 2008–2009: Benfica (assistant)
- 2009–2010: Benfica U19
- 2010: Fátima
- 2012–2013: Costa Sol
- 2019–2020: Liga Desportiva
Medal record
Men's football
Representing Portugal
UEFA European Championship
Bronze medal – third place	1984 France
- * Club domestic league appearances and goals

Diamantino Manuel Fernandes Miranda (born 3 August 1959), known simply as Diamantino in his playing days, is a Portuguese former professional footballer who played as a midfielder. He also worked as a manager.

He most notably played for Benfica (11 seasons in two separate spells), appearing in more than 300 official matches and winning 11 major titles. After retiring, he embarked in a lengthy managerial career.

An international for five years, Diamantino represented Portugal at the 1986 World Cup and Euro 1984.

== Club career ==
Born in Moita, Setúbal District, Diamantino was one of S.L. Benfica's key players during the 1980s, winning several Primeira Liga and Taça de Portugal titles. He also played in the UEFA Cup final in 1983, lost to R.S.C. Anderlecht (0–1 and 1–1), missing the European Cup final in 1988 due to injury, in another defeat, this time to PSV Eindhoven on penalties.

Diamantino left Benfica at the end of the 1989–90 season, after appearing in just 15 league matches as the team won the Supertaça Cândido de Oliveira. He was also an unused substitute in their second European Cup loss in three years, against AC Milan, moving in the subsequent off-season to his first professional club Vitória F.C. where he played three more years, retiring at 33.

== International career ==
At youth level, Diamantino represented Portugal in two competitions: the 1978 UEFA European Under-18 Championship in Poland and the 1979 FIFA World Youth Championship in Japan, playing three games in each tournament. He earned 22 caps with five goals for the full side, his debut coming on 18 November 1981 in a 2–1 win against Scotland for the 1982 FIFA World Cup qualifiers. He represented the nation at both UEFA Euro 1984 and the 1986 World Cup; in the latter tournament, in a 3–1 group stage loss to Morocco on 11 July, he appeared in his last match and scored his last goal.

== Coaching career ==
A manager since 1994, starting at Setúbal, Diamantino managed that club for a handful of games in two top-flight spells, nearly a decade apart. Additionally at that level, he had two stints in charge of S.C. Campomaiorense.

Diamantino was appointed Segunda Liga side S.C. Olhanense's manager midway through 2007–08, having started the campaign at Varzim S.C. in the same league. In May 2008 he joined Benfica as an assistant coach, under new boss Quique Sánchez Flores; both left the post at the end of the season, after which he moved to the youth academy.

In summer 2010, Diamantino signed for second-tier C.D. Fátima, being fired in late November. He moved abroad for the first time in his career to manage CD Costa do Sol in Mozambique, but his spell at the club ended in October 2013 when Minister of Labour Maria Helena Taipo expelled him from the southern African country for having called its people "thieves" in protest at a refereeing decision; he returned to the Moçambola in January 2019, when he was hired at Liga Desportiva de Maputo.

== Honours ==
=== Player ===
Benfica

- Primeira Divisão: 1982–83, 1983–84, 1986–87, 1988–89
- Taça de Portugal: 1979–80, 1982–83, 1984–85, 1985–86, 1986–87
- Supertaça Cândido de Oliveira: 1985, 1989
- European Cup runner-up: 1987–88, 1989–90
- UEFA Cup runner-up: 1982–83

=== Manager ===
Campomaiorense

- Segunda Liga: 1996–97
