= Rui Águas =

Rui Águas may refer to:

- Rui Águas (footballer) (born 1960), former Portuguese football striker
- Rui Águas (racing driver) (born 1972), Portuguese driver
