= Jorge Vital =

Portuguese footballer (born 1961)

Personal information
- Full name: Jorge Manuel Domingues Maria Vital
- Date of birth: 13 July 1961 (age 65)
- Place of birth: Tomar, Portugal
- Height: 1.72 m (5 ft 8 in)
- Position: Goalkeeper

Team information
- Current team: AC Milan (goalkeeping coach)

Youth career
- União de Tomar

Senior career*
Years	Team	Apps	(Gls)
1980–1981	União de Tomar	30	(0)
1981–1982	Rio Maior	0	(0)
1982–1984	Lusitano	72	(0)
1984–1986	Portimonense	36	(0)
1986–1990	Sporting CP	33	(0)
1990–1992	Estrela da Amadora	10	(0)
1992–1993	Tirsense	11	(0)
1993–1998	Gil Vicente	77	(0)
1998–2001	Esposende	102	(0)

Managerial career
- 2001–2011: Braga (goalkeeping coach)
- 2011–2012: Sporting CP (goalkeeping coach)
- 2012–2020: Braga (goalkeeping coach)
- 2020–2024: Sporting CP (goalkeeping coach)
- 2024–2026: Manchester United (goalkeeping coach)
- 2026–: AC Milan (goalkeeping coach)
- * Club domestic league appearances and goals

Jorge Manuel Domingues Maria Vital (born 13 July 1961), commonly known as Jorge Vital is a Portuguese football coach and former player who played as a goalkeeper. Currently a goalkeeping coach at Serie A club AC Milan.

== Honors ==
- Supertaça Cândido de Oliveira: 1987
