= John Mortimore (footballer) =

English footballer (1934–2021)

Personal information
- Full name: John Henry Mortimore
- Date of birth: 23 September 1934
- Place of birth: Farnborough, Hampshire, England
- Date of death: 26 January 2021 (aged 86)
- Position: Defender

Senior career*
Years	Team	Apps	(Gls)
- Woking
1956–1965	Chelsea	249	(8)
1965–1966	Queens Park Rangers	10	(0)

Managerial career
- 1971–1972: Ethnikos Piraeus
- 1973–1974: Portsmouth
- 1975–1976: Ethnikos Piraeus
- 1976–1979: Benfica
- 1985–1987: Benfica
- 1987–1988: Real Betis
- 1988–1989: Belenenses
- 1994: Southampton (joint caretaker)
- * Club domestic league appearances and goals

John Henry Mortimore (23 September 1934 – 26 January 2021) was an English football player and manager.

== Career ==
Mortimore played as a centre half in the Football League for Chelsea, with whom he scored 10 goals from 279 games in all competitions between 1956 and 1965 and won the 1965 Football League Cup, and for Queens Park Rangers. As manager, he had spells at Portsmouth, Benfica, where he won the national championship in both 1976–77 and 1986–87, and the Portuguese Cup in 1986 and 1987, Belenenses and, in a very brief stint as joint caretaker, Southampton. He also coached at clubs including Sunderland, Chelsea and Southampton, where he eventually became club president.

He died on 26 January 2021, aged 86.

== Honours ==
=== Player ===
Chelsea

- Football League Cup: 1964–65

=== Manager ===
Benfica

- Primeira Liga: 1976–77, 1986–87
- Taça de Portugal: 1985–86, 1986–87
- Supertaça Cândido de Oliveira: 1985
