= Edu (footballer, born 1990) =

Portuguese footballer

Personal information
- Full name: Eduardo Augusto Cameselle Machado
- Date of birth: 2 March 1990 (age 36)
- Place of birth: Barcelos, Portugal
- Height: 1.86 m (6 ft 1 in)
- Position: Midfielder

Youth career
- 2000–2005: Gil Vicente
- 2005–2006: Benfica
- 2006–2009: Braga

Senior career*
Years	Team	Apps	(Gls)
2009–2010	Braga	0	(0)
2009–2010	→ Estrela Amadora (loan)	0	(0)
2010	→ Vizela (loan)	2	(0)
2010–2011	Valenciano	26	(0)
2011	Mirandela	6	(0)
2012	Fão	18	(3)
2012–2013	Trofense	3	(0)
2013–2014	Ninense	6	(0)
2018	Águias Alvelos	2	(0)
2018–2019	Cabreiros	30	(8)
2019–2020	Limianos	16	(4)
2020–2021	Pousa	10	(2)
2021–2022	Águias Alvelos	8	(9)
2022–2023	Perelhal		
Total		127	(26)

International career
2005	Portugal U16	3	(0)
2007	Portugal U17	2	(0)
- * Club domestic league appearances and goals

Eduardo Augusto Cameselle Machado (born 2 March 1990), commonly known as Edu, is a Portuguese former footballer who played as a midfielder.

== Club career ==
Born in Barcelos, Braga District, Edu began his career at hometown club Gil Vicente F.C. and had two years in the ranks of S.L. Benfica before joining S.C. Braga in 2006. He never made a first-team appearance, and competed in the lower divisions before joining Segunda Liga side C.D. Trofense in July 2012.

Edu made his professional league debut on 12 August 2012, featuring the full 90 minutes of a 2–0 away loss against C.D. Aves in the first matchday. He played two further league games off the bench, and as many in the Taça da Liga.

== Personal life ==
Edu was the nephew of former Portugal international Dito.
