= Chiquinho Carlos =

Brazilian footballer (born 1963)

Personal information
- Full name: Francisco Carlos
- Date of birth: 26 April 1963 (age 63)
- Place of birth: Taquaritinga, Brazil
- Height: 1.78 m (5 ft 10 in)
- Position: Forward

Senior career*
Years	Team	Apps	(Gls)
1983–1984	Botafogo-SP		
1985–1986	Flamengo	76	(23)
1986–1988	Benfica	55	(14)
1988–1991	Vitória Guimarães	104	(29)
1991–1993	Braga	65	(22)
1993–1995	Vitória Setúbal	47	(5)
1995–1997	Académico Viseu	36	(5)
1997–1998	Atlético	27	(4)
1998–2001	Mafra		
2001–2007	Igreja Nova		
Total		410	(102)
- * Club domestic league appearances and goals

Francisco Carlos (born 26 April 1963), known as Chiquinho Carlos, is a Brazilian retired footballer who played as a forward.

He spent 11 years of his professional career in Portugal (21 in total in the country), amassing Primeira Liga totals of 271 matches and 70 goals over nine seasons and representing mainly Benfica, Vitória de Guimarães and Braga.

== Club career ==
Born in Taquaritinga, São Paulo, Chiquinho Carlos started playing with Botafogo Futebol Clube (SP) and CR Flamengo. In 1986, he moved to Portugal where he would remain for the rest of his career, representing S.L. Benfica, Vitória de Guimarães, S.C. Braga, Vitória de Setúbal, Académico de Viseu F.C. and Atlético Clube de Portugal.

Chiquinho scored in his first official game for Benfica, a 2–2 away draw against FC Porto on 24 August 1986. He won the double in his first season, going on to take part in 80 competitive matches during his two-year spell and score 21 goals. Additionally, he appeared with the side in the 1987–88 European Cup, playing the full 120 minutes in the final, a penalty shootout loss to PSV Eindhoven.

From ages 35 to 44, Chiquinho Carlos played amateur football with C.D. Mafra and G.D. Igreja Nova. He returned to the former immediately after retiring, acting as goalkeeper coach for several years.

== Honours ==
Benfica

- Primeira Liga: 1986–87
- Taça de Portugal: 1986–87
- Supertaça Cândido de Oliveira runner-up: 1986, 1987

Vitória Guimarães

- Supertaça Cândido de Oliveira: 1988
