= António Veloso =

Portuguese football manager and former player

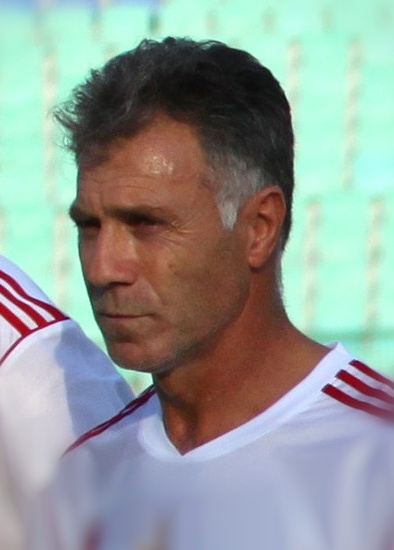
- Veloso in 2011

Personal information
- Full name: António Augusto da Silva Veloso
- Date of birth: 31 January 1957 (age 69)
- Place of birth: São João da Madeira, Portugal
- Height: 1.78 m (5 ft 10 in)
- Position: Full-back

Youth career
- 1972–1976: Sanjoanense

Senior career*
Years	Team	Apps	(Gls)
1976–1978	Sanjoanense	27	(1)
1978–1980	Beira-Mar	56	(4)
1980–1995	Benfica	419	(9)
Total		502	(14)

International career
1981–1994	Portugal	40	(0)

Managerial career
- 1996–2000: Alverca
- 2000–2001: Atlético
- 2002: Benfica (assistant)
- 2001–2002: Benfica B
- 2006–2007: Atlético Malveira
- 2008–2009: Oeiras
- 2009–2010: Estrela Amadora
Medal record
Men's football
Representing Portugal
UEFA European Championship
Bronze medal – third place	1984 France
- * Club domestic league appearances and goals

António Augusto da Silva Veloso (born 31 January 1957) is a Portuguese former footballer who played most of his professional career with Benfica. A gritty defender who could appear in the flanks and on occasion in the middle, he spent a decade and a half at his main club, and was team captain from 1988 to 1995.

An international for 13 years, Veloso represented Portugal at Euro 1984.

== Club career ==
Born in São João da Madeira, Veloso started playing football with his hometown club A.D. Sanjoanense, then moved to S.C. Beira-Mar for a further two seasons. He signed with S.L. Benfica for 1980–81, and was ever-present until his retirement, helping the capital side to seven Primeira Liga and five Taça de Portugal trophies.

With Benfica, Veloso also played in the UEFA Cup final in 1982–83, as they lost to R.S.C. Anderlecht 2–1 on aggregate and, most notably, in the 1987–88 European Cup final, where he missed the penalty shootout attempt that gave PSV Eindhoven the win (6–5).

Suspension left Veloso out of the team that reached the 1990 European Cup final, lost to AC Milan. He retired at 38 after 15 seasons with the same club and 658 competitive appearances, subsequently becoming a coach.

== International career ==
Veloso earned 40 caps for Portugal, making his debut on 18 November 1981 in a 2–1 win over Scotland for the 1982 FIFA World Cup qualifiers. He played at UEFA Euro 1984 where the national team reached the semi-finals, and was left outside the 1986 World Cup squad due to a doping test, which was later proved to be fake.

Veloso's last international game came at age 36, in a 2–2 friendly draw with Spain on 19 January 1994.

== Personal life ==
Veloso's son, Miguel, is also a professional footballer. After an unassuming youth spell at Benfica, he went on to represent neighbours Sporting CP and also the national team.

== Honours ==
Benfica

- Primeira Liga: 1980–81, 1982–83, 1983–84, 1986–87, 1988–89, 1990–91, 1993–94
- Taça de Portugal: 1980–81, 1982–83, 1984–85, 1985–86, 1986–87, 1992–93
- Supertaça Cândido de Oliveira: 1980, 1985, 1989
