= Laureta =

Portuguese footballer

Personal information
- Full name: Alfredo Magalhães Silva Rodrigues
- Date of birth: 18 December 1961 (age 64)
- Place of birth: Azurém, Portugal
- Height: 1.73 m (5 ft 8 in)
- Position: Left-back

Youth career
- 1976–1980: Vitória Guimarães

Senior career*
Years	Team	Apps	(Gls)
1980–1985	Vitória Guimarães	89	(2)
1980–1981	→ Mirandela (loan)	27	(6)
1985–1987	Porto	24	(1)
1987–1991	Braga	134	(1)
1991–1994	Gil Vicente	95	(0)
1994–1995	Académica	19	(0)
Total		388	(10)

International career
1981–1983	Portugal U21	16	(1)
1983	Portugal	1	(0)
- * Club domestic league appearances and goals

Alfredo Magalhães Silva Rodrigues (born 18 December 1961 in Azurém, Guimarães), known as Laureta, is a Portuguese former professional footballer who played as a left-back.

== Honours ==
Porto

- Primeira Divisão: 1985–86
