= Edmundo Silva =

Portuguese football manager and former player

Edmundo
Personal information
- Full name: Edmundo Joaquim Pascoal da Silva
- Date of birth: 12 October 1963 (age 63)
- Place of birth: Setúbal, Portugal
- Height: 1.86 m (6 ft 1 in)
- Position: Centre back

Youth career
- 1978–1979: Palmelense
- 1979–1981: Comércio Indústria
- 1981–1982: Vitória Setúbal

Senior career*
Years	Team	Apps	(Gls)
1982–1986	Vitória Setúbal	66	(0)
1986–1990	Benfica	31	(2)
1988–1989	→ Vitória Setúbal (loan)	38	(0)
1989–1990	→ Belenenses (loan)	30	(1)
1990–1992	Belenenses	48	(0)
1992–1995	Estrela Amadora	66	(2)
1995–1996	Vitória Setúbal	2	(0)
1996–1997	Desportivo Beja	30	(1)
1997–1998	União Montemor	29	(1)
Total		340	(7)

International career
1984–1985	Portugal U21	3	(0)

Managerial career
- 1999–2000: Imortal (assistant)
- 2002: Imortal
- 2003–2005: Sesimbra
- 2005–2009: Vitória Setúbal (assistant)
- * Club domestic league appearances and goals

Edmundo Joaquim Pascoal da Silva (born 12 October 1963), known simply as Edmundo, is a Portuguese retired footballer who played as a central defender.

He amassed Primeira Liga totals of 227 games and five goals during 11 seasons, five of those with Vitória de Setúbal.

== Club career ==
Born in Setúbal, Edmundo spent four Primeira Liga seasons with hometown club Vitória FC, after which he signed with S.L. Benfica in 1986. Following a 1–7 away loss against Sporting CP in a Lisbon derby in December, he replaced António Oliveira and partnered Dito for the rest of the season, but lost his starting position after the arrival of Carlos Mozer.

Edmundo returned to Setúbal on a loan deal in 1988 in a move involving Hernâni Neves, later joining C.F. Os Belenenses in the same situation and agreeing to a permanent contract with the latter at the end of the campaign. Having alternated between the top division and the second level in the following years, also representing C.F. Estrela da Amadora and C.D. Beja, he closed out his career at nearly 35 after a spell in the lower leagues with Grupo União Sport Montemor.

== International career ==
Edmundo played three times for Portugal at under-21 level during the qualifying stage for the 1986 UEFA European Championship.

== Honours ==
Benfica

- Primeira Liga: 1986–87
- Taça de Portugal: 1986–87
- European Cup: Runner-up 1987–88
