= Maria Helena Taipo =

Mozambican politician

Maria Helena Taipo (born 12 August 1961) is a Mozambican politician who was Minister of Labor for ten years and has been governor of Sofala Province since 2015.

== Early life and education ==
Taipo was born on 12 August 1961 in Chihilo village, Malema District, Nampula Province. She finished her schooling in 1979 and completed a bachelor's degree in education sciences at the Catholic University of Mozambique in 2000. In 2004, she completed a master's degree in educational management.

== Career ==
Taipo is a member of the Mozambique Liberation Front and was appointed Minister of Labor in 2005 by President Armando Guebuza, and was reappointed after the 2009 election.

After the 2014 presidential election, Filipe Nyusi did not keep Taipo in the cabinet, but on 19 January 2015 appointed her as governor Sofala province. In 2015, during a confrontation between police forces and elements of the Mozambican National Resistance in Beira, Taipo intervened to assure that tensions would not lead to armed conflict.
