= 1990 European Cup final =

- Match programme cover
- Event: 1989–90 European Cup
| Milan | Benfica |
| (Italy) | (Portugal) |
| 1 | 0 |
- Date: 23 May 1990
- Venue: Praterstadion, Vienna
- Referee: Helmut Kohl (Austria)
- Attendance: 58,000

The 1990 European Cup final was a football match between title holders Milan of Italy and Benfica of Portugal, played on 23 May 1990 at the Praterstadion in Vienna, Austria. The winning goal came for Milan in the 67th minute, when Frank Rijkaard ran through the opposing defence and scored the only goal of the match.

Milan were the last club to successfully defend their title until Real Madrid in 2017.

== Route to the final ==
| (Italy) Milan | | | | Round | (Portugal) Benfica | | | |
|---|---|---|---|---|---|---|---|---|
| Opponent | Agg. | 1st leg | 2nd leg | | Opponent | Agg. | 1st leg | 2nd leg |
| (Finland) HJK | 5–0 | 4–0 (H) | 1–0 (A) | First round | (Northern Ireland) Derry City | 6–1 | 2–1 (A) | 4–0 (H) |
| (Spain) Real Madrid | 2–1 | 2–0 (H) | 0–1 (A) | Second round | (Hungary) Budapest Honvéd | 9–0 | 2–0 (A) | 7–0 (H) |
| (Belgium) Mechelen | 2–0 | 0–0 (A) | 2–0 (a.e.t.) (H) | Quarter-finals | (Soviet Union) Dnipro | 4–0 | 1–0 (H) | 3–0 (A) |
| (West Germany) Bayern Munich | 2–2 (a) | 1–0 (H) | 1–2 (a.e.t.) (A) | Semi-finals | (France) Marseille | 2–2 (a) | 1–2 (A) | 1–0 (H) |

== Match ==
=== Details ===
23 May 1990
20:15 CEST

| Milan (Italy) | 1–0 | (Portugal) Benfica |
|---|---|---|
| Rijkaard 67' | Report |

Praterstadion, Vienna
Attendance: 58,000
Referee: Helmut Kohl (Austria)

| Milan | Benfica |

| GK | 1 | (Italy) Giovanni Galli |
| RB | 2 | (Italy) Mauro Tassotti |
| CB | 5 | (Italy) Alessandro Costacurta |
| CB | 6 | (Italy) Franco Baresi (c) |
| LB | 3 | (Italy) Paolo Maldini |
| RM | 4 | (Italy) Angelo Colombo | (substituted off) 90' |
| CM | 7 | (Italy) Carlo Ancelotti | (substituted off) 75' |
| CM | 8 | (Netherlands) Frank Rijkaard |
| LM | 11 | (Italy) Alberico Evani |
| CF | 9 | (Netherlands) Marco van Basten |
| CF | 10 | (Netherlands) Ruud Gullit |
Substitutes:
| GK | 12 | (Italy) Andrea Pazzagli |
| DF | 13 | (Italy) Filippo Galli | (substituted on) 90' |
| FW | 14 | (Italy) Daniele Massaro | (substituted on) 75' |
| FW | 15 | (Italy) Marco Simone |
| FW | 16 | (Italy) Stefano Borgonovo |
Manager:
(Italy) Arrigo Sacchi

| GK | 1 | (Portugal) Silvino (c) |
| RB | 2 | (Portugal) José Carlos |
| CB | 3 | (Brazil) Ricardo Gomes | (yellow card) 65' |
| LB | 4 | (Portugal) Samuel |
| CB | 5 | (Brazil) Aldair | (yellow card) 40' |
| CM | 6 | (Sweden) Jonas Thern |
| RW | 7 | (Portugal) Vítor Paneira | | (substituted off) 76' |
| LW | 8 | (Portugal) António Pacheco | | (substituted off) 60' |
| DM | 9 | (Portugal) Hernâni |
| CM | 10 | (Brazil) Valdo |
| CF | 11 | (Sweden) Mats Magnusson |
Substitutes:
| GK | 12 | (Portugal) Manuel Bento |
| DF | 13 | (Portugal) Fernando Mendes |
| MF | 14 | (Portugal) Diamantino |
| FW | 15 | (Portugal) César Brito | | (substituted on) 60' |
| FW | 16 | (Angola) Vata | | (substituted on) 76' |
Manager:
(Sweden) Sven-Göran Eriksson

Assistant referees:
Hubert Forstinger (Austria)
Heinz Holzmann (Austria)
Fourth official:
Friedrich Kaupe (Austria)

Match rules

- 90 minutes
- 30 minutes of extra time if necessary
- Penalty shoot-out if scores still level
- Five named substitutes, of which two may be used

== See also ==
- 1963 European Cup final – contested between same teams
- 1989–90 AC Milan season
- 1989–90 S.L. Benfica season
- 1990 European Cup Winners' Cup final
- 1990 European Super Cup
- 1990 UEFA Cup final
- AC Milan in international football
- S.L. Benfica in international football
