= Elzo =

Brazilian footballer (born 1961)

Personal information
- Full name: Elzo Aloísio Coelho
- Date of birth: 22 January 1961 (age 65)
- Place of birth: Machado, Minas Gerais, Brazil
- Height: 1.77 m (5 ft 9 1/2 in)
- Position: Defensive midfielder

Senior career*
Years	Team	Apps	(Gls)
1978–1981	Ginásio Pinhalense	?	(?)
1981–1982	Inter de Limeira	?	(?)
1982	Amparo	?	(?)
1982–1984	Internacional	28	(3)
1984–1987	Atlético Mineiro	114	(6)
1987–1989	Benfica	51	(1)
1989–1991	Palmeiras	44	(2)
1991–1993	Catuense	?	(?)
1993	Caldense	?	(?)
Total		125	(7)

International career
1986	Brazil	11	(0)
- * Club domestic league appearances and goals

Elzo Aloísio Coelho (born 22 January 1961), better known as Elzo, is a retired Brazilian footballer who played as a midfielder for the national team, a number of Brazilian clubs, and Portuguese Benfica.

== Playing career ==
At the 1986 FIFA World Cup in Mexico, Elzo played an active role as a main starter for Brazil's squad in all five of the team's matches, playing alongside stars such as Carecca, Sócrates and Zico. In the group stage, the team won against Spain (1–0), Algeria (1–0), and Northern Ireland (3–0), and defeated the Poland national team 4–0 in the last 16. In the quarter-finals, they played against the France national team led by Michel Platini; however, after a 1–1 draw, the match went to a penalty shoot-out, and Brazil were eliminated from the competition in the last eight. He made 11 appearances for Brazil in total, all of which came in 1986.

In 1987 Elzo moved from Brazilian side Atlético Mineiro (after three seasons with the club, winning the Campeonato Mineiro in 1985 and 1986) to Benfica in Portugal, where he remained until 1989. At that time, the side was coached by Portugal's legendary former forward Eusébio, known as the black panther, who highly rated Euzo's defensive ability, leading him to join the team. From his first season with the team, he became a regular squad member, winning the 1988–89 Portuguese league title, and advancing to the final of the 1987–88 European Champions Cup (the predecessor to the current UEFA Champions League); although Elzo played the entire match in Stuttgart, Germany, before 75,000 spectators, he ended up on the losing side, with Benfica finishing as runners-up to PSV Eindhoven, led by Guus Hiddink, in a penalty shoot-out defeat, following a 0–0 draw. He returned to Brazil in 1989, joining Palmeiras for two seasons.

== Honours ==
Ginásio Pinhalense

- Campeonato Paulista: 1979

Internacional

- Campeonato Gaúcho: 1982, 1983 and 1984

Atlético Mineiro

- Campeonato Mineiro: 1985 and 1986

Benfica

- Portuguese Liga: 1988–89
- UEFA European Cup: Runner-up 1987–88

=== Individual ===
- Bola de Prata: 1989 (Palmeiras)
