= Tueba =

Congolese footballer (born 1963)

Personal information
- Full name: Gery Tueba Menayame
- Date of birth: 13 March 1963 (age 63)
- Place of birth: Léopoldville, Congo-Léopoldville
- Height: 1.74 m (5 ft 9 in)
- Position: Midfielder

Senior career*
Years	Team	Apps	(Gls)
1985–1986	Vita Club		
1986–1988	Benfica	28	(2)
1988–1989	Vitória Setúbal	29	(1)
1989–1991	Tirsense	59	(3)
1991–1992	Farense	28	(2)
1992–1993	Gil Vicente	26	(0)
1993–1994	Leixões	26	(0)
1995–1996	Amora	26	(0)
1996–1997	Dragões Sandinenses		
1997–1998	Ourique		
1998–2000	União Santiago		
Total		222	(8)

International career
1987–1992	Zaire	7	(2)
- * Club domestic league appearances and goals

Gery Tueba Menayame (born 13 March 1963), known simply as Tueba, is a Congolese retired footballer who played as a midfielder.

He spent most of his professional career in Portugal, appearing for six different clubs and amassing Primeira Liga totals of 169 matches and eight goals over seven seasons.

== Club career ==
Tueba was born in Kinshasa, Zaire. After arriving in Portugal at age 23 from AS Vita Club, he went on to spend the following decade in the country, starting out with Primeira Liga club S.L. Benfica and helping it to three national accolades during his two-year spell, although he never was an undisputed starter.

Released in summer 1988, after the team lost the final of the European Cup to PSV Eindhoven – he was not picked for the decisive game's squad – Tueba consolidated himself in the Portuguese top flight in the following years, successively representing Vitória de Setúbal, F.C. Tirsense, S.C. Farense and Gil Vicente FC. In 1993, he moved to the second division with Leixões SC, then continued to play in the country until the age of 37, his final years being spent in amateur football.

== International career ==
Tueba represented Zaire at the 1992 African Cup of Nations in Senegal, scoring one goal for the eventual quarter-finalists.

== Honours ==
Benfica

- Primeira Liga: 1986–87
- Taça de Portugal: 1986–87
- Supertaça Cândido de Oliveira: 1986
- European Cup runner-up: 1987–88
