= Carlos Pereira (footballer, born 1962) =

Portuguese footballer

Personal information
- Full name: Carlos Eduardo Deus Pereira
- Date of birth: 25 December 1962 (age 63)
- Place of birth: Lisbon, Portugal
- Height: 1.76 m (5 ft 9 in)
- Position: Right-back

Youth career
- 1976–1978: Sporting
- 1978–1981: Benfica

Senior career*
| Years | Team | Apps | (Gls) |
| 1981–1988 | Benfica | 26 | (0) |
| 1986–1987 | → Farense (loan) | 24 | (1) |
| 1988–1990 | Farense | 20 | (0) |
| 1990–1991 | Olhanense | 3 | (0) |
| Total | | 73 | (1) |

International career
| 1978 | Portugal U16 | 5 | (0) |
| 1980 | Portugal U18 | 9 | (0) |
| 1983 | Portugal U21 | 4 | (0) |
- * Club domestic league appearances and goals

Carlos Eduardo Deus Pereira (born 25 December 1962) is a Portuguese retired footballer who played mainly as a right-back.

Over the course of five seasons, he amassed 70 Primeira Liga matches and one goal.

== Club career ==
Born in Lisbon, a youth graduate from Benfica, he made his debut on 8 November 1981 in an away win over Belenenses. With the right-back position being occupied by Pietra and Veloso, Pereira had very little opportunities to play, being loaned out to Farense in 1986.

In 1988, he moved to Farense, and helped the team reach the 1990 Taça de Portugal Final, lost to Estrela da Amadora. However, having sustained a serious injury in the upper extremity of femur, while still at Benfica, Pereira ended his career abruptly at age 30 in 1991.

After football, he ended up being associated with Farense, as Chairman of the SAD, and also with the Algarve Football Association and Liga Portuguesa de Futebol Profissional.

== International career ==
Pereira amassed 18 caps from under-16 to under-21 level.

== Honours ==
Benfica

- Portuguese League: 1982–83
- Portuguese Cup: 1982–83
