= Richard Mapuata =

Congolese footballer (born 1965)

Personal information
- Full name: Richard Mapuata N'Kiambi Esola
- Date of birth: 27 February 1965 (age 61)
- Place of birth: Léopoldville, DR Congo
- Height: 1.85 m (6 ft 1 in)
- Position: Forward

Senior career*
| Years | Team | Apps | (Gls) |
| –1985 | CS Imana | | |
| 1985–1986 | Standard Liège | | |
| 1986–1988 | Belenenses | 51 | (21) |
| 1988–1990 | Bellinzona | | |
| 1990–1991 | Aarau | | |

International career
- Zaire
- * Club domestic league appearances and goals

Richard Mapuata N'Kiambi Esola (born 27 February 1965) is a Congolese former professional footballer who played as a forward. He represented the Zaire national team at international level.

== Club career ==
Born in Kinshasa, Mapuata began his career with Cercle Sportif Imana. He moved to play in the Belgian Pro League at the age of 20, signing with Standard Liège. One year later, he joined Primeira Liga side Os Belenenses for two seasons. While with Belenenses, Mapuata scored the goal in a famous UEFA Cup victory against Barcelona.

He finished his playing career in the Swiss first division, playing for AC Bellinzona and FC Aarau.

== International career ==
Mapuata played for Zaire at the 1988 Africa Cup of Nations finals.

== Personal life ==
His son, Cédric, is a retired professional footballer.

His other son, Richaross Grüninger, is the star of the SFT Tigers Lugano, known for his skills from three points.
