= 1985–86 Primeira Divisão =

52nd season of top-tier Portuguese football

Primeira Liga
- Season: 1985-86
- Champions: F.C. Porto; 9th title
- Relegated: Desportivo dos Aves; Vitória de Setúbal; Penafiel; Sporting de Covilhã
- European Cup: F.C. Porto (first round)
- Cup Winners' Cup: Benfica (first round)
- UEFA Cup: Sporting CP (first round); Vitória de Guimarães (first round); Boavista (first round)
- Matches: 240
- Goals: 566 (2.36 per match)
- Top goalscorer: Manuel Fernandes (30 goals)

Statistics of Portuguese Liga in the 1985–86 season.

== Overview ==
It was contested by 16 teams, and F.C. Porto won the championship.

== League standings ==
Pos	Team	Pld	W	D	L	GF	GA	GD	Pts	Qualification or relegation
1	Porto (C)	30	22	5	3	64	20	+44	49	Qualification to European Cup first round
2	Benfica	30	21	5	4	54	13	+41	47	Qualification to Cup Winners' Cup first round (Note: Benfica qualified for the Cup Winners' Cup as Portuguese Cup winners)
3	Sporting CP	30	20	6	4	64	20	+44	46	Qualification to UEFA Cup first round
4	Vitória de Guimarães	30	16	8	6	51	29	+22	40	Qualification to UEFA Cup first round
5	Boavista	30	14	8	8	44	29	+15	36	Qualification to UEFA Cup first round
6	Chaves	30	11	7	12	28	38	−10	29	
7	Portimonense	30	11	6	13	29	32	−3	28	
8	Belenenses	30	7	14	9	27	30	−3	28	
9	Braga	30	9	8	13	34	47	−13	26	
10	Académica	30	9	7	14	28	38	−10	25	
11	Salgueiros	30	9	7	14	21	37	−16	25	
12	Marítimo	30	8	6	16	26	50	−24	22	
13	Desportivo das Aves (R)	30	7	8	15	25	42	−17	22	Relegation to Segunda Divisão
14	Vitória de Setúbal (R)	30	7	8	15	32	42	−10	22	Relegation to Segunda Divisão
15	Penafiel (R)	30	4	10	16	16	38	−22	18	Relegation to Segunda Divisão
16	Sporting da Covilhã (R)	30	5	7	18	23	61	−38	17	Relegation to Segunda Divisão

Source: RSSSF
(C) Champions; (R) Relegated

== Results ==
Home \ Away	ACA	BEL	BEN	BOA	BRA	CHA	DAV	MAR	PEN	PTM	POR	SAL	SCP	SCO	VGU	VSE
Académica		0–0	0–1	1–1	1–0	1–1	0–1	1–0	1–0	1–0	1–2	3–0	1–4	4–0	2–0	1–1
Belenenses	1–2		0–1	1–1	3–0	4–1	1–1	0–0	0–0	2–1	2–3	2–1	1–1	3–0	0–0	2–2
Benfica	1–0	1–0		1–0	1–0	4–0	4–0	9–0	2–0	2–0	0–0	5–0	1–2	2–0	3–1	1–1
Boavista	4–0	0–0	1–0		3–1	1–0	5–1	5–2	0–0	1–0	1–2	2–0	2–1	2–1	3–2	2–1
Braga	3–1	0–0	1–1	2–1		1–1	1–1	0–0	2–1	1–0	0–0	0–1	0–2	2–1	1–0	2–2
Chaves	2–0	2–0	0–1	2–1	1–1		2–0	1–0	1–0	1–0	0–2	0–2	0–0	2–2	0–1	4–2
Desportivo das Aves	2–1	0–0	0–1	0–0	2–1	2–3		1–1	2–2	0–0	1–2	3–1	1–2	3–0	0–1	2–0
Marítimo	2–1	3–1	1–2	0–1	3–2	1–0	1–0		1–0	1–1	1–1	0–1	0–0	2–0	0–3	1–0
Penafiel	1–1	0–0	0–2	0–1	3–0	1–1	1–0	1–0		0–1	0–2	0–0	0–1	2–0	1–1	0–1
Portimonense	2–2	2–1	0–3	1–1	2–1	1–0	4–0	1–0	2–0		1–0	2–0	0–1	4–0	1–1	1–0
Porto	3–0	5–0	2–0	1–1	5–1	3–0	2–0	4–2	3–1	4–0		2–0	2–1	4–2	1–0	5–0
Salgueiros	2–0	0–2	1–1	1–0	0–2	3–0	1–2	1–0	0–0	1–0	1–1		2–2	0–2	0–3	1–0
Sporting CP	2–0	0–0	0–0	2–0	4–0	3–0	1–0	3–0	6–0	4–2	0–1	2–1		6–1	3–0	1–0
Sporting da Covilhã	0–1	0–0	1–2	1–1	1–3	1–2	2–0	2–1	1–1	1–0	2–0	0–0	0–5		0–0	1–1
Vitória de Guimarães	1–1	3–0	2–1	2–1	5–3	0–0	2–0	4–1	2–1	3–0	2–1	0–0	4–3	5–0		1–0
Vitória de Setúbal	1–0	0–2	0–1	3–2	1–3	0–1	0–0	4–2	4–0	0–0	0–1	2–0	1–2	3–1	2–2	

Legend: Blue = home team win; Yellow = draw; Red = away team win.

== Season statistics ==
=== Top goalscorers ===
Rank	Player	Club	Goals
1	(Portugal) Manuel Fernandes	Sporting	30
2	(Brazil) Paulinho Cascavel	Vitória de Guimarães	25
3	(Portugal) Fernando Gomes	Porto	20
4	(Portugal) Armando	Salgueiros	14
4	(Denmark) Michael Manniche	Benfica	14
6	(Belgium) Serge Cadorin	Portimonense	13
7	(Algeria) Rabah Madjer	Porto	12
8	(Portugal) Rui Águas	Benfica	10
8	(Brazil) César	Vitória de Setúbal	10
8	(Portugal) Fernando Cruz	Vitória de Setúbal	10

== Attendances ==
#	Club	Average
1	Benfica	50,667
2	Porto	45,000
3	Sporting	36,667
4	Vitória SC	17,333
5	Os Belenenses	13,867
6	Marítimo	13,800
7	Boavista	13,633
8	Braga	13,333
9	Chaves	13,333
10	Vitória FC	11,533
11	Académica	11,067
12	Salgueiros	10,333
13	Aves	9,867
14	Portimonense	8,867
15	Penafiel	8,867
16	Sporting da Covilhã	8,133
