= Manuel Bento =

Portuguese footballer

- Bento in Benfica

Personal information
- Full name: Manuel Galrinho Bento
- Date of birth: 25 June 1948
- Place of birth: Golegã, Portugal
- Date of death: 1 March 2007 (aged 58)
- Place of death: Barreiro, Portugal
- Height: 1.73 m (5 ft 8 in)
- Position: Goalkeeper

Youth career
- Riachense
- Goleganense
- Sporting CP

Senior career*
Years	Team	Apps	(Gls)
1966–1972	Barreirense	94	(0)
1972–1992	Benfica	330	(0)
1989	Toronto First Portuguese		
Total		424	(0)

International career
1976–1986	Portugal	63	(0)
Medal record
Men's football
Representing Portugal
UEFA European Championship
Bronze medal – third place	1984 France
- * Club domestic league appearances and goals

Manuel Galrinho Bento (25 June 1948 – 1 March 2007) was a Portuguese professional footballer who played as a goalkeeper.

Bento was best known for his 20-year spell at Benfica, having retired well into his 40s after appearing in nearly 650 official games. He represented Portugal at Euro 1984 and the 1986 World Cup, helping the national team reach the semi-finals in the former tournament.

Chosen by Portuguese sports newspaper Record as one of the best 100 Portuguese footballers, Bento won the Goalkeeper of the Year award a best-ever eight times. In January 2015, he was chosen by the UEFA website as one of Europe's favourite goalkeepers.

== Club career ==
Bento was born in Golegã, Santarém District. After various youth spells, including one with Sporting CP, he started professionally at F.C. Barreirense, being transferred to S.L. Benfica for the 1972–73 season.

Bento started with Benfica as a backup to another Portuguese keeper, José Henrique. After three years in an interesting battle for first-choice status, the former gained the starting position in 1976 at age 28, and proceeded to amass 636 overall appearances for the Lisbon side.

Bento suffered a severe injury in the 1986 summer on international duty, from which he never recovered fully. He spent the next six years mainly as third-string, behind Silvino and Neno, being on the bench at both the 1988 and 1990 European Cup finals, lost to PSV Eindhoven and A.C. Milan respectively; the last game of his career came at the end of the 1989–90 campaign against C.F. Os Belenenses, in which he was chosen Man of the match. In the summer of 1989 he played in the National Soccer League with Toronto First Portuguese.

In June 1992, aged 44, Bento retired from football after exactly 20 years at Benfica – he was the oldest footballer ever to appear in the Portuguese first division. Subsequently, he began working as a goalkeeper coach, always with his main club.

Bento died in the hospital of Barreiro on 1 March 2007, after suffering a heart attack. He was 58 years old.

== International career ==
Bento earned 63 caps for Portugal, over the course of one decade. He made his debut on 16 October 1976 in the 1978 FIFA World Cup qualifying campaign's opener, a 0–2 defeat against Poland in Porto.

Bento remained first-choice for the following nine years, being between the posts as the national team reached the semi-finals at UEFA Euro 1984, excelling in the 2–3 loss against the hosts France. He also started in the epic 1–0 win in West Germany for the 1986 World Cup qualifiers, being subsequently picked for the final stages in Mexico at age 38: he appeared in the first game against England (another single-goal success), then broke his fibula in training, being replaced for the remainder of the tournament by Sporting's Vítor Damas; Portugal lost the next two matches and were eliminated from the knockout stages.

== Honours ==
Benfica

- Primeira Divisão (8): 1972–73, 1974–75, 1975–76, 1976–77, 1980–81, 1982–83, 1983–84, 1986–87
- Taça de Portugal (5): 1979–80, 1980–81, 1982–83, 1984–85, 1985–86
- Supertaça Cândido de Oliveira (2): 1980, 1985
- Taça de Honra (6)

Individual

- Portuguese Footballer of the Year: 1977
