= Michael Manniche =

Danish footballer (born 1959)

Personal information
- Date of birth: 17 July 1959 (age 67)
- Place of birth: Copenhagen, Denmark
- Height: 1.92 m (6 ft 4 in)
- Position: Centre forward

Youth career
- 1971–1977: Brønshøj

Senior career*
Years	Team	Apps	(Gls)
1977–1979	Brønshøj	47	(20)
1980–1983	Hvidovre	77	(23)
1983–1987	Benfica	89	(47)
1987–1992	B 1903	128	(47)
1992–1994	FC Copenhagen	37	(7)
1996	FC Copenhagen	3	(0)
Total		381	(144)

International career
1981–1987	Denmark	11	(2)
- * Club domestic league appearances and goals

Michael Manniche (born 17 July 1959) is a Danish former professional footballer who played as a centre forward.

Even though he played professionally for four clubs in his country, he was best known for his spell with Benfica in Portugal.

== Career ==
Born in Copenhagen, Frederiksberg Municipality, Manniche started his career with Brønshøj Boldklub in 1977, signing for Hvidovre IF three years later and helping it to the Danish Cup in 1980 and the Danish Championship in the following year; in August he made his debut with Denmark, appearing as a second-half substitute in a friendly with Nordic neighbours Finland (2–1 win) – in total, he would win 11 caps in six years, but did not attend any major international tournament.

In the middle of 1983, Manniche moved abroad, signing with defending Primeira Liga champions S.L. Benfica. In his first season he helped the team retain the championship, scoring 11 goals in only 21 matches. Additionally, he netted twice in the 1985 Portuguese Cup final win against FC Porto (3–1), winning another league trophy in 1987.

Having played 132 official matches with 75 goals for Benfica, Manniche was affectionately known as "O Tosco" (Portuguese slang for a person/player with few or no technical abilities). In the decades following his retirement he stayed firmly connected to the club, either watching games, mediating in business negotiations or supplying training equipment.

In 1987, 28-year-old Manniche returned home, joining Boldklubben 1903 – on 1 July 1992, it merged with Kjøbenhavns Boldklub to become F.C. Copenhagen. In its first year of existence, they won the league; he played his last match on 17 April 1994, and became a coach for small Danish amateur sides.

Manniche returned to Copenhagen in 1996, as an assistant manager. After a string of poor results he made a short comeback as a player, at the age of 37, calling it quits shortly after.

The Portuguese footballer Maniche was nicknamed in reference to Manniche.

== Honours ==
Hvidovre

- Danish Superliga: 1981
- Danish Cup: 1980

Benfica

- Primeira Liga: 1983–84, 1986–87
- Taça de Portugal: 1984–85, 1985–86, 1986–87
- Supertaça Cândido de Oliveira: 1985

FC Copenhagen

- Danish Superliga: 1992–93
