= Mário Jorge (footballer) =

Portuguese footballer

Personal information
- Full name: Mário Jorge da Silva Pinho Fernandes
- Date of birth: 24 August 1961 (age 65)
- Place of birth: Ponta Delgada, Portugal
- Position: Midfielder

Youth career
- 1974–1980: Sporting CP

Senior career*
Years	Team	Apps	(Gls)
1979–1989	Sporting CP	182	(13)
1989–1990	Beira-Mar	23	(1)
1990–1991	Sporting CP	8	(1)
1991–1993	Estrela Amadora	14	(1)
1994–1995	Estoril	8	(0)
Total		235	(16)

International career
1983–1987	Portugal	9	(0)
- * Club domestic league appearances and goals

Mário Jorge da Silva Pinho Fernandes (born 24 August 1961), known as Mário Jorge, is a Portuguese former professional footballer who played as a left midfielder.

== Club career ==
Born in Ponta Delgada, Azores, Mário Jorge made his professional debut with Sporting CP at the age of 18, appearing in one match in 1979–80 as the Lisbon club won the Primeira Liga championship. He was already an important midfield player as the team conquered it again two seasons later, the last for the following 18 years.

After only 12 games in 1988–89, Mário Jorge left Sporting and signed for S.C. Beira-Mar in the same league, but returned to where he had come from at the end of the campaign, again being rarely used. He concluded his career in 1995 after stints with two other sides from the capital, C.F. Estrela da Amadora and G.D. Estoril Praia, both in the Segunda Liga; he later worked as sporting director at the latter.

== International career ==
Mário Jorge earned nine caps for Portugal, seven of those coming after the 1986 FIFA World Cup following the defection of practically all of the national team squad due to the infamous Saltillo Affair. His debut, however, took place on 8 June 1983, when he featured the full 90 minutes in a 4–0 friendly loss against Brazil in Coimbra.
