= Samuel Quina =

Portuguese footballer

Samuel
Personal information
- Full name: Samuel António da Silva Tavares Quina
- Date of birth: 3 August 1966 (age 60)
- Place of birth: Bissau, Guinea
- Height: 1.78 m (5 ft 10 in)
- Position: Defender

Youth career
- 1981–1984: Benfica

Senior career*
Years	Team	Apps	(Gls)
1983–1991	Benfica	113	(1)
1991–1992	Boavista	34	(0)
1992–1993	Benfica	4	(0)
1993–1995	Vitória Guimarães	25	(0)
1995–1996	Tirsense	8	(0)
1996–1997	Odivelas	13	(0)
1997–1999	Fanhões	25	(0)
Total		222	(1)

International career
1984	Portugal U16	2	(0)
1984	Portugal U18	8	(0)
1984–1986	Portugal U21	12	(0)
1991–1992	Portugal	5	(0)
- * Club domestic league appearances and goals

Samuel António da Silva Tavares Quina (born 3 August 1966), known simply as Samuel, is a Portuguese former professional footballer.

Having played mostly for Benfica in the late 1980s and early 1990s, he operated mainly as a central defender.

== Club career ==
Born in Bissau, Portuguese Guinea, Samuel was a product of S.L. Benfica's academy, and made his debut with the first team on 30 December 1983 (aged 17) after being brought on as a substitute by manager Sven-Göran Eriksson in a 4–0 home win over G.D. Chaves in the Taça de Portugal. His only Primeira Liga goal came in a 2–2 away draw against S.C. Braga, and he went on to have a somewhat important role in the Lisbon club for seven seasons.

Samuel started the final of the 1989–90 European Cup against AC Milan. He was deployed as a left-back in the 1–0 loss in Vienna.

After winning the 1991–92 Portuguese Cup with Boavista FC, Samuel returned to Benfica. His last game for the latter was a 1–0 victory at Louletano D.C. on 29 November 1992 and he was released at the end of the campaign, going on to represent Vitória de Guimarães, F.C. Tirsense, Odivelas F.C. and SL Fanhões.

== International career ==
Over nine months, Samuel earned five caps for Portugal. His debut was on 4 September 1991, in a 1–1 friendly draw with Austria in Porto.

== Personal life ==
Samuel's son, Domingos, represented Portugal at youth level and played professionally for several clubs, starting out at West Ham United.

== Honours ==
Benfica

- Primeira Liga: 1986–87, 1988–89, 1990–91
- Taça de Portugal: 1984–85, 1985–86, 1986–87, 1992–93
- Supertaça Cândido de Oliveira: 1985, 1989
- European Cup runner-up: 1987–88, 1989–90

Boavista

- Taça de Portugal: 1991–92
