= Dito (footballer) =

Portuguese footballer and manager (1962–2020)

Personal information
- Full name: Eduardo José Gomes Cameselle Mendez
- Date of birth: 18 January 1962
- Place of birth: Barcelos, Portugal
- Date of death: 3 September 2020 (aged 58)
- Place of death: Monção, Portugal
- Height: 1.83 m (6 ft 0 in)
- Position: Centre-back

Youth career
- Alheira FC
- 1976–1977: Gil Vicente
- 1977–1980: Braga

Senior career*
Years	Team	Apps	(Gls)
1980–1986	Braga	159	(13)
1986–1988	Benfica	55	(1)
1988–1989	Porto	13	(0)
1989–1992	Vitória Setúbal	67	(0)
1992–1993	Espinho	32	(1)
1993–1994	Gil Vicente	32	(0)
1994–1995	Torreense	20	(1)
1995–1996	Ovarense	5	(0)
Total		383	(16)

International career
1981–1983	Portugal U21	11	(2)
1981–1987	Portugal	17	(1)

Managerial career
- 1997: Esposende
- 1998–1999: Salgueiros
- 2000: Chaves
- 2000–2001: Felgueiras
- 2003–2004: Portimonense
- 2005–2006: Ribeirão
- 2006–2007: Moreirense
- 2008–2010: Braga (youth)
- 2011–2012: Varzim
- 2017–2018: Famalicão
- 2018: Covilhã
- * Club domestic league appearances and goals

Eduardo José Gomes Cameselle Mendez (18 January 1962 – 3 September 2020), known as Dito, was a Portuguese football central defender and manager.

== Playing career ==
=== Club ===
Dito was born in Barcelos. He appeared in 358 Primeira Liga matches over 16 professional seasons, starting his career with S.C. Braga for which he was already an important first-team member at the age of 18, and signing for S.L. Benfica in 1986 after six years in Minho.

In his two-season spell with Benfica, Dito played 27 league games in his first year as the Lisbon club won the double, then partnered Carlos Mozer in the second (no silverware won). He then moved to rivals and title holders FC Porto for one season, with Benfica regaining their domestic supremacy at the expense of precisely the northerners.

From 1989 to 1994, always in the top division, Dito represented Vitória de Setúbal, S.C. Espinho and Gil Vicente FC. After a brief stint with A.D. Ovarense in the Segunda Liga, he retired from football aged 34.

=== International ===
Dito won 17 caps for Portugal, his debut arriving on 28 October 1981 at the age of 19 as he came on as a 46th-minute substitute for Humberto Coelho in a 4–1 away loss against Israel for the 1982 FIFA World Cup qualifiers. He did not attend any major international tournament, however.

On 23 February 1983, Dito scored the only goal in the friendly defeat of West Germany in the Portuguese capital, which marked the first-ever victory over that opposition.

Dito: International goals
No.	Date	Venue	Opponent	Score	Result	Competition
1	23 February 1983	Estádio do Restelo, Lisbon, Portugal	West Germany	1–0	1–0	Friendly

== Coaching career ==
Dito's biggest achievement as a coach was managing S.C. Salgueiros over the course of three top-flight campaigns, being dismissed after the tenth round of 1999–2000 as the Paranhos team eventually retained their status. In 2009 he returned to his first club Braga, being appointed at the junior sides.

In July 2011, having guided the Braga District to the UEFA Regions' Cup, Dito returned to the senior game with Varzim S.C. of the third tier. He fulfilled his aim of winning promotion, doing so as champions in his only season, but then quit due to disputes with the board including an alleged four-month backlog in wages.

On 5 April 2017, Dito came back to the professional game after over a decade's hiatus, taking over F.C. Famalicão for the rest of the second division season. The following 22 January, he left by mutual consent.

Dito was hired by S.C. Covilhã of the same league on 27 May 2018. He left on 9 October, again by agreement between both parties, with the side second bottom.

In the 2019 off-season, Dito was appointed general manager at hometown club Gil Vicente FC, recently returned to the top tier.

== Personal life ==
Dito's father, Spaniard Eduardo Cameselle Mendez, played for Gil Vicente in the 1950s. His nephew, also named Eduardo, was also a footballer.

On 3 September 2020, as he was watching Gil Vicente in pre-season training in Melgaço, Dito suffered a heart attack and died shortly after at the Monção Hospital.

== Honours ==
=== Player ===
Braga

- Taça de Portugal runner-up: 1981–82

Benfica

- Primeira Liga: 1986–87
- Taça de Portugal: 1986–87
- Supertaça Cândido de Oliveira runner-up: 1986, 1987

Porto

- Supertaça Cândido de Oliveira runner-up: 1988

=== Manager ===
Varzim

- Segunda Divisão: 2011–12
