= António Oliveira (footballer, born 1958) =

Portuguese footballer

Personal information
- Full name: António Henriques Fonseca de Jesus Oliveira
- Date of birth: 8 June 1958 (age 68)
- Place of birth: Moita, Portugal
- Height: 1.87 m (6 ft 2 in)
- Position: Sweeper

Youth career
- 1974–1976: 1º Maio Sarilhense
- 1976–1978: Rosairense

Senior career*
Years	Team	Apps	(Gls)
1978–1980	CUF	30	(3)
1980–1982	Quimigal	49	(4)
1982–1983	Marítimo	30	(1)
1983–1987	Benfica	98	(3)
1987–1990	Marítimo	91	(9)
1990–1994	Beira-Mar	133	(1)
Total		431	(21)

International career
1983–1989	Portugal	9	(1)
- * Club domestic league appearances and goals

António Henriques Fonseca de Jesus Oliveira (born 8 June 1958) is a Portuguese former professional footballer who played as a sweeper.

== Club career ==
Born in Moita, Setúbal District, Oliveira made his Primeira Liga debut at already 24, with C.S. Marítimo, after several seasons in the second division with G.D. Fabril (under two different denominations). Even though the Madeira side were relegated from the top level at the end of the 1982–83 campaign, he was immediately bought by S.L. Benfica.

With the Lisbon-based club, Oliveira started in two out of his four seasons, helping it to two leagues and three domestic cups. He subsequently returned to Marítimo, where he would play until 1990.

Oliveira then moved to another team in the top flight, Aveiro's S.C. Beira-Mar, and retired at the end of 1993–94 at the age of 36 having amassed top flight totals of 352 games and 14 goals.

== International career ==
Oliveira earned nine caps for Portugal, his debut coming on 8 June 1983 – the day of his 25th birthday – in a 0–4 friendly loss to Brazil in Coimbra. He was a member of the team that competed in the 1986 FIFA World Cup in Mexico, playing all 3 group games against England, Poland and Morocco, as they exited in the group stage.

Oliveira's last match was played on 26 March 1989 in a 3–1 win against Switzerland in Lisbon, for the 1990 World Cup qualifiers.

== Honours ==
Benfica

- Primeira Liga: 1983–84, 1986–87
- Taça de Portugal: 1984–85, 1985–86, 1986–87
- Supertaça Cândido de Oliveira: 1985
