= Wando (footballer, born 1963) =

Brazilian footballer

Personal information
- Full name: Geovânio Bonfim Sobrinho
- Date of birth: 13 March 1963 (age 63)
- Place of birth: Rio de Janeiro, Brazil
- Height: 1.80 m (5 ft 11 in)
- Position: Winger

Youth career
- 1981–1982: Vasco da Gama

Senior career*
Years	Team	Apps	(Gls)
1982–1984	Braga	51	(10)
1984–1989	Benfica	91	(12)
1988–1989	→ Vitória Setúbal (loan)	29	(2)
1989–1991	Marítimo	54	(2)
1991–1992	Calheta		
1992–1993	Konyaspor	4	(0)
1994	XV de Jaú		
Total		229	(26)
- * Club domestic league appearances and goals

Geovânio Bonfim Sobrinho (born 13 March 1963), commonly known as Wando, is a Brazilian retired professional footballer who played as a left winger.

Over nine seasons, he amassed Primeira Liga totals of 225 matches and 26 goals, mainly with Benfica.

== Club career ==
Born in Rio de Janeiro, Wando arrived in Portugal at only 19 and started playing with S.C. Braga. After two solid seasons in Minho, he signed for fellow Primeira Liga club S.L. Benfica, becoming an important attacking weapon as the latter won one league (1987), three cups (1985 to 1987) and one supercup (1985).

After four seasons being regularly used, whether as a starter or substitute, and with competitive totals of 139 games and 23 goals, Wando left Benfica and spent three more years in the country – always in the top division – with Vitória de Setúbal and C.S. Marítimo (two seasons). He retired in 1994 at 31, following spells with Turkish side Konyaspor and Esporte Clube XV de Novembro (Jaú) back in his home country.
