= Adelino Nunes =

Portuguese footballer

Personal information
- Full name: Adelino Carlos Morais Nunes
- Date of birth: 6 September 1960 (age 66)
- Place of birth: Manteigas, Portugal
- Height: 1.78 m (5 ft 10 in)
- Position: Defensive midfielder

Youth career
- Vinhense
- 1978–1979: Barreirense

Senior career*
Years	Team	Apps	(Gls)
1979–1982	Barreirense	43	(1)
1982–1984	Vitória Setúbal	58	(2)
1984–1988	Benfica	74	(10)
1988–1990	Marítimo	44	(3)
1990–1995	Vitória Setúbal	92	(6)
1995–1997	Desportivo Beja	44	(4)
Total		355	(26)

International career
1983–1991	Portugal	18	(2)
- * Club domestic league appearances and goals

Adelino Carlos Morais Nunes (born 6 September 1960) is a retired Portuguese footballer who played as a defensive midfielder.

== Club career ==
Nunes was born in Manteigas, Guarda District. During 18 seasons as a professional, he played mainly for Vitória de Setúbal (seven seasons in two separate spells). In the 1984 summer, after the first stint at the Sado River side, he signed for top division giants S.L. Benfica, being a relatively important member of the teams that won the 1987 national championship – with the player contributing with 24 games and a career-best eight goals, including a brace in a 2–0 away win against S.C. Farense on 1 February 1987 – and three consecutive domestic cups.

In 1990, after two years with C.S. Marítimo, 30-year-old Nunes returned to Setúbal, suffering relegation in his first year but helping Vitória return to the top flight in his third, already as a fringe player however. He closed out his career at nearly 37 after two years with C.D. Beja (second level), where he reunited with former Setúbal teammate Hernâni Neves; over the course of 11 seasons, he amassed top division totals of 228 matches and 19 goals.

== International career ==
Nunes gained 18 caps for Portugal, scoring twice. Most of his appearances came following the 1986 FIFA World Cup, as most of the internationals defected the national team after the infamous Saltillo Affair in Mexico.

Adelino Nunes: International goals
No.	Date	Venue	Opponent	Score	Result	Competition
1	25 January 1989	Olympic Stadium (Athens), Athens, Greece	Greece	0–1	1–2	Friendly
2	29 March 1989	Estádio José Alvalade (1956), Lisbon, Portugal	Angola	4–0	6–0	Friendly

== Honours ==
Benfica

- Portuguese League: 1986–87
- Portuguese Cup: 1984–85, 1985–86, 1986–87
- Portuguese Supercup: 1985
- European Cup: Runner-up 1987–88
