= Rui Águas (footballer) =

Portuguese footballer (born 1960)

Personal information
- Full name: José Rui Lopes Águas
- Date of birth: 28 April 1960 (age 66)
- Place of birth: Lisbon, Portugal
- Height: 1.79 m (5 ft 10 in)
- Position: Striker

Youth career
- 1972–1974: Benfica
- 1974–1977: CAC Pontinha
- 1977–1978: Sporting CP

Senior career*
Years	Team	Apps	(Gls)
1979–1980	Real Benfica		
1980–1982	Sesimbra		
1982–1983	Atlético	22	(2)
1983–1985	Portimonense	46	(10)
1985–1988	Benfica	74	(35)
1988–1990	Porto	64	(30)
1990–1994	Benfica	99	(42)
1994	Estrela Amadora	9	(4)
1995	Reggiana	12	(0)
Total		326	(123)

International career
1985–1993	Portugal	31	(10)

Managerial career
- 1996–1997: Portugal (assistant)
- 1999–2000: Estoril
- 2000: Vitória Setúbal
- 2002–2003: Marítimo (assistant)
- 2003–2006: Braga (assistant)
- 2014–2016: Cape Verde
- 2017–2018: Pharco
- 2018–2019: Cape Verde
- 2020: Santos (assistant)
- 2020–2021: Boavista (assistant)
- 2022–2023: Zamalek (assistant)
- 2023: Zamalek (assistant)
- * Club domestic league appearances and goals

José Rui Lopes Águas (born 28 April 1960) is a Portuguese professional football coach and former player who played as a striker.

He had highly successful spells at two of the biggest clubs in Portugal, Benfica and Porto, amassing Primeira Liga totals of 292 games and 121 goals over 12 seasons.

Águas represented the Portugal national team at the 1986 World Cup.

== Playing career ==
=== Club ===
Born in Lisbon, Águas started his career with amateurs Real Desportivo Benfica, and later went on to represent G.D. Sesimbra in the Terceira Divisão and Atlético Clube de Portugal in Segunda Divisão. He turned professional in the 1983–84 season, when he signed for Portimonense S.C. of the Primeira Liga.

Moving to S.L. Benfica in 1985, Águas scored an average of 12 goals in his first spell, helping the capital club to the league on three occasions. He was present at the 1988 European Cup final, as they lost 6–5 on penalties to PSV Eindhoven.

Águas joined FC Porto in summer 1988, winning the league in his second year and contributing to the conquest with 17 goals. However, he returned to Benfica after only two years, and proceeded to net a career-best 25 times in the first season upon his return as the team finished in top position. In the last round against S.C. Beira-Mar, the game after they had been crowned champions, he bagged two second-half goals in an eventual 3–0 home win, narrowly edging Porto's Domingos – who played first and scored four in a 5–0 victory over Vitória de Guimarães, finishing with 24 – in the Bola de Prata race.

In the last edition of the European Cup, Águas suffered an horrific foot injury against FC Dynamo Kyiv, but still managed five league goals in only 14 matches. Already 34, he moved clubs but stayed in Lisbon, joining lowly C.F. Estrela da Amadora. His career ended after an abroad spell which was his first and only at the age of 34, at Italy's AC Reggiana 1919.

=== International ===
Águas played his first match for Portugal on 3 April 1985, a 2–0 loss to Italy in a friendly. He was present at the 1986 FIFA World Cup, playing as a substitute in the 3–1 defeat against Morocco.

In total, Águas received 31 caps for the national team, scoring ten goals. His last game was for the 1994 World Cup qualifiers on 17 November 1993, losing to Italy 1–0.

== Coaching career ==
In the early 2000s, Águas coached Vitória F.C. and acted as assistant at C.S. Marítimo and S.C. Braga. He managed six wins, three draws and nine losses for the first side in the 1999–2000 campaign, which ended in top-division relegation.

Águas was named Cape Verde coach in August 2014, replacing interim Men Ramires and signing a two-year contract. He led them to three draws in the 2015 Africa Cup of Nations, in an eventual group phase elimination. He resigned from his position on 1 January 2016, alleging unpaid wages.

In February 2017, Águas was part of a candidate shortlist for the vacant Rwanda national team manager role. He returned to the Cape Verde helm in May of the following year.

Águas returned to club duties in late December 2019, being included in his compatriot Jesualdo Ferreira's staff at Santos FC of the Campeonato Brasileiro Série A.

== Personal life ==
Águas' father, José, was a stellar footballer (also striker) for Benfica, mainly in the 1950s. He had two siblings, his sister Maria Helena (known as Lena d'Água) having a prolific career in the country's pop music. His cousin, Raul Águas, was also a footballer and manager for several years.

Águas met his wife, Leonor, in college as they were from the same class. They fathered three children, son André (born in 1985), daughter Mariana (1987, who went on to work as a reporter at CMTV) and son Martim (1993) who was also a footballer.

== Career statistics ==
=== Club ===
Appearances and goals by club, season and competition
Club	Season	League			Cup		Continental		Other		Total	
Club	Season	Division	Apps	Goals	Apps	Goals	Apps	Goals	Apps	Goals	Apps	Goals
Portimonense	1983–84	Primeira Divisão	26	3	1	0	—		—		27	3
Portimonense	1984–85	Primeira Divisão	20	7	—		—		—		20	7
Portimonense	Total		46	10	1	0	—		—		47	10
Benfica	1985–86	Primeira Divisão	22	10	8	6	3 (Note: Appearances in UEFA Cup Winners' Cup)	1	—		33	17
Benfica	1986–87	Primeira Divisão	27	13	6	6	3	1	2 (Note: Appearances in Supertaça Cândido de Oliveira)	0	38	20
Benfica	1987–88	Primeira Divisão	25	12	3	2	8 (Note: Appearances in European Cup)	4	2	0	38	18
Benfica	Total		74	35	17	14	14	6	4	0	109	55
Porto	1988–89	Primeira Divisão	33	13	3	1	3	2	2	0	41	16
Porto	1989–90	Primeira Divisão	31	17	3	4	5 (Note: Appearances in UEFA Cup)	3	—		39	24
Porto	Total		64	30	6	5	8	5	2	0	80	40
Benfica	1990–91	Primeira Divisão	37	25	3	1	2	0	—		42	26
Benfica	1991–92	Primeira Divisão	14	5	1	0	3	1	0	0	18	6
Benfica	1992–93	Primeira Divisão	23	6	6	2	4	0	1	0	34	8
Benfica	1993–94	Primeira Divisão	25	6	3	1	4	1	2	1	34	9
Benfica	Total		99	42	13	4	13	2	3	1	128	49
Estrela Amadora	1994–95	Primeira Divisão	9	4	—		—		—		9	4
Reggiana	1994–95	Serie A	12	0	—		—		—		12	0
Career total			304	121	37	23	35	13	9	1	385	158

=== International ===
Appearances and goals by national team and year
National team	Year	Apps	Goals
Portugal	1985	1	0
Portugal	1986	3	0
Portugal	1987	1	0
Portugal	1989	8	4
Portugal	1990	3	2
Portugal	1991	7	2
Portugal	1992	1	0
Portugal	1993	7	2
Total		31	10

Scores and results list Portugal's goal tally first, score column indicates score after each Águas goal.

List of international goals scored by Rui Águas
No.	Date	Venue	Opponent	Score	Result	Competition
1	20 September 1989	Stade de la Maladière, Neuchâtel, Switzerland	Switzerland	2–1	2–1	1990 World Cup qualification
2	6 October 1989	Generali Arena, Prague, Czechoslovakia	Czechoslovakia	1–1	1–2	1990 World Cup qualification
3	11 October 1989	Ludwigsparkstadion, Saarbrücken, West Germany	Luxembourg	1–0	3–0	1990 World Cup qualification
4	11 October 1989	Ludwigsparkstadion, Saarbrücken, West Germany	Luxembourg	2–0	3–0	1990 World Cup qualification
5	29 August 1990	Estádio da Luz (1954), Lisbon, Portugal	West Germany	1–1	1–1	Friendly
6	17 October 1990	Estádio das Antas, Porto, Portugal	Netherlands	1–0	1–0	Euro 1992 qualifying
7	23 January 1991	Olympic Stadium (Athens), Athens, Greece	Greece	1–1	2–3	Euro 1992 qualifying
8	20 February 1991	Estádio das Antas, Porto, Portugal	Malta	1–0	5–0	Euro 1992 qualifying
9	24 January 1993	Ta' Qali National Stadium, Ta' Qali, Malta	Malta	1–0	1–0	1994 World Cup qualification
10	10 November 1993	Estádio da Luz (1954), Lisbon, Portugal	Estonia	3–0	3–0	1994 World Cup qualification

== Managerial statistics ==
As of 27 December 2019.

Managerial record by team and tenure
Team	Nat.	From	To	Record								Ref
Team	Nat.	From	To	G	W	D	L	GF	GA	GD	Win %	Ref
Estoril	(Portugal)	August 1999	January 2000	18	8	5	5	35	22	+13	44.44	
Vitória Setúbal	(Portugal)	16 January 2000	October 2000	24	8	5	11	19	28	−9	33.33	
Cape Verde	(Cape Verde)	August 2014	1 January 2016	16	9	4	3	27	13	+14	56.25	
Cape Verde	(Cape Verde)	May 2018	December 2019	12	3	6	3	12	11	+1	25.00	
Career total				70	28	20	22	93	74	+19	40.00	—

== Honours ==
Benfica

- Primeira Liga: 1986–87, 1990–91, 1993–94
- Taça de Portugal: 1985–86, 1986–87, 1992–93
- Supertaça Cândido de Oliveira: 1985
- European Cup runner-up: 1987–88

Porto

- Primeira Liga: 1989–90
- Supertaça Cândido de Oliveira runner-up: 1988

Individual

- Primeira Liga top scorer: 1990–91
- European Cup top scorer: 1987–88
- Taça de Portugal top scorer: 1985–86

== See also ==
- List of association football families
