= Álvaro Magalhães =

Portuguese football manager and former player

Álvaro
Personal information
- Full name: Álvaro Monteiro Magalhães
- Date of birth: 3 January 1961 (age 65)
- Place of birth: Lamego, Portugal
- Height: 1.80 m (5 ft 11 in)
- Position: Left-back

Youth career
- 1975–1978: Cracks Lamego
- 1978–1979: Académica

Senior career*
Years	Team	Apps	(Gls)
1979–1981	Académica	56	(1)
1981–1990	Benfica	177	(6)
1990–1991	Estrela Amadora	19	(0)
1991–1993	Leixões	41	(0)
Total		293	(7)

International career
1981–1988	Portugal	20	(0)

Managerial career
- 1994–1997: Lusitânia
- 1997–1998: Santa Clara
- 1998: Chaves
- 1998–2000: Gil Vicente
- 2000–2001: Vitória Guimarães
- 2001–2002: Estrela Amadora
- 2002–2003: Naval
- 2003–2005: Benfica (assistant)
- 2005–2006: Naval
- 2006–2008: Olhanense
- 2008: Feirense
- 2008: Covilhã
- 2008: Gloria Buzău
- 2009–2011: Interclube
- 2012: Nacional Benguela
- 2012–2013: Naval
- 2013–2014: Tondela
- 2016–2017: Gil Vicente
- 2019: Farense
Medal record
Men's football
Representing Portugal
UEFA European Championship
Bronze medal – third place	1984 France
- * Club domestic league appearances and goals

Álvaro Monteiro Magalhães (born 3 January 1961), known simply as Álvaro as a player, is a Portuguese former professional footballer who played as a left-back.

In 11 seasons in the Primeira Liga, he appeared in 224 matches and scored six goals. He spent nine years of his career with Benfica, winning ten major titles.

Magalhães represented Portugal at the 1986 World Cup and Euro 1984. In 1994, he began working as a manager.

== Club career ==
Born in Lamego, Viseu District, Álvaro made his Primeira Liga debut in 1980 with Académica de Coimbra, moving subsequently to S.L. Benfica. After two seasons he became first choice, as the Lisbon club went on to win four leagues and as many Taça de Portugal (three consecutive in the latter competition) while making more than 200 official appearances.

In June 1990, after only totalling 13 games in his last two seasons – Benfica also appeared in two European Cup finals during that timeframe, but he was only a fringe player – Álvaro left and signed with neighbours C.F. Estrela da Amadora, helping the team to the second round of the UEFA Cup Winners' Cup; however, the league ended in relegation. He closed out his career at the age of 32 in the Segunda Liga, with Leixões SC.

One year after retiring, Magalhães began a coaching career, working with several first and second-division teams. His first experience at the former level was with G.D. Chaves in 1997–98, narrowly avoiding relegation.

From 2003 to 2005, Magalhães was assistant manager at Benfica under José Antonio Camacho and Giovanni Trapattoni respectively, winning the league title in the second season. In the latter part of the decade he had spells in Romania and Angola, being Girabola champion with G.D. Interclube for the second time in the Luanda club's history.

Magalhães signed a new two-year contract in November 2009 but, on 29 March 2011, he was relieved of his duties. In early February 2012, he was appointed coach of Clube Nacional de Benguela in the same country and league; soon after, he returned to Portuguese football, signing with Associação Naval 1º de Maio, which he had already managed in 2005–06's top flight and 2002–03's second tier.

== International career ==
Álvaro was capped 20 times for Portugal, making his debut on 16 December 1981 in a 5–2 friendly defeat against Bulgaria. He was picked for UEFA Euro 1984 and the 1986 FIFA World Cup.

After the infamous Saltillo Affair at the 1986 World Cup, Álvaro was one of the few players to not defect from the national team; his last international appearance came on 16 November 1988 in a 1–0 win over Luxembourg for the 1990 World Cup qualifiers in Porto.

== Personal life ==
Magalhães was born with polydactylism in his left hand, and was nicknamed Seis dedos (six fingers) due to this condition.

== Honours ==
=== Player ===
Benfica

- Primeira Liga: 1982–83, 1983–84, 1986–87, 1988–89
- Taça de Portugal: 1982–83, 1984–85, 1985–86, 1986–87
- Supertaça Cândido de Oliveira: 1985, 1989
- Taça de Honra (1)
- European Cup runner-up: 1987–88, 1989–90
- UEFA Cup runner-up: 1982–83

=== Manager ===
Interclube

- Girabola: 2010
