= 1986–87 Primeira Divisão =

53rd season of top-tier Portuguese football

Primeira Liga
- Season: 1986–87
- Champions: Benfica; 27th title
- European Cup: Benfica; Porto (defending champions)
- Cup Winners' Cup: Sporting CP (first round)
- UEFA Cup: Vitória de Guimarães (first round); Chaves (first round); Belenenses (first round)
- Matches: 240
- Goals: 583 (2.43 per match)
- Top goalscorer: Paulinho Cascavel (22 goals)

The 1986–87 Primeira Divisão was the 53rd season of top-tier football in Portugal.

== Overview ==
It was contested by 16 teams, and S.L. Benfica won the championship.

== League standings ==
Pos	Team	Pld	W	D	L	GF	GA	GD	Pts	Qualification
1	Benfica (C)	30	20	9	1	51	23	+28	49	Qualification to European Cup first round
2	Porto (Note: Porto qualified for the 1987–88 European Cup as the 1986–87 European Cup defending champions.)	30	20	6	4	67	22	+45	46	Qualification to European Cup first round
3	Vitória de Guimarães	30	14	13	3	45	22	+23	41	Qualification to UEFA Cup first round
4	Sporting CP	30	15	8	7	52	28	+24	38	Qualification to Cup Winners' Cup first round
5	Chaves	30	13	7	10	39	38	+1	33	Qualification to UEFA Cup first round
6	Belenenses	30	13	4	13	52	40	+12	30	Qualification to UEFA Cup first round
7	Varzim	30	8	13	9	24	29	−5	29	
8	Boavista	30	9	9	12	34	36	−2	27	
9	Braga	30	10	6	14	32	34	−2	26	
10	Académica	30	7	12	11	22	34	−12	26	
11	Portimonense	30	8	10	12	27	47	−20	26	
12	Marítimo	30	9	7	14	34	49	−15	25	
13	Rio Ave	30	8	9	13	33	40	−7	25	
14	Salgueiros	30	6	12	12	22	40	−18	24	
15	Farense	30	7	7	16	33	47	−14	21	
16	O Elvas	30	3	8	19	16	54	−38	14	

Source: RSSSF
(C) Champions

== Results ==
Home \ Away	ACA	BEL	BEN	BOA	BRA	CHA	FAR	MAR	ELV	PTM	POR	RAV	SAL	SCP	VAR	VGU
Académica		3–1	0–0	2–0	0–0	2–0	1–0	1–1	1–1	1–0	1–3	2–0	0–0	0–2	0–0	1–1
Belenenses	3–0		1–1	1–2	4–2	0–1	3–1	0–3	5–1	5–0	0–3	3–1	0–0	2–0	4–1	1–1
Benfica	2–0	2–0		3–1	2–1	0–0	1–0	3–1	2–0	1–1	3–1	3–1	1–0	2–1	2–0	1–0
Boavista	0–0	3–1	0–2		1–0	1–3	0–0	5–1	1–0	2–3	1–1	1–0	4–0	1–1	0–0	1–1
Braga	0–0	0–1	– (Note: The match between Braga and Benfica was abandoned when the score was 1–1 and scored 0–3 loss for both teams.)	0–0		2–1	3–0	3–0	3–1	3–0	0–1	2–1	2–1	0–2	2–1	0–1
Chaves	1–1	1–0	1–2	1–0	0–2		3–2	3–1	3–1	0–0	1–2	3–2	4–0	2–1	1–0	1–1
Farense	1–2	0–0	0–2	1–1	1–0	4–0		2–0	1–1	4–0	1–0	2–2	0–0	2–1	1–2	1–4
Marítimo	3–1	3–2	2–2	2–2	1–1	0–2	1–0		5–1	0–0	1–4	2–0	2–1	1–0	1–1	0–2
O Elvas	1–1	0–2	0–2	1–0	0–2	1–2	1–2	2–0		1–1	0–2	1–0	0–0	0–3	0–0	0–0
Portimonense	2–0	1–5	0–3	1–2	2–0	0–0	3–2	1–0	3–0		1–0	2–3	1–2	1–1	1–0	1–1
Porto	1–0	1–0	2–2	2–1	3–1	3–0	8–3	1–0	6–0	5–0		3–0	4–0	2–0	0–0	2–2
Rio Ave	4–0	1–0	0–2	3–2	1–0	2–1	2–0	0–0	1–1	1–1	0–0		3–1	2–2	1–1	1–2
Salgueiros	2–1	0–2	1–1	2–0	1–1	2–2	2–0	0–2	3–1	0–0	0–3	1–1		0–0	2–1	0–0
Sporting CP	1–1	4–2	7–1	2–1	2–1	3–1	1–0	6–1	1–0	2–0	2–0	0–0	1–0		3–0	1–1
Varzim	2–0	2–1	0–0	0–1	1–0	0–0	3–2	2–0	1–0	1–1	0–2	1–0	1–1	1–1		1–1
Vitória de Guimarães	2–0	2–3	1–2	2–0	4–0	3–1	0–0	1–0	1–0	2–0	2–2	1–0	2–0	3–1	1–1	

Legend: Blue = home team win; Yellow = draw; Red = away team win.

== Season statistics ==
=== Top goalscorers ===
Rank	Player	Club	Goals
1	(Brazil) Paulinho Cascavel	Vitória de Guimarães	22
2	(Portugal) Fernando Gomes	Porto	21
3	(Portugal) Manuel Fernandes	Sporting	17
4	(England) Raphael Meade	Sporting	15
4	(Brazil) Jorge Andrade	Farense	15
6	(Zaire) Richard Mapuata	Belenenses	14
7	(Bulgaria) Stoycho Mladenov	Belenenses	13
7	(Portugal) Rui Águas	Benfica	13
9	(Bulgaria) Radoslav Zdravkov	Chaves	11
9	(Portugal) Chico Faria	Rio Ave	11

== Attendances ==
#	Football club	Home games	Average attendance
1	SL Benfica	15	55,333
2	FC Porto	15	45,000
3	Sporting CP	15	34,333
4	Vitória SC	15	20,667
5	SC Braga	15	16,800
6	Os Belenenses	15	16,600
7	Varzim SC	15	14,367
8	Boavista FC	15	13,200
9	CS Marítimo	15	12,633
10	Académica de Coimbra	15	12,200
11	SC Farense	15	12,167
12	Rio Ave FC	15	11,867
13	GD Chaves	15	11,433
14	O Elvas	15	9,600
15	Portimonense	15	9,000
16	Salgueiros	15	8,600
