= Supertaça Cândido de Oliveira =

Annual Portuguese football match

- Founded: 1979
- Region: Portugal
- Teams: 2
- Current champions: Porto (25th title)
- Most championships: Porto (25 titles)
- Broadcaster: RTP
- Website: www.fpf.pt
- 2026 Supertaça Cândido de Oliveira

The Supertaça Cândido de Oliveira (Portuguese pronunciation: [ˈsupɛɾ ˈtasɐ ˈkɐ̃diðu ðɨ ɔliˈvɐjɾɐ]; English: Cândido de Oliveira Super Cup, or simply Portuguese Super Cup) is an annual Portuguese football match played since 1979 between the winners of the top-tier league (Primeira Liga) and cup (Taça de Portugal) competitions.^{a} The match and trophy are named after former Portuguese player, coach and sports journalist Cândido de Oliveira. Recognised and organised by the Portuguese Football Federation since 1981, the Supertaça is usually played in August, before the start of the league season.

== History ==
In the 1943–44 season, the Super Cup was created for a special game between Primeira Divisão champions Sporting CP and Taça de Portugal winners Benfica, on occasion of the inauguration of the Estádio Nacional. The commissioned trophy was named Taça Império – not to be mistaken with Taça do Império, the first incarnation of the Taça de Portugal. After the game, it was decided that the competition was to be continued, but it was later canceled. The second incarnation came 20 years later when Casa da Imprensa (The Press House) instituted a trophy, the Taça de Ouro da Imprensa to be challenged between the national champions and the cup winners.

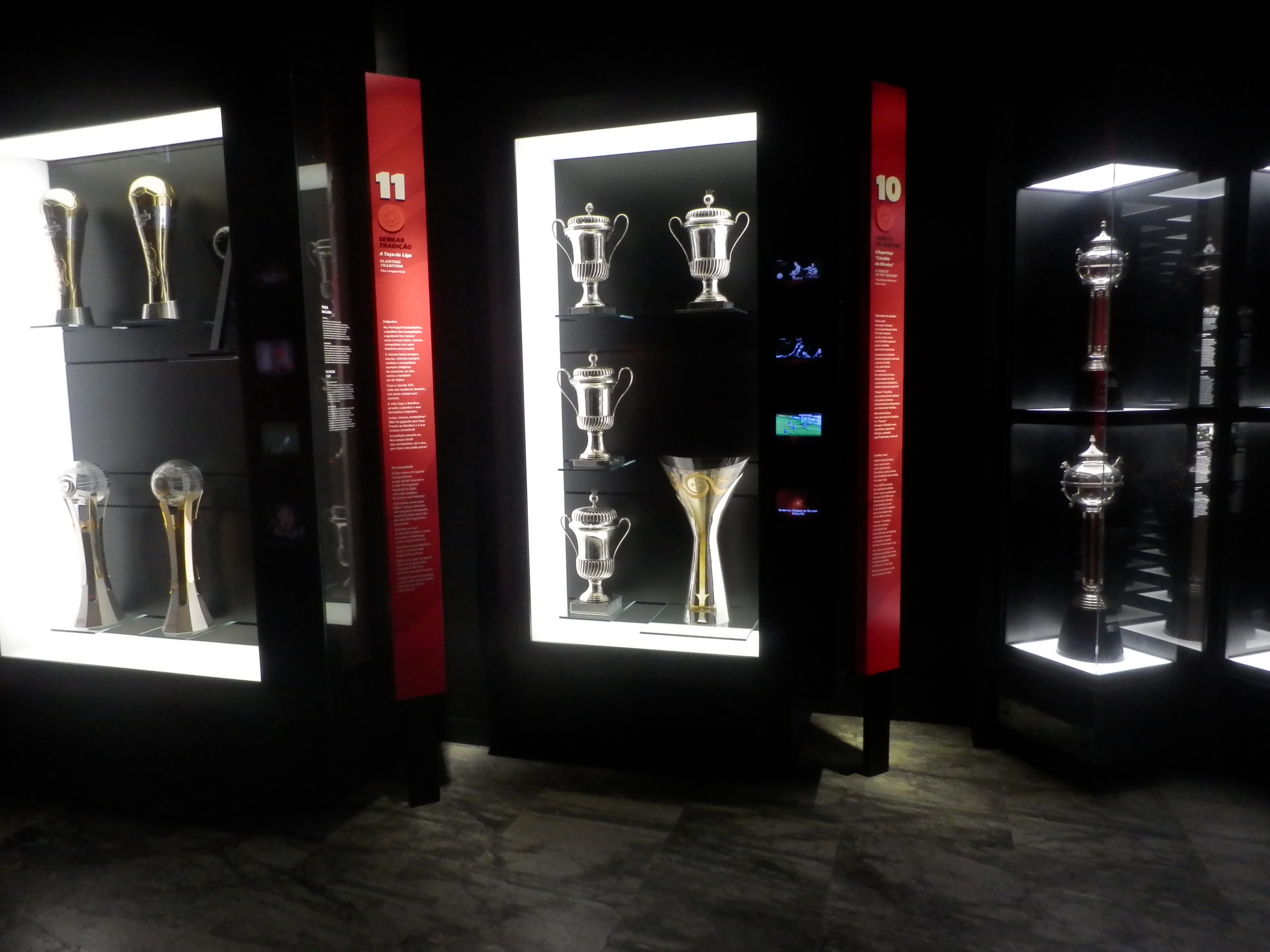
Previous trophy and new trophy since 2013

The Super Cup started unofficially in 1978–79 with a local derby between Boavista (Taça de Portugal holders) and Porto (League champions) that ended with a 2–1 victory for Boavista. The following season, another derby occurred between Benfica and Sporting, which constituted the second unofficial Super Cup and the first played over two legs (home and away). With the success of both unofficial Super Cup editions, the Portuguese Football Federation (FPF) decided to uphold the competition on a yearly basis in a two-legged format. The first official edition took place in the 1981–82 season, already under the current name.

The rules stated that two matches were played and that the aggregate result would determine the winner. If a draw occurred, then a replay of the match should be played in a neutral ground. This occurred six times — 1984, 1991, 1993, 1994, 1995 and 2000 — with the replay of the 1984 edition being contested again in two legs.

Because interest in the Super Cup was waning and in order to reduce the crowded football calendar, in the 2000–01 season, the FPF decided to abolish the two-legged format and replay match and use a single match played in a neutral ground to determine the winner.

== Editions ==
Predecessors
Taça Império
Year	Winner	Score	Runner-up	Date	Venue
1944	Sporting CP	3–2 aet	Benfica	10 June 1944	Estádio Nacional, Oeiras
1944	Single match played				
Taça de Ouro da Imprensa
Year	Winner	Score	Runner-up	Date	Venue
1964	Benfica	5–0	Sporting CP	29 March 1964	Estádio do Restelo, Lisbon
1964	Single match played				

Finals
Edition	Year	Home team	Score	Away team	Date	Venue
Unofficial competition
One-legged edition
1st	1979	Porto	1–2	Boavista	17 August 1979	Estádio das Antas, Porto
1st	1979	Single match played				
Two-legged editions (Home & Away)
2nd	1980	Sporting CP	2–2	Benfica	10 September 1980	Estádio José Alvalade, Lisbon
2nd	1980	Benfica	2–1	Sporting CP	29 October 1980	Estádio da Luz, Lisbon
2nd	1980	Benfica won 4–3 on aggregate				
Official competition
3rd	1981	Benfica	2–0	Porto ‡	1 December 1981	Estádio da Luz, Lisbon
3rd	1981	Porto ‡	4–1	Benfica	8 December 1981	Estádio das Antas, Porto
3rd	1981	Porto won 4–3 on aggregate				
4th	1982	Braga ‡	2–1	Sporting CP	9 October 1982	Estádio 1º de Maio, Braga
4th	1982	Sporting CP	6–1	Braga ‡	1 December 1982	Estádio José Alvalade, Lisbon
4th	1982	Sporting CP won 7–3 on aggregate				
5th	1983	Porto ‡	0–0	Benfica	8 December 1983	Estádio das Antas, Porto
5th	1983	Benfica	1–2	Porto ‡	14 December 1983	Estádio da Luz, Lisbon
5th	1983	Porto (2) won 2–1 on aggregate				
6th	1984	Benfica	1–0	Porto	27 March 1985	Estádio da Luz, Lisbon
6th	1984	Porto	1–0	Benfica	17 April 1985	Estádio das Antas, Porto
6th	1984	Aggregate: 1–1				
6th	1984	Porto	3–0	Benfica	16 May 1985	Estádio das Antas, Porto
6th	1984	Benfica	0–1	Porto	30 May 1985	Estádio da Luz, Lisbon
6th	1984	Final replay: Porto (3) won 4–0 on aggregate				
7th	1985	Benfica	1–0	Porto	20 November 1985	Estádio da Luz, Lisbon
7th	1985	Porto	0–0	Benfica	4 December 1985	Estádio das Antas, Porto
7th	1985	Benfica (2) won 1–0 on aggregate				
8th	1986	Porto	1–1	Benfica	19 November 1986	Estádio das Antas, Porto
8th	1986	Benfica	2–4	Porto	26 November 1986	Estádio da Luz, Lisbon
8th	1986	Porto (4) won 5–3 on aggregate				
9th	1987	Benfica	0–3	Sporting CP ‡	6 December 1987	Estádio da Luz, Lisbon
9th	1987	Sporting CP ‡	1–0	Benfica	20 December 1987	Estádio José Alvalade, Lisbon
9th	1987	Sporting CP (2) won 4–0 on aggregate				
10th	1988	Vitória de Guimarães ‡	2–0	Porto	28 September 1988	Estádio Municipal de Guimarães, Guimarães
10th	1988	Porto	0–0	Vitória de Guimarães ‡	19 October 1988	Estádio das Antas, Porto
10th	1988	Vitória de Guimarães won 2–0 on aggregate				
11th	1989	Benfica	2–0	Belenenses	25 October 1989	Estádio da Luz, Lisbon
11th	1989	Belenenses	0–2	Benfica	29 November 1989	Estádio do Restelo, Lisbon
11th	1989	Benfica (3) won 4–0 on aggregate				
12th	1990	Estrela da Amadora	2–1	Porto	7 August 1990	Estádio José Gomes, Amadora
12th	1990	Porto	3–0	Estrela da Amadora	14 August 1990	Estádio das Antas, Porto
12th	1990	Porto (5) won 4–2 on aggregate				
13th	1991	Benfica	2–1	Porto	18 December 1991	Estádio da Luz, Lisbon
13th	1991	Porto	1–0	Benfica	29 January 1992	Estádio das Antas, Porto
13th	1991	Aggregate: 2–2				
13th	1991	Porto (6)	1–1 aet (4–3 p)	Benfica	9 September 1992	Estádio Municipal de Coimbra, Coimbra
13th	1991	Final replay (Finalíssima)				
14th	1992	Porto	1–2	Boavista	16 December 1992	Estádio das Antas, Porto
14th	1992	Boavista	2–2	Porto	6 January 1993	Estádio do Bessa, Porto
14th	1992	Boavista (2) won 4–3 on aggregate				
15th	1993	Benfica	1–0	Porto	11 August 1993	Estádio da Luz, Lisbon
15th	1993	Porto	1–0	Benfica	15 August 1993	Estádio das Antas, Porto
15th	1993	Aggregate: 1–1				
15th	1993	Porto (7)	2–2 aet (4–3 p)	Benfica	17 August 1994	Estádio Municipal de Coimbra, Coimbra
15th	1993	Final replay (Finalíssima)				
16th	1994	Benfica	1–1	Porto	24 August 1994	Estádio da Luz, Lisbon
16th	1994	Porto	0–0	Benfica	21 September 1994	Estádio das Antas, Porto
16th	1994	Aggregate: 1–1				
16th	1994	Porto (8)	1–0	Benfica	20 June 1995	Parc des Princes, Paris
16th	1994	Final replay (Finalíssima)				
17th	1995	Sporting CP	0–0	Porto	6 August 1995	Estádio José Alvalade, Lisbon
17th	1995	Porto	2–2	Sporting CP	23 August 1995	Estádio das Antas, Porto
17th	1995	Aggregate: 2–2				
17th	1995	Sporting CP (3)	3–0	Porto	30 April 1996	Parc des Princes, Paris
17th	1995	Final replay (Finalíssima)				
18th	1996	Porto	1–0	Benfica	18 August 1996	Estádio das Antas, Porto
18th	1996	Benfica	0–5	Porto	18 September 1996	Estádio da Luz, Lisbon
18th	1996	Porto (9) won 6–0 on aggregate				
19th	1997	Boavista	2–0	Porto	15 August 1997	Estádio do Bessa, Porto
19th	1997	Porto	1–0	Boavista	10 September 1997	Estádio das Antas, Porto
19th	1997	Boavista (3) won 2–1 on aggregate				
20th	1998	Porto	1–0	Braga ‡	8 August 1998	Estádio das Antas, Porto
20th	1998	Braga ‡	1–1	Porto	8 September 1998	Estádio 1º de Maio, Braga
20th	1998	Porto (10) won 2–1 on aggregate				
21st	1999	Beira-Mar	1–2	Porto	7 August 1999	Estádio Mário Duarte, Aveiro
21st	1999	Porto	3–1	Beira-Mar	15 August 1999	Estádio das Antas, Porto
21st	1999	Porto (11) won 5–2 on aggregate				
22nd	2000	Porto	1–1	Sporting CP	13 August 2000	Estádio das Antas, Porto
22nd	2000	Sporting CP	0–0	Porto	31 January 2001	Estádio José Alvalade, Lisbon
22nd	2000	Aggregate: 1–1				
22nd	2000	Sporting CP (4)	1–0	Porto	16 May 2001	Estádio Municipal de Coimbra, Coimbra
22nd	2000	Final replay (Finalíssima)				
Single-match editions
Edition	Year	Winner	Score	Runners-up	Date	Venue
23rd	2001	Porto (12)	1–0	Boavista	4 August 2001	Estádio do Rio Ave FC, Vila do Conde
24th	2002	Sporting CP (5)	5–1	Leixões ‡	18 August 2002	Estádio do Bonfim, Setúbal
25th	2003	Porto (13)	1–0	União de Leiria ‡	10 August 2003	Estádio D. Afonso Henriques, Guimarães
26th	2004	Porto (14)	1–0	Benfica	20 August 2004	Estádio Cidade de Coimbra, Coimbra
27th	2005	Benfica (4)	1–0	Vitória de Setúbal	13 August 2005	Estádio Algarve, Faro/Loulé
28th	2006	Porto (15)	3–0	Vitória de Setúbal ‡	19 August 2006	Estádio Dr. Magalhães Pessoa, Leiria
29th	2007	Sporting CP (6)	1–0	Porto	11 August 2007	Estádio Dr. Magalhães Pessoa, Leiria
30th	2008	Sporting CP (7)	2–0	Porto	16 August 2008	Estádio Algarve, Faro/Loulé
31st	2009	Porto (16)	2–0	Paços de Ferreira ‡	9 August 2009	Estádio Municipal de Aveiro, Aveiro
32nd	2010	Porto (17)	2–0	Benfica	7 August 2010	Estádio Municipal de Aveiro, Aveiro
33rd	2011	Porto (18)	2–1	Vitória de Guimarães ‡	7 August 2011	Estádio Municipal de Aveiro, Aveiro
34th	2012	Porto (19)	1–0	Académica de Coimbra	11 August 2012	Estádio Municipal de Aveiro, Aveiro
35th	2013	Porto (20)	3–0	Vitória de Guimarães	10 August 2013	Estádio Municipal de Aveiro, Aveiro
36th	2014	Benfica (5)	0–0 aet (3–2 p)	Rio Ave ‡	10 August 2014	Estádio Municipal de Aveiro, Aveiro
37th	2015	Sporting CP (8)	1–0	Benfica	9 August 2015	Estádio Algarve, Faro/Loulé
38th	2016	Benfica (6)	3–0	Braga	7 August 2016	Estádio Municipal de Aveiro, Aveiro
39th	2017	Benfica (7)	3–1	Vitória de Guimarães ‡	5 August 2017	Estádio Municipal de Aveiro, Aveiro
40th	2018	Porto (21)	3–1	Desportivo das Aves	4 August 2018	Estádio Municipal de Aveiro, Aveiro
41st	2019	Benfica (8)	5–0	Sporting CP	4 August 2019	Estádio Algarve, Faro/Loulé
42nd	2020	Porto (22)	2–0	Benfica ‡	23 December 2020	Estádio Municipal de Aveiro, Aveiro
43rd	2021	Sporting CP (9)	2–1	Braga	31 July 2021	Estádio Municipal de Aveiro, Aveiro
44th	2022	Porto (23)	3–0	Tondela ‡	30 July 2022	Estádio Municipal de Aveiro, Aveiro
45th	2023	Benfica (9)	2–0	Porto	9 August 2023	Estádio Municipal de Aveiro, Aveiro
46th	2024	Porto (24)	4–3 aet	Sporting CP	3 August 2024	Estádio Municipal de Aveiro, Aveiro
47th	2025	Benfica ‡ (10)	1–0	Sporting CP	31 July 2025	Estádio Algarve, Faro/Loulé
48th	2026	Porto (25)	1–0	Torreense	1 August 2026	Estádio Cidade de Coimbra, Coimbra

Champions
Cup representatives
‡ Cup runners-up

== Performances ==
=== Performance by club ===
Note: These statistics do not include the predecessor competitions of 1944 and 1964.

Club	Winners	Runners-up	Winning years	Runner-up years
Porto	25	10	1981, 1983, 1984, 1986, 1990, 1991, 1993, 1994, 1996, 1998, 1999, 2001, 2003, 2004, 2006, 2009, 2010, 2011, 2012, 2013, 2018, 2020, 2022, 2024, 2026	1979, 1985, 1988, 1992, 1995, 1997, 2000, 2007, 2008, 2023
Benfica	10	13	1980, 1985, 1989, 2005, 2014, 2016, 2017, 2019, 2023, 2025	1981, 1983, 1984, 1986, 1987, 1991, 1993, 1994, 1996, 2004, 2010, 2015, 2020
Sporting CP	9	4	1982, 1987, 1995, 2000, 2002, 2007, 2008, 2015, 2021	1980, 2019, 2024, 2025
Boavista	3	1	1979, 1992, 1997	2001
Vitória de Guimarães	1	3	1988	2011, 2013, 2017
Braga	–	4	–	1982, 1998, 2016, 2021
Vitória de Setúbal	–	2	–	2005, 2006
Belenenses	–	1	–	1989
Estrela da Amadora	–	1	–	1990
Beira-Mar	–	1	–	1999
Leixões	–	1	–	2002
União de Leiria	–	1	–	2003
Paços de Ferreira	–	1	–	2009
Académica de Coimbra	–	1	–	2012
Rio Ave	–	1	–	2014
Aves	–	1	–	2018
Tondela	–	1	–	2022
Torreense	–	1	–	2026

Titles won by club (%)
1. FC Porto – 25 (52.0%)
2. SL Benfica - 10 (20.8%)
3. Sporting CP – 9 (18.7%)
4. Boavista FC - 3 (6.20%)
5. Vitória de Guimarães - 1 (2.00%)

=== Performance by qualification ===
Competition	Winners	Runners-up
Primeira Liga champions	28	20
Taça de Portugal winners	15	17
Taça de Portugal runners-up	5	11
TOTAL	48	48

== Notes ==
- ^a In case a team wins both the league and cup competitions (thus achieving the double), it plays the match again against the cup runners-up.

== See also ==
- List of association football competitions in Portugal
- List of Supertaça Cândido de Oliveira winning managers
