= History of the Portugal national football team =

Portugal
- Nickname(s): Seleção das Quinas (Team of the Quincunxes); Lusos (Lusitanians); Os Navegadores (The Navigators)
- Association: Portuguese Football Federation (Federação Portuguesa de Futebol, FPF)
- Confederation: UEFA (Europe)
- Head coach: Jorge Jesus
- Captain: Bernardo Silva
- Most caps: Cristiano Ronaldo (234)
- Top scorer: Cristiano Ronaldo (146)
- Home stadium: Various
- FIFA code: POR
First colours	Second colours

FIFA ranking
- Current: 5 ▲2 (7 October 2026)
- Highest: 2 (May–June 2010, October 2012, April–June 2014, September 2017 – April 2018)
- Lowest: 25 (August 1998)

First international
- Spain 3–1 Portugal (Madrid, Spain; 18 December 1921)

Biggest win
- Portugal 9–0 Luxembourg (Algarve, Portugal; September 11, 2023)

Biggest defeat
- Portugal 0–10 England (Lisbon, Portugal; 25 May 1947)

World Cup
- Appearances: 9 (first in 1966)
- Best result: Third place (1966)

European Championship
- Appearances: 9 (first in 1984)
- Best result: Champions (2016)

Nations League Finals
- Appearances: 2 (first in 2019)
- Best result: Champions (2019, 2025)

Confederations Cup
- Appearances: 1 (first in 2017)
- Best result: Third place (2017)
Medal record
Men's football
FIFA World Cup
Bronze medal – third place	1966 England	Team
UEFA European Championship
Gold medal – first place	2016 France	Team
Silver medal – second place	2004 Portugal	Team
Bronze medal – third place	1984 France	Team
Bronze medal – third place	2000 Netherlands and Belgium	Team
Bronze medal – third place	2012 Poland and Ukraine	Team
UEFA Nations League
Gold medal – first place	2019 Portugal	Team
Gold medal – first place	2025 Germany	Team
FIFA Confederations Cup
Bronze medal – third place	2017 Russia	Team
- Website: fpf.pt

The history of the Portugal national football team dates back to its first match on 18 December 1921. The national team, also referred to as Seleção das Quinas (Team of the Quincunxes), represents the nation of Portugal in international football. It is fielded by the Portuguese Football Federation and competes as one of the founding members of UEFA.

The Portugal national football team played its first international match in 1921 and has taken part in the FIFA World Cup, where their best finish was third in 1966. After reaching the final of the UEFA Euro 2004 on home soil with their golden generation, and reaching the semi-finals of the 2006 FIFA World Cup, Portugal's first major trophy came in 2016 with that year's European Championship. Over the following years, Portugal won the UEFA Nations League on two occasions: in 2019, making it the second major tournament earned by the Portuguese in three finals, and a record second title in 2025.

== Early years ==
The Portuguese Football Federation was formed in 1914 under the Portuguese Football Union name (by 1926, it changed to its current name) and the aim of creating national tournaments (since it only existed regional championships) and promoting matches in which a Portuguese representative team would play against other teams from various parts of the world. However, due to the outbreak of World War I, that objective was not feasible for the next seven years.

Portugal played its first match on 18 December 1921, a 3–1 defeat. The following year, the inaugural edition of the Campeonato de Portugal (a knock-out tournament and precursor to the Taça de Portugal) was contested with the winner named "Portuguese Champion".

== 1928 Olympics ==
After years of playing friendly matches, Portugal was invited to enter the 1928 Summer Olympics Football Tournament, which was, at that time, contested by the best national "A" teams in the world and, therefore, considered to be the best international footballing tournament until the FIFA World Cup started two years later in 1930.

The Portuguese team was drawn in the preliminary round against Chile for a place in the first round. After falling 2–0 behind, Portugal scored four goals to win the match 4–2. After their win against Chile, they faced off Yugoslavia and won 2–1 due to a late goal in the 90th minute. Portugal was then eliminated in the quarter-finals against Egypt after losing 2–1. Egypt would go on to lose against Argentina 6–0 in the semi-final and Italy 11–3 for the bronze medal match, which embittered the players. Nevertheless, it was a bright start in international tournaments for the team.

== Early World Cup attempts ==
Portugal was not invited to the 1930 World Cup, which only featured a final stage and no qualification round. The team took part in the 1934 World Cup qualification process, but failed to eliminate Spain, aggregating two defeats in the two-legged round, with a 9–0 loss in Madrid and 2–1 loss in Lisbon for an aggregate score of 11–1.

In qualification for the 1938 World Cup, the Seleção played one match against Switzerland at a neutral ground, in Milan, losing 2–1 to end their qualification prospects. Due to the outbreak of World War II, there was no World Cup held until the 1950 competition. Subsequently, the national team played very few matches against other nations. A 10–0 away friendly defeat against England played two years after the war evidenced how the irregularity of matches played had taken its effects on the squad.

== 1950s and early 1960s ==
Upon the restart of international play, Portugal was to play a two-legged round against Spain, just like in the 1934 qualification. After a 5–1 defeat in Madrid, they managed to draw in the second match 2–2 (7–3 on aggregate).

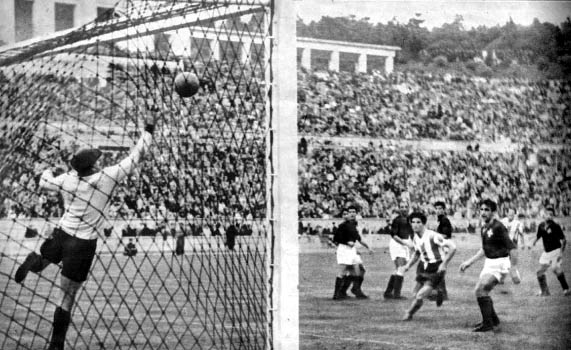
Portugal playing Argentina in Lisbon, November 1954

For the qualification of the 1954 World Cup, the team played Austria. The Austrians won the first match with a humiliating 9–1 result. The best the national team could do was hold the team to a goalless draw in Lisbon, and the round ended with a 9–1 defeat.

In the 1958 qualification, Portugal finished last in the group stage that also featured Northern Ireland and Italy; only the first-placed team would qualify. They started with a 1–1 draw against the Irish team, but lost in Belfast by a score of 3–0. After that, they won 3–0 against Italy and lost 3–0 in Milan. Finishing with three points, they were two points behind group winners Northern Ireland.

The year 1960 was the year that UEFA created the European Football Championship, a football tournament similar to the FIFA World Cup, but for European nations. The first edition was a knock-out tournament, the last four teams participating in final stage that only featured one leg while the older stages had two legs. For the first round, the Seleção das Quinas won 2–0 against East Germany and 3–2 in Porto for the second leg, finishing with a 5–2 two-legged win. The quarter-final opponent was Yugoslavia. Despite winning the first game 2–1, they lost the second leg 5–1 in Belgrade, and lost 6–3 on aggregate.

England and Luxembourg were the 1962 FIFA World Cup qualification adversaries of the national team. Portugal ended second in the group with three points, behind England (with seven points). They started well with a home win (6–0) against Luxembourg and a home draw (1–1) against the English, but lost the following games, first 4–2 against Luxembourg, then 2–0 against England. Like in the previous World Cup qualification, only the first in the group would qualify.

The 1964 European Championship shared the same format as the 1960 edition. Portugal played against Bulgaria in the first round. The Portuguese lost 3–1 in Sofia and won 3–1 in Lisbon. With the round tied 4–4, a replay was needed in a neutral ground. In Rome, Portugal lost 1–0 with a late goal from the Bulgarians.

In 1964, the Nations' Cup was held in Brazil. The event celebrated the 50th anniversary of the founding of the Brazilian Football Confederation. Three international teams were invited – Argentina, Portugal, and England – for the competition, which was played in Rio de Janeiro and São Paulo in late May and early June, with an all round-robin format. Portugal ended with one point (five behind winners Argentina) and joint third place with England after two defeats (4–1 with Brazil and 2–0 with Argentina) and a 1–1 tie against England

== 1966 World Cup and 1970s ==
In the 1966 World Cup qualification, Portugal was drawn into the same group as Czechoslovakia, Romania, and Turkey. They topped the group with only one draw and one defeat in all six games and finally qualified for a FIFA World Cup; that year the final stage would be held in England. Notable results were 1–0 away wins against Czechoslovakia and Turkey and a 5–1 home win against the Turks.

The team started out with three wins in the group stage, where they were in Group C, against Hungary 3–1, Bulgaria 3–0, and two-time defending champions Brazil 3–1. In the quarter-finals, Portugal played against North Korea. Portugal won the game with four goals from Eusébio overturning a deficit of 3–0. Later, they reached the semi-finals but were defeated by hosts and eventual champions England 2–1; in this game, Portugal would have played in Liverpool, but as England were the hosts, FIFA decided that the game should be in London, which led the Portuguese team to travel unexpectedly from Liverpool to London. Portugal then defeated the Soviet Union 2–1 in the third place match for their best World Cup finish to date. Eusébio was the top scorer of the World Cup, with nine goals.

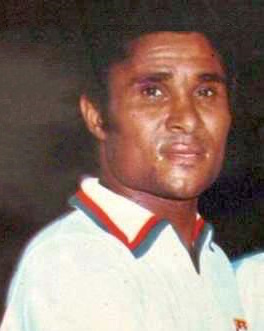
Eusébio in 1972

For the Euro 1968 qualifying, the Seleção played against Bulgaria, Norway, and Sweden. They finished second to Bulgaria, with six points, four behind the Bulgarians. Portugal only managed two wins and two draws; both wins came from 2–1 results against Norway.

After their tremendous success in the 1966 World Cup, Portugal tried to qualify for the 1970 World Cup, which was to be held in Mexico. They finished fourth and last in their group, behind Greece, Romania, and Switzerland. With only four points (from one win and two ties), Portugal were four points behind group winners Romania.

To be able to participate in Euro 1972, Portugal had to win its group that comprised the teams of Belgium, Denmark, and Scotland. Portugal finished second to Belgium with seven points (two less than the Belgians). The three wins the Portuguese had were against Denmark (1–0 away, 5–0 home) and Scotland in a 2–0 home win.

Also in 1972, Portugal participated in the Brazilian Independence Cup, a tournament that marked the 150th birthday since Brazil received its independence from Portugal. Winning both group stages (in the first stage, with wins against Ecuador (3–0), Iran (3–0), Chile (4–1) and the Republic of Ireland (2–1) and in the second stage winning against Argentina (3–1), drawing Uruguay (1–1) and a 2–1 win over the Soviet Union) they qualified for the final with Brazil at the Estádio do Maracanã. The Brazilian star Jairzinho scored in the 89th minute to give Brazil the win.

For the 1974 qualification stages, Portugal were placed in an accessible group, but were unable to defeat Bulgaria (2–2) in the decisive match, thus not qualifying. The only country Portugal managed to defeat was Cyprus, winning 4–0 and 1–0 in Nicosia. Portugal faced tough competition from the strong Poland team to claim the spot that would ensure them a place in the 1978 FIFA World Cup held in Argentina. They finished second place, behind Poland.

== Late 1970s, 1980s and early 1990s ==
The national team was put alongside Austria, Belgium, Norway, and Scotland to fight for the first spot in the group, which would allow them to go to the final stage of UEFA Euro 1980. With nine points, Portugal took third place, three points behind first-placed Belgium. Out of their four wins, the most important were the away win against second-placed Austria (2–1) and a home win against Scotland (1–0).

For the 1982 qualification the Portuguese team had to face Israel, Northern Ireland, Scotland and Sweden for the top two group places. Portugal finished in fourth place with seven points, less four than the first, with wins over group winners Scotland (2–1), second-placed Northern Ireland (1–0) and last-placed Israel (3–0), all in home ground.

During the campaign for Euro 1984, Portugal had to play with Finland, Poland and, highly favourites, Soviet Union. Portugal won the group with a dramatic win over USSR in the last game by a score of 1–0 in home ground. With ten points and five wins, the Portuguese had beaten the Soviet Union by one point.

Portugal ended in group B, alongside Spain, West Germany and Romania. In the first two games, they tied 0–0 and 1–1 against West Germany and Spain, respectively. A 1–0 win over Romania gave them second place in the group, which was enough to go through to the knockout stage. Benfica's Tamagnini Nené scored the winner.

They played against the hosts, France, and eventual champions, in one of the most exciting matches in European Championship history. France scored first, but Portugal equalised almost an hour later. The game was tied after 90 minutes and went into extra time. Portugal made the score 2–1 in the first 15 minutes, with both teams having numerous quality scoring chances. In the second half of extra time, France scored in the 114th and 119th minutes to eliminate Portugal 3–2 and go through to the final.

For the 1986 tournament, the Selecção played against Czechoslovakia, Malta, Sweden, and West Germany for the two spots that would guarantee them a ticket to Mexico. Needing a win in the last game against West Germany in Stuttgart, manager José Torres famously said to the press, after being severally doubted that his team would qualify for Mexico 1986, "Let me dream!" Portugal went on to win the game 1–0 to become the first team to beat West Germany at their home ground in an official match.

Portugal was a fan-favourite to make a good campaign because of their UEFA Euro 1984 tournament. The team exited early in the group stages after a win and two losses. They started with a 1–0 win to England. Later, they were beaten by Poland and Morocco, 1–0 and 3–1, respectively. Their staying in Mexico was marked by a doping case, an injured player and, most significantly, by the Saltillo affair, where players refused to train in order to win more prizes from the Football Federation.

Wanting to keep present at the major international football tournaments, the Portuguese team attempted to top their qualifying group in a tight group with favourites Italy, Malta, Sweden and Switzerland. Still, they only managed to win two games in a total of eight disputed, ending in third with eight points, five behind first-placed Italy. Both games were won away from home, in Malta (1–0) and in Sweden against second-placed team (also 1–0).

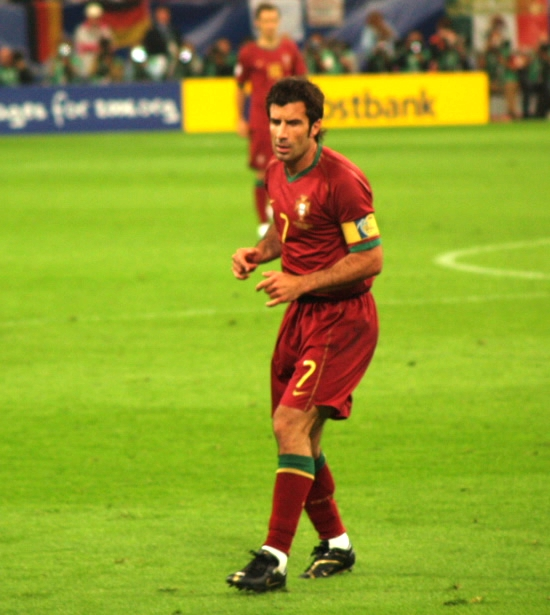
Luís Figo playing for Portugal at the 2006 FIFA World Cup

The 1990 World Cup qualification was widely seen as a possibility to go back to the international stage. Along with Belgium, Czechoslovakia, Luxembourg and Switzerland, Portugal fought until the last game to get one of the first two spots of the group. Playing at home against Czechoslovakia, they failed to score and the game ended in a 0-0 allowing the East Europeans to get the second place with twelve points (the same as winners Belgium) with two points ahead of Portugal, who came with the first place. Notable results are the wins against Switzerland, 3–1 in Portugal and 2–1 in Neuchâtel.

During the draws for the Euro 1992 qualifying, the Netherlands was seen as the strongest team besides Portugal. Greece, Finland and Malta were the other teams. With five wins and eleven points, the Portuguese ended second behind the Dutch, who had two more points than Portugal. A famous result in this campaign was the 1–0 home win against the Dutch.

They participated in the friendly 1992 U.S. Cup along with the host, USA, Italy and Ireland in a round robin tournament. Portugal finished last with one point (six behind winners United States) from a draw with Italy (0–0). The other two games were defeats with USA (1–0) and the Republic of Ireland (2–0).

For the ’94 World Cup qualification, Portugal played in the same group as Estonia, Italy, Malta, Scotland and Switzerland for the two highest places. They disappointed, ending in third with 14 points and six wins, just two points behind winners Italy and one behind second-placed Switzerland. In the last game of the round, Portugal were defeated by Italy in Milan. The Selecção managed to win 1–0 against Switzerland and 5–0 against the Scots, both were home wins. The then manager, Carlos Queiroz, blamed the Football Federation for this failure, saying, "They should clean the mess that the Federation has."

== The golden generation ==
Portugal was invited to play at the SkyDome Cup in Toronto, Canada against the then-European champions Denmark and Canada. With a draw against the Canadians (1–1) and a win against the Danes, Portugal went on to win the trophy, which was their first win at senior level.

Portugal managed to reach the Euro 1996, by topping their group with twenty-three points, six more than second-placed Republic of Ireland. Their group consisted of Austria, Latvia, Liechtenstein, Northern Ireland and Republic of Ireland.

In the final tournament, Portugal drew 1–1 with European Champions Denmark, won 1–0 to Turkey and 3–0 against Croatia, finishing first in their group. In the quarter-finals, they lost 1–0 to eventual runners-up Czech Republic, due to a marvelous Karel Poborský second-half lob over goalkeeper Vítor Baía. This marked the beginning of the Golden Generation, a group of youngsters who had won the FIFA U-20 World Cup in 1989 and 1991 and were now leading the national senior squad.

The team almost qualified for the tournament that was to be hosted by France. However, during a qualifier in Germany, Rui Costa was sent off by French referee Marc Batta for taking too long to walk off the field while Portugal was leading 1–0. Germany drew the crucial game and was thus able to qualify. This incident is regarded as one of the darkest in Portugal's football history, with FIFA being accused of favouritism in support of Germany, who were the defending Euro '96 champions. The group was made of Albania, Armenia, Germany, Northern Ireland and Ukraine, Portugal ended in third place with 19 points and six wins. Germany finished first with 22 points and Ukraine with twenty, with the Slavics winning a place in the final play-offs. Portugal tied both games with Germany (0–0 home and 1–1 away).

In the qualifications for the 2000 Euro, Portugal faced Azerbaijan, Hungary, Liechtenstein, Romania and Slovakia. Portugal gained twenty-three points, just one short of first place Romania, with seven wins. Having not qualified directly into the event, the Portuguese team had the best performance by any runner-up and therefore qualified for the final tournament.

Captained by Fernando Couto in the final stage, they defeated England (3–2, recovering from a 2–0 disadvantage), Romania (1–0) with a late header from Costinha in injury time, and Germany (3–0, from a Sérgio Conceição hat-trick), the last one using the B team, since they were already qualified in first of the group after the other two games, to finish atop their group and then defeated Turkey in the quarter-finals (2–0, with both goals from Nuno Gomes).

In the semi-final meeting with World Cup holders France, Portugal scored first and nearly scored again due to a João Pinto's header after France equalised. Portugal were eliminated in extra time by a golden goal when Zinedine Zidane converted a penalty. Austrian referee Gunter Benko awarded the spot kick for a handball after Abel Xavier blocked a shot from Sylvain Wiltord (Benko initially gave France a corner but changed his mind after consulting with Slovak linesman Igor Sramka). Xavier, Nuno Gomes (one of the top scorers in the tournament with four goals), and Paulo Bento were all given lengthy suspensions for shoving the referee. The final result was 2–1.

During the World Cup 2002 qualification, Portugal made a crucial win against the Netherlands (2–0 in Rotterdam) and ties against Republic of Ireland (1–1 in both games) and the Netherlands (2–2), in Porto, after falling 2–0 behind and scoring in the dying minutes of the game. Portugal won the group with seven wins and three ties with no defeats and 24 points (the same as the Republic of Ireland), but with a better goal average.

While the 2002 World Cup qualifying stage was unusually smooth, several problems and poor judgment decisions occurred during the preparation and tournament itself – shopping sprees by players, this time in Macau, were widely reported in the Portuguese press. Questionable managing choices and some amateurism, including the same lack of agreement on prizes. Vítor Baía replaced in-form Ricardo in goal, Beto played out of position at right back, Luís Figo was in very poor physical condition, and Hugo Viana was called as a last-minute replacement for Daniel Kenedy (who tested positive in a doping control test) – as Portugal underachieved and ended third in its group stage, subsequently eliminated. The manager Oliveira was fired after the World Cup.

Portugal entered the tournament as favourites to win Group D. However, they were upset 3–2 by the United States, at one point being three goals down in the match. They then rebounded with a 4–0 smashing Poland, with Pauleta netting a hat-trick.

Needing a draw to advance, they lost the final group game to hosts South Korea. Argentine referee Ángel Sánchez sent off João Vieira Pinto for a tackle on Park Ji-Sung. Beto was ejected for his second yellow card of the match, reducing Portugal to nine men, and Park scored the winner to allow the Koreans to advance.

The next major competition, the UEFA Euro 2004, was decided to be held in Portugal. On the preparation, the Football Federation made a contract with Luiz Felipe Scolari to manage the team until the tournament ended. Despite the disappointed friendly matches, the Portuguese team entered the tournament being a favourite to win it.

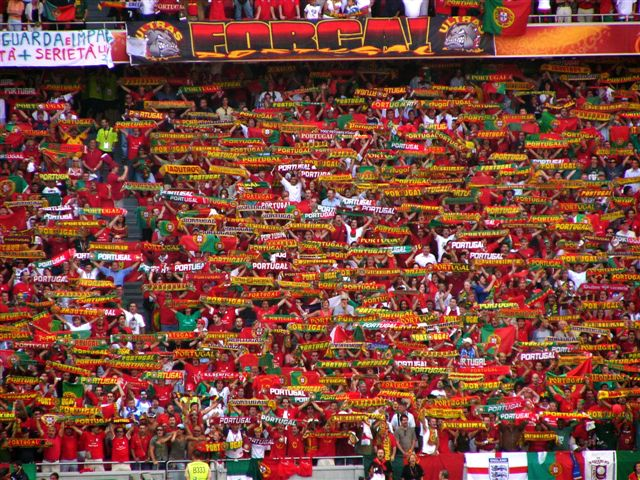
Portuguese fans supporting the national team

The host nation lost the first game against Greece 1–2, an upset. They got their first win against Russia 2–0 and also beat a strong Spain side 1–0, with the latter eventually knocked out in the group stages.

They went through and went on to play against England, in an entertaining 2–2 draw that went into penalties, where Ricardo proved decisive, with an epic attitude taking off his goalkeeping gloves, saving a penalty and scoring right after the winner himself. Portugal beat the Netherlands 2–1 in the semi-final with a Maniche strike from outside the box. They were eventually beaten by heavy underdog outsiders Greece 1–0, credited to striker Angelos Charisteas, marking the first time in the history of the competition that the final featured the same two teams as the opening match. The match was considered a dominant win for Greece.

After the tournament ended, a lot of players belonging to the Geração de Ouro (Golden Generation), abandoned their international footballing careers, with only Luís Figo remaining in the team, despite a temporary retirement. The only silver lining for Portugal was the emergence of Cristiano Ronaldo as a key player, who had just signed for Manchester United and had been a real revelation. Ronaldo scored two goals and was selected in the UEFA Euro All Stars Team. He would go on to become the captain of the national side after the retirement of Luis Figo. While Portugal was playing in the competition, Scolari agreed in a new two-year deal with the Federation.

Portugal finished first in the qualifying round for the 2006 World Cup with 30 points, nine games won, three draws, and no defeats. The second-placed Russia finished with seven points less. The Seleção played with Estonia, Latvia, Liechtenstein, Luxembourg, Russia, and Slovakia.

Portugal finished first place in Group D of the World Cup finals, with victories over Angola (1–0, goal from Pauleta, the leading goalscorer in the World Cup qualifiers), Iran (2–0, scored by Deco, and Cristiano Ronaldo) and Mexico (2–1, goals from Maniche and Simão). Only Mexico's Francisco Fonseca was able to score against Portugal.

The Netherlands lost to Portugal 1–0 in the Round of 16 on 25 June in Nuremberg. The only goal came courtesy of a Maniche strike in an acrimonious match marked by 16 yellow cards, with four players (Khalid Boulahrouz, Costinha, Deco, and Giovanni van Bronckhorst) being sent off. (See the Battle of Nuremberg.)

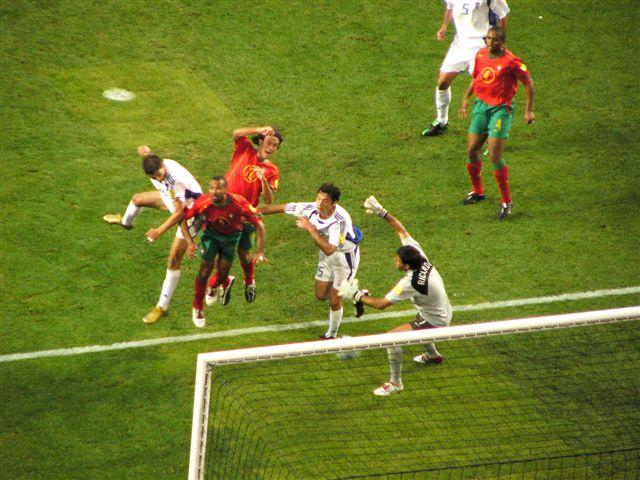
Portugal lost the UEFA Euro 2004 final 0–1.

On 1 July at Gelsenkirchen, Portugal drew 0–0 after extra-time with England, but won 3–1 on penalties to reach their first World Cup semi-final since 1966. Cristiano Ronaldo scored the winning penalty. The game was marred by a violent challenge on Portuguese defender Ricardo Carvalho by England's Wayne Rooney, which resulted in him being sent off. Cristiano Ronaldo was accused by England fans to have influenced the referee's decision to send Rooney off despite the two of them being teammates at Manchester United.

Portugal lost 1–0 against France in the semi-finals on 5 July at Munich. Two players had been forced to sit out due to accumulated bookings from the round of 16 and quarter-finals. It did not help that the team faced a hostile crowd of English and French fans; they relentlessly booed Ronaldo for his perceived unsportsmanlike behavior in the previous round. As in the semi-finals of Euro 2000, Portugal were narrowly defeated by France, with the decisive goal being a penalty scored by Zinedine Zidane after Thierry Henry was awarded a penalty from a foul committed by Ricardo Carvalho.

Portugal faced Germany in the third place play-off match on 8 July in Stuttgart. The match was notable for being Pauleta's last game for the national team so as captain Luís Figo's last before retirement from international football – though, surprisingly, he was not selected to start the game, coming on as a substitute near the end and setting up Portugal's goal in a 3–1 defeat. All three German goals had the direct participation of Bastian Schweinsteiger, who scored twice and had another shot turned into an own goal by Portugal's Petit. Ultimately, the team won the "Most Entertaining Team" award for their play during the World Cup, in an award always organized through public participation in a poll. Cristiano Ronaldo missed out on the U-23 Player of the Tournament award and it was believed that FIFA's decision was influenced due to hate mail from supporters of England who were still upset with Ronaldo's part in getting Rooney sent off in the quarter-final stage. Once again Scolari was asked to accept a new deal with the federation that would maintain with as the manager until the end of the next competition.

== Euro 2008 ==
After the successes of the Euro 2004 and the 2006 FIFA World Cup, Portugal was seen as a major contender to win the Euro 2008, but their qualification wasn't easy. The national team faced some problems in the last games, in addition, Scolari was suspended for three games, being substituted by his assistant manager. Portugal ended with seven wins and twenty-seven points (one less than first-placed Poland). Armenia. Azerbaijan, Belgium, Finland, Kazakhstan, Poland and Serbia were the opponents. With important triumphs against Azerbaijan (2–0 in Baku), Kazakhstan (2–1 in Almaty) and Belgium (4–0 in Lisbon and 2–1 in Brussels), they managed to qualify for the final stage.

The Portuguese team was a featured part of TV network ESPN's ad campaign promoting their coverage of the UEFA Euro 2008 tournament. The first game was against Turkey and it was won 2–0, with first-ever scoring achievements for internationals Pepe and Raul Meireles. Their second game was against the Czech Republic, a 3–1 success. With assured qualification to the knockout stage, as first in group A, they played with the reserve team against Switzerland, and lost 2–0, with two Hakan Yakın goals. During the group stage, Scolari announced to the squad that it would be his last spell as the Portuguese manager, ending a five-year era full of prosperity.

On 19 June 2008, Portugal played against Germany, and were beaten 2–3 after falling behind 0–2 within the first half an hour. Portugal proceeded to score, followed by another Germany goal, a Michael Ballack header. Portugal scored a consolation goal in the final minutes of normal time, courtesy of Hélder Postiga, but was eventually knocked out of Euro 2008 at the quarter-final stage.

== 2010 World Cup ==
Portugal participated in the qualifying stages with manager Carlos Queiroz for the 2010 FIFA World Cup, which took place in South Africa. The team had a qualifying campaign that almost turned disastrous and just sneaked into second place by a single point over Sweden, a group where Denmark finished first, one point ahead from Portugal. Portugal was drawn to play against Bosnia and Herzegovina in the European zone play-offs. With two wins (1–0 in the first leg, in Lisbon; and 1–0, in Zenica), the team gained its right to participate in the World Cup. Having qualified for the 2010 FIFA World Cup, the Seleção das Quinas had its most successful decade to date, having qualified for all of the World Cups and Euro Cups (Euro 2000, World Cup 2002, Euro 2004, World Cup 2006, Euro 2008, and World Cup 2010), along with Spain, Italy, Germany, and France, the only other four teams to have done so.

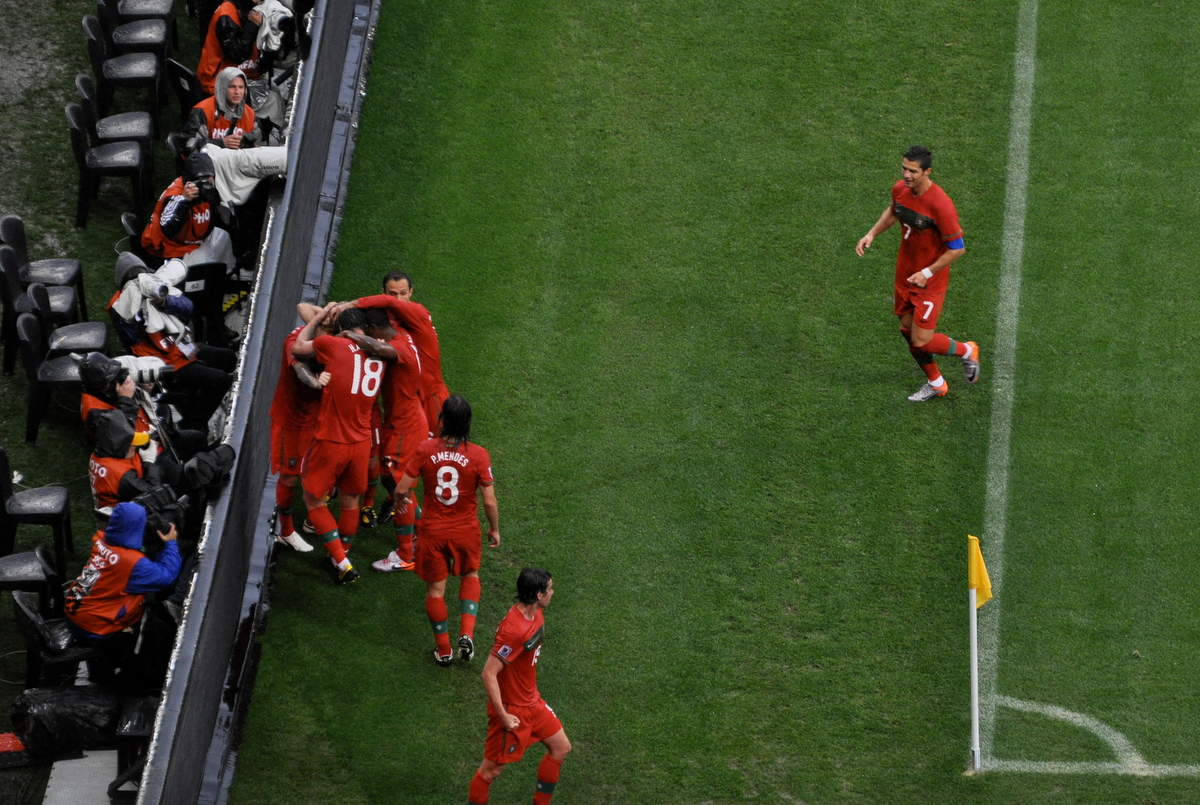
Portuguese players celebrating a goal against North Korea on 21 June 2010

In the final draw, on 4 December 2009, Portugal was drawn in one of the toughest groups, the so-called Group of Death where the Seleção das Quinas faced 5-time champions Brazil, Africa's top contenders Ivory Coast and 1966 opponents North Korea.

Portugal faced Ivory Coast in their opening match on 15 June 2010 at the Nelson Mandela Bay Stadium in Port Elizabeth and the game ended in a goalless draw. Their next match was against North Korea on 21 June 2010 at the Cape Town Stadium in Cape Town in which Portugal won by 7–0. Their last match in the group stage against Brazil on 25 June 2010 at the Moses Mabhida Stadium in Durban ended in a goalless 0–0 while both teams advanced to the knockout stage. Portugal was on a 19 match undefeated streak, conceding only 3 goals. The Portuguese defence ended being broken by Spain's David Villa's goal which defeated Portugal in the round of 16, 1–0.

During the Tournament, Queiroz was frequently criticised for setting up the team in an overly cautious way. The team's style of play was to keep the team well closed in the back, while sending direct balls up to the front, most notably to a lonely Cristiano Ronaldo, whose mission seemed to be to run at the opposition's defence and try long shots to take advantage of the tricky Jabulani. This approach was widely criticised, with an outburst coming from Deco, as well as implied from Cristiano Ronaldo's reply to a post-game comment after the defeat against Spain. When asked about the team's performances, he answered with a dry "You can go ask Queiroz".

The direct football style was perceived as not taking full advantage of the Portuguese midfield, filled with top-flight players such as Cristiano Ronaldo, Deco, Raul Meireles, Simão, where a creative possession-based football had been the basis of the team in the preceding years. Although the team reached their base objective of getting past the group phase, and lost out to the eventual world champions, there was a palpable feeling that the team could have gone further had the coach been more ambitious.

A few months after the World Cup, and just days before the beginning of the Euro 2012 Qualifiers, squad regulars Simão, Paulo Ferreira, and Miguel all retired from international duty, stating they wanted to focus entirely on their respective clubs. In January 2011, a few weeks before the friendly match against Argentina, midfielder Tiago also retired from international football at just 29 years of age, stating personal reasons.

== Euro 2012 ==
As Carlos Queiroz suffered from criticism regarding the World Cup, he was also banned from coaching the national team for one month after an investigation concluded that he tried to block a doping test to the team while preparing for the World Cup in Portugal, as well as directing insulting words to the testers. In consequence, he received a further six-month suspension. This meant that Queiroz was not able to select the players or lead the team for the first two Euro 2012 qualifiers against Cyprus and Norway. In the sequence of these events, Portugal drew 4–4 against Cyprus at home, followed by a 1–0 defeat at the hands of Norway, placing the team in a difficult position right from the start. That prompted several media outbursts from Queiroz against the heads of the Portuguese Football Federation, which then prompted his dismissal as the head of the team.

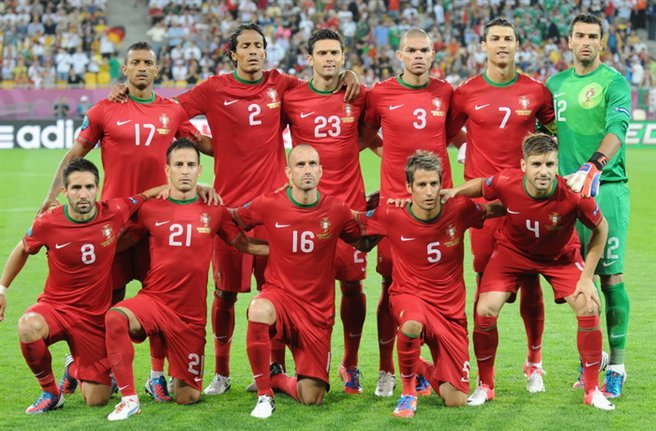
Portugal at the UEFA Euro 2012

In reaction to this dismissal, and in face of impending failure to qualify for UEFA Euro 2012, missing out to the first major final stage since the 1998 World Cup, the Federation's president, Gilberto Madaíl, traveled to Madrid in a bid to persuade superstar Real Madrid manager José Mourinho to lead his nation's team for the matches against Denmark and Iceland. This bid, however, was blocked by Real Madrid President Florentino Pérez.

On 21 September 2010, Paulo Bento, the former Sporting Clube de Portugal coach, was appointed as the Portuguese head coach. Paulo Bento's spell with the Seleção began with a 3–1 home win against Denmark, followed by a 3–1 away win against Iceland, pushing Portugal into the second spot of the group. On 17 November, Portugal and Spain faced each other in a friendly to commemorate the 100th year of the modern Portuguese Republic and also to promote the joint Portugal-Spain bid to host the 2018 FIFA World Cup. In a shocking upset, Portugal were 4–0 victors over the reigning World and European champions. In the match Ronaldo should score a wonderful opening goal, only rued out as offside with a little kick by Nani in front of the crossing line. Portugal ended up winning all except one of their remaining qualifying games only losing to Denmark. They finished second in their group and had to qualify in a two-game playoff with Bosnia and Herzegovina. They tied the first game 0–0 in Zenica and won 6–2 in Lisbon, securing a place in Euro 2012.

Portugal didn't start off the tournament well, as they were defeated 1–0 by Germany. Despite this they bounced back to win their next two games, with a 3–2 win over Denmark and a 2–1 win over the Netherlands. These two wins secured passage to the knockout stages. They faced the Czech Republic in the quarter finals, and won after a Cristiano Ronaldo goal in the 79th minute. They faced Spain in the semifinals, where the match went into penalties after a goalless 120 minutes. Spain defeated Portugal 4–2 on penalty kicks.

== 2014 World Cup ==
On 30 July 2011 at the 2014 FIFA World Cup preliminary draw, Portugal were placed in Group F along with Russia, Israel, Northern Ireland, Azerbaijan and Luxembourg. Portugal had a slightly shaky qualifying campaign, finishing second in the group after three draws and 1–0 loss to the eventual group winners Russia. The third qualifying game was a special one for Portugal's captain, Cristiano Ronaldo, as he became the youngest Portugal player ever to win 100 caps for the national team.

"It would be a lie to say that we are a top team. We have a very limited team and we are not at the best level. There are no miracles. We knew we would have a tough group, with perhaps teams better than us. I never thought we could win the tournament."

— Ronaldo after the 2014 World Cup.

Due to finishing second in their qualifying group Portugal advanced to play Sweden in a two-game playoff. They won the first game in Lisbon 1–0 after a Ronaldo goal, and then won the second game in Solna after a Ronaldo hat-trick. These wins secured Portugal's place in the 2014 FIFA World Cup.

Portugal were drawn into Group G with Germany, Ghana, and the United States. They played Germany first at the Arena Fonte Nova. Germany took the lead early on with a Thomas Müller penalty kick after a foul on Mario Götze. Toni Kroos then scored Germany's second. Pepe was involved in an altercation with Thomas Müller, where he headbutted Müller and was shown a straight red card. Germany went on to win the game 4–0 after two more goals by Thomas Müller. This was Portugal's worst ever loss at a World Cup.

In their next match with the United States, Portugal opened to scoring early, with Nani scoring in the fifth minute. However, the USA equalized after a goal from Jermaine Jones in the sixty fourth minute. The United States ended up taking the lead in the eighty first minute after a goal by Clint Dempsey. Cristiano Ronaldo crossed for Silvestre Varela who tied the game in the ninety fifth minute, keeping Portugal's qualification hopes alive.

In their last match in the group stage, in order to progress they needed to beat Ghana by at least 4 goals, and hope that the United States-Germany match did not end in a draw. Despite Portugal winning the game 2–1, and Germany defeating the USA 1–0, the Portuguese were eliminated on goal differential to the USA.

== Euro 2016 ==
Portugal was drawn in Group I for UEFA Euro 2016 qualifying with Albania, Armenia, Denmark, and Serbia. Portugal started off with a 1–0 loss to Albania, which resulted in Paulo Bento being dismissed, and veteran of all three of the major clubs in Primeira Liga, Fernando Santos, being brought in as his replacement. Under Santos, Portugal would win the rest of their games in the qualifiers, all by a single goal, and top their group.

During the final tournament Portugal were drawn in Group F with Iceland, Austria and Hungary. Three draws, including a thrilling 3–3 match with Hungary in the last group game, gave Portugal a third-place finish in their group; however, the new expanded format of the tournament meant Portugal qualified for the knockout stages as one of the best third ranked teams.

Portugal played Croatia in the round of 16. The match produced no shots on goal in ninety minutes. In the 116th minute Ivan Perišić hit the post for Croatia, and under a minute later Cristiano Ronaldo started a move passing to Renato Sanches, who ran it down the field. He passed it to Nani, whose scuffed shot landed at the feet of Ronaldo who had the first shot on goal in the game, which was saved, however the rebound was headed in by substitute Ricardo Quaresma. Portugal held on and moved on to face Poland in the quarter-finals.

The quarter-finals didn't start out well for Portugal, as Robert Lewandowski scored for Poland in the 2nd minute. Renato Sanches would equalize for Portugal in the 33rd minute. The game went to penalties, where Rui Patrício made a save on Jakub Błaszczykowski, and on the next spot kick, Ricardo Quaresma won the game for Portugal, and sent them to the semi-finals.

There, Portugal would face Wales. Cristiano Ronaldo gave Portugal the lead from a header in the 50th minute. This goal tied Ronaldo with Michel Platini for all-time leading scorer at the Euro finals, with nine goals. Just 3 minutes after this goal, Nani gave Portugal a 2–0 lead with an assist by Ronaldo. They held on to win, and Ronaldo was voted the Man of the Match, making it the sixth time in the tournament (including qualifiers).

Portugal's starting lineup for the Euro 2016 Final

In the final of Euro 2016, Portugal played the host nation and favorites to win, France. A Dimitri Payet challenge on Cristiano Ronaldo forced the Portuguese captain to be substituted despite his attempts to return. France came close to winning the game in the last minute of normal time, when André-Pierre Gignac struck the post. In extra time, Portugal's Raphaël Guerreiro hit the crossbar from a free kick. Eder, a substitute striker, eventually scored the winning goal in the 109th minute. With this win, Portugal claimed its first ever major international trophy in the country's history, led by Cristiano Ronaldo as the captain. Portugal's Renato Sanches was awarded the best young player and Cristiano Ronaldo won the Silver Boot for his 3 goals and 3 assists in the finals.

== 2017 Confederations Cup ==
Following their Euro 2016 victory, Portugal qualified to participate in the 2017 FIFA Confederations Cup. Portugal were drawn into Group A with Mexico, New Zealand and hosts Russia. In their opening match, Portugal faced Mexico. Ricardo Quaresma opened the scored in the 34th minute, following an assist from Cristiano Ronaldo. However, due to defensive errors Javier Hernández scored the equaliser in the 42nd minute. In the second half, Cédric Soares restored the advantage for Portugal, but minutes later Mexico would tie the game 2–2 after a header from Héctor Moreno, ending the match in a draw.

In the next match, Portugal faced hosts Russia. The Portuguese dominated the Russians from the beginning, and the goal came naturally in the 9th minute, scored by Cristiano Ronaldo. Afterwards, Raphaël Guerreiro injured himself during the game, being unable to play the rest of the competition, and the match ended with the Portuguese winning. In their last group stage match, Portugal faced New Zealand. Portugal took the advantage in the first half, with goals from Cristiano Ronaldo and Bernardo Silva. The result would be 4–0 in the second half after André Silva and Nani also put the ball in the back of the net. Thus, Portugal went to the semi-finals of the competition as the first place team of Group B, with a better goal difference than Mexico.

In the semi-finals, Portugal faced Copa América winners Chile semi-finals. The game was extremely close with dangerous situations for both sides and went into extra time after 90 minutes without a goal. The draw persisted for the entire amount of extra time. During this time, Gelson Martins replaced André Gomes, this being the first time a fourth substitution had been made in an official tournament match. Even before the extra time was over, Chile struck the post twice. The Chileans would eventually be victorious on penalties, with keeper Claudio Bravo saving all three Portuguese shots.

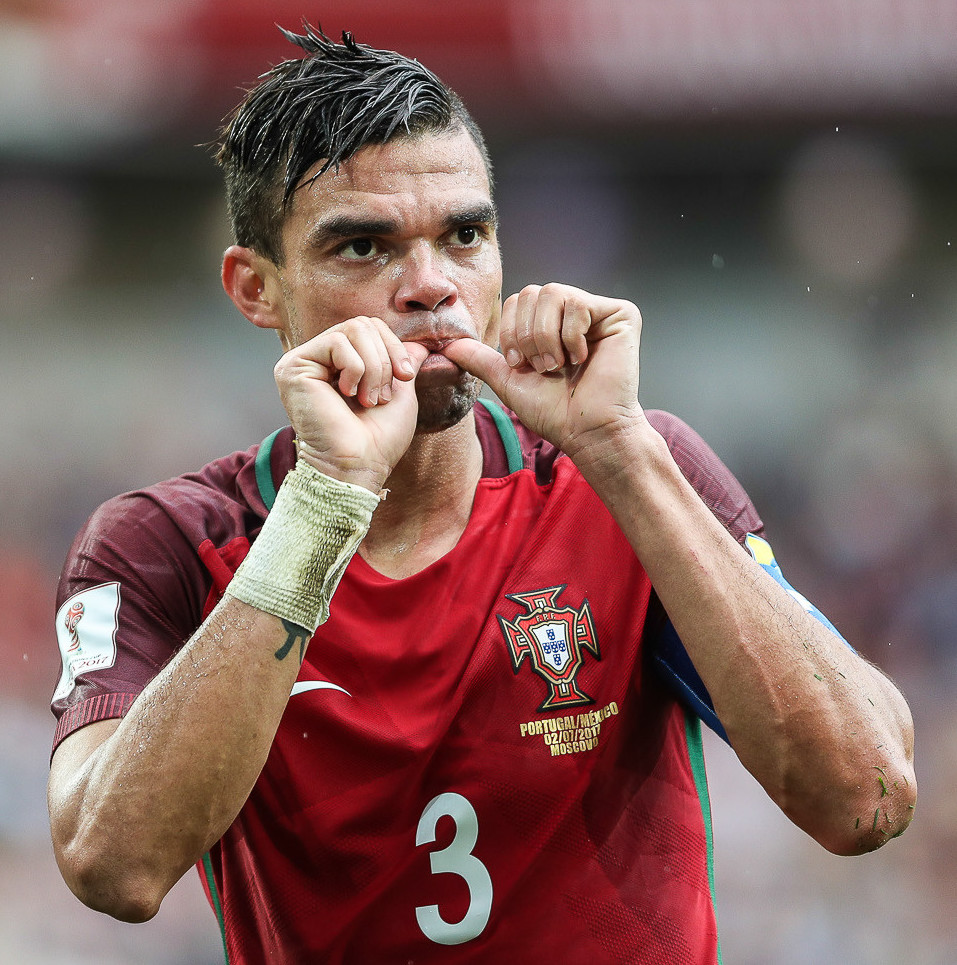
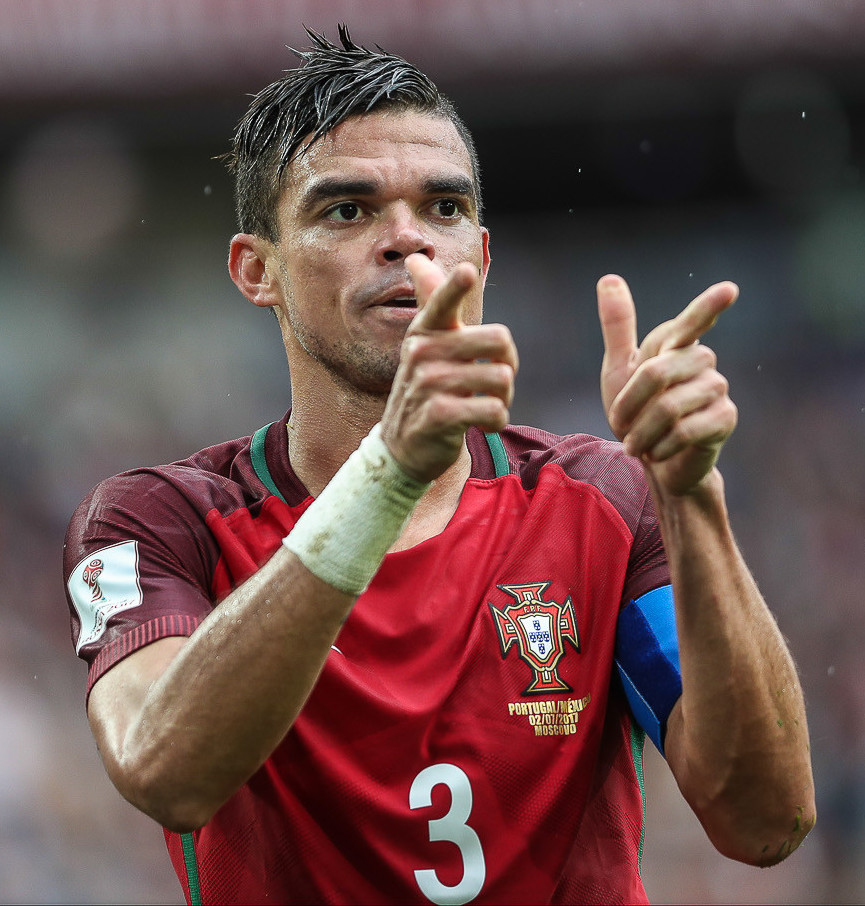
Pepe celebrates after scoring a late equalizer against Mexico at the 2017 FIFA Confederations Cup in Moscow.

In the third place game, Portugal faced Mexico in a rematch of the group stage game. André Silva had the opportunity to put Portugal ahead but missed a penalty in the 17th minute. It would be Mexico to open the scoring thanks to Luis Neto's own goal in the 55th minute. Pepe managed to restore equality at 91st minute, sending the game into extra time. During extra time, Adrien Silva took another penalty, this time successfully, but shortly afterwards Nélson Semedo left the team reduced to 10 after being sent off. Despite the numerical advantage on the field, Raúl Jiménez would eventually also see a red card for a foul on Eliseu. The result would be unchanged at 2–1 until the end. Thus, the Portuguese managed to reach the podium of the competition, finishing in third place.

== 2018 World Cup ==
In the 2018 FIFA World Cup preliminary draw, Portugal were placed in Group B along with Switzerland, Hungary, Faroe Islands, Andorra and Latvia. Portugal would only lose one match in qualifying: a 2–0 loss in their opener against Switzerland. However, Portugal would get redemption in their last group stage match, defeating Switzerland 2–0 to top their group on goal difference and qualify for the 2018 World Cup.

In the 2018 FIFA World Cup, Portugal were drawn into Group B with Spain, Morocco and Iran. In their opening match on 15 June, Portugal played against Spain. Cristiano Ronaldo scored with an early penalty, winning it after he was fouled by Nacho inside the box. Diego Costa then twisted and turned away from two Portugal defenders to score with a low shot to the left corner which brought the two sides level. But just before the break, David de Gea fumbled a Ronaldo shot from outside the penalty area through his gloves and over the line. Costa scored his second equaliser of the night just after the restart from close range before Nacho scored with a right foot half-volley in off the post from the edge of the penalty box, his first goal for Spain. As the clock ticked down, however, Gerard Piqué brought down Ronaldo just outside the box, with the Portugal star completing the scoring and his hat-trick with a free kick into the top right corner of the net. The match would finish 3–3.

In the second match, Portugal faced Morocco. Early in the match, João Moutinho swung in a cross from the right after a short corner and Cristiano Ronaldo headed the ball powerfully past goalkeeper Munir Mohamedi from six yards out and into the middle of the goal to open the scoring. Ronaldo played Gonçalo Guedes into the box but Munir made a one-handed save. Ronaldo shot over the crossbar when Bernardo Silva's mishit presented him with a shooting chance on the edge of the box early in the second half. Rui Patrício then made a save to preserve Portugal's lead when Hakim Ziyech's free kick was headed towards goal by Younès Belhanda, the goalkeeper diving to palm the ball away from danger. Ziyech shot another set-piece just over the crossbar from 25 yards. Nordin Amrabat and Medhi Benatia fired over with better chances. With their second loss in a row, Morocco became the first team eliminated from the 2018 FIFA World Cup.

Portugal's last group stage match was against Iran. In the 45th minute, Ricardo Quaresma cut in from the right before scoring with a curling shot off the outside of his right foot that looped over Alireza Beiranvand into the top-left corner. Saeid Ezatolahi's foul on Cristiano Ronaldo won Portugal a penalty, which Ronaldo shot low into the right, enabling Beiranvand to get down and make a stop. Iran then managed to get a penalty in stoppage time after the referee used VAR to determine that Cédric's handball from Sardar Azmoun's header had been intentional, which Karim Ansarifard converted high to his right. The game ended in a 1−1 draw, with Portugal advancing to the round of 16 as the runners-up of their group, after Spain drew 2−2 with Morocco.

Portugal faced Uruguay in the round of 16. In the seventh minute, Edinson Cavani switched play from right to left with a sweeping pass out to Luis Suárez, who delivered a cross which the former headed home at the back post from six yards out. In the 55th minute, Raphaël Guerreiro delivered a cross from a short corner on the left, which Pepe finished with a downward header. Just seven minutes later, Rodrigo Bentancur collected the ball around 30 yards out and slipped a pass out to Cavani on the left side of the penalty area, who then scored his second goal of the match with a curling right-foot strike into the right corner of the net to reclaim the lead for Uruguay. Bernardo Silva shot off-target with the goal gaping after Fernando Muslera's mistake, with Cavani seeming to pick up an injury in the scramble. The match finished 2–1 to Uruguay and Portugal were eliminated from the tournament.

== 2018–19 Nations League ==
Following the World Cup, Portugal took part in the inaugural UEFA Nations League, where the Seleção were placed in League A and drawn into Group 3 with Italy and Poland. On 9 March 2018, UEFA announced that Portugal had expressed interest in bidding for the Nations League finals, and it was later announced that the group winners would be appointed as the host of the tournament finals.

Before the first match with Italy, Portugal played a friendly with 2018 FIFA World Cup runners-up Croatia at the Estádio Algarve. The Portuguese pushed early, but it was the Balkan team that scored first after a close-range shot from Ivan Perišić. Pepe, who appeared in his 100th international game, scored the equalizer following a corner kick from Pizzi.

Portugal started the Nations League defeating Italy in a home 1–0 victory, with André Silva scoring the match's only goal, in a game where Portugal was always on top of an Italian team that rarely showed danger. This was Portugal's first victory in an official game against Italy since 1958.

In Portugal's second match, they faced Poland in Chorzów. The home side opened the scoring after 18 minutes following a corner kick which was scored by Krzysztof Piątek, but Portugal grew and managed to turn the match around just before the break with André Silva scoring for the away side, followed by an own goal from Kamil Glik, who put the ball on his own net after a pass from Rúben Neves to Rafa Silva. In the second half of the match, Bernardo Silva scored Portugal's third goal of the match. Poland did not give up, and Jakub Blaszczykowski managed to reduce to the home team with a shot from outside the box. Despite this, the Portuguese managed to maintain the advantage and secure a victory by the score of 3–2, consolidating the leadership of their group.

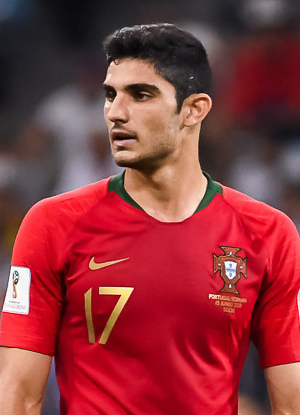
Gonçalo Guedes, who scored the winning goal against the Netherlands in the 2019 UEFA Nations League Final

In Portugal's third match, they once again faced Italy, this time in Milan. Forced to win, the Italians took on the expenses of the game, but Portugal knew how to hold the result, which remained 0–0 until the end, leading Portugal to win the group and ensure them as the host of the UEFA Nations League Finals, qualifying for the semi-finals of the tournament. Portugal's last match was against Poland at Estádio D. Afonso Henriques in Guimarães. André Silva scored the opening goal following a corner kick from Renato Sanches. In the second half, Arkadiusz Milik scored a penalty to equalize the match, after Danilo Pereira fouled him in the penalty area, leading Danilo to receive a red card and miss the next match.

In the semi-finals, on 5 June, Portugal faced Switzerland. Although the Swiss started the game with more scoring opportunities, it was Portugal who opened the scoring with a free-kick from Cristiano Ronaldo, who made his return to the team after the 2018 World Cup. In the 57th minute, Bernardo Silva was fouled in the penalty area and the match official immediately called a penalty for the Portuguese. However, the team responsible for the VAR drew attention to a move that occurred earlier, in which Nélson Semedo appeared to have touched Steven Zuber in the Portuguese area. After a bid review, referee Felix Brych gave a penalty to Switzerland, leading Ricardo Rodríguez to score the equalizer. The prospect of extra time would become more real until the 88th minute, when Rúben Neves pitched the ball to Bernardo Silva, who gave the ball to Cristiano Ronaldo to score Portugal's second goal. Two minutes later, Ronaldo scored his third goal of the game, completing a hat-trick and securing the hosts a spot in the final. With this game, Fernando Santos became the coach with the most victories in the history of the Portuguese team.

Four days later, in the final on 9 June at the Estádio do Dragão in Porto, Portugal faced the Netherlands. Portugal outperformed the Dutch early on, with multiple plays of danger. After much pressure, in the 60th minute, Gonçalo Guedes scored the only goal of the match with a shot from outside the box. The Dutch tried to score until the last minute, but the result remained unchanged until the end and Portugal won their second major international trophy in three finals. With this game, Rui Patrício became Portugal's most capped goalkeeper ever, surpassing Vítor Baía's record.

== Euro 2020 ==
Portugal was drawn in Group B for the UEFA Euro 2020 qualifying with Lithuania, Luxembourg, Ukraine, and Serbia. Portugal drew its first home matches against Ukraine and Serbia, 0–0 and 1–1 respectively, and suffered a 2–1 loss against Ukraine in the away fixture, but managed to win the rest of their matches, with a 2–0 away victory against Luxembourg sealing second place in the group, qualifying Portugal for the final tournament. In the process, Fernando Santos overtook Luiz Felipe Scolari's record as Portugal's coach with the most victories overall. Santos' team was drawn with France, Germany and Hungary in a widely speculated "group of death". Portugal advanced to the next round by defeating Hungary, drawing with France and losing to Germany. There, they faced Belgium and lost 0–1, finishing 13th overall, which is Portugal's lowest placement in Euros history.

== 2022 World Cup ==
Portugal was drawn into Group A of the 2022 FIFA World Cup qualifiers with Azerbaijan, Luxembourg, Republic of Ireland, and Serbia. After losing to Serbia at home on the final matchday, Portugal finished second and advanced to the playoffs as opposed to qualifying directly. On 24 March 2022, Portugal beat Turkey 3–1 in the playoff semi-final, and five days later they defeated North Macedonia 2–0 in the playoff final to secure a berth in the 2022 FIFA World Cup.

At the 2022 World Cup, Portugal defeated Ghana 3–2 in their first group game and then beat Uruguay 2–0 to qualify for the knockout stages. In the last group game, Portugal lost 2–1 to South Korea, but still managed to top their group. The match was marked by a controversy between national team captain Cristiano Ronaldo and national team coach Fernando Santos, with Ronaldo receiving criticism from his own coach for his reaction at being substituted. He was dropped from the starting line-up for Portugal's last 16 match against Switzerland, marking the first time since Euro 2008 that he had not started a game for Portugal in a major international tournament, and the first time Portugal had started a knockout game without Ronaldo in the starting line-up at an international tournament since Euro 2000. The Portuguese would eventually demolish Switzerland 6–1, their highest tally in a World Cup knockout game since the 1966 World Cup, with Ronaldo's replacement Gonçalo Ramos scoring a hat-trick. Tipped as favourites, Portugal employed the same strategy in the quarter-finals against Morocco but lost 1–0, making the Atlas Lions the first African semi-finalists at the World Cup. Following a disappointing World Cup campaign, which was marked by criticism over Santos defensive tactics and style of play, including the inability to utilise Portugal's attacking talent and the fracturing of his relationship Ronaldo, he was dismissed on 15 December.

== Euro 2024 ==
On 9 January 2023, Roberto Martinez was announced as the head coach of Portugal, replacing Fernando Santos. Portugal was drawn in Group I for UEFA Euro 2024 qualifying with Bosnia and Herzegovina, Iceland, Liechtenstein, Luxembourg and Slovakia. Martinez's first game in charge took place on 23 March in a 4–0 home win over Liechtenstein at Estádio José Alvalade in the UEFA Euro 2024 qualifiers. At the same stage, on 11 September, Portugal recorded their biggest victory in international history by defeating Luxembourg 9–0 at home. Portugal was one of the first European sides to advance from qualifying into the UEFA Euro 2024 after their 3–2 win over Slovakia, marking Portugal's fastest qualification to a major tournament in their history. The following match, on 16 October, Portugal secured first place of their group, following a 5–0 away victory over Bosnia and Herzegovina. Following a 2–0 home over Iceland, Martinez led Portugal to a perfect qualification campaign, overtaking the record for most scored and least scored against in a qualifying campaign in Portugal's history, with a record of 36 goals scored and only 2 goals conceded, keeping 9 clean sheets, in the process. Portugal also became one of the national teams in Europe to win all of their matches for the qualifiers of the UEFA European Championship, with 10 wins from 10 matches, the first time in Portugal's international history.

In their European Championship group, Portugal were paired with Georgia, Turkey and Czechia. With wins against Czechia and Turkey and a loss to Georgia, Portugal qualified for the Round of 16 as group winners, where they played against Slovenia. The game finished 0–0 and was decided on penalties, with Portuguese goalkeeper Diogo Costa saving each of Slovenia's penalties, while Portugal scored all of theirs. Facing France in the Quarter finals, the game again finished 0–0 and was decided on penalties; a miss by João Felix meant France won 5–3, and Portugal were eliminated.

== 2024–25 Nations League ==
Following the Euros, Portugal took part in the 2024–25 UEFA Nations League, where the Seleção were placed in League A and drawn into Group 1 with Croatia, Scotland and Poland. On 5 September, Portugal picked up their first win of the National League in a 2–1 victory over Croatia in the UEFA Nations League. Following a 5–1 home victory over Poland, Portugal topped their Nations League Group and qualified to the two-legged quarter-finals of the tournament. Despite losing to Denmark 1–0 away in the first leg, Portugal won the second leg at home on 23 March 2025, by a scoreline of 5–2, advancing to the semi-finals. At that phase on 4 June, Portugal won 2–1 away against Germany, marking his first-ever win against them in 24 years and securing qualification to the Nations League final. In the final against Spain, Portugal won 5–3 on penalties, winning a record second Nations League title.

== 2026 World Cup ==
In the 2026 FIFA World Cup preliminary draw, Portugal were placed in Group F along with Ireland, Hungary and Armenia. Portugal would only lose one match in qualifying: a 2–0 loss to Ireland in their penultimate match, with Ronaldo receiving the first straight red card of his international career for elbowing Dara O'Shea. Hence, he missed the final qualifying match against Armenia, which ended in a 9–1 win and secured qualification for the 2026 FIFA World Cup, with Portugal topping their group. However, FIFA's disciplinary committee handed him a suspended two-match ban, applicable within one year, allowing him to compete in the World Cup finals.

In the 2026 World Cup, Portugal were drawn into Group K with Colombia, DR Congo, and Uzbekistan. On June 17, they tied their opener against DR Congo 1–1 despite completing 724 passes, their most in a World Cup match. Despite defeating Uzbekistan 5–0 on June 23, Portugal underperformed during the group stage after drawing 0–0 with Colombia and finishing second in their group, where Portugal were heavly seen as favourites. After barely getting through against Croatia on July 2 in the round of 32, Portugal was eliminated in the round of 16 after a 1–0 defeat to Spain, with the decisive goal coming in stoppage time. Following the match, Martínez announced his resignation with immediate effect. The team was heavily criticized for their performance, including former Euro 2016 winner Ricardo Quaresma, who harshly criticized Portugal's exit, questioning the narrative of Portugal's the best generation in national history, their passive playing style, and expressed deep frustration with the team's overall lack of ambition.

== 2026–27 Nations League ==
Following the World Cup, on 10 July, Jorge Jesus was appointed as head coach of the Portugal national team. He was chose to become the new manager to inject a relentless, club-style urgency and intense tactical discipline into a squad that underperformed relative to its immense talent pool at the World Cup. Subsequently, Portugal took part in the 2026–27 UEFA Nations League, where the Seleção were placed in League A and drawn into Group A4 with Wales, Denmark and Norway. He made his debut in a match against Wales, in the group stage of the 2026–27 UEFA Nations League, winning 1–0 at Estádio José Alvalade in Portugal. With four consecutive wins in four matches, he secured qualification for the Nations League quarter-finals, becoming the first team to qualify and the only one to date to win all four of its opening matches in League A of the competition. During this time, he became involved in a public dispute with Cristiano Ronaldo after leaving him as an unused substitute during Portugal's 2–1 victory over Norway. Ronaldo accused Jesus of breaking promises regarding his playing time and subsequently left Portugal's training camp ahead of their match against Denmark. On 6 October, Ronaldo publicly criticised Jesus but apologised for leaving the squad. Despite the controversy, Jesus indicated that Ronaldo could return to the national team, while the forward reiterated his willingness to represent Portugal. Ronaldo later announced his retirement from national team on 5 November.

On 14 November, in the first match following Cristiano Ronaldo's departure, Portugal lost 4–1 to Denmark at the Estádio Municipal de Braga, in the penultimate match of the group stage of the 2026–27 UEFA Nations League, having already secured qualification. Before kick-off, the Portuguese players took to the pitch wearing shirts bearing the number 7, in tribute to their "eternal captain". The Portuguese Football Federation also introduced a new design for the number 7, which was worn for the first time in this match by Carlos Forbs, who came on in the 63rd minute but neither scored nor provided an assist. During the seventh minute, while the score remained goalless, supporters paid a brief tribute to Cristiano Ronaldo. After Denmark scored their fourth goal in the 75th minute, many Portuguese supporters left the stadium, while others chanted Cristiano Ronaldo's name. At the post-match press conference, a journalist asked Jorge Jesus whether he missed Cristiano Ronaldo, to which the manager replied: "Miss what?! Only if it were to keep me company. He doesn't play anymore, he's not here, he's already made his decision." It was Jorge Jesus's first defeat as manager of the Portugal national team and the national team's heaviest-ever home defeat in an official match.

== Kit evolution ==
=== Home kits ===
1921	1928	1945	1957	1966–68	1984–86	1986–88	1990–91	1991–93	1993–96

1996–97	1997–98	1998–2000	2000–02	2002–04	2004–06	2006–08	2008–10	2010–12	2012–14

2014–16	2016–18	2018–20	2020–22	2022–23	2024	2025	2025	2026–	2026–

=== Away kits ===
1966–68	1984–86	1986–88	1991–93	1993–96	1996–97	1997–98	1998–2000	2000–02	2002–04

2004–06	2005^{(against Rep. of Ireland)}	2006–07	2007	2008–10	2010–12	2012–13	2013–14	2014–15	2015–16

2016–18	2016–18 UEFA	2018–20	2020–22	2022–23	2022	2024	2024	2025	2026–

2026–

== Previous squads ==
FIFA World Cup

- 2026 FIFA World Cup squad
- 2022 FIFA World Cup squad
- 2018 FIFA World Cup squad
- 2014 FIFA World Cup squad
- 2010 FIFA World Cup squad
- 2006 FIFA World Cup squad
- 2002 FIFA World Cup squad
- 1986 FIFA World Cup squad
- 1966 FIFA World Cup squad

UEFA European Championship

- UEFA Euro 2024 squad
- UEFA Euro 2020 squad
- UEFA Euro 2016 squad
- UEFA Euro 2012 squad
- UEFA Euro 2008 squad
- UEFA Euro 2004 squad
- UEFA Euro 2000 squad
- UEFA Euro 1996 squad
- UEFA Euro 1984 squad

UEFA Nations League Finals

- 2025 UEFA Nations League Finals squad
- 2019 UEFA Nations League Finals squad

FIFA Confederations Cup

- 2017 FIFA Confederations Cup squad

Summer Olympics Football Tournament

- 2016 Summer Olympics squad
- 2004 Summer Olympics squad
- 1996 Summer Olympics squad
- 1928 Summer Olympics squad
- italic denotes squad comprised by non-main team players

== Player records ==
=== World Cup and European Championship ===
Most goals scored in one World Cup
9 – Eusébio (1966)
Most goals scored in World Cup
11 – Cristiano Ronaldo (2006, 2010, 2014, 2018, 2022 and 2026)
Most goals scored in one European Championship
5 – Cristiano Ronaldo (2020)
Most goals scored in European Championship
14 – Cristiano Ronaldo (2004, 2008, 2012, 2016 and 2020)
Oldest goalscorer
41 years, 4 months and 27 days – Cristiano Ronaldo (2–1 against Croatia on 2 July 2026)
Youngest goalscorer
17 years, 9 months and 25 days – Fernando Chalana (2–1 against Cyprus on 5 December 1976)
Most hat-tricks
10 – Cristiano Ronaldo (includes four goals against Andorra on 7 October 2016 and Lithuania on 10 September 2019)
Most pokers
2 – Cristiano Ronaldo
Youngest player to score a hat-trick
20 years, 11 months and 4 days – André Silva (6–0 against Faroe Islands on 10 October 2016)

=== Other records ===
Most matches played in World Cup
27 – Cristiano Ronaldo (2006, 2010, 2014, 2018, 2022 and 2026)
Most matches played in European Championship
30 – Cristiano Ronaldo (2004, 2008, 2012, 2016, 2020 and 2024)
Oldest player (outfield or goalkeeper)
41 years, 7 months and 19 days – Cristiano Ronaldo (1–0 against Wales on 24 November 2026)
Longest national career (outfield or goalkeeper)
23 years, 1 month and 4 days – Cristiano Ronaldo (from 20 August 2003 to 24 September 2026)
Youngest debutant
17 years, 6 months and 24 days – Paulo Futre (5–0 against Finland on 21 September 1983)
Youngest player to reach 100 caps
27 years, 8 months and 11 days – Cristiano Ronaldo (1–1 against Northern Ireland on 16 October 2012)
Youngest player to reach 200 caps
38 years, 4 months and 15 days – Cristiano Ronaldo (1–0 against Iceland on 20 June 2023)

== Managers ==
As of 6 July 2026

Manager	Period	Record				
Manager	Period	Matches	Won	Draw	Lost	Win %
(Portugal) Committee	1921–1923	3	0	0	3	0.00
(Portugal) Ribeiro dos Reis	1925–1926	5	1	0	4	20.00
(Portugal) Cândido de Oliveira	1926–1929, 1935–1945, 1952	28	6	9	13	21.43
(Portugal) Maia Loureiro	1929	1	0	0	1	0.00
(Portugal) Laurindo Grijó	1930	4	2	0	2	50.00
(Portugal) Tavares da Silva	1931, 1945–1947, 1951, 1955–1957	29	10	4	15	34.48
(Portugal) Salvador do Carmo	1932–1933, 1950, 1953–1954	12	3	4	5	25.00
(Portugal) Virgílio Paula	1947–1948	3	1	0	2	33.33
(Portugal) Armando Sampaio	1949	4	1	1	2	25.00
(Portugal) José Maria Antunes	1957–1960, 1962–1964, 1968–1969	31	9	4	18	29.03
(Portugal) Armando Ferreira	1961, 1962	6	1	1	4	16.67
(Portugal) Fernando Peyroteo	1961	2	0	0	2	0.00
(Portugal) Manuel da Luz Afonso	1964–1966	20	15	2	3	75.00
(Portugal) José Gomes da Silva	1967, 1970–1971	13	5	4	4	38.46
(Portugal) José Augusto	1972–1973	15	9	4	2	60.00
(Portugal) José Maria Pedroto	1974–1976	15	6	4	5	40.00
(Portugal) Juca	1977–1978, 1980–1982, 1987–1989	34	15	7	12	44.12
(Portugal) Mário Wilson	1978–1980	10	5	2	3	50.00
(Brazil) Otto Glória	1964–1966, 1982–1983	7	3	1	3	42.86
(Portugal) Fernando Cabrita	1983–1984	9	5	2	2	55.56
(Portugal) José Augusto Torres	1984–1986	17	8	1	8	47.06
(Portugal) Ruy Seabra	1986–1987	6	1	4	1	16.67
(Portugal) Artur Jorge	1990–1991, 1996–1997	26	11	10	5	42.31
(Portugal) Carlos Queiroz	1991–1993, 2008–2010	49	25	16	8	54.35
(Portugal) Nelo Vingada	1994	2	0	2	0	0.00
(Portugal) António Oliveira	1994–1996, 2000–2002	43	25	10	8	58.14
(Portugal) Humberto Coelho	1997–2000	24	16	4	4	66.67
(Portugal) Agostinho Oliveira	2002–2003	6	2	3	2	33.33
(Brazil) Luiz Felipe Scolari	2003–2008	74	42	18	14	56.76
(Portugal) Carlos Queiroz	2008–2010	32	18	10	4	55.56
(Portugal) Paulo Bento	2010–2014	44	24	11	9	54.55
(Portugal) Fernando Santos	2014–2022	109	67	23	19	61.47
(Spain) Roberto Martínez	2023–2026	45	30	9	6	66.67
