= Rui Varela =

Portuguese footballer

Personal information
- Full name: Rui Manuel da Costa Varela
- Date of birth: 9 August 1983 (age 43)
- Place of birth: Alhos Vedros, Portugal
- Height: 1.90 m (6 ft 3 in)
- Position: Forward

Youth career
- 1995–1996: Moitense
- 1996–1998: 1º de Maio Sarilhense
- 1998–2001: Moitense
- 2001–2002: Benfica

Senior career*
Years	Team	Apps	(Gls)
2002	Benfica B	9	(0)
2003	Juventude de Évora	?	(8)
2003–2004	Atlético		
2004–2005	Barreirense	32	(2)
2005–2006	Atlético	31	(19)
2006–2008	Olivais Moscavide	42	(14)
2007	→ Atlético (loan)	12	(3)
2008–2009	Estrela Amadora	21	(2)
2009–2010	Beira-Mar	38	(8)
2011–2012	Belenenses	28	(0)
2012–2014	Atlético	71	(16)
2014–2015	Mafra	30	(12)
2015–2016	Loures	16	(2)
2016–2017	Cova Piedade	42	(9)
2017–2018	Sintrense	11	(4)
2018	Vilafranquense	18	(3)
Total		401	(102)
- * Club domestic league appearances and goals

Rui Manuel da Costa Varela (born 9 August 1983 in Alhos Vedros, Moita, Setúbal District) is a Portuguese former professional footballer who played as a forward.
