= Sarilhos Pequenos =

- Civil parish
- Location in Portugal
- Coordinates: 38°40′54″N 8°58′55″W
- Country: Portugal
- Region: Lisbon
- Metropolitan area: Lisbon
- District: Setúbal
- Municipality: Moita
- Disbanded: 2013

Area
  - Total: 3.79 km^{2} (1.46 sq mi)
- Elevation: 8 m (26 ft)

Population (2001)
  - Total: 2,049
  - Density: 540/km^{2} (1,400/sq mi)
- Time zone: UTC+00:00 (WET)
  - Summer (DST): UTC+01:00 (WEST)
- Postal code: 2860-666
- Area code: 212
- Website: jfsarilhospequenos.no.comunidades.net

Sarilhos Pequenos is town on the south margin of the Tagus River, near Lisbon, Portugal. Once a civil parish in the municipality of Moita, in the district of Setúbal, it merged in 2013 into the new parish of Gaio-Rosário e Sarilhos Pequenos. With an area of approximately 3.79 square kilometres (1.46 sq mi), the population of Sarilhos Pequenos was 1150 in 2011 (census data).

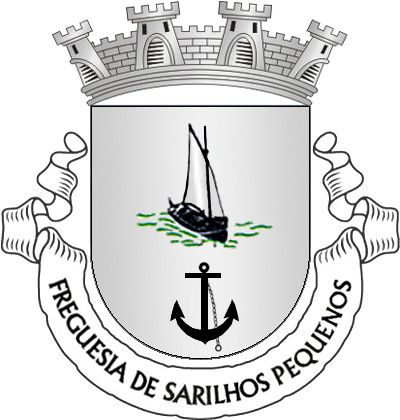
Coat of Arms

== History ==
Sarilhos Pequenos has been known historically as land of fishermen and fish-salters; until the 1960s-1970s, and for decades beforehand, 90% of its population was supported by the fishery from the ravines and rivers of the region.

Its name is derived from the conversion process used in transforming the saltwater into salt, using a wooden device or sarilho that would permit the entry of water into the salt-flats. The water would be contained in compartments protected by one metre (3.3 ft) walls (or margateiras), where evaporation would take place, and finally salt could be collected. Unlike the process encountered in Sarilhos Grandes, the people of this parish used smaller devices, thereby achieving their fame and the toponymy for the area. Although this work disappeared with modern techniques, much of this cultures legacy has remained in the brightly painted small residences and the fishing nets, now used to stop insects. Further, the dockyard also preserves the historical connection the parish has with the water, with the construction and repair of the typical Tagus fishing boats.

== Sport ==
Historically, the 1º de Maio Futebol Clube Sarilhense, known for raising some important football players, was founded on 5 January 1918, by then first president Orlando Santos. The club is considered the fourth oldest team in the district of Setúbal, whose roster included former local football star Manuel Fernandes (who played in the Sporting Club de Portugal and the Portugal national football team), later coach of Vitória F.C.

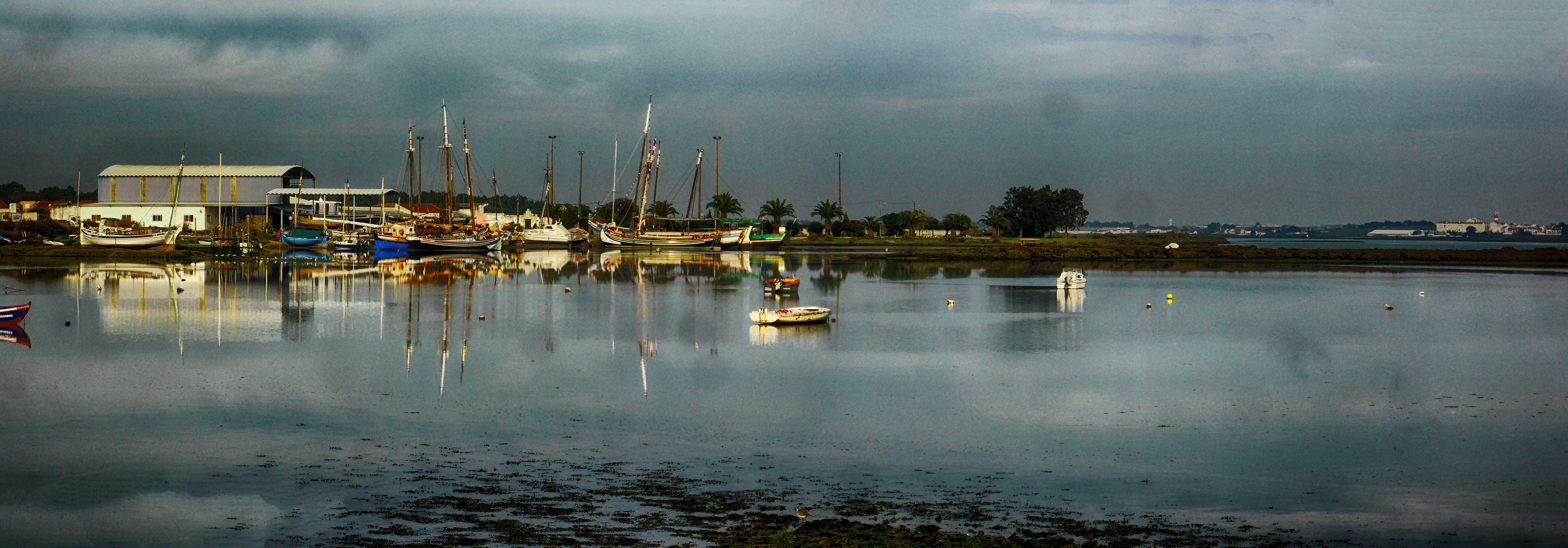
Shipyard and bay
