= Costeado =

Portuguese footballer

Personal information
- Full name: João Ribeiro da Silva
- Date of birth: 3 January 1959 (age 67)
- Place of birth: Creixomil, Portugal
- Height: 1.72 m (5 ft 8 in)
- Position: Right back

Youth career
- 1972–1977: Vitória Guimarães

Senior career*
| Years | Team | Apps | (Gls) |
| 1977–1978 | Vitória Guimarães | 1 | (0) |
| 1978–1981 | Fafe | 53 | (2) |
| 1981–1983 | Salgueiros | 65 | (3) |
| 1983–1988 | Vitória Guimarães | 119 | (1) |
| 1988–1989 | Beira-Mar | 35 | (1) |
| 1989–1991 | Estrela Amadora | 8 | (0) |
| 1991–1992 | Penafiel | 5 | (0) |
| 1992–1995 | Ronfe | | |
| Total | | 286 | (7) |

International career
| 1987 | Portugal | 4 | (0) |

Managerial career
- 1995: Ronfe
- 1996–1997: Paços Ferreira
- * Club domestic league appearances and goals

João Ribeiro da Silva (born 3 January 1959), known as Costeado, is a Portuguese retired footballer who played as a right back.

== Football career ==
Costeado was born in the village of Creixomil, Guimarães. During his professional career he played for Vitória de Guimarães (two spells, playing European competitions in the second), AD Fafe, S.C. Salgueiros, S.C. Beira-Mar, C.F. Estrela da Amadora and F.C. Penafiel; he also spent two years in amateur football with local Juventude de Ronfe, before retiring in 1995 at the age of 36.

Costeado was one of many players propelled to represent the Portugal national team following the Saltillo Affair at the 1986 FIFA World Cup, and would win four caps during the following year. Over 11 seasons, he amassed Primeira Liga totals of 197 matches and five goals.

Subsequently, Costeado worked as goalkeeper coach for several clubs, including his main one Vitória from 1998 to 2004.
