= Jorge Martins =

Portuguese footballer

Personal information
- Full name: Jorge Manuel Martins da Silva
- Date of birth: 12 August 1954 (age 72)
- Place of birth: Alhos Vedros, Portugal
- Height: 1.78 m (5 ft 10 in)
- Position: Goalkeeper

Youth career
- 1969–1970: Real Massamá
- 1970–1973: Barreirense

Senior career*
Years	Team	Apps	(Gls)
1973–1980	Barreirense	284	(0)
1977–1978	→ Vitória Setúbal (loan)	14	(0)
1980–1982	Benfica	2	(0)
1982–1983	Farense	27	(0)
1983–1985	Vitória Setúbal	56	(0)
1985–1989	Belenenses	136	(0)
1989–1992	Vitória Setúbal	84	(0)
Total		603	(0)

International career
1978	Portugal U21	1	(0)
Medal record
Men's football
Representing Portugal
UEFA European Championship
Bronze medal – third place	1984 France
- * Club domestic league appearances and goals

Jorge Manuel Martins da Silva (born 12 August 1954), known as Martins, is a Portuguese retired professional footballer who played as a goalkeeper.

== Club career ==
Martins was born in Alhos Vedros, Moita, Setúbal District. During his professional career, which spanned 19 years, he played for F.C. Barreirense, Vitória de Setúbal (three spells), S.L. Benfica, S.C. Farense and C.F. Os Belenenses, appearing in more than 600 matches as a professional, 310 in the Primeira Liga alone.

On 28 May 1989, Martins' Belenenses won the Taça de Portugal by defeating his former club Benfica 2–1 at the Estádio Nacional.

== International career ==
Martins was a participant at UEFA Euro 1984 and the 1986 FIFA World Cup, as a backup to Manuel Bento in the former tournament – he was also his reserve during his two-year spell at Benfica – and third-choice in the latter behind Bento and Vítor Damas. He never won a senior cap, however.

== Personal life ==
Martins was nicknamed Rambo and Stallone, due to physical similarities with the American actor and the fictional character he portrayed.

== Honours ==
Benfica

- Taça de Portugal: 1980–81
- Supertaça Cândido de Oliveira: 1980

Belenenses

- Taça de Portugal: 1988–89
