= José António (footballer, born 1957) =

Portuguese footballer

Personal information
- Full name: José António Prudêncio Conde Bargiela
- Date of birth: 29 October 1957
- Place of birth: Cascais, Portugal
- Date of death: 2 June 2005 (aged 47)
- Place of death: Carcavelos, Portugal
- Height: 1.82 m (6 ft 0 in)
- Position: Centre-back

Youth career
- 1972–1973: Carcavelos
- 1973–1976: Benfica

Senior career*
Years	Team	Apps	(Gls)
1976–1978	Benfica	0	(0)
1978–1983	Estoril	143	(8)
1983–1991	Belenenses	196	(8)
Total		339	(16)

International career
1975	Portugal U16	1	(0)
1976	Portugal U18	6	(0)
1978–1979	Portugal U21	5	(0)
1985–1986	Portugal	3	(0)

Managerial career
- 1993–1994: Belenenses
- * Club domestic league appearances and goals

José António Prudéncio Conde Bargiela (29 October 1957 – 2 June 2005), known as José António, was a Portuguese footballer who played as a central defender.

== Club career ==
José António was born in Cascais. Following an unassuming two-year spell at S.L. Benfica, where he also played youth football, he moved to neighbours G.D. Estoril Praia where he established himself as a professional.

In summer 1983, José António signed with C.F. Os Belenenses – also in Lisbon – where he would remain the next two decades in several capacities. On 28 May 1989, already an undisputed starter and captain, he lifted the Taça de Portugal after a 2–1 win over Benfica.

José António retired at age 33, having appeared in 163 games for the club in the Primeira Liga. During the 1993–94 season, he had a very brief coaching spell with Belenenses as one of three managers, as the team eventually avoided relegation.

== International career ==
José António only earned three caps for Portugal, but his first and last produced memorable results: on 16 October 1985, 13 days shy of his 28th birthday, he helped the national side achieve a 1–0 win in West Germany for the 1986 FIFA World Cup qualifiers.

In the finals in Mexico, José António appeared in the first match against England, another 1–0 victory. The competition, however, was tainted by the Saltillo Affair in which the squad was involved, and Portugal eventually crashed out in the group stage and the player was never recalled again.

== Death ==
On 2 June 2005, José António was taking part in a pickup game with some friends in Carcavelos, but felt indisposed only a few minutes after its start. Having already left the pitch, he suddenly collapsed and died; all resuscitation attempts were in vain.

José António was 47, and never married. From an early age onwards, he developed a baldness condition.

== Honours ==
Belenenses

- Taça de Portugal: 1988–89
