= Saltillo Affair =

Portuguese issues at the 1986 FIFA World Cup

The Saltillo Affair (Portuguese: O Caso Saltilho) was a series of controversies surrounding the Portugal national football team during its participation in the Mexico 1986 FIFA World Cup. The affair was named after the Mexican city of Saltillo, Coahuila, in which the team was headquartered for the competition, and also the place where the majority of the described events occurred.

The team had qualified for only one previous World Cup tournament, in 1966, in which it finished third. Following a difficult qualification, the 1986 campaign did not start well with the suspicion of doping falling on one of the players who had been selected for the tournament. Although that test was later proven wrong, that was the first of many controversies to affect the team in the following weeks, including threats of strikes from the players, the announcement of a series of demands to the Portuguese Federation and reports of inappropriate behaviour at the team's headquarters. The Saltillo Affair remains a significant controversy in the history of Portuguese football.

== Background ==
Having achieved third place in the England 1966 World Cup, several years elapsed before Portugal qualified again for a major football competition. This happened when they reached Euro 1984, where they advanced to the semi-finals, being beaten only in extra time by the hosts and soon to be champions France.

Portugal qualified one point ahead of Sweden for the Mexico World Cup thanks to a last-game victory against already-qualified leaders West Germany in Stuttgart. Nicknaming them Os Infantes, with an anthem sung by José Estebes (a fictional Porto native sports reporter with a stereotypical deep accent and fondness for wine, created by Portuguese humorist Herman José), the Portuguese had high hopes for their national team.

== Before the World Cup ==
One of the key issues initially tackled was how to deal with altitude. While only one of three matches of the group stage were played in altitude – two games in Monterrey (537 m) and one in Guadalajara (1600 m) – it was argued that the team should also prepare for games in Mexico City (2238 m), and so decided that the headquarters should be in Saltillo, neighbouring the England team.

With problems scoring goals during the preparation matches, national team manager José Augusto Torres wanted to call up Rui Jordão, one of the key players two years before in France, who had not played the whole season due to a quarrel with his manager. On the other hand, Manuel Fernandes, who had had one of his best seasons, scoring 30 goals, was not an acceptable option for Torres, to the dismay of Sporting fans. The team was eventually announced on 19 April:

- Goalkeepers: Manuel Bento, Vítor Damas and Jorge Martins
- Defenders: João Pinto, António Morato, Pedro Venâncio, Augusto Inácio, António Veloso, José António, Frederico Rosa, Álvaro Magalhães and Sobrinho
- Midfielders: Jaime Magalhães, Carlos Manuel, Jaime Pacheco, António André, António Sousa, Paulo Futre and José Ribeiro
- Forwards: Diamantino Miranda, Rui Águas and Fernando Gomes

Hours before leaving Portugal on 10 May, Veloso tested positive for Primobolan, an anabolic steroid. This led to initial tensions between players, the FPF, and Benfica, Veloso's club, between claims of innocence and accusations of improper player care, woke Fernando Bandeirinha at 2 o'clock in the morning and rushed him to the airport as a substitute.

After a questionable decision about the air trip to Mexico (it was decided that instead of flying directly to Mexico City, the team should travel via Frankfurt and Dallas), on arrival it was clear that the Portuguese organisation cared too much about altitude training, neglecting other aspects. The hotel, although suitable, had no safety measures, which meant it was often crowded with national and foreign reporters; the training field was sloping and poorly prepared; and local amateur teams were invited for preparation matches.

Presented as a peaceful city, Saltillo proved to be anything but that. Reports suggested players were interested in shopping in nearby Laredo, Texas, in the United States, during their time off. A local organisation delegate (grandson of a politician, known for being a small-time con artist) offered to go there and purchase the goods for the Portuguese, but after helping himself to the money, never returned.

A game that was staged against a team composed of local workers (presented as a "good challenge" by the Mexican authorities) ended in a comical display where Diamantino reportedly participated in an interview during a match. Chile was willing to play, but the fee they asked was not met by Portuguese federation delegates. Rumours that the players were "jumping the fence" broke in Portugal, which led to their wives flooding the telephone lines for clarification on the issue. By then, the authority of Amândio de Carvalho, vice-president of the Portuguese Football Federation faced challenges in maintaining control within the team, and president Silva Resende refused to leave Mexico City.

While the first days increased the tension between the elements of the national team, the worst was yet to come. Reports indicate that players considered striking over disputes regarding prize allocations, beginning a war of press releases between them and the federation. On 25 May the players dropped the bomb, refusing to play in a preparation match and further matches unless the situation was dealt with. The protest led to widespread criticism from the Portuguese press, fans, club directors and the international press tagged the incident as "ridiculous", but still took sides with the players due to the situations described by the players, which included being forced to advertise certain products (Adidas and a local brand of beer) without being paid.

== The World Cup ==
After withdrawing some demands (and working around others, like wearing their training equipment inside out so that they did not display any brands), Portugal played their opening game against England, beating the odds and winning the game with a single goal of Carlos Manuel, the Hero of Stuttgart (and said to be the head of the protesting players), which apparently opened the road to the knockout stage.

Futre, expected to be the revelation of the World Cup, did not play due to Torres wanting to keep a balance between clubs in the starting eleven (Futre played together with Fernando Gomes in FC Porto), and calling him the "secret weapon". Days later, Bento broke a leg during practice playing as a forward, which ended his career with the national team. He was replaced by Damas, one of the best goalkeepers in Portuguese history, but he was not prepared and fell into depression. The victory against England was followed by a defeat against Poland.

This left the decision to the last game against Morocco, knowing a tie would qualify both teams, but the game ended with a humiliating 3–1 defeat. As the Portuguese team, last in their group, returned home, the press heavily criticized Portuguese football management and players.

== Aftermath ==
José Torres stepped down and was replaced by Ruy Seabra for the Euro 1988 campaign, while removing several players from the national team – Diamantino, Jaime Pacheco, João Pinto, Sobrinho, Fernando Gomes, Paulo Futre and Carlos Manuel. This "team of change" did not endure much, as after a compromising home draw against Malta (which Seabra considered to be a "good display for those who like football") roughly a year after, Seabra was dismissed and replaced with Juca Pereira, which progressively recalled some of the suspended players. The damage, however, was already done, and Portugal would not qualify again for an international competition until Euro 1996.

== History repeats itself ==
The next time Portugal would play in the World Cup, in 2002, saw many parallels to the country's experience in 1986:

- The previous European Championship also saw a strong result by Portugal—in Euro 2000, Portugal again reached the semi-finals, where they were again beaten by France in extra time.
- Although Portugal had less trouble qualifying in 2002, finishing atop their qualifying group, they suffered a similar compromising result during pre-World Cup friendlies, being thumped 4–1 in Porto by Finland.
- As in 1986, a player on the original World Cup roster was suspended for doping, this time Daniel Kenedy.
- Shopping sprees by players, this time in Macau, were also widely reported in the Portuguese press.
- The 2002 preparation also saw questionable managing choices and some amateurism, including the same lack of agreement on prizes.
- Like in 1986, Portugal and its last group rival (South Korea this time) only needed to draw in order to both accomplish qualification to the knockout round. Portugal lost 1-0 and was eliminated.

Portugal was again eliminated during the group stages in Korea/Japan, mirroring their 1986 performance. Since 1986, the word Saltillo has become synonymous with poor management at the higher levels of Portuguese football.
