= Gaio-Rosário e Sarilhos Pequenos =

- Civil parish
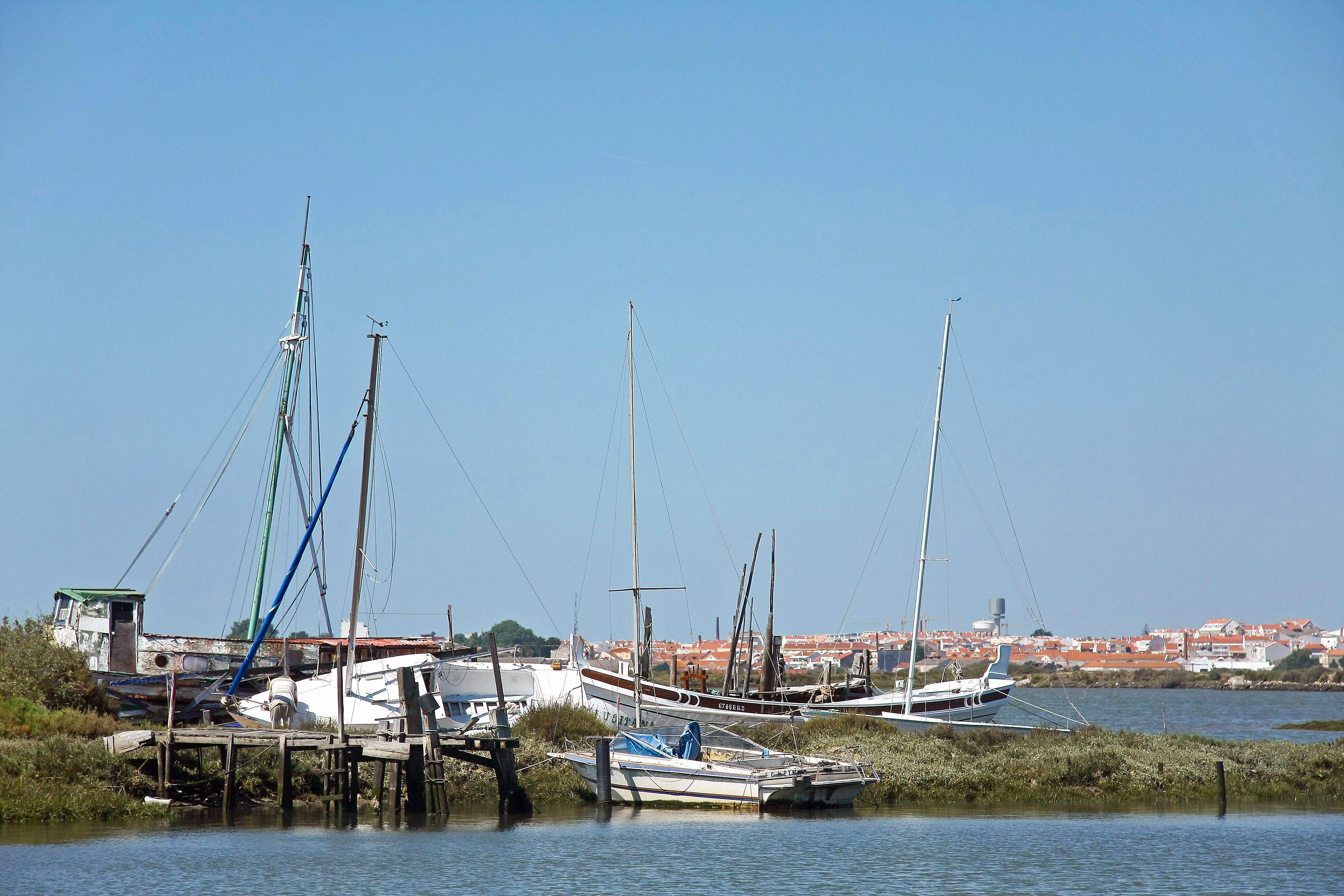

- Location in Portugal
- Coordinates: 38.67°N 9.00°W
- Country: Portugal
- Region: Lisbon
- Metropolitan area: Lisbon
- District: Setúbal
- Municipality: Moita

Area
  - Total: 14.12 km^{2} (5.45 sq mi)

Population (2011)
  - Total: 2,377
  - Density: 168.3/km^{2} (436.0/sq mi)
- Time zone: UTC+00:00 (WET)
  - Summer (DST): UTC+01:00 (WEST)

Gaio-Rosário e Sarilhos Pequenos is a civil parish in the municipality of Moita, Portugal. It was formed in 2013 by the merger of the former parishes of Gaio-Rosário and Sarilhos Pequenos, respectively. The population in 2011 was 2,377, in an area of 14.12 km^{2}.

Website: http://www.uf-grsp.com/
