= Carolina Santos =

Carolina Ribeiro de Almeida
- Born: Carolina Santos; 1986 (age 39–40); Alhos Vedros
- Occupations: legal adviser, model and television actress

Carolina Santos (born Carolina Ribeiro de Almeida in 1986 in Alhos Vedros) is a Portuguese legal adviser, model and television actress. Since June 2016, she became the Portuguese "Trivago Guy".
