= 1989 Taça de Portugal final =

- Event: 1988–89 Taça de Portugal
Belenenses	Benfica
2	1
- Date: 28 May 1989
- Venue: Estádio Nacional, Oeiras
- Referee: Alder Dante (Santarém)

The 1989 Taça de Portugal final was the final match of the 1988–89 Taça de Portugal, the 49th season of the Taça de Portugal, the premier Portuguese football cup competition organized by the Portuguese Football Federation (FPF). The match was played on 28 May 1989 at the Estádio Nacional in Oeiras, and opposed two Primeira Liga sides: Belenenses and Benfica. Belenenses defeated Benfica 2–1 to claim the Taça de Portugal for a third time in their history.

In Portugal, the final was televised live on RTP. As a result of Belenenses winning the Taça de Portugal, the Azuis do Restelo qualified for the 1989 Supertaça Cândido de Oliveira where they took on their cup opponents who won the 1988–89 Primeira Divisão.

== Match ==
=== Details ===
28 May 1989
15:00 WEST

Belenenses	2–1	Benfica
Faria 25'; Juanico 81'		Vata 73'

Estádio Nacional, Oeiras
Referee: Alder Dante (Santarém)

Belenenses	Benfica

GK	1	(Portugal) Jorge Martins
DF		(Portugal) Luís Sobrinho
DF		(Brazil) Jorge Baidek
DF		(Portugal) Álvaro Teixeira		(substituted off) 89'
DF		(Brazil) Zé Mário	(red card) 79'
DF	3	(Portugal) José António (c)
MF		(Brazil) Macaé	(yellow card) 4'
MF		(Portugal) Adão
MF	6	(Portugal) Juanico	(yellow card) 45'
FW	11	(Mozambique) Chiquinho Conde
FW	9	(Portugal) Chico Faria		(substituted off) 62'
Substitutes:
DF		(Portugal) Carlos Ribeiro		(substituted on) 89'
FW	16	(Angola) Manuel Saavedra		(substituted on) 62'
Manager:
(Brazil) Marinho Peres

GK	1	(Portugal) Silvino
RB	2	(Portugal) António Veloso	(yellow card) 27'
CB	5	(Brazil) Carlos Mozer
CB	3	(Brazil) Ricardo Gomes
LB	4	(Portugal) António Fonseca		(substituted off) 46'
MF	10	(Brazil) Valdo	(red card) 72'
MF		(Portugal) Diamantino Miranda (c)
MF		(Portugal) Vítor Paneira
FW		(Angola) Abel Campos
FW	9	(Sweden) Mats Magnusson
FW		(Portugal) António Pacheco
Substitutes:
FW	16	(Angola) Vata		(substituted on) 46'
Manager:
(Portugal) Toni

Match officials

- Assistant referees:
- Fourth official:

Match rules

- 90 minutes.
- 30 minutes of extra time if necessary.
- Maximum of two substitutions
