= Luís Sobrinho =

Portuguese footballer

Personal information
- Full name: Luís Fernando Peixoto Gonçalves Sobrinho
- Date of birth: 5 May 1961 (age 65)
- Place of birth: Setúbal, Portugal
- Height: 1.81 m (5 ft 11 in)
- Position: Centre-back

Youth career
- 1974–1980: Vitória Setúbal

Senior career*
Years	Team	Apps	(Gls)
1980–1982	Vitória Setúbal	48	(0)
1982–1983	Porto	0	(0)
1983–1985	Vitória Setúbal	54	(2)
1985–1989	Belenenses	127	(2)
1989–1990	Racing Paris	24	(0)
1990–1992	Vitória Setúbal	49	(2)
1992–1993	Paços Ferreira	17	(1)
1993–1994	Felgueiras	3	(0)
1994–1997	Grandolense		
Total		322	(7)

International career
1979	Portugal U16	3	(0)
1981–1983	Portugal U21	9	(0)
1988–1989	Portugal	8	(0)
- * Club domestic league appearances and goals

Luís Fernando Peixoto Gonçalves Sobrinho (born 5 May 1961) is a Portuguese former professional footballer who played as a central defender.

== Club career ==
Born in Setúbal, Sobrinho started playing professionally with local Vitória F.C. as a part of the club's youth system. After a solid second season in the Primeira Liga the 21-year-old signed with FC Porto, but failed to appear in any league matches as this coincided with his conscription, returning to his previous team one year later.

After two more campaigns with Vitória, Sobrinho joined C.F. Os Belenenses, experiencing some of his best years: he helped the Lisbon side to the third position in 1987–88, then played in both legs as they ousted UEFA Cup holders Bayer 04 Leverkusen in the competition's first round (2–0 on aggregate). The following domestic league brought a sixth place, and the season finished with a 2–1 win against S.L. Benfica in the Taça de Portugal, his only career trophy.

In summer 1989, Sobrinho moved to Racing Club de France Football in France, teaming up with his compatriot Jorge Plácido and a young David Ginola. After the club's relegation from Ligue 1, he returned to his country for a third stint with Setúbal, meeting the same fate in his first year.

Sobrinho returned briefly to the top flight with F.C. Paços de Ferreira, dropping shortly after to the Segunda Liga with F.C. Felgueiras. He retired at the age of 36 following a spell in amateur football with Clube Desportivo Artístico Grandolense, where he teamed up with former Vitória teammate António Aparício.

== International career ==
Sobrinho earned eight senior caps for Portugal, and was picked for the squad that appeared at the 1986 FIFA World Cup in Mexico, being an unused player in an eventual group-stage exit.
