= Ruy Seabra =

Portuguese lawyer and football manager

Ruy Seabra (born 1947) is a Portuguese lawyer and was briefly a football manager.

He had no football experience when he was announced as the choice of then President of the Portuguese Football Federation, Silva Resende, for manager of the Portugal national football team, after the disappointing presence at the 1986 World Cup finals, mostly due to the Saltillo Affair.

Seabra was officially the team selector, while Juca would be the coach for the UEFA Euro 1988 qualifying. The absence of all the members of the national team present at the recent World Cup, made the mission of qualifying almost impossible. The unlikely partnership lasted 6 matches, with one win, 4 draws and 1 loss. After the 2–2 draw with Malta, Seabra resigned and Juca assumed full functions for the rest of the qualifyings.
