= Moita =

Municipality in Setúbal District, Portugal

- Municipality
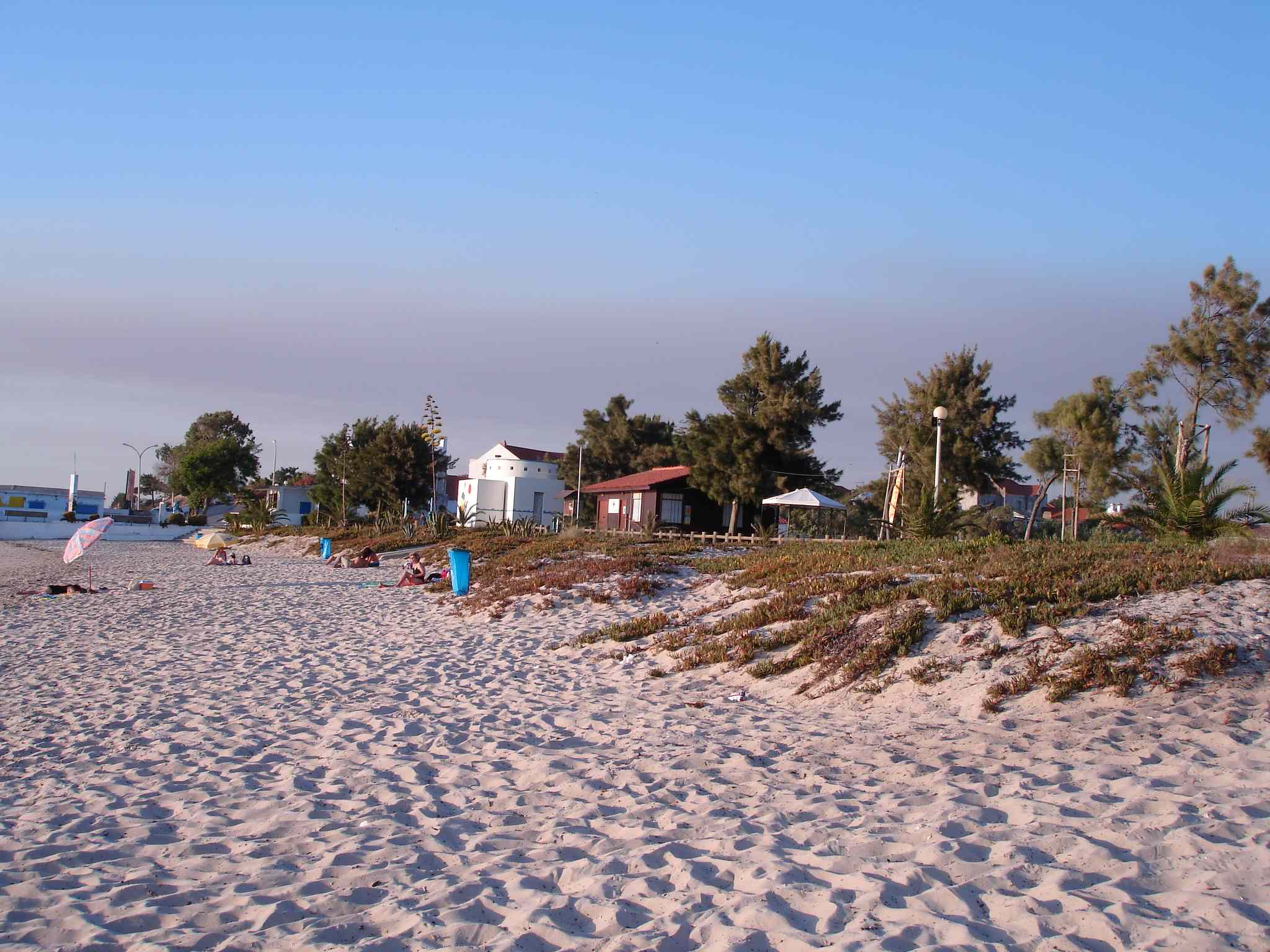
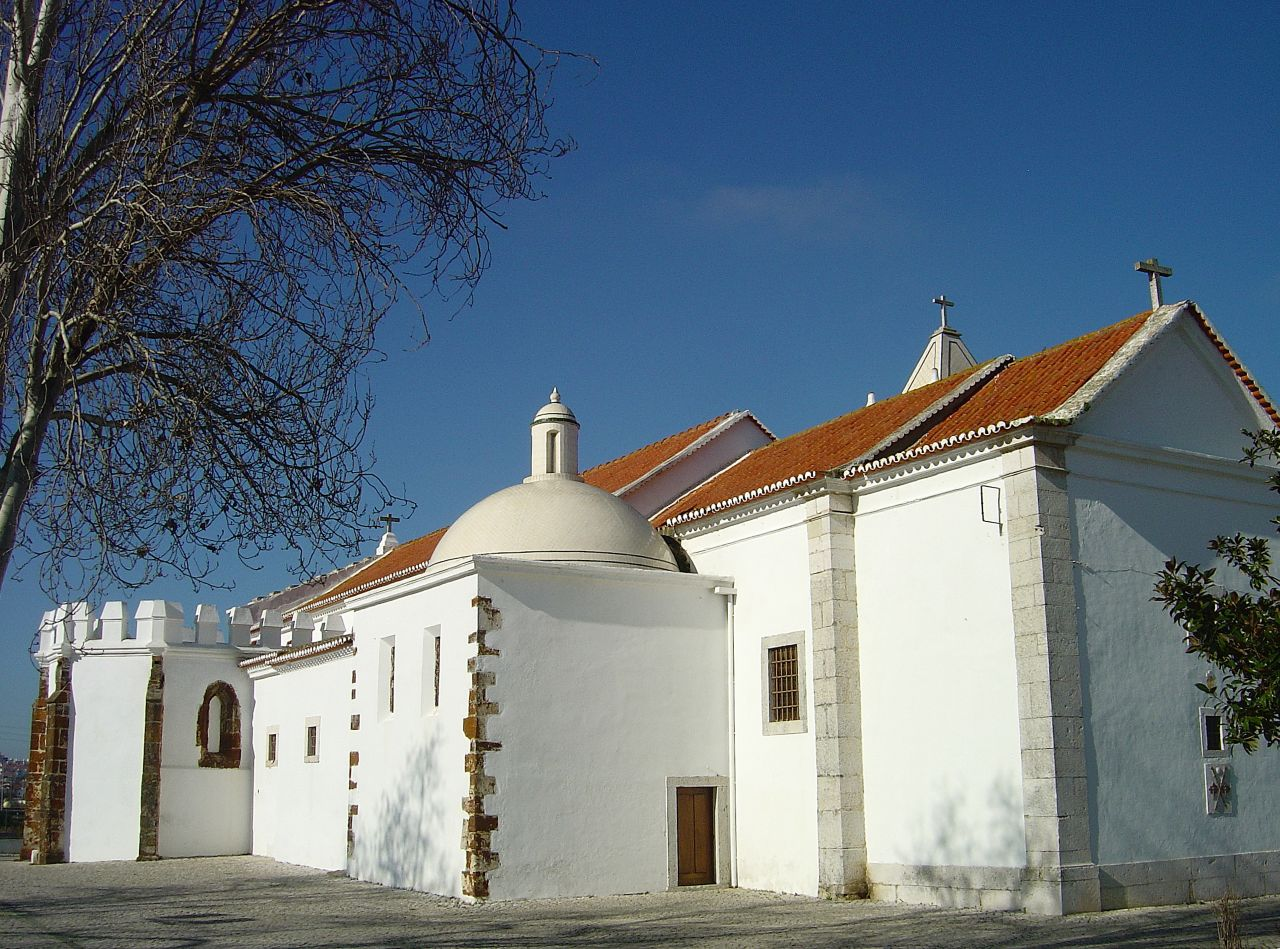
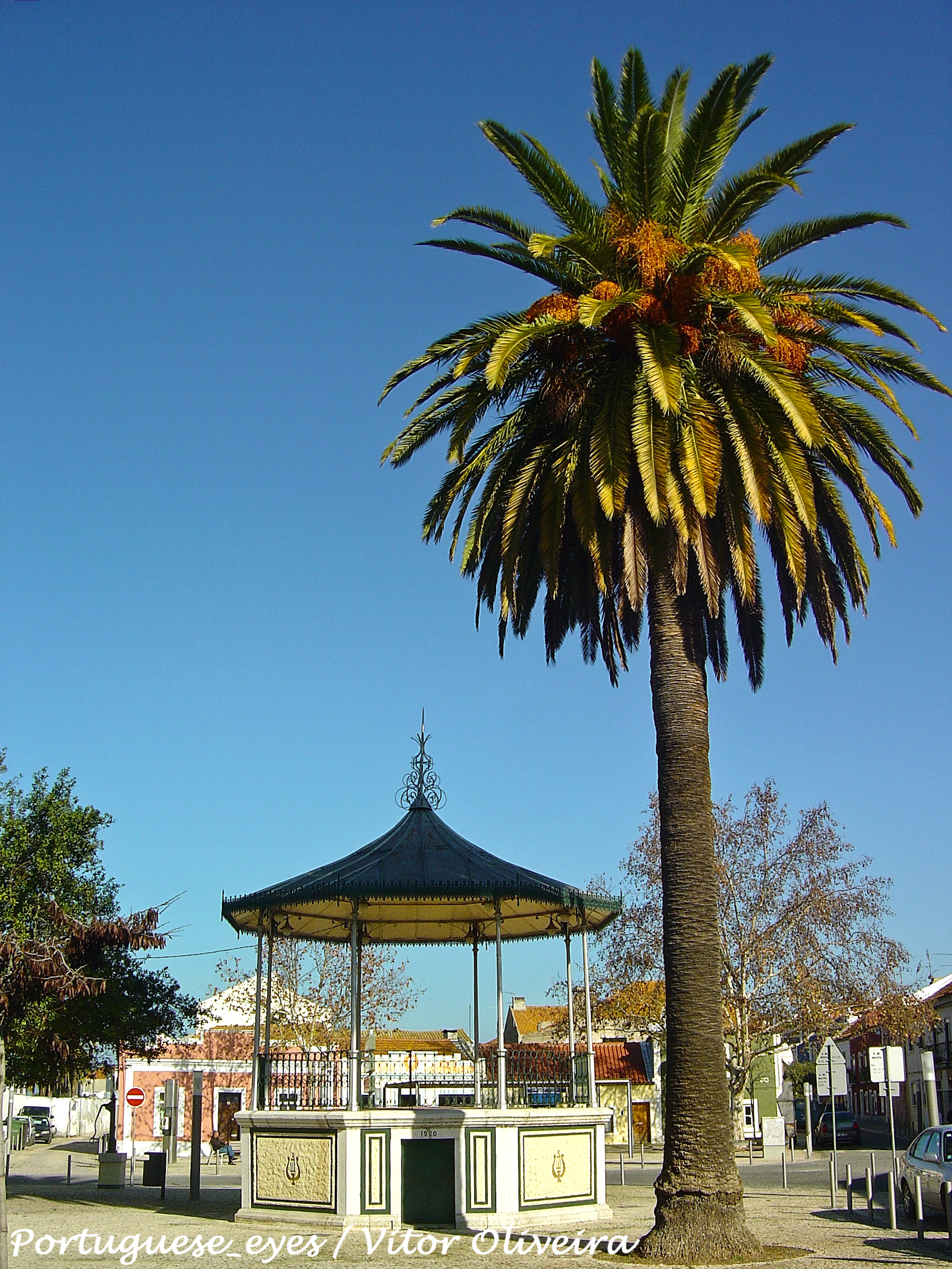
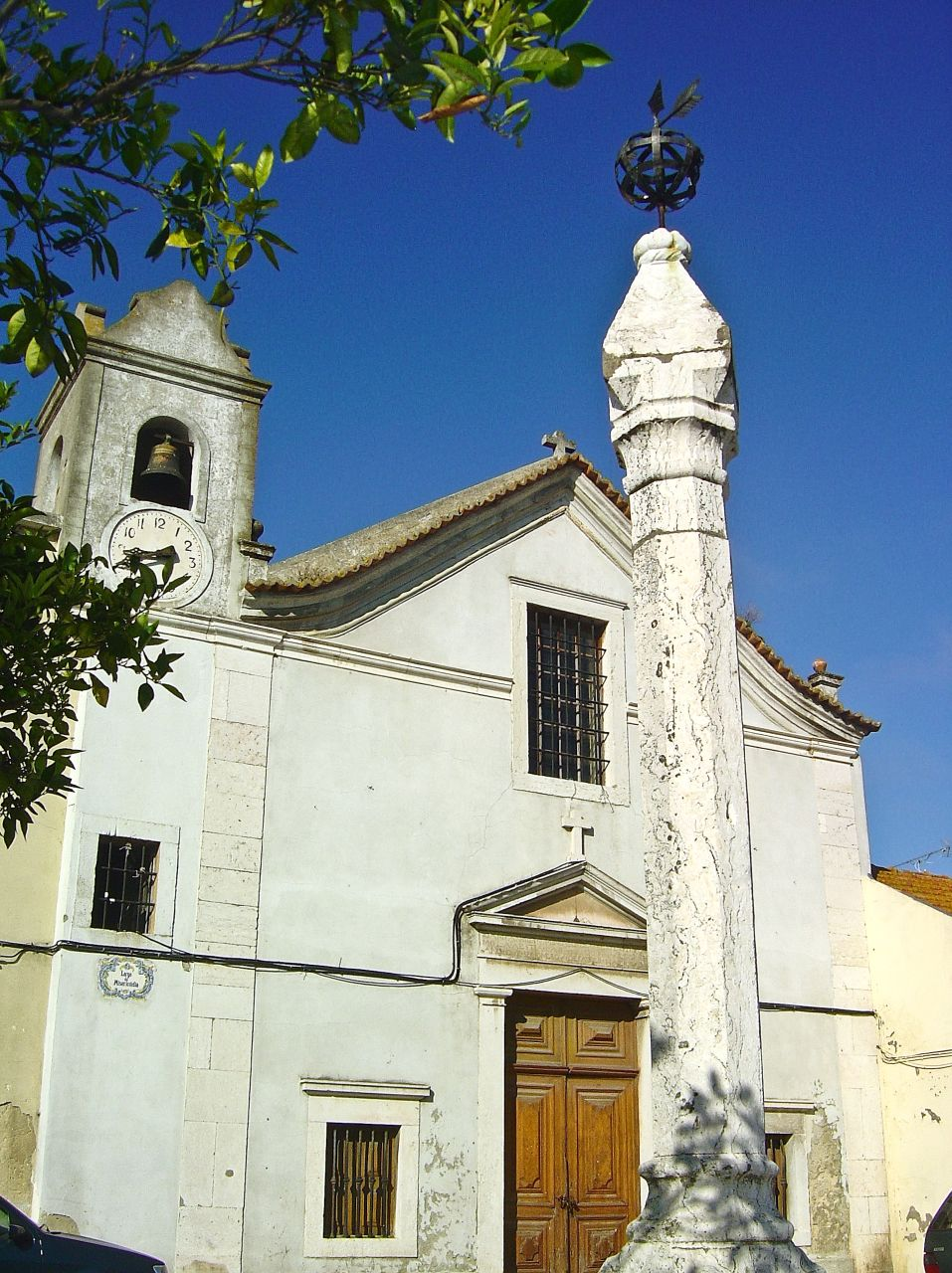
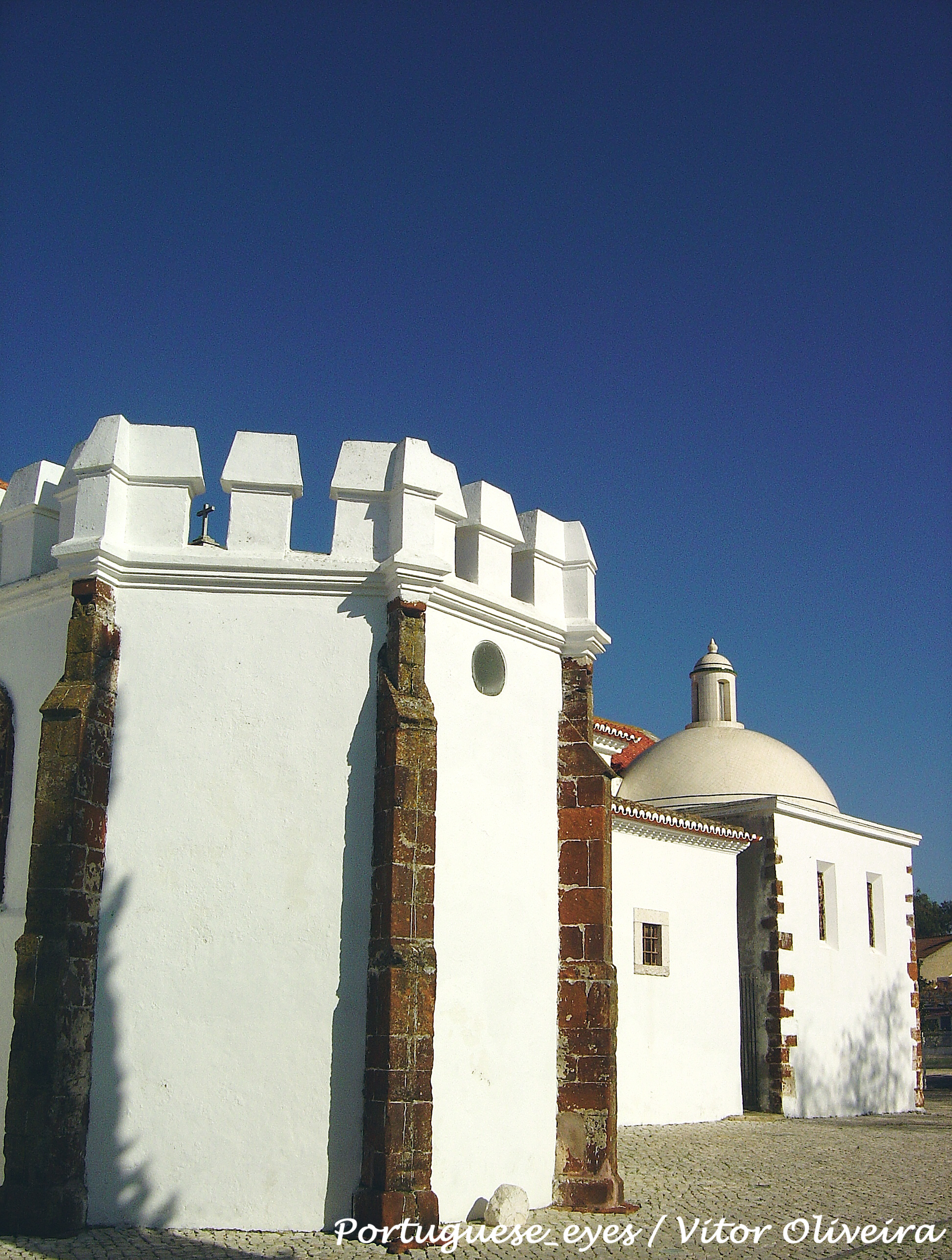
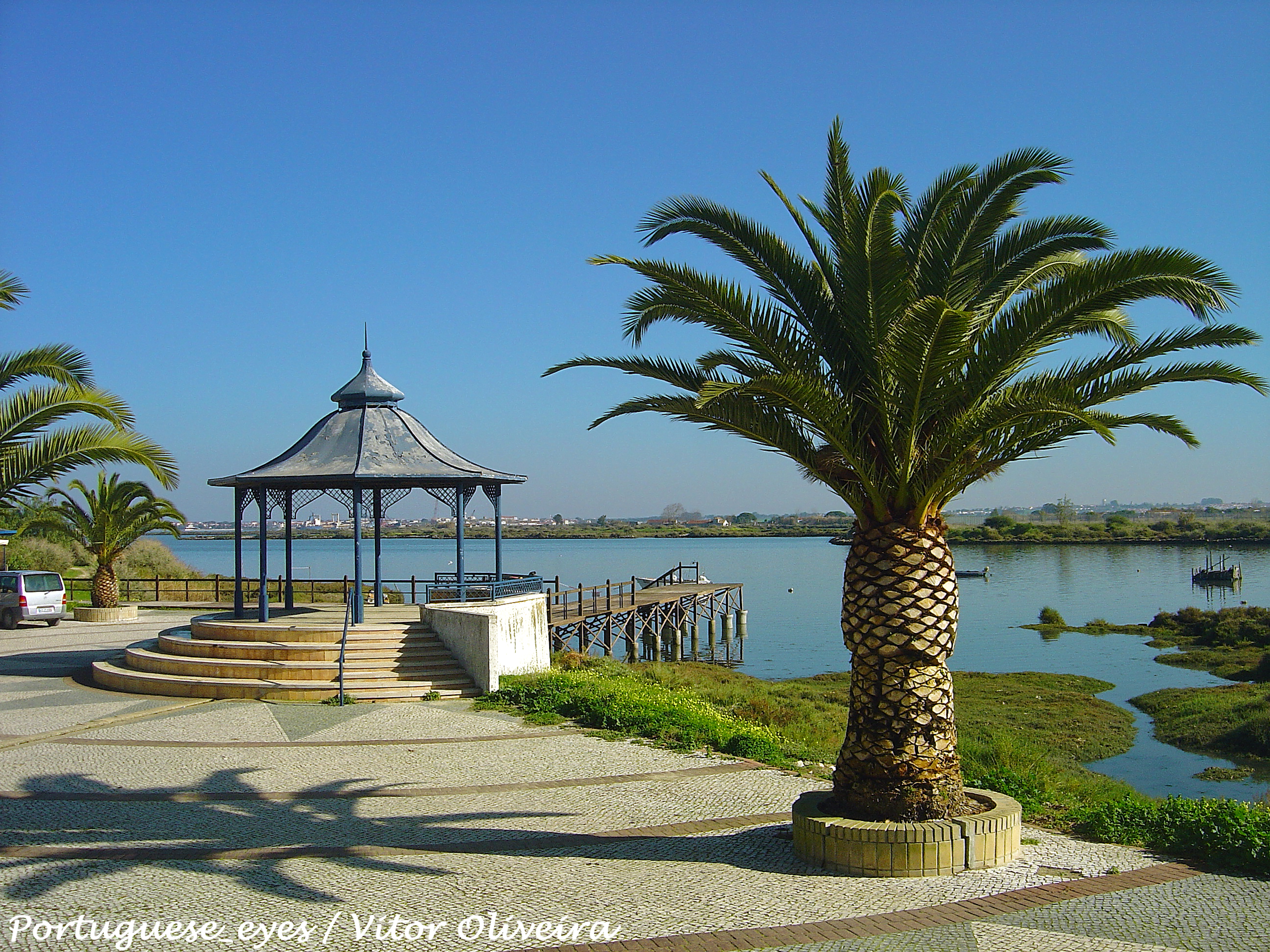
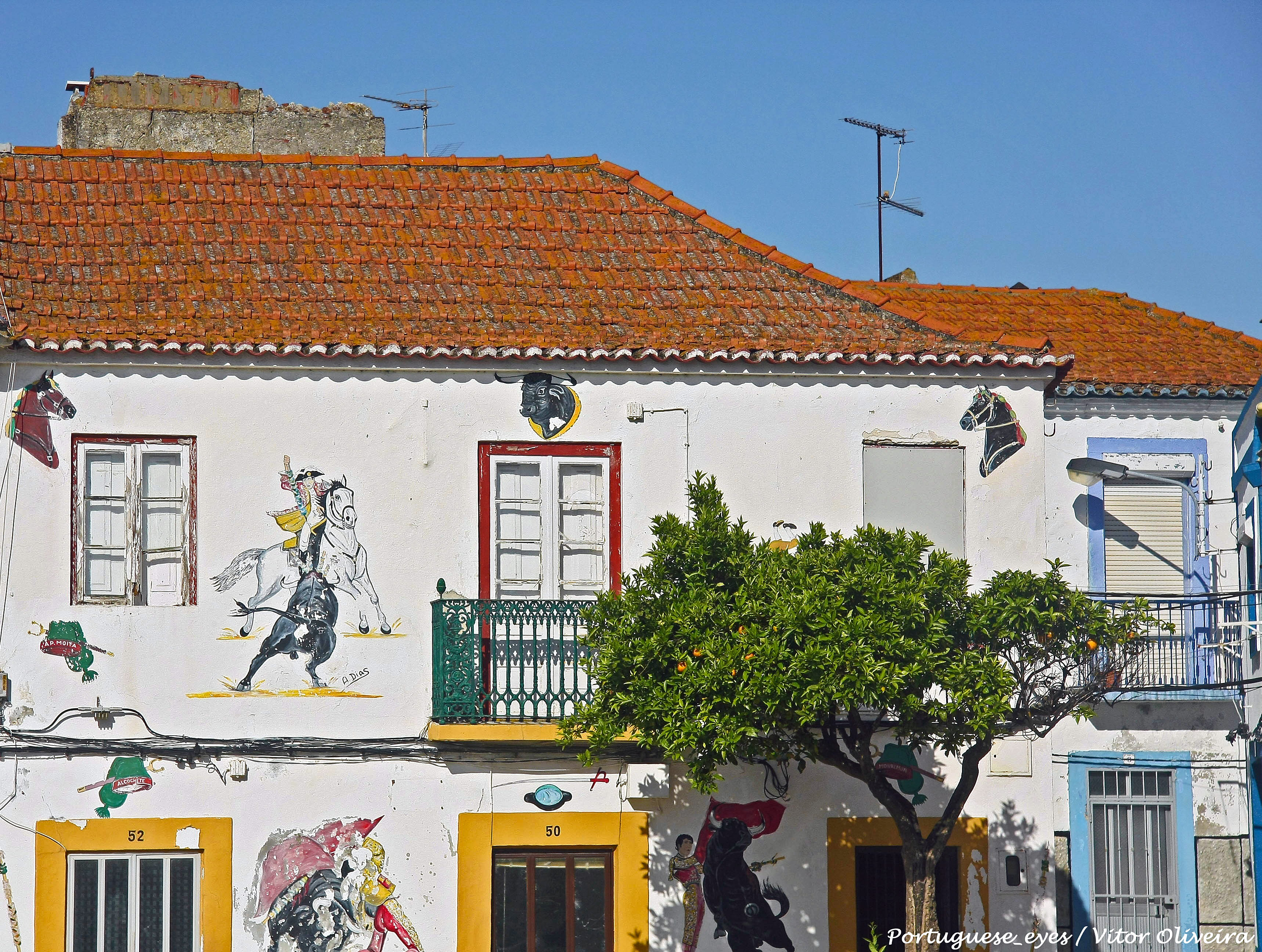

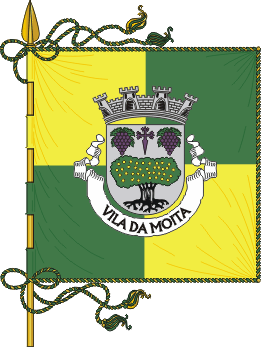
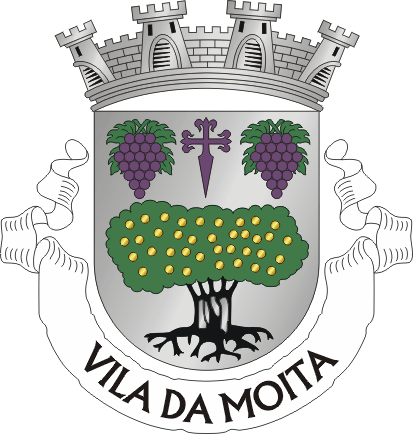
- Flag Coat of arms
- Interactive map of Moita
- Location in Portugal
- Coordinates: 38°39′N 08°59′W
- Country: Portugal
- Region: Lisbon
- Metropolitan area: Lisbon
- District: Setúbal
- Parishes: 4

Government
  - President: Rui Garcia (CDU)

Area
  - Total: 55.26 km^{2} (21.34 sq mi)

Population (2011)
  - Total: 66,029
  - Density: 1,195/km^{2} (3,095/sq mi)
- Time zone: UTC+00:00 (WET)
  - Summer (DST): UTC+01:00 (WEST)
- Local holiday: Tuesday after the 2nd Sunday of September
- Website: www.cm-moita.pt

Moita (pronounced [ˈmojtɐ]) is a municipality in the district of Setúbal in Portugal. The population in 2011 was 66,029, in an area of 55.26 km^{2}.

The municipality is part of the Greater Lisbon Area, with a demographic rate of 1.194,9/km2 in 2011, growing from 533,2/km2 in 1960. As part of Lisbon's suburban area, the population is mostly working age and senior individuals. The aging indicator (1 senior per 100 youngsters) is 106,9.

The present Mayor is Rui Garcia, elected by the Democratic Unity Coalition. The municipal holiday is the 1st Tuesday after the 2nd Sunday of September.

== Parishes ==
Administratively, the municipality is divided into 4 civil parishes (freguesias):

- Alhos Vedros
- Baixa da Banheira e Vale da Amoreira
- Moita
- Gaio-Rosário e Sarilhos Pequenos

== Notable people ==
- Ana de Mendonça (1460-1542) was a maid of Joanna la Beltraneja and mistress of King John II of Portugal
- Carolina Santos (born in 1986) a Portuguese legal adviser, model and TV actress

=== Sport ===
- Manuel Fernandes (born 1951) a football manager and former player with 485 club caps and 31 for Portugal
- Carlos Manuel (born 1958) a Portuguese retired footballer with 371 club caps and 43 for Portugal
- Diamantino Miranda (born 1959) a football manager and former player with 344 club caps and 22 for Portugal
- Neemias Queta (born 1999) an NBA player for the Boston Celtics, the first Portuguese player to be drafted and play in the NBA
