= Alhos Vedros =

- Civil parish
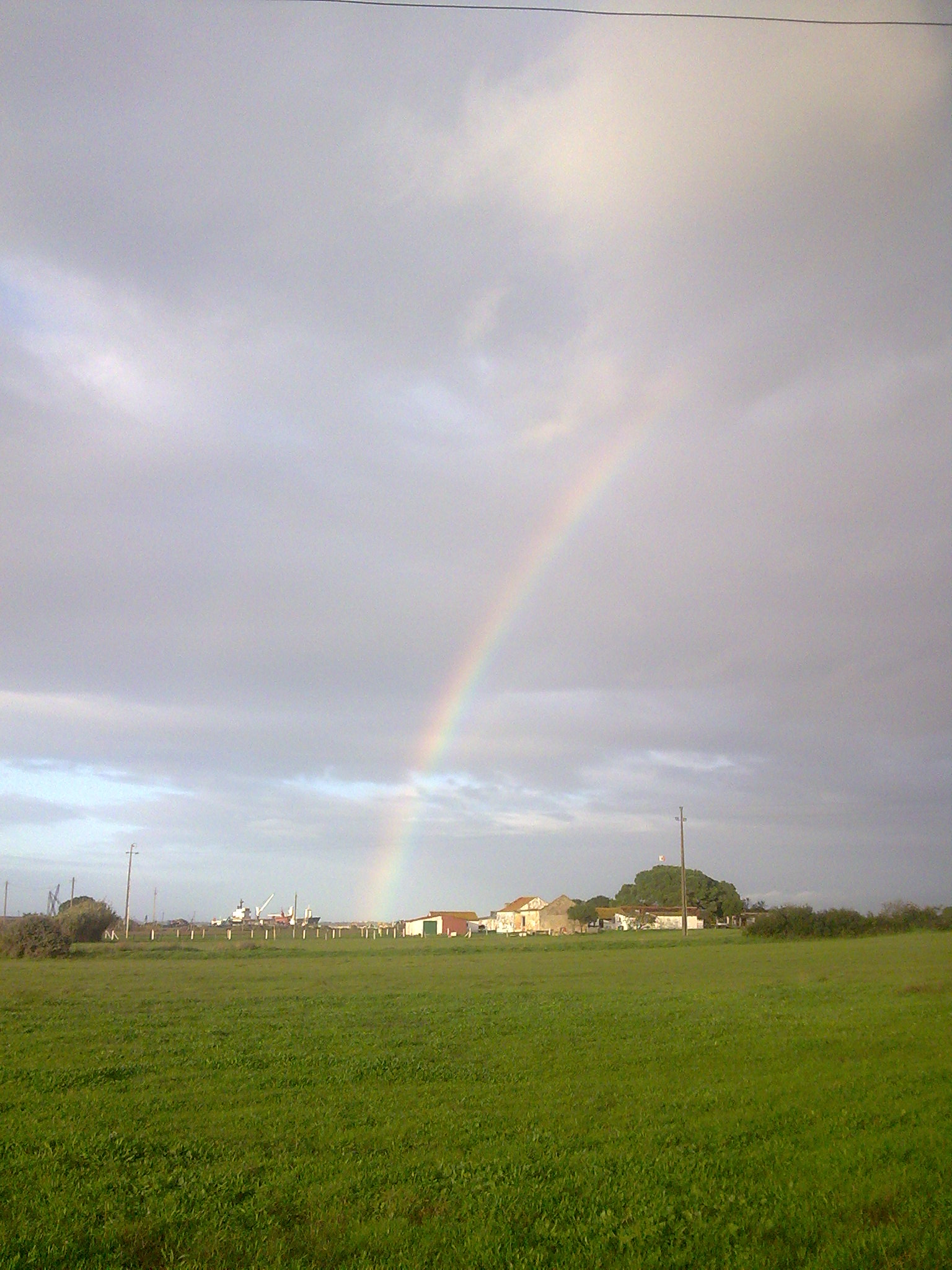
- Field and farmhouses in Alhos Vedros

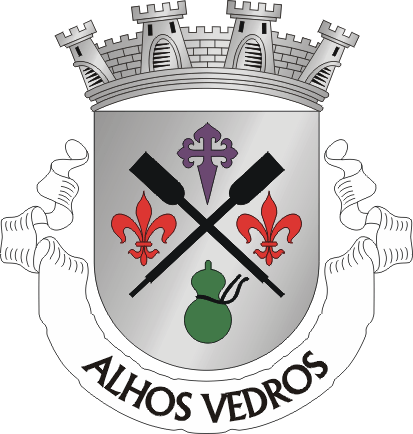
- Coat of arms

- Location in Portugal
- Coordinates: 38.653°N 9.023°W
- Country: Portugal
- Region: Lisbon
- Metropolitan area: Lisbon
- District: Setúbal
- Municipality: Moita

Area
  - Total: 17.91 km^{2} (6.92 sq mi)

Population (2011)
  - Total: 15,050
  - Density: 840.3/km^{2} (2,176/sq mi)
- Time zone: UTC+00:00 (WET)
  - Summer (DST): UTC+01:00 (WEST)

Alhos Vedros (pronounced [ˈaʎuʒ ˈvɛðɾuʃ]) is a town and a parish in the municipality of Moita, in Portugal. The population in 2011 was 15,050, in an area of 17.91 km^{2}.
