= 1987–88 S.L. Benfica season =

Benfica
1987–88 season
- President: João Santos
- Head coach: Ebbe Skovdahl (until 28 November 1987); Toni
- Stadium: Estádio da Luz
- Primeira Divisão: 2nd
- Taça de Portugal: Semi-finals
- European Cup: Runners-up
- Supertaça Cândido de Oliveira: Runners-up
- Top goalscorer: League: Rui Águas (12); All: Rui Águas (18)
Home colours

The 1987–88 season was Sport Lisboa e Benfica's 84th season in existence and the club's 54th consecutive season in the top flight of Portuguese football, covering the period from 1 July 1987 to 30 June 1988. Benfica competed domestically in the Primeira Divisão, Taça de Portugal and the Supertaça Cândido de Oliveira, and participated in the European Cup after winning the previous league.

Despite a league and cup double, John Mortimore was replaced with Ebbe Skovdahl, who failed to meet expectations, being sacked before the end of November. With the league out of reach, Benfica focused on their European campaign, now with Toni at the helm. Eliminating Partizani Tirana, Aarhus, Anderlecht and Steaua București, Benfica met PSV Eindhoven in the European Cup final. Without a key player like Diamantino, Benfica employed a cautious tactic, with the final being decided on the penalty-spot, where they lost, after van Breukelen defended a shot from Veloso. Domestically, Benfica came second behind Porto, and was knocked-out of the Portuguese Cup by the same team.

== Season summary ==
Benfica entered the new season with a change in the presidency and a new manager. Even before John Mortimore led the team to a league and cup double, there were discussion in the media of him being replaced by Sven-Göran Eriksson. A day after the victory in the 1987 Taça de Portugal final, Benfica confirmed that Mortimore was leaving. To fit in new President João Santos electoral strategy, for a "European Benfica", several names were discussed, such as Carlos Alberto Parreira, Telê Santana and Javier Clemente. Benfica approached Clemente, but insisted more on Gunder Bengtsson, who had just won the UEFA Cup. After Bengtsson declined the offer, Benfica turned to Ebbe Skovdahl, 42-year old Danish manager, who last managed Brøndby. In the transfer market, Benfica added several players, most notably, Elzo Coelho, Fernando Chalana, Carlos Mozer and Mats Magnusson. Departures included António Bastos Lopes, Minervino Pietra, José Luís and Michael Manniche, the first two to retirement. The pre-season started on 21 July with medical exams, followed by a trip to Switzerland the next day, where the team would play in the Philips Tournament. The location was also chosen so that they could do altitude training. Afterwards they played in the Teresa Herrera Trophy and Trofeo Colombino. Their presentation game was on 3 August with Vitória de Setúbal. Due to the events of 31 May in Braga, Benfica's first home game was played in Estádio Nacional.

Skovadahl stint at Benfica was a short-lived. Losses against Setúbal, Marítimo and Desportivo de Chaves led to immense pressure from the fans and four months into the season, on 28 November, he was sacked. He left the team 12 rounds into the season already trailing leader Porto by five points. His assistant Toni accepted the invitation to lead the team, in his first experience as manager. In his first game, he lost three-nil at home to Sporting for the Supertaça Cândido de Oliveira.

With little chance of renewing the league title, Benfica focused on their European campaign. In the first round, a 4-0 win against the violent Partizani Tirana saw UEFA expel the Albanians and void the second leg. Afterwards, they knocked-out Aarhus and Anderlecht, reaching the semi-finals with Steaua București, the winners of the 1985–86 European Cup. For the game with Steaua, Toni travelled to Glasgow and asked Graeme Souness for the videotapes of Rangers's games with them. He concluded the threat was Gheorghe Hagi and he needed to be annulled, a task that fell to Shéu, which he perform without mistakes. In the second leg, Rui Águas scored twice to put Benfica into their first European Cup final since 1968. The three-year project of a "European Benfica" produced his first result in his first season.

"Steaua gave me hope. Águas was amazing, and so was Diamantino. But he had that last minute misfortune [Diamantino's injury]...So he had to play in Stuttgart with Mauser rifles against an opponent equipped with laser guns. So to counter that, Benfica set up traps in a Portuguese way and passed unscathed through the game, even managing to overcome the deficit in potential and power between us until the end. What we did made me proud and with clear conscience. PSV ended up winning on the lottery"

— Toni on his tactic for the final

Before the final against PSV Eindhoven, Benfica lost Diamantino, a key player in the team that got severely injured and missed the final. In the final, Benfica also saw Rui Águas leave the pitch in the second half due to injury, forcing Toni to use Wando as forward. Another problem was the brand new socks that the team wore that caused the boots to slide out, with significant problems in traction for the players. The game was described as with the two teams playing cautiously, ending in 0–0, and requiring penalties to decide the winner. After the first set of penalties with all players scoring, the first of the second round of penalties fell to captain Veloso, who saw his shot defended by van Breukelen, awarding the cup to the Dutch team. Breukelen explained that he had a little book where he kept score of the direction the players shot their penalties. Veloso was there with a penalty shot to the right in a tournament in Spain.

A few days later, Benfica closed the season with one-nil loss to Porto in the semi-final of the Taça Portugal. In the league, Benfica ended 15 points behind them in second place.

== Competitions ==
Win Draw Loss Postponed

=== Overall record ===
Competition	First match	Last match	Record								
Competition	First match	Last match	G	W	D	L	GF	GA	GD	Win %	Source
Primeira Divisão	23 August 1987	5 June 1988	38	19	13	6	59	25	+34	50.00	
Taça de Portugal	22 November 1987	10 June 1988	7	5	1	1	13	4	+9	71.43	
European Cup	16 September 1987	25 May 1988	8	4	3	1	9	1	+8	50.00	
Supertaça Cândido de Oliveira	6 December 1987	20 December 1987	2	0	0	2	0	4	−4	0.00	
Total			55	28	17	10	81	34	+47	50.91	

=== Supertaça Cândido de Oliveira ===
6 December 1987 First leg	Benfica	0–3	Sporting	Lisbon
20:00		Report	Edmundo 20' (o.g.); Silvinho 72'; Paulinho Cascavel 78'	Stadium: Estádio da Luz; Attendance: 70,000; Referee: Sepa Santos

20 December 1987 Second leg	Sporting	1–0	Benfica	Lisbon
19:00	Silvinho 20'	Report		Stadium: Estádio de Alvalade; Attendance: 60,000; Referee: Fernando Alberto

=== Primeira Divisão ===
==== League table ====
Pos	Team	Pld	W	D	L	GF	GA	GD	Pts	Qualification or relegation
1	Porto (C)	38	29	8	1	88	15	+73	66	Qualification to European Cup first round
2	Benfica	38	19	13	6	59	25	+34	51	Qualification to UEFA Cup first round
3	Belenenses	38	18	12	8	52	38	+14	48	Qualification to UEFA Cup first round
4	Sporting CP	38	17	13	8	62	41	+21	47	Qualification to UEFA Cup first round
5	Boavista	38	16	14	8	42	25	+17	46	Qualification to UEFA Cup first round

Source: RSSSF
(C) Champions

==== Results by round ====
Round	1	2	3	4	5	6	7	8	9	10	11	12	13	14	15	16	17	18	19	20	21	22	23	24	25	26	27	28	29	30	31	32	33	34	35	36	37	38
Ground	A	H	A	H	A	H	A	H	A	H	A	H	A	H	H	A	H	A	H	H	A	H	A	H	A	H	A	H	A	H	A	H	A	A	H	A	H	A
Result	W	L	W	L	D	W	L	W	W	W	W	D	W	D	W	W	W	D	D	W	W	W	D	W	D	D	D	W	W	W	L	D	D	L	W	D	D	L
Position	3	6	4	9	10	8	10	8	5	2	2	2	2	2	2	2	2	2	2	2	2	2	2	2	2	2	2	2	2	2	2	2	2	2	2	2	2	2

Source: ForaDeJogo
A = Away; H = Home; W = Win; D = Draw; L = Loss

==== Matches ====
23 August 1987 1	Sporting da Covilhã	0–3	Benfica	Covilhã
19:00		Report	Diamantino 46', 75'; Rui Águas 87'	Stadium: Estádio Municipal José Santos Pinto; Attendance: 10,000; Referee: Francisco Silva

30 August 1987 2	Benfica	0–1	Vitória de Setúbal	Oeiras
19:45		Report	Aparício 2'	Stadium: Estádio Nacional; Attendance: 40,000; Referee: Veiga Trigo

6 September 1987 3	Portimonense	1–2	Benfica	Portimão
19:00	Forbs 50'	Report	Rui Águas 59', 79' (pen.)	Stadium: Estádio Municipal de Portimão; Attendance: 18,000; Referee: Rosa Santos

12 September 1987 4	Benfica	0–1	Marítimo	Lisbon
19:00		Report	Paulo Ricardo 59'	Stadium: Estádio da Luz; Attendance: 40,000; Referee: Fortunato Azevedo

26 September 1987 5	Sporting	1–1	Benfica	Lisbon
21:00	Tony Sealy 29'	Report	Tueba 66'	Stadium: Estádio de Alvalade; Attendance: 60,000; Referee: Carlos Valente

4 October 1987 6	Benfica	1–0	O Elvas	Lisbon
19:45	Rui Águas 69'	Report		Stadium: Estádio da Luz; Attendance: 20,000; Referee: Bento Marques

11 October 1987 7	Desportivo de Chaves	1–0	Benfica	Chaves
19:00	Júlio Sérgio 89' (pen.)	Report		Stadium: Estádio Municipal de Chaves; Attendance: 20,000; Referee: José Guedes

17 October 1987 8	Benfica	2–0	Salgueiros	Lisbon
19:30	Magnusson 29'; Álvaro 65'	Report		Stadium: Estádio da Luz; Attendance: 50,000; Referee: Ezequiel Feijão

25 October 1987 9	Penafiel	0–1	Benfica	Penafiel
19:00		Report	Wando 27'	Stadium: Estádio Municipal 25 de Abril; Attendance: 25,000; Referee: Francisco Silva

31 October 1987 10	Benfica	2–0	Rio Ave	Lisbon
19:45	Carlos Manuel 53'; Magnusson 90'	Report		Stadium: Estádio da Luz; Attendance: 20,000; Referee: Azevedo Duarte

15 November 1987 11	Espinho	0–1	Benfica	Espinho
19:00		Report	Magnusson 44'	Stadium: Estádio Comendador Manuel Violas; Attendance: 20,000; Referee: Alder Dante

27 November 1987 12	Benfica	2–2	Farense	Lisbon
19:00	Mozer 73'; Chiquinho Carlos 78'	Report	Formosinho 45'; Vitinha 88'	Stadium: Estádio da Luz; Attendance: 20,000; Referee: Teixeira Dória

13 December 1987 13	Académica	2–4	Benfica	Coimbra
19:00	Quinito 36' (pen.), 44'	Report	Magnusson 13', 17', 21'; Mozer 71'	Stadium: Estádio Municipal de Coimbra; Attendance: 10,000; Referee: Carlos Valente

27 December 1987 14	Benfica	0–0	Braga	Lisbon
19:00		Report		Stadium: Estádio da Luz; Attendance: 35,000; Referee: Joaquim Gonçalves

3 January 1988 15	Benfica	2–0	Belenenses	Lisbon
19:00	Magnusson 70'; Diamantino 90'	Report		Stadium: Estádio da Luz; Attendance: 45,000; Referee: Vítor Correia

10 January 1988 16	Vitória de Guimarães	0–2	Benfica	Guimarães
19:00		Report	Diamantino 8'; Pacheco 45'	Stadium: Estádio D. Afonso Henriques; Attendance: 35,000; Referee: Francisco Silva

17 January 1988 17	Benfica	2–0	Boavista	Lisbon
19:45	Rui Águas 26'; Pacheco 79'	Report		Stadium: Estádio da Luz; Attendance: 40,000; Referee: Fortunato Azevedo

24 January 1988 18	Varzim	0–0	Benfica	Póvoa de Varzim
19:00		Report		Stadium: Estádio do Varzim SC; Attendance: 12,000; Referee: Rosa Santos

31 January 1988 19	Benfica	1–1	Porto	Lisbon
20:00	Diamantino 49'	Report	Jaime Magalhães 18'	Stadium: Estádio da Luz; Attendance: 125,000; Referee: Rosa Santos

6 February 1988 20	Benfica	4–0	Sporting da Covilhã	Lisbon
19:30	Magnusson 28', 66'; Rui Águas 33', 63'	Report		Stadium: Estádio da Luz; Attendance: 30,000; Referee: Xavier de Oliveira

13 February 1988 21	Vitória de Setúbal	0–2	Benfica	Setúbal
20:30		Report	Rui Águas 9'; Álvaro 89'	Stadium: Estádio do Bonfim; Attendance: 35,000; Referee: Fernando Alberto

20 February 1988 22	Benfica	3–1	Portimonense	Lisbon
20:00	Mozer 17'; Chiquinho Carlos 49'; Elzo 89'	Report	César Brito 44'	Stadium: Estádio da Luz; Attendance: 35,000; Referee: Alder Dante

27 February 1988 23	Marítimo	1–1	Benfica	Funchal
19:00	Teixeirinha 21'	Report	Chiquinho Carlos 64'	Stadium: Estádio dos Barreiros; Attendance: 30,000; Referee: Miranda Dias

6 March 1988 24	Benfica	4–1	Sporting	Lisbon
20:00	Magnusson 12', 15'; Rui Águas 30', 58'	Report	Paulinho Cascavel 3'	Stadium: Estádio da Luz; Attendance: 80,000; Referee: Vítor Correia

12 March 1988 25	O Elvas	0–0	Benfica	Elvas
19:00		Report		Stadium: Campo Domingos Carrilho Patalino; Attendance: 15,000; Referee: José Guedes

20 March 1988 26	Benfica	1–1	Desportivo de Chaves	Lisbon
20:00	Chalana 16'	Report	Radi 81'	Stadium: Estádio da Luz; Attendance: 50,000; Referee: Rosa Santos

26 March 1988 27	Salgueiros	0–0	Benfica	Porto
19:00		Report		Stadium: Estádio Engenheiro Vidal Pinheiro; Attendance: 8,000; Referee: Francisco Silva

2 April 1988 28	Benfica	4–0	Penafiel	Lisbon
17:45	Mozer 6'; Chiquinho Carlos 78'; Diamantino 80'; Rui Águas 85'	Report		Stadium: Estádio da Luz; Attendance: 25,000; Referee: José Garcia

10 April 1988 29	Rio Ave	0–1	Benfica	Vila do Conde
19:00		Report	Chalana 31'	Stadium: Estádio dos Arcos; Attendance: 12,000; Referee: Fortunato Azevedo

16 April 1988 30	Benfica	5–1	Espinho	Lisbon
20:00	Chiquinho Carlos 4'; Mozer 35', 84' (pen.); Tó Portela 86'; Wando 89'	Report	Marcos António (red card) 38'; Ivan 43'; Nelo (yellow card) 47' (yellow-red card) 90'	Stadium: Estádio da Luz; Attendance: 30,000; Referee: Bento Marques

24 April 1988 31	Farense	1–0	Benfica	Faro
19:15	Ademar 14'	Report		Stadium: Estádio de São Luís; Attendance: 15,000; Referee: Ezequiel Feijão

30 April 1988 32	Benfica	1–1	Académica	Lisbon
19:45	Wando 75'	Report	Pedro Rocha 93'	Stadium: Estádio da Luz; Attendance: 30,000; Referee: Rosa Santos

7 May 1988 33	Braga	0–0	Benfica	Braga
19:00		Report		Stadium: Estádio 1º de Maio; Attendance: 12,000; Referee: Carlos Valente

15 May 1988 34	Belenenses	2–1	Benfica	Lisbon
19:30	Chiquinho Conde 15'; Chico Faria 21'	Report	Augusto 10'	Stadium: Estádio do Restelo; Attendance: 25,000; Referee: Rosa Santos

21 May 1988 35	Benfica	3–0	Vitória de Guimarães	Lisbon
19:30	Rui Águas 10'; Magnusson 42', 68'	Report		Stadium: Estádio da Luz; Attendance: 35,000; Referee: Miranda Dias

29 May 1988 36	Boavista	1–1	Benfica	Porto
20:00	Chiquinho Carioca 66'	Report	Tó Portela 80'	Stadium: Estádio do Bessa; Attendance: 18,000; Referee: Carlos Valente

2 June 1988 37	Benfica	2–2	Varzim	Oeiras
19:30	Pacheco 84' (pen.), 86'	Report	Vata 7', 14'	Stadium: Estádio Nacional; Attendance: 40,000; Referee: Azevedo Duarte

5 June 1988 38	Porto	3–0	Benfica	Porto
20:30	Jaime Pacheco 52', 80' (pen.); Rui Barros 87'	Report		Stadium: Estádio das Antas; Attendance: 80,000; Referee: Miranda Dias

=== Taça de Portugal ===
22 November 1987 Third Rd	Paços de Ferreira	1–4	Benfica	Paços de Ferreira
19:00	Marco 62'	Report	Rui Águas 25', 54'; Magnusson 49'; Mozer 53'	Stadium: Estádio da Mata Real; Attendance: 10,000; Referee: Miranda Dias

16 February 1988 Fourth Rd	Desportivo das Aves	0–2	Benfica	Aves
19:00		Report	Chiquinho Carlos 5'; Magnusson 16'	Stadium: Estádio do CD Aves; Attendance: 10,000; Referee: Miranda Dias

9 March 1988 Fifth Rd	Benfica	1–0 (a.e.t.)	Estrela Portalegre	Lisbon
18:30	Tó Portela 115'	Report		Stadium: Estádio da Luz; Attendance: 30,000; Referee: Bento Marques

27 April 1988 Round of 16	Salgueiros	1–1 (a.e.t.)	Benfica	Porto
19:00	Santos Cardoso 34'	Report	Pacheco 88'	Stadium: Estádio Engenheiro Vidal Pinheiro; Attendance: 8,000; Referee: Fortunato Azevedo

3 May 1988 R16 Replay	Benfica	4–1	Salgueiros	Lisbon
19:30	Chalana 45' (pen.), 60'; Tó Portela 46'; Diamantino 75'	Report	Santos Cardoso 28'	Stadium: Estádio da Luz; Attendance: 30,000; Referee: Francisco Caroço

10 May 1988 Quarter-final	Benfica	1–0	Fafe	Lisbon
19:30	Pacheco 78'	Report		Stadium: Estádio da Luz; Attendance: 30,000; Referee: Raúl Ribeiro

10 June 1988 Semi-final	Porto	1–0	Benfica	Porto
19:30	Rui Barros 86'	Report	Veloso (red card) 85'	Stadium: Estádio das Antas; Attendance: 60,000; Referee: Rosa Santos

=== European Cup ===
==== First round ====
16 September 1987 First leg	Benfica (Portugal)	4–0	(Albania) Partizani Tirana	Lisbon
19:45	Hametaj 37' (o.g.); Mozer 81'; Rui Águas 86', 90'	Report		Stadium: Estádio da Luz; Attendance: 40,000; Referee: José Donato Pes Pérez

30 September 1987 Second leg	Partizani Tirana (Albania)	Void (0–4 agg.)	(Portugal) Benfica	Tirana
		Report		Stadium: Qemal Stafa Stadium

==== Second round ====
21 October 1987 First leg	AGF (Denmark)	0–0	(Portugal) Benfica	Aarhus
19:45		Report		Stadium: Atletion; Referee: Eero Aho

4 November 1987 Second leg	Benfica (Portugal)	1–0 (1–0 agg.)	(Denmark) AGF	Lisbon
19:45	Nunes 38'	Report		Stadium: Estádio da Luz; Attendance: 50,000; Referee: Philippe Mercier

==== Quarter-final ====
2 March 1988 First leg	Benfica (Portugal)	2–0	(Belgium) Anderlecht	Lisbon
19:45	Magnusson 15'; Chiquinho 18'	Report		Stadium: Estádio da Luz; Attendance: 90,000; Referee: Dušan Krchňák

16 March 1988 Second leg	Anderlecht (Belgium)	1–0 (1–2 agg.)	(Portugal) Benfica	Brussels
19:45	Guðjohnsen 63'	Report		Stadium: Constant Vanden Stock Stadium; Attendance: 30,000; Referee: Keith Hackett

==== Semi-final ====
6 April 1988 First leg	Steaua București (Romania)	0–0	(Portugal) Benfica	Bucharest
19:45		Report		Stadium: Stadionul Steaua; Attendance: 30,000; Referee: Karl-Heinz Tritschler

20 April 1988 Second leg	Benfica (Portugal)	2–0 (2–0 agg.)	(Romania) Steaua București	Lisbon
19:45	Rui Águas 22', 32'	Report		Stadium: Estádio da Luz; Attendance: 120,000; Referee: Michel Vautrot

===== Final =====
25 May 1988	PSV Eindhoven (Netherlands)	0–0 (a.e.t.) (6–5 p)	(Portugal) Benfica	Stuttgart
21:15		Report		Stadium: Neckarstadion; Attendance: 64,000; Referee: Helmut Kohl
	Penalties
	Koeman (penalty scored); Kieft (penalty scored); Nielsen (penalty scored); Vanenburg (penalty scored); Lerby (penalty scored); Janssen (penalty scored)		(penalty scored) Elzo; (penalty scored) Dito; (penalty scored) Hajry; (penalty scored) Pacheco; (penalty scored) Mozer; (penalty missed) Veloso

=== Friendlies ===
26 July 1987	Grasshopper	1–5	Benfica	Zürich
	Martin Andermatt 30'		Carlos Manuel 2', 21'; Diamantino 19'; Rui Águas 24', 80'	Stadium: Letzigrund

29 July 1987 Philips TM	Grêmio	2–1	Benfica	Bern
	Lima 21', 47'		Carlos Manuel 55'	Stadium: Wankdorf Stadium

31 July 1987 Philips TM	Young Boys	2–2 (3–1 p)	Benfica	Bern
	Hans Holmqvist 18'; Martin Jeitziner 87'		Mozer 29'; Rui Águas 37'	Stadium: Wankdorf Stadium
	Penalties
			(penalty scored) Elzo; (penalty missed) Carlos Manuel; (penalty missed) Diamantino; (penalty missed) Rui Águas

4 August 1987	Benfica	1–1	Vitória de Setúbal	Lisbon
	Rui Águas 4'		Lázár Szentes 53'	Stadium: Estádio da Luz; Referee: Sepa Santos

8 August 1987 Teresa Herrera	Benfica	0–0 (5–3 p)	Everton	A Coruña
				Stadium: Estadio Riazor
	Penalties
	Elzo (penalty scored); Rui Águas (penalty scored); Nunes (penalty scored); Dito (penalty scored); Diamantino (penalty scored)

9 August 1987 Teresa Herrera	Deportivo La Coruña	1–1 (3–4 p)	Benfica	A Coruña
	Aspiazu 27'		Rui Águas 76'	Stadium: Estadio Riazor
	Penalties
			(penalty missed) Chiquinho Carlos; (penalty scored) Rui Águas; (penalty missed) Veloso; (penalty scored) Nunes; (penalty scored) Bento; (penalty scored) Edmundo

12 August 1987	Vitória de Setúbal	1–2	Benfica	Setúbal
	Hernâni		Zezinho (o.g.); Rui Águas	Stadium: Estádio do Bonfim; Attendance: 10,000; Referee: Ezequiel Feijão

13 August 1987 Taça de Honra	Benfica (Note: This competition was played with a mixed of squad players from the first team and others from youth)	1–0	Sporting	Lisbon
	Tó Portela			Stadium: Estádio da Luz

15 August 1987 Colombino	Espanyol	1–2	Benfica	Huelva
	Pichi Alonso 58'		Nunes 22'; Diamantino 88'	Stadium: Estadio Colombino

16 August 1987 Taça de Honra	Benfica	2–0	Oriental de Lisboa	Lisbon
				Stadium: Estádio da Luz

16 August 1987 Colombino	Recreativo	2–1	Benfica	Huelva
	Márquez 1'; Luzardo 71' (pen.)		Rui Águas 44'	Stadium: Estadio Colombino

3 September 1987	Alverca	1–0	Benfica	Alverca
	Paulo Rato 30'			Stadium: Complexo Desportivo FC Alverca

1 December 1987	Al-Ahli Saudi	0–4	Benfica	Jeddah
			Rui Águas; Chiquinho Carlos; Tueba Menayane; Mats Magnusson

9 February 1988	AJ Auxerre	2–1	Benfica	Dijon
	Rui Águas 36' (o.g.); Vahirua 40'		Rui Águas 89' (pen.)	Stadium: Stade Gaston Gérard

== Player statistics ==
The squad for the season consisted of the players listed in the tables below, as well as staff member Ebbe Skovdahl (manager), Toni (manager), Jesualdo Ferreira (assistant manager), Eusébio (assistant manager), Gaspar Ramos (Director of Football), Vieira da Fonseca (Doctor), Amílcar Miranda (Doctor).

Note 1: Note: Flags indicate national team as defined under FIFA eligibility rules. Players may hold more than one non-FIFA nationality.

Note 2: Players with squad numbers marked ‡ joined the club during the 1987-88 season via transfer, with more details in the following section.

No.	Pos	Nat	Player	Total		Primeira Divisão		Taça de Portugal		European Cup		Supertaça	
No.	Pos	Nat	Player	Apps	Goals	Apps	Goals	Apps	Goals	Apps	Goals	Apps	Goals
1	GK	(Portugal) POR	Manuel Bento	2	0	1	0	0	0	0	0	1	0
1	GK	(Portugal) POR	Silvino	53	0	38	0	6	0	8	0	1	0
2	DF	(Portugal) POR	António Veloso	34	0	21	0	5	0	8	0	0	0
3^{‡}	DF	(Brazil) BRA	Carlos Mozer	43	8	30	6	4	1	8	1	1	0
3	DF	(Portugal) POR	Dito	41	0	28	0	6	0	7	0	0	0
3	DF	(Portugal) POR	Álvaro Magalhães	43	2	30	2	5	0	7	0	1	0
3^{‡}	DF	(Portugal) POR	António Fonseca	7	0	4	0	2	0	1	0	0	0
4	DF	(Portugal) POR	Samuel Quina	9	0	7	0	2	0	0	0	0	0
4	DF	(Portugal) POR	Edmundo	21	0	15	0	2	0	2	0	2	0
5^{‡}	DF	(Portugal) POR	Carlos Pereira	24	0	20	0	1	0	1	0	2	0
5^{‡}	DF	(Portugal) POR	Nuno Damas	3	0	3	0	0	0	0	0	0	0
5	DF	(Portugal) POR	Paulo Guilherme	1	0	1	0	0	0	0	0	0	0
6^{‡}	MF	(Brazil) BRA	Elzo Coelho	31	1	22	1	3	0	4	0	2	0
6	MF	(Portugal) POR	Carlos Manuel	12	1	8	1	1	0	2	0	1	0
7	MF	(Zaire) ZAI	Tueba Menayane	24	1	16	1	2	0	4	0	2	0
7	MF	(Brazil) BRA	Chiquinho Carlos	42	8	28	6	6	1	6	1	2	0
7	MF	(Brazil) BRA	Wando	39	3	25	3	7	0	5	0	2	0
8	MF	(Portugal) POR	Adelino Nunes	24	1	17	0	1	0	4	1	2	0
8^{‡}	MF	(Portugal) POR	António Pacheco	37	6	25	4	5	2	6	0	1	0
8	MF	(Morocco) MAR	Hajry Redouane	9	0	4	0	3	0	2	0	0	0
9	FW	(Portugal) POR	Rui Águas	38	18	25	12	3	2	8	4	2	0
9^{‡}	FW	(Portugal) POR	Paulo Padinha	6	0	4	0	2	0	0	0	0	0
9	FW	(Brazil) BRA	Marlos Antunes	1	0	1	0	0	0	0	0	0	0
9^{‡}	FW	(Portugal) POR	Tó Portela	12	4	8	2	4	2	0	0	0	0
10	MF	(Portugal) POR	Luís Mariano	2	0	2	0	0	0	0	0	0	0
11^{‡}	MF	(Portugal) POR	Augusto Jerónimo	15	1	13	1	2	0	0	0	0	0
10^{‡}	MF	(Portugal) POR	Fernando Chalana	17	4	10	2	3	2	3	0	1	0
11^{‡}	FW	(Sweden) SWE	Mats Magnusson	38	16	28	13	3	2	5	1	2	0
11	MF	(Portugal) POR	Diamantino Miranda	36	7	25	6	5	1	6	0	0	0
11	MF	(Portugal) POR	Shéu	36	0	25	0	5	0	5	0	1	0

== Transfers ==
=== In ===
Entry date	Position	Player	From club	Fee	Ref
3 April 1987	MF	Elzo Coelho	Atlético Mineiro	Undisclosed	
27 May 1987	MF	Fernando Chalana	Bordeaux	Undisclosed	
22 June 1987	GK	António Dias Graça	Gil Vicente	Undisclosed	
22 June 1987	GK	Delgado	Farense	Loan return	
27 June 1987	MF	António Pacheco	Portimonense	Undisclosed	
27 June 1987	MF	Augusto Jerónimo	Portimonense	Undisclosed	
2 July 1987	DF	Carlos Mozer	Flamengo	Undisclosed	
6 July 1987	MF	Hajry Redouane	Raja Casablanca	Undisclosed	
21 July 1987	DF	Carlos Pereira	Farense	Loan return	
21 July 1987	DF	António Fonseca	Tirsense	Undisclosed	
21 July 1987	DF	Nuno Damas	Torreense	Undisclosed	
21 July 1987	MF	Vítor Paneira	Famalicão	Undisclosed	
21 July 1987	MF	Paulo Padinha	Portimonense	Undisclosed	
14 August 1987	FW	Tó Portela	Tirsense	Undisclosed	
1 September 1987	FW	Mats Magnusson	Malmö	Undisclosed	

=== Out ===
Exit date	Position	Player	To club	Fee	Ref
4 June 1987	DF	António Oliveira	Marítimo	Free	
22 June 1987	DF	António Bastos Lopes	None	Retired	
22 June 1987	DF	Minervino Pietra	None	Retired	
27 June 1987	MF	José Luís	Marítimo	Free	
21 July 1987	GK	Neno	Vitória de Setúbal	Undisclosed	
21 July 1987	FW	Michael Manniche	B1903	Undisclosed	
22 August 1987	FW	Zvonko Živkovic	Fortuna Düsseldorf	Undisclosed	
16 December 1987	MF	Carlos Manuel	Sion	Undisclosed	

=== Out by loan ===
Exit date	Position	Player	To club	Return date	Ref
27 June 1987	FW	César Brito	Portimonense	30 June 1988	
30 June 1987	DF	José Carlos	Portimonense	30 June 1988	
21 July 1987	MF	Vítor Paneira	Vizela	30 June 1988	
22 August 1987	MF	Rui Pedro	Vitória Setúbal	30 June 1988	
