= János Hrotkó =

Hungarian footballer and manager

Personal information
- Full name: János Szalai Hrotkó
- Date of birth: March 30, 1922
- Place of birth: Gérce, Hungary
- Date of death: March 23, 2005 (aged 82)
- Place of death: Évora, Portugal
- Position: Forward

Senior career*
Years	Team	Apps	(Gls)
1945–1946	MTK Hungária	40	(3)
1947–1949	Bari	70	(6)
1949–1950	Pro Sesto	22	(3)
1950–1952	Real Zaragoza	33	(14)
1953–1955	Sporting		
1955–1956	Covilhã	23	(7)

Managerial career
- 1963: Atlético Clube de Portugal
- 1963: Lusitano G.C.
- 1964: S.C.U. Torreense
- 1966–1967: C.S. Marítimo
- 1972: Leixões S.C.
- 1974–1975: C.D. Torres Novas
- 1975–1976: Leixões S.C.
- 1976–1977: S.C. Olhanense
- 1978–1979: S.C. Olhanense
- * Club domestic league appearances and goals

János Hrotkó (30 March 1922 – 23 March 2005) was a Hungarian football player and manager.

== Career ==
Born in Gérce, Hrotkó began playing football with MTK Hungária.

Hrotkó signed with Serie A side Bari in 1946, and spent three seasons with the club before leaving for Serie B side Pro Sesto. He next moved to Spain where he would play two seasons for Real Zaragoza.

Hrotkó finished his playing career in Portugal, playing in the Portuguese Liga with Sporting Clube de Portugal and S.C. Covilhã.
