= Renato Marques =

Renato Marques may refer to:

- Renato Marques (Brazilian footballer) (born 2003), Brazilian football forward
- Renato Marques (Portuguese footballer) (born 1996), Portuguese football midfielder
