= W.A.K.O. World Championships (Villach) 2009 =

Kickboxing event in Austria

W.A.K.O. World Championships 2009 (Villach)
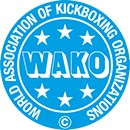
- The poster for W.A.K.O. World Championships 2009 (Villach)
- Promotion: W.A.K.O.
- Date: October 19 to October 25, 2009
- City: Villach, Austria

The WAKO World Championships 2009 was one of the major international kickboxing events organized by the World Association of Kickboxing Organizations (WAKO). The competition was held in Villach, Austria, from October 19 to October 25, 2009. It featured several kickboxing disciplines, including Light Contact, Low Kick and K-1 Rules.

== Disciplines ==
=== Light Contact ===
A technical fighting style where competitors score points through controlled and fast strikes, focusing on speed, precision, and technique rather than heavy impact.

=== Low Kick ===
A full-contact style that allows kicks to the legs (thighs) in addition to body and head strikes, emphasizing power, strategy, and endurance.

=== K-1 Rules ===
A more intense and popular format that includes punches, kicks, and knee strikes, allowing continuous action and limited clinching, widely used in professional kickboxing.

== Light Contact ==
=== Men ===
Event	Gold	Silver	Bronze
-57 kg	Aisin Maksim; Russia	Darren Chapman; Great Britain	Kacper Narloch; Poland
-57 kg	Aisin Maksim; Russia	Darren Chapman; Great Britain	Gegor Debeljak; Slovenia
-63 kg	Tony Stephenson; Ireland	Wojciech Niednielski; Poland	Kostyontyn Demoretskyy; Ukraine
-63 kg	Tony Stephenson; Ireland	Wojciech Niednielski; Poland	Magnus Hansen; Denmark
-69 kg	Simone Concu; Italy	Achmed Nabo; Germany	Paulo Zamyatin; Ukraine
-69 kg	Simone Concu; Italy	Achmed Nabo; Germany	Grega Rudolf; Slovenia
-74 kg	Laszlo Szabo; Hungary	Bertalan Levente; Austria	Zhukov Sergey; Russia
-74 kg	Laszlo Szabo; Hungary	Bertalan Levente; Austria	Christian Thomson; Great Britain
-79 kg	Zoltan Dancso; Hungary	Robert Matyja; Poland	Ales Zemljic; Slovenia
-79 kg	Zoltan Dancso; Hungary	Robert Matyja; Poland	Artem Naskov; Ukraine
-84 kg	Martsevitch Denis; Russia	Stephan Bücker; Germany	Bojan Kmiskovic; Croatia
-84 kg	Martsevitch Denis; Russia	Stephan Bücker; Germany	Mariusz Niziokek; Poland
-89 kg	Gabbasov Ildar; Russia	Gianluca Stitzer; Italy	Prosic Juso; Austria
-89 kg	Gabbasov Ildar; Russia	Gianluca Stitzer; Italy	Gavin Williamson; Great Britain
-94 kg	Boris Miskovic; Croatia	Dmitrienko Alexander; Russia	Igor Kravehuk; Ukraine
-94 kg	Boris Miskovic; Croatia	Dmitrienko Alexander; Russia	Gerdentisch Patrick; Austria
+94 kg	Edin Latic; Slovenia	Gritsch Rupert; Austria	Panyan Emin; Russia
+94 kg	Edin Latic; Slovenia	Gritsch Rupert; Austria	Michal Wszelak; Poland

=== Women ===
Event	Gold	Silver	Bronze
-50 kg	Valeria Calabrase; Italy	Valentina Filatova; Russia	Stasa Lubej; Slovenia
-50 kg	Valeria Calabrase; Italy	Valentina Filatova; Russia	Sinead Beasley; Ireland
-55 kg	Kateryna Solovey; Ukraine	Petra Zolnir; Slovenia	Maria Kushtanova; Russia
-55 kg	Kateryna Solovey; Ukraine	Petra Zolnir; Slovenia	Monika Molnar; Hungary
-60 kg	Julia Irmen; Germany	Vivien Wagner; Hungary	Valeria Iskhakova; Russia
-60 kg	Julia Irmen; Germany	Vivien Wagner; Hungary	Jennifer Czappek; Austria
-65 kg	Bojana Dancsecs; Hungary	Nicole Trimmel; Austria	Janina Geissbühler; Switzerland
-65 kg	Bojana Dancsecs; Hungary	Nicole Trimmel; Austria	Kamila Bakanda; Poland
-70 kg	Ana Znaor; Croatia	Marta Fenyvesi; Hungary	Karin Edenius; Sweden
-70 kg	Ana Znaor; Croatia	Marta Fenyvesi; Hungary	Anais Kistler; Switzerland
+70 kg	Maria Semenova; Russia	Beata Lesnik; Poland	Helena Jurisic; Croatia
+70 kg	Maria Semenova; Russia	Beata Lesnik; Poland	Sya Ukena; Germany

=== Light Contact Veterans ===
Event	Gold	Silver	Bronze
-63 kg	Keith Morris; Great Britain	Günther Parzer; Austria	
-69 kg	Piotr Siegooczynski; Poland	Ian Kingston; Ireland	Fabio Galvao; Brazil
-69 kg	Piotr Siegooczynski; Poland	Ian Kingston; Ireland	Ivan Draganic; Croatia
-74 kg	Sandro Müller; Switzerland	Zocmowski Lasler; Poland	Gareth McLaughlin; Ireland
-74 kg	Sandro Müller; Switzerland	Zocmowski Lasler; Poland	Nikola Matanovic; Bosnia and Herzegovina
-79 kg	Owen King; Great Britain	Xavi Moya Garcia; Spain	
-79 kg	Owen King; Great Britain	Xavi Moya Garcia; Spain	Josef Hajdinjak; Austria
-84 kg	Gerald Zimmermann; Austria	Helge Lohmann; Germany	
-89 kg	Frank Feuer; Germany	Lee Sansum; Great Britain	
-89 kg	Frank Feuer; Germany	Lee Sansum; Great Britain	Roman Sendor; Austria
-94 kg	Richard Phillips; Great Britain	Herbert Hainzinger; Germany	
+94 kg	Neil Bishop; Canada	Paul Coffey; Ireland	
+94 kg	Neil Bishop; Canada	Paul Coffey; Ireland	John Morley; Great Britain

== Low Kick ==
=== Men ===
Event	Gold	Silver	Bronze
-51 kg	Dmitry Ayzatulov; Russia	Ivan Sciolla; Italy	Srdjan Nadljanski; Serbia
-51 kg	Dmitry Ayzatulov; Russia	Ivan Sciolla; Italy	Artem Vztiegov; Ukraine
-54 kg	Yuriy Trogiiyanov; Russia	Fabrice Bauluck; Mauritius	Emil Kerimov; Azerbaijan
-54 kg	Yuriy Trogiiyanov; Russia	Fabrice Bauluck; Mauritius	Cedric Custos; France
-57 kg	Umar Pashaev; Russia	Boban Marinkovic; Serbia	Rolan Quliyev; Azerbaijan
-57 kg	Umar Pashaev; Russia	Boban Marinkovic; Serbia	Mirbek Suiumbaev; Kyrgyzstan
-60 kg	Eduard Mammadov; Azerbaijan	Milos Ani; Serbia	Ismail Inci; Turkey
-60 kg	Eduard Mammadov; Azerbaijan	Milos Ani; Serbia	Amilcar Fonseca; Brazil
-63.5 kg	Denis Lukashov; Russia	Fikri Arican; Turkey	Jari Erdozain; Spain
-63.5 kg	Denis Lukashov; Russia	Fikri Arican; Turkey	Mihajlo Jovanovic; Serbia
-67 kg	Shamil Abdulmedjidov; Russia	Youheni Tseltsa; Belarus	Petar Zivov; Serbia
-67 kg	Shamil Abdulmedjidov; Russia	Youheni Tseltsa; Belarus	Ezbir Abdella; France
-71 kg	Parviz Abdullaev; Azerbaijan	Vladimir Tarasov; Russia	Frane Radnic; Croatia
-71 kg	Parviz Abdullaev; Azerbaijan	Vladimir Tarasov; Russia	Bjorn Kjollerstrom; Sweden
-75 kg	Alpay Kir; Turkey	Karim Ghajji; France	Mekan Hojageldiyev; Turkmenistan
-75 kg	Alpay Kir; Turkey	Karim Ghajji; France	Kanan Sadikhov; Azerbaijan
-81 kg	Ehram Majidov; Azerbaijan	Tounkaraf Bakari; France	Veejay Agathe; Mauritius
-81 kg	Ehram Majidov; Azerbaijan	Tounkaraf Bakari; France	Lumilampi Miika; Finland
-86 kg	Alan Katsoev; Russia	Michal Hromek; Slovakia	Mehmet Özer; Turkey
-86 kg	Alan Katsoev; Russia	Michal Hromek; Slovakia	Toni Milanović; Croatia
-91 kg	Dmitry Anonenko; Russia	Yanken Ankalieviek; Belarus	Marchado Amiel; Brazil
-91 kg	Dmitry Anonenko; Russia	Yanken Ankalieviek; Belarus	İhsan Yıldırım Tarhan; Turkey
+91 kg	Goran Radonjić; Montenegro	Dragan Jovanović; Serbia	Iuril Gorbenko; Ukraine
+91 kg	Goran Radonjić; Montenegro	Dragan Jovanović; Serbia	Noel Cadet; France

=== Women ===
Event	Gold	Silver	Bronze
-48 kg	Svetlana Ananyeva; Russia	Nathalie Maurel; France	Valentina Cabras; Italy
-48 kg	Svetlana Ananyeva; Russia	Nathalie Maurel; France	Bianca Araujo; Brazil
-52 kg	Zeljana Pitesa; Croatia	Therese Gunnarsson; Sweden	Nadia Khayenko; Ukraine
-52 kg	Zeljana Pitesa; Croatia	Therese Gunnarsson; Sweden	Kseniya Kokorina; Russia
-56 kg	Eva Liskova; Czech Republic	Doris Köhler; Austria	Alicja Piecyk; Poland
-56 kg	Eva Liskova; Czech Republic	Doris Köhler; Austria	Eva Ma Naranjo; Spain
-60 kg	Fatima Bokova; Russia	Barbara Plazzoli; Italy	Lemos Kabor; Brazil
-60 kg	Fatima Bokova; Russia	Barbara Plazzoli; Italy	Kinga Sina; Poland
-65 kg	Elena Kondratyeva; Russia	Mimma Mandolini; Italy	Jelena Stefanovic; Serbia
-65 kg	Elena Kondratyeva; Russia	Mimma Mandolini; Italy	Page Lelo; France
-70 kg	Nives Radic; Croatia	Mariya Basulina; Ukraine	Svetlana Kulakova; Russia
-70 kg	Nives Radic; Croatia	Mariya Basulina; Ukraine	Atmani Saida; France
+70 kg	Paulina Biec; Poland	Natalija Simac; Croatia	
+70 kg	Paulina Biec; Poland	Natalija Simac; Croatia	Daria Gurieva; Russia

== K1 Rules ==
=== Men ===
Event	Gold	Silver	Bronze
-51 kg	Giampiero Marceddu; Italy	Siarhei Skiba; Belarus	Tolga Arslan; Turkey
-51 kg	Giampiero Marceddu; Italy	Siarhei Skiba; Belarus	Ayrat Kamaev; Russia
-54 kg	Murat Azerhiev; Belarus	Michael Kpolik; Poland	Milan Savi; Serbia
-54 kg	Murat Azerhiev; Belarus	Michael Kpolik; Poland	Fabrizio Lodde; Italy
-57 kg	Yury Satsuk; Belarus	Marat Shikhaliev; Russia	Arnoldas Karpavicius; Lithuania
-57 kg	Yury Satsuk; Belarus	Marat Shikhaliev; Russia	Patrik Bodacz; Hungary
-60 kg	Magamed Khiramagomedov; Russia	Aleksandar Gogic; Serbia	Emrah Ögüt; Turkey
-60 kg	Magamed Khiramagomedov; Russia	Aleksandar Gogic; Serbia	Yury Dziatlau; Belarus
-63.5 kg	Zakarya Musagadziev; Russia	Sreten Mileti; Serbia	Yury Zkukouski; Belarus
-63.5 kg	Zakarya Musagadziev; Russia	Sreten Mileti; Serbia	Yilmaz Öztürk; Turkey
-67 kg	Kurban Akaev; Russia	Turan Qafarov; Azerbaijan	Piotr Kobylanski; Poland
-67 kg	Kurban Akaev; Russia	Turan Qafarov; Azerbaijan	Mislav Ili; Serbia
-71 kg	Dzmitry Baranau; Belarus	Marcin Parcheta; Poland	Vladimir Vulev; Bulgaria
-71 kg	Dzmitry Baranau; Belarus	Marcin Parcheta; Poland	Viktor Zaman; Croatia
-75 kg	Maksim Bulaska; Belarus	Evgeny Poskotin; Russia	Pavel Hennrich; Czech Republic
-75 kg	Maksim Bulaska; Belarus	Evgeny Poskotin; Russia	Ile Risteski; North Macedonia
-81 kg	Pavel Turuk; Belarus	Gergely Busai; Hungary	Bartosz Muszynski; Poland
-81 kg	Pavel Turuk; Belarus	Gergely Busai; Hungary	Aleksandr Bernjakov; Estonia
-86 kg	Nenad Pagonis; Serbia	Dzianis Hanenarcnak; Belarus	Evgeny Ganin; Russia
-86 kg	Nenad Pagonis; Serbia	Dzianis Hanenarcnak; Belarus	Radoska Rydzewski; Poland
-91 kg	Jzuagbe Ugonoh; Poland	Vladimir Mineev; Russia	Zoran Majkic; Croatia
-91 kg	Jzuagbe Ugonoh; Poland	Vladimir Mineev; Russia	Caualari Jaulo; Brazil
+91 kg	Aliaksei Kudin; Belarus	Inocente Guto; Brazil	Aleksey Papin; Russia
+91 kg	Aliaksei Kudin; Belarus	Inocente Guto; Brazil	Tihamer Brunner; Hungary

=== Women ===
Event	Gold	Silver	Bronze
-48 kg	Silvia La Notte; Italy	Yulia Elskaya; Russia	
-48 kg	Silvia La Notte; Italy	Yulia Elskaya; Russia	Plamena Dimova; Bulgaria
-52 kg	Adi Rotem; Israel	Eveniya Siviri; Russia	Zehra Gülgen; Turkey
-52 kg	Adi Rotem; Israel	Eveniya Siviri; Russia	Volka Prybylskaya; Belarus
-56 kg	Donatella Panu; Italy	Marta Czojnoska; Poland	Alena Hola; Czech Republic
-56 kg	Donatella Panu; Italy	Marta Czojnoska; Poland	Myra Winkelmann; Austria
-60 kg	Yulia Busigina; Russia	Sanja Samardzic; Bosnia and Herzegovina	Paola Capucci; Italy
-60 kg	Yulia Busigina; Russia	Sanja Samardzic; Bosnia and Herzegovina	Martina Müllerova; Czech Republic
-65 kg	Martina Jindrova; Czech Republic	Caterina Curro; Italy	Elena Solareva; Russia
-65 kg	Martina Jindrova; Czech Republic	Caterina Curro; Italy	Ina Ozerava; Belarus
-70 kg	Öttl Astrid; Austria	Kerry-Louise Norbury; Great Britain	
-70 kg	Öttl Astrid; Austria	Kerry-Louise Norbury; Great Britain	Zelda Malherbe; South Africa
