= Jorge Paixão =

Portuguese footballer and manager

Personal information
- Full name: Jorge Manuel da Silva Paixão Santos
- Date of birth: 19 December 1965 (age 60)
- Place of birth: Almada, Portugal
- Position: Forward

Team information
- Current team: COD Meknès (manager)

Youth career
- 1978–1980: Almada
- 1980–1982: Amora
- 1982–1983: Benfica
- 1983–1984: Amora

Senior career*
Years	Team	Apps	(Gls)
1984–1985	Amora	28	(2)
1985–1986	Académica	3	(0)
1986–1987	União Coimbra	24	(11)
1987–1988	Louletano	19	(2)
1988–1989	Bragança	0	(0)
1989–1993	Amora	74	(24)
1993–1995	Atlético Malveira		
Total		148	(39)

International career
1983	Portugal U16	1	(0)
1984	Portugal U18	6	(4)

Managerial career
- 2001–2002: Casa Pia (assistant)
- 2002: Académico Viseu (assistant)
- 2002–2005: Almada
- 2005: Casa Pia
- 2005–2006: Real Massamá
- 2007: Fátima
- 2007: Atlético
- 2007–2008: Pontassolense
- 2009: Caála
- 2009–2010: Estrela Amadora
- 2010–2011: Mafra
- 2011–2012: Mesaimeer
- 2013–2014: Farense
- 2014: Braga
- 2014: Zawisza Bydgoszcz
- 2014–2015: Olhanense
- 2015: Farense
- 2016: Mafra
- 2018–2019: Shenzhen (under-23)
- 2022: Rayon Sports
- 2022–2023: Al-Yarmouk
- 2023–2024: DHJ
- 2025: Al-Ain
- 2026–: COD Meknès
- * Club domestic league appearances and goals

Jorge Manuel da Silva Paixão Santos (born 19 December 1965), known as Paixão, is a Portuguese former professional footballer who played as a forward, currently manager of Botola Pro club COD Meknès.

== Playing career ==
Born in Almada, Setúbal District, Paixão's 11-year professional career was almost entirely spent in the Portuguese second and third divisions, representing Amora FC (two spells), C.F. União de Coimbra, Louletano D.C. and GD Bragança.

The exception to this was the 1985–86 season, when he appeared three times as a substitute for Académica de Coimbra in the Primeira Liga. He retired in June 1995 at the age of 29, following a spell with amateurs AC Malveira.

== Coaching career ==
Following retirement, Paixão moved into coaching. He first served as the assistant manager for two teams, before his first management role when in 2002 he was appointed head coach of Almada A.C. in the Setúbal Football Association. Over the next ten years, he was in charge of several clubs in the third tier, and also had spells abroad in Angola with C.R. Caála and Qatar with Mesaimeer SC.

Paixão was appointed at second-division side S.C. Farense in September 2013. In March of the following year, he first reached the top flight with S.C. Braga who were in tenth place, leading the team to ninth position after winning only two of his ten league games in charge, but reaching the semi-finals of the Taça de Portugal, where they were defeated by Rio Ave FC.

On 14 May 2014, Braga announced that Paixão's contract would not be renewed. On 24 June 2014, he signed for Polish club Zawisza Bydgoszcz, winning the Super Cup shortly after by defeating Legia Warsaw 3–2.

Paixão moved back to his native country in October 2014 with S.C. Olhanense, leaving his post the following February. He took charge of Farense also in the second tier in June, agreeing to a mutual termination of his contract on 30 November.

On 30 December 2015, Paixão was appointed at C.D. Mafra (also for a second time, having previously been coach in 2010); the team were struggling prior to his arrival, and he was unable to prevent their relegation from the second division. At the end of July 2016, he was replaced.

Arriving in 2018, Paixão then spent one year in China in charge of Shenzhen F.C.'s under-23 side. Subsequently, he worked in quick succession with Rayon Sports FC (Rwanda Premier League), Al-Yarmouk SC (Kuwaiti Division One) and Difaâ Hassani El Jadidi (Moroccan Botola 2).

On 20 February 2025, Paixão was appointed as manager of Saudi First Division League club Al-Ain FC. In July 2026, he returned to Morocco on a one-year deal at Botola Pro's COD Meknès.

== Honours ==
=== Manager ===
Zawisza Bydgoszcz

- Polish Super Cup: 2014
