= Hajry Redouane =

Moroccan retired footballer (born 1964)

Personal information
- Full name: Hajry Redouane
- Date of birth: 5 March 1964 (age 62)
- Place of birth: Casablanca, Morocco
- Height: 1.74 m (5 ft 8 1/2 in)
- Position: Midfielder

Youth career
- 1975–1985: Raja Casablanca

Senior career*
Years	Team	Apps	(Gls)
1985–1987	Raja Casablanca		
1987–1988	Benfica	9	(0)
1988–1989	Farense	21	(5)
1989–1990	União Madeira	16	(1)
1990–2000	Farense	243	(26)
2004–2005	São Marcos		

International career
?–1994	Morocco	25	(0)

Managerial career
- 2002: Farense
- 2006: Raja Casablanca
- 2008: Rachad Bernoussi
- * Club domestic league appearances and goals

Hajry Redouane (Note: The Arabic format of his name is Redouane Hajry) (Arabic: رضوان حجري) (born 5 March 1964) is a Moroccan retired footballer who played as an attacking midfielder, and a manager.

His 15-year professional playing career was mainly associated with Portugal, where he played mostly for Farense, captaining the team for most of his 11 seasons and being named best foreign player four times.

== Club career ==
Born in the Bourgogne quarter of Casablanca, Redouane began playing professionally with local Raja CA Casablanca. In 1987 the 23-year-old moved to Portugal where he would remain until his retirement, starting with top level giants S.L. Benfica.

With Benfica, he played and lost the 1988 European Cup final, becoming the first Moroccan to play a European Cup/Champions League final. He was also the second Moroccan to play an UEFA club competition final after Merry Krimau who had played the two legs of the 1978 UEFA Cup final with SC Bastia.

However, barred by several players, including experienced Portuguese internationals Carlos Manuel and Shéu, Hajry – known by his first name in the country – left after the 1987–88 season, signing with Algarve's S.C. Farense.

After only one year he joined fellow league side C.F. União, but returned to Faro at the end of the campaign.

Hajry was an important midfield element during his second spell with Farense, eventually amassing more than 300 official appearances. In 1994–95 he scored twice in 25 matches to help the club finish fifth and qualify for the first time ever to the UEFA Cup, assisting compatriot Hassan Nader – his teammate at the club for eight years – in many of his 21 successful strikes (competition best).

Hajry played with Farense until June 2000, retiring professionally at the age of 36 (he still played some amateur football in Portugal afterwards) after never having appeared in less than 20 games during his 11-year stint with the team. In the year 2002 he briefly coached the club (11 matches, winning two, drawing three and losing six – the first game was at the end of the 2001–02 season, as it eventually dropped to the second level).

Subsequently, Redouane served as assistant manager of former side Raja Casablanca, and took over as a caretaker manager following the sacking of Oscar Fulloné in November 2006. In the club, he also worked with former Farense teammate and boss Paco Fortes.

== Honours ==
Benfica

- European Cup runner-up: 1987–88

C.F. União

- Portuguese second division : 1989-90
