= Carlos Costa (footballer) =

Portuguese footballer and manager

Personal information
- Full name: Carlos Manuel Salgado Costa
- Date of birth: 8 November 1966 (age 59)
- Place of birth: Coimbra, Portugal
- Height: 1.82 m (6 ft 0 in)
- Position: Midfielder

Youth career
- 1979–1981: Académica
- 1981–1985: União Coimbra

Senior career*
Years	Team	Apps	(Gls)
1985–1986	ADC Adémia		
1986–1992	Lousanense		
1992–1993	Feirense	34	(18)
1993–1995	Beira-Mar	62	(8)
1995–2005	Farense		

Managerial career
- 2006–2008: Farense
- 2013–2014: Farense (assistant)
- * Club domestic league appearances and goals

Carlos Manuel Salgado Costa (born 8 November 1966) is a Portuguese football player and later manager. He played nine seasons and 282 games in the Primeira Liga for Farense and Beira-Mar.

== Career ==
Costa made his Primeira Liga debut for Beira-Ma on 22 August 1993 in a game against Estoril.
