= Vasco Faísca =

Portuguese footballer and manager

Personal information
- Full name: Vasco Manuel Vilhena Faísca Teixeira
- Date of birth: 27 August 1980 (age 46)
- Place of birth: Lisbon, Portugal
- Height: 1.84 m (6 ft 0 in)
- Position: Centre-back

Youth career
- 1991–1996: Farense
- 1996–1998: Sporting CP

Senior career*
Years	Team	Apps	(Gls)
1998–2000	Sporting CP	0	(0)
1998–2000	→ Lourinhanense (loan)	57	(1)
2000–2004	Vicenza	82	(1)
2004–2005	Académica	32	(0)
2005–2007	Belenenses	22	(0)
2007–2010	Padova	91	(0)
2010–2013	Ascoli	112	(3)
2013–2014	Platanias	26	(1)
2014–2015	Matera	28	(0)
2015–2016	Maceratese	35	(1)
2016–2017	Virtus Francavilla	18	(0)
Total		503	(7)

International career
1999–2000	Portugal U18	9	(0)
2000	Portugal U20	2	(0)
2000–2002	Portugal U21	15	(0)

Managerial career
- 2017–2018: Vianense (youth)
- 2018–2019: Vilafranquense (assistant)
- 2019: Olhanense
- 2019–2021: Braga B
- 2021: Alverca
- 2021–2023: Farense
- 2023–2024: Belenenses
- 2025: Academia Puerto Cabello
- * Club domestic league appearances and goals

Vasco Manuel Vilhena Faísca Teixeira (born 27 August 1980), known as Faísca, is a Portuguese former professional footballer who played as a central defender, currently a manager.

He spent the vast majority of his professional career in Italy after starting out at Sporting CP, representing in the country Vicenza, Padova and Ascoli and appearing in one Serie A match with the first club.

== Playing career ==
=== Club ===
Born in Lisbon, Faísca was a product of Sporting CP's youth system. In the summer of 2000 he was signed by Inter Milan alongside teammates Marco Caneira and Paulo Costa, in co-ownership with other clubs.

Faísca stayed in Italy and played with Vicenza Calcio for four seasons, having been sold for 1,200 million lire (€619,748)– one game in Serie A in 2000–01, the rest of his spell in Serie B– before his rights were acquired fully in June 2004. Shortly after, however, he returned to Portugal and joined Académica de Coimbra, making his Primeira Liga debut and being first choice (only two matches missed) as the Students narrowly avoided relegation.

In the 2005 off-season, Faísca signed for C.F. Os Belenenses, being fairly used in his first year but being deemed surplus to requirements soon afterwards. He returned to Italy in January 2007, joining Serie C1 team Calcio Padova and winning promotion in his second full campaign.

On 31 August 2010, Faísca moved to second-tier Ascoli Calcio 1898 FC as part of the deal that involved Jonas Portin. He suffered relegation at the end of 2012–13, terminating his contract which still had another year running.

Until his retirement at the age of 37, and save for one year in the Super League Greece with Platanias FC, Faísca competed in the Italian lower leagues, where he represented S.S. Matera Calcio, SS Maceratese 1922 and Virtus Francavilla Calcio.

=== International ===
Faísca appeared for the Portugal under-21 team at the 2002 UEFA European Championship in Switzerland, playing all group games as starter as the nation exited in that stage.

== Coaching career ==
After a spell with SC Vianense's youths, Faísca started his senior managerial career as an assistant at U.D. Vilafranquense. On 5 February 2019, was named head coach of S.C. Olhanense in the third tier, and lost 1–0 on his debut away to Real S.C. five days later.

On 27 December 2019, Faísca was confirmed at S.C. Braga B, second-placed in the same league, on a deal until the summer of 2022; he replaced Ruben Amorim, who was promoted to the first team. He left a year early for F.C. Alverca, where he won two and lost three of six games before exiting by mutual consent on 4 October 2021.

Faísca returned to the Algarve on 22 December 2021, signing with S.C. Farense who were second from bottom. His Liga Portugal 2 debut came the following 17 January in a 1–0 home loss to Leixões SC; in April, with the side safe from relegation, he signed for another season with a buyout clause of €1.5 million.

On 3 February 2023, Faísca was dismissed by Farense after failing to reach an agreement to leave, despite his team being in second place. His exit was announced one hour before the match against C.F. Estrela da Amadora, who were one point behind.

On 6 November 2023, Faísca was appointed at Belenenses, 17th in the second division shortly after promoting, in a return to the Estádio do Restelo 16 years later. He was relieved of his duties on 28 February 2024, after a ten-game winless run left them one place lower.

Faísca was named manager of Venezuelan Primera División club Academia Puerto Cabello on 3 February 2025.

== Managerial statistics ==
As of 25 February 2024

Managerial record by team and tenure
Team	Nat	From	To	Record								Ref
Team	Nat	From	To	G	W	D	L	GF	GA	GD	Win %	Ref
Olhanense	(Portugal)	5 February 2019	27 December 2019	31	21	5	5	77	28	+49	67.74	
Braga B	(Portugal)	27 December 2019	16 June 2021	38	22	7	9	84	36	+48	57.89	
Alverca	(Portugal)	25 June 2021	4 October 2021	6	3	1	2	13	8	+5	50.00	
Farense	(Portugal)	22 December 2021	3 February 2023	43	21	7	15	61	53	+8	48.84	
Belenenses	(Portugal)	6 November 2023	28 February 2024	14	2	3	9	9	25	−16	14.29	
Total				132	69	23	40	244	150	+94	52.27	—
