= Hassan Nader =

Moroccan footballer

Personal information
- Date of birth: 8 July 1965 (age 61)
- Place of birth: Casablanca, Morocco
- Height: 1.83 m (6 ft 0 in)
- Position: Striker

Senior career*
Years	Team	Apps	(Gls)
1983–1990	Wydad	92	(47)
1990–1992	Mallorca	45	(7)
1992–1995	Farense	78	(45)
1995–1997	Benfica	17	(7)
1997–2004	Farense	174	(56)
Total		406	(162)

International career
1987–2001	Morocco	31	(9)
- * Club domestic league appearances and goals

Hassan Nader (Arabic: حسن ناظر; born 8 July 1965) is a Moroccan former professional footballer who played as a striker.

He spent most of his 21-year senior career in Portugal – amassing Primeira Liga totals of 219 matches and 94 goals – mainly with Farense, where he surpassed the 100-goal mark in official games.

== Club career ==
Born in Casablanca, Nader started his career with local Wydad AC before signing with La Liga club RCD Mallorca in 1990–91. At the end of his second season the Balearic Islands team were relegated, and he also had a run-in with manager Lorenzo Serra Ferrer during his spell.

In July 1992, Nader moved to S.C. Farense in the Primeira Liga, becoming the league's top scorer in the 1994–95 campaign with 21 goals and being influential in the Algarve side's qualification for the UEFA Cup. For eight years, he shared teams with his compatriot Hajry Redouane.

Nader later joined S.L. Benfica, but appeared sparingly throughout two seasons and returned to Farense, where he would remain until his 2004 retirement at the age of 39, as the club was relegated to the Terceira Divisão. He scored 11 league goals in his final year.

== International career ==
A senior Morocco international on 31 occasions, Nader played for his country at the 1994 FIFA World Cup, scoring against the Netherlands in a 2–1 group stage loss, and at the 1988 and 1992 Africa Cup of Nations.

== Personal life ==
Nader's son, Mohcine, was also a footballer and a striker. Already born in Portugal, he too spent most of his career in that country.
