= Manuel Balela =

Portuguese footballer

Personal information
- Full name: Manuel José Marques Pires
- Date of birth: 21 October 1956 (age 70)
- Place of birth: Faro, Portugal

Youth career
- Years: Team
- 1976–1985: SC Farense

Managerial career
- 1985–1987: SC Farense (assistant coach)
- 1987–1989: Louletano(assistant coach)
- 1989–1994: SC Farense (assistant coach)
- 1994–1995: Louletano Desportos Clube
- 1995–1996: Wydad Casablanca
- 1996–1997: Kawkab Marrakech
- 1997–1999: SC Olhanense
- 1999–2000: União da Madeira
- 2000–2001: SC Farense
- 2001–2002: União da Madeira
- 2002–2005: SC Farense
- 2005–2006: Kawkab Marrakech
- 2006–2007: SC Olhanense
- 2008–2009: Louletano
- 2009–2010: Dong Tam Long An FC (assistant coach)

Manuel José Marques Pires, better known as Manuel Balela (21 October 1956) is a Portuguese football coach.
