= Artur Vicente =

Cape Verdean footballer

Personal information
- Full name: Artur Jorge Rocha Vicente
- Date of birth: 26 December 1972 (age 53)
- Place of birth: Santa Catarina, Portugal
- Height: 1.75 m (5 ft 9 in)
- Position: Forward

Youth career
- 1986–1991: Vitória Clube de Lisboa

Senior career*
Years	Team	Apps	(Gls)
1991–1992	Vitória Clube de Lisboa		
1992–1993	Mineiro Aljustrelense		
1993–1994	Olivais		
1994–1995	Fanhões		
1995–1996	Desportivo Beja		
1996	Estoril		
1996–1997	Espinho		
1997–1998	Salgueiros		
1998	Boavista		
1999	Leiria		
1999–2000	Rio Ave		
2000–2001	Vitória FC		
2001–2004	Portimonense		
2004–2005	Santa Clara		
2005–2006	Portimonense		
2006–2007	Atlético		
2007–2008	Juventude Évora		

International career
2000–2003	Cape Verde	3	(0)
- * Club domestic league appearances and goals

Artur Jorge Rocha Vicente (born 26 December 1972) is a retired Cape Verdean football striker.
