= Paco Fortes =

Spanish footballer and manager

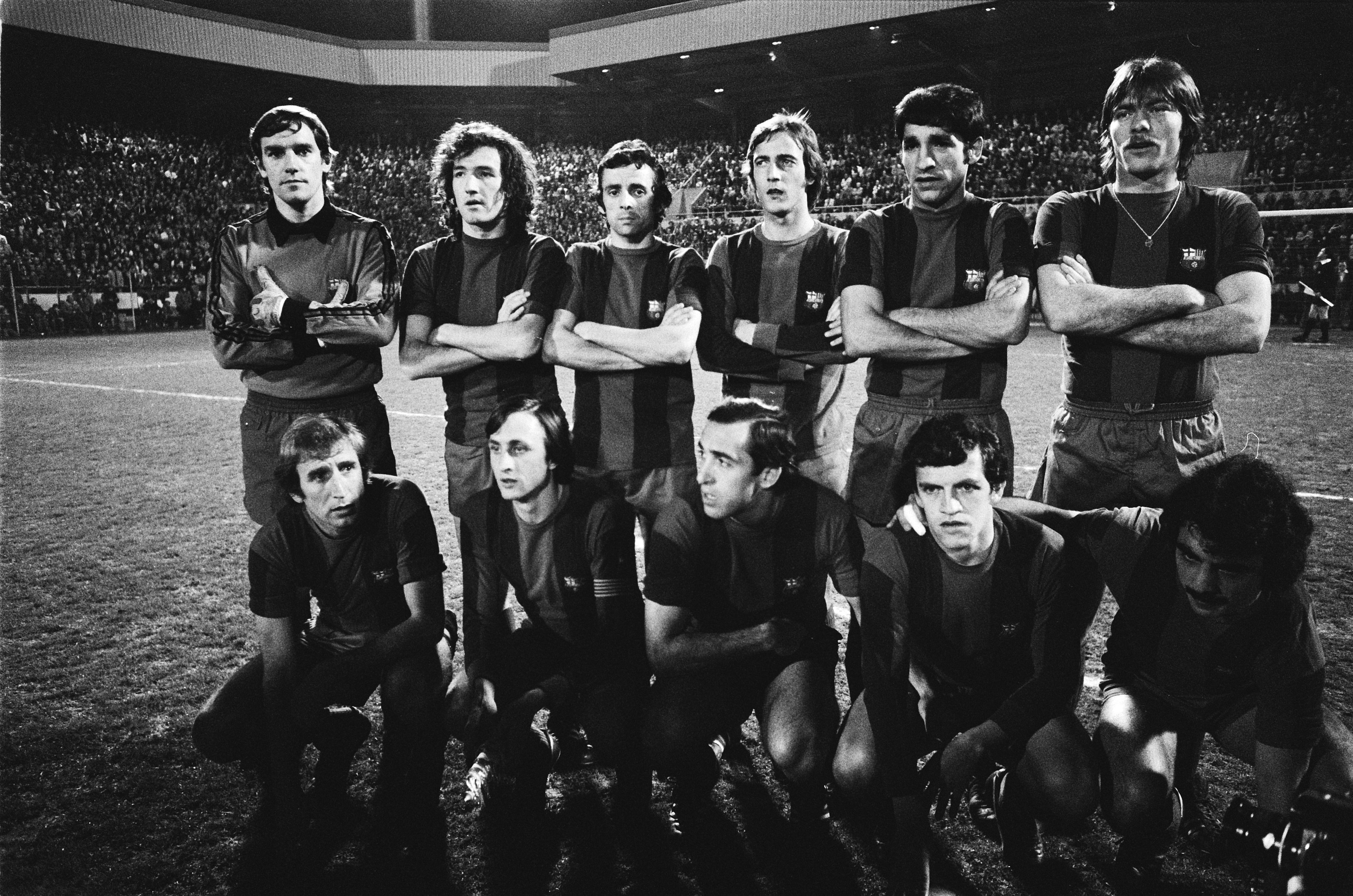
- Fortes (first row, first to right) in 1978

Personal information
- Full name: Francisco Fortes Calvo
- Date of birth: 4 January 1955 (age 71)
- Place of birth: Barcelona, Spain
- Height: 1.68 m (5 ft 6 in)
- Position: Forward

Youth career
- Barcelona

Senior career*
Years	Team	Apps	(Gls)
1974–1975	Barcelona B	26	(1)
1975–1979	Barcelona	44	(5)
1976–1977	→ Málaga (loan)	17	(1)
1979–1982	Español	66	(1)
1982–1984	Valladolid	48	(7)
1984–1989	Farense	116	(29)
Total		317	(44)

International career
1975	Spain	1	(0)
1976	Spain amateur	1	(0)

Managerial career
- 1989–1999: Farense
- 1999–2001: Imortal
- 2001: União Lamas
- 2002: Farense
- 2003–2005: Pinhalnovense
- 2006–2007: Raja Casablanca
- 2007–2008: Pinhalnovense
- * Club domestic league appearances and goals

Francisco "Paco" Fortes Calvo (born 4 January 1955) is a Spanish former football forward and manager.

Even though he also played for Barcelona, his career was mainly associated with Farense in Portugal, either as a player or manager.

== Playing career ==
Born in Barcelona, Catalonia, Fortes emerged through local FC Barcelona's youth ranks, going on to spend four years with the first team and also being loaned one season to CD Málaga. He only featured regularly for the former in 1975–76 – 23 matches, three goals – adding 11 UEFA Cup appearances with three goals in two separate spells. He made his La Liga debut on 5 October 1975 at the age of 20, in a 3–0 home win against Granada CF.

Fortes signed for neighbours RCD Español in 1979 after being released by Barcelona, staying three seasons with the club. Subsequently, he joined Real Valladolid still in the top flight, going on to appear in 175 games and score 14 goals in the competition. He earned his only cap for Spain on 16 November 1975, playing 15 minutes in the 2–2 draw in Romania for the UEFA Euro 1976 qualifiers.

In summer 1984, the 29-year-old Fortes moved to S.C. Farense in Portugal, being relegated from the Primeira Liga in his first year but winning immediate promotion. He appeared in more than 100 official matches for the Algarve side in his five-year stint.

== Coaching career ==
In late 1988, aged 33, Fortes retired from football and immediately started coaching Farense. He was in charge of eight games that season, winning four and drawing two, but the team eventually could not escape relegation after ranking 18th. Promotion befell the following campaign, as champions.

Fortes remained at the helm of the club for one decade, managing four consecutive top-eight finishes from 1991 to 1995, including a best-ever fifth in 1994–95 as Farense qualified for the UEFA Cup for the first time in their history. He was dismissed after the 21st round in 1998–99, moving to neighbouring Imortal D.C. of the Segunda Liga.

Early into 2001–02, after only six games with C.F. União de Lamas (also second tier), Fortes returned to his beloved Farense, in the midst of a severe financial crisis. He was one of four coaches during the season – this included his former player Hajry Redouane – as the team were eventually relegated. After leaving midway through the following campaign, he spent two full seasons and part of a third with C.D. Pinhalnovense in division three.

After reuniting with Redouane at Raja CA, Fortes returned to Pinhalnovense for one final year, then lost all connection with the football world. Undergoing serious financial problems, he contacted former club Barcelona's Agrupació Barça Veterans, who arranged for him to work as a controller in the Port of Barcelona.

== Honours ==
=== Player ===
Barcelona

- Copa del Rey: 1977–78

Valladolid

- Copa de la Liga: 1984

Farense

- Segunda Liga: 1985–86

=== Manager ===
Farense

- Segunda Liga: 1989–90
