= Dias Graça =

Brazilian footballer (born 1964)

Personal information
- Full name: António Dias Graça Nunes
- Date of birth: 26 January 1964 (age 62)
- Place of birth: Rio de Janeiro, Brazil
- Position: Goalkeeper

Youth career
- 1979–1983: Varzim

Senior career*
Years	Team	Apps	(Gls)
1983–1986	Varzim	6	(0)
1983–1984	→ Lousada (loan)		
1986–1987	Gil Vicente	29	(0)
1988–1990	Benfica	0	(0)
2001–2002	Os Limianos		
- * Club domestic league appearances and goals

António Dias Graça Nunes (born 26 January 1964), commonly known as Dias Graça, is a former Brazilian professional footballer.

== Career ==
Graça started his career with Varzim.

== Career statistics ==
=== Club ===
Club	Season	League			Cup		Other		Total	
Club	Season	Division	Apps	Goals	Apps	Goals	Apps	Goals	Apps	Goals
Varzim	1983–84	Primeira Divisão	0	0	0	0	0	0	0	0
Varzim	1984–85	Primeira Divisão	5	0	1	0	0	0	6	0
Varzim	1985–86	Segunda Divisão	1	0	0	0	0	0	1	0
Varzim	Total		6	0	1	0	0	0	7	0
Gil Vicente	1986–87	Segunda Divisão	29	0	1	0	0	0	30	0
Benfica	1987–88	Primeira Divisão	0	0	0	0	0	0	0	0
Benfica	1988–89	Primeira Divisão	0	0	1	0	0	0	1	0
Benfica	1989–90	Primeira Divisão	0	0	0	0	0	0	0	0
Benfica	Total		0	0	1	0	0	0	1	0
Career total			35	0	3	0	0	0	38	0
