= Skoda (Portuguese footballer) =

Portuguese footballer

Personal information
- Full name: João Rafael dos Santos
- Date of birth: 17 March 1960 (age 66)
- Place of birth: Faro, Portugal
- Position: Midfielder

Youth career
- Farense

Senior career*
Years	Team	Apps	(Gls)
1978–1983	Farense	94	(7)
1983–1984	Boavista	10	(0)
1984–1993	Portimonense	247	(21)
Total		351	(28)

International career
1983–1988	Portugal U23	3	(0)
1987	Portugal U21	1	(0)
1987	Portugal	1	(0)
- * Club domestic league appearances and goals

João Rafael dos Santos (born 17 March 1960 in Faro, Algarve), known as Skoda, is a Portuguese former professional footballer who played as a central midfielder.
