= Renato Marques (Portuguese footballer) =

Portuguese footballer

Renato Favinha Marques (born 14 January 1996) is a Portuguese footballer who plays for S.C. Olhanense, as a midfielder.

== Career ==
Marques was born in Loulé. On 22 February 2015, he made his professional debut with Olhanense in a 2014–15 Segunda Liga match against Santa Clara.

== Personal life ==
His father Ademar Marques was also a footballer and played for the national team.
