= Gérce =

- Coat of arms

- Location of Gérce in Hungary
- Coordinates: 47.21402°N 17.01808°E
- Country: Hungary
- Region: Western Transdanubia
- County: Vas
- Subregion: Sárvári
- Rank: Village

Area
  - Total: 18.30 km^{2} (7.07 sq mi)

Population (1 January 2008)
  - Total: 1,189
  - Density: 64.97/km^{2} (168.3/sq mi)
- Time zone: UTC+1 (CET)
  - Summer (DST): UTC+2 (CEST)
- Postal code: 9672
- Area code: +36 95
- KSH code: 26152
- Website: https://gerce.hu/

Gérce is a village in Vas county, Hungary.
