= 1987–88 Primeira Divisão =

54th season of top-tier Portuguese football

Primeira Liga
- Season: 1987-88
- Champions: F.C. Porto; 10th title
- Relegated: O Elvas; Varzim; Salgueiros; Rio Ave; Académica; Covilhã
- European Cup: Porto (first round)
- Cup Winners' Cup: V. Guimarães (first round)
- UEFA Cup: Benfica (first round); Belenenses (first round); Sporting CP (first round); Boavista(pre-eliminatoria)
- Matches: 380
- Goals: 863 (2.27 per match)
- Top goalscorer: Paulinho Cascavel (21 goals)

Statistics of Portuguese Liga in the 1987–88 season.

== Overview ==
It was contested by 20 teams, and F.C. Porto won the championship.

== League standings ==
Pos	Team	Pld	W	D	L	GF	GA	GD	Pts	Qualification or relegation
1	Porto (C)	38	29	8	1	88	15	+73	66	Qualification to European Cup first round
2	Benfica	38	19	13	6	59	25	+34	51	Qualification to UEFA Cup first round
3	Belenenses	38	18	12	8	52	38	+14	48	Qualification to UEFA Cup first round
4	Sporting CP	38	17	13	8	62	41	+21	47	Qualification to UEFA Cup first round
5	Boavista	38	16	14	8	42	25	+17	46	Qualification to UEFA Cup first round
6	Espinho	38	13	14	11	42	38	+4	40	
7	Chaves	38	13	14	11	51	31	+20	40	
8	Vitória de Setúbal	38	15	10	13	56	43	+13	40	
9	Marítimo	38	11	17	10	36	37	−1	39	
10	Penafiel	38	10	18	10	36	45	−9	38	
11	Braga	38	8	18	12	32	42	−10	34	
12	Farense	38	12	10	16	36	50	−14	34	
13	Portimonense	38	12	10	16	35	50	−15	34	
14	Vitória de Guimarães	38	11	11	16	48	50	−2	33	Qualification to Cup Winners' Cup first round
15	O Elvas (R)	38	8	17	13	35	40	−5	33	Relegation to Segunda Divisão
16	Académica (R)	38	9	15	14	32	42	−10	33	Relegation to Segunda Divisão
17	Varzim (R)	38	7	16	15	31	52	−21	30	Relegation to Segunda Divisão
18	Rio Ave (R)	38	7	14	17	29	67	−38	28	Relegation to Segunda Divisão
19	Salgueiros (R)	38	6	13	19	31	62	−31	25	Relegation to Segunda Divisão
20	Covilhã (R)	38	5	11	22	30	70	−40	21	Relegation to Segunda Divisão

Source: RSSSF
(C) Champions; (R) Relegated

== Results ==
Home \ Away	ACA	BEL	BEN	BOA	BRA	CHA	ESP	FAR	MAR	ELV	PEN	PTM	POR	RAV	SAL	SCP	SCO	VAR	VGU	VSE
Académica		0–0	2–4	0–0	2–1	1–1	2–2	2–0	2–0	0–0	1–1	2–1	0–1	1–3	3–0	1–1	1–1	1–0	1–0	0–0
Belenenses	1–0		2–1	2–0	1–0	2–0	0–0	4–1	1–0	2–1	3–1	4–2	0–0	3–0	2–2	2–3	2–0	2–2	2–0	2–1
Benfica	1–1	2–0		2–0	0–0	1–1	5–1	2–2	0–1	1–0	4–0	3–1	1–1	2–0	2–0	4–1	4–0	2–2	3–0	0–1
Boavista	1–0	0–0	1–1		1–0	1–0	1–0	2–0	1–1	2–0	0–0	3–0	0–1	6–0	2–1	0–0	2–2	1–1	3–0	1–0
Braga	1–0	1–1	0–0	1–3		1–0	0–1	2–1	1–1	2–2	2–0	2–0	1–1	1–0	1–1	1–0	3–1	1–1	2–2	2–2
Chaves	1–1	0–0	1–0	0–0	2–0		0–1	6–1	0–0	0–1	2–2	0–1	0–1	4–0	2–2	1–1	2–1	6–1	3–1	2–0
Espinho	0–2	2–1	0–1	2–0	2–2	2–1		1–0	3–2	6–0	0–0	2–3	0–1	1–1	1–0	0–0	2–0	1–0	1–3	4–1
Farense	2–0	1–0	1–0	0–0	1–0	1–0	1–1		1–1	1–3	2–0	2–0	0–1	0–0	2–1	0–2	7–0	1–0	2–1	0–0
Marítimo	2–1	1–0	1–1	2–3	1–1	0–3	0–0	1–1		1–0	0–0	1–1	0–2	0–0	3–0	2–3	1–1	3–1	1–0	1–0
O Elvas	1–1	2–3	0–0	1–2	0–0	0–2	4–1	0–0	1–1		0–0	3–0	2–3	0–0	3–0	0–0	5–0	0–0	0–0	1–1
Penafiel	2–1	1–0	0–1	0–0	3–0	0–0	2–1	3–2	1–2	0–0		0–0	0–0	4–1	0–0	4–0	3–2	2–1	0–0	0–0
Portimonense	1–1	1–1	1–2	1–0	1–1	0–3	1–1	3–0	1–1	0–1	0–0		0–0	5–1	2–1	1–1	1–0	0–2	0–4	1–0
Porto	1–0	7–1	3–0	2–0	3–0	3–1	1–0	4–0	2–0	4–0	2–0	1–0		5–0	5–0	2–0	4–0	3–0	3–1	1–0
Rio Ave	2–1	0–0	0–1	0–0	3–0	0–0	1–0	2–1	1–1	2–0	0–0	0–1	0–7		2–2	1–2	0–0	1–1	2–1	2–2
Salgueiros	0–0	2–0	0–0	0–1	0–0	2–2	1–1	0–1	1–0	2–1	2–2	0–1	1–5	1–0		2–4	2–2	1–0	0–0	0–4
Sporting CP	4–0	1–1	1–1	1–1	2–1	0–0	0–0	2–0	0–1	0–0	7–0	2–0	2–1	4–1	3–2		2–0	1–2	2–2	2–0
Sporting da Covilhã	0–1	1–2	0–3	2–0	0–0	0–1	1–1	3–1	1–2	1–2	0–0	2–0	1–1	1–1	1–0	1–2		1–0	1–2	2–2
Varzim	0–0	1–1	0–0	1–1	0–0	2–1	0–0	0–0	0–0	0–0	3–4	1–2	0–2	2–1	1–0	1–3	1–0		2–2	2–0
Vitória de Guimarães	3–0	0–1	0–2	0–3	1–1	0–0	0–1	3–0	1–1	1–1	2–1	0–1	0–0	4–1	3–0	3–2	2–0	3–0		1–3
Vitória de Setúbal	3–0	1–3	0–2	1–0	2–0	1–3	0–0	0–0	1–0	1–0	4–0	2–1	4–4	3–0	0–2	2–1	5–1	5–0	4–2	

Legend: Blue = home team win; Yellow = draw; Red = away team win.

== Season statistics ==
=== Top goalscorers ===
Rank	Player	Club	Goals
1	(Brazil) Paulinho Cascavel	Sporting	23
2	(Portugal) Fernando Gomes	Porto	21
2	(Bulgaria) Radoslav Zdravkov	Chaves	21
4	(Portugal) Manuel Fernandes	Vitória de Setúbal	16
4	(Portugal) Aparício	Vitória de Setúbal	16
6	(Brazil) Ademir Alcântara	Vitória de Guimarães	15
6	(Brazil) César	Penafiel	15
8	(Sweden) Mats Magnusson	Benfica	13
8	(Portugal) Chico Faria	Belenenses	13
10	(Portugal) Rui Águas	Benfica	12
10	(Portugal) Rui Barros	Porto	12
10	(Portugal) António Sousa	Porto	12
10	(Guinea-Bissau) Forbs	Portimonense	12

== Attendances ==
#	Club	Average
1	Porto	42,734
2	Benfica	40,211
3	Sporting	30,526
4	Vitória SC	15,842
5	Vitória FC	13,395
6	Braga	12,711
7	Boavista	10,842
8	Farense	10,737
9	Os Belenenses	10,526
10	Marítimo	10,447
11	Académica	9,474
12	Chaves	9,342
13	Varzim	9,305
14	Espinho	8,579
15	Rio Ave	7,868
16	Penafiel	7,500
17	O Elvas	6,684
18	Salgueiros	6,684
19	Portimonense	6,289
20	Covilhã	5,263
