= Amílcar Fonseca =

Portuguese footballer

Amílcar
Personal information
- Full name: Amílcar Lopes da Fonseca
- Date of birth: 15 February 1954 (age 72)
- Place of birth: Lisbon, Portugal
- Position: Defender

Senior career*
Years	Team	Apps	(Gls)
1973–1975	Oriental	49	(0)
1975–1979	Estoril	94	(0)
1979–1981	Belenenses	58	(1)
1981–1983	Portimonense	56	(1)
1983–1984	Estoril	30	(0)
1984–1986	Estrela Amadora		
1986–1988	Silves		

International career
1981	Portugal	1	(0)

Managerial career
- 1991–1994: Portimonense
- 1995–1997: Portimonense
- 2001–2002: Portimonense
- 2004–2005: Louletano
- * Club domestic league appearances and goals

Amílcar Lopes da Fonseca (born 15 February 1954), known as simply Amílcar, is a Portuguese retired footballer who played as a defender.
