= José Forbs =

Bissau-Guinean footballer

Personal information
- Full name: José Manuel Forbs
- Date of birth: 15 August 1963 (age 63)
- Place of birth: Setúbal, Portugal
- Height: 1.76 m (5 ft 9 in)
- Position: Forward

Senior career*
Years	Team	Apps	(Gls)
1981–1982	União Bissau		
1982–1983	Bombarralense		
1983–1984	Peniche	6	(6)
1984–1986	Sporting CP	13	(0)
1986–1988	Portimonense	62	(18)
1988–1989	Sporting CP	29	(4)
1989–1990	Boavista	28	(8)
1990–1995	Braga	128	(22)
1995–1997	Penafiel	57	(12)
1997–1998	Tirsense		
- * Club domestic league appearances and goals

José Manuel Forbs, known as Forbs (born 15 August 1963) is a Bissau-Guinean former professional footballer who played as a forward. He also holds Portuguese citizenship.

He played 11 seasons and 260 games and scored 52 goals in the Primeira Liga for Braga, Portimonense, Sporting CP and Boavista.

== Club career ==
He made his Primeira Liga debut for Sporting CP on 26 August 1984 as a late substitute in a 3–0 victory over Vitória de Guimarães.
