= Ademar Marques =

Portuguese footballer

Personal information
- Full name: Ademar Moreira Marques
- Date of birth: 4 March 1959 (age 67)
- Place of birth: Lisbon, Portugal
- Height: 1.71 m (5 ft 7 1/2 in)
- Position: Midfielder

Senior career*
Years	Team	Apps	(Gls)
1977–1983	Sporting CP	97	(9)
1983–1984	Marítimo		
1984–1985	FC Porto	5	(0)
1985–1986	Belenenses	14	(1)
1986–1987	Vitória Setúbal		
1987–1993	Farense		

International career
	Portugal	2	(0)
- * Club domestic league appearances and goals

Ademar Moreira Marques (born 4 March 1959 in Lisbon) is a former Portuguese footballer who played as a midfielder.

== Personal ==
His son Renato Marques is a professional footballer.
