= S.C. Olhanense =

Sports club in Portugal

Olhanense
- Full name: Sporting Clube Olhanense
- Nickname: Leões de Olhão (Lions of Olhão)
- Founded: 27 April 1912; 114 years ago
- Ground: Estádio José Arcanjo
- Capacity: 5,661
- Chairman: Isidoro Sousa
- Manager: Miguel Serôdio
- League: Algarve FA First Division
- 2022–23: Campeonato de Portugal, 13th of 14
- Website: www.scolhanense.com
Home colours	Away colours

Sporting Clube Olhanense (Portuguese pronunciation: [sɨˈpɔɾtĩ ˈkluβɨ ɔʎɐˈnẽsɨ]), commonly known as Olhanense, is a Portuguese sports club from Olhão, Algarve.

Its football team was founded on 27 April 1912 and currently plays in the Algarve Football Association First Division, the fifth tier of Portuguese football. It holds home matches at the 5,661-spectator capacity Estádio José Arcanjo.

Olhanense won the Campeonato de Portugal (now Taça de Portugal) in 1924, their most prestigious honour in history. They most recently played in the Primeira Liga in 2014 and the second tier in 2017.

== History ==
Founded on 27 April 1912, it became the branch number 4 of Sporting Clube de Portugal (Sporting CP).

Olhanense's earliest major honour was winning the 1923–24 Campeonato de Portugal (now Taça de Portugal), the largest football cup competition in Portugal. It also became the first team from the Algarve region to reach the top level of Portuguese football, after winning the Algarve Football Association in 1941. Among its achievements was a fourth-place finish in the 1945–46 season. In 1951, after ten consecutive seasons, the club returned to the second division.

Following this descent, the team only returned to the top flight for five seasons in the rest of the 20th century – three in the early 1960s and two in the mid-1970s – at time when rivals Farense and Portimonense had their most successful years. Managed by former Portugal international defender Jorge Costa, the team returned to the Primeira Liga as champions of the 2008–09 Liga de Honra by defeating Gondomar 1–0.

After five years in the top flight, Olhanense were relegated in May 2014 by finishing last in a season in which they had three managers. The result left the Algarve without a top-flight team. Three years later, the team finished last in the LigaPro, therefore falling out of the professional leagues for the first time in 13 years. For the first half of 2021, former Netherlands international Edgar Davids was the manager. The team missed out on promotion to the new Liga 3 that year, thus falling into the fourth tier. The 2022–23 season ended with relegation to the Algarve FA's First Division, a first such descent.

== Rivalries ==
The club has rivalries with fellow Algarve clubs Farense and Portimonense.

== Players ==
=== First-team squad ===
As of 16 November 2023

Note: Flags indicate national team as defined under FIFA eligibility rules; some limited exceptions apply. Players may hold more than one non-FIFA nationality.

No.	Pos.	Nation	Player
1	GK	POR	Tiago Maia
2	MF	NED	Nicolas Pinto
3	DF	POR	Hugo Matias
4	DF	POR	Nuno Pires
5	DF	BRA	Raurison Dias
6	MF	POR	Pirika
7	FW	BRA	Yaggo Gomes
8	MF	NED	Danilson Silva
9	MF	CAN	Philip-Joseph Tavares
10	FW	POR	Januário Jesus
11	FW	BRA	Peterson Flausino
13	FW	POR	Rafael Sousa

No.	Pos.	Nation	Player
14	FW	POR	Miguel Serôdio
15	DF	POR	Iuri Santos
16	MF	ANG	Virgílio Menezes
17	DF	POR	Gonçalo Domingues
19	DF	BRA	Rafa Santos
20	FW	POR	Leandro Pinto
21	MF	FRA	Alexandre Dias
22	DF	FRA	Marco Jesus
23	DF	FRA	Afonso Lopes
30	GK	POR	Rodrigo Mestre
40	GK	POR	Francisco Lameirão

== Honours ==
=== Domestic honours ===
- Campeonato de Portugal
  - Winners: 1923–24
- Taça de Portugal
  - Runners-up: 1944–45
- Segunda Liga
  - Winners: 2008–09
- Segunda Divisão
  - Winners: 1935–36, 1940–41, 2003–04
- Terceira Divisão
  - Winners: 1969–70
- AF Algarve First Division
  - Winners (16): 1921–22, 1923–24, 1924–25, 1925–26, 1926–27, 1930–31, 1932–33, 1938–39, 1939–40, 1940–41, 1941–42, 1942–43, 1943–44, 1944–45, 1945–46, 1946–47

=== Personnel honours ===
- LPFP Breakthrough Coach of the Year
  - 2008–09: Jorge Costa
- SJPF Young Player of the Month
  - André Castro: September 2009, January 2010, February 2010
  - Wilson Eduardo: September 2011
  - André Pinto: November 2011
  - Salvador Agra: March 2012

== League and cup history ==
Season	League									Cup	Notes
Season	Tier	Pos	Pld	W	D	L	GF	GA	Pts	Cup	Notes
1941–42	1	8	22	6	2	14	42	83	14	Quarterfinals	
1942–43	1	5	18	8	2	8	44	48	18	Last 16	
1943–44	1	5	18	10	2	6	65	34	22	Last 16	
1944–45	1	6	18	6	4	8	41	41	16	Final	
1945–46	1	4	22	13	1	8	65	39	27	Last 16	Best classification ever
1946–47	1	6	26	11	4	11	69	73	26	Not held	
1947–48	1	11	26	5	7	14	48	66	17	Last 32	
1948–49	1	7	26	10	4	12	51	55	24	Last 32	
1949–50	1	9	26	8	8	10	48	57	24	Not held	
1950–51	1	↓ 14	26	7	3	16	31	77	17	Last 16	Relegated
...
1961–62	1	8	26	8	6	12	33	41	22		
1962–63	1	8	26	7	7	12	29	38	21		
1963–64	1	↓ 13	26	2	8	16	20	57	12		Relegated
...
1973–74	1	11	30	8	6	16	35	69	22		
1974–75	1	↓ 15	30	6	5	19	41	70	17		Relegated
...+
1996–97	3	7	34	14	8	12	34	36	50		
1997–98	3	13	34	10	14	10	47	42	44	5th round	
1998–99	3	4	34	15	13	6	51	34	58	4th round	
1999–00	3	6	38	17	13	8	57	34	64		
2000–01	3	11	38	13	14	11	45	44	53		
2001–02	3	12	38	13	9	16	40	44	48	2nd round	
2002–03	3	10	38	14	13	11	60	50	55	2nd round	
2003–04	3	↑ 1	38	26	8	4	77	29	86	3rd round	Promoted
2004–05	2	9	34	11	11	12	32	31	44	Last 128	
2005–06	2	5	34	13	13	8	41	28	52	Last 64	
2006–07	2	9	30	10	10	10	29	31	40	4th round	
2007–08	2	5	30	12	9	9	33	33	45	5th round	
2008–09	2	↑ 1	30	18	4	8	52	32	58	3rd round	Promoted
2009–10	1	13	30	5	14	11	31	46	29	3rd round	
2010–11	1	11	30	7	13	10	24	34	34	5th round	
2011–12	1	8	30	9	12	9	36	38	39	Quarterfinals	
2012–13	1	14	30	5	10	15	26	42	25	4th round	
2013–14	1	↓ 16	30	6	6	18	21	49	24	4th round	Relegated
2014–15	2	16	46	13	16	17	51	56	55	3rd round	
2015–16	2	8	46	19	12	15	42	39	69	3rd round	
2016–17	2	↓ 22	42	7	7	28	45	83	28	4th round	Relegated
2017–18	3	3	30	18	4	8	42	30	58	3rd round	
2018–19	3	5	34	19	6	9	68	32	63	1st round	
2019–20	3	1	25	17	6	2	57	19	57	2nd round	
2020–21	3	3	26	12	6	8	29	21	42	1st round	
2021–22	4	5	26	11	10	5	37	29	43	4th round	
2022–23	4	↓ 13	26	5	2	19	18	50	17	3rd round	Relegated

== Managerial history ==
- (Portugal) Júlio Costa (1923–1925)
- (Portugal) Cassiano (1936–1940)
- (Portugal) Cassiano (1944–1945)
- (Portugal) Cassiano (1948–1949)
- (Spain) Pepe Lopez (1950–1951)
- (Portugal) Armando Martins (1953–1954)
- (Chile) Javier Mascaró (1954–1955)
- (Spain) Rafael Pineda (1955–1956)
- (Portugal) José João (1957–1958)
- (Portugal) Joaquim Paulo (1958–1959)
- (Portugal) Artur Quaresma (1959–1960)
- (Portugal) Cassiano (1960–1961)
- (Portugal) Francisco André (1961)
- (Portugal) Chinita (1961–1962)
- (Portugal) Casaca (1962)
- (Portugal) Joaquim Paulo (1962–63)
- (Portugal) Armando Carneiro (1963)
- (Portugal) Chinita (1963–1964)
- (Spain) Ruperto Garcia (1963–1964)
- (Romania) Iosif Fabian (1964–1965)
- (Portugal) José Mendes (1964–1965)
- (Portugal) Severiano Correia (1965–1967)
- (Brazil) Genê (1967)
- (Portugal) Veríssimo Alves (1967–1968)
- (Spain) Ruperto Garcia (1968–1969)
- (Brazil) Osvaldo Silva (1969–71)
- (Portugal) Orlando Ramín (1971–1972)
- (Portugal) Artur Santos (1972–1973)
- (Argentina) Jim López (1973)
- (Portugal) Manuel de Oliveira (1973–1974)
- (Portugal) Joaquim Paulo (1974)
- (Argentina) Gonzalito (1974–1975)
- (Portugal) Alexandrino (1975)
- (Angola) Marçal (1975–1976)
- (Portugal) Basora (1976)
- (Uruguay) Milton Trinidad (1976–1977)
- (Hungary) János Hrotkó (1976–1977)
- (Spain) Miguel Vinuesa (1977–1978)
- (Portugal) Carlos Sério (1978)
- (Hungary) János Hrotkó (1978–1979)
- (Portugal) Hélder Pereira (1979–1980)
- (Spain) Miguel Vinuesa (1980)
- (Portugal) Júlio Amador (1980)
- (Portugal) Carlos Silva (1980–1984)
- (Portugal) Mário Lino (1984–1985)
- (Portugal) Manuel Cajuda(1985–1987)
- (Portugal) Álvaro Carolino (1987–1988)
- (Portugal) José Dinis (1988)
- (Portugal) Manuel Cajuda (1988–1989)
- (Mozambique) Mário Wilson (1989–1990)
- (Portugal) Pedro Gomes (1990)
- (Brazil) Ademir Vieira (1990)
- (Portugal) Benvindo Assis (1990–1991)
- (Portugal) Ricardo Formosinho (1991)
- (Portugal) José Rocha (1991)
- (Portugal) Alberto Vivas (1991–1992)
- (Portugal) Ricardo Formosinho (1992)
- (Portugal) Carlos Silva (1992)
- (Brazil) Ademir Vieira (1992–1993)
- (Bulgaria) Stoycho Mladenov (1993–96)
- (Portugal) Fernando Mendes (1996)
- (Bulgaria) Plamen Lipenski (1996–1997)
- (Brazil) Zinho (1997)
- (Portugal) Manuel Balela (1997–99)
- (Netherlands) Floris Schaap (1999–2000)
- (Portugal) Fanã (2000)
- (Portugal) Pitico (2000–2001)
- (Portugal) Horácio Gonçalves (2001)
- (Portugal) Vítor Urbano (2001–Mar, 2003)
- (Portugal) Rui Gorriz (Mar, 2003 – May 18, 2003)
- (Portugal) Paulo Sérgio (July 1, 2003 – May 16, 2006)
- (Portugal) Manuel Balela (July 15, 2006 – Oct 24, 2006)
- (Portugal) Álvaro Magalhães (Oct 24, 2006 – Dec 28, 2007)
- (Portugal) Diamantino Miranda (Jan 1, 2008 – May 26, 2008)
- (Portugal) Jorge Costa (June 16, 2008 – May 9, 2010)
- (Mozambique) Daúto Faquirá (June 4, 2010 – Dec 30, 2011)
- (Portugal) Sérgio Conceição (Jan 2, 2012 – Jan 7, 2013)
- (Portugal) Manuel Cajuda (Jan 8, 2013 – May 1, 2013)
- (Portugal) Bruno Saraiva (May 1, 2013 – June 29, 2013)
- (Portugal) Abel Xavier (July 6, 2013 – Oct 28, 2013)
- (Portugal) Paulo Alves (Oct 29, 2013 – Jan 7, 2014)
- (Italy) Giuseppe Galderisi (Jan 7, 2014 – July 7, 2014)
- (Portugal) Toni Conceição (July 7, 2014 – Oct 8, 2014)
- (Portugal) Jorge Paixão (Oct 8, 2014 – Feb 2, 2015)
- (Italy) Cristiano Bacci (Feb 2, 2015 – Oct 27, 2016)
- (Portugal) Bruno Baltazar (Oct 28, 2016 – Feb 6, 2017)
- (Portugal) Bruno Saraiva (Feb 8, 2017 – Nov, 2017)
- (Portugal) Nilton Terroso (Nov 22, 2017 – June, 2018)
- (Portugal) Ivo Soares (July, 2018 – Feb, 2019)
- (Portugal) Vasco Faísca (Feb 5, 2019 – Dec 26, 2019)
- (Portugal) Bruno Ribeiro (Dec 31, 2019 – Feb 24, 2020)
- (Portugal) Filipe Moreira (Feb 25, 2020 – June 30, 2020)
- (Portugal) José Carvalho Araújo (July 9, 2020 – Dec 29, 2020)
- (Netherlands) Edgar Davids (Jan 4, 2021 – Jul 19, 2021)
- (Italy) Carlo Perrone (Jul 24, 2021 – Apr 20, 2022)
- (Portugal) Jorge Dias Viegas (Apr 20, 2022 – Nov 8, 2022)
- (Portugal) Hélio Pinto (Nov 8, 2022 – Present)
