= Portimonense S.C. =

Portuguese professional football club

Portimonense
- Full name: Portimonense Sporting Clube
- Nicknames: Alvinegros; Marafados
- Founded: 14 August 1914; 112 years ago
- Ground: Estádio Municipal, Portimão, Algarve, Portugal
- Capacity: 4,961
- President: Rodiney Sampaio
- Head coach: Alex Costa
- League: Liga Portugal 2
- 2025–26: Liga Portugal 2, 15th of 18
- Website: www.portimonense.pt
Home colours	Away colours	Third colours

Portimonense Sporting Clube is a Portuguese sports club based in Portimão. Founded on 14 August 1914, it is most notable for its professional football team, which currently plays in the Liga Portugal 2, the second division of Portuguese football. It also fields various youth teams and a veterans team in football, as well as teams in basketball.

Located in Algarve's second largest city, its stadium, the Estádio Municipal de Portimão, has a capacity of 4,961 spectators after undergoing renovation in early 2011. The club has never won any major trophies, but it participated in the Primeira Liga for several seasons.

Portimonense's zenith was in the 1980s, a decade in which the club only played its football in the top division, also competing in the UEFA Cup in 1985–86. They have reached the semi-finals of the Taça de Portugal three times, in 1983, 1987 and 1988.

== History ==
Portimonense was a regular presence in the Portuguese first division, even finishing fifth in 1984–85 – highlights included 0–0 home draws against Benfica and Sporting CP – which led to participation in the UEFA Cup in the 1985–86 season. The team were eliminated in the first round of that competition by FK Partizan of Yugoslavia.

In the 1990s and 2000s, however, the club primarily played in the Segunda Liga, while also having a brief spell in the third level. In 2009–10, Portimonense started with Angolan Lito Vidigal at the helm, but when he left for União de Leiria, former Sporting midfielder Litos took charge, and led the team to a final second place, behind S.C. Beira-Mar, thus returning it to the top flight after exactly 20 years of absence; substitute Wilson Eduardo scored the only goal away to U.D. Oliveirense to guarantee the promotion.

Midway through the 2010–11 campaign, Litos was fired due to bad results, as Portimonense eventually ranked second from bottom and was relegated back. The team met the same fate in the following season, even managing to rank in a worse position; however, after Varzim S.C. was not allowed to promote from division three due to financial irregularities, Portimonense was reinstated.

Portimonense won the 2016–17 LigaPro to return to the top flight after six years; the campaign was managed by Vítor Oliveira, who had begun his coaching career with the club three decades earlier and had won promotion for the fifth consecutive time. The team went down on the last day of the 2019–20 season, as competitors C.D. Tondela and Vitória de Setúbal also won their games, however, Portimonense remained in the division due to issues off the pitch at both Vitória de Setúbal and C.D. Aves meaning these two were relegated and the Algarve side would stay up.

== Players ==
=== Current squad ===
As of 18 September 2026

Note: Flags indicate national team as defined under FIFA eligibility rules; some limited exceptions apply. Players may hold more than one non-FIFA nationality.

No.	Pos.	Nation	Player
1	GK	GER	Dudu (on loan from Estrela da Amadora)
2	DF	BRA	Edney Silva (on loan from Santa Clara)
3	DF	BRA	Jarleysom
4	DF	BRA	Italo Cabelinho (on loan from Santa Clara)
5	DF	RUS	Georgiy Tunguliyadi
6	DF	ANG	Samy
7	FW	GBS	Dânio Djassi
8	MF	POR	João Casimiro
9	FW	FRA	Samuel Yépié Yépié
10	MF	JPN	Shōya Nakajima
11	FW	POR	Dudá
15	MF	BRA	Xavier
17	DF	POR	João Reis
18	MF	POR	Tiago Mamede
19	FW	GBS	Midana Cassamá

No.	Pos.	Nation	Player
20	MF	NGR	Caleb Okereke
21	MF	POR	Yanis da Rocha
23	GK	FRA	Sébastien Cibois
25	FW	BRA	Ericson (on loan from Retrô)
36	DF	BRA	Thauan Lara
38	MF	BRA	Wermeson (on loan from Camboriú)
44	GK	POR	Lagartinho
65	GK	BRA	Wellington Santana
70	FW	POR	Gonçalo Águas
73	DF	POR	Marlon Jr.
77	FW	BRA	João Mendes
79	FW	POR	Paulinho Campos
80	MF	BRA	Felipe Favero (on loan from Grêmio Prudente)
88	MF	BRA	Jader (on loan from Santa Clara)
93	FW	BRA	Welinton Júnior

=== Out on loan ===
Note: Flags indicate national team as defined under FIFA eligibility rules; some limited exceptions apply. Players may hold more than one non-FIFA nationality.

No.	Pos.	Nation	Player
30	FW	KOR	Kim Yong-hak (at Pohang Steelers until 31 December 2026)

== Notable players ==
- (Portugal) Rui Águas
- (Portugal) José Carlos

== Statistics ==
=== Most appearances ===
As of 23 January 2025

Rank	Player	Appearances	Goals
1	(Portugal) Ricardo Pessoa	426	50
2	(Portugal) Rúben Fernandes	267	24
3	(Brazil) Fabrício	248	51
4	(Portugal) Ricardo Ferreira	231	0
5	(Portugal) Skoda	225	15
6	(Brazil) Ewerton	219	18
7	(Brazil) Lucas Possignolo	209	12
8	(Portugal) Pires	206	62
9	(Portugal) Pedro Sá	192	3
10	(Brazil) Dener	190	27

=== Top goalscorers ===
As of 23 January 2025

Rank	Player	Appearances	Goals
1	(Portugal) Pires	206	62
2	(Brazil) Fabrício	248	51
3	(Portugal) Ricardo Pessoa	426	50
4	(Cape Verde) Artur Jorge Vicente	141	40
5	(Belgium) Serge Cadorin	78	36
6	(Portugal) Rui Loja	86	35
7	(Bulgaria) Plamen Getov	72	34
8	(Brazil) Dener	190	27
9	(Portugal) Zambujo	188	26
10	(Portugal) Rúben Fernandes	267	24

== League and cup history ==
Season	Ti.	Pos.	Pl.	W	D	L	GS	GA	P	Cup	League Cup	Europe	Notes
1976–77	1D	12	30	8	9	13	34	46	25	Round 3			
1977–78	1D	13	30	8	7	15	29	39	23	Round 4			Relegated
1978–79	2D	1	30	19	9	8	66	17	47	Round 2			Promoted
1979–80	1D	8	30	10	6	14	32	49	26	Round 4			
1980–81	1D	8	30	11	6	13	34	37	28	Round 4			
1981–82	1D	6	30	12	8	10	35	24	32	Round 4			
1982–83	1D	9	30	11	7	12	35	31	29	Semi-finals			
1983–84	1D	10	30	10	6	14	27	37	26	Round 4			
1984–85	1D	5	30	14	8	8	51	41	36	Round 4			^{[A]}
1985–86	1D	7	30	11	6	13	29	32	28	Round 5		Round 1	
1986–87	1D	11	30	8	10	12	27	47	26	Semi-finals			
1987–88	1D	13	38	12	10	16	35	50	34	Semi-finals			
1988–89	1D	12	38	12	11	15	33	37	35	Round 4			
1989–90	1D	17	34	7	7	20	30	57	21	Round 3			Relegated
1990–91	2H	8	38	18	6	14	57	34	42	Round 7			
1991–92	2H	17	34	7	10	17	34	59	24	Round 4			Relegated
1992–93	2DS	1	34	20	11	3	62	27	51	Round 3			Promoted
1993–94	2H	12	34	11	8	15	44	47	30	Round 4			
1994–95	2H	16	34	11	6	17	35	48	28	Round 4			Relegated
1995–96	2DS	6	34	12	10	12	34	42	46	Round 6			
1996–97	2DS	12	34	13	7	14	44	41	46	Round 6			
1997–98	2DS	8	34	16	5	13	47	35	53	Round 2			
1998–99	2DS	3	34	15	14	5	58	30	59	Round 5			
1999–2000	2DS	2	38	21	10	7	80	40	73	Round 4			
2000–01	2DS	1	38	25	3	10	70	43	78	Round 3			Promoted
2001–02	2H	6	34	13	13	8	44	37	52	Quarter-finals			
2002–03	2H	6	34	14	9	11	50	40	51	Round 3			
2003–04	2H	16	34	8	15	11	36	39	39	Round 6			
2004–05	2H	14	34	10	9	15	40	49	39	Round 3			
2005–06	2H	12	34	10	13	11	36	36	43	Round 4			
2006–07	2H	14	30	7	9	14	28	42	30	Round 4			
2007–08	2H	11	30	8	13	9	26	30	37	Round 4	Round 4		
2008–09	2H	13	30	7	14	9	29	35	35	Round 5	Round 1		
2009–10	2H	2	30	16	6	8	43	34	54	Round 3	First Group Stage		Promoted
2010–11	1D	15	30	6	7	17	28	49	25	Round 4	Round 1		Relegated
2011–12	2H	16	30	8	8	14	35	42	32	Round 3	Second Group Stage		^{[B]}
2012–13	2H	6	42	17	13	12	61	50	64	Round 3	First Group Stage		
2013–14	2H	7	42	19	10	13	58	48	67	Round 3	Round 2		
2014–15	2H	14	46	15	15	16	56	62	60	Round 1	Round 1		
2015-16	2H	4	46	20	18	8	57	45	78	Round 5	Semi-finals		
2016-17	2H	1	42	25	8	9	70	39	83	Round 2	Round 1		Segunda Liga Champion
2017-18	1D	10	34	10	8	16	52	60	38	Round 4	Group Stage		
2018-19	1D	12	34	11	6	17	44	59	39	Round 3	Round 2		
2019-20	1D	17	34	7	12	15	30	45	33	Round 3	Group Stage		Relegated but reinstated
2020-21	1D	14	34	9	8	17	34	41	35	3.ª Elim.	DNP		
2021-22	1D	13	34	10	8	16	31	45	38	Quarter-Finals	Round 2		
2022-23	1D	15	34	10	4	20	25	48	34	Third Round	Group Stage		
2023-24	1D	16	34	8	8	18	39	72	32	Fourth Round	Round 2		Relegated via Play-Off
2024-25	2D	15	34	9	7	18	25	34	34	Third Round	DNP		

A. ^A Best league classification finish in the club's history.
B. ^B Despite finishing in a position which would relegate the club to the third division, Portimonense were reinstated in the Liga de Honra due to Varzim not meeting the financial requirements to play in the league.

Last updated: 25 September 2014

Div. = Division; 1D = Portuguese League; 2H = Liga de Honra; 2DS/2D = Portuguese Second Division

Ti. = Tier; Pos. = Position; Pl = Match played; W = Win; D = Draw; L = Lost; GS = Goal scored; GA = Goal against; P = Points

== Honours ==
- LigaPro: 2016–17
- Portuguese Second Division: 1978–79, 2000–01

=== Europe ===
1985–86 UEFA Cup – 1st Round
Date	Home	Result	Away	City
18/09/1985	(Portugal) Portimonense	1–0	(Socialist Federal Republic of Yugoslavia) Partizan	Portimão
2/10/1985	(Socialist Federal Republic of Yugoslavia) Partizan	4–0	(Portugal) Portimonense	Belgrade

== Club officials ==
On 13 July 2011, Portimonense elected its body of officials, for a three-year term.

- President: José Fernando Teixeira da Rocha
- Deputy president: António Alexandre Soares Rocha da Silveira
- Vice-presidents: Luís Manuel de Andrade Rodrigues Batalau, José Cândido Rebelo Rodrigues, Nuno Miguel Lopes da Silva, João Carlos Pinhota Martins Santana, Francisco José de Matos Viegas Gouveia Coutinho, Luís Carlos da Costa Paiva

== Managerial history ==
Dates	Name
1985–1986	(Portugal) Vítor Oliveira
1988–1989	(Portugal) José Torres
1990–1991	(Portugal) Carlos Alhinho
1991–1994	(Portugal) Amílcar Fonseca
1994–1995	(Portugal) José Torres
1995–1997	(Portugal) Amílcar Fonseca
1999–2001	(Portugal) Mário Nunes
2001–2002	(Portugal) Amílcar Fonseca
2003–2004	(Portugal) Dito
2004–2005	(Portugal) António Pacheco
2005–2006	(Portugal) Diamantino Miranda
2006–2007	(Portugal) Luís Martins
2007–2009	(Portugal) Vítor Pontes
2009	(Angola) Lito Vidigal
2009–2010	(Portugal) Litos
2010–2011	(Portugal) Carlos Azenha
2012–2014	(Angola) Lázaro Oliveira
2014–2015	(Portugal) Vítor Maçãs
2015–2016	(Portugal) José Augusto
2016–2018	(Portugal) Vítor Oliveira
2018–2020	(Portugal) António Folha
2020–2024	(Portugal) Paulo Sérgio
2024–2025	(Portugal) Ricardo Pessoa
2025–present	(Portugal) Tiago Fernandes

== Futsal ==
Portimonense has a futsal team that plays top tier futsal in the Liga Sport Zone.

== Basketball ==
Portimonense has a basketball team that plays in the Proliga (Portugal) basketball league.

== Supporters and rivalries ==
Portimonense has its own club song: "Portimonense, expoente algarvio". Unlike many other football clubs, the supporters own and operate Portimonense, although this is more common in Iberia than in much of Europe.

The club has rivalries with fellow Algarve clubs Farense and Olhanense.
