= S.C. Farense =

Portuguese association football club

Farense
- Full name: Sporting Clube Farense
- Nickname: Leões de Faro (Lions of Faro)
- Founded: 1 April 1910; 116 years ago
- Ground: Estádio de São Luís
- Capacity: 7,000
- President: João Rodrigues
- Head coach: José Faria
- League: Liga Portugal 2
- 2025–26: Liga Portugal 2, 16th of 18
- Website: www.scfarense.pt
Home colours	Away colours

Sporting Clube Farense, simply known as Farense, is a Portuguese professional football club based in Faro in the district of the same name and the region of Algarve. Founded in 1910, the club currently plays in the Liga Portugal 2.

== History ==
Founded on 1 April 1910, it became the branch number 2 of Sporting Clube de Portugal (Sporting CP). Its main kit was inspired by the classic Sporting CP Stromp kit which was the main kit of the Lisbon-based team until 1928. In its entire history, the club has won nine major trophies: the AF Algarve Championship five times, the Segunda Divisão twice, and the Terceira Divisão and AF Algarve First and Second Divisions once each. Aside from its major trophies, the club as of 2013, has played 23 seasons in the Primeira Liga of which their highest league table classification came in the 1994–95 season where they managed a fifth-place finish.

On the back of that best-ever finish, Farense qualified for the UEFA Cup for the first time, losing in the first round to Olympique Lyonnais by a single goal in each game. The club also reached the final of the Taça de Portugal in 1990 where they lost to Estrela da Amadora. Among the mainstays of their 1990s teams were the Moroccan attacking duo of Hajry Redouane and Hassan Nader.

The 2001–02 season saw the club relegated to the second tier of Portuguese football. In 2006, the club was in the sixth tier, the second district league of the Algarve Football Association, but won two consecutive promotions as champions. In 2012–13 they were promoted to the Segunda Liga. In 2019–20, after the season was curtailed due to the COVID-19 pandemic, the club were promoted back to the top flight after 18 years, under manager Sérgio Vieira. One year later, they were relegated on the final matchday after a 4–0 loss at C.D. Santa Clara.

On 3 February 2023, Farense sacked manager Vasco Faísca before a match against Estrela da Amadora, who had cut their advantage in second place to one point. His replacement José Mota led the club back to the Primeira Liga. He was fired after a poor start to the Primeira Liga and replaced by Tozé on September 25th, 2024.

== Stadium ==
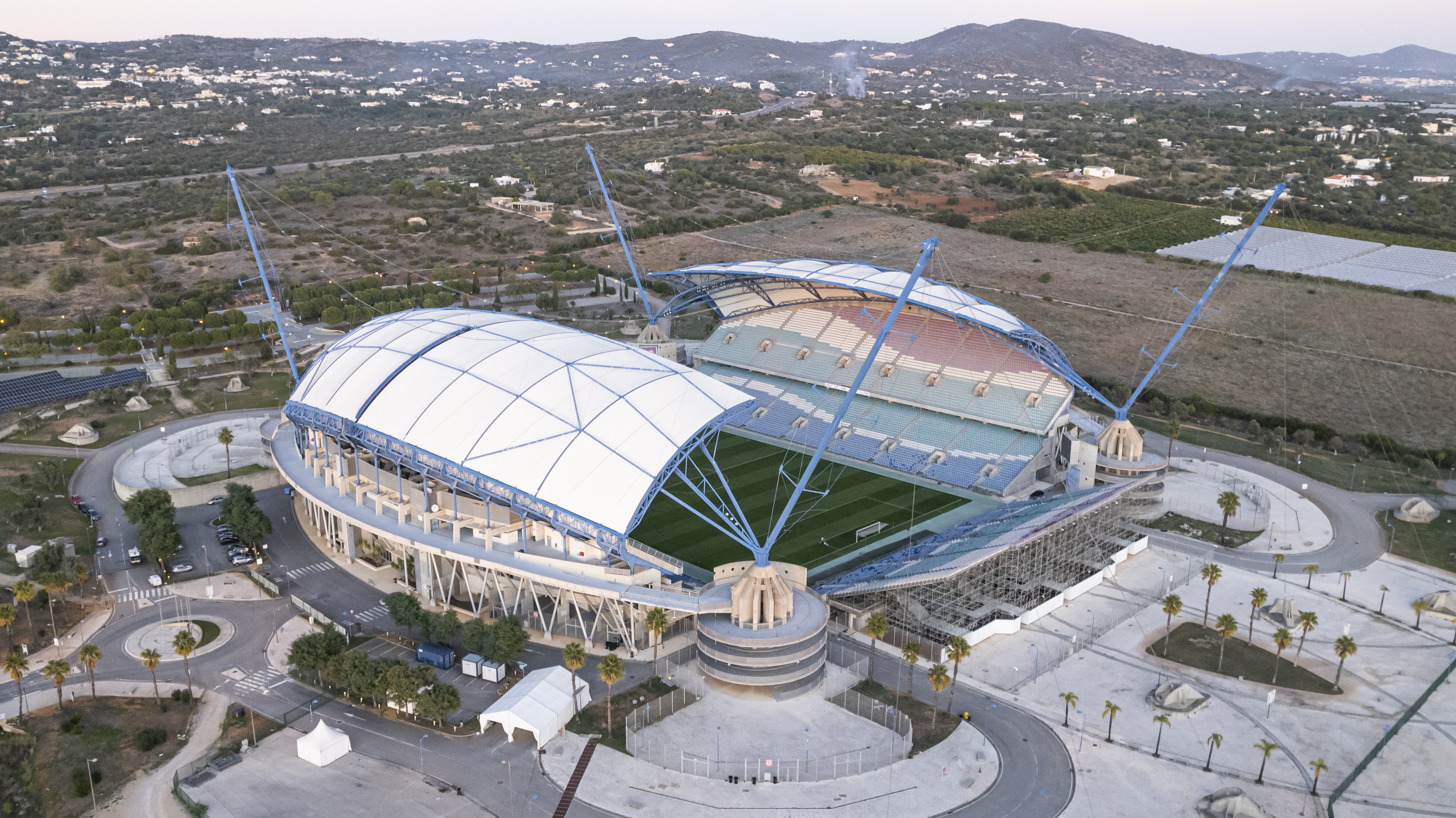
Estádio Algarve – View from the south side of the stadium.

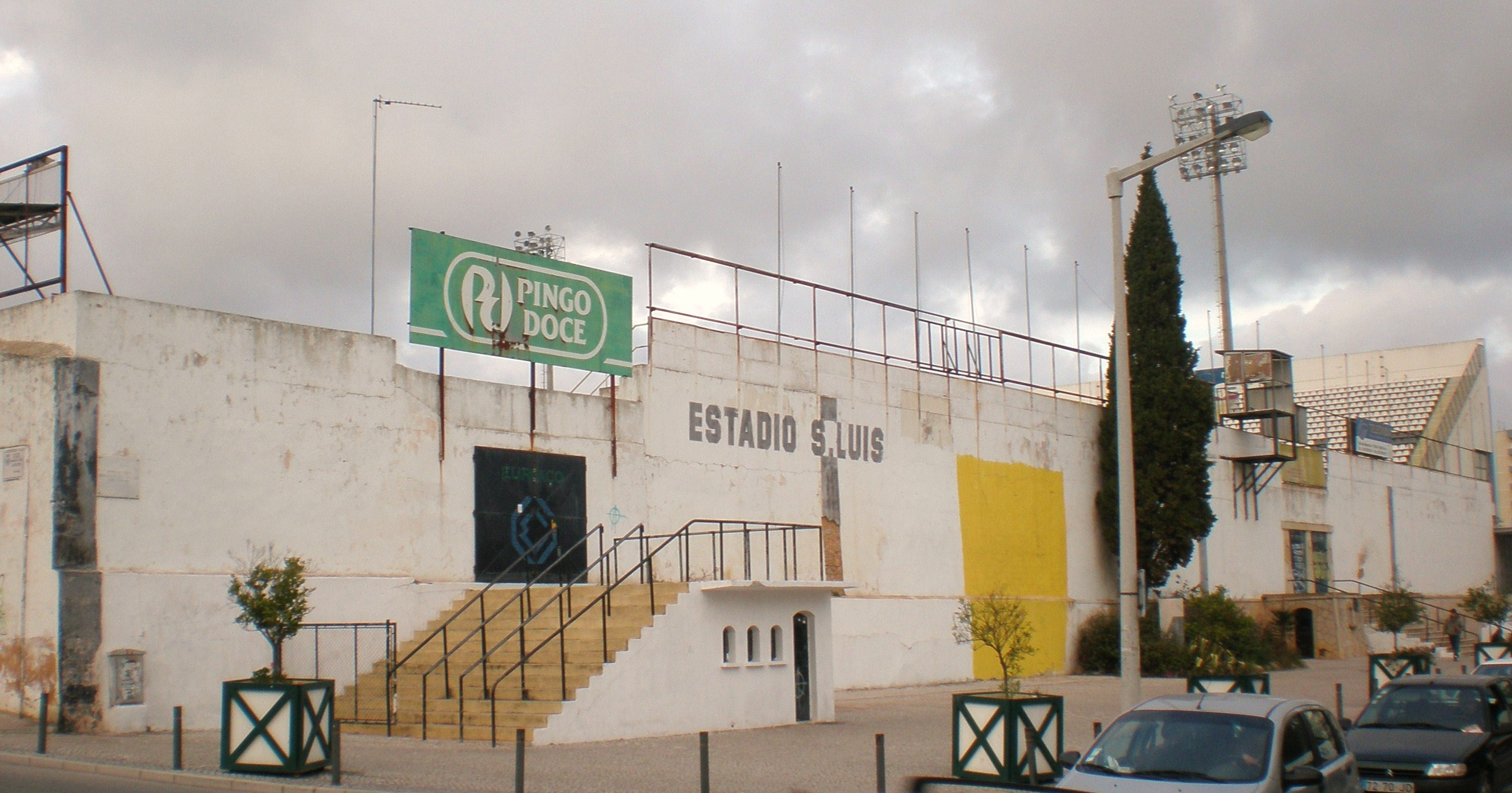
Estádio de São Luís – Current stadium in 2008, before the most recent renovation.

The Leões de Faro played at the Estádio de São Luís for 94 years from 1910. The club moved stadium in 2004 to the newly constructed Estádio Algarve which was built for the purpose of hosting matches at UEFA Euro 2004. The Faro side moved back to the Estádio de São Luís in 2013 after it gained promotion to the Segunda Liga. As a result of their promotion, the Estádio de São Luís underwent major renovations to improve its facilities.

== Rivalries ==
The club has rivalries with fellow Algarve clubs S.C. Olhanense and Portimonense S.C.

== Players ==
=== Current squad ===
As of 16 September 2026

Note: Flags indicate national team as defined under FIFA eligibility rules; some limited exceptions apply. Players may hold more than one non-FIFA nationality.

No.	Pos.	Nation	Player
1	GK	SWE	Jakob Tånnander
3	DF	POR	Lucas D'Agrella
5	DF	POR	Rodrigo Borges
6	DF	BRA	Derick Poloni
7	FW	POR	João Resende
8	MF	POR	Miguel Menino
9	FW	BRA	Gabriel Barbosa
10	MF	NZL	Sarpreet Singh
11	FW	POR	Nélson Oliveira
15	MF	ANG	Joseph Nduquidi
17	FW	POR	André Candeias
18	FW	POR	Cuba
19	FW	SWE	Leonardo Oliveira
22	DF	ESP	Toni Herrero

No.	Pos.	Nation	Player
27	MF	BRA	Mattheus Oliveira
29	MF	BRA	Claudio Falcão
37	DF	POR	Gonçalo Silva
36	DF	POR	Bernardo Antunes
42	DF	POR	Rodrigo Laranjeira
43	DF	POR	Dário Miranda
44	DF	BIH	Nermin Zolotić
50	GK	BRA	Kauã Paes
70	FW	BRA	Victor Barbara
78	DF	POR	Alex Pinto
88	MF	POR	Rafinha
89	FW	ANG	João Gastão (on loan from Estrela da Amadora)
97	GK	CRO	Fabijan Buntić

=== Out on loan ===
Note: Flags indicate national team as defined under FIFA eligibility rules; some limited exceptions apply. Players may hold more than one non-FIFA nationality.

No. / Pos. / Nation / Player; — / MF / POR / Gio Almeida (at Mérida until 30 June 2027)	No. / Pos. / Nation / Player; — / FW / CIV / Balla Sangaré (at Al-Okhdood until 30 June 2027)

=== Notable former players ===
Players that have played more than 50 league matches:

- (Portugal) Bruno Alves
- (Portugal) Carlos Fernandes
- (Portugal) Hélder Baptista
- (Portugal) Hélder Rosário
- (Portugal) Jacques Pereira
- (Portugal) João Fajardo
- (Portugal) João Oliveira Pinto
- (Portugal) Jorge Jesus
- (Portugal) Jorge Martins
- (Portugal) Manuel Cajuda
- (Portugal) Manuel José
- (Portugal) Quim
- (Portugal) Ricardo Vaz Tê
- (Portugal) Rui Esteves
- (Portugal) Skoda
- (Portugal) Tozé
- (Portugal) Tulipa
- (Portugal) Zé Tó
- (Bosnia and Herzegovina) Nail Beširović
- (Brazil) Zé Carlos
- (Brazil) Marco Aurélio
- (Brazil) King
- (Cape Verde) Pelé
- (England) Laurence Batty
- (England) Peter Barnes
- (England) Peter Eastoe
- (France) Ted Kelton Agasson
- (Greece) Dimitrios Konstantopoulos
- (Hungary) Ferenc Mészáros
- (Morocco) Hajry Redouane
- (Morocco) Hassan Nader
- (Mozambique) Carlos Fumo
- (Nigeria) Henry Makinwa
- (Nigeria) Peter Rufai
- (Nigeria) Uche Okafor
- (Romania) Lucian Marinescu
- (Russia) Ilshat Faizulin
- (Scotland) Ryan Gauld
- (Serbia) Dragan Punišić
- (Serbia) Goran Stevanović
- (Serbia) Milonja Đukić
- (Zaire) Tueba Menayane
- (Zambia) Perry Mutapa
- (Malta) Zach Muscat

== Statistics ==
=== Most appearances ===
As of 23 January 2025

Rank	Player	Appearances	Goals
1	(Morocco) Hajry Redouane	292	33
2	(Portugal) Carlos Costa	273	23
3	(Morocco) Hassan Nader	246	99
4	(Portugal) Eugénio	244	4
5	(Portugal) Miguel Serôdio	214	3
6	(Brazil) Fabrício Isidoro	207	16
7	(Brazil) Luizão	197	10
8	(Socialist Federal Republic of Yugoslavia) (Federal Republic of Yugoslavia) Milonja Đukić	187	31
9	(Brazil) Sérgio Duarte	184	11
10	(Brazil) Pitico	169	23

=== Top goalscorers ===
As of 23 January 2025

Rank	Player	Appearances	Goals
1	(Morocco) Hassan Nader	246	99
2	(Brazil) Mirobaldo	131	44
3	(Nigeria) Christian Irobiso	151	34
4	(Morocco) Hajry Redouane	292	33
5	(Socialist Federal Republic of Yugoslavia) (Federal Republic of Yugoslavia) Milonja Đukić	187	31
6	(Brazil) Pedro Henrique	97	30
7	(Brazil) Farias	84	23
7	(Brazil) Pitico	169	23
7	(Portugal) Carlos Costa	273	23
10	(Portugal) Fábio Gomes	61	22
10	(Portugal) Ademar	148	22

== Managerial history ==
- (Portugal) José Augusto (1987–1989)
- (England) Malcolm Allison (1989)
- (Spain) Paco Fortes (1989–1998)
- (Portugal) João Alves (1998–2000)
- (Portugal) Nicolau Vaqueiro (2000)
- (Portugal) Manuel Balela (Jun 14, 2000 – May 27, 2001)
- (Spain) Alberto Pazos (Jun 7, 2001 – Nov 27, 2001)
- (Morocco) Hajry Redouane (Nov 28, 2001 – Dec 4, 2001)
- (Portugal) Jorge Castelo (Dec 4, 2001 – Mar 18, 2002)
- (Spain) Paco Fortes (Mar 18, 2002 – Dec 3, 2002)
- (Portugal) Manuel Balela (Dec 4, 2002 – Mar 8, 2003)
- (Morocco) Hajry Redouane (Mar 8, 2003 – Jun 1, 2003)
- (Portugal) Manuel Balela (2003 –2004)
- (Portugal) Joaquim Sequeira (2004 – Jan 3, 2005)
- (Portugal) Manuel Balela (Jan 3, 2005 – May 5, 2005)
- (Morocco) Hassan Nader (May 5, 2005 – 2006)
- (Portugal) Carlos Costa (Sep 30, 2006 – Feb 4, 2008)
- (Portugal) Jorge Portela (Feb 6, 2008 – Aug 31, 2008)
- (Portugal) Ivo Soares (Sep 2, 2008 – Nov 18, 2008)
- (Portugal) António Barão (Nov 18, 2008 – Jun 7, 2009)
- (Brazil) Edinho (Jul 16, 2009 – Dec 22, 2009)
- (Portugal) Rui Esteves (Dec 22, 2009 – Mar 16, 2010)
- (Portugal) Joaquim Mendes (Mar 16, 2010 – Nov 29, 2010)
- (Portugal) Joaquim Sequeira (Nov 29, 2010 – Dec 29, 2010)
- (Portugal) João de Deus (Jan 2, 2011 – Apr 30, 2011)
- (Portugal) Manuel Balela (2011 – May 30, 2012)
- (Portugal) Bruno Ribeiro (June 2, 2012 – Jan 15, 2013)
- (Portugal) Mauro de Brito (Jan 2013 – Sept 9, 2013)
- (Portugal) Jorge Paixão (Sept 13, 2013 – Feb 25, 2014)
- (Portugal) Antero Afonso (Feb 25, 2014 – Jun 2, 2014)
- (Portugal) Pedro Correia (Jun 2, 2014 – Nov 24, 2014)
- (Portugal) Abel Xavier (Dec 2, 2014 – May 28, 2015)
- (Portugal) Jorge Paixão (Jun 6, 2015 – Dec 14, 2015)
- (Portugal) Horácio Gonçalves (Dec 14, 2015 – Apr 7, 2016)
- (Portugal) Antero Afonso (Apr 7, 2016 – Jul 22, 2016)
- (Angola) Lázaro Oliveira (Jul 22, 2016 – Apr 3, 2017)
- (Portugal) Rui Duarte (Apr 3, 2017 – Feb 5, 2019)
- (Portugal) Álvaro Magalhães (Fev 5, 2019 – May 22, 2019)
- (Portugal) Sérgio Vieira (May 22, 2019 – Feb 1, 2021)
- (Portugal) Jorge Costa (Feb 4, 2021 – Aug 30, 2021)
- (Portugal) Fanã (Aug 31, 2021 – Dec 19, 2021)
- (Portugal) Vasco Faísca (Dec 19, 2021 – Feb 6, 2023)
- (Portugal) José Mota (Feb 6, 2023 – Sep 24, 2024)
- (Portugal) Tozé (Sep 25, 2024;– May 29, 2025)
- (Portugal) Silas (Jul 1, 2025;– )

== Honours ==
- Segunda Divisão: 1939–40, 1982–83
- Terceira Divisão: 2011–12
- AF Algarve Championship: 1914–15, 1917–18, 1933–34, 1935–36, 1937–38
- AF Algarve First Division: 2007–08
- AF Algarve Second Division: 2006–07

== Youth honours ==
- AF Algarve U23 Championship: 2020–21
- AF Algarve Juniores B First Division (U17): 2018–19, 2019–20
- AF Algarve Juniores C First Division (U15): 2012–2013

== European cup history ==
- Q = Qualifying
- PO = Play-off

UEFA Cup

Season	Round	Country	Club	Home	Away	Aggregate
1995–96	R1	(France)	Olympique Lyonnais	0–1	0–1	0–2

== League and cup history ==
Season	Tier	Pos.	Pl.	W	D	L	GS	GA	P	Cup	League Cup	Notes
1989–90	2	1	34	25	5	4	80	23	55	Runners-up		Promoted
1990–91	1	11	38	14	6	18	46	47	34	Round 6		
1991–92	1	6	34	12	11	11	35	33	35	Round 5		
1992–93	1	6	34	11	13	10	41	36	35	Round 5		
1993–94	1	8	34	13	7	14	44	46	33	Round 4		
1994–95	1	5	34	16	5	13	44	38	37	Round 6		
1995–96	1	13	34	10	6	18	36	45	36	Round 6		
1996–97	1	11	34	10	12	12	34	34	42	Round 4		
1997–98	1	14	34	8	13	13	41	50	37	Round 4		
1998–99	1	11	34	10	9	15	39	54	39	Round 5		
1999–2000	1	14	34	8	11	15	35	60	35	Round 5		
2000–01	1	13	34	10	9	15	37	47	39	Round 6		
2001–02	1	17	38	7	7	20	29	63	28	Round 5		Relegated
2002–03	2	12	34	11	11	12	32	32	44	Round 4		Relegated
2003–04	3	14	34	11	8	15	41	49	41	Round 3		
2004–05	4	14	34	11	8	15	41	49	41	Round 1		
2005–06	4	–	–	–	–	–	–	–	–	Round 1		Relegated
2006–07	6	1	31	24	6	1	72	15	78			Promoted
2007–08	5	1	30	22	4	4	73	20	70			Promoted
2008–09	4	4	26	12	6	8	40	35	42	Round 1		
2009–10	4	4	22	9	9	4	31	22	36	Round 1		Promoted
2010–11	3	12	30	8	12	10	28	37	36	Round 3		Relegated
2011–12	4	1	22	17	5	0	52	17	56	Round 1		Promoted
2012–13	3	1	30	19	8	3	38	21	65	Round 4		Promoted
2013–14	2	10	42	15	12	15	45	44	57	Round 3	Round 2	
2014–15	2	11	46	16	14	16	51	54	62	Round 2	Round 1	
2015–16	2	20	46	15	11	20	49	56	54	Round 4	Round 1	Relegated
2016–17	3	3	32	18	8	6	54	22	62	Round 3		
2017–18	3	2	35	28	4	3	74	18	81	Round 6		Promoted
2018–19	2	10	34	11	10	13	39	35	43	Round 3	Round 2	
2019–20	2	2	24	15	3	6	35	22	48	Round 4	Round 1	Promoted, LigaPro suspended due to COVID-19 pandemic in Portugal
2020–21	1	17	34	7	10	17	31	48	31	Round 3		Relegated
2021–22	2	11	34	10	11	13	40	42	41	Round 4	Round 2	
2022–23	2	2	33	20	6	7	54	33	66	Round 4	Group Stage	Promoted
