= 1985–86 S.L. Benfica season =

Benfica
1985–86 season
- President: Fernando Martins
- Head coach: John Mortimore
- Stadium: Estádio da Luz
- Primeira Divisão: 2nd
- Taça de Portugal: Winners
- Cup Winners' Cup: Second round
- Supertaça Cândido de Oliveira: Winners
- Top goalscorer: League: Manniche (14); All: Manniche (21)
Home colours

The 1985–86 season was Sport Lisboa e Benfica's 82nd season in existence and the club's 52nd consecutive season in the top flight of Portuguese football, covering the period from 1 July 1985 to 30 June 1986. Benfica competed domestically in the Primeira Divisão, Taça de Portugal and the Supertaça Cândido de Oliveira, and participated in the Cup Winners' Cup after winning the Taça de Portugal in the previous season.

In the new season, John Mortimore replaced Pál Csernai after the Hungarian underperformed at the helm. Only major signing was Rui Águas, but Benfica fought to kept a trio composed of Carlos Manuel, Diamantino Miranda and José Luís from leaving. In the league, Benfica started in erratic shape but quickly settled and racked up several consecutive wins. They ended 1985 in first place and having the Supertaça Cândido de Oliveira, their second Supertaça. In the first months of new year, Benfica kept their first place, while knocking out Porto and Sporting from the Portuguese Cup. In April, the season took a dramatic turn when Benfica lost at home to Sporting and were matched in first place by Porto, who confirmed their title a week later. Nonetheless, Benfica finished the month by lifting their 20th Taça de Portugal against Belenenses.

== Season summary ==
Benfica started the new season with a change in leadership. The performance under Pál Csernai in 1984–85 was disappointing, so it was only expectable that he would be replaced. In late April, John Mortimore, was selected as his replacement. The club made some adjustments in the transfer window but the biggest signing was Rui Águas. The summer story instead revolved around the contract extensions for Carlos Manuel, Diamantino Miranda and José Luís. Particularly, Carlos Manuel, who was rumoured to move to Braga. In July, all three agreed terms and signed their extensions, ending the impasse. The pre-season began on 11 July, with three preparation games scheduled for late July. Benfica then took part in the regional Taça de Honra and in the Lisbon International Tournament, winning both.

The league campaign started with the Clássico with Porto, with Benfica losing 2–0. The next week, Benfica defeated Marítimo by 9–0, and then lost again, now with Vitória de Guimarães. They followed that with a draw against Vitória de Setúbal. On the third weekend of September, Benfica opened the new third tier of Estádio da Luz, taking advantage of the week off from the first round of the Cup Winners' Cup. Because of the Heysel Stadium disaster, their opponent, Manchester United was banned. In October, in their debut in Europe, Benfica eliminated Sampdoria. Domestically, the league had much improve and by 25 November, Benfica was only a point shy of first place. In early December, Benfica drew in Antas and won their second Supertaça Cândido de Oliveira, after having previously beat them by one-nil at home. On 21 December, Benfica drew with Sporting, which levelled the Big Three at the top with 22 points. Closing the year, Benfica defeated Boavista and lapped the first round of the league in first place, after recovering five points since September.

After an event-less January, in which Benfica retained their one-point lead over Sporting; in February, Benfica faced Porto again, this time for the round of 16 of the Taça de Portugal, winning 2–1. Meanwhile, in the Primeira Divisão, they added another point in their lead over their closest competitors. In March, Benfica was eliminated of the Cup Winners' Cup by Dukla Prague, while in the Portuguese Cup, they thrashed Sporting by 5–0 in the quarter-finals. They finished the month with a replay of the match with Salgueiros, which had been postponed in February because of the pitch conditions. They drew 1–1 and lost points in title race.

In April, Benfica received Sporting in what was labelled the D-Day for the league. Despite leading the league for most of second round, they lost 2–1, which allowed Porto to catch them in the first place, with a better head-to-head record. Mortimore said: "Sporting had two chances and converted them both, we had lost the league". On the last day of the campaign, Porto beat last classified, Sporting da Covilhã and won the league, while Benfica lost in Bessa with Boavista. Benfica reacted in the best way and qualified for the Taça de Portugal final, where they defeated Belenenses to lift their 20th Taça de Portugal. After the win, Manuel Bento said: "The bastards won the Cup after all". He also approached the loss of the league title with: "forces too powerful took away our title."

== Competitions ==
Win Draw Loss Postponed

=== Overall record ===
Competition	First match	Last match	Record								
Competition	First match	Last match	G	W	D	L	GF	GA	GD	Win %	Source
Primeira Divisão	24 August 1985	20 April 1986	30	21	5	4	54	13	+41	70.00	
Taça de Portugal	17 November 1985	27 April 1986	8	7	1	0	26	2	+24	87.50	
European Cup Winners' Cup	23 October 1985	19 March 1986	4	2	0	2	4	3	+1	50.00	
Supertaça Cândido de Oliveira	20 November 1985	4 December 1985	2	1	1	0	1	0	+1	50.00	
Total			44	31	7	6	85	18	+67	70.45	

=== Supertaça Cândido de Oliveira ===
20 November 1985 First leg	Benfica	1–0	Porto	Lisbon
20:00	Diamantino 38'	Report		Stadium: Estádio da Luz; Referee: João Rosa

4 December 1985 Second leg	Porto	0–0	Benfica	Porto
19:00		Report		Stadium: Estádio das Antas; Referee: Fortunato Azevedo

=== Primeira Divisão ===
==== League table ====
Pos	Team	Pld	W	D	L	GF	GA	GD	Pts	Qualification or relegation
1	Porto (C)	30	22	5	3	64	20	+44	49	Qualification to European Cup first round
2	Benfica	30	21	5	4	54	13	+41	47	Qualification to Cup Winners' Cup first round (Note: Benfica qualified for the Cup Winners' Cup as Portuguese Cup winners)
3	Sporting CP	30	20	6	4	64	20	+44	46	Qualification to UEFA Cup first round
4	Vitória de Guimarães	30	16	8	6	51	29	+22	40	Qualification to UEFA Cup first round
5	Boavista	30	14	8	8	44	29	+15	36	Qualification to UEFA Cup first round

Source: RSSSF
(C) Champions

==== Results by round ====
Round	1	2	3	4	5	6	7	8	9	10	11	12	13	14	15	16	17	18	19	20	21	22	23	24	25	26	27	28	29	30
Ground	A	H	A	H	A	H	H	A	H	A	H	A	H	A	H	H	A	H	A	H	A	A	H	A	H	A	H	A	H	A
Result	L	W	L	D	W	W	W	W	W	W	W	W	W	D	W	D	W	W	W	W	W	D	W	W	W	D	W	W	L	L
Position	14	7	10	9	7	6	5	4	3	3	2	2	2	2	1	2	1	1	1	1	1	1	1	1	1	1	1	1	2	2

Source: ForaDeJogo
A = Away; H = Home; W = Win; D = Draw; L = Loss

==== Matches ====
25 August 1985 1	Porto	2–0	Benfica	Porto
20:30	Juary 4'; Fernando Gomes 79'	Report		Stadium: Estádio das Antas; Referee: Carlos Valente

31 August 1985 2	Benfica	9–0	Marítimo	Lisbon
19:00	Manniche 14' (pen.), 30' (pen.); Carlos Manuel 19', 78'; José Luís 28', 59'; Diamantino 36'; Oliveira 70'; Rui Águas 81'	Report		Stadium: Estádio da Luz; Referee: Raúl Nazaré

7 September 1985 3	Vitória de Guimarães	2–1	Benfica	Guimarães
19:00	Oliveira 35' (o.g.); Roldão 52'	Report	Carlos Manuel 67'	Stadium: Estádio D. Afonso Henriques; Referee: Veiga Trigo

14 September 1985 4	Benfica	1–1	Vitória de Setúbal	Lisbon
19:30	Rui Águas 26'	Report	Fernando Cruz 87'	Stadium: Estádio da Luz; Referee: Rosa Santos

29 September 1985 5	Sporting da Covilhã	1–2	Benfica	Covilhã
19:00	Pereira 24'	Report	Carlos Manuel 2'; Shéu 30'	Stadium: Estádio Municipal José Santos Pinto; Referee: Fernando Alberto

5 October 1985 6	Benfica	2–0	Portimonense	Lisbon
20:00	Carlos Manuel 3'; Nené 80'	Report		Stadium: Estádio da Luz; Referee: Joaquim Gonçalves

19 October 1985 7	Benfica	5–0	Salgueiros	Lisbon
19:30	José Luís 18'; Nené 48', 85'; Manniche 53', 54'	Report		Stadium: Estádio da Luz; Referee: Ezequiel Feijão

27 October 1985 8	Penafiel	0–2	Benfica	Penafiel
19:00		Report	Manniche 20'; Carlos Manuel 83'	Stadium: Estádio Municipal 25 de Abril; Referee: Santos Ruivo

2 November 1985 9	Benfica	4–0	Desportivo das Aves	Lisbon
19:00	Nené 14', 44'; Manniche 19', 25'	Report	Rúben (red card) 90'	Stadium: Estádio da Luz; Referee: Manuel Correia

10 November 1985 10	Desportivo de Chaves	0–1	Benfica	Chaves
19:00		Report	Nunes 19'	Stadium: Estádio Municipal de Chaves; Referee: José Guedes

24 November 1985 11	Benfica	1–0	Braga	Lisbon
19:00	Nené 40'	Report		Stadium: Estádio da Luz; Referee: Francisco Silva

1 December 1985 12	Académica	0–1	Benfica	Coimbra
19:00		Report	Nené 47'	Stadium: Estádio Municipal de Coimbra; Referee: Crespim de Sousa

8 December 1985 13	Benfica	1–0	Belenenses	Lisbon
19:00	Canito 36' (o.g.)	Report		Stadium: Estádio da Luz; Referee: Carlos Valente

21 December 1985 14	Sporting	0–0	Benfica	Lisbon
19:00		Report		Stadium: Estádio de Alvalade; Referee: Vítor Correia

29 December 1985 15	Benfica	1–0	Boavista	Lisbon
19:45	Nunes 60'	Report		Stadium: Estádio da Luz; Referee: Rosário Rodrigues

5 January 1986 16	Benfica	0–0	Porto	Lisbon
20:00		Report		Stadium: Estádio da Luz; Attendance: 110,000; Referee: Raúl Nazaré

12 January 1986 17	Marítimo	1–2	Benfica	Funchal
19:00	Roçadas 10'	Report	Rui Águas 77', 83'	Stadium: Estádio dos Barreiros; Referee: Rosa Santos

19 January 1986 18	Benfica	3–1	Vitória de Guimarães	Lisbon
19:30	Manniche 46' (pen.); Diamantino 49'; Rui Águas 75'	Report	Oliveira 15' (o.g.)	Stadium: Estádio da Luz; Referee: José Guedes

2 February 1986 19	Vitória de Setúbal	0–1	Benfica	Setúbal
19:00		Report	Carlos Manuel 86'	Stadium: Estádio do Bonfim; Referee: Raúl Ribeiro

9 February 1986 20	Benfica	2–0	Sporting da Covilhã	Lisbon
19:45	Manniche 12', 65'	Report		Stadium: Estádio da Luz; Referee: Xavier de Oliveira

15 February 1986 21	Portimonense	0–3	Benfica	Portimão
19:00		Report	Wando 12'; Rui Águas 56'; Diamantino 74'	Stadium: Estádio Municipal de Portimão; Referee: Carlos Valente

23 February 1986 (Note: The match was abandoned at half-time because referee Miranda Dias decided the pitch had become impracticable to play football.) 22	Salgueiros	Postponed	Benfica	Porto
		Report		Stadium: Estádio Engenheiro Vidal Pinheiro

1 March 1986 23	Benfica	2–0	Penafiel	Lisbon
19:30	Shéu 48'; Oliveira 60'	Report		Stadium: Estádio da Luz; Referee: Azevedo Duarte

9 March 1986 24	Desportivo das Aves	0–1	Benfica	Aves
19:00		Report	Manniche 65'	Stadium: Estádio do CD Aves; Referee: Raúl Nazaré

15 March 1986 25	Benfica	4–0	Desportivo de Chaves	Lisbon
19:20	Rui Águas 11', 13', 40'; Manniche 63'	Report		Stadium: Estádio da Luz; Referee: Ezequiel Feijão

23 March 1986 26	Braga	1–1	Benfica	Braga
19:00	Jorge Gomes 65'	Report	Shéu 33'	Stadium: Estádio 1º de Maio; Referee: Veiga Trigo

26 March 1986 22	Salgueiros	1–1	Benfica	Porto
17:00	Armando 35'	Report	Rui Águas 77'	Stadium: Estádio Engenheiro Vidal Pinheiro; Referee: João Rosa

29 March 1986 27	Benfica	1–0	Académica	Lisbon
19:45	Rolão 74' (o.g.)	Report		Stadium: Estádio da Luz; Referee: Manuel Correia

6 April 1986 28	Belenenses	0–1	Benfica	Lisbon
19:30	Paulo Monteiro (red card) 75'	Report	Manniche 51'; Pietra (red card) 75'	Stadium: Estádio do Restelo; Referee: Miranda Dias

13 April 1986 29	Benfica	1–2	Sporting	Lisbon
20:00	Manniche 60'	Report	Morato 11'; Manuel Fernandes 22'	Stadium: Estádio da Luz; Referee: Carlos Valente

20 April 1986 30	Boavista	1–0	Benfica	Porto
19:00	Phil Walker 53'	Report		Stadium: Estádio do Bessa; Referee: Manuel Barrica

=== Taça de Portugal ===
17 November 1985 Second Rd	Alverca	0–2	Benfica	Alverca
16:00		Report	Nené 26'; Oliveira 36'	Stadium: Complexo Desportivo FC Alverca; Referee: Vítor Correia

14 December 1985 Third Rd	Benfica	5–0	SL Olivais	Lisbon
18:00	Wando 40', 50'; Rui Águas 51', 52'; César Brito 54'	Report		Stadium: Estádio da Luz; Referee: Heliodoro Saraiva

24 January 1986 Fourth Rd	Benfica	6–0	Vialonga	Lisbon
19:30	Manniche 6', 51', 89'; Rui Águas 40'; Shéu 75'; Diamantino 84'	Report		Stadium: Estádio da Luz; Referee: Sepa Santos

12 February 1986 Round of 16	Benfica	2–1	Porto	Lisbon
19:30	Manniche 55' (pen.); Rui Águas 70'	Report	Futre 50'; Celso (red card) 55'	Stadium: Estádio da Luz; Referee: Veiga Trigo

12 March 1986 Quarter-final	Benfica	5–0	Sporting	Lisbon
19:00	Rui Águas 11'; Wando 40', 90'; Álvaro 84'; Manniche 86' (pen.)	Report		Stadium: Estádio da Luz; Referee: Francisco Silva

9 April 1986 Semi-final	Penafiel	0–0 (a.e.t.)	Benfica	Penafiel
19:00		Report		Stadium: Estádio Municipal 25 de Abril; Referee: Santos Ruivo

23 April 1986 SF Replay	Benfica	4–1	Penafiel	Lisbon
20:00	Manniche 33'; Diamantino 51'; Nunes 64'; Paulo Campos 72' (o.g.)	Report	Afonso 57' (pen.)	Stadium: Estádio da Luz; Referee: Azevedo Duarte

27 April 1986 Final	Benfica	2–0	Belenenses	Oeiras
16:00	Nunes 37'; Rui Águas 70'	Report		Stadium: Estádio da Luz; Attendance: 45,000; Referee: Vítor Correia

=== European Cup Winners' Cup ===
==== Second round ====
23 October 1985 First leg	Benfica (Portugal)	2–0	(Italy) Sampdoria	Lisbon
19:45	Diamantino 47'; Rui Águas 89'	Report		Stadium: Estádio da Luz; Attendance: 40,000; Referee: Vojtech Christov

1 October 1986 Second leg	Sampdoria (Italy)	1–0 (1–2 agg.)	(Portugal) Benfica	Genoa
19:45	Lorenzo 51'	Report		Stadium: Stadio Luigi Ferraris; Attendance: 30,000; Referee: Volker Roth

==== Quarter-final ====
5 March 1986 First leg	Dukla Prague (Czechoslovakia)	1–0	(Portugal) Benfica	Prague
19:45	Luhový 14'	Report		Stadium: Stadion Juliska; Attendance: 25,000; Referee: Van Langenhove

19 March 1986 Second leg	Benfica (Portugal)	2–1 (2–2a agg.)	(Czechoslovakia) Dukla Prague	Lisbon
19:45	Carlos Manuel 19'; Manniche 37' (pen.)	Report	Korejcík 65'	Stadium: Estádio da Luz; Attendance: 50,000; Referee: Siegfried Kirschen

=== Friendlies ===
28 July 1985	Académica	3–1	Benfica	Figueira da Foz
	Pedro Xavier 68', 72', 83'		Nené 30'	Stadium: Estádio Municipal José Bento Pessoa

4 August 1985	Portimonense	0–0	Benfica	Portimão
				Stadium: Estádio Municipal de Portimão

7 August 1985 Taça de Honra	Benfica	0–0 (4–3 p)	Sporting	Lisbon
				Stadium: Estádio do Restelo; Attendance: 40,000; Referee: Cepa dos Santos
	Penalties
	Michael Manniche (penalty scored); Carlos Manuel (penalty missed); José Luís (penalty scored); Diamantino (penalty scored); Nunes (penalty scored)		(penalty scored) Rui Jordão; (penalty missed) António Sousa; (penalty missed) Manuel Fernandes; (penalty scored) Gabriel Mendes; (penalty scored) Carlos Xavier

11 August 1985	Sporting da Covilhã	1–0	Benfica	Covilhã
				Stadium: Estádio Municipal José Santos Pinto

17 August 1985 Torneio Lisboa	Benfica	0–0	Shamrock Rovers	Lisbon
				Stadium: Estádio da Luz

18 August 1985 Torneio Lisboa	Benfica	2–1	Sporting	Lisbon
	Pietra 16'; Manniche 68'		Carlos Xavier 14'	Stadium: Estádio da Luz; Attendance: 30,000; Referee: Vítor Correia

5 September 1985 Taça de Honra	Benfica	1–0	Sporting	Lisbon
	Diamantino 60'			Stadium: Estádio do Restelo; Attendance: 20,000; Referee: Fernando Rodolfo

21 September 1985 Opening Estádio	Benfica	2–1	Dinamo Bucuresti	Lisbon
	Veloso 11'; Nené 38'		Ioan Varga 12'	Stadium: Estádio da Luz; Referee: Raúl Nazaré

22 September 1985 Opening Estádio	Benfica	0–0	Porto	Lisbon
				Stadium: Estádio da Luz; Referee: Raúl Nazaré

1 June 1985 Maputo TM	Desportivo Maputo	0–1	Benfica	Maputo
			Nunes	Stadium: Estádio do Desportivo

4 June 1985 Maputo TM	Maxaquene	0–1	Benfica	Maputo
			José Luís 64'	Stadium: Estádio da Machava

== Player statistics ==
The squad for the season consisted of the players listed in the tables below, as well as staff member John Mortimore (manager), Toni (assistant manager), Eusébio (assistant manager).

Note 1: Note: Flags indicate national team as defined under FIFA eligibility rules. Players may hold more than one non-FIFA nationality.

Note 2: Players with squad numbers marked ‡ joined the club during the 1985-86 season via transfer, with more details in the following section.

No.	Pos	Nat	Player	Total		Primeira Divisão		Taça de Portugal		Cup Winners' Cup		Supertaça	
No.	Pos	Nat	Player	Apps	Goals	Apps	Goals	Apps	Goals	Apps	Goals	Apps	Goals
1	GK	(Portugal) POR	Manuel Bento	43	0	29	0	8	0	4	0	2	0
1^{‡}	GK	(Portugal) POR	Neno	2	0	1	0	1	0	0	0	0	0
2	DF	(Portugal) POR	António Veloso	43	0	30	0	8	0	3	0	2	0
2	DF	(Portugal) POR	Minervino Pietra	17	0	14	0	2	0	0	0	1	0
3	DF	(Portugal) POR	António Oliveira	43	2	29	2	8	0	4	0	2	0
3	DF	(Portugal) POR	Álvaro Magalhães	41	1	27	0	8	1	4	0	2	0
4	DF	(Portugal) POR	Samuel Quina	39	0	27	0	7	0	4	0	1	0
4^{‡}	DF	(Portugal) POR	Vítor Duarte	1	0	1	0	0	0	0	0	0	0
5	DF	(Portugal) POR	António Bastos Lopes	17	0	11	0	1	0	3	0	2	0
5	DF	(Portugal) POR	Carlos Pereira	1	0	0	0	0	0	1	0	0	0
6	MF	(Portugal) POR	José Luís	15	3	10	3	3	0	2	0	0	0
6	MF	(Portugal) POR	Carlos Manuel	35	8	25	7	5	0	4	1	1	0
7	FW	(Portugal) POR	Nené	23	8	16	7	3	1	2	0	2	0
7^{‡}	MF	(Portugal) POR	Luís Simões	4	0	4	0	0	0	0	0	0	0
7	MF	(Brazil) BRA	Wando	32	5	21	1	8	4	1	0	2	0
8	MF	(Portugal) POR	Adelino Nunes	30	5	19	2	7	2	3	1	1	0
8	FW	(Denmark) DEN	Michael Manniche	40	21	29	14	5	6	4	1	2	0
9^{‡}	FW	(Portugal) POR	Rui Águas	33	17	22	10	8	6	3	1	0	0
10	MF	(Portugal) POR	Rui Pedro	9	0	4	0	4	0	0	0	1	0
11^{‡}	FW	(Portugal) POR	César Brito	6	1	2	0	3	1	0	0	1	0
11	MF	(Portugal) POR	Diamantino Miranda	43	8	29	4	8	2	4	1	2	1
11	MF	(Portugal) POR	Shéu	40	4	27	3	7	1	4	0	2	0

== Transfers ==
=== In ===
Entry date	Position	Player	From club	Fee	Ref
24 April 1985	FW	César Brito	Covilhã	Undisclosed	
3 June 1985	DF	Luís Simões	Montijo	Undisclosed	
12 June 1985	FW	Rui Águas	Portimonense	Undisclosed	
12 June 1985	DF	Vítor Duarte	União de Coimbra	Undisclosed	
11 July 1985	GK	Neno	Vitória de Guimarães	Loan return	

=== Out ===
Exit date	Position	Player	To club	Fee	Ref
4 April 1985	DF	Humberto Coelho	None	Retired	
6 August 1985	MF	Nivaldo Silva	Portimonense	Undisclosed	
14 August 1985	FW	Jorge Silva	Chaves	Undisclosed	
21 August 1985	DF	Alberto Bastos Lopes	Penafiel	Free	
22 August 1985	MF	Tozé Santos	Marítimo	Free	

=== Out by loan ===
Exit date	Position	Player	To club	Return date	Ref
14 August 1985	GK	Silvino	Aves	30 June 1986	
August 1985	MF	Paulo Padinha	Portimonense	30 June 1986	
