= 1984–85 S.L. Benfica season =

Benfica
1984–85 season
- President: Fernando Martins
- Head coach: Pál Csernai
- Stadium: Estádio da Luz
- Primeira Divisão: 3rd
- Taça de Portugal: Winners
- European Cup: Second round
- Supertaça Cândido de Oliveira: Runners-up
- Top goalscorer: League: Manniche (17); All: Manniche (28)
Home colours

The 1984–85 season was Sport Lisboa e Benfica's 81st season in existence and the club's 51st consecutive season in the top flight of Portuguese football, covering the period from 1 July 1984 to 30 June 1985. Benfica competed domestically in the Primeira Divisão, Taça de Portugal and the Supertaça Cândido de Oliveira, and participated in the European Cup after winning the previous league.

In the off-season, Sven-Göran Eriksson left for Roma and Benfica hired Tomislav Ivic. Major departures included Fernando Chalana and Glenn Strömberg. To counter, the club added Jorge Silva, Wando and Adelino Nunes. Even before the end of the season, Ivic resigned and Benfica was forced to replace him in August. The selected was Pál Csernai. Benfica never performed as expected and even suffered their longest ever win-less period in the Primeira Divisão. In the end, the team ended in third place, 12 points from first place, and lost the Supertaça Cândido de Oliveira. Still, it was not a trophy-less season as Benfica conquered their 19th Taça de Portugal in a 3–1 win against Porto.

== Season summary ==
Benfica entered the new season as defending Champions, but with significant changes. After two years in Portugal, Sven-Göran Eriksson was hired by Roma. Same of the names speculated as replacement were Georges Heylens, John Mortimore and Gilbert Gress. The new manager was announced on 6 July, Croatian Tomislav Ivic. In the transfer season, Benfica lost two major players, Fernando Chalana and Glenn Strömberg. To replace him, Benfica signed domestic players like Jorge Silva, Wando and Adelino Nunes. The club also approached Torbjörn Nilsson, Washington and Walter Casagrande, but nothing came out of it. The pre-season began on 19 July, with games scheduled with Bordeaux on late July, the Lisbon International Tournament in August, and the presentation game with Vasco da Gama after that. After just one game in charge, on 31 July, Tomislav Ivic resigned because he wanted to get paid in dollars. The position was offered to assistant manager Toni but he declined it for unspecified reasons. On 9 August, Benfica selected Pál Csernai as Ivic's replacement.

The league campaign started in the best of ways, with two wins, but on match-day 3, Benfica lost in the Clássico with Porto. In October, Benfica began their European Cup campaign with Crvena Zvezda, defeating them on aggregate. In the second round, Benfica met Liverpool and were eliminated. Now fully focused on the league campaign, Benfica lost in the Lisbon derby in late December and got delayed in the battle to retain his league title. There were now 6 points shy of leaders Porto. On 20 January, Benfica drew with Braga on match-day 17 and started their biggest ever win-less period in the Primeira Divisão. They would spend two and half months without winning in the league, with six draws and one loss. Despite that, a Taça de Portugal campaign involving only second tier teams allowed the team to progress through the rounds with ease.

The team eventually resettled and won all league matches in April. In the Supertaça Cândido de Oliveira, a one-nil win for both Benfica and Porto forced a replay of the competition. In early May, John Mortimore was confirmed as new manager, with Csernai still in charge for another month. Before the end of May, Benfica lost away in the first leg of the Supertaça to Porto, but won the Lisbon derby with Sporting by 3–1, reducing the distance between them. In June, Benfica lost again in the Supertaça, losing the competition and finished the league in third place, 12 points behind Porto and five from Sporting. The season finished with the Taça de Portugal final against Porto, with Benfica winning 3–1. It was their 19th Taça de Portugal win in 25 Finals, their seventh in eight against Porto. After the win, Manuel Bento sent a jab to Csernai: "It was not Csernai who made the line up, that's why we won. It was Carlos Manuel and Minervino Pietra who opened his eyes."

== Competitions ==
Win Draw Loss Postponed

=== Overall record ===
Competition	First match	Last match	Record								
Competition	First match	Last match	G	W	D	L	GF	GA	GD	Win %	Source
Primeira Divisão	26 August 1984	2 June 1985	30	18	7	5	65	28	+37	60.00	
Taça de Portugal	9 December 1984	10 June 1985	7	7	0	0	28	2	+26	100.00	
European Cup	19 September 1984	7 November 1984	4	2	0	2	6	6	+0	50.00	
Supertaça Cândido de Oliveira	27 March 1985	30 May 1985	4	1	0	3	1	5	−4	25.00	
Total			45	28	7	10	100	41	+59	62.22	

=== Supertaça Cândido de Oliveira ===
27 March 1985 First leg	Benfica	1–0	Porto	Lisbon
20:30	Manniche 56'	Report		Stadium: Estádio da Luz; Attendance: 70,000; Referee: Carlos Silva Valente

17 April 1985 Second leg	Porto	1–0	Benfica	Porto
21:30	Vermelhinho 87'			Stadium: Estádio das Antas; Attendance: 60,000; Referee: Rosa Santos

16 May 1985 Replay 1L	Porto	3–0	Benfica	Porto
21:30	Vermelhinho 5'; Gomes 37', 88'			Stadium: Estádio das Antas; Attendance: 50,000; Referee: Raúl Ribeiro

30 May 1985 Replay 2L	Benfica	0–1	Porto	Lisbon
20:00			Futre 30'	Stadium: Estádio da Luz; Attendance: 50,000; Referee: Santos Ruivo

=== Primeira Divisão ===
==== League table ====
Pos	Team	Pld	W	D	L	GF	GA	GD	Pts	Qualification or relegation
1	Porto (C)	30	26	3	1	78	13	+65	55	Qualification to European Cup first round
2	Sporting CP	30	19	9	2	72	26	+46	47	Qualification to UEFA Cup first round
3	Benfica	30	18	7	5	65	28	+37	43	Qualification to Cup Winners' Cup first round (Note: Benfica qualified for the Cup Winners' Cup as Portuguese Cup winners)
4	Boavista	30	13	11	6	37	26	+11	37	Qualification to UEFA Cup first round
5	Portimonense	30	14	8	8	51	41	+10	36	Qualification to UEFA Cup first round

Source: RSSSF
(C) Champions

==== Results by round ====
Round	1	2	3	4	5	6	7	8	9	10	11	12	13	14	15	16	17	18	19	20	21	22	23	24	25	26	27	28	29	30
Ground	A	H	A	H	A	H	H	A	H	A	H	A	H	A	H	H	A	H	A	H	A	A	H	A	H	A	H	A	H	A
Result	W	W	L	W	D	W	W	W	W	L	W	W	W	L	W	W	D	L	D	D	D	D	D	W	W	W	W	L	W	W
Position	5	2	6	5	6	3	3	3	3	3	3	3	3	3	3	3	3	3	3	3	3	3	3	3	3	3	3	3	3	3

Source: ForaDeJogo
A = Away; H = Home; W = Win; D = Draw; L = Loss

==== Matches ====
26 August 1984 1	Vizela	1–2	Benfica	Guimarães
18:30	José Carlos (yellow card) 57' (yellow-red card) 63'; Mauricio 83'	Report	Manniche 30' (pen.); Carlos Manuel 47'	Stadium: Estádio D. Afonso Henriques; Referee: José Guedes

2 September 1984 2	Benfica	2–0	Braga	Lisbon
19:00	Manniche 46', 90' (pen.)	Report		Stadium: Estádio da Luz; Referee: Ezequiel Feijão

16 September 1984 3	Porto	2–0	Benfica	Porto
19:30	Fernando Gomes 16', 18'	Report		Stadium: Estádio das Antas; Referee: Alder Dante

23 September 1984 4	Benfica	2–0	Rio Ave	Lisbon
19:30	Wando 2'; Manniche 4'	Report		Stadium: Estádio da Luz; Referee: Francisco Silva

29 September 1984 5	Boavista	0–0	Benfica	Porto
19:00		Report	José Luís (yellow card) 69' (yellow-red card) 82'	Stadium: Estádio do Bessa; Referee: Rosa Santos

7 October 1984 6	Benfica	5–1	Portimonense	Lisbon
20:00	Jorge Silva 24', 28', 85'; Manniche 60' (pen.); Carlos Manuel 82'	Report	Rui Águas 42'	Stadium: Estádio da Luz; Referee: Isidro Santos

20 October 1984 7	Benfica	4–3	Vitória de Setúbal	Lisbon
19:30	Wando 12'; Carlos Manuel 45'; Manniche 67' (pen.); Jorge Martins 80' (o.g.)	Report	Roçadas 29'; Vitinha 55'; Artur Ferreira 81' (pen.)	Stadium: Estádio da Luz; Attendance: 40,000; Referee: Azevedo Duarte

28 October 1984 8	Vitória de Guimarães	1–4	Benfica	Guimarães
19:00	Da Silva 85'	Report	Carlos Manuel 24'; Manniche 68', 90'; Wando 76'	Stadium: Estádio D. Afonso Henriques; Referee: Veiga Trigo

3 November 1984 9	Benfica	3–2	Académica	Lisbon
19:45	Manniche 29' (pen.); Diamantino 48'; Carlos Manuel 72'	Report	Ribeiro 17', 75'	Stadium: Estádio da Luz; Referee: Manuel dos Santos

18 November 1984 10	Farense	1–0	Benfica	Faro
19:15	Paco Fortes 13'	Report		Stadium: Estádio de São Luís; Referee: Carlos Valente

25 November 1984 11	Benfica	3–0	Salgueiros	Lisbon
19:30	Wando 48'; Jorge Silva 51'; Diamantino 69'	Report		Stadium: Estádio da Luz; Referee: Manuel Correia

2 December 1984 (Note: Interrupted at minute 32 after assistant referee António Jorge was hit in a head with a bottle.) 12	Varzim	Postponed	Benfica	Póvoa de Varzim
				Stadium: Estádio do Varzim SC

16 December 1984 13	Benfica	2–1	Penafiel	Lisbon
19:30	Manniche 60' (pen.); Jorge Silva 78'	Report	Branco 77' (pen.)	Stadium: Estádio da Luz; Referee: Fortunato Azevedo

22 December 1984 14	Sporting	1–0	Benfica	Lisbon
19:00	Manuel Fernandes 3'	Report		Stadium: Estádio de Alvalade; Referee: Veiga Trigo

30 December 1984 15	Benfica	4–1	Belenenses	Lisbon
19:00	Manniche 26', 85'; Pietra 80'; Nené 87'	Report	Ronnie Glavin 60'	Stadium: Estádio da Luz; Referee: José Guedes

9 January 1985 12	Varzim	0–1	Benfica	Póvoa de Varzim
19:00		Report	Diamantino 6'	Stadium: Estádio do Varzim SC; Referee: Raúl Ribeiro

17 January 1985 16	Benfica	5–1	Vizela	Lisbon
19:00	Nené 18', 44'; Jorge Silva 57', 83'; Carlos Manuel 63'	Report	Perrichon 89'	Stadium: Estádio da Luz; Referee: Santos Ruivo

20 January 1985 17	Braga	2–2	Benfica	Braga
19:00	Zinho 31' (pen.); José Abrantes 72'	Report	Samuel 11'; Veloso 44'	Stadium: Estádio 1º de Maio; Referee: Miranda Dias

27 January 1985 18	Benfica	0–1	Porto	Lisbon
20:00		Report	Fernando Gomes 70'	Stadium: Estádio da Luz; Referee: Francisco Silva

16 February 1985 19	Rio Ave	2–2	Benfica	Vila do Conde
19:00	Carvalho 34'; Rui Lopes 66'	Report	Carlos Manuel 5'; Nené 86'	Stadium: Estádio dos Arcos; Referee: Raúl Nazaré

3 March 1985 20	Benfica	0–0	Boavista	Lisbon
19:45		Report		Stadium: Estádio da Luz; Referee: Carlos Valente

10 March 1985 21	Portimonense	0–0	Benfica	Portimão
19:00		Report		Stadium: Estádio Municipal de Portimão; Referee: Raúl Ribeiro

24 March 1985 22	Vitória de Setúbal	2–2	Benfica	Setúbal
19:00	Vitinha 54'; Mota 64'	Report	José Luís 26'; Wando 31'	Stadium: Estádio do Bonfim; Referee: Fernando Alberto

30 March 1985 23	Benfica	0–0	Vitória de Guimarães	Lisbon
19:30		Report		Stadium: Estádio da Luz; Referee: José Guedes

14 April 1985 24	Académica	1–2	Benfica	Coimbra
19:00	Ribeiro 47'	Report	Manniche 30'; Pietra 56'	Stadium: Estádio Municipal de Coimbra; Referee: Azevedo Duarte

21 April 1985 25	Benfica	6–0	Farense	Lisbon
19:00	Nené 12'; Manniche 50'; Pietra 52'; Diamantino 62'; Nunes 75'; Jorge Silva 87'	Report		Stadium: Estádio da Luz; Referee: Isidro Santos

27 April 1985 26	Salgueiros	2–3	Benfica	Matosinhos
19:00	Tonanha 69', 84'	Report	Álvaro 58'; Manniche 64'; Nunes 67'	Stadium: Estádio do Mar; Referee: Veiga Trigo

12 May 1985 27	Benfica	5–1	Varzim	Lisbon
19:20	Wando 14'; Manniche 44'; Pietra 46'; Carlos Manuel 74'; Diamantino 86'	Report	Vata 63'	Stadium: Estádio da Luz; Referee: Manuel Correia

19 May 1985 28	Penafiel	1–0	Benfica	Penafiel
19:00	Jason 53'	Report		Stadium: Estádio Municipal 25 de Abril; Referee: Santos Ruivo

26 May 1985 29	Benfica	3–1	Sporting	Lisbon
20:00	Nené 23', 53'; Diamantino 88'	Report	Romeu Silva 34'	Stadium: Estádio da Luz; Referee: Fernando Alberto

2 June 1985 30	Belenenses	0–3	Benfica	Lisbon
19:30		Report	Pietra 7'; Nené 41'; Manniche 86'	Stadium: Estádio do Restelo; Referee: José Guedes

=== Taça de Portugal ===
9 December 1984 Second Rd	Benfica	9–0	Ponte da Barca	Lisbon
18:00	Manniche 2', 10', 47', 50'; António Oliveira 43'; Jorge Silva 57'; Wando 60', 86'; Diamantino 80'	Report		Stadium: Estádio da Luz; Referee: Gil Rosa

6 January 1985 Third Rd	Macedo de Cavaleiros	1–3	Benfica	Macedo de Cavaleiros
16:00	Ailton 86' (pen.)	Report	José Luís 6'; Wando 9', 28'	Stadium: Municipal de Macedo de Cavaleiros; Referee: Joaquim Guedes

3 February 1985 Fourth Rd	Benfica	4–0	Régua	Lisbon
18:30	Jorge Silva 28'; Diamantino 54'; Carlos Manuel 75'; Nené 81'	Report		Stadium: Estádio da Luz; Referee: Ezequiel Feijão

17 March 1985 Round of 16	Benfica	4–0	Cova da Piedade	Lisbon
17:30	Jorge Silva 35'; Nené 60', 73'; Nunes 70'	Report		Stadium: Estádio da Luz; Referee: Xavier de Oliveira

4 May 1985 Quarter-final	Paredes	0–3	Benfica	Penafiel
17:00		Report	Manniche 12'; Wando 28'; Nené 30'	Stadium: Estádio Municipal 25 de Abril; Referee: Miranda Dias

5 June 1985 Semi-final	Benfica	2–0	Sporting da Covilhã	Lisbon
18:00	Manniche 66', 70' (pen.)	Report		Stadium: Estádio da Luz; Referee: Francisco Silva

10 June 1985 Final	Benfica	3–1	Porto	Oeiras
16:00	Nunes 14'; Manniche 33', 47' (pen.)	Report	Futre 67' (pen.)	Stadium: Estádio Nacional; Attendance: 45,000; Referee: Rául Nazaré

=== European Cup ===
==== First round ====
19 September 1984 First leg	Crvena Zvezda (Socialist Federal Republic of Yugoslavia)	3–2	(Portugal) Benfica	Belgrade
17:30	Janjanin 57' (pen.), 77' (pen.), 78'	Report	Elsner 27' (o.g.); Diamantino 42'	Stadium: Marakana; Attendance: 64,000; Referee: André Daina

3 October 1984 Second leg	Benfica (Portugal)	2–0 (4–3 agg.)	(Socialist Federal Republic of Yugoslavia) Crvena Zvezda	Lisbon
22:00	Carlos Manuel 72', 80'	Report		Stadium: Estádio da Luz; Attendance: 32,000; Referee: Dieter Pauly

==== Second round ====
24 October 1984 First leg	Liverpool (England)	3–1	(Portugal) Benfica	Liverpool
20:30	Rush 44', 71', 77'	Report	Diamantino 51'	Stadium: Anfield; Attendance: 27,733; Referee: Van Langenhove

7 November 1984 Second leg	Benfica (Portugal)	1–0 (2–3 agg.)	(England) Liverpool	Lisbon
21:30	Manniche 6' (pen.); Pietra (red card) 44'	Report	Dalglish (red card) 44'	Stadium: Estádio da Luz; Attendance: 35,000; Referee: Michel Vautrot

=== Friendlies ===
28 July 1984	Benfica	2–1	Bordeaux	Lisbon
20:30	Shéu 1'; Jorge Silva 77'		Audrain 64'	Stadium: Estádio da Luz; Referee: Graça Oliva

5 August 1984 Toronto TM	Toronto Blizzard	2–0	Benfica	Toronto
	Ace Ntsoelengoe 32'; Roberto Bettega 48'			Stadium: Varsity Stadium

10 August 1984 Lisbon TM	Benfica	2–0	Atlético Madrid	Lisbon
21:00	Carlos Manuel 43'; Nené 46'			Stadium: Estádio da Luz; Attendance: 20,000; Referee: Vítor Correia

12 August 1984 Lisbon TM	Sporting	3–1	Benfica	Lisbon
21:00	Jaime Pacheco 44'; Litos 72', 79'		Venâncio 17' (o.g.)	Stadium: Estádio de Alvalade; Referee: Rául Nazaré

16 August 1984	Benfica	1–1	Vasco da Gama	Lisbon
	Manniche 18'		Marquinho Carioca 54'	Stadium: Estádio da Luz; Referee: Francisco Passeiro

18 August 1984	Vitória de Setúbal	0–0	Benfica	Setúbal
				Stadium: Estádio do Bonfim; Referee: Heliodoro Saraiva

19 August 1984	Bragança	1–1	Benfica	Bragança
	Oscar 19'		António Oliveira 54'	Stadium: Estádio Municipal; Referee: Luís Silva

7 September 1984 Taça de Honra	Benfica	2–1	Belenenses	Lisbon
	Jorge Silva 22', 84'		Djão 63' (pen.)	Stadium: Estádio da Luz; Referee: Vítor Correia

6 December 1984 Taça de Honra	Benfica	1–2	Sporting	Lisbon
	Paulo Padinha 57'		Romeu 25'; Fernando Cruz 40'	Stadium: Estádio da Luz; Referee: Fernando Passeiro

== Player statistics ==
The squad for the season consisted of the players listed in the tables below, as well as staff member Pál Csernai (manager), Toni (assistant manager), Eusébio assistant manager), Júlio Borges (Director of Football), Amilcar Miranda (Doctor).

Note 1: Note: Flags indicate national team as defined under FIFA eligibility rules. Players may hold more than one non-FIFA nationality.

Note 2: Players with squad numbers marked ‡ joined the club during the 1984-85 season via transfer, with more details in the following section.

No.	Pos	Nat	Player	Total		Primeira Divisão		Taça de Portugal		European Cup		Supertaça	
No.	Pos	Nat	Player	Apps	Goals	Apps	Goals	Apps	Goals	Apps	Goals	Apps	Goals
1	GK	(Portugal) POR	Manuel Bento	44	0	30	0	6	0	4	0	4	0
2	DF	(Portugal) POR	Minervino Pietra	44	5	29	5	7	0	4	0	4	0
2	DF	(Portugal) POR	António Veloso	11	1	9	1	2	0	0	0	0	0
3	DF	(Portugal) POR	António Oliveira	45	1	30	0	7	1	4	0	4	0
3	DF	(Portugal) POR	Álvaro Magalhães	33	1	20	1	5	0	4	0	4	0
4	DF	(Portugal) POR	Samuel Quina	28	1	21	1	4	0	3	0	0	0
5	DF	(Portugal) POR	António Bastos Lopes	30	0	20	0	4	0	2	0	4	0
5	DF	(Portugal) POR	Carlos Pereira	1	0	0	0	0	0	0	0	1	0
6	MF	(Portugal) POR	José Luís	42	2	28	1	6	1	4	0	4	0
6	MF	(Portugal) POR	Carlos Manuel	43	11	28	8	7	1	4	2	4	0
7	FW	(Portugal) POR	Nené	24	12	16	8	6	4	1	0	1	0
7^{‡}	MF	(Portugal) POR	Tozé Santos	8	0	3	0	2	0	2	0	1	0
7^{‡}	MF	(Brazil) BRA	Wando	37	11	25	6	6	5	4	0	2	0
8^{‡}	MF	(Portugal) POR	Adelino Nunes	24	4	14	2	4	2	3	0	3	0
8^{‡}	MF	(Brazil) BRA	Nivaldo Silva	8	0	6	0	0	0	2	0	0	0
8	FW	(Denmark) DEN	Michael Manniche	36	28	23	17	5	9	4	1	4	1
9	FW	(Portugal) POR	Paulo Padinha	1	0	1	0	0	0	0	0	0	0
11^{‡}	FW	(Portugal) POR	Jorge Silva	37	11	26	8	5	3	3	0	3	0
11	MF	(Portugal) POR	Diamantino Miranda	42	10	28	6	6	2	4	2	4	0
11	MF	(Portugal) POR	Shéu	18	0	12	0	1	0	3	0	2	0
12	GK	(Portugal) POR	Delgado	1	0	0	0	1	0	0	0	0	0

== Transfers ==
=== In ===
Entry date	Position	Player	From club	Fee	Ref
7 April 1984	FW	Jorge Silva	Boavista	Undisclosed	
26 April 1984	MF	Nivaldo Silva	Vitória de Guimarães	Undisclosed	
10 May 1984	MF	Adelino Nunes	Vitória de Setúbal	Undisclosed	
23 May 1984	MF	Wando	Braga	Undisclosed	
19 July 1984	GK	Silvino	Vitória de Guimarães	Undisclosed	
20 July 1984	MF	Tozé Santos	Torreense	Undisclosed	

=== Out ===
Exit date	Position	Player	To club	Fee	Ref
11 June 1984	FW	Zoran Filipovic	Boavista	Free	
7 July 1984	MF	Fernando Chalana	Bordeaux	Undisclosed	
7 July 1984	MF	Glenn Strömberg	Atalanta	Undisclosed	
1 August 1984	FW	Fernando Folha	Varzim	Free	

=== Out by loan ===
Exit date	Position	Player	To club	Return date	Ref
31 July 1984	DF	Alberto Bastos Lopes	Belenenses	30 June 1985	
3 August 1984	GK	Neno	Vitória de Guimarães	30 June 1985	
