= 1982–83 S.L. Benfica season =

Benfica
1982–83 season
- President: Fernando Martins
- Head coach: Sven-Göran Eriksson
- Stadium: Estádio da Luz
- Primeira Divisão: 1st
- Taça de Portugal: Winners
- UEFA Cup: Runners-up
- Top goalscorer: League: Nené (22); All: Nené (32)
Home colours

The 1982–83 season was Sport Lisboa e Benfica's 79th season in existence and the club's 49th consecutive season in the top flight of Portuguese football, covering the period from 1 July 1982 to 30 June 1983. Benfica competed domestically in the Primeira Divisão and the Taça de Portugal, and participated in the UEFA Cup after coming in second in previous league.

In the new season, manager Lajos Baróti was replaced by Sven-Göran Eriksson. The Swede released several players from the squad, but only added Diamantino Miranda. The league campaign saw Benfica win the first eleven league games, opening a four-point gap by the end of the first round. In Europe, Benfica progressed through the UEFA Cup, by eliminating Real Betis, KSC Lokeren and FC Zürich. The domestic campaign in the second half of the season was less impressive, with Benfica having three batches of two consecutive draws. In the UEFA Cup, Benfica eliminated Roma in the quarter-finals and Universitatea Craiova in the semis, before they meeting Anderlecht in the UEFA Cup final. An away loss and home draw cost them the trophy. Still, five consecutive wins in the final five league matches secured the club's 25th Primeira Divisão title. The last match of the season, the Taça de Portugal final was postponed and only played in the following season.

== Season summary ==
After Lajos Baróti failed to defend retain any of the titles he won in his first season, he was replaced by the 33–year old Sven-Göran Eriksson, who had just won the UEFA Cup. Prior to his signing, Benfica contacted John Bond, but he declined the offer. He arrived on 27 June and pre-season begun two days later, on Tuesday, the 29. Benfica made almost no new signings, other than the return of Diamantino Miranda, so Eriksson sought to reduce the size of the squad which approached 40, with more than 10 players leaving the club in the transfer season. Benfica made their presentation game against Ferencvárosi and competed in the Toronto Tournament in early August.

Benfica started their league campaign by winning their first eleven matches in a row, opening a five-point lead over second place, while scoring 27 goals and conceding only four. Manuel Bento went 565 minutes without conceding from match-day 4 to match-day 8. At the same time, Benfica started the UEFA Cup by eliminating Real Betis and KSC Lokeren. In December, Benfica dropped the first points in the league in a draw in Alcobaça, while in Europe, they knocked-out FC Zürich with 4-0 win at home. On 2 January, Benfica lost for the first time in the Primeira Divisão, in the Lisbon derby with Sporting. However they still lapped the first round with a four-point lead over their rivals. On match-day 17, Benfica drew again, now by 2–2 in Bessa, but it did not have any real effect because Porto had also drawn on the same day. On the opening match of February, another draw that cost a point in the title race. Benfica remained erratic, having two more draws in March, followed by a win. In Europe, Benfica faced Roma, one of strongest Italian teams of his era; beating them 2–1 on the Stadio Olimpico. At home, Benfica drew one-equal and eliminate them on aggregate. Filipovic had scored all of Benfica's goals in the tie.

Domestically, in late March, Benfica visited the Estádio das Antas in the Clássico with Porto. A 0–0 draw better suited Benfica, who kept the four point lead over his rival. A few days later, Benfica beat Sporting by 3–0 in the quarter-final of the Taça de Portugal. That game preceded the UEFA Cup tie with Universitatea Craiova that followed, in which Benfica passed on away goals, securing a place in the UEFA Cup final. On 4 May, Benfica faced Anderlecht on the Heysel Stadium, losing one-nil. On the return leg, two weeks later, Benfica sold-out their stadium and even scored first by Shéu, but the Belgians levelled it only a few minutes later and held on to the draw, winning the competition. Eriksson said: "The party ended up early with that goal from Lozano. We should have played smarter because the fast breaks of Anderlecht were very strong. Patience...". Humberto Coelho said that Benfica rushed to score the second goal, after Sheú's goal, and made a fatal mistake that allowed their opponent to score. João Alves, irritated by not starting, complained of Eriksson choice of the starting eleven. Four days later, Benfica visited Portimonense, where they won 1–0 with a goal from Carlos Manuel on the 85th minute. The win confirmed the 25th league title for the club, after a one-year off. They closed the Primeira Divisão with a four-point lead over Porto, after winning the two remaining games. The season should have concluded with the Portuguese Cup final which pinned Benfica against Porto in the Estádio Municipal de Coimbra. However, Porto and Porto Football Association started a legal battle with the Portuguese Football Federation to change the venue to Estádio das Antas. It ended up being postponed and only played in August 1983 in Estádio das Antas, with Benfica winning it by 1–0.

== Competitions ==
Win Draw Loss Postponed

=== Overall record ===
Competition	First match	Last match	Record								
Competition	First match	Last match	G	W	D	L	GF	GA	GD	Win %	Source
Primeira Divisão	22 August 1982	5 June 1983	30	22	7	1	67	13	+54	73.33	
Taça de Portugal	7 November 1982	21 August 1983	7	7	0	0	27	3	+24	100.00	
UEFA Cup	15 September 1982	18 May 1983	12	6	5	1	18	9	+9	50.00	
Total			49	35	12	2	112	25	+87	71.43	

=== Primeira Divisão ===
==== League table ====
Pos	Team	Pld	W	D	L	GF	GA	GD	Pts	Qualification or relegation
1	Benfica (C)	30	22	7	1	67	13	+54	51	Qualification to European Cup first round
2	Porto	30	20	7	3	73	18	+55	47	Qualification to Cup Winners' Cup first round (Note: Porto qualified for the Cup Winners' Cup as the other finalist, Benfica, had qualified for the European Cup.)
3	Sporting CP	30	18	6	6	48	25	+23	42	Qualification to UEFA Cup first round
4	Vitória de Guimarães	30	11	10	9	35	24	+11	32	Qualification to UEFA Cup first round
5	Boavista	30	12	6	12	32	38	−6	30	

Source: RSSSF and footballzz.co.uk
(C) Champions

==== Results by round ====
Round	1	2	3	4	5	6	7	8	9	10	11	12	13	14	15	16	17	18	19	20	21	22	23	24	25	26	27	28	29	30
Ground	A	H	A	H	A	H	H	A	H	A	H	A	H	A	H	H	A	H	A	H	A	A	H	A	H	A	H	A	H	A
Result	W	W	W	W	W	W	W	W	W	W	W	D	W	L	W	W	D	D	W	W	D	D	W	D	D	W	W	W	W	W
Position	4	1	1	1	1	1	1	1	1	1	1	1	1	1	1	1	1	1	1	1	1	1	1	1	1	1	1	1	1	1

Source: ForaDeJogo
A = Away; H = Home; W = Win; D = Draw; L = Loss

==== Matches ====
22 August 1982 1	Espinho	0–1	Benfica	São João da Madeira
18:30		Report	Humberto Coelho 75'	Stadium: Estádio Conde Dias Garcia; Referee: Veiga Trigo

28 August 1982 2	Benfica	3–0	Boavista	Lisbon
20:45	Nené 30', 56'; Carlos Manuel 49'	Report		Stadium: Estádio da Luz; Referee: Mário Luís

5 September 1982 3	Vitória de Setúbal	1–3	Benfica	Setúbal
18:00	Fernando Cruz 15'	Report	32', 67' Filipovic; 33' Nené	Stadium: Estádio do Bonfim; Referee: Alder Dante

11 September 1982 4	Benfica	1–0	Salgueiros	Lisbon
19:00	Soares 58' (o.g.)	Report		Stadium: Estádio da Luz; Referee: Francisco Silva

26 September 1982 5	Estoril Praia	0–1	Benfica	Estoril
18:30		Report	78' Nené	Stadium: Estádio António Coimbra da Mota; Referee: Raúl Ribeiro

16 October 1982 6	Benfica	8–0	Varzim	Lisbon
19:20	Diamantino 4'; Humberto Coelho 27', 35'; Filipovic 52', 70', 73', 78'; Veloso 60'	Report		Stadium: Estádio da Luz; Referee: Rosa Santos

24 October 1982 7	Benfica	1–0	Vitória de Guimarães	Lisbon
19:30	Carlos Manuel 30'	Report		Stadium: Estádio da Luz; Referee: Fernando Alberto

31 October 1982 8	Marítimo	0–1	Benfica	Funchal
18:00		Report	35' Nené	Stadium: Estádio dos Barreiros; Referee: Ezequiel Feijão

14 November 1982 9	Benfica	3–1	Porto	Lisbon
20:00	Bastos Lopes 12'; Veloso 35'; Nené 85'	Report	40' Inácio	Stadium: Estádio da Luz; Referee: Alder Dante

20 November 1982 10	Rio Ave	0–1	Benfica	Vila do Conde
19:00		Report	66' Nené	Stadium: Campo da Avenida; Referee: Veiga Trigo

28 November 1982 11	Benfica	4–2	Amora	Lisbon
19:30	Filipovic 5'; Carlos Manuel 11'; Nené 73' (pen.), 82'	Report	49' José Ribeiro; 61' Caio Cambalhota	Stadium: Estádio da Luz; Referee: Joaquim Gonçalves

5 December 1982 12	Alcobaça	1–1	Benfica	Alcobaça
19:00	Nelito 40'	Report	88' Nené	Stadium: Estádio Municipal de Alcobaça; Referee: Amândio Silva

19 December 1982 13	Benfica	4–1	Portimonense	Lisbon
18:00	Filipovic 5', 9'; Nené 71', 88'	Report	44'Joaquim Murça	Stadium: Estádio da Luz; Referee: Raúl Nazaré

2 January 1983 14	Sporting	1–0	Benfica	Lisbon
20:00	Rui Jordão 50' (pen.)	Report		Stadium: Estádio de Alvalade; Referee: Rosa Santos

9 January 1983 15	Benfica	6–0	Braga	Lisbon
19:00	Humberto Coelho 9', 89'; Nené 51', 66', 83'; Dito 75' (o.g.)	Report	(yellow card) 19' (yellow-red card) 31' Guedes	Stadium: Estádio da Luz; Referee: Albino Rodrigues

15 January 1983 16	Benfica	4–0	Espinho	Lisbon
19:30	Filipovic 15', 29'; Nené 54', 67'	Report		Stadium: Estádio da Luz; Referee: Júlio Bastos

29 January 1983 17	Boavista	2–2	Benfica	Porto
18:30	Coelho 2'; Rui Palhares 49' (pen.)	Report	26' Filipovic; 84' Carlos Manuel	Stadium: Estádio do Bessa; Referee: Raúl Nazaré

5 February 1983 18	Benfica	1–1	Vitória de Setúbal	Lisbon
19:00	Humberto Coelho 52' (pen.)	Report	10' Rui Lopes	Stadium: Estádio da Luz; Referee: João Rosa

13 February 1983 19	Salgueiros	0–1	Benfica	Porto
19:00		Report	14' Diamantino	Stadium: Estádio Engenheiro Vidal Pinheiro; Referee: Santos Ruivo

26 February 1983 20	Benfica	3–0	Estoril Praia	Lisbon
18:00	Filipovic 25'; Diamantino 38'; José Luís 83'	Report		Stadium: Estádio da Luz; Referee: Amândio Silva

6 March 1983 21	Varzim	1–1	Benfica	Póvoa de Varzim
19:00	Washington 20'	Report	64' Diamantino	Stadium: Estádio do Varzim SC; Referee: Mário Luís

13 March 1983 22	Vitória de Guimarães	0–0	Benfica	Guimarães
19:00		Report		Stadium: Estádio D. Afonso Henriques; Referee: Carlos Valente

20 March 1983 23	Benfica	2–0	Marítimo	Lisbon
19:00	Diamantino 62'; Filipovic 65'	Report	(yellow card) 20' (yellow-red card) 43' Beca	Stadium: Estádio da Luz; Referee: Miranda Dias

27 March 1983 24	Porto	0–0	Benfica	Porto
19:00	João Pinto (yellow card) 0' (yellow-red card) 80'	Report		Stadium: Estádio das Antas; Referee: Raúl Nazaré

10 April 1983 25	Benfica	0–0	Rio Ave	Lisbon
19:00		Report	(yellow card) 56' (yellow-red card) 73' Cabumba	Stadium: Estádio da Luz; Referee: Manuel Correia

16 April 1983 26	Amora	1–3	Benfica	Amora
19:30	José Rafael 23'	Report	Diamantino 20' (pen.), 81'; Shéu 53'	Stadium: Estádio da Medideira; Referee: Alder Dante

14 May 1983 27	Benfica	8–1	Alcobaça	Lisbon
18:30	Nené 3', 17', 66', 69', 70'; Diamantino 12', 61'; Chalana 31'	Report	Nelito 20'	Stadium: Estádio da Luz; Referee: Américo Barradas

22 May 1983 28	Portimonense	0–1	Benfica	Portimão
18:00		Report	Carlos Manuel 85'	Stadium: Estádio Municipal de Portimão; Referee: Rosa Santos

29 May 1983 29	Benfica	1–0	Sporting	Lisbon
20:00	Chalana 9'	Report		Stadium: Estádio da Luz; Referee: Vitor Correia

5 June 1983 30	Braga	0–2	Benfica	Braga
19:00		Report	Shéu 25'; Chalana 33'	Stadium: Estádio 1º de Maio; Referee: Isidro Santos

=== Taça de Portugal ===
7 November 1982 Second Rd	Benfica	8–1	Campinense	Lisbon
18:00	João Alves 6'; Filipovic 11', 25', 37'; Nené 13', 26', 71' (pen.); Carlos Manuel 64'	Report	Amado 49'	Stadium: Estádio da Luz; Attendance: 30,000; Referee: Júlio Bastos

11 December 1982 Third Rd	Atlético	0–6	Benfica	Lisbon
16:00		Report	Diamantino 14'; Filipovic 32'; Humberto Coelho 55', 59'; Pietra 85'; Veloso 88'	Stadium: Estádio da Tapadinha; Attendance: 5,000; Referee: Miranda Dias

23 January 1983 Fourth Rd	Paços de Ferreira	1–5	Benfica	Paços de Ferreira
16:00	Cerqueira 29'	Report	Chalana 25'; Humberto Coelho 27'; Diamantino 59', 78'; João Alves 70'	Stadium: Estádio da Mata Real; Attendance: 7,000; Referee: Azevedo Duarte

20 February 1983 Round of 16	Leixões	1–2	Benfica	Matosinhos
16:00	Amauri 38'	Report	Humberto Coelho 33'; Filipovic 60'	Stadium: Estádio do Mar; Attendance: 12,000; Referee: Alder Dante

2 April 1983 Quarter-final	Benfica	3–0	Sporting	Lisbon
20:00	Chalana 28'; Diamantino 30'; Carlos Manuel 70'	Report		Stadium: Estádio da Luz; Attendance: 70,000; Referee: Marques Pires

8 May 1983 Semi-final	Benfica	2–0	Portimonense	Lisbon
19:00	Nené 17', 38'	Report		Stadium: Estádio da Luz; Attendance: 60,000; Referee: Fernando Alberto

12 June 1982 (Note: Postponed after a legal battle between Porto, Porto FA and the Portuguese Football Federation) Final	Porto	Postponed	Benfica	Coimbra
				Stadium: Estádio Municipal de Coimbra

=== UEFA Cup ===
==== First round ====
15 September 1982 First leg	Benfica (Portugal)	2–1	(Spain) Real Betis	Lisbon
22:00	Nené 44' (pen.); Padinha 73'	Report	Diarte 76'	Stadium: Estádio da Luz; Attendance: 60,000; Referee: George Courtney

29 September 1982 Second leg	Real Betis (Spain)	1–2 (2–4 agg.)	(Portugal) Benfica	Seville
20:00	Rincón 25'	Report	Carlos Manuel 67'; Nené 83'	Stadium: Estadio Benito Villamarín; Attendance: 45,000; Referee: Michel Vautrot

==== Second round ====
20 October 1982 First leg	Benfica (Portugal)	2–0	(Belgium) KSC Lokeren	Lisbon
16:00	Nené 20'; Pietra 66'	Report		Stadium: Estádio da Luz; Attendance: 40,000; Referee: Dimitar Dimitrov

3 November 1982 Second leg	KSC Lokeren (Belgium)	1–2 (1–4 agg.)	(Portugal) Benfica	Lokeren
20:00	van der Gijp 7'	Report	Filipovic 57', 64'	Stadium: Daknamstadion; Attendance: 17,000; Referee: Dušan Krchňák

==== Third round ====
24 November 1982 First leg	FC Zürich (Switzerland)	1–1	(Portugal) Benfica	Zürich
20:00	W. Rufer 79'	Report	Filipovic 87'	Stadium: Letzigrund; Attendance: 19,000; Referee: Siegfried Kirschen

8 December 1982 Second leg	Benfica (Portugal)	4–0 (5–1 agg.)	(Switzerland) FC Zürich	Lisbon
21:00	Filipovic 9'; Diamantino 51'; Nené 60', 86' (pen.)	Report		Stadium: Estádio da Luz; Attendance: 75,000; Referee: Volker Roth

==== Quarter-final ====
2 March 1983 First leg	Roma (Italy)	1–2	(Portugal) Benfica	Rome
15:00	Di Bartolomei 66'	Report	Filipovic 40', 59'	Stadium: Stadio Olimpico; Attendance: 65,342; Referee: Horst Brummeier

16 March 1983 Second leg	Benfica (Portugal)	1–1 (3–2 agg.)	(Italy) Roma	Lisbon
22:00	Filipovic 19'	Report	Falcão 85'; Iorio (red card) 88'	Stadium: Estádio da Luz; Attendance: 69,000; Referee: Károly Palotai

==== Semi-final ====
6 April 1983 First leg	Benfica (Portugal)	0–0	(Romania) Universitatea Craiova	Lisbon
22:00		Report		Stadium: Estádio da Luz; Attendance: 62,500; Referee: Erik Fredriksson

20 April 1983 Second leg	Universitatea Craiova (Romania)	1–1 (1–1a agg.)	(Portugal) Benfica	Craiova
20:00	Balaci 17'	Report	Filipovic 53'	Stadium: Stadionul Central; Attendance: 50,000; Referee: Bob Valentine

==== Final ====
4 May 1983 First leg	Anderlecht (Belgium)	1–0	(Portugal) Benfica	Brussels
20:00	Brylle 30'	Report	José Luís (yellow card) 11' (yellow-red card) 75'	Stadium: Heysel Stadium; Attendance: 52,694; Referee: Bogdan Dochev

18 May 1983 Second leg	Benfica (Portugal)	1–1 (1–2 agg.)	(Belgium) Anderlecht	Lisbon
21:00	Shéu 32'	Report	Lozano 38'	Stadium: Estádio da Luz; Attendance: 80,000; Referee: Charles Corver

=== Friendlies ===
23 July 1982	Benfica	3–0	Amora	Lisbon
	João Alves; Nené			Stadium: Estádio da Luz

26 July 1982	Benfica	4–2	Ferencvárosi	Lisbon
	Shéu 7'; Filipovic 27'; Nené 34', 87'		Nyilasi 29'; Pölöskei 60'	Stadium: Estádio da Luz; Referee: Graça Oliva

1 August 1982	LASA XI	1–8	Benfica	Boston
			Filipovic; Nené; Diamantino; Chalana

6 August 1982 Toronto TM	Benfica	1–0	Aris Thessaloniki	Toronto
	Nené

8 August 1982 Toronto TM	Benfica	4–1	Sporting Cristal	Toronto
	Carlos Manuel; Humberto; Filipovic		Gutiérrez	Referee: Ilídio de Matos

16 August 1982	Benfica	5–0	Vasas	Lisbon
	Filipovic 36'; Humberto 50'; Nené 60', 88'; Chalana 68'			Stadium: Estádio da Luz; Attendance: 40,000; Referee: António Ferreira

1 December 1982	Benfica	2–0	PSV Eindhoven	Lisbon
	Humberto 32'; Filipovic 48'			Stadium: Estádio da Luz; Referee: António Garrido

26 January 1983	Benfica	2–1	Bulgaria XI	Lisbon
	Nené 38', 43'		Spasov 54' (pen.)	Stadium: Estádio da Luz; Referee: Pedro Quaresma

22 March 1983	Benfica	0–1	Goteborg	Lisbon
			Corneliusson 42'	Stadium: Estádio da Luz; Referee: Lopes Martins

== Player statistics ==
The squad for the season consisted of the players listed in the tables below, as well as staff member Sven-Goran Eriksson (manager), Toni (assistant manager), Júlio Borges (Director of Football), Amilcar Miranda (Doctor).

Note 1: Note: Flags indicate national team as defined under FIFA eligibility rules. Players may hold more than one non-FIFA nationality.

Note 2: Players with squad numbers marked ‡ joined the club during the 1982-83 season via transfer, with more details in the following section.

No.	Pos	Nat	Player	Total		Primeira Divisão		Taça de Portugal		UEFA Cup	
No.	Pos	Nat	Player	Apps	Goals	Apps	Goals	Apps	Goals	Apps	Goals
1	GK	(Portugal) POR	Manuel Bento	46	0	27	0	7	0	12	0
2	DF	(Portugal) POR	Minervino Pietra	44	2	26	0	6	1	12	1
2	DF	(Portugal) POR	António Veloso	28	3	17	2	4	1	7	0
3	DF	(Portugal) POR	António Oliveira	1	0	0	0	1	0	0	0
3	DF	(Portugal) POR	Humberto Coelho	47	10	29	6	6	4	12	0
3	DF	(Portugal) POR	Álvaro Magalhães	24	1	15	0	3	1	6	0
4	DF	(Portugal) POR	Frederico Rosa	10	0	7	0	1	0	2	0
4	DF	(Portugal) POR	Alberto Bastos Lopes	16	1	10	1	2	0	4	0
5	DF	(Portugal) POR	Carlos Pereira	7	0	5	0	2	0	0	0
5	DF	(Portugal) POR	António Bastos Lopes	47	0	29	0	7	0	11	0
6	MF	(Portugal) POR	José Luís	18	1	9	1	4	0	5	0
6	MF	(Portugal) POR	João Alves	41	2	27	0	5	2	9	0
6	MF	(Portugal) POR	Carlos Manuel	47	9	29	5	7	3	11	1
7	FW	(Portugal) POR	Nené	45	32	28	22	6	5	11	5
8^{‡}	MF	(Sweden) SWE	Glenn Strömberg	8	0	4	0	2	0	2	0
9	FW	(Socialist Federal Republic of Yugoslavia) YUG	Zoran Filipovic	43	27	26	14	5	5	12	8
9	FW	(Portugal) POR	Paulo Padinha	6	1	4	0	1	0	1	1
9	FW	(Brazil) BRA	César Oliveira	10	0	3	0	2	0	5	0
10	MF	(Portugal) POR	Fernando Chalana	46	5	29	3	6	2	11	0
11^{‡}	MF	(Portugal) POR	Diamantino Miranda	47	14	29	9	6	4	12	1
11	MF	(Portugal) POR	Shéu Han	39	3	23	2	6	0	10	1
12^{‡}	GK	(Portugal) POR	Delgado	4	0	3	0	1	0	0	0

== Transfers ==
=== In ===
Entry date	Position	Player	From club	Fee	Ref
5 June 1982	GK	Delgado	Portimonense	Undisclosed	
15 July 1982	MF	Diamantino Miranda	Boavista	Loan return	
10 January 1983	MF	Glenn Strömberg	Göteborg	Undisclosed	

=== Out ===
Exit date	Position	Player	To club	Fee	Ref
25 June 1982	FW	Reinaldo Gomes	Boavista	Free	
29 June 1982	DF	Alberto Fonseca	Boavista	Free	
15 July 1982	GK	António Botelho	Amora	Free	
17 July 1982	FW	Joel Almeida	Farense	Free	
15 July 1982	FW	Francisco Vital	Farense	Free	
17 July 1982	GK	Jorge Martins	Farense	Free	
17 July 1982	DF	João Laranjeira	Amora	Free	
29 July 1982	MF	Cavungi	Alcobaça	Free	
30 July 1982	MF	Paulo Campos	Farense	Free	
4 August 1982	FW	Jorge Gomes	Braga	Undisclosed	
26 January 1983	FW	César Oliveira	Grêmio	Undisclosed	

=== Out by loan ===
Exit date	Position	Player	To club	Return date	Ref
25 August 1982	FW	Fernando Folha	Varzim	30 June 1983	
