= 1984–85 Primeira Divisão =

51st season of top-tier Portuguese football

Primeira Liga
- Season: 1984-85
- Champions: F.C. Porto; 8th title
- Relegated: Rio Ave; Farense; Varzim; Vizela
- European Cup: F.C. Porto
- Cup Winners' Cup: Benfica
- UEFA Cup: Sporting CP (first round); Boavista (first round); Portimonense (first round)
- Matches: 240
- Goals: 669 (2.79 per match)
- Top goalscorer: Fernando Gomes (39 goals)

Statistics of Portuguese Liga in the 1984–85 season.

== Overview ==
It was contested by 16 teams, and F.C. Porto won the championship.

== League standings ==
| Pos | Team | Pld | W | D | L | GF | GA | GD | Pts | Qualification or relegation |
|---|---|---|---|---|---|---|---|---|---|---|
| 1 | Porto (C) | 30 | 26 | 3 | 1 | 78 | 13 | +65 | 55 | Qualification to European Cup first round |
| 2 | Sporting CP | 30 | 19 | 9 | 2 | 72 | 26 | +46 | 47 | Qualification to UEFA Cup first round |
| 3 | Benfica | 30 | 18 | 7 | 5 | 65 | 28 | +37 | 43 | Qualification to Cup Winners' Cup first round (Note: Benfica qualified for the Cup Winners' Cup as Portuguese Cup winners) |
| 4 | Boavista | 30 | 13 | 11 | 6 | 37 | 26 | +11 | 37 | Qualification to UEFA Cup first round |
| 5 | Portimonense | 30 | 14 | 8 | 8 | 51 | 41 | +10 | 36 | Qualification to UEFA Cup first round |
| 6 | Belenenses | 30 | 11 | 8 | 11 | 40 | 46 | −6 | 30 | |
| 7 | Académica | 30 | 12 | 5 | 13 | 45 | 47 | −2 | 29 | |
| 8 | Braga | 30 | 9 | 10 | 11 | 46 | 43 | +3 | 28 | |
| 9 | Vitória de Guimarães | 30 | 9 | 7 | 14 | 33 | 39 | −6 | 25 | |
| 10 | Penafiel | 30 | 7 | 11 | 12 | 25 | 42 | −17 | 25 | |
| 11 | Vitória de Setúbal | 30 | 7 | 11 | 12 | 35 | 50 | −15 | 25 | |
| 12 | Salgueiros | 30 | 8 | 7 | 15 | 40 | 56 | −16 | 23 | |
| 13 | Rio Ave (R) | 30 | 7 | 9 | 14 | 27 | 43 | −16 | 23 | Relegation to Segunda Divisão |
| 14 | Farense (R) | 30 | 7 | 8 | 15 | 21 | 49 | −28 | 22 | Relegation to Segunda Divisão |
| 15 | Varzim (R) | 30 | 2 | 13 | 15 | 23 | 49 | −26 | 17 | Relegation to Segunda Divisão |
| 16 | Vizela (R) | 30 | 4 | 7 | 19 | 31 | 71 | −40 | 15 | Relegation to Segunda Divisão |

Source: RSSSF
(C) Champions; (R) Relegated

== Results ==
| Home \ Away | ACA | BEL | BEN | BOA | BRA | FAR | PEN | PTM | POR | RAV | SAL | SCP | VAR | VGU | VSE | VIZ |
|---|---|---|---|---|---|---|---|---|---|---|---|---|---|---|---|---|
| Académica | | 0–0 | 1–2 | 1–1 | 2–1 | 2–0 | 5–0 | 1–0 | 0–3 | 2–1 | 2–0 | 2–3 | 0–0 | 3–1 | 0–0 | 1–3 |
| Belenenses | 4–1 | | 0–3 | 2–2 | 1–1 | 2–1 | 2–1 | 2–0 | 0–1 | 1–1 | 4–3 | 0–3 | 3–1 | 2–1 | 2–2 | 2–0 |
| Benfica | 3–2 | 4–1 | | 0–0 | 2–0 | 6–0 | 2–1 | 5–1 | 0–1 | 2–0 | 3–0 | 3–1 | 5–1 | 0–0 | 4–3 | 5–1 |
| Boavista | 2–0 | 1–0 | 0–0 | | 2–1 | 3–0 | 1–0 | 2–1 | 1–0 | 2–3 | 0–0 | 0–0 | 1–0 | 0–0 | 0–2 | 2–2 |
| Braga | 2–0 | 2–0 | 2–2 | 2–2 | | 3–1 | 1–1 | 1–1 | 2–3 | 1–1 | 4–0 | 1–1 | 4–1 | 1–1 | 3–0 | 4–2 |
| Farense | 0–2 | 1–0 | 1–0 | 0–1 | 0–0 | | 1–0 | 0–0 | 1–2 | 2–1 | 1–1 | 1–1 | 1–1 | 3–1 | 3–1 | 1–0 |
| Penafiel | 0–3 | 0–0 | 1–0 | 1–1 | 1–0 | 0–0 | | 1–1 | 0–1 | 2–0 | 4–3 | 2–0 | 2–1 | 1–0 | 1–1 | 1–1 |
| Portimonense | 2–1 | 2–1 | 0–0 | 2–1 | 2–1 | 3–1 | 4–0 | | 1–3 | 3–1 | 4–3 | 0–0 | 4–0 | 0–0 | 4–2 | 4–1 |
| Porto | 4–1 | 5–1 | 2–0 | 3–0 | 2–1 | 5–0 | 3–0 | 4–1 | | 3–0 | 2–0 | 0–0 | 5–1 | 2–1 | 4–0 | 9–1 |
| Rio Ave | 1–0 | 1–0 | 2–2 | 0–3 | 3–2 | 2–1 | 0–0 | 1–2 | 0–3 | | 0–0 | 1–1 | 1–0 | 0–0 | 0–0 | 2–0 |
| Salgueiros | 0–1 | 1–2 | 2–3 | 0–2 | 1–1 | 3–1 | 2–1 | 1–0 | 0–1 | 2–0 | | 2–6 | 2–2 | 2–1 | 1–0 | 4–1 |
| Sporting CP | 4–4 | 2–0 | 1–0 | 2–1 | 8–1 | 2–0 | 1–1 | 3–2 | 0–0 | 3–2 | 4–1 | | 3–0 | 3–0 | 4–0 | 4–0 |
| Varzim | 2–4 | 1–2 | 0–1 | 1–1 | 1–0 | 0–0 | 4–0 | 1–1 | 1–2 | 1–1 | 0–0 | 0–2 | | 0–0 | 1–1 | 1–1 |
| Vitória de Guimarães | 2–1 | 2–2 | 1–4 | 1–2 | 0–1 | 4–0 | 1–0 | 0–1 | 0–2 | 3–2 | 4–3 | 0–1 | 1–0 | | 3–1 | 3–0 |
| Vitória de Setúbal | 5–1 | 2–2 | 2–2 | 2–1 | 0–2 | 3–0 | 1–1 | 2–2 | 0–3 | 1–0 | 0–0 | 0–4 | 0–0 | 1–0 | | 2–0 |
| Vizela | 1–2 | 1–2 | 1–2 | 0–2 | 2–1 | 0–0 | 2–2 | 2–3 | 0–0 | 1–0 | 2–3 | 2–5 | 1–1 | 1–2 | 2–1 | |

Legend: Blue = home team win; Yellow = draw; Red = away team win.

== Season statistics ==
=== Top goalscorers ===
| Rank | Player | Club | Goals |
|---|---|---|---|
| 1 | (Portugal) Fernando Gomes | Porto | 39 |
| 2 | (Denmark) Michael Manniche | Benfica | 16 |
| 2 | (Belgium) Serge Cadorin | Portimonense | 16 |
| 2 | (Portugal) Manuel Fernandes | Sporting | 16 |
| 5 | (Portugal) Djão | Belenenses | 13 |
| 5 | (Brazil) Tonanha | Salgueiros | 13 |
| 5 | (Portugal) Pedro Xavier | Académica de Coimbra | 13 |
| 5 | (Brazil) Zinho | Braga | 13 |
| 9 | (Brazil) Eldon | Portugal | 11 |
| 9 | (Portugal) Jaime Magalhães | Porto | 11 |
| 9 | (Portugal) José Ribeiro | Académica de Coimbra | 11 |

== Attendances ==
| # | Club | Average |
|---|---|---|
| 1 | Porto | 45,000 |
| 2 | Sporting | 37,133 |
| 3 | Benfica | 32,000 |
| 4 | Vitória SC | 14,133 |
| 5 | Braga | 13,867 |
| 6 | Boavista | 13,767 |
| 7 | Os Belenenses | 12,800 |
| 8 | Varzim | 12,200 |
| 9 | Vitória FC | 10,667 |
| 10 | Académica | 10,667 |
| 11 | Farense | 9,733 |
| 12 | Rio Ave | 9,733 |
| 13 | Portimonense | 9,133 |
| 14 | Salgueiros | 8,833 |
| 15 | Penafiel | 7,933 |
| 16 | Vizela | 6,333 |
