= 1985 Taça de Portugal final =

- Event: 1984–85 Taça de Portugal
Benfica	Porto
3	1
- Date: 10 June 1985
- Venue: Estádio Nacional, Oeiras
- Referee: Raúl Nazaré (Setúbal)

The 1985 Taça de Portugal final was the final match of the 1984–85 Taça de Portugal, the 45th season of the Taça de Portugal, the premier Portuguese football cup competition organized by the Portuguese Football Federation (FPF). The match was played on 10 June 1985 at the Estádio Nacional in Oeiras, and opposed two Primeira Liga sides: Benfica and Porto. Benfica defeated Porto 3–1 to claim the Taça de Portugal for a nineteenth time.

In Portugal, the final was televised live on RTP. As a result of Benfica winning the Taça de Portugal, the Águias qualified for the 1985 Supertaça Cândido de Oliveira where they took on their cup opponents and 1984–85 Primeira Divisão winners Porto.

== Match ==
=== Details ===
10 June 1985

Benfica	3–1	Porto
Nunes 14'; Manniche 33', 47' (pen.)		Futre 67' (pen.)

Estádio Nacional, Oeiras
Referee: Raúl Nazaré (Setúbal)

Benfica	Porto

GK	1	(Portugal) Manuel Bento (c)	(yellow card) 70'
RB	2	(Portugal) Minervino Pietra
CB	3	(Portugal) António Bastos Lopes
CB	5	(Portugal) António Oliveira
LB	4	(Portugal) Álvaro Magalhães
MF	7	(Portugal) Shéu
MF	6	(Portugal) Carlos Manuel		(substituted off) 73'
MF	10	(Portugal) Adelino Nunes
MF	9	(Portugal) José Luís
MF	11	(Portugal) Diamantino Miranda		(substituted off) 73'
FW	8	(Denmark) Michael Manniche
Substitutes:
FW	14	(Portugal) Nené		(substituted on) 73'
FW	16	(Brazil) Wando		(substituted on) 73'
Manager:
(Hungary) Pál Csernai

GK	1	(Portugal) Zé Beto
RB	2	(Portugal) João Pinto
CB		(Portugal) Eurico Gomes
CB	4	(Portugal) António Lima Pereira		(substituted off) 35'
LB	3	(Portugal) Augusto Inácio
MF	7	(Portugal) António Frasco	(yellow card) 83'
MF		(Portugal) Quim	(yellow card) 89'
MF	10	(Portugal) Paulo Futre
MF		(Portugal) Jaime Magalhães
MF		(Portugal) Vermelhinho
FW	9	(Portugal) Fernando Gomes (c)		(substituted off) 35'
Substitutes:
MF	16	(Portugal) José Semedo		(substituted on) 35'
MF		(Portugal) Mito		(substituted on) 35'
Manager:
(Portugal) Artur Jorge

1984–85 Taça de Portugal Winners
Benfica
19th Title

Match officials

- Assistant referees:
- Fourth official:

Match rules

- 90 minutes.
- 30 minutes of extra time if necessary.
- Maximum of two substitutions

== See also ==
- O Clássico
- 1984–85 S.L. Benfica season
