= 1982–83 Taça de Portugal =

Tournament details
- Country: Portugal
- Dates: September 1982 – 21 August 1983

Final positions
- Champions: Benfica (5th title)
- Runners-up: Porto

Tournament statistics
- Top goal scorer(s): Fernando Gomes (13 goals)

The 1982–83 Taça de Portugal was the 43rd edition of the Taça de Portugal, a Portuguese football knockout tournament organized by the Portuguese Football Federation (FPF). The 1982–83 Taça de Portugal began in September 1982. The final was played on 21 August 1983 at the Estádio das Antas.

Sporting CP were the previous holders, having defeated Braga 4–0 in the previous season's final. Cup holders Sporting CP were eliminated in the quarter-finals by Benfica. Benfica defeated Porto, 1–0 in the final to win their eighteenth Taça de Portugal. As a result of Benfica winning both league and cup in the same season, cup runners-up Porto would face the cup holders in the 1983 Supertaça Cândido de Oliveira.

== Fifth round ==
Ties were played on the 20 February.

20 February 1983	Académica de Coimbra (II)	4–1	Esperança de Lagos (III)	Estádio Cidade de Coimbra, Coimbra
		(Report)

20 February 1983	Farense (II)	0–1	Sporting CP (I)	Estádio de São Luís, Faro
		(Report)	A. Oliveira

20 February 1983	Leixões (II)	1–2	Benfica (I)	Estádio do Mar, Matosinhos
		(Report)	Coelho 33'; Filipović 60'

20 February 1983	Naval (III)	0–5	Braga (I)	Estádio Municipal José Bento Pessoa, Figueira da Foz
		(Report)

20 February 1983	Portimonense (I)	3–1	Gil Vicente (II)	Estádio Municipal de Portimão, Portimão
		(Report)

20 February 1983	Porto (I)	3–1	Sporting de Espinho (I)	Estádio das Antas, Porto
	F. Gomes 21' (pen.); E. Gomes 59'; Walsh 72'	(Report)	Carvalho 72'

20 February 1983	Silves (III)	0–1	Boavista (I)	Estádio Doutor Francisco Vieira, Silves
		(Report)

20 February 1983	Valdevez (II)	1–0	Cinfães (IV)	Estádio Municipal da Coutada, Arcos de Valdevez
		(Report)

== Quarter-finals ==
Ties were played on the 2 April.

2 April 1983	Académica de Coimbra (II)	2–1	Valdevez (II)	Estádio Cidade de Coimbra, Coimbra
		(Report)

2 April 1983	Benfica (I)	3–0	Sporting CP (I)	Estádio da Luz, Lisbon
	Chalana 28'; Diamantino 30'; Carlos Manuel 70'	(Report)

2 April 1983	Portimonense (I)	1–0	Boavista (I)	Estádio Municipal de Portimão, Portimão
		(Report)

2 April 1983	Porto (I)	3–0	Braga (I)	Estádio das Antas, Porto
	Gomes 9', 83' (pen.); Lima Pereira 80'	(Report)

== Semi-finals ==
Ties were played on the 8 May.

8 May 1983	Benfica (I)	2–0	Portimonense (I)	Estádio da Luz, Lisbon
	Nené 17', 38'	(Report)		Referee: Fernando Alberto

8 May 1983	Porto (I)	9–1	Académica de Coimbra (II)	Estádio das Antas, Porto
	Gomes 8', 14', 27', 88'; Alberto Costa 18'; Frasco 42'; Jacques 55', 83'; João Pinto 90'	(Report)	Luís Horta 60'

== Final ==
21 August 1983

Porto	0–1	Benfica
		Carlos Manuel 20'

Estádio das Antas, Porto
Referee: Mário Luís (Santarém)
