= Vítor Duarte =

Portuguese footballer of Mozambican descent

Personal information
- Full name: Vítor Silva Duarte
- Date of birth: 31 August 1959 (age 67)
- Place of birth: Maputo, Portuguese Mozambique
- Position: Defender

Youth career
- União Santarém

Senior career*
| Years | Team | Apps | (Gls) |
| 1978–1979 | Académica de Coimbra | 0 | (0) |
| 1979–1980 | Marialvas | | |
| 1980–1981 | Águeda | | |
| 1981–1985 | União de Coimbra | 120 | (3) |
| 1985–1986 | Benfica | 1 | (0) |
| 1986–1987 | Farense | 16 | (1) |
| 1987–1991 | Braga | 137 | (8) |
| 1991–1993 | Beira-Mar | 47 | (2) |
| 1993–1994 | Académica de Coimbra | 19 | (0) |
| 1994–1996 | União de Coimbra | 52 | (2) |
| 1996–1997 | Lousanense | | |
- * Club domestic league appearances and goals

Vítor Silva Duarte (born 31 August 1959) is a Mozambique-born former Portuguese footballer who played as a defender. He played eight seasons and 200 games in the Primeira Liga, mostly with Braga and also with Beira-Mar, Farense and Benfica.

== Career ==
Duarte made his professional debut in the Primeira Liga for Benfica on 1 December 1985 as a late substitute in a 1–0 victory over Académica de Coimbra.
