= Serge Cadorin =

Belgian footballer (1961–2007)

Personal information
- Full name: Serge Henry Helene Cadorin
- Date of birth: 7 September 1961
- Place of birth: Stavelot, Belgium
- Date of death: 10 April 2007 (aged 45)
- Place of death: Jupille-sur-Meuse, Belgium
- Height: 1.84 m (6 ft 0 in)
- Position: Forward

Senior career*
Years	Team	Apps	(Gls)
1981–1983	R.F.C. de Liège	14	(1)
1983–1987	Portimonense	65	(33)
1987–1988	Académica de Coimbra	17	(3)
1988–1989	Portimonense	8	(1)
1989–1990	Tongeren	5	(0)
- * Club domestic league appearances and goals

Serge Cadorin (7 September 1961 – 10 April 2007) was a Belgian professional footballer who played as a forward.

Cadorin began his professional career with R.F.C. de Liège in 1981, and he played for the club until 1983. Next, he moved to Portugal where he would play for several years before returning to Belgium. He played for Portimonense in the Portuguese Liga from 1983 to 1989, with one season at Académica de Coimbra in between.

His father, Bruno Cadorin, was also a professional football player.
