= Pedro Xavier =

Portuguese footballer (born 1962)

Personal information
- Full name: Pedro Alexandre Marques Caldas Xavier
- Date of birth: 26 January 1962 (age 64)
- Place of birth: Lourenço Marques, Mozambique
- Height: 1.80 m (5 ft 11 in)
- Position: Forward

Youth career
- 1976–1979: Casa Pia
- 1979–1980: Sporting CP

Senior career*
Years	Team	Apps	(Gls)
1980–1984	Estoril	67	(9)
1984–1988	Académica	108	(28)
1988–1992	Estrela Amadora	73	(17)
1992–1993	Campomaiorense	17	(2)
1993–1994	Barreirense	32	(5)
1994–1995	Olivais Moscavide	17	(8)
1995–1998	South China		
Total		314	(69)

International career
1982–1986	Portugal U21	7	(1)
1985–1989	Portugal	4	(0)
- * Club domestic league appearances and goals

Pedro Alexandre Marques Caldas Xavier (born 26 January 1962) is a Portuguese retired footballer who played as a forward.

== Club career ==
Xavier was born in Lourenço Marques, Portuguese Mozambique. An unsuccessful Sporting CP youth graduate, he went on to represent in his country G.D. Estoril Praia, Académica de Coimbra, C.F. Estrela da Amadora, S.C. Campomaiorense, F.C. Barreirense and C.D. Olivais e Moscavide. He spent ten seasons in the Primeira Liga, amassing totals of 224 matches and 48 goals.

Aged 33, Xavier moved abroad, playing three years in Hong Kong for South China AA before retiring from professional football.

== International career ==
After the 1986 FIFA World Cup – almost the entire squad renounced the national team due to the Saltillo Affair – Xavier won the better part of his four caps for Portugal.

== Personal life ==
Xavier's twin brother, Carlos, was also a professional footballer. A midfielder, he played several seasons with Sporting's first team.
