= Estádio Municipal 25 de Abril =

Stadium in Penafiel, Portugal

Coordinates: 41°12′42.12″N 8°16′40.51″W

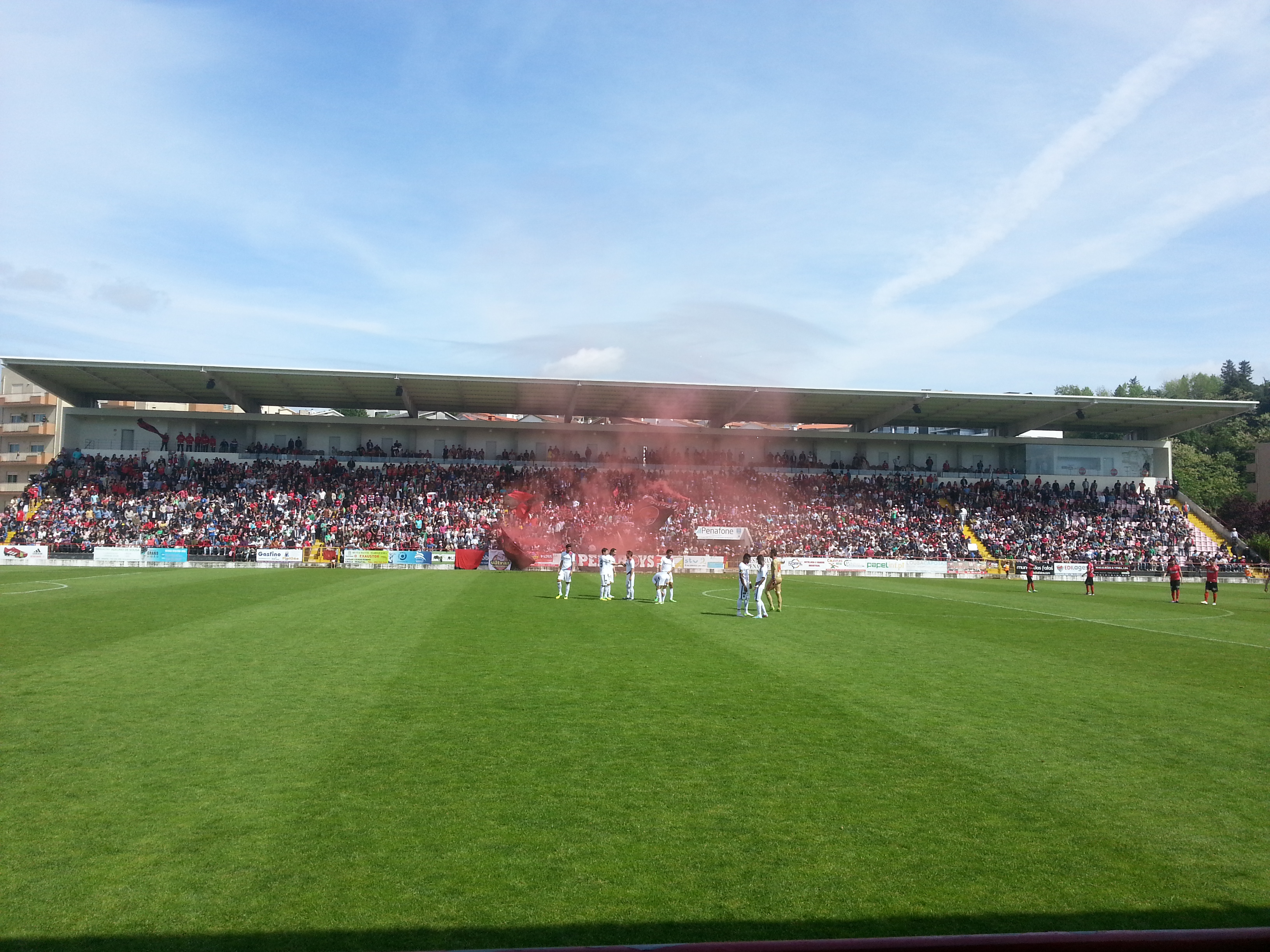
- Interactive map of Estádio Municipal 25 de Abril
- Full name: Estádio Municipal 25 de Abril
- Location: Penafiel, Portugal
- Owner: F.C. Penafiel
- Capacity: 5,230
- Surface: Grass
- Field size: 105 x 67 metres

Construction
- Built: 1930 - 1934
- Opened: 21 January 1934
- Renovated: 2000

Tenant
- F.C. Penafiel

Estadio Municipal 25 de Abril is a multi-use stadium in Penafiel, Portugal. It is primarily used for football matches and is the home ground of F.C. Penafiel.

The ground currently holds a capacity of 5,230. The stadium was built between 1930 and 1934 and was opened on 21 January 1934. The first game it hosted was between Penafiel and Penafidelense. The stadium was previously called Campo das Leiras but was changed in 1974 following the Carnation Revolution. The stadium was remodeled in 2000.
