= Zinho (footballer, born 1962) =

Brazilian football coach and former player

Personal information
- Full name: Celso Santiago de Souza
- Date of birth: 5 July 1962 (age 64)
- Place of birth: Rio de Janeiro, Brazil
- Height: 1.68 m (5 ft 6 in)
- Position: Midfielder

Senior career*
Years	Team	Apps	(Gls)
1982–1983	Vasco da Gama		
1983–1986	Braga	91	(25)
1986–1987	Sporting CP	22	(2)
1987–1988	Braga	21	(2)
1988–1989	Penafiel	12	(0)
1989–1990	Racing de Santander		
1990–1994	Espinho		

Managerial career
- 1996–1997: Sporting Espinho
- * Club domestic league appearances and goals

Celso Santiago de Souza, known as Zinho (born 5 July 1962), is a Brazilian football coach and a former player.

A midfielder, he played eight seasons and 178 games in the Primeira Liga for Braga, Sporting CP, Espinho and Penafiel.

== Career ==
Zinho made his Primeira Liga debut for Braga on 17 April 1983 as a late substitute in a 3–1 loss to Boavista.

He scored three goals for Sporting CP in their first-round 1986–87 UEFA Cup matchup against ÍA.
