= José Ribeiro =

Portuguese footballer

Personal information
- Full name: José Joaquim Pimentel Ribeiro
- Date of birth: 2 November 1957 (age 68)
- Place of birth: Vila Nova da Barquinha, Portugal
- Position: Winger

Youth career
- 1972–1973: Botafogo Cabanas
- 1973–1975: Vitória Setúbal

Senior career*
Years	Team	Apps	(Gls)
1976–1977	Águas de Moura	8	(0)
1977–1978	Vitória Setúbal	1	(0)
1978–1979	União Tomar		
1979–1980	União Coimbra	23	(9)
1980–1982	Vitória Guimarães	27	(0)
1982–1983	Amora	27	(3)
1983–1985	Académica	62	(19)
1985–1987	Boavista	37	(6)
1987–1989	Farense	25	(0)
1989–1990	Olhanense	12	(0)
1990–1991	Alcacerense		
1992–1994	Praiense		
Total		222	(37)

International career
1985	Portugal U21	1	(0)
1985	Portugal	2	(0)
- * Club domestic league appearances and goals

José Joaquim Pimentel Ribeiro (born 2 November 1957) is a Portuguese retired footballer who played as a left winger.

== Club career ==
Ribeiro was born in Vila Nova da Barquinha, Santarém District. During his professional career, he represented Vitória de Setúbal, U.F.C.I. Tomar, C.F. União de Coimbra, Vitória de Guimarães, Amora FC, Académica de Coimbra, Boavista FC, S.C. Farense and S.C. Olhanense, retiring in 1990 at the age of 32 but continuing to play at amateur level.

Nine of Ribeiro's 18 senior seasons were spent in the Primeira Liga, where he totalled 146 games and 20 goals.

== International career ==
Ribeiro earned two caps for the Portugal national team, all in 1985, and was selected to the following year's FIFA World Cup.
