= Jorge Silva (footballer, born 1959) =

Portuguese footballer

Personal information
- Full name: Jorge Manuel Lopes da Silva
- Date of birth: 23 June 1959 (age 67)
- Place of birth: Lisbon, Portugal
- Height: 1.73 m (5 ft 8 in)
- Position: Striker

Youth career
- 1972–1974: Lourenço Marques
- 1974–1978: Benfica

Senior career*
Years	Team	Apps	(Gls)
1978–1980	Benfica	7	(4)
1980–1981	Amora	28	(14)
1981–1984	Boavista	74	(23)
1984–1985	Benfica	26	(8)
1985–1987	Chaves	51	(16)
1987–1989	Marítimo	73	(25)
1989–1990	Belenenses	20	(2)
1990–1992	Vitória Setúbal	29	(10)
1992–1994	Ovarense	19	(7)
1994–1998	Lusitano		
Total		327	(109)

International career
1989	Portugal	1	(0)
- * Club domestic league appearances and goals

Jorge Manuel Lopes da Silva (born 23 June 1959 in Lisbon) is a Portuguese former professional footballer who played as a striker.
