= José Luís (footballer, born 1958) =

Portuguese football manager and former player

Personal information
- Full name: José Luís Lopes Costa e Silva
- Date of birth: 17 May 1958 (age 68)
- Place of birth: Lisbon, Portugal
- Height: 1.75 m (5 ft 9 in)
- Position: Attacking midfielder

Youth career
- 1974–1976: Benfica

Senior career*
| Years | Team | Apps | (Gls) |
| 1976–1987 | Benfica | 161 | (19) |
| 1987–1991 | Marítimo | 122 | (9) |
| 1991–1993 | Ovarense | 20 | (0) |
| Total | | 303 | (28) |

International career
| 1983–1985 | Portugal | 4 | (1) |

Managerial career
- 1993–1994: Ovarense (assistant)
- 1998–1999: Esposende
- 1999–2000: Operário
- 2004–2005: Timor-Leste
- 2005: Sabah
- 2005–2006: Marítimo B
- 2007: Lousada
- 2007–2008: South China
- 2009–2010: Dong Tam Long An
- 2010: Quang Nam
- 2015–2016: Kenkre
- * Club domestic league appearances and goals

José Luís Lopes Costa e Silva (born 17 May 1958), known as José Luís, is a Portuguese former footballer who played as an attacking midfielder.

== Club career ==
Born in Lisbon, José Luís was promoted to hometown's S.L. Benfica's first team at only 18, finishing his first season with 25 matches, 20 starts and two goals as the club won the Primeira Liga championship. Until the end of his tenure he was irregularly used, his best years being 1983 to 1985 as he appeared in 57 games combined – six goals – and won the 1984 league and the following year's Portuguese Cup; he also played the full 90 minutes in the 1982–83 UEFA Cup final's first hand, a 0–1 away loss against R.S.C. Anderlecht (1–2 on aggregate).

José Luís left Benfica in summer 1987 and signed for C.S. Marítimo, competing in a further four top division campaigns and eventually amassing totals in the competition of 283 matches and 28 goals. He retired in June 1993 at the age of 35, after two years with A.D. Ovarense in the second level.

Subsequently, José Luís worked as a manager in Malaysia, Hong Kong and Vietnam, also coaching teams in his country's third division (including his former club Marítimo's reserves).

== International career ==
José Luís played four times for Portugal during two years, his debut being on 21 September 1983 against Finland for the UEFA Euro 1984 qualifiers, scoring the fourth goal in a 5–0 home win. He was not, however, picked for the final stages in France, with the nation finishing third.

José Luís was appointed at newly created East Timor national team in late 2004, coaching the country in its first-ever international competition, the 2004 Tiger Cup.

José Luís: International goals
| No. | Date | Venue | Opponent | Score | Result | Competition |
|---|---|---|---|---|---|---|
| 1 | 21 September 1983 | Estádio José Alvalade (1956), Lisbon, Portugal | Finland | 4–0 | 5–0 | Euro 1984 qualifying |

== Managerial career ==
In March 2013, ahead of the I-League Second Division kickoff, he joined Kenkre as head coach. The club then brought three of their first foreigners, Portuguese Rodilson Felisberto Fernandes Dias, Domingo De Jesus Gomes, Bruno Daniel Alciaes, and Australian Daniel Atkins.

== Personal life ==
José Luís' younger, brother, Jorge, was also a footballer. A striker, they shared teams in all the clubs the former represented.

== Honours ==
Benfica

- Primeira Liga: 1976–77, 1980–81, 1982–83, 1983–84, 1986–87
- Taça de Portugal: 1979–80, 1980–81, 1982–83, 1984–85, 1985–86, 1986–87
- Supertaça Cândido de Oliveira: 1980, 1985
- UEFA Cup: Runner-up 1982–83
