= Carlos Manuel =

Portuguese football manager and former player (born 1958)

Personal information
- Full name: Carlos Manuel Correia dos Santos
- Date of birth: 15 January 1958 (age 68)
- Place of birth: Moita, Portugal
- Height: 1.76 m (5 ft 9 in)
- Position: Midfielder

Youth career
- CUF

Senior career*
Years	Team	Apps	(Gls)
1975–1978	CUF	2	(0)
1978–1979	Barreirense	30	(3)
1979–1987	Benfica	213	(40)
1988	Sion	16	(10)
1988–1990	Sporting CP	48	(4)
1990–1992	Boavista	17	(0)
1992–1994	Estoril	45	(3)
Total		371	(60)

International career
1980–1986	Portugal	42	(8)

Managerial career
- 1993–1996: Estoril
- 1996–1998: Salgueiros
- 1998: Sporting CP
- 1998: Braga
- 1999–2000: Campomaiorense
- 2000–2001: Santa Clara
- 2001–2002: Salgueiros
- 2002: Santa Clara
- 2002–2003: Salgueiros
- 2004–2005: Olivais Moscavide
- 2007–2009: Atlético
- 2009–2011: Oriental
- 2011–2012: 1º Agosto
- 2012: Guinea-Bissau
- 2014–2015: Sanat Naft
Medal record
Men's football
Representing Portugal
UEFA European Championship
Bronze medal – third place	1984 France
- * Club domestic league appearances and goals

Carlos Manuel Correia dos Santos (pronounced [ˈkaɾluʒ mɐnuˈɛl]; born 15 January 1958), known as Carlos Manuel, is a Portuguese retired professional footballer who played as a central midfielder, and a manager.

Best known for his spell at Benfica, for which he appeared in 318 competitive matches over eight and a half seasons, scoring 58 goals. He was also a leading figure for the national team during the better part of the 1980s and, after retiring, he embarked on a lengthy spell as coach.

Having won more than 40 caps for Portugal in six years, Carlos Manuel represented the nation in one World Cup and one European Championship.

== Club career ==
Born in Moita, Setúbal District, Carlos Manuel made his senior debut with G.D. CUF, moving in 1978 to F.C. Barreirense. He reached the Primeira Liga as he signed with S.L. Benfica, still in Lisbon, going on to be an influential member of a side that won four leagues and six cups in the 80s, as well as finishing runners-up to R.S.C. Anderlecht in the 1982–83 UEFA Cup.

After falling out of favour with the club's management, Carlos Manuel moved in January 1988 to Switzerland with FC Sion. Only five months later, he returned to the Portuguese capital after signing with Sporting CP. After a solid first season his career began winding down, and he finally retired at the end of 1993–94 whilst at G.D. Estoril Praia – he had previously represented Boavista F.C. for two years; he was chosen by Portuguese sports newspaper Record as one of the best 100 Portuguese football players ever.

After retiring at 36, Carlos Manuel took up coaching, having managed with little success a host of clubs, mainly in the Lisbon area. Midway through the 1997–98 campaign, he bought out his contract at S.C. Salgueiros and joined Sporting, but the latter could only finish fourth and he was dismissed, a fate he met mere months after at S.C. Braga.

== International career ==
For the Portugal national team, Carlos Manuel was capped on 42 occasions, scoring eight goals. His debut came on 26 March 1980 in a 1–4 away loss against Scotland for the UEFA Euro 1980 qualifiers.

Three of those goals were memorable: the win over Poland in Wrocław on 28 October 1983 which helped Portugal qualify for Euro 1984, the historic victory in West Germany on 16 October 1985, which secured qualification for the 1986 FIFA World Cup, and in the latter competition's final stages, the defeat of England in the group opener (all three matches finished 1–0 for Portugal).

After the 1986 World Cup loss to Morocco, with the national side being ousted in the group stages – the competition was also stained by the Portuguese players' involvement in the Saltillo Affair – Carlos Manuel retired from the international scene, at only 28. In June 2012, he succeeded Luís Norton de Matos as manager of Guinea-Bissau. He was in charge for one match, a 1–0 loss away to Cameroon in the 2013 Africa Cup of Nations qualifying stage (2–0 aggregate).

Carlos Manuel: International goals
No.	Date	Venue	Opponent	Score	Result	Competition
1	7 October 1980	Estádio do Restelo, Lisbon, Portugal	United States	1–0	1–1	Friendly
2	21 September 1983	Estádio José Alvalade (1956), Lisbon, Portugal	Finland	2–0	5–0	Euro 1984 qualifying
3	28 October 1983	Olympic Stadium (Wrocław), Wroclaw, Poland	Poland	0–1	0–1	Euro 1984 qualifying
4	14 October 1984	Estádio das Antas, Porto, Portugal	Czechoslovakia	2–1	2–1	1986 World Cup qualification
5	30 January 1985	Estádio José Alvalade (1956), Lisbon, Portugal	Romania	2–0	2–3	Friendly
6	10 February 1985	Ta' Qali National Stadium, Ta' Qali, Malta	Malta	0–1	1–3	1986 World Cup qualification
7	16 October 1985	Neckarstadion, Stuttgart, West Germany	West Germany	0–1	0–1	1986 World Cup qualification
8	3 June 1986	Estadio Tecnológico, Monterrey, Mexico	England	1–0	1–0	1986 FIFA World Cup

== Honours ==
=== Club ===
Benfica

- Primeira Liga: 1980–81, 1982–83, 1983–84, 1986–87
- Taça de Portugal: 1979–80, 1980–81, 1982–83, 1984–85, 1985–86, 1986–87
- Supertaça Cândido de Oliveira: 1979, 1984
- Taça de Honra (2)
- UEFA Cup runner-up: 1982–83

Boavista

- Taça de Portugal: 1991–92

=== Individual ===
- CNID Footballer of the Year: 1985
